= 2011 CONCACAF Gold Cup squads =

International football tournament squads

The 2011 CONCACAF Gold Cup was an international football tournament held in the United States from June 5 to 25, 2011. The twelve national teams involved in the tournament were required to register a squad of 23 players, as stipulated in the CONCACAF Gold Cup Tournament Rules and Regulations; only players listed in these squads were eligible to take part in the tournament. Listed players could only be substituted in the event of a serious injury up until 24 hours before the team's first match. The squads were submitted on May 21, 2011, fifteen days prior to the first match.

== Group A ==
=== Costa Rica ===
Head coach: (Argentina) Ricardo La Volpe

No.	Pos.	Player	Date of birth (age)	Caps	Goals	Club
1	GK	Keylor Navas	December 15, 1986 (aged 24)	23	0	(Royal Spanish Football Federation) Albacete
2	DF	Francisco Calvo	July 8, 1992 (aged 18)	0	0	(United States Soccer Federation) San Jacinto College
3	DF	Jhonny Acosta	July 21, 1983 (aged 27)	1	1	(Costa Rican Football Federation) Alajuelense
4	DF	José Salvatierra	October 10, 1989 (aged 21)	0	0	(Costa Rican Football Federation) Alajuelense
5	MF	Celso Borges (captain)	May 27, 1988 (aged 23)	31	8	(Norwegian Football Federation) Fredrikstad
6	DF	Heiner Mora	June 20, 1984 (aged 26)	9	0	(Costa Rican Football Federation) Saprissa
7	FW	Christian Bolaños	May 17, 1984 (aged 27)	35	1	(Danish Football Association) Copenhagen
8	MF	David Guzmán	February 18, 1990 (aged 21)	7	0	(Costa Rican Football Federation) Saprissa
9	FW	Álvaro Saborío	March 25, 1982 (aged 29)	64	22	(United States Soccer Federation) Real Salt Lake
10	FW	Bryan Ruiz	August 18, 1985 (aged 25)	34	9	(The Football Association) Fulham
11	MF	Diego Madrigal	March 19, 1989 (aged 22)	6	2	(Paraguayan Football Association) Cerro Porteño
12	FW	Joel Campbell	June 26, 1992 (aged 18)	1	0	(Costa Rican Football Federation) Saprissa
14	DF	Bryan Oviedo	February 18, 1990 (aged 21)	6	1	(Danish Football Association) Copenhagen
15	DF	Júnior Díaz	September 12, 1983 (aged 27)	42	1	(Royal Belgian Football Association) Club Brugge
16	FW	Marco Ureña	March 5, 1990 (aged 21)	13	4	(Russian Football Union) Kuban Krasnodar
17	FW	Josué Martínez	March 25, 1990 (aged 21)	10	1	(Costa Rican Football Federation) Saprissa
18	GK	Donny Grant	April 12, 1976 (aged 35)	6	0	(Costa Rican Football Federation) San Carlos
19	DF	Óscar Duarte	June 3, 1989 (aged 22)	2	0	(Costa Rican Football Federation) Saprissa
20	DF	Dennis Marshall	August 9, 1985 (aged 25)	15	0	(Danish Football Association) AaB
21	FW	Randall Brenes	August 13, 1983 (aged 27)	10	3	(Costa Rican Football Federation) Cartaginés
22	MF	José Miguel Cubero	February 14, 1987 (aged 24)	8	0	(Costa Rican Football Federation) Herediano
23	GK	Leonel Moreira	February 4, 1990 (aged 21)	0	0	(Costa Rican Football Federation) Herediano
24	MF	Allen Guevara	April 16, 1989 (aged 22)	4	0	(Costa Rican Football Federation) Alajuelense

=== Cuba ===
Head coach: Raúl González

No.	Pos.	Player	Date of birth (age)	Caps	Club
1	GK	Odelín Molina	August 3, 1974 (aged 36)	76	(Cuba) Villa Clara
2	MF	Carlos Francisco	May 22, 1990 (aged 21)	19	Santiago de Cuba
3	DF	Yénier Márquez	March 1, 1979 (aged 32)	91	(Cuba) Villa Clara
4	DF	Hánier Dranguet	April 27, 1982 (aged 29)	21	(Cuba) Guantánamo
5	DF	Jorge Luís Clavelo	August 8, 1982 (aged 28)	27	(Cuba) Villa Clara
6	MF	Yoel Colomé	October 15, 1982 (aged 28)	24	(Cuba) Ciudad de La Habana
7	MF	Marcel Hernández	April 11, 1989 (aged 22)	11	(Cuba) Ciudad de La Habana
8	MF	Jaime Colomé (captain)	June 30, 1979 (aged 31)	63	(Cuba) Ciudad de La Habana
9	FW	Alain Cervantes	November 17, 1983 (aged 27)	56	(Cuba) Ciego de Ávila
10	FW	Roberto Linares	February 10, 1986 (aged 25)	28	(Cuba) Villa Clara
12	GK	Julio Pichardo	January 10, 1990 (aged 21)	1	(Cuba) Las Tunas
14	DF	Aliannis Urgellés	June 25, 1985 (aged 25)	28	(Cuba) Guantánamo
15	FW	Yaudel Lahera	February 9, 1991 (aged 20)	5	(Cuba) Ciudad de La Habana
16	DF	Reysander Fernández	August 22, 1984 (aged 26)	57	(Cuba) Ciego de Ávila
17	FW	Yosniel Mesa	May 11, 1984 (aged 27)	6	(Cuba) Cienfuegos
18	MF	Dagoberto Quesada	October 6, 1987 (aged 23)	7	(Cuba) Camagüey
19	MF	Francisco Carrazana	December 23, 1985 (aged 25)	1	(Cuba) Cienfuegos
20	MF	Alberto Gómez	February 12, 1988 (aged 23)	5	(Cuba) Guantánamo

Yosniel Mesa defected to the United States.

=== El Salvador ===
Head coach: (Uruguay) Rubén Israel

No.	Pos.	Player	Date of birth (age)	Caps	Club
1	GK	Miguel Montes^{*}	February 12, 1980 (aged 31)	38	(El Salvador) Isidro Metapán
2	DF	Xavier García	June 26, 1990 (aged 20)	8	(El Salvador) Luis Ángel Firpo
3	DF	Marvin González^{*} (captain)	April 17, 1982 (aged 29)	82	(El Salvador) Águila
4	DF	Steve Purdy	February 5, 1985 (aged 26)	0	(United States) Portland Timbers
5	DF	Víctor Turcios	April 13, 1988 (aged 23)	18	(El Salvador) Luis Ángel Firpo
6	MF	Shawn Martin	February 15, 1987 (aged 24)	28	(El Salvador) Águila
7	MF	Ramón Sánchez^{*}	May 25, 1982 (aged 29)	65	(El Salvador) Águila
8	MF	Osael Romero^{*}	April 18, 1986 (aged 25)	51	(El Salvador) Águila
9	FW	Rudis Corrales	November 6, 1979 (aged 31)	71	(El Salvador) Alianza
10	MF	Eliseo Quintanilla	February 5, 1983 (aged 28)	51	(Guatemala) Municipal
11	FW	Rodolfo Zelaya	July 3, 1988 (aged 22)	24	(El Salvador) Alianza
12	MF	Arturo Alvarez	June 28, 1985 (aged 25)	16	(United States) Real Salt Lake
13	DF	Deris Umanzor	January 7, 1980 (aged 31)	43	(El Salvador) Águila
14	MF	Dennis Alas^{*}	January 10, 1985 (aged 26)	56	(El Salvador) Luis Ángel Firpo
15	MF	Edwin Sánchez	February 21, 1990 (aged 21)	6	(El Salvador) UES
16	MF	Jaime Alas	July 30, 1989 (aged 21)	10	(El Salvador) Luis Ángel Firpo
17	FW	Léster Blanco	January 17, 1989 (aged 22)	10	(El Salvador) Isidro Metapán
18	GK	Dagoberto Portillo^{*}	November 16, 1979 (aged 31)	11	(El Salvador) Once Municipal
19	DF	Reynaldo Hernández^{*}	November 11, 1984 (aged 26)	4	(El Salvador) Vista Hermosa
20	MF	Andrés Flores	August 31, 1990 (aged 20)	13	(El Salvador) Isidro Metapán
21	MF	Gilberto Baires	April 11, 1990 (aged 21)	5	(El Salvador) Atlético Marte
22	GK	Juan José Gómez	November 8, 1980 (aged 30)	61	(El Salvador) Luis Ángel Firpo
23	DF	Luis Anaya^{*}	May 19, 1981 (aged 30)	29	(El Salvador) UES

^{*}On September 20, 2013, the Salvadoran Football Federation banned fourteen Salvadoran players banned for life due to their involvement with match fixing while playing with the El Salvador national team over the previous two years, including 2011 CONCACAF Gold Cup players Dennis Alas, Luis Anaya, Marvin González, Reynaldo Hernández, Miguel Montes, Dagoberto Portillo, Osael Romero, Ramón Sánchez and Miguel Montes.

=== Mexico ===
Head coach: José Manuel de la Torre

No.	Pos.	Player	Date of birth (age)	Caps	Club
1	GK	Guillermo Ochoa^{*}	July 13, 1985 (aged 25)	44	(Mexico) América
2	DF	Francisco Rodríguez^{*}	October 20, 1981 (aged 29)	60	(Netherlands) PSV Eindhoven
3	DF	Carlos Salcido	April 2, 1980 (aged 31)	85	(England) Fulham
4	DF	Rafael Márquez (captain)	February 13, 1979 (aged 32)	100	(United States) New York Red Bulls
5	DF	Ricardo Osorio	March 30, 1980 (aged 31)	81	(Mexico) Monterrey
6	MF	Gerardo Torrado	April 30, 1979 (aged 32)	126	(Mexico) Cruz Azul
7	FW	Pablo Barrera	June 21, 1987 (aged 23)	32	(England) West Ham United
8	MF	Israel Castro	December 20, 1980 (aged 30)	37	(Mexico) Pumas UNAM
9	FW	Aldo de Nigris	July 22, 1983 (aged 27)	7	(Mexico) Monterrey
10	FW	Giovani dos Santos	May 11, 1989 (aged 22)	39	(Spain) Racing Santander
11	FW	Ángel Reyna	September 19, 1984 (aged 26)	4	(Mexico) América
12	GK	Alfredo Talavera	September 18, 1982 (aged 28)	1	(Mexico) Toluca
13	MF	Jesús Zavala	July 21, 1987 (aged 23)	1	(Mexico) Monterrey
14	FW	Javier Hernández	June 1, 1988 (aged 23)	23	(England) Manchester United
15	DF	Héctor Moreno	January 17, 1988 (aged 23)	19	(Netherlands) AZ
16	MF	Efraín Juárez	February 22, 1988 (aged 23)	28	(Scotland) Celtic
17	MF	Sinha^{*}	May 23, 1976 (aged 35)	51	(Mexico) Toluca
18	MF	Andrés Guardado	September 28, 1986 (aged 24)	66	(Spain) Deportivo La Coruña
19	DF	Édgar Dueñas^{*}	March 5, 1983 (aged 28)	7	(Mexico) Toluca
20	DF	Jorge Torres Nilo	January 16, 1988 (aged 23)	11	(Mexico) Tigres UANL
21	MF	Christian Bermúdez^{*}	April 26, 1987 (aged 24)	1	(Mexico) Atlante
22	FW	Elías Hernández	April 29, 1988 (aged 23)	6	(Mexico) Morelia
23	GK	Jonathan Orozco	May 12, 1986 (aged 25)	1	(Mexico) Monterrey

^{*}It was announced during the tournament on June 9, 2011, that five Mexican players, Sinha, Christian Bermúdez, Édgar Dueñas, Francisco Rodríguez and Guillermo Ochoa, all tested positive for clenbuterol prior to the Gold Cup, and had therefore been withdrawn from the squad. The CONCACAF Gold Cup Organizing Committee announced on June 19 that Mexico would be allowed to replace the suspended players. Mexico called up the following five players as replacements:

No.	Pos.	Player	Date of birth (age)	Caps	Club
1	GK	Luis Michel (standby)	July 21, 1979 (aged 31)	5	(Mexico) Guadalajara
2	DF	Héctor Reynoso	October 3, 1980 (aged 30)	0	(Mexico) Guadalajara
17	DF	Paul Aguilar	March 6, 1986 (aged 25)	15	(Mexico) Pachuca
19	MF	Marco Fabián (standby)	July 21, 1989 (aged 21)	0	(Mexico) Guadalajara
21	DF	Hiram Mier	August 25, 1989 (aged 21)	1	(Mexico) Monterrey

== Group B ==
=== Guatemala ===
Head coach: (Paraguay) Ever Almeida

No.	Pos.	Player	Date of birth (age)	Caps	Club
1	GK	Ricardo Jérez	February 4, 1986 (aged 25)	5	(Guatemala) USAC
2	DF	Henry Medina	March 16, 1981 (aged 30)	22	(Guatemala) Heredia
3	DF	Cristian Noriega	March 20, 1987 (aged 24)	17	(Guatemala) Municipal
4	DF	Carlos Castrillo	May 16, 1985 (aged 26)	12	(Guatemala) Comunicaciones
5	DF	Carlos Gallardo	April 8, 1984 (aged 27)	21	(Guatemala) USAC
6	DF	Gustavo Cabrera	December 13, 1979 (aged 31)	81	(Guatemala) Municipal
7	DF	Elías Vásquez	June 18, 1992 (aged 18)	0	(Guatemala) Comunicaciones
8	MF	Gonzalo Romero	March 25, 1975 (aged 36)	73	(Guatemala) Municipal
9	MF	Wilfred Velásquez	September 10, 1985 (aged 25)	4	(Guatemala) Suchitepéquez
10	MF	José Manuel Contreras	January 19, 1986 (aged 25)	28	(Guatemala) Comunicaciones
11	FW	Henry López	August 8, 1992 (aged 18)	0	(Brazil) Noroeste
12	GK	Paulo César Motta	March 29, 1982 (aged 29)	13	(Guatemala) Mictlán
13	DF	Edwin González	February 22, 1982 (aged 29)	6	(Guatemala) Mictlán
14	MF	Carlos Figueroa	April 19, 1980 (aged 31)	38	(Guatemala) Xelajú
15	MF	Manuel León	September 23, 1987 (aged 23)	1	(Guatemala) USAC
16	MF	Marco Pappa	November 15, 1987 (aged 23)	15	(United States) Chicago Fire
17	FW	Dwight Pezzarossi	September 4, 1979 (aged 31)	54	(Guatemala) Comunicaciones
18	FW	Óscar Isaula	October 9, 1982 (aged 28)	0	(Guatemala) Malacateco
19	DF	José del Águila	March 7, 1991 (aged 20)	0	(Guatemala) Comunicaciones
20	FW	Carlos Ruiz (captain)	September 15, 1979 (aged 31)	87	(United States) Philadelphia Union
21	GK	Juan Paredes	November 27, 1984 (aged 26)	0	(Guatemala) Comunicaciones
23	FW	Jairo Arreola	September 20, 1985 (aged 25)	2	(Guatemala) Comunicaciones
24	MF	Jonathan López	May 10, 1988 (aged 23)	4	(Guatemala) Marquense

=== Grenada ===
Head coach: (England) Mike Adams

No.	Pos.	Player	Date of birth (age)	Caps	Club
1	GK	Andray Baptiste	April 15, 1977 (aged 34)		(England) Ashford Town
2	DF	David Cyrus	March 8, 1989 (aged 22)		(England) Bradford Park Avenue
3	DF	Shanon Phillip	November 9, 1988 (aged 22)		(Grenada) Hurricane
4	MF	Craig Rocastle	August 17, 1981 (aged 29)		(United States) Sporting Kansas City
5	DF	Cassim Langaigne	February 27, 1980 (aged 31)		(Grenada) Hurricane
6	DF	Marc Marshall	December 24, 1985 (aged 25)		Grenada Boys' Secondary School
7	FW	Marcus Julien	December 30, 1986 (aged 24)		(Grenada) Eagles Super Strikers
8	FW	Delroy Facey	April 22, 1980 (aged 31)		(England) Lincoln City
9	MF	Ricky Charles	June 19, 1975 (aged 35)		(Grenada) Anchor Queens Park Rangers
11	DF	Anthony Modeste (captain)	August 30, 1975 (aged 35)		(Jamaica) Portmore United
12	MF	Clive Murray	December 5, 1990 (aged 20)		(Grenada) Paradise
13	MF	Dwayne Leo	June 28, 1982 (aged 28)		(Grenada) South Stars
14	DF	Leon Johnson	May 10, 1981 (aged 30)		(England) Wycombe Wanderers
15	DF	Anthony Straker	September 23, 1988 (aged 22)		(England) Aldershot Town
16	FW	Lancaster Joseph	August 27, 1982 (aged 28)		(Grenada) Hurricane
17	DF	Moron Phillip	March 19, 1992 (aged 19)		(Grenada) Hurricane
19	FW	Patrick Modeste	September 30, 1976 (aged 34)		(Grenada) Anchor Queens Park Rangers
20	MF	Shane Rennie	December 14, 1986 (aged 24)		(Grenada) Paradise
21	MF	Shalrie Joseph	May 24, 1978 (aged 33)		(United States) New England Revolution
22	FW	Bradley Bubb	May 20, 1987 (aged 23)		(England) Aldershot Town
23	FW	Junior Williams	November 3, 1987 (aged 23)		(Grenada) Anchor Queens Park Rangers
30	GK	Shemel Louison	August 9, 1990 (aged 20)		(Grenada) Fontenoy United
34	GK	Desmond Noel	November 28, 1974 (aged 36)		(Grenada) Anchor Queens Park Rangers

=== Honduras ===
Head coach: (Colombia) Luis Fernando Suárez

No.	Pos.	Player	Date of birth (age)	Caps	Club
1	GK	Orlin Vallecillo	July 1, 1983 (aged 27)	8	(Honduras) Marathón
2	DF	Osman Chávez	July 29, 1984 (aged 26)	36	(Poland) Wisła Kraków
4	DF	Johnny Leverón	February 7, 1990 (aged 21)	8	(Honduras) Motagua
5	DF	Víctor Bernárdez	May 24, 1982 (aged 29)	42	(Belgium) Lierse
6	MF	Hendry Thomas	February 23, 1985 (aged 26)	46	(England) Wigan Athletic
7	MF	Emil Martínez	September 17, 1982 (aged 28)	59	(Honduras) Marathón
8	MF	Wilson Palacios	July 29, 1984 (aged 26)	74	(England) Tottenham Hotspur
9	FW	Jerry Bengtson	April 8, 1987 (aged 24)	8	(Honduras) Motagua
10	MF	Ramón Núñez	November 14, 1985 (aged 25)	40	(England) Leeds United
12	MF	Alfredo Mejía	April 3, 1990 (aged 21)	5	(Honduras) Real España
13	FW	Carlo Costly	July 18, 1982 (aged 28)	42	(Mexico) Atlas
14	MF	Boniek García	September 4, 1984 (aged 26)	50	(Honduras) Olimpia
15	FW	Walter Martínez	March 28, 1982 (aged 29)	45	(China) Beijing Guoan
16	DF	Mauricio Sabillón	November 11, 1978 (aged 32)	34	(Honduras) Marathón
17	MF	Roger Espinoza	October 25, 1986 (aged 24)	16	(United States) Sporting Kansas City
18	GK	Noel Valladares (captain)	May 3, 1977 (aged 34)	88	(Honduras) Olimpia
19	MF	Javier Portillo	June 10, 1981 (aged 29)	0	(Honduras) Vida
21	DF	Juan Garcia	March 8, 1988 (aged 23)	0	(Honduras) Olimpia
22	GK	Donis Escober	February 3, 1980 (aged 31)	12	(Honduras) Olimpia
23	MF	Edder Delgado	November 20, 1986 (aged 24)	4	(Honduras) Real España
24	DF	Brayan Beckeles	November 28, 1985 (aged 25)	3	(Honduras) Vida
25	FW	Eddie Hernández	January 28, 1991 (aged 20)	0	(Honduras) Platense

=== Jamaica ===
Head coach: Theodore Whitmore

No.	Pos.	Player	Date of birth (age)	Caps	Club
1	GK	Donovan Ricketts	June 7, 1977 (aged 33)	84	(United States) Los Angeles Galaxy
2	MF	Richard Edwards	July 29, 1983 (aged 27)	24	(Jamaica) Harbour View
3	DF	Dicoy Williams	October 7, 1986 (aged 24)	8	(Canada) Toronto FC
4	MF	Shavar Thomas (captain)	January 29, 1981 (aged 30)	40	(United States) Sporting Kansas City
5	DF	Ian Goodison	November 21, 1972 (aged 38)	113	(England) Tranmere Rovers
6	DF	Jermaine Taylor	January 14, 1985 (aged 26)	51	(United States) Houston Dynamo
7	MF	Jason Morrison	June 7, 1984 (aged 26)	25	(Norway) Aalesund
8	FW	Eric Vernan	July 4, 1987 (aged 23)	23	(Jamaica) Portmore United
9	FW	Ryan Johnson	November 26, 1984 (aged 26)	11	(United States) San Jose Earthquakes
10	FW	Omar Cummings	July 13, 1982 (aged 28)	23	(United States) Colorado Rapids
11	FW	Dane Richards	December 14, 1983 (aged 27)	28	(United States) New York Red Bulls
12	DF	Demar Phillips	September 23, 1983 (aged 27)	42	(Norway) Aalesund
13	GK	Dwayne Miller	July 14, 1987 (aged 23)	18	(Sweden) Syrianska
14	DF	Tyrone Marshall	November 12, 1974 (aged 36)	82	(United States) Colorado Rapids
15	DF	Je-Vaughn Watson	October 22, 1983 (aged 27)	8	(United States) Houston Dynamo
16	DF	Omar Daley	April 25, 1981 (aged 30)	63	(England) Bradford City
17	MF	Rodolph Austin	June 1, 1985 (aged 26)	38	(Norway) Brann
18	MF	Keammar Daley	February 18, 1988 (aged 23)	15	(Jamaica) Tivoli Gardens
19	DF	Adrian Reid	March 10, 1985 (aged 26)	24	(Norway) Vålerenga
20	FW	Navion Boyd	October 10, 1988 (aged 22)	12	(Jamaica) Tivoli Gardens
21	FW	Luton Shelton	November 11, 1985 (aged 25)	55	(Norway) Vålerenga
22	MF	Damion Williams	February 20, 1981 (aged 30)	12	(Norway) Nybergsund
23	GK	Duwayne Kerr	January 16, 1987 (aged 24)	6	(Norway) Strømmen

== Group C ==
=== Canada ===
Head coach: (Trinidad and Tobago) Stephen Hart

No.	Pos.	Player	Date of birth (age)	Caps	Club
1	GK	Lars Hirschfeld	October 17, 1978 (aged 32)	33	(Norway) Vålerenga
2	MF	Nikolas Ledgerwood	January 16, 1985 (aged 26)	7	(Germany) Wehen Wiesbaden
3	DF	Mike Klukowski	May 27, 1981 (aged 30)	29	(Turkey) Manisaspor
4	DF	Kevin McKenna (captain)	January 21, 1980 (aged 31)	49	(Germany) 1. FC Köln
5	DF	André Hainault	June 17, 1986 (aged 24)	18	(United States) Houston Dynamo
6	MF	Julian de Guzman	March 25, 1981 (aged 30)	44	(Canada) Toronto FC
7	MF	Terry Dunfield	February 20, 1982 (aged 29)	2	(Canada) Vancouver Whitecaps FC
8	MF	Will Johnson	January 21, 1987 (aged 24)	15	(United States) Real Salt Lake
9	FW	Rob Friend	January 23, 1981 (aged 30)	29	(Germany) Hertha BSC
10	FW	Ali Gerba	September 4, 1981 (aged 29)	29	(Canada) Montreal Impact
11	MF	Josh Simpson	May 15, 1983 (aged 28)	32	(Turkey) Manisaspor
12	MF	Pedro Pacheco	June 27, 1984 (aged 26)	3	(Portugal) Santa Clara
13	MF	Atiba Hutchinson	February 8, 1983 (aged 28)	52	(Netherlands) PSV Eindhoven
14	FW	Dwayne De Rosario	May 15, 1978 (aged 33)	55	(United States) New York Red Bulls
15	DF	David Edgar	May 19, 1987 (aged 24)	2	(England) Burnley
16	FW	Tosaint Ricketts	August 6, 1987 (aged 23)	2	(Romania) Politehnica Timișoara
17	FW	Simeon Jackson	March 28, 1987 (aged 24)	15	(England) Norwich City
18	GK	Milan Borjan	October 23, 1987 (aged 23)	2	(Serbia) Rad Beograd
19	DF	Marcel de Jong	October 15, 1986 (aged 24)	16	(Germany) FC Augsburg
20	DF	Jaime Peters	May 4, 1987 (aged 24)	24	(England) Ipswich Town
21	MF	Jonathan Beaulieu-Bourgault	September 27, 1988 (aged 22)	3	(Germany) Preußen Münster
22	GK	Haidar Al-Shaïbani	March 31, 1984 (aged 27)	1	(France) Nîmes
23	MF	Issey Nakajima-Farran	May 16, 1984 (aged 27)	24	(Denmark) Horsens

=== Guadeloupe ===
Head coach: Roger Salnot

No.	Pos.	Player	Date of birth (age)	Caps	Club
1	GK	Franck Grandel	March 17, 1978 (aged 33)	13	(France) Dijon
2	DF	Miguel Comminges	March 16, 1982 (aged 29)	10	(England) Southend United
3	DF	Stéphane Zubar	October 9, 1986 (aged 24)	0	(England) Plymouth Argyle
4	DF	Ulick Lupede	June 1, 1984 (aged 27)	4	(Portugal) Covilhã
5	DF	Eddy Viator	June 2, 1982 (aged 29)	11	Unattached
6	MF	David Fleurival	February 19, 1984 (aged 27)	14	(France) Metz
7	FW	Loïc Loval	September 28, 1981 (aged 29)	13	(France) Vannes
8	MF	Dimitri Fautrai	February 24, 1986 (aged 25)	5	(Guadeloupe) Morne-à-l'Eau
9	FW	Ludovic Gotin	July 25, 1985 (aged 25)	20	(Guadeloupe) Le Moule
10	MF	Therry Racon	May 1, 1984 (aged 27)	0	(England) Charlton Athletic
11	MF	Livio Nabab	June 14, 1988 (aged 22)	8	(France) Caen
12	MF	Thomas Gamiette	June 21, 1986 (aged 24)	4	(France) Reims
13	DF	Jean-Luc Lambourde	April 10, 1980 (aged 31)	37	(Guadeloupe) Amical Club
14	MF	Grégory Gendrey	July 10, 1986 (aged 24)	20	(Belgium) Olympic Charleroi
15	DF	Julien Ictoi	March 22, 1978 (aged 33)	12	(Guadeloupe) Le Moule
16	GK	Fabrice Mercury	August 6, 1981 (aged 29)	14	(Guadeloupe) Le Moule
17	FW	Cédric Collet	March 7, 1984 (aged 27)	11	(France) Beauvais
18	FW	Brice Jovial	January 25, 1984 (aged 27)	0	(France) Le Havre
19	MF	Stéphane Auvray (captain)	September 4, 1981 (aged 29)	19	(United States) Sporting Kansas City
20	MF	Larry Clavier	January 9, 1981 (aged 30)	10	(Portugal) Freamunde
21	FW	Richard Socrier	March 28, 1979 (aged 32)	5	(France) Ajaccio
22	DF	Mickaël Tacalfred	April 23, 1981 (aged 30)	8	(France) Reims
23	GK	Christophe Olol	August 30, 1980 (aged 30)	0	(Guadeloupe) Sainte-Rose

=== Panama ===
Head coach: Julio Dely Valdés

No.	Pos.	Player	Date of birth (age)	Caps	Club
1	GK	Jaime Penedo	September 26, 1981 (aged 29)		(Guatemala) Municipal
3	DF	Harold Cummings	March 1, 1992 (aged 19)		(Uruguay) River Plate
4	MF	Aramis Haywood	April 3, 1985 (aged 26)		(Panama) Plaza Amador
5	DF	Román Torres	March 20, 1986 (aged 25)		(Colombia) Atlético Nacional
6	MF	Gabriel Gómez	May 29, 1984 (aged 27)		(Colombia) La Equidad
7	FW	Blas Pérez	March 13, 1981 (aged 30)		(Mexico) León
8	MF	Gabriel Torres	October 13, 1988 (aged 22)		(Panama) San Francisco
9	FW	Renán Addles	November 7, 1989 (aged 21)		(Bolivia) The Strongest
10	MF	Nelson Barahona	November 22, 1987 (aged 23)		(Venezuela) Caracas
11	MF	Armando Cooper	November 26, 1987 (aged 23)		(Panama) Árabe Unido
12	GK	Luis Mejía	March 16, 1991 (aged 20)		(France) Toulouse
13	DF	Adolfo Machado	February 14, 1985 (aged 26)		(Guatemala) Comunicaciones
14	DF	Eduardo Dasent	October 12, 1988 (aged 22)		(Colombia) Atlético Bucaramanga
15	DF	Eric Davis	March 31, 1991 (aged 20)		(Panama) Árabe Unido
16	FW	Luis Rentería	September 13, 1988 (aged 22)		(Colombia) Real Cartagena
17	DF	Luis Henríquez	November 23, 1981 (aged 29)		(Poland) Lech Poznań
18	FW	Luis Tejada	August 23, 1982 (aged 28)		(Peru) Juan Aurich
19	FW	Alberto Quintero	December 18, 1987 (aged 23)		(Spain) Ontinyent
20	MF	Aníbal Godoy	February 10, 1990 (aged 21)		(Panama) Chepo
21	MF	Amílcar Henríquez	August 2, 1983 (aged 27)		(Colombia) Atlético Huila
22	MF	Eybir Bonaga	May 19, 1986 (aged 25)		(Panama) San Francisco
23	DF	Felipe Baloy (captain)	February 24, 1981 (aged 30)		(Mexico) Santos Laguna
24	GK	Kevin Melgar	November 19, 1992 (aged 18)		(Panama) Alianza

=== United States ===
Head coach: (United States) Bob Bradley

No.	Pos.	Player	Date of birth (age)	Caps	Club
1	GK	Tim Howard	March 6, 1979 (aged 32)	58	(England) Everton
2	DF	Jonathan Spector	March 1, 1986 (aged 25)	30	(England) West Ham United
3	DF	Carlos Bocanegra (captain)	May 25, 1979 (aged 32)	87	(France) Saint-Étienne
4	MF	Michael Bradley	July 31, 1987 (aged 23)	52	(Germany) Borussia Mönchengladbach
5	DF	Oguchi Onyewu	May 13, 1982 (aged 29)	59	(Netherlands) Twente
6	DF	Steve Cherundolo	February 19, 1979 (aged 32)	65	(Germany) Hannover 96
7	MF	Maurice Edu	April 18, 1986 (aged 25)	21	(Scotland) Rangers
8	FW	Clint Dempsey	March 9, 1983 (aged 28)	70	(England) Fulham
9	FW	Juan Agudelo	November 23, 1992 (aged 18)	4	(United States) New York Red Bulls
10	FW	Landon Donovan	March 4, 1982 (aged 29)	130	(United States) Los Angeles Galaxy
11	FW	Chris Wondolowski	January 28, 1983 (aged 28)	1	(United States) San Jose Earthquakes
12	DF	Jonathan Bornstein	November 7, 1984 (aged 26)	37	(Mexico) Tigres UANL
13	MF	Jermaine Jones	November 3, 1981 (aged 29)	4	(Germany) Schalke 04
14	DF	Eric Lichaj	November 17, 1988 (aged 22)	3	(England) Aston Villa
15	DF	Tim Ream	October 5, 1987 (aged 23)	3	(United States) New York Red Bulls
16	MF	Sacha Kljestan	September 9, 1985 (aged 25)	26	(Belgium) Anderlecht
17	FW	Jozy Altidore	November 6, 1989 (aged 21)	34	(Spain) Villarreal
18	GK	Nick Rimando	June 17, 1979 (aged 31)	5	(United States) Real Salt Lake
19	MF	Robbie Rogers	May 12, 1987 (aged 24)	13	(United States) Columbus Crew
20	FW	Freddy Adu	June 2, 1989 (aged 22)	15	(Portugal) Benfica
21	DF	Clarence Goodson	May 17, 1982 (aged 29)	17	(Denmark) Brøndby
22	MF	Alejandro Bedoya	April 29, 1987 (aged 24)	8	(Sweden) Örebro
23	GK	Marcus Hahnemann	June 15, 1972 (aged 38)	9	(England) Wolverhampton Wanderers

== Player statistics ==
Player representation by club

Three or more players

Players	Clubs
8	(Guatemala) Comunicaciones
6	(Guatemala) Municipal
5	(El Salvador) Águila, (El Salvador) Luis Ángel Firpo, (United States) New York Red Bulls, (Costa Rica) Saprissa
4	(Cuba) Ciudad de La Habana, (Mexico) Monterrey, (Grenada) Hurricane, (United States) Real Salt Lake, (United States) Sporting Kansas City, (Mexico) Toluca, (Cuba) Villa Clara
3	(Costa Rica) Alajuelense, (Grenada) Anchor Queens Park Rangers, (Cuba) Ciego de Ávila, (United States) Houston Dynamo, (El Salvador) Isidro Metapán, (Honduras) Marathón, (Honduras) Motagua, (Guadeloupe) Moulien, (Honduras) Olimpia, (Guatemala) USAC, (Norway) Vålerenga

Player representation by league

CONCACAF nations only

Country	Players	Percentage	Outside national squad
Total	276		
United States	31	11.23%	24
Guatemala	23	8.33%	3
Cuba	23	8.33%	0
El Salvador	20	7.24%	0
Mexico	18	6.52%	4
Honduras	14	5.07%	1
Grenada	13	4.71%	0
Costa Rica	12	4.35%	0
Guadeloupe	7	2.53%	0
Panama	7	2.53%	0
Jamaica	5	1.81%	1
Canada	4	1.45%	1
(United Nations) Others	119	43.12%	

The Cuban squad was made up entirely of players from its domestic league.
