= 2011 CONCACAF Gold Cup Group A =

Group A of the 2011 CONCACAF Gold Cup was one of three groups competing at the tournament. The group's first round of matches were played on June 5, with the final round played on June 12. All six group matches were played at venues in the United States, in Arlington, Charlotte and Chicago. The group consisted of five-time Gold Cup champions, Mexico, as well as Costa Rica, El Salvador and Cuba.

== Mexico vs El Salvador drug test controversy ==
On June 5, 2011, Mexico defeated El Salvador, 5–0, in the first fixture for both teams.

Three days later, on the eve of Mexico's second fixture against Cuba, the Mexican Football Federation removed five players from their squad due to substance abuse. These players included starting goalkeeper, Guillermo Ochoa, starting center back Francisco Rodríguez and the following reserves: Sinha, Christian Bermúdez and Édgar Dueñas. The drug they tested positive for was clenbuterol, which is used in animals to produce lean meat. The supposition for the players being injected with this substance was from eating chicken that had traceable amounts of clenbuterol in it. Reports begin breaking on June 6 and were official on June 9. The "B" samples of those five involving players have been negative.

Two years later, on September 20, 2013, the Salvadoran Football Federation banned 14 Salvadoran players for life due to their involvement with match fixing while playing with the El Salvador national team over the previous two years, including 8 players (Dennis Alas, Luis Anaya, captain Marvin González, Reynaldo Hernández, Miguel Montes, Dagoberto Portillo, Osael Romero, Ramón Sánchez and Miguel Montes), from El Salvador's 5–0 loss to Mexico on June 5 at the 2011 CONCACAF Gold Cup.

== Standings ==
Key to colors in group tables
Teams that advanced to the quarterfinals: Group winners; Group runners-up; Best two third-placed teams among all groups

Pos	Team	Pld	W	D	L	GF	GA	GD	Pts	Qualification
1	Mexico	3	3	0	0	14	1	+13	9	Advance to knockout stage
2	Costa Rica	3	1	1	1	7	5	+2	4	Advance to knockout stage
3	El Salvador	3	1	1	1	7	7	0	4	Advance to knockout stage
4	Cuba	3	0	0	3	1	16	−15	0	

Source: CONCACAF

== Matches ==
All times are U.S. Eastern Daylight Time (UTC−4) (local times in parentheses)

=== Costa Rica vs Cuba ===
June 5, 2011
18:00 (17:00 UTC−5)

Costa Rica	5–0	Cuba
Ureña 7', 46'; Saborío 41'; Mora 47'; Campbell 71'	Report

Cowboys Stadium, Arlington
Attendance: 80,108
Referee: Roberto Moreno (Panama)

Costa Rica	Cuba

GK	1	Keylor Navas
RB	4	José Salvatierra
CB	3	Jhonny Acosta
CB	15	Júnior Díaz
LB	20	Dennis Marshall
CM	6	Heiner Mora
CM	5	Celso Borges (c)
CM	14	Bryan Oviedo
AM	7	Christian Bolaños		(substituted off) 68'
CF	16	Marco Ureña	(yellow card) 32'	(substituted off) 56'
CF	9	Álvaro Saborío		(substituted off) 68'
Substitutions:
FW	12	Joel Campbell		(substituted on) 56'
FW	17	Josué Martínez		(substituted on) 68'
FW	21	Randall Brenes		(substituted on) 68'
Manager:
(Argentina) Ricardo La Volpe

GK	1	Odelín Molina
RB	16	Reysander Fernández
CB	14	Aliannis Urgellés
CB	3	Yénier Márquez
LB	6	Yoel Colomé
RM	7	Marcel Hernández	(substituted off) 79'
CM	8	Jaime Colomé (c)
CM	2	Carlos Francisco
LM	20	Alberto Gómez	(substituted off) 74'
SS	9	Alain Cervantes
CF	15	Yaudel Lahera	(substituted off) 60'
Substitutions:
MF	10	Roberto Linares	(substituted on) 60'
FW	18	Dagoberto Quesada	(substituted on) 74'
FW	17	Yosniel Mesa	(substituted on) 79'
Manager:
Raúl González

Assistant referees:
Daniel Williamson (Panama)
Oscar Velasquez (Honduras)
Fourth official:
José Molina (Honduras)

=== Mexico vs El Salvador ===
June 5, 2011
20:00 (19:00 UTC−5)

Mexico	5–0	El Salvador
Juárez 56'; De Nigris 58'; J. Hernández 60', 67', 90+5' (pen.)	Report

Cowboys Stadium, Arlington
Attendance: 80,108
Referee: Enrico Wijngaarde (Suriname)

Mexico	El Salvador

GK	1	Guillermo Ochoa
RB	16	Efraín Juárez
CB	2	Francisco Rodríguez	(yellow card) 26'
CB	15	Héctor Moreno
LB	3	Carlos Salcido
CM	6	Gerardo Torrado (c)
CM	8	Israel Castro		(substituted off) 57'
RW	7	Pablo Barrera
LW	18	Andrés Guardado		(substituted off) 74'
SS	10	Giovani dos Santos		(substituted off) 69'
CF	14	Javier Hernández	(yellow card) 28'
Substitutions:
FW	9	Aldo de Nigris		(substituted on) 57'
DF	4	Rafael Márquez		(substituted on) 69'
FW	11	Ángel Reyna		(substituted on) 74'
Manager:
José Manuel de la Torre

GK	1	Miguel Montes
CB	2	Xavier García
CB	23	Luis Anaya
CB	5	Víctor Turcios		(substituted off) 62'
RM	16	Jaime Alas
CM	20	Andrés Flores		(substituted off) 68'
CM	10	Eliseo Quintanilla
CM	14	Dennis Alas	(yellow card) 62'
LM	19	Reynaldo Hernández
SS	3	Marvin González (c)	(red card) 90+3'
CF	11	Rodolfo Zelaya		(substituted off) 79'
Substitutions:
MF	21	Gilberto Baires		(substituted on) 62'
MF	6	Shawn Martin		(substituted on) 68'
FW	9	Rudis Corrales		(substituted on) 79'
Manager:
(Uruguay) Rubén Israel

Assistant referees:
Ricardo Morgan (Jamaica)
Charles Morgante (United States)
Fourth official:
Courtney Campbell (Jamaica)

=== Costa Rica vs El Salvador ===
June 9, 2011
19:00

Costa Rica	1–1	El Salvador
Brenes 90+5'	Report	Zelaya 45'

Bank of America Stadium, Charlotte
Attendance: 30,530
Referee: Jair Marrufo (United States)

Costa Rica	El Salvador

GK	1	Keylor Navas
RB	4	José Salvatierra	(yellow card) 37'
CB	3	Jhonny Acosta	(yellow card) 63'
CB	15	Júnior Díaz
LB	20	Dennis Marshall
CM	6	Heiner Mora		(substituted off) 80'
CM	5	Celso Borges (c)	(yellow card) 56'
CM	24	Allen Guevara
AM	7	Christian Bolaños		(substituted off) 62'
CF	16	Marco Ureña		(substituted off) 46'
CF	9	Álvaro Saborío
Substitutions:
MF	10	Bryan Ruiz		(substituted on) 46'
FW	12	Joel Campbell		(substituted on) 62'
FW	21	Randall Brenes		(substituted on) 80'
Manager:
(Argentina) Ricardo La Volpe

GK	1	Miguel Montes	(yellow card) 53'
RB	16	Jaime Alas
CB	2	Xavier García
CB	5	Victor Turcios	(yellow card) 78'
LB	19	Reynaldo Hernández
DM	23	Luis Anaya (c)
RM	20	Andrés Flores		(substituted off) 72'
CM	21	Gilberto Baires	(yellow card) 10'	(substituted off) 46'
LM	14	Dennis Alas
CF	9	Rudis Corrales		(substituted off) 62'
CF	11	Rodolfo Zelaya	(yellow card) 75'
Substitutions:
MF	7	Ramón Sánchez		(substituted on) 46'
MF	10	Eliseo Quintanilla		(substituted on) 62'
MF	6	Shawn Martin		(substituted on) 72'
Manager:
(Uruguay) Rubén Israel

Assistant referees:
Charles Morgante (United States)
Ramon Louisville (Suriname)
Fourth official:
José Molina (Honduras)

=== Cuba vs Mexico ===
June 9, 2011
21:00

Cuba	0–5	Mexico
	Report	J. Hernández 36', 76'; Dos Santos 63', 68'; De Nigris 65'

Bank of America Stadium, Charlotte
Attendance: 46,012
Referee: Courtney Campbell (Jamaica)

Cuba	Mexico

GK	1	Odelín Molina
RB	16	Reysander Fernández
CB	4	Hánier Dranguet
CB	3	Yénier Márquez
LB	6	Yoel Colomé	(substituted off) 73'
CM	8	Jaime Colomé (c)
CM	2	Carlos Francisco
RW	7	Marcel Hernández
LW	20	Alberto Gómez
SS	9	Alain Cervantes	(substituted off) 11'
CF	10	Roberto Linares	(substituted off) 70'
Substitutions:
DF	14	Aliannis Urgellés	(substituted on) 11'
FW	15	Yaudel Lahera	(substituted on) 70'
MF	18	Dagoberto Quesada	(substituted on) 73'
Manager:
Raúl González

GK	12	Alfredo Talavera
RB	16	Efraín Juárez
CB	4	Rafael Márquez (c)	(substituted off) 72'
CB	15	Héctor Moreno
LB	3	Carlos Salcido
DM	6	Gerardo Torrado
CM	18	Andrés Guardado	(substituted off) 66'
RW	7	Pablo Barrera	(substituted off) 64'
LW	11	Ángel Reyna
SS	10	Giovani dos Santos
CF	14	Javier Hernández
Substitutions:
FW	9	Aldo de Nigris	(substituted on) 64'
FW	22	Elías Hernández	(substituted on) 66'
DF	20	Jorge Torres Nilo	(substituted on) 72'
Manager:
José Manuel de la Torre

Assistant referees:
Ricardo Morgan (Jamaica)
Daniel Williamson (Panama)
Fourth official:
Raúl Castro (Honduras)

=== El Salvador vs Cuba ===
June 12, 2011
18:00 (17:00 UTC−5)

El Salvador	6–1	Cuba
Zelaya 13', 71'; Romero 29'; Blanco 69'; Alvarez 84'; Quintanilla 90+4'	Report	Márquez 83'

Soldier Field, Chicago
Attendance: 62,000
Referee: Neal Brizan (Trinidad and Tobago)

El Salvador	Cuba

GK	1	Miguel Montes
CB	2	Xavier García	(yellow card) 82'
CB	23	Luis Anaya (c)
CB	5	Víctor Turcios
RM	16	Jaime Alas
CM	20	Andrés Flores		(substituted off) 63'
CM	8	Osael Romero
CM	14	Dennis Alas
LM	19	Reynaldo Hernández		(substituted off) 72'
CF	9	Rudis Corrales		(substituted off) 68'
CF	11	Rodolfo Zelaya
Substitutions:
MF	12	Arturo Alvarez		(substituted on) 63'
FW	17	Léster Blanco		(substituted on) 68'
MF	10	Eliseo Quintanilla		(substituted on) 72'
Manager:
(Uruguay) Rubén Israel

GK	12	Julio Pichardo
RB	16	Reysander Fernández	(yellow card) 32'
CB	14	Aliannis Urgellés	(yellow card) 45'
CB	3	Yénier Márquez
LB	4	Hánier Dranguet
DM	6	Yoel Colomé		(substituted off) 75'
CM	8	Jaime Colomé (c)		(substituted off) 52'
CM	2	Carlos Francisco
RW	7	Marcel Hernández
LW	20	Alberto Gómez
CF	10	Roberto Linares		(substituted off) 62'
Substitutions:
MF	19	Francisco Carrazana		(substituted on) 52'
FW	15	Yaudel Lahera		(substituted on) 62'
MF	18	Dagoberto Quesada		(substituted on) 75'
Manager:
Raúl González Triana

Assistant referees:
Oscar Velasquez (Honduras)
Ramon Ricardo Louisville (Suriname)
Fourth official:
Enrico Wijngaarde (Suriname)

=== Mexico vs Costa Rica ===
June 12, 2011
20:00 (19:00 UTC−5)

Mexico	4–1	Costa Rica
Márquez 17'; Guardado 19', 26'; Barrera 38'	Report	Ureña 69'

Soldier Field, Chicago
Attendance: 62,000
Referee: Roberto Moreno (Panama)

Mexico	Costa Rica

GK	12	Alfredo Talavera
RB	16	Efraín Juárez	(yellow card) 53'
CB	4	Rafael Márquez (c)		(substituted off) 70'
CB	15	Héctor Moreno
LB	3	Carlos Salcido
CM	6	Gerardo Torrado
CM	8	Israel Castro
RW	7	Pablo Barrera		(substituted off) 61'
LW	18	Andrés Guardado	(yellow card) 59'
SS	10	Giovani dos Santos
CF	14	Javier Hernández		(substituted off) 83'
Substitutions:
FW	11	Ángel Reyna		(substituted on) 61'
DF	20	Jorge Torres Nilo		(substituted on) 70'
FW	9	Aldo de Nigris		(substituted on) 83'
Manager:
José Manuel de la Torre

GK	1	Keylor Navas
RB	4	José Salvatierra
CB	3	Jhonny Acosta
CB	15	Júnior Díaz		(substituted off) 85'
LB	20	Dennis Marshall
CM	6	Heiner Mora		(substituted off) 46'
CM	5	Celso Borges (c)
CM	24	Allen Guevara		(substituted off) 46'
AM	10	Bryan Ruiz
SS	7	Christian Bolaños	(yellow card) 29'
CF	9	Álvaro Saborío
Substitutions:
FW	16	Marco Ureña		(substituted on) 46'
DF	19	Óscar Duarte		(substituted on) 46'
MF	11	Diego Madrigal		(substituted on) 85'
Manager:
(Argentina) Ricardo La Volpe

Assistant referees:
Daniel Williamson (Panama)
Ricardo Morgan (Jamaica)
Fourth official:
Raúl Castro (Honduras)
