= 2011 CONCACAF Gold Cup knockout stage =

The knockout stage of the 2011 CONCACAF Gold Cup started on June 18 and ended with the final on June 25, 2011. The group winners and runners-up and the two best third placed teams from the group stage qualified.

All times are U.S. Eastern Daylight Time (UTC−4) (local times in parentheses)

== Qualified teams ==
Group	Winners	Runners-up	Third place (Best two qualified)
A	Mexico	Costa Rica	El Salvador
B	Jamaica	Honduras	Guatemala
C	Panama	United States	—N/a

== Bracket ==
The tournament bracket is shown below, with bold denoting the winners of each match.

Quarterfinals
June 19 – Washington, D.C.
Jamaica	0
**United States**	**2**
June 19 – Washington, D.C.
**Panama (p)**	**1 (5)**
El Salvador	1 (3)
June 18 – East Rutherford
Costa Rica	1 (2)
**Honduras (p)**	**1 (4)**
June 18 – East Rutherford
**Mexico**	**2**
Guatemala	1

Semifinals
June 22 – Houston
**United States**	**1**
Panama	0
June 22 – Houston
Honduras	0
**Mexico (a.e.t.)**	**2**

Final
June 25 – Pasadena
United States	2
**Mexico**	**4**

== Quarterfinals ==
=== Costa Rica vs Honduras ===
June 18, 2011
17:00

Costa Rica	1–1 (a.e.t.)	Honduras
Marshall 56'	Report	Bengtson 49'
Penalties
Borges (penalty missed); Ruiz (penalty scored); Saborío (penalty missed); Campbell (penalty scored)	2–4	(penalty scored) Costly; (penalty scored) Bernárdez; (penalty scored) Palacios; (penalty scored) Bengtson

New Meadowlands Stadium, East Rutherford
Attendance: 78,807
Referee: Roberto Moreno (Panama)

**Costa Rica**	**Honduras**

GK	1	Keylor Navas
RB	4	José Salvatierra	(yellow card) 60'
CB	15	Júnior Díaz		(substituted off) 46'
CB	3	Jhonny Acosta
LB	20	Dennis Marshall
CM	7	Christian Bolaños		(substituted off) 69'
CM	5	Celso Borges (c)
CM	14	Bryan Oviedo
AM	10	Bryan Ruiz
CF	16	Marco Ureña		(substituted off) 108'
CF	9	Álvaro Saborío
Substitutions:
DF	6	Heiner Mora		(substituted on) 46'
FW	11	Diego Madrigal		(substituted on) 69'
FW	12	Joel Campbell		(substituted on) 108'
Manager:
(Argentina) Ricardo La Volpe

GK	18	Noel Valladares (c)	(yellow card) 75'
RB	5	Víctor Bernárdez	(yellow card) 73'
CB	16	Mauricio Sabillón
CB	21	Juan Garcia
LB	2	Osman Chávez
CM	14	Óscar García	(yellow card) 4'
CM	17	Roger Espinoza		(substituted off) 81'
RW	6	Hendry Thomas	(yellow card) 70'	(substituted off) 90+3'
LW	19	Javier Portillo	(yellow card) 78'
SS	15	Walter Martínez		(substituted off) 23'
CF	9	Jerry Bengtson
Substitutions:
MF	10	Ramón Núñez		(substituted on) 23'
FW	13	Carlo Costly		(substituted on) 81'
MF	8	Wilson Palacios		(substituted on) 90+3'
Manager:
(Colombia) Luis Fernando Suárez

Assistant referees:
Daniel Williamson (Panama)
William Torres (El Salvador)
Fourth official:
Jair Marrufo (United States)

=== Mexico vs Guatemala ===
June 18, 2011
20:00

Mexico	2–1	Guatemala
De Nigris 48'; J. Hernández 66'	Report	Ruiz 5'

New Meadowlands Stadium, East Rutherford
Attendance: 78,807
Referee: Courtney Campbell (Jamaica)

**Mexico**	**Guatemala**

GK	12	Alfredo Talavera
RB	16	Efraín Juárez
CB	4	Rafael Márquez (c)	(yellow card) 86'
CB	15	Héctor Moreno
LB	3	Carlos Salcido
DM	6	Gerardo Torrado
CM	8	Israel Castro		(substituted off) 46'
CM	18	Andrés Guardado
RF	7	Pablo Barrera		(substituted off) 83'
CF	14	Javier Hernández
LF	10	Giovani dos Santos		(substituted off) 78'
Substitutions:
FW	9	Aldo de Nigris		(substituted on) 46'
FW	11	Ángel Reyna		(substituted on) 78'
MF	13	Jesús Zavala		(substituted on) 83'
Manager:
José Manuel de la Torre

GK	1	Ricardo Jerez
CB	6	Gustavo Cabrera
CB	5	Carlos Gallardo
CB	3	Cristian Noriega
RWB	7	Elías Vásquez		(substituted off) 71'
LWB	19	José Javier del Aguila	(yellow card) 72'
DM	24	Jonathan López	(yellow card) 17'
CM	9	Wilfred Velásquez	(yellow card) 55'
CM	16	Marco Pappa
CF	23	Jairo Arreola		(substituted off) 70'
CF	20	Carlos Ruiz (c)
Substitutions:
FW	18	Óscar Isaula		(substituted on) 70'
DF	4	Carlos Castrillo		(substituted on) 71'
Manager:
(Paraguay) Ever Hugo Almeida

Assistant referees:
Ricardo Morgan (Jamaica)
Charles Morgante (United States)
Fourth official:
Joel Aguilar (El Salvador)

=== Jamaica vs United States ===
June 19, 2011
15:00

Jamaica	0–2	United States
	Report	Jones 49'; Dempsey 79'

RFK Stadium, Washington, D.C.
Attendance: 45,424
Referee: Marco Rodríguez (Mexico)

**Jamaica**	**United States**

GK	1	Donovan Ricketts
CB	19	Adrian Reid
CB	6	Jermaine Taylor	(red card) 67'
CB	12	Demar Phillips
DM	4	Shavar Thomas (c)
CM	7	Jason Morrison		(substituted off) 68'
CM	17	Rodolph Austin	(yellow card) 16'
RW	8	Eric Vernan		(substituted off) 63'
LW	11	Dane Richards
CF	9	Ryan Johnson
CF	21	Luton Shelton		(substituted off) 73'
Substitutions:
DF	15	Je-Vaughn Watson		(substituted on) 63'
MF	18	Keammar Daley		(substituted on) 68'
DF	16	Omar Daley		(substituted on) 73'
Manager:
Theodore Whitmore

GK	1	Tim Howard
RB	6	Steve Cherundolo
CB	3	Carlos Bocanegra (c)
CB	21	Clarence Goodson
LB	14	Eric Lichaj
CM	4	Michael Bradley
CM	13	Jermaine Jones	(yellow card) 25'	(substituted off) 75'
RW	22	Alejandro Bedoya		(substituted off) 65'
AM	16	Sacha Kljestan
LW	8	Clint Dempsey
CF	17	Jozy Altidore		(substituted off) 12'
Substitutions:
FW	9	Juan Agudelo		(substituted on) 12'
MF	10	Landon Donovan		(substituted on) 65'
MF	7	Maurice Edu		(substituted on) 75'
Manager:
Bob Bradley

Assistant referees:
José Luis Camargo (Mexico)
Alberto Morín (Mexico)
Fourth official:
Walter López (Guatemala)

=== Panama vs El Salvador ===
June 19, 2011
18:00

Panama	1–1 (a.e.t.)	El Salvador
Tejada 90'	Report	Zelaya 78' (pen.)
Penalties
Barahona (penalty scored); Rentería (penalty scored); Godoy (penalty scored); A. Henríquez (penalty scored); Tejada (penalty scored)	5–3	(penalty missed) D. Alas; (penalty scored) Romero; (penalty scored) Zelaya; (penalty scored) Flores

RFK Stadium, Washington, D.C.
Attendance: 45,424
Referee: Wálter Quesada (Costa Rica)

**Panama**	**El Salvador**

GK	1	Jaime Penedo
RB	13	Adolfo Machado
CB	5	Román Torres	(yellow card) 77'
CB	23	Felipe Baloy (c)	(yellow card) 51'
LB	17	Luis Henríquez		(substituted off) 85'
CM	6	Gabriel Gómez		(substituted off) 80'
CM	21	Amílcar Henríquez	(yellow card) 118'
RW	11	Armando Cooper		(substituted off) 80'
LW	10	Nelson Barahona
CF	7	Blas Pérez	(red card) 90'
CF	18	Luis Tejada
Substitutions:
FW	19	Alberto Quintero		(substituted on) 80'
MF	20	Aníbal Godoy		(substituted on) 80'
FW	16	Luis Rentería	(yellow card) 97'	(substituted on) 85'
Manager:
Julio Dely Valdés

GK	1	Miguel Montes
RB	2	Xavier García
CB	23	Luis Anaya	(yellow card) 45' (yellow-red card) 90'
CB	5	Víctor Turcios
LB	4	Steve Purdy
RM	16	Jaime Alas		(substituted off) 86'
CM	10	Eliseo Quintanilla		(substituted off) 68'
CM	14	Dennis Alas
LM	19	Reynaldo Hernández	(yellow card) 41'	(substituted off) 46'
CF	9	Rudis Corrales
CF	11	Rodolfo Zelaya
Substitutions:
MF	8	Osael Romero	(yellow card) 81'	(substituted on) 46'
MF	12	Arturo Alvarez		(substituted on) 68'
MF	20	Andrés Flores		(substituted on) 86'
Manager:
(Uruguay) Rubén Israel

Assistant referees:
Leonel Leal (Costa Rica)
Óscar Velásquez (Honduras)
Fourth official:
David Gantar (Canada)

== Semifinals ==
=== United States vs Panama ===
June 22, 2011
19:00 (18:00 UTC−5)

United States	1–0	Panama
Dempsey 76'	Report

Reliant Stadium, Houston
Attendance: 70,627
Referee: Enrico Wijngaarde (Suriname)

**United States**	**Panama**

GK	1	Tim Howard
RB	6	Steve Cherundolo
CB	21	Clarence Goodson
CB	3	Carlos Bocanegra (c)	(yellow card) 68'
LB	14	Eric Lichaj
CM	4	Michael Bradley
CM	13	Jermaine Jones
RW	22	Alejandro Bedoya
AM	16	Sacha Kljestan		(substituted off) 46'
LW	8	Clint Dempsey
CF	9	Juan Agudelo		(substituted off) 66'
Substitutions:
MF	10	Landon Donovan		(substituted on) 46'
MF	20	Freddy Adu		(substituted on) 66'
Manager:
Bob Bradley

GK	1	Jaime Penedo
RB	13	Adolfo Machado
CB	5	Román Torres
CB	23	Felipe Baloy (c)
LB	17	Luis Henríquez	(yellow card) 36'
CM	6	Gabriel Gómez	(yellow card) 72'	(substituted off) 86'
CM	21	Amílcar Henríquez
RW	11	Armando Cooper	(yellow card) 18'	(substituted off) 71'
LW	10	Nelson Barahona		(substituted off) 86'
CF	19	Alberto Quintero
CF	18	Luis Tejada
Substitutions:
FW	16	Luis Rentería		(substituted on) 71'
MF	8	Gabriel Torres		(substituted on) 86'
MF	20	Aníbal Godoy		(substituted on) 86'
Manager:
Julio Dely Valdés

Assistant referees:
Héctor Vergara (Canada)
Leonel Leal (Costa Rica)
Fourth official:
Dave Gantar (Canada)

=== Honduras vs Mexico ===
June 22, 2011
22:00 (21:00 UTC−5)

Honduras	0–2 (a.e.t.)	Mexico
	Report	De Nigris 93'; J. Hernández 99'

Reliant Stadium, Houston
Attendance: 70,627
Referee: Walter López (Guatemala)

**Honduras**	**Mexico**

GK	18	Noel Valladares (c)
RB	16	Mauricio Sabillón	(yellow card) 73'
CB	2	Osman Chávez	(yellow card) 90'
CB	5	Víctor Bernárdez	(yellow card) 17'	(substituted off) 46'
LB	21	Juan Garcia	(yellow card) 75'
DM	6	Hendry Thomas
CM	19	Javier Portillo	(yellow card) 39'	(substituted off) 61'
CM	17	Roger Espinoza	(yellow card) 109' (yellow-red card) 115'
RW	14	Oscar García
LW	12	Alfredo Mejía
CF	9	Jerry Bengtson		(substituted off) 71'
Substitutions:
DF	4	Johnny Leverón		(substituted on) 46'
MF	10	Ramón Núñez		(substituted on) 61'
FW	13	Carlo Costly		(substituted on) 71'
Manager:
(Colombia) Luis Fernando Suárez

GK	12	Alfredo Talavera
RB	16	Efraín Juárez	(yellow card) 52'
CB	4	Rafael Márquez (c)
CB	15	Héctor Moreno
LB	3	Carlos Salcido		(substituted off) 56'
DM	6	Gerardo Torrado	(yellow card) 37'
CM	8	Israel Castro
CM	18	Andrés Guardado		(substituted off) 53'
RF	7	Pablo Barrera		(substituted off) 102'
CF	14	Javier Hernández
LF	10	Giovani dos Santos
Substitutions:
FW	9	Aldo de Nigris	(yellow card) 94'	(substituted on) 53'
DF	20	Jorge Torres Nilo		(substituted on) 56'
DF	17	Paul Aguilar		(substituted on) 102'
Manager:
José Manuel de la Torre

Assistant referees:
Hermenerito Leal (Guatemala)
Gerson López (Guatemala)
Fourth official:
Joel Aguilar (El Salvador)

== Final ==
June 25, 2011
21:00 (18:00 UTC−7)

United States	2–4	Mexico
Bradley 8'; Donovan 23'	Report	Barrera 29', 49'; Guardado 36'; Dos Santos 76'

Rose Bowl, Pasadena
Attendance: 93,420
Referee: Joel Aguilar (El Salvador)

**United States**	**Mexico**

GK	1	Tim Howard
RB	6	Steve Cherundolo		(substituted off) 11'
CB	3	Carlos Bocanegra (c)
CB	21	Clarence Goodson
LB	14	Eric Lichaj
DM	13	Jermaine Jones	(yellow card) 90'
CM	4	Michael Bradley
CM	22	Alejandro Bedoya		(substituted off) 63'
RW	10	Landon Donovan	(yellow card) 33'
LW	8	Clint Dempsey	(yellow card) 87'
CF	20	Freddy Adu		(substituted off) 86'
Substitutions:
DF	12	Jonathan Bornstein		(substituted on) 11'
FW	9	Juan Agudelo		(substituted on) 63'
MF	16	Sacha Kljestan		(substituted on) 86'
Manager:
Bob Bradley

GK	12	Alfredo Talavera
RB	16	Efraín Juárez
CB	4	Rafael Márquez (c)		(substituted off) 43'
CB	15	Héctor Moreno
LB	3	Carlos Salcido		(substituted off) 28'
DM	6	Gerardo Torrado
CM	8	Israel Castro
CM	18	Andrés Guardado
RW	7	Pablo Barrera		(substituted off) 75'
LW	10	Giovani dos Santos
CF	14	Javier Hernández
Substitutions:
DF	20	Jorge Torres Nilo	(yellow card) 81'	(substituted on) 28'
DF	2	Héctor Reynoso		(substituted on) 43'
MF	13	Jesús Zavala		(substituted on) 75'
Manager:
José Manuel de la Torre

Assistant referees:
Héctor Vergara (Canada)
William Torres (El Salvador)
Fourth official:
Walter López (Guatemala)
