= 2011 CONCACAF Gold Cup disciplinary record =

In the 2011 CONCACAF Gold Cup the main disciplinary action taken against players comes in the form of red and yellow cards.

Any player picking up a red card is expelled from the pitch and automatically banned for his country's next match, whether via a straight red or second yellow. After a straight red card, FIFA will conduct a hearing and may extend this ban beyond one match. If the ban extends beyond the end of the finals (i.e. if a player is sent off in the match in which his team was eliminated), it must be served in the team's next competitive international match(es).

== Disciplinary statistics ==
- Total number of yellow cards: **90**
- Average yellow cards per match: **3.60**
- Total number of red cards: **10**
- Average red cards per match: **0.24**
- First yellow card: Marco Ureña – Costa Rica against Cuba
- First red card: Marvin González – El Salvador against Mexico
- Fastest yellow card from kick off: **2 minutes** – David Cyrus – Grenada against Jamaica
- Fastest yellow card after coming on as substitute: **2 minutes** – Henry Medina – Honduras against Guatemala
- Latest yellow card in a match without extra time: **90+3 minutes** – Carlos Bocanegra – United States against Panama
- Fastest dismissal from kick off: **4 minutes** – Jean-Luc Lambourde – Guadeloupe against Canada
- Fastest dismissal of a substitute: **5 minutes** – Henry Medina – Honduras against Guatemala
- Latest dismissal in a match without extra time: **90+3 minutes** – Marvin González – El Salvador against Mexico
- Latest dismissal in a match with extra time: **115 minutes** – Roger Espinoza – Honduras against Mexico
- Least time difference between two yellow cards given to the same player: **5 minutes** – Henry Medina – Honduras against Guatemala (Medina was booked in the 74th minute and again in the 79th resulting in his dismissal.)
- Most yellow cards (team): **15** – Honduras
- Most red cards (team): **3** – Guatemala
- Fewest yellow cards (team): **2** – Cuba
- Most yellow cards (player): **2** – (13 players) **Gustavo Cabrera, Henry Medina, Cristian Noriega, Luis Anaya, Roger Espinoza**, Carlos Bocanegra, Andrés Guardado, Jermaine Jones, Victor Bernardez, Alfredo Mejía, Efraín Juárez, Javier Portillo, José Salvatierra, Osman Chávez, Rodolph Austin, Stéphane Auvray, Stéphane Zubar, Terry Dunfield (Names in **bold** indicate 2 yellows in same game.)
- Most red cards (player): **1** – (10 players) Mikael Tacalfred, Jean-Luc Lambourde, Marvin González, Gustavo Cabrera, Henry Medina, Cristian Noriega, Jermaine Taylor, Luis Anaya, Blas Pérez, Roger Espinoza
- Most yellow cards (match): **9** – Honduras vs Mexico
- Most red cards (match): **2** – Panama vs El Salvador
- Fewest yellow cards (match): **0** – Cuba vs Mexico
- Most cards in one match: **9 yellow cards and 1 red card** – Honduras vs Mexico

== Sanctions ==
=== By match ===
Note: In this table the "Yellow" column counts only the first yellow card given to a player in a match. If a player receives a second yellow in the same match this is counted under "Second yellow". This second yellow is not counted as a "Straight Red".

Day	Match	Round	Referee	Total cards	Yellow	Second yellow	Straight red
Day 1	Costa Rica vs Cuba	Group A	(Panama) Roberto Moreno	1	1	0	0
Day 1	Mexico vs El Salvador	Group A	(Suriname) Enrico Wijngaarde	4	3	0	1
Day 2	Jamaica vs Grenada	Group B	(United States) Baldomero Toledo	2	2	0	0
Day 2	Honduras vs Guatemala	Group B	(Mexico) Francisco Chacón	5	3	2	0
Day 3	Panama vs Guadeloupe	Group C	(El Salvador) Marlon Mejía	4	3	0	1
Day 3	United States vs Canada	Group C	(Guatemala) Walter López	2	2	0	0
Day 4	Costa Rica vs El Salvador	Group A	(United States) Jair Marrufo	5	5	0	0
Day 4	Cuba vs Mexico	Group A	(Jamaica) Courtney Campbell	0	0	0	0
Day 5	Jamaica vs Guatemala	Group B	(Costa Rica) Wálter Quesada	6	5	1	0
Day 5	Grenada vs Honduras	Group B	(Canada) David Gantar	1	1	0	0
Day 6	Canada vs Guadeloupe	Group C	(Barbados) Trevor Taylor	4	3	0	1
Day 6	United States vs Panama	Group C	(Mexico) Marco Rodríguez	6	6	0	0
Day 7	El Salvador vs Cuba	Group A	(Trinidad and Tobago) Neal Brizan	3	3	0	0
Day 7	Mexico vs Costa Rica	Group A	(Panama) Roberto Moreno	3	3	0	0
Day 8	Guatemala vs Grenada	Group B	(United States) Baldomero Toledo	2	2	0	0
Day 8	(Slovenia) Honduras vs Jamaica (United States)	Group B	(El Salvador) Joel Aguilar	6	6	0	0
Day 9	Canada vs Panama	Group C	(Guatemala) Walter López	4	4	0	0
Day 9	Guadeloupe vs United States	Group C	(Costa Rica) Jeffrey Solís	3	3	0	0
Day 10	Costa Rica vs Honduras	Quarterfinals	(Panama) Roberto Moreno	6	6	0	0
Day 10	Mexico vs Guatemala	Quarterfinals	(Jamaica) Courtney Campbell	4	4	0	0
Day 11	Jamaica vs United States	Quarterfinals	(Mexico) Marco Rodríguez	3	2	0	1
Day 11	Panama vs El Salvador	Quarterfinals	(Costa Rica) Wálter Quesada	8	6	1	1
Day 12	United States vs Panama	Semifinal	(Suriname) Enrico Wijngaarde	4	4	0	0
Day 12	Honduras vs Mexico	Semifinal	(Guatemala) Walter López	10	9	1	0
Day 12	United States vs Mexico	Final	(El Salvador) Joel Aguilar	4	4	0	0
Total				100	90	5	5

Cards
Referees

=== By referee ===
Referee	Matches	Red	Yellow	Red Cards	PKs awarded
(Panama) Roberto Moreno	3	0	10		
(Suriname) Enrico Wijngaarde	2	1	7	1 straight red	1
(United States) Baldomero Toledo	2	0	4		
(Mexico) Francisco Chacón	1	2	3	2 second yellow	
(El Salvador) Marlon Mejía	1	1	3	1 straight red	
(Guatemala) Walter López	3	1	15	1 second yellow	
(United States) Jair Marrufo	1	0	5		
(Jamaica) Courtney Campbell	2	0	4		
(Costa Rica) Wálter Quesada	2	3	11	1 straight red 2 second yellow	1
(Canada) David Gantar	1	0	1		
(Trinidad and Tobago) Neal Brizan	1	0	3		
(Barbados) Trevor Taylor	1	1	3	1 straight red	1
(Mexico) Marco Antonio Rodríguez	2	1	8	1 straight red	1
(El Salvador) Joel Aguilar	2	0	10		
(Costa Rica) Jeffrey Solís	1	0	3		
Total	25	10	90	5 straight red 5 second yellow	4

=== By team ===
Team	Yellow	Red	Red Cards	Reason	Suspensions
Canada	4	0			T. Dunfield
Costa Rica	6	0			J. Salvatierra
Grenada	3	0			
Guadeloupe	8	2	M. Tacalfred vs Panama straight red card J. Lambourde vs Canada straight red card	violent conduct, tackling	M. Tacalfred vs Canada; J. Lambourde vs United States; S. Auvray; S. Zubar
Guatemala	10	3	G. Cabrera vs Honduras second yellow card H. Medina vs Honduras second yellow card C. Noriega vs Jamaica second yellow card	violent conduct	G. Cabrera vs Jamaica; H. Medina vs Jamaica; C. Noriega vs Grenada
Honduras	15	1	R. Espinoza vs Mexico second yellow card	violent conduct	A. Mejía vs Costa Rica; R. Espinoza
Jamaica	9	1	J. Taylor vs United States straight red card	professional foul	J. Taylor; R. Austin
Mexico	9	0			A. Guardado vs Honduras
Panama	11	1	B. Pérez vs El Salvador straight red card	violent conduct	B. Pérez vs United States
El Salvador	7	2	M. González vs Mexico straight red card L. Anaya vs Panama second yellow card	professional foul	M. González vs Costa Rica; L. Anaya
United States	10	0			C. Bocanegra vs Mexico

Cards
