= Steve Purdy =

Salvadoran footballer (born 1985)

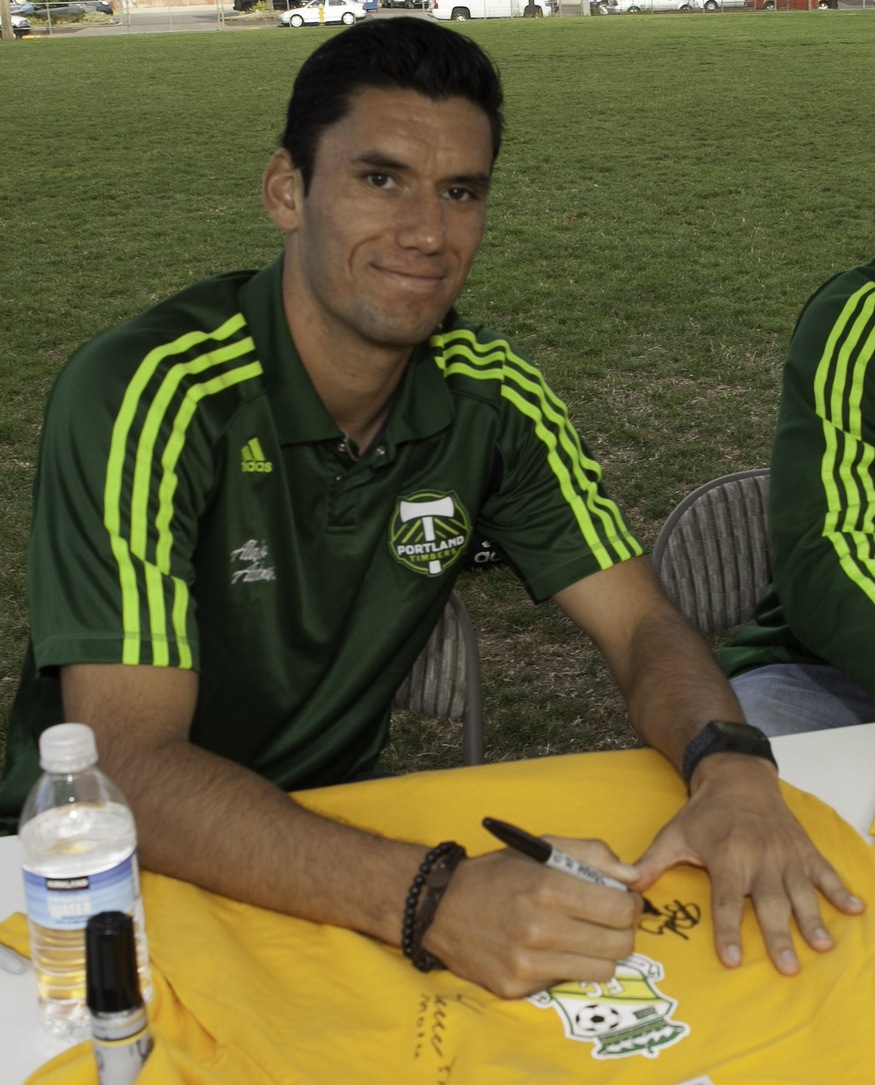
- Purdy signing a shirt at a Portland Timbers event in 2012

Personal information
- Full name: Steven Francis Purdy Ramos
- Date of birth: February 5, 1985 (age 41)
- Place of birth: Bakersfield, California, United States
- Height: 6 ft 4 in (1.93 m)
- Position: Defender

College career
Years	Team	Apps	(Gls)
2003–2006	California Golden Bears		

Senior career*
Years	Team	Apps	(Gls)
2006	San Francisco Seals	0	(0)
2007–2008	1860 Munich II	26	(0)
2009	FC Dallas	5	(0)
2010	Portland Timbers (USL)	24	(0)
2011–2012	Portland Timbers	11	(0)
2013	Chivas USA	8	(0)
2016	Orange County Blues	7	(0)

International career^{‡}
2003	United States U17	5	(0)
2004–2005	United States U20	3	(0)
2007–2008	United States U23	2	(0)
2011–2013	El Salvador	15	(1)
- * Club domestic league appearances and goals as of October 13, 2016 ‡ National team caps and goals as of June 4, 2013

Steven Francis Purdy Ramos (born February 5, 1985) is a former professional footballer who played as a defender.

Born in the United States, he represented El Salvador national team at international level, appearing for them at the CONCACAF Gold Cup in 2011 and 2013.

== Club career ==
=== College ===
Steven Purdy was born in Bakersfield, California to an American father and Salvadoran mother. Purdy attended Archbishop Mitty High School in San Jose, California, played college soccer for the University of California, Berkeley, and with the San Francisco Seals in the USL Premier Development League.

=== Professional ===
He signed his first professional contract with German side 1860 Munich in 2007, and spent two years as a member of the team's reserve squad, but never played a competitive first team game.

He was signed by FC Dallas on January 14, 2009 Purdy made his Major League Soccer career debut and first start in FC Dallas' season opener on March 21, 2009, against the Chicago Fire in a 3–1 home loss. Purdy was waived by Dallas on September 11, 2009, in a move that freed up the cap space for them to sign Heath Pearce. Dallas re-signed Purdy a few days later.

On April 2, 2010, the Portland Timbers announced the signing of Purdy for the 2010 season. Purdy was a key player for Portland in his first year at the club. He appeared in 24 league matches and was a key figure in helping the club concede the second fewest goals in the league. On January 26, 2011, Purdy was signed by Portland Timbers to compete in the club's first season in Major League Soccer. He was a part of the team for its first two seasons in the league. At the end of the 2012 season, the Timbers declined to keep him, thus releasing him on December 3, 2012.

After training with the club for several weeks, Purdy signed with Chivas USA on February 14, 2013. In a game against the San Jose Earthquakes, he received several facial fractures after an elbow by Steven Lenhart. This led to Purdy being sidelined for the rest of the season. After the season, he was waived.

== International career ==
=== United States ===
Purdy represented the United States at various levels, Under-18, Under-20 and Under-23. In 2004, he helped the United States Under-20s to a third-place finish in the Busan (Korea) Four-Nations International Tournament. During the 2007 season, he was called to his first senior U.S. National Team camp for a match against Switzerland on Oct. 17 and was available for selection but did not appear in the match.

=== El Salvador ===
During an interview with a North American blog released on July 19, 2010, Steve expressed his desire to play for the El Salvador national team, and hopes to be part of the team for the 2014 World Cup qualifiers. Former national team coach Carlos de los Cobos expressed interest in having Purdy — who is of Salvadoran descent — play with the El Salvador national football team.

On March 17, 2011, Purdy was selected by El Salvador in a squad for two friendlies against Jamaica and Cuba. However, El Salvador did not give Portland 15 days notice as required by FIFA and the Timbers chose not to release him.

On May 11, 2011, Purdy received his Salvadoran passport in Los Angeles. Rubén Israel, new head coach of El Salvador, selected Purdy for the 2011 CONCACAF Gold Cup tournament, and he received his first cap when starting for the squad in the quarterfinal match against Panama. Purdy scored his first goal as well as had his first assist for El Salvador in a match against the Cayman Islands at Estadio Cuscatlán on October 11, 2011.

==== International goals ====
#	Date	Venue	Opponent	Score	Result	Competition
1	October 11, 2011	Estadio Cuscatlán, San Salvador, El Salvador	Cayman Islands	2 – 0	4 – 0	World Cup qualification
