= Edwin González (Guatemalan footballer) =

Guatemalan footballer (born 1982)

Edwin González (born 22 February 1982) is a Guatemalan football defender.

He appeared in one match was part of the Guatemala national football team for the 2011 CONCACAF Gold Cup.
