= Christophe Olol =

French footballer (born 1980)

Christophe Olol (born 30 August 1980) is a football goalkeeper from Guadeloupe.

He was part of the Guadeloupe national football team for the 2011 CONCACAF Gold Cup. Olol made his debut for Guadeloupe in a friendly against Guyana on 4 May 2012. He made his other appearance for Guadeloupe in a 2012 Caribbean Cup qualifier against Martinique on 27 October 2012.
