= Fabrice Mercury =

French footballer (born 1981)

Fabrice Mercury (born 6 August 1981) is a football goalkeeper from Guadeloupe.

Mercury played club football for CS Moulien from 2005 to 2014, captaining his side to four local championships.

Mercury was the reserve goalkeeper for the Guadeloupe national football team for the 2007 Caribbean Cup, 2007 and 2011 CONCACAF Gold Cup. He made an appearance in the 2007 Caribbean Cup semi-finals, as Guadeloupe lost 3–1 to Haiti.

== Career statistics ==
=== International ===
Appearances and goals by national team and year
National team	Year	Apps	Goals
Guadeloupe	2002	2	0
Guadeloupe	2003	2	0
Guadeloupe	2004	2	0
Guadeloupe	2005	1	0
Guadeloupe	2006	3	0
Guadeloupe	2007	2	0
Guadeloupe	2008	–	
Guadeloupe	2009	–	
Guadeloupe	2010	1	0
Total		13	0
