= Dagoberto Quesada =

Cuban footballer

Personal information
- Full name: Dagoberto Quesada Beckle
- Date of birth: October 6, 1987 (age 39)
- Place of birth: Camagüey, Cuba
- Position: Forward

Team information
- Current team: Camagüey

Senior career*
Years	Team	Apps	(Gls)
2007–	Camagüey		

International career^{‡}
2010–2011	Cuba	7	(0)
- * Club domestic league appearances and goals ‡ National team caps and goals as of 1 January 2018

Dagoberto Quesada Beckle (born 6 October 1987) is a Cuban football midfielder.

== Club career ==
Born in Camagüey, he plays for provincial team Camagüey.

== International career ==
Quesada made his international debut for Cuba in an October 2010 friendly match against Panama and has earned a total of 7 caps, scoring no goals. He appeared in three matches with the Cuba national football team for the 2011 CONCACAF Gold Cup.

His final international was a June 2011 Gold Cup match against El Salvador.
