= Ulick Lupede =

French footballer (born 1984)

Personal information
- Full name: Ulick Lupede
- Date of birth: June 1, 1984 (age 42)
- Place of birth: Pointe-à-Pitre, France
- Height: 1.83 m (6 ft 0 in)
- Position: Defender

Team information
- Current team: C.O. Saint-Saturnin Arche

Senior career*
| Years | Team | Apps | (Gls) |
| 2004–2005 | Le Mans Union Club 72 | 13 | (0) |
| 2005–2006 | Tours FC | 18 | (0) |
| 2006–2007 | L'Entente SSG | 27 | (0) |
| 2007–2009 | Rodez AF | 4 | (0) |
| 2009–2011 | Associação Naval 1º de Maio | 6 | (0) |
| 2011–2012 | Covilhã | 12 | (0) |
| 2012–2013 | C.O. Saint-Saturnin Arche | 0 | (0) |

International career^{‡}
| 2010– | Guadeloupe | 4 | (0) |
- * Club domestic league appearances and goals as of September 27, 2009 ‡ National team caps and goals as of December 22, 2012

Ulick Lupede (born 1 June 1984) is a French footballer currently under amator contract for French side C.O. Saint-Saturnin Arche.

Lupede previously played for Le Mans Union Club 72 in Ligue 1 and Ligue 2. (Note: Ulick Lupede – French league stats at LFP – also available in French (archived))

Lupede appeared in four 2010 Caribbean Cup matches to help Guadeloupe to a runner's-up finish.

== Bibliography ==
- Ulick Lupede at WorldFootball.net
