= Shawn Martin =

Salvadoran footballer (born 1987)

Personal information
- Full name: Shawn Hasani Martin Henríquez
- Date of birth: February 15, 1987 (age 39)
- Place of birth: Managua, Nicaragua
- Height: 1.84 m (6 ft 0 in)
- Positions: Right wing back; right midfielder

Team information
- Current team: Águila
- Number: 12

Youth career
- 1998–2004: Luis Angel Fírpo

Senior career*
Years	Team	Apps	(Gls)
2005–2011	Águila	90	(18)
2012–2013	Metapan	26	(1)
2016–2017	Metapan	1	(0)

International career^{‡}
2006	El Salvador U20		
2007	El Salvador U23		(2)
2007–2011	El Salvador	31	(4)
- * Club domestic league appearances and goals ‡ National team caps and goals as of August 7, 2010

Shawn Hasani Martin Henríquez (born 15 February 1987) is a former professional footballer who played as a defender. Born in Nicaragua, he represented the El Salvador national team.

== Biography ==
His father, Eustace Martin, played professional baseball during the 1980s. His mother was Judy Henríquez. They both had lived in San Salvador. Due to hardships, his parents moved to San Salvador for a better future where his sister Mahatma Martin and his brother Harry Martin were born. At the age of 2, he moved to Nicaragua due to conflicts in the country at the time and since his aunt Carol Henriquez had lived in Santa Tecla, his aunt helped them out to start a new life. Eustace Martin had gone to the United States but never came back for Shawn's family. When Martin went to school, he practiced baseball but since baseball is not a big sport practiced in El Salvador, soccer began to be his favorite sport. Up to this day, neither he nor his family has returned to El Salvador. After a period of time he acquired Salvadoran citizenship in 2005.

== Club career ==
At the age of 11, he went to C.D. Luis Ángel Firpo soccer academy and spent 6 years in the institution. At the age of only 17, he had his big break with C.D. Águila. He would become the first player since Vladan Vićević to be a naturalized footballer.

== International career ==
Martin officially received his first cap on 13 October 2007 in a friendly match against Costa Rica. This game also saw him mark a goal on his debut, and since then, he has moved on to become a national team regular and participated in the majority of the games in the 2010 World Cup qualifiers.

As of August 2011, he has earned 31 caps, scoring four goals, and he has represented his country in 8 FIFA World Cup qualification matches and played at the 2009 UNCAF Nations Cup as well as at the 2011 CONCACAF Gold Cup.

=== International goals ===
No.	Date	Venue	Opponent	Score	Result	Competition	Ref.
1.	13 October 2007	Estadio Cuscatlán, San Salvador, El Salvador	Costa Rica	2-2	2-2	Friendly	
2.	6 February 2008	Estadio Cuscatlán, San Salvador, El Salvador	Anguilla	1-0	12-0	2010 FIFA World Cup qualification	
3.	6 February 2008	Estadio Cuscatlán, San Salvador, El Salvador	Anguilla	2-0	12-0	2010 FIFA World Cup qualification	
4.	10 September 2008	André Kamperveen Stadion, Paramaribo, Suriname	Suriname	1-0	2-0	2010 FIFA World Cup qualification	
