= Wilfred Velásquez =

Guatemalan footballer

Wilfred Velásquez (born 10 September 1985) is a Guatemalan football midfielder.

He was part of the Guatemala national football team for the 2011 CONCACAF Gold Cup, and played in four matches.
