= Jonathan López (Guatemalan footballer) =

Guatemalan footballer (born 1988)

Personal information
- Full name: Jonathan Winibakcer López Mejicanos
- Date of birth: 10 May 1988 (age 38)
- Place of birth: Guatemala
- Position: Midfielder

Team information
- Current team: Iztapa
- Number: 77

Senior career*
Years	Team	Apps	(Gls)
2009–2012	Marquense	84	(11)
2013–2014	Municipal	29	(0)
2014–2015	Antigua	17	(1)
2015	Santos de Guápiles	0	(0)
2015	Xelajú	8	(1)
2015–2016	Marquense	34	(0)
2016–2017	Malacateco	58	(0)
2018–	Iztapa	37	(3)

International career
2010–	Guatemala	34	(0)
- * Club domestic league appearances and goals

Jonathan López (born 10 May 1988) is a Guatemalan football midfielder who plays for Iztapa.

He appeared in four matches of the Guatemala national football team for the 2011 CONCACAF Gold Cup.
