= Óscar Isaula =

Guatemalan footballer

Personal information
- Full name: Óscar Ovidio Isaula Arguijo
- Date of birth: 9 November 1982 (age 44)
- Place of birth: Tegucigalpa, Honduras
- Height: 1.82 m (5 ft 11 1/2 in)
- Position: Centre forward

Senior career*
Years	Team	Apps	(Gls)
2007	Deportivo Marquense	11	(1)
2007–2008	Malacateco	16	(1)
2008	Aurora	0	(0)
2008–2009	Deportivo Jalapa	11	(1)
2009–2010	Deportivo Zacapa	29	(6)
2010–2011	Malacateco	?	(23)
2011–2012	C.S.D. Municipal	47	(12)
2013	Malacateco	41	(13)
2014	Herida Morales	21	(16)
2015	Antigua GFC	68	(15)
2016–2017	Malacateco	29	(4)
2017–2018	Santa Lucía Cotzumalguapa		
2018	Malacateco	5	(1)
2018	Deportivo Siquinalá	16	(2)
2019	Deportivo Sansare		
2019	Deportivo Catocha		

International career
2011	Guatemala	3	(0)
- * Club domestic league appearances and goals

Óscar Isaula (born 9 November 1982 in Tegucigalpa, Honduras) is a retired Honduran-Guatemalan football forward.

He was part of the Guatemala national football team for the 2011 CONCACAF Gold Cup, and played in two matches.
