= Juan Paredes (footballer, born 1984) =

Guatemalan footballer

Juan José Paredes
Personal information
- Date of birth: November 29, 1984 (age 41)
- Height: 1.76 m (5 ft 9 1/2 in)
- Position: Goalkeeper

Senior career*
Years	Team	Apps	(Gls)
2001-2004	Zacapa	9	(0)
2004-2005	Marquense	9	(0)
2005-2006	Heredia	2	(0)
2006-2009	Suchitepequez	4	(0)
2009	Jalapa	21	(0)
2009–2016	Comunicaciones	275	(1)
2017-2018	Suchitepequez	21	(0)
2018	Guastatoya	26	(0)

International career
2011	Guatemala	7	(0)
- * Club domestic league appearances and goals

Juan José Paredes (born November 29, 1984) is a retired Guatemalan professional footballer who played as a goalkeeper.
