= Francisco Carrazana =

Cuban football midfielder

Personal information
- Full name: Francisco Alexei Carrazana Roque
- Date of birth: 23 December 1985 (age 40)
- Place of birth: Cienfuegos, Cuba
- Height: 1.73 m (5 ft 8 in)
- Position: Midfielder

Senior career*
Years	Team	Apps	(Gls)
2008–2016	Cienfuegos		

International career^{‡}
2008–2011	Cuba	3	(0)
- * Club domestic league appearances and goals ‡ National team caps and goals as of 4 March 2018

Francisco Alexei Carrazana Roque (born 23 December 1985) is a Cuban football midfielder.

== International career ==
He made his international debut for Cuba in a February 2008 friendly match against Guyana and has earned a total of 3 caps, scoring no goals. He made an appearance in one match with the Cuba national football team for the 2011 CONCACAF Gold Cup which proved to be his final international game.
