= Aliannis Urgellés =

Cuban footballer

Personal information
- Full name: Aliannis Urgellés Montoya
- Date of birth: June 25, 1985 (age 41)
- Place of birth: Baracoa, Cuba
- Height: 1.82 m (6 ft 0 in)
- Positions: Rightback; midfielder

Team information
- Current team: Ciego de Ávila

Senior career*
Years	Team	Apps	(Gls)
2005–2014	Guantánamo		
2014–2016	SW Neukölln	46	(44)
2016–2017	Croatia Berlin	26	(14)
2017–	SW Neukölln		

International career^{‡}
2008–2013	Cuba	44	(2)
- * Club domestic league appearances and goals ‡ National team caps and goals as of 1 January 2018

Aliannis Urgellés Montoya (born 25 June 1985) is a Cuban football defender.

== Club career ==
Urgellés played for his provincial team Guantánamo in Cuba before moving to Germany. He was the Cuban league's top goalscorer in 2011.

In 2016 he left SW Neukölln for Croatia Berlin.

== International career ==
He made his international debut for Cuba in a February 2008 friendly match against Guyana and has earned a total of 44 caps, scoring 2 goals. He represented his country in 7 FIFA World Cup qualification matches and appeared in three matches with the Cuba national football team for the 2011 CONCACAF Gold Cup.

His final international was a July 2013 CONCACAF Gold Cup match against Panama.
