= Clive Murray =

Grenadine footballer (born 1990)

Personal information
- Full name: Clive Nolan Murray
- Date of birth: December 5, 1990 (age 35)
- Place of birth: Mt. Rich, St. Patricks; Grenada
- Height: 5 ft 8 in (1.73 m)
- Position: Forward

Team information
- Current team: Roi Et United F.C.
- Number: 34

Youth career
- 2001–2008: Hermitage Government School
- 2008–2010: St. Andrews Anglican Secondary school

Senior career*
Years	Team	Apps	(Gls)
2010–2012	Mt. Rich Football Club		
2012–2017	Roi Et United		
2017–	Paradise		

International career
- Grenada U17
- Grenada U20
- Grenada U23
2010–	Grenada	19	(6)
- * Club domestic league appearances and goals

Clive Nolan Murray (born December 5, 1990) is a footballer from Grenada, who is currently playing for Paradise FC International in the GFA Premier Division.

== Early life ==
He was born in the parish of St. Patricks and was raised in the village of Mt. Rich by his mother Nola Murray. Murray attended the Hermitage Government School after those 7 years he then went on to the St. Andrews Anglican Secondary school representing the school in both cricket and soccer. Since he had a passion for soccer he followed his heart and developed his self mainly in that area. He also represented his school in track and field events at the Intercol Games, which is held annually for the school athletes around Grenada. Besides being a great athlete, he also excelled academically, acquiring all subjects he attempted in the CXC annual exam.

== Career ==
=== Club ===
He started his professional career with the Mt. Rich Football Club, a second division club, where he developed his innate skills and was in the top three in the league in assists and goals, the leading scorer being his teammate Claude 'Suger' James. Getting national attention, he was persuaded to join ASOMS Paradise FC in July 2010, who made his debut in the Premier Division.

On 7 February 2012, he left Grenada and signed in Thailand for Roi Et United F.C. of the Thai Regional League North-East Division.

=== International ===
Murray is a member of the Grenada national football team and was the first player to score for Grenada in a CONCACAF Gold Cup. He did it on 10 June 2011, scoring the opening goal of the game against Honduras at the FIU Stadium in Miami, in the 2011 edition. However his goal only secured the lead for 8 minutes before Honduras scored seven goals of their own giving a final score of 1–7.

=== International goals ===
Scores and results list Grenada's goal tally first.

No.	Date	Venue	Opponent	Score	Result	Competition	Ref.
1.	May 27, 2011	Grenada National Stadium, St. George's, Grenada	Antigua and Barbuda	1–0	2–2	Friendly	
2.	May 27, 2011	Grenada National Stadium, St. George's, Grenada	Antigua and Barbuda	2–0	2–2	Friendly	
3.	June 10, 2011	FIU Stadium, Miami, United States	Honduras	1–0	1–7	2011 CONCACAF Gold Cup	
4.	October 7, 2011	FFB Field, Belmopan, Belize	Belize	4–0	4–1	2014 FIFA World Cup qualification – CONCACAF second round	
