= Dennis Marshall (footballer, born 1985) =

Costa Rican footballer (1985–2011)

- Marshall playing for AaB

Personal information
- Full name: Dennis Amos Marshall Maxwell
- Date of birth: 9 August 1985
- Place of birth: Limón, Costa Rica
- Date of death: 23 June 2011 (aged 25)
- Place of death: San José, Costa Rica
- Position: Left-back

Youth career
- 2006–2007: Limonense

Senior career*
Years	Team	Apps	(Gls)
2007–2008	Puntarenas	30	(3)
2009	→ Herediano (loan)	18	(0)
2009–2011	AaB	22	(2)

International career
2009–2011	Costa Rica	19	(1)
- * Club domestic league appearances and goals

Dennis Amos Marshall Maxwell (9 August 1985 – 23 June 2011) was a Costa Rica professional footballer who played as a left-back. He made 19 appearances for the Costa Rica national team, scoring once.

== Club career ==
Marshall started his career at local side Limonense, before moving to Puntarenas in 2007. He joined Herediano on loan for the 2009 Verano season.

In September 2009 he moved abroad to play for Danish Superliga club AaB.

== International career ==
Marshall made his debut for Costa Rica in a June 2009 FIFA World Cup qualification match against Trinidad and Tobago. Overall, he earned a total of nineteen caps, scoring one goal. He represented his country in four FIFA World Cup qualification matches and played at the 2009 and 2011 CONCACAF Gold Cups.

On 18 June 2011, five days before his death, Marshall played his last match for Costa Rica, a 2011 CONCACAF Gold Cup quarter-final match against Honduras. The match saw Marshall scoring his sole goal for Costa Rica, which he dedicated to his fiancée, who died with him in the accident.

== Personal life ==
Marshall was a son of Dennis Marshall Herron, a former Costa Rica national team player.

== Death ==
On 23 June 2011, Marshall and his girlfriend Meilyn Arianna Masís Castro were traveling on the Braulio Carrillo highway in Costa Rica when they were involved in a fatal car accident 20 kilometres (12 mi) east of San José while on their way to Marshall's parents in Limón. Marshall had scored the only goal for Costa Rica five days earlier in a match against Honduras in the quarterfinals of the 2011 CONCACAF Gold Cup.

His death was marked in several ways in his home country. The president of Costa Rica, Laura Chinchilla, went on national television and expressed her sympathy and a memorial ceremony was held in Estadio Eladio Rosabal Cordero, the stadium of Marshall's former club, CS Herediano.

== Career statistics ==
Scores and results list. Costa Rica's goal tally first.

Goal	Date	Venue	Opponent	Score	Result	Competition
1	18 June 2011	New Meadowlands Stadium, East Rutherford, United States	Honduras	1–1	1–1	2011 CONCACAF Gold Cup
