= Luis Rentería =

Panamanian footballer (1988-2014)

Personal information
- Full name: Luis Gabriel Rentería
- Date of birth: September 13, 1988
- Place of birth: Panama City, Panama
- Date of death: March 6, 2014 (aged 25)
- Place of death: Panama City, Panama
- Height: 1.87 m (6 ft 1 1/2 in)
- Position: Forward

Youth career
- A.D. Orión

Senior career*
Years	Team	Apps	(Gls)
2010–2011	Tauro	36	(23)
2011	→ Cartagena (loan)	19	(2)
2012–2014	Tauro	21	(16)
2012	Bolívar	11	(4)
2013	Tauro	22	(10)
Total		108	(70)

International career^{‡}
2010–2013	Panama	26	(6)
- * Club domestic league appearances and goals as of November 15, 2012 ‡ National team caps and goals as of March 6, 2014

Luis Gabriel Rentería (September 13, 1988 – March 6, 2014) was a Panamanian football forward, who played at the end of his professional career for Tauro in the Liga Panameña de Fútbol.

== Club career ==
Nicknamed Matagatos (Catkiller), Rentería started his career at Orión and played the majority of his career for Tauro but joined Bolivar after one year on loan at Colombian side Real Cartagena where he scored 2 goals in 19 appearances. Renteria was the leading goalscorer in Panama's Primera Division and played his final game in September 2013 against Plaza Amador.

== International career ==
Rentería made his debut for Panama in a September 2010 friendly match against Costa Rica and had earned a total of 26 caps, scoring 6 goals. He has represented his country in 4 FIFA World Cup qualification matches and played at the 2011 Copa Centroamericana as well as at the 2011 CONCACAF Gold Cup.

His final international was a February 2013 FIFA World Cup qualification match against Costa Rica.

== Personal life ==
In October 2013, Rentería was diagnosed with lupus. He died from this disease on March 6, 2014 after being hospitalized for eight months in the Hospital Santo Tomas.

== Honours ==
- Primera Division Champions (2010)
- Primera Division Top goalscorer (2010, 2012)
- CONCACAF Champions League 2010/2011 (participant)
- Copa Centroamericana 2011 (3rd place)
- Gold Cup 2011 (semi-finalist)
