= José del Águila =

Guatemalan footballer

Personal information
- Full name: José Javier del Águila Martínez
- Date of birth: 7 March 1991 (age 35)
- Place of birth: Guatemala City, Guatemala
- Height: 1.78 m (5 ft 10 in)
- Position: Midfielder

Team information
- Current team: U.D. Oliveirense
- Number: 40

Youth career
- ?–2010: Comunicaciones

Senior career*
Years	Team	Apps	(Gls)
2011–2012	Comunicaciones	7	(0)
2012–?	U.D. Oliveirense		

International career^{‡}
2011–	Guatemala	3	(1)
- * Club domestic league appearances and goals as of 18 June 2012 ‡ National team caps and goals as of 31 May 2012

José Javier del Águila Martínez (born 7 March 1991, in Guatemala City) is a Guatemalan football midfielder. He currently plays for Deportivo Coatepeque in Liga Nacional, the Guatemalan Premier Division and for the Guatemala national team.

He represented Guatemala in the 2011 FIFA U-20 World Cup, the 2011 CONCACAF Gold Cup and in CONCACAF World Cup qualifying.
