= Heiner Mora =

Costa Rican footballer (born 1984)

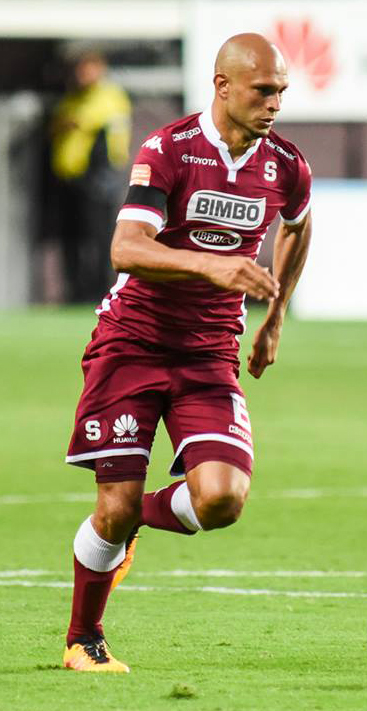

Personal information
- Full name: Heiner Mora Mora
- Date of birth: June 20, 1984 (age 42)
- Place of birth: Guácimo, Costa Rica
- Height: 1.78 m (5 ft 10 in)
- Position: Right back

Youth career
- 1999–2003: Santos de Guápiles

Senior career*
Years	Team	Apps	(Gls)
2003–2007	Santos de Guápiles	96	(3)
2007	Brujas	2	(0)
2008–2009	UCR	28	(1)
2009–2011	Brujas	47	(3)
2011	Santos de Guápiles	11	(0)
2011	→ Saprissa (loan)	12	(0)
2012–2013	Hønefoss	34	(3)
2013–2014	Belén	10	(3)
2014–2019	Saprissa	147	(10)
2019–2020	Pérez Zeledón	19	(1)
2020–2021	Barrio México		

International career
2010–2014	Costa Rica	22	(1)
- * Club domestic league appearances and goals

Heiner Mora Mora (born 20 June 1984) is a Costa Rican former professional footballer who played as a wingback.

== Club career ==
Heiner Mora began his career with Santos de Guápiles. He was a regular starter at rightback for the club before moving to rivals Brujas in 2007. After being seldom used by Brujas, Mora moved to CF Universidad de Costa Rica and recaptured his previous form. In 2009, he returned to Brujas and became an instant starter for the club. The following season, he rejoined Santos de Guápiles and his form drew the attention of top Costa Rican side Saprissa who signed Mora on loan in early 2011. He is rumored to join the Seattle Sounders FC.

Mora has been playing for Norwegian side Hønefoss since 2012. Due to multiple issues, including an inhospitable climate, language barriers, inflexible regulations for immigrants and being separated from his family, he has expressed that he will leave and go back to Costa Rica on May 31, even if it means retiring from professional soccer.

In August 2013, Mora signed a one-year contract with Belén to play in the Costa Rican Primera División. In summer 2014 he returned to Saprissa.

After a spell at Pérez Zeledón, Mora joined Segunda División de Costa Rica club C.D. Barrio México in July 2020.

== International career ==
Mora has played for Costa Rica since 2010. He started all three matches for Costa Rica in the 2011 Copa América and played in the 2011 Gold Cup. Mora missed the 2014 World Cup due to injury and was replaced by David Myrie.

== International goals ==
Scores and results list. Costa Rica's goal tally first.

Goal	Date	Venue	Opponent	Score	Result	Competition
1	5 June 2011	Cowboys Stadium, Arlington, United States	Cuba	4–0	5–0	2011 CONCACAF Gold Cup

== Personal life ==
Born to Dagoberto Mora and Luz Marina Mora, he was born and raised in Guácimo, where his father had a papaya farm.
