= Carlos Francisco =

Cuban footballer (born 1990)

Personal information
- Full name: Carlos Domingo Francisco Serrano
- Date of birth: 22 May 1990 (age 36)
- Place of birth: Santiago de Cuba, Cuba
- Height: 1.80 m (5 ft 11 in)
- Position: Left back

Team information
- Current team: Santiago de Cuba

Senior career*
Years	Team	Apps	(Gls)
2008–	Santiago de Cuba		

International career^{‡}
2008–	Cuba	46	(0)
- * Club domestic league appearances and goals as of 17:56, 22 May 2017 (UTC) ‡ National team caps and goals as of 1 January 2018

Carlos Domingo Francisco Serrano (born 22 May 1990) is a Cuban international footballer who plays for Santiago de Cuba, as a left back.

== Club career ==
Francisco plays his club football for hometown side Santiago de Cuba.

== International career ==
He made his international debut for Cuba in an August 2008 FIFA World Cup qualification match against Trinidad & Tobago and has, as of February 2018, earned a total of 46 caps, scoring no goals. has represented his country in FIFA World Cup qualifying matches.
