= Víctor Turcios =

Salvadoran footballer (born 1988)

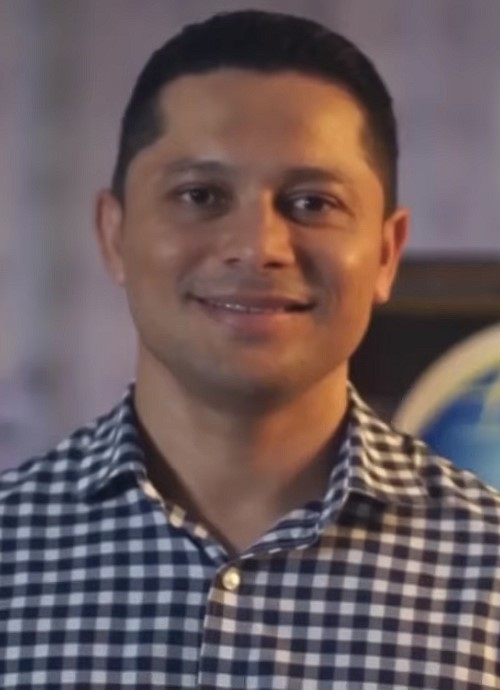

Personal information
- Full name: Víctor Samuel Turcios Pacheco
- Date of birth: April 13, 1988 (age 38)
- Place of birth: Isla Zacatillo, La Unión, El Salvador
- Height: 1.74 m (5 ft 9 in)
- Positions: Defender; defensive midfielder

Senior career*
Years	Team	Apps	(Gls)
2005–2008	Atlético Balboa		
2009–2011	Luis Ángel Firpo	96	(7)
2012–2013	RoPS	38	(1)
2014	Alianza	5	(0)

International career^{‡}
2004–2005	El Salvador U17		
2005–2006	El Salvador U20		
2007	El Salvador U23		
2007–2012	El Salvador	40	(1)
- * Club domestic league appearances and goals as of January 31, 2014 ‡ National team caps and goals as of June 12, 2012

Víctor Samuel Turcios Pacheco (born April 13, 1988 in La Unión) is a retired Salvadoran footballer who last played for Alianza F.C.

== Club career ==
Nicknamed El Tiburón (the Shark), Turcios started his career at Atlético Balboa in 2005 and moved to Luís Ángel Firpo before the 2009 Clausura. In December, 2011 Turcios signed a two-year contract with Águila.

=== Finland ===
On February 16, 2012, it was confirmed Turcios would sign with Ykkönen side RoPS from Finland. He made his league debut in a 2-0 victory over Viikingit. On August 25, he suffered a strained ligament in his right knee that would keep him out for approximately 6 months. He was a key member in helping his team gain promotion to the Veikkausliiga to play in the 2013 season. He and the club mutually terminated his contract in January 2014.

=== Match-fixing ban ===
On September 20, 2013, Turcios was banned for 6 months due to his involvement with match fixing while playing for the El Salvador national football team.

== International career ==
Turcios made his debut for El Salvador in an October 2007 friendly match against Costa Rica and has, as of February 2012, earned a total of 29 caps, scoring 1 goal. He has represented his country in 6 FIFA World Cup qualification matches and played at the 2011 UNCAF Nations Cup, as well as at the 2009 and 2011 CONCACAF Gold Cups.

=== International goals ===
#	Date	Venue	Opponent	Score	Result	Competition
1	11 October 2011	Estadio Cuscatlán, San Salvador, El Salvador	Cayman Islands	1-0	4-0	2014 FIFA World Cup qualification

== Honours and awards ==
=== Club ===
==== RoPS ====
- Ykkönen: 2012
- Suomen Cup: 2013 Finnish Cup
