= Dennis Alas =

Salvadoran football player (born 1985)

Personal information
- Full name: Dennis Jonathan Alas Morales
- Date of birth: 10 January 1985 (age 41)
- Place of birth: San Salvador, El Salvador
- Height: 1.73 m (5 ft 8 in)
- Position: Midfielder

Team information
- Current team: Santa Tecla F.C.

Youth career
- Academia La Chelona

Senior career*
Years	Team	Apps	(Gls)
2001–2008	San Salvador	156	(14)
2008	→ Real Maryland (loan)	14	(3)
2008–2013	Luís Ángel Firpo	164	(44)
2014–2015	Feronikeli		
2015–	Santa Tecla	1	(0)

International career^{‡}
2001–2012	El Salvador	83	(3)
- * Club domestic league appearances and goals as of 28 May 2011 ‡ National team caps and goals as of 1 July 2016

Dennis Jonathan Alas Morales (born 10 January 1985 in San Salvador) is a Salvadoran former footballer. He was banned for life in 2013, for match fixing while playing for the El Salvador national football team.

He is the older brother of El Salvador international Jaime Alas.

== Club career ==
Nicknamed Pitbull, Alas came through the youth ranks at Academia La Chelona and joined San Salvador F.C. in 2001.

After sparking interest with his Gold Cup performance, Alas trained with MLS club CD Chivas USA in contemplation of a potential move there. Nothing came of this and he returned to El Salvador. On 27 December 2007, it was announced that Dennis Alas had signed a one-year contract with USL-2 side Real Maryland F.C. On 14 July 2008, Real Maryland F.C. announced that Dennis Alas’ contract had been terminated by mutual consent with the player. The Salvadoran international played a total of 14 games and scored 3 goals and was also selected to the USL-2 team of the week twice including a USL-2 Player of the Week honor for his two-goal performance in the 3-2 win over Cleveland. The Salvadoran was on loan to Real Maryland from his former club San Salvador F.C.

Due to a clause in his contract he became free when the capital club was relegated to El Salvador’s second division. Alas jumped at the chance to join Salvadoran champions C.D. Luís Ángel Firpo.

In September 2014, thanks to the Football Superleague of Kosovo not being recognised by FIFA, Alas joined KF Feronikeli. His fellow banned Salvadoran teammates Cristian Castillo and José Henríquez joined Zeravani SC in the Kurdish Premier League, a league also not recognised by FIFA, while Ramón Sánchez subsequently joined Zakho FC of the same league.

== International career ==
Alas made his debut for El Salvador in an October 2001 friendly match against Mexico and has, as of August 2011, earned a total of 63 caps, scoring 3 goals. He has represented his country in 7 FIFA World Cup qualification matches and played at several UNCAF Cups as well as at the 2007 and 2009 and 2011 CONCACAF Gold Cups.

On the night of 7 June 2007, he scored the game-winning goal against Trinidad and Tobago to give El Salvador their first win of their 2007 Gold Cup campaign. That night, Alas was named by Univision as the Miller Light Player Of The Match.

On 20 September 2013, Alas was one of 14 Salvadoran players banned for life due to their involvement with match fixing.

=== International goals ===
Scores and results list El Salvador's goal tally first.

#	Date	Venue	Opponent	Score	Result	Competition
1	21 February 2005	Estadio Mateo Flores, Guatemala City, Guatemala	Costa Rica	1–0	1–2	2005 UNCAF Nations Cup
2	7 June 2007	Home Depot Center, Carson, United States	Trinidad and Tobago	2–1	2–1	2007 CONCACAF Gold Cup
3	24 March 2011	Estadio Pedro Marrero, Havana, Cuba	Cuba	1–0	1–0	Friendly
