= Marvin González =

Salvadoran footballer (born 1982)

Personal information
- Full name: Marvin René González Leiva
- Date of birth: April 17, 1982 (age 44)
- Place of birth: El Refugio, El Salvador
- Height: 1.81 m (5 ft 11 in)
- Position: Left-back

Senior career*
Years	Team	Apps	(Gls)
1999–2001	FAS B		
2001–2010	FAS		
2010–2011	Águila	34	(1)
2011–2013	FAS	52	(0)
2013	Santa Tecla FC	4	(0)

International career
1998–2000	El Salvador U17		
2000–2002	El Salvador U20		
2002–2003	El Salvador U23		
2002–2011	El Salvador	83	(1)
- * Club domestic league appearances and goals

Marvin René González Leiva (born April 17, 1982) is a Salvadoran former footballer who played as a left-back.

== Club career ==
Born in El Refugio, González came through the reserves of FAS in 2001 to claim his place in the senior team and to stay in there for almost a decade.

On July 2, 2010, González signed a two-year contract with Águila, starting with the Apertura 2010 season. Marvin González returned to FAS for the Apertura 2011. In 2013, he was released by FAS and later signed with Santa Tecla F.C.

== International career ==
González made his debut for El Salvador in a November 2002 friendly match against the United States and had, as of May 2011, earned a total of 82 caps, scoring 1 goal. He has represented his country in 22 FIFA World Cup qualification matches and played at the 2003, 2005, 2009 UNCAF Nations Cups and 2011 Copa Centroamericana, as well as at the 2003, 2009 and 2011 CONCACAF Gold Cups. González has received a total of 83 caps, making him the second most-capped player for El Salvador after Leonel Cárcamo (84 caps).

=== International goals ===
#	Date	Venue	Opponent	Score	Result	Competition
1.	15 July 2003	Gillette Stadium, Foxborough, United States	Martinique	1–0	1–0	2003 CONCACAF Gold Cup
