= Reynaldo Hernández =

Salvadoran footballer (born 1984)

Personal information
- Full name: Reynaldo Antonio Hernández Villegas
- Date of birth: September 11, 1984 (age 42)
- Place of birth: Concepción Batres, El Salvador
- Height: 1.73 m (5 ft 8 in)
- Position: Defender

Senior career*
Years	Team	Apps	(Gls)
2005	C.D. Guerrero		
2006–2012	Vista Hermosa	46	(0)
2012–2013	Águila		

International career^{‡}
2009–2011	El Salvador	10	(0)
- * Club domestic league appearances and goals ‡ National team caps and goals as of August 7, 2011

Reynaldo Antonio Hernández Villegas (born September 11, 1984, in Concepción Batres) is a Salvadoran former footballer. He was banned for life in 2013, for match-fixing while playing for the El Salvador national football team.

== Club career ==
Hernández started his professional career with club C.D. Guerrero in 2005, joined Primera División de Fútbol de El Salvador (La Primera) club Vista Hermosa in 2006, and moved to La Primera club C.D. Águila in 2012.

== International career ==
Hernández made his debut with the Salvadoran senior team on May 30, 2009, in a match against Jamaica at RFK Stadium, Washington, D.C. Although he played most of the game, he was subbed four minutes before the final whistle. The game ended with a scoreless draw.

As of August 2011, he has earned a total of 10 caps (scoring no goals) and has represented his country at the 2011 CONCACAF Gold Cup.

In August, Castillo was one of 22 players suspended by El Salvador's football federation pending an investigation into match-fixing. On September 20, 2013, Hernández was one of 14 members of the Salvadoran national team banned for life for match fixing.

=== International caps and goals ===
El Salvador's goal tally first.

International appearances and goals
#	Date	Venue	Opponent	Result	Competition	Goals	Minutes played	Extras
1	8 October 2010	Estadio Rommel Fernández, Panama City, Panama	Panama	0–1	Friendly	0	90	
2	12 October 2010	Estadio Carlos Ugalde Álvarez, Ciudad Quesada, Costa Rica	Costa Rica	1–2	Friendly	0	84	(yellow card) 32' (substituted off) 84'
3	14 January 2011	Estadio Rommel Fernández, Panama City, Panama	Nicaragua	2–0	2011 Copa Centroamericana	1	76	71' (substituted off) 76'
4	21 January 2011	Estadio Rommel Fernández, Panama City, Panama	Honduras	0–2	2011 Copa Centroamericana	0	90	
5	29 May 2011	Robertson Stadium, Houston, United States	Honduras	2–2	Friendly	0	30	(substituted on) 60'
6	5 June 2011	Cowboys Stadium, Arlington, Texas	Mexico	0–5	2011 CONCACAF Gold Cup	0	90	
7	9 June 2011	Bank of America Stadium, Charlotte, North Carolina	Costa Rica	1–1	2011 CONCACAF Gold Cup	0	90	
8	12 June 2011	Soldier Field, Chicago, Illinois	Cuba	6–1	2011 CONCACAF Gold Cup	0	90	
9	19 June 2011	Robert F. Kennedy Memorial Stadium, Washington, D.C.	Panama	1–1 (a.e.t.) (3–5 pen.)	2011 CONCACAF Gold Cup	0	86	(yellow card) 41' (substituted off) 86'
10	7 August 2011	Robert F. Kennedy Memorial Stadium, Washington, D.C.	Venezuela	2–1	Friendly	0	90+3	
