= Ramón Sánchez (footballer) =

Salvadoran footballer (born 1982)

Personal information
- Full name: Ramón Alfredo Sánchez Paredes
- Date of birth: May 25, 1982 (age 44)
- Place of birth: San Juan Opico, El Salvador
- Height: 6 ft 0 in (1.83 m)
- Position: Midfielder

Youth career
- 1994–1998: San Juan Opico Escuela de Futbol

Senior career*
Years	Team	Apps	(Gls)
1998–2000	Juventud Independiente		
2000–2002	Arcense		
2002–2007	San Salvador		
2007–2008	Chalatenango		
2008–2009	Alianza	32	(5)
2009–2010	San Jose Earthquakes	13	(2)
2010–2011	Águila	33	(1)
2011–2013	Isidro Metapán	54	(5)
2013	FC Vostok	28	(0)
2014	Zakho FC		

International career^{‡}
1995–1997	El Salvador U15		
1998–1999	El Salvador U17		
2000–2002	El Salvador U20		
2003–2005	El Salvador U23		
2001–2012	El Salvador	74	(2)
- * Club domestic league appearances and goals as of 27 June 27, 2013 ‡ National team caps and goals as of 1 February 2012

Ramón Alfredo Sánchez Paredes (born May 25, 1982, in San Juan Opico) is a Salvadoran football player. He was banned for life in 2013, for match fixing while playing for the El Salvador national football team.

== Career ==
=== Club ===
Sánchez has played professionally with Juventud Independiente, Arcense, San Salvador, Chalatenango and Alianza in the first division in El Salvador. He scored three goals in the 2009 season for Alianza, which was good for second most on the team. In total he has played 227 games in the Salvadoran first division and scored 19 goals.

Sánchez joined the San Jose Earthquakes of Major League Soccer in 2009, and scored two goals in 10 appearances with the team in his debut year. He was later released from the team on June 29, 2010.

In late July 2010, Sánchez signed a one-year contract with Águila, after having spent some time with the San Jose Earthquakes of the Major League Soccer. After his contract expired with Aguila, he made a move to Isidro Metapán for the Apertura 2011.

In February 2013 Sánchez signed with Kazakh team FC Vostok to play in the Kazakhstan Premier League.

Following his life ban, Sánchez signed for Iraqi Premier League side Zakho FC, since the Iraqi Premier League is not being recognised by FIFA. Subsequently, fellow banned teammates José Henríquez and Cristian Castillo joined Duhok SC, also in the Iraqi Premier League.

=== International ===
In 2002 Sánchez won the gold medal with the Salvadoran U22 team in the Juegos Deportivos Centroamericanos, beating Mexico in the final.

Sánchez made his senior debut for El Salvador in a June 2003 friendly match against Honduras and had, before his life ban, earned a total of 74caps, scoring 2 goals. He represented his country in 22 FIFA World Cup qualification matches and played at the 2001 UNCAF Nations Cup as well as at the 2003, 2007, 2009 and 2011 CONCACAF Gold Cups.

On September 20, 2013, Sánchez was one of 14 El Salvador players banned for life due to their involvement with match fixing.

=== International goals ===
#	Date	Venue	Opponent	Score	Result	Competition
1	7 June 2007	Home Depot Center, Carson, United States	Trinidad and Tobago	1–1	2–1	2007 CONCACAF Gold Cup
2	24 January 2009	Estadio Tiburcio Carías Andino, Tegucigalpa, Honduras	Belize	3-0	4-1	2009 UNCAF Nations Cup

== Honours ==
=== Domestic ===
- Salvadoran Primera División: Clausura 2003, Apertura 2011

=== International ===
- 2002 Central American and Caribbean Games
- 2010 FIFA World Cup qualification (CONCACAF)
- 2006 FIFA World Cup qualification
