= Luis Anaya =

Salvadoran footballer (born 1981)

Personal information
- Full name: Luis Alonso Anaya Merino
- Date of birth: May 19, 1981 (age 45)
- Place of birth: San José Guayabal, El Salvador
- Height: 1.81 m (5 ft 11 in)
- Position: Defender

Youth career
- 1992–1995: ADFA Cuscatlán

Senior career*
Years	Team	Apps	(Gls)
1996–1997	C.D. San José		
1997–2005	Platense		
2005	FAS		
2006–2007	Águila	28	(0)
2007–2008	Chalatenango	26	(0)
2008–2010	Alianza	30	(1)
2010–2011	UES		
2011–2014	Águila		

International career
2006–2011	El Salvador	37	(4)
- * Club domestic league appearances and goals

Luis Alonso Anaya Merino (born May 19, 1981) is a Salvadoran former professional football player. He was banned for life in 2013, for match fixing while playing for the El Salvador national team.

== Club career ==
Anaya started his senior career at local side San José, before moving to Salvadoran Second Division side Platense where he stayed for almost eight years.

In May 2005, he made his debut in the Primera División de Fútbol de El Salvador for Salvadoran giants FAS against Águila, whom he joined after winning the 2005 Clausura title with FAS a month after that debut.

In 2008, he signed with Chalatenango, only to move on to Alianza in the same year.

He joined CD UES for the 2010 Apertura season.

== International career ==
Anaya officially received his first cap on October 7, 2006, in a friendly match against Panama.

He scored his first goal for the national team on August 22, 2007, in a friendly match against Honduras.

His second, and most important goal came almost a year later on June 22, 2008, in a FIFA World Cup qualification match against Panama.

His 87th-minute goal led El Salvador to a 3–1 win, and in doing so helped secure the national team a spot in the following round of qualification.

He has earned a total of 35 caps, scoring 2 goals. He has represented his country in eight FIFA World Cup qualification matches and played at the 2007 UNCAF Nations Cup. He also was a non-playing squad member at the 2007 CONCACAF Gold Cup.

He did not play for his country since an October 2008 FIFA World Cup qualification match against Suriname and was only over two years later called up for the 2011 Copa Centroamericana by then coach José Luis Rugamas.

With Rubén Israel as coach, Anaya was called up to take part at the 2011 CONCACAF Gold Cup where he earned four caps.

Anaya received two yellow cards at the semi-finals match against Panama for complaining.

In a friendly match against Venezuela, on 7 August 2011, Anaya was sent off with two yellow cards, because he complained and celebrated in front of the technical area of the Venezuelans.

On September 20, 2013, Anaya was one of 14 Salvadoran players banned for life due to their involvement with match fixing.

== Career statistics ==
#	Date	Venue	Opponent	Score	Result	Competition
1	22 August 2007	Estadio Cuscatlán, San Salvador, El Salvador	Honduras	1–0	2–0	Friendly match
2	22 June 2008	Estadio Cuscatlán, San Salvador, El Salvador	Panama	3–1	3–1	2010 FIFA World Cup qualification
3	6 September 2011	Truman Bodden Stadium, George Town, Cayman Islands	Cayman Islands	1–2	1–4	2014 FIFA World Cup qualification
4	6 September 2011	Truman Bodden Stadium, George Town, Cayman Islands	Cayman Islands	1–3	1–4	2014 FIFA World Cup qualification

== Honours ==
- Primera División de Fútbol de El Salvador: 2

2005 Clausura, 2006 Clausura
