= José Salvatierra =

Costa Rican footballer (born 1989)

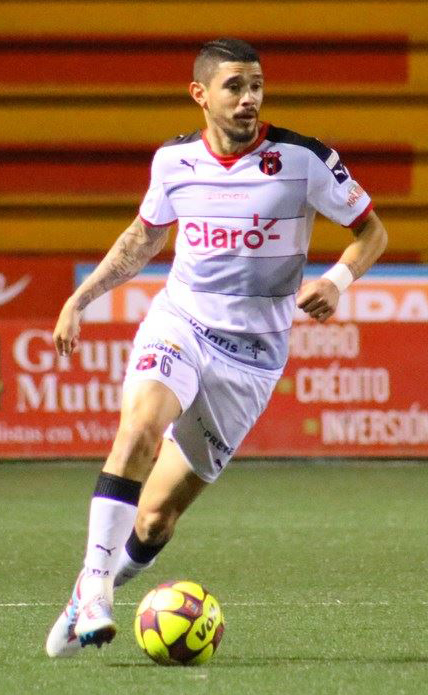
- Salvatierra playing for Alajuelense in 2017

Personal information
- Full name: José Andrés Salvatierra López
- Date of birth: 10 October 1989 (age 37)
- Place of birth: Escazú, Costa Rica
- Height: 1.78 m (5 ft 10 in)
- Position: Right-back

Senior career*
Years	Team	Apps	(Gls)
2010–2021	Alajuelense	266	(11)
2022–2023	Sporting San José	5	(0)

International career^{‡}
2011–2017	Costa Rica	36	(0)
- * Club domestic league appearances and goals as of 2 June 2022 ‡ National team caps and goals as of 11 October 2017

José Andrés Salvatierra López (born 10 October 1989) is a former Costa Rican footballer who played as a right-back.

== Club career ==
Salvatierra made his professional debut on 7 April 2010 against Águilas Guanacastecas.

Salvatierra moved to Major League Soccer side FC Dallas on 16 December 2016.

On 24 January 2017, FC Dallas announced the club and Salvatierra agreed to part ways due to the player failing his physical and medical exams before the MLS Preseason.

== International career ==
Salvatierra made his senior debut for Costa Rica in a June 2011 CONCACAF Gold Cup match against Cuba and earned a total of 26 caps, scoring no goals. He represented his country in 5 FIFA World Cup qualification matches and played at the 2011 CONCACAF Gold Cup, 2011 Copa América and 2013 Copa Centroamericana.

== Honours ==
=== Club ===
Alajuelense

- Liga FPD: Apertura 2010, Clausura 2011, Apertura 2011, Apertura 2012, Apertura 2013, Apertura 2020
- CONCACAF League: 2020

=== International ===
Costa Rica

- Copa Centroamericana: 2013
