= Miguel Montes (footballer, born 1980) =

Salvadoran footballer

Personal information
- Full name: Miguel Ángel Montes Moreno
- Date of birth: February 12, 1980 (age 46)
- Place of birth: Sensuntepeque, El Salvador
- Height: 1.81 m (5 ft 11 in)
- Position: Goalkeeper

Youth career
- 1995–1997: Baygón ADET

Senior career*
Years	Team	Apps	(Gls)
1998–2000	Santa Clara		
2000–2001	ADET		
2001–2005	Alianza	76	(0)
2005–2006	Firpo	20	(0)
2006–2007	Chalatenango	21	(0)
2007–2009	Nejapa	46	(3)
2009–2011	Águila	56	(0)
2011–2012	Isidro Metapán	29	(0)
2012–2013	Alianza	10	(0)

International career^{‡}
2004–2011	El Salvador	43	(0)
- * Club domestic league appearances and goals as of 21 April 2011 ‡ National team caps and goals as of 19 June 2011

Miguel Ángel Montes Moreno (born 12 February 1980) is a Salvadoran former professional footballer who played as a goalkeeper. He was banned for life in 2013, for match fixing while playing for the El Salvador national team.

== Club career ==
On 13 November 2009, Montes was linked with a move to the Primera División de Fútbol de El Salvador (La Primera) club Indios de Ciudad Juárez. He did not sign with the club, as Indios coach José Treviño stated that reinforcements, including Montes, would not be brought in. On 15 April 2011, Miguel Montes left C.D. Águila after 2 years in the club, first being capped in the La Primera's Apertura 2009. He left because the club had not paid him for over a month and a half. On 14 May 2011, Miguel Montes signed for one year at Isidro Metapán. He told a Salvadoran radio station, "I'm happy because I reached an agreement with the people of Isidro Metapán. They were interested like me and came to the concentration, spoke with me and we reached an agreement." In May 2012, he signed for Alianza.

== International career ==
Montes received call ups to the national team in 1998 and in 2001, but did not get his first cap until 24 May 2004, in a friendly match against Haiti. Following the Haiti game, Montes was once again ignored by national team coaches, that is until June 2007 when Mexican coach Carlos de los Cobos called him up to participate in the 2007 CONCACAF Gold Cup. Although he missed out on the opening two game, Montes did play in the team's third and final cup game against the USA. After that, Montes became a mainstay of the national team.

On 20 March 2010, Montes was given a one-year ban and a fine of $250 by the El Salvador Football Federation on account of not wearing the team's sponsored kit. He wore gloves and socks for a different sponsor on numerous occasions, including the Gold Cup in the U.S in 2009. The federation signed a $600,000 deal with the sponsor in 2008, meaning all players were to wear the same sponsored kit to fulfill the sponsorship deal.

After a year of suspension, Montes was called up by then coach José Luis Rugamas in a friendly international against Cuba on 24 March 2011. He entered as substitute for the injured Dagoberto Portillo in the second half.

On September 20, 2013, Montes was one of 14 Salvadoran players banned for life for match fixing.
