= Rubén Israel =

Uruguayan footballer (1955–2021)

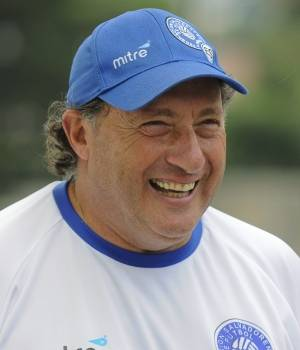

Personal information
- Full name: Rubén Jorge Israel Yelen
- Date of birth: 8 December 1955
- Place of birth: Montevideo, Uruguay
- Date of death: 5 July 2021 (aged 65)
- Height: 1.78 m (5 ft 10 in)

Managerial career
- Years: Team
- 1995: Cerrito
- 1996: Rentistas
- 1997: Progreso
- 1998: Miramar Misiones
- 1999: Huracán Buceo
- 1999: Rampla Juniors
- 2000: Huracán Buceo
- 2002–2003: Rentistas
- 2004: Atenas de San Carlos
- 2007–2008: Libertad
- 2009: Santa Fe
- 2009–2010: Unión Española
- 2011–2012: El Salvador
- 2012–2013: Libertad
- 2013–2014: Atlante
- 2014–2015: Barcelona SC
- 2015–2016: Millonarios
- 2018: LD Alajuelense

Rubén Jorge Israel Yelen (8 December 1955 – 5 July 2021) was a Uruguayan football player and manager.

== Coaching career ==
=== Libertad ===
In the Paraguayan championships, since the start of the Clausura 2007 tournament, Israel coached Club Libertad in 68 matches. His record was 48 wins, 16 draws, and four defeats.

In the 2007 Clausura, Libertad broke a national record for a short tournament with a total of 55 points. In the Apertura 2008, Club Libertad surpassed the record with a total of 57 points.

Also, under coach Israel, Libertad broke a third national record: the annual cumulative, adding up to a total of 101 points in 2008 (he added 95 in 2007).

For the first tri-championship in its history, Club Libertad scored 53 goals, the top scoring team of Apertura 2008, and only allowed 13 goals, becoming the team with the best defence. Under Israel, Libertad qualified for the 2009 Copa Libertadores and 2009 Copa Sudamericana.

The sixth Annual Premios Fox Sports named Rubén Israel as the best football coach and named Club Libertad of Paraguay the best football team.

=== Santa Fe ===
In May 2009 there was speculation that Israel would be the new coach of Atlético Nacional, and negotiations reached an advanced point. However, the emergence of several businessmen in the middle of it meant that Israel desisted from directing the club. Shortly after, Israel was confirmed as the new coach of Santa Fe.

A month later, on 29 June, Israel resigned after receiving death threats if he did not include a player in the line-up. Israel and the player in question later wound up on the same team, Unión Española.

=== Unión Española ===
In October 2009, Israel assumed the leadership of Unión Española, and took them to the 14th place in the standings, improving their performance by getting them qualified for the playoffs, and were eliminated by Deportes La Serena. He quit after a year of technical management of the club, leaving the team in 5th position on league area Pre-Libertadores 2011 and reaching the quarter-finals of Copa Chile.

=== El Salvador ===
"First of all thanks to the executive committee for welcoming me in this country and given me such a huge and so pretty responsibility, as is leading a national team. We have come here with our coaching staff to honor the work, beyond the mistakes and successes. The healthy intention is to work on El Salvador's football as a whole, working with major selections, but have a chronogram of action for youth teams, who are the future of the country."

— Israel, on his first press conference"

On 6 April 2011, the Federación Salvadoreña de Fútbol made official Israel's appointment as El Salvador national team coach, which was led by José Luis Rugamas, and supervisor of minor national teams in the country combined. Israel coached his first match against Honduras on 29 May, which ended in a 2–2 draw, before the beginning of the 2011 CONCACAF Gold Cup.

Israel left for Uruguay for personal reasons on 14 April and returned on 25 April.

During a press conference on 28 April, Rubén Israel announced the coaching staff that would coach the pre-Olympic U-23 and national team. The individuals that would form the coaching staff are assistant managers Mauricio Alfaro and José Luis Rugamas, physical trainers Esteban Coppia (Argentina) and Nicolás Dos Santos (Uruguay) and the goalkeeping coach Carlos Cañadas.

On 9 July 2012, it was announced that Rubén Israel resigned from his duties as coach of El Salvador national team.

=== Atlante ===
On 4 September 2013, he was appointed manager of Atlante.

=== Millonarios ===
In 2015, Israel arrived to coach Millonarios. Israel had a great first championship in the Torneo Apertura 2016. Millonario qualified for the final of the all around.

=== Alajuelense ===
In mid-December 2017 it was reported Israel was to become coach of Costan Rican club Liga Deportiva Alajuelense. On 30 December, he left the country claiming a "health problem". On 6 January 2018, Alajuelense confirmed Israel would not return to the club.

== Death ==
Israel died on 5 July 2021, aged 65. The cause of death was not disclosed.

== Honours ==
With Club Libertad, Israel earned Clausura 2007 titles, Absolute Tournament 2007, Apertura 2008, and Clausura 2008, thus achieving tri-championships with the club. Thanks to his performance as coach of Libertad, he was nominated for Best Technical Director at Fox Sports Awards 2008.
