= Roberto Moreno (referee) =

Panamanian football referee

- Full name: Roberto Moreno Salazar
- Born: 3 April 1970 (age 56); Colón, Panama

Domestic
Years	League	Role

International
Years	League	Role
1996–	FIFA listed	Referee

Roberto Moreno (born 3 April 1970) is a Panamanian football referee. He refereed at 2014 FIFA World Cup qualifiers.
