= 2011 CONCACAF Gold Cup =

11th edition of the CONCACAF Gold Cup

Copa de Oro de la CONCACAF 2011 (in Spanish)

Tournament details
- Host country: United States
- Dates: June 5–25
- Teams: 12 (from 1 confederation)
- Venues: 13 (in 13 host cities)

Final positions
- Champions: Mexico (6th title)
- Runners-up: United States

Tournament statistics
- Matches played: 25
- Goals scored: 80 (3.2 per match)
- Attendance: 1,140,602 (45,624 per match)
- Top scorer(s): (Mexico) Javier Hernández (7 goals)
- Best player: (Mexico) Javier Hernández
- Best goalkeeper: (Honduras) Noel Valladares
- Fair play award: Mexico

The 2011 CONCACAF Gold Cup was the 11th edition of the CONCACAF Gold Cup competition, and the 21st CONCACAF regional championship overall in CONCACAF's 50 years of existence. The United States was the host nation.

The competition started on June 5, 2011, at Cowboys Stadium in Arlington, and ended with the final on June 25, 2011, at the Rose Bowl in Pasadena, California, with Mexico beating the United States 4–2.

This competition was the fifth tournament without guests from other confederations. Mexico won their sixth Gold Cup, and ninth CONCACAF Championship overall. It was the third consecutive Gold Cup final and second consecutive win also.

As winner of the tournament, Mexico qualified for the 2013 FIFA Confederations Cup in Brazil as the representative from CONCACAF.

== Venues ==
The set of thirteen venues – the same number as the 2009 Gold Cup – was announced on December 16, 2010. Each stadium hosted a doubleheader, except the Rose Bowl which hosted the final.

Group stage
Arlington	Carson	Detroit	Charlotte	Miami
Cowboys Stadium	The Home Depot Center	Ford Field	Bank of America Stadium	FIU Stadium
Capacity: 80,000	Capacity: 27,000	Capacity: 65,000	Capacity: 73,778	Capacity: 18,000
June 5	June 6	June 7	June 9	June 10
Tampa	Chicago	Harrison	Kansas City	
Raymond James Stadium	Soldier Field	Red Bull Arena	Livestrong Sporting Park	
Capacity: 68,857	Capacity: 61,500	Capacity: 25,189	Capacity: 18,500	
June 11	June 12	June 13	June 14	
Knockout stage
Quarterfinals		Semifinals	Final	
East Rutherford	Washington, D.C.	Houston	Pasadena	
New Meadowlands Stadium	RFK Stadium	Reliant Stadium	Rose Bowl	
Capacity: 82,566	Capacity: 45,596	Capacity: 71,500	Capacity: 91,136	
June 18	June 19	June 22	June 25	
Location of the host cities of the 2011 CONCACAF Gold Cup.

== Teams ==
=== Qualification ===
A total of 12 teams qualified for the tournament. Three berths were allocated to North America, five to Central America, and four to the Caribbean.

Team	Qualification	Appearances	Last appearance 2022	Previous best performance	FIFA Ranking
North American zone
United States	Automatic	11th	2009	Champion (1991, 2002, 2005, 2007)	22
Mexico (TH)	Automatic	11th	2009	Champions (1993, 1996, 1998, 2003, 2009)	28
Canada	Automatic	10th	2009	Champions (2000)	77
Caribbean zone qualified through the 2010 Caribbean Cup
Jamaica	Winners	8th	2009	Third Place (1993)	55
Guadeloupe	Runners-up	3rd	2009	Semifinals (2007)	N/A
Cuba	Third Place	6th	2007	Quarterfinals (2003)	81
Grenada	Fourth Place	2nd	2009	Group stage (2009)	N/A
Central American zone qualified through the 2011 Copa Centroamericana
Honduras	Winners	10th	2009	Runners-up (1991)	43
Costa Rica	Runners-up	10th	2009	Runners-up (2002)	56
Panama	Third Place	5th	2009	Runners-up (2005)	67
El Salvador	Fourth Place	7th	2009	Quarterfinals (2002, 2003)	87
Guatemala	Fifth Place	9th	2007	Fourth Place (1996)	124

=== Squads ===
The 12 national teams involved in the tournament were required to register a squad of 23 players; only players in these squads were eligible to take part in the tournament.

==== Suspension of Mexican players ====
On June 9, 2011, the names of five Mexican players were released announcing Christian Bermúdez, Édgar Dueñas, Guillermo Ochoa, Francisco Javier Rodríguez and Sinha, all tested positive for clenbuterol prior to the start of the 2011 Gold Cup. They were withdrawn from the squad a few days after their June 5 Gold Cup starting match and 5-0 win against El Salvador. Mexican officials said they believed the positive tests were caused by eating meat tainted with the drug. CONCACAF General Secretary Chuck Blazer said a meeting of the confederation's national teams committee, which also serves as the organizing committee of the Gold Cup, was to be convened on June 10 to consider the situation, including possibly allowing Mexico to replace the five players. However, the meeting was postponed to allow for more information to be gathered. The Mexican Football Federation said on June 14 that the "B" samples of those five involving players were negative. The CONCACAF Gold Cup Organizing Committee announced on June 19 that Mexico would be allowed to replace the suspended players. The replacement players were, Luis Ernesto Michel, Héctor Reynoso, Paul Aguilar, Marco Fabián, and Hiram Mier. All players were later acquitted by the Mexican Football Federation and the results were blamed on contamination of meat, with the ingestion of clenbuterol considered non-intentional. However, the World Anti-Doping Agency (WADA) appealed to the Court of Arbitration for Sport to request a ban. On October 12, 2011, WADA withdrew the request after the full file was available for them.

==== El Salvador match fixing ====
On September 20, 2013, the Salvadoran Football Federation banned 14 Salvadoran players for life due to their involvement with match fixing while playing with the El Salvador national team over the previous two years, including 8 players (Dennis Alas, Luis Anaya, Marvin González, Reynaldo Hernández, Miguel Montes, Dagoberto Portillo, Osael Romero, and Ramón Sánchez), from El Salvador's 5–0 loss to Mexico on June 5, 2011 Gold Cup match.

== Group stage ==
All times are U.S. Eastern Daylight Time (UTC−4) (local times in parentheses)

=== Group A ===
Pos	Team	Pld	W	D	L	GF	GA	GD	Pts	Qualification
1	Mexico	3	3	0	0	14	1	+13	9	Advance to knockout stage
2	Costa Rica	3	1	1	1	7	5	+2	4	Advance to knockout stage
3	El Salvador	3	1	1	1	7	7	0	4	Advance to knockout stage
4	Cuba	3	0	0	3	1	16	−15	0	

Source: CONCACAF
June 5, 2011
18:00 (17:00 UTC−5)

Costa Rica	5–0	Cuba
Ureña 7', 46'; Saborío 41'; Mora 47'; Campbell 71'	Report

Cowboys Stadium, Arlington
Attendance: 80,108
Referee: Roberto Moreno (Panama)
June 5, 2011
20:00 (19:00 UTC−5)

Mexico	5–0	El Salvador
Juárez 56'; De Nigris 58'; J. Hernández 60', 67', 90+5' (pen.)	Report

Cowboys Stadium, Arlington
Attendance: 80,108
Referee: Enrico Wijngaarde (Suriname)

June 9, 2011
19:00

Costa Rica	1–1	El Salvador
Brenes 90+5'	Report	Zelaya 45'

Bank of America Stadium, Charlotte
Attendance: 30,530
Referee: Jair Marrufo (United States)
June 9, 2011
21:00

Cuba	0–5	Mexico
	Report	J. Hernández 36', 76'; Dos Santos 63', 68'; De Nigris 65'

Bank of America Stadium, Charlotte
Attendance: 46,012
Referee: Courtney Campbell (Jamaica)

June 12, 2011
18:00 (17:00 UTC−5)

El Salvador	6–1	Cuba
Zelaya 13', 71'; Romero 29'; Blanco 69'; Alvarez 84'; Quintanilla 90+4'	Report	Márquez 83'

Soldier Field, Chicago
Attendance: 62,000
Referee: Neal Brizan (Trinidad and Tobago)
June 12, 2011
20:00 (19:00 UTC−5)

Mexico	4–1	Costa Rica
Márquez 17'; Guardado 19', 26'; Barrera 38'	Report	Ureña 69'

Soldier Field, Chicago
Attendance: 62,000
Referee: Roberto Moreno (Panama)

=== Group B ===
Pos	Team	Pld	W	D	L	GF	GA	GD	Pts	Qualification
1	Jamaica	3	3	0	0	7	0	+7	9	Advance to knockout stage
2	Honduras	3	1	1	1	7	2	+5	4	Advance to knockout stage
3	Guatemala	3	1	1	1	4	2	+2	4	Advance to knockout stage
4	Grenada	3	0	0	3	1	15	−14	0	

Source: CONCACAF
June 6, 2011
21:00 (18:00 UTC−7)

Jamaica	4–0	Grenada
Shelton 21'; Johnson 39'; Phillips 79'; O. Daley 84'	Report

The Home Depot Center, Carson
Attendance: 21,507
Referee: Baldomero Toledo (United States)
June 6, 2011
23:00 (20:00 UTC−7)

Honduras	0–0	Guatemala
	Report

The Home Depot Center, Carson
Attendance: 21,507
Referee: Francisco Chacón (Mexico)

June 10, 2011
19:00

Jamaica	2–0	Guatemala
Phillips 66', 79'	Report

FIU Stadium, Miami
Attendance: 18,057
Referee: Wálter Quesada (Costa Rica)
June 10, 2011
21:00

Grenada	1–7	Honduras
Murray 20'	Report	Bengtson 26', 37'; Costly 28', 67', 71'; W. Martínez 89'; Mejía 90+3'

FIU Stadium, Miami
Attendance: 18,057
Referee: David Gantar (Canada)

June 13, 2011
19:00

Guatemala	4–0	Grenada
Del Águila 16'; Pappa 22'; Ruiz 54'; Gallardo 59'	Report

Red Bull Arena, Harrison
Attendance: 25,000
Referee: Baldomero Toledo (United States)
June 13, 2011
21:00

Honduras	0–1	Jamaica
	Report	Johnson 36'

Red Bull Arena, Harrison
Attendance: 25,000
Referee: Joel Aguilar (El Salvador)

=== Group C ===
Pos	Team	Pld	W	D	L	GF	GA	GD	Pts	Qualification
1	Panama	3	2	1	0	6	4	+2	7	Advance to knockout stage
2	United States	3	2	0	1	4	2	+2	6	Advance to knockout stage
3	Canada	3	1	1	1	2	3	−1	4	
4	Guadeloupe	3	0	0	3	2	5	−3	0	

Source: CONCACAF
June 7, 2011
18:00

Panama	3–2	Guadeloupe
Pérez 29'; Tejada 31'; Gómez 57' (pen.)	Report	Jovial 65', 78'

Ford Field, Detroit
Attendance: 28,209
Referee: Marlon Mejía (El Salvador)
June 7, 2011
20:00

United States	2–0	Canada
Altidore 15'; Dempsey 62'	Report

Ford Field, Detroit
Attendance: 28,209
Referee: Walter López (Guatemala)

June 11, 2011
18:00

Canada	1–0	Guadeloupe
De Rosario 51' (pen.)	Report

Raymond James Stadium, Tampa
Attendance: 27,731
Referee: Trevor Taylor (Barbados)
June 11, 2011
20:00

United States	1–2	Panama
Goodson 68'		Goodson 19' (o.g.); Gómez 36' (pen.)

Raymond James Stadium, Tampa
Attendance: 27,731
Referee: Marco Rodríguez (Mexico)

June 14, 2011
19:00 (18:00 UTC−5)

Canada	1–1	Panama
De Rosario 62' (pen.)	Report	Tejada 90+1'

Livestrong Sporting Park, Kansas City
Attendance: 20,109
Referee: Walter López (Guatemala)
June 14, 2011
21:00 (20:00 UTC−5)

Guadeloupe	0–1	United States
	Report	Altidore 9'

Livestrong Sporting Park, Kansas City
Attendance: 20,109
Referee: Jeffrey Solís (Costa Rica)

=== Ranking of third-placed teams ===
Pos	Grp	Team	Pld	W	D	L	GF	GA	GD	Pts	Qualification
1	B	Guatemala	3	1	1	1	4	2	+2	4	Advance to knockout stage
2	A	El Salvador	3	1	1	1	7	7	0	4	Advance to knockout stage
3	C	Canada	3	1	1	1	2	3	−1	4	

Source: CONCACAF

== Knockout stage ==
=== Bracket ===
Quarterfinals
June 19 – Washington, D.C.
Jamaica	0
United States	2
June 19 – Washington, D.C.
Panama (p)	1 (5)
El Salvador	1 (3)
June 18 – East Rutherford
Costa Rica	1 (2)
Honduras (p)	1 (4)
June 18 – East Rutherford
Mexico	2
Guatemala	1

Semifinals
June 22 – Houston
United States	1
Panama	0
June 22 – Houston
Honduras	0
Mexico (a.e.t.)	2

Final
June 25 – Pasadena
United States	2
Mexico	4

=== Quarterfinals ===
June 18, 2011
17:00

Costa Rica	1–1 (a.e.t.)	Honduras
Marshall 56'	Report	Bengtson 49'
Penalties
Borges (penalty missed); Ruiz (penalty scored); Saborío (penalty missed); Campbell (penalty scored)	2–4	(penalty scored) Costly; (penalty scored) Bernárdez; (penalty scored) Palacios; (penalty scored) Bengtson

New Meadowlands Stadium, East Rutherford
Attendance: 78,807
Referee: Roberto Moreno (Panama)

June 18, 2011
20:00

Mexico	2–1	Guatemala
De Nigris 48'; J. Hernández 66'	Report	Ruiz 5'

New Meadowlands Stadium, East Rutherford
Attendance: 78,807
Referee: Courtney Campbell (Jamaica)

June 19, 2011
15:00

Jamaica	0–2	United States
	Report	Jones 49'; Dempsey 79'

RFK Stadium, Washington, D.C.
Attendance: 45,424
Referee: Marco Rodríguez (Mexico)

June 19, 2011
18:00

Panama	1–1 (a.e.t.)	El Salvador
Tejada 90'	Report	Zelaya 78' (pen.)
Penalties
Barahona (penalty scored); Rentería (penalty scored); Godoy (penalty scored); A. Henríquez (penalty scored); Tejada (penalty scored)	5–3	(penalty missed) D. Alas; (penalty scored) Romero; (penalty scored) Zelaya; (penalty scored) Flores

RFK Stadium, Washington, D.C.
Attendance: 45,424
Referee: Wálter Quesada (Costa Rica)

=== Semifinals ===
June 22, 2011
19:00 (18:00 UTC−5)

United States	1–0	Panama
Dempsey 76'	Report

Reliant Stadium, Houston
Attendance: 70,627
Referee: Enrico Wijngaarde (Suriname)

June 22, 2011
22:00 (21:00 UTC−5)

Honduras	0–2 (a.e.t.)	Mexico
	Report	De Nigris 93'; J. Hernández 99'

Reliant Stadium, Houston
Attendance: 70,627
Referee: Walter López (Guatemala)

=== Final ===
June 25, 2011
21:00 (18:00 UTC−7)

United States	2–4	Mexico
Bradley 8'; Donovan 23'	Report	Barrera 29', 49'; Guardado 36'; Dos Santos 76'

Rose Bowl, Pasadena
Attendance: 93,420
Referee: Joel Aguilar (El Salvador)

== Statistics ==
=== Goalscorers ===
There were 80 goals scored in 25 matches, for an average of 3.2 goals per match.

7 goals

- (Mexico) Javier Hernández

4 goals

- (El Salvador) Rodolfo Zelaya
- (Mexico) Aldo de Nigris

3 goals

- (Costa Rica) Marco Ureña
- (Honduras) Jerry Bengtson
- (Honduras) Carlo Costly
- (Jamaica) Demar Phillips
- (Mexico) Pablo Barrera
- (Mexico) Giovani dos Santos
- (Mexico) Andrés Guardado
- (Panama) Luis Tejada
- (United States) Clint Dempsey

2 goals

- (Canada) Dwayne De Rosario
- (Guadeloupe) Brice Jovial
- (Guatemala) Carlos Ruiz
- (Jamaica) Ryan Johnson
- (Panama) Gabriel Gómez
- (United States) Jozy Altidore

1 goal

- (Costa Rica) Randall Brenes
- (Costa Rica) Joel Campbell
- (Costa Rica) Dennis Marshall
- (Costa Rica) Heiner Mora
- (Costa Rica) Álvaro Saborío
- (Cuba) Yénier Márquez
- (El Salvador) Arturo Álvarez
- (El Salvador) Léster Blanco
- (El Salvador) Eliseo Quintanilla
- (El Salvador) Osael Romero
- (Grenada) Clive Murray
- (Guatemala) José del Águila
- (Guatemala) Carlos Gallardo
- (Guatemala) Marco Pappa
- (Honduras) Walter Martínez
- (Honduras) Alfredo Mejía
- (Jamaica) Omar Daley
- (Jamaica) Luton Shelton
- (Mexico) Efraín Juárez
- (Mexico) Rafael Márquez
- (Panama) Blas Pérez
- (United States) Michael Bradley
- (United States) Landon Donovan
- (United States) Clarence Goodson
- (United States) Jermaine Jones

1 own goal

- (United States) Clarence Goodson (against Panama)

=== Awards ===
The following Gold Cup awards were given at the conclusion of the tournament: the Golden Boot (top scorer), Golden Ball (best overall player) and Golden Glove (best goalkeeper).

Golden Ball
(Mexico) Javier Hernández
Golden Boot
(Mexico) Javier Hernández
7 goals
Golden Glove
(Honduras) Noel Valladares
Fair Play Trophy
Mexico

All-Tournament Team

The All-Tournament Team was selected by the CONCACAF Technical Study Group.

Goalkeeper	Defenders	Midfielders	Forwards
(Honduras) Noel Valladares	(Mexico) Carlos Salcido (Mexico) Rafael Márquez (Mexico) Héctor Moreno (United States) Steve Cherundolo	(Mexico) Pablo Barrera (Mexico) Andrés Guardado (Mexico) Giovani dos Santos (United States) Michael Bradley	(Mexico) Javier Hernández (United States) Clint Dempsey

Best Saves

Rank	Player	Opponent
1	(United States) Tim Howard	Canada
2	(Mexico) Alfredo Talavera	Honduras
3	(Honduras) Noel Valladares	Costa Rica
4	(Honduras) Noel Valladares	Mexico
5	(Costa Rica) Keylor Navas	Mexico
6	(Panama) Jaime Penedo	United States
7	(El Salvador) Miguel Montes	Costa Rica
8	(Costa Rica) Dennis Marshall	Honduras
9	(Guatemala) Ricardo Jérez	Grenada
10	(Guadeloupe) Franck Grandel	United States

Best Goals

Rank	Player	Opponent
1	(Mexico) Giovani dos Santos	United States
2	(United States) Landon Donovan	Mexico
3	(Mexico) Andrés Guardado	Costa Rica
4	(Mexico) Javier Hernández	Guatemala
5	(United States) Jozy Altidore	Guadeloupe
6	(El Salvador) Rodolfo Zelaya	Costa Rica
7	(Costa Rica) Joel Campbell	Cuba
8	(Jamaica) Omar Daley	Grenada
9	(Guatemala) Carlos Ruiz	Mexico
10	(Mexico) Pablo Barrera	United States
