= 2011 Copa Centroamericana squads =

Below are the rosters for the 2011 Copa Centroamericana in Panama, from January 14–23. Every national team's roster consists of 21 players with three goalkeepers included. Statistics of players are accurate as of before the start of the tournament.

== Group A ==
=== Belize ===
Head coach: (Honduras) José de la Paz Herrera

No.	Pos.	Player	Date of birth (age)	Caps	Goals	Club
1	GK	Shane Moody-Orio	7 August 1980 (aged 30)			(National Autonomous Federation of Football of Honduras) C.D. Marathón
12	GK	Glenford Chimilio	29 April 1989 (aged 21)			(Football Federation of Belize) Belize Rising Stars
22	GK	Woodrow West	19 September 1985 (aged 25)			(Football Federation of Belize) Belize Defence Force
2	DF	Luis Mendez	12 December 1990 (aged 20)			(Football Federation of Belize) Hankook Verdes
4	DF	Dalton Eiley	10 December 1983 (aged 27)			(Football Federation of Belize) Toledo Ambassadors
7	DF	Ian Gaynair	26 February 1986 (aged 24)			(Football Federation of Belize) FC Belize
11	DF	Evral Trapp	22 January 1987 (aged 23)			(Football Federation of Belize) Hopkins FC
13	DF	Kent Gabourel Jr.	26 May 1980 (aged 30)			(Football Federation of Belize) San Pedro Sea Dogs
15	DF	Víctor Morales	7 November 1982 (aged 28)			(Football Federation of Belize) San Felipe Barcelona
16	DF	Kareem Haylock	21 May 1984 (aged 26)			(Football Federation of Belize) Griga United
20	DF	Tyrone Pandy	14 January 1986 (aged 25)			(Football Federation of Belize) Belize Defence Force
3	MF	Ryan Simpson	7 September 1985 (aged 25)			(Football Federation of Belize) Benguche United
5	MF	Elroy Kuylen	6 June 1983 (aged 27)			(National Autonomous Federation of Football of Honduras) C.D. Platense
8	MF	Elroy Smith	30 November 1981 (aged 29)			(National Autonomous Federation of Football of Honduras) C.D. Marathón
18	MF	Lisbey Castillo	30 June 1987 (aged 23)			(Football Federation of Belize) Griga United
19	MF	Deris Benavides	5 January 1976 (aged 35)			(Football Federation of Belize) San Felipe Barcelona
6	FW	Evan Mariano	20 January 1988 (aged 23)			(Football Federation of Belize) Belize Defence Force
9	FW	Deon McCaulay	20 September 1987 (aged 23)			(National Autonomous Federation of Football of Honduras) Deportes Savio
10	FW	Orlando Jimenez	18 August 1980 (aged 30)			(Football Federation of Belize) Belize Defence Force
14	FW	Amin August	16 August 1990 (aged 20)			(Football Federation of Belize) Santa Elena FC
17	FW	Daniel Jiménez	14 April 1988 (aged 22)			(Football Federation of Belize) Belize Defence Force

=== El Salvador ===
Head coach: (El Salvador) José Luis Rugamas

No.	Pos.	Player	Date of birth (age)	Caps	Goals	Club
1	GK	Dagoberto Portillo	November 16, 1979 (age 46)	4	0	(Salvadoran Football Federation) Once Municipal
2	DF	Xavier García	June 26, 1990 (age 35)	1	0	(Salvadoran Football Federation) Luis Ángel Firpo
3	DF	Marvin González (captain)	April 17, 1982 (age 43)	72	1	(Salvadoran Football Federation) Águila
4	DF	Mardoqueo Henríquez	May 24, 1987 (age 38)	24	0	(Salvadoran Football Federation) FAS
5	DF	Víctor Turcios	April 13, 1988 (age 37)	10	0	(Salvadoran Football Federation) Luis Ángel Firpo
6	DF	Milton Molina	February 2, 1989 (age 36)	0	0	(Salvadoran Football Federation) Isidro Metapán
7	MF	Gilberto Baires	April 11, 1990 (age 35)	0	0	(Salvadoran Football Federation) Atlético Marte
8	MF	Osael Romero	April 18, 1986 (age 39)	43	8	(Salvadoran Football Federation) Vista Hermosa
9	FW	Rafael Burgos	June 3, 1988 (age 37)	2	1	(Salvadoran Football Federation) UES
10	MF	Edwin Sánchez	February 21, 1990 (age 35)	2	0	(Salvadoran Football Federation) UES
11	MF	Arturo Alvarez	June 28, 1985 (age 40)	8	0	(United States Soccer Federation) Real Salt Lake
12	MF	Herbert Sosa	January 11, 1990 (age 35)	2	0	(Salvadoran Football Federation) Alianza
13	DF	Deris Umanzor	January 7, 1980 (age 45)	35	1	(United States Soccer Federation) Chicago Fire
14	MF	Dennis Alas	January 10, 1985 (age 40)	50	2	(Salvadoran Football Federation) Luis Ángel Firpo
16	MF	Jaime Alas	July 30, 1989 (age 36)	2	0	(Salvadoran Football Federation) Luis Ángel Firpo
17	FW	Léster Blanco	January 17, 1989 (age 36)	4	0	(Salvadoran Football Federation) Isidro Metapán
18	GK	Henry Hernández	January 4, 1985 (age 40)	4	0	(Salvadoran Football Federation) Alianza
19	DF	Reynaldo Hernández	November 11, 1984 (age 41)	3	0	(Salvadoran Football Federation) Vista Hermosa
20	MF	Andrés Flores	August 31, 1990 (age 35)	6	0	(Salvadoran Football Federation) Isidro Metapán
22	GK	Fidel Mondragón	February 24, 1981 (age 44)	0	0	(Salvadoran Football Federation) Isidro Metapán
23	DF	Luis Anaya	May 19, 1981 (age 44)	23	2	(Salvadoran Football Federation) UES

=== Nicaragua ===
Head coach: (Spain) Enrique Llena

No.	Pos.	Player	Date of birth (age)	Caps	Goals	Club
1	GK	Denis Espinoza	25 August 1983 (aged 27)	15	0	(Nicaraguan Football Federation) Deportivo Walter Ferretti
2	DF	Josue Quijano	10 March 1991 (aged 19)	0	0	(Nicaraguan Football Federation) Deportivo Walter Ferretti
3	MF	Elvis Figueroa	18 December 1988 (aged 22)	0	0	(Nicaraguan Football Federation) Managua
4	MF	McPerson Garth	23 March 1992 (aged 18)	0	0	(Nicaraguan Football Federation) Diriangén
5	DF	Erick Téllez	28 November 1989 (aged 21)	1	0	(Nicaraguan Football Federation) Diriangén
6	DF	Manuel Gutiérrez	20 January 1987 (aged 23)	0	0	(Nicaraguan Football Federation) Diriangén
7	MF	Félix Rodríguez	27 April 1984 (aged 26)	1	0	(Nicaraguan Football Federation) Real Estelí
8	MF	Norman Eugarrios	9 January 1987 (aged 24)	1	0	(Nicaraguan Football Federation) Chinandega
9	FW	Wilber Sánchez	20 October 1979 (aged 31)	14	0	(Nicaraguan Football Federation) Real Estelí
10	MF	Juan Barrera	2 May 1989 (aged 21)	8	1	(Nicaraguan Football Federation) Deportivo Walter Ferretti
11	MF	Axel Villanueva	10 August 1989 (aged 21)	1	0	(Nicaraguan Football Federation) Deportivo Walter Ferretti
12	GK	Henry Maradiaga	5 February 1990 (aged 20)	0	0	(Nicaraguan Football Federation) Real Estelí
13	MF	Guillermo Padilla	24 November 1993 (aged 17)	0	0	(Nicaraguan Football Federation) Deportivo Walter Ferretti
14	DF	Milton Bustos	19 April 1982 (aged 28)	8	2	(Nicaraguan Football Federation) Xilotepelt
15	FW	Norfran Lazo	8 September 1990 (aged 20)	0	0	(Nicaraguan Football Federation) Deportivo Walter Ferretti
16	FW	Samuel Wilson	4 April 1983 (aged 27)	13	4	(Nicaraguan Football Federation) Real Estelí
17	DF	Felix Zeledón	24 November 1983 (aged 27)	7	0	(Nicaraguan Football Federation) Chinandega
18	FW	Rudel Calero	20 December 1982 (aged 28)	15	2	(Nicaraguan Football Federation) Real Estelí
19	MF	Raúl Leguías	9 October 1989 (aged 21)	0	0	(Nicaraguan Football Federation) Managua
20	DF	David Solórzano	5 November 1980 (aged 30)	23	1	(Nicaraguan Football Federation) Diriangén
22	GK	Erly Méndez	19 May 1988 (aged 22)	0	0	(Nicaraguan Football Federation) Managua FC

=== Panama ===
Head coach: (Panama) Julio Dely Valdés

No.	Pos.	Player	Date of birth (age)	Caps	Goals	Club
1	GK	Jaime Penedo	26 September 1981 (aged 29)	52	0	(National Football Federation of Guatemala) Municipal
3	DF	Harold Cummings	1 March 1992 (aged 18)	3	0	(Panamanian Football Federation) Árabe Unido
4	DF	Jean Cedeño	7 September 1985 (aged 25)	1	0	(Panamanian Football Federation) Chorrillo
5	DF	Román Torres	20 March 1986 (aged 24)	37	1	(Colombian Football Federation) Atlético Nacional
6	MF	Gabriel Gómez	29 May 1984 (aged 26)	56	3	(Cyprus Football Association) Ermis Aradippou
7	FW	Blas Pérez	13 March 1981 (aged 29)	38	14	(Mexican Football Federation) León
8	MF	Gabriel Torres	31 October 1988 (aged 22)	20	2	(Panamanian Football Federation) San Francisco
9	FW	Edwin Aguilar	7 August 1985 (aged 25)	20	4	(Panamanian Football Federation) Sporting SM
10	MF	Ricardo Buitrago	10 March 1985 (aged 25)	4	0	(Panamanian Football Federation) Plaza Amador
11	FW	Roberto Brown	15 July 1977 (aged 33)	46	15	(Panamanian Football Federation) San Francisco
12	GK	Kevin Melgar	1 January 1993 (aged 18)	0	0	(Panamanian Football Federation) Alianza
13	DF	Adolfo Machado	14 February 1985 (aged 25)	17	1	(National Football Federation of Guatemala) Comunicaciones
14	MF	Aramis Haywood	3 April 1985 (aged 25)	2	1	(Panamanian Football Federation) Plaza Amador
15	MF	Erick Davis	31 March 1991 (aged 19)	3	0	(Panamanian Football Federation) Árabe Unido
16	FW	Luis Rentería	13 September 1988 (aged 22)	5	0	(Panamanian Football Federation) Tauro
17	MF	Marcos Sánchez	23 December 1989 (aged 21)	0	0	(Panamanian Football Federation) Tauro
20	MF	Armando Cooper	26 October 1987 (aged 23)	8	0	(Panamanian Football Federation) Árabe Unido
21	MF	Amílcar Henríquez	2 August 1983 (aged 27)	38	0	(Colombian Football Federation) Atlético Huila
22	FW	Eybir Bonaga	19 May 1986 (aged 24)	4	0	(Panamanian Football Federation) San Francisco
23	DF	Felipe Baloy	24 February 1981 (aged 29)	46	2	(Mexican Football Federation) Santos Laguna
19	GK	Eric Hughes		0	0	(Panamanian Football Federation) San Francisco

== Group B ==
=== Costa Rica ===
Head coach: (Argentina) Ricardo La Volpe

No.	Pos.	Player	Date of birth (age)	Caps	Goals	Club
1	GK	Daniel Cambronero	8 January 1986 (aged 25)	1	0	(Costa Rican Football Federation) UCR
2	DF	Kevin Fajardo	5 September 1989 (aged 21)	0	0	(Costa Rican Football Federation) Santos
3	DF	Darío Delgado	14 December 1985 (aged 25)	7	0	(United States Soccer Federation) Chivas USA
4	DF	Dave Myrie	1 June 1988 (aged 22)	1	0	(Costa Rican Football Federation) Limón
5	MF	Celso Borges	27 May 1988 (aged 22)	25	7	(Norwegian Football Federation) Fredrikstad
6	DF	Heiner Mora	20 June 1984 (aged 26)	3	0	(Costa Rican Football Federation) Brujas
7	FW	Marco Ureña	5 March 1990 (aged 20)	6	0	(Costa Rican Football Federation) Alajuelense
8	MF	David Guzmán	18 February 1990 (aged 20)	5	0	(Costa Rican Football Federation) Saprissa
10	FW	Randall Brenes	13 August 1983 (aged 27)	3	2	(Costa Rican Football Federation) Cartaginés
11	FW	César Elizondo	10 February 1988 (aged 22)	0	0	(Costa Rican Football Federation) Pérez Zeledón
12	MF	Cristian Gamboa	24 October 1989 (aged 21)	4	0	(Norwegian Football Federation) Fredrikstad
14	MF	José Cubero	14 February 1987 (aged 23)	3	0	(Costa Rican Football Federation) Herediano
15	DF	Óscar Duarte	3 June 1989 (aged 21)	1	0	(Costa Rican Football Federation) Saprissa
16	DF	Pedro Leal	31 January 1989 (aged 21)	0	0	(Costa Rican Football Federation) Puntarenas
17	FW	Josué Martínez	25 March 1990 (aged 20)	8	1	(Costa Rican Football Federation) Saprissa
18	GK	Patrick Pemberton	24 April 1982 (aged 28)	2	0	(Costa Rican Football Federation) Alajuelense
19	DF	Roy Miller	24 November 1984 (aged 26)	18	0	(United States Soccer Federation) New York Red Bulls
20	DF	Dennis Marshall	9 August 1985 (aged 25)	8	0	(Danish Football Association) Aalborg BK
22	MF	Allen Guevara	16 April 1989 (aged 21)	0	0	(Costa Rican Football Federation) Alajuelense
21	FW	Víctor Núñez	15 April 1980 (aged 30)	23	5	(Costa Rican Football Federation) Herediano
23	GK	Donny Grant	12 April 1976 (aged 34)	2	0	(Costa Rican Football Federation) San Carlos

=== Guatemala ===
Head coach: (Paraguay) Ever Almeida

No.	Pos.	Player	Date of birth (age)	Caps	Goals	Club
	GK	Luis Molina	4 June 1977 (aged 33)	17	0	(National Football Federation of Guatemala) Marquense
	GK	Christian Álvarez	21 May 1982 (aged 28)	1	0	(National Football Federation of Guatemala) Juventud Retalteca
	GK	Juan Paredes	{{{age}}}	0	0	(National Football Federation of Guatemala) Comunicaciones
	DF	Gustavo Cabrera	13 December 1979 (aged 31)	81	1	(National Football Federation of Guatemala) Municipal
	DF	Yony Flores	16 February 1983 (aged 27)	25	1	(National Football Federation of Guatemala) Municipal
	DF	Henry Medina	16 March 1981 (aged 29)	22	1	(National Football Federation of Guatemala) Suchitepéquez
	DF	Carlos Gallardo	8 April 1984 (aged 26)	21	1	(National Football Federation of Guatemala) Comunicaciones
	DF	Jaime Vides	12 July 1987 (aged 23)	10	0	(National Football Federation of Guatemala) Municipal
	DF	Edwin González	22 February 1982 (aged 28)	6	0	(National Football Federation of Guatemala) Mictlán
	MF	Guillermo Ramírez	26 March 1978 (aged 32)	70	11	(National Football Federation of Guatemala) Municipal
	MF	Carlos Figueroa	19 April 1980 (aged 30)	38	4	(National Football Federation of Guatemala) Xelajú
	MF	Gregory Ruiz	8 March 1981 (aged 29)	8	0	(National Football Federation of Guatemala) Xelajú
	MF	Wilfred Velásquez	10 September 1985 (aged 25)	4	0	(National Football Federation of Guatemala) Suchitepéquez
	MF	Marco Ciani	7 March 1987 (aged 23)	4	0	(National Football Federation of Guatemala) Xelajú
	MF	Jairo Arreola	20 September 1985 (aged 25)	2	0	(National Football Federation of Guatemala) Comunicaciones
	MF	Manuel León	23 September 1987 (aged 23)	1	0	(National Football Federation of Guatemala) USAC
	MF	Ricky Murga		0	0	(National Football Federation of Guatemala) Marquense
	DF	Fredy Iboy		0	0	(National Football Federation of Guatemala) Mictlán
	FW	Carlos Ruiz	15 September 1979 (aged 31)	65	36	(Hellenic Football Federation) Aris FC
	FW	Tránsito Montepeque	16 December 1980 (aged 30)	15	5	(National Football Federation of Guatemala) Comunicaciones
	FW	Mario Castellanos	19 May 1982 (aged 28)	6	2	(National Football Federation of Guatemala) Heredia

Juan Jose Paredes Guzman GK 27/11/1984 C.S.D. Comunicaciones (Guatemala) Riqui Nelson Murga Juarez MF 15/07/1980 Deportivo Marquense (Guatemala) Fredy Omar Iboy Aguilar DF 18/04/1983 Deportivo Mictlan (Guatemala)

=== Honduras ===
Head coach: (Mexico) Juan de Dios Castillo

No.	Pos.	Player	Date of birth (age)	Caps	Goals	Club
1	GK	Ricardo Canales	30 May 1982 (aged 28)	6	0	(National Autonomous Federation of Football of Honduras) Victoria
2	DF	Osman Chávez	29 July 1984 (aged 26)	31	0	(Polish Football Association) Wisła Kraków
3	DF	Mariano Acevedo	9 January 1983 (aged 28)	13	0	(National Autonomous Federation of Football of Honduras) Marathón
4	DF	Johnny Palacios	20 December 1986 (aged 24)	11	0	(National Autonomous Federation of Football of Honduras) Olimpia
5	DF	Erick Norales	11 February 1985 (aged 25)	24	2	(National Autonomous Federation of Football of Honduras) Marathón
6	DF	Johnny Leverón	7 February 1990 (aged 20)	3	2	(National Autonomous Federation of Football of Honduras) Motagua
7	MF	Emil Martínez	10 September 1982 (aged 28)	52	2	(Chinese Football Association) Hangzhou Greentown
8	MF	Jorge Claros	8 January 1986 (aged 25)	21	0	(National Autonomous Federation of Football of Honduras) Motagua
9	FW	Georgie Welcome	9 March 1985 (aged 25)	20	3	(National Autonomous Federation of Football of Honduras) Motagua
10	MF	Ramón Núñez	14 November 1985 (aged 25)	33	3	(The Football Association) Leeds United
11	FW	Luis Ramírez	21 November 1977 (aged 33)	7	1	(Chinese Football Association) Hangzhou Greentown
13	MF	Alfredo Mejía	3 April 1990 (aged 20)	0	0	(National Autonomous Federation of Football of Honduras) Real España
14	MF	Oscar García	4 September 1984 (aged 26)	48	1	(National Autonomous Federation of Football of Honduras) Olimpia
15	FW	Walter Martínez	28 March 1982 (aged 28)	40	10	(Chinese Football Association) Beijing Guoan
16	DF	Mauricio Sabillón	11 November 1978 (aged 32)	28	0	(Chinese Football Association) Hangzhou Greentown
17	DF	Juan García	8 March 1988 (aged 22)	3	0	(National Autonomous Federation of Football of Honduras) Olimpia
18	GK	Noel Valladares	3 May 1977 (aged 33)	81	0	(National Autonomous Federation of Football of Honduras) Olimpia
19	MF	Marvin Chávez	3 November 1983 (aged 27)	19	1	(United States Soccer Federation) FC Dallas
21	MF	Mario Martínez	30 July 1989 (aged 21)	6	0	(National Autonomous Federation of Football of Honduras) Real España
22	GK	José Mendoza	21 July 1989 (aged 21)	0	0	(National Autonomous Federation of Football of Honduras) Platense
23	MF	Alexander López	6 May 1992 (aged 18)	1	0	(National Autonomous Federation of Football of Honduras) Olimpia
