= 2007 U-20 World Cup CONCACAF qualifying tournament squads =

Below are the rosters for the 2007 U-20 World Cup CONCACAF qualifying tournament held in Panama and Mexico from 7 January to 25 February 2007.

== Group A ==
=== Guatemala ===
Coach: (Costa Rica) Rodrigo Kenton

No.	Pos.	Player	Date of birth (age)	Caps	Goals	Club
1	GK	Carlos Reyes	8 September 1987 (aged 19)			(National Football Federation of Guatemala) Antigua
2	DF	Dor Yasur	9 May 1987 (aged 19)			(United States Soccer Federation) American University
3	DF	Ricardo Sandoval	25 April 1987 (aged 19)			(National Football Federation of Guatemala) Sacachispas
4	MF	Cristian Noriega	20 March 1987 (aged 19)			(National Football Federation of Guatemala) Municipal
5	MF	Jean Howell	13 March 1988 (aged 18)			(National Football Federation of Guatemala) Municipal
6	DF	Jaime Vides	12 July 1987 (aged 19)			(National Football Federation of Guatemala) Municipal
7	MF	Julián Priego	23 September 1987 (aged 19)			(National Football Federation of Guatemala) Municipal
8	MF	Marco Ponce	15 November 1987 (aged 19)			(National Football Federation of Guatemala) Municipal
9	FW	Minor López	1 February 1987 (aged 19)			(National Football Federation of Guatemala) Xelajú
10	FW	Marco Ciani	7 March 1987 (aged 19)			(National Football Federation of Guatemala) Comunicaciones
11	FW	Edward Santeliz	18 June 1987 (aged 19)			(National Football Federation of Guatemala) Suchitepéquez
14	DF	Rafael Morales	6 April 1988 (aged 18)			(National Football Federation of Guatemala) Antigua
15	MF	Manuel León	23 September 1987 (aged 19)			(National Football Federation of Guatemala) Municipal
16	FW	Jonathan López	10 May 1988 (aged 18)			(National Football Federation of Guatemala) Malacateco
17	FW	Christian Mena	26 January 1987 (aged 19)			(National Football Federation of Guatemala) Suchitepéquez
18	DF	Allan Secada	6 January 1987 (aged 20)			(National Football Federation of Guatemala) Comunicaciones
19	FW	Abner Trigueros	27 December 1987 (aged 19)			(National Football Federation of Guatemala) Comunicaciones
20	FW	David Aroche	7 July 1990 (aged 16)			(National Football Federation of Guatemala) Municipal
21	DF	Pablo Solórzano	1 March 1988 (aged 18)			(National Football Federation of Guatemala) Jalapa
22	GK	Carlos Rodríguez	2 September 1987 (aged 19)			(National Football Federation of Guatemala) Marquense

=== Haiti ===
Coach: (Haiti) Claudio Frean

No.	Pos.	Player	Date of birth (age)	Caps	Goals	Club
1	GK	Peterson Occénat	3 December 1989 (aged 17)			(Haitian Football Federation) FHF
2	DF	Pascal Scifaite	19 January 1987 (aged 19)			(Haitian Football Federation) FHF
3	DF	Abdias D’Aout	18 June 1988 (aged 18)			(Haitian Football Federation) FHF
4	DF	Symson Exume	4 October 1988 (aged 18)			(Haitian Football Federation) FHF
5	DF	Judelin Aveska	21 October 1987 (aged 19)			(Haitian Football Federation) FHF
6	DF	Junior Natoux	12 August 1988 (aged 18)			(Haitian Football Federation) FHF
7	FW	Etienne Yveson	13 May 1987 (aged 19)			(Haitian Football Federation) FHF
8	FW	Adelt Maddy	12 February 1988 (aged 18)			(Haitian Football Federation) FHF
9	FW	Desroches Samuel	18 October 1987 (aged 19)			(Haitian Football Federation) FHF
10	MF	Brisly Renaud	20 April 1989 (aged 17)			(Haitian Football Federation) FHF
11	MF	Roberts Saintilus	5 January 1987 (aged 20)			(Haitian Football Federation) FHF
14	MF	Peterson Joseph	24 April 1990 (aged 16)			(Haitian Football Federation) FHF
15	MF	Junior Saul	18 January 1988 (aged 18)			(Haitian Football Federation) FHF
16	FW	Sony Norde	27 July 1989 (aged 17)			(Haitian Football Federation) FHF
17	FW	Augustin Walson	20 July 1988 (aged 18)			(Haitian Football Federation) FHF
18	DF	Vaniel Sirin	26 October 1989 (aged 17)			(Haitian Football Federation) FHF
19	MF	Jean Dieulemps	7 February 1987 (aged 19)			(Haitian Football Federation) FHF
22	GK	Andy Collinet	6 January 1987 (aged 20)			(Haitian Football Federation) FHF

=== Panama ===
Coach: (Panama) Julio Dely Valdés

No.	Pos.	Player	Date of birth (age)	Caps	Goals	Club
1	GK	Guillermo Murillo	4 November 1987 (aged 19)			(Panamanian Football Federation) San Francisco
2	DF	Eric Vásquez	8 January 1988 (aged 19)			(Panamanian Football Federation) Chorrillo
3	DF	Luis Ovalle	7 September 1988 (aged 18)			(Panamanian Football Federation) Sporting 89
4	FW	Josué Brown	11 October 1987 (aged 19)			(Panamanian Football Federation) Atlético Veragüense
5	DF	Marvin Mitchell	23 January 1987 (aged 19)			(Panamanian Football Federation) Arabe Unido
6	MF	Francisco Castañeda	23 November 1988 (aged 18)			(Panamanian Football Federation) Tauro
7	MF	Javier González	20 June 1988 (aged 18)			(Panamanian Football Federation) Alianza
8	MF	Luis Jaramillo	25 April 1988 (aged 18)			(Panamanian Football Federation) Chepo
9	FW	Gabriel Torres	31 October 1988 (aged 18)			(Panamanian Football Federation) San Francisco
10	MF	Nelson Barahona	22 November 1987 (aged 19)			(Panamanian Football Federation) Arabe Unido
11	MF	Armando Cooper	26 November 1987 (aged 19)			(Panamanian Football Federation) Arabe Unido
12	GK	Luis Mejía	16 March 1991 (aged 15)			(Panamanian Football Federation) Tauro
13	MF	Pablo González	21 March 1989 (aged 17)			No club
14	DF	Christian Vergara	10 December 1988 (aged 18)			No club
15	DF	Miguel González	15 October 1987 (aged 19)			(Panamanian Football Federation) Atlético Veragüense
16	MF	Fernando Barber	12 March 1987 (aged 19)			No club
17	DF	Antonio Leslie	23 April 1987 (aged 19)			(Panamanian Football Federation) Arabe Unido
18	FW	Davis Wallace	31 July 1988 (aged 18)			(Panamanian Football Federation) Tauro
19	MF	Celso Polo	19 March 1987 (aged 19)			(Panamanian Football Federation) San Francisco
20	MF	Manuel Aparicio	1 December 1987 (aged 19)			No club

=== United States ===
Coach: (United States) Thomas Rongen

No.	Pos.	Player	Date of birth (age)	Caps	Goals	Club
1	GK	Chris Seitz	12 March 1987 (aged 19)			(United States Soccer Federation) University of Maryland
2	DF	Tim Ward	28 February 1987 (aged 19)			(United States Soccer Federation) Columbus Crew
3	MF	Bryan Arguez	13 January 1989 (aged 18)			(United States Soccer Federation) West Kendal Optomists
4	DF	Amaechi Igwe	20 May 1988 (aged 18)			(United States Soccer Federation) Santa Clara Broncos
5	DF	Nathan Sturgis	6 July 1987 (aged 19)			(United States Soccer Federation) Los Angeles Galaxy
6	DF	Quavas Kirk	13 April 1988 (aged 18)			(United States Soccer Federation) Los Angeles Galaxy
7	MF	Danny Szetela	17 June 1987 (aged 19)			(United States Soccer Federation) Columbus Crew
8	MF	Robbie Rogers	12 May 1987 (aged 19)			(Royal Dutch Football Association) Heerenveen
9	FW	Johann Smith	25 April 1987 (aged 19)			(The Football Association) Bolton Wanderers
10	MF	Jonathan Villanueva	30 March 1988 (aged 18)			(United States Soccer Federation) University of Virginia
11	MF	Freddy Adu	2 June 1989 (aged 17)			(United States Soccer Federation) Real Salt Lake
12	FW	Jozy Altidore	6 November 1989 (aged 17)			(United States Soccer Federation) New York Red Bulls
13	DF	Ofori Sarkodie	18 June 1988 (aged 18)			(United States Soccer Federation) Indiana University
14	DF	Anthony Wallace	26 January 1989 (aged 17)			(United States Soccer Federation) Brandon FC
15	FW	Sal Zizzo	3 April 1987 (aged 19)			(United States Soccer Federation) UCLA Bruins
16	DF	Julian Valentin	23 February 1987 (aged 19)			(United States Soccer Federation) Wake Forest Demon Deacons
17	FW	Preston Zimmerman	21 November 1988 (aged 18)			(German Football Association) Hamburger SV
18	GK	Brian Perk	21 July 1989 (aged 17)			(United States Soccer Federation) UCLA Bruins
19	MF	Tony Beltran	11 October 1987 (aged 19)			(United States Soccer Federation) UCLA Bruins
20	FW	Andre Akpan	9 December 1987 (aged 19)			(United States Soccer Federation) Harvard University

== Group B ==
=== Costa Rica ===
Coach: (Costa Rica) Geovanni Alfaro

No.	Pos.	Player	Date of birth (age)	Caps	Goals	Club
1	GK	Alfonso Quesada	15 March 1988 (aged 18)			(Royal Spanish Football Federation) Cádiz
2	DF	Brayan Jiménez	15 March 1988 (aged 18)			(Costa Rican Football Federation) Saprissa
3	DF	Rudy Dawson	8 May 1988 (aged 18)			(Costa Rican Football Federation) Alajuelense
4	DF	Giancarlo González	8 February 1988 (aged 18)			(Costa Rican Football Federation) Alajuelense
5	MF	Esteban Rodríguez	25 January 1988 (aged 18)			(Costa Rican Football Federation) Alajuelense
6	MF	José Cubero	14 February 1987 (aged 19)			(Costa Rican Football Federation) Herediano
7	MF	José Luis Cordero	14 February 1987 (aged 19)			No club
8	MF	Celso Borges	27 May 1988 (aged 18)			(Costa Rican Football Federation) Saprissa
9	FW	César Elizondo	10 February 1988 (aged 18)			(Costa Rican Football Federation) Saprissa
10	MF	Luis Pérez	17 March 1987 (aged 19)			(Costa Rican Football Federation) Pérez Zeledón
11	FW	Jean Carlos Solórzano	8 January 1988 (aged 19)			(Costa Rican Football Federation) Alajuelense
12	FW	Jonathan McDonald	28 October 1987 (aged 19)			No club
13	DF	Enmanuel Esquivel	26 January 1987 (aged 19)			(Costa Rican Football Federation) San Carlos
14	DF	Pablo Herrera	14 February 1987 (aged 19)			(Costa Rican Football Federation) Alajuelense
15	MF	Orlando González	20 January 1988 (aged 18)			(Costa Rican Football Federation) Carmelita
16	DF	Leslie Ramos	25 January 1988 (aged 18)			(Costa Rican Football Federation) Alajuelense
17	DF	David Myrie	1 June 1988 (aged 18)			(Royal Spanish Football Federation) Cádiz
18	GK	Esteban Alvarado	28 April 1989 (aged 17)			(Costa Rican Football Federation) Saprissa
19	FW	Ricardo García	18 February 1988 (aged 18)			(Costa Rican Football Federation) Puntarenas
20	DF	Kendall Waston	1 January 1988 (aged 19)			(Costa Rican Football Federation) Saprissa

=== Jamaica ===
Coach: (Jamaica) Dean Weatherly

No.	Pos.	Player	Date of birth (age)	Caps	Goals	Club
1	GK	Dwayne Miller	14 July 1987 (aged 19)			(Jamaica Football Federation) Harbour View
3	FW	Andre Fagan	16 July 1987 (aged 19)			(Jamaica Football Federation) Fraser
4	MF	Joel Senior	9 December 1987 (aged 19)			(United States Soccer Federation) Howard University
5	MF	Norman Bailey	1 February 1988 (aged 18)			(Jamaica Football Federation) Meadhaven United
7	MF	Ricardo Cousins	7 August 1987 (aged 19)			(Jamaica Football Federation) Portmore United
8	DF	Nicholas Beckett	11 December 1987 (aged 19)			(Jamaica Football Federation) Harbour View
9	DF	Eric Vernan	4 July 1987 (aged 19)			(Jamaica Football Federation) Portmore United
10	MF	James Thomas	20 December 1988 (aged 18)			No club
11	DF	Dawyne Smith	7 March 1988 (aged 18)			(Jamaica Football Federation) Meadhaven United
12	FW	Keammar Daley	18 February 1988 (aged 18)			(Jamaica Football Federation) Jamaica Collage
13	GK	Duwayne Kerr	16 January 1987 (aged 20)			(Jamaica Football Federation) Reno
14	MF	Omar Persad	21 March 1987 (aged 19)			No club
15	DF	Michael Binns	12 August 1988 (aged 18)			(Jamaica Football Federation) Portmore United
16	MF	Edward Campbell	15 October 1988 (aged 18)			(Jamaica Football Federation) Village United
17	DF	Troy Smith	24 April 1987 (aged 19)			(Jamaica Football Federation) Village United
18	FW	Draion McNain	28 November 1988 (aged 18)			(Jamaica Football Federation) Reno
19	MF	Joel Grant	26 August 1987 (aged 19)			(The Football Association) Aldershot Town
20	DF	Montrose Phinn	27 November 1987 (aged 19)			(Jamaica Football Federation) Harbour View
22	FW	Alanzo Adlam	12 March 1989 (aged 17)			(Jamaica Football Federation) Harbour View
23	MF	Andrae Campbell	14 March 1989 (aged 17)			(Jamaica Football Federation) Portmore United

=== Mexico ===
Coach: (Mexico) Jesús Ramírez

No.	Pos.	Player	Date of birth (age)	Caps	Goals	Club
1	GK	Alfonso Blanco	31 July 1987 (aged 19)			(Mexican Football Federation) Pachuca
2	DF	Patricio Araujo	30 January 1988 (aged 18)			(Mexican Football Federation) Guadalajara
3	DF	Efraín Juárez	22 February 1988 (aged 18)			(Royal Spanish Football Federation) Barbate
4	DF	Christian Sánchez	4 April 1989 (aged 17)			(Mexican Football Federation) Atlas
5	DF	Héctor Moreno	7 January 1988 (aged 19)			(Mexican Football Federation) Pumas
6	MF	Omar Esparza	21 May 1988 (aged 18)			(Mexican Football Federation) Guadalajara
7	MF	Jorge Hernández	1 June 1988 (aged 18)			(Royal Spanish Football Federation) Barbate
8	MF	Martín González	11 May 1987 (aged 19)			(Mexican Football Federation) Tecos
9	FW	Carlos Vela	1 March 1989 (aged 17)			(Royal Spanish Football Federation) Salamanca
10	FW	Giovani Dos Santos	11 May 1989 (aged 17)			(Royal Spanish Football Federation) Barcelona
11	MF	Javier Hernández	1 June 1988 (aged 18)			(Mexican Football Federation) Guadalajara
12	GK	Rodolfo Cota	3 July 1987 (aged 19)			(Mexican Football Federation) Indios
13	DF	Osmar Mares	17 June 1987 (aged 19)			(Mexican Football Federation) Santos Laguna
14	DF	Marco Iván Pérez	9 December 1987 (aged 19)			(Mexican Football Federation) Pachuca
15	DF	Alejandro Castro	27 March 1987 (aged 19)			(Mexican Football Federation) Cruz Azul
16	MF	Adrián Aldrete	14 June 1988 (aged 18)			(Mexican Football Federation) Monarcas Morelia
17	FW	José Daniel Guerrero	18 November 1987 (aged 19)			(Mexican Football Federation) Atlante
18	MF	César Villaluz	18 July 1988 (aged 18)			(Mexican Football Federation) Cruz Azul
19	MF	Christian Bermúdez	26 April 1987 (aged 19)			(Mexican Football Federation) Atlante
20	FW	Enrique Esqueda	19 April 1988 (aged 18)			(Mexican Football Federation) América

=== Saint Kitts and Nevis ===
Coach: (Saint Kitts and Nevis) Lester Morris

No.	Pos.	Player	Date of birth (age)	Caps	Goals	Club
1	GK	Alexis Richards	31 October 1987 (aged 19)			(St. Kitts and Nevis Football Association) Garden Hotspurs
2	DF	Patrece Liburd	1 March 1988 (aged 18)			(The Football Association) Nottingham Forest
3	DF	Javin Matthew	30 August 1988 (aged 18)			(St. Kitts and Nevis Football Association) Village Superstars
4	DF	Akil Mason	30 October 1987 (aged 19)			(St. Kitts and Nevis Football Association) Parsons
5	DF	Rovan Wigley	11 February 1988 (aged 18)			(St. Kitts and Nevis Football Association) St. Peters
7	MF	Tiran Hanley	22 March 1988 (aged 18)			(St. Kitts and Nevis Football Association) Washington Archibald HS
8	MF	Kevin Banjamin	18 February 1989 (aged 17)			(St. Kitts and Nevis Football Association) Cayon Rockets
9	DF	Kareem Harris	6 January 1988 (aged 19)			(St. Kitts and Nevis Football Association) St. Peters
10	FW	Aaron Moses-Garvey	6 September 1989 (aged 17)			(The Football Association) Birmingham City
11	MF	Gerard Williams	4 June 1988 (aged 18)			(St. Kitts and Nevis Football Association) Old Road
12	MF	Tyron Amory	25 December 1989 (aged 17)			(The Football Association) Derby County
13	DF	Tishan Hanley	22 August 1990 (aged 16)			(St. Kitts and Nevis Football Association) Watts
14	MF	Kelvin Taylor	13 May 1987 (aged 19)			(St. Kitts and Nevis Football Association) Tabernadle
15	MF	Orlando Mitchum	19 May 1987 (aged 19)			(St. Kitts and Nevis Football Association) Washington Archibald HS
16	DF	Shawn Boothe	25 September 1988 (aged 18)			(The Football Association) Tamworth
17	FW	Matthew Berkeley	3 August 1987 (aged 19)			(Scottish Football Association) Gretna
18	MF	Irandy Byron	25 January 1989 (aged 17)			(St. Kitts and Nevis Football Association) Washington Archibald HS
19	FW	Jolston Wattley	23 December 1988 (aged 18)			No club
22	GK	Kervin Benjamin	18 February 1989 (aged 17)			(St. Kitts and Nevis Football Association) Conaree
26	DF	Mudassa Howe	22 October 1988 (aged 18)			(St. Kitts and Nevis Football Association) Washington Archibald HS
