= 2011 CONCACAF Gold Cup Group B =

Group B of the 2011 CONCACAF Gold Cup was one of three groups of the 2011 CONCACAF Gold Cup. It consisted of Grenada, Guatemala, Honduras and Jamaica. The group's first round of matches were played on June 6, with the final round played on June 13. All six group matches were played at venues in the United States, in Carson, California; Miami, Florida and Harrison, New Jersey.

== Standings ==
Key to colors in group tables
Teams that advanced to the quarterfinals: Group winners; Group runners-up; Best two third-placed teams among all groups

Pos	Team	Pld	W	D	L	GF	GA	GD	Pts	Qualification
1	Jamaica	3	3	0	0	7	0	+7	9	Advance to knockout stage
2	Honduras	3	1	1	1	7	2	+5	4	Advance to knockout stage
3	Guatemala	3	1	1	1	4	2	+2	4	Advance to knockout stage
4	Grenada	3	0	0	3	1	15	−14	0	

Source: CONCACAF

== Matches ==
All times are U.S. Eastern Daylight Time (UTC−4) (local times in parentheses)

=== Jamaica vs Grenada ===
June 6, 2011
21:00 (18:00 UTC−7)

Jamaica	4–0	Grenada
Shelton 21'; Johnson 39'; Phillips 79'; O. Daley 84'	Report

The Home Depot Center, Carson
Attendance: 21,507
Referee: Baldomero Toledo (United States)

Jamaica	Grenada

GK	1	Donovan Ricketts
CB	3	Dicoy Williams	(yellow card) 77'
CB	6	Jermaine Taylor
CB	12	Demar Phillips
DM	4	Shavar Thomas (c)
CM	7	Jason Morrison
CM	17	Rodolph Austin		(substituted off) 69'
RW	8	Eric Vernan
LW	11	Dane Richards		(substituted off) 65'
CF	9	Ryan Johnson
CF	21	Luton Shelton		(substituted off) 79'
Substitutions:
DF	16	Omar Daley		(substituted on) 65'
MF	18	Keammar Daley		(substituted on) 69'
DF	15	Je-Vaughn Watson		(substituted on) 79'
Manager:
Theodore Whitmore

GK	30	Shemel Louison
RB	14	Leon Johnson
CB	11	Anthony Modeste (c)
CB	6	Marc Marshall
LB	2	David Cyrus	(yellow card) 2'
CM	9	Ricky Charles
CM	20	Shane Rennie		(substituted off) 62'
RW	4	Craig Rocastle		(substituted off) 46'
LW	19	Patrick Modeste		(substituted off) 86'
CF	8	Delroy Facey
CF	15	Anthony Straker
Substitutions:
FW	16	Lancaster Joseph		(substituted on) 46'
FW	22	Bradley Bubb		(substituted on) 62'
DF	17	Moron Phillip		(substituted on) 88'
Manager:
(England) Mike Adams

Assistant referees:
Joe Fletcher (Canada)
Héctor Vergara (Canada)
Fourth official:
David Gantar (Canada)

=== Honduras vs Guatemala ===
June 6, 2011
23:00 (20:00 UTC−7)

Honduras	0–0	Guatemala
	Report

The Home Depot Center, Carson
Attendance: 21,507
Referee: Francisco Chacón (Mexico)

Honduras	Guatemala

GK	18	Noel Valladares (c)
RB	16	Mauricio Sabillón
CB	2	Osman Chávez		(substituted off) 87'
CB	5	Víctor Bernárdez
LB	24	Brayan Beckeles
DM	6	Hendry Thomas		(substituted off) 70'
RM	7	Emil Martínez
CM	23	Édder Delgado
LM	14	Boniek García
CF	9	Jerry Bengtson		(substituted off) 70'
CF	13	Carlo Costly	(yellow card) 74'
Substitutions:
MF	10	Ramón Núñez		(substituted on) 70'
FW	15	Walter Martínez		(substituted on) 70'
DF	4	Johnny Leverón		(substituted on) 87'
Manager:
(Colombia) Luis Fernando Suárez

GK	1	Ricardo Jérez
RB	6	Gustavo Cabrera	(yellow card) 50' (yellow-red card) 61'
CB	4	Carlos Castrillo		(substituted off) 72'
CB	5	Carlos Gallardo
LB	3	Cristian Noriega
DM	24	Jonathan López
RM	9	Wilfred Velásquez
CM	10	José Manuel Contreras
LM	16	Marco Pappa		(substituted off) 81'
CF	20	Carlos Ruiz (c)
CF	11	Henry David López		(substituted off) 46'
Substitutions:
FW	23	Jairo Arreola		(substituted on) 46'
DF	2	Henry Medina	(yellow card) 74' (yellow-red card) 79'	(substituted on) 72'
MF	14	Carlos Figueroa		(substituted on) 81'
Manager:
(Paraguay) Ever Almeida

Assistant referees:
Marvin Torrentera (Mexico)
Leonel Leal (Costa Rica)
Fourth official:
Wálter Quesada (Costa Rica)

=== Jamaica vs Guatemala ===
June 10, 2011
19:00

Jamaica	2–0	Guatemala
Phillips 66', 79'	Report

FIU Stadium, Miami
Attendance: 18,057
Referee: Wálter Quesada (Costa Rica)

Jamaica	Guatemala

GK	1	Donovan Ricketts
CB	3	Dicoy Williams		(substituted off) 10'
CB	6	Jermaine Taylor	(yellow card) 69'
CB	12	Demar Phillips
DM	4	Shavar Thomas (c)	(yellow card) 37'
CM	7	Jason Morrison
CM	17	Rodolph Austin	(yellow card) 67'	(substituted off) 84'
RW	8	Eric Vernan
LW	11	Dane Richards
CF	9	Ryan Johnson		(substituted off) 63'
CF	21	Luton Shelton
Substitutions:
DF	19	Adrian Reid		(substituted on) 10'
MF	18	Keammar Daley		(substituted on) 63'
MF	22	Damion Williams		(substituted on) 84'
Manager:
Theodore Whitmore

GK	1	Ricardo Jérez
RB	7	Elías Vásquez
CB	13	Edwin González		(substituted off) 46'
CB	5	Carlos Gallardo
LB	3	Cristian Noriega	(yellow card) 34' (yellow-red card) 70'
DM	24	Jonathan López
RM	9	Wilfred Velásquez
CM	10	José Manuel Contreras	(yellow card) 88'
LM	15	Manuel León		(substituted off) 46'
CF	18	Óscar Isaula
CF	20	Carlos Ruiz (c)
Substitutions:
MF	16	Marco Pappa		(substituted on) 46'
MF	14	Carlos Figueroa		(substituted on) 46'	(substituted off) 53'
DF	4	Carlos Castrillo		(substituted on) 53'
Manager:
(Paraguay) Ever Almeida

Assistant referees:
Leonel Leal (Costa Rica)
William Torres (El Salvador)
Fourth official:
Joel Aguilar (El Salvador)

=== Grenada vs Honduras ===
June 10, 2011
21:00

Grenada	1–7	Honduras
Murray 20'	Report	Bengtson 26', 37'; Costly 28', 67', 71'; W. Martínez 89'; Mejía 90+3'

FIU Stadium, Miami
Attendance: 18,057
Referee: David Gantar (Canada)

Grenada	Honduras

GK	30	Shemel Louison
RB	14	Leon Johnson	(substituted off) 61'
CB	11	Anthony Modeste (c)
CB	3	Shanon Phillip
LB	5	Cassim Langaigne
CM	9	Ricky Charles	(substituted off) 46'
CM	12	Clive Murray
RW	23	Junior Williams
LW	16	Lancaster Joseph	(substituted off) 80'
CF	8	Delroy Facey
CF	15	Anthony Straker
Substitutions:
MF	13	Dwayne Leo	(substituted on) 46'
MF	20	Shane Rennie	(substituted on) 61'
FW	7	Marcus Julien	(substituted on) 80'
Manager:
(England) Mike Adams

GK	18	Noel Valladares (c)
RB	16	Mauricio Sabillón
CB	2	Osman Chávez
CB	5	Víctor Bernárdez
LB	21	Juan García
CM	6	Hendry Thomas		(substituted off) 46'
CM	23	Edder Delgado
RW	14	Boniek García
LW	7	Emil Martínez		(substituted off) 64'
CF	9	Jerry Bengtson		(substituted off) 73'
CF	13	Carlo Costly
Substitutions:
FW	15	Walter Martínez		(substituted on) 46'
MF	10	Ramón Núñez		(substituted on) 64'
MF	12	Alfredo Mejía	(yellow card) 90'	(substituted on) 73'
Manager:
(Colombia) Luis Fernando Suárez

Assistant referees:
Héctor Vergara (Canada)
Joe Fletcher (Canada)
Fourth official:
Francisco Chacón (Mexico)

=== Guatemala vs Grenada ===
June 13, 2011
19:00

Guatemala	4–0	Grenada
Del Águila 16'; Pappa 22'; Ruiz 54'; Gallardo 59'	Report

Red Bull Arena, Harrison
Attendance: 25,000
Referee: Baldomero Toledo (United States)

Guatemala	Grenada

GK	1	Ricardo Jérez
RB	6	Gustavo Cabrera
CB	2	Henry Medina
CB	5	Carlos Gallardo
LB	19	José del Águila
DM	24	Jonathan López
RM	9	Wilfred Velásquez
CM	8	Gonzalo Romero	(substituted off) 84'
LM	16	Marco Pappa	(substituted off) 89'
CF	11	Henry David López	(substituted off) 46'
CF	20	Carlos Ruiz (c)
Substitutions:
FW	23	Jairo Arreola	(substituted on) 46'
FW	17	Dwight Pezzarossi	(substituted on) 84'
MF	15	Manuel León	(substituted on) 89'
Manager:
(Paraguay) Ever Almeida

GK	30	Shemel Louison
RB	14	Leon Johnson
CB	11	Anthony Modeste (c)	(yellow card) 88'
CB	6	Marc Marshall		(substituted off) 65'
LB	17	Moron Phillip
CM	9	Ricky Charles
CM	12	Clive Murray
RW	23	Junior Williams	(yellow card) 29'	(substituted off) 46'
LW	22	Bradley Bubb
CF	8	Delroy Facey		(substituted off) 82'
CF	15	Anthony Straker
Substitutions:
DF	2	David Cyrus		(substituted on) 46'
DF	3	Shanon Phillip		(substituted on) 65'
FW	7	Marcus Julien		(substituted on) 82'
Manager:
(England) Mike Adams

Assistant referees:
Héctor Vergara (Canada)
Marvin Torrentera (Mexico)
Fourth official:
David Gantar (Canada)

=== Honduras vs Jamaica ===
June 13, 2011
21:00

Honduras	0–1	Jamaica
	Report	Johnson 36'

Red Bull Arena, Harrison
Attendance: 25,000
Referee: Joel Aguilar (El Salvador)

Honduras	Jamaica

GK	18	Noel Valladares (c)
RB	5	Víctor Bernárdez
CB	21	Juan García
CB	16	Mauricio Sabillón
LB	14	Boniek García
DM	2	Osman Chávez	(yellow card) 49'
RM	7	Emil Martínez		(substituted off) 46'
LM	12	Alfredo Mejía	(yellow card) 55'
AM	23	Edder Delgado		(substituted off) 76'
CF	9	Jerry Bengtson
CF	13	Carlo Costly		(substituted off) 26'
Substitutions:
MF	10	Ramón Núñez		(substituted on) 26'
FW	15	Walter Martínez		(substituted on) 46'
MF	19	Javier Arnaldo Portillo		(substituted on) 76'
Manager:
(Colombia) Luis Fernando Suárez

GK	13	Dwayne Miller
CB	19	Adrian Reid
CB	6	Jermaine Taylor
CB	12	Demar Phillips	(yellow card) 81'
RWB	15	Je-Vaughn Watson	(yellow card) 77'	(substituted off) 89'
LWB	16	Omar Daley		(substituted off) 85'
CM	7	Jason Morrison
CM	22	Damion Williams
CM	18	Keammar Daley	(yellow card) 87'
SS	11	Dane Richards
CF	9	Ryan Johnson		(substituted off) 83'
Substitutions:
FW	21	Luton Shelton		(substituted on) 83'
FW	8	Eric Vernan		(substituted on) 85'
MF	20	Navion Boyd	(yellow card) 90'	(substituted on) 89'
Manager:
Theodore Whitmore

Assistant referees:
William Torres (El Salvador)
Leonel Leal (Costa Rica)
Fourth official:
Wálter Quesada (Costa Rica)
