= Félix Rodríguez =

Félix Rodríguez may refer to:

- Félix Rodríguez (baseball) (born 1972), Major League Baseball pitcher
- Félix Rodríguez (soldier) (born 1941), former CIA intelligence operative
- Félix Rodríguez (Nicaraguan footballer) (born 1984), Nicaraguan football midfielder
- Félix Rodríguez, guitar player in the Swedish band, The Sounds
- Félix Rodríguez de la Fuente (1928–1980), Spanish naturalist and broadcaster
