= Rocastle =

Rocastle is a surname. Notable people with the surname include:

- Craig Rocastle (born 1981), English footballer
- David Rocastle (1967–2001), English footballer
