= Carlos Gallardo =

Carlos Gallardo may refer to:

- Carlos Gallardo (actor) (born 1966), Mexican actor and producer
- Carlos Gallardo (footballer) (born 1984), Guatemalan footballer
