= Manuel Gutiérrez =

Manuel Gutiérrez can refer to:

- Manuel Gutiérrez (Mexican footballer), born 1920
- Manuel Gutiérrez (Nicaraguan footballer), born 1987
- Manuel Gutiérrez (swimmer) (born 1964), Panamanian swimmer
