= Pedro Leal =

Pedro Leal may refer to:

- Pedro Leal (footballer) (born 1989), Costa Rican football player
- Pedro Leal (rugby union) (born 1984), Portuguese rugby player
- Pedro Rosso Leal, ambassador of Cuba to Angola
