= Daniel Jiménez =

Daniel Jiménez may refer to:

- Daniel Jiménez (boxer) (born 1969), former Puerto Rican boxer
- Daniel Jiménez (Costa Rican footballer) (born 1983), Costa Rican footballer
- Dani Jiménez (born 1990), Spanish footballer
- Dany Jiménez (born 1993), Dominican professional baseball pitcher
- Daniel Jiménez (footballer, born 1996), Mexican football midfielder for Pioneros de Cancún
- Daniel Jiménez, fictional presidential candidate in the TV series Succession

== See also ==
- Daniel Giménez (disambiguation)
