= Aramis Haywood =

Panamanian footballer (born 1985)

Personal information
- Date of birth: April 3, 1985 (age 41)
- Place of birth: Panama City, Panama
- Height: 1.80 m (5 ft 11 in)
- Position: Midfielder

Team information
- Current team: El Farolito

Senior career*
Years	Team	Apps	(Gls)
2005	Chorrillo		
2008–2009	Río Abajo		
2010	Atlético Veragüense	9	(1)
2010–2011	Plaza Amador	22	(1)
2012–2015	Sporting San Miguelito	96	(14)
2015–2017	Plaza Amador	32	(3)
2017–2018	Alianza	21	(1)
2019–	El Farolito		

International career^{‡}
2010–2011	Panama	5	(1)
- * Club domestic league appearances and goals ‡ National team caps and goals as of 10 June 2015

Aramis Haywood (born 3 April 1985) is a Panamanian football midfielder who currently plays for El Farolito Soccer Club in the National Premier Soccer League.

== Club career ==
He played for several Panamanian club sides and joined Sporting San Miguelito in January 2012. He was released by Sporting in summer 2015.

== International career ==
Haywood made his debut for Panama in an October 2010 friendly match against Cuba and has earned a total of 5 caps, scoring 1 goal. He represented his country at the 2011 Copa Centroamericana and the 2011 CONCACAF Gold Cup. Haywood scored his only goal with the national team in his second appearance, a 2–0 victory against Honduras in November 2010.

=== International goals ===
Scores and results list Panama's goal tally first.

#	Date	Venue	Opponent	Score	Result	Competition
1	17 November 2011	Estadio Rommel Fernández, Panama City, Panama	Honduras	2–0	2–0	Friendly match
