= Craig Rocastle =

Footballer (born 1981)

Personal information
- Full name: Craig Aaron Rocastle
- Date of birth: 17 August 1981 (age 45)
- Place of birth: Lewisham, London, England
- Height: 6 ft 1 in (1.85 m)
- Position: Midfielder

Youth career
- Samuel Montagu
- ????–2001: Gravesend and Northfleet

Senior career*
Years	Team	Apps	(Gls)
2001	Gravesend and Northfleet		
2001	→ Ashford Town (Kent) (loan)	4	(0)
2001–2003	Kingstonian	23	(0)
2003	Slough Town	13	(0)
2003–2005	Chelsea	0	(0)
2004	→ Barnsley (loan)	5	(0)
2004	→ Lincoln City (loan)	2	(0)
2004–2005	→ Hibernian (loan)	13	(0)
2005–2006	Sheffield Wednesday	28	(1)
2006	→ Yeovil Town (loan)	8	(0)
2006–2007	Oldham Athletic	35	(2)
2007–2008	Port Vale	23	(1)
2008	→ Gillingham (loan)	2	(0)
2008–2009	Thrasyvoulos	14	(0)
2009	Welling United	2	(0)
2009	Dover Athletic	2	(0)
2009–2010	Forest Green Rovers	15	(0)
2010–2011	Sporting Kansas City (Note: Sporting Kansas City was known as Kansas City Wizards during the 2010 season.)	29	(0)
2012	Thrasyvoulos	15	(0)
2012	Missouri Comets (indoor)	7	(0)
Total		240	(4)

International career
2010–2012	Grenada	12	(1)
- * Club domestic league appearances and goals

Craig Aaron Rocastle (born 17 August 1981) is a former professional footballer who played as a midfielder.

A former youth team player at Queens Park Rangers, in 2001, he joined Kingstonian from Gravesend and Northfleet after a loan spell with Ashford Town (Kent). He signed with Chelsea via Slough Town in 2003, and was loaned out to Barnsley, Lincoln City, and Hibernian. He joined Sheffield Wednesday in February 2005, helping the "Owls" to promotion out of League One via the play-offs in 2005. Loaned out to Yeovil Town, he switched to Oldham Athletic in 2006 before moving on to Port Vale in June 2007. He was loaned out to Gillingham before joining Greek side Thrasyvoulos in 2008. He returned to England the following year with Welling United, later playing for Dover Athletic and Forest Green Rovers. He joined American club Sporting Kansas City in March 2010 and briefly played for the Missouri Comets in January 2012, before he returned to Thrasyvoulos. Born in England, he represented Grenada internationally.

== Club career ==
Rocastle was with Isthmian League Premier Division club Gravesend and Northfleet when in September 2001 he went on trial to Queens Park Rangers, who during his stay with them went into administration. After a loan spell in November 2001 with Southern League Eastern Division club Ashford Town (Kent), it was announced in early December 2001 that he had left Gravesend and Northfleet. Later that month (initially on a one-month trial) Rocastle signed with Isthmian League Premier Division side Kingstonian for whom he made 23 goal-less league appearances. In February 2003 he signed with Slough Town, making 13 Isthmian League Division One North appearances without scoring. He then signed with Premier League club Chelsea in 2003, although he did not make a first-team appearance, appearing once as a non-playing substitute.

Rocastle made his debut in the English Football League on 14 February 2004, at the age of 22, playing for Barnsley in a 1–0 defeat at Wrexham's Racecourse Ground. He had joined the Yorkshiremen on loan and made another four Second Division appearances before leaving Oakwell the next month. In late-March he joined Third Division side Lincoln City on loan, but only made two substitute appearances before returning to Stamford Bridge before the end of the season.

He spent the first half of the 2004–05 season at Tony Mowbray's Hibernian, playing 13 league games in a very successful season for the SPL club. The club had kept faith with the midfielder as he damaged a thigh muscle in September and was feared to have damaged knee ligaments in December, and were hopeful of acquiring him permanently. With no future with Chelsea, he instead joined Sheffield Wednesday on a free transfer in February 2005, signing a 2 1/2-year deal. His first senior goal came in a 3–2 win over Blackpool at Hillsborough on 12 March. He played for the "Owls" in the League One play-off final, which finished as a 4–2 victory over Hartlepool United at the Millennium Stadium in front of close to 60,000 spectators.

Rocastle played 17 games of the club's 2005–06 Championship season before going out on loan to League One side Yeovil Town in late-March. At the end of the season Rocastle's contract at Wednesday was terminated by mutual consent. He quickly signed for Oldham Athletic. He played 35 league games in 2006–07, helping Oldham to a play-off place. However, most of these appearances were as a substitute. In the play-offs they were defeated by eventual promotion winners Blackpool in the semi-finals.

In June 2007, he signed a two-year deal to join Port Vale. He was not a first-team favourite in 2007–08, but did manage 21 starts and a goal against Cheltenham Town at Vale Park. He spent two weeks in January on loan with League One rivals Gillingham, playing two games for the "Gills". After talks with manager Lee Sinnott, his contract was terminated by mutual consent in April 2008.

Rocastle had a trial with Hibernian in May 2008, having impressed on loan there previously, but manager Mixu Paatelainen did not offer him a contract. Rocastle instead joined Thrasyvoulos Filis in the Super League Greece. He made 13 appearances for the club in 2008–09. However, they finished bottom with a mere 14 points from 30 games and were relegated to the Football League.

Rocastle then joined Crewe Alexandra for a trial, but he failed to win a contract after playing 45 minutes in a pre-season friendly with Nantwich Town. He played for Aberdeen as a trialist in the Dean Windass testimonial match against Hull City, however, he was not offered a contract by the club. In August 2009, he signed for Welling United, but left almost immediately after two Conference South appearances and joined Dover Athletic on a non-contract basis. He made his debut for Dover as a substitute in an 8–0 win over East Preston in the FA Cup. However, his stay at the Kent club was short, and in October 2009, he joined Forest Green Rovers on a non-contract basis. Rocastle impressed on his Forest Green debut, winning the man of the match award in Rovers 1–1 draw with Eastbourne Borough. He went on to make 15 appearances in the Conference National for Forest Green before interest was shown in him by Swedish and American clubs.

Following a short trial in March 2010, Rocastle departed Forest Green to sign for Kansas City Wizards in Major League Soccer. He played 12 matches in 2010, however, he was waived by Kansas City head coach Peter Vermes following the 2011 season on 23 November 2011. Six weeks later, on 4 January 2012, Rocastle signed with the Missouri Comets of the Major Indoor Soccer League. Ten days later he returned to Thrasyvoulos.

== International career ==
Rocastle was eligible to play for both Grenada or Jamaica as his father was from Grenada and his mother was from Jamaica. He made his Grenada international debut on 26 November 2010, in a 2010 Caribbean Cup match against Martinique at the Stade d'Honneur de Dillon in Fort-de-France. He was named by coach Mike Adams in the 2011 CONCACAF Gold Cup at the United States, and played the first half of the 4–0 defeat to Jamaica at The Home Depot Center, before being taken off for Lancaster Joseph. Grenada exited the competition after finishing bottom of their group. On 15 November 2012, Rocastle scored from an indirect free kick from 22 yards (20 m) out in a 1–1 draw with French Guiana.

== Personal life ==
He is a cousin of the late England and Arsenal midfielder David Rocastle.

== Career statistics ==
=== Club ===
Appearances and goals by club, season and competition
Club	Season	League			National cup (Note: Includes FA Cup, Scottish Cup, Greek Cup, U.S. Open Cup)		Other		Total	
Club	Season	Division	Apps	Goals	Apps	Goals	Apps	Goals	Apps	Goals
Ashford Town (Kent)	2001	Southern Football League; Eastern Division	4	0	0	0	1	1	5	1
Kingstonian	2001–02	Isthmian League; Premier Division	14	0	0	0	2	0	16	0
Kingstonian	2002–03	Isthmian League; Premier Division	9	0	0	0	6	1	15	1
Kingstonian	Total		23	0	0	0	8	1	31	1
Slough Town	2003–04	Isthmian League; Division One North	13	0	0	0	0	0	13	0
Chelsea	2003–04	Premier League	0	0	0	0	0	0	0	0
Chelsea	2004–05	Premier League	0	0	0	0	0	0	0	0
Chelsea	Total		0	0	0	0	0	0	0	0
Barnsley (loan)	2003–04	Second Division	5	0	0	0	0	0	5	0
Lincoln City (loan)	2003–04	Third Division	2	0	0	0	0	0	2	0
Hibernian (loan)	2003–04	Scottish Premier League	13	0	0	0	1	0	14	0
Sheffield Wednesday	2004–05	League One	11	1	0	0	3	0	14	1
Sheffield Wednesday	2005–06	Championship	17	0	0	0	2	0	19	0
Sheffield Wednesday	Total		28	1	0	0	5	0	33	1
Yeovil Town (loan)	2005–06	League One	8	0	0	0	0	0	8	0
Oldham Athletic	2006–07	League One	35	2	2	0	2	1	39	3
Port Vale	2007–08	League One	23	1	2	0	2	0	27	1
Gillingham (loan)	2007–08	League One	2	0	0	0	0	0	2	0
Thrasyvoulos	2008–09	Super League Greece	14	0					14	0
Welling United	2009–10	Conference South	2	0	0	0	0	0	2	0
Dover Athletic	2009–10	Conference South	2	0	0	0	3	0	5	0
Forest Green Rovers	2009–10	Conference Premier	15	0	0	0	0	0	15	0
Sporting Kansas City	2010	Major League Soccer	23	0	0	0	0	0	23	0
Sporting Kansas City	2011	Major League Soccer	6	0	0	0	0	0	6	0
Sporting Kansas City	Total		29	0	0	0	0	0	29	0
Thrasyvoulos	2011–12	Super League Greece	15	0	0	0	1	0	16	0
Missouri Comets (indoor)	2012–13	Major Indoor Soccer League	7	0					7	0
Career total			240	4	4	0	23	3	267	7

=== International ===
Appearances and goals by national team and year
National team	Year	Apps	Goals
Grenada	2010	5	0
Grenada	2011	4	0
Grenada	2012	3	1
Total		12	1

== Honours ==
Sheffield Wednesday

- Football League One play-offs: 2005
