= Daniel Giménez =

Daniel Giménez may refer to:

- Daniel Giménez (footballer, born 1977), Argentine footballer
- Daniel Giménez (football manager) (born 1984), Spanish football coach
- Daniel Giménez Cacho (born 1961), Spanish-born Mexican actor
- Dani Giménez (born 1983), Spanish footballer

== See also ==
- Daniela Giménez (born 1992), Argentine Paralympic swimmer
- Daniel Jiménez (disambiguation)
