= Teculután =

- Municipality
- Location in Guatemala
- Coordinates: 14°58′59″N 89°34′0″W
- Country: Guatemala
- Department: Zacapa

Area
  - Municipality: 56 sq mi (144 km^{2})

Population (2018 census)
  - Municipality: 17,602
  - Density: 317/sq mi (122/km^{2})
  - Urban: 5,585
- Climate: Aw

Teculután is a town and municipality in the Guatemalan department of Zacapa.

There is a Pollo Campero there and Pizza Burger Diner as well.

== Sports ==
Deportivo Teculután football club play in Guatemala's second division, but spent three seasons at the highest domestic football level between 2001 and 2004.

They play their home games in the Estadio Julio Héctor Paz Castilla.
