= Pedro Leal (footballer) =

Costa Rican footballer (born 1989)

Personal information
- Full name: Pedro Luis Leal Valencia
- Date of birth: 31 January 1989 (age 37)
- Place of birth: Puntarenas, Costa Rica
- Height: 1.74 m (5 ft 9 in)
- Position: Left-back

Team information
- Current team: Guanacasteca
- Number: 20

Senior career*
Years	Team	Apps	(Gls)
2008–2011	Puntarenas	73	(0)
2011–2012	→ Senica (loan)	24	(0)
2012–2013	Puntarenas	19	(0)
2014	Deportiva Carmelita	32	(3)
2015	Pérez Zeledón	23	(0)
2015–2016	UCR	22	(0)
2016–2018	Carmelita	40	(1)
2018–2019	San Carlos	13	(1)
2019	Puntarenas		
2020	Limón	18	(0)
2020–	Guanacasteca	119	(1)

International career
2009	Costa Rica U20	1	(0)
2010	Costa Rica U21	1	(0)
2011–	Costa Rica	13	(0)
- * Club domestic league appearances and goals as of 21:04, 17 November 2024 (UTC)

Pedro Luis Leal Valencia (born 31 January 1989) is a Costa Rican football player who plays for Guanacasteca as a left-back.

== Club career ==
Leal started his career at hometown club Puntarenas.

=== FK Senica ===
In September 2011, he joined Slovak club FK Senica on one-year loan from Puntarenas. He made his debut for Senica against Ružomberok on 9 September 2011. In summer 2012 he returned to Puntarenas.

In January 2014 Leal joined Deportiva Carmelita.

Ahead of the 2019–20 season, Leal returned to his hometown club Puntarenas.

== International career ==
Leal played in the 2009 FIFA U-20 World Cup held in Egypt.

He made his debut for Costa Rica in a January 2011 Copa Centroamericana match against Guatemala and has, as of May 2014, earned a total of 11 caps, scoring no goals. He represented his country in 1 FIFA World Cup qualification match and played at the 2011 Copa Centroamericana and the 2011 Copa América.
