= Manuel Gutiérrez (Nicaraguan footballer) =

Nicaraguan footballer

Personal information
- Full name: Manuel Salvador Gutiérrez Castro
- Date of birth: January 20, 1987 (age 39)
- Place of birth: Nicaragua
- Position: Defender

Team information
- Current team: Managua
- Number: 29

Senior career*
Years	Team	Apps	(Gls)
2007–2011	Diriangén		
2012–	Managua		

International career^{‡}
2011–	Nicaragua	4	(0)
- * Club domestic league appearances and goals as of 23:59, 22 February 2012 (UTC) ‡ National team caps and goals as of 23:59, 22 February 2012 (UTC)

Manuel Salvador Gutiérrez Castro (born January 20, 1987) is a Nicaraguan football Federación defender.

== Club career ==
He has played for Diriangén before joining Managua in January 2012.

== International career ==
Gutiérrez made his debut for Nicaragua in a January 2011 Copa Centroamericana match against Belize and has, as of December 2013, earned a total of 4 caps, scoring no goals. He has represented his country in 1 FIFA World Cup qualification match and played at the 2011 Copa Centroamericana.
