= Donny Grant =

Costa Rican footballer (born 1976)

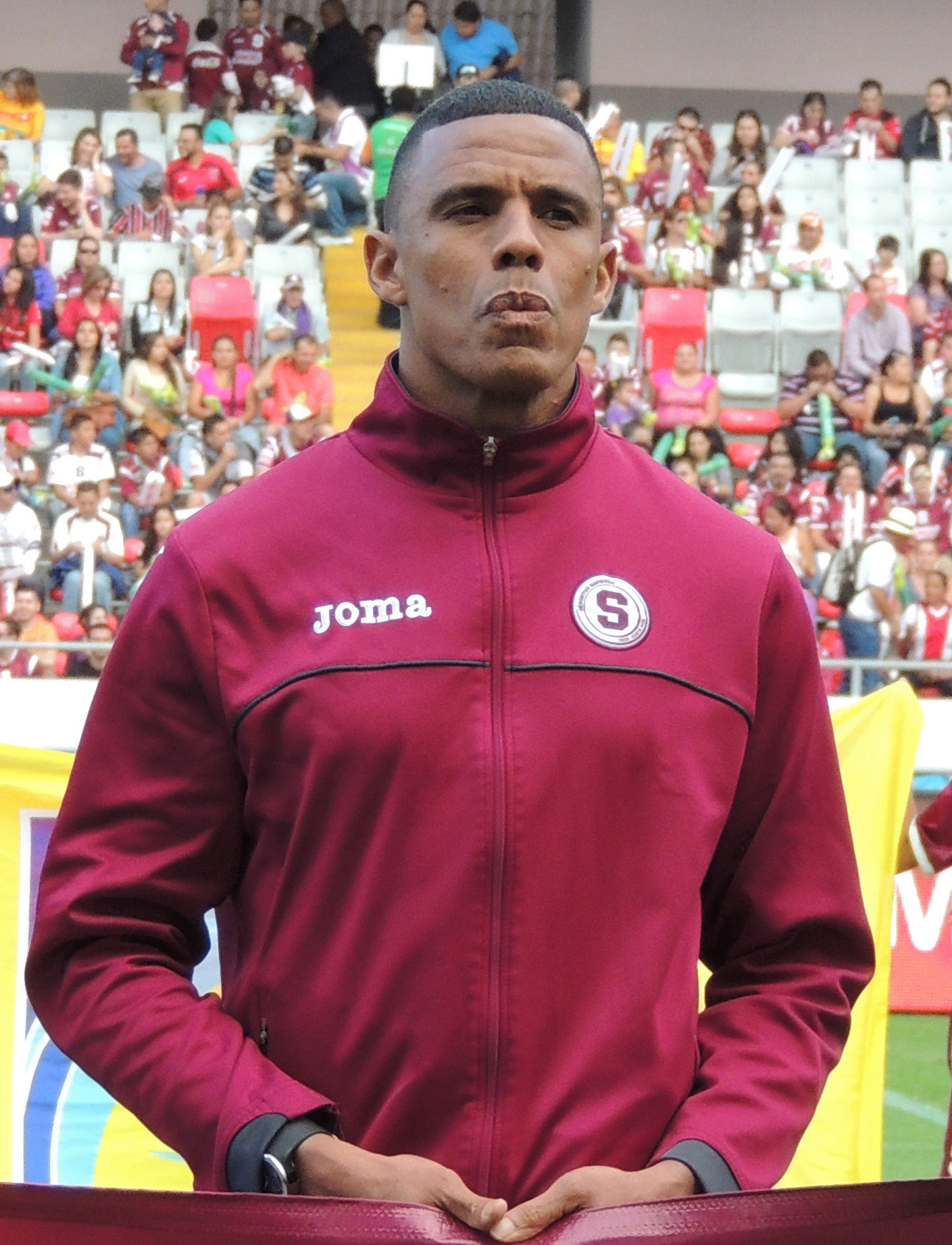
- Grant in 2015

Personal information
- Full name: Donny Grant Zamora
- Date of birth: 12 April 1976 (age 50)
- Place of birth: Limón, Costa Rica
- Height: 1.81 m (5 ft 11 in)
- Position: Goalkeeper

Senior career*
Years	Team	Apps	(Gls)
1998–2001	Limonense		
2001	FAS		
2002	Santos de Guápiles	2	(0)
2002–2006	Pérez Zeledón		
2006–2009	Cartaginés	74	(0)
2009–2011	San Carlos	69	(0)
2011–2017	Saprissa	61	(0)

International career
2005–2011	Costa Rica	8	(0)
- * Club domestic league appearances and goals

Donny Grant Zamora (born 12 April 1976) is a Costa Rican former professional footballer who played as a goalkeeper.

== Club career ==
Grant started his career in 1998 at Limonense and moved abroad to join Salvadoran side FAS in summer 2001. He left them for Santos de Guápiles in February 2002 only to join Pérez Zeledón after half a season. He later played for Cartaginés and San Carlos, where he forced his way out in summer 2011 to sign for Saprissa.

== International career ==
He made his debut for Costa Rica in a February 2005 UNCAF Nations Cup match against Panama and earned a total of 8 caps, scoring no goals. He represented his country at the 2005 and 2011 UNCAF Nations Cups. He was a non-playing squad member at both the 2005 and 2011 CONCACAF Gold Cup.

His final international was a December 2011 friendly match against Cuba.
