= Montrose Phinn =

Jamaican footballer (born 1987)

Personal information
- Full name: Montrose Dujon Phinn
- Date of birth: 25 November 1987 (age 38)
- Position: Defender

Team information
- Current team: Harbour View

Senior career*
Years	Team	Apps	(Gls)
2007–	Harbour View	111	(1)

International career^{‡}
2011–2013	Jamaica	5	(0)
- * Club domestic league appearances and goals as of 19:13, 30 May 2020 (UTC) ‡ National team caps and goals as of 19:13, 30 May 2020 (UTC)

Montrose Dujon Phinn (born 25 November 1987) is a Jamaican international footballer who plays for Harbour View, as a defender.

== Career ==
Phinn has played club football for Harbour View.

He made his international debut for Jamaica in 2011.
