= Ricardo Jérez (footballer, born 1986) =

Guatemalan footballer (born 1986)

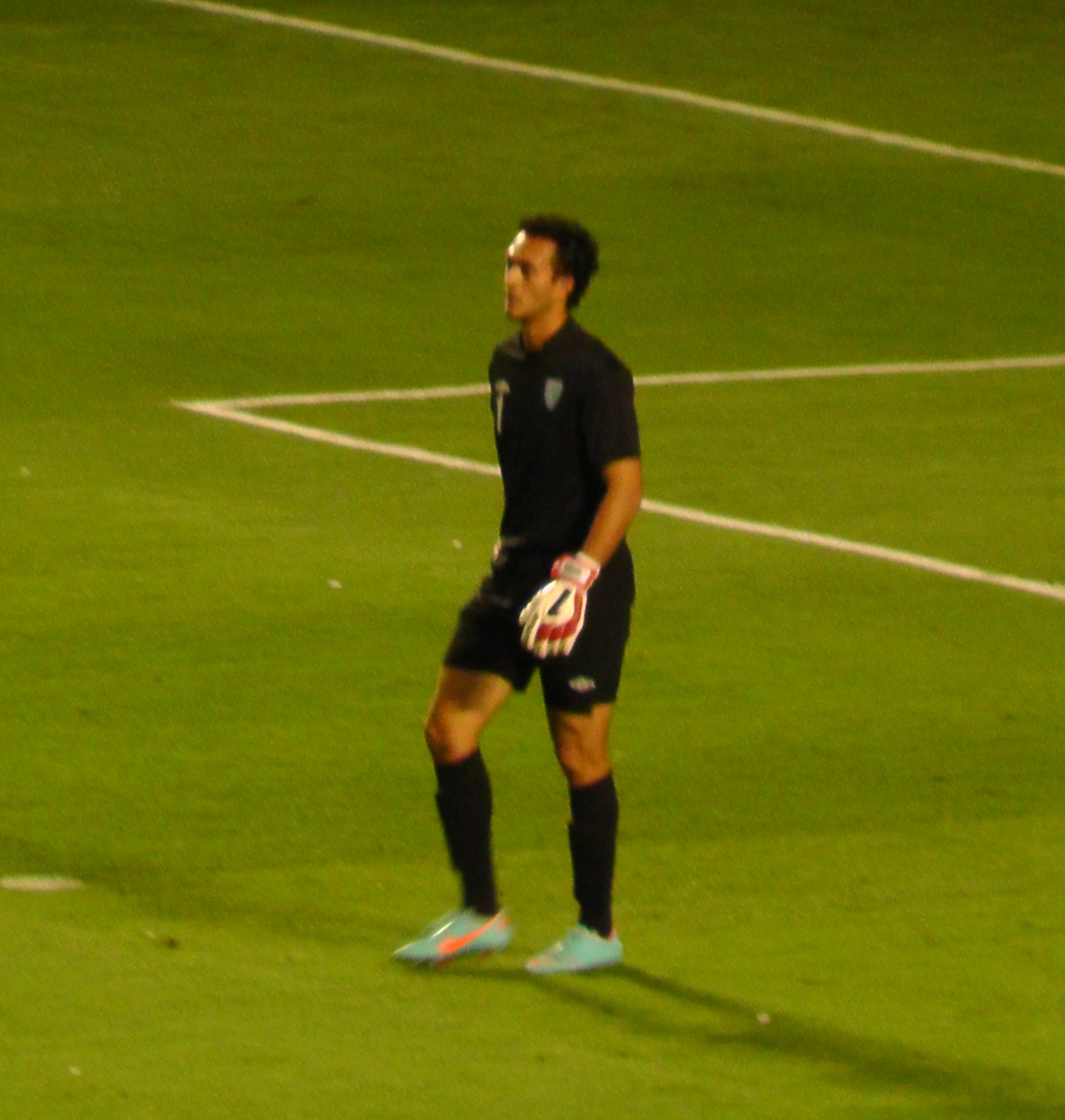
- Jérez with Guatemala in 2013

Personal information
- Full name: Ricardo Antonio Jérez Figueroa
- Date of birth: 4 February 1986 (age 40)
- Place of birth: Guatemala City, Guatemala
- Height: 1.93 m (6 ft 4 in)
- Position: Goalkeeper

Team information
- Current team: Chattanooga Red Wolves
- Number: 12

Youth career
- Comunicaciones

Senior career*
Years	Team	Apps	(Gls)
2005–2006	Cobán Imperial	13	(0)
2006–2007	Municipal	2	(0)
2007–2008	Comunicaciones	3	(0)
2008–2009	Rentistas	18	(0)
2009–2010	Jalapa	18	(0)
2010	Club Comunicaciones	0	(0)
2011–2012	Marquense	64	(0)
2013–2021	Alianza Petrolera	250	(0)
2017	→ Deportivo Cali (loan)	8	(0)
2021–2023	Municipal	79	(0)
2023–	Chattanooga Red Wolves	17	(0)

International career^{‡}
2008	Guatemala U23	5	(0)
2006–2023	Guatemala	62	(0)
- * Club domestic league appearances and goals as of 31 October 2026 ‡ National team caps and goals as of 12:20, 6 June 2022 (UTC)

Ricardo Antonio Jérez Figueroa (born 4 February 1986) is a Guatemalan professional footballer who plays as a goalkeeper for USL League One club Chattanooga Red Wolves.

== Club career ==
Jerez is the son of the also former national team goalkeeper Ricardo Jérez who played in the 1988 Olympics.

Jerez Jr. came through the youth ranks of local giants CSD Comunicaciones before joining Cobán Imperial and C.S.D. Municipal.

=== Rentistas (2008–2009) ===
On early August 2008, he was sent to Uruguay to participate in some tests with Peñarol, which he failed but he was able to stay in the country to play for the Rentistas team which competed in the Uruguayan Segunda División. He made his debut on 13 September against local rivals Cerrito, match which his team lost 2–1, but he was able to save a penalty shot by Richard Requelme and was named man of the match. Later, in the third round of the tournament, he saved again a penalty now against Boston River.

=== Back to Guatemala (2009–2010) ===
He then returned to Guatemala in September 2009 to play for Deportivo Jalapa

In the summer of 2010, he joined Argentinian third division side Club Comunicaciones. He remained six months on the club and could not play due to problems with his documents.

Later, Jerez returned to Guatemala where he played for USAC in a campaign that saw them suffer relegation.

=== Deportivo Marquense (2011–2012) ===
He then was signed by Deportivo Marquense in mid-2011, where between the playoffs of the 2011 Apertura and the 2012 Clausura tournament has set a new CONCACAF club record with 941 consecutive minutes without allowing a goal, a streak put to an end by Eliseo Quintanilla of Municipal.

=== Alianza Petrolera (2013–2022) ===
Jerez joined Alianza Petrolera in January 2013, at the time being the only non-domestic player in the squad. He recorded a clean sheet in his first league match in Colombia, in a 1–0 win against La Equidad on 8 January 2013. Throughout his time at the club, he has been regarded as an important figure in the team's success. In October 2013, the club announced the extension of Jerez's contract, which would end after the 2016 season. He's the first player to have played at least 100 games in the top division with the club.

=== Chattanooga Red Wolves (2023–present) ===
Jérez signed with USL League One club Chattanooga Red Wolves on 10 January 2023.

== International career ==
Jerez made his debut for Guatemala in a January 2006 friendly match against the United States. He has represented his country in 2 FIFA World Cup qualification processes and at the 2009 UNCAF Nations Cup.

In 2008, he was selected for the Guatemala U-23 squad to participate in the 2008 CONCACAF Men's Olympic Qualifying where they could not qualify for the 2008 Summer Olympics.

He played in all of his team's matches at the 2011 CONCACAF Gold Cup, and was the starting goalkeeper for Guatemala in 11 of Guatemala's 12 matches during the 2014 FIFA World Cup qualification.

== Personal life ==
Jérez's father, also named Ricardo Jérez, was also a professional footballer.

== Honours ==
Municipal

- Liga Nacional de Guatemala: Apertura 2006

== Career statistics ==
Club	Season	League		Domestic Cup		International		Total	
Club	Season	Apps	Goals	Apps	Goals	Apps	Goals	Apps	Goals
Marquense	2011–12	44	—	—	—	—	—	44	—
Marquense	2012–13	20	—	—	—	—	—	20	—
Marquense	Total	64	—	—	—	—	—	64	—
Alianza Petrolera	2013	35	—	3	—	—	—	38	—
Alianza Petrolera	2014	31	—	3	—	—	—	34	—
Alianza Petrolera	2015	38	—	—	—	—	—	38	—
Alianza Petrolera	2016	39	—	2	—	—	—	41	—
Alianza Petrolera	2017	20	—	4	—	—	—	24	—
Alianza Petrolera	2018	32	—	1	—	—	—	33	—
Alianza Petrolera	2019	36	—	2	—	—	—	38	—
Alianza Petrolera	2020	16	—	2	—	—	—	18	—
Alianza Petrolera	2021	2	—	0	—	—	—	2	—
Total		249	—	17	—	—	—	266	—
Career total		313	—	17	—	—	—	330	—
