= Rafael Burgos =

Salvadoran footballer (born 1988)

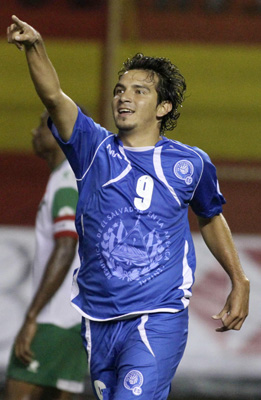

Personal information
- Full name: Rafael Edgardo Burgos
- Date of birth: June 3, 1988 (age 38)
- Place of birth: San Pedro Nonualco, La Paz, El Salvador
- Height: 1.73 m (5 ft 8 in)
- Position: Forward

Team information
- Current team: Platense

Youth career
- 2002: Escuela Famosa
- 2003: Escuela La Chelona

Senior career*
| Years | Team | Apps | (Gls) |
| 2004–2009 | Alianza F.C. | | |
| 2009–2010 | Santa Tecla F.C. | | |
| 2010 | C.D. UES | | |
| 2011–2012 | Alianza F.C. | | |
| 2012 | Deportivo Petapa | 17 | (3) |
| 2012–2015 | SV Ried | 0 | (0) |
| 2012 | → Baník Ostrava (loan) | 0 | (0) |
| 2012–2013 | → Kecskemét (loan) | 20 | (5) |
| 2013–2014 | → Győri ETO (loan) | 9 | (1) |
| 2014 | → Minnesota United (loan) | 8 | (0) |
| 2015 | Fredrikstad | 7 | (1) |
| 2015 | C.D. FAS | 23 | (5) |
| 2016 | Universidad SC | | |
| 2016 | Sonsonate F.C. | 19 | (3) |
| 2017 | C.D. FAS | 37 | (5) |
| 2017–2018 | Sonsonate F.C. | 18 | (1) |
| 2019 | Luis Ángel Firpo | 14 | (3) |
| 2019–2020 | Independiente F.C. | 4 | (0) |
| 2021– | Platense | 42 | (5) |

International career
| 2010– | El Salvador | 51 | (13) |
- * Club domestic league appearances and goals as of 19:00, 22 September 2019 (UTC)

Rafael Edgardo Burgos (born June 3, 1988) is a Salvadoran professional footballer who plays as a forward for Independiente.

== Club career ==
Burgos was born in La Paz, El Salvador. He started his career at Alianza F.C., but moved to Segunda División club Santa Tecla F.C. to get more playing time. In 2010, he returned to the highest level to play with UES. In 2011, he rejoined his old club Alianza F.C.

In 2012, he transferred to Deportivo Petapa, scoring his first goal in a victory against Municipal on February 12, 2012. He scored another goal on March 3, 2012, against C.D. Suchitepéquez, and his last goal for the end of his 2011–12 season on May 4, 2012, against Juventud Retalteca. Even though he started late in Petapa's season he scored five goals in nine games.

On August 8, 2012, Burgos signed a loan deal with Baník Ostrava on loan from Austrian Bundesliga club SV Ried. On the 31st, he moved on loan to Kecskemét of Hungary after Baník did not reach an economic agreement with the player.

After spending a season with Kecskemét, he went on a second loan to Hungarian champions Győri ETO, where he appeared in nine league games, scoring one goal

In February 2015, he cancelled his contract with SV Ried, becoming a free agent

On March 17, 2015, Rafael "Tatarata" Burgos signed with Fredrikstad Fotballklubb (also known as Fredrikstad FK or FFK) which is a Norwegian football club from the town of Fredrikstad.

== International career ==
Burgos received his first appearance with the El Salvador national team in a game versus Panama, with the game ending in a loss of 1–0.

In his second cap with El Salvador, Burgos scored his first goal, on Costa Rican soil. A feat that did not happen since 1991 when Raúl Díaz Arce, in the first edition the UNCAF tournament, scored on Costa Rican soil.

Burgos was called up by José Luis Rugamas to train with the senior team in preparation for the 2011 Central American Cup in January 2010. Burgos scored the first goal for El Salvador for the year on January 14, 2011, in a 2–0 victory against Nicaragua.

On January 16, 2011, he scored two goals against Belize helping his team out with a 5–2 victory. On February 11, 2011, he scored another goal in a 3–2 loss in a friendly against Jamaica.

Burgos scored his first goals in the World Cup Qualifications on November 15, 2011, against Suriname. His two goals in that game and the two goals of Osael Romero scored lead to a 4–0 victory.

Burgos scored two goals against the "Oceania leader" New Zealand in a 2–2 draw.

== Career statistics ==
| # | Date | Venue | Opponent | Result | Competitions |
|---|---|---|---|---|---|
| 1 | October 12, 2010 | Estadio Carlos Ugalde Álvarez, Ciudad Quesada, Costa Rica | Costa Rica | 2–1 | Friendly |
| 2 | January 14, 2011 | Estadio Rommel Fernández, Panama City, Panama | Nicaragua | 2–0 | 2011 Copa Centroamericana |
| 3 | January 16, 2011 | Estadio Rommel Fernández, Panama City, Panama | Belize | 5–2 | 2011 Copa Centroamericana |
| 4 | January 16, 2011 | Estadio Rommel Fernández, Panama City, Panama | Belize | 5–2 | 2011 Copa Centroamericana |
| 5 | February 9, 2011 | Estadio Cuscatlán, San Salvador, El Salvador | Haiti | 1–0 | Friendly |
| 6 | November 15, 2011 | Estadio Cuscatlán, San Salvador, El Salvador | Suriname | 4–0 | 2014 WCQ |
| 7 | November 15, 2011 | Estadio Cuscatlán, San Salvador, El Salvador | Suriname | 4–0 | 2014 WCQ |
| 8 | May 23, 2012 | BBVA Compass Stadium, Houston, United States | New Zealand | 2–2 | Friendly |
| 9 | September 11, 2012 | Providence Stadium, Providence, Guyana | Guyana | 2–3 | 2014 WCQ |
| 10 | January 18, 2013 | Estadio Nacional, San Jose, Costa Rica | Honduras | 1–1 | 2013 Copa Centroamericana |
| 11 | September 2, 2014 | Robert F. Kennedy, Washington, D.C., United States | Guatemala | 2–1 | 2014 Copa Centroamericana |
| 12 | September 10, 2014 | BBVA Compass Stadium, Houston, United States | Belize | 2–0 | 2014 Copa Centroamericana |
| 13 | October 14, 2014 | Red Bull Arena, Harrison, United States | Ecuador | 1–5 | Friendly |

== Honours ==
Alianza

- Primera División: Clausura 2011

Minnesota United

- North American Supporters' Trophy: 2014

Individual

- Copa Centroamericana Golden Boot: 2011
