= Patrece Liburd =

Kittitian footballer (born 1988)

Personal information
- Full name: Patrece Ovel Oscar Liburd
- Date of birth: 3 January 1988 (age 38)
- Place of birth: Leeds, England
- Height: 6 ft 4 in (1.93 m)
- Position: Defender

Team information
- Current team: Frickley Athletic

Youth career
- Bradford City
- ?–: Nottingham Forest

Senior career*
Years	Team	Apps	(Gls)
2006–2007	Nottingham Forest	0	(0)
2007	Guiseley	0	(0)
2007–2008	Worcester City	9	(0)
2008–2009	Dorchester Town	27	(1)
2009	Macclesfield Town	1	(0)
2009–2010	Farsley Celtic		
2010–2011	Droylsden		
2011–2012	RRFC Montegnee		
2012	Harrogate Town	1	(0)
2012	Garforth Town	?	(?)
2012	Curzon Ashton	1	(0)
2012–	Frickley Athletic		

International career^{‡}
- Saint Kitts and Nevis U20
2008–	Saint Kitts and Nevis	4	(0)
- * Club domestic league appearances and goals as of 18:38, 16 March 2011 (UTC) ‡ National team caps and goals as of 11:17, 27 November 2012 (UTC)

Patrece Ovel Liburd (born 1 March 1988) is a Kittitian footballer who plays as a defender.

== Career ==
His career began with Bradford City before moving onto Nottingham Forest where he played in youth and reserve team games. He was then released and after a short spell on trial with Cardiff City he joined Worcester City, who were then managed by Andy Preece. After recovering from an injury he joined Dorchester Town for the remainder of the 2007–08 season. At the end of that season he was offered a 12-month contract at Dorchester and was made team captain. However, after the club went into financial difficulties in February 2009, he was released from his contract and after impressing in a trial with League Two side Macclesfield Town joined on a non-contract basis until the end of the 2008–09 season. In March 2010, Liburd signed for Droylsden after Farsley Celtic folded.

In November 2012, he joined Curzon Ashton on a free transfer from Garforth Town.

He has also played for Saint Kitts and Nevis in the 2010 FIFA World Cup qualifying games. He received his first cap in the 2010 FIFA World Cup qualification tournament for Saint Kitts and Nevis against Belize on 6 February 2008. At the youth level he played in the 2007 CONCACAF U-20 Championship.

=== Caps for senior national team ===
#	Date	Played against	Appearances		Goals	Result	#	Competition
#	Date	Played against	Start	Sub	Goals	Result	#	Competition
1.	6 February 2008	Belize	1	0	0	1–3	L	2010 FIFA World Cup qualification
