= Henry Medina =

Guatemalan footballer

Personal information
- Full name: Henry Alexander Medina Blasac
- Date of birth: March 16, 1981 (age 45)
- Place of birth: Nueva Concepción, Escuintla, Guatemala
- Height: 1.80 m (5 ft 11 in)
- Position: Centre back

Team information
- Current team: CD Suchitepéquez

Senior career*
Years	Team	Apps	(Gls)
2002–2004	Deportivo Teculután		
2004–2008	CSD Municipal	95	(2)
2008–2009	CSD Xinabajul		
2010–present	CD Suchitepéquez		

International career^{‡}
2004–2007	Guatemala	18	(1)
- * Club domestic league appearances and goals as of 22 February 2010 ‡ National team caps and goals as of 22 February 2010

Henry Medina (born 16 March 1981) is a Guatemalan football defender. He currently plays for CD Suchitepéquez in Guatemala's top division.

== Club career ==
Medina played for Deportivo Teculután prior to joining Guatemalan giants CSD Municipal in 2004. He left the squad after four years to play for Deportivo Xinabajul in Guatemala's top division. However, in November 2009, he announced his departure due to financial complications at the Huehuetenango club.

He subsequently joined Mazatenango side Suchi.

== International career ==
Medina made his debut for Guatemala in a July 2004 friendly match against El Salvador in which game he immediately scored the only goal. He went on to collect a total of 18 caps, scoring 1 goal. He has represented his country at the UNCAF Nations Cup 2007 and was a member of the Guatemala national team for the 2007 CONCACAF Gold Cup.

Medina's final international was an August 2007 friendly match against Panama.

=== International goals ===
Scores and results list. Guatemala's goal tally first.

#	Date	Venue	Opponent	Score	Result	Competition
1	18 July 2004	Los Angeles Memorial Coliseum, Los Angeles, United States	El Salvador	1-0	1-0	Friendly match
