= Nicholas Beckett =

Jamaican footballer (born 1987)

Personal information
- Date of birth: 9 November 1987 (age 38)
- Position: Midfielder

Team information
- Current team: Harbour View

Senior career*
Years	Team	Apps	(Gls)
2011–	Harbour View	76	(6)

International career^{‡}
2014–	Jamaica	5	(0)
- * Club domestic league appearances and goals as of 8 June 2014 ‡ National team caps and goals as of 9 June 2015

Nicholas Beckett (born 9 November 1987) is a Jamaican international footballer who plays for Harbour View, as a midfielder.

== Career ==
Beckett has played club football for Harbour View.

He made his international debut for Jamaica in 2014.
