= Deportivo Teculután =

Association football club in Guatemala

- Ground: Estadio Julio Héctor Paz Castilla, Teculután, Guatemala
- Capacity: 4,000
- Manager: (Guatemala) Luis Fernando Ibarra
- League: Segunda División de Ascenso
- 2010 Clausura Grupo B: 10th

Deportivo Teculután is a Guatemalan football club based in Teculután, Zacapa Department.

They play their home games in the Estadio Julio Héctor Paz Castilla.

== History ==
They have been playing in Guatemala's second division since 2004, after they spent 3 seasons at the highest domestic level.

== Current squad ==
Note: Flags indicate national team as defined under FIFA eligibility rules; some limited exceptions apply. Players may hold more than one non-FIFA nationality.

No.	Pos.	Nation	Player
—	MF	(Guatemala) GUA	Marlon Aguirre
—		(Guatemala) GUA	José Esteban Chacón
—		(Guatemala) GUA	Julio César Morales
—		(Guatemala) GUA	César Molina
—		(Guatemala) GUA	Fredy Aldana
—		(Guatemala) GUA	Oscar Vásquez
—		(Guatemala) GUA	Byron Ramírez
—		(Guatemala) GUA	Julio Espinoza
—		(Guatemala) GUA	Juan Carlos Valdez
—		(Guatemala) GUA	Rudy Trinidad
—		(Guatemala) GUA	Juan Luis Aceituno
—		(Guatemala) GUA	Robert Waldemar Alonso
—		(Guatemala) GUA	Alvaro Cordon

No.	Pos.	Nation	Player
—		(Guatemala) GUA	Jhony Morales
—		(Guatemala) GUA	Jhony Cabrera
—		(Guatemala) GUA	Eduardo Salas
—		(Guatemala) GUA	Kelwin López
—		(Guatemala) GUA	Gerson Rodríguez
—		(Guatemala) GUA	Marco Catalan
—		(Guatemala) GUA	Franklin Rivas
—		(Brazil) BRA	Germano Zielinski
—		(Guatemala) GUA	Selvin Gudiel
—		(Honduras) HON	Darwin Morales
—		(Guatemala) GUA	Marvin Garrido
—		(Guatemala) GUA	Juan Joel Mota
—		(Guatemala) GUA	Luis Eduardo Ibarra
