= Lester Morris =

Saint Kitts and Nevis football manager

Personal information
- Place of birth: Saint Kitts and Nevis

Managerial career
- Years: Team
- 2008: Saint Kitts and Nevis
- 2011–2012: Saint Kitts and Nevis U-20
- 201x–2014: Conaree FC

Lester Morris is a Saint Kitts and Nevis professional football manager.

== Career ==
From February to September 2008 he coached the Saint Kitts and Nevis national football team. Later he coaches the Conaree FC
