= Eric Vásquez =

Panamanian footballer (born 1988)

Personal information
- Full name: Eric Enrique Vásquez Martínez
- Date of birth: 8 January 1988 (age 38)
- Place of birth: Panama City, Panama
- Height: 1.86 m (6 ft 1 in)
- Position: Right-back

Team information
- Current team: Herrera
- Number: 23

Youth career
- Independiente
- Chorrillo

Senior career*
| Years | Team | Apps | (Gls) |
| 2006–2013 | Chorrillo | 145 | (5) |
| 2009 | → Cuervos Negros (loan) | 15 | (0) |
| 2013–2018 | San Francisco | 135 | (5) |
| 2018–2019 | Costa del Este | 22 | (1) |
| 2019 | Universitario | 10 | (0) |
| 2020 | Costa del Este | 10 | (0) |
| 2021–2022 | Sporting San Miguelito | 45 | (1) |
| 2023– | Herrera | 16 | (0) |

International career
| 2007– | Panama | 10 | (0) |
- * Club domestic league appearances and goals as of 4 October 2018

Eric Enrique Vásquez Martínez (born 8 January 1988) is a football defender who currently plays for Herrera FC.

== Club career ==
He joined San Francisco in summer 2013 from Chorrillo. Earlier he had a loan spell abroad with Mexican third division side Cuervos Negros.

== International career ==
He was part of the Panama U-20 squad that participated in the 2007 FIFA World Youth Cup in Canada.

Vásquez made his senior debut for Panama in an August 2007 friendly match against Guatemala and has, as of August 2015, earned a total of 10 caps, scoring no goals. He has represented his country in 1 FIFA World Cup qualification matches.
