= Shemel Louison =

Grenadian footballer

Personal information
- Date of birth: August 9, 1990 (age 36)
- Place of birth: Grenada
- Position: Goalkeeper

Team information
- Current team: Caledonia AIA F.C.

Youth career
- Fontenoy United

Senior career*
| Years | Team | Apps | (Gls) |
| 2010–2012 | Fontenoy United | | |
| 2012–2013 | Anchor Queen's Park Rangers | | |
| 2013– | Caledonia AIA F.C. | | |

International career
| 2011– | Grenada | 5 | (0) |
- * Club domestic league appearances and goals

Shemel Louison (born August 9, 1990) is a Grenadian footballer who plays as a goalkeeper for Caledonia AIA F.C. in Trinidad and Tobago and the Grenada national team.

== Career ==
=== International ===
Louison was called up to the Grenada national team for the 2011 CONCACAF Gold Cup. He started their first game of the tournament, a four-nil loss to Jamaica, and earned positive reviews despite the scoreline.
