= Aaron Moses-Garvey =

Footballer (born 1989)

Personal information
- Date of birth: 6 September 1989 (age 37)
- Place of birth: Birmingham, England
- Position: Striker

Youth career
- ?–2008: Birmingham City

Senior career*
Years	Team	Apps	(Gls)
2008–2009	Birmingham City	0	(0)
2008	→ Hinckley United (loan)	1	(1)
2009	Worcester City	5	(0)
2011–2013	Redditch United		
2013	Stratford Town	1	(0)
2013–2014	Rugby Town	8	(1)
2014	Romulus		
2014	Continental Star	1	(0)
2014–2016	Stratford Town	52	(7)
2016	Continental Star	2	(0)
2016	Coleshill Town	6	(0)
2016–2017	Rugby Town		
2017–2020	Continental Star	36	(3)

International career
2006–2007	Saint Kitts and Nevis U20		
2008–2012	Saint Kitts and Nevis	3	(0)
- * Club domestic league appearances and goals

Aaron Moses-Garvey (born 6 September 1989) is a former professional footballer who played as a striker. He began his career with Birmingham City without making a first-team appearance. Born in England, he represented his father's native country, Saint Kitts and Nevis, at full international level.

== Club career ==
Moses-Garvey was born in Birmingham and joined home-town club Birmingham City as a boy. He has played for their Academy teams and reserve team.

In October 2008 he joined Hinckley United of the Conference North on loan for a month. The player damaged ankle ligaments on the day the deal was completed, so remained at Birmingham for treatment. He eventually made his debut for Hinckley on 15 November, coming on as a first-half substitute to score the second goal in a 2–0 defeat of Harrogate Town. He also played in the FA Trophy defeat by Burscough and in a local cup game before returning to Birmingham at the end of his month's loan.

Birmingham released Moses-Garvey at the end of the 2008–09 season, and after several trial games with Worcester City, he signed for the Conference South club in July 2009. According to manager Richard Dryden, "Aaron's got pace and he's something different from the rest of the forwards. He goes past people with the ball." After playing in all five of Worcester's league games without scoring, Moses-Garvey was released on 24 August.

After playing for Redditch United and Stratford Town, Moses-Garvey joined Rugby Town in September 2013. He left in January 2014 and signed for Romulus, before returning to Stratford later in the year, via a brief stint with Continental Star in the Midland League.

After returning to Continental Star, where he made one start and one substitute appearance, he moved on to Coleshill Town. Registered as 'Aaron Garvey', he made six league appearances, but did not score any goals. He rejoined Rugby in October the same year, but was released at the end of the 2016–17 season following the club's relegation.

Moses-Garvey returned again in the 2017-18 season to Continental Star, making seven league appearances and scoring one goal, and stayed with the club for the following two seasons, establishing himself in the first team during 2018-19 but playing only seven times in 2019-20.

== International career ==
In 2006 Moses-Garvey made his first international appearance for St Kitts and Nevis at under-20 level in the qualifying matches for the 2007 FIFA U-20 World Cup. He qualifies to play for the country because his father Lincoln was born in Saint Kitts. He scored in the 2–1 win over the Dominican Republic which ensured his country's automatic qualification for the CONCACAF qualifying tournament, the first time any St Kitts and Nevis team had reached such an advanced stage of a FIFA competition. They finished third, behind Mexico and Costa Rica, thus failing to qualify for the tournament proper. They did however draw with Jamaica, Moses-Garvey coming close to snatching a late winner. The squad received a ceremonial reception on their return to St Kitts.

In February 2008 Moses-Garvey made his full international debut in the starting eleven in a 2010 World Cup qualifier against Belize, which St Kitts and Nevis lost 3–1.

== Personal life ==
His father, Lincoln Moses, who was born in Saint Kitts, manages non-League side Continental Star, where he used to play.
