= Ramón Núñez =

Honduran footballer (born 1985)

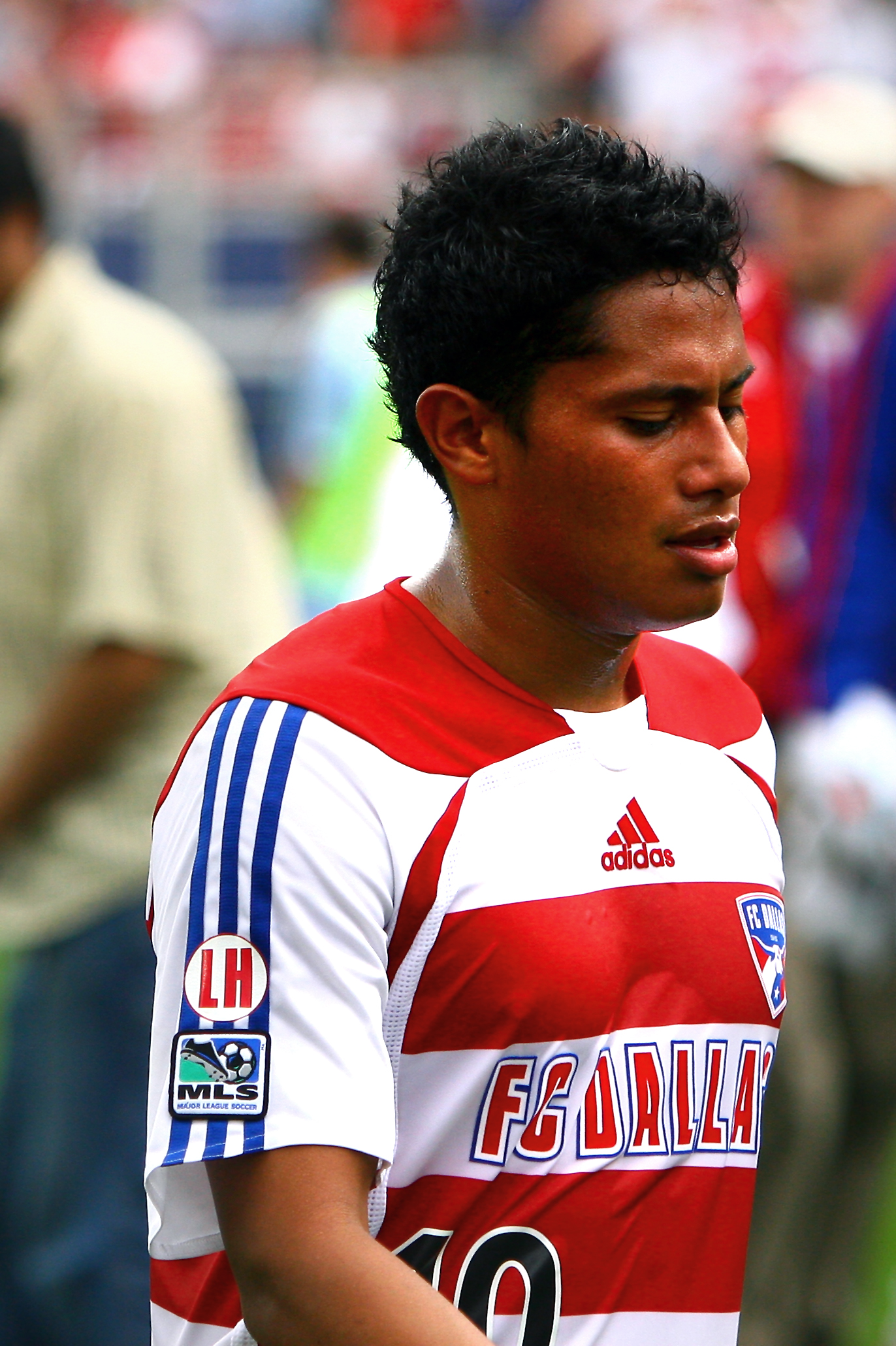
- Núñez playing for FC Dallas in 2007

Personal information
- Full name: Ramón Fernando Núñez Reyes
- Date of birth: 14 November 1985 (age 41)
- Place of birth: Tegucigalpa, Honduras
- Height: 1.69 m (5 ft 7 in)
- Position: Attacking midfielder

College career
Years	Team	Apps	(Gls)
2003	SMU Mustangs		

Senior career*
Years	Team	Apps	(Gls)
2004–2007	FC Dallas	67	(14)
2007	Chivas USA	8	(0)
2008–2009	Olimpia	34	(3)
2009	→ Puebla (loan)	20	(5)
2009	Cruz Azul	11	(0)
2010	Olimpia	11	(5)
2010–2013	Leeds United	21	(1)
2011	→ Scunthorpe United (loan)	8	(3)
2013	FC Dallas	10	(1)
2014	Alajuelense	6	(0)
2014–2016	Real España	28	(4)
2016	Fort Lauderdale Strikers	23	(2)

International career^{‡}
2005	Honduras U20	9	(1)
2007–2008	Honduras U23	13	(3)
2006–2011	Honduras	44	(5)
- * Club domestic league appearances and goals as of 21 January 2022 ‡ National team caps and goals as of 22 May 2020

Ramón Fernando Núñez Reyes (born 14 November 1985) is a Honduran former footballer who played for the Honduras national team. Núñez played primarily as an attacking midfielder. He can also play as a winger or as a second striker. In his homeland he is nicknamed El Principito meaning The Little Prince.

== Club career ==
=== Early career ===
Born in Tegucigalpa, Honduras, Núñez grew up in the United States, coming with his family on his father's investor visa in the early 1990s and graduating from W. T. White High School in Dallas, Texas. He was drafted by the Dallas Burn sixth overall in the 2004 MLS SuperDraft after one season of college soccer at Southern Methodist University for which he was named the Missouri Valley Conference freshman of the year.

=== MLS career ===
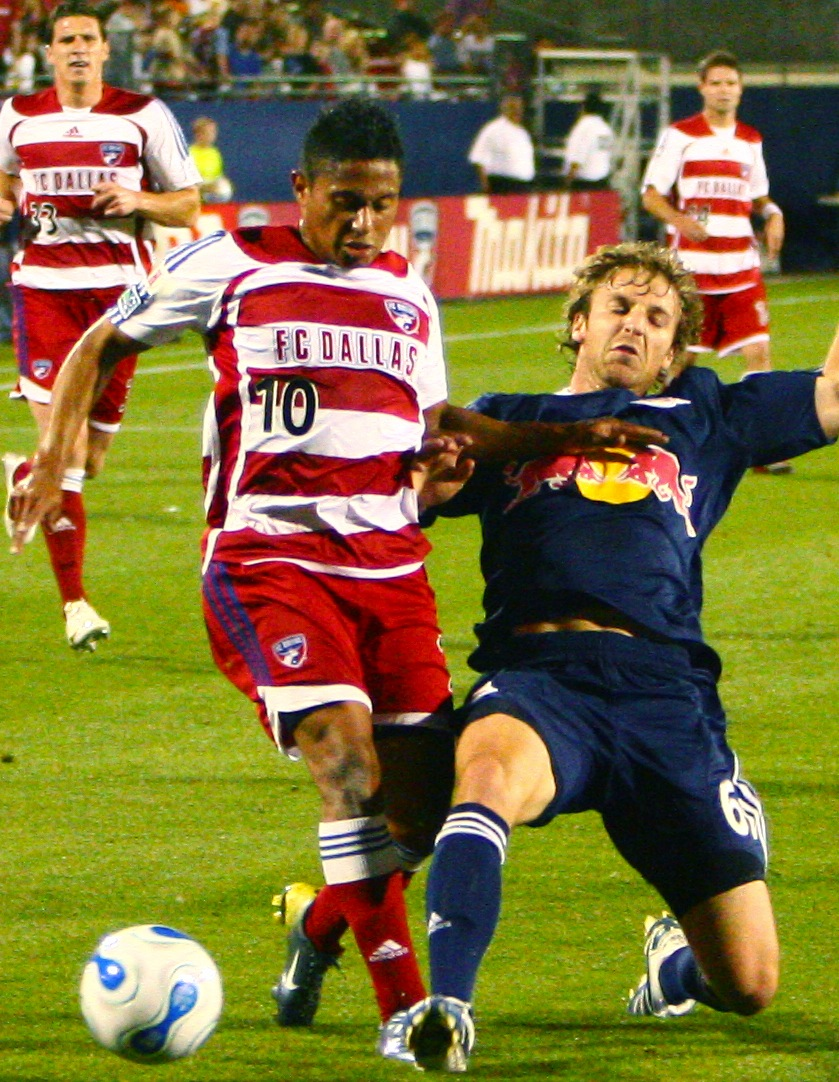
Ramón Núñez (left) playing for FC Dallas

In his first year with the Dallas Burn (which later changed its name to FC Dallas), Núñez saw very limited action, playing a total of 107 minutes in eight games. However, he came on strong at the end of his second season, earning a starting role and finishing with five league goals and three assists. After losing a starting spot, he transferred to Chivas USA in August 2007. He was released on a free transfer at the end of the season.

=== Deportivo Olimpia ===
Soon after, Ramón joined Olimpia of Honduras, where he made 34 appearances, finding the net three times. He was a key player in Olimpia's lineup and played mostly as an attacking midfielder, providing several assists. He was renowned for his extraordinary vision and was instrumental in Los Leones's 2007/08 Clausura triumph, his performances also securing him the player of the season award.

=== Puebla ===
Núñez's excellent form with Olimpia and with the Honduras national football team led to him signing on loan for six months at Mexican Primera División side Puebla. He scored his first goal with Puebla on 18 February 2009 against C.F. Pachuca. He continued to score for 'La Franja' since then and brought his goal tally up to five goals. He also created five assists throughout the season.

=== Cruz Azul ===
His performances on loan for Puebia earned Núñez a move to Cruz Azul for the 2009–2010 season, where he scored two goals in the CONCACAF Champions League. He left the club after six months after not making the same sort of impression he made at Puebia. He decided to return to Honduras so he could get regular games to guarantee his spot in the 2010 Honduras World Cup Squad.

=== C.D. Olimpia ===
Núñez returned to Honduras after leaving Mexico, where he re-joined the nation's most successful side in C.D. Olimpia where he scored 5 goals in 11 games for them. After his 6-month contract ended, Núñez wanted to try his luck in Europe after turning down offers to join Mexican Premier League clubs. After becoming a free agent, he left Olimpia to join Leeds initially on a trial basis before signing a permanent contract.

=== Leeds United ===
In August 2010, Núñez joined English club Leeds United on trial. Núñez scored in his first game for the club in a pre-season friendly victory against Bradford Park Avenue. After impressing manager Simon Grayson during his trial, Núñez's trial period was extended at Leeds by a further week. On 31 August 2010, Núñez signed a professional contract with Leeds United until January 2011, when there is an option to extend the contract even further. On 14 September, in order to gain match fitness, Núñez played 90 minutes in Leeds' 3–1 behind-closed-doors friendly win against Middlesbrough. Núñez put in an impressive performance, scoring a goal and gaining an assist for Mike Grella. Núñez revealed on 23 September, that he was eligible to play for Leeds' first team after going to New York to get a green light on the necessary paperwork.

On 28 September, Núñez was named on the bench for Leeds against Preston North End and against Ipswich Town. He made his debut as a second-half substitute against Cardiff City, as Leeds were comprehensively beaten 4–0 at home. Núñez came on as a second-half substitute against Scunthorpe United. On 1 January 2011, manager Grayson revealed that Núñez might get a new contract despite not playing many games.

On 13 January, Núñez signed a new contract extension with Leeds until the end of the 2010–11 season. The extension also includes the option of a further year on the contract.

Despite the new contract and some impressive performances for Leeds United's reserve team (including all four goals in the 4–1 victory of Lincoln City on 7 March), Núñez struggled for chances in the Leeds United first team, making do with a place on the bench and a regular spot in Leeds' reserves.

Leeds chose to exercise the option on Núñez's contract, and the midfielder has extended his stay at Elland Road for another year.

==== Scunthorpe loan ====
On 24 March, he joined Scunthorpe United on loan in order to get some more experience in English football. On 2 April, Núñez made his debut in the 6–0 thrashing by Norwich at Carrow Road on 2 April 2011, however after a sending off to a Scunthorpe player Núñez was substituted in the first half. He scored his first goal for Scunthorpe against Crystal Palace on 16 April 2011. After impressing in his first month, Núñez's loan was extended until the end of the season. Núñez's impressive form continued when he scored an important equaliser for Scunthorpe against Coventry City on 22 April, after the game manager Alan Knill revealed when he signed Núñez he first spoke to him in pidgin English only for Núñez to speak back to him in his broad American accent. Núñez won a penalty for Scunthorpe against Nottingham Forest, however Scunthorpe lost the match 5-1 and were relegated to League One. Núñez capped a productive loan spell when he scored his third goal of the season in the final match of the season against Portsmouth.

==== Return to Leeds ====
After his spell on loan at Scunthorpe, Núñez signed a new contract at Leeds on 9 May 2011. After playing five games for Honduras over the summer in the CONCACAF Gold Cup, Núñez was given extra time off before returning to Leeds for pre season training. Núñez played a part in Leeds' 2011 pre-season matches scoring against Falkirk when his cross was turned in for an own goal in Leeds 2–0 pre-season victory, following this impressive performance up with a goal against Motherwell. He also scored a late equaliser in the 1–1 draw with Norwegian club Sandefjord Fotball.

Núñez was given the number 20 shirt for Leeds United. He came on as a substitute for Leeds the opening day of the season as they crashed to a 3–1 defeat against Southampton. Núñez scored his first goals for Leeds with a brace against Bradford City in the League Cup 3–2 win on 9 August. Núñez made his first ever league start for Leeds on 16 August against Hull City, and scored his 3rd goal of the season during the match- his first league goal for the club. Núñez scored his 4th and 5th goals of the season against Doncaster Rovers in the League Cup on 23 August. After the sale of Max Gradel, Núñez came into the starting lineup against Crystal Palace on 10 September. Núñez dropped to the bench in place of Andy Keogh against Manchester United, he came on as a second-half substitute and managed to miss one of Leeds' best scoring chances late on in the game.

On 11 October 2011, Núñez signed a new four-year deal with an option of a fifth year with Leeds United. Despite this, he was transfer listed by Neil Warnock at the end of the 2011–12 season. After being put on the transfer list by Leeds, Núñez was linked with a move to Yorkshire Rivals Doncaster Rovers and newly promoted Charlton Athletic. Núñez was not allocated a squad number for the 2012–13 season on 3 August.

Núñez suffered a cruciate ligament injury on 3 September during Leeds United's development squad's victory against Wigan. The injury would rule him out for the season and hinder his chances of a move away from the club.

Núñez had his contract mutually terminated on 29 January 2013.

=== Alajuelense ===
On 11 June 2014, Ramón's signing with Alajuelense was made public. He was released from the team on 12 November due to disciplinary issues.

== International career ==
Núñez was part of the U-20 Honduras national football team at the 2005 World Youth Championship in the Netherlands. In October 2006, Núñez was called up to the senior Honduras national football team for the first time. He made his début for the national side on 9 September 2007, coming in as a substitute in a match against Costa Rica. Ramón made his second and third appearances in September after being called up by Reinaldo Rueda to play in the CONCACAF World Cup Qualifiers. In 2008, Núñez appeared for the U-23 Honduras side at the Men's Olympic Football Tournament in Beijing. Ramón Núñez scored two goals for the Honduras national football team after the team was down one goal against Canada on 6 September 2008 to defeat the squad 2–1. Four days later, he found the net again in Honduras' 2–0 match against Jamaica.

Núñez was named in the Honduras 2010 World Cup squad and was given the number 7 shirt. He played in all three of Honduras' games at the 2010 World Cup in South Africa. Honduras failed to progress beyond the group stages, with Spain and Chile qualifying for the next stage.

After joining Leeds, Núñez was called up for the Honduras national side to play in a friendly against Guatemala Núñez managed to win his 35th cap in the game and managed to create a goal in Honduras' 2–0 win Núñez was called up to play against Panama before Christmas. He was then called up for Honduras to play Costa Rica and Guatemala in the Copa América games. On 15 January, Núñez scored against Costa Rica in injury time to earn Honduras a 1–1 draw. Núñez scored in his second successive game by scoring in Honduras' win against Guatemala. On 23 January, Núñez played in the 2011 Copa Centroamericana final and helped Honduras win the tournament after beating Costa Rica 2–1. Núñez won the award for best player of the tournament when he won the MVP. On 21 March, Núñez was called up into the Honduras squad.

In June 2011, Núñez played for Honduras in the CONCACAF Gold Cup, he was used as an impact player and came on as a substitute in each of the first four games. Nunez denied on his Twitter page that he had critisced the Honduras manager Luis Fernando Suárez after the 1–1 match against Guatemala in the Gold Cup. Honduras played Mexico in the semi-final of the Gold Cup with Núñez making his fifth appearance of the tournament as a substitute. However, Mexico beat Honduras 2–0 in extra time to reach the final.

Núñez revealed in August 2011 he turned down a call-up for Honduras to feature against Venezuela as it meant he would miss Leeds' match against Bradford City. Núñez started against Bradford and scored his first two goals for Leeds.

== Honours and awards ==
Club
C.D. Olimpia

- Liga Profesional de Honduras (1): 2007–08 C

=== Country ===
Honduras

- Copa Centroamericana (1): 2011

Personal

- Olimpia: Player of the season 2007–08
- Southern Methodist University: Missouri Valley Conference 2003 Freshman of the Year
- Honduras: Copa Centroamericana MVP 2011

== Career statistics ==
Club performance			League		Cup		League Cup		Continental		Total	
Season	Club	League	Apps	Goals	Apps	Goals	Apps	Goals	Apps	Goals	Apps	Goals
USA			League		Open Cup		League Cup		North America		Total	
2004	Dallas	Major League Soccer	8	0								
2005	Dallas	Major League Soccer	21	5								
2006	Dallas	Major League Soccer	25	6								
2007	Dallas	Major League Soccer	13	3								
2007	Chivas USA	Major League Soccer	8	0								
Honduras			League		Honduran Cup		League Cup		North America		Total	
2007-08	Olimpia	Liga Nacional	34	3								
2008-09	Olimpia	Liga Nacional	11	5								
Total	USA		75	14								
Total	Honduras		45	8								
Career total												

=== International goals ===
Ramón Núñez: International goals
Goal	Date	Venue	Opponent	Score	Result	Competition
1	6 September 2008	Saputo Stadium, Montreal, Canada	Canada	1 – 1	2 – 1	2010 World Cup qualifiers
2	6 September 2008	Saputo Stadium, Montreal, Canada	Canada	2 – 1	2 – 1	2010 World Cup qualifiers
3	10 September 2008	Estadio Olímpico Metropolitano, San Pedro Sula, Honduras	Jamaica	1 – 0	2 – 0	2010 World Cup qualifiers
4	14 January 2011	Estadio Rommel Fernández, Panama City, Panama	Costa Rica	1 – 1	1 – 1	2011 UNCAF Nations Cup
5	18 January 2011	Estadio Rommel Fernández, Panama City, Panama	Guatemala	1 – 0	3 – 1	2011 UNCAF Nations Cup
