= Félix Rodríguez (Nicaraguan footballer) =

Nicaraguan footballer

Personal information
- Full name: Félix Dorian Rodríguez
- Date of birth: April 27, 1984 (age 42)
- Place of birth: Bluefields, Nicaragua
- Height: 1.72 m (5 ft 8 in)
- Position: Midfielder

Senior career*
Years	Team	Apps	(Gls)
2003–2010	Bluefields		
2010–2016	Real Estelí		
2016–2021	UNAN Managua		

International career^{‡}
2010–2013	Nicaragua	17	(2)
- * Club domestic league appearances and goals as of 02:28, 23 February 2012 (UTC) ‡ National team caps and goals as of 6 January 2014

Félix Dorian Rodríguez (born April 27, 1984) is a retired Nicaraguan professional midfielder who last played for UNAN Managua in the Primera División de Nicaragua.

== Club career ==
He started his career at hometown club Bluefields and joined Estelí in 2010.

== International career ==
Rodríguez made his debut for Nicaragua in a September 2010 friendly match against Guatemala and has, as of December 2013, earned a total of 17 caps, scoring 2 goals. He has represented his country in 4 FIFA World Cup qualification matches and played at the 2011 and 2013 Copa Centroamericana.

=== International goals ===
Scores and results list Honduras' goal tally first.

N.	Date	Venue	Opponent	Score	Result	Competition
1.	21 January 2011	Estadio Rommel Fernández, Panama City, Panama	Guatemala	1–0	1–2	2011 Copa Centroamericana
2.	2 September 2011	Windsor Park, Roseau, Dominica	Dominica	2–0	2-0	Friendly match
