= Daniel Jiménez (Costa Rican footballer) =

Costa Rican footballer (born 1983)

Personal information
- Full name: Daniel Jiménez Briones
- Date of birth: 3 December 1983 (age 42)
- Place of birth: Costa Rica
- Height: 1.72 m (5 ft 7 1/2 in)
- Position: Midfielder

Team information
- Current team: Uruguay de Coronado
- Number: 10

Senior career*
Years	Team	Apps	(Gls)
2001–2003	Santos de Guápiles	0	(0)
2005	Brujas	8	(0)
2006	Santacruceña	14	(4)
2006–2007	Carmelita	24	(4)
2007–2010	Brujas	49	(14)
2010–2011	Cartaginés	28	(2)
2011	Pérez Zeledón	9	(3)
2012	San Carlos	18	(3)
2012	Carmelita	17	(3)
2013	San Carlos	19	(1)
2013	Belén	0	(0)
2014–	Uruguay de Coronado	18	(0)

International career^{‡}
2008–2010	Costa Rica	2	(0)
- * Club domestic league appearances and goals as of 14:56, 27 March 2012 (UTC) ‡ National team caps and goals as of 14:56, 27 March 2012 (UTC)

Daniel Jiménez Briones (born 3 December 1983) is a Costa Rican professional midfielder currently playing for Uruguay de Coronado.

== Club career ==
A much-travelled midfielder, Jiménez played started his career at Santos de Guápiles and played for 8 other clubs in the Costa Rican football league. In summer 2012 he joined Carmelita. but he returned to San Carlos in January 2013.

== International career ==
He made his debut for Costa Rica in a January 2008 friendly match against Iran and his second and final international was a January 2010 friendly match against Argentina.
