= José Miguel Cubero =

Costa Rican footballer (born 1987)

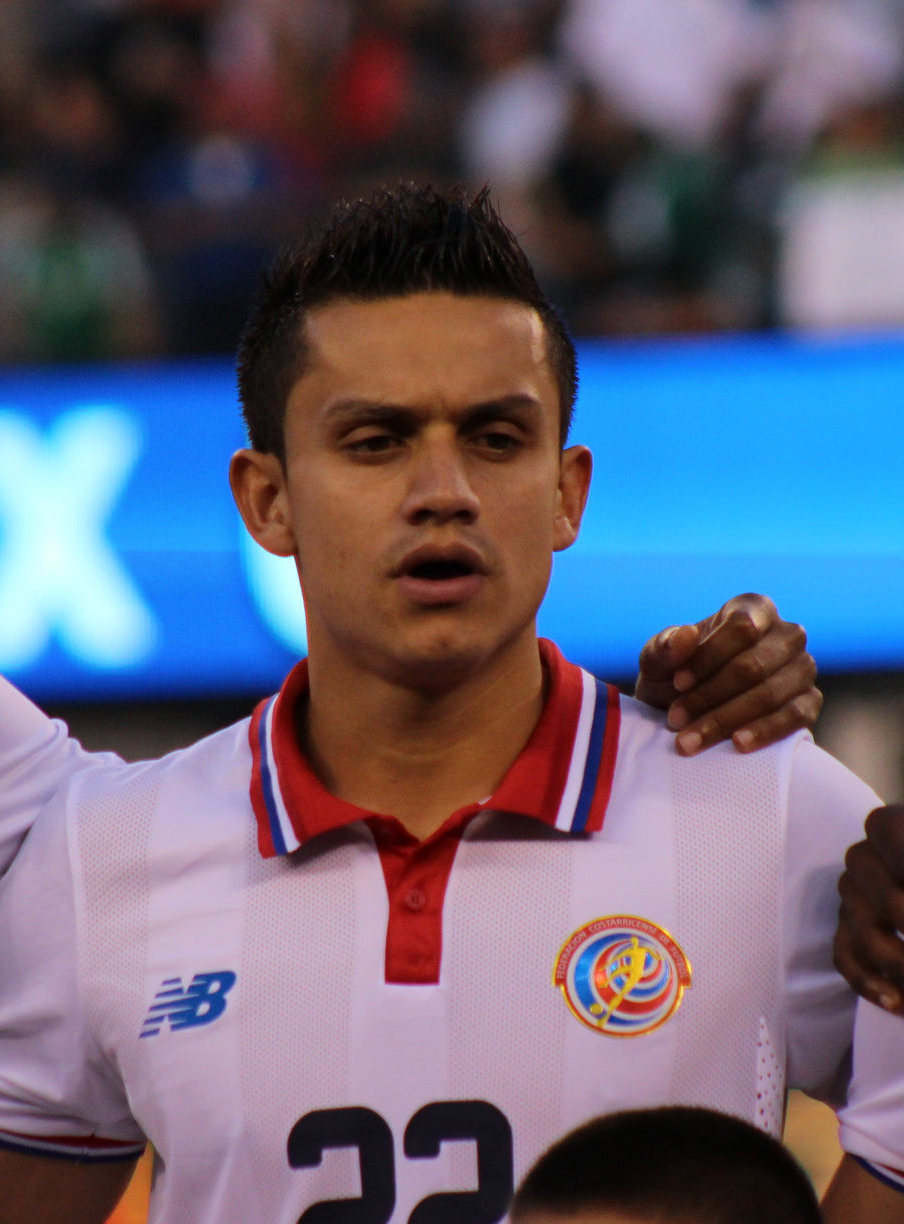
- Cubero with Costa Rica at the 2015 CONCACAF Gold Cup

Personal information
- Full name: José Miguel Cubero Loría
- Date of birth: 14 February 1987 (age 39)
- Place of birth: Sarchí, Alajuela, Costa Rica
- Height: 1.78 m (5 ft 10 in)
- Position: Defensive midfielder

Youth career
- –2006: Herediano

Senior career*
Years	Team	Apps	(Gls)
2006–2014	Herediano	134	(16)
2009	→ Puntarenas (loan)	17	(0)
2014–2016	Blackpool	19	(0)
2016–2017	Herediano	58	(4)
2017	→ Alcoyano (loan)	7	(0)
2018–2023	Alajuelense	161	(11)
2023	Puntarenas	13	(0)
2023–2024	Sporting San José	7	(1)
2024–2025	Sarchí	0	(0)

International career
2006–2007	Costa Rica U20	6	(0)
2010–2019	Costa Rica	54	(2)
- * Club domestic league appearances and goals

José Miguel Cubero Loría (born 14 February 1987), nicknamed El Cucu, is a Costa Rican former professional footballer who played as a defensive midfielder.

Developed in the youth academy of Herediano, Cubero made his professional debut for the club in 2006. Years later, he would be loaned to Puntarenas before returning to Herediano. In 2014, Cubero moved to England and signed for Blackpool. However, he would once again return to Herediano two years later. Cubero was briefly loaned to Alcoyano in Spain, before joining Alajuelense in 2018. He briefly returned to Puntarenas in 2023, before joining Sporting San José later that same year. A year later, Cubero joined Sarchí, the club which he owns, before retiring from professional football in 2025.

After representing the Costa Rica U20 team, Cubero made his official debut for the senior team in 2010. He would represent Costa Rica at the 2011 Copa Centroamericana and the 2011 Copa América. Cubero was also part of the Costa Rica team that reached the quarter-finals of the 2014 FIFA World Cup. He later made appearances for the nation at the 2014 Copa Centroamericana and the 2015 CONCACAF Gold Cup. During Cubero's international career, he made 54 appearances and scored twice.

== Early life ==
Cubero was born on 14 February 1987 in Sarchí in the department of Alajuela. The area where he spent most of his childhood was different from the city, as it is a small town with different customs. His parents and sister supported him from the beginning, and Cubero was clear about his desire to play football professionally, although his mother always recommended that he study to ensure a good future. In order to attend training in Heredia, Cubero had to travel on approximately three buses every day; the journey was very long, and he felt fear and insecure, but he still had the desire to participate in a top-flight club. He went through difficult times as his family had limited resources. Later, Cubero was given the opportunity to join Herediano's youth team Although he studied at a technical school in Sarchí, where time for training was scarce, he chose to study at night. His parents supported him in this decision, and Cubero continued with the sport, as long as he continued with his academic development.

== Club career ==
=== Herediano ===
Cubero made his professional debut for Herediano on 26 March 2006 against Santacruceña and had a spell on loan at Puntarenas in 2009. He signed a three-year contract extension with Herediano in April 2013.

=== Blackpool ===
On 31 July 2014, Cubero signed for Championship side Blackpool on a one-year contract with the option of a further twelve months. He made his Blackpool debut on 27 September in a 3–1 home defeat to Norwich City. In August 2015 it was claimed that Blackpool had snubbed an offer for Cubero from MLS club Seattle Sounders FC and that they had activated a 12-month extension to his contract.

==== Loan to Alcoyano ====
On 31 July 2017, he signed a contract with CD Alcoyano.

On 7 May 2025, Cubero announced his official retirement from football.

== International career ==
=== Youth ===
Cubero participated in the 2007 FIFA U-20 World Cup held in Canada.

=== Senior ===
He made his senior debut for Costa Rica in an August 2010 friendly match against Paraguay. He has represented his country in nine FIFA World Cup qualification matches and played at the 2014 FIFA World Cup, the 2011 Copa Centroamericana as well as at the 2011 Copa América and was a non-playing squad member at the 2011 CONCACAF Gold Cup.

Cubero played 54 matches with Costa Rica, scoring two goals. One of those occurred during a 2014 FIFA World Cup qualification match against El Salvador, which resulted in a crucial victory for the Costa Ricans; Cubero considers it the most important goal of his career.

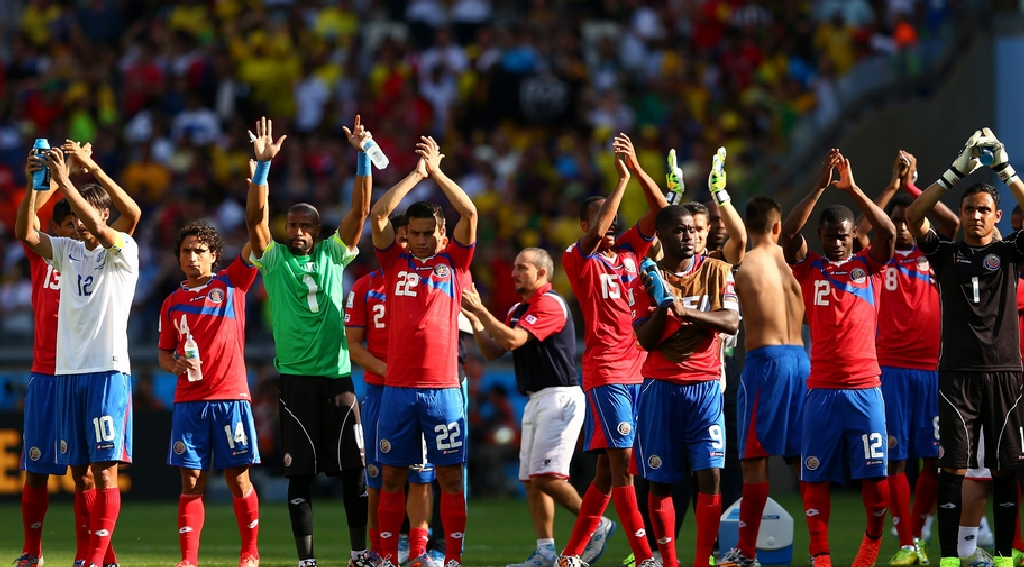
Cubero (number 22) after the end of the group stage of the 2014 FIFA World Cup

After Costa Rica defeated Greece to advance to the 2014 FIFA World Cup quarter-finals, Cubero was spotted crying profusely, while Waylon Francis tried to celebrate with him by yelling "¡Llore conmigo, papi!" ("Cry with me, daddy!"), a phrase now famous in Costa Rica.

== Honours ==
Alajuelense

- Liga FPD: Apertura 2020
- CONCACAF League: 2020
