= Carlos Gallardo (footballer) =

Guatemalan footballer

Personal information
- Full name: Carlos Eduardo Gallardo Nájera
- Date of birth: 8 April 1984 (age 42)
- Place of birth: Guatemala City, Guatemala
- Height: 1.88 m (6 ft 2 in)
- Position: Centre-back

Youth career
- Comunicaciones

Senior career*
Years	Team	Apps	(Gls)
2006–2008	Jalapa	75	(2)
2008–2011	Comunicaciones	110	(4)
2011	USAC	18	(0)
2011–2013	Marquense	58	(2)
2013	Malacateco	22	(1)
2014	Coatepeque	23	(0)
2014–2016	Comunicaciones	60	(1)
2016–2019	Guastatoya	135	(3)
2019–2022	Municipal	85	(3)
2022–2023	Barberena	0	(0)

International career
2008–2020	Guatemala	69	(4)
- * Club domestic league appearances and goals

Carlos Eduardo Gallardo Nájera (born 8 April 1984) is a Guatemalan former professional footballer who plays as a defender.

== Club career ==
A tall defender, Gallardo played for Comunicaciones before joining Deportivo Jalapa in 2007. He returned to the Cremas for the 2008/2009 Apertura.

== International career ==
He made his debut for Guatemala in an April 2008 friendly match against Haiti. He has earned 11 caps at the start of February 2010, including 6 qualifying matches for the 2010 FIFA World Cup.

== Career statistics ==
=== International goals ===
Scores and results list. Guatemala's goal tally first.

No.	Date	Venue	Opponent	Score	Result	Competition
1.	6 September 2008	Hasely Crawford Stadium, Port of Spain, Trinidad and Tobago	Trinidad and Tobago	1–1	1–1	2010 FIFA World Cup qualification
2.	13 June 2011	Red Bull Arena, Harrison, United States	Grenada	4–0	4–0	2011 CONCACAF Gold Cup
3.	11 October 2011	Estadio Mateo Flores, Guatemala City, Guatemala	Belize	1–0	3–1	2014 FIFA World Cup qualification
4.	16 November 2019	Estadio Mateo Flores, Guatemala City, Guatemala	Puerto Rico	1–0	5–0	2019–20 CONCACAF Nations League C

== Honours ==
Jalapa

- Liga Nacional de Guatemala: Apertura 2007

Comunicaciones

- Liga Nacional de Guatemala: Apertura 2010, Clausura 2011, Clausura 2015

Guastatoya

- Liga Nacional de Guatemala: Clausura 2018, Apertura 2018

Municipal

- Liga Nacional de Guatemala: Apertura 2019
