= Marco Ciani =

Guatemalan footballer

Personal information
- Full name: Marco Tulio Ciani Barillas
- Date of birth: 7 March 1987 (age 39)
- Place of birth: Guatemala City, Guatemala
- Height: 1.72 m (5 ft 8 in)
- Position: Midfielder

Senior career*
Years	Team	Apps	(Gls)
2007–2010	Comunicaciones	47	(3)
2010–2011	Xelajú	25	(1)
2011–2012	Comunicaciones	42	(8)
2012	Universidad SC	17	(5)
2012–2014	Municipal	69	(8)
2014	San Marcos	7	(0)
2015	Municipal	22	(3)
2017–2018	Aurora FC		
2018	Chimaltenango		
2019	Deportivo Xinabajul		
2021	Deportivo Chiantla		
2022	Agua Blanca		

International career
2010–2012	Guatemala	18	(0)
- * Club domestic league appearances and goals

Marco Tulio Ciani Barillas (born March 7, 1987, in Guatemala City, Guatemala) is a Guatemalan footballer who plays as a midfielder.

== Club career ==
Ciani was signed by SM Arica in June 2014. He made his debut on July 19 in the season opener against Colo Colo, coming off the bench for Kevin Harbottle.

In March 2022, Ciani joined CSD Agua Blanca.

== Career statistics ==
Country			Domestic				International		Total	
Chile			League		Cup		Cup		Total	
League	Club	Season	Apps	Goals	Apps	Goals	Apps	Goals	Apps	Goals
Campeonato Nacional Scotiabank	San Marcos de Arica	2014-15	7	0	3	0	0	0	10	0
Total	Chile		7	0	3	0	0	0	10	0
