= Cristian Noriega =

Guatemalan footballer

Personal information
- Full name: Cristian Jafeth Noriega Santizo
- Date of birth: 20 March 1987 (age 39)
- Place of birth: Guatemala City, Guatemala
- Height: 1.83 m (6 ft 0 in)
- Position: Defender

Youth career
- 2004–2007: Municipal

Senior career*
Years	Team	Apps	(Gls)
2007–2013	Municipal	158	(2)
2013–2014	FAS		
2014–2015	Municipal		

International career
2008–2014	Guatemala	36	(0)
- * Club domestic league appearances and goals

Cristian Jafeth Noriega Santizo (born 20 March 1987) is a Guatemalan former professional footballer who played as a defender.

== Club career ==
Noriega came through the youth ranks at Municipal to make his debut in 2007.

== International career ==
Noriega made his debut for the senior Guatemala national team in a February 2008 friendly match against Argentina, but the game was not official by FIFA, so, his first official one came against Panama in a June 2008 friendly. He made 14 appearances at the start of January 2010, including 3 qualifying matches for the 2010 FIFA World Cup.
