= Mike Adams (football manager) =

English football manager

Personal information
- Full name: M
- Date of birth: 1959 (age 66–67)

Youth career
- Years: Team
- Chelsea

Managerial career
- 2011–2012: Grenada

Mike Adams (born 1959) is a former footballer and the former manager of the Grenada national football team.

He began his playing career at Chelsea but it was cut short at the age of 21 due to a serious knee injury.

He was appointed as the national team's manager in February 2011.

Prior to this he has been used as a consultant to the national team, he was appointed in January 2004, by the Grenadian Football Association. He attracted players such as Delroy Facey to play for the Spiceboyz. Adams managed Grenada at the 2005 Caribbean Cup, guiding the team out of the group stage before being knocked out by a second-round defeat by St Vincent and the Grenadines.
