= 2011 Copa Centroamericana =

- 2011 Copa Centroamericana logo

Tournament details
- Host country: Panama
- Dates: January 14–23
- Teams: 7 (from 1 sub-confederation)
- Venue(s): 1 (in 1 host city)

Final positions
- Champions: Honduras (3rd title)
- Runners-up: Costa Rica
- Third place: Panama
- Fourth place: El Salvador

Tournament statistics
- Matches played: 14
- Goals scored: 35 (2.5 per match)
- Attendance: 92,000 (6,571 per match)
- Top scorer(s): (Costa Rica) Marco Ureña (El Salvador) Rafael Burgos (3 goals each)

The 2011 Copa Centroamericana (English: 2011 Central American Cup) was the eleventh edition of Copa Centroamericana (formerly known as the UNCAF Nations Cup), an international football championship for national teams affiliated with the Central American Football Union (UNCAF) of the CONCACAF region. It took place in Panama from January 14 to January 23, 2011. It was the second time for Panama to host the tournament. On January 23, 2011 Honduras won the cup by defeating Costa Rica 2-1 in the final. The top five teams from this tournament qualified for the 2011 CONCACAF Gold Cup. The group stage draw was conducted on September 2, 2010 in Panama City.

== Participating nations ==
All seven UNCAF members participated in the tournament:

- Belize
- Costa Rica
- El Salvador
- Guatemala
- Honduras
- Nicaragua
- Panama (Hosts) and (Defending Champions)

== Venue ==
All matches were played at Estadio Rommel Fernández in Panama City.

2011 Copa Centroamericana is located in Panama	Panama City
2011 Copa Centroamericana is located in Panama	Estadio Rommel Fernández
2011 Copa Centroamericana is located in Panama	Capacity: 32,000

== Group stage ==
Tiebreakers

1. Greater number of points in matches between the tied teams.
2. Greater goal difference in matches between the tied teams (if more than two teams finish equal on points).
3. Greater number of goals scored in matches among the tied teams (if more than two teams finish equal on points).
4. Greater goal difference in all group matches.
5. Greater number of goals scored in all group matches.
6. Drawing of lots.

All times are in local, Panama Time (UTC−05:00).

Key to colors in group tables
Teams that advanced to the semifinals
Teams that advanced to the fifth place match

=== Group A ===
Team	Pld	W	D	L	GF	GA	GD	Pts
Panama	3	3	0	0	6	0	+6	9
El Salvador	3	2	0	1	7	4	+3	6
Nicaragua	3	0	1	2	1	5	−4	1
Belize	3	0	1	2	3	8	−5	1

14 January 2011
17:00

El Salvador	2–0	Nicaragua
Alas 70'; Burgos 75'	Report

Estadio Rommel Fernández, Panama City
Attendance: 2,000
Referee: Wálter Quesada (Costa Rica)
14 January 2011
21:00

Panama	2–0	Belize
Aguilar 22'; Brown 28'	Report

Estadio Rommel Fernández, Panama City
Attendance: 10,000
Referee: Jose Pineda (Honduras)

16 January 2011
15:00

Belize	2–5	El Salvador
Smith 45+1' (pen.); O. Jiménez 76'	Report	Romero 15'; Burgos 24', 46'; Alas 54'; Umanzor 59'

Estadio Rommel Fernández, Panama City
Attendance: 1,500
Referee: Ricardo Cerdas (Costa Rica)
16 January 2011
19:00

Panama	2–0	Nicaragua
Cooper 15'; Rentería 80'	Report

Estadio Rommel Fernández, Panama City
Attendance: 6,000
Referee: Walter Lopez (Guatemala)

18 January 2011
17:00

Nicaragua	1–1	Belize
Espinoza 10' (pen.)	Report	D. Jiménez 81'

Estadio Rommel Fernández, Panama City
Attendance: 20,000
Referee: Marcos Brea (Cuba)
18 January 2011
21:00

Panama	2–0	El Salvador
Aguilar 25'; Cooper 79'	Report

Estadio Rommel Fernández, Panama City
Attendance: 20,000
Referee: Roberto García (Mexico)

=== Group B ===
Team	Pld	W	D	L	GF	GA	GD	Pts
Honduras	2	1	1	0	4	2	+2	4
Costa Rica	2	1	1	0	3	1	+2	4
Guatemala	2	0	0	2	1	5	−4	0

14 January 2011
19:00

Costa Rica	1–1	Honduras
V. Núñez 42'	Report	R. Núñez 90+1'

Estadio Rommel Fernández, Panama City
Attendance: 6,000
Referee: Roberto García (Mexico)

16 January 2011
17:00

Guatemala	0–2	Costa Rica
	Report	Ureña 47', 82'

Estadio Rommel Fernández, Panama City
Attendance: 2,000
Referee: Roberto Moreno (Panama)

18 January 2011
19:00

Honduras	3–1	Guatemala
Núñez 13'; Claros 42', 89'	Report	Ramírez 24'

Estadio Rommel Fernández, Panama City
Attendance: 500
Referee: Joel Aguilar (El Salvador)

== Final stage ==
Semi-finals
Honduras	2
El Salvador	0
Panama	1 (2)
Costa Rica (pen)	1 (4)

Final
Honduras	2
Costa Rica	1
Third place
El Salvador	0 (4)
Panama (pen)	0 (5)

Fifth place
Nicaragua	1
Guatemala	2

Note: No extra time is played.

=== Fifth place match ===
21 January 2011
16:00

Nicaragua	1–2	Guatemala
Rodríguez 23'	Report	G. Ruiz 45+1'; León 66'

Estadio Rommel Fernández, Panama City
Attendance: 5,000
Referee: Roberto García (Mexico)

=== Semifinals ===
21 January 2011
18:30

Honduras	2–0	El Salvador
Leverón 77'; Chávez 90+3'	Report

Estadio Rommel Fernández, Panama City
Attendance: 5,000
Referee: Wálter Quesada (Costa Rica)

21 January 2011
21:00

Panama	1–1	Costa Rica
Pérez 75'	Report	Borges 67'
Penalties
Pérez (penalty missed); G. Torres (penalty scored); Gómez (penalty scored); Baloy (penalty missed)	2–4	(penalty scored) Borges; (penalty missed) Núñez; (penalty scored) Ureña; (penalty scored) Marshall; (penalty scored) Miller

Estadio Rommel Fernández, Panama City
Attendance: 10,000
Referee: Joel Aguilar (El Salvador)

=== Third place match ===
23 January 2011
15:30

El Salvador	0–0	Panama
	Report
Penalties
Alvarez (penalty missed); J. Alas (penalty scored); Blanco (penalty scored); Portillo (penalty scored); D. Alas (penalty scored)	4–5	(penalty scored) Brown; (penalty scored) Torres; (penalty scored) Bonaga; (penalty scored) Davis; (penalty scored) Henríquez

Estadio Rommel Fernández, Panama City
Attendance: 2,000
Referee: Benigno Pineda (Honduras)

=== Final ===
23 January 2011
18:00

Honduras	2–1	Costa Rica
W. Martínez 8'; E. Martínez 53'	Report	Ureña 73'

Estadio Rommel Fernández, Panama City
Attendance: 2,000
Referee: Walter Lopez (Guatemala)

Honduras	Costa Rica

HONDURAS:
GK	23	Noel Valladares
DF	16	Mauricio Sabillón	(yellow card) 29'	(substituted off) 78'
DF	14	Juan Carlos García
DF	2	Osman Chávez
DF	6	Johnny Leverón	(yellow card) 90'
MF	10	Ramón Núñez	(substituted off) 46'
MF	8	Jorge Claros
MF	21	Mario Martínez
MF	13	Alfredo Mejía
MF	7	Emil Martínez	(yellow card) 36'	(substituted off) 63'
FW	15	Walter Martínez
Substitutions:
MF	3	Mariano Acevedo	(substituted in) 46'
MF	19	Marvin Chávez	(substituted in) 63'
DF	4	Johnny Palacios	(substituted in) 78'	(yellow card) 79'
Manager:
(Mexico) Juan de Dios Castillo

COSTA RICA:
GK	23	Donny Grant
DF	19	Roy Miller
DF	4	David Myrie
DF	6	Heiner Mora
DF	20	Dennis Marshall
DF	3	Darío Delgado	(yellow card) 51' (red card) 62'
MF	5	Celso Borges
MF	22	Allen Guevara	(substituted off) 46'
MF	14	José Miguel Cubero	(substituted off) 54'
FW	17	Josué Martínez	(substituted off) 66'
FW	7	Marco Ureña	(yellow card) 69'
Substitutions:
FW	11	César Elizondo	(substituted in) 46'
FW	10	Randall Brenes	(substituted in) 54'
MF	12	Cristian Gamboa	(substituted in) 66'
Manager:
(Argentina) Ricardo La Volpe

2011 Copa
Centroamericana champions

Honduras
Third title

== Statistics ==
=== Goalscorers ===
3 goals

(El Salvador) Rafael Burgos
(Costa Rica) Marco Ureña

2 goals

(El Salvador) Jaime Alas
(Panama) Armando Cooper

(Honduras) Jorge Claros
(Honduras) Ramón Núñez

(Panama) Edwin Aguilar

1 goal

(Belize) Daniel Jiménez
(Belize) Orlando Jiménez
(Belize) Elroy Smith
(Costa Rica) Celso Borges
(Costa Rica) Victor Núñez
(El Salvador) Osael Romero
(El Salvador) Deris Umanzor

(Guatemala) Manuel León
(Guatemala) Guillermo Ramírez
(Guatemala) Gregory Ruiz
(Honduras) Marvin Chávez
(Honduras) Johnny Leverón
(Honduras) Emil Martínez
(Honduras) Walter Martínez

(Nicaragua) Denis Espinoza
(Nicaragua) Félix Rodríguez
(Panama) Roberto Brown
(Panama) Blas Pérez
(Panama) Luis Rentería

=== Awards ===
- Golden Ball: Ramón Núñez (Honduras)
- Golden Boot: Rafael Burgos (El Salvador) & Marco Ureña (Costa Rica)
