= Manuel León =

Guatemalan footballer

Manuel León (born 23 September 1987) is a Guatemalan football midfielder.

He was part of the Guatemala national football team for the 2011 CONCACAF Gold Cup, and played in two matches.
