= Costa Rica national football team results (2010–2019) =

Below are listed all the matches played by the Costa Rica national football team between 2010 and 2019.

== Overview ==
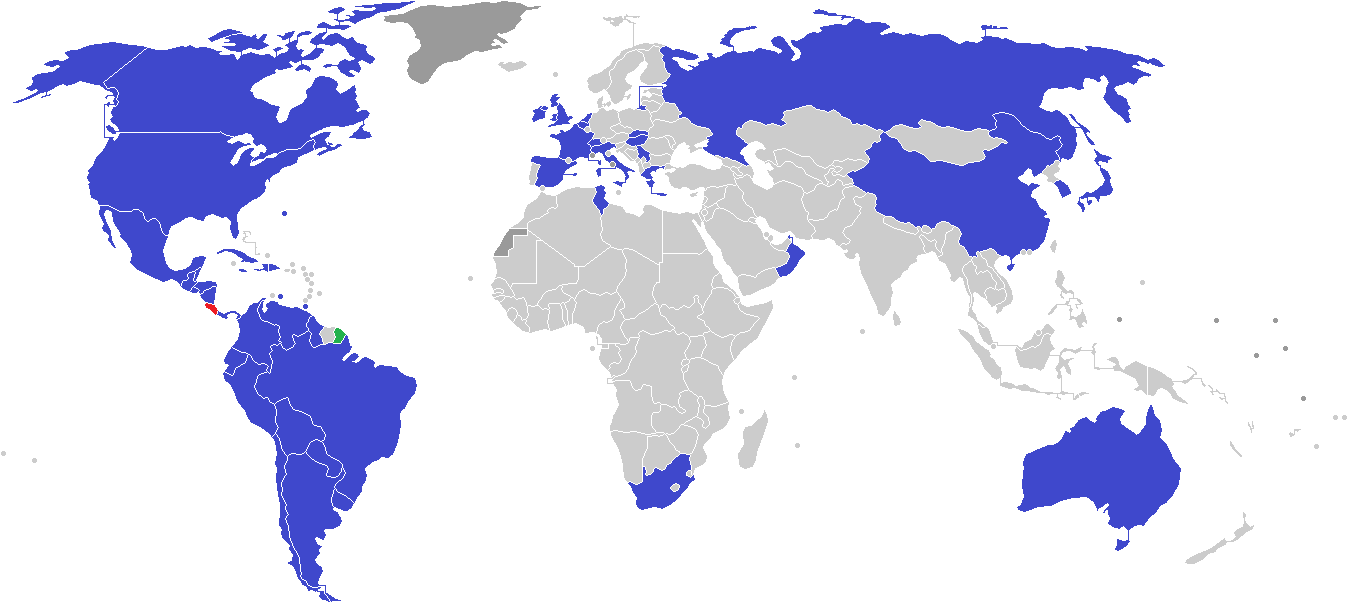
Map of the countries that have played at least one match against Costa Rica so far in the decade: Costa Rica Teams that have already faced Costa Rica Teams that are scheduled to face Costa Rica in the future Non-FIFA team that has faced Costa Rica

=== By team ===
Team	Pld	W	D	L	GF	GA
Argentina	3	0	1	2	2	6
Australia	1	0	0	1	0	1
Belgium	1	0	0	1	1	4
Belize	3	3	0	0	5	0
Bolivia	2	1	1	0	3	1
Brazil	3	0	0	3	0	4
Canada	3	1	2	0	2	1
Chile	1	0	0	1	0	4
China	1	0	1	0	2	2
Colombia	2	1	0	1	3	3
Cuba	3	2	1	0	9	1
Dominican Republic	1	1	0	0	4	0
Ecuador	2	0	0	2	0	6
El Salvador	7	3	4	0	8	5
England	2	0	1	1	0	2
France	1	0	0	1	1	2
French Guiana	1	1	0	0	3	0
Greece	1	0	1	0	1	1
Guatemala	5	3	1	1	8	5
Guyana	2	2	0	0	11	0
Haiti	2	2	0	0	2	0
Honduras	12	3	6	3	10	10
Hungary	1	0	0	1	0	1
Italy	1	1	0	0	1	0
Jamaica	8	2	5	1	9	5
Japan	2	0	0	2	1	6
Mexico	9	1	3	5	6	14
Netherlands	1	0	1	0	0	0
Nicaragua	4	3	1	0	6	0
Northern Ireland	1	1	0	0	3	0
Oman	1	1	0	0	4	3
Panama	13	4	5	4	17	16
Paraguay	4	1	2	1	2	3
Peru	2	0	0	2	0	3
Republic of Ireland	1	0	1	0	1	1
Russia	1	1	0	0	4	3
Scotland	1	1	0	0	1	0
Serbia	1	0	0	1	0	1
Slovakia	1	0	0	1	0	3
South Africa	1	0	0	1	0	1
South Korea	2	1	0	1	3	2
Spain	3	0	1	2	3	9
Switzerland	2	1	1	0	3	2
Trinidad and Tobago	2	2	0	0	4	1
Tunisia	1	0	0	1	0	1
United States	9	5	0	4	11	9
Uruguay	3	2	1	0	7	4
Venezuela	4	2	1	1	6	4
Wales	1	1	0	0	1	0

=== By confederation ===
Confederation	TF	Pld	W	D	L	GF	GA
AFC	5	6	2	1	3	10	11
CAF	2	2	0	0	2	0	2
CONCACAF	16	84	38	28	18	115	67
CONMEBOL	10	26	7	6	13	23	38
UEFA	16	20	6	6	8	20	29
Totals	49	138	53	41	44	168	147

== 2010 ==
26 January Friendly	Argentina	3–2	Costa Rica	San Juan, Argentina
	Sosa 10'; Burdisso 37'; Jara 79'		20' Barrantes; 76' Madrigal	Stadium: Estadio Ingeniero Hilario Sánchez, Attendance: 16,000; Referee: Carlos Amarilla (Paraguay)

26 May Friendly	France	2–1	Costa Rica	Lens, France
	Sequeira 22' (o.g.); Valbuena 83'		Hernández 11'	Stadium: Stade Félix-Bollaert; Attendance: 40,000; Referee: Vladislav Bezborodov (Russia)

1 June Friendly	Switzerland	0–1	Costa Rica	Sion, Switzerland
			Parks 57'	Stadium: Stade Tourbillon; Attendance: 11,300; Referee: Anthony Buttimer (Republic of Ireland)

5 June Friendly	Slovakia	3–0	Costa Rica	Bratislava, Slovakia
	Sequeira 16' (o.g.); Vittek 46'; Šesták 86' (pen.)			Stadium: Štadión Pasienky; Attendance: 12,000; Referee: Stefan Meßner (Austria)

11 August Friendly	Paraguay	2–0	Costa Rica	Asunción, Paraguay
	Vera 8'; Riveros 64'			Stadium: Estadio Defensores del Chaco; Attendance: 22,000; Referee: Federico Beligoy (Argentina)

4 September Friendly	Panama	2–2	Costa Rica	Panama City, Panama
	Tejada 27', 38'		Barrantes 8'; Saborío 52'	Stadium: Estadio Rommel Fernández; Attendance: 23,005; Referee: Paul Delgadillo (Mexico)

7 September Friendly	Jamaica	1–0	Costa Rica	Kingston, Jamaica
	Johnson 66'			Stadium: Independence Park; Referee: Neal Brizan (Trinidad and Tobago)

8 October Friendly	Peru	2–0	Costa Rica	Lima, Peru
	Ramírez 3'; Rengifo 6'			Stadium: Estadio Alejandro Villanueva; Attendance: 15,000; Referee: Omar Ponce (Ecuador)

12 October Friendly	Costa Rica	2–1	El Salvador	Ciudad Quesada, Costa Rica
	J. Sánchez 10'; J. Martínez 88'		Burgos 53'	Stadium: Estadio Carlos Ugalde Álvarez; Attendance: 4,000; Referee: Luis Rodríguez (Panama)

17 November Friendly	Costa Rica	0–0	Jamaica	Fort Lauderdale, United States
				Stadium: Lockhart Stadium; Attendance: 4,000; Referee: Chris Renso (United States)

=== Statistics ===
Competition	GP	W	D	L	GF	GA
International Friendly	10	2	2	6	8	16

Player	Goals
Michael Barrantes	2
Diego Madrigal	1
Carlos Hernández	1
Winston Parks	1
Álvaro Saborío	1
José Sánchez	1
Josué Martínez	1

== 2011 ==
The year was marked by the inauguration of the new national stadium in San José in late March. Since then, the stadium has served as the home stadium of the team. To encourage the fans to go to the stadium, the Costa Rican Football Federation made a heavy investment by organizing friendlies against FIFA World Cup winners Argentina, Brazil and the then most recent champions Spain.

Tragedy also hit the national team during 2011, when defender Dennis Marshall (along with his wife) died in a car accident. Marshall died just five days after scoring his only international goal in a CONCACAF Gold Cup match against Honduras.

Overall, 2011 showed lackluster results for the national team. Failures to overcome Honduras at the Copa Centroamericana final and the Gold Cup quarter-finals, along with a poor performance at the Copa América prompted the dismissal of Ricardo La Volpe. After the departure of La Volpe, Rónald González served as interim manager for the team until the arrival of Jorge Luis Pinto in September.

14 January Centroamericana GS	Costa Rica	1–1	Honduras	Panama City, Panama
18:00 (UTC−5)	V. Núñez 42'		90' R. Núñez	Stadium: Estadio Rommel Fernández; Attendance: 6,000; Referee: Roberto García (Mexico)

16 January Centroamericana GS	Guatemala	0–2	Costa Rica	Panama City, Panama
16:00 (UTC−5)			48', 82' Ureña	Stadium: Estadio Rommel Fernández; Attendance: 1,500; Referee: Roberto Moreno (Panama)

21 January Centroamericana SF	Panama	1–1 (2–4 p)	Costa Rica	Panama City, Panama
20:00 (UTC−5)	Borges 67'		76' Pérez	Stadium: Estadio Rommel Fernández; Attendance: 10,000; Referee: Joel Aguilar (El Salvador)

23 January Centroamericana F	Honduras	2–1	Costa Rica	Panama City, Panama
	W. Martínez 8'; E. Martínez 52'		73' Ureña	Stadium: Estadio Rommel Fernández; Attendance: 2,000; Referee: Walter López (Guatemala)

9 February Friendly	Venezuela	2–2	Costa Rica	Puerto la Cruz, Venezuela
18:30 (UTC−4)	Rondón 24', 80'		6' Oviedo; 59' Ureña	Stadium: Estadio Olímpico José Antonio Anzoátegui; Referee: Henry Gambetta (Peru)

26 March Friendly	Costa Rica	2–2	China	San José, Costa Rica
20:20 (UTC−6)	Saborío 38'; Brenes 45'		45', 90+2' Gao Lin	Stadium: Estadio Nacional; Referee: Roberto Moreno (Panama)

29 March Friendly	Costa Rica	0–0	Argentina	San José, Costa Rica
20:00 (UTC−6)				Stadium: Estadio Nacional; Referee: Marco Rodríguez (Mexico)

5 June Gold Cup GS	Costa Rica	5–0	Cuba	Arlington, United States
17:00 (UTC−5)	Ureña 6', 46'; Saborío 41'; Mora 47'; Campbell 71'			Stadium: AT&T Stadium; Attendance: 80,108; Referee: Roberto Moreno (Panama)

9 June Gold Cup GS	Costa Rica	1–1	El Salvador	Charlotte, United States
19:00 (UTC−4)	Brenes 95'		45' Zelaya	Stadium: Bank of America Stadium; Attendance: 46,021; Referee: Jair Marrufo (United States)

12 June Gold Cup GS	Mexico	4–1	Costa Rica	Chicago, United States
19:00 (UTC−5)	Márquez 17'; Guardado 19', 26'; Barrera 38'		69' Ureña	Stadium: Soldier Field; Attendance: 61,500; Referee: Roberto Moreno (Panama)

18 June Gold Cup QF	Costa Rica	1–1 (2–4 p)	Honduras	East Rutherford, United States
17:00 (UTC−4)	Marshall 56'		49' Bengtson	Stadium: New Meadowlands Stadium; Attendance: 78,807; Referee: Roberto Moreno (Panama)

2 July Copa América GS	Colombia	1–0	Costa Rica	San Salvador de Jujuy, Argentina
15:30 (UTC−3)	Ramos 44'			Stadium: Estadio 23 de Agosto; Referee: Enrique Osses (Chile)

7 July Copa América GS	Bolivia	0–2	Costa Rica	San Salvador de Jujuy, Argentina
19:15 (UTC−3)			59' Martínez; 79' Campbell	Stadium: Estadio 23 de Agosto; Referee: Carlos Vera (Ecuador)

11 July Copa América GS	Argentina	3–0	Costa Rica	Córdoba, Argentina
21:45 (UTC−3)	Agüero 45+1', 52'; Di María 63'			Stadium: Estadio Mario Alberto Kempes; Referee: Víctor Rivera (Peru)

10 August Friendly	Costa Rica	0–2	Ecuador	San José, Costa Rica
20:10 (UTC−6)			53' Suárez; 66' Méndez	Stadium: Estadio Nacional; Referee: Wilmar Roldán (Colombia)

2 September Friendly	United States	0–1	Costa Rica	Carson, United States
21:00 (UTC−8)			66' Wallace	Stadium: Home Depot Center; Referee: Jose Molina (Argentina)

6 September Friendly	Ecuador	4–0	Costa Rica	Quito, Ecuador
15:00 (UTC−5)	Suárez 21'; Ayoví 28'; Castillo 58'; Benítez 75'			Stadium: Estadio Olímpico Atahualpa; Referee: Wilmar Roldán (Colombia)

7 October Friendly	Costa Rica	0–1	Brazil	San José, Costa Rica
20:00 (UTC−6)			60' Neymar	Stadium: Estadio Nacional; Referee: Walter López (Guatemala)

11 November Friendly	Panama	2–0	Costa Rica	Panama City, Panama
20:00 (UTC−5)	Gómez 26' (pen.); Pérez 28'			Stadium: Estadio Rommel Fernández; Referee: Roberto García (Mexico)

15 November Friendly	Costa Rica	2–2	Spain	San José, Costa Rica
15:05 (UTC−6)	Brenes 31'; Campbell 42'		83' Silva; 90+3' Villa	Stadium: Estadio Nacional; Attendance: 30,000; Referee: Mauricio Navarro (Canada)

11 December Friendly	Cuba	1–1	Costa Rica	Havana, Cuba
20:00 (UTC−5)	Cordovés 57' (pen.)		90+2' Cunningham	Stadium: Estadio Pedro Marrero; Referee: Walter López (Guatemala)

22 December Friendly	Venezuela	0–2	Costa Rica	Barquisimeto, Venezuela
17:35 (UTC−4)			41' Wallace; 53' Cubero	Stadium: Estadio Metropolitano de Fútbol de Lara; Attendance: 35,000; Referee: Rudolph Angela (Aruba)

=== Statistics ===
Coach(es)

#	Nat.	Coach	Number of matches
1	(Argentina)	Ricardo La Volpe	15
2	(Costa Rica)	Rónald González	2
3	(Colombia)	Jorge Luis Pinto	5

General statistics

Competition	GP	W	D	L	GF	GA
Copa Centroamericana	4	1	2	1	5	4
Gold Cup	4	1	2	1	8	6
Copa América	3	1	0	2	2	4
Friendlies	11	2	5	4	10	16
Total	22	5	9	8	25	30

==== Goalscorers ====
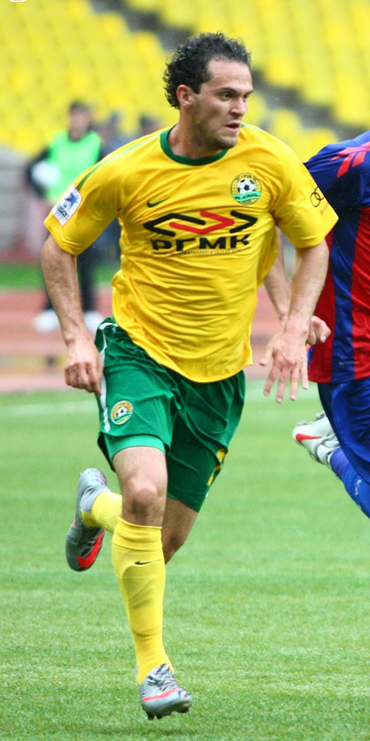
Marco Ureña was the top goalscorer for Costa Rica in 2011, scoring seven goals

7 goals

- Marco Ureña

3 goals

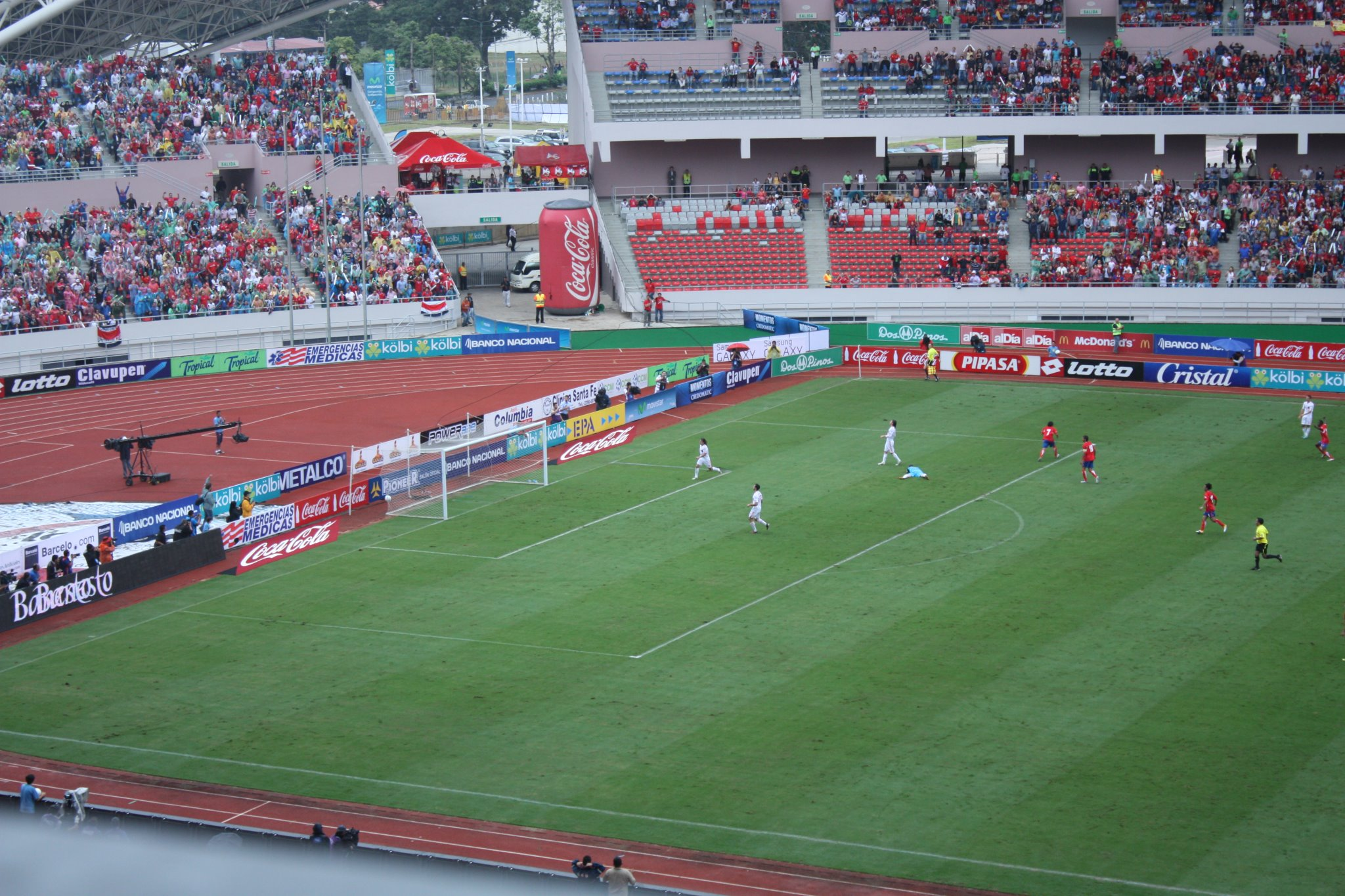
Randall Brenes scoring against Spain in November

- Randall Brenes
- Joel Campbell

2 goals

- Álvaro Saborío
- Rodney Wallace

1 goal

- Celso Borges
- José Miguel Cubero
- Kenny Cunningham
- Dennis Marshall
- Josué Martínez
- Heiner Mora
- Víctor Núñez
- Bryan Oviedo

== 2012 ==
29 February Friendly	Wales	0–1	Costa Rica	Cardiff, Wales
19:45 (GMT)			7' Campbell	Stadium: Cardiff City Stadium; Attendance: 23,000; Referee: Howard Webb (England)

21 March Friendly	Jamaica	0–0	Costa Rica	Kingston, Jamaica
20:00 (UTC−5)				Stadium: Independence Park; Referee: David Gantar (Canada)

11 April Friendly	Costa Rica	1–1	Honduras	San José, Costa Rica
19:00 (UTC−6)	Vargas 49'		23' Suazo	Stadium: Estadio Nacional; Referee: Mark Geiger (United States)

25 May Friendly	Costa Rica	3–2	Guatemala	San José, Costa Rica
20:00 (UTC−6)	J. López 24' (o.g.); Á. Sánchez 35'; González 77'		4', 52' Ruiz	Stadium: Estadio Nacional; Referee: José Peñaloza (Mexico)

1 June Friendly	Guatemala	1–0	Costa Rica	Guatemala City, Guatemala
20:00 (UTC−6)	Ruiz 25'			Stadium: Estadio Mateo Flores; Referee: Armando Castro (Honduras)

8 June 2014 FIFA WCQ	Costa Rica	2–2	El Salvador	San José, Costa Rica
20:00 (UTC−6)	Saborío 10'; Campbell 16'		24' Gutiérrez; 54' Romero	Stadium: Estadio Nacional; Attendance: 23,701; Referee: Walter López (Guatemala)

12 June 2014 FIFA WCQ	Guyana	0–4	Costa Rica	Providence, Guyana
20:00 (UTC−4)			19', 26', 52' Saborío; 78' Campbell	Stadium: Providence Stadium; Attendance: 11,000; Referee: Marcos Brea (Cuba)

15 August Friendly	Costa Rica	0–1	Peru	San José, Costa Rica
16:00 (UTC−6)			8' Carrillo	Stadium: Estadio Nacional; Attendance: 8,000; Referee: Armando Castro (Honduras)

7 September 2014 FIFA WCQ	Costa Rica	0–2	Mexico	San José, Costa Rica
20:00 (UTC−6)			43' Salcido; 52' Zavala	Stadium: Estadio Nacional; Attendance: 32,500; Referee: Roberto Moreno (Panama)

11 September 2014 FIFA WCQ	Mexico	1–0	Costa Rica	Mexico City, Mexico
20:00 (UTC−5)	Hernández 61'			Stadium: Estadio Azteca; Attendance: 44,007; Referee: Courtney Campbell (Jamaica)

12 October 2014 FIFA WCQ	El Salvador	0–1	Costa Rica	San Salvador, El Salvador
19:30 (UTC−6)			31' Cubero	Stadium: Estadio Cuscatlán; Attendance: 35,082; Referee: Mark Geiger (United States)

16 October 2014 FIFA WCQ	Costa Rica	7–0	Guyana	San José, Costa Rica
19:00 (UTC−6)	Brenes 10', 48'; Gamboa 14'; Saborío 51' (pen.), 77'; Bolaños 61'; Borges 70'			Stadium: Estadio Nacional; Attendance: 27,500; Referee: Héctor Rodríguez (Honduras)

14 November Friendly	Bolivia	1–1	Costa Rica	Santa Cruz, Bolivia
20:37 (UTC−4)	Saucedo 90+1'		72' Campbell	Stadium: Estadio Ramón Tahuichi Aguilera; Referee: Marcelo de Lima Henrique (Brazil)

=== Statistics ===
Coach(es)

#	Nat.	Coach	Number of matches
1	(Colombia)	Jorge Luis Pinto	13 (All)

General statistics

Competition	GP	W	D	L	GF	GA
2014 FIFA World Cup qualification	6	3	1	2	14	5
Friendlies	7	2	3	2	6	6
Total	13	5	4	4	20	11

==== Goalscorers ====
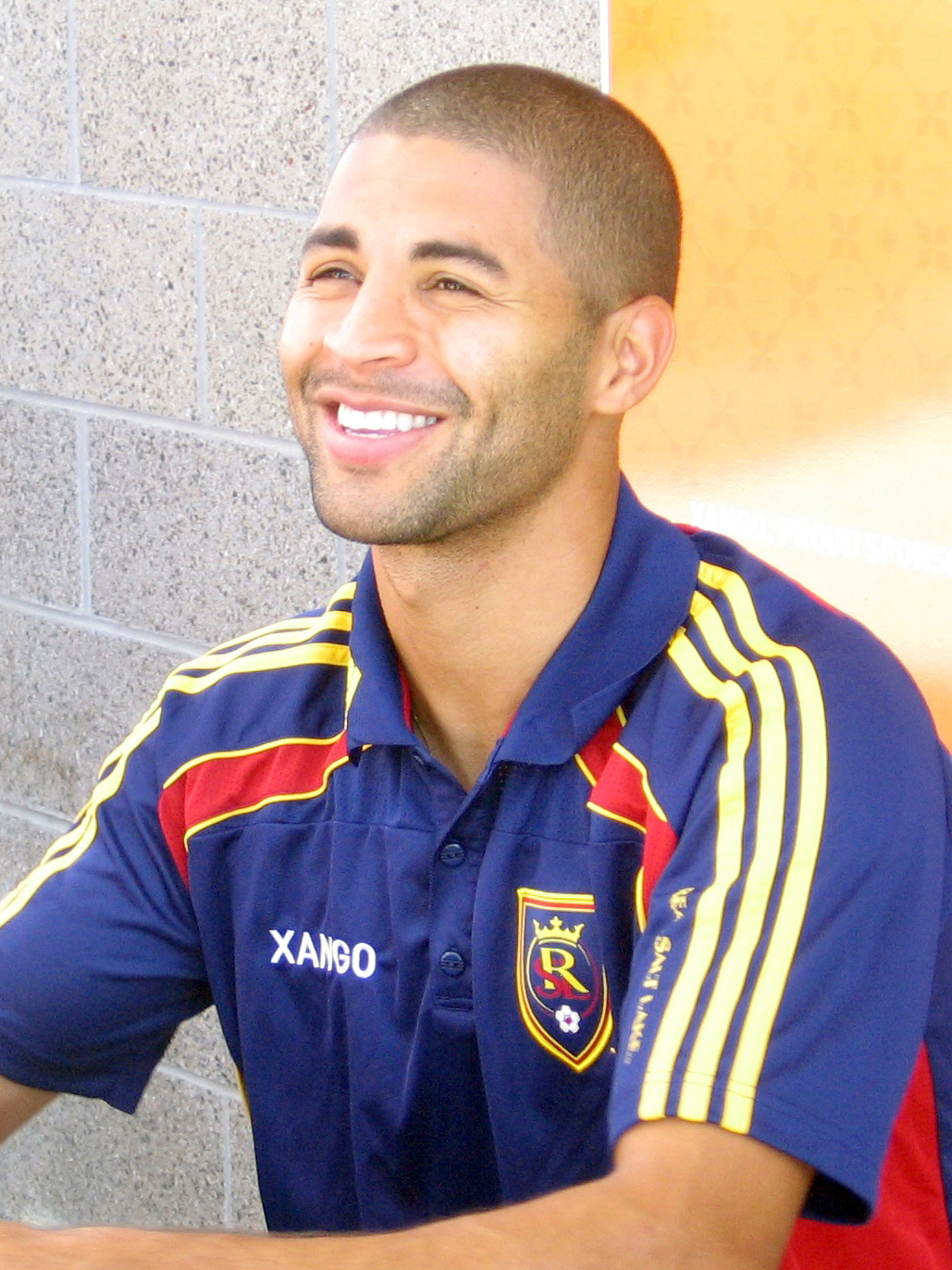
Álvaro Saborío was the top goalscorer for Costa Rica in 2012, scoring six goals

6 goals

- Álvaro Saborío

4 goals

- Joel Campbell

2 goals

- Randall Brenes

1 goal

- Christian Bolaños
- Celso Borges
- José Miguel Cubero
- Cristian Gamboa
- Giancarlo González
- Álvaro Sánchez
- Olman Vargas

1 own goal

- (Guatemala) Jonathan López

== 2013 ==
The year marked a significant recovery in the team status within the Confederation, after several years of decay. In January, the team won the Copa Centroamericana after two consecutive failures in 2009 and 2011. In September, Costa Rica qualified to the 2014 FIFA World Cup after their absence in the 2010 edition. 2013 also marked the year with the most victories for the Costa Rica national team, with 13 victories.

On March 22, Costa Rica played against the United States at the Dick's Sporting Goods Park in Commerce City. The match, dubbed as the Snow Clásico in the United States, was played under a heavy snow fall. As the United States won the match with a goal by Clint Dempsey, Costa Ricans were enraged by the circumstances around the match. On September 6, the Ticos would defeat the United States in San José by 3–1, which was considered as a revenge.

On October 15, Costa Rica defeated Mexico in San José by 2–1, which marked the first victory over the Mexican team in over twelve years, the latest being the Aztecazo in June 2001. It was also the first victory Costa Rica had against Mexico in home soil for over twenty years.

18 January Centroamericana GS	Costa Rica	1–0	Belize	San José, Costa Rica
20:00 (UTC−6)	Arrieta 55'			Stadium: Estadio Nacional; Attendance: 5,484; Referee: Héctor Rodríguez (Honduras)

20 January Centroamericana GS	Costa Rica	2–0	Nicaragua	San José, Costa Rica
18:00 (UTC−6)	Lagos 7'; Borges 86'			Stadium: Estadio Nacional; Attendance: 5,980; Referee: Roberto Moreno (Panama)

22 January Centroamericana GS	Costa Rica	1–1	Guatemala	San José, Costa Rica
20:00 (UTC−6)	Arrieta 11'		90' Contreras	Stadium: Estadio Nacional; Attendance: 6,760; Referee: Héctor Rodríguez (Honduras)

25 January Centroamericana SF	Costa Rica	1–0	El Salvador	San José, Costa Rica
20:00 (UTC−6)	Wallace 72'			Stadium: Estadio Nacional; Attendance: 4,993; Referee: Roberto García (Mexico)

27 January Centroamericana F	Costa Rica	1–0	Honduras	San José, Costa Rica
17:00 (UTC−6)	González 38'			Stadium: Estadio Nacional; Attendance: 14,146; Referee: Joel Aguilar (El Salvador)

6 February 2014 FIFA WCQ	Panama	2–2	Costa Rica	Panama City, Panama
21:00 (UTC−5)	Henríquez 15'; R. Torres 27'		39' Saborío; 84' B. Ruiz	Stadium: Estadio Rommel Fernández; Attendance: 25,000; Referee: Francisco Chacón (Mexico)

22 March 2014 FIFA WCQ	United States	1–0	Costa Rica	Commerce City, United States
20:11 (UTC−6)	Dempsey 16'			Stadium: Dick's Sporting Goods Park; Attendance: 19,734; Referee: Joel Aguilar (El Salvador)

26 March 2014 FIFA WCQ	Costa Rica	2–0	Jamaica	San José, Costa Rica
20:00 (UTC−6)	Umaña 22'; Calvo 82'			Stadium: Estadio Nacional; Attendance: 32,427; Referee: Enrico Wijngaarde (Suriname)

28 May Friendly	Canada	0–1	Costa Rica	Edmonton, Canada
17:00 (UTC−7)			16' (pen.) Arrieta	Stadium: Commonwealth Stadium; Attendance: 8,102; Referee: Chris Penso (United States)

7 June 2014 FIFA WCQ	Costa Rica	1–0	Honduras	San José, Costa Rica
20:10 (UTC−6)	Miller 25'			Stadium: Estadio Nacional; Attendance: 35,000; Referee: Walter López (Guatemala)

11 June 2014 FIFA WCQ	Mexico	0–0	Costa Rica	Mexico City, Mexico
19:00 (UTC−5)				Stadium: Estadio Azteca; Attendance: 65,753; Referee: Mark Geiger (United States)

18 June 2014 FIFA WCQ	Costa Rica	2–0	Panama	San José, Costa Rica
20:00 (UTC−6)	B. Ruiz 49'; Borges 52'			Stadium: Estadio Nacional; Attendance: 35,000; Referee: Courtney Campbell (Jamaica)

9 July Gold Cup GS	Costa Rica	3–0	Cuba	Portland, Oregon, United States
20:30 (UTC−4)	Barrantes 52', 77'; Arrieta 71'			Stadium: Jeld-Wen Field; Attendance: 18,724; Referee: Elmer Bonilla (El Salvador)

13 July Gold Cup GS	Costa Rica	1–0	Belize	Sandy, United States
18:00 (UTC−4)	Eiley 49' (o.g.)			Stadium: Rio Tinto Stadium; Attendance: 17,597; Referee: Enrico Wijngaarde (Suriname)

16 July Gold Cup GS	United States	1–0	Costa Rica	East Hartford, United States
20:00 (UTC−4)	Shea 82'			Stadium: Rentschler Field; Attendance: 25,432; Referee: Courtney Campbell (Jamaica)

21 July Gold Cup QF	Honduras	1–0	Costa Rica	Baltimore, United States
19:00 (UTC−4)	Najar 49'			Stadium: M&T Bank Stadium; Attendance: 70,540; Referee: Courtney Campbell (Jamaica)

14 August Friendly	Dominican Republic	0–4	Costa Rica	Santo Domingo, Dominican Republic
16:00 (UTC−4)			48', 71' Borges; 77' Herrera; 87' Castillo	Stadium: Estadio Quisqueya; Referee: Alain Georges (Haiti)

6 September 2014 FIFA WCQ	Costa Rica	3–1	United States	San José, Costa Rica
20:00 (UTC−6)	Acosta 3'; Borges 10'; Campbell 76'		43' (pen.) Dempsey	Stadium: Estadio Nacional; Attendance: 35,000; Referee: Marco Rodríguez (Mexico)

10 September 2014 FIFA WCQ	Jamaica	1–1	Costa Rica	Kingston, Jamaica
19:00 (UTC−5)	Anderson 90+2'		74' Brenes	Stadium: Independence Park; Attendance: 6,100; Referee: Jair Marrufo (United States)

11 October 2014 FIFA WCQ	Honduras	1–0	Costa Rica	San Pedro Sula, Honduras
15:00 (UTC−6)	Bengtson 64'			Stadium: Estadio Olímpico Metropolitano; Attendance: 38,500; Referee: Jair Marrufo (United States)

15 October 2014 FIFA WCQ	Costa Rica	2–1	Mexico	San José, Costa Rica
19:30 (UTC−6)	B. Ruiz 24'; Saborío 63'		28' Peralta	Stadium: Estadio Nacional; Attendance: 35,000; Referee: Walter López (Guatemala)

19 November Friendly	Australia	1–0	Costa Rica	Sydney, Australia
19:30 (UTC+11)	Cahill 69'			Stadium: Sydney Football Stadium; Attendance: 20,165; Referee: Hiroyoshi Takayama (Japan)

=== Statistics ===
Coach(es)

#	Nat.	Coach	Number of matches
1	(Colombia)	Jorge Luis Pinto	22 (All)

General statistics

Competition	GP	W	D	L	GF	GA
Copa Centroamericana	5	4	1	0	6	1
Gold Cup	4	2	0	2	4	2
2014 FIFA World Cup qualification	10	5	3	2	13	7
Friendlies	3	2	0	1	5	1
Total	22	13	4	5	28	11

==== Goalscorers ====
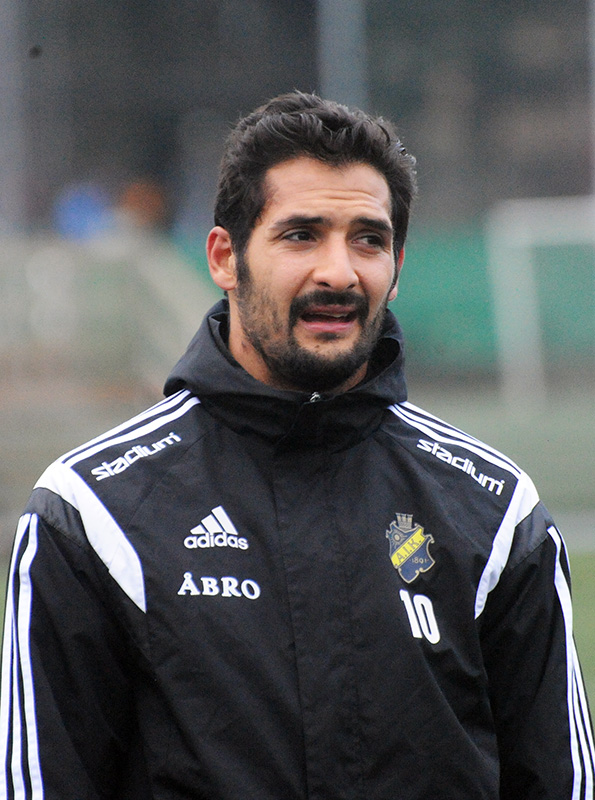
Celso Borges was the top goalscorer for Costa Rica, scoring five goals

5 goals

- Celso Borges

4 goals

- Jairo Arrieta

3 goals

- Bryan Ruiz

2 goals

- Michael Barrantes
- Álvaro Saborío

1 goal

- Jhonny Acosta
- Randall Brenes
- Diego Calvo
- Joel Campbell
- Mauricio Castillo
- Giancarlo González
- Pablo Herrera
- Cristhiam Lagos
- Roy Miller
- Michael Umaña
- Rodney Wallace

1 own goal

- (Belize) Dalton Eiley

== 2014 ==
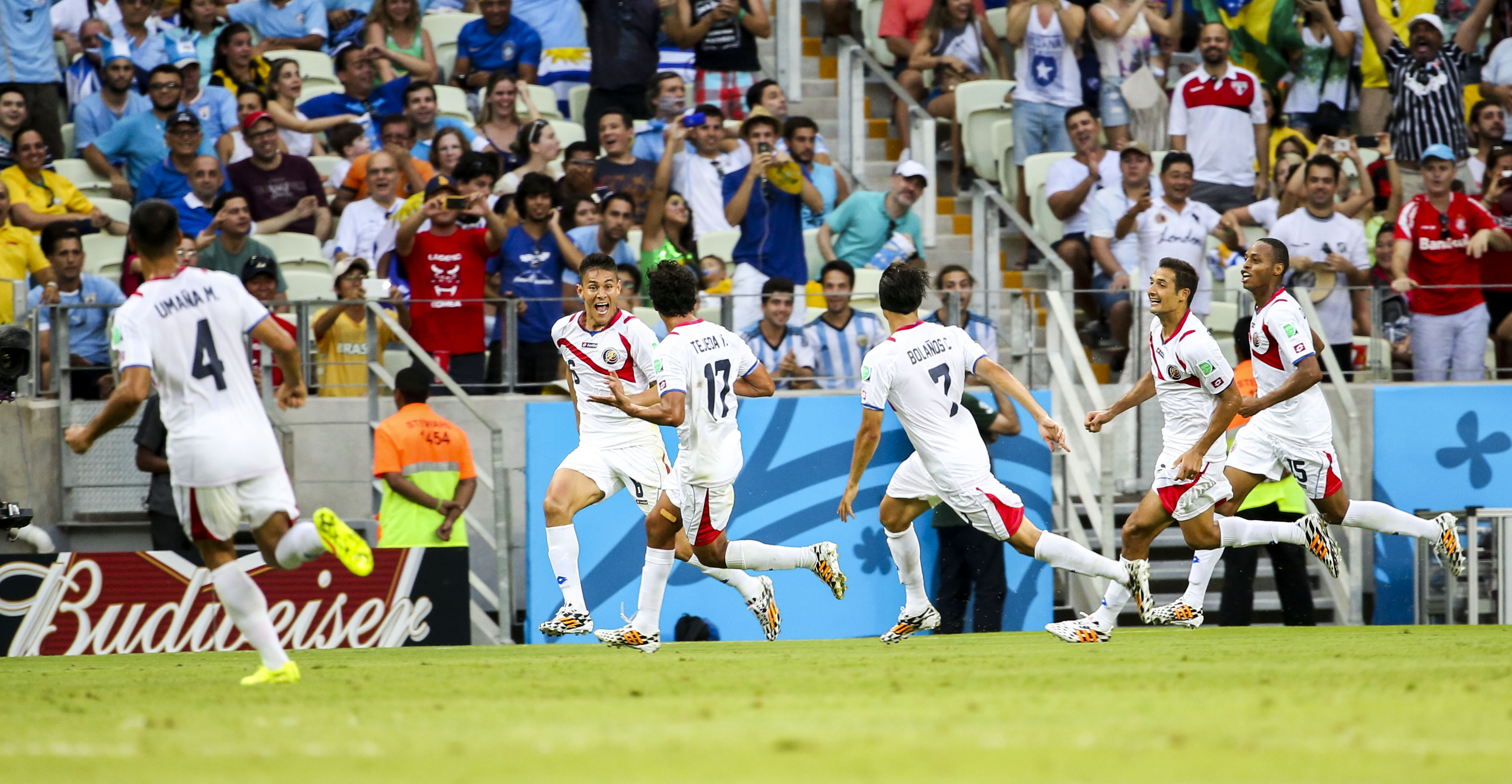
Óscar Duarte celebrates with his teammates after scoring against Uruguay at the FIFA World Cup. Costa Rica made their best performance at the tournament after reaching the quarter-finals

Below are listed all the matches played by the Costa Rica national football team in 2014.

The year, regarded to be the best in the history of Costa Rican football, saw the Ticos becoming the revelation team at the 2014 FIFA World Cup.

After being drawn into Group D —along with former World Champions Uruguay, Italy and England—, initial reaction towards the team was of mockery, and underestimation. During a segment of TeleSUR program De Zurda, Diego Maradona mocked the team by saying "if I was Costa Rican, I would have to shoot myself [in the balls]". Costa Rica topped the group undefeated after beating both Uruguay and Italy, finishing with a draw against England. The Ticos would defeat Greece in the Round of 16 throughout the penalty shootouts. Costa Rica was then eliminated by the Netherlands in the quarter-finals again in the penalty shootouts.

After the World Cup, Jorge Luis Pinto resigned as the coach of the national team, denouncing that a member of his coaching staff requested his sacking. Paulo Wanchope assumed as the interim coach of the team, only to be confirmed in the charge in January 2015. With Wanchope in charge, Costa Rica won the 2014 Copa Centroamericana, thus qualifying to the Copa América Centenario.

22 January Friendly	Chile	4–0	Costa Rica	Coquimbo, Chile
21:00 (UTC−3)	Albornoz 13'; Hernández 51', 54'; Muñoz 79'			Stadium: Estadio Municipal Francisco Sánchez Rumoroso; Attendance: 17,000; Referee: Mauro Vigliano (Argentina)

25 January Friendly	Costa Rica	0–1	South Korea	Los Angeles, United States
17:00 (UTC−8)			10' Shin-wook	Stadium: Los Angeles Memorial Coliseum; Attendance: 15,000; Referee: Baldomero Toledo (United States)

5 March Friendly	Costa Rica	2–1	Paraguay	San José, Costa Rica
20:00 (UTC−6)	Campbell 44'; Saborío 73'		86' Gómez	Stadium: Estadio Nacional; Attendance: 10,000; Referee: Armando Castro (Honduras)

2 June Friendly	Costa Rica	1–3	Japan	Tampa, United States
20:00 (UTC−5)	B. Ruiz 31'		60' Endō; 80' Kagawa; 90+2' Kakitani	Stadium: Raymond James Stadium; Attendance: 7,106; Referee: Chris Penso (United States)

6 June Friendly	Costa Rica	1–1	Republic of Ireland	Chester, United States
19:00 (UTC−5)	Borges 64' (pen.)		18' Doyle	Stadium: PPL Park; Attendance: 7,000; Referee: Raúl Castro (Honduras)

14 June World Cup GS	Uruguay	1–3	Costa Rica	Fortaleza, Brazil
16:00 (UTC−3)	Cavani 24' (pen.)		54' Campbell; 57' Duarte; 84' Ureña	Stadium: Estádio Castelão; Attendance: 58,679; Referee: Felix Brych (Germany)

20 June World Cup GS	Italy	0–1	Costa Rica	Recife, Brazil
13:00 (UTC−3)			44' B. Ruiz	Stadium: Arena Pernambuco; Attendance: 40,285; Referee: Enrique Osses (Chile)

24 June World Cup GS	Costa Rica	0–0	England	Belo Horizonte, Brazil
13:00 (UTC−3)				Stadium: Estádio Mineirão; Attendance: 57,823; Referee: Djamel Haimoudi (Algeria

29 June World Cup R-16	Costa Rica	1–1 (5–3 p)	Greece	Recife, Brazil
17:00 (UTC−3)	B. Ruiz 52'		90+1' Papastathopoulos	Stadium: Arena Pernambuco; Attendance: 41,242; Referee: Ben Williams (Australia
	Penalties
	Borges (penalty scored); B. Ruiz (penalty scored); González (penalty scored); Campbell (penalty scored); Umaña (penalty scored)		(penalty scored) Mitroglou; (penalty scored) Christodoulopoulos; (penalty scored) Holebas; (penalty missed) Gekas

5 July World Cup QF	Netherlands	0–0 (4–3 p)	Costa Rica	Salvador, Brazil
17:00 (UTC−3				Stadium: Arena Fonte Nova; Attendance: 51,179; Referee: Ravshan Irmatov (Uzbekistan)
	Penalties
	Van Persie (penalty scored); Robben (penalty scored); Sneijder (penalty scored); Kuyt (penalty scored)		(penalty scored) Borges; (penalty missed) B. Ruiz; (penalty scored) González; (penalty scored) Bolaños; (penalty missed) Umaña

3 September Centroamericana GS	Costa Rica	3–0	Nicaragua	Washington, D.C., United States
17:30 (UTC−4)	Borges 39' (pen.); Ureña 49'; Venegas 85'			Stadium: RFK Memorial Stadium; Attendance: 20,516; Referee: Héctor Rodríguez (Honduras)

7 September Centroamericana GS	Costa Rica	2–2	Panama	Dallas, United States
16:00 (UTC−5)	Venegas 81'; Borges 87' (pen.)		51' Pérez; 71' Nurse	Stadium: Cotton Bowl; Attendance: 20,156; Referee: Joel Aguilar (El Salvador)

13 September Centroamericana F	Guatemala	1–2	Costa Rica	Los Angeles, United States
21:00 (UTC−5)	C. Ruiz 25'		29' B. Ruiz; 56' Golobio	Stadium: Los Angeles Memorial Coliseum; Attendance: 41,969; Referee: Roberto Moreno (Panama)

10 October Friendly	Oman	3–4	Costa Rica	Sohar, Oman
20:00 (UTC+4)	Saleh 27'; Al-Siyabi 54'; Al-Hosni 59'		4' Saborío; 45+2' J. Ruiz; 47' Golobio; 50' Ramírez	Stadium: Sohar Regional Sports Complex; Referee: Salah Abbas Alabbasi (Bahrain)

14 October Friendly	South Korea	1–3	Costa Rica	Seoul, South Korea
20:00 (UTC+9)	Lee Dong-gook 45+1'		37', 47' Borges; 78' Duarte	Stadium: Seoul World Cup Stadium; Attendance: 39,210; Referee: Alireza Faghani (Iran)

13 November Friendly	Uruguay	3–3 (6–7 p)	Costa Rica	Montevideo, Uruguay
19:00 (UTC−3)	Suárez 50'; Giménez 64'; Cavani 67'		42' Saborío; 51' Ruiz; 90+1' Venegas	Stadium: Estadio Centenario; Referee: Germán Delfino (Argentina)
	Penalties
	Suárez (penalty scored); J. Rodríguez (penalty scored); Ramírez (penalty scored); Corujo (penalty scored); Arévalo Ríos (penalty missed); Á. Pereira (penalty scored); M. Pereira (penalty scored); G. Pereira (penalty missed)		(penalty missed) Borges; (penalty scored) Ruiz; (penalty scored) Saborío; (penalty scored) González; (penalty scored) Duarte; (penalty scored) Díaz; (penalty scored) Golobio; (penalty scored) Gamboa

== Statistics ==
=== Coach(es) ===
#	Nat.	Coach	Number of matches
1	(Colombia)	Jorge Luis Pinto	10
2	(Costa Rica)	Paulo Wanchope	6

=== General statistics ===
Competition	GP	W	D	L	GF	GA
FIFA World Cup	5	2	3	0	5	2
Copa Centroamericana	3	2	1	0	7	3
Friendlies	8	3	2	3	14	17
Total	16	7	6	3	26	22

=== Goalscorers ===
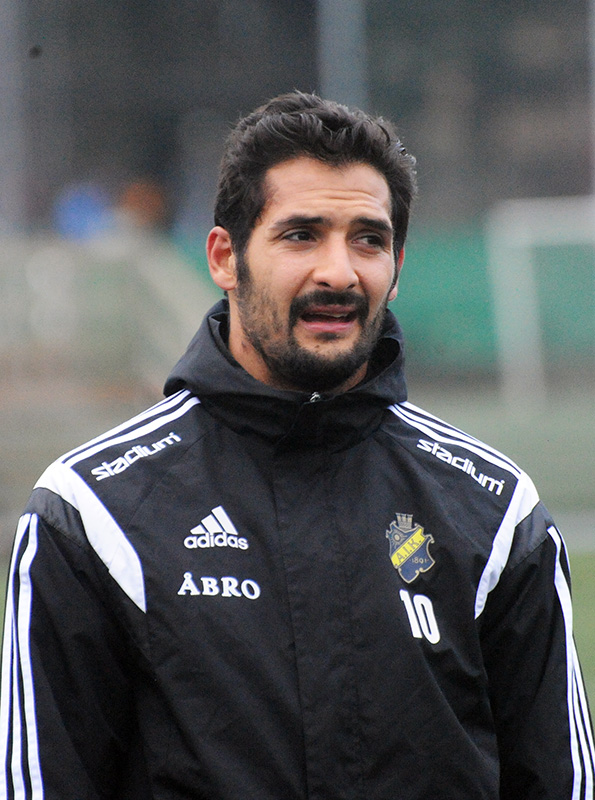
Celso Borges was the top goalscorer for the second year in a row, scoring five goals in 2014

5 goals

- Celso Borges

4 goals

- Bryan Ruiz

3 goals

- Juan Bustos Golobio
- Álvaro Saborío
- Johan Venegas

2 goals

- Joel Campbell
- Óscar Duarte
- Marco Ureña

1 goal

- David Ramírez
- John Jairo Ruiz

== 2015 ==
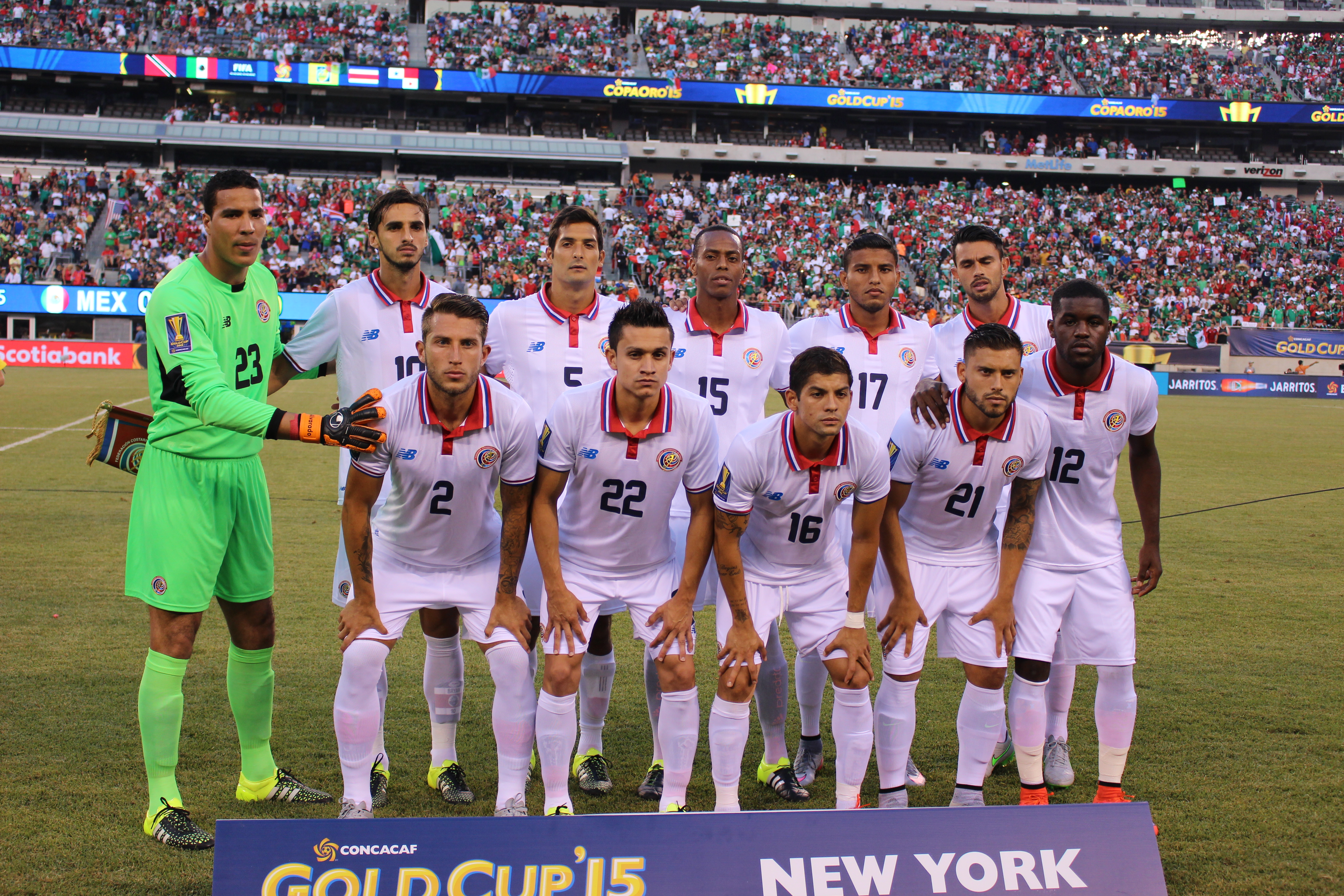
The team before the CONCACAF Gold Cup quarter-final match against Mexico

Below are listed all the matches played by the Costa Rica national football team in 2015.

During most of the year, the team suffered with lackluster results, including their second worst streak without winning. The CONCACAF Gold Cup saw the Ticos reaching the quarterfinals with three draws in the group stage –against Jamaica, El Salvador and Canada– only to be eliminated by Mexico with a controversial penalty awarded to the Mexicans.

On August 11, the team's manager Paulo Wanchope was involved in a fight during a match of the under-23 national team. After the match the team played against Panama at the Estadio Maracaná, Wanchope tried to enter the pitch from the stands, being prevented to do so by a security official. During the struggle with the guard to open the gate, Wanchope accidentally hit a boy and proceeded to fight with the guard. After the incident, Wanchope met with members of the Costa Rican Football Federation and announced his resignation from the management of the national team.

Óscar Ramírez was appointed as the new manager of the team, just a week after being announced as Wanchope's assistant. With Ramírez in charge, the Ticos earned their first triump of the year by beating Uruguay 1–0 in San José, and beginning the qualification process to the 2018 FIFA World Cup with two wins against Haiti and Panama.

26 March Friendly	Costa Rica	0–0	Paraguay	San José, Costa Rica
20:00 (UTC−6)				Stadium: Estadio Nacional; Attendance: 31,000; Referee: John Pitti (Panama)

31 March Friendly	Panama	2–1	Costa Rica	Panama City, Panama
20:00 (UTC−5)	Pérez 17'; Tejada 25'		67' (pen.) Saborío	Stadium: Estadio Rommel Fernández; Attendance: 18,500; Referee: Luis Enrique Santander (Mexico)

6 June Friendly	Colombia	1–0	Costa Rica	Buenos Aires, Argentina
18:15 (UTC−3)	Falcao 47'			Stadium: Estadio Pedro Bidegain; Referee: Carlos Amarilla (Paraguay)

11 June Friendly	Spain	2–1	Costa Rica	León, Spain
21:00 (UTC+1)	Alcácer 8'; Fàbregas 30'		6' Venegas	Stadium: Estadio Reino de León; Attendance: 13,000; Referee: Domagoj Vučkov (Croatia)

27 June Friendly	Mexico	2–2	Costa Rica	Orlando, United States
18:00 (UTC−4)	G. Dos Santos 53'; Hernández 55'		4' Ramírez; 36' (o.g.) Layún	Stadium: Orlando Citrus Bowl; Attendance: 53,629; Referee: Edvin Jurisevic (United States)

8 July Gold Cup GS	Costa Rica	2–2	Jamaica	Carson, United States
20:00 (UTC−4)	Miller 33'; D. Ramírez 37'		13' McCleary; 48' McAnuff	Stadium: StubHub Center; Attendance: 22,648; Referee: Fernando Guerrero (Mexico)

11 July Gold Cup GS	Costa Rica	1–1	El Salvador	Houston
21:00 (UTC−4)	B. Ruiz 60'		90+2' Corea	Stadium: BBVA Compass Stadium; Attendance: 22,017; Referee: Jair Marrufo (United States)

14 July Gold Cup GS	Canada	0–0	Costa Rica	Toronto, Canada
20:30 (UTC−4)				Stadium: BMO Field; Attendance: 16,674; Referee: Héctor Rodríguez (Honduras)

19 July Gold Cup QF	Mexico	1–0	Costa Rica	East Rutherford, United States
19:30 (UTC−4)	Guardado 120+4' (pen.)			Stadium: MetLife Stadium; Attendance: 74,187; Referee: Walter López (Guatemala)

5 September Friendly	Brazil	1–0	Costa Rica	Harrison, United States
15:00 (UTC−4)	Hulk 10'			Stadium: Red Bull Arena; Attendance: 19,600; Referee: Mathieu Bourdeau (Canada)

8 September Friendly	Costa Rica	1–0	Uruguay	San José, Costa Rica
20:00 (UTC−6)	B. Ruiz 9'			Stadium: Estadio Nacional; Referee: Jorge Rojas (Mexico)

8 October Friendly	Costa Rica	0–1	South Africa	San José, Costa Rica
20:00 (UTC−6)			9' Jali	Stadium: Estadio Nacional; Referee: José Peñaloza (Mexico)

13 October Friendly	United States	0–1	Costa Rica	Harrison, United States
18:30 (UTC−4)			70' Campbell	Stadium: Red Bull Arena; Attendance: 9,214; Referee: Walter López (Guatemala)

13 November 2018 FIFA WCQ	Costa Rica	1–0	Haiti	San José, Costa Rica
20:00 (UTC−6)	Gamboa 29'			Stadium: Estadio Nacional; Attendance: 35,000; Referee: Yadel Martínez (Cuba)

17 November 2018 FIFA WCQ	Panama	1–2	Costa Rica	Panama City, Panama
20:30 (UTC−5)	Tejada 71'		66' B. Ruiz; 69' Ureña	Stadium: Estadio Rommel Fernández; Attendance: 26,607; Referee: Joel Aguilar (El Salvador)

15 December Friendly	Costa Rica	1–0	Nicaragua	Liberia, Costa Rica
18:00 (UTC−6)	Waston 59'			Stadium: Estadio Edgardo Baltodano Briceño; Attendance: 3,800; Referee: Jafeth Perea (Panama)

=== Statistics ===
Coach(es)

#	Nat.	Coach	Number of matches
1	(Costa Rica)	Paulo Wanchope	9
2	(Costa Rica)	Óscar Ramírez	7

General statistics

Competition	GP	W	D	L	GF	GA
Gold Cup	4	0	3	1	3	4
2018 FIFA World Cup qualification	2	2	0	0	3	1
Friendlies	10	3	2	5	7	9
Total	16	5	5	6	13	14

==== Goalscorers ====
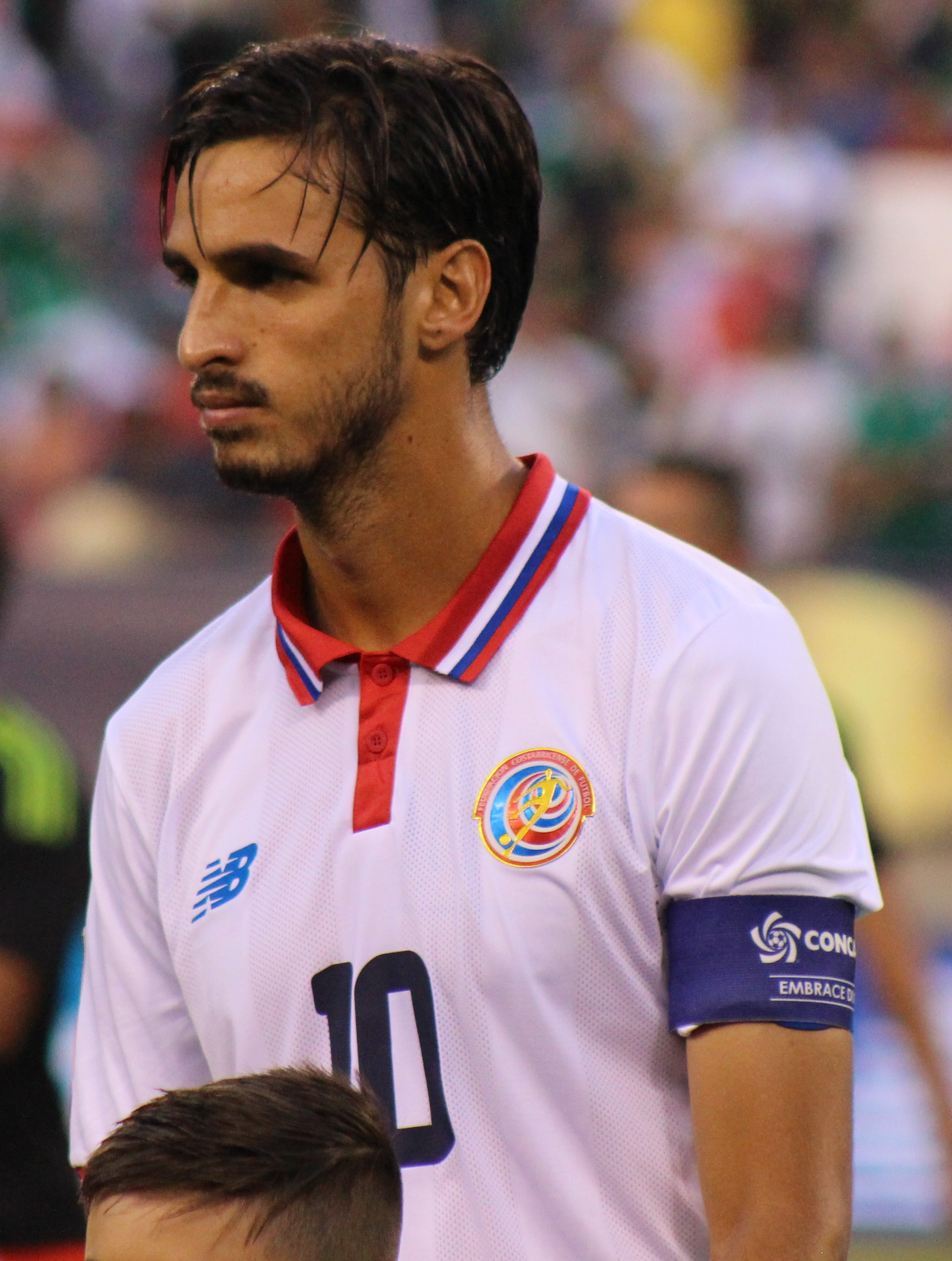
Captain Bryan Ruiz was the top goalscorer for Costa Rica, scoring three goals

3 goals

- Bryan Ruiz

2 goals

- David Ramírez

1 goal

- Joel Campbell
- Cristian Gamboa
- Roy Miller
- Álvaro Saborío
- Marco Ureña
- Johan Venegas
- Kendall Waston

1 owl goal

- (Mexico) Miguel Layún

== 2016 ==
.

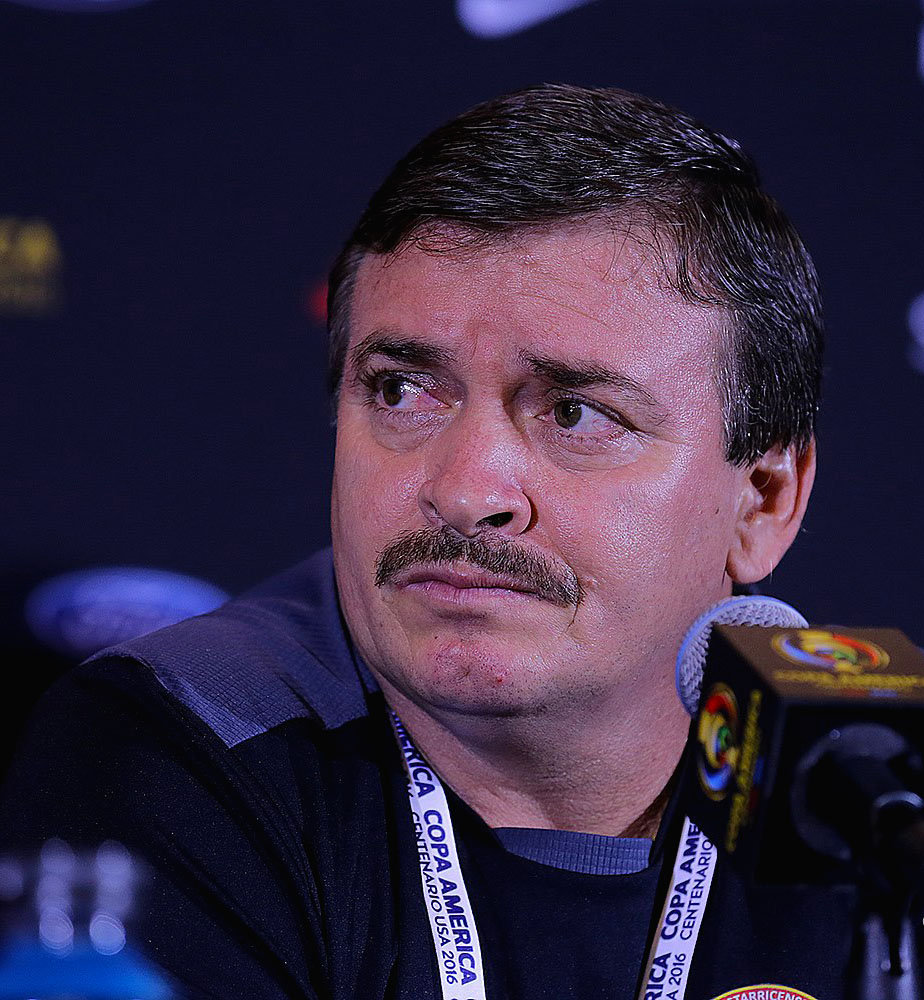
Coach Óscar Ramírez during a Copa América Centenario press conference

The year, which began with a loss in a friendly against Venezuela, resumed the Costa Rican campaign during the fourth round of the CONCACAF qualifying process for the 2018 FIFA World Cup. A double match-up in March against Jamaica saw the Ticos earning four points –after a draw in Kingston and a victory in San José– which led them at the brink of qualification to the next round.

The qualification process was interrupted by the Copa América Centenario, for which Costa Rica prepared by once again facing Venezuela in San José, this time won by the Ticos. Costa Rica began the tournament with a scoreless draw against Paraguay, However, the Costa Rican aspirations came to an abrupt end after a 4–0 loss against the United States, to which La Nación criticized the lack of a second defensive midfielder as an important factor for the defeat, as manager Óscar Ramírez decided to use Celso Borges alone in that position. Already eliminated after the Americans defeated Paraguay, the Costa Ricans redeemed themselves by defeating Colombia by 3–2.

La Sele sealed their qualification to the 2018 FIFA World Cup qualification final round, also known as Hexagonal, by defeating Haiti and Panama and finishing on the first place of their group. In October, Costa Rica defeated 2018 FIFA World Cup hosts Russia by 3–4 at the Krasnodar Stadium.

Costa Rica began the Hexagonal with a 0–2 win against Trinidad and Tobago in Port of Spain. The Ticos went on to avenge their Copa América Centenario 4–0 defeat against the United States by defeating the Americans in San José by the same score. The victory marked the departure of United States' coach Jürgen Klinsmann and also secured the first place for Costa Rica.

2 February Friendly	Venezuela	1–0	Costa Rica	Barinas, Venezuela
19:30 (UTC−4:30)	Ángel 89'	Report		Stadium: Estadio Agustín Tovar; Attendance: 16,000; Referee: Luis Sánchez (Colombia)

25 March 2018 FIFA WCQ	Jamaica	1–1	Costa Rica	Kingston, Jamaica
19:00 UTC−5	Watson 16'	Report (FIFA); Report (CONCACAF)	Acosta 67'	Stadium: Independence Park; Attendance: 21,500; Referee: Jair Marrufo (United States)

29 March 2018 FIFA WCQ	Costa Rica	3–0	Jamaica	San José, Costa Rica
20:00 UTC−6	Borges 7'; B. Ruiz 37'; Venegas 76'	Report (FIFA); Report (CONCACAF)		Stadium: Estadio Nacional de Costa Rica; Attendance: 35,062; Referee: Drew Fischer (Canada)

27 May Friendly	Costa Rica	2–1	Venezuela	San José, Costa Rica
	Gamboa 40'; Rodríguez 49'; Matarrita (yellow card) 71'	Report	Rondón 29'; Figuera (yellow card) 89'	Stadium: Estadio Nacional de Costa Rica; Attendance: 22,000; Referee: Melvin Matamorros (Honduras)

4 June Copa América Centenario	Costa Rica	0–0	Paraguay	Orlando, United States
17:00 (UTC−4)		Report (CONMEBOL); Report (CONCACAF)		Stadium: Orlando Citrus Bowl; Attendance: 14,334; Referee: Patricio Loustau (Argentina)

7 June Copa América Centenario	United States	4–0	Costa Rica	Chicago, United States
20:00 (UTC−5)	Dempsey 9' (pen.); Jones 37'; Wood 42'; Zusi 87'	Report (CONMEBOL); Report (CONCACAF)		Stadium: Soldier Field; Attendance: 39,642; Referee: Roddy Zambrano (Ecuador)

11 June Copa América Centenario	Colombia	2–3	Costa Rica	Houston, United States
21:00 (UTC−4)	Fabra 6'; M. Moreno 73'	Report (CONMEBOL); Report (CONCACAF)	Venegas 2'; Fabra 34' (o.g.); Borges 58'	Stadium: NRG Stadium; Attendance: 45,808; Referee: José Argote (Venezuela)

2 September 2018 FIFA WCQ	Haiti	0–1	Costa Rica	Port-au-Prince, Haiti
19:00 (UTC−5)		Report (FIFA); Report (CONCACAF)	Azofeifa 71'	Stadium: Stade Sylvio Cator; Referee: Marlon Mejía (El Salvador)

6 September 2018 FIFA WCQ	Costa Rica	3–1	Panama	San José, Costa Rica
19:30 UTC−6	Bolaños 19', 79'; Matarrita 84'	Report (FIFA); Report (CONCACAF)	Tejada 90' (pen.)	Stadium: Estadio Nacional de Costa Rica; Referee: Roberto García Orozco (Mexico)

9 October Friendly	Russia	3–4	Costa Rica	Krasnodar, Russia
19:30 (UTC−4:30)	Samedov 31'; Dzyuba 48', 61'		Azofeifa 22'; B. Ruiz 29'; Smolov 45+'; Campbell 90+'	Stadium: Krasnodar Stadium

11 November 2018 FIFA WCQ	Trinidad and Tobago	0–2	Costa Rica	Port of Spain, Trinidad and Tobago
19:00 UTC−4			Bolaños 65'; Matarrita 90+2'	Stadium: Hasely Crawford Stadium; Referee: Óscar Moncada (Honduras)

15 November 2018 FIFA WCQ	Costa Rica	4–0	United States	San José, Costa Rica
20:00 UTC−6	Venegas 43'; Bolaños 69'; Campbell 74', 77'			Stadium: Estadio Nacional de Costa Rica; Referee: César Arturo Ramos (Mexico)

== Statistics ==
=== Coach(es) ===
#	Nat.	Coach	Number of matches
1	(Costa Rica)	Óscar Ramírez	12 (All)

=== General statistics ===
Competition	GP	W	D	L	GF	GA
Copa América Centenario	3	1	1	1	3	6
2018 FIFA World Cup qualification	6	5	1	0	14	2
Friendlies	3	2	0	1	6	4
Total	12	8	2	2	23	12

=== Goalscorers ===
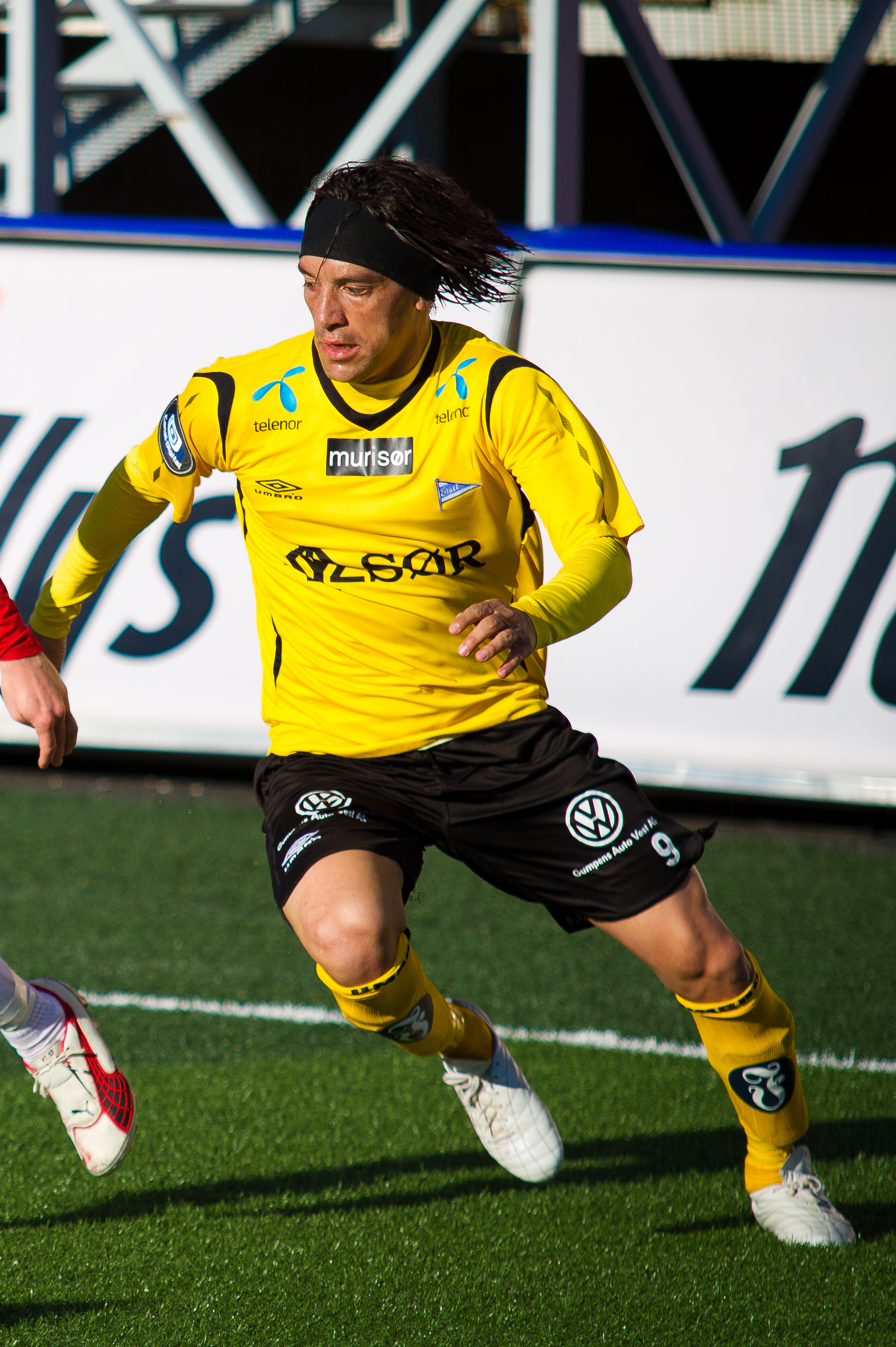
Christian Bolaños was the top goalscorer for Costa Rica, scoring four goals

4 goals

- Christian Bolaños

3 goals

- Joel Campbell
- Johan Venegas

2 goals

- Randall Azofeifa
- Celso Borges
- Rónald Matarrita
- Bryan Ruiz

1 goal

- Jhonny Acosta
- Cristian Gamboa
- Ariel Rodríguez

1 own goal

- (Colombia) Frank Fabra
- (Russia) Vasili Berezutski

== 2017 ==
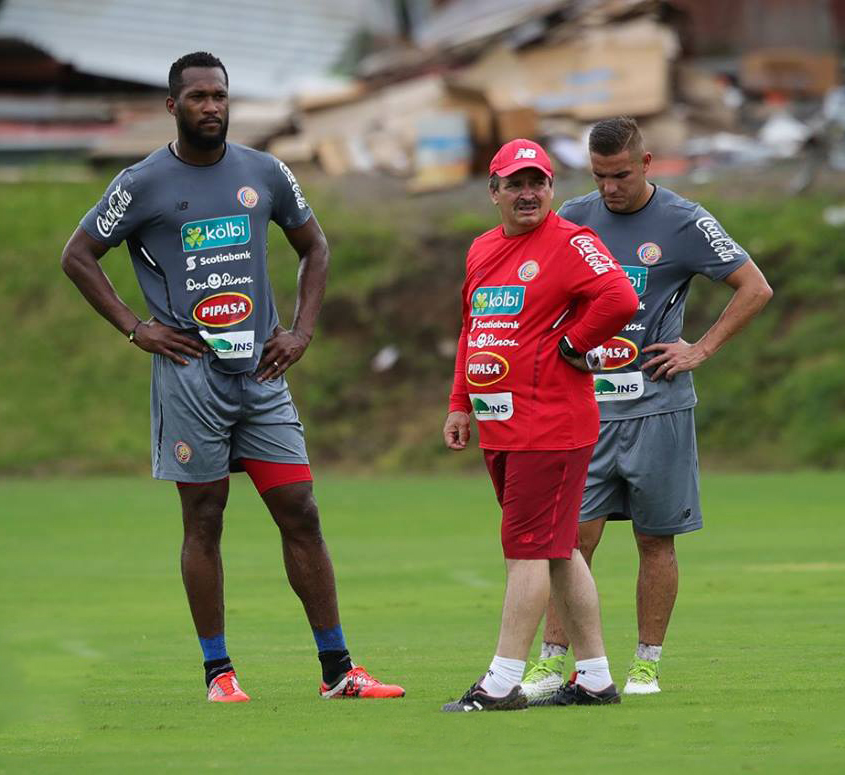
Kendall Waston, Óscar Ramírez and David Guzmán during training on October 2. Five days later, Waston would score the goal that secured Costa Rica's participation in the 2018 FIFA World Cup

Below are listed all the matches played by the Costa Rica national football team in 2017.

The year began with La Sele making their worst display in the Copa Centroamericana since 1995, finishing fourth with a lone win against Belize, draws against El Salvador, Nicaragua and Honduras, and a loss against Panama.

2018 FIFA World Cup qualification resumed with difficulties for the team, losing the first place of the Hexagonal to Mexico after a 2–0 defeat at the Estadio Azteca, a loss for which goalkeeper Keylor Navas was subject of criticism because of the second goal. Four days later, La Sele rescued a point in San Pedro Sula against Honduras with a header by Kendall Waston. The struggle continued in June, with a scoreless draw at the Estadio Nacional against Panama, which ended the Costa Rican streak of ten consecutive wins at home during World Cup qualifiers. Costa Rica returned to victory road by defeating Trinidad and Tobago in San José.

The qualification process was interrupted in July by the CONCACAF Gold Cup. Costa Rica began the tournament by defeating Honduras with a lone goal by Marco Ureña, marking the first time the Ticos defeated Honduras in a Gold Cup match. La Sele went on to top their group after a draw against Canada and a victory against French Guiana. In the quarter-finals, Costa Rica defeated Panama with an own goal by Aníbal Godoy, thus making the Ticos qualify to the Gold Cup semifinals for the first time since 2009. The United States defeated Costa Rica in the semifinals with goals by Jozy Altidore and Clint Dempsey.

In September, Costa Rica defeated the United States in New Jersey as Marco Ureña, who was subject of criticism because of his lack of effectiveness, scored a brace to secure the first Costa Rican win over the Americans in U.S. since 1985, also ending Bruce Arena's undefeated streak since he took over the management of the United States national team. Ureña scored again four days later against Mexico in San José, in a match that ended in a draw, as a side post deflected a shot by Johan Venegas, denying the Ticos the chance to qualify to the World Cup that day.

Devastation left by Hurricane Nate forced the Costa Rican Football Federation to postpone the match against Honduras in San José, originally programmed for October 6, to the next day. Costa Rica secured their presence at the 2018 FIFA World Cup with a draw against the Hondurans with a stoppage time header by Kendall Waston. Costa Rica ended the qualification process as the second place of the Hexagonal after a loss against Panama in the last matchday, which allowed the Panamanians to qualify to their first ever World Cup. The match was met with controversy as referee Wálter López granted Panama's Blas Pérez a goal, in spite of the ball never crossing the line.

Costa Rica ended the year with two losses at European soil, an abrupt 5–0 thrashing to Spain in Málaga and a 1–0 defeat to Hungary in Budapest. Two weeks later, at the 2018 FIFA World Cup seeding, the Ticos were allocated into Group E, along with Brazil, Switzerland and Serbia.

13 January Centroamericana	Costa Rica	0–0	El Salvador	Panama City, Panama
18:30 (UTC−5)		Report		Stadium: Estadio Rommel Fernández; Referee: Jair Marrufo (United States)

15 January Centroamericana	Belize	0–3	Costa Rica	Panama City, Panama
13:00 (UTC−5)		Report	25', 65' Ortiz; 51' Venegas	Stadium: Estadio Rommel Fernández; Referee: Kimbell Ward (Saint Kitts and Nevis)

17 January Centroamericana	Costa Rica	0–0	Nicaragua	Panama City, Panama
18:30 (UTC−5)		Report		Stadium: Estadio Rommel Fernández; Referee: John Pitti (Panama)

20 January Centroamericana	Honduras	1–1	Costa Rica	Panama City, Panama
18:30 (UTC−5)	Andino 17'	Report	59' Calvo	Stadium: Estadio Rommel Fernández; Referee: Fernando Guerrero (Mexico)

22 January Centroamericana	Panama	1–0	Costa Rica	Panama City, Panama
16:00 (UTC−5)	Cooper 67'	Report		Stadium: Estadio Rommel Fernández; Referee: Óscar Moncada (Honduras)

24 March 2018 FIFA WCQ	Mexico	2–0	Costa Rica	Mexico City, Mexico
19:50 (UTC−6)	Hernández 7'; Araujo 45'	Report (FIFA); Report (CONCACAF)		Stadium: Estadio Azteca; Attendance: 61,697; Referee: John Pitti (Panama)

28 March 2018 FIFA WCQ	Honduras	1–1	Costa Rica	San Pedro Sula, Honduras
15:05 (UTC−6)	Lozano 34'	Report (FIFA); Report (CONCACAF)	68' Waston	Stadium: Estadio Francisco Morazán; Attendance: 15,800; Referee: Joel Aguilar (El Salvador)

8 June 2018 FIFA WCQ	Costa Rica	0–0	Panama	San José, Costa Rica
20:00 (UTC−6)		Report (FIFA); Report (CONCACAF)		Stadium: Estadio Nacional; Attendance: 35,040; Referee: Jair Marrufo (United States)

13 June 2018 FIFA WCQ	Costa Rica	2–1	Trinidad and Tobago	San José, Costa Rica
20:00 (UTC−6)	Calvo 1'; Ruiz 44'	Report (FIFA); Report (CONCACAF)	35' Molino	Stadium: Estadio Nacional; Attendance: 34,429; Referee: Yadel Martínez (Cuba)

7 July Gold Cup GS	Honduras	0–1	Costa Rica	Harrison, United States
21:00 (UTC−4)		Report	39' Ureña	Stadium: Red Bull Arena; Attendance: 25,817; Referee: Walter López (Guatemala)

11 July Gold Cup GS	Costa Rica	1–1	Canada	Houston, United States
18:30 (UTC−5)	Calvo 42'	Report	26' Davies	Stadium: BBVA Compass Stadium; Referee: Mark Geiger (United States)

14 July Gold Cup GS	Costa Rica	3–0	French Guiana	Frisco, United States
18:30 (UTC−5)	Rodríguez 4'; Wallace 79'; Ramírez 83'	Report		Stadium: Toyota Stadium; Referee: César Arturo Ramos (Mexico)

19 July Gold Cup QF	Costa Rica	1–0	Panama	Philadelphia, United States
18:00 (UTC−4)	Godoy 77' (o.g.)	Report		Stadium: Lincoln Financial Field; Referee: Óscar Moncada (Honduras)

22 July Gold Cup SF	Costa Rica	0–2	United States	Arlington, United States
21:00 (UTC−5)		Report	72' Altidore; 82' Dempsey	Stadium: AT&T Stadium; Attendance: 45,516; Referee: Joel Aguilar (El Salvador)

1 September 2018 FIFA WCQ	United States	0–2	Costa Rica	Harrison, United States
18:55 (UTC−4)		Report (FIFA); Report (CONCACAF)	Ureña 30', 82'	Stadium: Red Bull Arena; Attendance: 26,500; Referee: John Pitti (Panama)

5 September 2018 FIFA WCQ	Costa Rica	1–1	Mexico	San José, Costa Rica
20:00 (UTC−6)	Ureña 83'	Report (FIFA); Report (CONCACAF)	42' (o.g.) Gamboa	Stadium: Estadio Nacional; Attendance: 33,000; Referee: Mark Geiger (United States)

7 October 2018 FIFA WCQ	Costa Rica	1–1	Honduras	San José, Costa Rica
16:00 (UTC−6)	Waston 90+5'	Report (FIFA); Report (CONCACAF)	66' Hernández	Stadium: Estadio Nacional; Attendance: 24,948; Referee: César Ramos (Mexico)

10 October 2018 FIFA WCQ	Panama	2–1	Costa Rica	Panama City, Panama
19:00 (UTC−5)	Pérez 53'; R. Torres 88'	Report (FIFA); Report (CONCACAF)	36' Venegas	Stadium: Estadio Rommel Fernández; Attendance: 26,503; Referee: Walter López (Guatemala)

10 November Friendly	Spain	5–0	Costa Rica	Málaga, Spain
20:30 (UTC+2)	Alba 6'; Morata 23'; Silva 51', 55'; Iniesta 73'	Report		Stadium: La Rosaleda Stadium; Attendance: 30,000; Referee: Anastasios Sidiropoulos (Greece)

14 November Friendly	Hungary	1–0	Costa Rica	Budapest, Hungary
20:15 (UTC+1)	Nikolić 37'	Report		Stadium: Groupama Arena; Attendance: 9,860; Referee: Alexander Harkam (Austria)

=== Statistics ===
Coach(es)

#	Nat.	Coach	Number of matches
1	(Costa Rica)	Óscar Ramírez	20 (All)

General statistics

Competition	GP	W	D	L	GF	GA
Copa Centroamericana	5	1	3	1	4	2
2018 FIFA World Cup qualification	8	2	4	2	8	8
Gold Cup	5	3	1	1	6	3
Friendlies	2	0	0	2	0	6
Total	20	6	8	6	18	19

==== Goalscorers ====
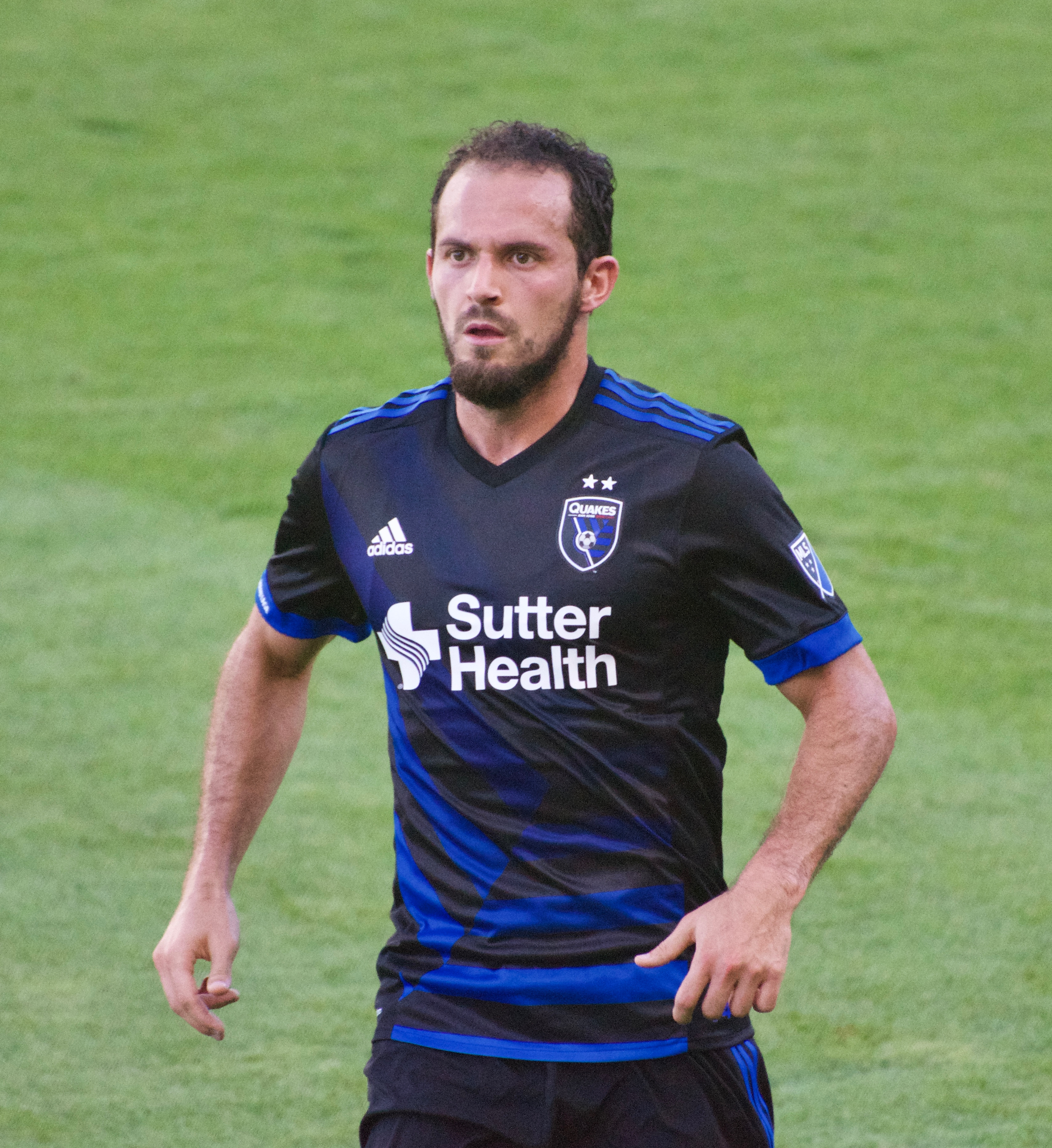
Marco Ureña scored four goals, which made him the top goalscorer for Costa Rica in 2017

4 goals

- Marco Ureña

3 goals

- Francisco Calvo

2 goals

- José Guillermo Ortiz
- Kendall Waston
- Johan Venegas

1 goal

- David Ramírez
- Ariel Rodríguez
- Bryan Ruiz
- Rodney Wallace

1 own goal

- (Panama) Aníbal Godoy

== 2018 ==
23 March Friendly	Scotland	0–1	Costa Rica	Glasgow, Scotland
19:45 (UTC±0)		Report	14' Ureña	Stadium: Hampden Park; Attendance: 20,488; Referee: Tobias Stieler (Germany)

27 March Friendly	Tunisia	1–0	Costa Rica	Nice, France
20:00 (UTC+1)	Khazri 36'	Report		Stadium: Allianz Riviera; Attendance: 7,000; Referee: Frank Schneider (France)

3 June Friendly	Costa Rica	3–0	Northern Ireland	San José, Costa Rica
11:00 (UTC−6)	Venegas 30'; Campbell 46'; Calvo 66'	Report		Stadium: Estadio Nacional de Costa Rica; Attendance: 35,100; Referee: Fernando Guerrero (Mexico)

7 June Friendly	England	2–0	Costa Rica	Leeds, England
20:00 (UTC+1)	Rashford 13'; Welbeck 76'	Report		Stadium: Elland Road; Attendance: 36,104; Referee: Hiroyuki Kimura (Japan)

11 June Friendly	Belgium	4–1	Costa Rica	Brussels, Belgium
20:45 (UTC+2)	Mertens 31'; R. Lukaku 42', 50'; Batshuayi 64'	Report	24' B. Ruiz	Stadium: King Baudouin Stadium; Attendance: 28,000; Referee: Ovidiu Hațegan (Romania)

17 June World Cup GS	Costa Rica	0–1	Serbia	Samara, Russia
16:00 (UTC+4)		Report	56' Kolarov	Stadium: Cosmos Arena; Attendance: 41,432; Referee: Malang Diedhiou (Senegal)

22 June World Cup GS	Brazil	2–0	Costa Rica	Saint Petersburg, Russia
15:00 (UTC+3)	Coutinho 90+1'; Neymar 90+7'	Report		Stadium: Krestovsky Stadium; Attendance: 64,468; Referee: Björn Kuipers (Netherlands)

27 June World Cup GS	Switzerland	2–2	Costa Rica	Nizhny Novgorod, Russia
21:00 (UTC+3)	Džemaili 31'; Drmić 88'	Report	Waston 56'; Sommer 90+3' (o.g.)	Stadium: Nizhny Novgorod Stadium; Attendance: 43,319; Referee: Clément Turpin (France)

7 September Friendly	South Korea	2–0	Costa Rica	Goyang, South Korea
20:00 (UTC+9)	Lee Jae-sung 35'; Nam Tae-hee 78'	Report		Stadium: Goyang Stadium; Attendance: 36,127

11 September Friendly	Japan	3–0	Costa Rica	Suita, Japan
19:45 (UTC+9)	Sasaki 16'; Minamino 66'; J. Ito 90+3'	Report		Stadium: Panasonic Stadium; Attendance: 33,891; Referee: Muhammad Taqi (Singapore)

11 October Friendly	Mexico	3–2	Costa Rica	San Nicolás de los Garza, Mexico
20:30 (UTC−5)	Guzmán 33'; Martín 56'; Jiménez 71' (pen.)	Report	Campbell 29'; Ruiz 44' (pen.)	Stadium: Estadio Universitario; Attendance: 35,827; Referee: Óscar Moncada (Honduras)

16 October Friendly	Costa Rica	1–3	Colombia	Harrison, United States
20:00 (UTC−4)	Waston 44'	Report	Bacca 30'; Hernández 72', 90+2'	Stadium: Red Bull Arena; Referee: Ismail Elfath (United States)

16 November Friendly	Chile	2–3	Costa Rica	Rancagua, Chile
21:15 (UTC−3)	Vegas 70'; Sánchez 90'	Report	Waston 36', 59'; Matarrita 64'	Stadium: Estadio El Teniente; Referee: Germán Delfino (Argentina)

20 November Friendly	Peru	2–3	Costa Rica	Arequipa, Peru
19:30 (UTC−5)	Flores 20'; Farfán 73'	Report	McDonald 41'; Cruz 54'; Campbell 77' (pen.)	Stadium: Estadio Monumental Virgen de Chapi; Referee: Carlos Orbe (Ecuador)

== 2019 ==
2 February Friendly	United States	2–0	Costa Rica	San Jose, United States
12:30 (UTC−8)	Lletget 80'; Arriola 88'	Report		Stadium: Avaya Stadium; Attendance: 13,656; Referee: Fernando Hernández (Mexico)

22 March Friendly	Guatemala	1–0	Costa Rica	Guatemala City, Guatemala
19:00 (UTC−6)	Cincotta 31'	Report		Stadium: Estadio Mateo Flores; Attendance: 14,215; Referee: Jaime Herrera (El Salvador)

26 March Friendly	Costa Rica	1–0	Jamaica	San José, Costa Rica
20:00 (UTC−6)	Fuller 28'	Report		Stadium: Estadio Nacional de Costa Rica; Attendance: 10,000; Referee: Oscar Vergara (Panama)

5 June Friendly	Peru	1–0	Costa Rica	Lima, Peru
20:00 (UTC−5)	Cueva 53'	Report		Stadium: Estadio Monumental; Referee: Darío Herrera (Argentina)

16 June Gold Cup GS	Costa Rica	4–0	Nicaragua	San José, Costa Rica
18:30 (UTC−6)	Oviedo 7'; Borges 19'; Aguilar 45+1'; Cruz 75'	Report		Stadium: Estadio Nacional de Costa Rica; Referee: Marco Ortiz (Mexico)

20 June Gold Cup GS	Costa Rica	2–1	Bermuda	Frisco, United States
20:30 (UTC−5)	George 30'; Aguilar 54'	Report	Wells 59' (pen.)	Stadium: Toyota Stadium; Referee: Yadel Martínez (Cuba)

24 June Gold Cup GS	Haiti	2–1	Costa Rica	Harrison, United States
21:00 (UTC−4)	Nazon 57' (pen.); Alexis 81'	Report	Alexis 13' (o.g.)	Stadium: Red Bull Arena; Referee: Ismail Elfath (United States)

29 June Gold Cup QF	Mexico	1–1 (a.e.t.) (5–4 p)	Costa Rica	Houston, United States
21:00 (UTC−5)	Jiménez 44'	Report	Ruiz 52' (pen.)	Stadium: NRG Stadium; Attendance: 70,788; Referee: John Pitti (Panama)
	Penalties
	Jiménez (penalty missed); Montes (penalty scored); Alvarado (penalty scored); Gallardo (penalty scored); Moreno (penalty scored); Salcedo (penalty scored)		(penalty scored) Borges; (penalty scored) Aguilar; (penalty missed) Leal; (penalty scored) Duarte; (penalty scored) Calvo; (penalty missed) Fuller

6 September Friendly	Costa Rica	1–2	Uruguay	San José, Costa Rica
20:00 (UTC−6)	Borges 48'	Report	De Arrascaeta 42' (pen.); Rodríguez 90'	Stadium: Estadio Nacional de Costa Rica; Referee: Daneon Parchment (Jamaica)

10 October Nations League A	Haiti	1–1	Costa Rica	Nassau, Bahamas
21:00 (UTC−5)	Pierrot 82'	Report	Ortiz 53'	Stadium: Thomas Robinson Stadium; Referee: Drew Fischer (Canada)

13 October Nations League A	Costa Rica	0–0	Curaçao	Alajuela, Costa Rica
18:00 (UTC−6)		Report		Stadium: Estadio Alejandro Morera Soto; Referee: Armando Villarreal (United States)

14 November Nations League A	Curaçao	1–2	Costa Rica	Willemstad, Curaçao
18:30 (UTC−5)	Janga 20'	Report	Venegas 14' (pen.); Calvo 84'	Stadium: Ergilio Hato Stadium; Referee: Marco Ortiz (Mexico)

17 November Nations League A	Costa Rica	1–1	Haiti	San José, Costa Rica
18:00 (UTC−6)	Calvo 27'	Report	Nazon 38' (pen.)	Stadium: Estadio Ricardo Saprissa Aymá; Referee: Said Martínez (Honduras)

== See also ==
- Costa Rica at the Copa América
