= Marvin Ávila =

Guatemalan footballer

Personal information
- Full name: Marvin Tomás Ávila Sánchez
- Date of birth: December 6, 1985 (age 40)
- Place of birth: Livingston, Guatemala
- Height: 1.87 m (6 ft 2 in)
- Position: Midfielder

Team information
- Current team: Sololá

Senior career*
Years	Team	Apps	(Gls)
2005–2007	Suchitepéquez	42	(10)
2007–2009	Municipal	20	(2)
2009	Shaanxi Chanba	2	(1)
2009–2017	Municipal	189	(34)
2017–2018	Suchitepéquez	37	(1)
2018–2020	Siquinalá	57	(4)
2020-2021	Zacapa		
2021-	Sololá	0	(0)

International career
2006–	Guatemala	44	(4)
- * Club domestic league appearances and goals

Marvin Tomás Ávila (born 6 December 1985) is a Guatemalan footballer who plays as a midfielder for Liga Nacional club Sololá and the Guatemala national team.

== Club career ==
Nicknamed "Titi Man", Ávila made his mark in the 2007 Clausura season, considered a breakthrough season for the winger, scoring six goals including a hat-trick against Deportivo Petapa. His form and quick rise for both his club and the national team were the main reasons behind his move to Guatemala's biggest club, Municipal, for the 2007-08 season. On his debut for Municipal in the 2007 Apertura against his former club, CD Suchitepéquez, he scored the winning goal, a spectacular one-time volley off a corner from Freddy García.

In 2009, he had a short stint at Chinese side Shaanxi Chanba, being the first Guatemalan player ever to play for a club in Asia. He then returned to Municipal.

== International career ==
Ávila made his international debut as a late substitute in a match against the United States in a pre-World Cup friendly in February 2006. He scored his first goal for the Guatemalan senior side in a friendly match against Honduras later that year. On 17 October 2007, in a game against the Mexico national team, he came of age at the international level, scoring a brace (first the equalizer and then the winner) and setting up an earlier goal. This superb performance helped Guatemala beat Mexico for the first time in almost seven years. As of January 2010, he had collected 24 caps, scored three goals and represented Guatemala in two FIFA World Cup qualification matches. He also played at the 2007 CONCACAF Gold Cup.

In 2007 and 2008 he was part of Guatemala's under-23 team scoring the winning goal against Haiti, and although the Guatemala National Team started the tournament off strong, they slowly began to lose momentum and eventually fell short of qualifying for the 2008 Olympic tournament.

=== International goals ===
Scores and results list Guatemala's goal tally first.

#	Date	Venue	Opponent	Score	Result	Competition
1	7 October 2006	Lockhart Stadium, Fort Lauderdale, United States	Honduras	2–0	2–3	Friendly
2	17 October 2007	Los Angeles Memorial Coliseum, Los Angeles, United States	Mexico	2–2	3–2	Friendly
3	17 October 2007	Los Angeles Memorial Coliseum, Los Angeles, United States	Mexico	3–2	3–2	Friendly
4	7 September 2014	Cotton Bowl, Dallas, United States	Belize	2–0	2–1	2014 Copa Centroamericana
