= Porfirio López =

Costa Rican footballer (born 1985)

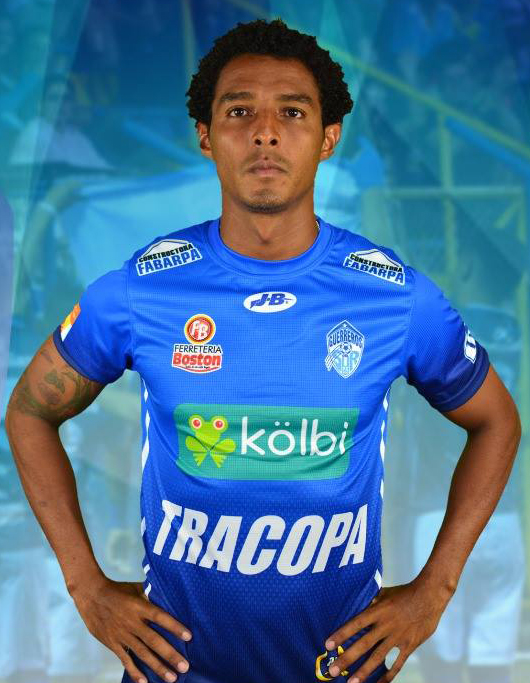

Personal information
- Full name: Porfirio López Meza
- Date of birth: September 10, 1985 (age 41)
- Place of birth: San José, Costa Rica
- Height: 1.82 m (5 ft 11 1/2 in)
- Position: Centre back

Team information
- Current team: Perez Zeledon
- Number: 5

Youth career
- 2004–2006: Santos de Guápiles

Senior career*
Years	Team	Apps	(Gls)
2006–2008	Santos de Guápiles	42	(0)
2009–2010	Puntarenas	31	(1)
2010–2011	Dalian Shide	10	(2)
2011	→ Alajuelense (loan)	22	(1)
2012	Philadelphia Union	5	(0)
2013–2016	Alajuelense	68	(2)
2017–2018	Perez Zeledon	40	(1)
2018–2019	Alajuelense	58	(3)
2019–	Perez Zeledon	2	(0)

International career^{‡}
2011–	Costa Rica	7	(0)
- * Club domestic league appearances and goals as of 23:04, 7 August 2019 (UTC) ‡ National team caps and goals as of 24 May 2014

Porfirio López Meza (Latin American Spanish: [poɾˈfiɾjo ˈlopes]; born September 10, 1985) is a retired Costa Rican professional football player who last played for Municipal Perez Zeledon in the Costa Rican Premier Division.

== Club career ==
Porfirio López began his career with Santos de Guápiles in Costa Rica, already being part of the first team in the 2003/04 season. He made his debut with the club in 2006 and remained at the club for three seasons. He then joined Puntarenas and quickly established himself as the club's starting left back. He moved to China and signed a contract with Dalian Shide in February 2010. He made his CSL debut for Dalian against Shaanxi Chanba on 28 March and scored a goal in the match. After one season in China, López went on loan to Costa Rican club Alajuelense, helping his new club win both the Clausura and Apertura titles in 2011.

López signed with Philadelphia Union of Major League Soccer on December 22, 2011.

López was released by Philadelphia on November 19, 2012.

== International career ==
He made his debut for Costa Rica in an August 2011 friendly match against Ecuador and has, as of May 2014, earned a total of 6 caps, scoring no goals. He represented his country in 1 FIFA World Cup qualification match.

== Career statistics ==
=== Club ===
Club performance			League		Cup		League Cup		Continental		Total	
Season	Club	League	Apps	Goals	Apps	Goals	Apps	Goals	Apps	Goals	Apps	Goals
Costa Rica			League		Cup		League Cup		North America		Total	
2005–06	Santos de Guápiles	Primera División	1	0	0	0	0	0	0	0	1	0
2006–07	Santos de Guápiles	Primera División	15	0	0	0	0	0	0	0	15	0
2007–08	Santos de Guápiles	Primera División	26	0	0	0	0	0	0	0	26	0
2008–09	Santos de Guápiles	Primera División	0	0	0	0	0	0	0	0	0	0
2008–09	Puntarenas	Primera División	15	0	0	0	0	0	0	0	15	0
2009–10	Puntarenas	Primera División	16	1	0	0	0	0	0	0	16	1
China PR			League		FA Cup		CSL Cup		Asia		Total	
2010	Dalian Shide	Chinese Super League	10	2	0	0	0	0	0	0	10	2
Costa Rica			League		Cup		League Cup		North America		Total	
2010–11	Alajuelense	Primera División	3	0	0	0	0	0	0	0	3	0
2011–12	Alajuelense	Primera División	19	1	0	0	0	0	0	0	19	1
USA			League		Open Cup		League Cup		North America		Total	
2012	Philadelphia Union	Major League Soccer	5	0	1	0	0	0	0	0	6	0
Total	Costa Rica		95	2	0	0	0	0	0	0	95	2
Total	China PR		10	2	0	0	0	0	0	0	10	2
Total	USA		5	0	1	0	0	0	0	0	6	0
Career total			110	4	1	0	0	0	0	0	111	4

Updated June 27, 2012

=== International ===
National team	Year	Apps	Goals
Costa Rica
Costa Rica	2011	1	0
Costa Rica	2012	4	0
Total		5	0

Statistics accurate as of August 16, 2012
