= Josué Martínez (footballer, born 1990) =

Costa Rican footballer (born 1990)

Josué Martinez
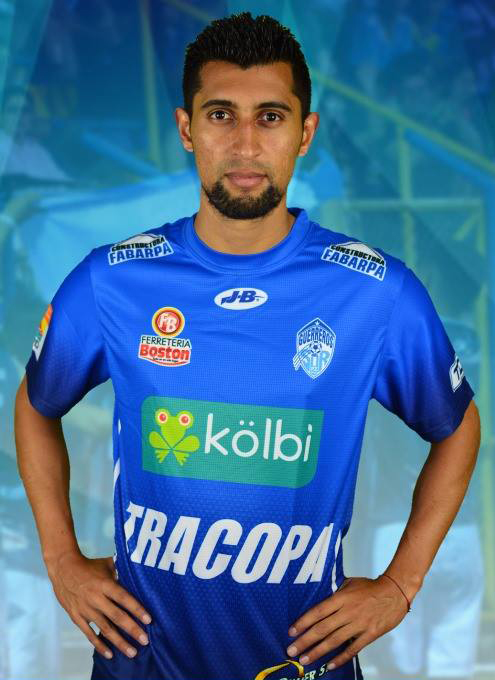
- Martínez in 2017

Personal information
- Full name: Josué Isaac Martinez Areas
- Date of birth: 25 March 1990 (age 36)
- Place of birth: San José, Costa Rica
- Height: 1.79 m (5 ft 10 1/2 in)
- Position: Forward

Youth career
- Saprissa

Senior career*
Years	Team	Apps	(Gls)
2009–2011	Saprissa	66	(19)
2012	Philadelphia Union	18	(1)
2013	New York Red Bulls	1	(0)
2013–2014	Saprissa	15	(4)
2014	Santos de Guápiles	13	(1)
2014–2016	UCR	66	(16)
2016–2017	Herediano	11	(3)
2017	Pérez Zeledón	12	(1)
2018	Guadalupe	19	(3)
2018	Sporting San José		
2019	Municipal Grecia	32	(7)
2020–2021	Antigua	44	(11)
2021	Sporting San José	16	(0)
2022	Guadalupe	18	(2)
2023-	Escorpiones de Belén	1	(0)

International career
2009	Costa Rica U20	7	(5)
2009–	Costa Rica	17	(2)
- * Club domestic league appearances and goals as of 12 February 2024 (UTC)

Josué Isaac Martinez Areas (born 25 March 1990) is a Costa Rican footballer who currently plays for Escorpiones de Belén.

== Club career ==
Martinez began his career with top Costa Rican side Deportivo Saprissa. His first appearance with the club was in the 2009 Torneo de Invierno, this coming after a successful role in the 2009 FIFA U-20 World Cup. Martinez won one title with the club during the 2009–10 Costa Rican Primera División season the Campeonato de Verano 2010. Josué was an important part of The Purple Monster, being one of its top goalscorers in that tournament also scoring the 1-0 winning goal against Liga Deportiva Alajuelense in the first of two matches of "El Clásico" de Costa Rica, at Ricardo Saprissa Stadium in San José. He wore the number 28 for Saprissa and scored 19 goals in 66 league matches with the club. Martinez also scored an important goal during the CONCACAF Champions League which sent Saprissa to the 2010-11 knockout stage. On 19 October 2010 in a match that was played in Seattle, Martinez's scored an 89th-minute goal beating Seattle Sounders FC goalkeeper Kasey Keller which helped Saprissa to a 2–1 victory.

On 7 December 2011, Philadelphia Union signed the Costa Rican international. In his first season in Major League Soccer Martinez appeared in 18 league matches and scored 1 goal. On 6 December 2012, Martinez was traded to New York Red Bulls along with allocation money for Sebastien Le Toux.

Martínez was waived by New York on 29 March 2013.

== International career ==
Martinez was a prominent member of Costa Rica's 2009 FIFA U-20 World Cup squad, where Costa Rica placed 4th after losing to Hungary in the 3rd place match. He scored two goals in the competition.

Martinez is considered a promising prospect for Costa Rican football and its National Team, he debuted with the full national team in 2009 prior to his debut with the Saprissa first team. He was a member of Costa Rica's 2011 Copa América side, netting 1 goal in 3 matches during the competition.

Scores and results list. Costa Rica's goal tally first.

Goal	Date	Venue	Opponent	Score	Result	Competition
1	12 October 2010	Estadio Carlos Ugalde, San Carlos, Costa Rica	El Salvador	2–1	2–1	Friendly
2	7 July 2011	Estadio 23 de Agosto, Jujuy, Argentina	Bolivia	1–0	2–0	2011 Copa América

== Career statistics ==
=== Club ===
Club performance			League		Cup		League Cup		Continental		Total	
Season	Club	League	Apps	Goals	Apps	Goals	Apps	Goals	Apps	Goals	Apps	Goals
Costa Rica			League		Cup		League Cup		North America		Total	
2009–10	Saprissa	Primera División	25	8	0	0	0	0	0	0	25	8
2010–11	Saprissa	Primera División	23	5	0	0	0	0	10	2	33	7
2011–12	Saprissa	Primera División	18	6	0	0	0	0	0	0	18	6
USA			League		Open Cup		League Cup		North America		Total	
2012	Philadelphia Union	Major League Soccer	18	1	2	1	0	0	0	0	20	2
2013	New York Red Bulls	Major League Soccer	1	0	0	0	0	0	0	0	1	0
Total	Costa Rica		66	19	0	0	0	0	10	2	76	21
Total	USA		19	1	2	1	0	0	0	0	21	2
Career total			85	20	2	1	0	0	10	2	97	23

Updated 29 March 2013.

=== International ===
National team	Year	Apps	Goals
Costa Rica
Costa Rica	2009	1	0
Costa Rica	2010	7	1
Costa Rica	2011	8	1
Total		16	2

Statistics accurate as of 7 December 2011
