= José Sánchez (footballer, born 1987) =

Costa Rican footballer

Personal information
- Full name: José Alfredo Sánchez Barquero
- Date of birth: May 20, 1987 (age 39)
- Place of birth: San José, Costa Rica
- Height: 1.65 m (5 ft 5 in)
- Position: Midfielder

Team information
- Current team: Pérez Zeledón
- Number: 17

Senior career*
Years	Team	Apps	(Gls)
2007–2008	Universidad	28	(4)
2008–2011	Herediano	55	(3)
2011–2012	Cartaginés	26	(0)
2012–2018	Herediano	217	(15)
2014	→ Pérez Zeledón (loan)	17	(4)
2018	Guastatoya	13	(1)
2019–2020	Pérez Zeledón	47	(1)

International career^{‡}
2010–	Costa Rica	2	(1)
- * Club domestic league appearances and goals as of 20:22, 25 May 2020 (UTC) ‡ National team caps and goals as of 15:28, 24 September 2014 (UTC)

José Alfredo Sánchez Barquero (born 20 May 1987), is a Costa Rican footballer who plays for Pérez Zeledón as a midfielder.

== Club career ==
Sánchez started his career with Universidad in the second division, making his first tier debut in 2007. In 2011, he joined Herediano and played there till 2011, before returning to the club after having a short stint with Cartaginés. Sánchez had a short loan stint with Pérez Zeledón in 2014, where he scored 4 goals.

== International career ==
On 13 October 2010, he made his international debut against El Salvador scoring a goal in the 10th minute. In 2014, after 4 years he was recalled to the team for 2014 Copa Centroamericana.

=== International goals ===
#	Date	Venue	Opponent	Score	Result	Competition
1.	12 October 2010	Estadio Carlos Ugalde Álvarez, Ciudad Quesada, Costa Rica	El Salvador	1–0	2–1	Friendly
