= Marco Pappa =

Guatemalan footballer

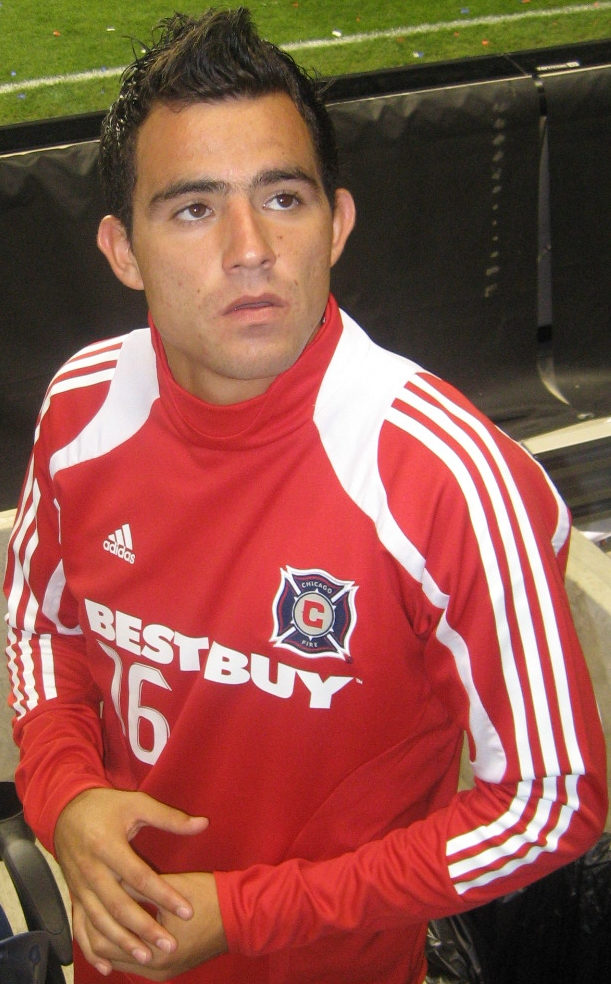
- Pappa with Chicago Fire in 2008

Personal information
- Full name: Marco Pablo Pappa Ponce
- Date of birth: 15 November 1987 (age 38)
- Place of birth: Guatemala City, Guatemala
- Height: 1.78 m (5 ft 10 in)
- Position: Midfielder

Youth career
- 2004–2006: Municipal

Senior career*
Years	Team	Apps	(Gls)
2006–2009	Municipal	33	(5)
2008–2009	→ Chicago Fire (loan)	36	(5)
2009–2012	Chicago Fire	76	(21)
2012–2014	Heerenveen	11	(0)
2014–2015	Seattle Sounders FC	49	(9)
2016–2017	Colorado Rapids	20	(2)
2017	Municipal	18	(2)
2017–2018	Municipal	29	(5)
2018–2019	Xelajú	28	(5)
2019	Mixco	12	(1)
2020	San Pedro	0	(0)
2022–2023	Achuapa	5	(0)

International career^{‡}
2008–2019	Guatemala	57	(11)
- * Club domestic league appearances and goals as of October 23, 2019 ‡ National team caps and goals as of August 15, 2019

Marco Pablo Pappa Ponce (born 15 November 1987) is a Guatemalan former professional footballer who primarily played as a midfielder.

== Club career ==
Born in Guatemala City, Pappa, who plays as a winger, joined his local side, Municipal, in 2004 at the age of 16, and made his professional debut in a domestic league match in August 2006 against Deportivo Petapa. He scored his first professional goal against Nicaraguan side Real Madriz during the 2007 UNCAF tournament.

=== Chicago Fire (2008–2012) ===
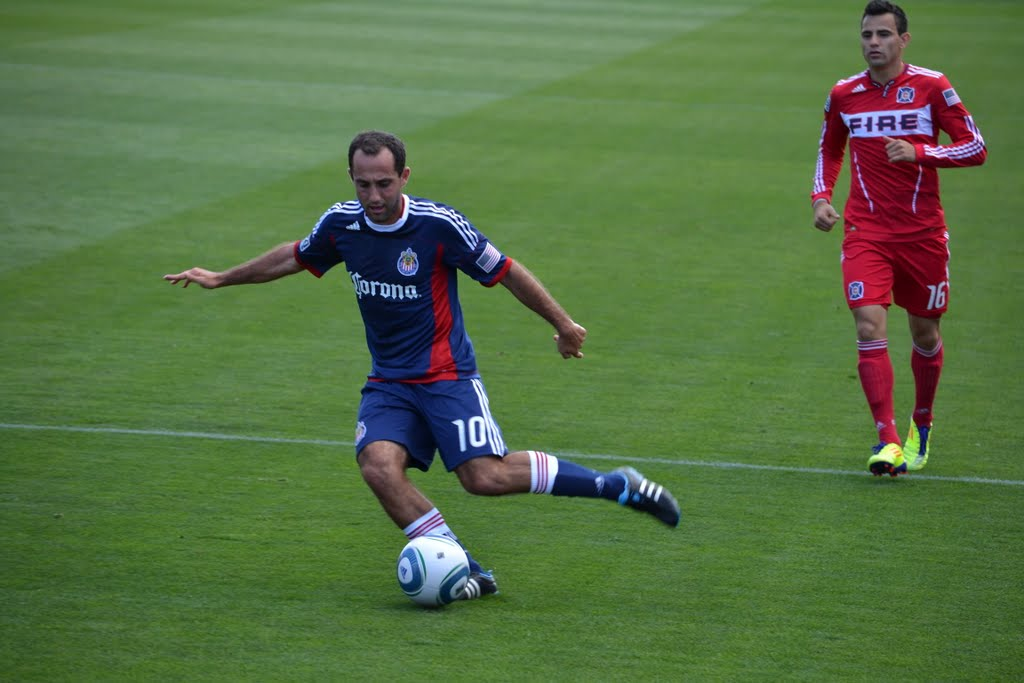
Marco Pappa playing for Chicago Fire

Pappa signed a one-and-a-half-year loan deal with Chicago Fire on 30 July 2008, and made his MLS debut for Fire on 2 August 2008, against Chivas USA. He scored his first MLS goal on 5 April 2009, in a game against the New York Red Bulls. On 3 December 2009 The Fire exercised their option to buy Pappa's rights from Municipal, thus ending almost two-year loan deal it had for Pappa and securing his services through the 2012 season.

Pappa started the 2010 MLS season in great form for the Chicago Fire with 5 goals and 4 assists in his first 11 games, making one of the league's top performing midfielders, and finished the year with seven goals (being the team's top scorer) and five assists. He was also awarded the MLS "Goal of the Year" award of the 2010 season for his goal against San Jose Earthquakes on 10 April 2010.

During the 2011 season, Pappa scored eight goals, including a hat-trick on 28 September 2011 in an away win against Real Salt Lake, earning the "Player of the Week" award and becoming the second Guatemalan player to score three goals in an MLS match after Carlos Ruiz had done it in 2002 and 2003.

=== Heerenveen (2012–2014) ===
Per an announcement made on 13 August 2012 Pappa was originally going to join the Dutch club SC Heerenveen of the Eredivisie on 1 January 2013 on a three-and-a-half-year deal. However, on 30 August, Chicago agreed to make the deal an immediate transfer. On 3 January 2014 Pappa was released by Heerenveen as they dissolved his contract to make room on their roster for the Hungarian Szabolcs Varga.

=== Seattle Sounders FC (2014–2016) ===
Pappa was released by Heerenveen and entered the MLS Allocation process, being selected by the Seattle Sounders FC who had the first pick. He was officially given the number 10 jersey last worn by Mauro Rosales on 12 February 2014. On 25 October, Pappa came off the bench and scored twice as the Sounders defeated the Los Angeles Galaxy 2−0 to clinch the Supporters' Shield, as the best club in MLS during the regular season.

=== Colorado Rapids (2016) ===
On March 1, Pappa was traded to Colorado Rapids in exchange for allocation money.

=== Return to Guatemala ===
In January 2017, Pappa returned to the team of his youth, C.S.D. Municipal. His contract expired on 30 June 2017. Pappa then looked for a club abroad, however, without success. He then returned to Municipal in September 2017.

In July 2018, it was reported that Pappa had joined Deportivo Petapa. On 30 August Pappa also said that he had reached an agreement with the club but in September 2018, Petapas head coach said that there was no agreement with Pappa and that he wouldn't be a part of the squad. He then joined Club Xelajú MC on 8 October 2019.

In the summer 2019, Pappa signed with Deportivo Mixco. On 24 October 2019 the club confirmed, that they had terminated Pappa's contract. Pappa played 12 games and scored a goal in 726 minutes of play.

On 16 March 2020, Deportivo San Pedro announced the signing of 31-year old Pappa.

== International career ==
Pappa has represented Guatemala at the U17, U20, U21 and U23 levels, and played for Guatemala at the U23 level in the qualifying tournament for the 2008 Beijing Olympics, in which they finished in fourth place after being one penalty shootout away from qualifying to the Olympic Tournament.

Pappa earned his first cap for the senior national team on 20 August 2008 in a 0–1 World Cup qualifying loss to the United States, appearing as a substitute. He scored his first goal for Guatemala on 15 October 2008 against Cuba. He participated at the UNCAF Nations Cup 2009 and at the 2011 Gold Cup, where he scored the second goal of a 4–0 win against Grenada.

During 2014 World Cup qualification, he scored the first goal of a 4–0 win against Saint Vincent and the Grenadines during the 2nd round, and in the third round, he scored from a direct free kick to equalize 1–1 at home against the United States.

At the 2014 Copa Centroamericana, Pappa helped Guatemala to a runner-up finish and qualification for the 2015 CONCACAF Gold Cup. He scored four goals in four matches en route to winning the tournament's Golden Boot as its top scorer and the Golden Ball as its best player.

== Career statistics ==
=== International ===
Scores and results list. Guatemala's goal tally first.

#	Date	Venue	Opponent	Score	Result	Competition
1	15 October 2008	Estadio Pedro Marrero, Havana, Cuba	Cuba	1–1	1–2	2010 FIFA World Cup qualification
2	3 March 2010	Memorial Coliseum, Los Angeles, United States	El Salvador	1–0	2–1	Friendly
3	13 June 2011	Red Bull Arena, Harrison, United States	Grenada	2–0	4–0	2011 CONCACAF Gold Cup
4	2 September 2011	Estadio Mateo Flores, Guatemala City, Guatemala	Saint Vincent and the Grenadines	1–0	4–0	2014 FIFA World Cup qualification
5	12 June 2012	Estadio Mateo Flores, Guatemala City, Guatemala	United States	1–1	1–1	2014 FIFA World Cup qualification
6	15 August 2012	RFK Stadium, Washington, D.C., United States	Paraguay	1–1	3–3	Friendly
7	3 September 2014	RFK Stadium, Washington, D.C., United States	El Salvador	1–0	2–1	2014 Copa Centroamericana
8	3 September 2014	RFK Stadium, Washington, D.C., United States	El Salvador	2–0	2–1	2014 Copa Centroamericana
9	10 September 2014	BBVA Compass Stadium, Houston, United States	Honduras	1–0	2–0	2014 Copa Centroamericana
10	10 September 2014	BBVA Compass Stadium, Houston, United States	Honduras	2–0	2–0	2014 Copa Centroamericana
11	13 October 2015	Los Angeles Memorial Coliseum, Los Angeles, United States	El Salvador	1–0	1–1	Friendly

== Honors ==
Municipal

- Liga Nacional de Guatemala: Clausura 2007, Clausura 2017

Seattle Sounders

- Supporters' Shield: 2014
- U.S. Open Cup: 2014

Individual

- MLS Goal of the Year Award: 2010
- Copa Centroamericana top goalscorer: 2014
- Copa Centroamericana best player: 2014

== Personal life ==
Pappa earned his U.S. green card in June 2015. This status also qualifies him as a domestic player for MLS roster purposes. In 2016, he was involved in an incident that resulted in Pappa being rushed to the hospital. When police arrived, girlfriend Stormy Keffeler was with him.

On 7 January 2020, Pappa was sentenced to 5-years in jail due to a domestic violence offence in his native Guatemala.
