= 2014 Copa Centroamericana =

International soccer tournament

Central American Cup Tigo 2014 USA

Tournament details
- Host country: United States
- Dates: 3 – 13 September
- Teams: 7 (from 1 sub-confederation)
- Venues: 4 (in 4 host cities)

Final positions
- Champions: Costa Rica (8th title)
- Runners-up: Guatemala
- Third place: Panama
- Fourth place: El Salvador

Tournament statistics
- Matches played: 12
- Goals scored: 27 (2.25 per match)
- Attendance: 305,784 (25,482 per match)
- Top scorer(s): (Guatemala) Marco Pappa (4 goals)
- Best player: (Guatemala) Marco Pappa
- Best goalkeeper: (Panama) Jaime Penedo
- Fair play award: Guatemala

The 2014 Copa Centroamericana (also known as the Central American Cup Tigo 2014 USA for sponsorship reasons) was the 13th Copa Centroamericana, the regional championship for men's national association football teams in Central America. It was organized by the Unión Centroamericana de Fútbol or UNCAF, and took place in the United States.

== Overview ==
In January 2013, UNCAF tentatively announced that the competition would be hosted in the United States, specifically in California and Texas. Eduardo Li, the President of the Costa Rican Football Federation and vice-president of UNCAF said that the competition is to celebrate 25 years of UNCAF. The announcement became official in January 2014, and it was announced that the competition would take place in September 2014.

Following the announcement, UNCAF President Rafael Tinocco said that September 2014 was chosen because "September is the month of independence" and that there are nine days in September on the FIFA International Match Calendar which would allow national associations to choose their first choice players. Tinocco also stated that the competition would be hosted outside of the Central American region, and hosted in United States due to the "money factor".

The top four teams would qualify for the 2015 CONCACAF Gold Cup. The fifth place team would advance to a play-off against the fifth place team from the 2014 Caribbean Cup tournament to determine which other nation will qualify for the 2015 CONCACAF Gold Cup. This is the first time that the two overall fifth-placed teams compete to qualify for the CONCACAF Gold Cup, previously five teams from Central America and four from the Caribbean have qualified for the Confederation's competition.

The winner of the tournament would qualify for the Copa América Centenario, a 16-team tournament of CONMEBOL and CONCACAF national teams to be held in the United States in 2016.

== FIFA calendar issue ==
Two of the four competition dates fall outside of the FIFA International Match Calendar's "international window" for September 2014. Any two dates between 1 and 9 September at least three days apart were allocated as possible fixture dates in the window, meaning that the fixtures that took place on 3 and 7 September would be able to have a first choice selection available as clubs would be unable to reject call-ups, while the fixtures that took place on 10 and 13 September (including the final) would require the players' clubs to agree that players could participate.

== Teams ==
All seven UNCAF member national teams participated in the tournament.

Team	UNCAF Nations Cup / Copa Centroamericana appearances	Previous best performance	FIFA Ranking at start of event
Belize	10th	Fourth Place (2013)	162
Costa Rica (Title holders)	13th	Champion (**1991**, 1997, **1999**, 2003, 2005, 2007, **2013**)	15
El Salvador	13th	Third Place (**1995**, 1997, 2001, 2003, 2013)	127
Guatemala	12th	Champion (2001)	134
Honduras	13th	Champion (**1993**, 1995, 2011)	43
Nicaragua	13th	Fifth Place (2009)	175
Panama	12th	Champion (2009)	63

Bold indicates that the corresponding team was hosting the event.

== Venues ==
In May and June 2014, UNCAF announced that the following venues would host the tournament:

- The RFK Memorial Stadium in Washington, D.C. hosted the three matches of the first day of group stage on 3 September.
- The Cotton Bowl in Dallas, Texas hosted the three matches of the second day of group stage on 7 September.
- The BBVA Compass Stadium in Houston, Texas hosted the three matches of the last day of group stage on 10 September.
- The Los Angeles Memorial Coliseum in Los Angeles, California hosted the final, third-place and fifth-place matches on 13 September.

Washington, D.C.	Dallas, Texas	Houston, Texas	Los Angeles, California
RFK Memorial Stadium	Cotton Bowl	BBVA Compass Stadium	Los Angeles Memorial Coliseum
38.889722°N 76.971667°W	32.779722°N 96.759722°W	29.752199°N 95.352415°W	34.014167°N 118.287778°W
Capacity: **19,467**†	Capacity: **92,100**	Capacity: **22,000**	Capacity: **93,607**
Location of the host cities of the 2014 Copa Centroamericana.

== Officials ==
The following officials were selected for the tournament:

Referees

- Roberto Moreno (Panama)
- Jeffrey Solís (Costa Rica)
- Héctor Rodríguez (Honduras)
- Joel Aguilar (El Salvador)
- Walter López (Guatemala)
- Roberto García (Mexico)
- Sandy Vásquez (Dominican Republic)
- Jair Marrufo (United States)

Assistant referees

- Daniel Williamson (Panama)
- Leonel Leal (Costa Rica)
- Octavio Jara (Costa Rica)
- Keytzel Corrales (Nicaragua)
- Oscar Omar Velasquez (Honduras)
- Juan Zumba (El Salvador)
- Gerson Lopez Castellanos (Guatemala)
- Adam Garner (United States)

== Group stage ==
The draw for the group stage was made on 29 January 2014. The schedule was announced on 17 July 2014. Changes to the schedule were made on 18 August.

=== Tiebreakers ===
The teams are ranked according to points (3 points for a win, 1 point for a tie, 0 points for a loss). If tied on points, tiebreakers are applied in the following order:

1. Greater number of points in matches between the tied teams.
2. Greater goal difference in matches between the tied teams (if more than two teams finish equal on points).
3. Greater number of goals scored in matches among the tied teams (if more than two teams finish equal on points).
4. Greater goal difference in all group matches.
5. Greater number of goals scored in all group matches.
6. Drawing of lots.

Legend
Group winners advance to the final and qualify for the 2015 CONCACAF Gold Cup
Group runners-up advance to the third place match and qualify for the 2015 CONCACAF Gold Cup
Group third-placed teams advance to the fifth place match

=== Group A ===
Pos	Team	Pld	W	D	L	GF	GA	GD	Pts	Qualification
1	Guatemala	3	3	0	0	6	2	+4	**9**	Final and Gold Cup
2	El Salvador	3	2	0	1	4	2	+2	**6**	Third place match and Gold Cup
3	Honduras	3	1	0	2	2	3	−1	**3**	Fifth place match
4	Belize	3	0	0	3	1	6	−5	**0**	

Source: CONCACAF
Rules for classification: Tiebreakers
3 September 2014
19:30 EDT

Honduras	2–0	Belize
James 35' (o.g.); Smith 37' (o.g.)	Report

RFK Memorial Stadium, Washington, D.C.
Attendance: 20,516
Referee: Sandy Vásquez (Dominican Republic)
3 September 2014
21:30 EDT

El Salvador	1–2	Guatemala
Burgos 69'	Report	Pappa 26', 64'

RFK Memorial Stadium, Washington, D.C.
Attendance: 20,516
Referee: Jair Marrufo (United States)

7 September 2014
18:00 CDT

Guatemala	2–1	Belize
C. Ruiz 26'; Ávila 51'	Report	McCaulay 80'

Cotton Bowl, Dallas, Texas
Attendance: 20,156
Referee: Roberto Moreno (Panama)
7 September 2014
20:00 CDT

Honduras	0–1	El Salvador
	Report	Menjivar 67'

Cotton Bowl, Dallas, Texas
Attendance: 20,156
Referee: Jeffrey Solís (Costa Rica)

10 September 2014
19:00 CDT

El Salvador	2–0	Belize
Burgos 48'; Alvarez 69'	Report

BBVA Compass Stadium, Houston, Texas
Attendance: 19,287
Referee: Sandy Vásquez (Dominican Republic)
10 September 2014
21:00 CDT

Honduras	0–2	Guatemala
	Report	Pappa 37', 80'

BBVA Compass Stadium, Houston, Texas
Attendance: 19,287
Referee: Roberto García (Mexico)

=== Group B ===
Pos	Team	Pld	W	D	L	GF	GA	GD	Pts	Qualification
1	Costa Rica	2	1	1	0	5	2	+3	**4**	Final and Gold Cup
2	Panama	2	1	1	0	4	2	+2	**4**	Third place match and Gold Cup
3	Nicaragua	2	0	0	2	0	5	−5	**0**	Fifth place match

Source: CONCACAF
Rules for classification: Tiebreakers
3 September 2014
17:30 EDT

Costa Rica	3–0	Nicaragua
Borges 39' (pen.); Ureña 49'; Venegas 86'	Report

RFK Memorial Stadium, Washington, D.C.
Attendance: 20,516
Referee: Héctor Rodríguez (Honduras)

7 September 2014
16:00 CDT

Costa Rica	2–2	Panama
Venegas 81'; Borges 87' (pen.)	Report	Pérez 51'; Nurse 71'

Cotton Bowl, Dallas, Texas
Attendance: 20,156
Referee: Joel Aguilar (El Salvador)

10 September 2014
17:00 CDT

Panama	2–0	Nicaragua
Pérez 81'; R. Torres 82'	Report

BBVA Compass Stadium, Houston, Texas
Attendance: 19,287
Referee: Walter López (Guatemala)

== Final stage ==
In the final stage, if a match is level at the end of normal playing time, the match is determined by a penalty shoot-out (no extra time is played).

=== Fifth place match ===
13 September 2014
15:00 PDT

Honduras	1–0	Nicaragua
Lozano 45+1'	Report

Los Angeles Memorial Coliseum, Los Angeles, California
Attendance: 41,969
Referee: Joel Aguilar (El Salvador)

Honduras advanced to represent the Central American Football Union at the 2015 CONCACAF Gold Cup qualification play-off, where they faced French Guiana, the 2014 Caribbean Cup fifth-placed team.

=== Third place match ===
13 September 2014
18:00 PDT

El Salvador	0–1	Panama
	Report	R. Torres 5'

Los Angeles Memorial Coliseum, Los Angeles, California
Attendance: 41,969
Referee: Jair Marrufo (United States)

=== Final ===
13 September 2014
21:00 PDT

Guatemala	1–2	Costa Rica
C. Ruiz 25' (pen.)	Report	B. Ruiz 29'; Bustos 56'

Los Angeles Memorial Coliseum, Los Angeles, California
Attendance: 41,969
Referee: Roberto Moreno (Panama)

**Guatemala**	**Costa Rica**

GK	1	Ricardo Jerez
DF	3	Elías Vásquez
DF	11	Rafael Morales	(substituted off) 67'
DF	4	Wilson Lalín
DF	5	Carlos Eduardo Gallardo	(substituted off) 90+1'
MF	8	Jean Márquez
MF	15	Sergio Trujillo	(substituted off) 84'
MF	10	José Manuel Contreras
MF	16	Marco Pappa
FW	19	Marvin Ávila
FW	20	Carlos Ruiz (c)
Substitutions:
FW	9	Jairo Arreola	(substituted on) 67'
MF	17	Nelson Miranda	(substituted on) 84'
FW	14	Kendell Herrarte	(substituted on) 90+1'
Manager:
(Argentina) Ivan Franco Sopegno

GK	18	Patrick Pemberton	(yellow card) 79'
DF	26	Pablo Salazar
DF	2	Jhonny Acosta	(yellow card) 90+5'
DF	19	Roy Miller
DF	17	David Myrie	(yellow card) 76'
MF	22	José Miguel Cubero
MF	23	Juan Bustos		(substituted off) 85'
MF	24	Johan Venegas		(substituted off) 81'
FW	21	David Ramírez		(substituted off) 90+1'
FW	15	Armando Alonso
FW	10	Bryan Ruiz (c)
Substitutions:
DF	3	Porfirio López		(substituted on) 81'
MF	8	Óscar Granados		(substituted on) 85'
FW	9	Jonathan Moya		(substituted on) 90+1'
Manager:
Paulo Wanchope

Costa Rica qualified for the Copa América Centenario.

2014 Copa Centroamericana winners

**Costa Rica**
**8th title**

== Awards ==
The following awards were given at the conclusion of the tournament:

Award	Winner
Golden Ball	(Guatemala) Marco Pappa
Golden Boot	(Guatemala) Marco Pappa
Golden Glove	(Panama) Jaime Penedo
Fair Play	Guatemala
Man of the Match – Final	(Costa Rica) Bryan Ruiz

== Goalscorers ==
4 goals

- (Guatemala) Marco Pappa

2 goals

- (Costa Rica) Celso Borges
- (Costa Rica) Johan Venegas
- (El Salvador) Rafael Burgos
- (Guatemala) Carlos Ruiz
- (Panama) Blas Pérez
- (Panama) Román Torres

1 goal

- (Belize) Deon McCaulay
- (Costa Rica) Juan Bustos
- (Costa Rica) Bryan Ruiz
- (Costa Rica) Marco Ureña
- (El Salvador) Arturo Alvarez
- (El Salvador) Richard Menjivar
- (Guatemala) Marvin Ávila
- (Honduras) Anthony Lozano
- (Panama) Roberto Nurse

Own goals

- (Belize) Jeromy James (playing against Honduras)
- (Belize) Elroy Smith (playing against Honduras)

== Final ranking ==
Rank	Team	Prize money (U.S. Dollars)
1st place, gold medalist(s)	Costa Rica	$60,000
2nd place, silver medalist(s)	Guatemala	$40,000
3rd place, bronze medalist(s)	Panama	$30,000
4	El Salvador	$25,000
5	Honduras	$20,000
6	Nicaragua	$15,000
7	Belize	$10,000
