= Juan Bustos (footballer) =

Costa Rican footballer (born 1992)

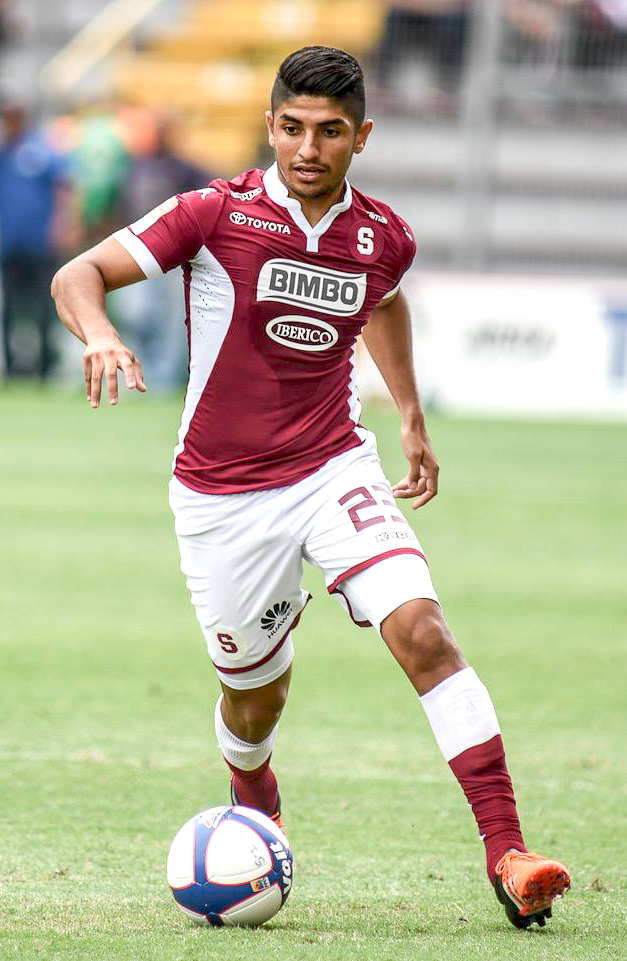

Personal information
- Full name: Juan Gabriel Bustos Golobio
- Date of birth: July 9, 1992 (age 34)
- Place of birth: San José, Costa Rica
- Height: 1.74 m (5 ft 8 1/2 in)
- Position: Midfielder

Senior career*
Years	Team	Apps	(Gls)
2010–2019	Deportivo Saprissa	168	(11)
2017	→ Cartaginés (loan)	17	(3)
2019	Herediano	8	(0)
2019–2020	San Carlos	14	(1)

International career^{‡}
2009	Costa Rica U17	3	(1)
2010–2011	Costa Rica U20	13	(1)
2014	Costa Rica	5	(2)
- * Club domestic league appearances and goals as of 25 May 2020 (UTC) ‡ National team caps and goals as of 17 November 2014 (UTC)

Juan Gabriel Bustos Golobio (born 9 July 1992) is a Costa Rican professional footballer who plays as a midfielder.

== International career ==
Bustos made his international debut against Nicaragua and scored his first goal against Guatemala.

== Career statistics ==
=== International ===
Appearances and goals by national team and year
National team	Year	Apps	Goals
Costa Rica	2014	5	2
Total		5	2

Scores and results list Costa Rica's goal tally first, score column indicates score after each Bustos goal.

List of international goals scored by Juan Bustos
No.	Date	Venue	Opponent	Score	Result	Competition
1	13 September 2014	Los Angeles Memorial Coliseum, Los Angeles, United States	Guatemala	2–1	2–1	2014 Copa Centroamericana
2	10 October 2014	Sultan Qaboos Sports Complex, Muscat, Oman	Oman	3–1	4–3	Friendly
