= Outline of El Salvador =

Country in Central America

The Flag of El Salvador

The Coat of arms of El Salvador

The location of El Salvador

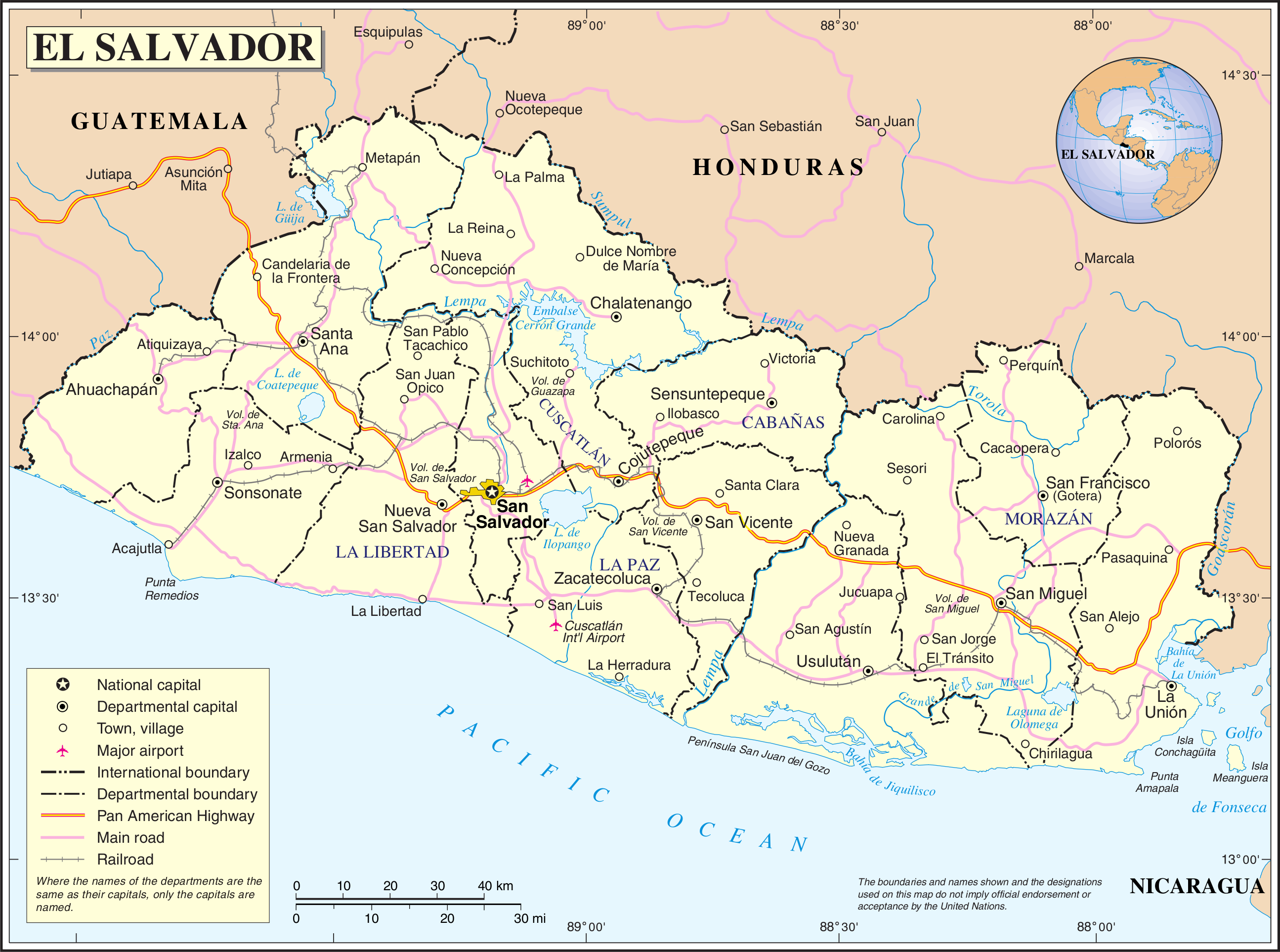
An enlargeable map of the Republic of El Salvador

The following outline is provided as an overview of and topical guide to El Salvador:

El Salvador, officially the Republic of El Salvador, is a country in Central America. It is bordered on the northeast by Honduras, on the northwest by Guatemala, and on the south by the Pacific Ocean. El Salvador's capital and largest city is San Salvador. El Salvador's population in 2024 was estimated to be 6 million.

== General reference ==
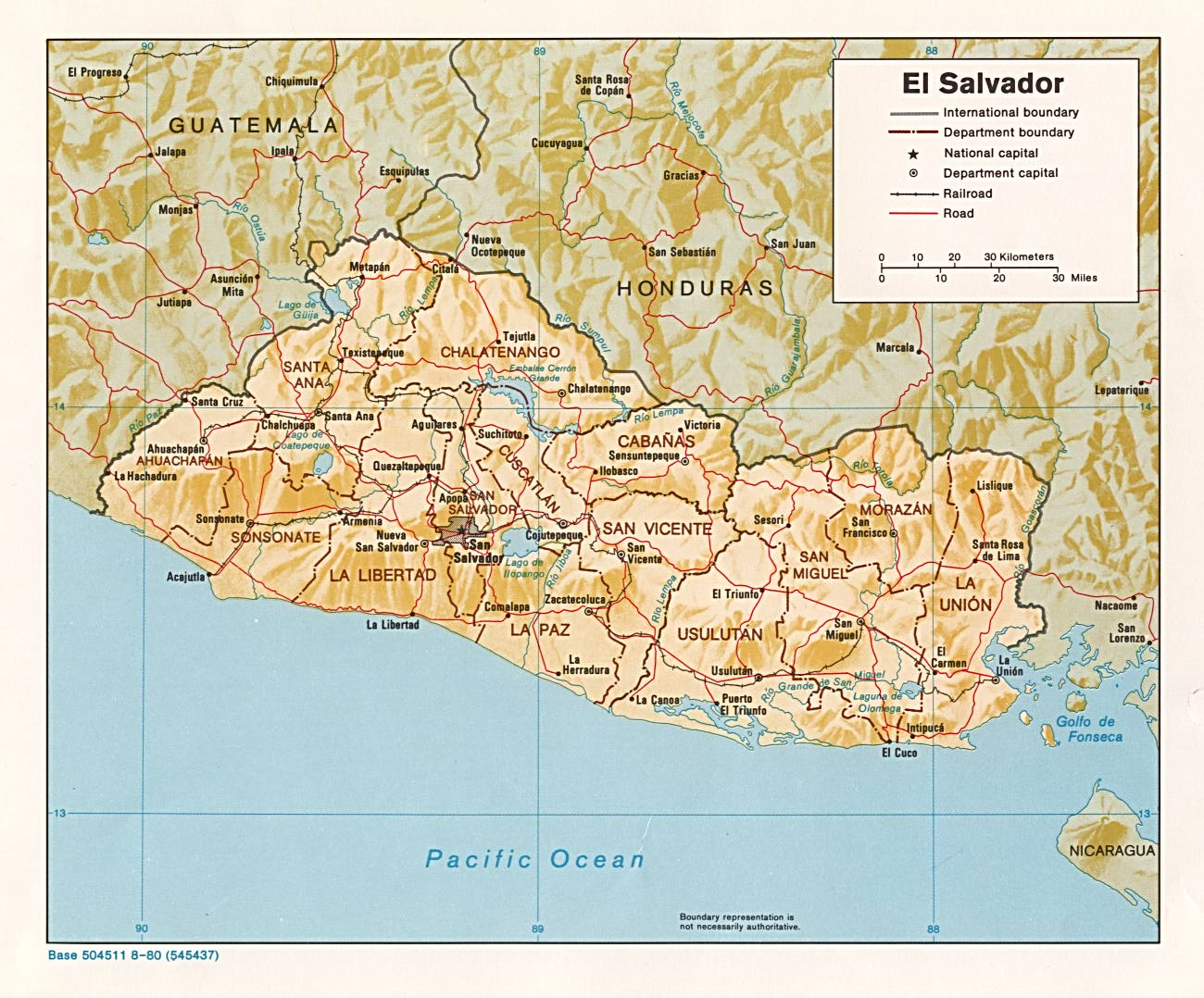
An enlargeable relief map of El Salvador

- Pronunciation: /ɛlˈsælvədɔːr/
- Common English country name: El Salvador
- Official English country name: The Republic of El Salvador
- Common endonym(s):
- Official endonym(s):
- Adjectival(s): Salvadoran
- Demonym(s):
- Etymology: In the early sixteenth century, Spanish conquistadors named this region "Provincia de San Salvador" ("Province of San Salvador"), which in 1824 was changed to "El Salvador".
- International rankings of El Salvador
- ISO country codes: SV, SLV, 222
- ISO region codes: See ISO 3166-2:SV
- Internet country code top-level domain: .sv

== Geography of El Salvador ==
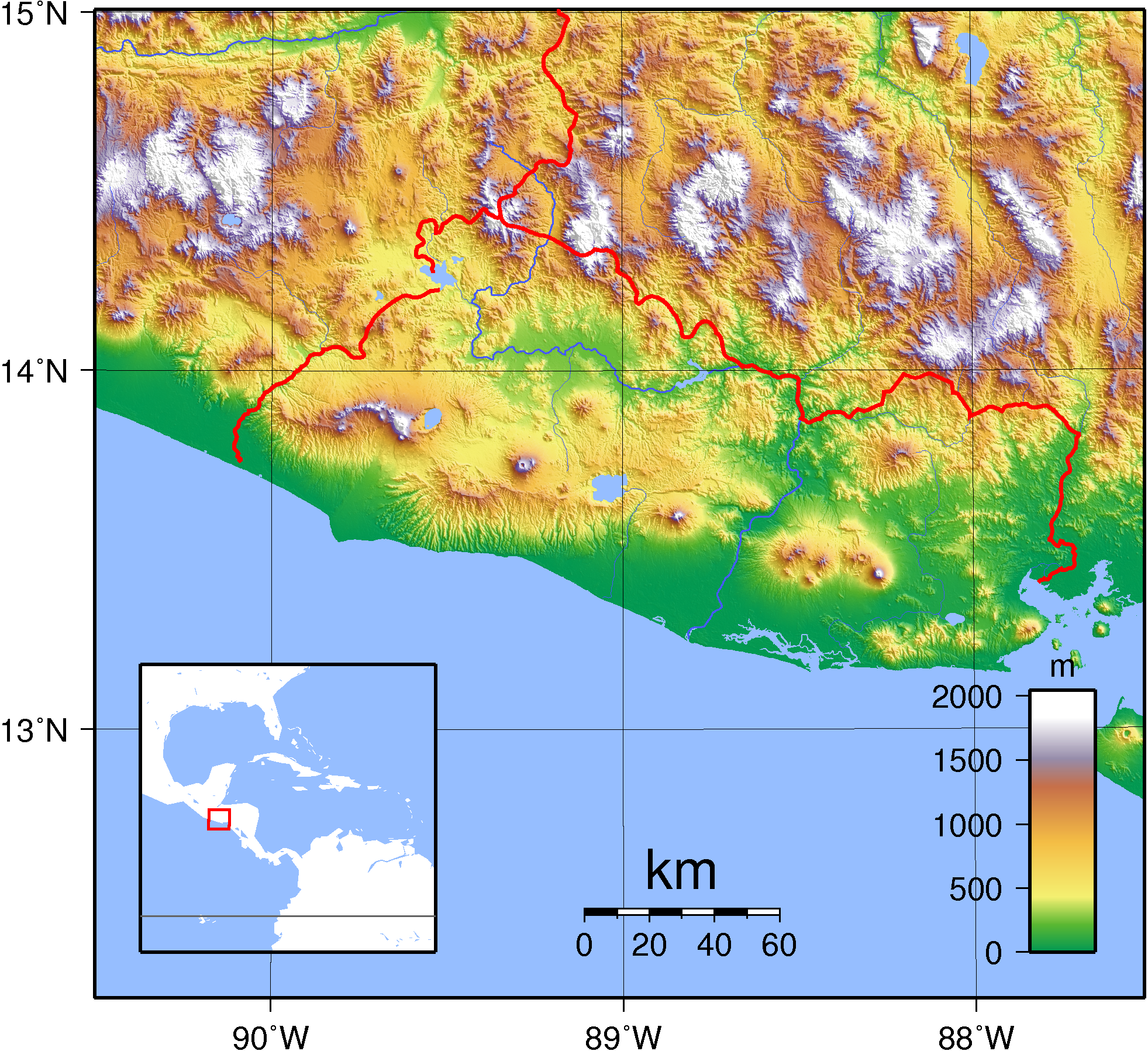
An enlargeable topographic map of El Salvador

- El Salvador is: a country
- Location:
  - Northern Hemisphere and Western Hemisphere
    - Americas
      - North America
        - Middle America
          - Central America
  - Latin America
  - Time zone: Central Standard Time (UTC-06)
  - Extreme points of El Salvador
    - High: Cerro El Pital 2,730 m (8,957 ft)
    - Low: North Pacific Ocean 0 m
  - Land boundaries: 545 km

Honduras 342 km
Guatemala 203 km

- Coastline: North Pacific Ocean 307 km

- Population of El Salvador: 6,857,000 - 98th most populous country
- Area of El Salvador: 21,040 km^{2}
- Atlas of El Salvador

=== Environment of El Salvador ===
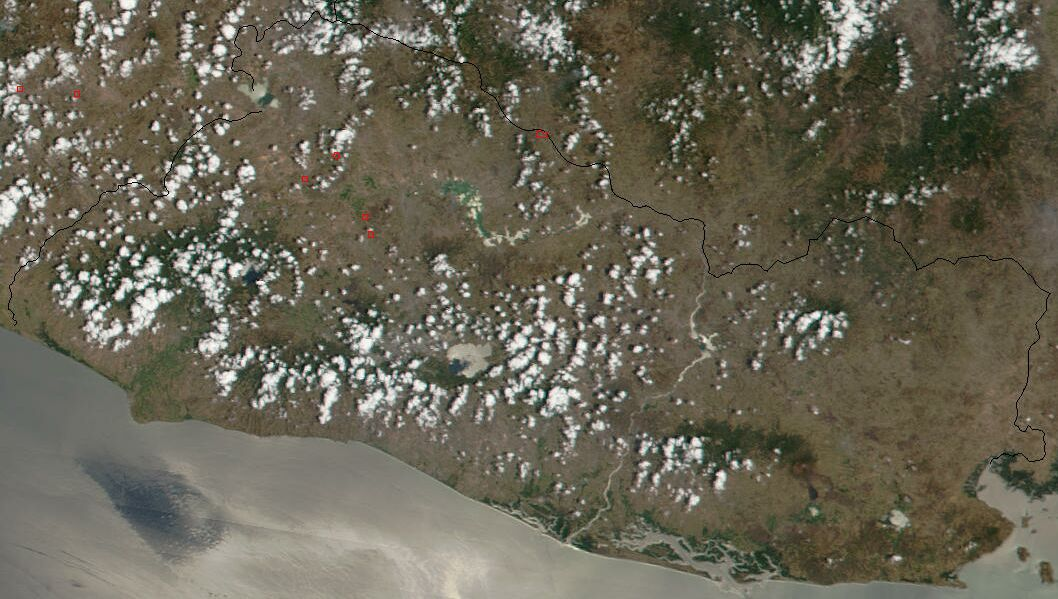
An enlargeable satellite image of El Salvador

- Climate of El Salvador
- Wildlife of El Salvador
  - Fauna of El Salvador
    - Birds of El Salvador
    - Mammals of El Salvador

==== Natural geographic features of El Salvador ====
- Islands of El Salvador
- Mountains of El Salvador
  - Volcanoes in El Salvador
- Rivers of El Salvador
- World Heritage Sites in El Salvador

=== Regions of El Salvador ===
==== Administrative divisions of El Salvador ====
===== Departments of El Salvador =====
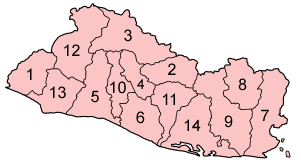
Departments of El Salvador

El Salvador is divided into 14 Departments. Their names, abbreviations, (and capitals) are:

1. AH Ahuachapán (Ahuachapán)
2. CA Cabañas (Sensuntepeque)
3. CH Chalatenango (Chalatenango)
4. CU Cuscatlán (Cojutepeque)
5. LI La Libertad (Santa Tecla)
6. PA La Paz (Zacatecoluca)
7. UN La Unión (La Unión)
8. MO Morazán (San Francisco Gotera)
9. SM San Miguel (San Miguel)
10. SS San Salvador (San Salvador)
11. SV San Vicente (San Vicente)
12. SA Santa Ana (Santa Ana)
13. SO Sonsonate (Sonsonate)
14. US Usulután (Usulután)

===== Municipalities of El Salvador =====
Municipalities of El Salvador

- Capital of El Salvador: San Salvador
- Cities of El Salvador

=== Demography of El Salvador ===
Demographics of El Salvador

== Government and politics of El Salvador ==
Politics of El Salvador

- Form of government: presidential representative democratic republic
- Capital of El Salvador: San Salvador
- Elections in El Salvador
- Political parties in El Salvador

=== Branches of the government of El Salvador ===
Government of El Salvador

==== Executive branch of the government of El Salvador ====
- Head of state: President of El Salvador, Nayib Bukele
- Head of government: President of El Salvador, Nayib Bukele
- Cabinet of El Salvador

==== Legislative branch of the government of El Salvador ====
- Legislative Assembly of El Salvador (unicameral)

==== Judicial branch of the government of El Salvador ====
Court system of El Salvador

- Supreme Court of El Salvador

=== Foreign relations of El Salvador ===
Foreign relations of El Salvador

- Diplomatic missions in El Salvador
- Diplomatic missions of El Salvador

==== International organization membership ====
The Republic of El Salvador is a member of:

- Agency for the Prohibition of Nuclear Weapons in Latin America and the Caribbean (OPANAL)
- Central American Bank for Economic Integration (BCIE)
- Central American Common Market (CACM)
- Central American Integration System (SICA)
- Food and Agriculture Organization (FAO)
- Group of 77 (G77)
- Inter-American Development Bank (IADB)
- International Atomic Energy Agency (IAEA)
- International Bank for Reconstruction and Development (IBRD)
- International Chamber of Commerce (ICC)
- International Civil Aviation Organization (ICAO)
- International Criminal Police Organization (Interpol)
- International Development Association (IDA)
- International Federation of Red Cross and Red Crescent Societies (IFRCS)
- International Finance Corporation (IFC)
- International Fund for Agricultural Development (IFAD)
- International Labour Organization (ILO)
- International Maritime Organization (IMO)
- International Monetary Fund (IMF)
- International Olympic Committee (IOC)
- International Organization for Migration (IOM)
- International Organization for Standardization (ISO) (correspondent)
- International Red Cross and Red Crescent Movement (ICRM)
- International Telecommunication Union (ITU)
- International Telecommunications Satellite Organization (ITSO)
- International Trade Union Confederation (ITUC)
- Inter-Parliamentary Union (IPU)
- Multilateral Investment Guarantee Agency (MIGA)
- Nonaligned Movement (NAM) (observer)
- Organisation for the Prohibition of Chemical Weapons (OPCW)
- Organization of American States (OAS)
- Permanent Court of Arbitration (PCA)
- Rio Group (RG)
- Unión Latina
- United Nations (UN)
- United Nations Conference on Trade and Development (UNCTAD)
- United Nations Educational, Scientific, and Cultural Organization (UNESCO)
- United Nations Industrial Development Organization (UNIDO)
- United Nations Interim Force in Lebanon (UNIFIL)
- United Nations Mission for the Referendum in Western Sahara (MINURSO)
- United Nations Mission in Liberia (UNMIL)
- United Nations Mission in the Sudan (UNMIS)
- United Nations Operation in Cote d'Ivoire (UNOCI)
- Universal Postal Union (UPU)
- World Confederation of Labour (WCL)
- World Customs Organization (WCO)
- World Federation of Trade Unions (WFTU)
- World Health Organization (WHO)
- World Intellectual Property Organization (WIPO)
- World Meteorological Organization (WMO)
- World Tourism Organization (UNWTO)
- World Trade Organization (WTO)

=== Law and order in El Salvador ===
- Constitution of El Salvador
- Crime in El Salvador
  - Illegal drug trade in El Salvador
- Human rights in El Salvador (see Category:Human rights in El Salvador
  - Abortion in El Salvador
  - LGBT rights in El Salvador
- Law enforcement in El Salvador

=== Military of El Salvador ===
Military of El Salvador

- Command
  - Commander-in-chief:
- Armed Forces of El Salvador
  - Salvadoran Army
  - Navy of El Salvador
  - Salvadoran Air Force

== History of El Salvador ==
History of El Salvador

== Culture of El Salvador ==
Culture of El Salvador

- Cuisine of El Salvador
- Languages of El Salvador
- National symbols of El Salvador
  - Coat of arms of El Salvador
  - Flag of El Salvador
  - National anthem of El Salvador
- Prostitution in El Salvador
- Religion in El Salvador
  - Buddhism in El Salvador
  - Christianity in El Salvador
  - Islam in El Salvador
  - Judaism in El Salvador
- World Heritage Sites in El Salvador

=== Art in El Salvador ===
- Literature of El Salvador
- Music of El Salvador

=== Sports in El Salvador ===
==== Specific sports ====
- Baseball in El Salvador
  - El Salvador national baseball team
- Cricket in El Salvador
  - El Salvador national cricket team
- Football in El Salvador
  - El Salvador national beach soccer team
  - El Salvador national football team
    - El Salvador national football team season 2009
    - El Salvador national football team season 2010
    - El Salvador national football team season 2011
    - El Salvador national football team season 2012
    - El Salvador national football team season 2013
  - El Salvador national football team kit
  - El Salvador national under-17 football team
  - El Salvador national under-20 football team
  - El Salvador national under-21 football team
  - El Salvador national under-23 football team
  - El Salvador women's national football team
- Rugby League in El Salvador
  - El Salvador national rugby league team
- Rugby Union in El Salvador
  - El Salvador national rugby union team

==== General sports competitions ====
- El Salvador at the Olympics
  - El Salvador at the 1968 Summer Olympics
  - El Salvador at the 1972 Summer Olympics
  - El Salvador at the 1984 Summer Olympics
  - El Salvador at the 1988 Summer Olympics
  - El Salvador at the 1992 Summer Olympics
  - El Salvador at the 1996 Summer Olympics
  - El Salvador at the 2000 Summer Olympics
  - El Salvador at the 2004 Summer Olympics
  - El Salvador at the 2008 Summer Olympics
- El Salvador at the Pan American Games
  - El Salvador at the 2003 Pan American Games
  - El Salvador at the 2007 Pan American Games
  - El Salvador at the 2011 Pan American Games
- El Salvador at the Paralympics
  - El Salvador at the 2008 Summer Paralympics
- El Salvador at the 2006 FEI World Equestrian Games
- El Salvador at the 2009 World Championships in Athletics
- El Salvador at the 2010 Central American and Caribbean Games
- El Salvador at the 2010 Summer Youth Olympics

== Economy and infrastructure of El Salvador ==
Economy of El Salvador

- Economic rank, by nominal GDP (2007): 93rd (ninety-third)
- Agriculture in El Salvador
  - Coffee production in El Salvador
- Banking in El Salvador
  - Central Reserve Bank of El Salvador
- Communications in El Salvador
  - Internet in El Salvador
  - Internet in El Salvador
- Companies of El Salvador
- Energy in El Salvador
  - Electricity sector in El Salvador
  - Geothermal power in El Salvador
- Currency of El Salvador: Dollar
  - ISO 4217: USD
- El Salvador Stock Exchange
- Transportation in El Salvador
  - Airports in El Salvador
  - Rail transport in El Salvador
- Water supply and sanitation in El Salvador

== Education in El Salvador ==
Education in El Salvador

== See also ==
El Salvador

- List of El Salvador-related topics
- List of international rankings
- Member state of the United Nations
- Outline of geography
- Outline of North America
- 1982 El Salvador earthquake
- January 2001 El Salvador earthquake
- February 2001 El Salvador earthquake
- 2009 El Salvador floods and mudslides
