= Armando Calderón Sol =

President of El Salvador from 1994 to 1999

His Excellency Armando Calderón Sol
- Calderón Sol in 2009

38th President of El Salvador
- In office 1 June 1994 – 1 June 1999
- Vice President: Enrique Borgo Bustamante
- Preceded by: Alfredo Cristiani
- Succeeded by: Francisco Flores

119th Mayor of San Salvador
- In office 1 May 1988 – 1 May 1994
- Preceded by: José Antonio Morales Ehrlich
- Succeeded by: Mario Valiente

Deputy of the Legislative Assembly of El Salvador from San Salvador
- In office 1 May 1985 – 1 May 1988

President of the National Executive Council of the Nationalist Republican Alliance
- In office 1988–1994
- Succeeded by: Juan José Domenech

Personal details
- Born: 24 June 1948 San Salvador, El Salvador
- Died: 9 October 2017 (aged 69) Houston, Texas, U.S.
- Resting place: San José de la Montaña, San Salvador, El Salvador
- Party: Nationalist Republican Alliance (from 1981)
- Other political affiliations: Salvadoran Nationalist Movement (1979–1981)
- Spouse: Elizabeth Aguirre de Calderón
- Children: 3
- Relatives: Milena Calderón Sol (sister)
- Education: Externado San José
- Alma mater: University of El Salvador
- Occupation: Politician, lawyer, businessman

Armando Calderón Sol (24 June 1948 – 9 October 2017) was a Salvadoran politician, lawyer, and businessman who served as the 38th President of El Salvador from 1994 to 1999 as a member of the Nationalist Republican Alliance. He also served as Mayor of San Salvador, the country's capital city, from 1988 to 1994. He was El Salvador's first president elected after the end of the Salvadoran Civil War (1979–1992).

Calderón Sol studied at the University of El Salvador and became a lawyer. He became politically active in 1979 as a member of the Salvadoran Nationalist Movement (MNS) with which he allegedly had links to far-right death squads. In 1981, he was a founding member of the Nationalist Republican Alliance (ARENA) and served on its National Executive Council (COENA). He served as a deputy of the Legislative Assembly from 1985 to 1988. From 1988 to 1994, Calderón Sol was both the mayor of San Salvador and the leader of ARENA.

Calderón Sol won the 1994 presidential election in the second round with over 68% of the vote. During his presidency, he focused on privatizing government owned industry, criminal justice reform, and leading El Salvador in its post-civil war transition period. His government received criticism for a controversial increase of the value-added tax in 1995 and for facing violence from civil war veterans dissatisfied with the terms of the Chapultepec Peace Accords, which Calderón Sol helped negotiate as mayor of San Salvador. He remained active in politics after he left the presidency. Calderón Sol died in Houston, Texas, United States in 2017 to lung cancer and he was buried in San Salvador.

== Early life and education ==
Armando Calderón Sol was born on 24 June 1948 in San Salvador, El Salvador. Calderón Sol attended the Externado San José school in San Salvador for his primary and secondary education. He graduated as a Bachelor of Arts and Science. He later attended the University of El Salvador where he completed his Doctorate of Jurisprudence and Social Sciences in 1977. After Calderón Sol's graduation, he operated his own legal practice and ran businesses.

== Early political career ==
Calderón Sol became active in Salvadoran politics in 1979 shortly after the overthrow of General Carlos Humberto Romero, the president of El Salvador. That year, he was recruited as a member of the Salvadoran Nationalist Movement (MNS) by Alfredo Mena Lagos, one its founders. The MNS opposed the reformist Revolutionary Government Junta (JRG) established after the 1979 coup.

The MNS had connections with far-right death squads, and Calderón Sol allegedly had links to some groups. According to Lieutenant Isidro López Sibrián, a death squad member, Calderón Sol was involved in bombings committed against Ministry of Agriculture facilities to protest agrarian reforms implemented by the JRG. According to William G. Walker, the United States ambassador to El Salvador from 1988 to 1992, Major Roberto D'Aubuisson plotted the kidnapping of the president of the Salvadoran Football Federation in Calderón Sol's home in 1981 but that there was no evidence that Calderón Sol himself was involved.

In 1981, Calderón Sol was a founding member of the Nationalist Republican Alliance (ARENA), a political party formed by the merger of the MNS and the Broad National Front (FAN). He was the party's legal affairs director as a member of its first National Executive Council (COENA). In 1985, Calderón Sol was elected as a deputy of the Legislative Assembly of El Salvador from the San Salvador Department. He served as the leader of ARENA's legislative bloc. In 1986, he was appointed as the vice president of the National Directive Board of the Inter-Party Union in Geneva, Switzerland.

Calderón Sol was elected as the mayor of San Salvador in 1988. That same year, he was also elected as ARENA's party president and the chairman of COENA, the first president of the Salvadoran Institute for Municipal Development, and the president of the Corporation of Municipalities of the Republic of El Salvador. Calderón Sol was re-elected as president of ARENA and COENA in 1990. As mayor, Calderón Sol implemented popular social projects that won him re-election in 1991. He also engaged in negotiations between the Salvadoran government, then led by President Alfredo Cristiani (a member of ARENA) and the rebel Farabundo Martí National Liberation Front (FMLN). When Calderón Sol endorsed the 1991 New York Agreement, far-right elements within ARENA accused Calderón Sol of being a "traitor" for negotiating with the FMLN that had been fighting a civil war against the government throughout the 1980s. Calderón Sol's negotiations helped lead to the signing of the Chapultepec Peace Accords on 16 January 1992 that ended the Salvadoran Civil War.

== President of El Salvador ==
=== 1994 presidential election ===
Maps showing the percent of the vote which Calderón Sol won in each Salvadoran department during the first (top) and second rounds (bottom) of the 1994 presidential election

In 1993, Calderón Sol named himself as ARENA's presidential candidate for the 1994 presidential election. Critics within ARENA accused him of stealing the party's nomination process while Calderón Sol argues that there was no real competition during the primary process against him. Prior to the election, a United States government official told The Washington Post that the U.S. government was worried that Calderón Sol's victory would lead to his allies resuming political violence as Calderón Sol's rhetoric was more hardline than Cristiani's. The official remarked that "[Calderón Sol] has all the bad qualities that D'Aubuisson had, but none of the latter's redeeming qualities".

Calderón Sol won the first round with 651,632 votes (49.11%) and faced Rubén Zamora of the FMLN–Democratic Convergence coalition in the second round. There, Calderón Sol defeated Zamora with 818,264 votes (68.35%). Calderón Sol was the first Salvadoran president elected after the end of the civil war. He stepped down as ARENA's president after his election as President of El Salvador. Calderón Sol became President of El Salvador on 1 June 1994 succeeding Cristiani. Enrique Borgo Bustamante was Calderón Sol's vice president.

=== Economic policies ===
During Calderón Sol's inaugural address, he promised to promote public participation in El Salvador's economy and decentralize government programs by strengthening the country's municipal governments. Calderón Sol continued the neoliberal National Economic and Social Development Plan implemented by Cristiani that aimed to privatize state-run industries to both reduce the government's involvement in the economy and gradually reduce poverty. He believed that industrial and commercial development would benefit the country's population. El Salvador's telecommunications and electricity companies were privatized in 1996 and 1997, respectively, but increased rates after privatization led to Calderón Sol issuing subsidies to both industries. He also privatized the country's pension system and established the Ministry of the Environment and Natural Resources in 1997.

In 1995, Calderón Sol announced the "Economic Platform for Social Development" that aimed to fix the exchange rate between the Salvadoran colón and the United States dollar, reduce tariffs, and maintain fiscal discipline. Of these, only the reduction of tariffs was successful as both imports and exports grew by over US$1 billion each. The exchange rate between the colón and the dollar was never fixed. To achieve fiscal discipline, Calderón Sol got the Legislative Assembly to approve an increase of the value-added tax (VAT) from 10% to 13%. The VAT increase was approved when eight dissident FMLN deputies led by Joaquín Villalobos voted in favor of the increase. They later left the FMLN and formed the Democratic Party in what Calderón Sol described as his best "political move". The 30% VAT increase was highly controversial. It was increased to allow the government to raise more funds and cut its fiscal deficit, but from 1994 to 1998, El Salvador's fiscal deficit increased from 0.7% of the country's gross domestic product (GDP) to 2.1% The VAT increase politically damaged ARENA electorally as the party lost 11 seats during the 1997 legislative election and its vote share fell by almost 10%. Tax evasion was also common in El Salvador's economy during Calderón Sol's presidency, and former members of Calderón Sol's government claimed that his government was engaged in several backroom deals.

=== Social policies ===
Calderón Sol promised to spend up to 50% of the national budget on social programs in education, health, housing, pension reform, and human development in his Social Development Plan. In 1995, he announced the Ten-Year Plan for Educational Reform that called for expanding access to schooling for young Salvadorans. Despite this promise, spending only ever reached around 25% of the budget each year. In 1994, bus workers blockaded the Pan-American Highway near San Miguel demanding higher bus fares. Calderón Sol ordered the PNC to forcibly clear the blockade resulting in several bus workers being killed.

=== Justice reforms ===
During Calderón Sol's inaugural address, he promised to "forge a peace that will be an example for the world" ("hacer una paz que sea un ejemplo para el mundo") and to uphold the Chapultepec Peace Accords. He stated his goal was to cement a legacy of democracy in El Salvador and distance the country from its past authoritarian and military governments. Calderón Sol was responsible for overseeing the demobilization of over 55,000 civil war combatants from both the Armed Forces of El Salvador and the FMLN, but he faced opposition from those who resisted demobilization. A few months into his term, former members of the National Police robbed the Commercial Bank in San Salvador for 1.5 million colones, killing 4 people. On 26 September 1994, hundreds of former soldiers attacked the Legislative Assembly and held 29 deputies hostage for three days while demanding financial compensation for civil war veterans.

Calderón Sol also oversaw the expansion of the National Civil Police (PNC), the new police force created by the Chapultepec Peace Accords. He was accused of violating the terms of the peace accords by allowing an excessive number of former armed forces personnel into the PNC's ranks. He appointed Rodrigo Ávila Avilés as the PNC's director. In 1996, Calderón Sol approved a law passed by ARENA in the Legislative Assembly that gave mayors immunity from criminal prosecution. He defended the law, arguing that violators of the law must be punished but that incumbent mayors should not be subject to "political intrigue and filth" ("intriga y suciedad política"). He referred to those calling for him to veto the law as "political pigs" ("cerdos políticos"), but the Presidential Communications Office walked this back and claimed that Calderón Sol actually said "pseudo-politicians" ("seudos políticos"). In fact, during Calderón Sol's presidency, he only exerted his veto power 3 or 4 times.

According to the Proceso magazine published by the Central American University (UCA), El Salvador suffered a stagnant economy and high unemployment during Calderón Sol's presidency due to high crime rates. To curb violence, Calderón Sol implemented stricter penalties for those convicted of violent crimes. In 1996, the Legislative Assembly approved the reinstatement of capital punishment for those convicted of murder, rape, and kidnapping, but since this required an amendment to the country's constitution, this was never implemented. Instead, a maximum prison sentence of 50 years was implemented. ARENA criticized the implementation of a criminal justice reforms in 1998, with writers for the El Diario de Hoy newspaper describing the acquittal of individuals for misconduct by police officers, prosecutors, or judges as "absurd".

=== Foreign policy ===
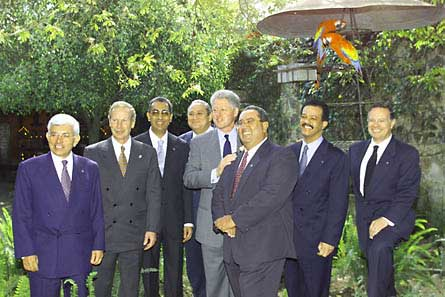
Calderón Sol (fourth from left) with U.S. president Bill Clinton and other Central American leaders on 11 March 1999

In 1995, Calderón Sol received Boutros Boutros-Ghali, the secretary-general of the United Nations, in El Salvador as Boutros-Ghali visited to oversee the implementation of the Chapultepec Peace Accords. That same year, the United Nations Observer Mission in El Salvador came to an end.

Calderón Sol received U.S. president Bill Clinton in El Salvador on 10 March 1999. During the visit, Calderón Sol asked Clinton to delay the deportation of Salvadorans back to El Salvador and to grant amnesty to those in the United States illegally. The following day, Calderón Sol attended a summit in Antigua Guatemala, Guatemala with Clinton, Guatemalan president Álvaro Arzú, Honduran president Carlos Roberto Flores, Costa Rican president Miguel Ángel Rodríguez, Dominican president Leonel Fernández, and Belizean prime minister Said Musa.

== Post-presidency ==
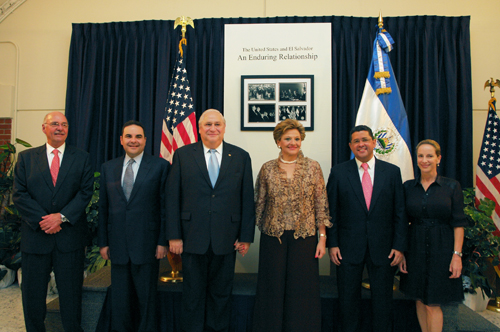
Calderón Sol (third from left) with former ARENA presidents Alfredo Cristiani, Antonio Saca and Francisco Flores in 2009

At the end of Calderón Sol's presidency in 1999, an opinion poll conducted by UCA's Institute of Public Opinion (IUDOP) found that he had a final approval rating of 58.9%, the highest of his presidency. Another poll conducted by IUDOP found that two-thirds of Salvadorans considered their economic situation and safety from crime to have either not changed or deteriorated during Calderón Sol's presidency. He left office on 1 June 1999 and was succeeded by Francisco Flores, another member of ARENA. After Calderón Sol left the presidency, he remained involved in Salvadoran politics. At some point, he was a deputy of the Central American Parliament (PARLACEN) representing El Salvador, ARENA's honorary president, and the president of the Union of Latin American Parties.

Calderón Sol initially supported and compared himself to his successor Flores. He praised Flores' dollarization of the Salvadoran economy, claiming that he wanted to do the same during his presidency but that he did not believe it was popular enough. Eventually, however, Calderón Sol came to oppose Flores. Calderón Sol was critical of a 2010 apology issued by President Mauricio Funes (an FMLN member) that was made "in the name of the state of El Salvador" for atrocities committed by the Salvadoran government during the civil war such as the El Mozote massacre. Calderón Sol remarked that "the State should never apologize" ("el Estado jamás debió pedir perdón").

== Personal life ==
Calderón Sol married Elizabeth Aguirre. The couple had three children. After Calderón Sol left the presidency, he pledged to focus his time on his family.

== Death ==
In September 2017, Calderón Sol's sister Milena stated that Calderón Sol had been chronically ill with lung cancer for a year. That month, he was admitted to an intensive care unit at a hospital in Houston, Texas, United States. He died there on 9 October 2017 at 12:30 a.m. CDT. His body was returned to El Salvador on 12 October and he was buried at the San José de la Montaña Church in San Salvador on 14 October.

The day after Calderón Sol's death, the Legislative Assembly declared three days of national mourning at ARENA's request. The National Party-led Honduran government also declared three days of national mourning the day prior as the party described Calderón Sol as "always demonstrating himself as a friend of Honduras" ("siempre demostró ser amigo de Honduras").

== Awards and honors ==
During Calderón Sol's presidency, he was awarded the Order of General José Dolores Estrada, Battle of San Jacinto by Nicaragua, the grand cross of the Order of the Sun of Peru by Peru, the collar of the Order of Isabella the Catholic by Spain, and the grand cordon of the Order of Brilliant Jade by Taiwan. He also received an honorary doctorate from Sōka University in Japan and the George F. Hixson Award from Kiwanis Club International in the United States.

== Electoral history ==
Year	Office	Party	Main opponent and party		Votes for Calderón Sol				Result	Swing	Ref.
Year	Office	Party	Main opponent and party		Total	%	P.	±%	Result	Swing	Ref.
1985	Deputy of the Legislative Assembly	ARENA	N/A					N/A	Won	N/A	
1988	Mayor of San Salvador	ARENA					1st	N/A	Won	Gain	
1991	Mayor of San Salvador	ARENA					1st		Won	Hold	
1994	President of El Salvador	ARENA	Rubén Zamora	FMLN–CVD	641,108	49.11	1st	N/A	Runoff		
1994	President of El Salvador	ARENA	Rubén Zamora	FMLN–CVD	818,264	68.35	1st	N/A	Won	Hold	

Political offices
Preceded by José Antonio Morales Ehrlich	Mayor of San Salvador; 1988–1994	Succeeded by Mario Valiente
Preceded by Alfredo Cristiani	President of El Salvador; 1994–1999	Succeeded by Francisco Flores Pérez
Party political offices
Preceded by ?	President of the Nationalist Republican Alliance; 1988–1994	Succeeded by Juan José Domenech
Preceded by Alfredo Cristiani	ARENA nominee for President of El Salvador; 1994	Succeeded by Francisco Flores
