= 1994 Salvadoran general election =

- Registered: 2,737,743
- Presidential election
- 20 March 1994 (first round); 24 April 1994 (second round)
- Turnout: 52.27% (first round) ▼2.43pp 45.51% (second round)
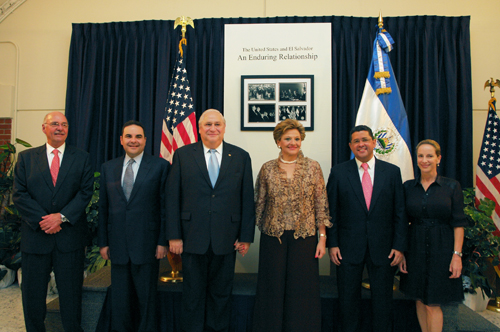

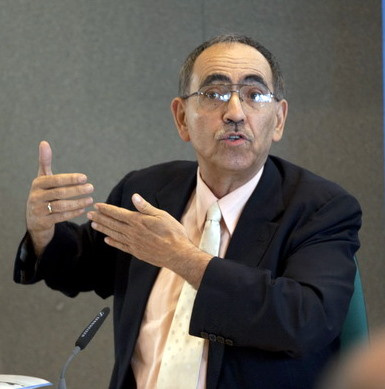
Nominee	Armando Calderón Sol	Rubén Zamora
Party	ARENA	FMLN
Running mate	Enrique Borgo Bustamante	Francisco Roberto Lima Rivera
Popular vote	818,264	378,980
Percentage	68.35%	31.65%
President before election
Alfredo Cristiani
ARENA
Elected President
Armando Calderón Sol
ARENA
- Legislative election
- 20 March 1994
- All 84 seats in the Legislative Assembly; 43 seats needed for a majority
Party	Vote %	Seats	+/–
ARENA	45.03	39	0
FMLN	21.39	21	New
PDC	17.87	18	−8
PCN	6.21	4	−5
CVD	4.45	1	−7
MU	2.49	1	New
This lists parties that won seats. See the complete results below.
Results by constituency

General elections were held in El Salvador on 20 March 1994, with a second round of the presidential elections taking place on 24 April. The president, vice president, 84 members of the National Assembly, and 262 mayors, were all up for election this cycle.

Armando Calderón Sol of the Nationalist Republican Alliance won the presidential elections, whilst his party also won the legislative elections. Voter turnout was 52.27% in the first round of the presidential elections and 45.51% in the second, whilst it was 53.08% for the legislative election.

== Background ==
This marked the first election in El Salvador since the signing of a peace agreement with the government and the Farabundo Martí National Liberation Front, a former guerrilla group that morphed into a political party after the agreement was signed. A new electoral register was created after the signing of the peace agreement, in which roughly 780,000 individuals signed up to vote, which required the submission of a birth certificate or a duplicate for eligibility purposes. Of those individuals, around 74,000 of them did not receive voter registration cards. UN election observers reported that there were multiple cases of authorities withholding cameras to take pictures for registration cards in areas that generally supported the Farabundo Marti National Liberation Front. They also noted instances of mayors charging fees to duplicate lost birth certificates.

Alfredo Cristiani, who had served as president under the Nationalist Republican Alliance party, was ineligible for re-election, so Calderón Sol, the erstwhile mayor of San Salvador, became the nominee for the party. During this election, Calderón Sol was complimentary of former party leader Roberto D'Aubuisson, who founded the Nationalist Republican Alliance on anti-communist principles, while also seeking it expand its appeal by rebranding as a more mainstream conservative party. Explaining his approach, Calderón Sol said that "we are faithful to our past in the defense of free enterprise, a market economy, private property and individual liberties. But we use a different rhetoric, softer, more profound, easier for other groups to understand."

The International Foundation for Electoral Systems (IFES) conducted oversight on both the 20 March 1994 general election and later the 24 April 1994 presidential run-off election, which was triggered after no candidate exceeded the 50% threshold. The IFES wrote in their report that the voting process was completed in an "orderly, peaceful and transparent fashion which permitted the popular will of the Salvadoran people to be expressed", while also recognizing deficiencies in the "logistical organization of the elections along with problems with the electoral registry." They believed that there was an insufficient number of voting centers, resulting in difficulties in voters finding their names on the registry. The IFES also found shortcomings in voting center accessibility, which they attributed to inadequate public transportation and large distances between certain citizens and their polling places. 16,000 voting center officials received training for the election, of which 5,000 of them worked during election day.

== Results ==
=== President ===
Candidate	Running mate	Party	First round		Second round	
Candidate	Running mate	Party	Votes	%	Votes	%
Armando Calderón Sol	Enrique Borgo Bustamante	Nationalist Republican Alliance	651,632	49.11	818,264	68.35
Rubén Zamora	Francisco Roberto Lima Rivera	FMLN–CD	331,629	24.99	378,980	31.65
Fidel Chávez Mena	Atilio Vieytez	Christian Democratic Party	215,936	16.27		
Roberto García Escobar	Roberto Marchesini	National Conciliation Party	70,854	5.34		
Jorge Martínez	Arístides Escobar Benítez	Movement of Unity	31,925	2.41		
Edgardo Engelhard	José Roberto Rivas Iglesias	Movement of National Solidarity	13,959	1.05		
Rina Victoria Escalante	Edgar Saúl Romero Sánchez	Authentic Democratic Christian Movement	10,901	0.82		
Total			1,326,836	100.00	1,197,244	100.00
Valid votes			1,326,836	92.72	1,197,244	96.08
Invalid/blank votes			104,199	7.28	48,783	3.92
Total votes			1,431,035	100.00	1,246,027	100.00
Registered voters/turnout			2,737,743	52.27	2,737,743	45.51
Source: TSE, TSE

=== Legislative Assembly ===
Party	Votes	%	Seats	+/–
Nationalist Republican Alliance	605,775	45.03	39	0
Farabundo Martí National Liberation Front	287,811	21.39	21	New
Christian Democratic Party	240,451	17.87	18	–8
National Conciliation Party	83,520	6.21	4	–5
Democratic Convergence	59,843	4.45	1	–7
Movement of Unity	33,510	2.49	1	New
Movement of National Solidarity	12,827	0.95	0	New
Authentic Democratic Christian Movement	12,109	0.90	0	–1
National Revolutionary Movement	9,431	0.70	0	New
Total	1,345,277	100.00	84	0
Valid votes	1,345,277	92.57		
Invalid/blank votes	108,022	7.43		
Total votes	1,453,299	100.00		
Registered voters/turnout	2,737,743	53.08		
Source: Nohlen, TSE

=== Municipalities ===
Party	Votes	%	Seats	+/–
Nationalist Republican Alliance			207	–
Christian Democratic Party			29	–
Farabundo Martí National Liberation Front			13	New
National Conciliation Party			10	–
Farabundo Martí National Liberation Front–Democratic Convergence			2	–
Authentic Democratic Christian Movement			1	–
Movement of Unity			0	New
Movement of National Solidarity			0	New
National Revolutionary Movement			0	New
Total			262	0
Registered voters/turnout	2,737,743	–		
Source: Supreme Electoral Court

=== PARLACEN ===
Party	Votes	%	Seats	+/–
Nationalist Republican Alliance	605,775	45.03	9	New
Farabundo Martí National Liberation Front	287,811	21.39	4	New
Christian Democratic Party	240,451	17.87	4	New
National Conciliation Party	83,520	6.21	1	New
Democratic Convergence	59,843	4.45	1	New
Movement of Unity	33,510	2.49	1	New
Movement of National Solidarity	12,827	0.95	0	New
Authentic Democratic Christian Movement	12,109	0.90	0	New
National Revolutionary Movement	9,431	0.70	0	New
Total	1,345,277	100.00	20	0
Registered voters/turnout	2,737,743	–		
Source: Supreme Electoral Court
