= Government of El Salvador =

Executive, legislative, and judicial branches of El Salvador

- Unitary presidential republic
- Coat of arms of El Salvador
- Country: El Salvador
- Established: February 18, 1841

Government
  - President: Nayib Bukele
  - Vice President: Félix Ulloa
- Website: www.presidencia.gob.sv

The Government of El Salvador is a unitary presidential representative democratic republic. The powers of the government are divided into three independent branches: the Executive, the Legislative, and the Judicial. The authority of the state is grounded in the Constitution of El Salvador, adopted in 1983 and significantly amended in 2024 and 2025 to restructure the legislative and executive cycles.

== Executive Branch ==
The Executive branch is led by the President of El Salvador, who acts as both head of state and head of government. Following constitutional reforms passed on July 31, 2025, the presidential term was extended from five to six years.

The reforms also rescheduled the next general election for February 28, 2027, to synchronize the presidential, legislative, and municipal election cycles. This change effectively moves the end of the current term to June 1, 2027.

=== Cabinet of Ministers ===
The Cabinet consists of 16 ministries appointed by the President. It is responsible for executing national policy and managing the state's day-to-day operations.

Current Cabinet of El Salvador (2024–2027)
| Office | Officeholder | Term Start |
|---|---|---|
| Vice President of El Salvador | Félix Ulloa | June 1, 2019 |
| Minister of Foreign Affairs | Alexandra Hill Tinoco | June 1, 2019 |
| Minister of Justice and Public Security | Gustavo Villatoro | March 26, 2021 |
| Minister of Finance | Jerson Posada | July 18, 2023 |
| Minister of the Economy | María Luisa Hayem | June 1, 2019 |
| Minister of National Defense | René Merino Monroy | June 1, 2019 |
| Minister of Education, Science and Technology | Karla Edith Trigueros | August 14, 2025 |
| Minister of Health | Francisco Alabí | March 27, 2020 |
| Minister of Public Works and Transportation | Edgar Romeo Rodríguez Herrera | June 1, 2019 |
| Minister of Agriculture and Livestock | Óscar Enrique Guardado | December 14, 2022 |
| Minister of Labor and Social Provision | Rolando Castro | June 1, 2019 |
| Minister of the Environment and Natural Resources | Fernando López Larreynaga | June 1, 2019 |
| Minister of Tourism | Morena Ileana Valdez Vigil | June 1, 2019 |
| Minister of Culture | Raúl Neftalí Castillo | June 19, 2024 |
| Minister of Housing | Michelle Sol | June 1, 2019 |
| Minister of Internal Affairs (Gobernación) | Juan Carlos Bidegain | November 20, 2020 |
| Minister of Local Development | María Ofelia Navarrete | June 1, 2019 |

== Legislative Branch ==
The Legislative Assembly of El Salvador is a unicameral legislature. In June 2023, the number of deputies was reduced from 84 to 60. Deputies serve three-year terms and are responsible for the creation of national law and the ratification of international treaties.

== Judicial Branch ==
The judicial branch is headed by the Supreme Court of Justice. The court consists of 15 magistrates divided into four specialized chambers. Magistrates are elected by the Legislative Assembly for nine-year terms.

== See also ==
- Constitution of El Salvador
- Politics of El Salvador
- Elections in El Salvador
- List of political parties in El Salvador
