= Enrique Borgo Bustamante =

Salvadoran politician (1928–2025)

Vice President of El Salvador
- In office 1 June 1994 – 1 June 1999
- President: Armando Calderón Sol
- Preceded by: José Francisco Merino López
- Succeeded by: Carlos Quintanilla Schmidt

Personal details
- Born: 22 August 1928 San Salvador, El Salvador
- Died: 20 August 2025 (aged 96) San Salvador, El Salvador
- Party: Nationalist Republican Alliance
- Education: Lawyer
- Alma mater: University of El Salvador

Enrique Borgo Bustamante (22 August 1928 – 20 August 2025) was a Salvadoran politician who served as Vice President of El Salvador from 1994 to 1999.

== Biography ==
Borgo was born on 22 August 1928 in San Salvador. He graduated as a lawyer from the University of El Salvador in 1952, and did a postgraduate degree in public finances, commercial and civil law at the University of Rome, as well as a degree in economic sciences at the University of El Salvador in 1967. Borgo was a businessman and the onetime executive president of TACA International Airlines.

Borgo's political life started in 1960 as a private secretary of a government junta. Later he was elected by Legislative Assembly of El Salvador. Borgo became the first designated person or first in the line of succession to the presidency (primer designado a la presidencia) between July 1977 and October 1979 for president general Carlos Humberto Romero. In 1990 President Alfredo Cristiani appointed him as an advisor to the El Salvador's UN mission in New York.

Borgo was elected as Vice President of El Salvador in the 1994 elections, and served in the presidency of Armando Calderón Sol until 1999. He was also minister in the presidency. He was El Salvador's ambassador to Spain from 2004 to 2009.

Borgo Bustamante died on 20 August 2025, two days before his 97th birthday.
