= José Francisco Merino =

Salvadoran politician

José Francisco Merino López

Vice President of El Salvador
- In office 1 June 1989 – 1 June 1994
- President: Alfredo Cristiani
- Preceded by: Rodolfo Antonio Castillo Claramount
- Succeeded by: Enrique Borgo Bustamante

Deputy of the Legislative Assembly of El Salvador from Santa Ana
- In office 1 May 2000 – 1 May 2021

Personal details
- Born: 29 February 1952 (age 74) San Miguel, El Salvador
- Party: Nationalist Republican Alliance (1981–1996); National Coalition Party (since 1996)

José Francisco Merino López (born 29 February 1952) is a politician from El Salvador and former Vice President of El Salvador from 1989 to 1994.

Merino was born on 29 February 1952, in San Miguel. He studied in the University of El Salvador.

Merino was reported to have been a confidant of right-wing death squad leader Roberto d'Aubuisson. He was a member of the constituent assembly from 1982 to 1984.

Merino was elected as Vice President of El Salvador in the 1989 elections, and served in the presidency of Alfredo Cristiani until 1994. He was additionally Minister of Interior from 1989 to 1990. He was a elected as a member of Central American Parliament from 1994 to 1999. In 1996 he left Nationalist Republican Alliance and joined National Conciliation Party. He was president of the Court of Accounts from 1998 to 1999.

Merino has been elected to Legislative Assembly of El Salvador consequently from 2000 to 2021.
