= Milena Calderón Sol de Escalón =

Salvadoran politician

Milena Calderón Sol de Escalón, is a Salvadoran politician, first female mayoress of Santa Ana since 1 May 2018. She was member of the Legislative Assembly of El Salvador between 1991 and 2018 for the Nationalist Republican Alliance (ARENA). She is sister of former President, Armando Calderón Sol.
