= El Salvador national football team results =

This article details the international fixtures and results of the El Salvador national football team.

== Results by years ==
=== 2000s ===
22 January 2009 first round	El Salvador	1–1	Nicaragua	Tegucigalpa, Honduras
17:00 (UTC−06)	Avilés 18' (o.g.)	Report	Medina 85'	Stadium: Estadio Tiburcio Carías Andino; Attendance: 20,000; Referee: Carlos Batres (GUA)

24 January 2009 first round	Belize	1–4	El Salvador	Tegucigalpa, Honduras
15:00 (UTC−06)	James 73'	Report	Pacheco 11' (pen.), 30' (pen.); Sánchez 75'; Ayala 88'	Stadium: Estadio Tiburcio Carías Andino; Attendance: 900; Referee: Wálter Quesada (CRC)

26 January 2009 first round	Honduras	2–0	El Salvador	Tegucigalpa, Honduras
19:30 (UTC−06)	Pavón 34' (pen.); Chávez 72'	Report		Stadium: Estadio Tiburcio Carías Andino; Attendance: 20,000; Referee: Wálter Quesada (CRC)

30 January 2009 Semifinals	Costa Rica	3–0	El Salvador	Tegucigalpa, Honduras
17:00 (UTC−06)	Furtado 18'	Awarded; Report		Stadium: Estadio Tiburcio Carías Andino; Attendance: 2,500; Referee: Roberto Moreno (PAN)
Note: The game was called after sixty minutes of play when El Salvador was reduced to six players. Two El Salvador players, Alexander Escobar and Eliseo Quintanilla, were awarded red cards in the first half, and Deris Umanzor, Rodolfo Zelaya, and goalkeeper Juan José Gómez were injured and had to leave the game after El Salvador had already exhausted their three substitutions. The game was awarded 3–0 to Costa Rica

1 February 2009 Third place play-off	Honduras	1–0	El Salvador	Tegucigalpa, Honduras
15:30 (UTC−06)	Espinoza 30'	Report		Stadium: Estadio Tiburcio Carías Andino; Attendance: 900; Referee: Wálter Quesada (CRC)

6 February 2009	El Salvador	1–0	Peru	Los Angeles, United States
	Romero 24'			Stadium: Los Angeles Memorial Coliseum

11 February 2009 Fourth round	El Salvador	2–2	Trinidad and Tobago	San Salvador, El Salvador
19:00 UTC-6	Romero 82', 90+3'	Report	Edwards 7'; Yorke 26' (pen.)	Stadium: Estadio Cuscatlán; Attendance: 25,000; Referee: Marco Antonio Rodríguez (Mexico)

28 March 2009 Fourth round	El Salvador	2–2	United States	San Salvador, El Salvador
19:00 UTC-6	Quintanilla 15'; Castillo 72'	Report	Altidore 77'; Hejduk 88'	Stadium: Estadio Cuscatlán; Attendance: 30,350; Referee: Benito Archundia (Mexico)

1 April 2009 Fourth round	Costa Rica	1–0	El Salvador	San José, Costa Rica
20:00 UTC-6	Centeno 69'	Report		Stadium: Estadio Ricardo Saprissa Aymá; Attendance: 19,200; Referee: Jair Marrufo (United States)

27 May 2009	Ecuador	1–3	El Salvador	Los Angeles, United States
20:00 UTC-7	Montero 7'		Romero 10', 51'; Corrales 45'	Stadium: Los Angeles Memorial Coliseum; Attendance: 28,793

30 May 2009	Jamaica	0–0	El Salvador	Los Angeles, United States
				Stadium: Los Angeles Memorial Coliseum; Attendance: 30,000

6 June 2009 Fourth round	El Salvador	2–1	Mexico	San Salvador, El Salvador
19:00 UTC-6	Martínez 11'; Quintanilla 86' (pen.)	Report	Blanco 71' (pen.)	Stadium: Estadio Cuscatlán; Attendance: 33,000; Referee: Wálter Quesada (Costa Rica)

10 June 2009 Fourth round	Honduras	1–0	El Salvador	San Pedro Sula, Honduras
19:30 UTC-6	Pavón 13'	Report		Stadium: Estadio Olímpico Metropolitano; Attendance: 28,000; Referee: Baldomero Toledo (United States)

3 July 2009 Group stage	Costa Rica	1–2	El Salvador	Carson, California, United States
19:00 UTC-7	Granados 64'	Report	Romero 19', 87'	Stadium: The Home Depot Center; Attendance: 27,000; Referee: Benito Archundia (Mexico)

7 July 2009 Group stage	El Salvador	0–1	Canada	Columbus, Ohio, United States
21:00 UTC-4		Report	Gerba 32'	Stadium: Columbus Crew Stadium; Attendance: 7,059; Referee: Roberto García (Mexico)

10 July 2009 Group stage	El Salvador	0–1	Jamaica	Miami, United States
21:00 UTC-4		Report	Cummings 70'	Stadium: FIU Stadium; Attendance: 17,269; Referee: Geoffrey Hospedales (Trinidad and Tobago)

7 August 2009	Colombia	2–1	El Salvador	Houston, United States
	Gutiérrez 12'; Mendoza 88'		Moscoso 64'	Stadium: Robertson Stadium; Attendance: 20,418

12 August 2009 Fourth round	Trinidad and Tobago	1–0	El Salvador	Port of Spain, Trinidad and Tobago
19:30 UTC-4	Glen 7'	Report		Stadium: Hasely Crawford Stadium; Attendance: 25,784; Referee: Terry Vaughn (United States)

5 September 2009 Fourth round	United States	2–1	El Salvador	Sandy, Utah, United States
18:00 UTC-6	Dempsey 41'; Altidore 45+2'	Report	Castillo 31'	Stadium: Rio Tinto Stadium; Attendance: 19,066; Referee: José Pineda (Honduras)

9 September 2009 Fourth round	El Salvador	1–0	Costa Rica	San Salvador, El Salvador
19:00 UTC-6	Corrales 90+1'	Report		Stadium: Estadio Cuscatlán; Attendance: 18,000; Referee: Benito Archundia (Mexico)

10 October 2009 Fourth round	Mexico	4–1	El Salvador	Mexico City, Mexico
17:00 UTC-5	González 25' (o.g.); Blanco 71'; Palencia 85'; Vela 90'	Report	Martínez 89'	Stadium: Estadio Azteca; Attendance: 104,000; Referee: Carlos Batres (Guatemala)

14 October 2009 Fourth round	El Salvador	0–1	Honduras	San Salvador, El Salvador
18:05 UTC-6		Report	Pavón 64'	Stadium: Estadio Cuscatlán; Attendance: 28,000; Referee: Ricardo Salazar (United States)

=== 2010s ===
24 February 2010	United States	2–1	El Salvador	Tampa, United States
	Ching 74'; Kljestan 90'		Corrales 59'	Stadium: Raymond James Stadium; Attendance: 21,737; Referee: Silviu Petrescu (Canada)

3 March 2010	El Salvador	1–2	Guatemala	Los Angeles, United States
	Quintanilla 89'		Pappa 45'; Jonny Brown 84'	Stadium: Los Angeles Memorial Coliseum; Attendance: 10,000; Referee: Ricardo Salazar (United States)

19 June 2010 Unofficial friendly	D.C. United (United States)	1–0	El Salvador	Washington, D.C., United States
	Cristman 51'			Stadium: RFK Stadium, Washington, D.C.

4 September 2010 Copa Independencia	Honduras	2–2 (4–3 p)	El Salvador	Los Angeles, United States
20:00 DST	Ó. García 58'; Rojas 88'	Report	Zelaya 41', 90' (pen.)	Stadium: Los Angeles Memorial Coliseum; Attendance: 15,000; Referee: Sorin Stoica (United States)
	Penalties
	Mendoza (penalty scored); J. García (penalty scored); Ó. García (penalty missed); Rojas (penalty scored); Claros (penalty scored)		Zelaya (penalty missed); Castillo (penalty scored); Alas (penalty scored); Martin (penalty scored); Corrales (penalty missed)

7 September 2010	Guatemala	2–0	El Salvador	Washington, D.C., United States
	Thompson 45'; Montepeque 81'			Stadium: RFK Stadium, Washington, D.C. Attendance: 12,246; Referee: Jair Marrufo (United States)

8 October 2010	Panama	1–0	El Salvador	Panama City, Panama
	Pérez 61'			Stadium: Estadio Rommel Fernández; Attendance: 15,000; Referee: Óscar Ruiz (Colombia)

12 October 2010	Costa Rica	2–1	El Salvador	Ciudad Quesada, Costa Rica
	Sánchez 10'; Martínez 88'		Burgos 53'	Stadium: Estadio Carlos Ugalde Álvarez; Attendance: 4,000

14 January 2011 Group stage	El Salvador	2–0	Nicaragua	Panama City, Panama
17:00 (UTC−05:00)	Álvarez (yellow card) 42'; Turcios (yellow card) 57'; Sánchez (yellow card) 63'; Alas 70'; García (yellow card) 75'; Burgos 75'	Report	(yellow card) 4' Eugarrios; (yellow card) 16' Zeledón; (yellow card) 48' Solórzano; (yellow card) 90' Espinoza	Stadium: Estadio Rommel Fernández; Attendance: 2,000; Referee: Wálter Quesada (Costa Rica)

January 16, 2011 Group stage	Belize	2–5	El Salvador	Panama City, Panama
15:00	Smith 45+1' (pen.); Jiménez 76'	Report	Romero 15'; Burgos 24', 46'; Alas 54'; Umanzor 59'	Stadium: Estadio Rommel Fernández; Attendance: 1,500; Referee: Ricardo Cerdas (Costa Rica)

18 January 2011 Group Stage	Panama	2–0	El Salvador	Panama City, Panama
21:00 (UTC−05:00)	Aguilar 25', (yellow card) 27'; Cooper 79'	Report	García (yellow card) 16'	Stadium: Estadio Rommel Fernández; Attendance: 10,000; Referee: Roberto García (Mexico)

January 21, 2011 Semifinals	Honduras	2–0	El Salvador	Panama City, Panama
21:00 (UTC−05:00)	Mejía (yellow card) 20'; Ramírez (yellow card) 29'; Leverón 77'; Chávez (yellow card) 52', (goal) 90+3'	Report	(yellow card) 24' Turcios; (yellow card) 29' Anaya; (yellow card) 87' Baires	Stadium: Estadio Rommel Fernández; Attendance: 5,000; Referee: Wálter Quesada (Costa Rica)

January 23, 2011 Third place match	Panama	0–0 (5–4 p)	El Salvador	Panama City, Panama
15:30 (UTC−05:00)	Rentería (yellow card) 89'; Henríquez (yellow card) 90'	Report	(yellow card) 15' Romero; (yellow card) 54' González; (yellow card) 90' García; (yellow card) 90' Blanco	Stadium: Estadio Rommel Fernández; Attendance: 2,000; Referee: Benigno Pineda (Honduras)
	Penalties
	Brown (penalty scored); Torres (penalty scored); Bonaga (penalty scored); Davis (penalty scored); Henríquez (penalty scored)		(penalty missed) Álvarez; (penalty scored) Alas; (penalty scored) Blanco; (penalty scored) Portillo; (penalty scored) Alas

9 February 2011 Friendly	El Salvador	1–0	Haiti	San Salvador, El Salvador
18:00 (UTC−05:00)	Burgos 15'; Álvarez (yellow card) 42'	Report	(yellow card) 35' Lafrance; (yellow card) 55' (yellow-red card) Joseph	Stadium: Estadio Cuscatlán; Attendance: 18,000; Referee: David España (Guatemala)

24 March 2011 Friendly	Cuba	0–1	El Salvador	Havana, Cuba
14:00 (UTC−06:00)	Colomé (yellow card) 20'; Mesa (yellow card) 31'; Castellanos (yellow card) 36'	Report	(yellow card) 29' Messias; 73' Alas; (yellow card) 85' Alas	Stadium: Estadio Pedro Marrero; Attendance: 4,000; Referee: José Rodríguez (Panama)

29 March 2011 Friendly	El Salvador	2–3	Jamaica	San Salvador, El Salvador
18:15 (UTC−05:00)	Turcios (yellow card) 31'; Alas 41'; Sánchez (yellow card) 43'; Umanzor (yellow card) 54'; Blanco 90+1'	Report	Richards 24', 26'; (yellow card) 39' Vernan; (yellow card) 45' Austin; (yellow card) 52' (yellow-red card) 63' Williams; Cummings 53'; (yellow card) 71' Kerr	Stadium: Estadio Cuscatlán; Attendance: 19,394; Referee: Elmer Rodas (Guatemala)

29 May 2011 Friendly	Honduras	2–2	El Salvador	Houston, United States
19:00 (UTC−05:00)	Leverón (yellow card) 8'; Costly 45'; Bengtson 50' (pen.)	Report	(yellow card) 2' Anaya; 73' Zelaya; 76' Corrales	Stadium: Robertson Stadium; Attendance: 25,380; Referee: Armando Villarreal (United States)

June 5, 2011 Group Stage	Mexico	5–0	El Salvador	Arlington, Texas, United States
20:00 (19:00 UTC−5)	Rodríguez (yellow card) 26'; Juárez 55'; De Nigris 58'; Hernández 60', 67', 90+3' (pen.), (yellow card) 28'	Report	Alas (yellow card) 63'; González (red card) 90+3'	Stadium: Cowboys Stadium; Attendance: 80,108; Referee: Enrico Wijngaarde (Suriname)

June 9, 2011 Group Stage	Costa Rica	1–1	El Salvador	Charlotte, North Carolina, United States
19:00 (18:00 UTC−5)	Brenes 90+5'; Salvatierra (yellow card) 37'; Borges (yellow card) 56'; Acosta (yellow card) 63'	Report	Zelaya 45'; Baires (yellow card) 10'; Montes (yellow card) 53'; Zelaya (yellow card) 75'; Turcios (yellow card) 77'; Anaya (yellow card) 90'	Stadium: Bank of America Stadium; Attendance: 46,012; Referee: Jair Marrufo (United States)

June 12, 2011 Group Stage	El Salvador	6–1	Cuba	Chicago, United States
18:00 (17:00 UTC−5)	Zelaya 13', 71'; Romero 29'; Blanco 69'; Álvarez 84'; Quintanilla 90+4'; García (yellow card) 82'	Report	Márquez 83'; Fernández (yellow card) 32'; Urgelles (yellow card) 45'	Stadium: Soldier Field; Attendance: 62,000; Referee: Neal Brizan (Trinidad and Tobago)

June 19, 2011 Quarterfinals	Panama	1–1 (a.e.t.) (5–3 p)	El Salvador	Washington, D.C., United States
18:00 (18:00 UTC−4)	Tejada 90'	Report	Zelaya 78' (pen.)	Stadium: RFK Stadium; Attendance: 45,424; Referee: Wálter Quesada (Costa Rica)
	Penalties
	Barahona (penalty scored); Rentería (penalty scored); Godoy (penalty scored); Amílcar (penalty scored); Tejada (penalty scored)		(penalty missed) Alas; (penalty scored) Romero; (penalty scored) Zelaya; (penalty scored) Flores

7 August 2011 Friendly	El Salvador	2–1	Venezuela	Washington, D.C., United States
13:30	Sosa 83'; Sánchez 89'; Anaya (yellow card) 5' (red card) 90'	Report	Aristeguieta 29'	Stadium: RFK Stadium; Attendance: 27,765

2 September 2011	El Salvador	3–2	Dominican Republic	Estadio Cuscatlán, San Salvador
19:30 UTC−6	Zelaya 54', 77' (pen.); Bautista 63'	Report	Cruz 66'; Peralta 89'	Attendance: 25,272; Referee: José Rodríguez (Panama)

6 September 2011	Cayman Islands	1–4	El Salvador	Truman Bodden Stadium, George Town
19:30 UTC−5	Ebanks 73' (pen.)	Report	Bautista 49'; Anaya 62', 80'; García 90+3'	Attendance: 2,200; Referee: Elmar Rodas (Guatemala)

7 October 2011	Dominican Republic	1–2	El Salvador	Estadio Panamericano, San Cristóbal
15:05 UTC−4	Ozuna 54'	Report	Romero 37' (pen.); Blanco 67'	Attendance: 2,323; Referee: Ricardo Cerdas (Costa Rica)

11 October 2011	El Salvador	4–0	Cayman Islands	Estadio Cuscatlán, San Salvador
19:30 UTC−6	Turcios 6'; Purdy 13'; Alas 45'; Sosa 88' (pen.)	Report		Attendance: 17,570; Referee: Hugo Cruz (Costa Rica)

11 November 2011	Suriname	1–3	El Salvador	André Kamperveen Stadion, Paramaribo
20:03 UTC−3	Esperance 81'	Report	Blanco 21', 58'; Sánchez 78'	Attendance: 500; Referee: Marcos Brea (Cuba)

15 November 2011	El Salvador	4–0	Suriname	Estadio Cuscatlán, San Salvador
19:30 UTC−6	Romero 33', 62'; Burgos 76', 83'	Report		Attendance: 9,659; Referee: Javier Santos (Puerto Rico)

February 29, 2012 Friendly	El Salvador	0–2	Estonia	Los Angeles, United States
20:00 UTC−08		Report	Klavan 71'; Piiroja 85'	Stadium: Los Angeles Memorial Coliseum; Attendance: 16,000; Referee: Ricardo Salazar (United States)

May 23, 2012 Friendly	El Salvador	2–2	New Zealand	Houston, United States
20:00 CDT	Burgos 13'; Boxall 56' (o.g.)	Report	Hogg 28'; Barbarouses 64'; Sigmund (yellow card) 19'	Stadium: BBVA Compass Stadium; Attendance: 15,000; Referee: Terry Vaughn (United States)

May 26, 2012 Friendly	El Salvador	2–0	Moldova	Dallas, United States
17:30 CDT	Bonilla 16'; J. Alas 24'; Sánchez (yellow card) 38'; D. Alas (yellow card) 66'	Report		Stadium: Cotton Bowl; Referee: Paul Ward (Canada)

June 2, 2012 Friendly	El Salvador	0–3	Honduras	Washington, D.C., United States
16:30 UTC−5	Turcios (yellow card); Purdy (yellow card); Pacheco (yellow card)	Report	Bernárdez 11'; Costly 49'; Lalín 85'; W. Palacios (yellow card); Beckeles (red card) 83'	Stadium: RFK Stadium; Attendance: 41,780; Referee: Ricardo Salazar (USA)

June 8, 2012 WCQ third round	Costa Rica	2–2	El Salvador	San José, Costa Rica
20:00 UTC−6	Saborío 10', (yellow card) 28'; Campbell 15'; Barrantes (yellow card) 45+31'; Salvatierra (yellow card) 56'; Umaña (yellow card) 70'; Rojas (yellow card) 70'	Report	Gutiérrez 23'; Romero 53'; Pacheco (yellow card) 28'; García (yellow card) 46'; Alas (yellow card) 63'; Villalobos (yellow card) 69'; Turcios (yellow card) 83'	Stadium: Estadio Nacional de Costa Rica; Attendance: 23,701; Referee: Walter López (Guatemala)

June 12, 2012 WCQ third round	El Salvador	1–2	Mexico	San Salvador, El Salvador
19:33 UTC−6	Pacheco 64'; García (yellow card) 66'; Sánchez (yellow card) 79'	Report	Zavala 60'; Moreno 82'; Rodríguez (yellow card) 69'	Stadium: Estadio Cuscatlán; Attendance: 29,712; Referee: José Pineda (Honduras)

July 27, 2012 Unofficial Friendly	El Salvador	1–2	(Italy) Roma	New York City, United States
18:00 UTC−6	Gutiérrez 49'	Report	Osvaldo 2'; Bojan 62'; Lamela (yellow card) 38'; Tachtsidis (red card)	Stadium: Red Bull Arena; Referee: Terry Vaughn (United States)

August 11, 2012 Friendly	El Salvador	1–0	Guatemala	Los Angeles, United States
20:30 UTC−6	Bonilla 28'	Report	Contreras (yellow card) 57'; Erwin Morales (yellow card) 60'; Ruiz (yellow card) 71'	Stadium: Home Depot Center; Referee: Terry Vaughn (United States)

August 15, 2012 Friendly	El Salvador	0–2	Jamaica	Washington, D.C., United States
19:30 UTC−5	D. Alas (yellow card) 58'	Report	Shelton 16', 65'; Watson (yellow card) 42'; Mattocks (yellow card) 55'; Johnson (yellow card) 59'	Stadium: RFK Stadium; Referee: David Gantar (Canada)

September 7, 2012 WCQ third round	El Salvador	2–2	Guyana	San Salvador, El Salvador
19:30 UTC−6	Gutiérrez 3'; Romero 28'	Report	Bobb 16', 53'; Moore (yellow card) 69'; Reynolds (yellow card) 75'	Stadium: Estadio Cuscatlán; Attendance: 24,000; Referee: Jair Marrufo (United States)

September 11, 2012 WCQ third round	Guyana	2–3	El Salvador	Providence, Guyana
20:00 UTC−4	Richardson 1'; Nurse 62'	Report	Romero 13'; Alas 51'; Burgos 77'; Cerén (yellow card) 61'; Quintanilla (yellow card) 74'; García (yellow card) 90+1'	Stadium: Providence Stadium; Attendance: 4,141; Referee: Raymond Bogle (Jamaica)

October 12, 2012 WCQ third round	El Salvador	0–1	Costa Rica	San Salvador, El Salvador
19:30 UTC−6	Henríquez (yellow card) 37'; Gutiérrez (yellow card) 68'; Quintanilla (red card) 87'; Pacheco (red card) 90+2'	Report	Cubero 31'; Oviedo (yellow card) 39'; Acosta (yellow card) 47'; Umaña (yellow card) 74'	Stadium: Estadio Cuscatlán; Attendance: 35,082; Referee: Mark Geiger (United States)

October 16, 2012 WCQ third round	Mexico	2–0	El Salvador	Torreón, Mexico
20:00 UTC−5	Peralta 64'; Hernández 85'	Report		Stadium: Estadio Corona; Attendance: 26,333; Referee: Jafeth Perea (Panama)

18 January 2013 Group Stage	Honduras	1–1	El Salvador	San José, Costa Rica
18:00 UTC−06	Bengtson 75'; García (yellow card) 43'; Peralta (yellow card) 80'	Report	Burgos 77'; Blanco (yellow card) 90+2'; Castillo (yellow card) 90+3'	Stadium: Estadio Nacional; Attendance: 2,500; Referee: Walter López (Guatemala)

20 January 2013 Group Stage	El Salvador	0–0	Panama	San José, Costa Rica
16:00 UTC−06	Burgos (yellow card) 72'; Henríquez (yellow card) 86'; Cerén (yellow card) 90+2'	Report	Torres (yellow card) 27'; Rodríguez (yellow card) 63'	Stadium: Estadio Nacional; Attendance: 250; Referee: Wálter Quesada (Costa Rica)

25 January 2013 Semifinals	Costa Rica	1–0	El Salvador	San José, Costa Rica
20:00 UTC−06	Wallace 72'; González (yellow card) 28'; Rodríguez (yellow card) 40'; Saborío (yellow card) 44'; Meneses (yellow card) 45'	Report	Castillo (yellow card) 26'; Burgos (yellow card) 39'	Stadium: Estadio Nacional; Attendance: 4,993; Referee: Roberto García (Mexico)

27 January 2013 Third place match	El Salvador	1–0	Belize	San José, Costa Rica
14:30 UTC−06	Bonilla 50'; Mayen (yellow card) 29'	Report	Makin (yellow card) 45'	Stadium: Estadio Nacional; Attendance: 1,997; Referee: Sandy Vásquez (Dominican Republic)

6 February 2013 Friendly	Paraguay	3–0	El Salvador	Asunción, Paraguay
20:30 UTC−4	Aguilar 36'; Ortiz 56', 62'	Report		Stadium: Estadio Dr. Nicolás Léoz; Attendance: 4,099; Referee: Ricardo Marques (Brazil)

21 March 2013 Friendly	Ecuador	5–0	El Salvador	Quito, Ecuador
16:30 UTC−5	Caicedo 18', 46'; Benítez 36'; Montero 64'; Rojas 89'; Noboa (yellow card) 31'	Report		Stadium: Estadio Olímpico Atahualpa; Attendance: 10,000; Referee: Miguel Santiváñez (Peru)

22 May 2013 Friendly	Venezuela	2–1	El Salvador	Mérida, Venezuela
	González 56' (pen.); Martínez 68' (pen.)		Cerén 24'	Stadium: Estadio Metropolitano de Mérida; Attendance: 28,133; Referee: Diego Lara (Ecuador)

8 July 2013	El Salvador	2–2	Trinidad and Tobago	Red Bull Arena, Harrison
19:00	Zelaya 22', 69'	Report	Daniel 11'; Jones 73'	Attendance: 20,000; Referee: Marco Rodríguez (Mexico)

12 July 2013	Honduras	1–0	El Salvador	Sun Life Stadium, Miami Gardens
21:30	Claros 90+2'	Report		Attendance: 28,713; Referee: Jair Marrufo (United States)

15 July 2013	El Salvador	1–0	Haiti	BBVA Compass Stadium, Houston
19:00	Zelaya 76'	Report		Attendance: 21,783; Referee: Javier Santos (Puerto Rico)

21 July 2013	United States	5–1	El Salvador	M&T Bank Stadium, Baltimore
16:00	Goodson 21'; Corona 29'; Johnson 60'; Donovan 78'; Diskerud 83'	Report	Zelaya 39' (pen.)	Attendance: 70,540; Referee: Enrico Wijngaarde (Suriname)
