= .sv =

Internet country code top-level domain for El Salvador

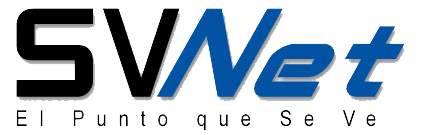
- Introduced: 4 November 1994
- TLD type: Country code top-level domain
- Status: Active
- Registry: SVNet
- Sponsor: SVNet
- Intended use: Entities connected with El Salvador
- Actual use: Popular in El Salvador, but also used as an abbreviation for Silicon Valley
- Registered domains: 9,341 (1 May 2023)
- Registration restrictions: Must have local contact
- Structure: Registrations are taken directly at the second level or at third level beneath various 2nd-level labels
- Documents: Policies
- Dispute policies: UDRP
- Registry website: SVNet

.sv is the Internet country code top-level domain (ccTLD) for El Salvador.

== Second-level domains ==
- edu.sv: Education and/or research institutions
- gob.sv: National governmental institutions
- com.sv: Commercial entities and other not included in the rest
- org.sv: Non-profit Organizations
- red.sv: National network administration (reserved)
- ts.sv: Trade Shift (reserved)

== See also ==
- Internet in El Salvador
