= International rankings of El Salvador =

These are the international rankings of El Salvador

== Economy ==
- The World Economic Forum's Global Competitiveness Report ranked El Salvador 77 out of 133.
- El Salvador ranks 124th among 189 countries in the Human Development Index.
- El Salvador has the second-highest level of income equality in Latin America.

== Government ==
- Transparency International in its Corruption Perceptions Index ranked El Salvador 84 out of 180 countries.

== Mental health ==
- El Salvador is the 34th happiest country in the world according to the Happy Planet Index.

== Military ==
- In the Global Peace Index El Salvador is ranked 94 out of 144.

== Technology ==
- World Intellectual Property Organization: Global Innovation Index 2026, ranked 100 out of 139 countries
