= Politics of El Salvador =

Politics of the Republic of El Salvador Política de la República de El Salvador
- Coat of arms of El Salvador
- Polity type: Presidential republic
- Constitution: 1983 Constitution of El Salvador
- Formation: 15 September 1821

Legislative branch
- Name: Legislative Assembly
- Type: Unicameral
- Meeting place: San Salvador
- Presiding officer: Ernesto Castro, President of the Legislative Assembly

Executive branch
- Head of state
- Title: President of El Salvador
- Currently: Nayib Bukele
- Appointer: Elected by the citizenry
- Cabinet
- Current cabinet: Cabinet of Nayib Bukele

Judicial branch
- Name: Supreme Court of Justice
- Courts: Constitutional Court; Administrative Disputes Court; Civil Court; Criminal Court
- Chief judge: Óscar Alberto López Jerez

Politics of El Salvador takes place in a framework of a presidential representative democratic republic, whereby the President of El Salvador is both head of state and head of government, and of an executive power is exercised by the government. Legislative power is vested in both the government and the Legislative Assembly. The Judiciary is independent of the executive and the legislature.

El Salvador has a history of political instability, coups and political violence. After the end of the 1979–1992 Salvadoran Civil War, El Salvador had a sustained period of stable albeit fragile democracy. However, under Nayib Bukele's tenure as president, El Salvador has undergone democratic backsliding. El Salvador was ranked 5th least electoral democratic country in Latin America and the Caribbean according to V-Dem Democracy indices in 2023 with a score of 0.378 out of 1.

== Political culture ==
El Salvador has a multi-party system. Three political parties Nuevas Ideas (NI), the Nationalist Republican Alliance (ARENA) and the Farabundo Martí National Liberation Front (FMLN) have tended to dominate elections since the end of the civil war. ARENA candidates won four consecutive presidential elections until the election of Mauricio Funes of the FMLN in March 2009. In 2014, he was followed by another FMLN president, Salvador Sánchez Cerén.

The 2019 election was won by Nayib Bukele as the candidate of the center-right Grand Alliance for National Unity (GANA) party. In February 2021, El Salvador's legislative election was an important breakthrough. The new party, founded by President Bukele, Nuevas Ideas (NI), won around two-thirds of votes with its allies (NI–GANA). His party won a supermajority of 56 seats in the 84-seat legislature. Bukele became the country's most powerful leader in three decades.

On 4 February 2024, President Nayib Bukele, won re-election with 84% of the vote in the presidential election. His party Nuevas Ideas (New Ideas) won 58 of the El Salvador parliament's 60 seats.

Before the Bukele era, the departments of the central region, especially the capital and the coastal regions, known as departamentos rojos, or red departments, were mostly left-wing while the departamentos azules, or blue departments, in the east, western and highland regions were generally conservative.

== Executive branch ==
Main office-holders
Office	Name	Party	Since
President	Nayib Bukele	Nuevas Ideas	1 June 2019

El Salvador elects its head of state, the President of El Salvador, directly through a fixed-date general election whose winner is decided by absolute majority. If an absolute majority is not achieved by any candidate in the first round of a presidential election, then a run-off pool election is conducted 30 days later between the two candidates who obtained the most votes in the first round. The president serves a five-year term. He is barred from immediately succeeding himself, though previously elected presidents may run for a second, non-consecutive term.

In September 2021, El Salvador's Supreme Court decided to allow President Nayib Bukele to run for a second term in the 2024 presidential election, despite the Constitution prohibiting the president from serving two consecutive terms in office. The decision was made by judges appointed to the court by President Bukele. On 1 June 2024, President Nayib Bukele was sworn in for the second five-year term.

== Legislative branch ==
Salvadorans also elect a single-chamber, unicameral national legislature, the Legislative Assembly of El Salvador, of 60 members (deputies) elected by open-list proportional representation for three-year terms, with the possibility of immediate re-election.

== Judicial branch ==
The Judiciary, headed by the Supreme Court, is composed of 15 judges, one of them being elected as President of the Judiciary.

== Foreign relations ==
El Salvador is a member of the United Nations and several of its specialized agencies, the Organization of American States (OAS), the Central American Common Market (CACM), the Central American Parliament (PARLACEN), and the Central American Integration System (SICA). It actively participates in the Central American Security Commission (CASC), which seeks to promote regional arms control.

El Salvador also is a member of the World Trade Organization and is pursuing regional free trade agreements. An active participant in the Summit of the Americas process, El Salvador chairs a working group on market access under the Free Trade Area of the Americas initiative.

== See also ==
- Freedom of speech in El Salvador
- State of Exception in El Salvador
