= Rubén Zamora =

Salvadoran politician (born 1942)

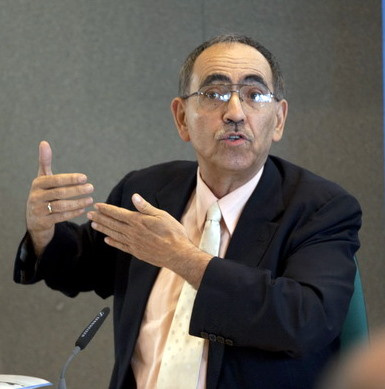
- Zamora speaking at the Interpeace Partners Forum at the U.S. Mission to the U.N. in 2012

Ambassador to the United States
- In office April 16, 2013 – September 18, 2014
- Preceded by: Francisco Roberto Altschul Fuentes
- Succeeded by: Francisco Roberto Altschul Fuentes

Ambassador to the United Nations
- In office August 13, 2014 – June 1, 2019
- Preceded by: Joaquín Alexander Maza Martelli
- Succeeded by: Egriselda López

Personal details
- Born: Rubén Ignacio Zamora Rivas; November 9, 1942 (age 83) San Salvador, El Salvador
- Party: Farabundo Martí National Liberation Front

Rubén Ignacio Zamora Rivas (born November 9, 1942) is a Salvadoran politician.

== Education ==
- until the age of nineteen he studied in a Seminary, got influenced by the theology of liberation, was attracted by ecclesial base communities, where the formation of peasant collectives and self-help communities began.
- He completed a law degree abroad.

== Politician ==
- His efforts for the rural poor soon faced with the repression of the ruling oligarchy of landowners (Argolla de oro) and military.
- In 1960 he joined the Christian Democratic Party (PDC), founded by José Napoleón Duarte.
- Ahead of the presidential elections of 1972, the PDC joined with other opposition groups, the social democratic MNR and the further to the left Unión Democrática Nacionalista (UDN, fundada en 1969), the Unión Nacional Opositora (UNO). Duarte ran for the presidency, MNR leader Guillermo Ungo for the office of vice president.
- He was a member of the cabinet of the Salvadoran government Revolutionary Government Junta of El Salvador following the October 15, 1979 coup, but he resigned in early 1980 to protest the escalation of repression as the horrific civil war was breaking out. His brother, Mario, was serving as Attorney General when he was assassinated by a right wing death squad on February 23, 1980. After resigning from government, Rubén Zamora helped found the Frente Democrático Revolucionario (FDR) in April 1980.

After some time in exile, Rubén Zamora returned to El Salvador in November 1987 and helped to found the Convergencia Democrática (CD), a center-left electoral coalition that, still in the midst of the civil war, competed in the 1989 elections. Its willingness to compete marked an attempt to reestablish a peaceful center-left. In the first presidential election following the civil war in 1994, Zamora was the presidential candidate for the leftist coalition that included the former guerrilla Farabundo Marti National Liberation Front. He finished in second place with 25% of the vote. In subsequent years he has run for office with various incarnations of center-left parties, such as the Centro Democrático Unido (CDU - United Democratic Center). During the 1990s, he served as Vice President of the National Assembly and as a member of the National Peace Commission, and he founded and led the Centro Democrático Unido party. Zamora has taught political science at the University of El Salvador, Universidad Centroamericana, Universidad San Carlos, and Universidad Rafael Landivar (both in Guatemala), Essex University, and Stanford University. He has published many works on Salvadoran politics, including El Salvador, heridas que no cierran: Los partidos políticos en la post-guerra, and La izquierda partidaria salvadoreña: Entre la identidad y el poder.

- On April 12, 2013 he was designated ambassador to Washington, D.C., where he was accredited on April 16, 2013 until he was accredited as Permanent Representative to the Headquarters of the United Nations in New York City on September 18, 2014.

Serving as the Ambassador of El Salvador to The United States, he is known for his humble nature.
