= Telecommunications in El Salvador =

Telecommunications in El Salvador include radio, television, fixed and mobile telephones, and the Internet, centered primarily around the capital, San Salvador.

== Radio and television ==
- Radio stations: Hundreds of commercial radio broadcast stations and 1 government-owned radio broadcast station (2007).
- Radios: 5.75 million (1997).
- Televisions stations: Multiple privately owned national terrestrial TV networks, supplemented by cable TV networks that carry international channels (2007).
- Television sets: 5,900,881 (2005).

The most powerful group in the media sector is Tele-Corporación Salvadoreña (TCS), which controls four television channels with nation-wide coverage (Channels 2, 4, 6 and VTV) as well as two radio stations (Vox FM and Qué Buena). Together with TCS, Canal 12 (whose majority shareholder is TV Azteca), Canal 21 (of the Megavisión group) and Canal 33 (of the Tecnovisión group, owned by the Technological University of El Salvador) complete the national television spectrum.

The law permits the executive branch to use the emergency broadcasting service to take over all broadcast and cable networks temporarily to televise political programming. The president occasionally uses this law to highlight his accomplishments.

== Telephones ==
- Calling code: +503
- International call prefix: 00
- Fixed lines: 1.1 million lines in use, 74th in the world (2012).
- Mobile cellular: 8.7 million lines, 88th in the world (2012); in 2007 the number of mobile phones exceeded the country's population giving the country a 1.06 per capita cellphone penetration rate.
- Teledensity: Mobile cellular exceeds 135 per 100 persons (2011).
- Telephone system: multiple mobile-cellular providers are expanding services rapidly; growth in fixed-line services has slowed in the face of mobile-cellular competition (2011).
- Satellite earth stations: 1 Intelsat (Atlantic Ocean) (2011).
- Connected to the Central American Microwave System (2011), a trunk microwave radio relay system that links the countries of Central America and Mexico with each other.

== Internet ==
- Top-level domain: .sv
- Internet users: 3.8 million users, 59.4% of the population (2019).
- Fixed broadband: 235,403 subscriptions, 81st in the world; 3.9% of the population, 111th in the world (2012).
- Wireless broadband: 335,716, 104th in the world; 5.5% of the population, 104th in the world (2012).
- Internet hosts: 24,070 hosts (2012).
- IPv4: 575,744 addresses allocated, less than 0.05% of the world total, 94.5 addresses per 1000 people (2012).
- Internet service providers: 11 ISPs (early 2005).

=== IT Industry ===
El Salvador's IT Industry's history started early with several IT outsourcing companies such as Gpremper and an early search engine that predated Google in 1995 called "Buscaniguas". The industry has since expanded with companies such as Creativa Consultores, Applaudo Studios, and Elaniin providing software and website design services to clients globally while employing thousands of people. Canadian Telus International, a major global IT outsourcing and software development firm, has a significant workforce in the country employing nearly 1,500 people in high tech and customer service roles. The startup scene has also been growing with firms such as HugoApp employing 600 locals and providing delivery and ride sharing services to nearly 1 million users in the Central American/CAFTA region. In 2020, the government announced its "Digital Agenda 2020" a plan to digitize government services, digitize identities, make it easier to start businesses, attract foreign investment and improve the education system. Finally, the passing of the Bitcoin Law in 2021 made El Salvador the first country in the world to adopt a cryptocurrency (Bitcoin) as legal tender, this move seeks to improve access to financial services to the non-banked and under banked.

== Freedom of Speech restrictions ==
There are no government restrictions on access to the Internet or credible reports that the government monitors e-mail or Internet chat rooms without judicial oversight. Individuals and groups engage in the expression of views via the Internet, including by e-mail. Internet access is available in public places throughout the country.

The constitution provides for freedom of speech and press, and the government generally respects these rights. Individuals criticize the government publicly or privately without reprisal, and in most cases the government does not interfere with such criticism. The constitution prohibits arbitrary interference with privacy, family, home, or correspondence, and the government generally respects these prohibitions.

=== By gangs ===
In March 2012, Carlos Dada, the owner of online newspaper El Faro, received death threats from gang members. The gangs were unhappy with El Faro's reporting on the gang truce. On April 13, the International Press Institute criticized the government for not taking any actions to guarantee the safety of El Faro journalists. According to the Salvadoran Association of Journalists (APES), the media practices self-censorship, especially in their reporting on gangs and narcotics trafficking. APES stated that many members of the media were afraid to report in detail on these subjects due to fear of retaliation from gangs and narcotics trafficking groups.

== See also ==
- Economy of El Salvador
- Politics of El Salvador
