= Coat of arms of El Salvador =

Versions
- Seal of the President
- Armiger: Republic of El Salvador
- Adopted: 15 September 1912
- Motto: Dios, Unión, Libertad "God, Union, Liberty"

The coat of arms of El Salvador has been in use in its current form since 15 September 1912.

== Features ==
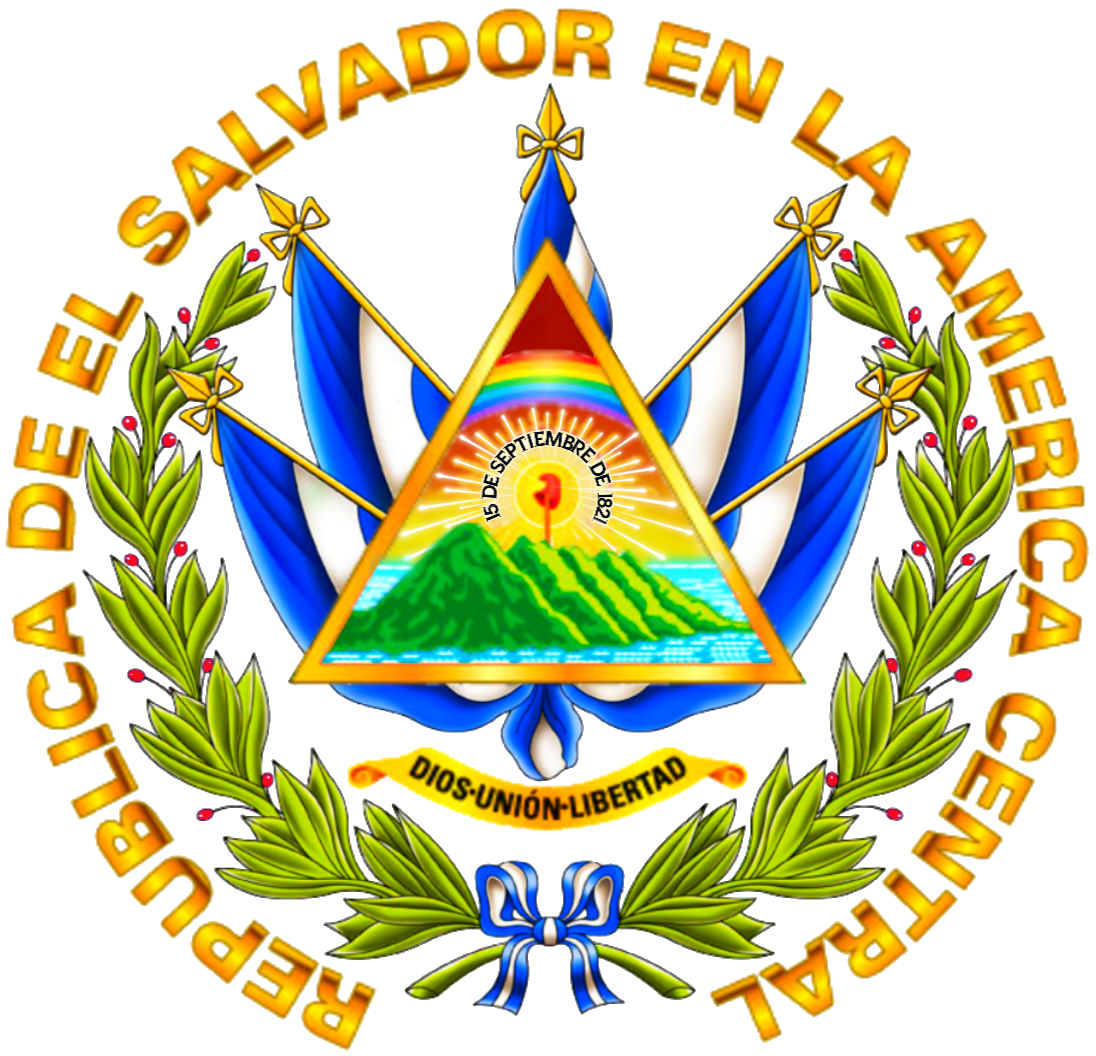
The coat of arms of El Salvador with historically accurate colors and proportions

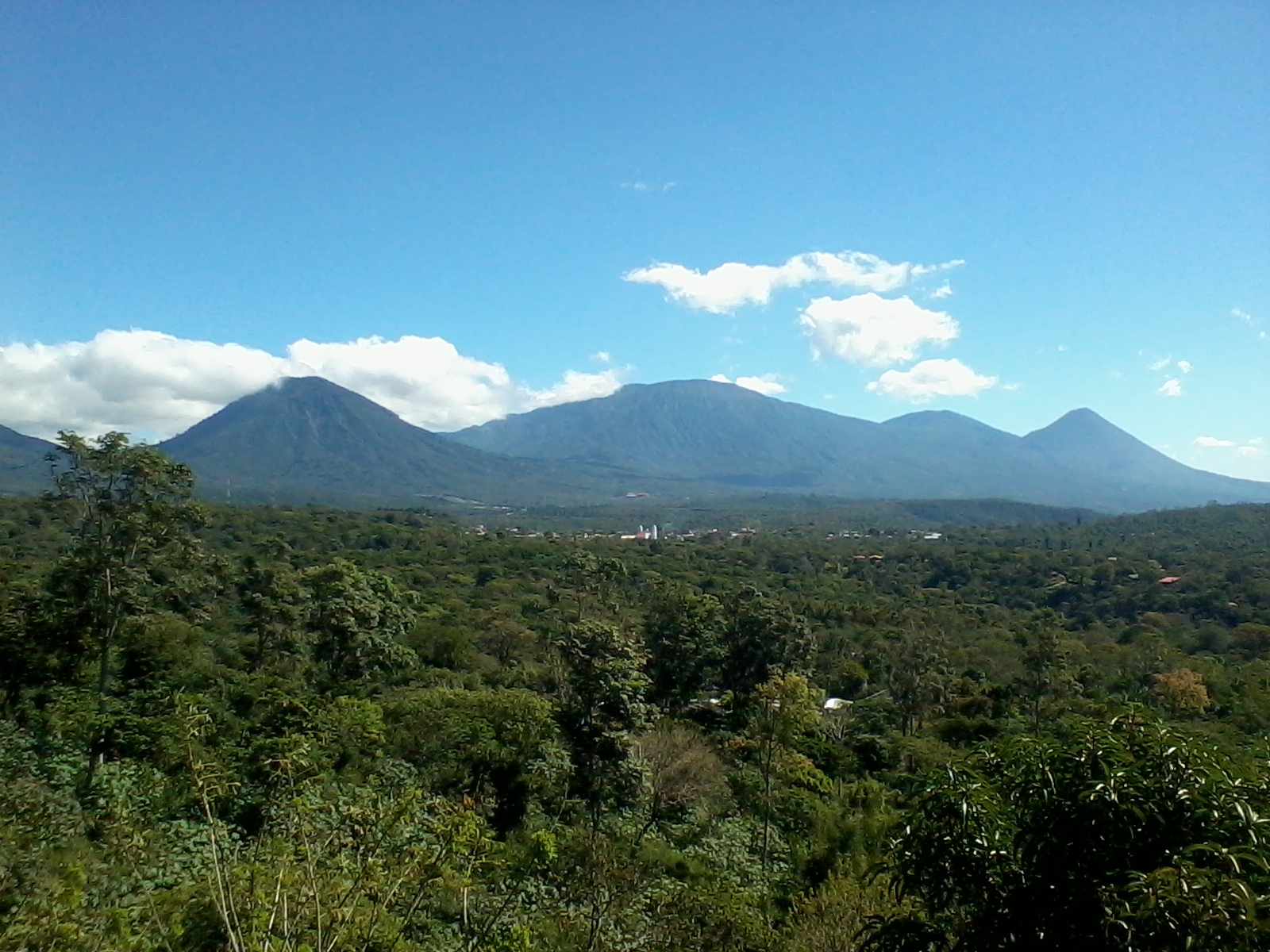
The five rowed volcanos in the coat of arms were inspired by the Cordillera de Apaneca volcanic range

- The coat of arms has the words "REPÚBLICA DE EL SALVADOR EN LA AMÉRICA CENTRAL" (transl. "Republic of El Salvador in Central America") in a bold and heavy sans-serif Boris Black Bloxx typeface, in a golden amber color.
- The national motto, "DIOS UNIÓN LIBERTAD" (transl. "God Union Liberty"), in a bold version of Trajan Roman-type Roman square capitals. The letters are colored amber gold on the civil flag, and black in the coat of arms.
- The date "15 DE SEPTIEMBRE DE 1821" (transl. "September 15, 1821"), the date Central American independence from Spain was declared, also in a bold version of Trajan Roman-type Roman square capitals.

The iconic and imposing coat of arms of El Salvador has Medieval Gothic and Greco-Roman influences, as well as masonic, geographical, biblical, and American Indian symbolic representations, all of which come together in a distinctive, stylized heraldry crest emblem shield design.

Its center consists of a bold golden amber triangle outline, (symbolizing the three branches of the country's government—Executive, Legislative and Judiciary).

Inside of the triangle sits a row of five conic volcanoes, "Soberbios Volcanes", which are covered in healthy variegated vegetation. The vegetation depicts lush and fertile tropical rainforests rising out of the agitated cyan-turquoise Pacific Ocean swells. The five volcanoes are modeled after the Cordillera de Apaneca and symbolize the fellowship of the five original isthmian member states of the United Provinces of Central America—Costa Rica, Guatemala, Honduras, Nicaragua, and El Salvador. The volcanoes are all illuminated yellow on their right sides by sunshine.

Above the volcanoes is a red Phrygian cap, a symbol of liberty, on top of a golden staff. Around the phrygian cap there are beams of light shooting outward, which are rays of Glory, symbolizing the ideals of the Salvadoran people.

The horizon is a dawn "red sky at morning". The date of the Independence Day of El Salvador, 15 September 1821, is written in black letters around the phrygian cap.

On the top, there is a rainbow arch, a biblical symbol of peace, a pact between God and Noah originating from the Book of Genesis as God's covenant with all living creatures to never again destroy life on Earth.

Behind the coat of arms there are five cobalt blue and white striped flags representing the flags of the Federal Republic of Central America. One of the flags is risen straight up behind and over the triangle, hanging loosely around its spear. The other four flags are risen halfway and stretch out like wings from behind the triangle's sides, two on each side and one over another, creating an almost horn-like effect with their ends tied up behind the triangle's bottom.

All of the five flags are each held up and raised with Native American Indigenous golden war spears, symbolizing El Salvador's American Indigenous ancestry and heritage. The spears represent the spirit and heroism of the Lenca and Pipil warriors who defeated the first attempted Spanish conquest of Cuzcatlan. Spanish conquistador Pedro de Alvarado wrote that he was awestruck and spooked in great fear when he saw the massive numbers of American Indigenous warriors with large spears and bows as their weaponry standing their ground in their battle against the invading Spaniards.

Under the triangle, there is a golden amber scroll (historically golden amber) with the national motto of El Salvador—Dios, Unión, Libertad (transl. "God, Union, Liberty")—in boldface black capital letters.

The triangle, flags, and scroll are surrounded by a variegated green laurel wreath of Laurus nobilis tied together with a cobalt blue and white striped ribbon representing the national flag, which symbolizes unity. The laurel wreath is divided into 14 different parts, which symbolize the 14 Departments, the Salvadoran subnational administrative units. The laurel sections start large at the bottom and shrink in size as they go upward.

All this is surrounded by golden amber letters, which form the Spanish words "REPÚBLICA DE EL SALVADOR EN LA AMÉRICA CENTRAL" (transl. "Republic of El Salvador in Central America") in boldface capital letters.

For special occasions, the entire coat of arms of El Salvador is stylized bathed in golden amber or silver. The coat of arms of El Salvador is recognizable in silhouette.

== Historical coat of arms ==
Republic of El Salvador (1877–1912)

Republic of El Salvador (1912–present)

== Gallery ==
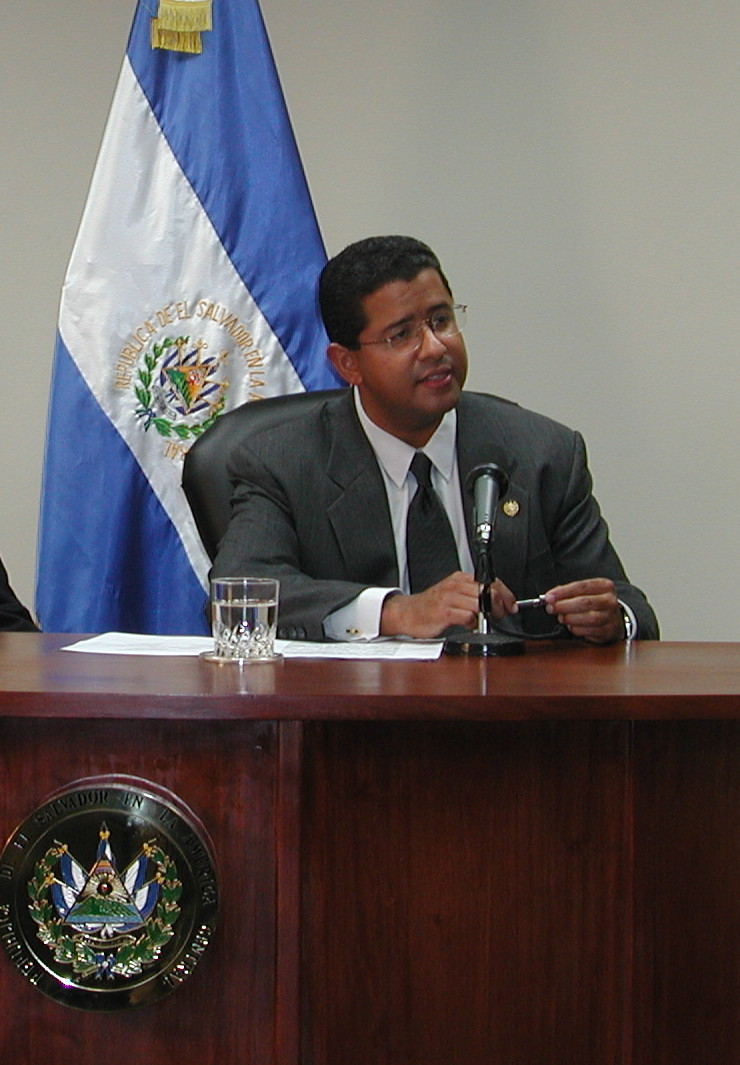
Flag of El Salvador displayed alongside former Salvadoran president Francisco Flores Pérez, 2001

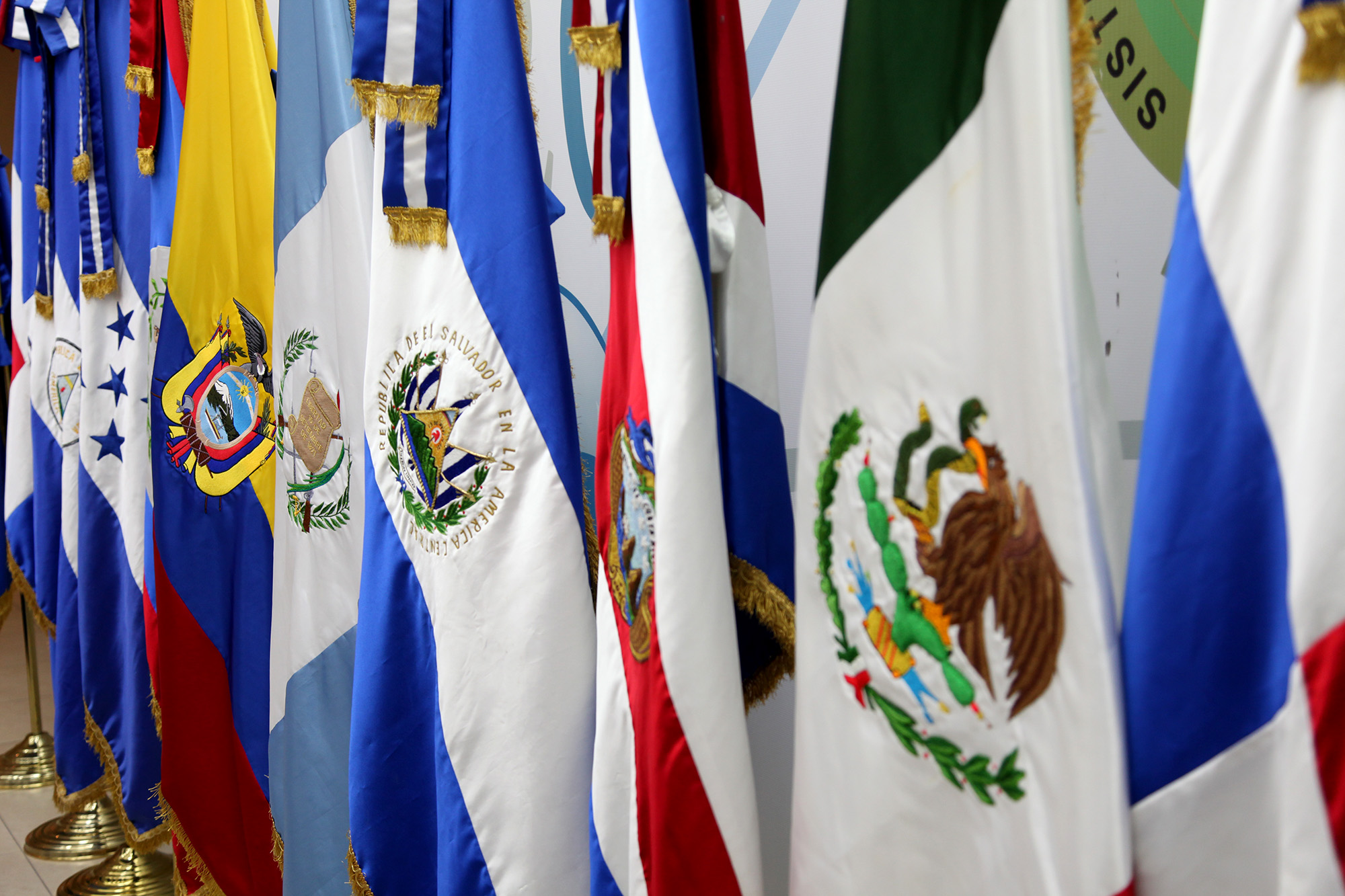
Flag of El Salvador (center) displayed at the Community of Latin American and Caribbean States

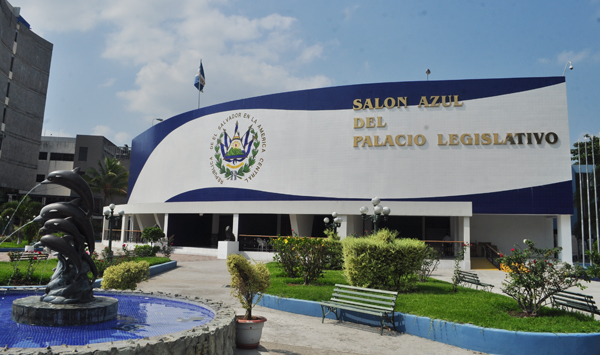
Flag of El Salvador displayed on the Legislative Assembly of El Salvador, San Salvador

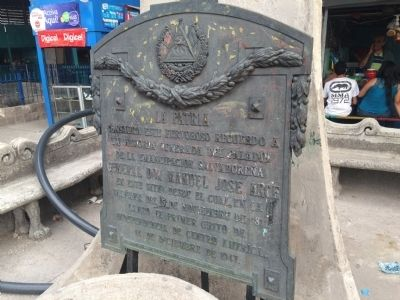
The coat of arms of El Salvador displayed at the site from which, on the morning of November 5, 1811, the first cry for the independence of Central America was launched

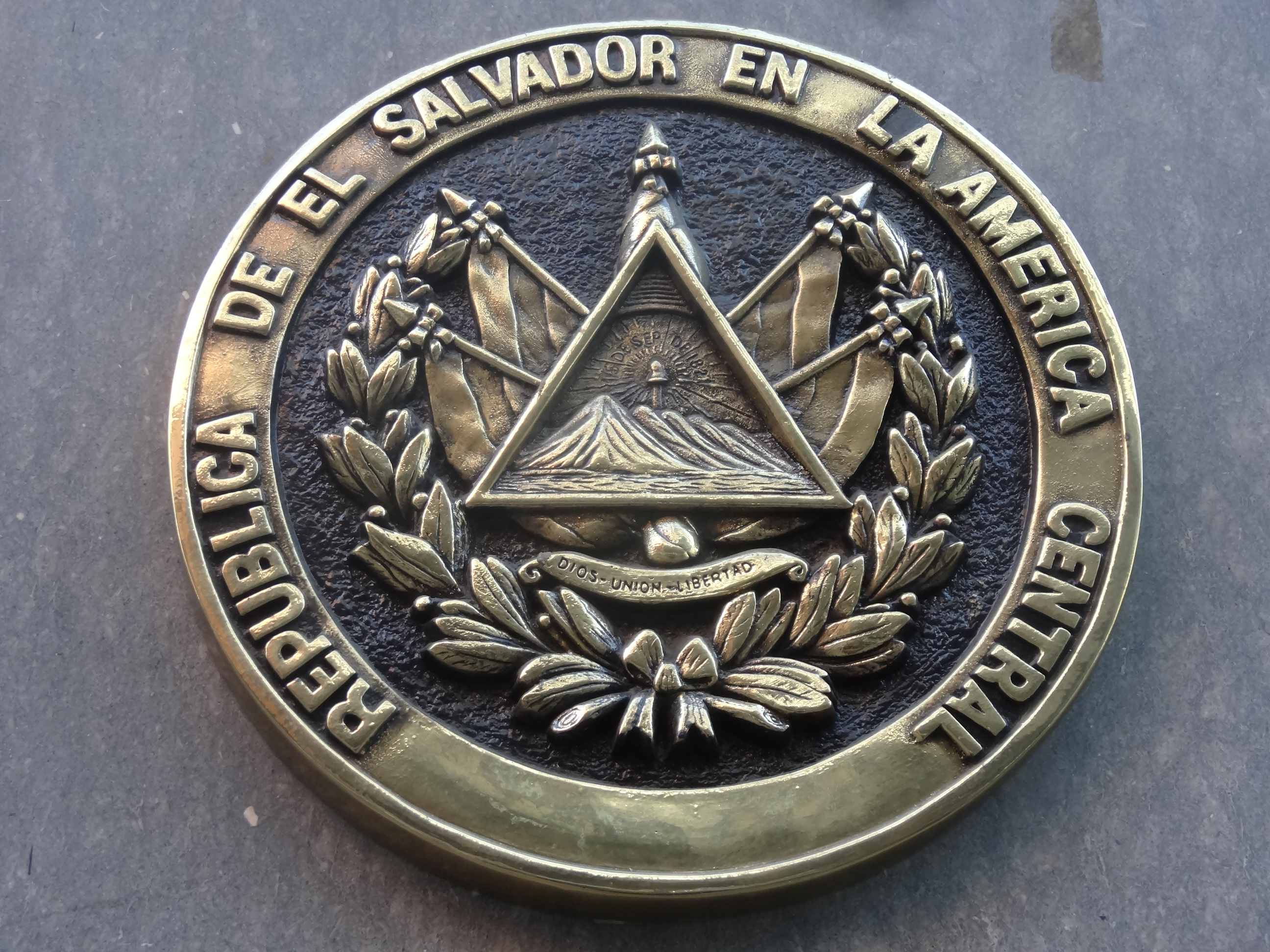
The coat of arms of El Salvador in the Barcelona consulate

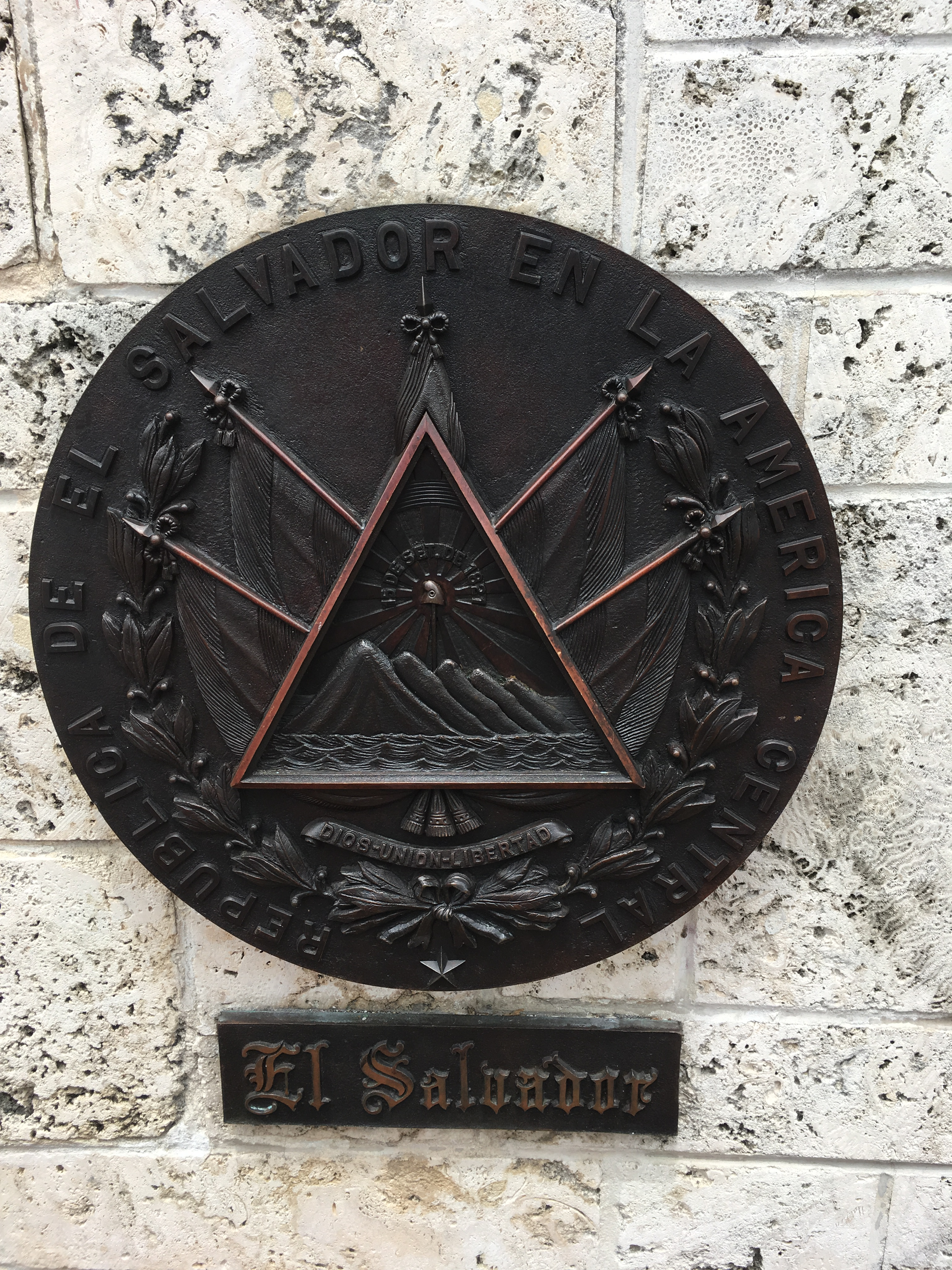
The coat of arms of El Salvador displayed at The Torch of Friendship monument in downtown Miami, Florida

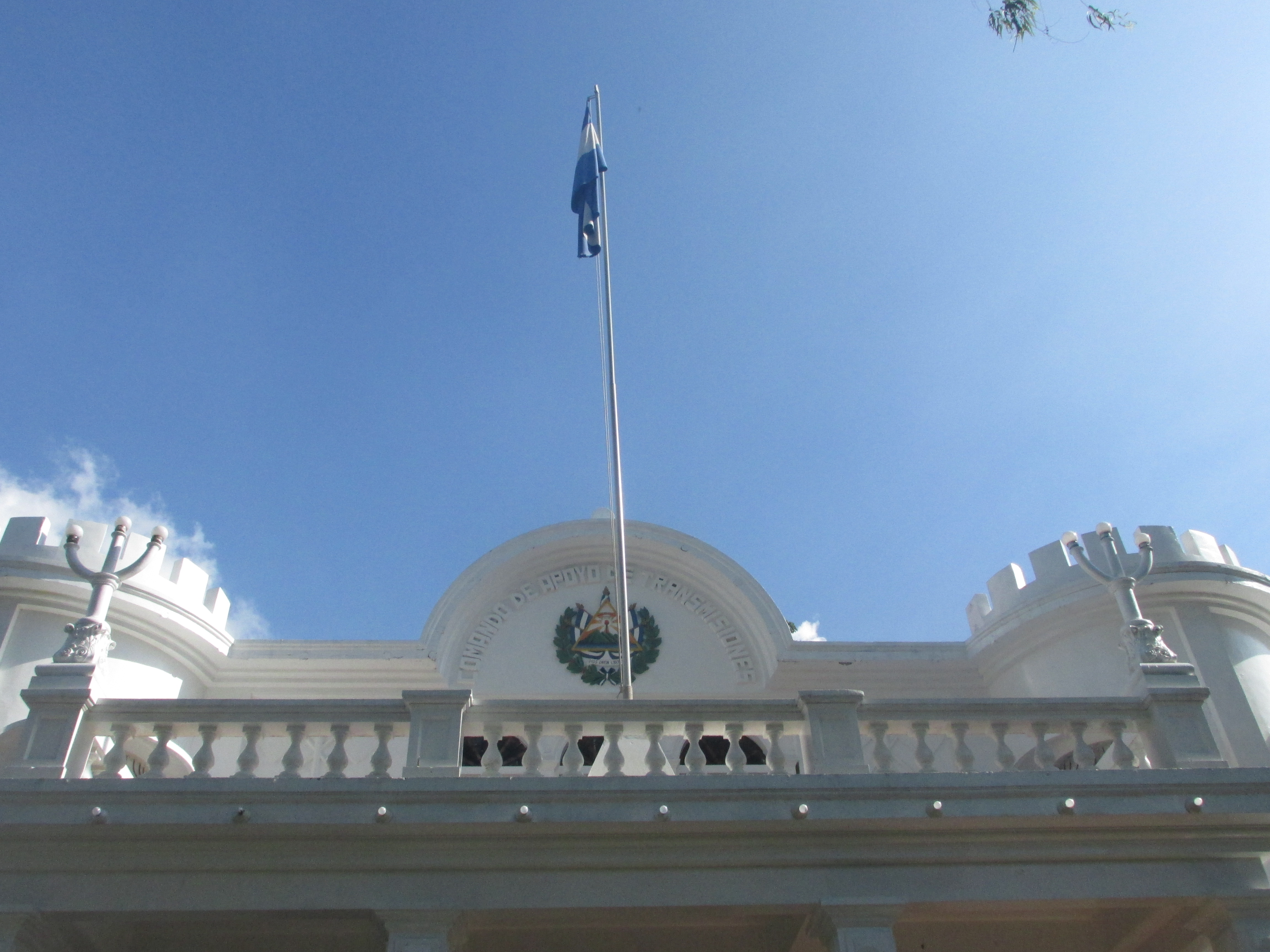
Coat of arms of El Salvador displayed at El Zapote Military Museum, San Salvador

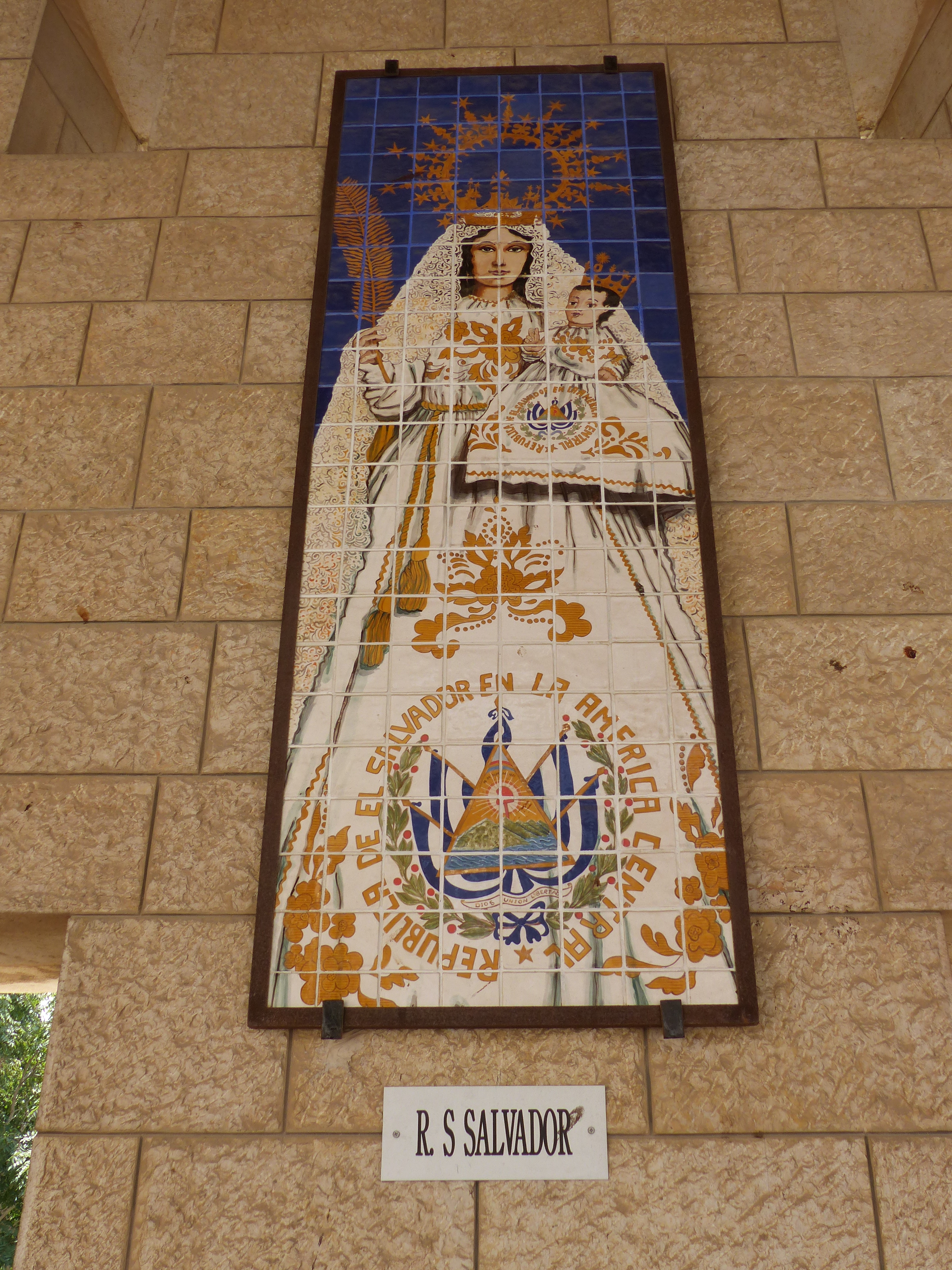
The coat of arms of El Salvador displayed on an azulejo of Our Lady of Peace in Nazareth, Israel

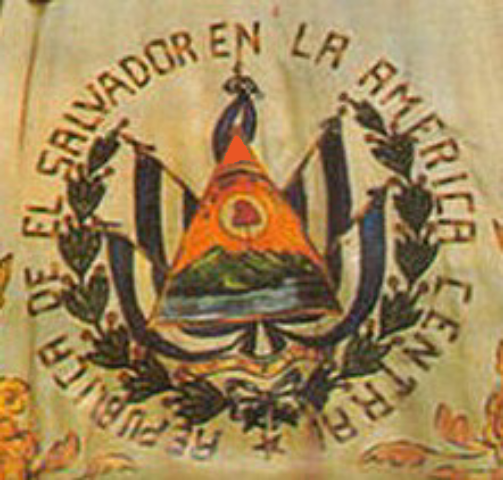
The coat of arms of El Salvador displayed on Our Lady of Peace in the Cathedral Basilica of Queen of Peace, San Miguel

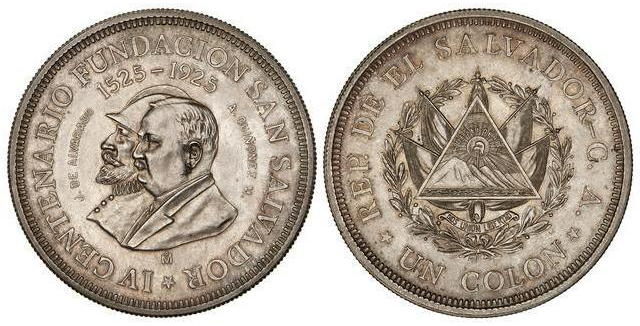
Coat of arms of El Salvador displayed on a 1925 coin

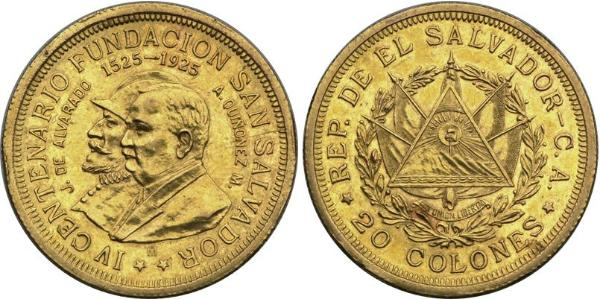
Coat of arms of El Salvador displayed on a 1925 coin

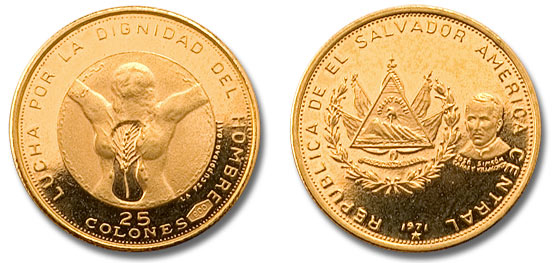
Coat of arms of El Salvador displayed on a 1971 coin

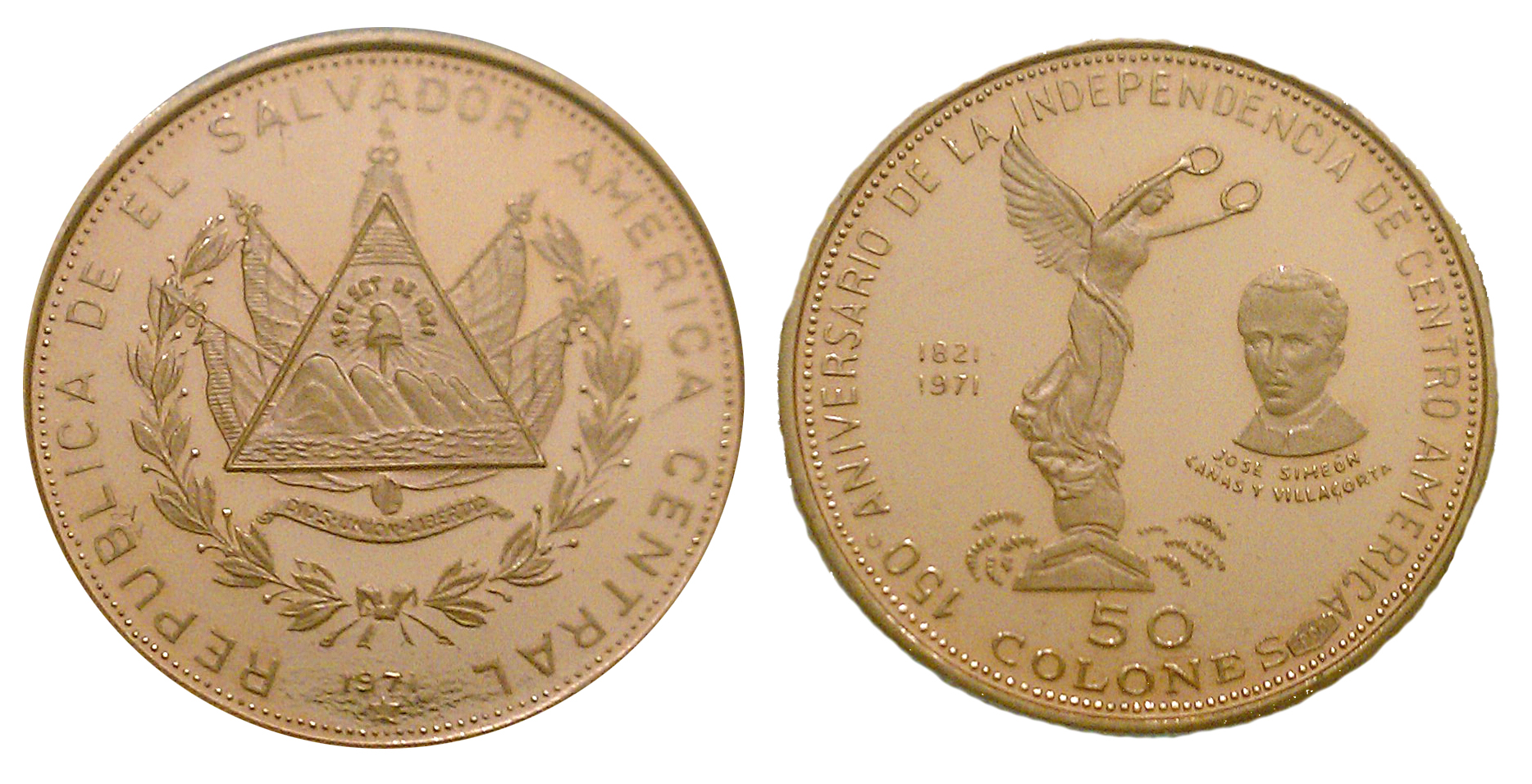
Coat of arms of El Salvador displayed on a 1971 coin

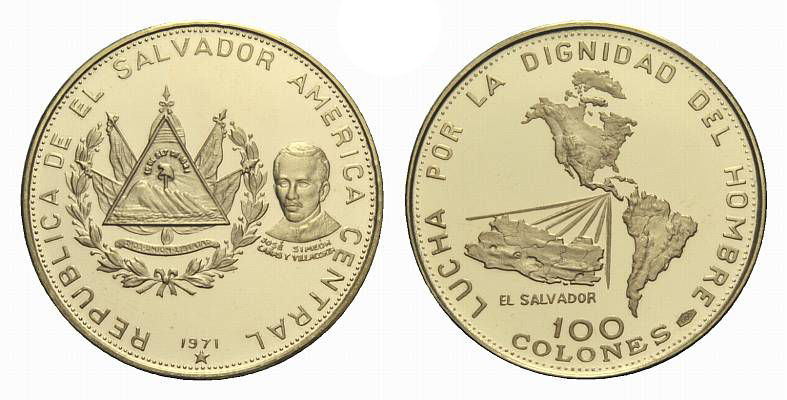
Coat of arms of El Salvador displayed on a 1971 coin

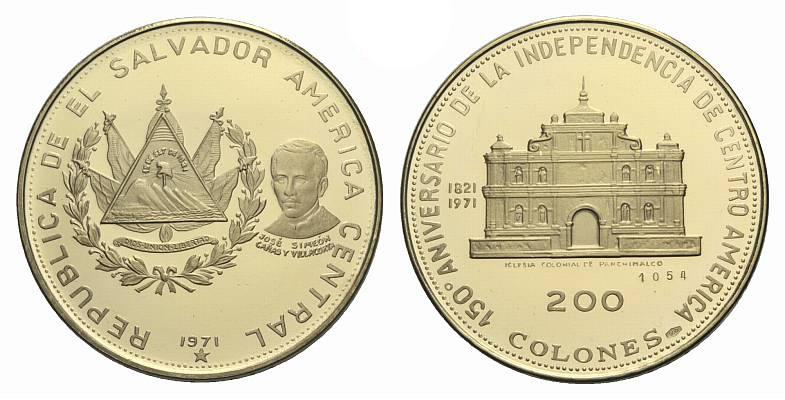
Coat of arms of El Salvador displayed on a 1971 coin

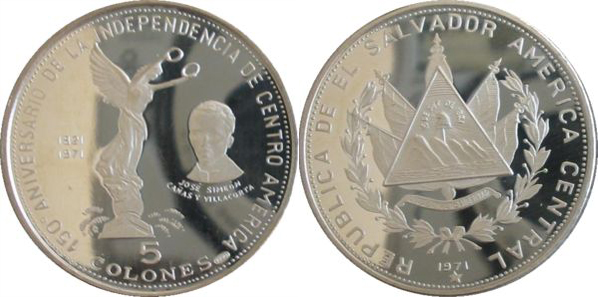
Coat of arms of El Salvador displayed on a 1971 coin

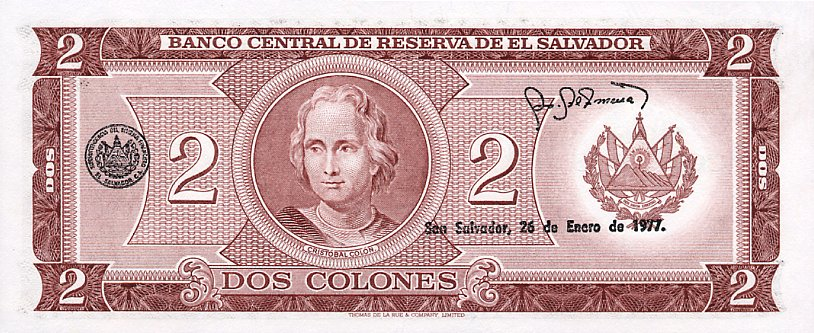
Coat of arms of El Salvador displayed on a 1976 banknote

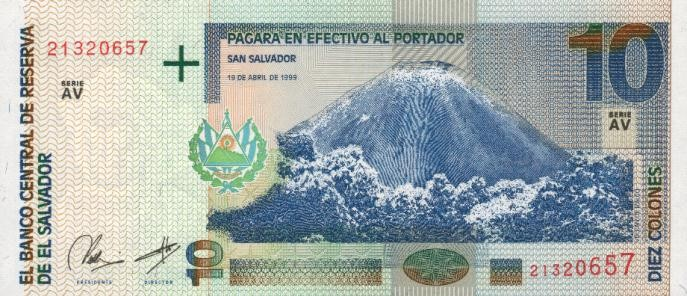
Coat of arms of El Salvador displayed on a 1999 banknote

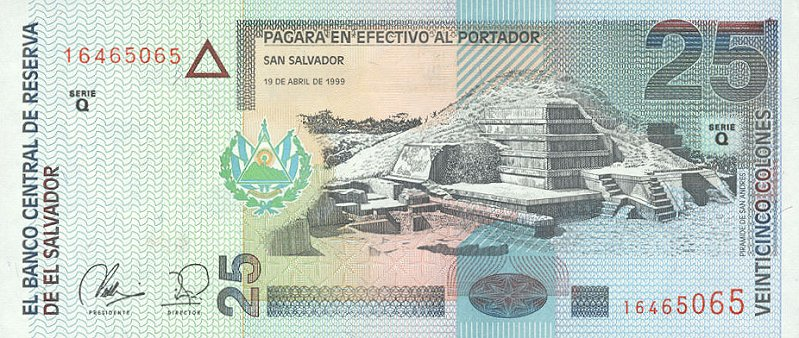
Coat of arms of El Salvador displayed on a 1999 banknote

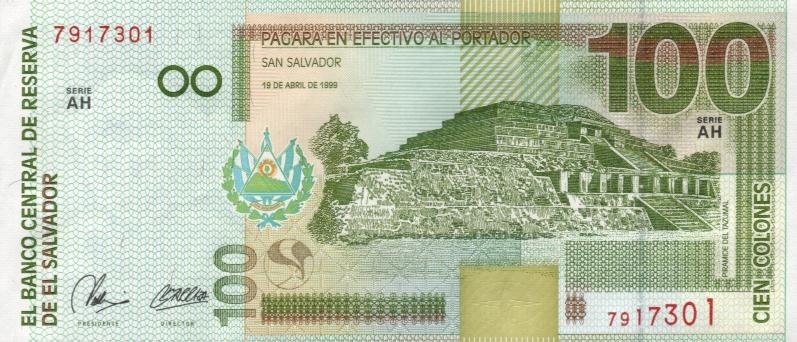
Coat of arms of El Salvador displayed on a 1999 banknote

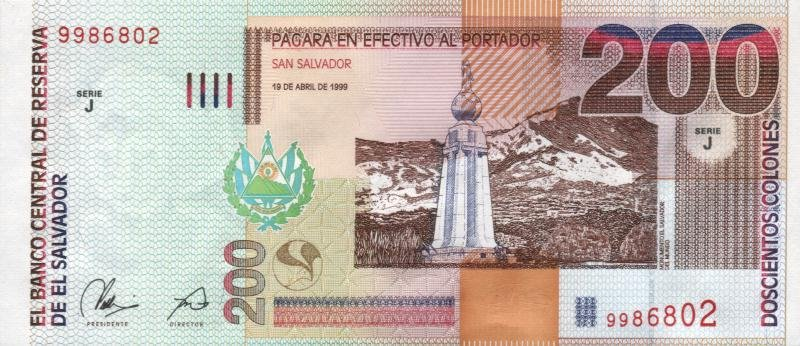
Coat of arms of El Salvador displayed on a 1999 banknote
