= 2011–12 Liga Nacional de Guatemala =

59th professional season of the top-flight football league in Guatemala

Liga Nacional de Guatemala
- Season: 2011–12
- Champions: Apertura: Municipal (29th title); Clausura: Xelajú (5th title)
- Relegated: Zacapa; Juventud Retalteca
- Champions League: Municipal; Xelajú
- Matches: 120
- Goals: 323 (2.69 per match)
- Biggest home win: Apertura: Municipal 5–0 Malacateco
- Biggest away win: Apertura: Zacapa 1–4 Suchitepéquez
- Highest scoring: Apertura: Peñarol 6–2 Suchitepéquez; Clausura: Heredia 6–1 Zacapa

The 2011–12 Liga Nacional de Guatemala was the 59th professional season of the top-flight football league in Guatemala. The season was divided into two championships—the 2011 Apertura and the 2012 Clausura—each in an identical format and each contested by the same 12 teams.

== Format ==
The format for both championships are identical. Each championship will have two stages: a first stage and a playoff stage. The first stage of each championship is a double round-robin format. The teams that finishes 1 and 2 in the standings will advance to the playoffs semifinals, while the teams that finish 3–6 will enter in the quarterfinals. The winner of each quarterfinals will advance to the semifinals. The winners of the semifinals will advance to the finals, which will determine the tournament champion.

== Teams ==
USAC and Xinabajul finished in 11th and 12th place, respectively, in the overall table of last season and were relegated to the Primera División. Taking their places were the two winners of the Primera División promotion playoffs, Petapa and Zacapa.

Location of the 2011–12 Liga Nacional de Fútbol de Guatemala teams

Team	Home city	Stadium	Capacity
Comunicaciones	Guatemala	Cementos Progreso	16,000
Heredia	San José	Julián Tesucún	8,000
Juventud Retalteca	Retalhuleu	Óscar Monterroso	8,000
Malacateco	Malacatán	Santa Lucía	7,000
Marquense	San Marcos	Marquesa de la Ensenada	10,000
Mictlán	Asunción Mita	La Asunción	3,000
Municipal	Guatemala	Mateo Flores	30,000
Peñarol	Huehuetenango	Los Cuchumatanes	5,340
Petapa	San Miguel Petapa	Municipal	7,500
Suchitepéquez	Mazatenango	Carlos Salazar Hijo	12,000
Xelajú	Quetzaltenango	Mario Camposeco	11,000
Zacapa	Zacapa	David Ordóñez Bardales	8,000

== Apertura ==
The 2011 Torneo Apertura began on 9 July 2011 and ended on 18 December 2011.

=== Standings ===
Pos	Team	Pld	W	D	L	GF	GA	GD	Pts	Qualification
1	Suchitepéquez	22	14	1	7	34	21	+13	43	Qualified to the Semifinals
2	Xelajú	22	11	5	6	30	23	+7	38	Qualified to the Semifinals
3	Marquense	22	9	9	4	31	20	+11	36	Qualified to the Quarterfinals
4	Comunicaciones	22	8	11	3	27	20	+7	35	Qualified to the Quarterfinals
5	Heredia	22	10	5	7	35	30	+5	35	Qualified to the Quarterfinals
6	Municipal	22	8	10	4	37	22	+15	34	Qualified to the Quarterfinals
7	Peñarol	22	8	7	7	36	31	+5	31	
8	Malacateco	22	4	10	8	29	42	−13	22	
9	Zacapa	22	5	6	11	27	43	−16	21	
10	Juventud Retalteca	22	4	8	10	24	33	−9	20	
11	Mictlán	22	5	5	12	23	39	−16	20	
12	Petapa	22	3	9	10	24	33	−9	18	

Source: Guatefutbol
Rules for classification: 1) points; 2) goal difference; 3) number of goals scored.

=== Results ===
Home \ Away	COM	HER	JUV	MAL	MAR	MIC	MUN	PEÑ	PET	SUC	XEL	ZAC
Comunicaciones		3–1	1–0	3–1	0–0	1–1	0–0	2–2	2–1	1–0	1–1	4–3
Heredia	2–2		1–1	2–0	3–2	5–1	3–1	2–1	1–0	2–1	1–0	2–0
Juventud Retalteca	1–1	2–3		2–1	0–0	4–1	0–0	1–1	1–1	1–3	1–0	2–0
Malacateco	1–1	2–2	3–1		2–0	0–0	3–3	2–2	2–1	2–2	2–2	1–1
Marquense	1–0	3–1	1–0	1–1		4–0	0–3	3–1	3–0	1–0	2–2	4–0
Mictlán	1–2	1–1	3–1	0–1	0–1		0–0	3–3	1–0	1–0	1–0	2–1
Municipal	1–1	3–1	4–2	5–0	0–0	2–1		2–0	3–0	0–1	1–1	2–0
Peñarol	0–1	2–0	2–0	3–1	0–0	2–1	2–2		2–1	6–2	3–1	2–1
Petapa	0–0	1–1	2–2	2–2	1–1	4–3	1–1	1–1		2–0	2–0	0–1
Suchitepéquez	1–0	1–0	2–0	4–1	2–0	3–0	2–1	1–0	2–1		1–0	2–0
Xelajú	1–0	1–0	1–0	3–0	2–2	2–1	2–1	2–1	2–1	1–0		4–1
Zacapa	1–1	2–1	2–2	2–1	2–2	2–1	2–2	2–0	2–2	1–4	1–2	

Source: Guatefutbol (in Spanish)
Legend: Blue = home team win; Yellow = draw; Red = away team win.

=== Top scorers ===
Pos	Player	Club	Goals
1	(Guatemala) Juan Valenzuela	Zacapa	10
1	(Colombia) Henry Hernández	Heredia	10
3	(Mexico) Miguel Casanova	Peñarol	8
3	(Guatemala) Edwin Villatoro	Suchitepéquez	8
5	(Brazil) Neto Mineiro	Marquense	7
5	(Argentina) Fernando Gallo	Peñarol	7
5	(Guatemala) Tránsito Montepeque	Comunicaciones	7
5	(Uruguay) Carlos Ramírez	Comunicaciones	7

=== Positions by round ===
Team ╲ Round	1	2	3	4	5	6	7	8	9	10	11	12	13	14	15	16	17	18	19	20	21	22
Suchitepéquez	2	7	4	5	3	1	3	2	2	2	1	2	1	2	1	1	1	1	1	1	1	1
Xelajú	4	8	6	11	6	10	6	6	6	5	6	6	5	5	3	5	4	5	5	5	3	2
Marquense	12	5	5	6	8	5	5	5	5	4	2	1	2	1	4	6	6	4	3	4	2	3
Comunicaciones	3	1	1	1	1	2	4	3	3	3	4	4	3	3	5	2	2	2	4	3	4	4
Heredia	5	10	11	7	9	6	9	8	10	7	8	7	7	7	7	7	7	7	6	6	6	5
Municipal	9	3	2	2	4	4	2	4	4	6	5	5	6	6	6	3	3	3	2	2	5	6
Peñarol	1	6	3	4	2	3	1	1	1	1	3	3	4	4	2	4	5	6	7	7	7	7
Malacateco	6	12	8	8	5	7	7	10	9	10	9	11	10	12	10	10	9	8	8	8	8	8
Zacapa	8	2	7	10	10	11	11	12	12	12	11	9	9	10	9	11	11	11	10	9	9	9
Juventud Retalteca	11	9	10	12	11	12	12	11	8	9	10	10	12	9	11	8	8	9	9	10	10	10
Mictlán	7	11	12	9	12	9	10	9	11	11	12	12	11	11	12	12	12	12	12	12	12	11
Petapa	10	4	9	3	7	8	8	7	7	8	7	8	8	8	8	9	10	10	11	11	11	12

Leader
Qualification to the semifinals
Qualification to the quarterfinals

Source: Guatefutbol

=== Playoffs ===
Quarterfinals
4	Comunicaciones	1	0	1 (a)
5	Heredia	1	0	1
3	Marquense	0	0	0
6	Municipal	2	0	2

Semifinals
2	Xelajú MC	0	2	2
4	Comunicaciones	3	1	4
1	Suchitepéquez	1	1	2
6	Municipal	3	0	3

Final
4	Comunicaciones	0	0	0
6	Municipal	2	2	4

=== Quarterfinals ===
==== First legs ====
1 December 2011
15:00 UTC-6

Heredia	1–1	Comunicaciones
Hernández 65'		81' Herrate; (yellow card) 20' (yellow-red card) 89' Márquez

Estadio Julián Tesucún, San José
Attendance: 3,000
Referee: Jonathan Polanco

1 December 2011
20:00 UTC-6

Municipal	2–0	Marquense
Oliva 10'; Quintanilla 16'

Estadio Mateo Flores, Guatemala City
Attendance: 4,789
Referee: Mario Ramírez

==== Second legs ====
4 December 2011
13:00 UTC-6

Marquense	0–0	Municipal
Brown (red card) 88'

Estadio Marquesa de la Ensenada, San Marcos
Attendance: 5,119
Referee: Mario Escobar

Municipal progresses 2–0 on aggregate.

4 December 2011
16:00 UTC-6

Comunicaciones	0–0	Heredia

Estadio Cementos Progreso, Guatemala City
Attendance: 6,993
Referee: Walter López

Comunicaciones progresses on away goals rule.

=== Semifinals ===
==== First legs ====
7 December 2011
20:00 UTC-6

Comunicaciones	3–0	Xelajú MC
Thompson 51'; Ramírez 54'; Ceballos 88'

Estadio Cementos Progreso, Guatemala City
Attendance: 6,651
Referee: Oscar Reyna

8 December 2011
20:00 UTC-6

Municipal	3–1	Suchitepéquez
Castillo 21'; Lopez 53'; Quintanilla 64'		4' López

Estadio Mateo Flores, Guatemala City
Attendance: 10,963
Referee: Ruben Castellanos

==== Second legs ====
10 December 2011
20:00 UTC-6

Xelajú MC	2–1	Comunicaciones
Israel Silva 8'; Leal 13'		77' Arreola

Estadio Mario Camposeco, Quetzaltenango
Attendance: 3,395
Referee: Mario Escobar

Comunicaciones progresses 4–2 on aggregate.

11 December 2011
11:00 UTC-6

Suchitepéquez	1–0	Municipal
Villatoro 1'		(yellow card) 63' (yellow-red card) 86' Evandro Ferreira

Estadio Carlos Salazar Hijo, Mazatenango
Attendance: 6,131
Referee: Jonathan Polanco

Municipal progresses 3–2 on aggregate.

=== Finals ===
==== First leg ====
15 December 2011
20:05 UTC-6

Municipal	2–0	Comunicaciones
Oliva 37'; Quintanilla 44'		(yellow card) 41' (yellow-red card) 88' Morales

Estadio Mateo Flores, Guatemala City
Attendance: 17,751
Referee: Jonathan Polanco

==== Second leg ====
18 December 2011
16:20 UTC-6

Comunicaciones	0–2	Municipal
		16' Oliva; 76' Samayoa

Estadio Cementos Progreso, Guatemala City
Attendance: 6,775
Referee: Oscar Reyna

2011 Apertura winner

29th title

== Clausura ==
The 2012 Torneo Clausura will begin on 14 January 2012 and will end in May 2012.

=== Personnel and sponsoring ===
Team	Chairman	Head coach	Kitmaker	Shirt sponsor
Comunicaciones	(Mexico)	(Costa Rica) Ronald Gonzales	Joma	TBA
Heredia	TBD	TBA	TBA	TBA
Juventud Retalteca	TBD	(Guatemala) Manuel Castañeda	DMS	TBA
Malacateco	TBD	(Argentina) Julián Trujillo	TBA	TBA
Marquense	TBD	(Guatemala) Francisco Melgar	Lotto Sport Italia	TBA
Mictlán	TBD	(Guatemala) Albertico Salguero	TBA	TBA
Municipal	TBD	(Costa Rica) Javier Delgado	DMS	Pepsi, Banrural
Peñarol La Mesilla	TBD	(Argentina) Pablo Centrone	TBA	TBA
Petapa	TBD	(Argentina) Ramiro Cepeda	TBA	TBA
Suchitepéquez	TBD	(Uruguay) Richard Pressa	Milan	TBA
Xelajú	TBD	(Costa Rica) Hernán Medford	MR	TBA
Zacapa	TBD	(Chile) Sergio Pardo	TBA	TBA

=== Standings ===
Pos	Team	Pld	W	D	L	GF	GA	GD	Pts	Qualification
1	Comunicaciones	22	13	3	6	39	23	+16	42	Qualified to the Semifinals
2	Marquense	22	10	8	4	38	18	+20	38	Qualified to the Semifinals
3	Xelajú	22	8	10	4	27	22	+5	34	Qualified to the Quarterfinals
4	Municipal	22	8	7	7	29	25	+4	31	Qualified to the Quarterfinals
5	Suchitepéquez	22	8	7	7	33	31	+2	31	Qualified to the Quarterfinals
6	Heredia	22	9	4	9	30	35	−5	31	Qualified to the Quarterfinals
7	Petapa	22	8	6	8	23	23	0	30	
8	Mictlán	22	9	2	11	25	37	−12	29	
9	Malacateco	22	7	6	9	21	30	−9	27	
10	Peñarol	22	6	7	9	32	26	+6	25	
11	Zacapa	22	6	7	9	28	36	−8	25	
12	Juventud Retalteca	22	4	5	13	20	39	−19	17	

Updated to match(es) played on 29 April 2012. Source: Guatefutbol
Rules for classification: 1) points; 2) goal difference; 3) number of goals scored.

=== Results ===
Home \ Away	COM	HER	JUV	MAL	MAR	MIC	MUN	PEÑ	PET	SUC	XEL	ZAC
Comunicaciones		3–0	3–0	2–1	2–0	4–1	2–0	2–0	1–0	4–3	3–1	2–2
Heredia	2–2		2–1	3–1	2–0	2–1	1–0	3–1	1–0	1–1	1–1	6–1
Juventud Retalteca	1–2	1–2		2–0	1–4	2–1	1–1	1–0	1–2	2–0	2–2	1–2
Malacateco	1–1	2–1	2–0		0–0	2–1	1–0	1–0	1–1	1–0	0–0	3–3
Marquense	1–0	4–0	4–0	1–0		6–0	3–3	2–1	3–2	0–0	3–4	4–0
Mictlán	1–0	2–0	3–0	2–1	0–0		0–1	1–0	1–0	2–1	1–2	3–0
Municipal	2–1	4–2	1–0	4–0	1–1	1–2		1–1	0–1	0–0	1–0	2–1
Peñarol	2–0	3–0	2–2	2–0	0–1	5–0	3–3		2–0	4–0	2–2	1–1
Petapa	0–1	1–0	2–0	1–1	0–0	3–2	1–1	2–0		2–1	0–0	2–1
Suchitepéquez	2–4	1–0	3–1	2–0	0–0	1–1	3–2	3–2	2–2		3–0	4–2
Xelajú	1–0	4–0	1–1	2–0	1–1	2–0	1–0	1–1	1–0	1–1		0–0
Zacapa	2–0	1–1	0–0	2–3	1–0	4–0	0–1	0–0	3–1	0–2	2–0	

Updated to match(es) played on 29 April 2012. Source: Guatefutbol (in Spanish)
Legend: Blue = home team win; Yellow = draw; Red = away team win.

=== Top scorers ===
Pos	Player	Club	Goals
1	(Colombia) Henry Hernández	Heredia	16
2	(Colombia) Carlos Asprilla	Mictlán	11
2	(Brazil) Terencio de Oliveira	Marquense	11
2	(Argentina) Fernando Gallo	Peñarol	11
2	(Brazil) Israel Silva	Xelajú	11
5	(Uruguay) Gonzalo Gutiérrez	Suchitepéquez	10
5	(Guatemala) Juan Valenzuela	Zacapa	10
5	(Brazil) Sandro Zamboni	Petapa	10
9	(Guatemala) Hessler Archila	Suchitepéquez	9
9	(Costa Rica) Diego Estrada	Comunicaciones	9
9	(Guatemala) Jorge Estrada	Marquense	9

=== Positions by round ===
Team ╲ Round	1	2	3	4	5	6	7	8	9	10	11	12	13	14	15	16	17	18	19	20	21	22
Comunicaciones	3	4	6	4	2	2	2	2	2	2	2	2	2	2	2	1	2	1	1	1	1	1
Marquense	1	1	1	1	1	1	1	1	1	1	1	1	1	1	1	2	1	2	2	2	2	2
Xelajú	10	10	5	5	4	7	6	7	5	6	6	4	5	5	3	4	3	4	3	3	3	3
Municipal	4	2	3	6	5	8	8	6	7	4	5	6	6	8	6	8	5	6	4	5	6	4
Suchitepéquez	6	6	4	7	6	3	5	5	6	8	8	7	7	6	7	5	8	5	8	6	7	5
Heredia	5	8	7	3	7	4	3	3	3	3	3	5	3	4	5	3	4	3	5	4	4	6
Petapa	9	9	11	10	11	11	10	8	9	7	9	9	8	7	8	6	9	7	6	7	8	7
Mictlán	12	12	12	12	12	12	12	12	12	12	11	11	11	9	9	9	7	9	7	8	5	8
Malacateco	11	5	8	8	8	5	4	4	4	5	4	3	4	3	4	7	6	8	9	9	9	9
Peñarol	7	11	9	9	10	9	9	10	8	10	7	8	10	10	11	10	11	11	10	10	10	10
Zacapa	8	7	10	11	9	10	11	11	11	9	10	10	9	11	10	11	10	10	11	11	11	11
Juventud Retalteca	2	3	2	2	3	6	7	9	10	11	12	12	12	12	12	12	12	12	12	12	12	12

Leader
Qualification to the semifinals
Qualification to the quarterfinals

Source: Guatefutbol

=== Playoffs ===
Quarterfinals
4	Municipal	1	3	4
5	Suchitepéquez	2	0	2
6	Heredia	2	2	4
3	Xelajú	1	6	7

Semifinals
1	Comunicaciones	0	1	1
4	Municipal	0	2	2
2	Marquense	0	1	1
3	Club Xelajú	1	1	2

Final
4	Municipal	1	1	2 (1)
3	Club Xelajú	0	2	2 (3)

=== Quarterfinals ===
==== First legs ====
3 May 2012
20:00 UTC-6

Suchitepéquez	2–1	Municipal
Guzmán 55'; Cardozo 68'	Report	Rodríguez 83'

Estadio Carlos Salazar Hijo

3 May 2012
22:30 UTC-6

Heredia	2–1	Club Xelajú
Márquez 65'; Hernández 68'	Report	Israel Silva 7'

Estadio Julián Tesucún

==== Second legs ====
7 May 2012
01:00 UTC-6

Municipal	3–0	Suchitepéquez
Lopez 49'; Castillo 71'; Oliva 90+1'	Report

Estadio Mateo Flores

7 May 2012
01:00 UTC-6

Club Xelajú	6–2	Heredia
Israel Silva 13', 21', 71' (pen.), 90'; Morales 33', 53'	Report	Ramírez 10'; Miranda 80'

Estadio Mario Camposeco

=== Semifinals ===
==== First legs ====
11 May 2012
03:00 UTC-6

Municipal	0–0	Comunicaciones

Estadio Mateo Flores

11 May 2012
03:00 UTC-6

Club Xelajú	1–0	Marquense
Israel Silva 60'

Estadio Mario Camposeco

==== Second legs ====
13 May 2012
19:00 UTC-6

Marquense	1–1	Club Xelajú
Brown 53'		Javier Melgar 38' (o.g.)

Estadio Marquesa de la Ensenada

14 May 2012
01:00 UTC-6

Comunicaciones	1–2	Municipal
Montepeque 24'		Flores 4'; Oliva 56'

Estadio Cementos Progreso

=== Finals ===
==== First leg ====
17 May 2012
03:00 UTC-6

Municipal	1–0	Club Xelajú
Quintanilla 84'

Estadio Mateo Flores

==== Second leg ====
20 May 2012
03:00 UTC-6

Club Xelajú	2–1 (a.e.t.)	Municipal
Israel Silva 7'; Caal 78'		León 60'
Penalties
	3–1

Estadio Mario Camposeco

2012 Clausura winner

5th title

== Aggregate table ==
Pos	Team	Pld	W	D	L	GF	GA	GD	Pts	Qualification or relegation
1	Comunicaciones	44	21	14	9	66	43	+23	77	
2	Marquense	44	19	17	8	69	38	+31	74	
3	Suchitepéquez	44	22	8	14	67	52	+15	74	
4	Xelajú	44	19	15	10	57	45	+12	72	Qualification for 2012–13 CONCACAF Champions League Group Stage
5	Heredia	44	19	9	16	65	65	0	66	
6	Municipal	44	16	17	11	66	46	+20	65	Qualification for 2012–13 CONCACAF Champions League Group Stage
7	Peñarol	44	14	14	16	68	57	+11	56	
8	Malacateco	44	11	16	17	50	72	−22	49	
9	Mictlán	44	14	7	23	48	76	−28	49	
10	Petapa	44	11	15	18	47	56	−9	48	
11	Zacapa (R)	44	11	13	20	55	79	−24	46	Relegation to the Primera División
12	Juventud Retalteca (R)	44	8	13	23	44	72	−28	37	Relegation to the Primera División

Updated to match(es) played on 29 April 2012. Source: Guatefutbol
Rules for classification: 1) points; 2) goal difference; 3) number of goals scored.
(R) Relegated
