= 2009–10 Liga Nacional de Guatemala =

57th professional season of the top-flight football league in Guatemala

Liga Nacional de Guatemala
- Season: 2009–10
- Dates: 1 August 2009 – 15 May 2010
- Champions: Apertura: Municipal (27th title); Clausura: Municipal (28th title)
- Relegated: Jalapa; Zacapa
- CONCACAF Champions League: Municipal; Xelajú

The 2009–10 Liga Nacional de Guatemala was the 57th professional season of the top-flight football league in Guatemala. The season was divided into two championships—the 2009 Apertura and the 2010 Clausura—each in an identical format and each contested by the same 12 teams.

== Format ==
The format for both championships are identical. Each championship will have two stages: a first stage and a playoff stage. The first stage of each championship is a double round-robin format. The teams that finishes 1 and 2 in the standings will advance to the payoffs semifinals, while the teams that finish 3–6 will enter in the quarterfinals. The winner of each quarterfinals will advance to the semifinals. The winners of the semifinals will advance to the finals, which will determine the tournament champion.

== Teams ==
Location of the 2009–10 Liga Nacional de Fútbol de Guatemala teams

Team	Home city	Stadium	Capacity
Comunicaciones	Guatemala	Cementos Progreso	16,000
Heredia	San José	Julian Tesucun	8,000
Jalapa	Jalapa	Las Flores	5,000
Juventud Retalteca	Retalhuleu	Óscar Monterroso	8,000
Marquense	San Marcos	Marquesa de la Ensenada	10,000
Municipal	Guatemala	Mateo Flores	30,000
Peñarol La Mesilla	Huehuetenango	Los Cuchumatanes	5,340
Suchitepéquez	Mazatenango	Carlos Salazar Hijo	12,000
Universidad San Carlos	Guatemala	Revolución USAC	5,000
Xelajú	Quetzaltenango	Mario Camposeco	11,000
Xinabajul	Huehuetenango	Los Cuchumatanes	5,340
Zacapa	Zacapa	David Ordoñez Bardales	10,000

== Apertura ==
The Torneo Apertura is the first championship of the season. It began on August 1, 2009, and ended on December 20, 2009.

Pos	Team	Pld	W	D	L	GF	GA	GD	Pts	Qualification
1	Xelajú	22	12	3	7	33	24	+9	39	Qualified to the Semifinals
2	Municipal	22	10	7	5	30	20	+10	37	Qualified to the Semifinals
3	Marquense	22	10	7	5	31	27	+4	37	Qualified to the Quarterfinals
4	Heredia	22	10	5	7	40	28	+12	35	Qualified to the Quarterfinals
5	Juventud Retalteca	22	10	5	7	35	25	+10	35	Qualified to the Quarterfinals
6	Comunicaciones	22	8	8	6	30	22	+8	32	Qualified to the Quarterfinals
7	Suchitepéquez	22	9	5	8	32	27	+5	32	
8	Xinabajul	22	8	4	10	22	30	−8	28	
9	Jalapa	22	6	9	7	20	25	−5	27	
10	Zacapa	22	8	2	12	24	45	−21	26	
11	USAC	22	3	9	10	18	27	−9	18	
12	Peñarol	20	4	4	12	22	37	−15	16	

Rules for classification: 1) points; 2) goal difference; 3) number of goals scored.

=== Top scorers ===
Pos	Player	Team	Goals
1	(Colombia) Henry Javier Hernández	Juventud Retalteca	19
2	(Guatemala) Tránsito Montepeque	Comunicaciones	14
3	(Honduras) Nelson Martín Crossa	Municipal	12
4	(Honduras) Mario Castellanos	Heredia	11
5	(Guatemala) Freddy García	Heredia	9
5	(Guatemala) Jonny Jeffersone Brown Fajardo	Marquense	9
7	(Guatemala) Mário Rodriguez	Municipal	8
7	(Mexico) Carlos Kamiani Félix	Universidad de San Carlos	8
9	(Costa Rica) Jhonny Cubero	Xelajú	7
10	(Guatemala) Oscar Isaula	Zacapa	6

=== Playoffs ===
Quarterfinals
3	Marquense	0	2	2
6	Comunicaciones	2	1	3
4	Heredia	5	2	7
5	Juventud Retalteca	4	0	4

Semifinals
1	Xelajú	0	1	1
6	Comunicaciones (a)	0	1	1
2	Municipal	1	1	2
4	Heredia	0	0	0

Final
6	Comunicaciones	0	0	0
2	Municipal	1	0	1

2009 Apertura winner
Municipal
27th title

== Clausura ==
The Torneo Clausura is the second championship of the season. It began on January 15, 2010, and ended on May 15, 2010.

Pos	Team	Pld	W	D	L	GF	GA	GD	Pts	Qualification
1	Comunicaciones	22	12	4	6	37	22	+15	40	Qualified to the Semifinals
2	Xelajú	22	11	6	5	32	26	+6	39	Qualified to the Semifinals
3	Suchitepéquez	22	10	6	6	25	22	+3	36	Qualified to the Quarterfinals
4	Municipal	22	9	5	8	25	19	+6	32	Qualified to the Quarterfinals
5	USAC	22	8	8	6	28	23	+5	32	Qualified to the Quarterfinals
6	Peñarol	22	8	7	7	30	25	+5	31	Qualified to the Quarterfinals
7	Juventud Retalteca	22	9	4	9	20	21	−1	31	
8	Jalapa	22	6	8	8	24	29	−5	26	
9	Marquense	22	6	8	8	24	29	−5	26	
9	Heredia	22	7	3	12	26	34	−8	24	
11	Xinabajul	22	5	8	9	25	36	−11	23	
12	Zacapa	22	6	3	13	24	34	−10	21	

Updated to match(es) played on April 7, 2010. Source: espn.com
Rules for classification: 1st points; 2nd goal difference; 3rd goals scored

=== Results ===
Home \ Away	COM	HER	JAL	JUV	MAR	MUN	PEÑ	SUC	USC	XEL	XIN	ZAC
Comunicaciones		3–0	2–1	4–0	5–1	1–0	2–0	1–2	1–0	1–0	3–2	2–0
Heredia	0–1		3–0	1–0	2–0	2–1	1–3	4–1	1–2	2–3	3–1	2–4
Jalapa	1–1	3–0		1–0	1–1	0–0	1–0	1–1	0–0	0–0	4–1	0–1
Juventud Retalteca	2–0	0–0	2–0		1–0	0–0	1–0	0–0	4–1	4–1	2–0	1–0
Marquense	1–0	3–2	1–0	0–0		1–1	1–2	3–1	1–1	4–0	1–1	2–1
Municipal	2–1	4–0	1–1	3–0	1–1		1–0	2–0	0–0	0–1	2–0	1–0
Peñarol	2–2	1–0	3–3	3–0	2–2	3–1		1–0	2–1	3–4	0–0	3–0
Suchitepéquez	2–1	1–1	1–3	1–0	2–0	2–0	0–0		3–0	1–0	3–2	2–2
USAC	3–2	2–0	4–0	0–0	1–0	0–2	1–1	2–0		0–0	3–1	4–1
Xelajú	2–2	1–0	4–1	2–0	0–0	2–1	1–0	0–1	3–2		3–0	2–1
Xinabajul	1–1	1–1	2–1	2–0	2–1	2–1	2–2	0–0	0–0	1–1		3–1
Zacapa	0–1	1–0	1–2	2–1	3–1	0–1	0–1	0–1	1–1	2–2	3–1	

Updated to match(es) played on April 7, 2010. Source: (in Spanish)
Legend: Blue = home team win; Yellow = draw; Red = away team win.

=== Playoffs ===
Quarterfinals
3	Suchitepéquez	1	2	3
6	Peñarol La Mesilla	1	1	2
5	Universidad	3	0	3
4	Municipal	2	2	4

Semifinals
2	Xelajú	0	2	2 (3)
3	Suchtepéquez	2	0	2 (1)
4	Municipal	2	1	3
1	Comunicaciones	1	1	2

Final
2	Xelajú	1	0	1
4	Municipal	3	4	7

2010 Clausura winner
Municipal
28th title

== Aggregate table ==
Pos	Team	Pld	W	D	L	GF	GA	GD	Pts	Qualification or relegation
1	Xelajú	44	23	10	11	65	49	+16	79	2010–11 CONCACAF Champions League preliminary round (Note: Since Municipal won both championships, Xelaju qualified for 2011–12 CONCACAF Champions League as the runner-up with better aggregate record.)
2	Comunicaciones	44	20	12	12	67	44	+23	72	
3	Municipal	44	19	12	13	55	39	+16	69	2010–11 CONCACAF Champions League Group Stage
4	Juventud Retalteca	44	19	9	16	55	46	+9	66	
5	Suchitepéquez	44	18	12	14	56	50	+6	66	
6	Marquense	44	16	15	13	56	56	0	63	
7	Heredia	44	17	8	19	66	62	+4	59	
8	Xinabajul	44	13	12	19	47	66	−19	51	
9	USAC	44	11	17	16	46	50	−4	50	
10	Peñarol	44	12	11	21	52	62	−10	47	
11	Jalapa (R)	44	12	17	15	44	54	−10	47 (Note: Jalapa was docked six points.)	Relegation to the Liga de Ascenso
12	Zacapa (R)	44	14	5	25	48	79	−31	47	Relegation to the Liga de Ascenso

Updated to match(es) played on 15 May 2010. Source: GuateFutbol.com
Rules for classification: 1st points; 2nd goal difference; 3rd goals scored
(R) Relegated
