= 2010–11 Liga Nacional de Guatemala =

58th professional season of the top-flight football league in Guatemala

Liga Nacional de Guatemala
- Season: 2010–11
- Champions: Apertura: Comunicaciones (23rd title); Clausura: Comunicaciones (24th title)
- Relegated: USAC; Xinabajul
- 2011–12 CONCACAF Champions League: Comunicaciones; Municipal
- Matches: 132
- Goals: 320 (2.42 per match)
- Biggest home win: Suchitepéquez 7–0 USAC (September 19)
- Biggest away win: Xinabajul 0–3 Marquense (July 24); Comunicaciones 1–4 Municipal (September 19); Malacateco 0–3 Heredia (October 31)
- Highest scoring: Suchitepéquez 4–3 Marquense (September 1); Suchitepéquez 7–0 USAC (September 19)

The 2010–11 Liga Nacional de Guatemala was the 58th professional season of the top-flight football league in Guatemala. The season was divided into two championships—the 2010 Apertura and the 2011 Clausura—each in an identical format and each contested by the same 12 teams.

== Format ==
The format for both championships are identical. Each championship will have two stages: a first stage and a playoff stage. The first stage of each championship is a double round-robin format. The teams that finishes 1 and 2 in the standings will advance to the playoffs semifinals, while the teams that finish 3–6 will enter in the quarterfinals. The winner of each quarterfinals will advance to the semifinals. The winners of the semifinals will advance to the finals, which will determine the tournament champion.

== Teams ==
Location of the 2010–11 Liga Nacional de Fútbol de Guatemala teams

Team	Home city	Stadium	Capacity
Comunicaciones	Guatemala	Cementos Progreso	16,000
Heredia	San José	Julian Tesucun	8,000
Juventud Retalteca	Retalhuleu	Óscar Monterroso	8,000
Malacateco	Malacatán	Santa Lucía	7,000
Marquense	San Marcos	Marquesa de la Ensenada	10,000
Mictlán	Asunción Mita	La Asunción	3,000
Municipal	Guatemala	Mateo Flores	30,000
Peñarol	Huehuetenango	Los Cuchumatanes	5,340
Suchitepéquez	Mazatenango	Carlos Salazar Hijo	12,000
Universidad San Carlos	Guatemala	Revolución USAC	5,000
Xelajú	Quetzaltenango	Mario Camposeco	11,000
Xinabajul	Huehuetenango	Los Cuchumatanes	5,340

== Apertura ==
Pos	Team	Pld	W	D	L	GF	GA	GD	Pts	Qualification
1	Municipal	22	11	5	6	40	22	+18	38	Qualified to the Semifinals
2	Marquense	22	9	6	7	32	27	+5	33	Qualified to the Semifinals
3	Heredia	22	9	5	8	28	30	−2	32	Qualified to the Quarterfinals
4	Comunicaciones	22	6	13	3	26	23	+3	31	Qualified to the Quarterfinals
5	Mictlán	22	9	4	9	15	18	−3	31	Qualified to the Quarterfinals
6	Suchitepéquez	22	8	6	8	32	23	+9	30	Qualified to the Quarterfinals
7	Juventud Retalteca	22	7	9	6	28	25	+3	30	
8	Xelajú	22	9	3	10	27	29	−2	30	
9	Xinabajul	22	8	3	11	22	29	−7	27	
10	USAC	22	7	6	9	28	36	−8	27	
11	Malacateco	22	7	6	9	20	28	−8	27	
12	Peñarol	22	5	8	9	22	29	−7	23	

Updated to match(es) played on 28 November 2010. Source: Guatefutbol
Rules for classification: 1) points; 2) goal difference; 3) number of goals scored.

=== Results ===
Home \ Away	COM	HER	JUV	MAL	MAR	MIC	MUN	PEÑ	SUC	USC	XEL	XIN
Comunicaciones		4–1	1–1	1–1	2–2	1–1	1–4	1–0	1–1	2–1	1–1	3–2
Heredia	0–1		1–1	0–0	3–1	1–0	1–2	1–0	2–1	2–1	3–2	1–0
Juventud Retalteca	1–1	3–1		1–0	3–0	0–0	1–1	1–1	1–0	2–3	2–1	1–2
Malacateco	1–1	0–3	3–1		1–2	1–0	3–2	0–0	1–0	2–1	1–0	2–1
Marquense	0–0	5–1	2–0	2–1		1–0	1–0	2–2	0–0	2–3	2–1	1–0
Mictlán	1–0	2–0	1–2	1–0	1–0		1–3	1–0	1–0	1–0	0–1	1–0
Municipal	0–0	3–1	0–0	4–0	0–0	1–0		3–0	3–1	4–0	2–1	4–0
Peñarol	2–3	2–2	2–2	1–0	2–1	1–2	1–1		1–0	3–1	1–0	0–0
Suchitepéquez	0–0	1–1	0–2	0–0	4–3	4–0	3–2	2–0		7–0	2–1	4–2
Universidad San Carlos	1–1	0–0	2–1	1–1	1–1	0–0	4–1	3–1	1–1		2–0	1–0
Xelajú	1–1	2–1	2–1	3–2	2–1	1–1	1–0	2–1	0–1	2–1		3–2
Xinabajul	1–0	0–2	1–1	3–0	0–3	1–0	2–0	1–1	1–0	2–1	1–0	

Updated to match(es) played on November 28, 2010. Source: Guatefutbol (in Spanish)
Legend: Blue = home team win; Yellow = draw; Red = away team win.

=== Top scorers ===
Pos	Player	Club	Goals
1	(Guatemala) Guillermo Ramírez	Municipal (Considered the award-winner for playing less minutes)	13
1	(Colombia) Henry Hernández	Heredia	13
1	(Costa Rica) Andy Herron	USAC	13
4	(Guatemala) Mario Rodríguez	Municipal	11
5	(Brazil) Israel Silva	Xelajú	9
6	(Uruguay) Martín Crossa	Xelajú	8
6	(Brazil) Evandro Ferreira	Suchitepéquez	8
6	(Honduras) Óscar Isaula	Malacateco	8
6	(Panama) Johnny Ruiz	Marquense	8
10	(Guatemala) Jonny Brown	Marquense	7
10	(Guatemala) Orvelio Mazariegos	Peñarol	7
10	(Guatemala) Tránsito Montepeque	Comunicaciones	7

=== Playoffs ===
Quarterfinals
3	Heredia	0	3	3
6	Suchitepéquez	1	3	4
4	Comunicaciones	0	3	3
5	Mictlán	1	0	1

Semifinals
1	Municipal	3	2	5
6	Suchitepéquez	2	0	2
2	Marquense	0	2	2
4	Comunicaciones	3	3	6

Final
1	Municipal	1	2	3 (3)
4	Comunicaciones (pen.)	1	2	3 (4)

2010 Apertura winner
Comunicaciones
23rd title

== Clausura ==
Pos	Team	Pld	W	D	L	GF	GA	GD	Pts	Qualification
1	Municipal	22	11	4	7	33	20	+13	37	Qualified to the Semifinals
2	Heredia	22	11	4	7	32	19	+13	37	Qualified to the Semifinals
3	Comunicaciones	22	11	3	8	39	28	+11	36	Qualified to the Quarterfinals
4	Malacateco	22	11	3	8	32	25	+7	36	Qualified to the Quarterfinals
5	Mictlán	22	10	5	7	24	23	+1	35	Qualified to the Quarterfinals
6	Peñarol	22	10	3	9	35	36	−1	33	Qualified to the Quarterfinals
7	Juventud Retalteca	22	9	3	10	25	21	+4	30	
8	Xelajú	22	8	6	8	25	34	−9	30	
9	Marquense	22	8	5	9	28	30	−2	29	
10	USAC	22	6	8	8	22	23	−1	26	
11	Suchitepéquez	22	6	5	11	21	28	−7	23	
12	Xinabajul	22	4	5	13	11	40	−29	17	

Source: Guatefutbol
Rules for classification: 1) points; 2) goal difference; 3) number of goals scored.

=== Results ===
Home \ Away	COM	HER	JUV	MAL	MAR	MIC	MUN	PEÑ	SUC	USC	XEL	XIN
Comunicaciones		2–4	2–0	2–0	2–4	1–2	0–1	3–0	2–0	4–1	2–0	5–1
Heredia	2–0		0–0	2–0	2–1	1–1	1–0	3–1	1–0	1–1	5–0	2–0
Juventud Retalteca	1–2	1–4		0–1	3–0	2–1	0–1	2–1	1–0	2–0	4–0	3–1
Malacateco	1–3	2–0	1–0		2–1	3–1	1–0	4–1	2–1	1–0	3–0	3–0
Marquense	1–1	0–2	1–0	1–0		0–2	1–1	2–3	3–0	2–0	2–2	1–0
Mictlán	1–1	1–0	1–0	2–1	1–0		2–1	2–0	2–1	0–0	0–0	3–0
Municipal	1–2	1–0	2–1	2–2	3–1	3–0		1–0	0–0	0–1	4–0	4–0
Peñarol	3–1	4–1	1–1	2–2	3–1	2–0	2–1		2–1	4–1	1–0	2–0
Suchitepéquez	2–1	0–0	2–0	2–1	1–1	2–1	1–2	4–3		0–0	0–2	2–0
USAC	0–1	2–1	0–2	2–0	0–1	1–1	1–1	5–0	0–0		1–0	4–0
Xelajú	2–2	1–0	0–2	1–0	2–2	3–0	3–0	1–0	3–2	2–2		1–1
Xinabajul	1–0	1–0	0–0	2–2	0–2	1–0	1–4	0–0	1–0	0–0	1–2	

Source: Guatefutbol (in Spanish)
Legend: Blue = home team win; Yellow = draw; Red = away team win.

=== Top scorers ===
Pos	Player	Club	Goals
1	(Guatemala) Óscar Isaula	Malacateco	7
2	(Brazil) Guilherme de Paula	Peñarol	6
2	(Brazil) Israel Silva	Xelajú	6
4	(Guatemala) Mario Castellanos	Heredia	5
4	(Argentina) Fernando Gallo	Juventud Retalteca	5
4	(Colombia) Henry Hernández	Heredia	5
4	(Panama) Johnny Ruiz	Marquense	5
8	(Guatemala) Mario Rodríguez	Municipal	4
9	(Uruguay) Rodrigo Bengua	Mictlán	3
9	(Mexico) Carlos Kamiani Félix	USAC	3
9	(Brazil) Evandro Ferreira	Suchitepéquez	3
9	(Honduras) Darwin Oliva	Municipal	3

=== Playoffs ===
Quarterfinals
4	Malacateco	1	2	3
5	Mictlán	2	0	2
3	Comunicaciones	1	7	8
6	Peñarol	0	0	0

Semifinals
1	Municipal	0	1	1
4	Malacateco	0	0	0
2	Heredia	0	1	1
3	Comunicaciones	2	0	2

Final
1	Municipal	0	0	0
3	Comunicaciones	3	3	6

2011 Clausura winner
Comunicaciones
24th title

== Aggregate table ==
Pos	Team	Pld	W	D	L	GF	GA	GD	Pts	Qualification or relegation
1	Municipal	44	22	9	13	73	42	+31	75	Qualified to the 2011–12 CONCACAF Champions League Preliminary Round (Note: Since Comunicaciones won both championships, Municipal qualified for 2011–12 CONCACAF Champions League as the runners-up of both competitions.)
2	Heredia	44	20	9	15	60	49	+11	69	
3	Comunicaciones	44	17	16	11	65	51	+14	67	Qualified to the 2011–12 CONCACAF Champions League Group Stage
4	Mictlán	44	19	9	16	39	41	−2	66	
5	Malacateco	44	18	9	17	52	53	−1	63	
6	Marquense	44	17	11	16	60	57	+3	62	
7	Juventud Retalteca	44	16	12	16	53	46	+7	60	
8	Xelajú	44	17	9	18	52	63	−11	60	
9	Peñarol	44	15	11	18	57	65	−8	56	
10	Suchitepéquez	44	14	11	19	53	51	+2	53	
11	USAC (R)	44	13	14	17	50	59	−9	53	Relegation to the Liga de Ascenso
12	Xinabajul (R)	44	12	8	24	33	69	−36	44	Relegation to the Liga de Ascenso

Source: Guatefutbol
Rules for classification: 1) points; 2) goal difference; 3) number of goals scored.
(R) Relegated

== See also ==
- Football in Guatemala
