= 2013–14 Liga Nacional de Guatemala =

61st professional season of the top-flight football league in Guatemala

Liga Nacional de Guatemala
- Season: 2013–14
- Champions: Apertura: Comunicaciones (27th title); Clausura: Comunicaciones (28th title)
- Relegated: Mictlán; Iztapa
- Matches: 102
- Goals: 245 (2.4 per match)
- Top goalscorer: (Brazil) Israel Silva (9 goals)
- Biggest home win: Municipal 6–0 USAC (29 September); Comunicaciones 6–0 Halcones (5 October); Xelajú 6–0 Mictlán (20 October)
- Biggest away win: USAC 0–3 Heredia (10 August); Iztapa 0–3 Comunicaciones (13 October)
- Highest scoring: Heredia 4–3 Xelajú (1 September)
- Longest winning run: 5 games by: Comunicaciones (4 August - 1 September)
- Longest unbeaten run: 6 games by: Comunicaciones (5 October - 27 October)
- Longest winless run: 10 games by: Iztapa (15 September - 30 October)
- Longest losing run: 5 games by: Iztapa (10 August - 4 September)

The 2013–14 Liga Nacional de Guatemala was the 61st professional season of the top-flight football league in Guatemala. The season was divided into two championships—the 2013 Apertura and the 2014 Clausura—each in an identical format and each contested by the same 12 teams.

== Format ==
The format for both championships are identical. Each championship will have two stages: a first stage and a playoff stage. The first stage of each championship is a double round-robin format. The teams that finish first and second in the standings will advance to the playoffs semifinals, while the teams that finish 3–6 will enter in the quarterfinals. The winner of each quarterfinal will advance to the semifinals. The winners of the semifinals will advance to the finals, which will determine the tournament champion.

== Teams ==
Location of the 2013–14 Liga Nacional de Fútbol de Guatemala teams

Team	Home city	Stadium	Capacity
Coatepeque	Coatepeque	Israel Barrios	20,000
Comunicaciones	Guatemala City	Cementos Progreso	16,000
Halcones	Huehuetenango	Los Cuchumatanes	5,340
Heredia	Morales	Estadio Del Monte	8,000
Iztapa	Iztapa	Estadio Municipal Morón	3,000
Malacateco	Malacatán	Santa Lucía	7,000
Marquense	San Marcos	Marquesa de la Ensenada	10,000
Mictlán	Asunción Mita	La Asunción	3,000
Municipal	Guatemala City	Mateo Flores	30,000
Suchitepéquez	Mazatenango	Carlos Salazar Hijo	12,000
Universidad de San Carlos	Guatemala City	Estadio Revolución	5,000
Xelajú	Quetzaltenango	Mario Camposeco	11,000

== Apertura ==
The 2013 Torneo Apertura began on 4 August 2013 and will end in December 2013.

=== Standings ===
Pos	Team	Pld	W	D	L	GF	GA	GD	Pts	Qualification
1	Comunicaciones (Q)	22	14	2	6	44	15	+29	44	Qualified to the Quarterfinals
2	Municipal (Q)	22	13	5	4	37	13	+24	44	Qualified to the Quarterfinals
3	Heredia (Q)	22	10	5	7	34	25	+9	35	Qualified to the Quarterfinals
4	USAC (Q)	22	11	2	9	27	33	−6	35	Qualified to the Quarterfinals
5	Marquense (Q)	22	9	7	6	26	22	+4	34	Qualified to the Quarterfinals
6	Halcones (Q)	22	8	5	9	23	33	−10	29	Qualified to the Quarterfinals
7	Malacateco (Q)	22	7	7	8	21	25	−4	28	Qualified to the Quarterfinals
8	Suchitepéquez (Q)	22	6	9	7	28	26	+2	27	Qualified to the Quarterfinals
9	Xelajú	22	7	6	9	36	35	+1	27	
10	Mictlán	22	6	6	10	20	39	−19	24	
11	Coatepeque	22	4	7	11	21	33	−12	19	
12	Iztapa	22	3	7	12	19	37	−18	16	

Updated to match(es) played on 24 November 2013. Source: Soccerway
Rules for classification: 1) points; 2) goal difference; 3) number of goals scored.
(Q) Qualified for the phase indicated

=== Results ===
Home \ Away	COA	COM	HAL	HER	IZT	MAL	MAR	MIC	MUN	SUC	USC	XEL
Coatepeque		1–2	0–0	2–1	2–1	3–3	1–1	2–0	1–0	0–1	1–2	1–1
Comunicaciones	2–1		6–0	3–0	1–0	3–0	2–0	7–0	1–0	3–0	1–1	1–2
Halcones	3–2	1–0		1–1	1–0	2–1	1–1	3–1	2–1	0–2	1–0	1–0
Heredia	2–2	0–2	3–1		4–0	1–1	1–0	4–2	1–0	2–1	3–0	4–3
Iztapa	0–0	0–3	3–2	0–0		0–1	0–0	1–1	1–1	1–0	2–3	3–2
Malacateco	3–0	2–0	2–2	1–0	1–1		2–0	1–1	0–2	1–0	1–0	1–1
Marquense	2–0	2–1	4–1	2–1	2–0	0–0		2–0	0–0	2–1	1–0	1–0
Mictlán	1–1	0–2	2–0	2–0	2–0	3–0	1–0		0–0	1–1	0–1	1–0
Municipal	1–0	1–0	1–0	1–0	3–1	1–0	3–1	5–0		1–1	6–0	3–0
Suchitepéquez	1–0	1–1	1–1	0–0	2–2	3–0	0–0	2–2	2–3		0–2	4–1
USAC	2–0	1–3	1–0	0–3	3–1	1–0	4–2	1–0	1–3	1–3		2–1
Xelajú	4–1	2–0	1–0	1–3	3–2	1–0	3–3	6–0	1–1	2–2	1–1	

Updated to match(es) played on 24 November 2013. Source: Results
Legend: Blue = home team win; Yellow = draw; Red = away team win.

=== Playoffs ===
Quarterfinals
1	Comunicaciones	2	0	2
8	Suchitepéquez	1	0	1
4	USAC	0	1	1
5	Marquense	3	0	3
3	Heredia	0	4	4
6	Halcones	0	0	0
2	Municipal	2	2	4
7	Malacateco	2	1	3

Semifinals
1	Comunicaciones	0	4	4
5	Marquense	1	0	1
3	Heredia	3	1	4
2	Municipal	0	1	1

Finals
1	Comunicaciones	0	3	3 (4)
3	Heredia	2	1	3 (3)

==== Quarterfinals ====
===== First leg =====
27 November 2013
18:25 (UTC-6)

C.D. Suchitepéquez	1– 2	Comunicaciones
J. Hidalgo 20'	Report	J. Marquez 27'; M. López 46'

Estadio Municipal, Mazatenango
Attendance: 3,383
Referee: Oscar Reyna

28 November 2013
18:00 (UTC-6)

Marquense	3 – 0	USAC
J. Alvarez 45+1'; J. Ortíz 59'; E. Fuentes 72'	Report

Estadio Revolucion USAC, Guatemala City
Attendance: 5,077
Referee: Juan Carlos Guerra

28 November 2013
13:00 (UTC-6)

Halcones	0 – 0	Heredia
	Report

Estadio Comunal de la Mesilla, Huehuetenango
Attendance: 263
Referee: Ruben Castellanos

27 November 2013
13:00 (UTC-6)

Malacateco	2 – 2	Municipal
R. Peña 16'; A. Apellaniz 37'	Report	D. Oliva 4'; D. Oliva 34'

Estadio Municipal Santa Lucia, Malacatán
Attendance: 1,380
Referee: Ever López

===== Second leg =====
30 November 2013
16:00 (UTC-6)

Comunicaciones	0 – 0	C.D. Suchitepéquez
	Report

Estadio Cementos Progreso, Guatemala City
Attendance: 2,673
Referee: Mario Ramirez

1 December 2013
09:00 (UTC-6)

USAC	1 – 0	Marquense
J. Alvarez (OG) 45'	Report

Estadio Marquesa de la Ensenada, San Marcos
Attendance: 1,449
Referee: Jonathan Polanco

1 December 2013
11:00 (UTC-6)

Heredia	4 – 0	Halcones
O. López 43'; O. López 56'; W. Velásquez 85'; O. López 86'	Report

Estadio del Monte, Morales
Attendance: 1,200
Referee: Oswaldo Aldana

30 November 2013
13:00 (UTC-6)

Municipal	2 – 1	Malacateco
L. Monje 13'; M. Rodríguez 71'	Report	R. Porras 30'

Estadio Manuel Felipe Carrera, Guatemala City
Attendance: 3,663
Referee: Bryan López

==== Semifinals ====
===== First leg =====
4 December 2013
18:00 (UTC-6)

Marquense	1 – 0	Comunicaciones
J. Alvarez 33'	Report

Estadio Marquesa de la Ensenada, San Marcos
Attendance: 9,300
Referee: Oswaldo Aldana

5 December 2013
11:00 (UTC-6)

Heredia	3 – 0	Municipal
A. Andrade 9'; D. Espinoza 19'; N. Miranda 82'	Report

Estadio del Monte, Morales
Attendance: 1,800
Referee: Jonathan Polanco

===== Second leg =====
7 December 2013
18:00 (UTC-6)

Comunicaciones	4 – 0	Marquense
J. Paredes 27'; P. Suárez 46'; J. Arreola 73'; J. Márquez 80'	Report

Estadio Nacional Mateo Flores, Guatemala City
Attendance: 2,889
Referee: Juan Carlos Guerra

8 December 2013
09:00 (UTC-6)

Municipal	1 – 1	Heredia
M. Rodríguez 17'	Report	M. López 40'

Estadio Manuel Felipe Carerra, Guatemala City
Attendance: 3,756
Referee: Walter Lopez

==== Finals ====
===== First leg =====
12 December 2013
11:00 (UTC-6)

Heredia	2 – 0	Comunicaciones
N. Miranda 84'; A. Andrade 90+3'	Report

Estadio del Monte, Morales
Attendance: 3,400
Referee: Juan Carlos Guerra

===== Second leg =====
14 December 2013
16:00 (UTC-6)

Comunicaciones	3 – 1 4 – 3 (pen.)	Heredia
J. Contreras 64', 68'; Paolo Suárez 88'	Report	A. Andrade 26'

Estadio Cementos Progreso, Guatemala City
Attendance: 11,398
Referee: Walter Lopez

== Clausura ==
The 2014 Torneo Clausura began on 18 January 2014 and will end in May 2014.

=== Personnel and sponsoring ===
Team	Chairman	Head coach	Kitmaker	Shirt sponsor
Coatepeque	(Guatemala)	(Guatemala) Carlos Castillo	TBD	TBD
Comunicaciones	(Guatemala)	(Argentina) Iván Sopegno	Puma	TBD
Halcones	(Guatemala) TBD	(Costa Rica) Rónald Gómez	TBD	TBD
Heredia	(Guatemala)	(Argentina) Juan Carlos Elias	TBD	TBD
Iztapa	(Guatemala) TBD	(Argentina) Gustavo Reinoso	TBD	TBD
Malacateco	(Guatemala) TBD	(Costa Rica) Mauricio Wright	TBD	TBD
Marquense	(Guatemala) TBD	(Guatemala) Francisco Melgar	TBD	TBD
Mictlán	(Guatemala) TBD	(Chile) Sergio Pardo	TBD	TBD
Municipal	(Guatemala) TBD	(Uruguay) Aníbal Ruiz	TBD	TBD
Suchitepéquez	(Guatemala) TBD	(Guatemala) Walter Claverí	TBD	TBD
USAC	(Guatemala) TBD	(Argentina) Horacio Cordero	TBD	TBD
Xelajú	(Guatemala) TBD	(Guatemala) Sergio Trujillo	RetoSports	TBD

=== Standings ===
Pos	Team	Pld	W	D	L	GF	GA	GD	Pts	Qualification
1	Heredia (Q)	22	11	3	8	50	33	+17	36	Qualified to the Quarterfinals
2	Suchitepéquez (Q)	22	10	6	6	26	20	+6	36	Qualified to the Quarterfinals
3	Xelajú (Q)	22	9	7	6	33	21	+12	34	Qualified to the Quarterfinals
4	Comunicaciones (Q)	22	9	7	6	30	19	+11	34	Qualified to the Quarterfinals
5	Coatepeque (Q)	22	10	4	8	32	37	−5	34	Qualified to the Quarterfinals
6	USAC (Q)	22	9	6	7	37	26	+11	33	Qualified to the Quarterfinals
7	Municipal (Q)	22	8	7	7	22	19	+3	31	Qualified to the Quarterfinals
8	Halcones (Q)	22	8	5	9	19	31	−12	29	Qualified to the Quarterfinals
9	Mictlán	22	7	7	8	25	34	−9	28	
10	Marquense	22	6	8	8	25	35	−10	26	
11	Malacateco	22	7	4	11	24	33	−9	25	
12	Iztapa	22	3	6	13	24	39	−15	15	

Updated to match(es) played on 27 April 2014. Source: Soccerway
Rules for classification: 1) points; 2) goal difference; 3) number of goals scored.
(Q) Qualified for the phase indicated

=== Results ===
Home \ Away	COA	COM	HAL	HER	IZT	MAL	MAR	MIC	MUN	SUC	USC	XEL
Coatepeque		1–0	1–0	3–2	1–2	1–0	3–0	3–2	1–2	1–1	3–2	1–1
Comunicaciones	6–0		3–0	0–0	2–1	3–2	1–1	2–1	0–0	0–2	2–0	1–1
Halcones	1–1	1–0		3–2	0–0	2–1	0–0	1–2	1–1	1–0	0–2	2–1
Heredia	5–2	2–1	4–0		3–2	5–0	4–0	4–0	1–1	4–1	2–1	2–0
Iztapa	1–2	0–3	0–1	3–5		3–0	2–1	1–1	1–1	1–2	2–2	1–1
Malacateco	1–2	1–3	5–2	1–0	2–0		1–0	3–2	1–1	1–0	1–1	2–0
Marquense	2–1	1–1	3–0	3–1	2–1	0–0		4–2	1–1	2–4	2–0	1–3
Mictlán	1–1	3–0	0–1	1–0	1–1	2–0	1–1		1–0	0–0	2–2	2–1
Municipal	2–0	0–0	1–0	3–2	3–1	1–0	3–0	0–1		1–0	0–2	1–2
Suchitepéquez	1–0	1–2	0–0	3–1	2–1	3–1	1–1	0–0	1–0		1–0	2–1
USAC	2–3	1–0	1–3	1–1	2–0	1–1	5–0	6–0	1–0	1–0		2–1
Xelajú	3–1	0–0	3–0	4–0	2–0	1–0	0–0	3–0	2–0	1–1	2–2	

Updated to match(es) played on 27 April 2014. Source: Soccerway
Legend: Blue = home team win; Yellow = draw; Red = away team win.

=== Playoffs ===
Quarterfinals
1	Heredia	0	6	6
8	Halcones	1	1	2
2	Suchitepéquez	1	0	1
7	Municipal	4	1	5
3	Xelajú	2	2	4
6	USAC	2	0	2
4	Comunicaciones	1	1	2
5	Coatepeque	0	0	0

Semifinals
1	Heredia	1	3	4
7	Municipal (a)	1	3	4
3	Xelajú	1	0	1
4	Comunicaciones	3	1	4

Finals
7	Municipal	0	0	0
4	Comunicaciones	1	1	2

== Aggregate table ==
Pos	Team	Pld	W	D	L	GF	GA	GD	Pts	Qualification or relegation
1	Comunicaciones	44	23	9	12	74	34	+40	78	2014–15 CONCACAF Champions League
2	Municipal	44	21	12	11	59	32	+27	75	2014–15 CONCACAF Champions League
3	Heredia	44	21	8	15	84	58	+26	71	
4	USAC	44	20	8	16	64	59	+5	68	
5	Suchitepéquez	44	16	15	13	54	46	+8	63	
6	Xelajú	44	16	13	15	69	56	+13	61	
7	Marquense	44	15	15	14	51	57	−6	60	
8	Halcones	44	16	10	18	42	64	−22	58	
9	Malacateco	44	14	11	19	45	58	−13	53	
10	Coatepeque	44	14	11	19	53	70	−17	53	
11	Mictlán (R)	44	13	13	18	45	73	−28	52	Relegation to the Primera División
12	Iztapa (R)	44	6	13	25	43	76	−33	31	Relegation to the Primera División

Updated to match(es) played on 27 April 2014. Source: Soccerway
Rules for classification: 1) points; 2) goal difference; 3) number of goals scored.
(R) Relegated
