= 2012–13 Liga Nacional de Guatemala =

60th professional season of the top-flight football league in Guatemala

Liga Nacional de Guatemala
- Season: 2012–13
- Champions: Apertura: Comunicaciones (25th title); Clausura: Comunicaciones (26th title)
- Relegated: Petapa; Juventud Escuintleca
- Champions League: Comunicaciones

The 2012–13 Liga Nacional de Guatemala was the 60th professional season of the top-flight football league in Guatemala. The season was divided into two championships—the 2012 Clausura and the 2013 Clausura—each in an identical format and each contested by the same 12 teams.

== Format ==
The format for both championships are identical. Each championship will have two stages: a first stage and a playoff stage. The first stage of each championship is a double round-robin format. The teams that finishes 1 and 2 in the standings will advance to the playoffs semifinals, while the teams that finish 3–6 will enter in the quarterfinals. The winner of each quarterfinals will advance to the semifinals. The winners of the semifinals will advance to the finals, which will determine the tournament champion.

== Teams ==
for
Location of the 2012–13 Liga Nacional de Fútbol de Guatemala teams

Team	Home city	Stadium	Capacity
Comunicaciones	Guatemala City	Cementos Progreso	16,000
Escuintleca	Escuintla	Estadio Armando Barillas	3,000
Heredia	San José	Julián Tesucún	8,000
Malacateco	Malacatán	Santa Lucía	7,000
Marquense	San Marcos	Marquesa de la Ensenada	10,000
Mictlán	Asunción Mita	La Asunción	3,000
Municipal	Guatemala City	Mateo Flores	30,000
Peñarol	Huehuetenango	Los Cuchumatanes	5,340
Petapa	San Miguel Petapa	Municipal	7,500
Suchitepéquez	Mazatenango	Carlos Salazar Hijo	12,000
USAC	Guatemala City	Estadio Revolución	5,000
Xelajú	Quetzaltenango	Mario Camposeco	11,000

Penarol La Mesilla changed their names to Halcones FC for this season.

== Apertura ==
The 2012 Torneo Apertura began on 15 July 2012 and ends in December 2012.

=== Standings ===
Pos	Team	Pld	W	D	L	GF	GA	GD	Pts	Qualification
1	Comunicaciones	22	15	5	2	39	16	+23	50	Qualified to the Quarterfinals
2	Municipal	22	11	8	3	46	23	+23	41	Qualified to the Quarterfinals
3	Xelajú	22	11	3	8	34	29	+5	36	Qualified to the Quarterfinals
4	Heredia	22	10	5	7	33	24	+9	35	Qualified to the Quarterfinals
5	Peñarol	22	9	6	7	30	24	+6	33	Qualified to the Quarterfinals
6	Malacateco	22	7	7	8	26	25	+1	28	Qualified to the Quarterfinals
7	Suchitepéquez	22	7	7	8	36	40	−4	28	Qualified to the Quarterfinals
8	Marquense	22	6	8	8	24	27	−3	26	Qualified to the Quarterfinals
9	Petapa	22	7	3	12	27	43	−16	24	
10	Mictlán	22	6	4	12	22	40	−18	22	
11	USAC	22	5	6	11	33	39	−6	21	
12	Juventud Escuintleca	22	5	4	13	23	43	−20	19	

Updated to match(es) played on 25 November 2012. Source: Standings
Rules for classification: 1) points; 2) goal difference; 3) number of goals scored.

=== Results ===
Home \ Away	COM	PET	HER	ESC	MAL	MAR	MIC	MUN	PEÑ	SUC	USC	XEL
Comunicaciones		1–0	3–0	5–0	1–1	2–0	2–1	1–0	0–0	4–0	2–0	2–0
Petapa	3–3		3–1	2–1	0–3	1–1	3–0	1–2	2–0	2–0	2–1	4–1
Heredia	1–0	4–1		3–0	2–0	4–0	2–0	2–2	3–0	2–1	2–1	2–0
Juventud Escuintleca	1–2	3–0	1–1		0–0	2–1	3–0	0–4	2–2	2–1	2–0	1–2
Malacateco	1–2	5–0	1–1	2–0		0–0	1–0	1–1	2–1	1–1	1–1	2–1
Marquense	2–2	1–1	2–1	1–0	2–0		1–0	2–3	2–0	1–1	3–1	2–3
Mictlán	0–1	3–1	2–0	2–1	1–0	1–0		1–1	0–1	1–1	3–1	1–3
Municipal	1–1	3–0	0–0	5–1	1–0	1–1	6–2		0–0	6–1	4–4	2–0
Peñarol	1–1	4–1	2–0	3–0	4–1	1–0	0–0	2–0		2–2	3–1	1–0
Suchitepéquez	4–1	2–0	2–0	4–2	1–4	0–0	3–3	1–3	3–1		4–1	2–1
Universidad de San Carlos	0–1	2–0	2–2	1–1	4–0	1–1	7–0	0–1	1–0	2–1		2–0
Xelajú	1–2	2–0	1–0	2–0	1–1	2–1	2–1	2–0	3–2	1–1	4–0	

Updated to match(es) played on 29 July 2012. Source: Results
Legend: Blue = home team win; Yellow = draw; Red = away team win.

=== Playoffs ===
Quarterfinals
1	Comunicaciones	2	3	5
8	Marquense	2	0	2
3	Xelajú	0	3	3
6	Malacateco	5	0	5
4	Heredia	1	5	6
5	Peñarol	3	1	4
2	Municipal	1	3	4
7	Suchitepéquez	1	3	4

Semifinals
1	Comunicaciones	0	2	2
6	Malacateco	0	1	1
4	Heredia	1	2	3
2	Municipal	1	3	4

Finals
1	Comunicaciones	3	1	4
2	Municipal	0	0	0

- Comunicaciones qualified for 2013–14 CONCACAF Champions League.

== Clausura ==
=== Standings ===
Pos	Team	Pld	W	D	L	GF	GA	GD	Pts	Qualification
1	Comunicaciones	22	13	5	4	30	14	+16	44	Qualified to the Quarterfinals
2	Heredia	22	11	6	5	44	25	+19	39	Qualified to the Quarterfinals
3	Malacateco	22	11	5	6	24	18	+6	38	Qualified to the Quarterfinals
4	Suchitepéquez	22	10	3	9	31	30	+1	33	Qualified to the Quarterfinals
5	Halcones	22	10	3	9	29	28	+1	33	Qualified to the Quarterfinals
6	Marquense	22	10	2	10	37	26	+11	32	Qualified to the Quarterfinals
7	USAC	22	9	3	10	28	32	−4	30	Qualified to the Quarterfinals
8	Xelajú	22	9	3	10	26	31	−5	30	Qualified to the Quarterfinals
9	Mictlán	22	8	5	9	23	30	−7	29	
10	Petapa	22	6	6	10	21	31	−10	24	
11	Municipal	22	5	5	12	19	27	−8	20	
12	Juventud Escuintleca	22	6	2	14	18	38	−20	20	

Updated to match(es) played on 2 June 2013. Source: Standings
Rules for classification: 1) points; 2) goal difference; 3) number of goals scored.

=== Results ===
Home \ Away	COM	PET	HER	JUV	MAL	MAR	MIC	MUN	HAL	SUC	USC	XEL
Comunicaciones		1–0	1–0	2–0	1–1	0–0	1–0	2–0	2–0	0–2	2–0	1–0
Petapa	1–0		1–0	3–1	2–0	2–1	1–1	1–2	0–0	1–1	1–2	3–0
Heredia	3–3	3–0		2–0	2–0	2–1	1–1	1–0	5–0	4–2	2–0	5–0
Juventud Escuintleca	0–3	3–1	2–0		0–1	2–0	1–1	1–0	0–1	1–0	2–1	0–0
Malacateco	2–1	0–0	2–0	5–0		1–0	2–0	1–0	1–0	2–1	2–0	0–0
Marquense	0–1	4–1	3–4	3–1	4–1		5–1	0–0	3–1	2–0	1–0	4–0
Mictlán	0–2	3–0	1–1	2–1	2–1	1–0		1–1	3–0	1–0	1–0	2–0
Municipal	0–1	0–0	1–3	2–1	0–0	0–1	4–0		3–2	3–2	1–3	0–1
Halcones	0–0	3–1	1–1	4–0	2–0	3–1	2–0	2–0		2–0	1–0	3–1
Suchitepéquez	0–2	2–0	2–2	2–1	3–1	1–0	2–1	1–1	3–0		2–1	2–0
USAC	4–3	2–2	2–2	2–0	0–0	3–2	3–1	2–1	1–0	0–2		2–0
Xelajú	1–1	2–0	2–1	3–1	0–1	1–2	2–0	1–0	3–2	5–1	4–0	

Updated to match(es) played on July 2012. Source:
Legend: Blue = home team win; Yellow = draw; Red = away team win.

=== Playoffs ===
Quarterfinals
1	Comunicaciones	2	2	4
8	Xelajú	1	1	2
3	Malacateco	0	3	3
6	Marquense	2	3	5
4	Suchitepéquez	1	1	2
5	Halcones FC	3	1	4
2	Heredia	1	2	3
7	Universidad San Carlos	2	0	2

Semifinals
1	Comunicaciones	1	2	3
6	Marquense	1	1	2
5	Halcones FC	2	1	3
2	Heredia	0	4	4

Finals
1	Comunicaciones	2	0	2
2	Heredia	1	0	1

== Aggregate table ==
Pos	Team	Pld	W	D	L	GF	GA	GD	Pts	Qualification or relegation
1	Comunicaciones	44	28	10	6	69	30	+39	94	Qualification for 2013–14 CONCACAF Champions League Group Stage
2	Heredia	44	21	11	12	77	49	+28	74	
3	Malacateco	44	18	12	14	51	43	+8	66	
4	Peñarol La Mesilla/Halcones FC	44	19	9	16	58	52	+6	66	
5	Xelajú	44	20	6	18	60	61	−1	66	
6	Municipal	44	16	13	15	65	50	+15	61	
7	Suchitepéquez	44	17	10	17	67	70	−3	61	
8	Marquense	44	16	10	18	61	53	+8	58	
9	USAC	44	14	9	21	61	70	−9	51	
10	Mictlán	44	14	9	21	45	70	−25	51	
11	Petapa (R)	44	13	9	22	48	74	−26	48	Relegation to the Primera División
12	Juventud Escuintleca (R)	44	11	6	27	41	81	−40	39	Relegation to the Primera División

Updated to match(es) played on June 2013. Source: Guatefutbol
Rules for classification: 1) points; 2) goal difference; 3) number of goals scored.
(R) Relegated
