= Sergio Pardo =

Chilean footballer and manager (born 1948)

Personal information
- Full name: Sergio Enrique Pardo Valenzuela
- Date of birth: 24 February 1948 (age 78)
- Place of birth: Santiago, Chile
- Position: Attacking midfielder

Youth career
- Juventud San Rafael

Senior career*
Years	Team	Apps	(Gls)
- Colo-Colo
- Deportes Ovalle
- Lister Rossel
- Naval
- Aurora FC
- Deportivo Zacapa
- CD Santiagueño
- Universidad SC
- Juventud Retalteca
- Deportivo Pensamiento

Managerial career
- 1984–1986: Tipografía Nacional
- Dely Soccer
- 1996: Deportivo Amatitlán
- Deportivo Azucareros
- Xelajú
- CSD Sacachispas
- CD Ipala
- Real Verdes
- Sanarate FC
- Deportivo Jocotán
- Deportivo San Benito
- 2008–2009: Deportivo Zacapa
- Universidad SC
- EMEFUT (youth)
- 2009: Peñarol La Mesilla
- Deportivo Coatepeque
- 2010–2011: Heredia
- 2012: Deportivo Zacapa
- 2012–2013: Deportivo Mictlán
- 2013: Guatemala
- 2014–2015: Deportivo Mixco
- 2015: Deportivo Coatepeque
- 2015–2016: Deportivo Jocotán
- 2016–2017: Deportivo Marquense
- 2017: Deportivo Carchá
- 2018: Deportivo Marquense
- 2019: Deportivo Achuapa
- 2019–2020: Universidad SC
- 2021: Deportivo Achuapa
- * Club domestic league appearances and goals

Sergio Enrique Pardo Valenzuela (born 24 February 1948) is a Chilean football manager and former footballer who played as an attacking midfielder.

== Playing career ==
As a child Pardo was with Juventud San Rafael, then he joined Colo-Colo where he coincided with successful players such as Manuel Loco Araya and Leonel Herrera and made his professional debut in a match against O'Higgins at the age of 18. In Chile he also played for Deportes Ovalle, Lister Rossel and Naval.

After the 1973 Chilean coup d'état, he moved to Guatemala and played for Aurora FC, Deportivo Zacapa, Universidad SC, Juventud Retalteca and Deportivo Pensamiento, what was his last club. He won the titles of both the first and the second level of the Guatemalan football league system along with Aurora FC (1975) and Deportivo Pensamiento (1980), respectively. He also had a stint with CD Santiagueño in El Salvador.

== Coaching career ==
Pardo has had an extensive career, mainly in Guatemala. He made his debut coaching Tipografía Nacional from 1984 to 1986. After a brief stint with Dely, a soccer team from the United States, he returned to Guatemala in 1996 to coach Deportivo Amatitlán, with whom he won the Copa de Guatemala.

In Guatemala, he has coached important clubs such as Xelajú, CSD Sacachispas, Deportivo Coatepeque, Deportivo Zacapa, Universidad SC, Heredia, among others. He has reached better seasons along with Deportivo Zacapa and Heredia,

As an anecdote, he has coached some Chilean players in the Guatemalan football such as Claudio Chavarría, Fabián Muñoz and Héctor Suazo.

He also had a stint with Belizean club Real Verdes.

In 2019, he retired from the activity due to the fact that he suffered a heart attack while he worked for Deportivo Achuapa. After being operated on, he joined Universidad SC. In 2021, he returned to Deportivo Achuapa.

=== National team ===
In August 2013, he assumed as manager of the Guatemala national team for the friendly match against Japan on 6 September of the same year.

== Personal life ==
Pardo is known by his nickname Chico Pardo (Little Pardo).

He married Verónica Ordóñez, daughter of the former president of Deportivo Zacapa, David Alfonso Ordóñez Bardales, and has five children.

After his first experience as manager of Tipografía Nacional, he worked as a sport teacher for different departments of Armed Forces of Guatemala and for Julio Verne School. In the United States, he also worked for a bakery and as a stone seller.

== Honours ==
=== Player ===
Aurora FC

- Liga Nacional de Fútbol: 1975

Deportivo Pensamiento

- Liga Mayor B: 1980

=== Manager ===
Deportivo Amatitlán

- Copa de Guatemala: 1996
