= Santiago López (footballer, born 1982) =

Uruguayan footballer

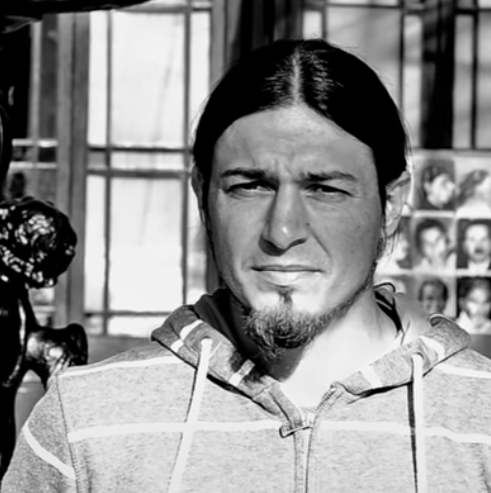

Personal information
- Full name: Santiago Tabaré López Bruzzese
- Date of birth: 8 May 1982 (age 44)
- Place of birth: Montevideo, Uruguay
- Height: 1.76 m (5 ft 9 1/2 in)
- Position: Forward

Team information
- Current team: Villa Española
- Number: 8

Youth career
- Rocha
- Bella Vista
- 2000–2003: Villa Española

Senior career*
| Years | Team | Apps | (Gls) |
| 2003–2004 | Villa Española | | |
| 2005–2006 | Rentistas | 26 | (1) |
| 2007 | Tacuarembó | 4 | (0) |
| 2008 | Villa Española | | |
| 2008–2009 | Montevideo Wanderers | 24 | (6) |
| 2010 | Juventud | 8 | (2) |
| 2010–2011 | Bella Vista | 27 | (5) |
| 2011–2012 | Suchitepéquez | 21 | (6) |
| 2012 | Rentistas | 12 | (2) |
| 2012–2013 | Municipal | 32 | (3) |
| 2013–2016 | Villa Española | 59 | (24) |
| 2018– | Villa Española | 67 | (28) |
- * Club domestic league appearances and goals as of 19:24, 2 September 2021 (UTC)

Santiago Tabaré López Bruzzese (born 8 May 1982) is a Uruguayan professional footballer who plays as a forward for Villa Española.

== Career ==
López had youth spells with Rocha and Bella Vista, before joining Villa Española in 2000. His senior footballing career started in 2003 with Villa Española. In 2005, López joined Rentistas of the Uruguayan Primera División. He scored one goal in twenty-six appearances during the 2005–06 season. 2007 saw him have a short spell with Tacuarembó, prior to a return to Villa Española in 2008. A year later, López signed for Primera División team Montevideo Wanderers. He remained for two seasons, scoring six goals in twenty-four games; including his first against Racing Club on 7 February 2009.

Between 2010 and 2011, López spent time with Juventud (Segunda División) and Bella Vista (Primera División). On 21 June 2011, López left Uruguayan football to join Guatemala's Suchitepéquez. He made his Liga Nacional debut on 10 July versus Marquense, before scoring his first goal two matches later against Heredia on 24 July. In total, he played twenty-three times for Suchitepéquez and netted seven goals. He rejoined Rentistas in 2012, months before securing a return to Guatemala with Municipal. His first goal for Municipal came on 28 October 2012 versus former club Suchitepéquez.

Thirty-two appearances and three goals followed for López with Municipal. In September 2013, Villa Española resigned López. He scored twenty-one goals in his first two seasons back, which led to promotion to the 2016 Uruguayan Primera División. Villa Española were relegated at the conclusion of 2016, López subsequently retired after the club didn't renew his contract. In February 2018, López came out of retirement to play for Villa Española in the 2018 Uruguayan Segunda División. He scored two goals on his fourth official debut for the club on 5 March versus Sud América.

== Career statistics ==
As of 5 September 2018.

Club statistics
| Club | Season | League | | | Cup | | League Cup | | Continental (Note: Includes the CONCACAF Champions League) | | Other | | Total | |
| Club | Season | Division | Apps | Goals | Apps | Goals | Apps | Goals | Apps | Goals | Apps | Goals | Apps | Goals |
|---|---|---|---|---|---|---|---|---|---|---|---|---|---|---|
| Rentistas | 2005–06 | Primera División | 26 | 1 | — | | — | | — | | 0 | 0 | 26 | 1 |
| Tacuarembó | 2006–07 | Segunda División | 4 | 0 | — | | — | | — | | 0 | 0 | 4 | 0 |
| Montevideo Wanderers | 2008–09 | Primera División | 14 | 5 | — | | — | | — | | 0 | 0 | 14 | 5 |
| Montevideo Wanderers | 2009–10 | Primera División | 10 | 1 | — | | — | | — | | 0 | 0 | 10 | 1 |
| Montevideo Wanderers | Total | | 24 | 6 | — | | — | | — | | 0 | 0 | 24 | 6 |
| Juventud | 2009–10 | Segunda División | 8 | 2 | — | | — | | — | | 0 | 0 | 8 | 2 |
| Bella Vista | 2010–11 | Primera División | 27 | 5 | — | | — | | — | | 0 | 0 | 27 | 5 |
| Suchitepéquez | 2011–12 | Liga Nacional | 21 | 6 | — | | — | | — | | 2 (Note: Two appearances in 2011–12 Liga Nacional play-offs) | 1 (Note: One goal in 2011–12 Liga Nacional play-offs) | 23 | 7 |
| Rentistas | 2011–12 | Primera División | 12 | 2 | — | | — | | — | | 0 | 0 | 12 | 2 |
| Municipal | 2012–13 | Liga Nacional | 26 | 2 | — | | — | | 2 (Note: Two appearances in 2012–13 CONCACAF Champions League) | 0 | 6 (Note: Six appearances in 2012–13 Liga Nacional play-offs) | 1 (Note: One goal in 2012–13 Liga Nacional play-offs) | 34 | 3 |
| Villa Española | 2014–15 | Segunda División | 25 | 14 | — | | — | | — | | 0 | 0 | 25 | 14 |
| Villa Española | 2015–16 | Segunda División | 20 | 7 | — | | — | | — | | 0 | 0 | 20 | 7 |
| Villa Española | 2016 | Primera División | 14 | 3 | — | | — | | — | | 0 | 0 | 14 | 3 |
| Villa Española | 2018 | Segunda División | 13 | 6 | — | | — | | — | | 0 | 0 | 13 | 6 |
| Villa Española | Total | | 72 | 30 | — | | — | | — | | 0 | 0 | 72 | 30 |
| Career total | | | 220 | 54 | — | | — | | 2 | 0 | 8 | 2 | 230 | 56 |
