= Jairo Pérez (footballer) =

Guatemalan footballer (born 1976)

Personal information
- Full name: Jairo Miguel Pérez Morrison
- Date of birth: 10 June 1976 (age 50)
- Place of birth: Guatemala City, Guatemala
- Position: Central defender

Senior career*
Years	Team	Apps	(Gls)
2002–2005	Deportivo Marquense		
2005–2009	Deportivo Petapa		
2009–2011	Juventud Retalteca		

International career
1999–2000	Guatemala	7	(0)
- * Club domestic league appearances and goals

Jairo Miguel Pérez Morrison (born 10 June 1976) is a Guatemalan former footballer who played as a central defender.

== Career ==
Born in Guatemala City, Pérez played for Deportivo Marquense, Deportivo Petapa and Juventud Retalteca.

He made seven international appearances for Guatemala, between 1999 and 2000.
