= Adolfo Machado =

Panamanian footballer (born 1985)

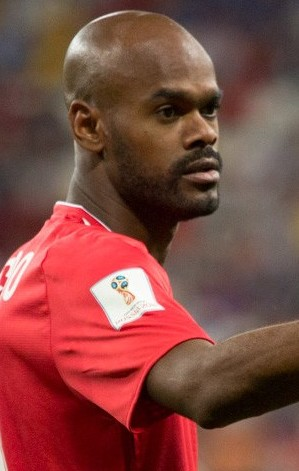
- Machado with Panama at the 2018 FIFA World Cup

Personal information
- Full name: Adolfo Abdiel Machado
- Date of birth: 14 February 1985 (age 41)
- Place of birth: Panama City, Panama
- Height: 1.82 m (6 ft 0 in)
- Position: Central defender

Team information
- Current team: Alianza
- Number: 31

Youth career
- 2004: Alianza

Senior career*
Years	Team	Apps	(Gls)
2004–2010	Alianza	90	(6)
2009	→ Marquense (loan)	38	(2)
2010	Marathón	15	(0)
2011–2012	Comunicaciones	24	(0)
2013–2014	San Francisco	0	(0)
2014	→ Saprissa (loan)	42	(1)
2014–2016	Saprissa	71	(0)
2017–2018	Houston Dynamo	54	(0)
2019	The Strongest	10	(0)
2019	ADR Jicaral	14	(0)
2020	Alajuelense	43	(1)
2021	San Carlos	33	(0)
2022	Sporting San Miguelito	22	(1)
2023	C.D. Árabe Unido	10	(0)
2024	Alianza	9	(0)

International career^{‡}
2007–2008	Panama U-23	7	(0)
2008–2021	Panama	92	(2)
- * Club domestic league appearances and goals as of 30 July 2021 ‡ National team caps and goals as of 21 July 2021

Adolfo Abdiel Machado (born 14 February 1985) is a Panamanian professional footballer who plays as a defender for LPF club Alianza.

== Club career ==
Around July 2008 Machado travelled to Colombia to play with Copa Mustang side Envigado along with U-23 teammate Armando Cooper. However the transfer failed and had to return to Panama to continue with Alianza. In December 2008 he was signed by Guatemalan side Deportivo Marquense. In May 2010 he joined Honduran side Marathón and in December 2010 Machado moved to Guatemalan top club Comunicaciones. He would help Comunicaciones win the 2011 Clausura.

=== Doping case and suspension ===
In February 2012, Machado, alongside Comunicaciones teammates Fredy Thompson and Marvin Ceballos, was temporarily suspended from playing by FIFA after a positive test on the banned substance boldenone. A second test done at a laboratory in Canada reconfirmed the positive doping test and he was later suspended for two years, until 24 January 2014. Conunicaciones would win the 2012 Apertura and 2013 Clausura in his absence.

Before his ban ended, he signed with San Francisco in November 2013 ahead of the 2014 Clausura season but in December 2013, Machado was loaned to Costa Rican giants Saprissa for two seasons with an option to extend and debuted on the first day after his doping ban was lifted. Machado would help lead Saprissa to 4 titles in his time there and received many personal accolades.

On 21 December 2016, Machado signed with the Houston Dynamo of MLS. He made his Dynamo debut on 4 March 2017 in a 2–1 over Seattle Sounders FC. He helped the Dynamo return to the MLS playoffs for the first time since 2013 Machado played in every minute of the playoffs as the Dynamo reached the western conference finals, where they fell to the Sounders.

The Dynamo didn't have the same league success in the 2018, in part due to Machado missing key games while away on international duty, but he did help the Dynamo win the 2018 US Open Cup, the first in club history.

Machado's contract was not renewed following the 2018 season; he later joined The Strongest.

== International career ==
Machado participated in the 2008 CONCACAF Men's Pre-Olympic Tournament with the Panama U-23 team. He made his debut with the senior team on 1 June 2008 starting in the 1–0 victory over Guatemala. He has, as of 16 October 2018, earned a total of 77 caps, scoring 1 goal. He represented his country at the 2009, 2011 and 2014 UNCAF Nations Cups, with Panama winning the 2009 edition, as well as at the 2011 CONCACAF Gold Cup.

In May 2018 he was named to Panama's preliminary 35-man squad for the 2018 FIFA World Cup in Russia. The 23-man roster was announced on 30 May with Machado being a part of it. He made his one appearance at the World Cup on 28 June in a 1–2 loss to Tunisia.

== Career statistics ==
=== International ===
As of 03 July 2021

Panama
Year	Apps	Goals
2008	5	0
2009	4	1
2010	9	0
2011	16	0
2012	0	0
2013	0	0
2014	7	0
2015	15	0
2016	11	0
2017	5	0
2018	7	0
2019	1	1
2020	1	0
2021	4	0
Total	85	2

=== International goals ===
Scores and results list Panama's goal tally first.

#	Date	Venue	Opponent	Score	Result	Competition
1	19 June 2009	Stade Sylvio Cator, Port-au-Prince, Haiti	Haiti	1–1	1–1	Friendly
2	23 March 2019	Estádio do Dragão, Porto, Portugal	Brazil	1–1	1–1	Friendly

== Honors ==
Comunicaciones F.C.

- Liga Nacional de Fútbol de Guatemala: 2011 Clausura

Saprissa

- Liga FPD: Clausura 2014, Apertura 2014, Apertura 2015, Apertura 2016

Houston Dynamo

- US Open Cup: 2018

Alajuelense

- Liga FPD: Apertura 2020
- CONCACAF League: 2020

Panama

- Copa Centroamericana: 2009
- CONCACAF Gold Cup third place: 2015

Individual

- Rommel Fernández Award (given to best Panamanian footballer abroad): 2014
- Liga FPD Player of the Season: 2014
- Liga FPD Foreign Player of the Season: 2014–15, 2015 Invierno, 2016 Verano, Invierno 2016
- Dynamo defender of the year: 2017

== See also ==
- List of sportspeople sanctioned for doping offences
