= Dwight Pezzarossi =

Guatemalan footballer (born 1979)

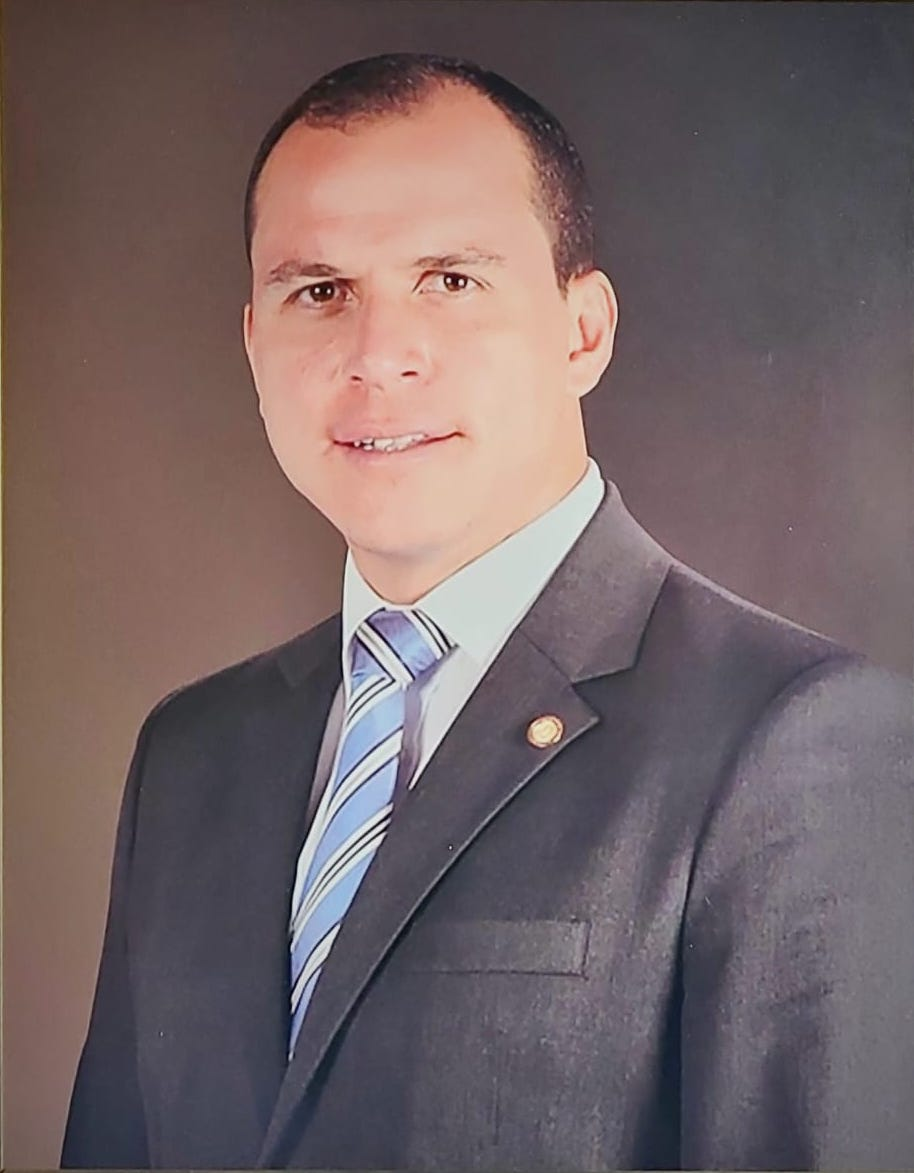
- Official portrait as Minister of Culture and Sports.

Minister of Culture and Sports
- In office 18 September 2014 – 18 September 2015
- President: Otto Pérez Molina; Alejandro Maldonado
- Preceded by: Carlos Batzín
- Succeeded by: Ana María Rodas

Personal details
- Born: 4 September 1979 (age 47) Guatemala City, Guatemala
- Height: 1.87 m (6 ft 2 in)
Association football career
- Position: Forward
Team information
- Current team: Municipal (assistant)
Youth career
- Deportivo Escuintla
Senior career*
Years	Team	Apps	(Gls)
1996–2000	Comunicaciones		
2000–2001	Argentinos Juniors	7	(0)
2001	Palestino	23	(13)
2002	Santiago Wanderers	8	(4)
2002–2003	Racing de Ferrol	36	(8)
2003–2004	Comunicaciones	29	(12)
2004	Bolton Wanderers	0	(0)
2004–2005	Comunicaciones	35	(9)
2005–2006	Racing de Ferrol	11	(3)
2006–2007	Numancia	1	(0)
2007–2008	Marquense	21	(9)
2008–2011	Comunicaciones	27	(16)
2011–2012	Deportes La Serena	30	(7)
2012–2013	Comunicaciones	37	(5)
International career
2000–2012	Guatemala	72	(16)
Managerial career
- 2020: Aurora (assistant)
- 2021: Santa Lucía (assistant)
- 2022–2023: Antigua (assistant)
- 2023–2024: Antigua
- 2024–2025: Guastatoya
- 2025–: Municipal (assistant)
- * Club domestic league appearances and goals

Dwight Anthony Pezzarossi García (born 4 September 1979) is a Guatemalan former professional football forward and manager. On 18 September 2014, Pezzarossi was named Minister of Culture and Sports of Guatemala.

Target man Pezzarossi, nicknamed El Tanque ("the Tank", due to his size), started his footballing career with Guatemalan lower division club Deportivo Escuintla. He spent one year there before signing for a club in the top Guatemalan league, Comunicaciones.

In 2000, Pezzarossi was signed by Argentinos Juniors and he became one of the few Guatemalan players to play abroad. Then, in June 2001, Pezzarossi moved to Chilean side Palestino.

== Club career ==
Pezzarossi was born in Guatemala City, Guatemala. In 2003, he became the third Guatemalan footballer ever to sign with a Spanish club, joining Racing de Ferrol. He has played for a number of different clubs in different countries including Argentinos Juniors of Argentina, Palestino and Santiago Wanderers of Chile, and Bolton Wanderers of England. He played for Racing de Ferrol again in 2006, before being transferred to Numancia. He could not claim a regular place there and joined Deportivo Marquense in 2007.

In 2008, while playing for Marquense, he had a trial with Italian Serie B side Pisa Calcio.

=== La Serena ===
During the 2011 Copa América break, it was reported that Pezzarossi would join to Chilean Primera División side Deportes La Serena in a season deal. On 27 June, Pezzarossi arrived to Chile and then he joined to La Serena in a one-year contract. He debuted for La Serena in a 3–0 away loss against Universidad de Chile, playing only 23 minutes in the game after of replace to his teammate Juan Sánchez Sotelo. The following match, Pezzarossi scored in the 2–0 win of La Serena to Universidad de Concepción in the 88th minute, after an impressive header.

His good performance in La Serena made that Pezzarossi was recalled to the national team for the 2014 FIFA World Cup qualification match against Saint Vincent and the Grenadines, in where he scored in a 3–0 win of his country. After of his international participation, he scored for La Serena in a 2–0 win to Santiago Wanderers, a historic triumph of his team after 20 years of footballing paterny over La Serena at Valparaíso. His third goal for the club came against Unión Española in a dramatic 3–2 win, in where the keeper Marcos Gutiérrez saved the team of the draw, after of save a penalty to Leonardo Monje.

== International career ==
Pezzarossi made his debut for Guatemala in a January 2000 friendly match against Panama and played his last match in 2012, he has earned a total of 72 caps, scoring 16 goals. He has represented the Guatemalan team in four FIFA World Cup qualification campaigns of 2002, 2006, 2010 and 2014 . He remarkably only played two games at the CONCACAF Gold Cup, coming on as a substitute against El Salvador in 2007 and again as a substitute against Grenada in 2011.

== Career statistics ==
Scores and results list Guatemala's goal tally first, score column indicates score after each Pezzarossi goal.

List of international goals scored by Dwight Pezzarossi
No.	Date	Venue	Opponent	Score	Result	Competition
1	3 July 2000	Montreal, Canada	Haiti	4–1	4–1	Friendly
2	15 August 2000	Estadio Alejandro Morera Soto, Alajuela, Costa Rica	Costa Rica	1–2	1–2	2002 FIFA World Cup qualification
3	1 June 2001	Estadio Tiburcio Carías Andino, Tegucigalpa, Honduras	Costa Rica	2–0	1–0	UNCAF Nations Cup 2001
4	3 June 2001	Estadio Olímpico Metropolitano, San Pedro Sula, Honduras	Panama	3–1	1–0	UNCAF Nations Cup 2001
5	1 May 2004	Estadio Mateo Flores, Guatemala City, Guatemala	Panama	1–2	1–2	Friendly
6	20 June 2004	Estadio Mateo Flores, Guatemala City, Guatemala	Suriname	2–0	3–1	2006 FIFA World Cup qualification
7	8 September 2004	Estadio Olímpico Metropolitano, San Pedro Sula, Honduras	Honduras	2–0	2–2	2006 FIFA World Cup qualification
8	26 March 2005	Estadio Mateo Flores, Guatemala City, Guatemala	Trinidad and Tobago	4–1	5–1	2006 FIFA World Cup qualification
9	26 March 2005	Estadio Mateo Flores, Guatemala City, Guatemala	Trinidad and Tobago	5–1	5–1	2006 FIFA World Cup qualification
10	7 October 2006	Lockhart Stadium, Fort Lauderdale, United States	Honduras	1–0	2–3	Friendly
11	6 August 2008	RFK Memorial Stadium, Washington, United States	Bolivia	1–0	3–0	Friendly
12	11 February 2009	Estadio Monumental de Maturín, Maturín, Venezuela	Venezuela	1–0	1–2	Friendly
13	9 October 2010	Estadio Julián Tesucún, San Jose, Peten, Guatemala	Belize	3–2	4–2	Friendly
14	7 October 2011	Arnos Vale Stadium, Kingstown, Saint Vincent and the Grenadines	Saint Vincent and the Grenadines	3–0	3–0	2014 FIFA World Cup qualification
15	8 June 2012	Independence Park, Kingston, Jamaica	Jamaica	1–2	1–2	2014 FIFA World Cup qualification
16	7 September 2012	Estadio Mateo Flores, Guatemala City, Guatemala	Antigua and Barbuda	3–1	3–1	2014 FIFA World Cup qualification
