= Juan José Castillo =

Juan José Castillo may refer to:

- Juan José Castillo (footballer, born 1955), Spanish footballer
- Juan José Castillo (footballer, born 1980), Guatemalan footballer

== See also ==
- Juan José Castilla (born 1945), Mexican pentathlete
