= Henry Hernández (Colombian footballer) =

Colombian footballer (born 1982)

Personal information
- Full name: Henry Javier Hernández Álvarez
- Date of birth: 14 May 1982 (age 44)
- Place of birth: Montería, Colombia
- Height: 1.75 m (5 ft 9 in)
- Position: Forward

Team information
- Current team: Deportes Quindío

Senior career*
Years	Team	Apps	(Gls)
2000–2006	Atlético Bucaramanga	?	(18)
2007	Vida	?	(0)
2008–2009	Envigado	15	(1)
2008–2009	→ Real Santander (loan)	?	(1)
2009–2010	Juventud Retalteca	35	(20)
2010–2012	Heredia	83	(61)
2012–2013	Cúcuta Deportivo	34	(15)
2013–2014	La Equidad	34	(7)
2015	Deportivo Pasto	4	(0)
2015	Boyacá Chicó	15	(3)
2018	Chimaltenango FC	26	(30)
2019–	Deportes Quindío	37	(12)
- * Club domestic league appearances and goals as of 19:34, 8 June 2020 (UTC)

Henry Javier Hernández (born 14 May 1982) is a Colombian professional footballer who plays as a forward for Deportes Quindío.

== Career ==
In 2012, he was ranked by IFFHS as the third top goalscorer of the year behind Lionel Messi and Cristiano Ronaldo, scoring 35 goals in 45 matches with Guatemalan club Heredia.
