= Julián Tesucún Stadium =

Stadium in San José, Guatemala

Coordinates: 16°58′55″N 89°54′14″W

Estadio Julián Tesucún
- Interactive map of Estadio Julián Tesucún
- Full name: Estadio Julián Tesucún
- Location: San José, Guatemala
- Owner: Municipality of San José
- Capacity: 8,000
- Surface: Grass
- Field size: 104 m × 68 m (341 ft × 223 ft)

Construction
- Opened: 9 March 2008; 18 years ago
- Cost: Q4.6 million

Tenant
- C.D. Heredia

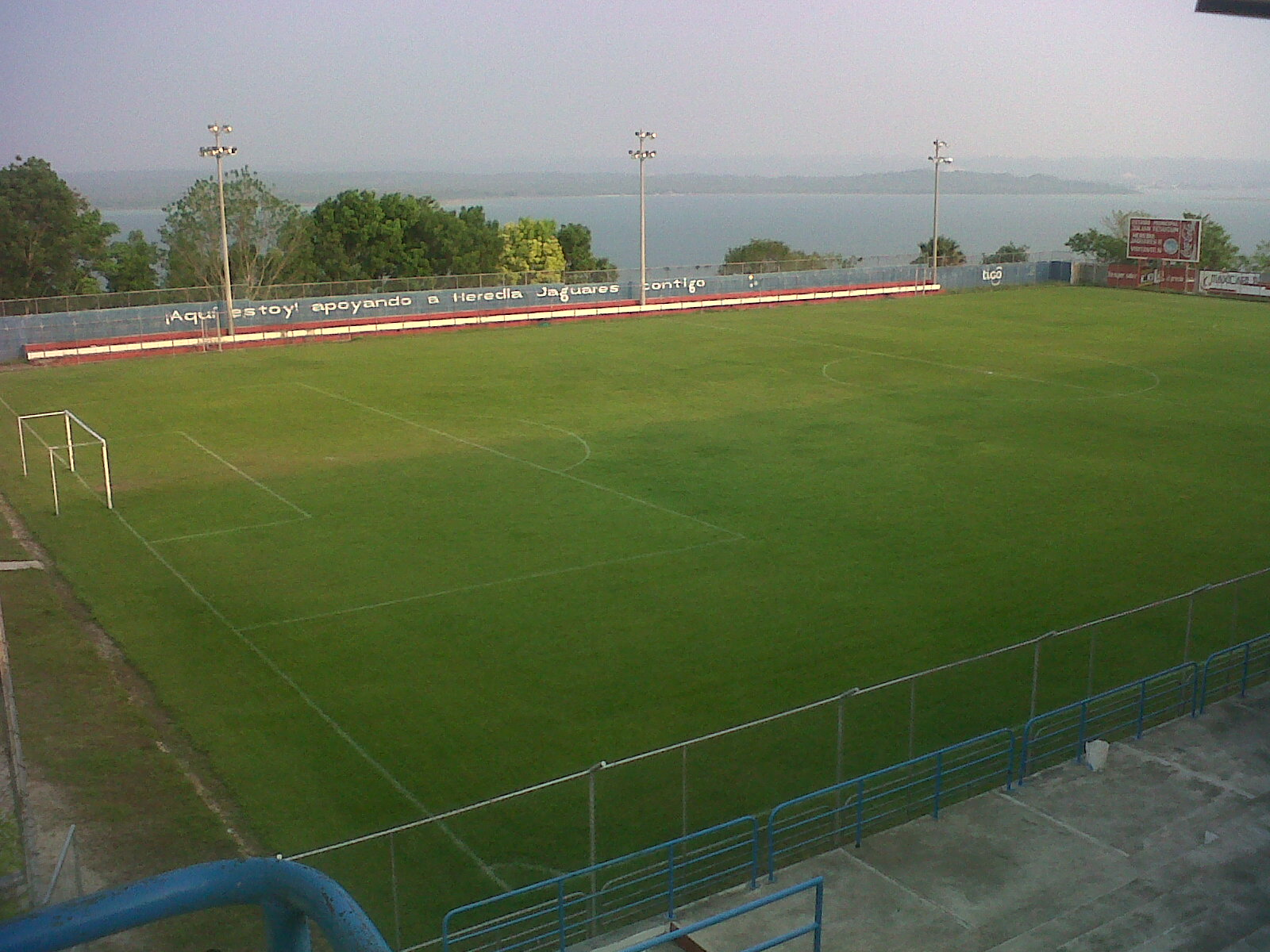
Estadio Julián Tesucún

Julián Tesucún Stadium (Spanish: Estadio Julián Tesucún) is a multi-use stadium in San José, Guatemala. It is currently used mostly for football matches, on club level by C.D. Heredia of the Liga Nacional de Fútbol de Guatemala. The stadium has a capacity of 8,000 spectators.

== See also ==
- Lists of stadiums
