= Juan José Castillo (footballer, born 1980) =

Guatemalan footballer

Personal information
- Full name: Juan José Castillo Colindres
- Date of birth: 12 October 1980 (age 46)
- Place of birth: Guatemala
- Height: 1.80 m (5 ft 11 in)
- Positions: Midfielder; forward

Team information
- Current team: CSD Municipal
- Number: 20

Senior career*
Years	Team	Apps	(Gls)
- Deportivo Heredia
2007–2009	C.D. Jalapa		
2009–present	CSD Municipal		

International career^{‡}
2010	Guatemala		
- * Club domestic league appearances and goals as of 1 August 2010 ‡ National team caps and goals as of 1 August 2010

Juan José Castillo Colindres (born 12 October 1980) is a Guatemalan football midfielder or forward who plays for local club CSD Municipal in the Guatemala's top division.

== Club career ==
Castillo helped C.D. Jalapa reach their only Guatemalan championship by scoring two goals against Municipal in the 2009 Clausura final.

The next season, Municipal brought him on and won the 2009 Apertura title with Castillo on the bench in favor of Carlos Figueroa.

Castillo eventually won the starting spot in the 2010 Clausura. In the knockout stage, he scored two goals against USAC late when Municipal was down 3–0 in the first leg. Municipal went on to win 4–3 on aggregate with a 2–0 win at home.

He managed to score once in each leg of Municipal's 7–2 rout over Club Xelajú MC in the final, giving him his third consecutive title with two clubs.
