= Morales, Guatemala =

Morales
- Municipality

- Location in Guatemala
- Coordinates: 15°28′21″N 88°50′29″W
- Country: Guatemala
- Department: Izabal Department
- Municipality: Morales
- Creation municipality: 1920-06-24

Government
  - Mayor (2016-2020): Francisco Cappa Rosales

Area
  - Municipality: 1,408 km^{2} (544 sq mi)
- Elevation: 75 m (246 ft)

Population (census 2018)
  - Municipality: 100,361
  - Density: 71/km^{2} (180/sq mi)
  - Urban: 23,855
- Climate: Af

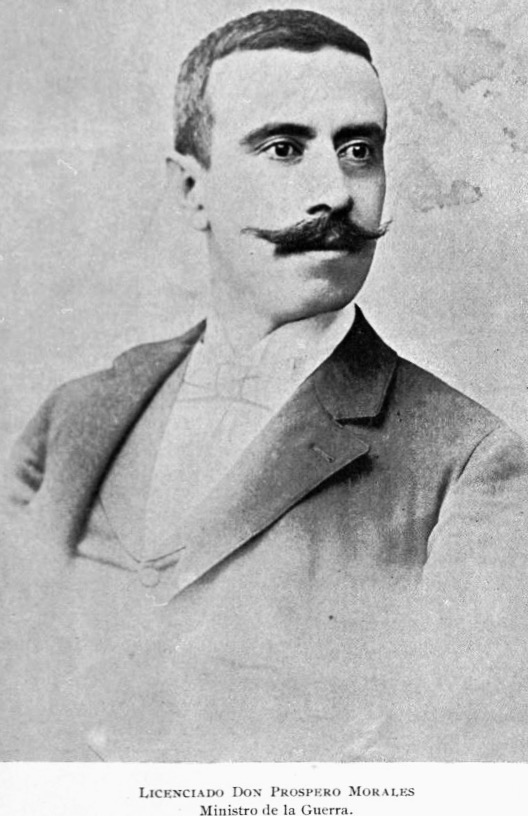
Lawyer and colonel Próspero Morales, after whom the municipality was named. He was secretary of War and Economy for president José María Reina Barrios.

Morales is a municipality in Izabal Department of Guatemala. The municipality was created in 1920 and is formed by the town of Morales, 9 villages and 56 rural communities. The Cuevas del Silvino National Park is located a few kilometers northeast of Morales.

== Northern Railroad of Guatemala ==
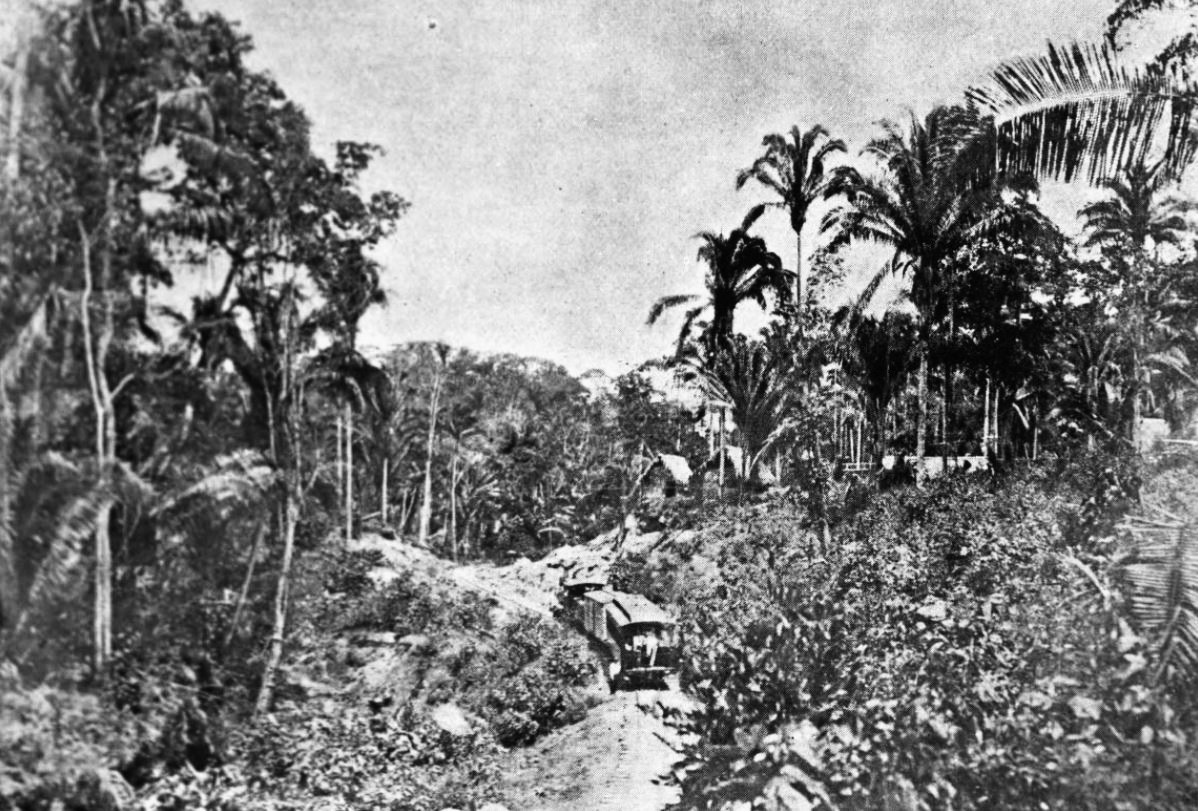
Railways through the jungle in Izabal Department in 1896. Photographs by La Ilustración Guatemalteca.

On 22 November 1896 the Northern Railroad Zacapa, Zacapa-Puerto Barrios connection, was opened to the public; it was the most important infrastructure project of general José María Reina Barrios given the economic crisis that loomed over Guatemala if he was not able to finish the railroad on time for the Central American Expo scheduled for March 1897. The new line had a length of 163 kilometers (101 mi). In those days, the Northern region of Guatemala was practically a new and unexplored area, a newfound place where natural resources could be exploited and the railroad construction finally gave way to the commercial and industrial exploration of the area. The complete line Puerto Barrios-Guatemala City -through Panajax- had 317 kilometers (197 mi) and was built in stages (which later became train stops): from Puerto Barrios to Tenedores -in Morales-, 29 km (18 mi); from Tenedores to Los Amates, 66 km (41 mi); from Los Amates to Gualán, 34 km (21 mi); from Zacapa to El Rancho de San Agustín, 55 km (34 mi); from El Rancho to Panajax, 48 km (30 mi); and finally, from Panajax to Guatemala city, 51 km (32 mi).

== United Fruit Company ==
In early 1920, after the Unionist party deposed Manuel Estrada Cabrera, the United Fruit Company -which had received considerable concessions from the Guatemalan president in the past two decades in Izabal- was suddenly confronted with a large strike and did not have the help from the government to repress it due to the fighting taking place in Guatemala City. New labor chapters opened both in Morales and Los Amates banana plantations, while Puerto Barrios had more than 250 members. The strike grew stronger and upon the resistance of the Unionists to help it, UFCO supported a coup d'état led by general José María Orellana in 1921, who swiftly repressed the union members and gave tranquility to the United Fruit Company operations in Izabal.

== Franja Transversal del Norte ==
In the 1960s, the importance of the region known as Franja Transversal del Norte was in livestock, exploitation of precious export wood and archaeological wealth. Timber contracts we granted to multinational companies such as Murphy Pacific Corporation from California, which invested US$30 million for the colonization of southern Petén and Alta Verapaz, and formed the North Impulsadora Company. Colonization of the area was made through a process by which inhospitable areas of the Franja Transversal del Norte (FTN) were granted to native peasants.

In 1964, the National Institute for Agrarian Transformation (INTA) defined the geography of the FTN as the northern part of the departments of Huehuetenango, Quiché, Alta Verapaz and Izabal and that same year priests of the Maryknoll order and the Order of the Sacred Heart began the first process of colonization, along with INTA, carrying settlers from Huehuetenango to the Ixcán sector in Quiché.

The Northern Transversal Strip was officially created during the government of General Carlos Arana Osorio in 1970, by Decree 60-70 in the Congress, for agricultural development. The area included within the municipalities: San Ana Huista, San Antonio Huista, Nentón, Jacaltenango, San Mateo Ixtatán, and Santa Cruz Barillas in Huehuetenango; Chajul and San Miguel Uspantán in Quiché; Cobán, Chisec, San Pedro Carchá, Lanquín, Senahú, Cahabón and Chahal, in Alta Verapaz and the entire department of Izabal.

== Sports ==
The town boasted a Guatemalan top division football side in Deportivo Heredia before it was relocated to San José, El Petén Department in summer 2008 due to a lack of support.

== Climate ==
Morales has a tropical rainforest climate (Köppen: Af) and its municipal capital is 48 m above sea level.

Climate data for Morales
Month	Jan	Feb	Mar	Apr	May	Jun	Jul	Aug	Sep	Oct	Nov	Dec	Year
Mean daily maximum °C (°F)	27.5 (81.5)	29.0 (84.2)	31.3 (88.3)	32.7 (90.9)	33.0 (91.4)	32.6 (90.7)	31.4 (88.5)	31.9 (89.4)	32.1 (89.8)	30.7 (87.3)	28.4 (83.1)	27.7 (81.9)	30.7 (87.3)
Daily mean °C (°F)	23.7 (74.7)	24.4 (75.9)	26.2 (79.2)	27.5 (81.5)	28.2 (82.8)	28.1 (82.6)	27.4 (81.3)	27.6 (81.7)	27.8 (82.0)	26.6 (79.9)	24.8 (76.6)	24.0 (75.2)	26.4 (79.5)
Mean daily minimum °C (°F)	19.9 (67.8)	19.8 (67.6)	21.1 (70.0)	22.3 (72.1)	23.4 (74.1)	23.7 (74.7)	23.5 (74.3)	23.4 (74.1)	23.5 (74.3)	22.5 (72.5)	21.3 (70.3)	20.3 (68.5)	22.1 (71.7)
Average precipitation mm (inches)	157 (6.2)	81 (3.2)	75 (3.0)	72 (2.8)	137 (5.4)	276 (10.9)	309 (12.2)	254 (10.0)	303 (11.9)	244 (9.6)	231 (9.1)	187 (7.4)	2,326 (91.7)
Source: Climate-Data.org

== See also ==
- United Fruit Company
