= Tránsito Montepeque =

Guatemalan footballer

Personal information
- Full name: Tránsito Eduardo Montepeque Linares
- Date of birth: December 16, 1980 (age 45)
- Place of birth: Sipacate, Guatemala
- Height: 1.75 m (5 ft 9 in)
- Position: Forward

Senior career*
Years	Team	Apps	(Gls)
2004–2005	Cobán Imperial		
2005	Xelajú MC		
2006–2015	Comunicaciones		

International career
2004–2011	Guatemala	19	(5)
- * Club domestic league appearances and goals

Tránsito Montepeque (born 16 December 1980) is a Guatemalan former professional footballer who played as a forward.

== Club career ==
Montepeque made his top division debut for Coban Imperial when he was 23 years old, but he immediately scored a winning extra-time goal which won the club a historic first (and only) league title. He then moved to Comunicaciones where his playing time has, so far, been limited due to the presence of the Costa Rican striker Rolando Fonseca and the Guatemalan national team player Dwight Pezzarossi. With the departure of both Fonseca and Pezzarossi, Montepeque has been a prominent striker for the club.

On 1 October 2011 Montepeque scored the fastest goal since the Apertura and Clausura tournament format was introduced in 1999. He netted the first goal of a 3-1 win for Comunicaciones against Heredia 9 seconds into the match.

== International career ==
Montepeque made his debut for Guatemala in a July 2004 friendly match against El Salvador and has, as of January 2010, earned a total of 19 caps, scoring 5 goals. He has so far only represented his country in friendly matches.

== Personal life ==
Tránsito has a younger cousin named Jean Carlos Montepeque who also plays for Comunicaciones as a defender.

== Career statistics ==
Scores and results list. Guatemala's goal tally first.

#	Date	Venue	Opponent	Score	Result	Competition
1	22 August 2007	Estadio Rommel Fernández, Panama City, Panama	Panama	1-0	1-2	Friendly match
2	4 September 2010	Lockhart Stadium, Fort Lauderdale, USA	Nicaragua	1-0	5-0	Friendly match
3	4 September 2010	Lockhart Stadium, Fort Lauderdale, USA	Nicaragua	5-0	5-0	Friendly match
4	7 September 2010	Robert F. Kennedy Memorial Stadium, Washington, D.C., USA	El Salvador	2-0	2-0	Friendly match
5	17 November 2010	Kennesaw State University Soccer Stadium, Marietta, USA	Guyana	1-0	3-0	Friendly match
