= David Ordoñez Bardales Stadium =

Stadium in Zacapa, Guatemala

Coordinates: 14°58′01″N 89°31′37″W

Estadio David Ordoñez Bardales
- Interactive map of Estadio David Ordoñez Bardales
- Former names: Estadio Valentín del Cid
- Location: Zacapa, Guatemala
- Owner: Municipality of Zacapa
- Capacity: 8,500
- Surface: Grass
- Field size: 104 m × 68 m (341 ft × 223 ft)

Construction
- Opened: 1952

Tenant
- CSD Zacapa (1952–2024)

The David Alfonso Ordóñez Bardales Stadium (Spanish: Estadio David Ordoñez Bardales) is a football stadium located in Zacapa, Guatemala. It was home to Liga Nacional club Zacapa (Los Gallos). It has a capacity of 8,500 spectators. The stadium was named on former Mayor of Zacapa, David Ordóñez Bardales. It opened in 1952 and it was formerly known as Estadio Valentín del Cid.

== See also ==
- Lists of stadiums
