= CSD Zacapa =

Association football club in Guatemala

Zacapa
- Full name: Club Social y Deportivo Zacapa
- Nicknames: Los Gallos (The Roosters); Los Super Gallos (The Super Roosters); Zacapanecos (supporters)
- Founded: 14 November 1951; 73 years ago
- Dissolved: 5 January 2025; 10 months ago
- Ground: Estadio David Ordoñez Bardales
- Capacity: 8,100
- Chairman: Danilo Moscoso
- Manager: Rafael Díaz
- League: Liga Nacional
- Apertura 2024: 12th
Home colours	Away colours

Club Social y Deportivo Zacapa was a Guatemalan professional football club from Zacapa. They were nicknamed "Los Gallos" (The Roosters). They competed in the Liga Nacional, the first tier of Guatemalan football. The team played its home games at the Estadio David Ordoñez Bardales, the local stadium.

== History ==
The club was founded on November 14, 1951 as Municipal of Zacapa by founder David Alfonso Ordoñez Bardales. The team won its promotion to the National League in 1959, it also participated in the 1960 Guatemala Cup. The club has had ups and downs during its career in the League, since it had several relegations to the first division on 5 occasions. They also managed to reach the Cup Tournament final in 2009 but lost it to Comunicaciones by an overall score of 5–1.

Their colors consists of red and yellow stripes paired with black shorts and main mascot is inspired of a rooster.

Their rivals are Cobán Imperial, which is known as the Clásico del Norte.

Due to financial difficulties and poor results in games Zacapa withdrew from the League on January 5th 2025.

== Stadium ==
The official venue of the club is the Estadio David Ordoñez Bardales, named after their founder, that is located in the city of Zacapa in eastern Guatemala. It is known as El Gallinero by the nickname given to the club. It has a capacity to accommodate 8,100 spectators.

== Honours ==
=== Domestic honours ===
==== Leagues ====
- Primera División de Ascenso
  - Champions (1): Clausura 2023
    - Semifinales Liga Nacional Apertura 2023-2024

== Current squad ==
Note: Flags indicate national team as defined under FIFA eligibility rules; some limited exceptions apply. Players may hold more than one non-FIFA nationality.

No.	Pos.	Nation	Player
2	DF	GUA	Francisco Lopez
3	DF	ARG	Ariel Siliman
4	DF	CRC	Jaikel Medina
5	MF	GUA	Edgar Macal
6	DF	CRC	Jean Carlo Agüero
7	FW	GUA	Luis Martínez (captain)
8	MF	GUA	Benedicto Aldana
9	FW	GUA	Gerson Tinoco
10	MF	ARG	Tomás Pizzaro
12	MF	GUA	Enrique Klug
14	FW	GUA	Demcy Guzmán
15	DF	GUA	César Madrid

No.	Pos.	Nation	Player
16	MF	GUA	Durban Reyes
17	FW	VEN	Jose Barragán
18	GK	ARG	Eduardo Flores
19	MF	GUA	Bryan Ordóñez
20	FW	GUA	Emilio Garcia
21	MF	GUA	Rodrigo Coito
22	GK	GUA	Daniel Morales
23	FW	GUA	Luis Herminio Pérez
25	FW	GUA	Víctor Paz
26	DF	GUA	Otto Tatuaca
32	DF	GUA	Edgar Méndez
76	FW	GUA	Milton Buenafé
77	MF	GUA	Brayam Castañeda (on loan from Comunicaciones)
