= Darwin Oliva =

Honduran-Guatemalan footballer (born 1989)

Personal information
- Full name: Darwin Eusebio Oliva García
- Date of birth: 21 March 1989 (age 37)
- Place of birth: La Ceiba, Honduras
- Height: 1.74 m (5 ft 9 in)
- Position: Striker

Youth career
- CD Cruz Azul

Senior career*
Years	Team	Apps	(Gls)
- Deportes Savio
2010–2017	Municipal	202	(38)
2017	Petapa	21	(3)
2017	Sanarate	3	(0)
2017	Vida		
2019	Santa Lucía Cotzumalguapa		

International career^{‡}
2005	Honduras U17	5	(1)
- Honduras U20
2013	Honduras		
- * Club domestic league appearances and goals as of 2009-05-18 ‡ National team caps and goals as of 2009-03-08

Darwin Eusebio Oliva García (born 21 March 1989) is a Honduran-Guatemalan retired footballer.

== Club career ==
A forward, he was born in Honduras but gained Guatemalan citizenship in 2010. With Municipal, he helped the team capture the 2009–2010 Clausura title, scoring a goal in the second leg of the final against Xelajú MC.

Team	Season	Games	Start	Sub	Goal	YC	RC
Deportes Savio	2008–09 A	0	0	0	0	0	0
