= Atlético Mictlán =

Association football club in Guatemala

- Full name: Club Atlético Mictlán
- Nickname: Los Conejos (The Rabbits)
- Founded: 1960; 66 years ago
- Ground: Estadio La Asunción
- Capacity: 8,000
- Chairman: Erlin Armando Palma
- Manager: Flavio da Silva
- League: Liga Guate
- Clausura 2024: Group B 6th (Knockout Phase)
Home colours	Away colours

Club Atlético Mictlán (Spanish pronunciation: [klˈub atlˈetiko miktlˈan]) is a professional football club that currently competes in Liga Guate, the top division of Guatemalan football.

Nicknamed Los Conejos (the Rabbits) and are based in Asunción Mita, Jutiapa. Their home stadium is Estadio La Asunción, which holds a capacity of 4,000.

== History ==
Mictlán was promoted for the first time in 1992 when they bought the license that Galcasa from Villa Nueva left in the top division. In 2006 Mictlán achieved their second promotion to the Liga Nacional when they defeated Xinabajul in Primera División de Ascenso extra match, playing the 2006–07 season in Liga Nacional for the first time since 1996. They would be back in the Second Division soon again after finishing last in the overall standings, thus being automatically demoted and stay there through the 2009–10 season.

The team returned to Guatemala's top division for the 2010 Clausura tournament after defeating Sacachispas 1–0 in overtime.

== Players ==
=== Current squad ===
Note: Flags indicate national team as defined under FIFA eligibility rules; some limited exceptions apply. Players may hold more than one non-FIFA nationality.

No.	Pos.	Nation	Player
1	GK	URU	John Faust
2	DF	GUA	Diego Cuque
3	DF	GUA	Jonas Herrarte
4	DF	PAR	Pablo Meza
5	DF	GUA	Bryan Menéndez
6	MF	COL	Juan Osorio
7	MF	GUA	Kendel Herrarte
9	FW	COL	Sebastian Colón
10	MF	COL	Daniel Santa
11	FW	GUA	Christopher Martínez
16	MF	GUA	Elder Tobar
17	MF	GUA	Mario Grijalva
18	FW	PAR	Julio Rodríguez
19	MF	GUA	Osman Salguero

No.	Pos.	Nation	Player
22	DF	GUA	José Sánchez
23	GK	GUA	Junior Figueroa
24	MF	GUA	Justin Racancoj
26	DF	GUA	Juan Escobar
28	MF	GUA	Elmer Monroy
29	FW	GUA	William Fajardo
30	DF	ECU	Renny Folleco
31	MF	GUA	Brandon Rivas
44	DF	GUA	William Ramírez
77	FW	GUA	Miguel Lemus
80	MF	URU	Guillermo Chavasco
88	FW	GUA	César Chinchilla
97	FW	GUA	Emilio Korich
99	FW	GUA	Robin Betancourth

== Personnel ==
=== Coaching staff ===
As of June 2025

Position	Staff
Coach	(Guatemala) TBD (*)
Assistant manager	(Guatemala) TBD (*)
Reserve manager	(Guatemala) TBD (*)
Goalkeeper Coach	(Guatemala) TBD (*)
Under 17 Manager	(Guatemala) TBD (*)
Under 15 Manager	(Guatemala) TBD (*)
Sporting director	(Guatemala) TBD (*)
Fitness Coach	(Guatemala) TBD (*)
Team Doctor	(Guatemala) TBD (*)
Fitness Coach	(Guatemala) TBD (*)
Physiotherapy	(Guatemala) TBD (*)
Utility	(Guatemala) TBD (*)

== Board of directors ==
As of June 25, 2010

Position	Name
President	Erlin Armando Palma
Deputy President	Armando Brindis
Deputy President	Manuel Armando Rodríguez
Deputy President	Rubén Arturo Rodríguez
Secretary	Álvaro Tobar
Treasurer	Fredy Corado

== Club Statistics and Records ==
- Biggest win achieved: 6–1 to Juventud Retalteca (1993–94 League).
- Embedded biggest win: 6–1 from Comunicaciones (1994–95 League).
- Best League position: 3rd. (1995)
- Top scorer: Rudy Rolando Ramírez (18 goals)

== List of coaches ==
- (Chile) Sergio Enrique Pardo
- (Costa Rica) Jhonny Chávez (November 2013 - )
- (Guatemala) Edwin Vásquez (-June 2025)
- (Mexico) Adrian García Arias (June 2025 - September 2025)
- (Brazil) Flavio da Silva (September 2025 - February 2026)
- (Argentina) Gabriel Alvarez (February 2026 - May 2026)
