= C.D. Petapa =

Association football club in Guatemala

Petapa
- Full name: Club Deportivo Petapa
- Nicknames: Los Loros ("The Parrots"); Los Periquitos ("The Little Parakeets")
- Founded: 16 October 1979; 46 years ago
- Dissolved: 3 July 2021; 4 years ago
- Ground: Estadio Julio Armando Cobar
- Capacity: 7,500
Home colours	Away colours

Club Deportivo Petapa was a Guatemalan professional football club based in San Miguel Petapa, which last played in the Primera División de Ascenso. Their home stadium was Estadio Julio Armando Cobar, which has been converted to artificial turf due to the heavy rains that frequently hit the region.

== History ==
Founded in 1979, Sport Club Petapa Velásquez were named after a significant sportsman of the municipality. They clinched their first promotion to Guatemala's top division in 2001 and their second in 2005.

== List of coaches ==
- Gustavo Faral (2000–2001)
- (Guatemala) Juan Alberto Salguero (2008–2009)
- (Guatemala) Héctor Tatuaca (? – Nov 2011)
- (Guatemala) Irwing Olivares (November 2011- Dec 2011)
- (Argentina) Ramiro Cepeda (December 2011 – May 2012)
- (Paraguay) Cristóbal Maldonado (May 2012 – September 2012)
- (Argentina) Carlos Ruiz (September 2012 – March 2013)
- (Argentina) Pablo Centrone (March 2013 – May 2016)
- (Argentina) Ramiro Cepeda (May 2016-May 2018)
- (Mexico) Rafael Loredo (May 2018 – )
