= Mario Camposeco Stadium =

Stadium in Quetzaltenango, Guatemala

Mario Camposeco
- Mítico "Mythical"; Coloso de Hielo "Ice Colossus"
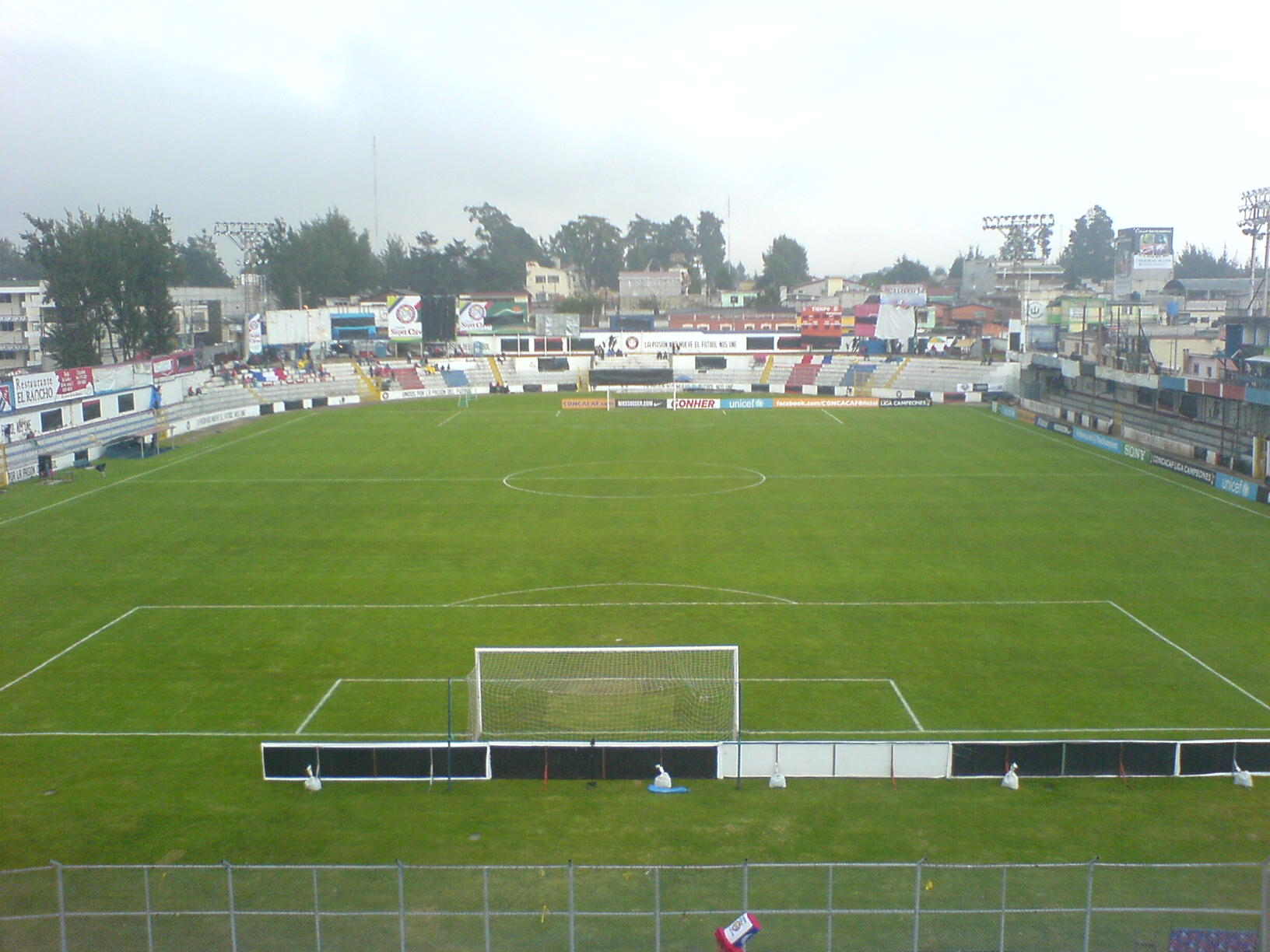
- Interactive map of Mario Camposeco
- Full name: Estadio Mario Camposeco
- Former names: Estadio Escolar (1950–1951)
- Location: Quetzaltenango, Guatemala
- Coordinates: 14°50′31″N 91°31′02″W
- Owner: Quetzaltenango municipality
- Capacity: 21,000 (expected) List: 11,226 (1950–2026)
- Surface: Grass
- Scoreboard: electronic
- Field size: 104 m × 68 m (341 ft × 223 ft)

Construction
- Built: 1948
- Opened: September 8, 1950
- Renovated: 1999, 2025–present
- Expanded: 2005, 2025–present
- Cost: 83,219.98 Quetzales. ($83,219.98)

Tenants
- CSD Xelajú MC (1950–present); Guatemala national football team (selected matches)

The Mario Camposeco Stadium (Spanish: Estadio Mario Camposeco) is a football stadium located in Quetzaltenango, Guatemala. It is the home to Liga Bantrab club Xelajú (Los Chivos). It has a capacity of 11,220.

== Location ==
The Mario Camposeco stadium is located at 14th Avenue and First Street in Zone 3.

== History ==
The stadium opened on September 8 of 1950 as a venue dedicated to students, with the name Estadio Escolar. In 1951 it was renamed to Estadio Escolar Mario Camposeco in memory of local athlete Mario Camposeco, who had died in a plane crash the year before while still active and who played football for Xelajú MC and the Guatemala national team. The stadium hosted the second leg of the 2012 Clausura championship final between Xelajú and CSD Municipal, won by the home team.

== Modifications and approval for international matches ==
In 2000 it was approved by FIFA to host World Cup qualification matches. The Guatemala national team played its first official game at the stadium on 22 July 2000 against Barbados during the semifinal round of the 2002 World Cup qualifying. In 2012 it was approved by CONCACAF to host the CONCACAF Champions League matches.

== Concerts ==
Besides football, in Mario Camposeco can be held many other events, particularly concerts. The singers to have performed at the stadium are:

- Tigres del Norte,
- Marco Antonio Solís,
- K-Paz de la Sierra
- Vicente Fernández
- Marcos Witt,

and others.

== See also ==
- Lists of stadiums
