= Halcones FC =

Association football club in Guatemala

Halcones
- Full name: Halcones Fútbol Club
- Nicknames: Los Halcones (The Falcons); Los Fronterizos (The Borderers)
- Founded: 16 June 2007; 18 years ago (as Peñarol La Mesilla)
- Dissolved: 12 June 2016; 9 years ago
- Ground: Estadio Comunal de La Mesilla
- Capacity: 5,000
| Home colours | Away colours |

Halcones Fútbol Club was a Guatemalan professional football club based in La Mesilla.

They competed in the Liga Nacional, the top division in the nation, and played their home matches at the Estadio Comunal de La Mesilla.

The club was founded as Peñarol La Mesilla in 2007, however in 2012–13 season the club changed their name to Halcones FC.
