= Juventud Retalteca =

Association football club in Guatemala

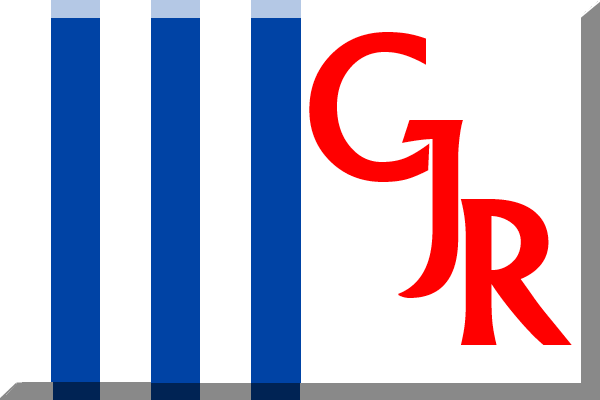
- Full name: Club Social y Deportivo Juventud Realteca
- Nicknames: El Equipo del pueblo Algodoneros
- Founded: 1951
- Ground: Estadio Dr. Óscar Monterroso Izaguirre, Retalhuleu, Guatemala
- Capacity: 8,000
- Manager: Rubén Alonso
- League: Liga Nacional de Guatemala
- Clausura 2010: 5th (playoffs) Promoted
- Website: https://web.archive.org/web/20100104104217/http://asojuventudretalteca.com/

Club Juventud Retaltecos is a Guatemalan professional football club based in Retalhuleu is in south-west Guatemala who competed in the Liga Nacional, the nation's top footballing division.

== History ==
Nicknamed Los Algodoneros (the Cotton pickers), the club was founded on 6 May 1951 by José Maria Olivar and Guillermo Gordillo. The club won promotion to Liga Mayor in 2009 after spending years in the Primera División de Ascenso and defeated national champions C.D. Jalapa 5–0 in the season's opener on August 1, 2009.

In February 2012, a car accident in which midfielder Daniel Linares died left the team in shock.

They were dissolved in 2012 after surmountable financial problems.

== Stadium ==
They play their home games at the Estadio Dr. Óscar Monterroso Izaguirre.

== Honours ==
Copa de Guatemala: 2

1980, 1985

== Coaches ==
- Gregorio Bundio
- Manuel de Jesús Castañeda
- Daniel Casas
- Carlos García Cantarero (2010)
- Manuel Castañeda (2011–)
- Mauro Oliveira
