= San José, Petén =

San José
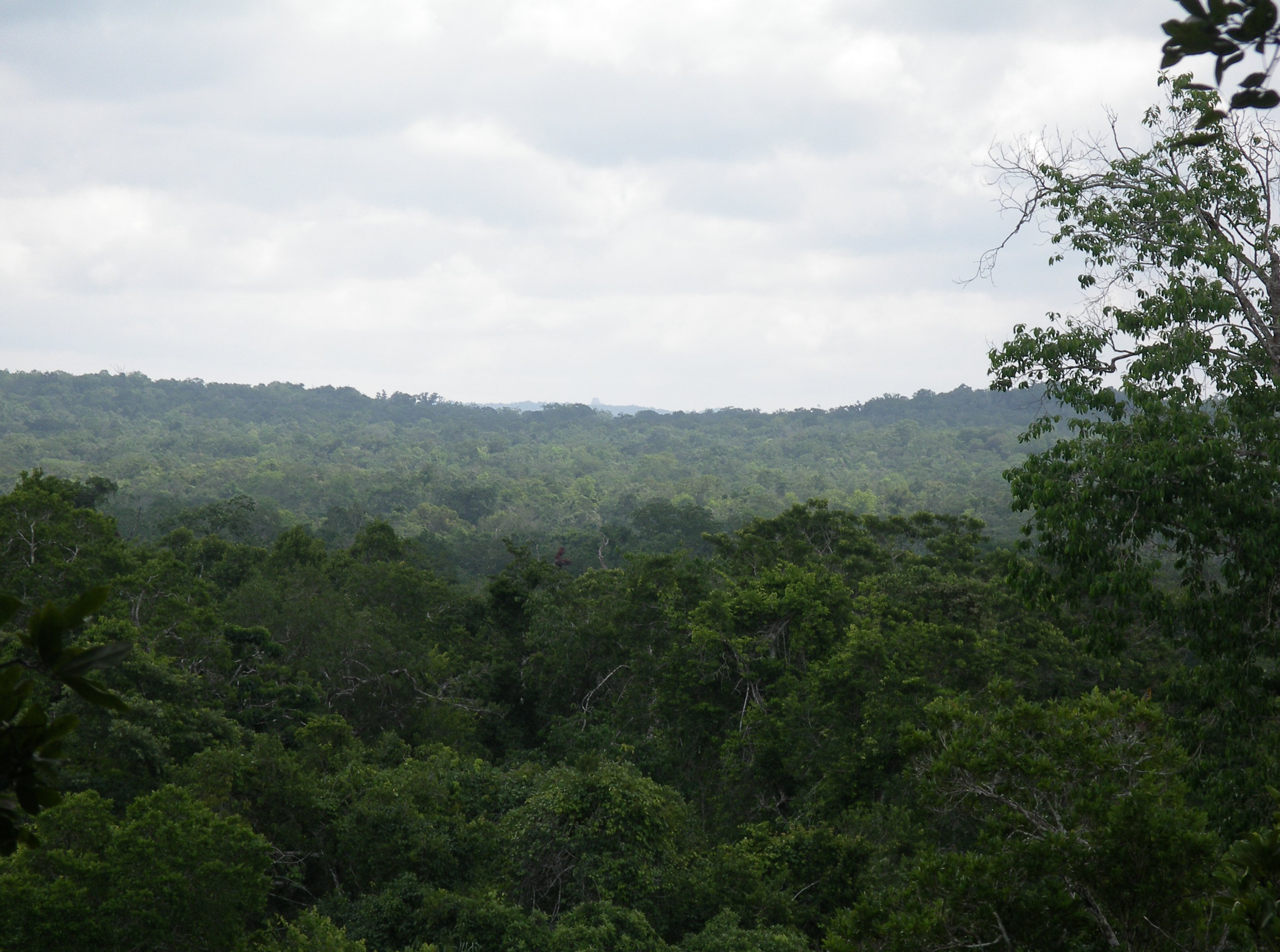

- Location in Guatemala
- Coordinates: 16°59′1.05″N 89°54′3.59″W
- Country: Guatemala
- Department: El Petén

Government
  - Mayor: Gustavo Tesucún Cahuiche (UNE)

Population
  - Total: 3,602
- Climate: Aw

San José is a municipality in the Petén Department of Guatemala. It contains 3,602 people. It lies on the north shore of Lake Petén Itzá and is located a few kilometers from the Classic Period Maya ruin of Motul de San José. El Zotz is also located in the municipality.

== Sports ==
The town is home to Heredia Jaguares de Peten of the Liga Nacional de Fútbol de Guatemala, the top level in Guatemalan football since it moved from Morales in summer 2008.
