= C.D. Marquense =

Association football club in Guatemala

Marquense
- Full name: Club Deportivo Marquense
- Nicknames: Los Indomables Leones de Occidente (The Lions of San Marcos); El Felino de Candacuchex (The Feline of Candacuchex)
- Founded: 1 April 1958; 66 years ago
- Ground: Estadio Marquesa de la Ensenada
- Capacity: 11,000
- Chairman: Rolando Pineda
- Manager: Omar Arellano
- League: Liga Bantrab
- Apertura 2025: 11th
Home colours	Away colours	Third colours

Club Deportivo Marquense (Spanish pronunciation: [klˈub dˌepoɾtˈiβo maɾkˈɛnse]), or simply Marquense, is a Guatemalan professional football club based in San Marcos, Department of San Marcos. They compete in the Liga Bantrab, the top tier of Guatemalan football.

Their home venue is at the Estadio Marquesa de la Ensenada.

== History ==
The club was founded in 1 April 1958, and were promoted to the then Liga Mayor "A" in 1962, remaining in the First Division until 1966, when they finished last or relegation place. They were relegated down as the Segunda Division (third tier in the country), before earning promotion to the Primera División de Ascenso in the 1990s. After more than three decades competing in lower divisions, the team was promoted to the Liga Nacional in May 2000, and they reached the semi-finals of the 2004 Apertura tournament. They finished second in the 2006 Clausura tournament, their best result ever, reaching the final and eliminated by the defending champion Municipal.

Marquense qualified to the UNCAF Club Tournament for the first time in their history after finishing above the loser of the 2005 Apertura final, Comunicaciones, in the overall standings. The team reached the semi-finals of the 2006 UNCAF tournament, where they lost to Costa Rican club Puntarenas, but after beating Victoria of Honduras in the third place match on a 4–1 aggregate, they were able to reach the CONCACAF Champions' Cup for the first time in their history. Marquense played Pachuca, the Mexican First Division defending champions, in the 2007 CONCACAF Champions' Cup quarter-finals, with Pachuca winning the first leg 2–0 at home on February 22, 2007 and 1–0 in San Marcos on 28 February 2007, thus eliminating the Guatemalan team on a 3–0 aggregate.

In the 2007 Clausura tournament, Marquense reached the final, facing rivals Xelajú, who won the title on a 4–2 aggregate score. It was the first time since 1980 that two teams from out of Guatemala City finished as champions and runner-up.

Marquense shares a common rivalry with Xelajú called the Clásico de Occidente and with Malacateco known as the Derbi de San Marcos.

== Honours ==
Primera División de Ascenso

- Champions (2): Apertura 2021, Clausura 2024

== Performance in CONCACAF competitions ==
- Copa Interclubes UNCAF: 1 appearance

2006–07 - Third Place

Year	Opponent	1st leg	2nd leg
2006–07	(El Salvador) Águila	2–0	1–1
2006–07	(Honduras) Marathón	1–1	1–0
2006–07	(Costa Rica) Puntarenas	0–2	0–0
2006–07	(Honduras) Victoria	3–0	1–1

- CONCACAF Champions' Cup: 1 appearance

2006–07 - Quarter-finals

Year	Opponent	1st leg	2nd leg
2006–07	(Mexico) Pachuca	0–2	0–1

== Players ==
=== Current squad ===
Note: Flags indicate national team as defined under FIFA eligibility rules; some limited exceptions apply. Players may hold more than one non-FIFA nationality.

No.	Pos.	Nation	Player
1	GK	ARG	Javier Colli
2	DF	GUA	Elías Vásquez
3	DF	GUA	Fernando Fuentes
5	MF	GUA	Josué Cano
7	MF	GUA	Marvin Ceballos
10	MF	ARG	Miguel Escobar
11	DF	CRC	Aarón Navarro
12	DF	GUA	Alexander Cifuentes
13	DF	GUA	Carlos Estrada (on loan from Municipal)
14	MF	GUA	Andy Ruiz
17	FW	GUA	David Chuc
19	FW	GUA	José Joj
20	MF	GUA	Elvi Elington (on loan from Municipal)

No.	Pos.	Nation	Player
26	FW	PAR	Renato Mencía
29	FW	URU	Diego Casas
52	GK	GUA	Manuel Sosa
53	FW	PAN	Juan Villalobos
66	MF	GUA	Christian López
70	MF	CRC	Dylan Flores
79	DF	PAN	Óscar Linton (captain)
80	MF	GUA	William Amaya
99	DF	GUA	Marco Rodas
—	GK	MEX	Gustavo Gutiérrez
—	DF	MEX	Arturo Ledesma
—	MF	MEX	Fernando Escalante
—	MF	MEX	Luis García

=== Retired numbers ===
4 – (Guatemala) Marcos Menaldo, defender (2017-2022)

== Personnel ==
=== Coaching staff ===
As of June 2025

Position	Staff
Coach	(Guatemala) TBD (*)
Assistant manager	(Guatemala) TBD (*)
Reserve manager	(Guatemala) TBD (*)
Goalkeeper Coach	(Guatemala) TBD (*)
Under 17 Manager	(Guatemala) TBD (*)
Under 15 Manager	(Guatemala) TBD (*)
Sporting director	(Guatemala) TBD (*)
Fitness Coach	(Guatemala) TBD (*)
Team Doctor	(Guatemala) TBD (*)
Fitness Coach	(Guatemala) TBD (*)
Physiotherapy	(Guatemala) TBD (*)
Utility	(Guatemala) TBD (*)

== List of coaches ==
- Adan Onelio Paniagua
- Miguel Angel Puppo
- Francisco Melgar
- César Eduardo Méndez
- Francisco Melgar
- Aldo da Pozzo
- Joaquín Álvarez
- Érick González
- Mauricio Tapia
- Hernán Medford
