= Liga Primera División =

Guatemalan association football league

Liga Primera Gana777
- Organising body: Federación Nacional de Fútbol de Guatemala
- Founded: 1942; 84 years ago
- Country: Guatemala
- Number of clubs: 20
- Level on pyramid: 2
- Promotion to: Liga Bantrab
- Relegation to: Liga Segunda División
- Current champions: Nueva Santa Rosa (1st title)
- Most championships: Petapa; Atlético Mictlán; USAC; Malacateco; Iztapa (3 titles)
- Broadcasters: Claro Sports; Tigo Sports; Canal 11
- Current: 2025–26 Liga Primera División

The Primera División de Ascenso is the second highest level of football in Guatemala. Formerly, it was known as Liga Mayor "B". It is sanctioned by the National Football Federation of Guatemala.

== League format ==
It is composed of two groups of ten teams each. The top 3 teams of each group go to the promotion playoffs. The bottom two teams of each group go to the relegation playoffs against each other. The winner stays, while the loser gets relegated and the winners of the Segunda Division will be automatically promoted.

== Clubs ==
2025–26 season

Group A	Group B
Aguacatán	AFFGuate
Chichicasteco	Carchá
Coatepeque	Chimaltenango
Gomerano	Chiquimulilla
Huehuetecos	Ipala
Juventud Copalera	Iztapa
Nueva Concepción	Nueva Santa Rosa
Quiché	Sacachispas
San Pedro	San Benito
Suchitepéquez	Santa Lucía

== See also ==
- Football in Guatemala – overview of football sport
