= FC Heredia =

Association football club in Guatemala

Heredia
- Full name: Fútbol Club Heredia
- Nicknames: Los Jaguares (The Jaguars); Q-18, Heredianos
- Founded: 1958; 68 years ago
- Ground: Estadio Mario Oswaldo Mena
- Capacity: 9,000
- Chairman: Milton Mendoza
- Manager: Sergio Pardo
- League: Liga Nacional de Fútbol
- Clausura 2013: 2nd (league)
- Website: http://clubdeportivoheredia.com.gt/
Home colours	Away colours

Fútbol Club Heredia is a Guatemalan football club that last played in the Liga Nacional de Fútbol de Guatemala.

== History ==
Founded as Deportivo Heredia in 1958, the club has been based in San Jose, Peten only since summer 2008. The team moved the club from Morales after low attendances and also changed the name to Heredia Jaguares de Peten after they only avoided relegation after appealing against Universidad's use of two suspended players in the first leg of a relegation playoff.

As of September 2011, Club Deportivo Heredia announced its exodus back to Morales, Izabal. Saying that "Morales is the original and native place of the club."

In the spring of 2013 Heredia qualified for the CONCACAF Champions League for the first time in the club's history. On 21 August 2013 they made history again by winning 1–0 the first match of the CCL Group stage against the Canadian club Montreal Impact. The match was played in neutral grounds at the Cementos Progreso stadium in Guatemala City.

The main sponsor is Fuente Del Norte Bus line.

== Stadium ==
The club plays its home games at Estadio Del Monte in Bananera. The stadium, however, does not meet the standards of CONCACAF, therefore CONCACAF Champions League matches are played at the Estadio Cementos Progreso in Guatemala City.

== Squads ==
=== First team ===
Note: Flags indicate national team as defined under FIFA eligibility rules; some limited exceptions apply. Players may hold more than one non-FIFA nationality.

No.	Pos.	Nation	Player
1	GK	GUA	Darwin Méndez
2	DF	GUA	Miguel López
3	DF	GUA	Rodolfo González
4	DF	GUA	Henry Medina
5	DF	GUA	Hetzol Pereira
6	DF	GUA	Rony Guzmán
7	FW	BRA	Anderson
8	MF	GUA	Wilfred Velásquez
9	MF	GUA	David Espinoza
10	MF	GUA	Héctor Saúl de Mata
11	MF	GUA	Fredy García

No.	Pos.	Nation	Player
12	DF	CRC	Roberth Arias
18	DF	GUA	Wilmer García
19	GK	PAN	José Calderón
20	FW	GUA	Rodrigo Hernández
21	FW	GUA	Robin Betancourth
24	MF	GUA	Sergio Guevara
25	MF	GUA	Édgar Cotto
26	FW	COL	Charles Córdoba
29	FW	GUA	Nelson Miranda
33	DF	GUA	Manuel Hernández
77	FW	GUA	Osman López

== List of Coaches ==
- (Guatemala) Francisco Melgar
- (Brazil) Eduardo Santana (2008)
- (Chile) Sergio Pardo (2010–2011)
- (Honduras) Héctor Castellón (2012)
- (Argentina) Juan Carlos Elias (2013–)
