= 2025–26 Liga Bantrab =

73rd professional season of the top-flight football league in Guatemala

Liga Bantrab
- Season: 2025–26
- Dates: 19 July 2025 – 23 May 2026
- Champions: Apertura: Antigua (6th title); Clausura: Municipal (33rd title)
- CONCACAF Central American Cup: Municipal; Mixco; Antigua
- Matches: 95
- Goals: 243 (2.56 per match)
- Top goalscorer: Apertura: Nicolás Martínez: (8 Goals)
- All statistics correct as of 21 November 2025.

The 2025–26 Liga Nacional de Fútbol de Guatemala, also known as Liga Bantrab due to sponsorship reasons, is the 73rd professional season of the top-flight football league in Guatemala. The season is to be divided into two championships—the 2025 Apertura and the 2026 Clausura—each in an identical format and each contested by the same 12 teams.

== Competition format ==
Same as previous years, the season was divided into two short tournaments: Torneo Apertura (opening) and Torneo Clausura (closing), each of which crowning its own champion. Both Apertura and Clausura tournaments were played under the same format which consisted in a Classification phase and a Final phase.

In the classification phase, teams played each other twice on a home-and-away round-robin basis. The top eight teams at the conclusion of the classification stage advanced to the quarter-finals of the final stage.

The final phase was played on a single-elimination format and consisted of the quarter-finals, semi-finals and the finals. All rounds were played on a home-and-away two-legged basis, with the higher-ranked team in the classification phase of each tie hosting the second leg. The quarter-final pairings were pre-determined based on the teams' final position in the classification phase. In the semi-finals the teams were re-seeded based also on their final position in the classification phase in order to determine the two pairings. The quarter-finals and semi-finals matchups were determined as follows:

Quarter-finals

- Match A: Third placed team vs. Sixth placed team
- Match B: Fourth placed team vs. Fifth placed team
- Match C: First placed team vs. Eighth placed team
- Match D: Second placed team vs. Seventh placed team

Semi-finals

- Match I: Second best placed semi-finalist vs. Third best placed semi-finalist
- Match II: Top-placed semi-finalist vs. Fourth best placed semi-finalist

Both champions of the Apertura and Clausura tournaments plus the best placed team on the aggregate table (excluding the two champions) at the end of the season qualified for the 2026 CONCACAF Central American Cup.

== Teams ==
A total of 12 teams took part in this season: the top ten teams from the aggregate table of the 2024–25 season as well as two promoted teams from the 2024–25 Liga Primera División season.

=== Stadiums and locations ===
Locations of the 2025–26 Liga Nos Une teams

| Team | City | Stadium | Capacity |
|---|---|---|---|
| Achuapa | El Progreso | Winston Pineda | 7,300 |
| Antigua | Antigua Guatemala | Pensativo | 10,000 |
| Aurora | Amatitlán | Guillermo Slowing | 12,000 |
| Cobán Imperial | Cobán | Verapaz | 15,000 |
| Comunicaciones | Guatemala City | Cementos Progreso | 17,000 |
| Guastatoya | Guastatoya | David Cordón Hichos | 3,100 |
| Malacateco | Malacatán | Santa Lucía | 8,000 |
| Marquense | San Marcos | Estadio Marquesa de la Ensenada | 11,000 |
| Atlético Mictlán | Asunción Mita | Estadio La Asunción | 4,000 |
| Mixco | Mixco | Santo Domingo de Guzmán | 5,200 |
| Municipal | Guatemala City | El Trébol | 10,000 |
| Xelajú | Quetzaltenango | Mario Camposeco | 11,220 |

=== Personnel and sponsoring ===
| Team | Chairman | Head Coach | Captain | Kitmaker | Shirt Sponsors |
|---|---|---|---|---|---|
| Achuapa | (Guatemala) TBD | (Uruguay) Martín Adrián García | (Guatemala) TBD | TUTO SPORT. | Muni el Progreso, Banrural, Pan Sinaí |
| Antigua | (Guatemala) TBD | (Argentina) Mauricio Tapia | (Guatemala) Jose Ardon | Nino | Valvoline, Banrural, Cayala, Betcris |
| Aurora | (Guatemala) TBD | (Costa Rica) Saúl Phillip | (Guatemala) Allan Garcia | TUTO SPORT | Tributo, Bantrab, ECA Electrodos, Productus del aire, Pepsi |
| Cobán Imperial | (Guatemala) TBD | (Mexico) José Luis Trejo | (Brazil) Janderson Pereira | MG Sports | Domino's, Bantrab, Pepsi, Mayafert |
| Comunicaciones | (Guatemala) TBD | (Mexico) Roberto Hernández | (Guatemala) José Manuel Contreras | Adidas | Banrural, Forza Delivery, Gana777, Gulf Oil |
| Guastatoya | (Guatemala) TBD | (Uruguay) Ariel Sena | (Guatemala) Marlon Sequén | TUTO SPORT | Banrural, Municipalidad de Guastatoya |
| Malacateco | (Guatemala) TBD | (Mexico) José Guadalupe Cruz | (Guatemala) TBD | Silver Sport | Valvoline, Bantrab, Starbus, betcris, Farmancia Batres, Don Ramy |
| Marquense | (Guatemala) TBD | (Costa Rica) Hernán Medford | (Guatemala) Oscar Linto | Guza Sport | Bantrab, Holcim, Chapinwin, Acredicom |
| Atlético Mictlán | (Guatemala) TBD | (Mexico) Adrian García Arias | (Guatemala) TBD | TUTO SPORT | Munimita |
| Mixco | (Guatemala) TBD | (Guatemala) Fabricio Benítez | (Guatemala) Kevin Moscoso | JM12 | Banrural, Gana777 |
| Municipal | (Guatemala) TBD | (Guatemala) Mario Acevedo | (Guatemala) TBD | Umbro | Banrural, Forza delivery, Zeta Gas |
| Xelajú | (Guatemala) TBD | (Guatemala) Amarini Villatoro | (Guatemala) Jorge Aparicio | Kelme | Banrural, Pepsi, Farmancia Batres, Elektra, J.A. Vasquez, Forza delivery |

=== Managerial changes ===
==== Before the start of the season ====
| Team | Outgoing manager | Manner of departure | Date of vacancy | Replaced by | Date of appointment | Position in table |
|---|---|---|---|---|---|---|
| Achuapa | (Mexico) Adrián Arias | Contract finished | May 2025 | (Uruguay) Martín Adrián García | May 2025 | th and Quarterfinalist (TBD) |
| Cobán Imperial | (Mexico) Roberto Montoya | Contract finished | May 2025 | (Mexico) José Luis Trejo | May 2025 | th and Quarterfinalist (TBD) |
| Comunicaciones | (Costa Rica) Rónald González | Contract finished | May 2025 | (Mexico) Roberto Hernández | May 2025 | th and Quarterfinalist (TBD) |
| Guastatoya | (Guatemala) Dwight Pezzarossi | Contract finished | May 2025 | (Uruguay) Ariel Sena | 2025 | th and Quarterfinalist (TBD) |
| Malacateco | (Mexico) Roberto Hernández | Contract finished | May 2025 | (Mexico) José Guadalupe Cruz | June 2025 | th and Quarterfinalist (TBD) |
| Mictlán | (Guatemala) Edwin Vásquez | Contract finished | June 2025 | (Mexico) Adrián Arias | June 2025 | th and Quarterfinalist (TBD) |
| TBD | (Argentina) TBD | Contract finished | 2025 | (Argentina) TBD | 2025 | th and Quarterfinalist (TBD) |
| Municipal | (Argentina) Sebastian Bini | Contract finished | May 2025 | (Nicaragua) Mario Acevedo | June 2025 | th and Quarterfinalist (TBD) |

==== During the Apertura season ====
| Team | Outgoing manager | Manner of departure | Date of vacancy | Replaced by | Date of appointment | Position in table |
|---|---|---|---|---|---|---|
| Marquense | (Costa Rica) Hernán Medford | Sacked | August 11, 2025 | (Argentina) Diego Vázquez | August 21, 2025 | th (2025 Apertura) |
| Guastatoya | (Uruguay) Ariel Sena | Sacked | August 20, 2025 | (Guatemala) Mike Leonardo (Interimship) | August 21, 2025 | th (2025 Apertura) |
| Coban Imperial | (Mexico) Jose Luis Trejo | Mutual Consent | August 2025 | (Argentina) Sebastian Bini | August 2025 | th (2025 Apertura) |
| Guastatoya | (Guatemala) Mike Leonardo | Interimship ended, moved back to assistant coach | September 1, 2025 | (Argentina) Pablo Centrone | September 1, 2025 | th (2025 Apertura) |
| Malacateco | (Mexico) José Guadalupe Cruz | Sacked | September 9, 2025 | (Mexico) Roberto Montoya | September 10, 2025 | th (2025 Apertura) |
| Mictlán | (Mexico) Adrian Garcia Arias | Sacked | September 12, 2025 | (Brazil) Flavio da Silva | September 13, 2025 | th (2025 Apertura) |
| Comunicaciones | (Mexico) Roberto Hernández | Sacked | October 1, 2025 | (Argentina) Iván Sopegno | October 1, 2025 | th (2025 Apertura) |
| Xelajú | (Guatemala) Amarini Villatoro | Sacked | December, 2025 | (Brazil) TBD | December, 2025 | th (2025 Apertura) |
| Achuapa | (Uruguay) Martín García | Resigned | October 2025 | (Uruguay) Álvaro García | October 2025 | th (2025 Apertura) |

==== Between the Apertura and Clausura season ====
| Team | Outgoing manager | Manner of departure | Date of vacancy | Replaced by | Date of appointment | Position in table |
|---|---|---|---|---|---|---|
| Coban Imperial | (Argentina) Sebastian Bini | Mutual Consent | December 2025 | (Uruguay) Martin Garcia | December 2025 | th (2025 Apertura) |
| Marquense | (Argentina) Diego Vázquez | Resigned | December 2025 | (Guatemala) Leonel Noriega | January 2026 | th (2025 Apertura) |
| Xelajú | (Guatemala) Amarini Villatoro | Resigned | December 2025 | (Mexico) Roberto Hernández | December 2025 | th (2025 Apertura) |
| Achuapa | (Uruguay) Álvaro García | Resigned | December 2025 | (Mexico) Rafael Loredo | December 2025 | th (2025 Apertura) |
| Comunicaciones | (Argentina) Iván Franco Sopegno | Resigned | December 2025 | (Chile) Marco Antonio Figueroa | January 2026 | th (2025 Apertura) |

==== During the Clausura season ====
| Team | Outgoing manager | Manner of departure | Date of vacancy | Replaced by | Date of appointment | Position in table |
|---|---|---|---|---|---|---|
| Mictlán | (Brazil) Flavio da Silva | Sacked | February 2026 | (Argentina) Gabriel Alvarez | February 2026 | th (2025 Apertura) |
| Marquense | (Guatemala) Leonel Noriega | Resigned | March 2026 | (Mexico) Omar Arellano | March 2026 | th (2025 Apertura) |
| Achuapa | (Mexico) Rafael Loredo | Resigned | March 2026 | (Uruguay) Álvaro García | March 2026 | th (2025 Apertura) |
| Malacateco | (Mexico) Roberto Montoya | Sacked | March 2026 | (Costa Rica) Mínor Díaz | March 2026 | th (2025 Apertura) |

== Apertura ==
The Apertura 2025 tournament began on 3 August and scheduled to end on 30 November 2025. Xelajú were the defending champions, having won the Clausura 2025 tournament at the previous season.

=== Standings ===
| Pos | Team | Pld | W | D | L | GF | GA | GD | Pts | Qualification |
|---|---|---|---|---|---|---|---|---|---|---|
| 1 | Municipal | 22 | 14 | 6 | 2 | 41 | 14 | +27 | 48 | Advance to Quarter-finals |
| 2 | Mixco | 22 | 14 | 2 | 6 | 33 | 20 | +13 | 44 | Advance to Quarter-finals |
| 3 | Antigua (C) | 22 | 13 | 3 | 6 | 39 | 23 | +16 | 42 | Advance to Quarter-finals |
| 4 | Aurora | 22 | 11 | 6 | 5 | 31 | 28 | +3 | 39 | Advance to Quarter-finals |
| 5 | Malacateco | 22 | 10 | 1 | 11 | 26 | 31 | −5 | 31 | Advance to Quarter-finals |
| 6 | Xelajú | 22 | 8 | 4 | 10 | 32 | 29 | +3 | 28 | Advance to Quarter-finals |
| 7 | Achuapa | 22 | 6 | 7 | 9 | 22 | 29 | −7 | 25 | Advance to Quarter-finals |
| 8 | Atlético Mictlán | 22 | 6 | 6 | 10 | 21 | 23 | −2 | 24 | Advance to Quarter-finals |
| 9 | Marquense | 22 | 6 | 5 | 11 | 17 | 35 | −18 | 23 | |
| 10 | Cobán Imperial | 22 | 6 | 5 | 11 | 21 | 26 | −5 | 23 | |
| 11 | Guastatoya | 22 | 6 | 4 | 12 | 23 | 37 | −14 | 22 | |
| 12 | Comunicaciones | 22 | 5 | 5 | 12 | 15 | 26 | −11 | 20 | |

Source: Soccerway
Rules for classification: 1) Points; 2) Goal difference; 3) Goals for; 4) Away goals for; 5) Matches won; 6) Away matches won; 7) Head-to-head results; 8) Fair play points; 9) Drawing of lots.
(C) Champions

=== Results ===
| Home \ Away | ACH | ANT | ATM | AUR | COB | COM | GUA | MAL | MAR | MIX | MUN | XEL |
|---|---|---|---|---|---|---|---|---|---|---|---|---|
| Achuapa | — | - | 1–0 | 1–2 | 2–1 | 2–1 | 1–0 | 0–1 | 0–0 | 3–2 | 2–2 | 4–1 |
| Antigua | 1–0 | — | 2–0 | 1–2 | 0–0 | 3–1 | 3–1 | 2–1 | 3–0 | 2–1 | 1–1 | 2–1 |
| Atlético Mictlán | 1–0 | 1–2 | — | 4–0 | 1–0 | 1–0 | 2–3 | 2–2 | 1–1 | 0–0 | 0–0 | 2–1 |
| Aurora | 2–1 | 3–2 | - | — | 1–1 | 0–0 | 1–0 | 1–0 | 1–1 | 1–1 | 1–0 | 3–2 |
| Cobán Imperial | 2–2 | 2–2 | 3–1 | 2–0 | — | 3–1 | 2–1 | 0–1 | 3–0 | 0–1 | 0–1 | 2–1 |
| Comunicaciones | 2–0 | 0–3 | 2–0 | 0–2 | 1–0 | — | 2–2 | 1–0 | 3–0 | 0–1 | 0–0 | 1–3 |
| Guastatoya | 0–0 | 0–3 | 1–3 | 3–2 | 0–1 | 0–0 | — | 1–2 | - | 1–0 | 0–3 | 1–2 |
| Malacateco | 2–0 | 3–1 | 1–0 | 1–0 | 3–0 | - | 0–1 | — | 2–1 | 1–2 | 2–3 | 0–1 |
| Marquense | 0–0 | 3–2 | 1–0 | 1–1 | 1–0 | 1–0 | 0–2 | 4–1 | — | 1–2 | 1–3 | 1–0 |
| Mixco | 5–1 | 0–1 | 2–1 | 2–2 | 1–0 | 1–0 | 2–0 | 4–1 | 1–0 | — | 1–0 | 2–1 |
| Municipal | 3–0 | 2–1 | 1–0 | 2–1 | 3–1 | 1–1 | 3–0 | 4–1 | 3–0 | - | — | 1–1 |
| Xelajú | 0–0 | 0–2 | 0–0 | 2–2 | - | 3–0 | 5–0 | 3–0 | 3–1 | 1–2 | 1–1 | — |

Updated to match(es) played on 26 November 2025. Source:
Legend: Blue = home team win; Yellow = draw; Red = away team win.

=== Final phase – Apertura 2025 ===
The final phase of the Apertura tournament ran from 6 December to 28 December 2025.

==== Quarter-finals ====
| Team 1 | Agg. | Team 2 | 1st leg | 2nd leg |
|---|---|---|---|---|
| Municipal | 3–0 | Mictlán | 1–0 | 2–0 |
| Mixco | 2–3 | Achuapa | 2–3 | 0–0 |
| Antigua | 2–1 | Xelajú | 0–1 | 2–0 |
| Aurora | 2–2 (s) | Malacateco | 0–1 | 2–1 |

(s) Aurora advanced due to better regular season position.

==== Semi-finals ====
| Team 1 | Agg. | Team 2 | 1st leg | 2nd leg |
|---|---|---|---|---|
| Municipal | 4–1 | Achuapa | 1–1 | 3–0 |
| Antigua | 5–2 | Aurora | 1–0 | 4–2 |

==== Final ====
| Team 1 | Agg. | Team 2 | 1st leg | 2nd leg |
|---|---|---|---|---|
| Municipal | 1–2 | Antigua | 0–2 | 1–0 |

== Clausura ==
The Clausura 2026 tournament began in January 2026 and ended in May 2026. Antigua GFC are the defending Clausura champions.

=== Standings ===
| Pos | Team | Pld | W | D | L | GF | GA | GD | Pts | Qualification |
|---|---|---|---|---|---|---|---|---|---|---|
| 1 | Xelajú | 22 | 11 | 6 | 5 | 34 | 19 | +15 | 39 | Advance to Quarter-finals |
| 2 | Municipal (C) | 22 | 11 | 5 | 6 | 32 | 21 | +11 | 38 | Advance to Quarter-finals |
| 3 | Mixco | 22 | 10 | 6 | 6 | 30 | 26 | +4 | 36 | Advance to Quarter-finals |
| 4 | Comunicaciones | 22 | 11 | 2 | 9 | 28 | 26 | +2 | 35 | Advance to Quarter-finals |
| 5 | Antigua | 22 | 9 | 7 | 6 | 34 | 29 | +5 | 34 | Advance to Quarter-finals |
| 6 | Cobán Imperial | 22 | 8 | 8 | 6 | 29 | 22 | +7 | 32 | Advance to Quarter-finals |
| 7 | Guastatoya | 22 | 8 | 7 | 7 | 29 | 21 | +8 | 31 | Advance to Quarter-finals |
| 8 | Marquense | 22 | 9 | 3 | 10 | 25 | 29 | −4 | 30 | Advance to Quarter-finals |
| 9 | Mictlán | 22 | 7 | 6 | 9 | 25 | 36 | −11 | 27 | |
| 10 | Malacateco | 22 | 6 | 4 | 12 | 19 | 25 | −6 | 22 | |
| 11 | Aurora | 22 | 4 | 8 | 10 | 14 | 30 | −16 | 20 | |
| 12 | Achuapa | 22 | 5 | 4 | 13 | 17 | 32 | −15 | 19 | |

Rules for classification: 1) Points; 2) Goal difference; 3) Goals for; 4) Away goals for; 5) Matches won; 6) Away matches won; 7) Head-to-head results; 8) Fair play points; 9) Drawing of lots.
(C) Champions

=== Results ===
| Home \ Away | ACH | ANT | ATM | AUR | COB | COM | GUA | MAL | MAR | MIX | MUN | XEL |
|---|---|---|---|---|---|---|---|---|---|---|---|---|
| Achuapa | — | - | 0–2 | 2–1 | 0–1 | 2–3 | 1–0 | 1–0 | 1–2 | 2–0 | 1–2 | 0–0 |
| Antigua | 1–0 | — | 8–2 | 2–0 | 2–2 | 0–1 | 2–0 | 2–1 | 1–0 | 1–2 | 1–0 | 1–1 |
| Atlético Mictlán | 0–1 | 0–0 | — | 2–0 | 1–0 | 1–1 | 0–0 | 1–0 | 2–1 | 2–2 | 2–1 | 2–3 |
| Aurora | 1–0 | 0–2 | 1–0 | — | 1–0 | 2–0 | 0–1 | 1–0 | 0–1 | 1–1 | 2–2 | 0–0 |
| Cobán Imperial | 3–1 | 5–1 | 3–1 | 0–0 | — | 2–0 | 1–1 | 2–0 | 2–0 | 1–1 | 0–0 | 1–1 |
| Comunicaciones | 4–0 | 0–1 | 2–1 | 1–0 | 2–3 | — | 1–0 | 3–2 | 2–1 | 1–0 | 1–0 | 1–3 |
| Guastatoya | 3–1 | 3–0 | 3–1 | 2–2 | 2–0 | 1–3 | — | 1–1 | - | 2–0 | 1–1 | 1–0 |
| Malacateco | 1–1 | 2–2 | 2–0 | 1–1 | 2–0 | - | 1–0 | — | 2–0 | 1–2 | 1–3 | 1–0 |
| Marquense | 1–0 | 1–1 | 3–0 | 0–0 | 3–1 | 1–0 | 2–2 | 1–0 | — | 2–1 | 1–3 | 1–0 |
| Mixco | 1–0 | 2–1 | 2–2 | 4–0 | 1–1 | 2–2 | 1–0 | 1–0 | 2–1 | — | 1–0 | 3–1 |
| Municipal | 1–1 | 4–2 | 1–2 | 4–1 | 0–0 | 1–0 | 2–1 | 1–0 | 1–0 | - | — | 1–0 |
| Xelajú | 3–0 | 1–1 | 2–0 | 4–0 | 2–1 | 2–0 | 1–1 | 1–0 | 4–2 | 2–1 | 3–1 | — |

Source: Soccerway
Legend: Blue = home team win; Yellow = draw; Red = away team win.

=== Final phase – Clausura 2026 ===
The final phase of the Clausura tournament ran from 30 March to 23 May 2026.

==== Quarter-finals ====
| Team 1 | Agg. | Team 2 | 1st leg | 2nd leg |
|---|---|---|---|---|
| Xelajú | 3–1 | Marquense | 1–1 | 2–0 |
| Municipal | 3–0 | Guastatoya | 1–0 | 2–0 |
| Mixco | 2–2 (s) | Cobán Imperial | 0–2 | 2–0 |
| Comunicaciones | 4–3 | Antigua | 2–3 | 2–0 |

(s) Mixco advanced due to better regular season position.

==== Semi-finals ====
| Team 1 | Agg. | Team 2 | 1st leg | 2nd leg |
|---|---|---|---|---|
| Xelajú | 4–2 | Comunicaciones | 2–2 | 2–0 |
| Municipal | 7–0 | Mixco | 2–0 | 5–0 |

==== Final ====
| Team 1 | Agg. | Team 2 | 1st leg | 2nd leg |
|---|---|---|---|---|
| Xelajú | 2–6 | Municipal | 1–4 | 1–2 |

== Aggregate table ==
The aggregate table is used to determine the third qualified team for the 2026 CONCACAF Central American Cup, besides the Apertura and Clausura champions, and the two relegated teams to the 2026–27 Primera División.

| Pos | Team | Pld | W | D | L | GF | GA | GD | Pts | Qualification |
|---|---|---|---|---|---|---|---|---|---|---|
| 1 | Municipal | 44 | 25 | 11 | 8 | 73 | 35 | +38 | 86 | Qualification for the CONCACAF Central American Cup |
| 2 | Mixco | 44 | 24 | 8 | 12 | 63 | 46 | +17 | 80 | Qualification for the CONCACAF Central American Cup |
| 3 | Antigua | 44 | 22 | 10 | 12 | 73 | 52 | +21 | 76 | Qualification for the CONCACAF Central American Cup |
| 4 | Xelajú | 44 | 19 | 10 | 15 | 66 | 48 | +18 | 67 | |
| 5 | Aurora | 44 | 15 | 14 | 15 | 45 | 58 | −13 | 59 | |
| 6 | Cobán Imperial | 44 | 14 | 13 | 17 | 50 | 48 | +2 | 55 | |
| 7 | Comunicaciones | 44 | 16 | 7 | 21 | 43 | 52 | −9 | 55 | |
| 8 | Guastatoya | 44 | 14 | 11 | 19 | 52 | 58 | −6 | 53 | |
| 9 | Malacateco | 44 | 16 | 5 | 23 | 45 | 56 | −11 | 53 | |
| 10 | Marquense | 44 | 15 | 8 | 21 | 42 | 64 | −22 | 53 | |
| 11 | Atlético Mictlán | 44 | 13 | 12 | 19 | 46 | 59 | −13 | 51 | Relegation to Primera División |
| 12 | Achuapa | 44 | 11 | 11 | 22 | 39 | 61 | −22 | 44 | Relegation to Primera División |

Updated to match(es) played on 20 April 2026. Source: Soccerway
Rules for classification: 1) Points; 2) Goal difference; 3) Goals for; 4) Away goals for; 5) Matches won; 6) Away matches won; 7) Head-to-head results; 8) Fair play points; 9) Drawing of lots.

== List of foreign players ==
This is a list of foreign players in 2025-2026 season. The following players:

1. have played at least one apertura game for the respective club.
2. have not been capped for the Guatemala national football team on any level, independently from the birthplace.

A new rule was introduced a few season ago, that clubs can only have five foreign players per club and can only add a new player if there is an injury or player/s is released.

Achuapa

- (Argentina) Agustín Maziero
- (Brazil) Vitor Alves
- (Colombia) Ederson Cabezas
- (Colombia) Yeison Carabalí
- (Honduras) Dayron Suazo

Antigua

- (Argentina) Francisco Apaolaza
- (Colombia) Juan Osorio
- (Costa Rica) Jostin Daly
- (Honduras) Gerson Chávez
- (Paraguay) Milton Maciel
- (Uruguay) Enzo Fernandez
- (Venezuela) Robinson Flores

Aurora

- (Argentina) Nicolas Lovato
- (Argentina) (Italy) Pablo Mingorance
- (Colombia) José Luis Vivas
- (Colombia) Eddie Ibargüen
- (Mexico) Liborio Sánchez

Cobán Imperial

- (Argentina) Tómas Casas
- (Argentina) Matías Rotondi
- (Brazil) Thales Moreira
- (Brazil) Janderson
- (Costa Rica) Anthony López
- (Uruguay) Uri Amaral

Comunicaciones

- (Colombia) José Corena
- (Cuba) Karel Espino
- (Mexico) Ernesto Monreal
- (Mexico) Juan Blanco
- (Mexico) Brian Martínez

Guastatoya

- (Argentina) (Italy) Emanuel Yori
- (Brazil) Antonio Gutemberg
- (Colombia) (Nigeria) Kevin Aladesanmi
- (Costa Rica) Keyshwen Arboine
- (Mexico) José Almanza
- (Paraguay) Rubén Escobar
- (Paraguay) Víctor Avalos

Malacateco

- (Argentina) Ayrton Sisa
- (Colombia) Carlos Anderson Pérez Ochoa
- (Costa Rica) José Guillermo Ortiz
- (Costa Rica) Kenneth Cerdas
- (Ecuador) Byron Angulo
- (Mexico) Victor Torres
- (Mexico) Miguel Jiménez
- (Mexico) Angel Lopez
- (Panama) Irving José Hernández

Marquense

- (Panama) Óscar Linton
- (Panama) Luis Zúniga
- (Uruguay) Diego Casas

Mictlán

- (Brazil) Igor da Silva
- (Colombia) Juan Alejandro Osorio
- (Colombia) Daniel Santa
- (Ecuador) Renny Folleco
- (Panama) Ronaldo Dinolis
- (Uruguay) John Faust
- (Uruguay) Guillermo Chavasco

Mixco

- (Argentina) Gabriel Arce
- (Argentina) Facundo González
- (Argentina) Jorge Sotomayor
- (Argentina) (Uruguay) Nicolás Martínez
- (Brazil) Kennedy Rocha
- (Colombia) Eliser Quiñónes

Municipal

- (Argentina) Cristian Hernández
- (Cuba) Yasniel Matos
- (Cuba) Yunior Pérez
- (Honduras) Eddie Hernández
- (Panama) Davis Contreras
- (Trinidad and Tobago) Aubrey David
- (Uruguay) Darwin Torres

Xelajú

- (Brazil) Romario
- (Colombia) Yilton Díaz
- (Costa Rica) Derrikson Quirós
- (Costa Rica) Steven Cárdenas
- (Paraguay) Manuel Romero
- (Paraguay) Pedro Báez

(player released beginning the Apertura season, Never played a game) (player released during the Apertura season) (player released between the Apertura and Clausura seasons) (player released during the Clausura season) (Injured and ruled out for the rest of the season) (player naturalized for the Clausura season) (player released beginning the Clausura season, Never played a game)
