= Allen Yanes =

Guatemalan footballer (born 1997)

Personal information
- Full name: Allen José Yanes Pinto
- Date of birth: July 4, 1997 (age 29)
- Place of birth: Los Angeles, California, United States
- Height: 1.79 m (5 ft 10 in)
- Position: Left-back

Team information
- Current team: Mixco
- Number: 37

Youth career
- 2010–2015: Achik'

Senior career*
Years	Team	Apps	(Gls)
2015–2018	Antigua	66	(1)
2018–2019	New York Red Bulls II	19	(0)
2020–2023	Comunicaciones	135	(2)
2023–	Mixco	49	(0)

International career^{‡}
2012–2013	Guatemala U17	7	(0)
2014–2015	Guatemala U20	4	(0)
2019	Guatemala U23	6	(0)
2018–	Guatemala	13	(1)
- * Club domestic league appearances and goals as of 20:00, 24 January 2025 (UTC) ‡ National team caps and goals as of 20:00, 5 June 2024 (UTC)

Allen José Yanes Pinto (born 4 July 1997) is a professional footballer who plays as a left-back for Liga Bantrab club Mixco. Born in the United States, he represents the Guatemala national team.

== Early life ==
Yanes was born on 4 July 1997 in Los Angeles, but later moved to Jalapa and lived there for 10 years. At 13 years old, Yanes joined the Achik' youth academy in Guatemala City.

== Club career ==
=== Antigua ===
==== 2015–16: Debut season and first league title ====
In 2015, Yanes signed his first professional contract with Antigua in Liga Nacional de Fútbol de Guatemala. During his first two years with Antigua, he won two league titles in the 2015–16 and 2016–17 seasons.

==== 2016–17: La Segunda ====
On 18 October 2016, Yanes made his CONCACAF Champions League debut in a 3–1 defeat against Alianza.

==== 2017–18: La Tercera and departure ====
Yanes scored his first goal in a 3–2 loss against Suchitepéquez on 19 April 2018. He ended the season with his third consecutive league title.

=== New York Red Bulls II ===
On July 11, 2018 it was announced that Yanes had signed with New York Red Bulls II in the United States. On July 28 he made his debut for the club, coming on as a second-half substitute in a 2-2 draw with Tampa Bay Rowdies.

=== Comunicaciones ===
On 24 December 2019 it was confirmed, that Yanes had returned to Guatemala, joining Comunicaciones.

=== Mixco ===
On 29 June 2023, it was confirmed that Yanes had officially joined Mixco.

== International career ==
Despite being born in the United States, Yanes has represented Guatemala at the U17 and U20 levels. He received his first call up to the senior team in June 2013 for a friendly match against Argentina.

== Career statistics ==
As of 4 November 2018

Club	Season	League		League Cup		Domestic Cup		CONCACAF		Total	
Club	Season	Apps	Goals	Apps	Goals	Apps	Goals	Apps	Goals	Apps	Goals
Antigua GFC	2015–16	16	0	3	0	0	0	0	0	19	0
Antigua GFC	2016–17	21	0	1	0	0	0	1	0	23	0
Antigua GFC	2017–18	29	1	2	0	0	0	0	0	31	1
Total		66	1	6	0	0	0	1	0	73	1
New York Red Bulls II	2018	9	0	3	0	0	0	0	0	12	0
New York Red Bulls II	2019	1	0	0	0	0	0	0	0	1	0
Career total		76	1	9	0	0	0	1	0	86	1

== Honours ==
Antigua

- Liga Nacional: Apertura 2015, Apertura 2016, Apertura 2017

Comunicaciones

- Liga Nacional: 2022 Clausura
- CONCACAF League: 2021
