= 2024–25 Liga Guate =

72nd professional season of the top-flight football league in Guatemala

Liga Guate
- Season: 2024–25
- Champions: Apertura: Xelajú (7th title); Clausura: Antigua (5th title)
- Relegated: Zacapa (disaffiliated)
- CONCACAF Central American Cup: Antigua; Municipal; Xelajú
- Top goalscorer: Apertura: Erick Lemus (9 goals); Clausura: Nicolás Martínez (10 goals)
- Stats are from the regular season only Attendance does not include matches played behind closed doors.

The 2024–25 Liga Guate, also known as Liga Guate Banrural for sponsorship reasons, was the 72nd professional season of the top-flight football league in Guatemala. The season was divided into two championships—the 2024 Apertura and the 2025 Clausura—each in an identical format and each contested by the same 12 teams.

== Competition format ==
Same as previous years, the season was divided into two short tournaments: Torneo Apertura (opening) and Torneo Clausura (closing), each of which crowning its own champion. Both Apertura and Clausura tournaments were played under the same format which consisted in a Classification phase and a Final phase.

In the classification phase, teams played each other twice on a home-and-away round-robin basis. The top eight teams at the conclusion of the classification stage advanced to the quarter-finals of the final stage.

The final phase was played on a single-elimination format and consisted of the quarter-finals, semi-finals and the finals. All rounds were played on a home-and-away two-legged basis, with the higher-ranked team in the classification phase of each tie hosting the second leg. The quarter-final pairings were pre-determined based on the teams' final position in the classification phase. In the semi-finals the teams were re-seeded based also on their final position in the classification phase in order to determine the two pairings. The quarter-finals and semi-finals matchups were determined as follows:

Quarter-finals

- Match A: Third placed team vs. Sixth placed team
- Match B: Fourth placed team vs. Fifth placed team
- Match C: First placed team vs. Eighth placed team
- Match D: Second placed team vs. Seventh placed team

Semi-finals

- Match I: Second best placed semi-finalist vs. Third best placed semi-finalist
- Match II: Top-placed semi-finalist vs. Fourth best placed semi-finalist

Both champions of the Apertura and Clausura tournaments plus the best placed team on the aggregate table (excluding the two champions) at the end of the season qualified for the 2025 CONCACAF Central American Cup.

== Teams ==
A total of 12 teams took part in this season: the top ten teams from the aggregate table of the 2023–24 season as well as two promoted teams from the 2023–24 Primera División season.

=== Stadiums and locations ===
Locations of the 2024–25 Liga Nacional de Guatemala teams

Team	City	Stadium	Capacity
Achuapa	El Progreso	Winston Pineda	6,000
Antigua	Antigua Guatemala	Pensativo	10,000
Cobán Imperial	Cobán	Verapaz	15,000
Comunicaciones	Guatemala City	Doroteo Guamuch Flores	26,000
Deportivo Zacapa	Zacapa	Estadio David Ordoñez Bardales	8,100
Guastatoya	Guastatoya	David Cordón Hichos	3,100
Malacateco	Malacatán	Santa Lucía	8,000
Marquense	San Marcos	Estadio Marquesa de la Ensenada	11,000
Mixco	Mixco	Santo Domingo de Guzmán	5,200
Municipal	Guatemala City	El Trébol	7,500
Xelajú	Quetzaltenango	Mario Camposeco	11,220
Xinabajul-Huehue	Huehuetenango	Los Cuchumatanes	5,340

=== Managerial changes ===
==== Before the start of the season ====
Team	Outgoing manager	Manner of departure	Date of vacancy	Replaced by	Date of appointment	Position in table
TBD	(Argentina) TBD	Contract finished	2024	(Argentina) TBD	2024	th and Quarterfinalist (TBD)
Deportivo Malacateco	(Uruguay) Gabriel Pereyra	Contract finished	June 2024	(Mexico) Roberto Hernandez	June 7, 2024	th and Quarterfinalist (TBD)

==== During the Apertura season ====
Team	Outgoing manager	Manner of departure	Date of vacancy	Replaced by	Date of appointment	Position in table
Deportivo Zacapa	(Mexico) Adrián García Arias	Sacked	September 2024	(Guatemala) Rafael Díaz Aitkenhead	September 2024	th (2024 Apertura)
Deportivo Marquense	(Guatemala) Erick González	Mutual Consent	2024	(Argentina) Mauricio Tapia	October 12, 2024	th (2024 Apertura)
Comunicaciones	(Uruguay) Willy Olivera	Mutual Consent	October 14, 2024	(Costa Rica) Ronald Gonzalez	October 15, 2024	th (2024 Apertura)

==== Between the Apertura and Clausura season ====
Team	Outgoing manager	Manner of departure	Date of vacancy	Replaced by	Date of appointment	Position in table
Marquense	(Argentina) Mauricio Tapia	Resigned	December 12, 2024	(Uruguay) TBD	2024	th (2024 Apertura)
Antigua	(Spain) Javier Lopez	Resigned	December 16, 2024	(Argentina) Mauricio Tapia	December 22, 2024	th (2024 Apertura)

== Apertura ==
The Apertura 2024 tournament began on 3 August and scheduled to end on 23 November 2024. Comunicaciones were the defending champions, having won the Apertura 2023 tournament at the previous season.

=== Standings ===
Pos	Team	Pld	W	D	L	GF	GA	GD	Pts	Qualification
1	Xelajú	16	8	6	2	26	9	+17	30	Advance to Quarter-finals
2	Municipal	16	8	6	2	25	15	+10	30	Advance to Quarter-finals
3	Cobán Imperial	16	7	4	5	25	16	+9	25	Advance to Quarter-finals
4	Malacateco	16	7	4	5	19	13	+6	25	Advance to Quarter-finals
5	Xinabajul	16	7	4	5	26	24	+2	25	Advance to Quarter-finals
6	Comunicaciones	16	7	3	6	24	23	+1	24	Advance to Quarter-finals
7	Antigua	16	6	5	5	27	24	+3	23	Advance to Quarter-finals
8	Mixco	16	6	4	6	15	19	−4	22	Advance to Quarter-finals
9	Achuapa	16	5	6	5	15	17	−2	21	
10	Guastatoya	16	2	8	6	15	19	−4	14	
11	Marquense	16	2	6	8	11	26	−15	12	
12	Zacapa	16	0	6	10	5	28	−23	6	

Source: Soccerway
Rules for classification: 1) Points; 2) Goal difference; 3) Goals for; 4) Away goals for; 5) Matches won; 6) Away matches won; 7) Head-to-head results; 8) Fair play points; 9) Drawing of lots.

=== Results ===
Home \ Away	ACH	ANT	COB	COM	GUA	MAL	MAR	MIX	MUN	XEL	XIN	ZAC
Achuapa	—											
Antigua		—										
Cobán Imperial			—									
Comunicaciones		1–1		—								
Guastatoya					—							0–0
Malacateco	0–2					—						
Marquense							—					
Mixco								—	0–0			
Municipal									—			
Xelajú							3–1			—		
Xinabajul			0–3								—	
Zacapa												—

Updated to match(es) played on 5 August 2024. Source: Soccerway
Legend: Blue = home team win; Yellow = draw; Red = away team win.

==== Top goalscorers ====
Players sorted first by goals scored, then by last name. Goals scored during the final phase are not included as the tournament top scorer award only takes into account goals scored in the classification phase.

No.	Player	Club	Goals
1	(Guatemala) Erick Lemus	Comunicaciones	9
2	(Mexico) Óscar Villa	Xelajú	9
3	(Guatemala) José Martínez	Municipal	7
4	(Argentina) Nicolas Martinez	Mixco	7
5	(Argentina) Santiago Gómez	Antigua	6
6	(Argentina) Matías Rotondi	Municipal	6
7	(Mexico) Ángel López	Malacateco	5
8	(Guatemala) Rudy Munoz	Municipal	5
9	(Guatemala) Kevin Ramirez	Malacateco	5
10	(Paraguay) Julio Cesar Rodriguez	Xinabajul	5
10	(Guatemala) Yeltsin Álvarez	Cobán Imperial	4

=== Final phase – Apertura 2024 ===
The final phase of the Apertura tournament ran from 28 November to 22 December 2024.

== Clausura ==
The Clausura 2025 tournament is scheduled to begin in January and end in May 2025. The defending champions are Municipal, who had won the previous Clausura 2024 tournament.

=== Standings ===
Pos	Team	Pld	W	D	L	GF	GA	GD	Pts	Qualification
1	Municipal	18	10	4	4	25	16	+9	34	Advance to Quarter-finals
2	Antigua	18	8	5	5	27	22	+5	29	Advance to Quarter-finals
3	Cobán Imperial	18	9	2	7	24	22	+2	29	Advance to Quarter-finals
4	Comunicaciones	18	8	5	5	23	21	+2	29	Advance to Quarter-finals
5	Malacateco	18	8	4	6	28	22	+6	28	Advance to Quarter-finals
6	Guastatoya	18	7	4	7	19	21	−2	25	Advance to Quarter-finals
7	Marquense	18	6	5	7	16	19	−3	23	Advance to Quarter-finals
8	Mixco	18	5	7	6	19	21	−2	22	Advance to Quarter-finals
9	Xelajú	19	5	6	8	26	25	+1	21	
10	Achuapa	19	5	4	10	18	21	−3	19	
11	Xinabajul-Huehue	18	4	4	10	19	34	−15	16	

Updated to match(es) played on 20 April 2025. Source: Soccerway
Rules for classification: 1) Points; 2) Goal difference; 3) Goals for; 4) Away goals for; 5) Matches won; 6) Away matches won; 7) Head-to-head results; 8) Fair play points; 9) Drawing of lots.

=== Results ===
Home \ Away	ACH	ANT	COB	COM	GUA	MAL	MAR	MIX	MUN	XEL	XIN
Achuapa	—										
Antigua		—									
Cobán Imperial			—								
Comunicaciones				—							
Guastatoya					—						
Malacateco						—					
Marquense							—				
Mixco								—			
Municipal									—		
Xelajú										—	
Xinabajul-Huehue											—

Updated to match(es) played on unknown. Source: Soccerway
Legend: Blue = home team win; Yellow = draw; Red = away team win.

== Aggregate table ==
The aggregate table is used to determine the third qualified team for the 2025 CONCACAF Central American Cup, besides the Apertura and Clausura champions, and the two relegated teams to the 2025–26 Primera División.

Pos	Team	Pld	W	D	L	GF	GA	GD	Pts	Qualification
1	Municipal	34	18	10	6	50	31	+19	64	Qualification for the CONCACAF Central American Cup
2	Cobán Imperial	34	16	6	12	49	38	+11	54	Qualification for the CONCACAF Central American Cup
3	Malacateco	34	15	8	11	47	35	+12	53	Qualification for the CONCACAF Central American Cup
4	Comunicaciones	34	15	8	11	47	44	+3	53	
5	Antigua	34	14	10	10	54	46	+8	52	
6	Xelajú	35	13	12	10	52	34	+18	51	
7	Mixco	34	11	11	12	41	40	+1	44	
8	Xinabajul	34	11	8	15	45	58	−13	41	
9	Achuapa	35	10	10	15	33	38	−5	40	
10	Guastatoya	34	9	12	13	34	40	−6	39	
11	Marquense	34	8	11	15	27	45	−18	35	Relegation to Primera División
12	Zacapa	16	0	6	10	5	28	−23	6	Relegation to Primera División

Updated to match(es) played on 20 April 2025. Source: Soccerway
Rules for classification: 1) Points; 2) Goal difference; 3) Goals for; 4) Away goals for; 5) Matches won; 6) Away matches won; 7) Head-to-head results; 8) Fair play points; 9) Drawing of lots.
