= Fabricio Benítez =

Guatemalan footballer

Personal information
- Full name: Fabricio Javier Benítez Piriz
- Date of birth: June 11, 1975 (age 51)
- Place of birth: Guatemala City, Guatemala
- Height: 1.68 m (5 ft 6 in)
- Position: Midfielder

Team information
- Current team: Mixco (Manager)

Senior career*
Years	Team	Apps	(Gls)
1997–2004	Cobán Imperial		
2004–2005	Marquense	37	(1)
2005–2007	Antigua	17	(3)
2007–2010	Suchitepéquez		

International career^{‡}
1998–2003	Guatemala	19	(0)
- * Club domestic league appearances and goals as of 22 July 2010 ‡ National team caps and goals as of 22 July 2010

Fabricio Javier Benítez Piriz (born 11 June 1975) is a former Guatemalan football midfielder and manager. He is currently the manager for Liga Nacional club Mixco. Of Uruguayan descent, he is the son of Raul Washington Benitez Touzet, a famous Uruguayan player who played in the decade of the 70's and 80's in Guatemala, and son of Teresita Gladyz Piriz Nuñes, also Uruguayan. He has a younger sister, Jessica Benitez, and an older brother, Eduardo Benitez. He made his debut as a striker in C.D Panzos in 1990

== Club career ==
Benítez has played for Cobán Imperial, Marquense and Antigua at Guatemala's highest level before joining Suchitepéquez in 2007. He was put on the Suchi transfer list in May 2010.

== International career ==
He made his debut for Guatemala in a February 1998 CONCACAF Gold Cup Finals match against Jamaica and has earned a total of 19 caps, scoring no goals. He has represented his country in 7 FIFA World Cup qualification matches and played at the 2003 UNCAF Nations Cup as well as at the 1998 and 2002 CONCACAF Gold Cups.

His final international was a February 2003 UNCAF Nations Cup match against Honduras.
