= List of attendance figures at domestic professional sports leagues =

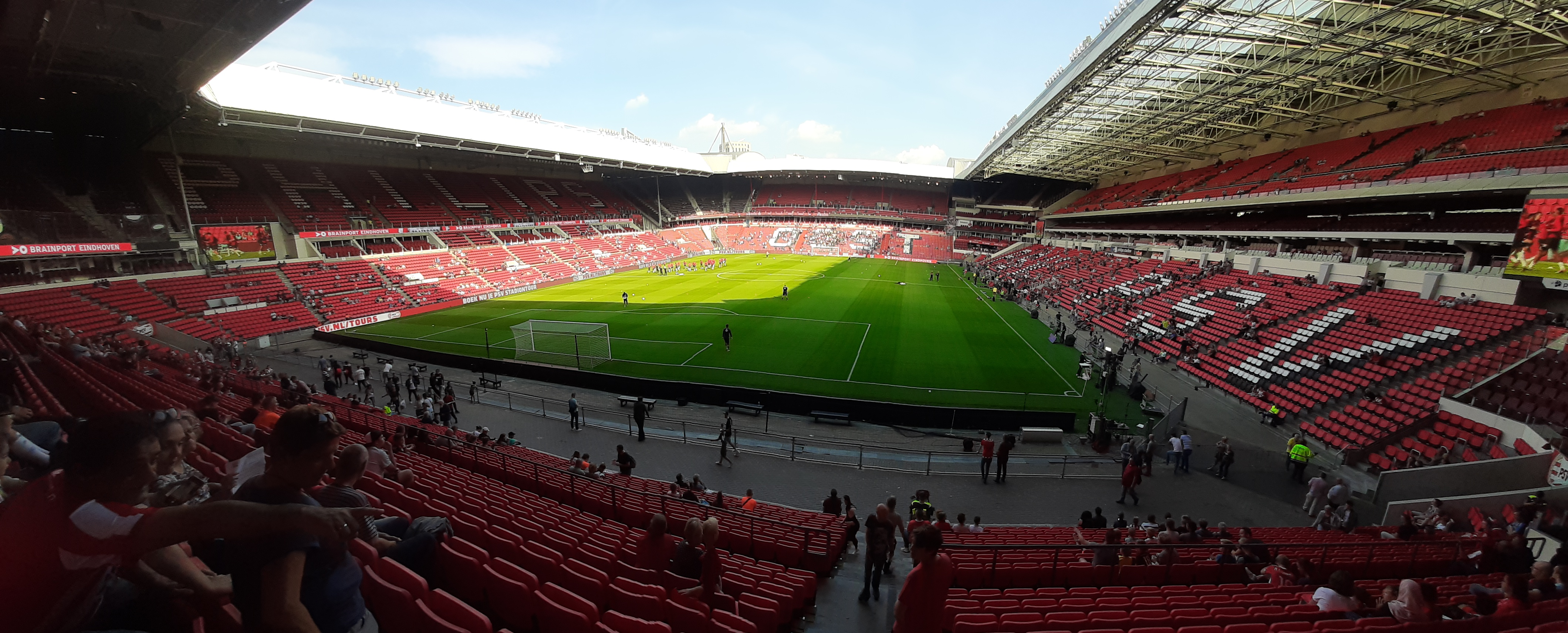
In 2019–20, PSV Eindhoven drew an average home attendance of 33,625.

The table below lists domestic professional sports leagues from around the world by total attendances for the last completed season for which data is available. The following points should be considered:

- In some cases, the figures listed are for main season games only.
- In some sports (mainly North American-centered sports leagues), the main league competition provides each club or franchise with virtually the whole of its attendance and revenue. In others, there are multiple competitions, for example leading English football clubs compete in four competitions each season, but only the league competition is listed below.
- In some sports, for example cricket and rugby union, international competitions and transnational club competitions provide a significant part of total attendances and revenue.
- Free or heavily discounted seats may be counted by some leagues. No-shows for paid seats may be included in some cases, but not in others.
- Not all leagues publish official attendance figures. Various media outlets produce their own figures and sometimes these do not agree, but the differences in the averages given are usually no more than one or two percent.
- In some cases the official attendance figure released by clubs and/or their league may reflect the ticket sell through rather than the number of people in attendance on the night, this can result in a discrepancy of many thousands of attendees per event.
- The "leagues" below include pure league competitions, where the team that finishes at the top of the table is declared the winner, such as the Premier League, and hybrid league/knock-out competitions, where the best league performers enter a knock-out phase (also called a playoff) to decide the winner, such as the National Football League.
- Domestic leagues use either a franchise-based system or a promotion and relegation system. Leagues with a franchise system place, relocate or dissolve teams based on market factors. Leagues with a promotion and relegation system include teams based on their performance in the previous season. Attendance figures for leagues with a promotion and relegation system are more likely to vary each season due to the stadium capacity and support base for participating clubs.

== Top men's leagues in total attendance with a minimum of 8 million ==
League	Inaugural season	Sport	Countries	Pyramid level	Season	Teams	Games	Average capacity	Average attendance	Average attendance as % of average capacity	Total attendance	Ref(s)
Major League Baseball (MLB)	1876	Baseball	United States; Canada	1	2024	30	2,430	43,103	29,361	68.12	71,348,366	
Nippon Professional Baseball (NPB)	1949	Baseball	Japan	1	2024	12	858	35,526	31,098	87.54	26,681,715	
National Hockey League (NHL)	1917	Ice hockey	United States; Canada	1	2024–25	32	1,310	18,332 *	17,568	95.43	23,014,158	
National Basketball Association (NBA)	1946	Basketball	United States; Canada	1	2022–23	30	1,230	19,122 *	18,077	94.06	22,234,502	
National Football League (NFL)	1920	American football	United States	1	2018	32	256	69,800	67,100	96.13	17,177,581	
Premier League (Premier League)	1992	Association football	England	1	2023-24	20	380	39,646	38,390	96.83	14,473,017	
International League (IL) / Pacific Coast League (PCL) (AAA)	1884 (International League)/ 1903 (Pacific Coast League)	Baseball	United States	2	2019	30	2,023	11,149	6,697	59.33	13,500,376	
Major League Soccer (MLS)	1996	Association football	United States; Canada	1	2024	29	522	24,348	23,279	95.60	12,151,608	
Fußball-Bundesliga (Bundesliga)	1963	Association football	Germany	1	2023–24	18	306	40,933	39,490	96.51	12,083,936	
Campeonato Nacional de Liga de Primera División (La Liga)	1929	Association football	Spain	1	2022–23	20	380	38,781	30,500	78.64	11,600,000	
Lega Nazionale Professionisti Serie A (Serie A)	1897	Association football	Italy	1	2022–23	20	380	39,306	29,500	75.05	11,200,000	
KBO League (KBO)	1982	Baseball	South Korea	1	2025	10	720	20,235	17,101	84.51	12,312,519	
Liga Profesional de Fútbol	1891	Association football	Argentina	1	2024	28	376	37,117	27,666	74.54	10,402,454	
Campeonato Brasileiro Série A (Brasileirão)	1937 (first iteration); 1959 (current iteration)	Association football	Brazil	1	2024	20	380	43,176	25,810	59.8	9,807,800	
English Football League Championship (EFL Championship)	2004	Association football	United Kingdom	2	2022–23	24	552	25,877	18,787	72.60	10,351,379	
Championnat de France de football (Ligue 1)	1930	Association football	France; Monaco	1	2022–23	20	380	29,753	24,100	81.0	9,200,000	
Fußball-2.Bundesliga (2.Bundesliga)	1974	Association football	Germany	2	2023–24	18	306	36,078	29,189	80.91	8,931,799	
Liga Mexicana de Béisbol (LMB) / Liga Mexicana del Pacífico (LMP)	1925 (LMB)/ 1945 (LMP)	Baseball	Mexico; United States	1	2019/2019–20	26	1,333	12,488	6,685	53.53	8,911,290	
Eastern League (EL) / Southern League (SL) / Texas League (TL) (AA)	1902 (TL)/ 1923 (EL)/ 1964 (SL)	Baseball	United States	3	2019	30	1,992	7,545	4,429	57.93	8,782,607	
Australian Football League (AFL)	1897	Australian rules football	Australia	1	2024	18	216	58,628	38,365	65.44	8,286,771	
Liga MX (Liga MX)	1943	Association Football	Mexico	1	2022–23	18	306	41,316	22,045	53.35	8,244,861	

* Seating room only

== Top women's leagues in total attendance ==
League	Inaugural season	Sport	Countries	Lvl.	Season	Teams	Games	Attendance		Ref.
League	Inaugural season	Sport	Countries	Lvl.	Season	Teams	Games	Average	Total	Ref.
Women's National Basketball Association (WNBA)	1997	Basketball	United States	1	2026	15	330	11,474	3,800,000	
National Women's Soccer League (NWSL)	2013	Association football	United States	1	2026	16	480	11,003	2,640,000	
Professional Women's Hockey League (PWHL)	2023	Ice hockey	United States; Canada	1	2025–26	6	120	9,304	1,116,497	
Women's Super League (WSL)	2011	Association football	England	1	2025–26	12	132	6,851	904,276	
Liga MX Femenil	2017	Association football	Mexico	1	2023–24	18	306	2,236	684,308	
Frauen-Bundesliga	1990	Association football	Germany	1	2022–23	12	132	2,723	359,404	
AFL Women's (AFLW)	2017	Australian rules football	Australia	1	2024	18	108	2,692	290,707	
A-League Women	2008	Association football	Australia	1	2023–24	12	132	2,146	283,251	
Northern Super League	2025	Association football	Canada	1	2025	6	75	3,637	272,797	
NRL Women's Premiership (NRLW)	2018	Rugby league	Australia	1	2023	10	48	6,057 (Note: 4 regular-season matches are missing attendance numbers. These averages are against the 44 matches for which we have attendance numbers.)	266,511	
Suncorp Super Netball	2017	Netball	Australia	1	2023	8	60	4,437	266,197	
Damallsvenskan	1973	Association football	Sweden	1	2023	14	180	1,101	198,267	
WE League	2020	Association football	Japan	1	2022–23	11	110	1,401	154,141	
Liga Mexicana de Softbol	2024	Softball	Mexico	1	2024	6	60	2,513	150,807	
Women's National Basketball League	1981	Basketball	Australia	1	2022–23	8	91	1,583	144,010	
Women's Big Bash League (WBBL)	2007	Cricket	Australia	1	2018–19	8	57	2,384	135,861	
Division 1 Féminine	1974	Association football	France	1	2022–23	12	132	963	127,094	
Vrouwen Eredivisie	2007	Association football	Netherlands	1	2022–23	11	110	954	104,954	

== Outdoor sports ==
This list is sorted by average attendance per game/match, with a minimum of 2,000. It covers leagues which normally would play in an outdoor stadium, as opposed to those that use indoor arenas. Some outdoor league stadiums are equipped with either retractable or non-retractable roofs where weather conditions (such as rain or extreme heat/cold) would not allow a game to be played or watched effectively, comfortably or safely without such cover.

League	Sport	Country/ies	Pyramid level	Season	Teams	Matches	Total attendance	Average attendance	Ref(s)
National Football League (NFL)	American football	United States	1	2023	32	272	18,911,116	69,526	
Fußball-Bundesliga (Bundesliga)	Association football	Germany	1	2023-24	18	306	12,083,936	39,490	
English Premier League (EPL)	Association football	England	1	2023–24	20	380	14,473,017	38,390	
Australian Football League (AFL)	Australian rules football	Australia	1	2024	18	216	8,286,771	38,365	
Nippon Professional Baseball (NPB)	Baseball	Japan	1	2024	12	858	26,681,715 (Note: Until 2005, the attendance figures in NPB were estimated by the home teams. The estimated figures were normally much higher than the actual numbers of spectators in the game. The total and average attendances only covered regular season games.)	31,098	
Lega Nazionale Professionisti Serie A (Serie A)	Association football	Italy	1	2023-24	20	380	11,729,280	30,867	
Campeonato Nacional de Liga de Primera División (La Liga)	Association football	Spain	1	2022–23	20	380	11,200,000	30,500	
Indian Premier League (IPL)	Twenty20 cricket	India	1	2018	8	60	1,800,263	30,004	
Major League Baseball (MLB)	Baseball	United States; Canada	1	2024	30	2,429	71,348,366	29,374	
Championnat de France de football (Ligue 1)	Association football	France; Monaco	1	2024-25	18	306	8,519,028	27,840	
Liga Profesional de Fútbol	Association football	Argentina	1	2024	28	376	10,402,454	27,666	
Campeonato Brasileiro Série A (Brasileirão)	Association football	Brazil	1	2023	20	380	10,213,460	26,878	
Major League Soccer (MLS)	Association football	United States; Canada	1	2024	29	493	11,509,475	23,346	
Canadian Football League (CFL)	Canadian football	Canada	1	2025	9	81	1,858,266	22,942	
Big Bash League (BBL)	Twenty20 cricket	Australia	1	2024-25	8	44	1,005,506	22,825	
2. Fußball-Bundesliga (2. Bundesliga)	Association football	Germany	2	2022–23	18	306	6,800,413	22,224	
Liga MX	Association football	Mexico	1	2023–24	18	306	6,731,032 (Note: In total with 28 playoff matches total attendance was 7,987,974 and 23,916 in average)	21,996	
National Rugby League (NRL)	Rugby league	Australia; New Zealand	1	2023	17	213	4,335,672 (Note: This figure includes the 9 matches of the 2023 NRL finals series.)	20,355	
J1 League	Association football	Japan	1	2024	20	380	7,721,878	20,321	
Chinese Football Association Super League (Chinese Super League / CSL)	Association football	China	1	2024	16	240	4,770,741	19,878	
All-Ireland Senior Football Championship	Gaelic football	Ireland	1	2017	16	33	628,818	19,035	
English Football League Championship (EFL Championship)	Association football	England; Wales	2	2022–23	24	552	10,351,379	18,787	
Eredivisie	Association football	Netherlands	1	2022–23	18	306	5,700,000	18,600	
Scottish Premiership	Association football	Scotland	1	2022–23	12	228	3,835,434	16,822	
Premiership Rugby	Rugby union	England	1	2023–24	10	93	1,428,276	15,358	
Championnat de France de rugby à XV (Top 14)	Rugby union	France	1	2023-24	14	187	2,775,951	15,252	
KBO League (KBO)	Baseball	South Korea	1	2024	10	721	10,731,646	14,884	
Super Rugby	Rugby union	New Zealand; South Africa; Australia; Argentina; Japan	International clubs competition	2017	18	142	2,049,912	14,436	
Indian Super League (ISL)	Association football	India	1	2018–19	10	81	1,049,674	12,959	
Swiss Super League	Association football	Switzerland	1	2022–23	12	180	2,300,000	12,900	
Ekstraklasa	Association football	Poland	1	2024-25	18	306	3,871,614	12,652	
Primeira Liga	Association football	Portugal	1	2024–25	18	306	3,761,888	12,194	
Pakistan Super League	Twenty20 cricket	Pakistan	1	2018	6	34 (Note: Data includes 4 play-off matches.)	398,765	11,728	1
Japan Rugby League One	Rugby union	Japan	1	2023-24	12	106	972,434	11,762	
Turkish Super League	Association football	Turkey	1	2022–23	19	342	3,900,000	11,400	
United Rugby Championship	Rugby union	Ireland; Italy; Scotland; Wales; South Africa	International clubs competition	2023–24	16	151	1,690,000	11,192	
Currie Cup Premier Division	Rugby union	South Africa	1	2014	8	43	478,392 (Note: This figure includes the 3 matches of the 2014 Semi-finals.)	11,125	(Note: 2014 Currie Cup Premier Division)
2023–24 Belgian Pro League	Association football	Belgium	1	2023–24	16	240	2,654,879	11,062	
English Football League One (EFL League One)	Association football	England	3	2022–23	24	552	5,365,367	10,774	
K League 1	Association football	South Korea	1	2023	12	228	2,447,147	10,733	
Allsvenskan	Association football	Sweden	1	2022	16	240	2,500,000	10,600	
National Women's Soccer League (NWSL)	Women's association football	United States	1	2023	12	132	1,366,581	10,432	
Campeonato Nacional de Liga de Segunda División (La Liga 2)	Association football	Spain	2	2018–19	22	462	4,583,763	10,418	
Chinese Professional Baseball League (CPBL)	Baseball	Taiwan	1	2025	6	360	3,734,429	10,373	
Danish Superliga	Association football	Denmark	1	2022–23	12	193	2,000,000	10,300	
I-League	Association football	India	2	2017–18	10	90	832,665	10,280	
Speedway Ekstraliga	Motorcycle speedway	Poland	1	2026	8	71 (Note: Data includes one promotion/relegation match held at the stadium of a Speedway Ekstraliga team.)	710,748	10,010	
Algerian Ligue Professionnelle 1 (RPL)	Association football	Algeria	1	2023–24	16	240	2,352,600	9,805	1
Mexican Pacific League	Baseball	Mexico	1	2019–20	10	333	3,170,417 (Note: In total with 44 playoff games total attendance was 3,773,473 and 10,009 in average)	9,521	
Russian Premier League (RPL)	Association football	Russia	1	2022–23	16	240	2,300,000	9,400	
Liga 1	Association football	Indonesia	1	2019	18	306	2,863,876	9,359	
China League One	Association football	China	2	2019	16	240	2,199,279	9,164	
Persian Gulf Pro League	Association football	Iran	1	2017–18	16	240	2,138,049	9,060	
A-League Men	Association football	Australia; New Zealand	1	2024-25	13	176	1,590,618	9,038	
Categoría Primera A	Association football	Colombia	1	2014	18	364	3,128,213	8,594	
Dominican Professional Baseball League (LIDOM)	Baseball	Dominican Republic	1	2023-24	6	150	1,297,125	8,648	ref
Super League	Rugby league	England; France	1	2017	12	202	1,182,437	8,568	
Caribbean Premier League	Twenty20 cricket	Jamaica; Trinidad and Tobago; Barbados; Saint Lucia; Antigua and Barbuda	1 (West Indies)	2014	6	30 (Note: Data includes 3 play-off matches.)	250,754	8,358	1
Israeli Premier League	Association football	Israel	1	2022–23	14	240	1,998,042	8,325	
3. Fußball-Liga (3. Liga)	Association football	Germany	3	2022–23	20	380	3,115,102	8,219	
Saudi Professional League	Association football	Saudi Arabia	1	2023-24	18	306	2,496,492	8,158	
Peruvian Primera División	Association football	Peru	1	2024	19	336	2,360,550	7,714	
Super League Greece	Association football	Greece	1	2023–24	14	240	1,290,763	7,683	
J2 League	Association football	Japan	2	2024	20	380	2,913,415	7,667	
Austrian Bundesliga	Association football	Austria	1	2022–23	12	192	1,400,000	7,500	
Lega Nazionale Professionisti B (Serie B)	Association football	Italy	2	2018–19	19	348	2,516,102	7,379	
Premier Soccer League	Association football	South Africa	1	2018–19	16	240	1,751,722	7,329	
Eliteserien	Association football	Norway	1	2023	16	240	1,730,924	7,212	
Mitre Cup 10 Premiership	Rugby union	New Zealand	1	2008	14	77	554,663	7,203	
Campeonato Brasileiro Série B	Association football	Brazil	2	2023	20	380	2,684,996	7,066	
Liga I	Association football	Romania	1	2023-24	16	317	2,232,723	7,066	
T20 Blast	Twenty20 cricket	England; Wales	1	2018	18	133	931,000	7,000	1
Chilean Primera División	Association football	Chile	1	2019	16	193	1,344,587	6,967	
Malaysia Super League	Association football	Malaysia	1	2008	14	182	1,258,348	6,914	
Uzbek Super League	Association football	Uzbekistan	1	2011	14	182	1,272,362	6,911	(Note: UFF Official site)
Championnat de France de football de Ligue 2 (Ligue 2)	Association football	France	2	2018–19	20	380	2,577,990	6,784	
Egyptian Premier League	Association football	Egypt	1	2010–11	16	240	1,615,680	6,732	1
V.League 1	Association football	Vietnam	1	2016	14	182	1,147,900	6,307	
Liga Venezolana de Beisbol	Baseball	Venezuela	1	2017–18	8	238	1,482,238	6,228	
Botola	Association football	Morocco	1	2007–08	16	240	1,486,800	6,195	(Note: GNF Stats)
Liga de Fútbol Profesional Boliviano	Association football	Bolivia	1	2008	12	122	750,056	6,148	
International League (IL) (AAA)^{[I]}	Baseball	United States	2	2024	20	1,419	8,345,881	5,882	
Iraq Stars League	Association football	Iraq	1	2023-24	20	380	2,216,920	5,834	1
English Football League Two (EFL League Two)	Association football	England; Wales	4	2022–23	24	552	3,194,075	5,786	
Pacific Coast League (PCL) (AAA)^{[I]}	Baseball	United States	2	2024	10	738	4,147,066	5,619	
Czech First League	Association football	Czech Republic	1	2022–23	16	240	1,525,708	5,528	
Bangladesh Premier League (BPL)	Twenty20 cricket	Bangladesh	1	2024	7	46	254,242	5,527	1
Women's Super League	Women's association football	England	1	2022–23	12	132	718,608	5,444	
Speedway 2. Ekstraliga	Motorcycle speedway	Poland	2	2026	8	69 (Note: Data includes one promotion/relegation match held at the stadium of a Speedway 2. Ekstraliga team.)	364,235	5,278	
Liga Nos Une	Association football	Guatemala	1	2025–26	12	132	670,428	5,079	1
United Soccer League	Association football	United States; Canada	2 (USL Championship); 3 (USL League One); 4 (USL League Two)	2018	33	561	2,757,833	4,916	
Ecuadorian Serie A	Association football	Ecuador	1	2010	12	261	1,103,873	4,906	
Eerste Divisie	Association football	Netherlands	2	2018–19	20	380	1,801,426	4,741	
Thai League 1	Association football	Thailand	1	2023-24	16	240	1,127,630	4,698	
Kazakhstan Premier League	Association football	Kazakhstan	1	2023	14	182	854,169	4,693	
Liga Mexicana de Béisbol (LMB)	Baseball	Mexico	1	2024	20	864	4,032,870 (Note: In total with 70 playoff games and 1 star game total attendance was 4,648,611 and 4,971 in average)	4,668	
Eastern League (AA)^{[I]}	Baseball	United States	3	2024	12	792	3,659,775	4,621	
1 liga	Association football	Poland	2	2023–24	18	306	1,367,388	4,469	
European League of Football	American Football	Germany; Austria; Spain; France; Switzerland; Poland; Czech Republic; Hungary; Italy	1	2024	17	107	475,238	4,441	
Texas League (AA)^{[I]}	Baseball	United States	3	2024	10	671	2,946,097	4,391	
Russian Football National League	Association football	Russia	2	2018–19	20	380	1,616,498	4,254	
Nemzeti Bajnokság I	Association football	Hungary	1	2023–24	12	198	827,227	4,177	
Ukrainian Premier League	Association football	Ukraine	1	2018–19	12	192	797,940	4,156	1
Liga Profesional de Primera División	Association football	Uruguay	1	2011–12	16	120	498,549	4,155	
Prva HNL	Association football	Croatia	1	2022–23	10	180	735,000	4,084	
Campeonato Brasileiro Série C	Association football	Brazil	3	2016	20	194	762,264	4,055	
Midwest League (A)^{[I]}	Baseball	United States	5	2024	12	753	3,042,514	4,041	
Major League Lacrosse	Field lacrosse	United States; Canada	1	2017	9	64	242,199	3,844	
Canadian Premier League	Association football	Canada	1	2023	8	112	429,915	3,839	
Northern Super League	Women's association football	Canada	1	2025	6	75	272,797	3,637	
County Championship	First-class cricket	England; Wales	1	2015	18	144	513,000	3,562	
Sudan Premier League	Association football	Sudan	1	2018–19	16	168	593,407	3,532	1
Southern League (AA)^{[I]}	Baseball	United States	3	2024	8	518	1,783,897	3,444	
J3 League	Association football	Japan	3	2024	20	380	1,283,794	3,378	
League of Ireland Premier Division	Association football	Ireland	1	2023	10	180	581,446	3,285	
Venezuelan Primera División	Association football	Venezuela	1	2014–15	18	305	992,759	3,255	
National Speedway League	Motorcycle speedway	Poland; Germany; Latvia	3	2026	7	48	155,800	3,245	
UAE Pro-League	Association football	United Arab Emirates	1	2010–11	12	132	427,680	3,240	
South Australian National Football League (SANFL)	Australian rules football	Australia	2	2011	9	102	362,209	3,236	
Baseball Champions League Americas (BCLA)	Baseball	Americas	International clubs competition	2026	5	11	19,034 (Note: The league uses one-day ticket system, where one ticket allows you to watch all games on the same day. This average is the average for each day, not the average for each game.)	3,172	
Scottish Championship	Association football	Scotland	2	2018–19	10	180	561,688	3,120	
South Atlantic League (A)^{[I]}	Baseball	United States	5	2024	12	751	2,269,663	3,022	
Carolina League (A+)^{[I]}	Baseball	United States	4	2024	12	749	2,246,298	2,999	
Liga Nacional de Fútbol de Honduras	Association football	Honduras	1	2023–24	10	90	267,570	2,973	1
Liga FPD	Association football	Costa Rica	1	2016–17	12	132	477,867	2,938	1
Nigeria Premier Football League	Association football	Nigeria	1	2023–24	20	380	1,090,460	2,867	1
Liga de Béisbol Profesional Roberto Clemente (LBPRC)	Baseball	Puerto Rico	1	2025-26	6	133	381,000	2,864	
Northwest League (A−)^{[I]}	Baseball	United States; Canada	6	2024	6	383	1,093,981	2,856	
RFU Championship (Note: When the rugby union governing body of England, the Rugby Football Union, reorganised the country's leagues after the 2008–09 season, it reduced the second tier, previously known as National Division One but now the RFU Championship, from 16 teams to 12.)	Rugby union	United Kingdom	2	2014–15	12	138	377,794	2,738	
American Association (I)^{[I]}	Baseball	United States; Canada	Independent	2024	12	576	1,615,340	2,804	
Frauen-Bundesliga	Women's association football	Germany	1	2022–23	12	132	359,404	2,723	
Veikkausliiga	Association football	Finland	1	2023	12	162	334,000	2,706	
Cypriot First Division	Association football	Cyprus	1	2022–23	14	268	714,000	2,700	
T20 Challenge	Twenty20 cricket	South Africa	1	2017–18	6	30	80,997	2,700	1
Tanzanian Premier League	Association football	Tanzania	1	2023–24	16	240	646,080	2,692	1
Russian Bandy Super League	Bandy	Russia	1	2014–15	13	202	538,412 (Note: This figure includes 26 Classification matches and 20 playoff games.)	2,665	
Atlantic League (I)^{[I]}	Baseball	United States	Independent	2024	10	601	1,600,498	2,663	
Nepal Super League	Association football	Nepal	1	2023	9	40	105,840	2,646	1
New York–Penn League (A−)^{[I]}	Baseball	United States	6	2019	14	498	1,316,873	2,644	
Asia Winter Baseball League	Baseball	Taiwan; Japan; South Korea	International clubs competition	2025	5	44	42,218 (Note: Only weekend games have ticket sales and attendance records. Weekday games are free and do not track attendance. The records listed here are for the 16 weekend games.)	2,639	
Major League Rugby	Rugby union	United States	1	2024	12	103	271,902	2,634	1
Paraguayan Primera División	Association football	Paraguay	1	2011	12	264	690,368	2,615	
China League Two	Association football	China	3	2015	16	112	288,673	2,577	1
AFL Women's	Australian rules football	Australia	1	2022 (S7)	10	38	231,388	2,571	
Liga Mexicana de Softbol (LMS)	Softball	Mexico	1	2024	6	60	150,807	2,513	
Super Smash	Twenty20 cricket	New Zealand	1	2016–17	6	32	80,000	2,500	1
Liga MX Femenil	Women's association football	Mexico	1	2022–23	18	306	367,442	2,483	
Serbian SuperLiga	Association football	Serbia	1	2022–23	16	296	712,000	2,406	
K League 2	Association football	South Korea	2	2023	13	236	564,362	2,391	
Frontier League (I)^{[I]}	Baseball	United States	Independent	2024	16	732	1,736,211	2,372	
Slovak First Football League	Association football	Slovakia	1	2022–23	12	192	448,000	2,334	
Premier League of Bosnia and Herzegovina	Association football	Bosnia and Herzegovina	1	2022–23	12	198	460,000	2,300	
Erovnuli Liga	Association football	Georgia	1	2022	10	180	413,000	2,295	
Lega Pro Group C	Association football	Italy	3	2018–19	19	342	728,378	2,227	
Pioneer League (R)^{[I]}	Baseball	United States	7	2024	10	474	1,052,267	2,220	
Cambodian Premier League	Association football	Cambodia	1	2023/24	10	135	106,456	2,139	
West Australian Football League	Australian rules football	Australia	2	2014	9	94	198,699	2,114	(Note: 2014 WAFL season)
First Professional Football League (Parva Liga)	Association football	Bulgaria	1	2022–23	12	282	603,000	2,100	
California League (A+)^{[I]}	Baseball	United States	4	2024	8	517	1,083,175	2,095	
Belgian Second Division	Association football	Belgium	2	2014–15	18	306	641,219	2,095	

== Indoor sports ==
League	Sport	State(s)	Pyramid level	Season	Teams	Games	Total attendance	Average attendance	Ref
National Basketball Association (NBA)	Basketball	United States; Canada	1	2023–24	30	1,230	22,538,518	18,324	
National Hockey League (NHL)	Ice hockey	United States; Canada	1	2024–25	32	1,310	23,014,158	17,568	
Big3	3x3 basketball	United States	1	2018	8	32	431,500	13,484	
EuroLeague	Basketball	Europe	International clubs competition	2024–25	18	327	3,039,060	10,589	
Nationalliga A	Ice hockey	Switzerland	1	2022–23	12	300	2,979,300	9,931	
Women's National Basketball Association (WNBA)	Women's basketball	United States	1	2024	12	240	2,353,735	9,807	
Kontinental Hockey League (KHL)	Ice hockey	Russia; Belarus; Kazakhstan; China	1	2023–24	25	775	5,929,949	9,396	
Professional Women's Hockey League (PWHL)	Ice hockey	United States; Canada	1	2025–26	6	120	1,116,497	9,304	
National Lacrosse League (NLL)	Indoor lacrosse	United States; Canada	1	2025	15	137	1,111,038	8,110	
National Basketball League (NBL)	Basketball	Australia; New Zealand	1	2024–25	10	145	1,129,449	7,789	
Deutsche Eishockey Liga (DEL)	Ice hockey	Germany	1	2024–25	14	364	1,111,038	7,781	
Philippine Basketball Association (PBA)	Basketball	Philippines	1	2005–06	10	219	737,782 (Note: The total attendance is for games held on Metro Manila only in which almost all gamedates are doubleheaders, and ticket holders pay for both games.)	6,647	
Liga ACB	Basketball	Spain	1	2016–17	17	295 (Note: Data includes 23 play-off matches.)	1,904,534	6,456	
Swedish Hockey League	Ice hockey	Sweden	1	2016–17	14	364	2,077,496	5,707	
American Hockey League (AHL)	Ice hockey	United States; Canada	2	2022–23	32	1,152	6,436,072	5,587	
Handball-Bundesliga (HBL)	Handball	Germany	1	2024–25	18	306	1,690,686	5,525	
Czech Extraliga	Ice hockey	Czech Republic	1	2016–17	14	364	1,884,960	5,178	
Chinese Basketball Association (CBA)	Basketball	China	1	2015–16	20	380	1,791,320	4,714	
Basketball Bundesliga (BBL)	Basketball	Germany	1	2024–25	17	272	1,271,900	4,676	
Liiga	Ice hockey	Finland	1	2024–25	16	480	2,236,155	4,659	
ECHL	Ice hockey	United States	3	2022–23	28	1,008	4,666,886 (Note: This number reflects regular-season games only. With 95 playoff games included, total attendance was 4,231,427, and average of 4,444.)	4,630	
B1 League	Basketball	Japan	1	2023-24	24	672	4,291,816	4,617	
Taiwan Professional Basketball League (TPBL)	Basketball	Taiwan	1	2024-25	7	170 (Note: These statistics include warm-up matches and playoff games.)	767,310	4,514	
Southern Professional Hockey League	Ice hockey	United States	4	2024–25	10	298	1,200,565	4,288	
Lega Basket Serie A (LBA)	Basketball	Italy	1	2023-24	16	240	986,173	4,109	
Korean Basketball League (KBL)	Basketball	South Korea	1	2010–11	10	270	1,027,297	3,805	
P. League+ (PLG)	Basketball	Taiwan	1	2024-25	4	59	212,096	3,595	
LNH Division 1 (LNH)	Handball	France	1	2012–2013	14	182	460,143	3,528	
Nationalliga B	Ice hockey	Switzerland	2	2014–15	9	216	756,000	3,500	
Elite Ice Hockey League	Ice hockey	United Kingdom	1	2022–23	10	320	1,004,000	3,148	
Austrian Hockey League	Ice hockey	Austria; Slovenia; Hungary; Czech Republic; Italy	1	2015–16	12	366	1,111,466 (Note: Data includes 42 play-off matches.)	3,037	
SV.League MEN	Volleyball	Japan	1	2024–25	10	44	664,709	3,021	
HockeyAllsvenskan	Ice hockey	Sweden	2	2016–17	14	364	959,914 (Note: This number reflects regular-season games only)	2,637	
VTB United League	Basketball	Russia; Lithuania; Ukraine; Kazakhstan; Latvia; Estonia; Belarus; Czech Republic; Poland	1	2012–13	20	218	572,747	2,627	
Polish Volleyball League	Volleyball	Poland	1	2025–2026	14	182	663,856	2,515	
Lega Pallavolo Serie A	Volleyball	Italy	1	2014–15	13	156	381,576	2,446	
Russian Basketball Super League	Basketball	Russia	1	2010–11	10	176	385,702	2,401	
Polska Liga Koszykówki	Basketball	Poland	1	2014–15	16	271	551,121	2,034	
Taiwan Professional Volleyball League (TPVL)	Volleyball	Taiwan	1	2025–26	4	103 (Note: The statistics include playoff games.)	211,124	2,050	

== Gallery ==
The association football clubs with the highest average home attendance for domestic league games in the 2022–23 season are included. These are (in descending order): FC Barcelona from Spain, Borussia Dortmund from Germany, Bayern München from Germany, Manchester United from the United Kingdom and AC Milan from Italy.

Stadiums used by the football clubs with the highest average home attendance

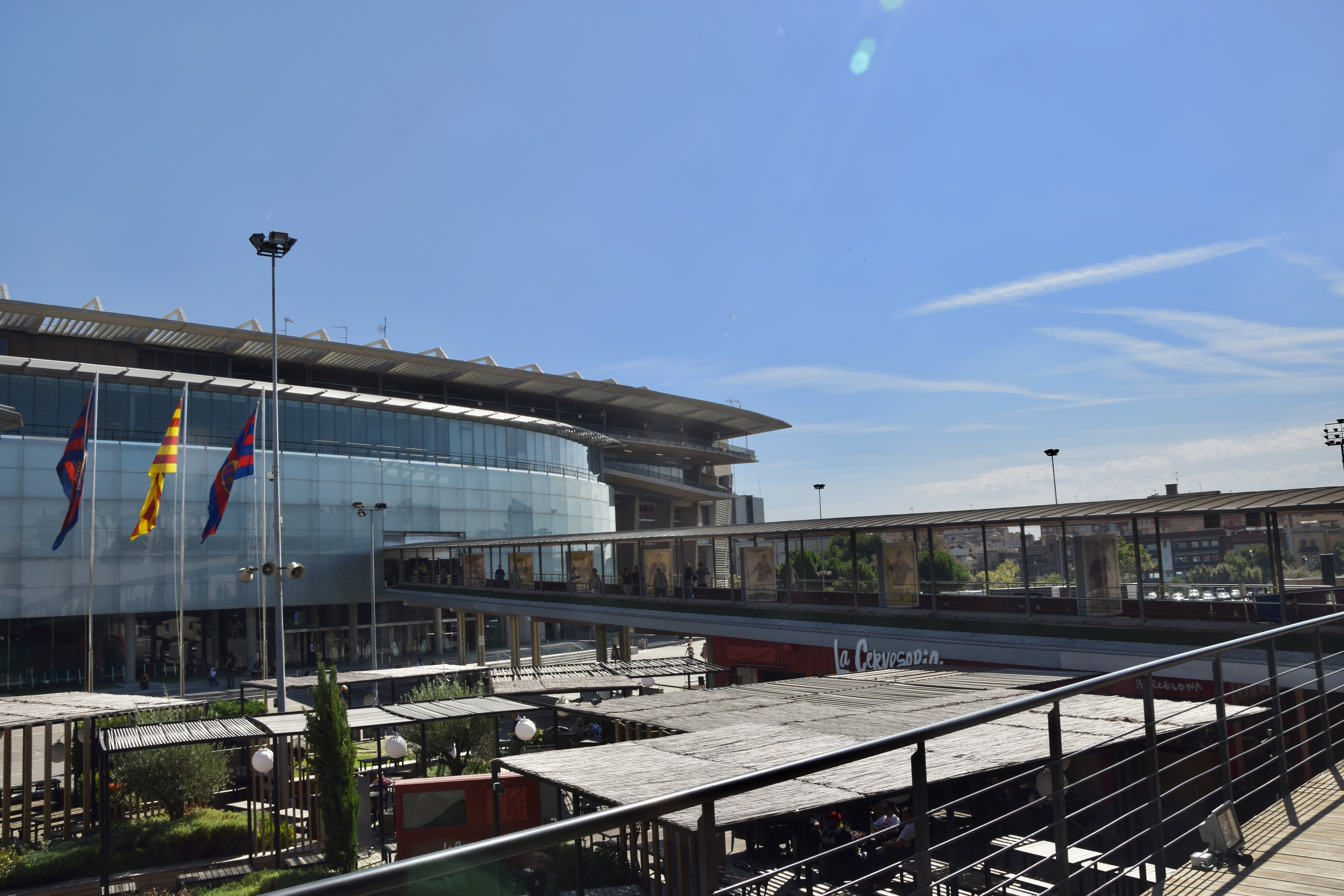
Camp Nou, the home of No. 1 FC Barcelona with 83,383

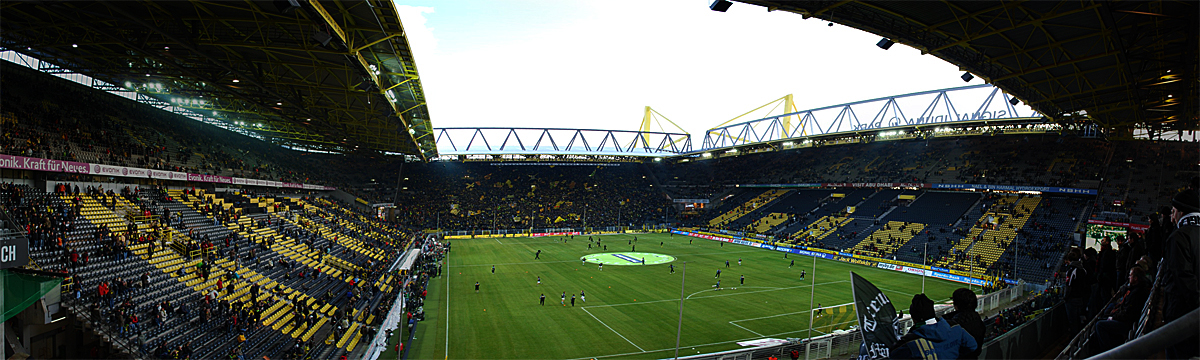
The SIGNAL IDUNA PARK, the home of No. 2 Borussia Dortmund with 80,783

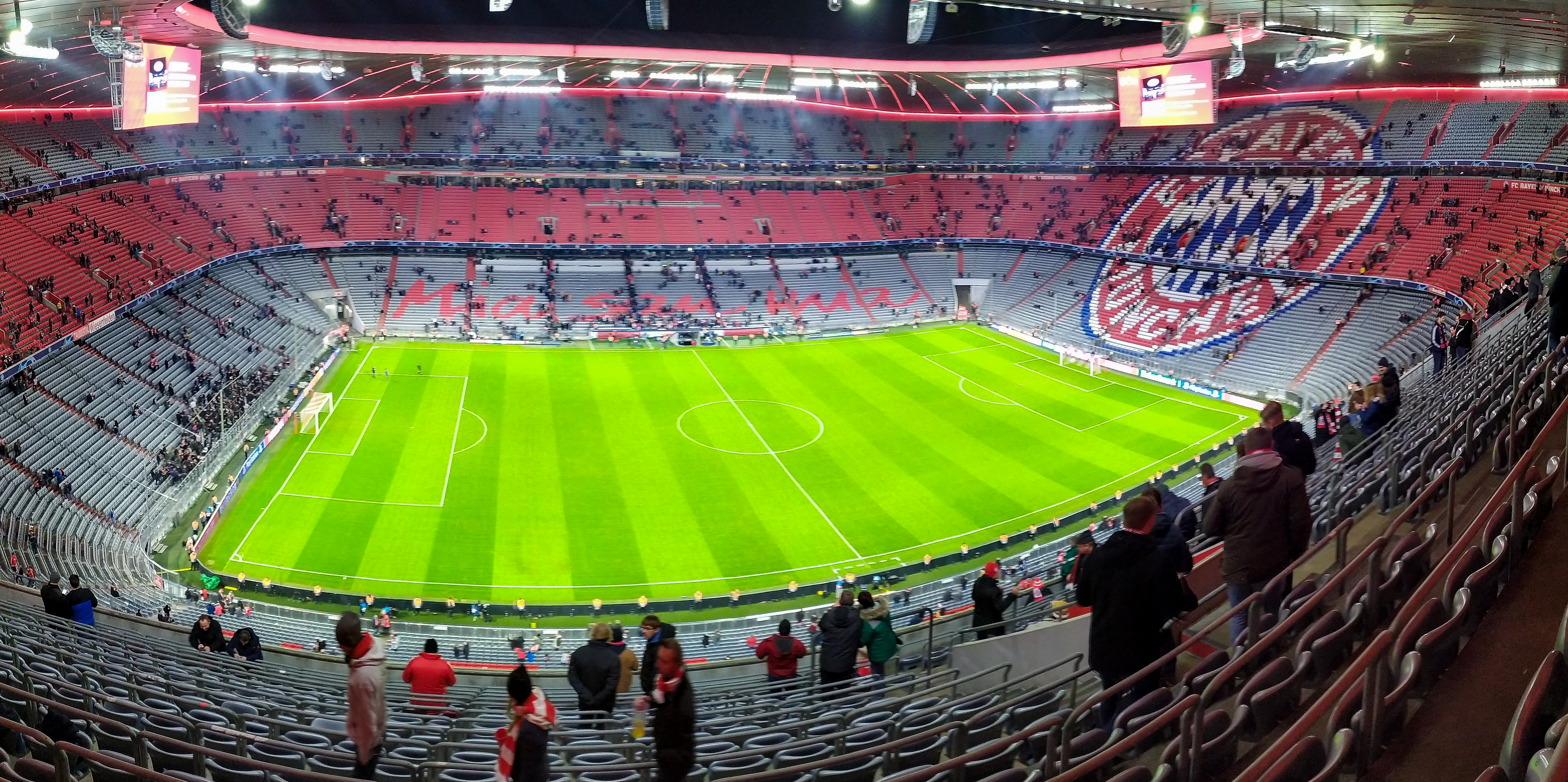
The Allianz Arena, the home of No. 3 Bayern München with 75,000

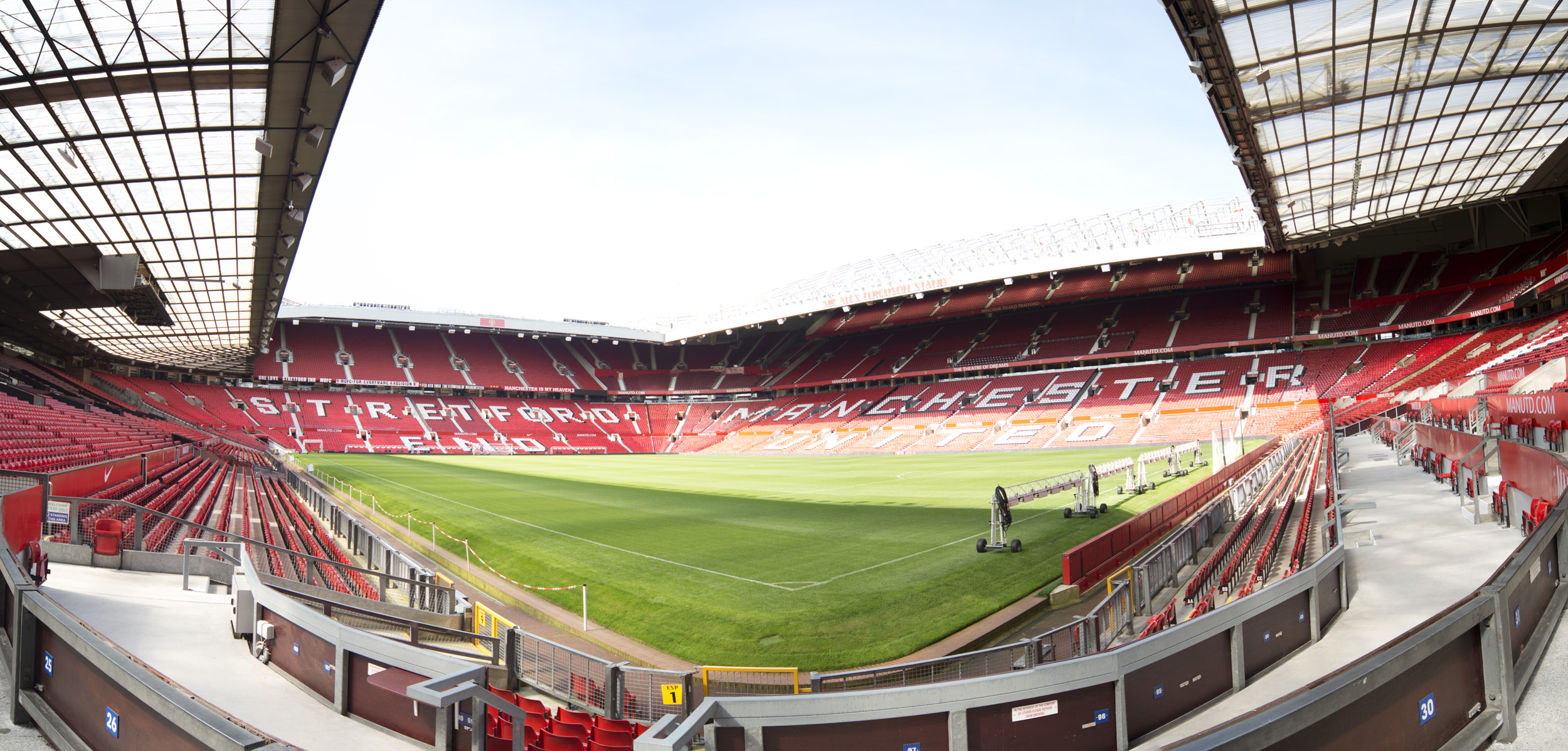
Old Trafford, the home of No. 4 Manchester United with 74,674

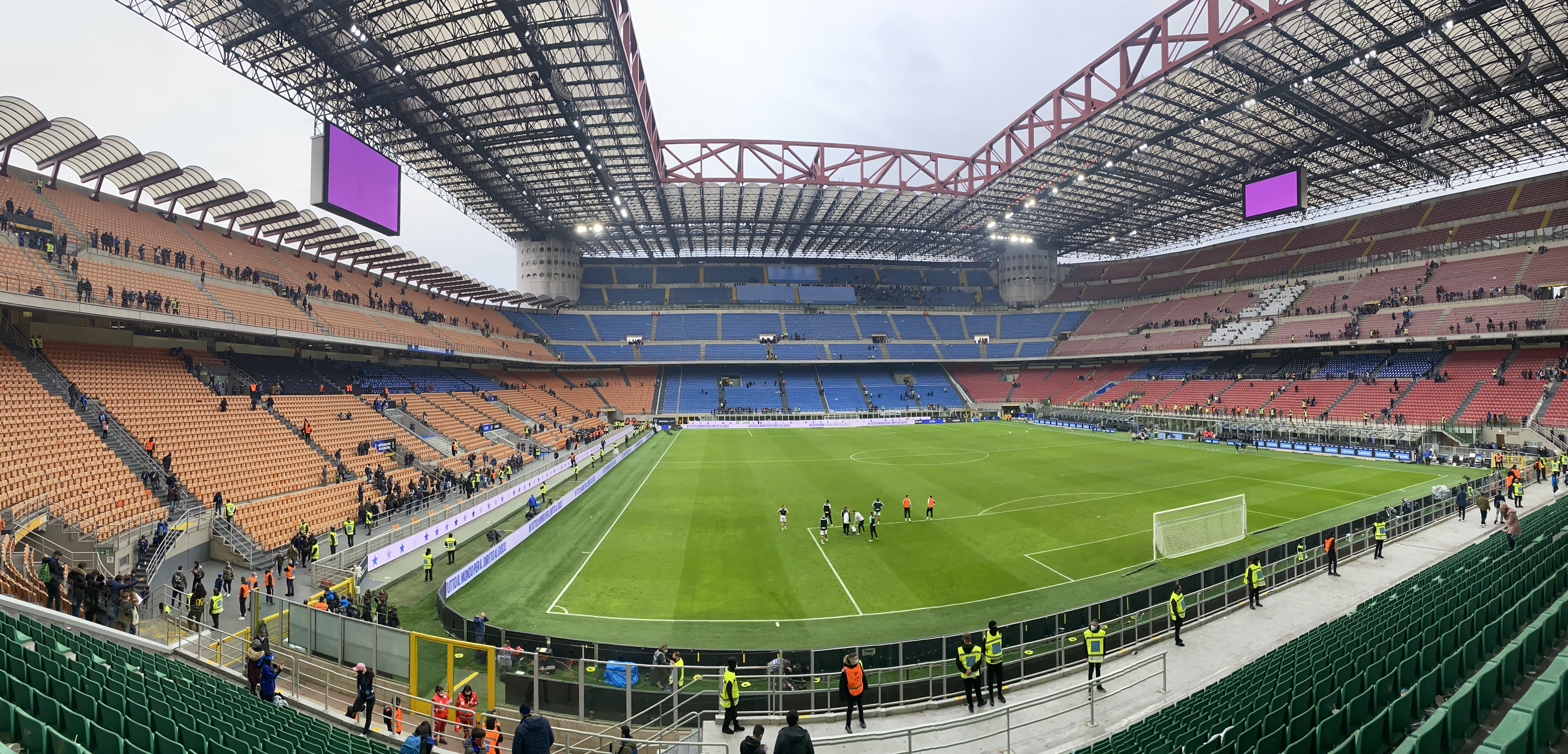
The Stadio Giuseppe Meazza, the home of No. 5 AC Milan with 72,169

== See also ==
- List of professional sports leagues by revenue
- List of sports attendance figures
- Lists of stadiums
