= Gabriel Arce =

Argentine footballer (born 1995)

Personal information
- Full name: Fernando Gabriel Arce
- Date of birth: 1 May 1995 (age 31)
- Place of birth: Godoy Cruz, Argentina
- Height: 1.85 m (6 ft 1 in)
- Position: Centre-forward

Team information
- Current team: Mixco
- Number: 10

Youth career
- CEFAR
- Godoy Cruz
- Gutiérrez
- Independiente

Senior career*
Years	Team	Apps	(Gls)
2016–2018	Independiente	0	(0)
2016–2017	→ Gimnasia y Esgrima (loan)	24	(1)
2018	→ Tulsa Roughnecks (loan)	8	(1)
2018–2019	Estudiantes	12	(1)
2019–2020	Flandria	6	(0)
2020–2023	Talleres (RdE)	0	(0)
2024-	Mixco	0	(0)
- * Club domestic league appearances and goals as of 00:04, 28 December 2019 (UTC)

Fernando Gabriel Arce (born 1 May 1995) is an Argentine professional footballer who plays as a midfielder for Liga Nacional club Mixco.

== Career ==
Arce had spells in the youth systems of CEFAR, Godoy Cruz, Gutiérrez and Independiente. His senior career started with Independiente. In January 2016, Arce joined Primera B Nacional's Gimnasia y Esgrima on loan. He made his professional debut on 28 February versus Almagro, before scoring his first goal in his following appearance against Estudiantes (SL). In total, he played twenty-four times and scored one goal in two seasons with Gimnasia y Esgrima. On 25 January 2018, Arce was loaned to United Soccer League's Tulsa Roughnecks. His first game arrived on 18 March vs. Oklahoma City Energy.

After one goal, versus Phoenix Rising, in eight games for Tulsa Roughnecks, Arce moved to Estudiantes from Independiente in June 2018. He subsequently netted one goal in twelve appearances as they won promotion to Primera B Nacional, though his contract wasn't renewed at the conclusion of the season. Arce then agreed to join Flandria on 17 June 2019. His bow came on 16 August against Argentino.

== Career statistics ==
As of 18 August 2019.

Club statistics
Club	Season	League			Cup		League Cup		Continental		Other		Total	
Club	Season	Division	Apps	Goals	Apps	Goals	Apps	Goals	Apps	Goals	Apps	Goals	Apps	Goals
Independiente	2016	Primera División	0	0	0	0	—		—		0	0	0	0
Independiente	2016–17	Primera División	0	0	0	0	—		0	0	0	0	0	0
Independiente	2017–18	Primera División	0	0	0	0	—		0	0	0	0	0	0
Independiente	Total		0	0	0	0	—		0	0	0	0	0	0
Gimnasia y Esgrima (loan)	2016	Primera B Nacional	9	1	0	0	—		—		0	0	9	1
Gimnasia y Esgrima (loan)	2016–17	Primera B Nacional	15	0	0	0	—		—		0	0	15	0
Gimnasia y Esgrima (loan)	Total		24	1	0	0	—		—		0	0	24	1
Tulsa Roughnecks (loan)	2018	USL	8	1	0	0	—		—		0	0	8	1
Estudiantes	2018–19	Primera B Metropolitana	12	1	0	0	—		—		0	0	12	1
Flandria	2019–20	Primera B Metropolitana	1	0	0	0	—		—		0	0	1	0
Career total			45	3	0	0	—		0	0	0	0	45	3
