= Nicolás Martínez (footballer, born 1991) =

Argentine footballer

Personal information
- Full name: Nicolás Martínez Vargas
- Date of birth: 19 March 1991 (age 35)
- Place of birth: Buenos Aires, Argentina
- Height: 1.79 m (5 ft 10 1/2 in)
- Position: Forward

Team information
- Current team: Mixco
- Number: 99

Senior career*
Years	Team	Apps	(Gls)
2012–2015	All Boys	2	(0)
2013–2014	→ Fénix (loan)	24	(5)
2015–2017	Colegiales	48	(7)
2017	Barnechea	0	(0)
2018–2019	Leandro N. Alem		
2019	Sanarate	23	(9)
2020–2021	Antigua	27	(10)
2021	Achuapa	16	(12)
2021–2022	Águila	23	(7)
2022	Guastatoya	27	(5)
2022–2023	Cobán Imperial	32	(13)
2024–	Mixco	0	(0)
- * Club domestic league appearances and goals as of 4 January 2021 (UTC)

Nicolás Martínez Vargas (born 19 March 1991) is an Argentine professional footballer who plays as a forward for Liga Nacional club Mixco.

== Club career ==
=== All Boys ===
==== 2012–13: Debut season ====
All Boys were Martínez's first senior team. He appeared on the Argentine Primera División club's bench for a match with Boca Juniors in June 2012, before making his professional debut in October against San Martín.

==== 2013–14: Loan to Fénix ====
He spent the 2013–14 season on loan with Fénix in the Primera B Metropolitana. He participated in twenty-six fixtures for Fénix, scoring five goals in the process, which included a brace versus both Deportivo Armenio and Deportivo Morón.

==== 2014–15: Return to All Boys and departure ====
Martínez returned to a relegated All Boys for 2014, before leaving in July 2015 to join Colegiales. He was sent off in his first start against Flandria. Martínez left in 2017 after forty-eight appearances.

=== Barnechea ===
In July 2017, Martínez completed a move to Chilean football by signing for Barnechea in the Primera B. However, he did not play for the first team due to injury issues, though he was on the bench for two occasions.

=== Leandro N. Alem ===
A year after moving to Chile, Martínez returned to his homeland to play for Leandro N. Alem in the Primera C Metropolitana side.

== Career statistics ==
As of 18 December 2018.

Club statistics
Club	Season	League			Cup (Note: Includes the Copa Argentina and Copa Chile)		League Cup		Continental		Other		Total	
Club	Season	Division	Apps	Goals	Apps	Goals	Apps	Goals	Apps	Goals	Apps	Goals	Apps	Goals
All Boys	2011–12	Primera División	0	0	0	0	—		—		0	0	0	0
All Boys	2012–13	Primera División	1	0	0	0	—		—		0	0	1	0
All Boys	2013–14	Primera División	0	0	0	0	—		—		0	0	0	0
All Boys	2014	Primera B Nacional	1	0	0	0	—		—		0	0	1	0
All Boys	2015	Primera B Nacional	0	0	0	0	—		—		0	0	0	0
All Boys	Total		2	0	0	0	—		—		0	0	2	0
Fénix (loan)	2013–14	Primera B Metropolitana	24	5	2	0	—		—		0	0	26	5
Colegiales	2015	Primera B Metropolitana	10	3	0	0	—		—		0	0	10	3
Colegiales	2016	Primera B Metropolitana	12	2	0	0	—		—		0	0	12	2
Colegiales	2016–17	Primera B Metropolitana	26	2	0	0	—		—		0	0	26	2
Colegiales	Total		48	7	0	0	—		—		0	0	48	7
Barnechea	2017	Primera B	0	0	0	0	—		—		0	0	0	0
Leandro N. Alem	2018–19	Primera C Metropolitana	0	0	0	0	—		—		0	0	0	0
Career total			74	12	2	0	—		—		0	0	76	12

== Honours ==
Cobán Imperial

- Liga Nacional de Guatemala: Apertura 2022

Individual

- Juan Carlos Plata Trophy: Clausura 2025
