= 2016–17 Liga Nacional de Guatemala =

64th professional season of the top-flight football league in Guatemala

Liga Nacional de Guatemala
- Season: 2016–17
- Champions: Apertura: Antigua (2nd title); Clausura: Municipal (30th title)
- Relegated: Carchá; Mictlán
- Champions League: None due to FA suspension
- CONCACAF League: None due to FA suspension
- Top goalscorer: TBD (12)
- Biggest home win: TBDl 6 TBD 0 (2015)
- Biggest away win: TBD 1 TBD 3 (2015)
- Longest winning run: TBD (4)
- Longest unbeaten run: TBD (7)
- Longest winless run: TBD (10)
- Longest losing run: TBD (3)

The 2016–17 Liga Nacional de Guatemala was the 64th professional season of the top-flight football league in Guatemala. The season was divided into two championships—the 2016 Apertura and the 2017 Clausura—each in an identical format and each contested by the same 12 teams.

== Format ==
The format for both championships are identical. Each championship will have two stages: a first stage and a playoff stage. The first stage of each championship is a double round-robin format. The teams that finish first and second in the standings will advance to the playoffs semifinals, while the teams that finish 3–6 will enter in the quarterfinals. The winner of each quarterfinal will advance to the semifinals. The winners of the semifinals will advance to the finals, which will determine the tournament champion.

== Apertura ==
The 2016 Torneo Apertura began in July 2016 and will end in December 2016.

=== Personnel and sponsoring ===
Team	Chairman	Head coach	Kitmaker	Shirt sponsor
Antigua	(Guatemala) Rafael Arreaga	(Argentina) Mauricio Tapia	TBD	Pegamex
Carchá	(Guatemala) Douglas Delgado	(Guatemala) Javier Martínez	TBD	TBD
Cobán Imperial	(Guatemala)	(Uruguay) Ariel Sena	Puma	TBD
Comunicaciones	(Mexico) Pedro Portilla	(Argentina) Iván Franco Sopegno	Puma	Bantrab, Gatorade, Zeta Gas
Guastatoya	(Guatemala)	(Guatemala) Amarini Villatoro	TBD	TBD
Malacateco	(Guatemala) TBD	(Costa Rica) Ronald Gómez	TBD	TBD
Marquense	(Guatemala) TBD	(Argentina) Néstor Emilio Soria	TBD	TBD
Mictlán	(Guatemala) TBD	(Guatemala) Sergio Guevara	TBD	TBD
Municipal	(Guatemala) TBD	(Uruguay) Gustavo Machaín	TBD	TBD
Petapa	(Guatemala) Mynor Morales	(Argentina) Ramiro Cepeda	TBD	TBD
Suchitepéquez	(Guatemala) TBD	(Mexico) Enrique Maximiliano Meza	TBD	TBD
Xelajú	(Guatemala) TBD	(Mexico) Rafael Loredo	RetoSports	TBD

=== Table ===
==== Standings ====
Pos	Team	Pld	W	D	L	GF	GA	GD	Pts	Qualification
1	Municipal	22	13	5	4	36	19	+17	44	Qualified to the Semifinals
2	Antigua GFC	22	11	5	6	28	19	+9	38	Qualified to the Semifinals
3	Comunicaciones	22	11	4	7	26	20	+6	37	Qualified to the Quarterfinals
4	Malacateco	22	10	6	6	29	23	+6	36	Qualified to the Quarterfinals
5	Guastatoya	22	11	3	8	26	19	+7	36	Qualified to the Quarterfinals
6	Cobán Imperial	22	10	4	8	26	19	+7	34	Qualified to the Quarterfinals
7	Xelajú MC	22	8	5	9	24	29	−5	29	
8	Marquense	22	7	5	10	25	30	−5	26	
9	Petapa	22	7	4	11	23	31	−8	25	
10	Suchitepéquez	22	6	6	10	28	41	−13	24	
11	Mictlan	22	7	1	14	19	31	−12	22	
12	Carchá	22	3	6	13	16	33	−17	15	

Updated to match(es) played on 2016. Source:
Rules for classification: 1) points; 2) goal difference; 3) number of goals scored.

=== Final phase ===
Quarterfinals
4	Malacateco	1	0	1
5	Guastatoya	0	0	0
3	Comunicaciones	1	1	2
6	Cobán Imperial	0	0	0

Semifinals
1	Municipal	0	2	2
4	Malacateco	1	0	1
2	Antigua	0	1	1
3	Comunicaciones	1	0	1

Final
1	Municipal	1	1	2 (4)
2	Antigua	2	0	2 (5)

=== Quarterfinals ===
Team 1	Agg.	Team 2	1st leg	2nd leg
Guastatoya	0–1	Malacateco	0–1	0–0
Cobán Imperial	0–2	Comunicaciones	0–1	0–1

==== First leg ====
November 30, 2016
19:00 UTC−6

Cobán Imperial	0 – 1	Comunicaciones
	Soccerway	55' É. Chinchilla

Estadio Verapaz Jose Angel Rossi, Cobán, Petapa
Attendance: 1,287
Referee: Walter Alexander López Castellanos

December 1, 2016
15:45 UTC−6

Guastatoya	0 – 1	Malacateco
	Soccerway	24' J. Leroyer

Estadio David Cordón Hichos, Guastatoya
Attendance: 2,584
Referee: Mario Alberto Escobar Toca

==== Second leg ====
December 3, 2016
20:00 UTC−6

Comunicaciones	1 – 0	Cobán Imperial
G. Tinoco 66'	Soccerway

Estadio Cementos Progreso, Guatemala City
Attendance: 5,435
Referee: Mario Ramírez

Comunicaciones won 2–0 on aggregate.

December 4, 2016
12:00 UTC−6

Malacateco	0 – 0	Guastatoya
	Soccerway

Estadio Santa Lucía, Malacatán
Attendance: 6,548
Referee: Juan Carlos Guerra

Malacateco won 1–0 on aggregate.

=== Semifinals ===
Team 1	Agg.	Team 2	1st leg	2nd leg
Deportivo Malacateco	1–2	Municipal	1–0	0–2
Comunicaciones	1–1	Antigua GFC	1–0	0–1

==== First leg ====
December 7, 2016
12:00 UTC−6

Malacateco	1 – 0	Municipal
Edward Santeliz 48'	Soccerway

Estadio Santa Lucía, Malacatán
Attendance: 6,549
Referee: Jonathan Polanco

December 8, 2016
20:00 UTC−6

Comunicaciones	1 – 0	Antigua
E. Lopez 78'	Soccerway

Estadio Cementos Progreso, Guatemala City
Attendance: 7,656
Referee: Oscar Reyna

==== Second leg ====
December 10, 2016
15:00 UTC−6

Municipal	2 – 0	Malacateco
E. Guerra 35'; Janderson 46'	Soccerway

Estadio El Trébol, Guatemala City
Attendance: 5,825
Referee: Sergio Armando Reyna Moller

Municipal won 2–1 on aggregate.

December 11, 2016
11:30 UTC−6

Antigua	1 – 0	Comunicaciones
A. Herrera 81'	Soccerway

Estadio Pensativo, Antigua
Attendance: 6,525
Referee: Bryan López

1-1 on aggregate. Antigua progresses as the higher seed.

=== Finals ===
Team 1	Agg.	Team 2	1st leg	2nd leg
Antigua	2–2; 5–4 (p)	Municipal	2–1	0–1

==== First leg ====
December 15, 2016
15:30 UTC−6

Antigua	2 – 1	Municipal
A. Galindo 11'; M. Russell 68'	Soccerway	26' C. Félix

Estadio Pensativo, Antigua
Attendance: 5,215
Referee: Walter Alexander López Castellanos

==== Second leg ====
December 18, 2016
11:00 UTC−6

Municipal	1 – 0 (a.e.t.)	Antigua
G. Puerari 61'	Soccerway
Penalties
	4 – 5

Estadio Doroteo Guamuch Flores, Guatemala City
Attendance: 8,765
Referee: Mario Alberto Escobar Toca

2-2 on aggregate. Antigua wins 5-4 on penalties.

Apertura 2016 champions

2nd title

== Managerial changes ==
=== Beginning of the season ===
Team	Outgoing manager	Manner of departure	Date of vacancy	Replaced by	Date of appointment	Position in table
Deportivo Petapa	(Argentina) Pablo Centrone	Sacked	May 2016	(Argentina) Ramiro Cepeda	May 2016	th (Clausura 2016)
Xelajú	(Uruguay) Carlos Jurado	Contract not extended	May 2016	(Mexico) Rafael Loredo	May 2016	th (Clausura 2016)
Deportivo Carcha	(Argentina) Daniel Orlando Berta	Contract not extended	May 2016	(Guatemala) Javier Martínez	June 2016	th (Clausura 2016)
C.D. Suchitepéquez	(Guatemala) Douglas Zamora	Sacked	June 2016	(Mexico) Enrique Maximiliano Meza	June 2016	th (Clausura 2016)
Cobán Imperial	(Guatemala) Héctor Julián Trujillo	Sacked	June 2016	(Uruguay) Ariel Sena	June 2016	th (Clausura 2016)

=== During the season ===
Team	Outgoing manager	Manner of departure	Date of vacancy	Replaced by	Date of appointment	Position in table
TBD	(Argentina) TBD	Resigned	2016	(Argentina) TBD	2016	th (2016)
Deportivo Carcha	(Guatemala) Javier Martínez	Resigned	2016	(Guatemala) Héctor Julián Trujillo	2016	th (Apertura 2015)
Deportivo Marquense	(Argentina) Néstor Emilio Soria	Sacked	2016	(Chile) Sergio Pardo	2016	th (Apertura 2015)
Deportivo Guastatoya	(Argentina) Roque Raúl Alfaro	Sacked	2016	(Guatemala) Amarini Villatoro	2016	th (Apertura 2015)
TBD	(Guatemala) TBD	Sacked	2016	(Uruguay) TBD	2016	th (Apertura 2015)

== List of foreign players in the league ==
This is a list of foreign players in 2016-2017 season. The following players:

1. have played at least one apertura game for the respective club.
2. have not been capped for the Guatemala national football team on any level, independently from the birthplace

A new rule was introduced a few season ago, that clubs can only have five foreign players per club and can only add a new player if there is an injury or player/s is released.

Antigua GFC

- (Costa Rica) Víctor Bolivar
- (Honduras) Jorge Zaldívar
- (Costa Rica) Manfred Russell

Coban Imperial

- (Argentina) Francisco Ladogana
- (Paraguay) Orlando Moreira
- (Paraguay) Víctor Solalinde
- (Uruguay) Álvaro García

CSD Comunicaciones

- (Nicaragua) Juan Barrera
- (Costa Rica) Diego Estrada
- (Paraguay) Joel Benítez
- (Argentina) Emiliano Lopez

Guastatoya

' Deportivo Mictlan

- (Colombia) Juan Aguirre
- (Colombia) Marlon Negrete
- (Colombia) William Negrete
- (Panama) Ricardo Romero

Deportivo Malacateco

- (Mexico) Juan Carlos Meza
- (Colombia) Jhon Jairo Palacios
- (Argentina) Carlos Díaz
- (Mexico) Ricardo Rocha

(player released during the season)

Deportivo Marquense

- (Argentina) Matías Triofini

CSD Municipal

- (Uruguay) Darío Flores
- (Mexico) Carlos Kamiani
- (Brazil) Janderson Pereira
- (El Salvador) Jaime Alas
- (Uruguay) Gastón Puerari

Deportivo Petapa

- (Argentina) Juan Lovato
- (Uruguay) Adrian Apellaniz
- (Argentina) Matías Quinteros

CD Suchitepéquez

- (Argentina) Francisco Ladogana
- (Argentina) Mauricio Gerni
- (Argentina) Omar Salazar
- (Canada) David Monsalve

Carchá

- (Uruguay) Pablo Pereira
- (Mexico) Cesar Ivan Garcia
- (Honduras) Luis Rene Rodas
- (Nigeria) Kamar Kayode Oshioke

Club Xelajú MC

- (Costa Rica) Cristhian Lagos
- (Brazil) Juliano Rangel de Andrade
- (Colombia) Juan Baena
- (Honduras) José Mendoza

== Clausura ==
The 2017 Torneo Clausura is expected to begin in January 2017 and end in May 2017.

=== Personnel and sponsoring ===
Team	Chairman	Head coach	Kitmaker	Shirt sponsor
Antigua	(Guatemala) Rafael Arreaga	(Argentina) Mauricio Tapia	TBD	Pegamex
Carchá	(Guatemala) TBD	(Argentina) Daniel Orlando Berta	TBD	TBD
Cobán Imperial	(Guatemala)	(Guatemala) Fabricio Chapa Benitez	Puma	TBD
Comunicaciones	(Mexico) Pedro Portilla	(Argentina) Iván Franco Sopegno	TBD	TBD
Guastatoya	(Guatemala)	(Uruguay) Ariel Sena	TBD	TBD
Malacateco	(Guatemala) TBD	(El Salvador) Nelson Mauricio Ancheta	TBD	TBD
Marquense	(Guatemala) TBD	(Guatemala) Juan Melgar	TBD	TBD
Mictlán	(Guatemala) TBD	(Guatemala) Sergio Guevara	TBD	TBD
Municipal	(Guatemala) TBD	(Uruguay) Gustavo Machaín	TBD	TBD
Petapa	(Guatemala) TBD	(Argentina) Pablo Centrone	TBD	TBD
Suchitepéquez	(Guatemala) TBD	(Guatemala) Walter Claverí	TBD	TBD
Xelajú	(Guatemala) TBD	(Costa Rica) Hernán Medford	RetoSports	TBD

=== Table ===
==== Standings ====
Pos	Team	Pld	W	D	L	GF	GA	GD	Pts	Qualification
1	Municipal	22	8	12	2	19	10	+9	36	Qualified to the Semifinals
2	Petapa	22	10	4	8	27	24	+3	34	Qualified to the Semifinals
3	Guastatoya	22	8	8	6	22	16	+6	32	Qualified to the Quarterfinals
4	Comunicaciones	22	7	9	6	21	16	+5	30	Qualified to the Quarterfinals
5	Suchitepéquez	22	9	3	10	24	28	−4	30	Qualified to the Quarterfinals
6	Xelajú MC	22	8	5	9	30	25	+5	29	Qualified to the Quarterfinals
7	Cobán Imperial	22	7	8	7	17	15	+2	29	
8	Marquense	22	6	10	6	19	16	+3	28	
9	Malacateco	22	6	10	6	17	20	−3	28	
10	Mictlan	22	7	7	8	14	25	−11	28	
11	Antigua GFC	22	6	9	7	28	30	−2	27	
12	Carchá	22	5	5	12	11	24	−13	20	

Updated to match(es) played on 2016. Source:
Rules for classification: 1) points; 2) goal difference; 3) number of goals scored.

=== Final phase ===
Quarterfinals
4	Comunicaciones	0	0	0
5	Suchitepéquez	1	0	1
3	Guastatoya	2	2	4
6	Xelajú MC	2	0	2

Semifinals
1	Municipal	2	1	3
5	Suchitepéquez	1	0	1
2	Petapa	1	3	4
3	Guastatoya	3	2	5

Final
1	Municipal	0	2	2
3	Guastatoya	0	0	0

=== Quarterfinals ===
Team 1	Agg.	Team 2	1st leg	2nd leg
Xelajú	2–4	Guastatoya	2–2	0–2
Suchitepéquez	1–0	Comunicaciones	1–0	0–0

==== First leg ====
June 10, 2017
21:00 UTC−6

Xelajú MC	2 – 2	Guastatoya
W. Zapata 13', 58' (pen.)	Soccerway	5' J. Márquez; 41' J. Vargas

Estadio Mario Camposeco, Quetzaltenango
Attendance: 5,298
Referee: Oscar Reyna

May 11, 2017
13:00 UTC−6

Suchitepéquez	1 – 0	Comunicaciones
G. Tinoco 81'	Soccerway

Estadio Carlos Salazar Hijo, Mazatenango, Suchitepéquez
Attendance: 3,308
Referee: Mario Alberto Escobar Toca

==== Second leg ====
May 13, 2017
15:30 UTC−6

Guastatoya	2 – 0	Xelajú MC
Á. Rodríguez 31', 66'	Soccerway

Estadio David Cordón Hichos, Guastatoya
Attendance: 1,615
Referee: Mario Ramírez

Guastatoya won 4–2 on aggregate.

May 14, 2017
19:00 UTC−6

Comunicaciones	0 – 0	Suchitepéquez
	Soccerway

Estadio Doroteo Guamuch Flores, Guatemala City
Attendance: 2,850
Referee: Sergio Armando Reyna Moller

Suchitepéquez won 1–0 on aggregate.

=== Semifinals ===
Team 1	Agg.	Team 2	1st leg	2nd leg
Suchitepéquez	1–3	Municipal	1–2	0–1
Guastatoya	5–4	Petapa	3–1	2–3

==== First leg ====
May 17, 2017
13:00 UTC−6

Suchitepéquez	1 – 2	Municipal
G. Tinoco 32'	Soccerway	22' G. Puerari; 26' C. Félix

Estadio Carlos Salazar Hijo, Mazatenango, Suchitepéquez
Attendance: 8,278
Referee: Bryan López

May 18, 2017
16:00 UTC−6

Guastatoya	3 – 1	Petapa
J. Vargas 13', 38'; Á. Rodríguez 32'	Soccerway	9' Juliano Rangel

Estadio David Cordón Hichos, Guastatoya
Attendance: 1,440
Referee: Mynor Velásquez

==== Second leg ====
May 20, 2017
16:30 UTC−6

Municipal	1 – 0	Suchitepéquez
90+1' M. Pappa	Soccerway

Estadio Doroteo Guamuch Flores, Guatemala City
Attendance: 10,115
Referee: Mario Ramírez

Municipal won 3–1 on aggregate.

May 21, 2017
19:00 UTC−6

Petapa	3 – 2	Guastatoya
Juliano Rangel 15'; C. Girard 22'; P. Samayoa 65'	Soccerway	78' F. Orellana; 90+1' Á. Rodríguez

Estadio Municipal de San Miguel Petapa, San Miguel Petapa
Attendance: 2,200
Referee: Jonathan Polanco

Guastatoya won 5-4 on aggregate.

=== Finals ===
Team 1	Agg.	Team 2	1st leg	2nd leg
Guastatoya	0–2	Municipal	0–0	0–2

==== First leg ====
May 24, 2017
16:00 UTC−6

Guastatoya	0 – 0	Municipal
	Soccerway

Estadio David Cordón Hichos, Guastatoya
Attendance: 2,200
Referee: Ever López

==== Second leg ====
May 27, 2017
20:00 UTC−6

Municipal	2 – 0	Guastatoya
C. Félix 30'; G. Puerari 64'	Soccerway

Estadio Doroteo Guamuch Flores, Guatemala City
Attendance: 14,548
Referee: Sergio Armando Reyna Moller

Municipal won 2-0 on aggregate.

Clausura 2017 champions

30th title

== Aggregate table ==
Three teams would have qualified for CONCACAF club competitions, but due to FIFA's suspension of Guatemala, these spots were given to other Central American countries.

Pos	Team	Pld	W	D	L	GF	GA	GD	Pts	Qualification or relegation
1	Municipal	44	21	17	6	55	29	+26	80	
2	Comunicaciones	44	19	12	13	56	31	+25	69	
3	Guastatoya	44	19	11	14	44	36	+8	68	
4	Antigua GFC	44	19	11	14	65	59	+6	68	
5	Malacateco	44	16	16	12	46	43	+3	64	
6	Cobán Imperial	44	17	12	15	43	34	+9	63	
7	Petapa	44	17	8	19	50	55	−5	59	
8	Xelajú MC	44	16	10	18	54	54	0	58	
9	Marquense	44	13	15	16	44	46	−2	54	
10	Suchitepéquez	44	15	9	20	52	69	−17	54	
11	Mictlan	44	14	8	22	33	56	−23	50	Relegation play-off
12	Carchá	44	8	11	25	27	57	−30	35	Relegation to 2017-2018 Primera División de Ascenso

Updated to match(es) played on 2016. Source:
Rules for classification: 1) points; 2) goal difference; 3) number of goals scored.
