= Sergio Guevara =

Guatemalan footballer

Personal information
- Full name: Sergio Augusto Guevara González
- Date of birth: July 7, 1973 (age 53)
- Place of birth: Guatemala City, Guatemala
- Height: 1.70 m (5 ft 7 in)
- Position: Midfielder

Senior career*
Years	Team	Apps	(Gls)
2000	Aurora	0	(0)
2000-2011	Municipal	348	(7)
2011-2014	Heredia	85	(1)

International career^{‡}
2004	Guatemala	8	(0)

Managerial career
- 2014-2017: Mictlán
- 2017-2018: USAC
- 2018-2019: Santa Lucía
- 2019: Aurora
- 2020: Santa Lucía
- 2021: San Pedro
- 2021-2022: Mixco
- * Club domestic league appearances and goals as of 13 February 2010 ‡ National team caps and goals as of 13 February 2010

Sergio Augusto Guevara González (born 7 July 1973) is a Guatemalan football coach and former player.

== Club career ==
Nicknamed el Chejo, Guevera has played for Aurora before joining CSD Municipal in 2003.

== International career ==
Guevara made his debut for Guatemala in a March 2004 friendly match against El Salvador and has earned a total of 3 caps, scoring no goals. He has represented his country in 2 FIFA World Cup qualification matches.
