= Álvaro García (footballer, born 1984) =

Uruguayan footballer

Personal information
- Full name: Álvaro Marcelo García Zaroba
- Date of birth: January 13, 1984 (age 42)
- Place of birth: Rocha, Uruguay
- Height: 1.80 m (5 ft 11 in)
- Position: Goalkeeper

Team information
- Current team: CSD ZACAPA
- Number: 19

Senior career*
Years	Team	Apps	(Gls)
2004–2007	Rocha	62	(0)
2007–2008	River Plate	34	(0)
2009	→ Tacuarembó (loan)	7	(0)
2010	Atenas	15	(0)
2010	Rocha	11	(0)
2011–2012	Tacuary	4	(0)
2012–2014	Cerro Largo	25	(0)
2014	Rocha	14	(0)
2015	El Tanque Sisley	3	(0)
2015–2016	Guastatoya	49	(0)
2016–2018	Cobán Imperial	101	(0)
2019	Xelajú MC	30	(0)
2020	Plaza Colonia	5	(0)
2021	Deportivo Zacapa		
2021–	Deportivo Achuapa	19	(0)
- * Club domestic league appearances and goals as of 19:57, 26 December 2021 (UTC)

Álvaro Marcelo García Zaroba (born January 13, 1984, in Rocha), known as Álvaro García, is a Uruguayan footballer who plays for Deportivo Achuapa in Guatemala.
