= Sebastián Bini =

Argentine footballer and manager

Personal information
- Full name: Sebastián Alejandro Bini
- Date of birth: 21 December 1979 (age 46)
- Place of birth: Buenos Aires, Argentina
- Position: Midfielder

Team information
- Current team: Guatemala national under-20 football team (Manager)

Youth career
- Boca Juniors

Senior career*
Years	Team	Apps	(Gls)
2001–2002	Municipal		
2002–2004	Zacapa		
2004	Comunicaciones		
2005	Aurora		
2005	Municipal		
2006–2007	FAS		
2007–2008	CD San Isidro		
2008–2009	Aurora		
2009–2010	Municipal		

Managerial career
- 2019–2021: Municipal
- 2021-2022: Cobán Imperial
- 2022-2023: Águila
- 2023-2025: Municipal
- 2025: Cobán Imperial
- 2026-Present: Guatemala national under-20 football team
- * Club domestic league appearances and goals

Sebastián Alejandro Bini (born 21 December 1979 in Buenos Aires, Argentina) is a former Argentinian footballer and manager. He is currently manager for Guatemala national under-20 football team.

Bini was originally suspended for six months and fined 10,000 dollars, after an incident with Antigua coaching staff following Municipal grand final loss. After an appeal to suspension was reduced to 4 matches and 10,000 dollars.
