= CSD Mixco =

Association football club in Guatemala

Mixco
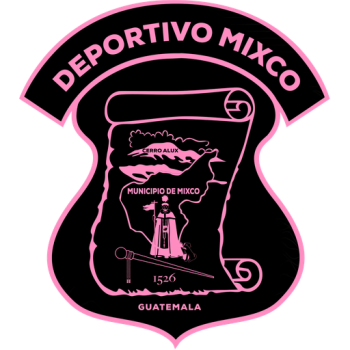
- Full name: Club Social y Deportivo Mixco
- Nicknames: Los Chicharroneros (The Pork Rind Makers); Los Halcones (The Falcons)
- Founded: 1964; 59 years ago
- Ground: Estadio Santo Domingo de Guzmán
- Capacity: 5,200
- Chairman: Neto Bran
- Manager: Fabricio Benítez
- League: Liga Bantrab
- Apertura 2024: 8th (Quarterfinals)
- Website: http://deportivomixco.com/
Home colours	Away colours

Club Social y Deportivo Mixco is a Guatemalan professional football club based in Mixco, a municipality in the Guatemala City metropolitan area. They play in the Liga Bantrab, the top tier of Guatemalan football.

In 2018, the club founded their new stadium Estadio Santo Domingo de Guzmán, until then they played at the Estadio Julio Armando Cobar in San Miguel Petapa.

In the Apertura 2010 they played their home games at the Estadio Municipal San Miguel Dueñas.

== History ==
Nicknamed Los Chicharroneros, the club was founded in 1964 and made their debut at the Guatemalan second level in the 2001/2002 season. They got relegated in 2003 but went back in 2005. They got promoted to the Liga Nacional in 2022.

== Honours ==
=== Domestic honours ===
==== Leagues ====
- Primera División de Ascenso
  - Champions (2): Clausura 2019, Clausura 2022

== Players ==
=== Current squad ===
Note: Flags indicate national team as defined under FIFA eligibility rules; some limited exceptions apply. Players may hold more than one non-FIFA nationality.

No.	Pos.	Nation	Player
1	GK	GUA	Mario Mendoza
2	DF	GUA	Nixsón Flores
3	DF	GUA	Manuel Moreno
5	DF	GUA	Diego Mendez
6	DF	ARG	Jorge Sotomayor
7	FW	GUA	Esteban García
9	FW	BRA	Kennedy Rocha
10	MF	ARG	Gabriel Arce
11	MF	GUA	Yonatan Pozuelos
12	MF	GUA	Jean Márquez (captain)
13	MF	GUA	Jeremy Chinchilla
15	DF	GUA	Rodrigo Marroquín
16	DF	GUA	Jeshua Urizar

No.	Pos.	Nation	Player
19	FW	GUA	Esnaydi Zúñiga
21	MF	GUA	Luis Rosas
22	FW	GUA	Michael Moreira
23	GK	GUA	Mynor Padilla
24	MF	GUA	Óscar González
26	FW	GUA	Christian Ojeda
29	FW	COL	Eliser Quiñónes
30	GK	GUA	Kevin Moscoso
32	FW	ARG	Facundo González
37	DF	GUA	Allen Yanes
61	MF	GUA	Kenner Lemus
77	FW	GUA	Christopher Martínez
99	FW	ARG	Nicolás Martínez

== Personnel ==
=== Coaching staff ===
As of June 2025

Position	Staff
Coach	(Guatemala) TBD (*)
Assistant manager	(Guatemala) TBD (*)
Reserve manager	(Guatemala) TBD (*)
Goalkeeper Coach	(Guatemala) TBD (*)
Under 17 Manager	(Guatemala) TBD (*)
Under 15 Manager	(Guatemala) TBD (*)
Sporting director	(Guatemala) TBD (*)
Fitness Coach	(Guatemala) TBD (*)
Team Doctor	(Guatemala) TBD (*)
Fitness Coach	(Guatemala) TBD (*)
Physiotherapy	(Guatemala) TBD (*)
Utility	(Guatemala) TBD (*)

== List of coaches ==
- (Chile) Jaime García
- (Guatemala) Francisco López
- (Guatemala) Oscar Enrique Sánchez
- (Guatemala) Palmiro Salas
- (Guatemala) Juan Carlos Plata
- (Guatemala) Walter Claverí
- (Guatemala) Sergio Guevara
- (Guatemala) Julio Gómez
- (Costa Rica) Douglas Sequeira
- (Guatemala) Fabricio Benítez
