= Liga Bantrab =

Guatemalan association football league

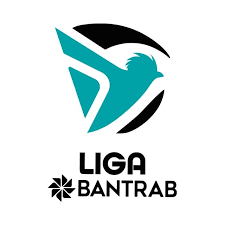
- Founded: 1919; 107 years ago as amateur league 1942; 84 years ago as professional league
- Country: Guatemala
- Confederation: CONCACAF
- Number of clubs: 12 (since 1963–64)
- Level on pyramid: 1
- Relegation to: Liga Primera División
- Domestic cup: Supercopa de Guatemala
- International cup(s): Regional; CONCACAF Central American Cup; Continental; CONCACAF Champions Cup
- Current champions: Municipal (33rd title)
- Most championships: Municipal (33 titles)
- Most appearances: Jairo Arreola (651)
- Top scorer: Juan Carlos Plata (302)
- Broadcasters: Albavisión; Claro Sports; Tigo Sports; TV Azteca Guate
- Sponsor: Bantrab
- Website: ligagt.org
- Current: 2025–26 Liga Bantrab

The Liga Nacional de Fútbol de Guatemala, officially known as the Liga Bantrab for sponsorship reasons, is a professional association football league in Guatemala and the highest level of the Guatemalan football league system. It is controlled by the Federación Nacional de Fútbol de Guatemala and contested by 12 teams.

== Competition format ==
The league has had several different formats throughout its history; currently, the league season is divided into two tournaments. The Apertura, which is played in the fall, and the Clausura, which is played in the spring. The first 6 clubs in the standings at the end of each competition participate in the playoffs to determine the champion, 1st and 2nd place teams qualify directly to semi-finals, while the others have to play in the quarter-finals. The winners of the Apertura and Clausura tournaments participate in the CONCACAF Champions League.

At the end of 2008-2009 Apertura and Clausura tournaments the league expanded to 12 teams to compete in a larger versions of the Apertura and Clausura tournaments. Now the 12th placed team (the team with the fewest points) in the aggregated table standings (combined standings of both the Apertura and Clausura tournaments) is relegated to the Primera División de Ascenso (2nd division) automatically at the end of the Clausura tournament in late May. The teams that finish 10th and 11th in the aggregated table standings enter into a two-legged playoff with the second- and third-placed clubs of the Primera División de Ascenso. The playoff winners play in the top division while the losers spend the next season in the second division.

== History ==
Its first official professional tournament took place in 1942, and succeeded what was known as the Liga Capitalina (League of the Capital), which was an amateur tournament that started in 1919. The 1942–43 tournament was played by seven teams in a double round-robin tournament. Three teams – Municipal, Tipografía Nacional, and Guatemala FC – finished tied for the first place after the two rounds. A playoff between the three teams was conducted to determine the winner, with Municipal earning their first national title.

== Clubs ==
Locations of the 2026–27 Liga Bantrab teams

| Team | City | Stadium | Capacity |
|---|---|---|---|
| Antigua | Antigua Guatemala | Pensativo | 10,000 |
| Aurora | Amatitlán | Guillermo Slowing | 12,000 |
| Cobán Imperial | Cobán | Verapaz | 15,000 |
| Comunicaciones | Guatemala City | Cementos Progreso | 17,000 |
| Guastatoya | Guastatoya | David Cordón Hichos | 3,100 |
| Malacateco | Malacatán | Santa Lucía | 8,000 |
| Marquense | San Marcos | Estadio Marquesa de la Ensenada | 11,000 |
| Mixco | Mixco | Santo Domingo de Guzmán | 5,200 |
| Municipal | Guatemala City | El Trébol | 10,000 |
| San Pedro | San Pedro Sacatepéquez | Estadio Municipal Sampedrano | 4,000 |
| Suchitepéquez | Mazatenango | Carlos Salazar Hijo Stadium | 10,000 |
| Xelajú | Quetzaltenango | Mario Camposeco | 11,220 |

== Managers ==
Current Liga Nacional managers
| Manager | Nationality | Club |
|---|---|---|
| Rónald Gómez | Costa Rica | Achuapa |
| Javier López | Spain | Antigua |
| Roberto Montoya | Mexico | Cobán Imperial |
| Ronald González | Costa Rica | Comunicaciones |
| Dwight Pezzarossi | Guatemala | Guastatoya |
| Roberto Hernández | Mexico | Malacateco |
| Mauricio Tapia | Argentina | Marquense |
| Fabricio Benítez | Guatemala | Mixco |
| Sebastián Bini | Argentina | Municipal |
| Amarini Villatoro | Guatemala | Xelajú |
| Pablo Centrone | Argentina | Xinabajul |
| Rafael Díaz | Guatemala | Zacapa |

== Important matches ==
- Comunicaciones vs Municipal - "El Clásico Chapín"
- Comunicaciones vs Antigua - "El Clásico Provincial"
- Antigua vs Mixco - "El Clásico del Valle"
- Comunicaciones vs Xelajú - "El Clásico del Oeste"
- Marquense vs Xelajú - "El Clásico del Occidente"
- Marquense vs Malacateco - "Derbi de San Marcos"
- Cobán Imperial vs Zacapa - "Clásico del Norte"

== Champions ==
=== Liga Capitalina ===
==== Amateur Era ====
| Ed. | Season | Champion | Runner-up |
|---|---|---|---|
| 1 | 1919 | Allies | Hércules |
| 2 | 1920 | Hércules | España |
| – | 1921 | No tournament due to the Juegos del Centenario | |
| 3 | 1922 | Allies | Alemán |
| 4 | 1923 | La Joya | Allies |
| 5 | 1924 | USAC | Allies |
| 6 | 1925 | La Joya | Hércules |
| 7 | 1926 | USAC | Hércules |
| 8 | 1927 | Hércules | USAC |
| 9 | 1928 | USAC | Allies |
| 10 | 1929 | USAC | Tipografía Nacional |
| 11 | 1930 | USAC | Germania |
| 12 | 1931 | USAC | Germania |
| 13 | 1932 | Guatemala FC | Germania |
| 14 | 1933 | Escuela Politécnica | Tipografía Nacional |
| 15 | 1934 | Escuela Politécnica | Tipografía Nacional |
| 16 | 1935 | Cibeles | Quetzal |
| 17 | 1936 | Cibeles | Quetzal |
| 18 | 1937 | Quetzal | Tipografía Nacional |
| 19 | 1938 | Tipografía Nacional | Municipal |
| 20 | 1939 | Tipografía Nacional | Hércules |
| 21 | 1940 | Tipografía Nacional | Independiente |
| 22 | 1941 | Guatemala FC | Tipografía Nacional |

=== Liga Nacional de Fútbol de Guatemala ===
==== Professional Era ====
| Ed. | Season | Champion | Runner-up |
|---|---|---|---|
| 1 | 1942–43 | Municipal | Tipografía Nacional |
| 2 | 1943 | Tipografía Nacional | Municipal |
| 3 | 1944–45 | Tipografía Nacional | Municipal |
| 4 | 1947 | Municipal | España |
| – | 1948–50 | No tournament due to the 1950 Central American and Caribbean Games | |
| 5 | 1950–51 | Municipal | Comunicaciones |
| 6 | 1952–53 | Tipografía Nacional | Comunicaciones |
| 7 | 1954–55 | Municipal | Comunicaciones |
| 8 | 1956 | Comunicaciones | USAC |
| 9 | 1957–58 | Comunicaciones | Municipal |
| 10 | 1959–60 | Comunicaciones | Municipal |
| 11 | 1961–62 | Xelajú | Comunicaciones |
| 12 | 1963–64 | Municipal | Xelajú |
| 13 | 1964 | Aurora | Municipal |
| 14 | 1965–66 | Municipal | Comunicaciones |
| 15 | 1966 | Aurora | Xelajú |
| 16 | 1967–68 | Aurora | Municipal |
| 17 | 1968–69 | Comunicaciones | Aurora |
| 18 | 1969–70 | Municipal | Aurora |
| 19 | 1970–71 | Comunicaciones | Aurora |
| 20 | 1971 | Comunicaciones | Aurora |
| 21 | 1972 | Comunicaciones | Municipal |
| 22 | 1973 | Municipal | Aurora |
| 23 | 1974 | Municipal | Aurora |
| 24 | 1975 | Aurora | Comunicaciones |
| 25 | 1976 | Municipal | Comunicaciones |
| 26 | 1977–78 | Comunicaciones | Municipal |
| 27 | 1978 | Aurora | Comunicaciones |
| 28 | 1979–80 | Comunicaciones | Cobán Imperial |
| 29 | 1980 | Xelajú | Juventud Retalteca |
| 30 | 1981 | Comunicaciones | Xelajú |
| 31 | 1982 | Comunicaciones | Suchitepéquez |
| 32 | 1983 | Suchitepéquez | Comunicaciones |
| 33 | 1984 | Aurora | Suchitepéquez |
| 34 | 1985 | Comunicaciones | Juventud Retalteca |
| 35 | 1986 | Aurora | Galcasa |
| 36 | 1987 | Municipal | Aurora |
| 37 | 1988–89 | Municipal | Aurora |
| 38 | 1989–90 | Municipal | Suchitepéquez |
| 39 | 1990–91 | Comunicaciones | Municipal |
| 40 | 1991–92 | Municipal | Comunicaciones |
| 41 | 1992–93 | Aurora | Comunicaciones |
| 42 | 1993–94 | Municipal | Escuintla |
| 43 | 1994–95 | Comunicaciones | Aurora |
| 44 | 1995–96 | Xelajú | Comunicaciones |
| 45 | 1996–97 | Comunicaciones | Aurora |
| 46 | 1997–98 | Comunicaciones | Cobán Imperial |
| 47 | 1998–99 | Comunicaciones | Municipal |
| 48 | 1999 Apertura | Comunicaciones | Municipal |
| 49 | 2000 Clausura | Municipal | Comunicaciones |
| 50 | 2000 Apertura | Municipal | Comunicaciones |
| 51 | 2001 Clausura | Comunicaciones | Antigua |
| 52 | 2001 Reordenamiento | Municipal | Cobán Imperial |
| 53 | 2002 Clausura | Municipal | Comunicaciones |
| 54 | 2002 Apertura | Comunicaciones | Municipal |
| 55 | 2003 Clausura | Comunicaciones | Cobán Imperial |
| 56 | 2003 Apertura | Municipal | Comunicaciones |
| 57 | 2004 Clausura | Cobán Imperial | Municipal |
| 58 | 2004 Apertura | Municipal | Comunicaciones |
| 59 | 2005 Clausura | Municipal | Suchitepéquez |
| 60 | 2005 Apertura | Municipal | Comunicaciones |
| 61 | 2006 Clausura | Municipal | Marquense |
| 62 | 2006 Apertura | Municipal | Comunicaciones |
| 63 | 2007 Clausura | Xelajú | Marquense |
| 64 | 2007 Apertura | Jalapa | Suchitepéquez |
| 65 | 2008 Clausura | Municipal | Comunicaciones |
| 66 | 2008 Apertura | Comunicaciones | Municipal |
| 67 | 2009 Clausura | Jalapa | Municipal |
| 68 | 2009 Apertura | Municipal | Comunicaciones |
| 69 | 2010 Clausura | Municipal | Xelajú |
| 70 | 2010 Apertura | Comunicaciones | Municipal |
| 71 | 2011 Clausura | Comunicaciones | Municipal |
| 72 | 2011 Apertura | Municipal | Comunicaciones |
| 73 | 2012 Clausura | Xelajú | Municipal |
| 74 | 2012 Apertura | Comunicaciones | Municipal |
| 75 | 2013 Clausura | Comunicaciones | Heredia |
| 76 | 2013 Apertura | Comunicaciones | Heredia |
| 77 | 2014 Clausura | Comunicaciones | Municipal |
| 78 | 2014 Apertura | Comunicaciones | Municipal |
| 79 | 2015 Clausura | Comunicaciones | Municipal |
| 80 | 2015 Apertura | Antigua | Guastatoya |
| 81 | 2016 Clausura | Suchitepéquez | Comunicaciones |
| 82 | 2016 Apertura | Antigua | Municipal |
| 83 | 2017 Clausura | Municipal | Guastatoya |
| 84 | 2017 Apertura | Antigua | Municipal |
| 85 | 2018 Clausura | Guastatoya | Xelajú |
| 86 | 2018 Apertura | Guastatoya | Comunicaciones |
| 87 | 2019 Clausura | Antigua | Malacateco |
| 88 | 2019 Apertura | Municipal | Antigua |
| 89 | 2020 Clausura | Canceled due to the COVID-19 pandemic | |
| 90 | 2020 Apertura | Guastatoya | Municipal |
| 91 | 2021 Clausura | Santa Lucía | Comunicaciones |
| 92 | 2021 Apertura | Malacateco | Comunicaciones |
| 93 | 2022 Clausura | Comunicaciones | Municipal |
| 94 | 2022 Apertura | Cobán Imperial | Antigua |
| 95 | 2023 Clausura | Xelajú | Antigua |
| 96 | 2023 Apertura | Comunicaciones | Guastatoya |
| 97 | 2024 Clausura | Municipal | Mixco |
| 98 | 2024 Apertura | Xelajú | Cobán Imperial |
| 99 | 2025 Clausura | Antigua | Municipal |
| 100 | 2025 Apertura | Antigua | Municipal |
| 101 | 2026 Clausura | Municipal | Xelajú |

== Titles by club in Guatemalan Football History ==
Champions were: Amateur and Professional Champions.

=== Amateur Era ===
| Club | Winners | Runners-up | Winning years |
|---|---|---|---|
| USAC | 6 | 1 | 1924, 1926, 1928, 1929, 1930, 1931 |
| Tipografia Nacional | 3 | 5 | 1938, 1939, 1940 |
| Hércules | 2 | 4 | 1920, 1927 |
| Allies | 2 | 3 | 1919, 1922 |
| Cibeles | 2 | 0 | 1935, 1936 |
| Escuela Politécnica | 2 | 0 | 1933, 1934 |
| Guatemala FC | 2 | 0 | 1932, 1941 |
| La Joya | 2 | 0 | 1923, 1925 |
| Quetzal | 1 | 2 | 1937 |

=== Professional Era ===
| Club | Winners | Runners-up | Winning years |
|---|---|---|---|
| Municipal | 33 | 26 | 1942–43, 1947, 1950–51, 1954–55, 1963–64, 1965–66, 1969–70, 1973, 1974, 1976, 1987, 1988–89, 1989–90, 1991–92, 1993–94, 2000 Clausura, 2000 Apertura, 2001 Reordenamiento, 2002 Clausura, 2003 Apertura, 2004 Apertura, 2005 Clausura, 2005 Apertura, 2006 Clausura, 2006 Apertura, 2008 Clausura, 2009 Apertura, 2010 Clausura, 2011 Apertura, 2017 Clausura, 2019 Apertura, 2024 Clausura, 2026 Clausura |
| Comunicaciones | 32 | 26 | 1956, 1957–58, 1959–60, 1968–69, 1970–71, 1971, 1972, 1977–78, 1979–80, 1981, 1982, 1985, 1990–91, 1994–95, 1996–97, 1997–98, 1998–99, 1999 Apertura, 2001 Clausura, 2002 Apertura, 2003 Clausura, 2008 Apertura, 2010 Apertura, 2011 Clausura, 2012 Apertura, 2013 Clausura, 2013 Apertura, 2014 Clausura, 2014 Apertura, 2015 Clausura, 2022 Clausura, 2023 Apertura |
| Aurora | 8 | 10 | 1964, 1966, 1967–68, 1975, 1978, 1984, 1986, 1992–93 |
| Xelajú | 7 | 7 | 1961–62, 1980, 1995–96, 2007 Clausura, 2012 Clausura, 2023 Clausura, 2024 Apertura |
| Antigua | 6 | 4 | Apertura 2015, Apertura 2016, Apertura 2017, Clausura 2019, Clausura 2025, Apertura 2025 |
| Guastatoya | 3 | 3 | Clausura 2018, Apertura 2018, Apertura 2020 |
| Tipografía Nacional | 3 | 1 | 1943, 1944–45, 1952–53 |
| Suchitepéquez | 2 | 5 | 1983, 2016 Clausura |
| Cobán Imperial | 2 | 4 | 2004 Clausura, 2022 Apertura |
| Jalapa | 2 | 0 | 2007 Apertura, 2009 Clausura |
| Malacateco | 1 | 1 | 2021 Apertura |
| Santa Lucía | 1 | 0 | 2021 Clausura |

== Top goalscorers ==
| Nr. | Player | Country | Goals |
|---|---|---|---|
| 1 | Juan Carlos Plata | (Guatemala) | 302 |
| 2 | Oscar Sánchez | (Guatemala) | 259 |
| 3 | Julio César Anderson | (Guatemala) | 220 |
| 4 | Carlos Kamiani Félix | (Mexico) | 211 |
| 5 | Edwin Westphal | (Guatemala) | 188 |
| 6 | Israel Silva | (Brazil) | 186 |
| 7 | René Morales | (Guatemala) | 172 |
| 8 | Mario Acevedo | (Guatemala) | 170 |
| 9 | Agustín Herrera | (Mexico) | 161 |
| 10 | Selvin Pennant | (Guatemala) | 156 |
| 11 | León Ugarte | (Argentina) | 156 |
| 12 | Edgar Araiza | (Guatemala) | 150 |
| 13 | Fredy García | (Guatemala) | 144 |
| 14 | Hugo Peña | (Guatemala) | 136 |
| 15 | Rolando Fonseca | (Costa Rica) | 135 |
| 16 | Rudy Ramírez | (Guatemala) | 130 |
| 17 | Carlos Toledo | (Guatemala) | 129 |
| 18 | Jhonny Cubero | (Costa Rica) | 124 |
| 19 | Julio Rodas | (Guatemala) | 123 |
| 20 | José Emilio Mitrovich | (Argentina) | 121 |

== Sponsors ==
- Bantrab
- Molten
- Tigo
- Claro
- Betcris
- Gana777
- Zeta Gas
- Forza Delivery
- Hielo Fiesta
- Gatorade
- Pepsi
- Sportline
- GNC
- Camas Olympia
- Vitalmed
- Café Quetzal

=== Sponsorship names ===
- Liga Guate Banrural (2023–2026)
- Liga Bantrab (2026–)

== See also ==
- Football in Guatemala – overview of football sport
- List of attendance at sports leagues
- List of foreign Liga Guate players
- Liga Nacional Femenina
