= Santa Lucía Stadium =

Stadium in Malacatán, Guatemala

Coordinates: 14°54′43″N 92°03′36″W

Estadio Santa Lucía
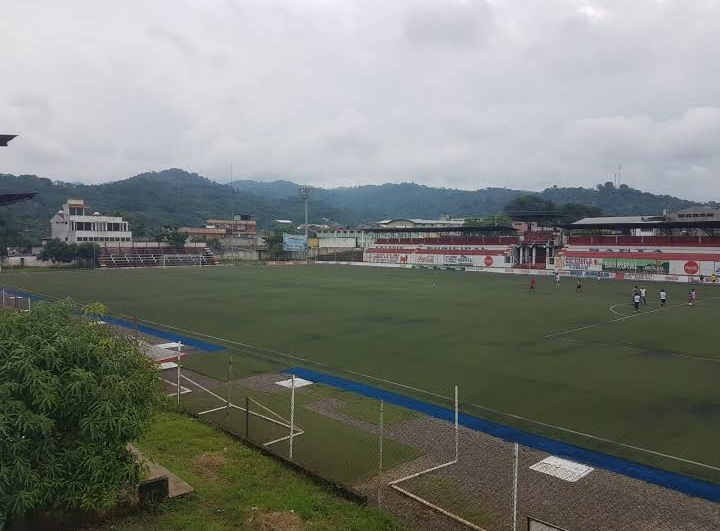
- Interactive map of Estadio Santa Lucía
- Location: Malacatán, Guatemala
- Owner: Municipality of Malacatán
- Capacity: 8,000
- Surface: AstroTurf
- Record attendance: 9,000 (Malacateco vs. Comunicaciones, 31 December 2021)
- Field size: 104 m × 68 m (341 ft × 223 ft)

Construction
- Opened: 1968
- Renovated: 2009, 2015

Tenants
- Malacateco (1968–present); Guatemala national football team (selected matches)

The Santa Lucía Stadium (Spanish: Estadio Santa Lucía) is a football stadium located in Malacatán, Guatemala. It is home to Liga Bantrab club Malacateco. It holds a capacity of 8,000 spectators.

== See also ==
- Lists of stadiums
