= 2023–24 Liga Guate =

71st professional season of the top-flight football league in Guatemala

Liga Guate
- Season: 2023–24
- Dates: 28 July 2023 – 19 May 2024
- Champions: Apertura: Comunicaciones (32nd title); Clausura: Municipal (32nd title)
- Relegated: Zacapa; Coatepeque
- CONCACAF Central American Cup: Comunicaciones; Municipal; Antigua
- Matches: 220
- Goals: 543 (2.47 per match)
- Top goalscorer: Apertura: José Carlos Martínez (9 goals); Clausura: Diego Casas (9 goals)
- Highest attendance: Apertura: 20,000; Comunicaciones 1–0 Guastatoya (23 December 2023)
- Stats are from the regular season only Attendance does not include matches played behind closed doors.

The 2023–24 Liga Guate, also known as Liga Guate Banrural for sponsorship reasons, was the 71st professional season of the top-flight football league in Guatemala. The season was divided into two championships—the 2023 Apertura and the 2024 Clausura—each in an identical format and each contested by the same 12 teams.

== Competition format ==
Same as previous years, the season was divided into two short tournaments: Torneo Apertura (opening) and Torneo Clausura (closing), each of which crowning its own champion. In May 2023, President of the Liga Nacional Rodolfo Puertas announced a change in the competition format for the 2023–24 season in order to reduce the number of games to be played, adopting one similar to that implemented in the 2020–21 season during the COVID-19 pandemic. The new format was approved on 13 June 2023 during the Ordinary Assembly of the Liga Nacional with the Apertura and Clausura tournaments being played under the same format consisting of a Classification phase, which was now played with two groups of 6 teams, and a Final phase, which remained unchanged.

The classification phase consisted of two groups of 6 teams each, which were formed based on the position of the teams in the cumulative table of the previous season, with the teams placed in odd position plus one promoted team in group A and the teams placed in even position plus the other promoted team in group B:

Group A
Pos	Team
1	Comunicaciones
3	Xelajú
5	Cobán Imperial
7	Xinabajul-Huehue
9	Malacateco
Prom	Coatepeque

Group B
Pos	Team
2	Municipal
4	Antigua
6	Guastatoya
8	Achuapa
10	Mixco
Prom	Zacapa

Each team played twice against the opponents in their group on a home-and-away round-robin basis, but also played once against the 6 teams in the opposing group (intergroup matches) for a total of 16 matches per team. The top eight teams in an overall table at the conclusion of the classification stage advanced to the quarter-finals of the final stage.

The final phase was played on a single-elimination format and consisted of the quarter-finals, semi-finals and the finals. All rounds were played on a home-and-away two-legged basis, with the higher-ranked team in the classification phase of each tie hosting the second leg. The quarter-final pairings were pre-determined based on the teams' final position in the classification phase. In the semi-finals the teams were re-seeded based also on their final position in the classification phase in order to determine the two pairings. The quarter-finals and semi-finals matchups were determined as follows:

Quarter-finals

- Match A: Third placed team vs. Sixth placed team
- Match B: Fourth placed team vs. Fifth placed team
- Match C: First placed team vs. Eighth placed team
- Match D: Second placed team vs. Seventh placed team

Semi-finals

- Match I: Second best placed semi-finalist vs. Third best placed semi-finalist
- Match II: Top-placed semi-finalist vs. Fourth best placed semi-finalist

Both champions of the Apertura and Clausura tournaments plus the best placed team on the aggregate table (excluding the two champions) at the end of the season qualified for the 2024 CONCACAF Central American Cup.

== Teams ==
Location of the 2023-24 Liga Nacional de Fútbol de Guatemala teams
Location of teams in Guatemala Department

=== Promotion and relegation (pre-season) ===
A total of 12 teams took part in this season: the top ten teams from the aggregate table of the 2022–23 season as well as the two promoted teams from the 2022–23 Primera División season, Coatepeque and Zacapa. Both teams were promoted as finalists in both the Apertura and Clausura tournaments of the 2022–23 Primera División,

Teams relegated to Primera División de Ascenso

The two promoted teams replaced Santa Lucía and Iztapa, the bottom two teams in the aggregate table of the 2022–23 season, who were relegated to Primera División in the previous season.

=== Stadiums and locations ===
Team	City	Stadium	Capacity
Achuapa	El Progreso	Winston Pineda	6,000
Antigua	Antigua Guatemala	Pensativo	10,000
Coatepeque	Coatepeque	Israel Barrios	20,000
Cobán Imperial	Cobán	Verapaz	15,000
Comunicaciones	Guatemala City	Doroteo Guamuch Flores	26,000
Guastatoya	Guastatoya	David Cordón Hichos	3,100
Malacateco	Malacatán	Santa Lucía	7,000
Mixco	Mixco	Santo Domingo de Guzmán	5,200
Municipal	Guatemala City	El Trébol	7,500
Xelajú	Quetzaltenango	Mario Camposeco	11,220
Xinabajul-Huehue	Huehuetenango	Los Cuchumatanes	5,340
Zacapa	Zacapa	David Ordoñez Bardales	8,500

=== Personnel and kits ===
Team	Head coach	Captain	Kit manufacturer	Shirt sponsor(s)
Achuapa	(Costa Rica) Rónald Gómez	(Guatemala) Rigoberto Hernández	Guza−Sport	
Antigua	(Guatemala) Dwight Pezzarossi	(Costa Rica) José Mena	Nino	
Coatepeque	(Uruguay) Silvio Fernández	(Guatemala) Pedro Samayoa	Nevimar	
Cobán Imperial	(Mexico) Adrián García Arias	(Brazil) Janderson	MG Sports	
Comunicaciones	(Uruguay) William Coito	(Guatemala) José Manuel Contreras	Kelme	
Guastatoya	(Mexico) Roberto Montoya	(Guatemala) Rubén Morales	Guza−Sport	
Malacateco	(Argentina) Gabriel Pereyra	(Guatemala) Jorge Sánchez	Silver Sport	
Mixco	(Guatemala) Fabricio Benítez	(Guatemala) Jean Márquez	JM12	
Municipal	(Argentina) Sebastián Bini	(Guatemala) Marlon Sequén	Umbro	
Xelajú	(Guatemala) Amarini Villatoro	(Costa Rica) Kenner Gutiérrez	Kelme	
Xinabajul-Huehue	(Argentina) Pablo Centrone	(Guatemala) Kristian Guzmán	Orion	
Zacapa	(Brazil) Gerson Voss	(Guatemala) Mafre Icuté	Guza−Sport	

=== Managerial changes ===
Team	Outgoing manager	Manner of departure	Date of vacancy	Position in table	Incoming manager	Date of appointment
Torneo Apertura
Achuapa	(Guatemala) Walter Claverí	End of contract	7 May 2023	Pre-season	(Argentina) Gabriel Pereyra	25 May 2023
Achuapa	(Guatemala) Hamilton López	End of caretaker spell	14 May 2023	Pre-season	(Mexico) Adrián García Arias	31 May 2023
Municipal	(Paraguay) José Cardozo	End of contract	15 May 2023	Pre-season	(Argentina) Sebastián Bini	29 May 2023
Antigua	(Argentina) Ramiro Cepeda	End of contract	29 May 2023	Pre-season	(Costa Rica) Ronald González	1 June 2023
Guastatoya	(Nicaragua) Mario Acevedo	End of contract	2 June 2023	Pre-season	(Mexico) Roberto Montoya	2 June 2023
Zacapa	(Guatemala) Erick González	Mutual agreement	19 September 2023	8th	(Uruguay) Martín García	23 September 2023
Antigua	(Costa Rica) Ronald González	Sacked	22 September 2023	2nd	(Guatemala) Dwight Pezzarossi (Note: Originally as caretaker manager, appointed on a permanent basis on 2 October 2023.)	22 September 2023
Coatepeque	(Guatemala) Joaquín Álvarez	Mutual agreement	4 October 2023	11th	(Mexico) Paco Ramírez	5 October 2023
Torneo Clausura
Cobán Imperial	(Uruguay) César Méndez	Sacked	28 November 2023	Pre-tournament	(Mexico) Adrián García Arias	9 December 2023
Coatepeque	(Mexico) Paco Ramírez	Mutual agreement	29 November 2023	Pre-tournament	(Uruguay) Silvio Fernández	December 2023
Achuapa	(Mexico) Adrián García Arias	Signed by Cobán Imperial	9 December 2023	Pre-tournament	(Colombia) Milton García	29 December 2023
Zacapa	(Uruguay) Martín García	Mutual agreement	21 December 2023	Pre-tournament	(Uruguay) Adrián Fernández	22 December 2023
Comunicaciones	(Uruguay) William Coito	Mutual agreement	26 December 2023	Pre-tournament	(Argentina) Iván Sopegno	27 December 2023
Zacapa	(Uruguay) Adrián Fernández	Mutual agreement	17 February 2024	11th	(Argentina) Héctor Vargas	17 February 2024
Achuapa	(Colombia) Milton García	Sacked	1 March 2024	9th	(Costa Rica) Rónald Gómez (Note: José Villalobos was the caretaker manager for the Torneo Clausura 9th round match against Guastatoya on 3 March 2024.)	5 March 2024
Zacapa	(Argentina) Héctor Vargas	Mutual agreement	11 March 2024	11th	(Guatemala) Julio Laínez	11 March 2024
Zacapa	(Guatemala) Julio Laínez	Sacked	4 April 2024	12th	(Brazil) Gerson Voss	4 April 2024
Comunicaciones	(Argentina) Iván Sopegno	Demoted to the youth levels	18 April 2024	5th	(Uruguay) William Coito	19 April 2024

== Apertura ==
The Apertura 2023 tournament began on 28 July and ended on 23 December 2023. Xelajú were the defending champions, having won the Clausura 2023 tournament at the previous season.

=== Classification phase – Apertura 2023 ===
The classification phase of the Apertura tournament ran from 28 July to 12 November 2023.

==== Standings ====
Pos	Team	Pld	W	D	L	GF	GA	GD	Pts	Qualification
1	Achuapa	16	9	3	4	27	23	+4	30	Advance to Quarter-finals
2	Municipal	16	8	4	4	27	17	+10	28	Advance to Quarter-finals
3	Antigua	16	8	4	4	24	19	+5	28	Advance to Quarter-finals
4	Comunicaciones	16	7	5	4	27	20	+7	26	Advance to Quarter-finals
5	Malacateco	16	7	3	6	24	24	0	24	Advance to Quarter-finals
6	Guastatoya	16	7	2	7	21	16	+5	23	Advance to Quarter-finals
7	Zacapa	16	7	1	8	22	20	+2	22	Advance to Quarter-finals
8	Xelajú	16	5	4	7	10	13	−3	19	Advance to Quarter-finals
9	Mixco	16	5	4	7	15	20	−5	19	
10	Cobán Imperial	16	4	6	6	19	25	−6	18	
11	Xinabajul-Huehue	16	3	7	6	18	25	−7	16	
12	Coatepeque	16	2	5	9	12	24	−12	11	

Source: Guatfutbol, Soccerway Clausura
Rules for classification: 1) Points; 2) Goal difference; 3) Goals for; 4) Away goals for; 5) Matches won; 6) Away matches won; 7) Head-to-head results; 8) Fair play points; 9) Drawing of lots.

==== Results ====
The match schedule was decided based on the draw which took place during the Ordinary Assembly of the Liga Nacional held on 13 June 2023.

Home \ Away	ACH	ANT	COA	COB	COM	GUA	MAL	MIX	MUN	XEL	XIN	ZAC
Achuapa	—	3–2	1–0	—	2–0	2–0	—	2–0	2–2	1–0	—	3–1
Antigua	3–0	—	—	2–2	—	1–0	4–2	2–2	0–2	—	2–1	3–2
Coatepeque	—	0–0	—	3–0	0–2	0–1	0–2	—	—	0–0	4–1	0–1
Cobán Imperial	1–1	—	2–1	—	2–1	—	1–3	2–2	2–2	1–0	2–0	—
Comunicaciones	—	2–1	5–0	2–0	—	2–1	1–1	—	—	2–1	1–1	2–2
Guastatoya	1–2	2–2	—	1–0	—	—	4–0	2–1	3–1	—	0–0	0–1
Malacateco	3–2	—	1–0	0–0	2–3	—	—	3–0	1–1	2–0	3–1	—
Mixco	2–0	0–1	3–0	—	2–1	1–0	—	—	0–3	0–0	—	1–0
Municipal	2–2	0–1	3–0	—	0–2	0–1	—	1–0	—	1–0	—	4–2
Xelajú	—	0–1	1–1	1–0	2–0	2–1	1–0	—	—	—	1–1	1–0
Xinabajul-Huehue	1–2	—	2–2	3–3	2–2	—	2–1	0–0	0–2	2–0	—	—
Zacapa	2–3	3–1	—	3–1	—	2–1	4–0	1–0	0–1	—	0–1	—

Source: Guatefutbol, Soccerway
Legend: Blue = home team win; Yellow = draw; Red = away team win.

==== Top goalscorers ====
Players sorted first by goals scored, then by last name. José Carlos Martínez won the Torneo Apertura top scorer award (known as Juan Carlos Plata Trophy) after scoring 9 goals for Municipal. (Note: Goals scored during the final phase are not included as the tournament top scorer award only takes into account goals scored in the classification phase.)

Rank	Player	Club	Goals
1	(Guatemala) José Carlos Martínez	Municipal	9
2	(Guatemala) Dewinder Bradley	Antigua	8
2	(Colombia) Elíser Quiñones	Achuapa	8
4	(Paraguay) Pedro Báez	Malacateco	7
4	(Guatemala) Luis Túnchez	Achuapa	7
6	(Costa Rica) Keyshwen Arboine	Comunicaciones	5
6	(Guatemala) José Espinoza	Zacapa	5
6	(Guatemala) Lynner García	Comunicaciones	5
6	(Guatemala) Esteban García	Mixco	5
6	(Guatemala) Erick Lemus	Achuapa	5
6	(Uruguay) Gabriel Leyes	Muncicipal	5
6	(Mexico) Ángel López	Malacateco	5
6	(Guatemala) Yonathan Morán	Malacateco	5
6	(Argentina) Matías Rotondi	Municipal	5

Source: Soccerway, Guatefutbol

=== Final phase – Apertura 2023 ===
The final phase of the Apertura tournament ran from 29 November to 23 December 2023.

==== Bracket ====
Quarter-finals
7	Zacapa	1	2	3
2	Municipal	0	1	1
6	Guastatoya	2	0	2
3	Antigua	0	0	0
8	Xelajú	3	3	6
1	Achuapa	1	1	2
5	Malacateco	2	0	2
4	Comunicaciones	0	5	5

Semi-finals
7	Zacapa	1	1	2
6	Guastatoya	1	3	4
8	Xelajú	2	0	2 (2)
4	Comunicaciones (p)	2	0	2 (4)

Finals
6	Guastatoya	1	0	1
4	Comunicaciones	1	1	2

==== Quarter-finals ====
29 November 2023
15:00

Guastatoya	2–0	Antigua
Domínguez 64'; Estrada 85'	Report; Referee report

Estadio David Cordón Hichos, Guastatoya
Attendance: 2,000
Referee: Wildomar Ramírez
2 December 2023
19:00

Antigua	0–0	Guastatoya
	Report; Referee report

Estadio Pensativo, Antigua Guatemala
Attendance: 7,000
Referee: Julio Luna

Guastatoya won 2–0 on aggregate and advanced to the semi-finals.

29 November 2023
19:00

Malacateco	2–0	Comunicaciones
Morán 56'; López 72'	Report; Referee report

Estadio Santa Lucía, Malacatán
Attendance: 8,000
Referee: Kevyn Cacao
2 December 2023
16:00

Comunicaciones	5–0	Malacateco
Anangonó 27', 34', 45+3', 55'; Rivera 77'	Report; Referee report

Estadio Carlos Salazar Hijo, Mazatenango (Note: Comunicaciones played their home match at Estadio Carlos Salazar Hijo, Mazatenango instead of their regular stadium Estadio Doroteo Guamuch Flores, Guatemala City which was occupied for a match of Guatemala for the 2024 CONCACAF W Gold Cup qualification on 3 December 2023.)
Attendance: 6,000
Referee: Mario Escobar

Comunicaciones won 5–2 on aggregate and advanced to the semi-finals.

30 November 2023
20:00

Xelajú	3–1	Achuapa
Vargas 9'; Tinoco 24'; Cardoza 42'	Report; Referee report	Osorio 88'

Estadio Mario Camposeco, Quetzaltenango
Attendance: 11,220
Referee: Luis Escobar
3 December 2023
14:00

Achuapa	1–3	Xelajú
Quiñones 81'	Report; Referee report	Gutiérrez 26' (pen.); Rentería 62'; Lom 90+2'

Estadio Winston Pineda, Jutiapa
Attendance: 5,000
Referee: Walter López

Xelajú won 6–2 on aggregate and advanced to the semi-finals.

30 November 2023
15:00

Zacapa	1–0	Municipal
Espinoza 47'	Report; Referee report

Estadio David Ordoñez Bardales, Zacapa
Attendance: 4,000
Referee: Diego Ojer
3 December 2023
11:00

Municipal	1–2	Zacapa
Méndez 24'	Report; Referee report	Espinoza 63'; Zamora 74'

Estadio El Trébol, Guatemala City
Attendance: 8,000
Referee: Bryan López

Zacapa won 3–1 on aggregate and advanced to the semi-finals.

==== Semi-finals ====
6 December 2023
19:00

Zacapa	1–1	Guastatoya
Arboine 47'	Report; Referee report	Domínguez 4'

Estadio David Ordoñez Bardales, Zacapa
Attendance: 8,500
Referee: Luis Escobar
9 December 2023
15:00

Guastatoya	3–1	Zacapa
Morán 34', 76' (pen.); Ferreira 51'	Report; Referee report	Espinoza 9'

Estadio David Cordón Hichos, Guastatoya
Attendance: 3,100
Referee: Mario Escobar

Zacapa won 4–2 on aggregate and advanced to the finals.

7 December 2023
20:30

Xelajú	2–2	Comunicaciones
Moreira 9'; Rodas 65'	Report; Referee report	Anangonó 4'; Aguilar 71'

Estadio Mario Camposeco, Quetzaltenango
Attendance: 11,220
Referee: Kevyn Cacao
10 December 2023
19:00

Comunicaciones	0–0 (a.e.t.)	Xelajú
	Report; Referee report
Penalties
Contreras (penalty scored); Espino (penalty scored); Fracchia (penalty scored); Anangonó (penalty missed); Pinto (penalty scored)	4–2	(penalty scored) Gutiérrez; (penalty missed) Santos; (penalty missed) Lemus; (penalty scored) Vargas

Estadio Doroteo Guamuch Flores, Guatemala City
Attendance: 18,000
Referee: Walter López

Tied 2–2 on aggregate, Comunicaciones won on penalties and advanced to the finals.

==== Finals ====
17 December 2023
15:00

Guastatoya	1–1	Comunicaciones
Morán 40'	Report; Referee report	López 15'

Estadio David Cordón Hichos, Guastatoya
Attendance: 3,100
Referee: Walter López
23 December 2023
18:00

Comunicaciones	1–0	Guastatoya
Cardozo 64'	Report; Referee report

Estadio Doroteo Guamuch Flores, Guatemala City
Attendance: 20,000
Referee: Mario Escobar

Comunicaciones won 2–1 on aggregate. As Torneo Apertura champions they qualified for the 2024 CONCACAF Central American Cup.

== Clausura ==
The Clausura 2024 tournament began on 19 January and ended on 19 May 2024. The defending champions were Comunicaciones, who had won the previous Apertura 2023 tournament.

=== Classification phase – Clausura 2024 ===
The classification phase of the Apertura tournament ran from 19 January to 21 April 2024.

==== Standings ====
Pos	Team	Pld	W	D	L	GF	GA	GD	Pts	Qualification
1	Municipal	16	10	2	4	29	14	+15	32	Advance to Quarter-finals
2	Antigua	16	10	2	4	25	12	+13	32	Advance to Quarter-finals
3	Mixco	16	8	3	5	18	10	+8	27	Advance to Quarter-finals
4	Cobán Imperial	16	7	6	3	29	22	+7	27	Advance to Quarter-finals
5	Comunicaciones	16	6	5	5	16	17	−1	23	Advance to Quarter-finals
6	Achuapa	16	7	1	8	17	20	−3	22	Advance to Quarter-finals
7	Xinabajul-Huehue	16	5	6	5	19	19	0	21	Advance to Quarter-finals
8	Malacateco	16	6	3	7	21	26	−5	21	Advance to Quarter-finals
9	Xelajú	16	5	5	6	14	15	−1	20	
10	Guastatoya	16	4	6	6	21	23	−2	18	
11	Zacapa	16	2	5	9	12	25	−13	11	
12	Coatepeque	16	3	2	11	13	31	−18	11	

Source: Guatfutbol, Soccerway Clausura
Rules for classification: 1) Points; 2) Goal difference; 3) Goals for.

==== Results ====
The match schedule was the same as the one drawn for the Torneo Apertura (with the order of the intergroup matches reversed).

Home \ Away	ACH	ANT	COA	COB	COM	GUA	MAL	MIX	MUN	XEL	XIN	ZAC
Achuapa	—	0–2	—	1–2	—	0–1	2–0	1–0	2–0	—	2–0	2–1
Antigua	2–0	—	4–0	—	3–0	3–0	—	2–0	1–0	1–0	—	1–0
Coatepeque	1–0	—	—	1–3	0–1	—	1–2	2–1	0–4	2–1	1–1	—
Cobán Imperial	—	1–1	3–1	—	3–0	3–3	4–2	—	—	3–0	2–5	1–0
Comunicaciones	1–3	—	2–0	1–1	—	—	4–2	0–1	0–0	0–0	3–0	—
Guastatoya	1–1	2–1	0–0	—	2–0	—	—	0–0	0–1	1–1	—	6–0
Malacateco	—	2–2	3–2	3–0	0–1	1–0	—	—	—	1–0	1–1	2–1
Mixco	1–0	2–0	—	0–0	—	2–1	0–0	—	3–1	—	2–0	3–1
Municipal	4–1	3–1	—	2–1	—	5–1	3–0	0–3	—	—	1–0	3–1
Xelajú	4–1	—	2–1	0–0	0–1	—	2–1	1–0	0–2	—	2–0	—
Xinabajul-Huehue	—	2–0	2–1	2–2	0–0	3–1	3–1	—	—	0–0	—	0–0
Zacapa	0–1	0–1	2–0	—	2–2	2–2	—	1–0	0–0	1–1	—	—

Source: Guatefutbol, Soccerway
Legend: Blue = home team win; Yellow = draw; Red = away team win.

==== Top goalscorers ====
Players sorted first by goals scored, then by last name. Diego Casas (1,129 minutes played) and Matías Rotondi (1,292 minutes played) tied in goals scored with 9 goals each. Diego Casas won the Clausura 2024 goal scorer's award (known as Juan Carlos Plata Trophy) for having played fewer minutes.

Rank	Player	Club	Goals
1	(Uruguay) Diego Casas	Cobán Imperial	9
1	(Argentina) Matías Rotondi	Municipal	9
3	(Guatemala) Erick Lemus	Achuapa	5
3	(Mexico) Ángel López	Malacateco	5
3	(Argentina) Nicolás Mazzola	Xinabajul-Huehue	5
3	(Argentina) Jonatan Morán	Xelajú	5
3	(Argentina) Tomás Pizarro	Xinabajul-Huehue	5
8	(Ecuador) Juan Luis Anangonó	Comunicaciones	4
8	(Costa Rica) Keyshwen Arboine	Zacapa	4
8	(Paraguay) Víctor Avalos	Coatepeque	4
8	(Paraguay) Pedro Báez	Malacateco	4
8	(Guatemala) Robin Betancourth	Guastatoya	4
8	(Guatemala) Edwin Bol Coc	Cobán Imperial	4
8	(Guatemala) Dewinder Bradley	Antigua	4
8	(Paraguay) Roque Caballero	Mixco	4
8	(Brazil) Romario Luiz Da Silva	Antigua	4
8	(Guatemala) Denilson Ochaeta	Coatepeque	4
8	(Colombia) Elíser Quiñones	Achuapa	4
8	(Mexico) Óscar Villa	Guastatoya	4

Source: Guatefutbol

=== Final phase – Clausura 2024 ===
The final phase of the Clausura tournament ran from 24 April to 19 May 2024.

==== Bracket ====
Quarter-finals
6	Achuapa	0	1	1
3	Mixco	2	2	4
7	Xinabajul-Huehue	2	0	2
2	Antigua	0	0	0
5	Comunicaciones	1	2	3
4	Cobán Imperial	0	0	0
8	Malacateco	2	0	2
1	Municipal	0	5	5

Semi-finals
3	Mixco (p)	1	0	1 (4)
2	Antigua	0	1	1 (2)
5	Comunicaciones	0	0	0
1	Municipal	0	3	3

Finals
3	Mixco	0	0	0
1	Municipal	0	2	2

==== Quarter-finals ====
24 April 2024
15:00

Achuapa	0–2	Mixco
	Report; Referee report	Lom 12'; Caballero 45'

Estadio Winston Pineda, Jutiapa
Attendance: 3,000
Referee: Diego Ojer
27 April 2024
15:00

Mixco	2–1	Achuapa
Pozuelos 27', 38'	Report; Referee report	Lemus 59'

Estadio Santo Domingo de Guzmán, Mixco
Attendance: 5,200
Referee: Julio Luna

Mixco won 4–1 on aggregate and advanced to the semi-finals.

24 April 2024
20:00

Comunicaciones	1–0	Cobán Imperial
Anangonó 14'	Report; Referee report

Estadio Cementos Progreso, Guatemala City
Attendance: 10,000
Referee: Luis Escobar
27 April 2024
12:00

Cobán Imperial	0–2	Comunicaciones
	Report; Referee report	Anangonó 49'; López 87'

Estadio Verapaz, Cobán
Attendance: 9,000
Referee: Sergio Reyna

Comunicaciones won 3–0 on aggregate and advanced to the semi-finals.

25 April 2024
18:00

Malacateco	3–2	Municipal
Báez 9'; López 48'; Fariña 12' (o.g.)	Report; Referee report	Archila 83'; Martínez 89'

Estadio Santa Lucía, Malacatán
Attendance: 7,000
Referee: Cristhofer Corado
28 April 2024
14:30

Municipal	4–0	Malacateco
Rocca 5', 57'; Martínez 10', 27'	Report; Referee report

Estadio El Trébol, Guatemala City
Attendance: 8,000
Referee: Mario Escobar

Municipal won 6–3 on aggregate and advanced to the semi-finals.

25 April 2024
20:15

Xinabajul-Huehue	0–1	Antigua
	Report; Referee report	Ardón 77'

Estadio Los Cuchumatanes, Huehuetenango
Attendance: 5,340
Referee: Ignacio Fuentes
28 April 2024
18:00

Antigua	2–1	Xinabajul-Huehue
Da Silva 20', 56'	Report; Referee report	Pizarro 68'

Estadio Pensativo, Antigua Guatemala
Attendance: 6,000
Referee: Walter López

Antigua won 3–1 on aggregate and advanced to the semi-finals.

==== Semi-finals ====
1 May 2024
15:00

Mixco	1–0	Antigua
Caballero 42'	Report; Referee report

Estadio Santo Domingo de Guzmán, Mixco
Attendance: 5,200
Referee: Cristhofer Corado
4 May 2024
20:00

Antigua	1–0 (a.e.t.)	Mixco
Gálvez 55'	Report; Referee report
Penalties
C. A. Hernández (penalty missed); Bradley (penalty missed); Da Silva (penalty scored); Ardón (penalty scored)	2–4	(penalty scored) Cavallo; (penalty scored) Hernández; (penalty scored) Urizar; (penalty missed) Yanes; (penalty scored) Pozuelos

Estadio Pensativo, Antigua Guatemala
Attendance: 10,000
Referee: Julio Luna

Tied 1–1 on aggregate, Antigua won on penalties and advanced to the finals.

2 May 2024
20:00

Comunicaciones	0–0	Municipal
	Report; Referee report

Estadio Cementos Progreso, Guatemala City
Attendance: 16,000
Referee: Sergio Reyna
5 May 2024
14:30

Municipal	3–0	Comunicaciones
Rocca 10'; Martínez 46'; Altán 87'	Report; Referee report

Estadio El Trébol, Guatemala City
Attendance: 8,000
Referee: Walter López

Municipal won 3–0 on aggregate and advanced to the finals.

==== Finals ====
11 May 2024
15:00

Mixco	0–0	Municipal
	Report; Referee report

Estadio Santo Domingo de Guzmán, Mixco
Attendance: 5,200
Referee: Sergio Reyna
19 May 2024
14:30

Municipal	2–0	Mixco
Martínez 59'; Rotondi 83'	Report; Referee report

Estadio El Trébol, Guatemala City
Attendance: 8,000
Referee: Walter López

Municipal won 2–0 on aggregate. As Torneo Clausura champions they qualified for the 2025 CONCACAF Central American Cup.

== Aggregate table ==
The aggregate table was used to determine the third qualified team for the 2024 CONCACAF Central American Cup, besides the Apertura and Clausura champions, and the two relegated teams to the 2024–25 Primera División.

Pos	Team	Pld	W	D	L	GF	GA	GD	Pts	Qualification
1	Municipal (C)	32	18	6	8	56	31	+25	60	Qualification for the CONCACAF Central American Cup
2	Antigua	32	18	6	8	49	31	+18	60	Qualification for the CONCACAF Central American Cup
3	Achuapa	32	16	4	12	44	43	+1	52	
4	Comunicaciones (C)	32	13	10	9	43	37	+6	49	Qualification for the CONCACAF Central American Cup
5	Mixco	32	13	7	12	33	30	+3	46	
6	Cobán Imperial	32	11	12	9	49	48	+1	45	
7	Malacateco	32	13	6	13	45	50	−5	45	
8	Guastatoya	32	11	8	13	42	39	+3	41	
9	Xelajú	32	10	9	13	24	28	−4	39	
10	Xinabajul-Huehue	32	8	13	11	37	44	−7	37	
11	Zacapa (R)	32	9	6	17	34	45	−11	33	Relegation to Primera División
12	Coatepeque (R)	32	5	7	20	26	56	−30	22	Relegation to Primera División

Source: Liga Nacional
Rules for classification: 1) Points; 2) Goal difference; 3) Goals for; 4) Away goals for; 5) Matches won; 6) Away matches won; 7) Head-to-head results; 8) Fair play points; 9) Drawing of lots.
(C) Champions; (R) Relegated
