= 2022–23 Liga Guate =

70th professional season of the top-flight football league in Guatemala

Liga Guate
- Season: 2022–23
- Dates: 23 July 2022 – 27 May 2023
- Champions: Apertura: Cobán Imperial (2nd title); Clausura: Xelajú (6th title)
- Relegated: Iztapa; Santa Lucía
- CONCACAF Central American Cup: Cobán Imperial; Xelajú; Comunicaciones
- Top goalscorer: Apertura: Lucas Gómez (12 goals); Clausura: Matías Rotondi (14 goals)

The 2022–23 Liga Guate, also known as Liga Guate Banrural for sponsorship reasons, was the 70th professional season of the top-flight football league in Guatemala. The season was divided into two championships—the 2022 Apertura and the 2023 Clausura—each in an identical format and each contested by the same 12 teams.

== Competition format ==
Same as previous years, the season was divided into two short tournaments: Torneo Apertura (opening) and Torneo Clausura (closing), each of which crowning its own champion. Both Apertura and Clausura tournaments were played under the same format which consisted in a Classification phase and a Final phase.

In the classification phase, teams played each other twice on a home-and-away round-robin basis. The top eight teams at the conclusion of the classification stage advanced to the quarter-finals of the final stage.

The final phase was played on a single-elimination format and consisted of the quarter-finals, semi-finals and the finals. All rounds were played on a home-and-away two-legged basis, with the higher-ranked team in the classification phase of each tie hosting the second leg. The quarter-final pairings were pre-determined based on the teams' final position in the classification phase. In the semi-finals the teams were re-seeded based also on their final position in the classification phase in order to determine the two pairings. The quarter-finals and semi-finals matchups were determined as follows:

Quarter-finals

- Match A: Third placed team vs. Sixth placed team
- Match B: Fourth placed team vs. Fifth placed team
- Match C: First placed team vs. Eighth placed team
- Match D: Second placed team vs. Seventh placed team

Semi-finals

- Match I: Second best placed semi-finalist vs. Third best placed semi-finalist
- Match II: Top-placed semi-finalist vs. Fourth best placed semi-finalist

Both champions of the Apertura and Clausura tournaments plus the best placed team on the aggregate table (excluding the two champions) at the end of the season qualified for the 2023 CONCACAF Central American Cup.

=== Format changes ===
The following changes were adopted as of this season:

- The away goals rule was abolished and was no longer taken into account as a tie-breaker criterion in the final phase series.
- The tie-breaker criterion based on the seeds used to determine a qualification in the event of a tie on aggregate was also abolished. Instead, it was decided to play extra time and a penalty shoot-out if necessary.

== Teams ==
=== Promotion and relegation (pre-season) ===
A total of 12 teams took part in this season: the top ten teams from the aggregate table of the 2021–22 season as well as two promoted teams from the 2021–22 Primera División season, which were Deportivo Mixco and Xinabajul-Huehue. Deportivo Mixco earned promotion for being finalists in both Apertura and Clausura tournaments of the 2021–22 season, while Xinabajul-Huehue ensured promotion to the Liga Nacional on 4 June 2022, after winning the promotion play-off against Deportivo Marquense.

Teams relegated to Primera División de Ascenso

The two promoted teams replaced Sololá and Nueva Concepción, the bottom two teams in the aggregate table of the 2021–22 season, who were relegated to Primera División.

=== Stadiums and locations ===
Team	City	Stadium	Capacity
Achuapa	El Progreso	Winston Pineda	6,000
Antigua	Antigua Guatemala	Pensativo	10,000
Cobán Imperial	Cobán	Verapaz	15,000
Comunicaciones	Guatemala City	Doroteo Guamuch Flores	26,000
Guastatoya	Guastatoya	David Cordón Hichos	3,100
Iztapa	Iztapa	El Morón	4,800
Malacateco	Malacatán	Santa Lucía	7,000
Mixco	Mixco	Santo Domingo de Guzmán	5,200
Municipal	Guatemala City	El Trébol	7,500
Santa Lucía	Santa Lucía Cotzumalguapa	Santa Lucía Cotzumalguapa	9,000
Xelajú	Quetzaltenango	Mario Camposeco	11,220
Xinabajul-Huehue	Huehuetenango	Los Cuchumatanes	5,340

=== Personnel and kits ===
Team	Head coach	Captain	Kit manufacturer	Shirt sponsor(s)
Achuapa	(Guatemala) Hamilton López (caretaker)	(Guatemala) Rigoberto Hernández	NS Sport	
Antigua	(Argentina) Ramiro Cepeda	(Costa Rica) José Mena	Joma	
Cobán Imperial	(Uruguay) César Méndez	(Brazil) Janderson	MG Sports	
Comunicaciones	(Uruguay) Willy Coito	(Guatemala) José Manuel Contreras	Kelme	
Guastatoya	(Nicaragua) Mario Acevedo	(Guatemala) Rubén Morales	Guza−Sport	
Iztapa	(Argentina) Pablo Garabello	(Guatemala) Pedro Samayoa	Tuto Sport	
Malacateco	(Guatemala) Walter Claverí	(Guatemala) Jorge Sánchez	Silver Sport	
Mixco	(Guatemala) Fabricio Benítez	(Guatemala) Jean Márquez	JM12	
Municipal	(Paraguay) José Cardozo	(Guatemala) Marlon Sequén	Umbro	
Santa Lucía	(Costa Rica) Rónald Gómez	(Guatemala) Mafre Icuté	Silver Sport	
Xelajú	(Guatemala) Amarini Villatoro	(Costa Rica) Kenner Gutiérrez	MR	
Xinabajul-Huehue	(Argentina) Pablo Centrone	(Guatemala) Kristian Guzmán	Orion	

=== Managerial changes ===
Team	Outgoing manager	Manner of departure	Date of vacancy	Position in table	Incoming manager	Date of appointment
Torneo Apertura
Xelajú	(Mexico) Irving Rubirosa	End of contract	13 May 2022	Pre-season	(Guatemala) Amarini Villatoro	24 May 2022
Cobán Imperial	(Argentina) Sebastián Bini	End of contract	15 May 2022	Pre-season	(Mexico) Roberto Montoya	6 June 2022
Municipal	(Paraguay) José Cardozo	Mutual agreement	30 May 2022	Pre-season	(Mexico) Juan Antonio Torres	21 June 2022
Iztapa	(Colombia) Richard Parra	Mutual agreement	11 August 2022	10th	(Colombia) Milton García (Note: Originally as caretaker manager but later appointed on a permanent basis.) (Note: Milton García was the caretaker manager for the Torneo Apertura 4th round match against Cobán Imperial on 10 August 2022.)	12 August 2022
Santa Lucía	(Argentina) Matías Tatangelo	Sacked	1 September 2022	12th	(Spain) Juan Cortés	6 September 2022
Achuapa	(Mexico) Adrián García	Resigned	14 September 2022	8th	(Honduras) Ramón Maradiaga	14 September 2022
Malacateco	(Mexico) Israel Hernández	Mutual agreement	18 September 2022	8th	(Mexico) Adrián García	21 September 2022
Mixco	(Guatemala) Julio Gómez	Mutual agreement	3 October 2022	11th	(Costa Rica) Douglas Sequeira	5 October 2022
Municipal	(Mexico) Juan Antonio Torres	Mutual agreement	17 October 2022	7th	(Paraguay) José Cardozo	20 October 2022
Xinabajul-Huehue	(Uruguay) Silvio Fernández	Mutual agreement	12 December 2022	10th	(Argentina) Pablo Centrone	16 December 2022
Santa Lucía	(Spain) Juan Cortés	Mutual agreement	17 December 2022	12th	(Costa Rica) Rónald Gómez	19 December 2022
Torneo Clausura
Achuapa	(Honduras) Ramón Maradiaga	Mutual agreement	2 February 2023	12th	(Guatemala) Hamilton López (Note: Caretaker manager.)	2 February 2023
Achuapa	(Guatemala) Hamilton López	End of caretaker spell	7 February 2023	12th	(Mexico) Raúl Arias	7 February 2023
Iztapa	(Colombia) Milton García	Mutual agreement	20 February 2023	8th	(Argentina) Pablo Garabello	20 February 2021
Mixco	(Costa Rica) Douglas Sequeira	Resigned	6 March 2023	8th	(Guatemala) Fabricio Benítez	7 March 2023
Cobán Imperial	(Mexico) Roberto Montoya	Sacked	13 March 2023	12th	(Uruguay) César Méndez	16 March 2023
Malacateco	(Mexico) Adrián García Arias	Sacked	10 April 2023	8th	(Guatemala) Walter Claverí	11 April 2023
Achuapa	(Mexico) Raúl Arias	Resigned	17 April 2023	8th	(Guatemala) Hamilton López	17 April 2023

== Apertura ==
The Apertura 2022 tournament began on 23 July and ended on 18 December 2022. Comunicaciones were the defending champions, having won the Clausura 2022 tournament at the previous season.

=== Classification phase – Apertura 2022 ===
The classification phase of the Apertura tournament ran from 23 July to 27 November 2022.

==== Standings ====
Pos	Team	Pld	W	D	L	GF	GA	GD	Pts	Qualification
1	Antigua	22	12	5	5	47	27	+20	41	Advance to Quarter-finals
2	Cobán Imperial	22	11	6	5	35	27	+8	39	Advance to Quarter-finals
3	Comunicaciones	22	11	6	5	33	25	+8	39	Advance to Quarter-finals
4	Malacateco	22	10	4	8	30	26	+4	34	Advance to Quarter-finals
5	Municipal	22	9	6	7	31	22	+9	33	Advance to Quarter-finals
6	Guastatoya	22	7	9	6	20	18	+2	30	Advance to Quarter-finals
7	Xelajú	22	7	8	7	29	22	+7	29	Advance to Quarter-finals
8	Achuapa	22	7	7	8	27	37	−10	28	Advance to Quarter-finals
9	Iztapa	22	7	6	9	31	35	−4	27	
10	Xinabajul-Huehue	22	7	5	10	23	29	−6	26	
11	Mixco	22	2	10	10	17	35	−18	16	
12	Santa Lucía	22	3	6	13	20	40	−20	15	

Source: Liga Nacional, Soccerway
Rules for classification: 1) Points; 2) Goal difference; 3) Goals for; 4) Away goals for; 5) Matches won; 6) Away matches won; 7) Head-to-head results; 8) Fair play points; 9) Drawing of lots.

==== Results ====
The match schedule was decided based on the draw which was held on 17 June 2022.

Home \ Away	ACH	ANT	COB	COM	GUA	IZT	MAL	MIX	MUN	SLC	XEL	XIN
Achuapa	—	0–3	2–2	2–1	2–0	1–1	2–1	4–1	1–0	2–1	1–0	2–2
Antigua	6–0	—	2–0	3–0	1–1	4–1	2–1	2–0	0–3	3–2	2–2	3–0
Cobán Imperial	3–2	3–1	—	2–1	1–0	1–0	2–1	0–0	0–0	2–1	1–0	3–1
Comunicaciones	3–0	2–2	2–2	—	0–0	2–0	2–1	3–1	2–2	2–1	1–0	1–0
Guastatoya	2–0	2–2	3–0	0–1	—	3–0	0–0	0–0	1–3	1–1	2–1	1–0
Iztapa	4–1	4–1	4–3	0–2	0–1	—	2–1	3–0	3–2	1–1	1–1	0–1
Malacateco	1–0	2–1	1–0	4–2	1–1	1–1	—	3–0	1–0	3–1	1–0	2–1
Mixco	2–2	0–2	2–2	1–1	0–1	2–2	0–2	—	1–4	0–0	2–0	2–0
Municipal	1–1	0–1	1–4	2–3	0–0	1–0	4–1	1–0	—	2–0	1–1	2–0
Santa Lucía	1–0	0–3	1–3	1–1	1–0	2–3	1–1	1–1	1–0	—	1–4	0–2
Xelajú	1–1	2–2	1–0	0–1	1–1	3–0	1–0	1–1	1–1	4–1	—	3–1
Xinabajul-Huehue	1–1	2–1	1–1	1–0	3–0	1–1	3–1	1–1	0–1	2–1	0–2	—

Source: Guatefutbol, Soccerway
Legend: Blue = home team win; Yellow = draw; Red = away team win.

==== Top goalscorers ====
Players sorted first by goals scored, then by last name. Goals scored during the final phase are not included as the tournament top scorer award only takes into account goals scored in the classification phase.

Rank	Player	Club	Goals
1	(Argentina) Lucas Gómez	Antigua	12
1	(Argentina) Nicolás Martínez	Cobán Imperial	12
3	(Guatemala) Darwin Lom	Xelajú	10
4	(Colombia) Jhony Cano	Iztapa	9
5	(Brazil) Janderson	Cobán Imperial	8
5	(Mexico) Luis Ángel Landín	Comunicaciones	8
5	(Mexico) Isaac Acuña	Santa Lucía	8
8	(Guatemala) Kevin Bordón	Achuapa	7
8	(Guatemala) Dewinder Bradley	Antigua	7
8	(Uruguay) Paolo Dantaz	Xinabajul-Huehue	7
8	(Guatemala) Oscar Santis	Comunicaciones	7

Source: Soccerway

Note

1. ^{A} Lucas Gómez (1,435 minutes played) and Nicolás Martínez (1,744 minutes played) tied in goals scored. Lucas Gómez won the Apertura 2022 goal scorer's award for having played fewer minutes.

=== Final phase – Apertura 2022 ===
The final phase of the Apertura tournament ran from 30 November to 18 December 2022.

==== Bracket ====
Quarter-finals
6	Guastatoya	0	0	0
3	Comunicaciones	0	2	2
7	Xelajú	0	0	0
2	Cobán Imperial	0	1	1
5	Municipal	2	0	2
4	Malacateco	0	1	1
8	Achuapa	1	0	1
1	Antigua	1	2	3

Semi-finals
3	Comunicaciones	0	0	0
2	Cobán Imperial	1	2	3
5	Municipal	0	0	0
1	Antigua	1	1	2

Finals
2	Cobán Imperial	1	0	1
1	Antigua	0	0	0

==== Quarter-finals ====
30 November 2022
11:00

Guastatoya	0–0	Comunicaciones
	Report; Referee report

Estadio David Cordón Hichos, Guastatoya
Attendance: 2,000
Referee: Bryan Fernández
3 December 2022
18:00

Comunicaciones	2–0	Guastatoya
Morales 59'; Samayoa 76'	Report; Referee report

Estadio Doroteo Guamuch Flores, Guatemala City
Attendance: 5,000
Referee: Julio Luna

Comunicaciones won 2–0 on aggregate and advanced to the semi-finals.

30 November 2022
15:00

Municipal	2–0	Malacateco
Morales 8'; Portillo 14'	Report; Referee report

Estadio Manuel Felipe Carrera, Guatemala City
Referee: Kevyn Cacao
3 December 2022
12:00

Malacateco	1–0	Municipal
Córdoba 85'	Report; Referee report

Estadio Santa Lucía, Malacatán
Referee: Sergio Reyna

Municipal won 2–1 on aggregate and advanced to the semi-finals.

1 December 2022
15:00

Achuapa	1–1	Antigua
Lemus 56'	Report; Referee report	Bradley 60'

Estadio Winston Pineda, Jutiapa
Referee: Ignacio Fuentes
4 December 2022
18:00

Antigua	2–0	Achuapa
Bradley 45+1'; Romário 52'	Report; Referee report

Estadio Pensativo, Antigua Guatemala
Referee: Walter López

Antigua won 3–1 on aggregate and advanced to the semi-finals.

1 December 2022
21:00

Xelajú	0–0	Cobán Imperial
	Report; Referee report

Estadio Mario Camposeco, Quetzaltenango
Referee: Cristhofer Corado
4 December 2022
14:30

Cobán Imperial	1–0	Xelajú
Álvarez 23'	Report; Referee report

Estadio Verapaz, Cobán
Referee: Luis Ventura

Cobán Imperial won 1–0 on aggregate and advanced to the semi-finals.

==== Semi-finals ====
7 December 2022
19:00

Comunicaciones	0–1	Cobán Imperial
	Report; Referee report	Thales 51'

Estadio Doroteo Guamuch Flores, Guatemala City
Attendance: 8,000
Referee: Ignacio Fuentes
10 December 2022
14:30

Cobán Imperial	2–0	Comunicaciones
Janderson 11'; Betancourth 65'	Report; Referee report

Estadio Verapaz, Cobán
Attendance: 11,000
Referee: Walter López

Cobán Imperial won 3–0 on aggregate and advanced to the finals.

8 December 2022
20:00

Municipal	0–1	Antigua
	Report; Referee report	Ardón 82'

Estadio Doroteo Guamuch Flores, Guatemala City
Referee: Sergio Reyna
11 December 2022
18:00

Antigua	1–0	Municipal
Bradley 61'	Report; Referee report

Estadio Pensativo, Antigua Guatemala
Referee: Bryan López

Antigua won 2–0 on aggregate and advanced to the finals.

==== Finals ====
15 December 2022
15:00

Cobán Imperial	1–0	Antigua
Betancourth 65'	Report; Referee report

Estadio Verapaz, Cobán
Attendance: 13,000
Referee: Bryan López
18 December 2022
18:00

Antigua	0–0	Cobán Imperial
	Report; Referee report

Estadio Pensativo, Antigua Guatemala
Attendance: 10,000
Referee: Walter López

Cobán Imperial won 1–0 on aggregate. As Torneo Apertura champions they qualified for the 2023 CONCACAF Central American Cup.

== Clausura ==
The Clausura 2023 tournament began on 21 January and ended on 27 May 2023. The defending champions were Cobán Imperial, who had won the previous Apertura 2022 tournament.

As of this tournament, the Liga Nacional was renamed "Liga Guate Banrural" for sponsorship reasons due to a three-year agreement signed with the Banco de Desarrollo Rural.

=== Classification phase – Clausura 2023 ===
The classification phase of the Clausura tournament ran from 21 January to 7 May 2023.

==== Standings ====
Pos	Team	Pld	W	D	L	GF	GA	GD	Pts	Qualification
1	Comunicaciones	22	12	9	1	37	16	+21	45	Advance to Quarter-finals
2	Municipal	22	13	4	5	44	21	+23	43	Advance to Quarter-finals
3	Xelajú	22	12	7	3	29	8	+21	43	Advance to Quarter-finals
4	Xinabajul-Huehue	22	8	7	7	27	29	−2	31	Advance to Quarter-finals
5	Guastatoya	22	7	8	7	28	22	+6	29	Advance to Quarter-finals
6	Mixco	22	7	8	7	23	22	+1	29	Advance to Quarter-finals
7	Antigua	22	8	5	9	33	37	−4	29	Advance to Quarter-finals
8	Achuapa	22	7	5	10	24	45	−21	26	Advance to Quarter-finals
9	Cobán Imperial	22	6	7	9	16	17	−1	25	
10	Iztapa	22	5	5	12	30	49	−19	20	
11	Malacateco	22	4	7	11	24	33	−9	19	
12	Santa Lucía	22	5	4	13	14	30	−16	19	

Source: FPF
Rules for classification: 1) Points; 2) Goal difference; 3) Goals for; 4) Away goals for; 5) Matches won; 6) Away matches won; 7) Head-to-head results; 8) Fair play points; 9) Drawing of lots.

==== Results ====
The match schedule was decided based on the draw which took place during the Extraordinary General Assembly of the Liga Nacional held on 20 December 2022.

Home \ Away	ACH	ANT	COB	COM	GUA	IZT	MAL	MIX	MUN	SLC	XEL	XIN
Achuapa	—	0–0	0–0	0–2	3–2	5–3	4–3	1–0	0–1	1–0	0–1	4–2
Antigua	6–1	—	1–1	1–2	3–1	5–2	0–1	2–1	2–1	1–1	1–3	1–3
Cobán Imperial	1–2	1–2	—	1–1	0–0	2–0	2–0	0–1	0–2	1–0	0–1	1–1
Comunicaciones	0–0	4–0	1–0	—	2–0	4–2	2–2	1–0	1–0	3–1	0–0	0–0
Guastatoya	3–0	3–1	0–0	1–1	—	1–1	4–0	3–0	2–1	1–0	0–3	4–1
Iztapa	4–0	2–1	0–3	1–5	1–1	—	2–2	3–1	2–2	1–0	1–1	1–2
Malacateco	0–0	1–2	0–1	1–2	0–0	1–0	—	1–1	2–2	3–0	0–3 (Note: Match awarded 3–0 to Xelajú as a result of Malacateco fielded six foreign players, one more than allowed. The match had originally ended in a 1–1 draw.)	3–0
Mixco	3–0	1–2	1–0	0–0	1–1	4–2	1–0	—	3–1	1–0	0–1	2–2
Municipal	5–1	4–0	1–0	3–3	1–0	4–0	2–1	2–2	—	2–0	1–0	3–0
Santa Lucía	1–0	1–1	2–0	0–0	2–1	1–2	2–1	0–0	0–4	—	1–0	0–1
Xelajú	6–1	0–0	1–1	1–2	0–0	3–0	2–1	0–0	1–0	1–0	—	0–0
Xinabajul-Huehue	1–1	3–1	0–1	2–1	1–0	1–0	1–1	0–0	1–2	5–2	0–1	—

Source: Soccerway
Legend: Blue = home team win; Yellow = draw; Red = away team win.

==== Top goalscorers ====
Players sorted first by goals scored, then by last name. Goals scored during the final phase are not included as the tournament top scorer award only takes into account goals scored in the classification phase.

Rank	Player	Club	Goals
1	(Argentina) Matías Rotondi	Municipal	14
2	(Panama) Azarías Londoño	Comunicaciones	9
3	(Paraguay) Marcelo Ferreira	Iztapa	8
3	(Guatemala) Erick Lemus	Iztapa	8
3	(Cuba) Yasnier Matos	Municipal	8
3	(Guatemala) Gerson Tinoco	Xinabajul-Huehue	8
3	(Mexico) Óscar Villa	Xelajú	8
8	(Guatemala) Cristian Albizures	Iztapa	7
8	(Colombia) Eliser Quiñones	Achuapa	7
10	(Colombia) Feiver Mercado	Malacateco	6

Source: Soccerway

=== Final phase – Clausura 2023 ===
The final phase of the Clausura tournament ran from 10 to 27 May 2023.

==== Bracket ====
Quarter-finals
7	Antigua	2	1	3 (3)
2	Municipal (p)	1	2	3 (1)
8	Achuapa	2	1	3
1	Comunicaciones (a.e.t.)	0	4	4
5	Guastatoya	2	0	2
4	Xinabajul-Huehue	0	1	1
6	Mixco	0	1	1
3	Xelajú	1	1	2

Semi-finals
7	Antigua (p)	0	1	1 (3)
1	Comunicaciones	0	1	1 (2)
5	Guastatoya	1	1	2
3	Xelajú	1	2	3

Finals
7	Antigua	2	0	2
3	Xelajú	0	3	3

==== Quarter-finals ====
10 May 2023
16:00

Mixco	0–1	Xelajú
	Report; Referee report	Lom 45+4' (pen.)

Estadio Santo Domingo de Guzmán, Mixco
Referee: Wildomar Ramírez
13 May 2022
20:00

Xelajú	1–1	Mixco
Cardona 28'	Report; Referee report	García 36'

Estadio Mario Camposeco, Quetzaltenango
Referee: Sergio Reyna

Xelajú won 2–1 on aggregate and advanced to the semi-finals.

10 May 2023
11:00

Guastatoya	2–0	Xinabajul-Huehue
Morán 56'; Ortiz 66'	Report; Referee report

Estadio David Cordón Hichos, Guastatoya
Referee: Stib Morals
13 May 2023
18:00

Xinabajul-Huehue	1–0	Guastatoya
Tinoco 55'	Report; Referee report

Estadio Los Cuchumatanes, Huehuetenango
Referee: Cristhofer Corado

Guastatoya won 2–1 on aggregate and advanced to the semi-finals.

11 May 2023
15:30

Achuapa	2–0	Comunicaciones
González 23' (o.g.); Bordón 35'	Report; Referee report

Estadio Winston Pineda, Jutiapa
Attendance: 4,000
Referee: Bryan López
14 May 2023
18:00

Comunicaciones	4–1 (a.e.t.)	Achuapa
Londoño 27', 90+2'; Samayoa 93'; García 116'	Report; Referee report	Mazariegos 119'

Estadio Doroteo Guamuch Flores, Guatemala City
Attendance: 15,000
Referee: Julio Luna

Comunicaciones won 4–3 on aggregate and advanced to the semi-finals.

11 May 2023
19:00

Antigua	2–1	Municipal
Bradley 36'; Hernández 58'	Report; Referee report	Altán 29'

Estadio Pensativo, Antigua Guatemala
Referee: Walter López
14 May 2023
15:00

Municipal	2–1	Antigua
Matos 49', 80' (pen.)	Report; Referee report	Bradley 67'
Penalties
Portillo (penalty missed); Martínez (penalty scored); Matos (penalty missed); Acuña (penalty missed)	1–3	(penalty scored) Mena; (penalty scored) Ardón; (penalty missed) Castellanos; (penalty missed) Robinson; (penalty scored) Mejía

Estadio Manuel Felipe Carrera, Guatemala City
Referee: Mario Escobar

Tied 3–3 on aggregate, Antigua won on penalties and advanced to the semi-finals.

==== Semi-finals ====
17 May 2023
11:00

Guastatoya	1–1	Xelajú
Ortiz 26'	Report; Referee report	Villa 83'

Estadio David Cordón Hichos, Guastatoya
Referee: Walter López
20 May 2023
20:00

Xelajú	2–1	Guastatoya
Gutiérrez 8' (pen.); Cardona 50'	Report; Referee report	Vargas 71'

Estadio Mario Camposeco, Quetzaltenango
Referee: Mario Escobar

Xelajú won 3–2 on aggregate and advanced to the finals.

18 May 2023
19:00

Antigua	0–0	Comunicaciones
	Report; Referee report

Estadio Pensativo, Antigua Guatemala
Attendance: 10,000
Referee: Cristhofer Corado
21 May 2023
19:00

Comunicaciones	1–1 (a.e.t.)	Antigua
Londoño 112'	Report; Referee report	Hernández 120+2'
Penalties
Aparicio (penalty missed); Londoño (penalty missed); Barreto (penalty scored); Samayoa (penalty scored); Lezcano (penalty missed)	2–3	(penalty scored) Mena; (penalty missed) Ardón; (penalty scored) Hernández; (penalty scored) Romário

Estadio Doroteo Guamuch Flores, Guatemala City
Attendance: 12,000
Referee: Sergio Reyna

Tied 1–1 on aggregate, Antigua won on penalties and advanced to the semi-finals.

==== Finals ====
24 May 2023
19:00

Antigua	2–0	Xelajú
Hernández 88'; Mejía 90+3'	Report; Referee report

Estadio Pensativo, Antigua Guatemala
Referee: Cristhofer Corado
27 May 2023
20:00

Xelajú	3–0	Antigua
Villa 36'; De León 72', 87'	Report; Referee report

Estadio Mario Camposeco, Quetzaltenango
Referee: Mario Escobar

Xelajú won 3–2 on aggregate. As Torneo Clausura champions they qualified for the 2023 CONCACAF Central American Cup.

== Aggregate table ==
The aggregate table was used to determine the third qualified team for the 2023 CONCACAF Central American Cup, besides the Apertura and Clausura champions, and the two relegated teams to the 2023–24 Primera División.

Pos	Team	Pld	W	D	L	GF	GA	GD	Pts	Qualification
1	Comunicaciones	44	23	15	6	70	41	+29	84	Qualification for the CONCACAF Central American Cup
2	Municipal	44	22	10	12	75	43	+32	76	
3	Xelajú (C)	44	19	15	10	58	31	+27	72	Qualification for the CONCACAF Central American Cup
4	Antigua	44	20	10	14	80	64	+16	70	
5	Cobán Imperial (C)	44	17	13	14	51	44	+7	64	Qualification for the CONCACAF Central American Cup
6	Guastatoya	44	14	17	13	48	40	+8	59	
7	Xinabajul-Huehue	44	15	12	17	50	58	−8	57	
8	Achuapa	44	14	12	18	51	81	−30	54	
9	Malacateco	44	13	11	20	52	62	−10	50	
10	Mixco	44	10	18	16	43	55	−12	48	
11	Iztapa (R)	44	12	11	21	61	84	−23	47	Relegation to Primera División
12	Santa Lucía (R)	44	8	10	26	34	70	−36	34	Relegation to Primera División

Source: Liga Nacional
Rules for classification: 1) Points; 2) Goal difference; 3) Goals for; 4) Away goals for; 5) Matches won; 6) Away matches won; 7) Head-to-head results; 8) Fair play points; 9) Drawing of lots.
(C) Champions; (R) Relegated
