= Kendel Herrarte =

Guatemalan footballer (born 1992)

Personal information
- Full name: Kendel Omar Herrarte Mayen
- Date of birth: 6 April 1992 (age 34)
- Place of birth: Guatemala City, Guatemala
- Height: 1.69 m (5 ft 6 1/2 in)
- Position: Attacking midfielder

Team information
- Current team: Atlético Mictlán
- Number: 7

Youth career
- Comunicaciones

Senior career*
Years	Team	Apps	(Gls)
2011–2019	Comunicaciones	234	(12)
2016	→ Antigua (loan)	45	(2)
2019–2020	Guastatoya	35	(1)
2020–2022	Santa Lucía	38	(1)
2022	Coatepeque		
2023	San Benito		
2024–2025	Santa Lucía		
2025–	Atlético Mictlán	4	(1)

International career
2009	Guatemala U17	3	(1)
2009–2011	Guatemala U20	12	(2)
2013–2016	Guatemala	18	(0)
- * Club domestic league appearances and goals as of 20:00, 23 August 2025 (UTC)

Kendel Omar Herrarte Mayen (born 6 April 1992) is a Guatemalan professional footballer who plays as an attacking midfielder for Liga Nos Une club Atlético Mictlán.

== Club career ==
=== Comunicaciones ===
==== 2015–16: Loan to Antigua ====
On 24 December 2015, it was officially confirmed that Herrarte would go out on loan to Antigua.

On 6 January 2016, Herrarte and Agustín Herrera were presented as new signings of Antigua. Ten days later, he would make his debut for the club against Xelajú, where he was substituted off at the 86th minute for Axel Garcia in a 3–1 win.

==== 2016–17: Return to Comunicaciones ====
On 3 January 2017, it was confirmed that Herrarte would not be signing a permanent deal with Antigua. Two days later, Comunicaciones announced the return of Herrarte after his loan spell at Antigua.

==== 2018–19: Final season and departure ====
On 3 June 2019, Comunicaciones confirmed on social media that Herrarte would depart from the club.

=== Guastatoya ===
Few days after leaving Comunicaciones, Guastatoya announced Herrarte as one of the club's new signings.

=== San Benito ===
On 13 December 2022, it was officially confirmed that Herrarte had signed for San Benito.

=== Atlético Mictlán ===
On 13 June 2025, newly promoted Atlético Mictlán announced the signing of Herrarte, thus making his return to the Liga Nacional.

== International career ==
He was called up to the Guatemala team for the 2015 CONCACAF Gold Cup; he played in Guatemala's opening game.

== Personal life ==
=== Legal issues ===
On 22 March 2018, Herrarte was arrested outside the Estadio Cementos Progreso due to allegations of domestic violence.

== Honours ==
Comunicaciones

- Liga Nacional: Clausura 2011, Apertura 2011, Clausura 2013, Apertura 2013, Clausura 2014, Apertura 2014, 2015 Clausura

Antigua

- Liga Nacional: Apertura 2017

Santa Lucía

- Liga Nacional: Clausura 2021
