= Carlos Díaz (footballer, born 1974) =

Argentine professional footballer

Personal information
- Full name: Carlos Alberto Díaz
- Date of birth: 15 May 1974 (age 52)
- Place of birth: Buenos Aires, Argentina
- Height: 1.80 m (5 ft 11 in)
- Position: Goalkeeper

Team information
- Current team: Puntarenas

Youth career
- Boca Juniors

Senior career*
Years	Team	Apps	(Gls)
1993–1994	Argentino		
1995–1996	Deportivo Laferrere		
1997–1998	Atlético Tucumán	0	(0)
1999	Deportivo Laferrere		
1999–2000	Gimnasia y Tiro	0	(0)
2000	Luján de Cuyo	0	(0)
2000	Argentino		
2001–2002	Defensores de Belgrano	15	(0)
2003	Sarmiento	18	(0)
2003–2006	Cartaginés	98	(0)
2006	Gimnasia y Esgrima	6	(0)
2007	Carmelita	6	(0)
2007–2008	Brujas	45	(0)
2009	Ramonense	15	(0)
2009–2010	Cartaginés	20	(0)
2010	Cobán Imperial		
2011	Deportivo Quevedo	8	(0)
2011–2012	Orión	32	(0)
2012	Petén		
2013	Puntarenas	22	(0)
2013	Sayaxché		
2015	Turrialba		
2016	Deportivo Malacateco	51	(0)
2017	Xelajú	14	(0)
2017	Deportivo Mictlán		
2018	CSyD Sacachispas		
2018	Uruguay de Coronado		
2018	Rosario FC		
2019	Deportivo Reu		
2020	AD Guanacasteca		
2020	Puerto Golfito FC		
2021–	Puntarenas		
- * Club domestic league appearances and goals as of 16:56, 13 January 2021 (UTC)

Carlos Alberto Díaz (born 15 May 1974) is an Argentine professional footballer who plays as a goalkeeper for Puntarenas.

== Career ==
Díaz, via Boca Juniors, started his career in July 1993 with Argentino of Primera B Metropolitana. The goalkeeper headed to fellow third tier team Deportivo Laferrere in January 1995, remaining for two years. A move to Primera B Nacional soon followed with Atlético Tucumán, though he wouldn't appear competitively for them across 1997 or 1998. Díaz spent the first six months of 1999 back with Laferrere. He took his overall tally of appearances for the club to forty-five during his second spell there. July 1999 saw a return to the second tier with Gimnasia y Tiro. No league matches occurred as they suffered relegation.

Torneo Argentino A's Luján de Cuyo became Díaz's fifth career club in July 2000. He then, shortly into 2000–01, went back to Argentino, before heading off to Defensores de Belgrano of Primera B Metropolitana in January 2001. They won promotion as champions within his first six months, though he didn't feature in any league fixtures; he'd eventually participate in a total of fifteen matches for them between 2002 and 2003, though he'd leave midway through 2002–03 to drop down a tier to Sarmiento. He lasted six months and made eighteen appearances. July 2003 saw Díaz leave for Costa Rica and Cartaginés.

After becoming the club's first foreign goalkeeper, Díaz appeared ninety-eight times for Cartaginés across the 2003–04, 2004–05 and 2005–06 seasons. He returned to his homeland in July 2006 with Torneo Argentino A club Gimnasia y Esgrima, though after six appearances he headed back to Costa Rica with Carmelita in early 2007. Six appearances followed, which preceded Díaz going to Brujas in mid-2007. He remained for one and a half seasons, before switching Desamparados for San Ramón by agreeing terms with Ramonense in January 2009. Midway through that year, Díaz put pen to paper to rejoin Cartaginés.

After being sent off in the final match of his second spell with Cartaginés against Santos de Guápiles on 11 April 2010, Díaz sealed a move to Primera División de Ascenso outfit Cobán Imperial. His stay in Guatemala lasted just a few months, before the goalkeeper secured a contract with newly promoted Ecuadorian Serie B side Deportivo Quevedo in January 2011. In the succeeding June, a return to Costa Rica with Orión was completed. He remained for the entirety of 2011–12, which concluded with relegation to the Segunda División. Díaz spent the first half of 2012–13 back in Guatemalan football with tier two's Petén.

Costa Rica's Puntarenas became Díaz's seventeenth career club in January 2013, as the six-month stint with the Primera División club preceded a short spell with Guatemala's lower league Sayaxché. January 2015 saw Díaz go to Costa Rica again as he joined Segunda División outfit Turrialba. A third spell in Guatemala arrived one year later as he signed for Deportivo Malacateco. He made his debut in Liga Nacional on 24 January 2016 versus Xelajú, which was the first of twenty-seven matches in 2015–16. Díaz would feature twenty-six times in the first part of 2016–17, before spending the rest of the season with Xelajú.

Díaz spent July 2017 to December 2019 in Guatemala's Primera División de Ascenso with five clubs, initially joining Deportivo Mictlán before having time with CSyD Sacachispas, Uruguay de Coronado, Rosario FC and Deportivo Reu. In January 2020, Costa Rican second tier side AD Guanacasteca signed Díaz. He soon broke the record for the division's oldest player. He left halfway through the year, subsequently signing with divisional rivals Puerto Golfito FC. He was voted the Apertura's best goalkeeper, prior to securing a return to second tier Puntarenas in January 2021; aged forty-six.

== Career statistics ==
As of 13 January 2021.

Appearances and goals by club, season and competition
Club	Season	League			Cup		League Cup		Continental		Other		Total	
Club	Season	Division	Apps	Goals	Apps	Goals	Apps	Goals	Apps	Goals	Apps	Goals	Apps	Goals
Atlético Tucumán	1996–97	Primera B Nacional	0	0	0	0	—		—		0	0	0	0
Atlético Tucumán	1997–98	Primera B Nacional	0	0	0	0	—		—		0	0	0	0
Atlético Tucumán	1998–99	Primera B Nacional	0	0	0	0	—		—		0	0	0	0
Atlético Tucumán	Total		0	0	0	0	—		—		0	0	0	0
Gimnasia y Tiro	1999–00	Primera B Nacional	0	0	0	0	—		—		0	0	0	0
Luján de Cuyo	2000–01	Torneo Argentino A	0	0	0	0	—		—		0	0	0	0
Sarmiento	2002–03	Primera B Metropolitana	18	0	0	0	—		—		0	0	18	0
Gimnasia y Esgrima	2006–07	Torneo Argentino A	6	0	0	0	—		—		0	0	6	0
Carmelita	2006–07	Primera División	6	0	0	0	—		—		0	0	6	0
Ramonense	2008–09	Primera División	15	0	0	0	—		—		0	0	15	0
Cartaginés	2009–10	Primera División	20	0	0	0	—		—		0	0	20	0
Deportivo Quevedo	2011	Serie B	8	0	0	0	—		—		0	0	8	0
Orión	2011–12	Primera División	32	0	0	0	—		—		2 (Note: Appearance(s) in the Primera División play-offs)	0	34	0
Puntarenas	2012–13	Primera División	22	0	0	0	—		—		0	0	22	0
Deportivo Malacateco	2015–16	Liga Nacional	25	0	0	0	—		—		2 (Note: Appearance(s) in the Liga Nacional play-offs)	0	27	0
Deportivo Malacateco	2016–17	Liga Nacional	26	0	0	0	—		—		0	0	26	0
Deportivo Malacateco	Total		51	0	0	0	—		—		0	0	51	0
Xelajú	2016–17	Liga Nacional	14	0	0	0	—		—		0	0	14	0
Career total			200	0	0	0	0	0	0	0	4	0	204	0

== Honours ==
Defensores de Belgrano

- Primera B Metropolitana: 2000–01
