= Eduardo Acevedo (Guatemalan footballer) =

Guatemalan footballer and manager

Personal information
- Full name: Eduardo Acevedo Pineda
- Date of birth: June 8, 1964 (age 62)
- Place of birth: Guatemala
- Height: 1.74 m (5 ft 8 1/2 in)
- Position: Defender

Team information
- Current team: Deportivo Coatepeque (manager)

Senior career*
Years	Team	Apps	(Gls)
–1996	Comunicaciones		
1999–2000	Antigua GFC		
2000–2001	Municipal		

International career^{‡}
1991–2000	Guatemala	23	(0)

Managerial career
- 2007–2008: Comunicaciones
- 2009–2010: Deportivo Iztapa
- 2010–: Deportivo Coatepeque
- * Club domestic league appearances and goals as of 23 July 2010 ‡ National team caps and goals as of 23 July 2010

Eduardo "Gasparín" Acevedo Pineda (born 8 June 1964) is a Guatemalan football manager and retired football defender.

He is currently in charge of Guatemalan second division side Deportivo Coatepeque.

== Club career ==
Acevedo played the majority of his professional career at Guatemalan club CSD Comunicaciones, where he went on to become the team captain and earn the nickname "Gasparín", same as the club's mascot and in reference to his loyalty for the club. Later on, however, he became a member of Comunicaciones' arch-rivals C.S.D. Municipal and also had a tenure at Antigua GFC.

== International career ==
He made his debut for Guatemala in a May 1991 UNCAF Nations Cup match against El Salvador and has earned a total of 23 caps, scoring no goals. He has represented his country in 4 FIFA World Cup qualification matches and was a squad member at the 1991 UNCAF Nations Cup as well as at the 1991, 1996 and 2000 CONCACAF Gold Cups.

His final international was a May 2000 FIFA World Cup qualification match against El Salvador.

== Managerial career ==
After his playing career Acevedo embarked on a coaching career and worked at Comunicaciones as understudy to Iván León. They were dismissed in 2008. He left Deportivo Iztapa in summer 2010 to manage Deportivo Coatepeque for the 2010/2011 season.
