= Álvaro Hurtarte =

Guatemalan footballer

Personal information
- Full name: Álvaro Rodolfo Hurtarte Aguilar
- Date of birth: December 24, 1981 (age 44)
- Place of birth: Antigua Guatemala, Guatemala
- Height: 1.70 m (5 ft 7 in)
- Position: Midfielder

Team information
- Current team: Deportivo Xinabajul

Senior career*
Years	Team	Apps	(Gls)
2003–2005	Antigua GFC	63	(2)
2005–2008	Deportivo Marquense	44	(2)
2008–2009	Deportivo Petapa		
2009–present	Deportivo Xinabajul		

International career^{‡}
2004	Guatemala	1	(0)
- * Club domestic league appearances and goals as of 6 July 2010 ‡ National team caps and goals as of 6 July 2010

Álvaro Rodolfo Hurtarte Aguilar (born 24 December 1981) is a Guatemalan football midfielder who plays for local club Deportivo Xinabajul in the Guatemala's top division.

== Club career ==
Hurtarte started his professional career at his hometown club Antigua GFC and has played for Marquense and Petapa as well before joining Xinabajul in 2009.

== International career ==
He made his debut for Guatemala in a June 2004 FIFA World Cup qualification match against Surinam, coming on as a late substitute for Guillermo Ramírez. He did not win any more caps since.
