= San Benito, Guatemala =

San Benito
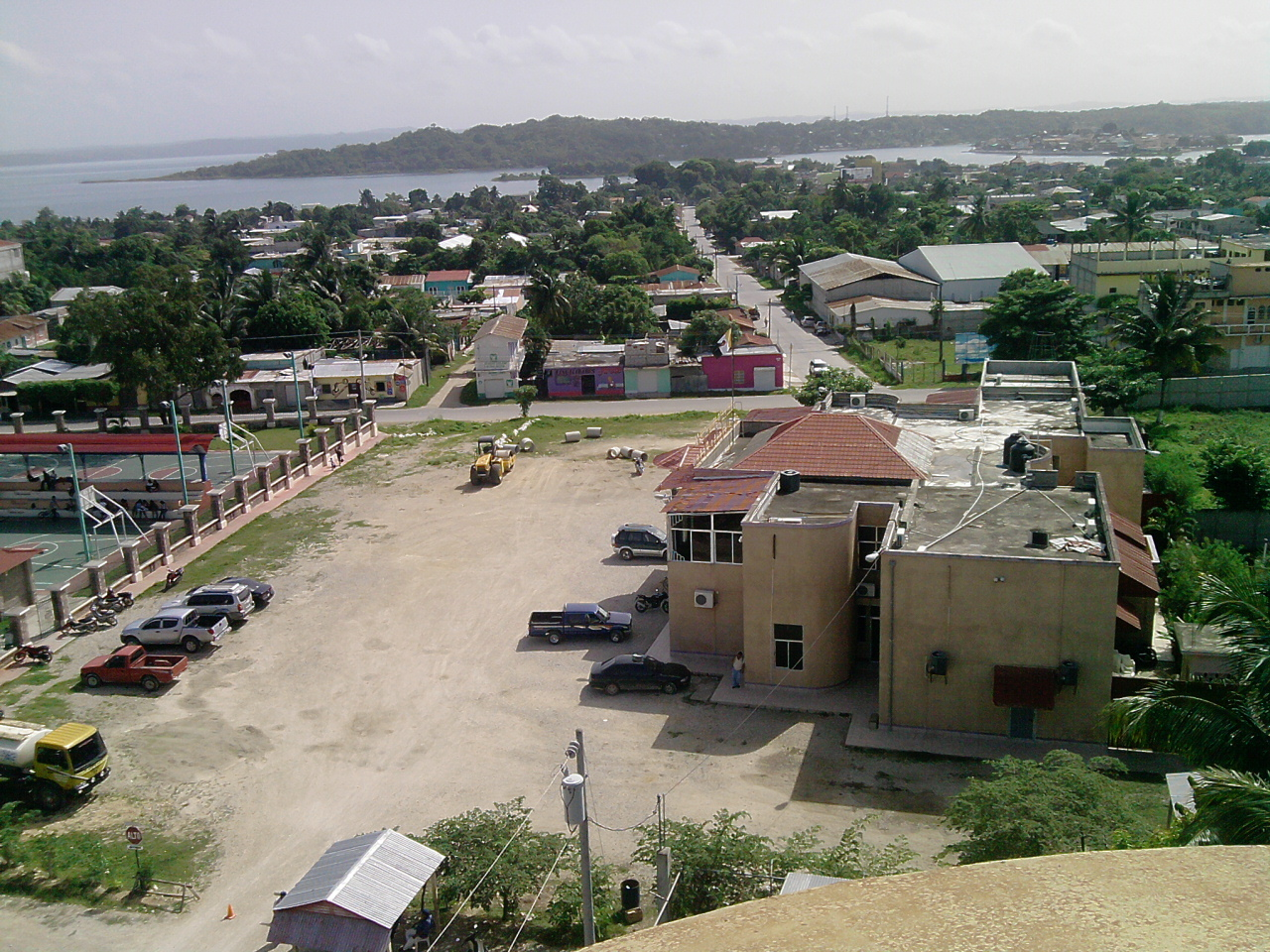

- Location in Guatemala
- Coordinates: 16°55′0″N 89°54′0″W
- Country: Guatemala
- Department: El Petén

Government
  - Mayor: Sonia de Pleitez (LIDER)

Area
  - Total: 43 sq mi (112 km^{2})
- Elevation: 449 ft (137 m)

Population (2012)
  - Total: 59,486
  - Density: 1,380/sq mi (531/km^{2})
- Climate: Aw

San Benito is a municipality in the El Petén department of Guatemala. It covers an area of 112 km^{2}, and had 29,926 inhabitants at the 2002 Census; the latest official estimate (as at mid 2012) was 59,486 people.

It is located adjacent to departmental capital Flores.

== History ==
San Benito was Originally founded under the name San José de Los Negros by the Spaniards who imported enslaved Africans from the Caribbean into the region including an estimated 100 slave fugitives from the neighboring Belize, who, upon their arrival declared their desire to convert to Catholicism, a key step in becoming recognized as faithful subjects of Spain.

With them the Christian Africans brought the image of Saint Benedict the Black, proclaiming him the patron saint of the place.

In response to protests from the local maya chiefs, Commander José de Gálvez ordered the relocation of the inhabitants to where the Barrio La Ermita is currently located near Petén’s fortress, leading to a name change to San Benito de Los Negros shortened to the common name San Benito.

In 2013 Mayor of San Benito Sonia Rivera attended a delegation where she met with Mayor of Belize City Darrell Bradley. Through acknowledgements of shared heritage and in the presence of congress from Guatemala City they declared San Benito and Belize City sister cities and established a formal friendship.

== Sports ==
Deportivo San Benito football club have been playing in the second tier of Guatemalan football since they clinched promotion from the third tier after the 1998/1999 season. They play their home games in the Estadio Alejandro Ochaeta Requena. Deportivo Don Bosco football club have been playing in the third tier of Guatemalan football since 2015/2016 season. They play their home games in the Estadio Alejandro Ochaeta Requena.
