= Javier Irazún =

Uruguayan footballer (born 1986)

Personal information
- Full name: Cono Javier Irazún González
- Date of birth: 4 December 1986 (age 39)
- Place of birth: Uruguay
- Position: Goalkeeper

Senior career*
Years	Team	Apps	(Gls)
-2010	CA Fénix	15+	(0+)
2010-2011	Danubio F.C.	0	(0)
2011-2013	Tacuarembó F.C.	14+	(0+)
2013-2016	Sud América	89	(0)
2016-2019	Comunicaciones	139	(0)
2019	Racing Club de Montevideo	13	(0)
2019-2020	C.D. Olmedo	4	(0)
2023-	Iztapa	0	(0)
- * Club domestic league appearances and goals

Javier Irazun (born 4 December 1986 in Uruguay) is a Uruguayan footballer who plays for Liga Nacional club Iztapa.

== Career ==
Irazun started his senior career with CA Fénix. In 2013, he signed for Sud América in the Uruguayan Primera División, where he made eighty-nine league appearances and scored zero goals. After that, he played for Comunicaciones, Racing Club de Montevideo, and C.D. Olmedo, where he now plays.
