= Erick Lemus =

Guatemalan footballer (born 2001)

Personal information
- Full name: Erick Diego Alejandro Lemus De Paz
- Date of birth: 5 February 2001 (age 25)
- Place of birth: Cuilapa, Guatemala
- Height: 1.73 m (5 ft 8 in)
- Position: Forward

Team information
- Current team: Comunicaciones
- Number: 25

Youth career
- Barberena
- Cuilapa FC
- –2021: Juventud Pinulteca

Senior career*
Years	Team	Apps	(Gls)
2021–2024	Achuapa	70	(20)
2024–	Comunicaciones	59	(21)

International career^{‡}
2023	Guatemala U23	3	(0)
2024–	Guatemala	4	(1)
- * Club domestic league appearances and goals as of 20:00, 15 March 2026 (UTC) ‡ National team caps and goals as of 20:00, 24 June 2025 (UTC)

Erick Diego Alejandro Lemus De Paz (Spanish pronunciation: [eɾˈik djˈeɣo ˌalexˈandɾo lˈemus dˈe pˈaθ]; born 5 February 2001), nicknamed El Kuki, is a Guatemalan professional footballer who plays as a forward for Liga Guate club Comunicaciones and the Guatemala national team.

== Early life ==
Erick Lemus started his youth career in Guatemala, joining clubs such as Barberena, Cuilapa FC and Juventud Pinulteca.

== Club career ==
=== Achuapa ===
==== 2021–22: Debut season ====
Erick Lemus would begin his Liga Nacional career with Achuapa in 2021. He would make his debut on 11 August 2021. He would score his first goal on 11 September 2021 in a 2–0 victory against Iztapa.

==== 2022–23: First hat-trick and third top goalscorer ====
During the 2023 Clausura, on 15 April 2023, he would score his first hat-trick against Guastatoya in a 3–2 victory. At the end of the 2023 Clausura, he would be tied in third place for top scorer with 8 goals.

==== 2023–24: Final season and departure ====
In his first appearance in the 2023–24 Apertura on 11 August 2023, he would score a last-minute winning goal in a 3–2 win against Zacapa. He finished the 2023–24 season with 11 goals in 32 appearances across all competitions.

=== Comunicaciones ===
==== 2024–25: Debut season and top goalscorer ====
In May 2024, Lemus was signed by Comunicaciones ahead of the 2024-25 Liga Nacional season as a free transfer. He would finish the 2024 Liga Nacional Apertura as the top scorer with 9 goals, earning the Liga Nacional Top Scorer award. He would break a 38-year absence of top scorer by a Comunicaciones player born in Guatemala, with the last player being Raúl Chacón in 1986.

==== 2025–26 ====
On 20 July 2025, Lemus scored his first goal of the season in a 2–0 win over Mictlán.

== International career ==
=== Youth career ===
==== 2023: Central American and Caribbean Games ====
Erick Lemus began his international career representing Guatemala's national under-23 team three times at the 2023 Central American and Caribbean Games.

=== Senior career ===
==== 2023: First call-up ====
Erick Lemus was first called up to the Guatemala national team in November 2023 for a friendly against Jamaica, however due to visa issues he was left out of the squad.

==== 2024–present: Beginnings and first goal ====
He would be called up once again for a friendly against Uruguay in August 2024. He would make his international debut in that match in which Guatemala tied 1-1. Lemus was once again called up in September after Comunicaciones and national teammate Carlos Mejia got injured and replaced him for the 2024–25 CONCACAF Nations League. On 25 March 2025, he would score his debut international goal in a 2025 CONCACAF Gold Cup qualification match against Guyana. The match ended 2–0, helping Guatemala secure a spot at the 2025 CONCACAF Gold Cup.

== Career statistics ==
=== Club ===
As of match played 15 March 2025

Appearances and goals by club, season and competition
Club	Season	League			Domestic Cup		Continental		Other		Total	
Club	Season	Division	Apps	Goals	Apps	Goals	Apps	Goals	Apps	Goals	Apps	Goals
Achuapa	2021-22	Liga Nacional	16	1	—		—		—		16	1
Achuapa	2022-23	Liga Nacional	22	8	—		—		—		22	8
Achuapa	2023-24	Liga Nacional	32	11	—		—		—		32	11
Achuapa	Total		70	20	0	0	0	0	0	0	70	20
Comunicaciones	2024-25	Liga Nacional	37	18	—		8 (Note: Appearance(s) in CONCACAF Central American Cup)	0	—		45	18
Comunicaciones	2025-26	Liga Nacional	22	3	—		—		—		22	3
Comunicaciones	Total		59	21	0	0	8	0	0	0	67	21
Career Total			129	41	0	0	8	0	0	0	137	41

=== International ===
As of match played 24 June 2025

Appearances and goals by national team and year
National team	Year	Apps	Goals
Guatemala	2024	1	0
Guatemala	2025	3	1
Total		4	1

As of match played 25 March 2025
Guatemala score listed first, score column indicates score after each Lemus goal

List of international goals scored by Erick Lemus
No.	Date	Venue	Cap	Opponent	Score	Result	Competition	Ref.
1	25 March 2025	Estadio Cementos Progreso, Guatemala City, Guatemala	2	Guyana	2–0	2–0	2025 CONCACAF Gold Cup qualification	

== Honours ==
Individual

- Liga Nacional Top Scorer: Apertura 2024
