= Sixto Betancourt =

Guatemalan football defender

Personal information
- Full name: Sixto Ubaldo Betancourt Véliz
- Date of birth: 16 May 1992 (age 34)
- Place of birth: Tiquisate, Guatemala
- Height: 1.79 m (5 ft 10 1/2 in)
- Position: Left-back

Team information
- Current team: Achuapa
- Number: 19

Youth career
- 2011: Suchitepéquez

Senior career*
Years	Team	Apps	(Gls)
2011–2012	Juventud Retalteca	16	(0)
2012–2013	Malacateco	39	(0)
2013–2016	Municipal	69	(0)
2014	→ Cartaginés (loan)	9	(0)
2015	→ Plaza Colonia (loan)	9	(0)
2016–2017	Antigua	43	(1)
2017–2022	Malacateco	199	(4)
2022–2023	Santa Lucía	25	(0)
2023–2024	Coatepeque	20	(0)
2024–	Achuapa	0	(0)

International career
2009	Guatemala U17	?	(?)
2011	Guatemala U20	3	(0)
2021–	Guatemala	1	(0)
- * Club domestic league appearances and goals as of 22 January 2021

Sixto Betancourt (born 16 May 1992) is a Guatemalan professional footballer who plays as a left-back for Liga Guate club Achuapa.

== Club career ==
Betancourt made his professional debut with Juventud Retalteca on 5 February 2012 against Suchitepéquez in a 3–1 away loss.

In August 2014, he was sent on loan to Costa Rican side C.S. Cartaginés.

In February 2015, he was sent again on loan but now to Uruguayan club Plaza Colonia.

Betancourt played a key role during his time at Malacateco as he captained his team to their first Liga Nacional title during the Apertura 2021 season.

== International career ==
Betancourt has played for Guatemala at various youth levels, appearing first for the U17 team at the 2009 CONCACAF U-17 Championship. He also played with the U20 team at the 2011 CONCACAF U-20 Championship helping his country to qualify for the first time to the U-20 World Cup, where he played too.

He made his debut for the senior squad on 22 January 2021 in a friendly game against Puerto Rico, he played the full game.

== Honours ==
Antigua

- Liga Nacional de Guatemala: Apertura 2017

Malacateco

- Liga Nacional de Guatemala: Apertura 2021
