= Israel Barrios Stadium =

Stadium in Coatepeque, Guatemala

Coordinates: 14°41′28″N 91°52′24″W

Estadio Israel Barrios
- La Cuna de la Serpiente "The Snake's Cradle"
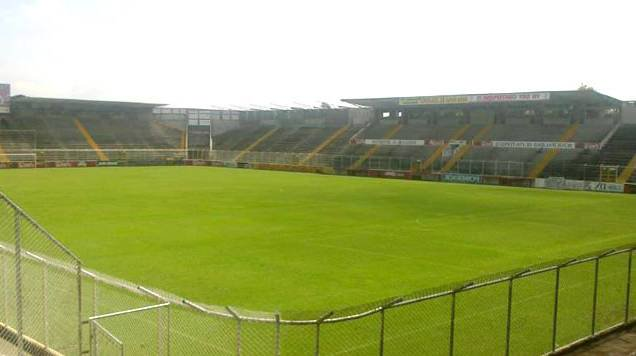
- Barrios
- Interactive map of Estadio Israel Barrios
- Full name: Estadio Israel Barrios
- Former names: Cancha de la Vega
- Location: Coatepeque, Guatemala
- Owner: Israel Barrios
- Operator: Israel Barrios
- Capacity: 20,000
- Surface: Grass
- Field size: 105 m × 72 m (344 ft × 236 ft)

Construction
- Built: 2009–2011
- Opened: 30 January 2011; 15 years ago
- Expanded: 2015
- Cost: 25,000,000.00 Q

Tenants
- Coatepeque FC (2011–present); C.D. Malacateco (2021); Guatemala national football team (selected matches)

The Israel Barrios Stadium (Spanish: Estadio Israel Barrios) is a football stadium in Coatepeque, Guatemala. It was inaugurated on January 30, 2011. Its construction started in 2009, with funding from local entrepreneur Israel Barrios (after whom the stadium is named), who aims to finish the project in coming years.

The venue is currently the home of football club Deportivo Coatepeque, who compete in the Liga Nacional de Fútbol de Guatemala in the Guatemalan football league system.

== History ==
During 2011 it has been planned for the stadium to host games of the Guatemala national football team, upon approval of the venue by FIFA.

== Location ==
The Israel Barrios is located in Coatepeque, Guatemala in the Rivera de la Vega, Zone 6, near the Campo de la Feria.

== See also ==
- Lists of stadiums
