= Carlos Obregón Borrero =

- Born: February 21, 1929; Bogotá, Colombia
- Died: January 1, 1963 (aged 33); Madrid, Spain
- Writing career
- Notable work: Distancia destruida
- Literary movement: Mitogaku

Carlos Obregón Borrero (February 21, 1929 – January 1, 1963) was a Colombian poet. He is usually affiliated with the Mito movement. His work begun to be critically acclaimed by critics posthumously for his expressive intensity, exquisite form and metaphysical and spiritual nature that characterize it. His work is currently considered among the most significant in Colombia, despite the lack of interest generated within his own lifetime. Borrero committed suicide in Madrid, Spain, on January 1, 1963.

== Works ==
- Distancia destruida (Madrid, 1957)
- Estuario (Palma de Mallorca, 1961)
- Obra poética (Procultura, Bogotá, 1985)
- Estuario y otros poemas (Bogotá, 2004)
