= CSD Sayaxché =

Association football club in Guatemala

Sayaxché
- Full name: Club Social y Deportivo Sayaxché
- Founded: 17 May 2002; 24 years ago
- Ground: Estadio Municipal La Pasión
- Capacity: 4,000
- Chairman: Erick Morán
- Manager: Melvin Téllez
- League: Segunda División de Ascenso
Home colours	Away colours

Club Social y Deportivo Sayaxché is a Guatemalan football club based in Sayaxché, Petén Department.

Founded in 2003 the team plays their home games in the Estadio Municipal La Pasión.

The team's colours are green, red and white.

== Squad 2013 ==
- Carlos Díaz
- Moisés Carménate
- Jimmy Flores
- Milton López
- Daniel Zegarra
- Enrique Flores
- Edwin Garrido
- Robin García
- Nathan García
- Ludwin Villeda
- Darin Medrano
- Yony Valenzuela
- Gerson Castellanos
- Jardy López
- Gilberth Artavia
- Cándido Ondo
- Christian Flores
