= Coatepeque, Quetzaltenango =

Coatepeque
- Municipality and town
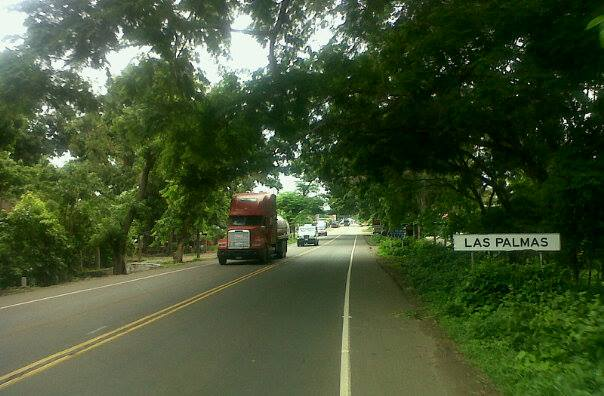
- Aldea Las Palmas

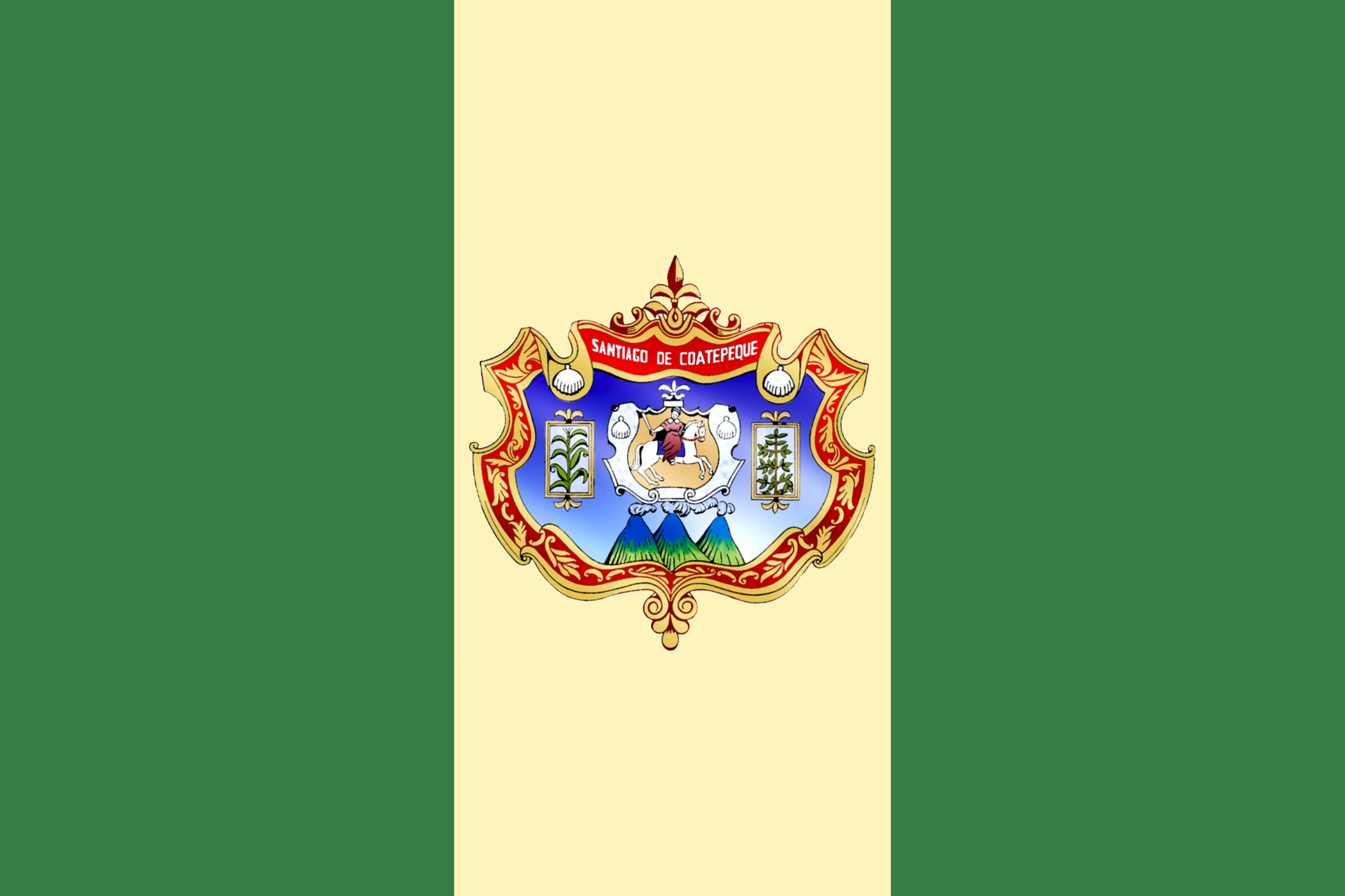
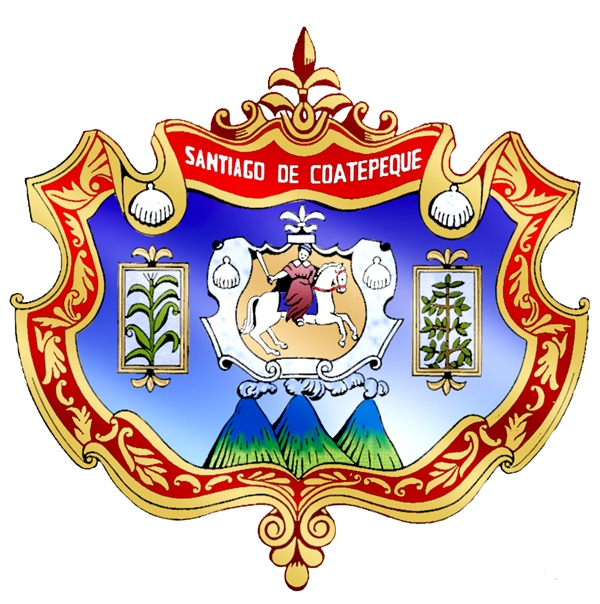
- Flag Seal

- Location within Guatemala Location within Quetzaltenango Department
- Coordinates: 14°42′N 91°52′W
- Country: Guatemala
- Department: Quetzaltenango

Area
  - Total: 426 km^{2} (164 sq mi)
- Elevation: 498 m (1,634 ft)

Population (2018 census)
  - Total: 105,415
  - Density: 247/km^{2} (641/sq mi)
- Time zone: UTC+6 (Central Time)
- Climate: Am

Coatepeque (Spanish pronunciation: [koateˈpeke]), also known as Village of gardenias, is a town and municipality in the Quetzaltenango department of Guatemala. According to the 2018 census, the town of Coatepeque had a population of 37,330.

Coatepeque sits near the Suchiate River and is a transportation center on the Pacific Coast Highway.

== Climate ==
Coatepeque has a tropical monsoon climate (Am) with moderate to little rainfall from December to March and heavy to very heavy rainfall from April to November.

Climate data for Coatepeque
Month	Jan	Feb	Mar	Apr	May	Jun	Jul	Aug	Sep	Oct	Nov	Dec	Year
Mean daily maximum °C (°F)	30.4 (86.7)	30.8 (87.4)	32.3 (90.1)	32.2 (90.0)	32.0 (89.6)	30.6 (87.1)	31.4 (88.5)	31.5 (88.7)	30.9 (87.6)	30.2 (86.4)	30.4 (86.7)	30.1 (86.2)	31.1 (87.9)
Daily mean °C (°F)	24.0 (75.2)	24.3 (75.7)	25.7 (78.3)	26.2 (79.2)	26.3 (79.3)	25.5 (77.9)	25.9 (78.6)	26.0 (78.8)	25.7 (78.3)	25.0 (77.0)	24.9 (76.8)	24.1 (75.4)	25.3 (77.5)
Mean daily minimum °C (°F)	17.6 (63.7)	17.9 (64.2)	19.1 (66.4)	20.3 (68.5)	20.6 (69.1)	20.5 (68.9)	20.4 (68.7)	20.5 (68.9)	20.5 (68.9)	19.9 (67.8)	19.5 (67.1)	18.2 (64.8)	19.6 (67.2)
Average precipitation mm (inches)	18 (0.7)	24 (0.9)	68 (2.7)	195 (7.7)	417 (16.4)	666 (26.2)	496 (19.5)	614 (24.2)	694 (27.3)	648 (25.5)	154 (6.1)	37 (1.5)	4,031 (158.7)
Source: Climate-Data.org

== Structures ==
Archaeology

Takalik Abaj is nearby.

== Events ==
Sports

Deportivo Coatepeque football club play in the Liga Nacional (the Major National League) of Guatemalan Football. The Serpientes Rojas play their home games in the Israel Barrios Stadium (capacity 24,000, natural grass turf).

== Geographic location ==
The Coatepeque urban area has 22 neighborhoods, and its rural area has 15 middle sized villages and 25 small sized ones. It is located 40 kilometers south west from Quetzaltenango city.
