= Pablo Garabello =

Argentine football manager

Personal information
- Full name: Pablo Javier Garabello
- Date of birth: 3 September 1973 (age 53)
- Place of birth: Buenos Aires, Argentina
- Position: Midfielder

Team information
- Current team: Iztapa (manager)

Youth career
- Los Andes
- San Lorenzo
- River Plate
- Argentinos Juniors

Senior career*
Years	Team	Apps	(Gls)
1995–1998	Florida Strikers		
1999–2000	San Martín de Burzaco	19	(0)
2000	Barracas Central		

Managerial career
- River Plate (youth)
- 2003–2004: JJ Urquiza
- 2005: Argentino de Merlo (assistant)
- 2006: San Miguel (assistant)
- 2006–2007: Excursionistas (assistant)
- 2007–2008: Toluca (assistant)
- 2009: Tigres UANL (assistant)
- 2011: Leandro N. Alem
- 2012–2018: Colombia (assistant)
- 2019: Cúcuta Deportivo
- 2020: Fortaleza CEIF
- 2021: UTC
- 2022: Los Chankas
- 2023–: Iztapa
- * Club domestic league appearances and goals

Pablo Javier Garabello (born 3 September 1973) is an Argentine football manager and former player who played as a midfielder. He is the current manager for Liga Nacional club Iztapa.

== Playing career ==
Born in Buenos Aires, Garabello represented Los Andes, San Lorenzo, River Plate and Argentinos Juniors as a youth. He made his senior debut with American side Florida Strikers, before playing for local sides San Martín de Burzaco and Barracas Central before retiring.

== Managerial career ==
After managing River Plate's youth sides, Garabello started his managerial career with JJ Urquiza in 2003. After working as an assistant manager at Argentino de Merlo, San Miguel and Excursionistas, he joined José Pékerman's staff at Toluca in 2007.

Garabello worked as Pékerman's assistant in 2009 at Tigres UANL before being named manager of Leandro N. Alem in December 2010. He resigned from the club the following 9 May, after a 1–3 loss against Talleres de Remedios de Escalada.

In 2012, Garabello returned to work with Pékerman as his assistant in the Colombia national team. On 10 May 2019, he was named manager of Colombian side Cúcuta Deportivo, but left in a mutual consent on 13 August.

In February 2020, Garabello was appointed manager of Categoría Primera B side Fortaleza. On 3 December, he took over Peruvian side UTC.
