= Silvio Fernández (footballer) =

Uruguayan footballer (born 1974)

Personal information
- Full name: Silvio Daer Fernández Dos Santos
- Date of birth: 3 June 1974 (age 52)
- Place of birth: Melo, Uruguay
- Height: 1.83 m (6 ft 0 in)
- Position: Striker

Team information
- Current team: Coatepeque FC (manager)

Youth career
- Boca Juniors Melo
- Nacional

Senior career*
Years	Team	Apps	(Gls)
1996–1997	Nacional	21	(3)
1998	Defensor Sporting		
1999–2000	Villa Española		
2000	Provincial Osorno	20	(10)
2001–2002	Santiago Wanderers	61	(38)
2003	Chiapas	9	(2)
2003	Colo-Colo	35	(10)
2004	Universidad de Concepción	14	(1)
2005	Palestino	11	(1)
2005	Rangers	19	(7)
2006	Santiago Wanderers	16	(5)
2006	Central Español	5	(0)
2007	Hispano		
2008	Racing Montevideo		
2008–2010	Deportivo Xinabajul	47	(7)
2010	Cerro Largo		

Managerial career
- 2012: Atlético Fernandino (youth)
- 2013: Xinabajul (assistant)
- 2013: Huehue FC
- 2013: Huehueteco (assistant)
- 2013: Huehueteco
- 2015: General Velásquez
- 2016: Quintero Unido
- 2016–2017: Santiago Wanderers (youth)
- 2017: Santiago Wanderers (caretaker)
- 2018: Santiago Wanderers (assistant)
- 2019: Deportivo Catocha
- 2020: Xinabajul Huehue
- 2020–2021: Portosantense (technical director)
- 2021–2022: Xinabajul Huehue
- 2023: Deportivo San Pedro
- 2024: Coatepeque FC
- 2025: Juticalpa
- 2025–: Huehueteco
- * Club domestic league appearances and goals

Silvio Daer Fernández Dos Santos (born June 3, 1974, in Melo, Uruguay) is a Uruguayan former footballer who played as a striker.

== Playing career ==
Fernández started his career with Nacional in 1996.

Fernández highlighted as a player for Chilean club Santiago Wanderers after winning the 2001 Primera División.

== Coaching career ==
Fernández started his coaching career with the Atlético Fernandino youth ranks in his homeland. After working in Guatemala, Fernández moved to Chile in 2015 and signed with General Velásquez alongside his former teammate in Santiago Wanderers, Jaime Riveros.

In April 2017, he assumed as coach of the Santiago Wanderers first team after Eduardo Espinel was released.

In 2020, he moved back to work to Guatemala.

During 2025, Fernández led Juticalpa and Huehueteco.

== Honours ==
=== Player ===
Nacional

- Uruguayan Primera División (2): 1996 Clausura, 1997 Apertura
- Torneo Liguilla Pre-Libertadores (1): 1996

Santiago Wanderers

- Primera División de Chile (1): 2001
- Liguilla Pre-Sudamericana (1): 2002

Racing Club de Montevideo

- Uruguayan Segunda División (1): 2007–08
