= Raúl Arias =

Mexican footballer and manager (born 1957)

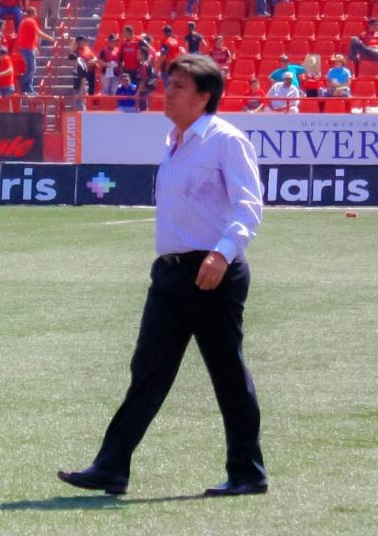

Personal information
- Full name: Raúl Arias Rosas
- Date of birth: 29 October 1957 (age 68)
- Place of birth: Mexico City, Mexico
- Position: Defender

Senior career*
Years	Team	Apps	(Gls)
1977–1978	Tampico Madero	2	
1979–1981	Atletico Potosino	127	(14)
1982–1984	Puebla	68	(12)
1984–1985	Tigres UANL	27	
1986–1987	León	29	(1)
1987–1988	Atlante	32	(1)
1988–1989	Cruz Azul	12	
1989–1991	Correcaminos	57	(1)
1991–1992	Puebla	8	

International career
1983	Mexico	2	(1)

Managerial career
- 1996-1997: Correcaminos
- 1998–2005: Necaxa
- 2005–2008: San Luis
- 2008: Necaxa
- 2009: Guadalajara
- 2011: Tecos UAG
- 2012: Cienciano
- 2015: Atlético San Luis
- 2021–2022: Achuapa
- 2023: Achuapa
- 2023–2024: FAS
- * Club domestic league appearances and goals

Raúl Arias Rosas (born 29 October 1957) is a Mexican former professional footballer and manager.

== Career ==
He played with various clubs, including Tampico Madero, Atletico Potosino, Club Puebla, Tigres UANL, Club León, Atlante F.C., Cruz Azul, Correcaminos UAT and once again with Club Puebla, where he officially retired. He won the 1982–83 league title with Puebla where he is still remembered for being a great defensive player. After he retired he took up coaching, and coached Club Necaxa from 1998 to 2005. He led Necaxa to third place in the 2000 FIFA Club World Championship, defeating Real Madrid CF on the way. In 2006, he coached San Luis till 2009 when he returned to coach Club Necaxa who would eventually be relegated to the second division. In 2009, he had a short stay with Chivas.

== International ==
Raul was capped twice for the Mexico national team he played versus Canada and Martinique. he scored his first goal in a 5–0 win versus Canada in the Estadio Sergio León Chávez on 3 December 1983

== Honours ==
=== Player ===
Puebla

- Mexican Primera División: 1982–83

=== Manager ===
Necaxa

- Mexican Primera División: Invierno 1998
- CONCACAF Champions' Cup: 1999
- FIFA Club World Cup Third Place: 2000
