= Amarini Villatoro =

Guatemalan football coach (born 1981)

Personal information
- Full name: Marvin Amarini Villatoro de León
- Date of birth: 8 July 1981 (age 45)
- Place of birth: Cobán, Guatemala

Managerial career
- Years: Team
- Los Potros del Tecnológico
- 2009–2011: Sayaxché
- 2011–2012: Cobán Imperial
- 2013: Sayaxché
- 2013–2014: Carcha
- 2015: Jocotán
- 2016–2019: Guastatoya
- 2019–2021: Guatemala
- 2021–2022: Pérez Zeledón
- 2022–2025: Xelajú
- 2026-: Cartaginés

Marvin Amarini Villatoro de León (born May 6, 1985) is a Guatemalan professional football manager who is current manager of Cartaginés.

== Managerial career ==
In 2006, Villatoro joined the coaching staff at Costa Rican club Pérez Zeledón. In 2008, Villatoro achieved promotion to the Guatemalan Segunda División de Ascenso with Los Potros del Tecnológico. In 2009, Villatoro was appointed manager of Sayaxché, helping to the club gain promotion to the Primera División de Ascenso during his time at the club. Following his time at Sayaxché, Villatoro managed Cobán Imperial, Deportivo Carchá and Deportivo Jocotán. In May 2016, Villatoro was appointed manager at Guastatoya. In 2018, Guastatoya won their first Liga Nacional de Fútbol de Guatemala, with Villatoro becoming the youngest ever coach to do so.

In March 2019, Villatoro was appointed manager of Guatemala. In 2021, he was sacked after Guatemala failed to qualify for both the 2022 FIFA World Cup and the 2021 CONCACAF Gold Cup.
