= San Benito FC =

Association football club in Guatemala

San Benito
- Full name: San Benito Fútbol Club
- Nickname: La Furia Verde (The Green Fury)
- Founded: 1993
- Ground: Estadio Alejandro Ochaeta Requena, San Benito, Guatemala
- Capacity: 3,000
- Chairman: (Guatemala) Carlos Kuylin
- Manager: (Guatemala) Erick Marquez
- League: Primera División de Ascenso
- 2010 Clausura Grupo B: 9th

San Benito Fútbol Club, is a Guatemalan professional football club based in San Benito, Petén Department.

They play their home games in the Estadio Alejandro Ochaeta Requena.

== History ==
Founded only in 1993 as Deportivo San Benito, they have been playing in the second tier of Guatemalan football since they clinched promotion from the third tier after the 1998/1999 season. They were renamed Petén FC in summer 2010.

== Current squad ==
Note: Flags indicate national team as defined under FIFA eligibility rules; some limited exceptions apply. Players may hold more than one non-FIFA nationality.

No.	Pos.	Nation	Player
—		GUA	Jaime Pelaez
—		GUA	Eddy Marroquín
—		GUA	Osman Dubón
—		GUA	José Alberto Marquez
—		GUA	Luis Fernando Alonso
—		GUA	Oswaldo Carrera
—		COL	Rodolfo Ferrer
—		GUA	Luis Enrique Mas
—		GUA	Juan Carlos Valenzuela
—		GUA	Jardy López
—		GUA	Juan Requena
—		GUA	Arnoldo Hernández
—		GUA	Francisco Guerra
—		GUA	Pedro Pérez
—		GUA	Israel Hernández
—		PAN	David Barahona
—		GUA	Belmant Avelar

No.	Pos.	Nation	Player
—		GUA	Dennis Sarg
—		GUA	César Bol
—		GUA	William Montepeque
—		GUA	Kendell Baños
—		GUA	Carlos Obregon
—		MEX	Gerardo Bustos
—		GUA	Miguel Artola
—		GUA	Ludwin Villeda
—		GUA	Antonio Sarg
—		GUA	Marcos Reyes
—		GUA	Christian Canchan
—		GUA	Hary Pineta
—		GUA	Jonas Chub
—		GUA	José Mario Lima
—		GUA	Jim Flores
—		GUA	Pedro Castellanos
—		GUA	Jonathan Mendoza

== List of coaches ==
- (Guatemala) Mario Zelaya (1993)
- (Guatemala) Julio Gómez (2007–08)
