= Robin Betancourth =

Guatemalan footballer

Personal information
- Full name: Robin Osvaldo Betancourth Cué
- Date of birth: 25 November 1991 (age 34)
- Place of birth: Petén, Guatemala
- Height: 5 ft 10 in (1.78 m)
- Position: Forward

Team information
- Current team: Atlético Mictlán
- Number: 99

Youth career
- Heredia

Senior career*
Years	Team	Apps	(Gls)
2011–2013	Heredia	60	(21)
2014–2015	Xelajú	42	(4)
2015–2018	Cobán Imperial	130	(33)
2018–2019	Comunicaciones	59	(8)
2020–2021	Antigua	31	(7)
2021–2023	Cobán Imperial	97	(21)
2023	Monagas	12	(0)
2024–2025	Guastatoya	43	(8)
2025–	Atlético Mictlán	21	(1)

International career
2013–2023	Guatemala	26	(2)
- * Club domestic league appearances and goals as of 11 March 2026

Robin Osvaldo Betancourth Cué (born 25 November 1991) is a Guatemalan professional footballer who plays as a forward for Liga Guate club Atlético Mictlán.

== Early life ==
Born in Petén, Guatemala, Betancourth, who plays as a forward, joined his local side, Heredia Jaguares de Peten as a teenager.

== Club career ==
=== Heredia ===
He made his professional debut for Heredia in 2011 at the age of 19.

Betancourth captured the Apertura 2012 scoring title the same day he turned 21 years old, capping off a 13-goal season.

He finished the 2012 Apertura/Clausura with 20 goals in 38 appearances.

=== Comunicaciones ===
On 24 May 2018, Betancourth confirmed that he had officially signed for Comunicaciones.

On 6 January 2020, Betancourth confirmed on social media that he would no longer continue with Comunicaciones.

=== Antigua ===
Few days after departing from Comunicaciones, Antigua announced they had signed Betancourth.

=== Atlético Mictlán ===
On 11 June 2025, it was confirmed that Betancourth would join newly promoted Atlético Mictlán.

== International career ==
Robin Betancourth has represented Guatemala at the U20 and Senior level. He made his national team debut for the senior national team a friendly against Panama on 10 January 2013.

== Honours ==
Cobán Imperial

- Liga Nacional: 2022 Apertura
