= José Ángel Rossi Stadium =

Stadium in Cobán, Guatemala

Coordinates: 15.4762068°N 90.3769094°W

Estadio Jose Angel Rossi
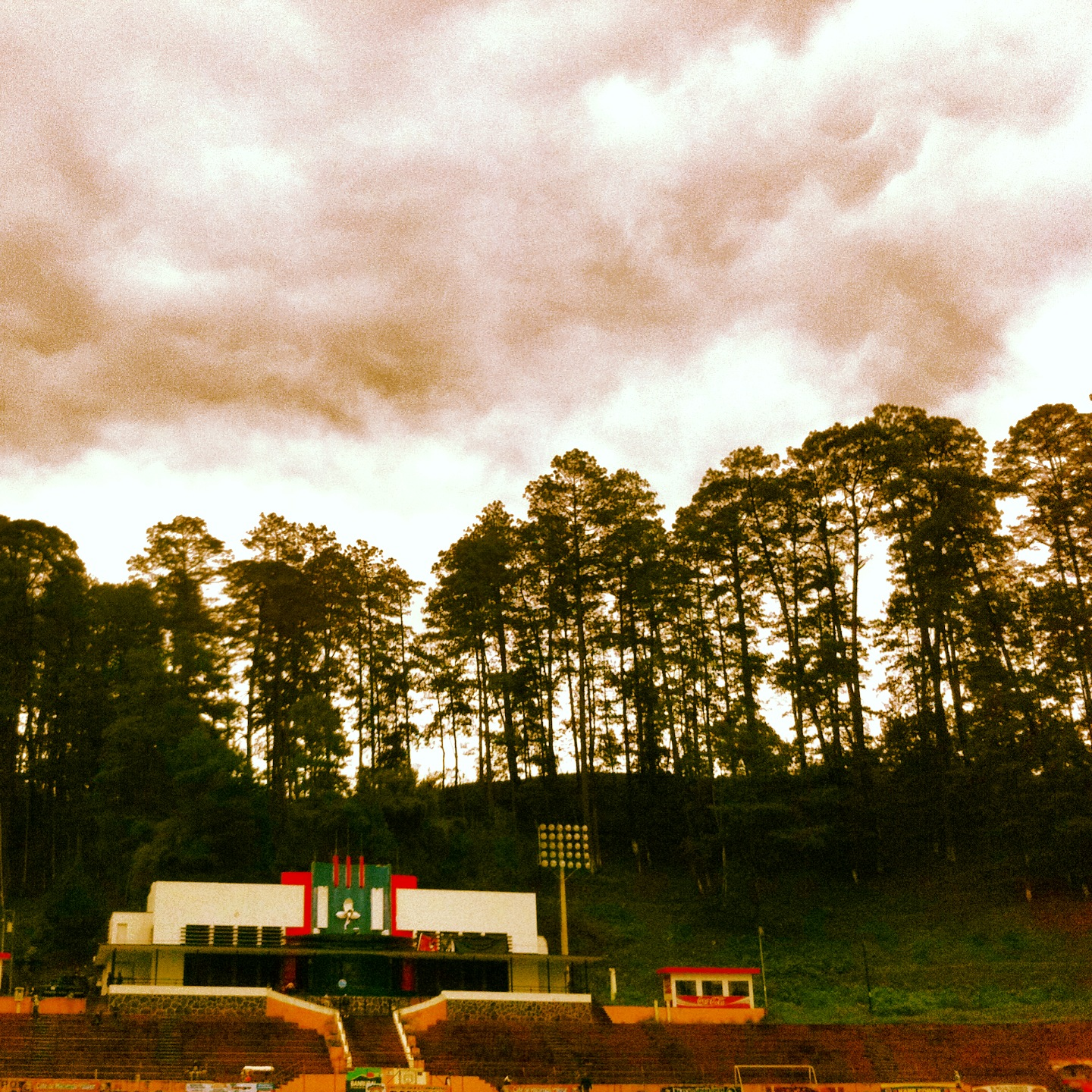
- Interactive map of Estadio Jose Angel Rossi
- Location: Cobán, Guatemala
- Owner: Municipality of Cobán
- Capacity: 15,000
- Surface: Grass
- Record attendance: 40,000
- Field size: 104 m × 68 m (341 ft × 223 ft)

Construction
- Opened: 1 August 1936; 90 years ago
- Cost: Q 3.000.000

Tenant
- CD Cobán Imperial (1936–present)

The Verapaz José Ángel Rossi Ponce Stadium (Spanish: Estadio Verapaz José Ángel Rossi Ponce) is a football stadium in the city of Cobán in Guatemala.

It was inaugurated on 1 August 1936 and has a capacity of 15,000. It is home to Liga Guate club Cobán Imperial.

== See also ==
- Lists of stadiums
