= Winston Pineda Stadium =

Stadium in Jutiapa, Guatemala

Coordinates: 14.2948°N 89.8937°W

Estadio Winston Pineda
- Interactive map of Estadio Winston Pineda
- Location: Jutiapa, Guatemala
- Owner: Municipality of Jutiapa
- Capacity: 7,300
- Surface: Grass
- Field size: 104 m × 68 m (341 ft × 223 ft)

Construction
- Opened: 1982

Tenant
- Achuapa (2022–2026)

The Winston Pineda Stadium (Spanish: Estadio Winston Pineda) is a soccer stadium in Jutiapa, Guatemala. The stadium, also known as "El Cóndor", opened in 1982. It is home to Liga Nacional club Achuapa and has a maximum capacity of 7,300 people.

== See also ==
- Lists of stadiums
