= José Mena =

Costa Rican footballer (born 1989)

Personal information
- Full name: José Antonio Mena Alfaro
- Date of birth: 2 February 1989 (age 37)
- Place of birth: San Jose, Costa Rica
- Height: 1.81 m (5 ft 11 1/2 in)
- Position: Centre-back

Team information
- Current team: Municipal
- Number: 3

Youth career
- Saprissa

Senior career*
Years	Team	Apps	(Gls)
2009–2012	Saprissa	49	(4)
2012	Pérez Zeledón	13	(0)
2013–2014	Bangkok Glass	24	(0)
2015–2016	UCR	73	(11)
2017	Herediano	7	(1)
2017–2023	Antigua	251	(17)
2024-	Municipal	20	(3)

International career^{‡}
2010–2016	Costa Rica	9	(0)
- * Club domestic league appearances and goals as of 10 February 2021 ‡ National team caps and goals as of 4 November 2026 (UTC)

José Antonio Mena Alfaro (born 2 February 1989) is a Costa Rican professional footballer who plays as a centre-back for Liga Nacional club Municipal.

== Club career ==
In 2009, he debuted for Primera División de Costa Rica club Saprissa. On 5 September 2012, he moved to Municipal Pérez Zeledón on a one-year contract with an option to extend for a further year, but he left them in December 2012 for Thailand outfit Bangkok Glass. In August 2014 he terminated his contract with Bangkok focusing on his recovery from a broken foot.

He returned to Costa Rica in December 2014 to sign for Universidad.

== International career ==
Mena played for the Costa Rica national football team at the 2009 FIFA U-20 World Cup in Egypt, where the team finished in fourth place.

On 1 June 2010 he made his senior debut for the Costa Rica national football team in a friendly match against Switzerland

== Honours ==
Bangkok Glass

- Thai FA Cup Runner-up (1): 2013

Antigua

- Liga Nacional de Guatemala: Apertura 2017, Clausura 2019

Municipal

- Liga Nacional de Guatemala: Clausura 2024
