= Estadio Los Cuchumatanes =

Stadium in Huehuetenango, Guatemala

Coordinates: 15°19′15″N 91°28′54″W

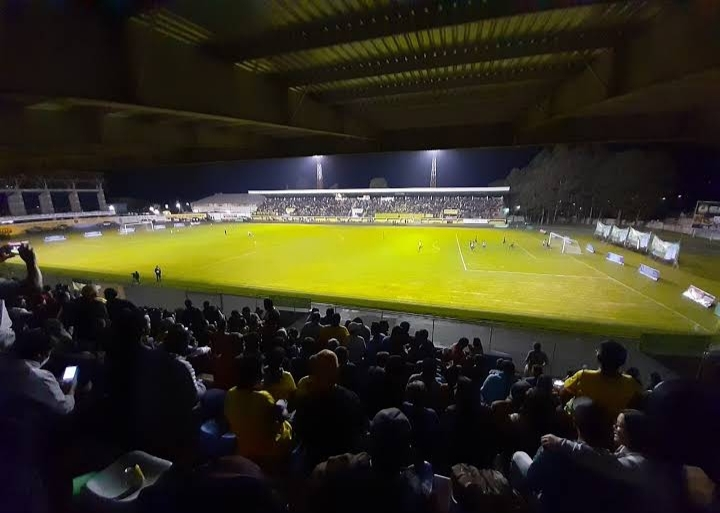
- Interactive map of Estadio Los Cuchumatanes
- Location: Huehuetenango, Guatemala
- Owner: Municipalidad de Huehuetenango
- Capacity: 5,340
- Surface: Grass
- Field size: 104 m × 68 m (341 ft × 223 ft)

Construction
- Opened: January 17, 2000
- Renovated: 2007, 2025–present
- Cost: Q 26,000,000

Tenants
- CSD Xinabajul (2000–2025); Guatemala national football team (selected matches)

Estadio Los Cuchumatanes is a football stadium located in Huehuetenango, Guatemala. It was home to Liga Nacional club Xinabajul. Its capacity is around 5,340. The stadium opened its doors on January 17, 2007.
