= Jonatan Morán =

Argentine professional footballer

Personal information
- Full name: Jonatan Alberto Morán
- Date of birth: 14 April 1989 (age 37)
- Place of birth: Viedma, Argentina
- Height: 1.86 m (6 ft 1 in)
- Position: Forward

Team information
- Current team: Xelajú
- Number: 9

Senior career*
Years	Team	Apps	(Gls)
2011	Mérida	8	(0)
2013–2014	25 de Mayo	11	(1)
2014–2016	Deportivo Roca	49	(9)
2016	→ Alvarado (loan)	0	(0)
2016–2017	Gimnasia y Esgrima	7	(0)
2017–2018	Cipolletti	18	(4)
2018–2019	Barracas Central	15	(1)
2019	La Amistad		
2020	Real Pilar	8	(1)
2021	Deportivo Merlo	28	(11)
2022	Los Andes	23	(10)
2023	Guastatoya	46	(13)
2024–	Xelajú	15	(5)
- * Club domestic league appearances and goals as of 18:35, 6 June 2024 (UTC)

Jonatan Alberto Morán (born 14 April 1989) is an Argentine professional footballer who plays as a forward for Liga Nacional club Xelajú.

== Career ==
Morán played in Mexican football in 2011 with Mérida. He made eight substitute appearances in the 2010–11 Liga de Ascenso season, including for his senior debut on 15 January 2011 versus Irapuato. After spending 2013–14 in Torneo Argentino B with 25 de Mayo, where he scored once in eleven fixtures, Morán joined Deportivo Roca of Torneo Federal A. He scored four goals in his first seven appearances, netting in matches against CAI, Independiente, General Belgrano and Guillermo Brown. He remained for three seasons, featuring in fifty-two games and scoring nine. Morán joined Alvarado on loan for the 2016 play-offs.

After further stints in the regionalised tier three with Gimnasia y Esgrima and Cipolletti, Morán moved across to the other third division after agreeing terms with Primera B Metropolitana side Barracas Central. His first appearance arrived in a 5–1 win over Defensores Unidos, in a campaign which ended with promotion as champions to the 2019–20 Primera B Nacional. After leaving Barracas soon after, in June 2019, he subsequently joined La Amistad of Liga Confluencia. Morán left in January 2020, after agreeing terms with Primera C Metropolitana team Real Pilar. He scored his first goal in a win over Deportivo Español.

== Career statistics ==
As of 10 September 2020.

Appearances and goals by club, season and competition
Club	Season	League			Cup		League Cup		Continental		Other		Total	
Club	Season	Division	Apps	Goals	Apps	Goals	Apps	Goals	Apps	Goals	Apps	Goals	Apps	Goals
Mérida	2010–11	Liga de Ascenso	8	0	0	0	—		—		0	0	8	0
25 de Mayo	2013–14	Torneo Argentino B	11	1	0	0	—		—		0	0	11	1
Deportivo Roca	2014	Torneo Federal A	9	4	0	0	—		—		2 (Note: Appearance(s) in the Torneo Federal A play-offs)	0	11	4
Deportivo Roca	2015	Torneo Federal A	29	3	0	0	—		—		1	0	30	3
Deportivo Roca	2016	Torneo Federal A	11	2	0	0	—		—		0	0	11	2
Deportivo Roca	Total		49	9	0	0	—		—		3	0	52	9
Alvarado (loan)	2016	Torneo Federal A	0	0	0	0	—		—		4	1	4	1
Gimnasia y Esgrima	2016–17	Torneo Federal A	7	0	1	0	—		—		2	0	10	0
Cipolletti	2017–18	Torneo Federal A	18	4	4	1	—		—		0	0	22	5
Barracas Central	2018–19	Primera B Metropolitana	15	1	0	0	—		—		0	0	15	1
Real Pilar	2019–20	Primera C Metropolitana	8	1	0	0	—		—		0	0	8	1
Career total			116	17	5	1	—		—		9	0	130	18

== Honours ==
Barracas Central

- Primera B Metropolitana: 2018–19

La Amistad

- Liga Confluencia: 2019 Clausura
