= Mafre Icuté =

Guatemalan footballer

Personal information
- Full name: Manfred Noé Icuté Fuentes
- Date of birth: 20 April 1988 (age 38)
- Place of birth: San Miguel Petapa, Guatemala
- Height: 1.68 m (5 ft 6 in)
- Position: Midfielder

Team information
- Current team: Suchitepéquez

Youth career
- –2010: Petapa

Senior career*
Years	Team	Apps	(Gls)
2010–2015	Petapa	134	(13)
2016	Cobán Imperial	19	(3)
2016	Municipal	11	(0)
2017–2018	Petapa	65	(1)
2018	Xelajú	10	(0)
2019–2025	Santa Lucía	84	(3)
2025–	Suchitepéquez	0	(0)

International career
2016	Guatemala	3	(0)
- * Club domestic league appearances and goals as of 6:09, 18 June 2018 (UTC)

Manfred Noé Icuté Fuentes (born April 20, 1988) is a Guatemalan professional footballer who plays as a midfielder for Primera División de Ascenso club Suchitepéquez.

== Club career ==
=== Petapa ===
Born in San Miguel Petapa, Icuté naturally came up through the youth ranks of local club Deportivo Petapa. He made his debut during the 2010–11 season, while the team was in the second division (Primera División de Ascenso). They were promoted for the next season, and he made his first division debut on July 10, 2011 in a 2-1 loss to Comunicaciones.

=== Cobán Imperial ===
Icuté signed with fellow Liga Nacional team Cobán Imperial during the preseason in December 2015. He also considered Guatemalan giants Municipal and Comunicaciones. He scored 3 goals in 19 appearances with Los Príncipes Azules during the 2015–16 Clausura season, and became captain by the end of the competition.

=== Municipal ===
In May 2016, 29-time champions Municipal made headlines when they signed both Icuté and Mexican forward Carlos Kamiani to one-year contracts just 24 hours after being eliminated from the 2015–16 Clausura playoffs.

== International career ==
Icuté was first called up to train with the Guatemala national team squad in March 2015, while captaining Deportivo Petapa. However, he did not earn an official cap until appearing in a 3-1 victory over Honduras in a friendly on February 10, 2016, where he recorded one assist. He also appeared in a 1-0 win over El Salvador a month later as a member of the starting XI.

A week later, he was named by manager Walter Claverí as part of the 24-man squad that was to represent Guatemala at the 2018 FIFA World Cup Qualifiers (CONCACAF). He featured in a 4-0 loss to the United States on March 29 in Columbus, Ohio.

== Honours ==
Deportivo Petapa

- Primera División de Ascenso: 2013–14 Clausura, 2013–14 Apertura
