= José Carlos Martínez (footballer) =

Guatemalan footballer (born 1997)

Personal information
- Full name: José Carlos Martínez Navas
- Date of birth: 10 October 1997 (age 29)
- Place of birth: Moyuta, Guatemala
- Height: 1.80 m (5 ft 11 in)
- Position: Forward

Team information
- Current team: Municipal
- Number: 9

Senior career*
Years	Team	Apps	(Gls)
2016–	Municipal	130	(44)

International career^{‡}
2019	Guatemala U22	4	(0)
2018–	Guatemala	28	(4)
- * Club domestic league appearances and goals ‡ National team caps and goals as of 19 April 2026

José Carlos Martínez Navas (born 10 October 1997) is a Guatemalan professional footballer who plays as a forward for Liga Guate club Municipal and the Guatemala national team.

== International career ==
He made his debut internationally on 15 August 2018, in a 3–0 friendly victory against Cuba.

In 2019, he was called up to the Guatemala U22 team for the World Youth Festival Toulon.

On 5 September 2019, Martínez scored his first goal for the senior team against Anguilla in a 10–0 victory in the CONCACAF Nations League.

== Career statistics ==
=== International goals ===
Scores and results list Guatemala's goal tally first.

No.	Date	Venue	Opponent	Score	Result	Competition
1.	5 September 2019	Estadio Doroteo Guamuch Flores, Guatemala City, Guatemala	Anguilla	2–0	10–0	2019–20 CONCACAF Nations League C
2.	3 July 2021	DRV PNK Stadium, Fort Lauderdale, United States	Guyana	4–0	4–0	2021 CONCACAF Gold Cup qualification
3.	8 June 2024	Estadio Doroteo Guamuch Flores, Guatemala City, Guatemala	Dominica	5–0	6–0	2026 FIFA World Cup qualification
4.	5 September 2024	Estadio Doroteo Guamuch Flores, Guatemala City, Guatemala	Martinique	3–1	3–1	2024–25 CONCACAF Nations League A

== Honours ==
Municipal

- Liga Nacional de Guatemala: Clausura 2017, Apertura 2019, Clausura 2024

Individual

- Trofeo Juan Carlos Plata: 2023 Apertura
