= CD Achuapa =

Association football club in Guatemala

Achuapa
- Full name: Club Deportivo Achuapa
- Nickname: Los Cebolleros (The Chives)
- Founded: 1932; 94 years ago
- Ground: Estadio Winston Pineda
- Capacity: 7,300
- Chairman: Francisco Zepeda
- Manager: Rónald Gómez
- League: Liga Guate
- Apertura 2024: 9th

Club Deportivo Achuapa is a Guatemalan professional football club based in El Progreso. They compete in the Liga Guate, the top tier of Guatemalan football.

They now play their home games in the Estadio El Cóndor after moving there from the Estadio Municipal Manuel Ariza.

== History ==
The club was founded in 1932 as Oriental Progresista. In 1974 they joined the Guatemalan League B.

They have spent the 2000/2001 season at the highest level of Guatemalan football, playing in the Liga Nacional de Guatemala. They have been playing in the Primera División Group "A" or "B" until getting promoted back to the Liga Nacional in 2020.

== Honours ==
=== Domestic competitions ===
==== League ====
- Primera División de Ascenso

Winners (1): Apertura 2019

- Segunda División de Ascenso

Winners (1): Clausura 2018

=== Friendly Tournaments ===
- Copa La Fraternidad

Winners (1): 2023

== Players ==
=== Current squad ===
Note: Flags indicate national team as defined under FIFA eligibility rules; some limited exceptions apply. Players may hold more than one non-FIFA nationality.

No.	Pos.	Nation	Player
2	DF	HON	Dayron Suazo
4	DF	GUA	Mathius Gaitán (on loan from Municipal)
6	DF	GUA	Randall Corado (on loan from Municipal)
7	FW	GUA	Carlos Mejía
9	FW	TRI	Jomal Williams
10	MF	GUA	Edgar Macal
11	MF	GUA	Edwin Bol
12	GK	COL	Ederson Cabezas
16	DF	GUA	Carlos Castrillo (captain)
17	FW	PAR	Derlis Aquino
19	DF	GUA	Sixto Betancourt
20	FW	GUA	Erick Sánchez

No.	Pos.	Nation	Player
21	MF	GUA	Isaías de León
22	DF	GUA	Cristian González
25	MF	GUA	Kevin Castillo
26	DF	GUA	Kevin Tiul
27	GK	GUA	Luis Fernando Ruiz
28	GK	GUA	Billy Pérez
29	FW	GUA	Jair Asprilla (on loan from Municipal)
30	DF	GUA	José Corado
59	MF	GUA	Larrson Rosales (on loan from Antigua)
66	MF	GUA	Carlos Santos
88	MF	COL	Yeison Carabalí
91	FW	GUA	Alexis Matta

=== In ===
Note: Flags indicate national team as defined under FIFA eligibility rules; some limited exceptions apply. Players may hold more than one non-FIFA nationality.

No.	Pos.	Nation	Player
—		GUA	TBD (From TBD)
—		GUA	TBD (From TBD)
—		GUA	TBD (From TBD)
—		GUA	TBD (From TBD)
—		GUA	TBD (From TBD)

No.	Pos.	Nation	Player
—		GUA	TBD (From TBD)
—		GUA	TBD (From TBD)
—		GUA	TBD (From TBD)

=== Out ===
Note: Flags indicate national team as defined under FIFA eligibility rules; some limited exceptions apply. Players may hold more than one non-FIFA nationality.

No.	Pos.	Nation	Player
—		COL	Jesus Zuñiga (To Isidro Metapan)
—		GUA	TBD (To TBD)
—		GUA	TBD (To TBD)
—		GUA	TBD (To TBD)

No.	Pos.	Nation	Player
—		GUA	TBD (To TBD)
—		GUA	TBD (To TBD)
—		GUA	TBD (To TBD)
—		GUA	TBD (To TBD)

== Personnel ==
=== Coaching staff ===
As of July 2025

Position	Staff
Coach	(Uruguay) Martín Adrián García (*)
Assistant manager	(Uruguay) Augusto Camejo (*)
Reserve manager	(Guatemala) TBD (*)
Goalkeeper Coach	(Guatemala) Carlos Morales (*)
Under 17 Manager	(Guatemala) TBD (*)
Under 15 Manager	(Guatemala) TBD (*)
Sporting director	(Guatemala) TBD (*)
Fitness Coach	(Guatemala) Rubén Oliva (*)
Team Doctor	(Guatemala) TBD (*)
Fitness Coach	(Guatemala) TBD (*)
Physiotherapy	(Guatemala) TBD (*)
Utility	(Guatemala) TBD (*)

== Notable former players ==
- (Uruguay) Álvaro Garcia (GK)
- (Brazil) Juliano Rangel (DF)
- (Brazil) Rafael da Roza (MF)
- (Colombia) Marlon Negrete (FW)
- (Colombia) Eliser Quiñones (FW)
- (Colombia) Orlando Osorio (DF)
- (Paraguay) Orlando Moreira (DF)
- (Argentina) Alexis Libonatti (MF)
- (Argentina) Nicolas Martínez (FW)
- (Panama) Roberto Nurse (FW)
- (Guatemala) Jorge Estrada (MF)
- (Guatemala) Edgar Macal (MF)
- (Guatemala) Brandon Dávila (GK)
- (Guatemala) Hamilton López (DF)
- (Guatemala) Jorge Matul (DF)
- (Guatemala) Oliver Rodas (FW)
- (Guatemala) Erick Lemus (FW)

== Managerial history ==
- (Guatemala) Ricardo Carreño (2000–2001)
- (Guatemala) Irving Olivares (2019–2020)
- (Guatemala) Iván León (2020–2021)
- (Chile) Sergio Pardo (2021)
- (Guatemala) Rafael Díaz (2021)
- (Uruguay) Gustavo Machaín (2021)
- (Mexico) Raúl Arias (2021–2022)
- (Mexico) Adrián Arias (2022)
- (Honduras) Ramón Maradiaga (2022–2023)
- (Mexico) Raúl Arias (2023)
- (Mexico) Adrián Arias (2023)
- (Colombia) Milton García (2024)
- (Costa Rica) Rónald Gómez (2024- February 2025)
- (Mexico) Adrián Arias (February 2025 - May 2025)
- (Uruguay) Martín Adrián García Curbelo (June 2025-Present)
