= Milton García =

Colombian football manager (born 1986)

Personal information
- Full name: Milton García Gutiérrez
- Date of birth: 13 August 1986 (age 40)
- Place of birth: Magangué, Colombia

Managerial career
- Years: Team
- Expreso Rojo (youth)
- Real Cartagena (youth)
- 2016–2019: Real Cartagena (assistant)
- 2018: Real Cartagena (interim)
- 2019: Real Cartagena
- 2021: Unión Comercio (assistant)
- 2022: Iztapa (assistant)
- 2022–2023: Iztapa
- 2023: Quiché
- 2024: Achuapa
- 2024: Unión Comercio

Milton García Gutiérrez (born 13 August 1986) is a Colombian football manager and former player.

== Career ==
Born in Magangué, Bolívar Department, García played for Categoría Primera C teams before moving to coaching. He moved to Cartagena, where he managed the youth sides of Expreso Rojo and Real Cartagena.

In May 2018, after working as an assistant manager of the main squad, García was named interim manager in the place of Marco Indaburo. He later returned to his previous role after the appointment of Richard Parra, before being named sporting director of the youth setup on 16 September 2019.

On 27 September 2019, García was appointed manager of Real Cartagena until the end of the year, replacing José Santa. After missing out promotion, he resigned on 9 January 2020.

On 18 March 2021, García reunited with Parra after becoming his assistant at Peruvian side Unión Comercio. He followed Parra to Iztapa in Guatemala in July 2022, before being named manager of the club on 22 August.

García left Iztapa on a mutual agreement on 20 February 2023, and later worked at Quiché before taking over Achuapa on 18 December.

Dismissed by Achuapa after just eight matches, García returned to Unión Comercio on 29 March 2024, now being appointed manager. He was sacked on 18 May, however.
