= Coatepeque FC =

Association football club in Guatemala

Coatepeque
- Full name: Coatepeque Fútbol Club
- Nicknames: Serpientes Rojas (Red Serpents); Los Diablos (The Devils)
- Founded: 15 May 1967; 56 years ago
- Ground: Estadio Israel Barrios
- Capacity: 20,000
- President: Oscar Alexander Perez
- Manager: Silvio Fernández
- League: Liga Primera División
- Clausura 2024: 12th (Relegated)
Home colours	Away colours	Third colours

Coatepeque Fútbol Club, is a Guatemalan professional football club based in Coatepeque, Quetzaltenango Department. They compete in the Liga Primera División, the second tier of Guatemalan football.

They play their home games at Estadio Israel Barrios.

== History ==
Coatepeque plays in the Primera División, returning after being relegated from the Liga Nacional during the 2023-24 season.

Coatepeque was founded in 1967, under the name of Deportivo Independencia which was later changed to Deportivo Coatepeque.

The team won promotion to the premier Liga Nacional for the first time in their history during the 2013–14 season.

Their rivals are Xelajú, known as Derbi de Quetzaltenango given both teams from the same department.

== Current squad ==
Note: Flags indicate national team as defined under FIFA eligibility rules; some limited exceptions apply. Players may hold more than one non-FIFA nationality.

No.	Pos.	Nation	Player
1	GK	GUA	Luis Tatuaca
4	DF	GUA	Luis Estrada
5	DF	URU	Federico Antúnez
6	MF	GUA	Osman Valeriano
7	MF	GUA	Christian Solares
8	DF	GUA	Carlos Alvarado
10	MF	MEX	Armando Zamorano
12	GK	GUA	Vander Cruz
14	DF	GUA	Wilson Díaz (captain)
15	FW	PAR	Edison Ávalos
16	DF	ESA	Edgardo Mira
17	MF	GUA	Denilson Ochaeta
19	DF	GUA	Sixto Betancourt
20	MF	GUA	Ditter Lang
21	FW	CRC	José Alvarado

No.	Pos.	Nation	Player
22	MF	GUA	José Guerra
25	MF	GUA	Christian Guerra
30	MF	MEX	Abel Guzman
31	DF	GUA	Pablo Rosas
33	MF	GUA	Tobit Vasquez
44	DF	GUA	Melfor Ramos
77	MF	GUA	José Palma
98	FW	GUA	Diego Tatuaca (on loan from USAC)
-	GK	MEX	Liborio Sánchez
-	FW	GUA	Fredy López
-	MF	GUA	Ramiro Luna
-	FW	GUA	Herminio Pérez

== Historical list of coaches ==
- (Argentina) Carlos Barone (2006-2008) Subcampeon Nacional
- (Brazil) Paulo César Barros (2009–2010)
- (Guatemala) Antonio Archila (2010–2011)
- (Argentina) Ramon Ramírez (2011–2012)
- (Guatemala) Byron Pérez (2012)
- (Guatemala) Gabriel Castillo (2012–2013)
- (United States) Jeff Korytoski (2013–2014)
- (Uruguay) Richard Preza (2014)
- (Guatemala) Ulises Sosa (2014)
- (Guatemala) Rudy Méndez (2014)
- (Guatemala) Manuel Castañeda (2014-2015)
- (Argentina) Héctor Trujillo (2015–2016)
- (Costa Rica) Ronald Mora (2020)
- (Guatemala) Gabriel Castillo (2021)
- (Argentina) Héctor Trujillo (2021-2022)
- (Guatemala) Joaquín Álvarez (2022-2023)
- (Mexico) Paco Ramírez (2023)
- (Uruguay) Silvio Fernández (2024-present)

== Honours ==
=== Domestic Competitions ===
==== League ====
- Primera División de Ascenso

Winners: Apertura 2022
