= CD Iztapa =

Association football club in Guatemala

Iztapa
- Full name: Club Deportivo Iztapa
- Nickname: Los Peces Velas (The Sailfishes)
- Founded: 1960; 65 years ago
- Ground: Estadio Municipal El Morón
- Capacity: 3,500
- Chairman: Mario Mejía
- Manager: Pablo Garabello
- League: Liga Primera División
- Clausura 2024: Group A 3rd (Quarterfinals)
- Website: https://www.facebook.com/clubdeportivoiztapa
Home colours	Away colours

Club Deportivo Iztapa, commonly referred to as Iztapa, is a Guatemalan professional association football club based in Iztapa. The club competes in the Liga Primera División, the second tier of Guatemalan football.

Iztapa have played their home matches at the 3,500-capacity El Morón.

== Honours ==
=== Domestic Competitions ===
==== League ====
- Liga Primera División

Winners (3): Clausura 2017, Apertura 2018, Clausura 2018

== Players ==
=== Current squad ===
As of January 30, 2023

Note: Flags indicate national team as defined under FIFA eligibility rules; some limited exceptions apply. Players may hold more than one non-FIFA nationality.

No.	Pos.	Nation	Player
1	GK	URU	Javier Irazún
2	DF	COL	Anier Figueroa
5	DF	GUA	José Salazar
7	FW	COL	Jhony Cano
8	MF	GUA	Benedicto Aldana
9	MF	GUA	Cristian Albizures
10	FW	GUA	Jerry Ojeda
11	MF	GUA	Néstor Grajeda
12	DF	GUA	Eliseo Díaz
14	DF	SLV	Edgardo Mira
16	MF	GUA	Cristian Guerra
17	MF	GUA	Pedro Samayoa (captain)

No.	Pos.	Nation	Player
20	FW	GUA	Jonathan Diéguez
21	GK	GUA	José García
24	MF	GUA	Elder Gómez
25	MF	CRC	Manfred Russell
26	MF	GUA	Otto Tatuaca
27	MF	GUA	Vidal Paz (on loan from Antigua)
28	MF	GUA	King León
30	MF	GUA	Elvis Zamora
31	GK	GUA	Carlos Ávila
32	DF	GUA	Dennis Soto
72	DF	GUA	Sergio Azurdia
97	DF	GUA	José Castillejos
99	DF	GUA	Fredy López

== Managerial history ==
- (Guatemala) Eduardo Acevedo (2009-2010)
- (Argentina) Gustavo Reinoso (2013-2014)
- (Costa Rica) Jose Luis Torres (2014)
- (Guatemala) Francisco Melgar (2016-2019)
- (Guatemala) Juan Alberto Salguero (2019)
- (Argentina) Ramiro Cepeda (2019-2022)
- (Colombia) Richard Parra (2022)
- (Colombia) Milton García (2022-2023)
- (Argentina) Pablo Garabello (2023- )
