= CSD Xinabajul =

Association football club in Guatemala

Xinabajul
- Full name: Club Social y Deportivo Xinabajul Huehue
- Nickname: El Equipo X (The X Team)
- Founded: 1980; 43 years ago
- Dissolved: 8 August 2025; 8 months ago
- Ground: Estadio Los Cuchumatanes
- Capacity: 5,340
- Apertura 2024: 5th (Semifinals)
- Website: www.aficionx.com
Home colours	Away colours

Club Social y Deportivo Xinabajul Huehue was a Guatemalan professional football club based in Huehuetenango. They competed in the Liga Nacional, the top tier of Guatemalan football.

Founded in 1980, they competed in the Liga Nacional, the top division in the nation, and played home matches at the Estadio Los Cuchumatanes.

== History ==
In the summer of 2012, the club was disaffiliated and disbanded after not paying player salaries and going into heavy debt. Bad ownership and mismanagement led to the downfall of the club. A new club from the same city claiming to have no relation to Deportivo Xinabajul, was founded weeks later, they began play in division 3. Ever since then, the team has been playing in the Primera División, the second tier of Guatemalan football.

The club returned to the Liga Nacional in June 2022 after winning their promotional playoff game against Marquense.

== Notable former players ==
- (Guatemala) Álvaro Hurtarte (MF)
- (Guatemala) Henry Medina (DF)
- (Guatemala) Sergio Azurdia (DF)
- (Guatemala) Hetzon Pereira (MF)
- (Guatemala) Usiel Rivas (DF)
- (Guatemala) Andrés Quiñonez (DF)
- (Guatemala) Kristian Guzmán (DF)
- (Brazil) Ademar (MF)
- (Brazil) Valtencir (MF)
- (Uruguay) Matías González (DF)
- (Uruguay) Paolo Dantaz (MF)
- (Colombia) Raul Peñaranda (FW)
- (Mexico) Martín Zúñiga (FW)
- (Mexico) Liborio Sánchez (GK)
- (Panama) Manuel Gamboa (DF)
- (Honduras) Darwin Pacheco (DF)
- (Costa Rica) Fernando Patterson (GK)
