= 2021–22 Liga Nacional de Guatemala =

69th professional season of the top-flight football league in Guatemala

Liga Nacional de Guatemala
- Season: 2021–22
- Dates: 30 July 2021 – 29 May 2022
- Champions: Apertura: Malacateco (1st title); Clausura: Comunicaciones (31st title)
- Relegated: Nueva Concepción; Sololá
- CONCACAF League: Malacateco; Comunicaciones; Municipal
- Top goalscorer: Apertura: Matías Rotondi (15 goals); Clausura: Isaac Acuña (12 goals)
- Biggest home win: Apertura: Malacateco 7–1 Iztapa; Clausura: Santa Lucía 8–1 Nueva Concepción
- Biggest away win: Apertura: Sololá 0–4 Comunicaciones; Clausura: Nueva Concepción 1–5 Iztapa
- Longest unbeaten run: Apertura: (10 Games) Santa Lucía; Clausura: (8 Games) Guastatoya
- Longest winless run: Apertura: (7 Games) Achuapa; Clausura: (9 Games) Sololá
- Highest attendance: Apertura: 9,000; Malacateco 2–0 Comunicaciones (31 December 2021); Clausura: 18,000; Comunicaciones 1–0 Municipal (29 May 2022)
- Lowest attendance: Clausura:
- Average attendance: Apertura: 1,875; Clausura: 15,000
- Stats are from the regular season only

The 2021–22 Liga Nacional de Guatemala was the 69th professional season of the top-flight football league in Guatemala. The season was divided into two championships—the 2021 Apertura and the 2022 Clausura—each in an identical format and each contested by the same 12 teams.

== Teams ==
=== Promotion and relegation (pre-season) ===
A total of 12 teams will contest the league, including 10 sides from the 2020–21 Guatemala Liga Nacional and 2 promoted from the 2020–21 Primera División.

Teams relegated to Primera División de Ascenso

Sacachispas and Sanarate were relegated to 2020–21 Primera División the previous season.

Teams promoted from Primera División de Ascenso

The relegated teams were replaced by the 2020–21 Primera División winners Nueva Concepción and Sololá.

=== Personnel and sponsoring ===
Team	Chairman	Head Coach	Captain	Kitmaker	Shirt Sponsors
Achuapa	(Guatemala) Francisco Zepeda	(Mexico) Adrián García Arias (interim)	(Guatemala) Juan Cardona	NS Sport	Claro, Banrural, Domino's, Tellioz, Gallo
Antigua	(Guatemala) Víctor Hugo García	(Guatemala) Dwight Pezzarossi (interim)	(Guatemala) Cristian Jiménez	Joma	Tigo, Banrural, Betcris, Domino's, Glucosoral, Mercedes-Benz, Bridgestone
Cobán Imperial	(Guatemala) Irasema Meléndez	(Argentina) Sebastián Bini	(Brazil) Janderson	NetSportswear	Tigo, Pepsi, Bantrab, Gatorade, Domino's, Mayafert
Comunicaciones	(Guatemala) Juan Garcia	(Uruguay) Willy Coito Olivera	(Guatemala) José Contreras	Nino	Tigo, Banrural, Gatorade, Pepsi, Zeta Gas
Guastatoya	(Guatemala) Léster Rodríguez	(Nicaragua) Mario Acevedo	(Guatemala) Wilson Pineda	NetSportswear	Claro, Banrural, Sistecom, Cementos Progreso, Canal 3
Iztapa	(Guatemala) Mario Mejía	(Colombia) Richard Parra	(Mexico) Carlos Kamiani Félix	TutoSport	Tigo, Banrural, Starbus
Malacateco	(Guatemala) Carlos Gutiérrez	(Mexico) Roberto Hernández	(Guatemala) Sixto Betancourt	Silver Sport	Claro, Betcris, Coca-Cola, Starbus, Z Gas
Municipal	(Guatemala) Gerardo Villa	(Paraguay) José Cardozo	(Guatemala) Ricardo Jérez	Umbro	Claro, Banrural, Bremen, Pepsi, Herbalife
Nueva Concepción	(Guatemala) Ezequiel Orellana	(Guatemala) Adrián Barrios	(Colombia) Jonathan Muñoz	Jama	Claro, Corporación Smith, Bazar Popular
Sololá	(Guatemala) Jahiro Otzoy	(Argentina) Silvio Rudman	(Costa Rica) Víctor Bolivar	NovaSport	Tigo, Shell, Colua
Santa Lucía	(Guatemala) Rodolfo Puertas	(Argentina) Matías Tatangelo	(Brazil) Thales Moreira	NetSportswear	Claro, Banrural, Domino’s, Sistecom, Azúcar de Guatemala
Xelajú	(Guatemala) Francisco Santos	(Mexico) Irving Rubirosa	(Guatemala) Héctor Moreira	MR	Tigo, Banrural, Domino's, Pepsi, Shell, Gatorade, Zeta Gas

=== Managerial changes ===
==== Beginning of the season ====
Team	Outgoing manager	Manner of departure	Date of vacancy	Replaced by	Date of appointment	Position in table
Achuapa	(Chile) Sergio Pardo	Resigned	May 2021	(Uruguay) Gustavo Machaín	May 2021	th (Apertura 2021)
Comunicaciones	(Argentina) Mauricio Tapia	Resigned	June 2021	(Uruguay) Willy Coito Olivera	June 2021	th (Apertura 2021)
Municipal	(Argentina) Sebastián Bini	Sacked	May 2021	(Paraguay) José Cardozo	May 2021	th (Apertura 2021)
Malacateco	(Costa Rica) Rónald Gómez	Resigned	May 2021	(Argentina) Matías Tatangelo	May 2021	th (Apertura 2021)

==== During the Apertura season ====
Team	Outgoing manager	Manner of departure	Date of vacancy	Replaced by	Date of appointment	Position in table
Achuapa	(Uruguay) Gustavo Machaín	Sacked	August 21	(Mexico) Raúl Arias	August 22	10th (Apertura 2021)
Malacateco	(Argentina) Matías Tatangelo	Sacked	August 22	(Mexico) Roberto Hernández	August 26	12th (Apertura 2021)
Guastatoya	(Guatemala) Rafael Díaz	Sacked	August 29	(Mexico) Daniel Guzmán	August 29	9th (Apertura 2021)
Cobán Imperial	(Guatemala) Fabricio Benítez	Sacked	September 22	(Argentina) Sebastián Bini	September 22	12th (Apertura 2021)
Xelajú	(Guatemala) Marcó Antonio Morales	Mutual agreement termination	October 18	(Mexico) Irving Rubirosa	October 20	6th (Apertura 2021)
Nueva Concepción	(Guatemala) Manuel Castañeda	Resigned	October 25	(Paraguay) Gustavo Bobadilla	October 28	12th (Apertura 2021)
Sololá	(Guatemala) Marvin Hernández	Sacked	November 2	(Guatemala) Rafael Díaz	November 2	9th (Apertura 2021)
Guastatoya	(Mexico) Daniel Guzmán	Resigned	December 1	(Guatemala) Josué Omar Morales (interim)	December 2	9th (Apertura 2021)

==== Pre-Clausura changes ====
Team	Outgoing manager	Manner of departure	Date of vacancy	Replaced by	Date of appointment	Position in table
Nueva Concepción	(Paraguay) Gustavo Bobadilla	Mutual agreement termination	December 8	(Guatemala) Irving Olivares	December 8	12th
Santa Lucía	(Nicaragua) Mario Acevedo	Resigned	December 24	(Guatemala) Juan Manuel Funes	December 29	Preseason
Guastatoya	(Guatemala) Josué Omar Morales (interim)	End of interim spell	December 27	(Nicaragua) Mario Acevedo	December 27	Preseason

==== During the Clausura season ====
Team	Outgoing manager	Manner of departure	Date of vacancy	Replaced by	Date of appointment	Position in table
Nueva Concepción	(Guatemala) Irving Olivares	Sacked	February 5	(Guatemala) Adrián Barrios	February 8	12th (Clausura 2022)
Santa Lucía	(Guatemala) Juan Manuel Funes	Sacked	February 12	(Argentina) Matías Tatangelo	February 15	8th (Clausura 2022)
Sololá	(Guatemala) Rafael Díaz	Mutual agreement termination	February 15	(Argentina) Silvio Rudman	February 17	12th (Clausura 2022)
Achuapa	(Mexico) Raúl Arias	Mutual agreement termination	February 20	(Mexico) Adrian Arias (interim)	February 23	11th (Clausura 2022)
Antigua	(Mexico) Roberto Montoya	Sacked	March 3	(Guatemala) Dwight Pezzarossi (interim)	March 4	5th (Clausura 2022)
Iztapa	(Argentina) Ramiro Cepeda	Resigned	March 20	(Colombia) Richard Parra	March 21	10th (Clausura 2022)
Xelajú	(Mexico) Irving Rubirosa	Mutual agreement termination	May 13	(Guatemala) Amarini Villatoro	May 24	10th (Clausura 2022)

== Apertura ==
=== League table ===
Pos	Team	Pld	W	D	L	GF	GA	GD	Pts	Qualification
1	Antigua	22	14	4	4	36	13	+23	46	Qualification for the Championship Playoffs
2	Comunicaciones	22	13	5	4	37	19	+18	44	Qualification for the Championship Playoffs
3	Municipal	22	11	6	5	30	15	+15	39	Qualification for the Championship Playoffs
4	Malacateco	22	10	6	6	36	23	+13	36	Qualification for the Championship Playoffs
5	Santa Lucía	22	8	12	2	28	25	+3	36	Qualification for the Championship Playoffs
6	Xelajú	22	8	6	8	18	32	−14	30	Qualification for the Championship Playoffs
7	Iztapa	22	8	4	10	21	32	−11	28	Qualification for the Championship Playoffs
8	Sololá	22	6	7	9	21	32	−11	25	Qualification for the Championship Playoffs
9	Guastatoya	22	5	8	9	18	23	−5	23	
10	Cobán Imperial	22	5	5	12	22	31	−9	20	
11	Achuapa	22	3	7	12	12	24	−12	16	
12	Nueva Concepción	22	4	4	14	12	36	−24	16	

Rules for classification: 1) Points; 2) Head-to-head record; 3) Goal difference; 4) Goals scored; 5) Matches won; 6) Away matches won; 7) Away goals scored.

=== Championship Playoffs ===
- Qualified teams
  - Antigua
  - Comunicaciones
  - Municipal
  - Malacateco
  - Santa Lucía
  - Xelajú
  - Iztapa
  - Sololá

==== Final ====
===== First leg =====
31 December 2021
16:00 (UTC-6)

Malacateco	2-0	Comunicaciones
Eduardo Rotondi 39'; Wilson Godoy 71'	[]	Nil

Estadio Municipal Santa Lucía, Malacatán
Attendance: 9,000
Referee: Mario Escobar

===== Second leg =====
2 January 2022
13:00 (UTC-6)

Comunicaciones	0-0	Malacateco
Nil		Nil

Estadio Doroteo Guamuch Flores, Guatemala City
Attendance: 4,900
Referee: Julio Cesar Luna

Apertura 2021 champions

1st title

== Clausura ==
=== League table ===
Pos	Team	Pld	W	D	L	GF	GA	GD	Pts	Qualification
1	Comunicaciones	22	12	5	5	39	24	+15	41	Qualification for the Championship Playoffs
2	Municipal	22	12	4	6	34	18	+16	40	Qualification for the Championship Playoffs
3	Guastatoya	22	10	7	5	32	18	+14	37	Qualification for the Championship Playoffs
4	Malacateco	22	9	8	5	29	22	+7	35	Qualification for the Championship Playoffs
5	Cobán Imperial	22	9	7	6	29	25	+4	34	Qualification for the Championship Playoffs
6	Antigua	22	9	6	7	33	22	+11	33	Qualification for the Championship Playoffs
7	Achuapa	22	9	6	7	29	25	+4	33	Qualification for the Championship Playoffs
8	Santa Lucía	22	8	4	10	36	27	+9	28	Qualification for the Championship Playoffs
9	Iztapa	22	7	7	8	30	31	−1	28	
10	Xelajú	22	6	5	11	17	31	−14	23	
11	Sololá	22	3	6	13	19	46	−27	15	
12	Nueva Concepción	22	4	3	15	21	57	−36	15	

Rules for classification: 1) Points; 2) Head-to-head record; 3) Goal difference; 4) Goals scored; 5) Matches won; 6) Away matches won; 7) Away goals scored.

=== Championship Playoffs ===
- Qualified teams
  - Comunicaciones
  - Municipal
  - Antigua
  - Malacateco
  - Cobán Imperial
  - Guastatoya
  - Achuapa
  - Santa Lucía

==== Final ====
===== First leg =====
26 May 2022
16:00 (UTC-6)

Municipal	0–1	Comunicaciones

Estadio El Trébol, Guatemala City
Attendance: 8,000

===== Second leg =====
29 May 2022
13:00 (UTC-6)

Comunicaciones	1–0	Municipal

Estadio Doroteo Guamuch Flores, Guatemala City
Attendance: 18,000

Clausura 2022 champions

31st title

== Aggregate table ==
Pos	Team	Pld	W	D	L	GF	GA	GD	Pts	Qualification or relegation
1	Comunicaciones	44	25	10	9	76	43	+33	85	CONCACAF League round of 16 (Note: As Clausura champions (GUA1))
2	Antigua	44	23	10	11	69	37	+32	79	
3	Municipal	44	23	10	11	64	33	+31	79	CONCACAF League preliminary round (Note: As runners-up with better aggregate record (GUA3))
4	Malacateco	44	19	14	11	65	45	+20	71	CONCACAF League preliminary round (Note: As Apertura champions (GUA2))
5	Santa Lucía	44	16	16	12	64	52	+12	64	
6	Guastatoya	44	15	15	14	50	41	+9	60	
7	Iztapa	44	15	11	18	51	63	−12	56	
8	Cobán Imperial	44	14	12	18	51	56	−5	54	
9	Xelajú	44	14	11	19	29	63	−34	53	
10	Deportivo Achuapa	44	12	13	19	41	49	−8	49	
11	Sololá	44	9	13	22	40	78	−38	40	Relegated to Primera División de Ascenso
12	Nueva Concepción	44	8	7	29	33	93	−60	31	Relegated to Primera División de Ascenso

Source: Soccerway
Rules for classification: 1) points; 2) goal difference; 3) number of goals scored.

== List of Foreign Players ==
This is a list of foreign players in 2021-2022 season. The following players:

1. have played at least one apertura game for the respective club.
2. have not been capped for the Guatemala national football team on any level, independently from the birthplace.

A new rule was introduced a few season ago, that clubs can only have five foreign players per club and can only add a new player if there is an injury or player/s is released.

Achuapa

- (Uruguay) Álvaro García
- (Colombia) Orlando Osorio
- (Panama) Roberto Nurse
- (Costa Rica) Jorge Gatgens
- (Argentina) Julián Cardozo

Antigua

- (Mexico) Antonio López
- (Costa Rica) José Mena
- (Costa Rica) Alexander Robinson
- (Honduras) Juan Yax
- (Honduras) Santos Crisanto
- (Peru) Julio García
- (Brazil) Romario da Silva
- (Paraguay) Pedro Báez
- (Colombia) Deyner Padilla

Cobán Imperial

- (Brazil) Janderson
- (Costa Rica) Aaron Navarro
- (Costa Rica) Minor Álvarez
- (Argentina) Angel Díaz
- (Argentina) Esteban Espíndola
- (Argentina) Hernan Gustavo Fener
- (Argentina) Javier Colli
- (Argentina) Nicolas Pietrani

Comunicaciones

- (Cuba) Karel Espino
- (Costa Rica) Andrés Lezcano
- (El Salvador) Alexander Larín
- (Honduras) Kevin López
- (Ecuador) Juan Anangonó
- (Ecuador) José Ayoví
- (Colombia) Jose Corena
- (Panama) Manuel Gamboa

Guastatoya

- (Costa Rica) Adrián de Lemos
- (Mexico) Luis Landín
- (Mexico) Omar Dominguez
- (Argentina) Nicolás Martínez
- (Argentina) Matías Galvaliz

Iztapa

- (Argentina) Nicolás Foglia
- (Argentina) Christian Hernández
- (Argentina) Gianluca Conforti
- (Mexico) Carlos Kamiani Felix
- (Costa Rica) Jordan Smith
- (Costa Rica) Manfred Russell
- (Costa Rica) Anllel Porras

Malacateco

- (Uruguay) Darío Silva
- (Uruguay) Enzo Herrera x
- (Mexico) Elmer Morales
- (Costa Rica) Kenneth Cerdas
- (Brazil) Lucas Ventura
- (Ecuador) Diego Avila

Municipal

- (Paraguay) Milciades Portillo
- (Argentina) Matías Rotondi
- (Uruguay) Steve Makuka
- (El Salvador) Jaime Alas
- (Cuba) Yasnier Matos
- (Mexico) Jesús Isijara

Nueva Concepción

- (Brazil) Aelcio dos Santos
- (Colombia) Jonathan Muñoz
- (Colombia) Jhon Balanta
- (Argentina) Bruno Mariani
- (Argentina) Leandro Martin
- (Mexico) Darío Carreño

Santa Lucía

- (Brazil) Thales Moreira
- (Venezuela) Charles Martínez
- (Mexico) Isaac Acuna
- (Mexico) Omar Morales
- (Colombia) Juan Osorio
- (Argentina) Facundo Aranda

Sololá

- (Costa Rica) Víctor Bolivar
- (Uruguay) Camilo Nassi
- (Uruguay) Facundo Tancredi
- (Peru) Juan Gutiérrez
- (Brazil) Marco Morgon
- (Colombia) Elieser Quinones

Xelajú

- (Uruguay) Rafael García
- (Paraguay) Orlando Moreira
- (Nicaragua) Juan Barrera
- (Argentina) Alejandro Díaz
- (Colombia) Jesús Arrieta
