= 2018–19 Liga Nacional de Guatemala =

66th professional season of the top-flight football league in Guatemala

Liga Nacional de Guatemala
- Season: 2018–19
- Dates: July 2018 – May 2019
- Champions: Apertura: Guastatoya (2nd title); Clausura: Antigua (4th title)
- Relegated: Chiantla; Petapa
- CONCACAF League: Guastatoya; Antigua; Comunicaciones
- Top goalscorer: Agustin Herrera (Antigua GFC) - 9 goals
- Biggest home win: Malacateco 5–0 Chiantla (2018)
- Biggest away win: Chiantla 0–3 Guastatoya (2018)

The 2018–19 Liga Nacional de Guatemala was the 66th professional season of the top-flight football league in Guatemala. The season was divided into two championships—the 2018 Apertura and the 2019 Clausura—each in an identical format and each contested by the same 12 teams.

== Teams ==
Location of the 2018–19 Liga Nacional de Fútbol de Guatemala teams

=== Promotion and relegation (pre-season) ===
A total of 12 teams will contest the league, including 10 sides from the 2017–18 Liga Nacional and 2 promoted from the 2017–18 Primera División.

Teams relegated to Primera División de Ascenso

Deportivo Marquense and C.D. Suchitepéquez were relegated to 2018–19 Primera División the previous season.

Teams promoted from Primera División de Ascenso

The relegated team was replaced by the 2017–18 Primera División winners. Chiantla and Deportivo Iztapa.

=== Personnel and sponsoring ===
Team	Chairman	Head Coach	Captain	Kitmaker	Shirt Sponsors
Antigua GFC	(Guatemala) Víctor Hugo García	(Mexico) Juan Antonio Torres	(Guatemala) TBD	TBD	Tigo, TBD
Chiantla	(Guatemala) Damián Mérida	(Guatemala) Alberto Salguero	(Guatemala) TBD	TBD	Tigo, TBD
Coban Imperial	(Guatemala) Jimmy Morales	(Guatemala) Fabricio Benitez	(Guatemala) TBD	TBD	Tigo, TBD
Comunicaciones	(Mexico) Pedro Portilla	(Uruguay) William Coito Olivera	(Guatemala) TBD	Kappa	Todo en Salud, Gatorade, Zeta Gas
Guastatoya	(Guatemala) Léster Rodríguez	(Guatemala) Amarini Villatoro	(Guatemala) TBD	TBD	Tigo, TBD
Iztapa	(Guatemala) Mario Mejía	(Guatemala) Francisco Melgar	(Guatemala) TBD	TBD	Tigo, TBD
Malacateco	(Guatemala) Carlos Gutiérrez	(Costa Rica) Ronald Gómez	(Guatemala) TBD	TBD	Tigo, TBD
CSD Municipal	(Guatemala) Gerardo Villa	(Argentina) Horacio Cordero	(Guatemala) TBD	TBD	Tigo, TBD
Petapa	(Guatemala) Luis Reyes	(Guatemala) Norman Martin	(Guatemala) TBD	TBD	Tigo, TBD
Sanarate	(Guatemala) Ángel Pantaleón	(Uruguay) Ariel Sena	(Guatemala) TBD	TBD	Tigo, TBD
Siquinalá	(Guatemala) Juan Pablo Godíne	(Guatemala) Otto Rodríguez	(Guatemala)	Kelme	TBD
Xelajú MC	(Guatemala) Francisco Santos	(Guatemala) Walter Horacio González	(Guatemala) TBD	TBD	Tigo, TBD

=== Managerial changes ===
==== Beginning of the season ====
Team	Outgoing manager	Manner of departure	Date of vacancy	Replaced by	Date of appointment	Position in table
Petapa	(Argentina) Ramiro Cepeda	Resigned	May 2018	(Mexico) Rafael Loredo	May 2018	th (Clausura 2018)
Xelaju	(Guatemala) Walter Claveri	Resigned to become coach of the national team	July 2018	(Argentina) Ramiro Cepeda	July 2018	th (Clausura 2018)

==== During the Apertura season ====
Team	Outgoing manager	Manner of departure	Date of vacancy	Replaced by	Date of appointment	Position in table
Chiantla	(Guatemala) Marvin Hernández	Sacked	August 2018	(Guatemala) Alberto Salguero	September 2018	12th (Apertura 2018)
Municipal	(Costa Rica) Hernan Medford	Resigned	September 2018	(Argentina) Horacio Cordero	September 2018	th (Apertura 2018)
Siquinalá	(Argentina) Daniel Berta	TBD	October 2018	(Guatemala) Otto Rodríguez	October 2018	th (Apertura 2018)
Sanarate	(Argentina) Pablo Centrone	TBD	October 2018	(Argentina) Julián Trujillo	October 2018	th (Apertura 2018)

=== Between Apertura and Clausura seasons ===
Team	Outgoing manager	Manner of departure	Date of vacancy	Replaced by	Date of appointment	Position in table
Antigua GFC	(Argentina) Mauricio Tapia	Contract finished	December 2018	(Mexico) Juan Antonio Torres	January 2019	Th (Apertura 2018)

==== During the Clausura season ====
Team	Outgoing manager	Manner of departure	Date of vacancy	Replaced by	Date of appointment	Position in table
Sanarate	(Argentina) Héctor Julian Trujillo	Sacked	February 2019	(Uruguay) Ariel Sena	February 2019	th (Clausura 2019)
Xelaju	(Argentina) Ramiro Cepeda	Sacked	March 2019	(Guatemala) Walter Horacio González	March 2019	8th (Clausura 2019)
Petapa	(Mexico) Rafael Loredo	Sacked	March 2019	(Guatemala) Norman Martin	March 2019	12th (Clausura 2019)

== Apertura ==
=== League table ===
Pos	Team	Pld	W	D	L	GF	GA	GD	Pts	Qualification or relegation
1	Guastatoya	22	13	5	4	34	11	+23	44	Advance to Playoffs (Semifinals)
2	Xelajú	22	11	7	4	28	17	+11	40	Advance to Playoffs (Semifinals)
3	Comunicaciones	22	11	5	6	28	16	+12	38	Advance to Playoffs (Quarterfinals)
4	Malacateco	22	11	5	6	38	32	+6	38	Advance to Playoffs (Quarterfinals)
5	Cobán Imperial	22	10	6	6	28	20	+8	36	Advance to Playoffs (Quarterfinals)
6	Antigua GFC	22	9	7	6	24	24	0	34	Advance to Playoffs (Quarterfinals)
7	Siquinalá	22	7	9	6	31	32	−1	30	
8	Municipal	22	8	4	10	26	30	−4	28	
9	Iztapa	22	6	7	9	23	28	−5	25	
10	Sanarate	22	4	7	11	21	35	−14	19	
11	Petapa	22	3	7	12	18	31	−13	16	
12	Chiantla	22	2	5	15	15	38	−23	11	

Source: Soccerway
Rules for classification: 1) points; 2) goal difference; 3) number of goals scored.

=== Results ===
Home \ Away	ANT	CHI	COB	COM	GUA	IZT	MAL	MUN	PET	SAN	SIQ	XEL
Antigua GFC		2–2	1–2	0–3	3–1	1–0	2–1	1–0	1–2	2–0	0–0	0–0
Chiantla	1–2		0–1	0–2	0–3	1–1	0–1	2–3	2–1	0–0	0–0	1–0
Cobán Imperial	1–0	2–0		0–3	0–1	2–1	3–0	2–0	2–0	0–0	2–1	1–2
Comunicaciones	1–1	2–0	0–2		1–0	1–0	4–0	0–0	1–1	1–0	3–1	1–2
Guastatoya	3–0	2–1	2–2	2–0		3–0	3–1	2–0	1–0	3–0	1–0	0–0
Iztapa	0–2	1–1	2–1	2–0	0–4		0–2	1–0	3–1	4–1	1–1	1–1
Malacateco	3–0	5–0	2–2	1–0	0–0	0–0		5–4	2–1	3–0	3–3	2–1
Municipal	1–1	1–0	1–0	2–0	0–2	1–3	3–4		1–0	1–1	1–2	3–1
Petapa	0–1	1–0	1–1	1–1	1–1	0–0	1–2	0–1		0–2	1–3	1–0
Sanarate	2–3	1–0	1–1	0–1	1–0	3–3	1–1	0–1	2–2		2–0	0–1
Siquinalá	1–1	4–3	1–0	0–2	0–0	1–0	3–0	2–2	2–2	4–3		2–2
Xelajú	0–0	3–1	1–1	1–1	1–0	1–0	1–0	1–0	2–1	4–1	3–0	

Legend: Blue = home team win; Yellow = draw; Red = away team win.

=== Playoffs ===
Quarterfinals
4	Malacateco	2	2	4
5	Cobán Imperial	2	3	5
3	Comunicaciones	1	0	1
6	Antigua GFC	0	0	0

Semifinals
1	Guastatoya	0	0	0
5	Cobán Imperial	0	0	0
2	Xelajú	1	2	3
3	Comunicaciones	4	0	4

Final
1	Guastatoya	2	1	3
3	Comunicaciones	1	1	2

==== Final ====
===== First leg =====
13 December 2018
(UTC-6)

Comunicaciones	1–2	Guastatoya
Maximiliano Lombardi 68'		Luis Martinez 30' 42'

Estadio Nacional Mateo Flores, Guatemala City
Attendance: 8,976
Referee: Walter Lopez

===== Second leg =====
16 December 2018
(UTC-6)

Guastatoya	1–1	Comunicaciones
Angel Rodriguez 13'		Jorge Vargas 65'

Estadio David Cordón Hichos, Guastatoya
Attendance: 2,959
Referee: Mario Escobar

== Clausura ==
=== League table ===
Pos	Team	Pld	W	D	L	GF	GA	GD	Pts	Qualification or relegation
1	Antigua GFC	22	12	5	5	36	20	+16	41	Advance to Playoffs (Semifinals)
2	Cobán Imperial	22	12	4	6	35	25	+10	40	Advance to Playoffs (Semifinals)
3	Comunicaciones	22	11	6	5	32	14	+18	39	Advance to Playoffs (Quarterfinals)
4	Municipal	22	10	6	6	37	22	+15	36	Advance to Playoffs (Quarterfinals)
5	Malacateco	22	10	6	6	24	20	+4	36	Advance to Playoffs (Quarterfinals)
6	Guastatoya	22	9	8	5	27	16	+11	35	Advance to Playoffs (Quarterfinals)
7	Chiantla	22	8	6	8	21	25	−4	30	
8	Xelajú	22	8	5	9	27	25	+2	29	
9	Siquinalá	22	7	5	10	23	25	−2	26	
10	Iztapa	22	7	4	11	21	28	−7	25	
11	Sanarate	22	7	2	13	22	38	−16	23	
12	Petapa	22	2	1	19	12	59	−47	7	

Source: Soccerway
Rules for classification: 1) points; 2) goal difference; 3) number of goals scored.

=== Results ===
Home \ Away	ANT	CHI	COB	COM	GUA	IZT	MAL	MUN	PET	SAN	SIQ	XEL
Antigua GFC		2–2	4–1	1–1	2–0	2–1	1–2	0–1	1–0	4–0	3–0	2–1
Chiantla	1–0		1–1	0–2	0–0	3–0	0–1	1–6	3–0	2–0	0–0	1–1
Cobán Imperial	2–3	3–0		1–0	1–0	2–1	2–0	2–0	4–0	4–1	1–0	2–1
Comunicaciones	0–0	2–0	3–1		0–1	3–1	3–0	1–3	5–0	3–1	0–0	2–0
Guastatoya	1–2	1–0	1–1	0–0		2–0	1–1	1–1	6–0	1–0	1–0	3–0
Iztapa	0–0	0–1	2–0	1–1	0–1		3–1	1–0	2–0	4–1	1–0	0–0
Malacateco	1–1	1–0	1–0	2–1	1–1	0–0		2–0	2–0	1–1	1–0	3–0
Municipal	2–0	0–0	1–1	0–2	2–1	3–0	1–1		6–1	4–1	1–1	0–2
Petapa	0–3	1–2	1–2	0–2	0–0	1–2	1–2	2–3		1–0	0–3	1–0
Sanarate	2–1	1–2	1–2	0–1	3–0	2–1	1–0	0–2	4–1		1–0	1–0
Siquinalá	1–2	0–1	2–2	0–0	0–3	3–1	2–1	1–0	4–2	0–1		2–1
Xelajú	1–2	3–1	2–0	2–0	2–2	2–0	1–0	1–1	3–0	1–1	3–1	

Updated to match(es) played on completed. Source:
Legend: Blue = home team win; Yellow = draw; Red = away team win.

=== Playoffs ===
Quarterfinals
3	Comunicaciones	0	1	1
6	Guastatoya	1	1	2
4	Municipal	0	3	3
5	Malacateco	0	3	3 (a)

Semifinals
1	Antigua GFC	0	2	2
6	Guastatoya	1	0	1
2	Cobán Imperial	2	0	2
5	Malacateco	2	1	3

Final
1	Antigua GFC	1	1	2
5	Malacateco	0	0	0

==== Quarterfinals ====
===== First legs =====
8 May 2019
14:30 (UTC-6)

Guastatoya	1 – 0	Comunicaciones
J. Corena 42'

Estadio David Cordón Hichos
Attendance: 921
Referee: Ever Lopez
9 May 2019
12:00 (UTC-6)

Malacateco	0 – 0	Municipal

Estadio Santa Lucía
Attendance: 1337
Referee: Jonathan Polanco

===== Second legs =====
11 May 2019
20:00 (UTC-6)

Comunicaciones	1 – 1	Guastatoya
C. Estrada 22'		45+2' O. Domínguez

Estadio Doroteo Guamuch Flores

Guastatoya advances 2–1 on aggregate.

12 May 2019
15:00 (UTC-6)

Municipal	3 – 3	Malacateco
F. de León 55'; O. Arce 88'; O. Moreira 90+6'		10' 32' E. Santaliz; 22' E. Herrera

Estadio El Trébol

3–3 on aggregate. Malacateco advances 3–0 on away goals.

==== Semifinals ====
===== First legs =====
15 May 2019
14:30 (UTC-6)

Guastatoya	1 – 0	Antigua GFC
Á. Rodríguez 82'		Nil

Estadio David Cordón Hichos
Attendance: 1,100
16 May 2019
11:00 (UTC-6)

Malacateco	2 – 2	Cobán Imperial
J. Longo 20'; E. Herrera 53'		51' (o.g.) W.Godoy; 59' E. Guerra

Estadio Santa Lucía
Attendance: 1,722

===== Second legs =====
18 May 2019
15:00 (UTC-6)

Antigua GFC	2 – 0	Guastatoya
Anllel Porras 54' 81'		Nil

Estadio Pensativo

Antigua GFC advances 2-1 on aggregate.

19 May 2019
19:00 (UTC-6)

Cobán Imperial	0–1	Malacateco
Nil		Enzo Herrera 77'

Estadio Verapaz

Malacateco advances 2–3 on aggregate.

==== Final ====
===== First leg =====
23 May 2019
15:00 (UTC-6)

Malacateco	0 – 1	Antigua GFC
Nil		Alejandro Galindo 27'

Estadio Santa Lucía
Referee: Bryan Lopez Castellanos

===== Second leg =====
26 May 2019
15:00 (UTC-6)

Antigua GFC	1–0	Malacateco
Marco Dominguez 81'

Estadio Pensativo
Referee: Oscar Reyna

== Aggregate table ==
Pos	Team	Pld	W	D	L	GF	GA	GD	Pts	Qualification or relegation
1	Guastatoya (Q)	44	22	13	9	61	27	+34	79	CONCACAF League round of 16 (Note: As Apertura champions (GUA1))
2	Comunicaciones (Q)	44	22	11	11	60	30	+30	77	CONCACAF League preliminary round (Note: As runners-up with better aggregate record (GUA3))
3	Cobán Imperial	44	22	10	12	63	45	+18	76	
4	Antigua GFC (Q)	44	21	12	11	60	44	+16	75	CONCACAF League preliminary round (Note: As Clausura champions (GUA2))
5	Malacateco	44	21	11	12	62	52	+10	74	
6	Xelajú	44	19	12	13	55	42	+13	69	
7	Municipal	44	18	10	16	63	52	+11	64	
8	Siquinalá	44	14	14	16	54	57	−3	56	
9	Iztapa	44	13	11	20	44	56	−12	50	
10	Sanarate	44	11	9	24	43	73	−30	42	
11	Chiantla (R)	44	10	11	23	36	63	−27	41	Relegated to Primera División de Ascenso
12	Petapa (R)	44	5	8	31	30	90	−60	23	Relegated to Primera División de Ascenso

Source: Soccerway Soccerway
Rules for classification: 1) points; 2) goal difference; 3) number of goals scored.
(Q) Qualified for the phase indicated; (R) Relegated

== List of foreign players in the league ==
This is a list of foreign players in 2018-2019 season. The following players:

1. have played at least one apertura game for the respective club.
2. have not been capped for the Guatemala national football team on any level, independently from the birthplace.

A new rule was introduced a few season ago, that clubs can only have five foreign players per club and can only add a new player if there is an injury or player/s is released.

Antigua GFC
- (Mexico) Agustin Herrera
- (Argentina) Alejandro Diaz
- (Costa Rica) Jose Mena
- (Costa Rica) Adrián De Lemos
- (Costa Rica) Anllel Porras
- (Costa Rica) Rafael Lezcano
- (Colombia) Juan David Osorio
- (Argentina) Pablo Mingorance

Chiantla
- (Mexico) Luis Omar Hernández
- (Mexico) Liborio Vicente Sánchez
- (Mexico) Sergio Alejandro Blancas Martínez
- (Mexico) José Abraham Alpuche
- (Mexico) Juan Carlos Meza
- (Mexico) Diego Bartolota
- (Mexico) Daniel Guzmán Miranda

Coban Imperial
- (Uruguay) Álvaro García
- (Uruguay) Adrián Elois Leites
- (Brazil) Janderson Pereira
- (El Salvador) Josue Flores
- (Guadeloupe) Victor Guay
- (Uruguay) Jonathan Charquero
- (Argentina) Jorge Luis Sotomayor
- (Paraguay) Orlando Moreira

CSD Comunicaciones
- (Uruguay) Javier Irazún
- (Costa Rica) Michael Umaña
- (El Salvador) Alexander Larin
- (Uruguay) Maximiliano Lombardi
- (Mexico) Darío Carreño
- (Argentina) Cristian Alexis Hernández

Guastatoya
- (Mexico) Isaac Acuña
- (Mexico) Omar Dominguez
- (Mexico) Emmanuel Alejandro Tapia
- (Colombia) Jose Coreno
- (Costa Rica) Aaron Navarro
- (Costa Rica) Jose Sanchez
- (Costa Rica) Jorge Ignacio Gatgens
- (Panama) José Calderón

Deportivo Iztapa
- (Brazil) Rafael Moreira Rafinha
- (Brazil) Fredy Marques
- (Colombia) Luis Alfonso Páez
- (Mexico) Raúl Nava López
- (Argentina) Ramiro Rocca
- (El Salvador) Lester Blanco

Deportivo Malacateco
- (Costa Rica) Víctor Bolivar
- (Costa Rica) Gabriel Leiva
- (Costa Rica) Kenny Cunningham
- (Mexico) Luis Ángel Landín
- (Uruguay) Willinton Techera x

CSD Municipal
- (Costa Rica) Andrey Anthony Francis
- (Costa Rica) Irving Esteban Calderón
- (Argentina) Wálter Aníbal Acevedo
- (Argentina) Jonathan Hansen
- (Argentina) Omar Salazar
- (Uruguay) Matias Malvino
- (Mexico) Othoniel Arce
- (Mexico) Luis Angel Ladin
- (Paraguay) Orlando Moreira
- (Nicaragua) Juan Barrera

Deportivo Petapa
- (Mexico) Raúl Calderón
- (Colombia) Yeltsin Car
- (Cuba)
- (Cuba)

Sanarate
- (Argentina) Juan Lovato
- (Argentina) Cristian Alexis Hernández
- (Argentina) Juan Manuel Lazaneo
- (Argentina) Fabián Castillo
- (Argentina) Lucas Emanuel Acosta
- (Argentina) Cristian Daniel Taborda
- (Costa Rica) Víctor Bolivar
- (Honduras) Jorge Zaldivar
- (Honduras) Jonathan Posas
- (Colombia) William Zapata
- (Mexico) Juan Carlos Silva

Siquinalá
- (Honduras) Quiarol Arzu
- (Mexico) Cesar García
- (Costa Rica) Jean Andrés Scott Hernández
- (Mexico) Othoniel Arce
- (Costa Rica) Verny Scott
- (Costa Rica) Diego Sanchez Corrales
- (Colombia) Luis Gerardo Arroyo
- (Colombia) Julio Andrés Valdez
- (Mexico) Sergio Alejandro Blancas
- (Costa Rica) Christopher Solano

Club Xelajú MC
- (Mexico) Carlos Kamiani
- (Uruguay) Bernardo Long
- (Costa Rica) Álvaro Aguilar
- (Mexico) César Morales
- (Honduras) Juan Yax
- (Uruguay) Dario Ferrera
- (Uruguay) Álvaro García

(player released during the Apertura season) (player released between the Apertura and Clausura seasons) (player released during the Clausura season)
