= 2019–20 Liga Nacional de Guatemala =

67th professional season of the top-flight football league in Guatemala

Liga Nacional de Guatemala
- Season: 2019–20
- Dates: July 2019 – May 2020
- Champions: Apertura: Municipal (31st title); Clausura: Tournament cancelled
- Relegated: Mixco; Siquinalá
- CONCACAF League: Municipal; Comunicaciones; Antigua
- Top goalscorer: Apertura: Ramiro Rocca (16 goals); Clausura: Carlos Kamiani (7 goals)
- Highest attendance: Apertura: 17,647; Municipal 2–2 Antigua (29 December 2019); Clausura: 5,189; Municipal 2–4 Comunicaciones (25 January 2020)
- Average attendance: Apertura: 5,061; Clausura: 2,568

The 2019–20 Liga Nacional de Guatemala was the 67th professional season of the top-flight football league in Guatemala. The season was divided into two championships—the 2019 Apertura and the 2020 Clausura—each in an identical format and each contested by the same 12 teams.

== Teams ==
Location of the 2019–20 Liga Nacional de Fútbol de Guatemala teams

=== Promotion and relegation (pre-season) ===
A total of 12 teams will contest the league, including 10 sides from the 2017–18 Liga Nacional and 2 promoted from the 2017–18 Primera División.

Teams relegated to Primera División de Ascenso

Deportivo Petapa and Chiantla were relegated to 2018–19 Primera División the previous season.

Teams promoted from Primera División de Ascenso

The relegated team was replaced by the 2018–19 Primera División winners. F.C. Santa Lucía Cotzumalguapa and Deportivo Mixco.

=== Personnel and sponsoring ===
Team	Chairman	Head Coach	Captain	Kitmaker	Shirt Sponsors
Antigua	(Guatemala) Víctor Hugo García	(Mexico) Juan Antonio Torres	(Guatemala) TBD	TBD	Tigo, TBD
Cobán Imperial	(Guatemala) Jimmy Morales	(El Salvador) Jorge Rodriguez	(Guatemala) TBD	TBD	Tigo, TBD
Comunicaciones	(Guatemala) Juan Garcia	(Argentina) Mauricio Tapia	(Guatemala) TBD	Nino	Tigo, TBD
Guastatoya	(Guatemala) Léster Rodríguez	(Uruguay) Daniel Alberto Casas Lago	(Guatemala) TBD	TBD	Tigo, TBD
Iztapa	(Guatemala) Mario Mejía	(Guatemala) Alberto Salguero	(Guatemala) TBD	TBD	Tigo, TBD
Malacateco	(Guatemala) Carlos Gutiérrez	(Costa Rica) Ronald Gomez	(Guatemala) TBD	TBD	Tigo, TBD
Mixco	(Guatemala)	(Guatemala) Julio Gomez	(Guatemala) TBD	TBD	Tigo, TBD
Municipal	(Guatemala) Gerardo Villa	(Argentina) Horacio Cordero	(Guatemala) TBD	Umbro	Tigo, TBD
Santa Lucía	(Guatemala) TBD	(Guatemala) Francisco Melgar	(Guatemala) TBD	TBD	Tigo, TBD
Sanarate	(Guatemala) Jahiro Otzoy	(Guatemala) Rafael Díaz	(Guatemala) TBD	TBD	Tigo, TBD
Siquinalá	(Guatemala) Juan Pablo Godíne	(Spain) Antonio Acosta	(Guatemala)	Kelme	TBD
Xelajú	(Guatemala) Francisco Santos	(Guatemala) Walter Horacio González	(Guatemala) TBD	TBD	Tigo, TBD

=== Managerial changes ===
==== Beginning of the season ====
Team	Outgoing manager	Manner of departure	Date of vacancy	Replaced by	Date of appointment	Position in table
Iztapa	(Guatemala)	Resigned	May 2019	(Guatemala) Alberto Salguero	May 2019	th (Clausura 2018)
Guastatoya	(Guatemala) Amarini Villatoro	Resigned	May 2019	(Uruguay) Daniel Alberto Casas Lago	May 2019	th (Clausura 2018)
Sanarate	(Uruguay) Ariel Sena	Contract finished	July 2019	(Guatemala) Rafael Díaz	July 2019	th (Clausura 2018)
Coban Imperial	(Guatemala) Fabricio Benitez	Resigned	May 2019	(El Salvador) Jorge Rodriguez	June 2019	th (Clausura 2018)
Comunicaciones	(Uruguay) William Coito Olivera	Resigned	May 2019	(Argentina) Mauricio Tapia	May 2019	th (Clausura 2018)
Santa Lucía Cotz	(Argentina) Ramiro Cepeda	Resigned	June 2019	(Guatemala) Francisco Melgar	June 2019	th (Clausura 2018)
Siquinalá	(Guatemala) Otto Rodriguez	Resigned	June 2019	(Spain) Antonio Acosta	June 2019	th (Clausura 2018)
Antigua GFC	(Mexico) Juan Antonio Torres	Resigned	June 2019	(Mexico) Roberto Montoya	June 2019	th (Clausura 2018)

==== During the Apertura season ====
Team	Outgoing manager	Manner of departure	Date of vacancy	Replaced by	Date of appointment	Position in table
Municipal	(Argentina) Horacio Cordero	Resigned	August 2019	(Argentina) Sebastián Bini	August 2019	th (Clausura 2018)
Guastatoya	(Uruguay) Daniel Casas	Sacked	September 2019	(Guatemala) Fabricio Benitez	September 2019	th (Clausura 2018)
Mixco	(Guatemala) Julio Gomez	Sacked	September 2019	(Guatemala) Walter Claverí	September 2019	th (Clausura 2018)
Izatapa	(Guatemala) Alberto Salguero	Sacked	September 2019	(Argentina) Ramiro Cepeda	September 2019	th (Clausura 2018)
Xelaju MC	(Guatemala) Walter Horacio González	Resigned	November 2019	(Argentina) TBD	November 2019	th (Clausura 2018)

=== Between Apertura and Clausura seasons ===
Team	Outgoing manager	Manner of departure	Date of vacancy	Replaced by	Date of appointment	Position in table
TBD	(Guatemala) TBD	Resigned	July 2019	(Argentina) TBD	July 2019	th (Clausura 2018)

==== During the Clausura season ====
Team	Outgoing manager	Manner of departure	Date of vacancy	Replaced by	Date of appointment	Position in table
TBD	(Guatemala) TBD	Resigned	July 2019	(Argentina) TBD	July 2019	th (Clausura 2018)

== Apertura ==
=== League table ===
Pos	Team	Pld	W	D	L	GF	GA	GD	Pts	Qualification or relegation
1	Cobán Imperial	22	12	5	5	34	23	+11	41	Advance to Playoffs (Semifinals)
2	Municipal	22	12	4	6	32	23	+9	40	Advance to Playoffs (Semifinals)
3	Comunicaciones	22	11	6	5	33	21	+12	39	Advance to Playoffs (Quarterfinals)
4	Antigua GFC	22	11	4	7	30	23	+7	37	Advance to Playoffs (Quarterfinals)
5	Sanarate	22	11	4	7	27	24	+3	37	Advance to Playoffs (Quarterfinals)
6	Guastatoya	22	10	5	7	29	22	+7	35	Advance to Playoffs (Quarterfinals)
7	Malacateco	22	9	4	9	29	24	+5	31	
8	Iztapa	22	9	4	9	28	26	+2	31	
9	Xelajú	22	7	7	8	26	27	−1	28	
10	Santa Lucía	22	5	7	10	21	29	−8	22	
11	Mixco	22	4	4	14	18	41	−23	16	
12	Siquinalá	22	2	4	16	20	44	−24	10	

Source: Soccerway
Rules for classification: 1) points; 2) goal difference; 3) number of goals scored.

=== Results ===
Home \ Away	ANT	LUC	COB	COM	GUA	IZT	MAL	MUN	MIX	SAN	SIQ	XEL
Antigua GFC												
Santa Lucía												
Cobán Imperial												
Comunicaciones												
Guastatoya												
Iztapa												
Malacateco												
Municipal												
Mixco												
Sanarate												
Siquinalá												
Xelajú												

Legend: Blue = home team win; Yellow = draw; Red = away team win.

=== Attendances ===
Comunicaciones drew the highest average home attendance in the Apertura.

#	Football club	Home games	Average attendance
1	Comunicaciones	11	8,312
2	Antigua GFC	11	7,782
3	CSD Municipal	11	7,578
4	Cobán Imperial	11	7,012
5	Xelaju MC	11	6,674
6	Santa Lucía	11	5,389
7	Deportivo Sanarate	11	5,336
8	Deportivo Siquinalá	11	3,163
9	Deportivo Guastatoya	11	3,012
10	Deportivo Mixco	11	2,769
11	Deportivo Malacateco	11	2,456
12	Deportivo Iztapa	11	1,253

== Clausura ==
=== League table ===
Pos	Team	Pld	W	D	L	GF	GA	GD	Pts	Qualification or relegation
1	Comunicaciones	13	8	4	1	26	15	+11	28	Advance to Playoffs (Semifinals)
2	Municipal	13	6	5	2	17	12	+5	23	Advance to Playoffs (Semifinals)
3	Guastatoya	13	6	3	4	13	10	+3	21	Advance to Playoffs (Quarterfinals)
4	Iztapa	13	5	5	3	19	18	+1	20	Advance to Playoffs (Quarterfinals)
5	Antigua GFC	13	5	4	4	15	11	+4	19	Advance to Playoffs (Quarterfinals)
6	Siquinalá	13	4	4	5	17	17	0	16	Advance to Playoffs (Quarterfinals)
7	Mixco	13	4	3	6	14	14	0	15	
8	Santa Lucía	13	3	6	4	13	18	−5	15	
9	Xelajú	13	2	7	4	12	15	−3	13	
10	Malacateco	13	3	4	6	9	14	−5	13	
11	Sanarate	13	4	3	6	13	17	−4	12	
12	Cobán Imperial	13	2	4	7	8	15	−7	10	

Source: Soccerway
Rules for classification: 1) points; 2) goal difference; 3) number of goals scored.

=== Results ===
Home \ Away	ANT	LUC	COB	COM	GUA	IZT	MAL	MUN	MIX	SAN	SIQ	XEL
Antigua GFC												
Santa Lucía												
Cobán Imperial												
Comunicaciones												
Guastatoya												
Iztapa												
Malacateco												
Municipal												
Mixco												
Sanarate												
Siquinalá												
Xelajú												

Legend: Blue = home team win; Yellow = draw; Red = away team win.

== Aggregate table ==
Pos	Team	Pld	W	D	L	GF	GA	GD	Pts	Qualification or relegation
1	Comunicaciones	35	19	10	6	59	36	+23	67	CONCACAF League preliminary round (Note: As Clausura champions (GUA2))
2	Municipal	35	18	9	8	49	35	+14	63	CONCACAF League round of 16 (Note: As Apertura champions (GUA1))
3	Guastatoya	35	16	8	11	42	32	+10	56	
4	Antigua GFC	35	16	8	11	42	35	+7	56	CONCACAF League preliminary round (Note: As runners-up with better aggregate record (GUA3))
5	Cobán Imperial	35	14	9	12	42	38	+4	51	
6	Iztapa	35	14	9	12	47	44	+3	51	
7	Sanarate	35	15	7	13	40	41	−1	49	
8	Malacateco	35	12	8	15	38	34	+4	44	
9	Xelajú	35	9	14	12	38	42	−4	41	
10	Santa Lucía	35	8	13	14	34	47	−13	37	
11	Mixco	35	8	7	20	32	55	−23	31	Relegated to Primera División de Ascenso
12	Siquinalá	35	6	8	21	37	61	−24	26	Relegated to Primera División de Ascenso

Source: Soccerway
Rules for classification: 1) points; 2) goal difference; 3) number of goals scored.

== List of foreign players in the league ==
This is a list of foreign players in 2019-2020 season. The following players:

1. have played at least one apertura game for the respective club.
2. have not been capped for the Guatemala national football team on any level, independently from the birthplace.

A new rule was introduced a few season ago, that clubs can only have five foreign players per club and can only add a new player if there is an injury or player/s is released.

Antigua GFC

- (Costa Rica) Jose Mena
- (Costa Rica) Anllel Porras
- (Costa Rica) Rafael Lezcano
- (Mexico) Edgar Pacheco
- (Mexico) Ricardo Álvarez Arce

Coban Imperial

- (Brazil) Janderson Pereira
- (El Salvador) Josue Flores
- (Guadeloupe) Victor Guay
- (Argentina) Jorge Luis Sotomayor
- (Paraguay) Lauro Ramón Cazal
- (Costa Rica) Josue Mitchell Omier
- (El Salvador) Gerson Mayen
- (El Salvador) Derby Carrillo

CSD Comunicaciones

- (Costa Rica) Michael Umaña
- (Panama) José Calderón
- (Uruguay) Maximiliano Lombardi
- (Mexico) Darío Carreño
- (Argentina) Cristian Alexis Hernández
- (Mexico) Agustin Herrera
- (Costa Rica) Rafael Lezcano
- (Colombia) Bladimir Díaz
- (Costa Rica) Jostin Daly

Guastatoya

- (Mexico) Luis Landín
- (Mexico) Omar Dominguez
- (Mexico) Daniel Guzman
- (Costa Rica) Aaron Navarro
- (Costa Rica) Jorge Ignacio Gatgens
- (Honduras) Santos Crisanto
- (Costa Rica) Adrián de Lemos
- (El Salvador) Irvin Herrera

Deportivo Iztapa

- (Mexico) Sergio Blancas
- (Argentina) Ramiro Rocca
- (Mexico) Liborio Vicente Sánchez
- (El Salvador) Kevin Santamaria
- (Honduras) Byron Rodríguez
- (Mexico) Carlos Felix

Deportivo Malacateco

- (Costa Rica) Daniel Cambronero
- (Costa Rica) Andrey Francis
- (Uruguay) Claudio Inella
- (Uruguay) Enzo Herrera
- (El Salvador) Henry Hernandez
- (Colombia) Luis Hurtado

(player released during the Apertura season) (player released between the Apertura and Clausura seasons) (player released during the Clausura season)

Mixco

- (El Salvador) Dustin Corea
- (Costa Rica) Ronny Stuart Mora

CSD Municipal

- (Mexico) Othoniel Arce
- (Paraguay) Orlando Moreira
- (Argentina) Alejandro Diaz
- (Argentina) Ramiro Rocca
- (Trinidad and Tobago) Mekeil Andy Williams
- (Paraguay) Nicolás Martínez Ramos

F.C. Santa Lucía Cotzumalguapa

- (Brazil) Rafael Da Roza
- (Honduras) Ángel Tejeda
- (Costa Rica) Diego Sanchez
- (Argentina) Juan Leroyer
- (Honduras) Santos Crisanto

Sanarate

- (Brazil) (Uruguay) Dario Silva
- (Honduras) Jorge Zaldivar
- (Honduras) Jonathan Posas
- (Colombia) William Zapata
- (Mexico) Juan Carlos Silva

Siquinalá

- (Spain) Alvaro Portero Diez
- (Spain) José Ortega
- (South Korea) You Ki Sun
- (Colombia) Marlon Negrete
- (Uruguay) Willinton Techera

Club Xelajú MC

- (Mexico) Carlos Felix
- (Honduras) Juan Yax
- (Uruguay) Darío Ferreira
- (Uruguay) Álvaro García
- (Argentina) Gonzalo Vivanco
- (Costa Rica) José Carlos Pérez
- (Uruguay) Jhonatan Souza Motta
- (Argentina) Oscar Belinetz
- (El Salvador) David Rugamas
