= Edgardo Mira =

Footballer (born 1993)

Personal information
- Full name: Edgardo Arnulfo Mira Abrego
- Date of birth: 10 March 1993 (age 33)
- Place of birth: Guatemala City, Guatemala
- Height: 1.74 m (5 ft 9 in)
- Positions: Defender; midfielder

Youth career
- 2007: Turín FESA
- 2008: Sevilla (Under 19)
- 2010: Cyclones Calí (Under 20)
- 2010–2011: Atlético Marte (reserves)

Senior career*
Years	Team	Apps	(Gls)
2013–2015	Oral Roberts Golden Eagles	50	(13)
2015–2017	Sonsonate	67	(3)
2017–2018	Siquinala	13	(0)
2018	Chalatenango	23	(1)
2019	Chiantla		
2019	Águila		
2020	Malacateco		

International career^{‡}
2018	El Salvador	1	(0)
- * Club domestic league appearances and goals ‡ National team caps and goals as of 18 January 2019

Edgardo Arnulfo Mira Abrego (born 10 March 1993) is a professional footballer who plays as a defender for League for Clubs club Tulsa Athletic. Born in Guatemala, he represented the El Salvador national team.

== International career ==
Mira officially received his first cap on 2 June 2018 in a friendly match against Honduras.
