= 2017–18 Liga Nacional de Guatemala =

65th professional season of the top-flight football league in Guatemala

Liga Nacional de Guatemala
- Season: 2017–18
- Champions: Apertura: Antigua (3rd title); Clausura: Guastatoya (1st title)
- Relegated: Suchitepéquez; Marquense
- Champions League: None due to FA suspension
- CONCACAF League: None due to FA suspension
- Matches: 72
- Goals: 174 (2.42 per match)
- Biggest home win: Comunicaciones 5–1 Marquense (23 September 2017)
- Biggest away win: Marquense 0–7 Municipal (2018)
- Average attendance: Apertura: 1,652

The 2017–18 Liga Nacional de Guatemala was the 65th professional season of the top-flight football league in Guatemala. The season was divided into two championships—the 2017 Apertura and the 2018 Clausura—each in an identical format and each contested by the same 12 teams.

== Format ==
The format for both championships are identical. Each championship will have two stages: a first stage and a playoff stage. The first stage of each championship is a double round-robin format. The teams that finish first and second in the standings will advance to the playoffs semifinals, while the teams that finish 3–6 will enter in the quarterfinals. The winner of each quarterfinal will advance to the semifinals. The winners of the semifinals will advance to the finals, which will determine the tournament champion.

== Managerial changes ==
=== Beginning of the season ===
| Team | Outgoing manager | Manner of departure | Date of vacancy | Replaced by | Date of appointment | Position in table |
|---|---|---|---|---|---|---|
| Malacateco | (Costa Rica) | Resigned | May 2017 | (Costa Rica) Mauricio Wright | May 2017 | th (Clausura 2018) |

=== During the Apertura season ===
| Team | Outgoing manager | Manner of departure | Date of vacancy | Replaced by | Date of appointment | Position in table |
|---|---|---|---|---|---|---|
| Sanarate | (Guatemala) Héctor Julián Trujillo | Resigned | October 2017 | (Argentina) Horacio Cordero | October 2017 | th (Apertura 2015) |
| Deportivo Marquense | (Guatemala) Óscar Ulises Sosa | Sacked | September 2017 | (Guatemala) Gabriel Castillo | September 2017 | th (Apertura 2015) |
| Cobán Imperial | (Uruguay) Ariel Sena | Sacked | August 2017 | (Guatemala) Fabricio Benitez | August 2017 | th (Apertura 2015) |
| Municipal | (Uruguay) Gustavo Machaín | Sacked | Oct 2017 | (Paraguay) Ever Hugo Almeida | Oct 2017 | th (Apertura 2015) |
| C.D. Suchitepequez | (Guatemala) Walter Claverí | Sacked | Oct 2017 | (Guatemala) Erick González | Oct 2017 | th (Apertura 2015) |

=== Between Apertura and Clausura seasons ===
| Team | Outgoing manager | Manner of departure | Date of vacancy | Replaced by | Date of appointment | Position in table |
|---|---|---|---|---|---|---|
| Municipal | (Paraguay) Éver Hugo Almeida | Contract finished | December 2017 | (Costa Rica) Hernan Medford | December 2017 | and Runners up (Apertura 2017) |
| Suchitepéquez | (Guatemala) Erick González | Contract finished | December 2017 | (Peru) Agustin Castillo | December 2017 | (Apertura 2017) |
| Sanarate | (Argentina) Horacio Cordero | Resigned | December 2017 | (Argentina) Pablo Centrone | December 2017 | th (Apertura 2015) |
| Siquinalá | (Guatemala) Jairo Pérez | Sacked | December 2017 | (Argentina) Daniel Berta | December 2017 | (Apertura 2017) |

=== During the Apertura season ===
| Team | Outgoing manager | Manner of departure | Date of vacancy | Replaced by | Date of appointment | Position in table |
|---|---|---|---|---|---|---|
| Suchitepéquez | (Peru) Agustin Castillo | Sacked | February 2018 | (Uruguay) Eduardo Méndez | 2018 | th (Clausura 2018) |
| Xelaju MC | (Costa Rica) Ronald Gómez | Sacked | February 2018 | (Guatemala) Walter Claveri | February 2018 | th (Clausura 2018) |
| Malacateco | (Costa Rica) Mauricio Wright | Resigned | February 2018 | (Costa Rica) Ronald Gómez | February 2018 | th (Clausura 2018) |
| Comunicaciones | (Costa Rica) Ronald González | Sacked | February 2018 | (Uruguay) Willy Coito Olivera | February 2018 | (Apertura 2017) |
| Marquense | (Guatemala) Gabriel Castillo | Sacked | April 2018 | (Argentina) Aldo Da Pozzo | April 2018 | th (Clausura 2018) |

== Apertura ==
The 2017 Torneo Apertura began on 28 July 2017 and will end in December 2017.

=== Personnel and sponsoring ===
| Team | Chairman | Head coach | Kitmaker | Shirt sponsor |
|---|---|---|---|---|
| Antigua | (Guatemala) Rafael Arreaga | (Argentina) Mauricio Tapia | TBD | Banrural, Horcalba, Pepsi |
| Cobán Imperial | (Guatemala) Irasema Meléndez | (Uruguay) Ariel Sena | Puma | TBD |
| Comunicaciones | (Mexico) Pedro Portilla | (Costa Rica) Ronald González | Puma | Todo en Salud, Gatorade, Zeta Gas |
| Guastatoya | (Guatemala) | (Guatemala) Amarini Villatoro | TBD | TBD |
| Malacateco | (Guatemala) TBD | (Costa Rica) Mauricio Wright | TBD | TBD |
| Marquense | (Guatemala) TBD | (Argentina) Néstor Emilio Soria | TBD | TBD |
| Municipal | (Guatemala) TBD | (Uruguay) Gustavo Machaín | TBD | TBD |
| Petapa | (Guatemala) Mynor Morales | (Argentina) Ramiro Cepeda | TBD | TBD |
| Sanarate | (Guatemala) TBD | (Argentina) Héctor Julián Trujillo | | |
| Siquinalá | (Guatemala) TBD | (Guatemala) Jairo Pérez | | |
| Suchitepéquez | (Guatemala) TBD | (Guatemala) Walter Claverí | TBD | TBD |
| Xelajú | (Guatemala) TBD | (Costa Rica) Ronald Gómez | RetoSports | TBD |

=== Table ===
==== Standings ====
| Pos | Team | Pld | W | D | L | GF | GA | GD | Pts | Qualification |
|---|---|---|---|---|---|---|---|---|---|---|
| 1 | Antigua GFC | 22 | 11 | 5 | 6 | 35 | 16 | +19 | 38 | Qualified to the Semifinals |
| 2 | Petapa | 22 | 11 | 5 | 6 | 35 | 19 | +16 | 38 | Qualified to the Semifinals |
| 3 | Municipal | 22 | 9 | 8 | 5 | 24 | 18 | +6 | 35 | Qualified to the Quarterfinals |
| 4 | Xelajú MC | 22 | 10 | 5 | 7 | 30 | 27 | +3 | 35 | Qualified to the Quarterfinals |
| 5 | Cobán Imperial | 22 | 9 | 8 | 5 | 28 | 25 | +3 | 35 | Qualified to the Quarterfinals |
| 6 | Guastatoya | 22 | 9 | 7 | 6 | 33 | 21 | +12 | 34 | Qualified to the Quarterfinals |
| 7 | Comunicaciones | 22 | 9 | 7 | 6 | 28 | 20 | +8 | 34 | |
| 8 | Malacateco | 22 | 7 | 5 | 10 | 29 | 29 | 0 | 26 | |
| 9 | Sanarate | 22 | 7 | 5 | 10 | 14 | 22 | −8 | 26 | |
| 10 | Suchitepéquez | 22 | 6 | 4 | 12 | 24 | 43 | −19 | 22 | |
| 11 | Siquinalá | 22 | 6 | 2 | 14 | 19 | 38 | −19 | 20 | |
| 12 | Marquense | 22 | 5 | 5 | 12 | 18 | 39 | −21 | 20 | |

Updated to match(es) played on 26 November 2017. Source:
Rules for classification: 1) points; 2) goal difference; 3) number of goals scored.

==== Results ====
| Home \ Away | ANT | COB | COM | GUA | MAL | MAR | MUN | PET | SAN | SIQ | SUC | XEL |
|---|---|---|---|---|---|---|---|---|---|---|---|---|
| Antigua GFC | | 2–0 | 0–0 | 2–1 | 4–0 | 2–1 | 1–1 | 2–0 | 2–0 | 2–0 | 5–0 | 2–0 |
| Coban Imperial | 1–1 | | 3–2 | 4–2 | 1–0 | 2–0 | 3–1 | 2–2 | 2–0 | 1–1 | 2–1 | 1–1 |
| Comunicaciones | 2–1 | 0–0 | | 1–0 | 3–0 | 5–1 | 1–1 | 3–1 | 0–1 | 1–0 | 2–0 | 2–1 |
| Guastatoya | 0–0 | 2–0 | 2–0 | | 3–1 | 4–2 | 1–2 | 2–1 | 1–0 | 3–0 | 4–1 | 3–0 |
| Malacateco | 0–3 | 5–0 | 2–0 | 2–2 | | 4–0 | 1–1 | 3–0 | 0–0 | 2–0 | 3–0 | 1–2 |
| Marquense | 2–2 | 1–1 | 2–0 | 1–1 | 1–0 | | 1–0 | 0–4 | 0–1 | 1–0 | 2–0 | 1–1 |
| Municipal | 1–0 | 1–0 | 0–0 | 0–0 | 2–1 | 1–0 | | 0–1 | 2–0 | 2–0 | 2–0 | 0–1 |
| Petapa | 2–0 | 0–0 | 0–0 | 1–0 | 0–1 | 2–0 | 1–1 | | 1–1 | 3–0 | 3–0 | 3–0 |
| Sanarate | 0–2 | 0–1 | 1–1 | 1–0 | 1–1 | 0–0 | 2–1 | 0–2 | | 1–0 | 2–0 | 2–0 |
| Siquinalá | 3–2 | 0–2 | 0–3 | 1–1 | 3–1 | 4–0 | 1–2 | 1–4 | 1–0 | | 2–0 | 2–1 |
| Suchitepéquez | 1–0 | 2–2 | 2–2 | 1–1 | 3–1 | 3–1 | 1–1 | 1–3 | 1–0 | 2–0 | | 4–1 |
| Xelajú MC | 1–0 | 1–0 | 2–0 | 0–0 | 0–0 | 2–1 | 2–2 | 2–1 | 4–1 | 4–0 | 4–1 | |

Updated to match(es) played on 1 October 2017. Source:
Legend: Blue = home team win; Yellow = draw; Red = away team win.

=== Final phase ===
Quarterfinals
4 | Guastatoya | 1 | 0 | 1
5 | Municipal | 1 | 2 | 3
3 | Cobán Imperial | 1 | 2 | 3
6 | Xelajú MC | 1 | 2 | 3

Semifinals
Cobán Imperial | 1 | 0 | 1
1 | Antigua GFC | 0 | 1 | 1
Municipal | 2 | 3 | 5
2 | Petapa | 1 | 0 | 1

Final
Municipal | 1 | 1 | 2
Antigua GFC | 1 | 2 | 3

=== Quarterfinals ===
| Team 1 | Agg. | Team 2 | 1st leg | 2nd leg |
|---|---|---|---|---|
| Guastatoya | 1 – 3 | Municipal | 1 – 1 | 0 – 2 |
| Cobán Imperial | 3 – 3 | Xelajú MC | 1 – 1 | 2 – 2 |

Cobán Imperial wins on away goals

==== First leg ====
November 29, 2017

| Guastatoya | 1 – 1 | Municipal |
|---|---|---|
| Mejía 73' | Report | Pérez 63' |

Estadio David Cordón Hichos

December 1, 2017

| Cobán Imperial | 1 – 1 | Xelajú MC |
|---|---|---|
| Álvarez 85' | Report | Albizures 15' |

Estadio Verapaz

==== Second leg ====
December 2, 2017

| Municipal | 2 – 0 | Guastatoya |
|---|---|---|
| Lopez 31'; Suénaga 64' | Report |

Estadio El Trébol

December 4, 2017

| Xelajú MC | 2 – 2 | Cobán Imperial |
|---|---|---|
| Brand 45+1', 68' (pen.) | Report | Guerra 19' (pen.), 38' |

Estadio Mario Camposeco

=== Semifinals ===
| Team 1 | Agg. | Team 2 | 1st leg | 2nd leg |
|---|---|---|---|---|
| Cobán Imperial | 1 – 1 | Antigua GFC | 1 – 0 | 0 – 1 |
| Municipal | 5 – 1 | Petapa | 2 – 1 | 3 – 0 |

Antigua GFC wins on away goals

==== First leg ====
December 7, 2017

| Cobán Imperial | 1 – 0 | Antigua GFC |
|---|---|---|
| Lombardi 62' | Report |

Estadio Verapaz

December 8, 2017

| Municipal | 2 – 1 | Petapa |
|---|---|---|
| Suénaga 42'; Lopez 48' | Report | López 60' (o.g.) |

Estadio Mateo Flores

==== Second leg ====
December 9, 2017

| Antigua GFC | 1 – 0 | Cobán Imperial |
|---|---|---|
| Herrera 74' | Report |

Estadio Pensativo

December 11, 2017

| Petapa | 0 – 3 | Municipal |
|---|---|---|
| | Report | Reyna 3'; Martínez 63'; Pérez 87' |

Estadio Municipal de San Miguel Petapa

=== Finals ===
| Team 1 | Agg. | Team 2 | 1st leg | 2nd leg |
|---|---|---|---|---|
| Municipal | 2 – 3 | Antigua GFC | 1 – 1 | 1 – 2 |

==== First leg ====
December 15, 2017

| Municipal | 1 – 1 | Antigua GFC |
|---|---|---|
| Baloy 83' | Report | Lopez 47' (o.g.) |

Estadio Mateo Flores
Referee: Walter Lopez Castellanos

==== Second leg ====
December 17, 2017

| Antigua GFC | 2 – 1 | Municipal |
|---|---|---|
| Mena 16'; Díaz 52' | Report | Reyna 41' |

Estadio Pensativo

Apertura 2017 champions

3rd title

== Clausura ==
The 2018 Torneo Clausura is expected to begin in January 2018 and end in May 2018.

=== Personnel and sponsoring ===
| Team | Chairman | Head coach | Kitmaker | Shirt sponsor |
|---|---|---|---|---|
| Antigua | (Guatemala) Rafael Arreaga | (Argentina) Mauricio Tapia | TBD | Pegamex |
| Cobán Imperial | (Guatemala) TBD | (Guatemala) Fabricio Benítez | Puma | TBD |
| Comunicaciones | (Mexico) Pedro Portilla | (Uruguay) Willy Coito Olivera | Puma | Todo en Salud, Gatorade, Zeta Gas |
| Guastatoya | (Guatemala) Lester Rodríguez | (Guatemala) Amarini Villatoro | TBD | TBD |
| Malacateco | (Guatemala) TBD | (Costa Rica) Ronald Gomez | TBD | TBD |
| Marquense | (Guatemala) TBD | (Argentina) Aldo Da Pozzo | TBD | TBD |
| Municipal | (Guatemala) Gerardo Villa | (Costa Rica) Hernán Medford | TBD | TBD |
| Petapa | (Guatemala) TBD | (Argentina) Ramiro Cepeda | TBD | TBD |
| Sanarate | (Guatemala) TBD | (Argentina) Pablo Centrone | | |
| Siquinalá | (Guatemala) TBD | (Argentina) Daniel Berta | | |
| Suchitepéquez | (Guatemala) TBD | (Guatemala) Othoniel Arce | TBD | TBD |
| Xelajú | (Guatemala) TBD | (Guatemala) Wálter Claverí | RetoSports | TBD |

=== Table ===
==== Standings ====
| Pos | Team | Pld | W | D | L | GF | GA | GD | Pts | Qualification |
|---|---|---|---|---|---|---|---|---|---|---|
| 1 | Sanarate | 22 | 11 | 7 | 4 | 29 | 14 | +15 | 40 | Qualified to the Semifinals |
| 2 | Cobán Imperial | 22 | 12 | 3 | 7 | 32 | 21 | +11 | 39 | Qualified to the Semifinals |
| 3 | Guastatoya | 22 | 11 | 5 | 6 | 27 | 18 | +9 | 38 | Qualified to the Quarterfinals |
| 4 | Antigua GFC | 22 | 11 | 4 | 7 | 42 | 34 | +8 | 37 | Qualified to the Quarterfinals |
| 5 | Xelajú MC | 22 | 9 | 4 | 9 | 31 | 31 | 0 | 31 | Qualified to the Quarterfinals |
| 6 | Siquinalá | 22 | 8 | 7 | 7 | 20 | 22 | −2 | 31 | Qualified to the Quarterfinals |
| 7 | Comunicaciones | 22 | 8 | 5 | 9 | 22 | 26 | −4 | 29 | |
| 8 | Petapa | 22 | 9 | 2 | 11 | 27 | 33 | −6 | 29 | |
| 9 | Municipal | 22 | 8 | 4 | 10 | 34 | 28 | +6 | 28 | |
| 10 | Suchitepéquez | 22 | 7 | 4 | 11 | 29 | 36 | −7 | 25 | |
| 11 | Malacateco | 22 | 7 | 4 | 11 | 25 | 32 | −7 | 25 | |
| 12 | Marquense | 22 | 4 | 5 | 13 | 16 | 39 | −23 | 17 | |

(May 07, 2018) Publication of the date=15/04/2018 page 60

==== Results ====
| Home \ Away | ANT | COB | COM | GUA | MAL | MAR | MUN | PET | SAN | SIQ | SUC | XEL |
|---|---|---|---|---|---|---|---|---|---|---|---|---|
| Antigua GFC | | 1–3 | 1–2 | 1–1 | 4–3 | 4–1 | 3–2 | 1–2 | 2–0 | 2–0 | 2–3 | 3–1 |
| Cobán Imperial | 2–1 | | 2–1 | 2–0 | 3–1 | 1–1 | 3–1 | 4–2 | 0–0 | 2–0 | 4–2 | 2–1 |
| Comunicaciones | 0–2 | 1–0 | | 0–2 | 2–0 | 2–1 | 0–1 | 3–2 | 1–1 | 0–0 | 1–0 | 2–0 |
| Guastatoya | 3–2 | 1–0 | 1–0 | | 3–0 | 2–0 | 2–0 | 1–0 | 2–1 | 1–1 | 1–2 | 3–1 |
| Malacateco | 0–1 | 1–0 | 3–0 | 2–1 | | 2–0 | 2–2 | 1–0 | 3–3 | 2–0 | 1–0 | 2–2 |
| Marquense | 2–2 | 0–0 | 0–1 | 1–1 | 1–0 | | 0–7 | 2–1 | 2–1 | 1–2 | 2–1 | 1–2 |
| Municipal | 1–2 | 0–1 | 1–1 | 1–0 | 2–0 | 4–1 | | 4–0 | 0–2 | 0–1 | 2–0 | 2–3 |
| Petapa | 2–2 | 2–1 | 2–1 | 0–1 | 2–1 | 1–0 | 0–1 | | 1–0 | 3–0 | 2–3 | 2–0 |
| Sanarate | 0–0 | 1–0 | 0–0 | 1–1 | 1–0 | 3–0 | 3–0 | 4–0 | | 1–0 | 1–0 | 1–0 |
| Siquinalá | 1–2 | 2–0 | 1–1 | 1–0 | 0–0 | 1–0 | 2–1 | 0–0 | 1–1 | | 2–0 | 2–1 |
| Suchitepéquez | 1–3 | 1–0 | 3–2 | 2–0 | 3–1 | 0–0 | 0–0 | 2–3 | 1–3 | 1–1 | | 1–1 |
| Xelajú MC | 3–0 | 1–2 | 3–1 | 0–0 | 2–0 | 1–0 | 2–2 | 1–0 | 0–1 | 2–1 | 4–3 | |

Updated to match(es) played on 2017. Source:
Legend: Blue = home team win; Yellow = draw; Red = away team win.

=== Final phase ===
Quarterfinals
4 | Antigua GFC | 0 | 0 | 0
5 | Xelajú MC | 2 | 1 | 3
3 | Guastatoya | 1 | 4 | 5
6 | Siquinalá | 1 | 0 | 1

Semifinals
Sanarate | 1 | 1 | 2
Xelajú MC | 2 | 1 | 3
Cobán Imperial | 0 | 0 | 0
Guastatoya | 1 | 0 | 1

Final
Xelaju MC | 1 | 0 | 1
Guastatoya | 1 | 2 | 3

=== Quarterfinals ===
| Team 1 | Agg. | Team 2 | 1st leg | 2nd leg |
|---|---|---|---|---|
| Antigua GFC | 0 – 3 | Xelajú MC | 0 – 2 | 0 – 1 |
| Guastatoya | 5 – 1 | Siquinalá | 1 – 1 | 4 – 0 |

==== First leg ====
May 11, 2018
TBA UTC−6

| Xelajú MC | 2 – 0 | Antigua GFC |
|---|---|---|
| Mario Castellanos 14'; Jorge Mario Ortiz 18' | | None |

Estadio Mario Camposeco, Quetzaltenango

May 10, 2018
TBA UTC−6

| Siquinalá | 1 – 1 | Guastatoya |
|---|---|---|
| Oscar Martinez 72' | | Jose Corena 14' |

==== Second leg ====
May 14, 2018
TBA UTC−6

| Antigua GFC | 0 – 1 | Xelaju MC |
|---|---|---|
| None | | Juan Carlos Silva 90' |

Estadio Pensativo, Antigua

Xelaju won 3-0 on aggregate.

May 13, 2018
TBA UTC−6

| Guastatoya | 4 – 0 | Siquinalá |
|---|---|---|
| Angel Rodriguez 13' 65'; Fredy Orellana 74'; Jorge Vargas 84' | | None |

Estadio David Cordón Hichos, Guastatoya

Guastatoya won 5-1 on aggregate.

=== Semifinals ===
| Team 1 | Agg. | Team 2 | 1st leg | 2nd leg |
|---|---|---|---|---|
| Sanarate | 2 – 3 | Xelajú MC | 1 – 2 | 1 – 1 |
| Cobán Imperial | 0 – 1 | Guastatoya | 0 – 1 | 0 – 0 |

==== First leg ====
May 18, 2018
TBA UTC−6

| Xelajú MC | 2 – 1 | Sanarate |
|---|---|---|
| Mario Castellanos 39'; Jorge Mario Ortiz 44' | | Erickson Pinzon 76' |

Estadio Mario Camposeco, Quetzaltenango

May 18, 2018
TBA UTC−6

| Guastatoya | 1 – 0 | Cobán Imperial |
|---|---|---|
| Omar Dominguez 88' | | None |

Estadio David Cordón Hichos, Guastatoya

==== Second leg ====
May 20, 2018
TBA UTC−6

| Sanarate | 1 – 1 | Xelajú MC |
|---|---|---|
| Kevin Elias 60' | | Jorge Mario Ortiz 70' |

Estadio Municipal de Sanarate, Sanarate

Xelajú MC won 3-2 on aggregate.

May 21, 2018
TBA UTC−6

| Cobán Imperial | 0 – 0 | Guastatoya |
|---|---|---|
| None | | None |

Estadio Verapaz Jose Angel Rossi, Cobán

Guastatoya won 1-0 on aggregate.

=== Finals ===
| Team 1 | Agg. | Team 2 | 1st leg | 2nd leg |
|---|---|---|---|---|
| Xelaju MC | 1 – 3 | Guastatoya | 1 – 1 | 0 – 2 |

==== First leg ====
May 23, 2018
TBA UTC−6

| Xelaju MC | 1 – 1 | Guastatoya |
|---|---|---|
| Héctor Moreira 47' | | Ángel Rodriguez 64' |

Estadio Mario Camposeco, Quetzaltenango

==== Second leg ====
May 2018
TBA UTC−6

| Guastatoya | 2 – 0 | Xelaju MC |
|---|---|---|
| Jorge Vargas 23'; Fredy Orellana 70' | | None |

Estadio David Cordón Hichos, Guastatoya

Clausura 2018 champions

1st title

== List of foreign players in the league ==
This is a list of foreign players in 2017-2018 season. The following players:

1. have played at least one apertura game for the respective club.
2. have not been capped for the Guatemala national football team on any level, independently from the birthplace

A new rule was introduced a few season ago, that clubs can only have five foreign players per club and can only add a new player if there is an injury or player/s is released.

Antigua GFC

- (Mexico) Agustin Herrera
- (Argentina) Alejandro Diaz
- (Costa Rica) José Antonio Mena
- (Costa Rica) Adrián De Lemos Calderón
- (Costa Rica) Allan Miranda
- (Argentina) Fabián Arsenio Castillo
- (Costa Rica) Manfred Russell
- (Saint Kitts and Nevis) Devaughn Elliot

Coban Imperial

- (Uruguay) Maximiliano Lombardi
- (Uruguay) Ignacio Flores
- (Uruguay) Álvaro García
- (Guadeloupe) Victor Guay

CSD Comunicaciones

- (Uruguay) Javier Irazún
- (Costa Rica) Manfred Russell
- (Mexico) Isaac Acuna
- (Mexico) Cesar Morales
- (Argentina) Emiliano Lopez
- (Costa Rica) Diego Estrada
- (Costa Rica) Éric Scott

Guastatoya

- (El Salvador) Josue Flores
- (Mexico) Omar Dominguez
- (Uruguay) Miguel Puglia
- (Colombia) Jose Coreno
- (Costa Rica) Aaron Navarro
- (Bolivia) José Gabriel Ríos

Deportivo Malacateco

- (Costa Rica) Rafael Lezcano
- (Colombia) Jhon Hurtado
- (Colombia) Juan Camilo Aguirre
- (Costa Rica) Anllel Porras Conejo

Deportivo Marquense

- (Uruguay) Gerardo Putten
- (Colombia) Juan Osorio Tobón
- (Uruguay) Danilo Suarez
- (Uruguay) Jonathan Piñeiro Correa

(player released during the Apertura season) (player released between the Apertura and Clausura seasons) (player released during the Clausura season)

CSD Municipal

- (Panama) Blas Perez
- (Uruguay) Gastón Puerari
- (El Salvador) Jaime Alas
- (Panama) Felipe Baloy

Deportivo Petapa

- (Costa Rica) Víctor Bolivar
- (Brazil) Janderson Pereira
- (Brazil) Juliano Rangel
- (Jamaica) Francois Swaby
- (Colombia) Hugo Acosta
- (Uruguay) Rodrigo Cubilla

Sanarate

- (Argentina) Juan Lovato
- (Colombia) William Zapata

Siquinalá

- (Honduras) Quiarol Arzu
- (Mexico) Cesar García
- (Costa Rica) Verny Scott
- (Costa Rica) Diego Sanchez Corrales
- (Argentina) Pablo Mingorance

CD Suchitepéquez

- (El Salvador) Kevin Santamaria
- (Colombia) Jesus Lozano
- (Brazil) Ze Paulo
- (Mexico) Othoniel Jaramillo

Club Xelajú MC

- (Bolivia) Vladimir Castellon
- (Mexico) Juan Carlos Silva
- (Honduras) Juan Yax
- (Mexico) Brayan Adan Martinez

== Aggregate table ==
| Pos | Team | Pld | W | D | L | GF | GA | GD | Pts | Qualification or relegation |
|---|---|---|---|---|---|---|---|---|---|---|
| 1 | Antigua | 44 | 22 | 9 | 13 | 77 | 50 | +27 | 75 | |
| 2 | Cobán Imperial | 44 | 21 | 11 | 12 | 60 | 46 | +14 | 74 | |
| 3 | Guastatoya | 44 | 20 | 12 | 12 | 60 | 39 | +21 | 72 | 2019 CONCACAF Champions League |
| 4 | Petapa | 44 | 20 | 7 | 17 | 62 | 52 | +10 | 67 | |
| 5 | Sanarate | 44 | 18 | 12 | 14 | 43 | 36 | +7 | 66 | |
| 6 | Xelajú | 44 | 19 | 9 | 16 | 61 | 58 | +3 | 66 | |
| 7 | Municipal | 44 | 17 | 12 | 15 | 58 | 46 | +12 | 63 | |
| 8 | Comunicaciones | 44 | 17 | 12 | 15 | 50 | 46 | +4 | 63 | |
| 9 | Malacateco | 44 | 14 | 9 | 21 | 54 | 61 | −7 | 51 | |
| 10 | Siquinalá | 44 | 14 | 9 | 21 | 39 | 60 | −21 | 51 | |
| 11 | Suchitepéquez | 44 | 13 | 8 | 23 | 53 | 79 | −26 | 47 | Relegation to 2017-2018 Primera División de Ascenso |
| 12 | Marquense | 44 | 9 | 10 | 25 | 34 | 78 | −44 | 37 | Relegation to 2017-2018 Primera División de Ascenso |

Updated to match(es) played on May 7, 2018. Source:
Rules for classification: 1) points; 2) goal difference; 3) number of goals scored.

== CONCACAF Champions League playoff ==
After the suspension of the National Football Federation of Guatemala was lifted by FIFA in June 2018, it was decided that the representative of Guatemala in the 2019 CONCACAF Champions League would be decided by a two-legged playoff between the 2017 Apertura champions (Antigua GFC) and the 2018 Clausura champions (Guastatoya). The draw for the order of legs was held on 27 June 2018.

8 August 2018
15:30

| Antigua GFC | 0–1 | Guastatoya |
|---|---|---|
| | | Rodríguez 85' |

Estadio Pensativo, Antigua
22 August 2018
14:30

| Guastatoya | 0–0 | Antigua GFC |

Estadio David Cordón Hichos, Guastatoya
