= Juan Carlos Meza =

Mexican footballer (born 1985)

Personal information
- Full name: Juan Carlos Meza Gutiérrez
- Date of birth: 20 April 1985 (age 41)
- Place of birth: Ecatepec, State of Mexico, Mexico
- Height: 1.89 m (6 ft 2 in)
- Position: Defender

Team information
- Current team: Sololá
- Number: 2

Senior career*
| Years | Team | Apps | (Gls) |
| 2004–2005 | BUAP | 17 | (0) |
| 2005–2011 | UAT | 82 | (1) |
| 2007 | → Sinaloa (loan) | 0 | (0) |
| 2012 | Celaya | 7 | (1) |
| 2014–2017 | Malacateco | 32 | (3) |
| 2014 | → Chorillo (loan) | 2 | (1) |
| 2017–2018 | Sanarate | 2 | (0) |
| 2019 | Chiantla | 38 | (1) |
| 2021– | Sololá | 11 | (0) |
- * Club domestic league appearances and goals

Juan Carlos Meza Gutiérrez (born 20 April 1985) is a Mexican professional footballer.
