= Cristian Jiménez =

Cristian Jiménez may refer to:

- Cristian Jiménez (footballer, born 1995)
- Cristian Jiménez (footballer, born 2002)
