= Rotondi (surname) =

Rotondi is an Italian surname. Notable people with the surname include:

- Carlos Rotondi (born 1997), Argentine footballer
- Gianfranco Rotondi (born 1960), Italian politician
- Jim Rotondi (born 1962), American jazz trumpeter
- Matías Rotondi (born 1992), Argentine footballer
- Samuel Rotondi (born 1946), American lawyer and politician
