= José Franco (footballer, born 2001) =

Guatemalan footballer (born 2001)

Personal information
- Full name: José Daniel Franco Aldana
- Date of birth: 17 October 2001 (age 25)
- Place of birth: Río Hondo, Guatemala
- Height: 1.84 m (6 ft 0 in)
- Position: Forward

Team information
- Current team: Antigua

Senior career*
Years	Team	Apps	(Gls)
2020–2022	Municipal	29	(1)
2022–2023	Mixco	21	(4)
2023–2025	Antigua	6	(0)
2024	→ Oaxaca (loan)	27	(6)
2025	→ Malacateco (loan)	4	(3)
2026	Oaxaca	0	(0)
2026–	Antigua	0	(0)

International career^{‡}
2023–	Guatemala	2	(0)
- * Club domestic league appearances and goals as of 20:00, 16 August 2025 (UTC) ‡ National team caps and goals as of 20:00, 27 July 2024 (UTC)

José Daniel Franco Aldana (born 17 October 2001) is a Guatemalan professional footballer who plays as a forward for Liga Bantrab club Antigua and the Guatemala national team.

== Club career ==
=== Municipal ===
Franco began his professional football career in Liga Nacional club Municipal. Franco tallied one goal in 29 appearances across all competitions for Municipal.

=== Mixco ===
Franco signed with Mixco ahead of the 2022–23 Liga Nacional de Guatemala Clausura in 2022. He would make his debut on 1 March 2023 in a 3–0 defeat against Guastatoya.

=== Antigua ===
After one season with Mixco, Franco joined Antigua. He would make his debut on 26 September 2023.

== International career ==
On 7 June 2023, Franco made his senior debut in a friendly match against Mexico in a 2–0 defeat. In 2024, Franco would make his second appearance for Guatemala in a friendly match against El Salvador in a 1–0 defeat.
