= Cristian Jiménez (footballer, born 1995) =

Guatemalan footballer

Personal information
- Full name: Cristian Alexander Jiménez Martínez
- Date of birth: April 26, 1995 (age 31)
- Place of birth: Guatemala City, Guatemala
- Height: 1.74 m (5 ft 8 1/2 in)
- Position: Right-back

Team information
- Current team: Municipal

Senior career*
Years	Team	Apps	(Gls)
2013–2018	Municipal	171	(17)
2018–2023	Antigua	209	(13)
2024-	Municipal	17	(2)

International career^{‡}
2010–2011	Guatemala U17	6	(0)
2012–2015	Guatemala U20	12	(1)
2016–	Guatemala	15	(0)
- * Club domestic league appearances and goals as of 8 February 2021 (UTC) ‡ National team caps and goals as of 27 March 2023 (UTC)

Cristian Alexander Jiménez Martínez (born April 26, 1995) is a Guatemalan professional footballer who plays as a right-back for Liga Nacional club Municipal and the Guatemala national team.

== International career ==
Jiménez received his first call up to the Guatemala senior squad in February 2016, to play a friendly against Honduras. During a 2018 FIFA World Cup qualifying game against Trinidad and Tobago, he was sent off in the 84th minute for dragging back forward Joevin Jones.

National team	Year	Apps	Goals
Guatemala	2016	7	0
Guatemala	2017	0	0
Total		8	0

== Honours ==
Municipal

- Liga Nacional de Guatemala: Clausura 2017, Clausura 2024

Antigua

- Liga Nacional de Guatemala: Clausura 2019
