= Wilson Godoy =

Guatemalan footballer

Personal information
- Full name: Wilson Ariel Godoy Gudiel
- Date of birth: 6 September 1987 (age 39)
- Place of birth: Guatemala City, Guatemala
- Height: 1.75 m (5 ft 9 in)
- Position: Centre-back

Senior career*
Years	Team	Apps	(Gls)
2010–2012	Aurora		
2012–2016	Halcones	29	(1)
2016–2017	Malacateco	25	(0)
2017–2020	Xelajú	59	(2)
2018–2019	→ Malacateco (loan)	38	(3)
2020–2025	Malacateco	116	(4)
2025	Achuapa	0	(0)
2026–	Iztapa	0	(0)
- * Club domestic league appearances and goals

Wilson Ariel Godoy Gudiel (Spanish pronunciation: [wˈilson aɾjˈel ɡoðˈo͡ɪ ɡuðjˈel]; born 6 September 1987), nicknamed El Tucán ("The Toucan"), is a Guatemalan professional footballer who plays as a centre-back for Liga Primera División club Iztapa.

== Club career ==
=== Halcones ===
On 4 June 2012, Halcones confirmed the official signing of Godoy.

=== Xelajú ===
On 20 May 2017, Godoy was presented as a new signing of Xelajú.

==== 2018–19: Loan to Malacateco ====
On 31 May 2018, Malacateco announced that they had acquired Godoy on loan.

==== 2019–20: Return to Xelajú and departure ====
On 3 June 2019, Xelajú announced the return of Godoy from loan.

=== Return to Malacateco ===
On 11 June 2020, it was announced that Godoy would once again return to Malacateco.

On 14 May 2025, it was confirmed that Godoy had departed from the club.

== Honours ==
- Liga Nacional: 2021 Apertura
