= Matías Rotondi =

Argentine footballer (born 1992)

Personal information
- Full name: Eduardo Matías Rotondi
- Date of birth: 29 January 1992 (age 34)
- Place of birth: Puerto Iguazú, Argentina
- Height: 1.73 m (5 ft 8 in)
- Position: Centre-forward

Team information
- Current team: Bartolomé Mitre

Senior career*
Years	Team	Apps	(Gls)
2010–2012	Argentinos Juniors		
2012–2014	Temperley		
2014–2016	Bragado		
2016–2018	Argentino de Rosario		
2018–2019	O&M		
2019	Orense		
2019–2020	O&M		
2020–2021	Cibao	3	(0)
2021	Honduras Progreso	14	(6)
2021–2022	Malacateco	21	(15)
2022–2025	Municipal	108	(51)
2025	Real España	12	(2)
2025–2026	Cobán Imperial	10	(0)
2026–	Bartolomé Mitre	0	(0)
- * Club domestic league appearances and goals

Eduardo Matías Rotondi (born 29 January 1992) is an Argentine professional footballer who plays as a forward for Torneo Federal A club Bartolomé Mitre.

== Club career ==
He signed with Honduran club Honduras Progreso in February 2021.

=== Malacateco ===
In July 2021, he signed with Liga Nacional club Malacateco. He helped the team win their first-ever league title.

=== Municipal ===
In January 2022, he left Malacateco to join fellow rivals Municipal. In the first leg of the final on 26 May, Rotondi started in a 1–0 loss against Comunicaciones. The next day, it was announced that Rotondi and Stheven Robles would not play in the second leg due to making obscene gestures, and would be fined Q500.

== Honours ==
Malacateco

- Liga Guate: Apertura 2021

Municipal

- Liga Guate: Clausura 2024

Individual

- Juan Carlos Plata Trophy: Apertura 2021
