= Luis Omar Hernández =

Mexican footballer (born 1985)

Personal information
- Full name: Luis Omar Hernández Hernández
- Date of birth: 8 November 1985 (age 41)
- Place of birth: Guadalajara, Jalisco, Mexico
- Height: 1.86 m (6 ft 1 in)
- Position: Defender

Senior career*
Years	Team	Apps	(Gls)
2003–2004	Mérida	?	(?)
2005–2013	Necaxa	112	(4)
2010–2011	→ San Luis (loan)	26	(1)
2013–2014	→ Lobos BUAP (loan)	3	(0)
2015–2017	Herediano	45	(1)
2017	Necaxa	0	(0)
2018	Deportivo Chiantla	4	(0)

International career
2006–2008	Mexico U-23	2	(0)
- * Club domestic league appearances and goals as of 17 February 2019

Luis Omar Hernández Hernández (born 8 November 1985 in Guadalajara, Jalisco) is a Mexican former professional footballer who last played for Deportivo Chiantla as a defender. He made his debut on 30 July 2005 in a match against Toluca, a game which resulted in a 0–0 tie for Necaxa. After obtaining the championship with Necaxa in the Mexico Liga de Ascenso (2nd tier league), Hernandez was placed on the transferable list and was loaned out to San Luis F.C. for the upcoming Torneo Apertura 2010 in Mexico.

== Honours ==
=== Club ===
Necaxa

- Copa MX: Clausura 2018
