= Jeff Korytoski =

American professional soccer coach (born 1977)

Jeffrey Korytoski
Personal information
- Date of birth: 1977 (age 48–49)
- Place of birth: Springfield, Massachusetts, United States

Managerial career
- Years: Team
- 2007: Northern Mariana Islands
- 2008–2010: Cal Poly Mustangs (assistant)
- 2010–2011: Antigua GFC
- 2012: Harvard Crimson (assistant)
- 2012–2013: Hawaii–Hilo Vulcans
- 2013: Antigua GFC
- 2013–2014: Deportivo Coatepeque
- 2015–2016: San Diego State Aztecs (assistant)
- 2016–2020: ASC San Diego
- 2020–2021: Antigua GFC
- 2022: Albion San Diego
- 2023: Chattanooga Red Wolves

Jeffrey "Ziggy" Korytoski (born 1977) is an American professional soccer coach.

== Career ==
Korytoski is currently the Sporting Director and Head Coach for ALBION San Diego. Prior to his time in charge he was the Director Tecnico (Head Coach) for Antigua GFC in Guatemala's Liga Nacional.

His teams are noted for being possession-oriented in the build up, dynamic in the final third and organised defensively. Korytoski holds both his UEFA A and USSF A Licenses.

Korytoski began his international coaching career in 2007 when he was hired to coach the Northern Mariana Islands National Football Team. Coming off a successful stint at them helm of the CNMI, he was next hired as an assistant to Paul Holocher at Cal Poly – San Luis Obispo, as part of the staff that beat UCLA in the 2009 NCAA tournament. Following his time in Saipan, Korytoski was then named the head coach of Antigua GFC in June 2010. While in Antigua, Korytoski helped guide the team to promotion during his first year in the top division. and a semi-final appearance in year two (2). Korytoski returned home to assist at Harvard University in the fall before being named the head coach of the University of Hawai'i at Hilo. Following a brief return to Antigua GFC which concluded with his battle to avoid relegation in 2013, Korytoski was hired at Deportivo Coatepeque.

In 2016 Ziggy coached the Albion SC Pros and led them to an undefeated record at 8–0–4 in league play. In 2019, Korytoski capped off his time in San Diego by leading ASC San Diego to the National Semi-final dropping the tie to the New York Cosmos.

In 2020, Korytoski returned to direct the Antigua GFC Youth Academy before being promoted to head coach of the first-team following the dismissal of Juan Antonio Torres. It was during this time that Antigua GFC qualified for the post-season after moving from 10th in the table to 7th and upset perennial contender Comunicaciones 3-0 and solidified their spot in the Semi-final for the first time in four tournament appearances. Antigua GFC eventually drew with Municipal 1–1 on aggregate after conceding a goal in the 89th minute of the second leg. They were received by 3,000 Antiguenos in the street upon their return home and have not reach the semi's since Korytoski's departure.

On December 14, 2022, Korytoski was hired as head coach for USL League One side Chattanooga Red Wolves.
