= Abraham Alpuche =

Mexican footballer (born 1987)

Personal information
- Full name: José Abraham Alpuche De León
- Date of birth: 25 November 1987 (age 38)
- Place of birth: Minatitlán, Veracruz, Mexico
- Height: 1.73 m (5 ft 8 in)
- Position: Attacking midfielder

Team information
- Current team: Deportivo Chiantla
- Number: 5

Youth career
- 2007–2008: Galeana Morelos

Senior career*
Years	Team	Apps	(Gls)
2008–2010	Albinegros de Orizaba	36	(0)
2010	Inter Playa del Carmen	11	(0)
2010–2012	Deportivo Guamuchil	13	(3)
2013–2014	Ulisses FC	26	(3)
2014–2015	Gandzasar Kapan	5	(0)
2016–2017	Deportivo Carchá	35	(6)
2017–2018	Murciélagos F.C.	19	(1)
2018-	Deportivo Chiantla	14	(1)
- * Club domestic league appearances and goals as of August 17, 2020

José Abraham Alpuche De León (born 25 November 1987) is a Mexican footballer who plays as a midfielder for Deportivo Chiantla.
