= Víctor Bolívar =

Costa Rican footballer (born 1983)

Personal information
- Full name: Víctor Andrey Bolívar Ordóñez
- Date of birth: 30 September 1983 (age 43)
- Height: 1.79 m (5 ft 10 1/2 in)
- Position: Goalkeeper

Team information
- Current team: Sololá
- Number: 1

Youth career
- Deportivo Saprissa

Senior career*
Years	Team	Apps	(Gls)
2003–2007	Municipal Liberia	41	(0)
2007–2008	Brujas	2	(0)
2010–2011	Barrio Mexico	14	(0)
2011	→ Saprissa (loan)	11	(0)
2011–2012	Saprissa	42	(0)
2013	Santos de Guápiles	20	(0)
2013–2014	→ Puntarenas (loan)	43	(0)
2014	Herediano	0	(0)
2015	UCR	5	(0)
2015–2016	Carmelita	41	(0)
2016–2017	Antigua	39	(0)
2017–2018	Petapa	44	(0)
2018	Malacateco	23	(0)
2019	Sanarate	15	(0)
2019	Municipal Grecia	8	(0)
2020	Quiché		(0)
2020-2021	Municipal Grecia	3	(0)
2021-	Sololá	30	(0)

International career
2010	Costa Rica	1	(0)
- * Club domestic league appearances and goals as of 21:55, 22 September 2019 (UTC)

Víctor Andrey Bolívar Ordóñez (born September 30, 1983) is a Costa Rican professional footballer who currently plays as a goalkeeper for Liga Nacional club Sololá.

== Club career ==
Bolívar played for several clubs in Cosra Rica, most notably Municipal Liberia and Saprissa. He announced his retirement in May 2013 when with Santos de Guápiles, whom he joined in January 2013, but returned to the game when he joined Puntarenas on loan from Santos in August 2013.

In May 2014, Bolívar was snapped up by Herediano, only to leave them for Universidad in December 2014.

In December 2019, Bolívar joined Quiché FC in Guatemala.

== International career ==
He earned his first international cap in a 2–1 victory against El Salvador on October 12, 2010, following a strong season with his club, Club Deportivo Barrio Mexico.

== Personal life ==
Bolívar is married to model Alejandra Rodríguez and they have a son, Iker Andrey.
