= Cervecería Centro Americana =

Brewery in Guatemala City, Guatemala

Cervecería Centro Americana S.A.
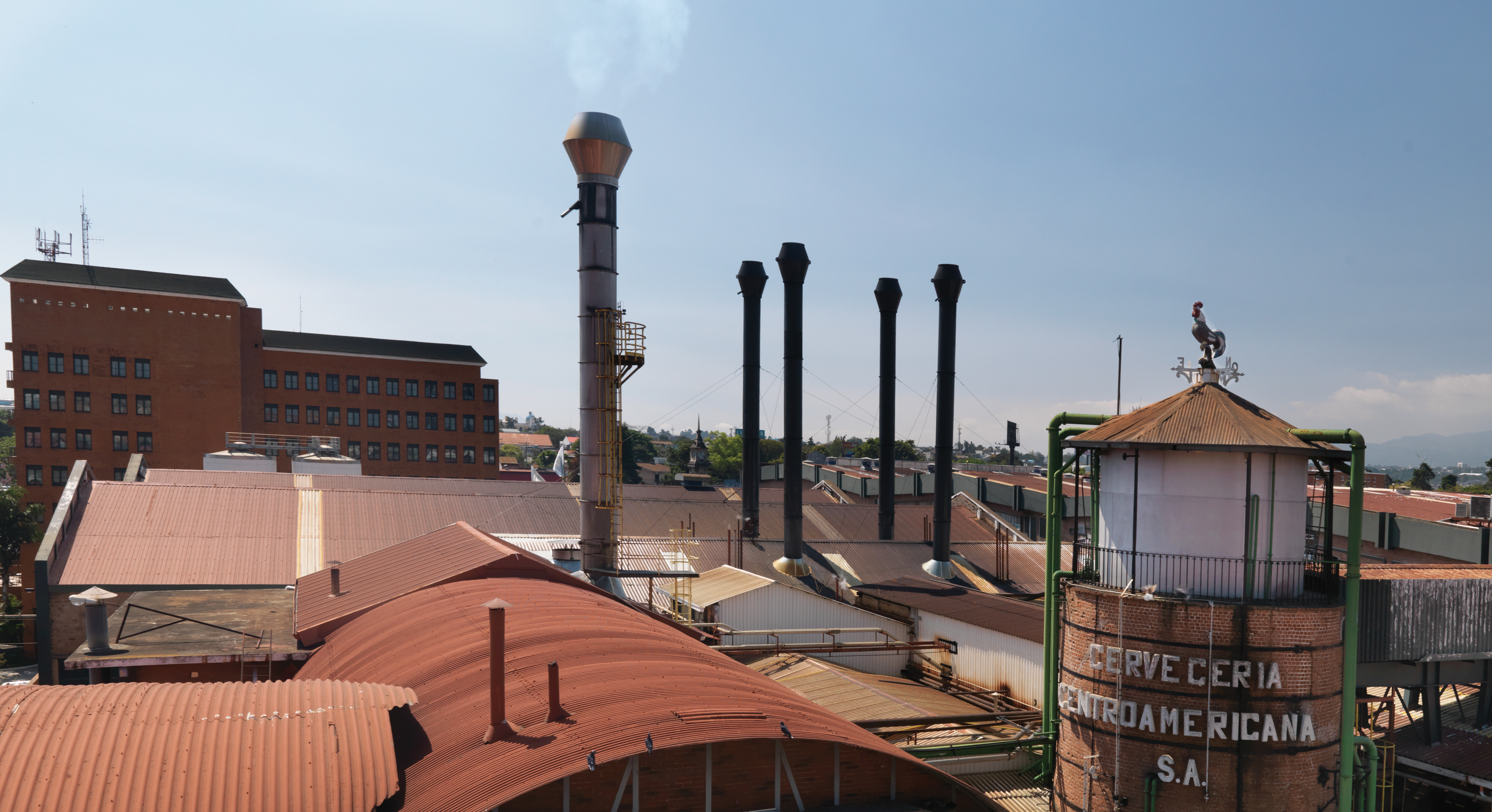
- Company type: public
- Industry: beverages
- Founded: February 3, 1896
- Headquarters: Guatemala City, Guatemala
- Products: beer
- Website: Cervececeriacentroamericana.com

Cervecería Centro Americana Sociedad Anónima is a Guatemalan brewery based in Guatemala City, Guatemala. It was founded by Mariano Castillo Córdova and his brother, Rafael Castillo Córdova.

== Products ==
=== Gallo ===
Gallo is a 5% abv pale lager. It is Guatemala's oldest continually produced beer, dating back to 1896.

Gallo is sold in 350 mL (12 U.S. fl oz; 12 imp fl oz) aluminum cans, 355 mL (12.0 U.S. fl oz; 12.5 imp fl oz) returnable bottles, 355 mL non-returnable bottles, and 1-liter (34 U.S. fl oz; 35 imp fl oz) returnable bottles. In recent years Gallo has been exported to other Central American countries, Mexico, France and the United States. The beer is sold under the name Famosa ("Famous") in France and the US. The label's design features a cockerel (Spanish: gallo).

Gallo has received several international certifications, including the gold medal certification "Monde Selection" from Belgium, in recognition for its outstanding quality. The brewery also claims to have received the "Prestige Award" and also claims to be the only two breweries in the Americas to have received it.

=== Gallo Light ===
Gallo Light is a light beer, the first and only one in the Guatemalan market, with low calories and a 4.2% alcohol content.

=== Victoria ===
Victoria is a pale lager with a 5% alcohol content by volume.

Victoria was launched, in a 12-U.S.-fluid-ounce (355 mL; 12.5 imp fl oz) canned format, in the western part of Guatemala in 1996. It proved successful, and expansion into the rest of the nation's territory began shortly afterwards.

=== Other products ===
Chopp Gallo, Cabro, Dorada Ice, Dorada Draft, Monte Carlo, Moza, Malta, Rio and Rio Light
