= Gustavo Bobadilla =

Paraguayan football coach (born 1959)

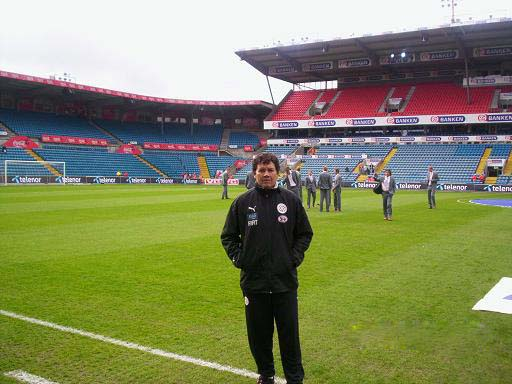

Personal information
- Full name: Gustavo Adolfo Bobadilla Orrego
- Date of birth: 17 February 1959 (age 67)
- Place of birth: Asunción, Paraguay
- Position: Goalkeeper

Team information
- Current team: Sol de América (manager)

Senior career*
Years	Team	Apps	(Gls)
- General Genes
1979–1982	Olimpia		
1984	Sol de América		
1985–1988	Olimpia		
1988–1990	Colegiales		
1991	Deportivo Municipal		
1991–1992	Sportivo Luqueño		
1993	Melgar		

Managerial career
- 1995: Guaraní (assistant)
- 1996: Sportivo Luqueño (assistant)
- 1997–1998: Sol de América
- 1999: Paraguay (assistant)
- 2000: Olimpia (youth)
- 2000: Tacuary
- 2001–2002: Paraguay (assistant)
- 2003: Deportivo Recoleta
- 2004: Paraguay U20 (assistant)
- 2005–2006: Olimpia (assistant)
- 2008: Melgar
- 2011–2012: Guatemala U20
- 2013: Olimpia (assistant)
- 2014: 25 de Noviembre
- 2014: Resistencia
- 2015: Independiente FBC
- 2015: Deportivo Santaní (assistant)
- 2016–2017: 22 de Setiembre
- 2017: River Plate Asunción
- 2017: Municipal (assistant)
- 2018: 25 de Noviembre
- 2018–2019: General Caballero JLM
- 2021: Sol de América (assistant)
- 2021: 2 de Mayo
- 2022: General Caballero JLM
- 2023–: Sol de América
- * Club domestic league appearances and goals

Gustavo Adolfo Bobadilla Orrego (born 17 February 1959) is a Paraguayan football coach and former player who played as a goalkeeper. He is the current manager of Sol de América.

== Playing career ==
Born in Paraguay, Bobadilla started his career at Olimpia Asunción where he played for 12 years mostly as a substitute to the star of Ever Hugo Almeida. While in Olimpia, he won several national championships between 1979 and 1988. He then went on to play for Atlético Colegiales and Sportivo Luqueño before going to Peru to play for teams like Club Deportivo Municipal and FBC Melgar. He also had a brief stint in Club Sol de América in 1984.

While playing in Peru, Bobadilla sported the emblem of Sportivo Luqueño in his jerseys to show the love for the team and the city of Luque.

== Coaching career ==
Bobadilla managed the youth divisions of teams like Olimpia, Sol de América, Guaraní and the Paraguay national team. In Peru, he coached Melgar FBC. and in the second division of Paraguay, the teams of Resistencia and Independiente de Campo Grande.
