= CSD Nueva Concepción =

Association football club in Guatemala

Deportivo Nueva Concepción
- Full name: Club Social y Deportivo Nueva Concepción
- Nicknames: Los Toros (The Bulls); Los Potros (The Colts); Los Ganaderos (The Cattle Ranchers); Los Trocheros (The Trocheros)
- Short name: Nueva
- Founded: July 1, 1994; 31 years ago
- Ground: Estadio Jose Luis Ibarra
- Capacity: 3,000
- Chairman: Ezequiel Orellana
- Manager: Adrián Barrios
- League: Primera Division
- Clausura 2024: Group A 8th

Club Social y Deportivo Nueva Concepción, is a Guatemalan professional football club based in Nueva Concepción, Escuintla Department. They compete in the Liga Primera División, the second tier of Guatemalan football.

They play their home games in the Estadio Jose Luis Ibarra.

== History ==
They have been playing in the second tier of Guatemalan football since the 2001/2002 season. On May 15, 2021, they were promoted back to the top tier of Guatemalan football after beating Aurora 1–0 in extra time.

== Players ==
=== Current squad ===
Note: Flags indicate national team as defined under FIFA eligibility rules; some limited exceptions apply. Players may hold more than one non-FIFA nationality.

No.	Pos.	Nation	Player
1	GK	GUA	Ricardo Méndez
2	DF	GUA	Antony Fernández
3	DF	GUA	Marvin Rivera
5	MF	GUA	Brandon Soto
6	MF	GUA	Junior Hernández
7	FW	GUA	Gustavo Amado
9	FW	ARG	Bruno Mariani
10	MF	ARG	Leandro Marini
11	MF	GUA	Anderson Molina
12	DF	GUA	Jonathan Orellana
14	MF	GUA	Marlon Xinic
17	MF	GUA	Juan Sacú
20	DF	BRA	Aelcio dos Santos

No.	Pos.	Nation	Player
21	DF	GUA	Julio Rosal
22	MF	GUA	Amilcar Carrillo
23	DF	COL	Jhon Balanta
25	DF	COL	Jonathan Muñoz (captain)
28	DF	GUA	Jorge Tucuru
29	DF	GUA	Iván Estrada
30	MF	GUA	Kevin Norales
37	GK	GUA	Brandon Dávila
55	DF	GUA	Hervin Sagastume
57	DF	GUA	Josue Escobar
77	MF	GUA	Josué Jucup
79	MF	GUA	Jose Garcia
99	DF	GUA	Elder Orantes
