= CD Chiantla =

Association football club in Guatemala

Chiantla
- Full name: Club Deportivo Chiantla
- Nickname: Los Tigres (The Tigers)
- Founded: 1980
- Ground: Estadio Buenos Aires
- Capacity: 2,000
- Manager: (Guatemala) Juan Salguero
- League: Segunda División de Ascenso
- Website: https://m.facebook.com/ClubDeportivoChiantla/
Home colours	Away colours

Club Deportivo Chiantla is a Guatemalan professional football club from Chiantla, Huehuetenango Department. It was founded on 1980. It currently plays in the Segunda División de Ascenso, the third tier of Guatemalan football.

== History ==
The team began playing at amateur leagues having a great progress gaining more supporters and sponsors. In 1992 it achieved the professional status after being promoted to Liga mayor B today known as the second tier Primera División de Ascenso. In the 2017/18 they gained promotion to the Liga Nacional de Fútbol de Guatemala for the first time ever.

== Players ==
=== Current squad ===
Note: Flags indicate national team as defined under FIFA eligibility rules; some limited exceptions apply. Players may hold more than one non-FIFA nationality.

No.	Pos.	Nation	Player
—	GK	GUA	Byron Ramos
—	GK	GUA	Óscar Ramírez
—	GK	MEX	Liborio Sánchez
—	DF	GUA	Heberson Velásquez
—	DF	GUA	Valerio Morales
—	DF	MEX	Juan Carlos Meza
—	DF	MEX	Luis Omar Hernández
—	MF	GUA	Osmar Morales
—	MF	MEX	José Abraham Alpuche
—	MF	GUA	Franklin Barrios
—	MF	GUA	Antony López
—	MF	GUA	Julio Mérida

No.	Pos.	Nation	Player
—	MF	GUA	Emerson Martínez
—	MF	GUA	Bainer Barrios
—	MF	GUA	Christian Solares
—	MF	GUA	Hugo Gonzáles
—	MF	GUA	Diego Orozco
—	FW	ESA	Edgardo Mira
—	FW	MEX	Sergio Blancas
—	FW	GUA	Mario Mazariegos
—	FW	GUA	Delvin Granados
—	FW	GUA	Pablo Barros
—	FW	GUA	Edvin Juárez

== List of coaches ==
- (Guatemala) Elvis Tello Alvarado (2010)
- (Guatemala) Julio César Englenton Chuga (Dec 2015 - )
- (Guatemala) Marvin Hernández (Aug 2017 - August 2018)
- (Guatemala) Alberto Salguero (Sept 2018-)
