= CD Naranjeros Escuintla =

Association football club in Guatemala

Naranjeros Escuintla
- Full name: Club Deportivo Naranjeros Escuintla
- Nickname: Los Naranjeros (The Orange Growers)
- Founded: 2004; 22 years ago (as Deportivo Siquinalá)
- Ground: Estadio Armando Barillas
- Capacity: 10,000
- Manager: Otto Rodriguez
- League: Segunda División de Ascenso
- 2021 Clausura: Primera División de Ascenso, Group C (4th)
- Website: https://es-la.facebook.com/deportivo.siquinala/
Home colours	Away colours

Club Deportivo Naranjeros Escuintla is a Guatemalan professional football club from Escuintla. It was founded in 2004 and competes in the Segunda División de Ascenso, the third tier of Guatemalan football.

== Players ==
=== Current squad ===
As of 28 June 2020

Note: Flags indicate national team as defined under FIFA eligibility rules; some limited exceptions apply. Players may hold more than one non-FIFA nationality.

No.	Pos.	Nation	Player
1	GK	GUA	Ricardo Méndez
2	DF	GUA	Carlos Morales
3	MF	KOR	Sun You-Kin
4	MF	GUA	Luis Estrada
5	MF	GUA	Sergio Jucup
7	MF	GUA	Ederick Ardón
8	MF	GUA	José Morales
9	FW	GUA	Héctor Morales
11	FW	CRC	Jairo Arrieta
14	MF	GUA	Grimaldo Berrios
15	MF	GUA	Luis Juárez
17	MF	GUA	Jose Del Águila
19	MF	GUA	Marvin Ávila
20	DF	URU	Wilinton Techera
21	FW	GUA	Luis Rosas

No.	Pos.	Nation	Player
22	DF	GUA	Denilson Hernández
23	GK	GUA	Jonathan Reyes
24	MF	GUA	Ricardo Méndez
26	DF	GUA	Bryan Lemus
27	GK	GUA	Iván Pacheco
28	FW	USA	Jose Ortega
30	GK	GUA	Kevin Moscoso
32	MF	ESA	José Tobar
37	MF	GUA	Kenneth Ramirez
55	MF	GUA	Jorge Reyes
57	MF	GUA	Dany Reyes
66	MF	GUA	Pedro Conguache
87	FW	GUA	Osmar López
88	MF	GUA	Ronald Escobar
89	MF	GUA	Miguel Fuentes
96	MF	GUA	Wilder Castellanos

== List of coaches ==
- (Guatemala) Kenny Colindres (June 2016 – May 2017)
- (Guatemala) César Balcárce (June 2017 – Aug 2017)
- (Guatemala) Jairo Pérez (Aug 2017 – Dec 2017)
- (Argentina) Daniel Berta (Dec 2017 – Oct 2018)
- (Guatemala) Otto Rodríguez (Oct 2018 – present)
