= Antigua GFC =

Association football club in Guatemala

Antigua
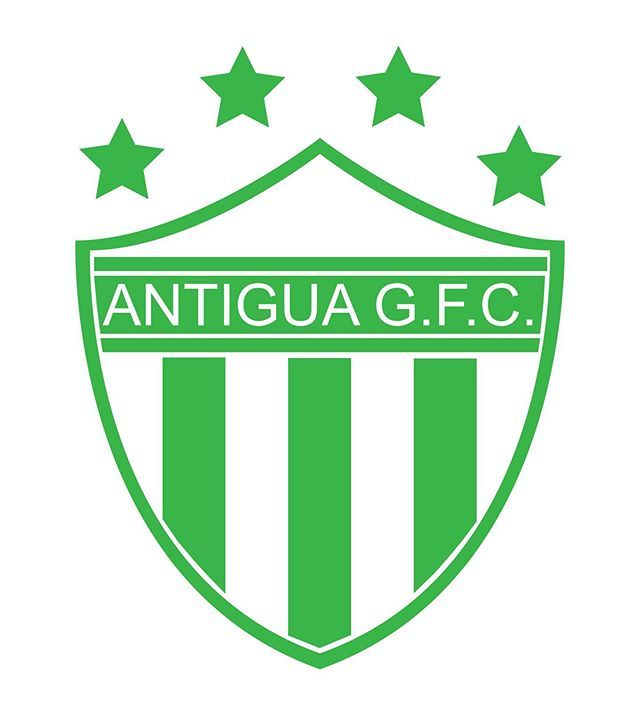
- Full name: Antigua Guatemala Fútbol Club
- Nicknames: Coloniales (Colonials); Los Panzas Verdes (The Green Bellies); Los Aguacateros (The Avocado Producers)
- Founded: 1958; 68 years ago
- Ground: Estadio Pensativo
- Capacity: 10,000
- Chairman: Víctor Hugo García
- Manager: Javier López
- League: Liga Guate
- Apertura 2024: 7th (Semifinals)
- Website: www.antiguagfc.com
| Home colours | Away colours |

Antigua Guatemala Fútbol Club (Spanish pronunciation: [anˈtiɣwa ɣwateˈmala ˈfuðβol ˈkluβ]), is a Guatemalan professional football team based in Antigua Guatemala. They compete in the Liga Bantrab, the top tier of Guatemalan football.

They play their home games at the Estadio Pensativo. They are nicknamed Los Panzas Verdes (The Green Bellies) in reference to the local avocados grown in the city and as represented by the green stripes on the team uniform.

== History ==
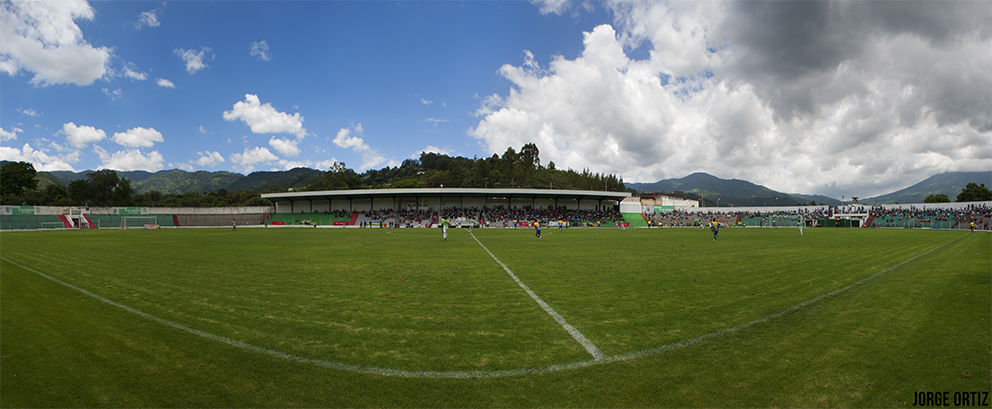
Pensativo Stadium

The club was founded in 1958 by Dr. Miguel Ángel Soto Bustamante and Mr. Antonio Martínez Barrios with the colonial city as its home. The club's first president was Rogelio Toledo Estrada and the club's first manager was César Rodríguez Gudiel.

After earning promotion to the maximum division (Liga Mayor "A") in the 1957–58 season, Antigua finished third in the 1959–60 league table. However, they could not retain their level in the following years, suffering relegation after the 1964 season. After more than a decade in the Liga Mayor B, the club's administration was inherited by the Antigua Guatemala Municipality, and in December 1976, earned promotion back to the Liga Mayor "A", but were relegated two years later as the number of teams in the league was reduced from 18 to 12. Administration changed hands again and the team earned another promotion in 1979 after winning a tie-breaking third playoff match against Juca at the Estadio Mateo Flores, remaining in the top category until 1983, when a last-place finish on the standings relegated them once again.

Relegation in 1983 marked the beginning of a 16-year-long period in which the club went through financial strain and was unable to return to the top flight. In 1998 the team's administration was again given to the Municipality, and on 22 May 1999 they earned a spot in the now called Liga Nacional. In 2006 they were relegated after seven years in the top flight, in what had been their longest period of participation at the top level. As of 2011, they have competed in the Primera División de Ascenso.

=== Return to Liga Nacional in 2014 ===
Antigua compete in Guatemala's highest-level league having purchased the position offered by the Heredia Jaguares from Izabal. For the 2015 season, the club kit will be supplied by Italian sports company Diadora.

=== Championship ===
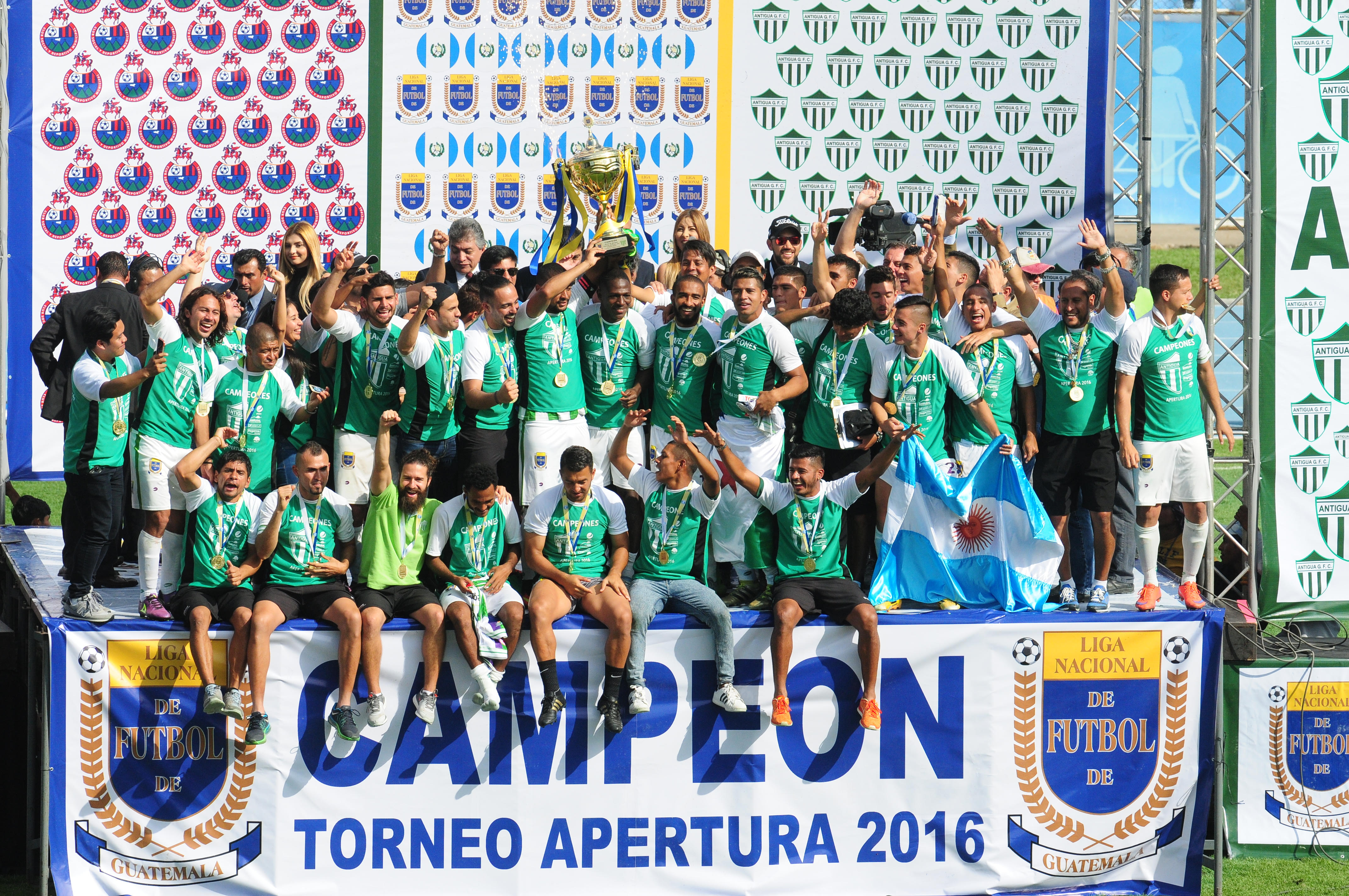
Antigua celebrating the 2016 Apertura title

On December 20, 2015, Antigua won the Apertura for the first time. Since their first victory, they were champions of Guatemalan football for three consecutive years. In 2019, Antigua won its fourth Guatemalan League title.

== Rivalries ==
Antigua main rivals are Mixco, known as the “Clasico del Valle.” They also rival fiercely with Comunicaciones known as the El Clásico Provincial and share rivalries with Guastatoya and Xelajú. This is given to the fact that they compete fiercely during their meetings in the Apertura and Clausura playoffs.

== Honours ==
=== Domestic honours ===
==== Leagues ====
- Liga Guate
  - Champions (6): Apertura 2015, Apertura 2016, Apertura 2017, Clausura 2019, Clausura 2025, Apertura 2025

=== Friendly Tournaments ===
- Copa Santiago
  - Champions (1): 2023

== Performance in international competitions ==
- CONCACAF Champions League

2016–17 - Group Stage
2025 - Preliminary Round

- CONCACAF Central American Cup
  - 2024 - Semi-finals
  - 2025 - Finals

- CONCACAF League

2019 - Preliminary Round

- CONCACAF League

2020 - Round of 16

== Players ==
=== Current squad ===
As of 16 September 2026

Note: Flags indicate national team as defined under FIFA eligibility rules; some limited exceptions apply. Players may hold more than one non-FIFA nationality.

| No. | Pos. | Nation | Player |
|---|---|---|---|
| 4 | MF | GUA | Guillermo Carbonell |
| 5 | MF | GUA | Allan García |
| 6 | MF | GUA | José Rosales |
| 8 | MF | GUA | Santiago Garzaro |
| 9 | FW | ARG | Francisco Apaolaza |
| 10 | MF | COL | Camilo Mora |
| 11 | FW | COL | Juan Moreno |
| 12 | DF | GUA | José Ardón (captain) |
| 15 | FW | ARG | Agustín Maziero |
| 16 | DF | GUA | Alejandro González |
| 17 | MF | GUA | Óscar Castellanos |
| 19 | MF | GUA | José Espinoza |
| 20 | FW | GUA | Jhostin Colindres |
| 21 | DF | CRC | Alexander Robinson |

| No. | Pos. | Nation | Player |
|---|---|---|---|
| 22 | FW | GUA | José Franco |
| 23 | DF | GUA | José Gálvez |
| 24 | DF | CRC | Suhander Zúñiga |
| 25 | DF | GUA | Wálter Paz |
| 26 | MF | GUA | Diego Fernández |
| 27 | DF | GUA | Dilan Palencia |
| 31 | GK | GUA | Luis Morán |
| 33 | DF | GUA | Héctor Prillwitz |
| 34 | MF | HON | Kevin López |
| 54 | MF | GUA | Selvin Sagastume |
| 60 | MF | GUA | Jimmy Ruiz |
| 72 | GK | GUA | Jorge Moreno |
| 77 | MF | COL | Edgard Camargo |
| 81 | FW | GUA | William Fajardo |

=== Out on loan ===
Note: Flags indicate national team as defined under FIFA eligibility rules; some limited exceptions apply. Players may hold more than one non-FIFA nationality.

| No. | Pos. | Nation | Player |
|---|---|---|---|
| 7 | FW | PAN | Newton Williams (at Deportivo Saprissa) |
| 29 | FW | GUA | José Franco (at Malacateco) |

== Personnel ==
=== Coaching staff ===
As of June 2025

| Position | Staff |
|---|---|
| Coach | (Guatemala) TBD (*) |
| Assistant manager | (Guatemala) TBD (*) |
| Reserve manager | (Guatemala) TBD (*) |
| Goalkeeper Coach | (Guatemala) TBD (*) |
| Under 17 Manager | (Guatemala) TBD (*) |
| Under 15 Manager | (Guatemala) TBD (*) |
| Sporting director | (Guatemala) TBD (*) |
| Fitness Coach | (Guatemala) TBD (*) |
| Team Doctor | (Guatemala) TBD (*) |
| Fitness Coach | (Guatemala) TBD (*) |
| Physiotherapy | (Guatemala) TBD (*) |
| Utility | (Guatemala) TBD (*) |

== Managerial history ==
- (Guatemala) César Rodríguez (1958)
- (Brazil) Jorge Tupinambá (1992–1995)
- (Guatemala) Carlos Rosales (2000)
- (Costa Rica) Rodolfo Arias (2001)
- (Spain) Mario Reig (2001–2002)
- (Colombia) Ever González (2009)
- (Guatemala) Orlando Andrade (2009–2010)
- (Argentina) Daniel Orlando Berta (2010)
- (Argentina) Ricardo Carreño (2010)
- (United States) Jeff Korytoski (2010–2011)
- (United States) Jeff Korytoski (2013)
- (Guatemala) Gabriel Castillo (2014)
- (Argentina) Mauricio Tapia (2014–2018)
- (Mexico) Roberto Montoya (2019–2020)
- (Mexico) Juan Antonio Torres (2020)
- (United States) Jeff Korytoski (2020–2021)
- (Mexico) Roberto Montoya (2021–2022)
- (Argentina) Ramiro Cepeda (2022–2023)
- (Costa Rica) Rónald González (2023)
- (Guatemala) Dwight Pezzarossi (2023–2024)
- (Spain) Javier López (June 2024– December 2024)
- (Argentina) Mauricio Tapia (December 2024 - Present)
