= Sanarate FC =

Association football club in Guatemala

Sanarate
- Full name: Sanarate Fútbol Club
- Nicknames: Los Celestes (The Sky Blues); La Máquina Celeste (The Sky Blue Machine); Los Ayoteros (The Ayoteros)
- Founded: 1 October 1958; 68 years ago
- Ground: Estadio Municipal de Sanarate
- Capacity: 4,000
- Manager: Víctor Gómez
- League: Liga Segunda División
- Clausura 2023: Group B 9th (relegated)
- Website: https://es-la.facebook.com/Club-Social-y-Deportivo-Sanarate-FCP%C3%A1g-589312051111351/
Home colours	Away colours

Sanarate Fútbol Club is a Guatemalan professional football club from Sanarate, El Progreso Department. It was founded in 1958 and competes in the Liga Segunda División, the third tier of Guatemalan football.

== History ==
They were first promoted to the highest level in their history in 1959, one year after their foundation but were relegated three years later. Subsequently, they competed in lower divisions until they reached promotion to Segunda División de Ascenso in 1990.

== Players ==
Note: Flags indicate national team as defined under FIFA eligibility rules; some limited exceptions apply. Players may hold more than one non-FIFA nationality.

No.	Pos.	Nation	Player
1	GK	GUA	Bryan Mejía
4	DF	GUA	Kevin Palencia
8	MF	GUA	Nery Oliva
11	FW	GUA	Jorge Herrera
13	DF	GUA	Óscar Pinto
17	MF	GUA	Jonathan Alvarez
18	DF	GUA	Robinson Pineda
19	GK	GUA	Iván Pacheco
21	MF	GUA	Anderson Molina
24	MF	GUA	Luis Rodas
48	MF	GUA	Jonathan Móran

No.	Pos.	Nation	Player
66	MF	GUA	Carlos Santos
77	FW	GUA	Osmar López
91	MF	GUA	Juan Castańeda
—	DF	GUA	Kevin Chen
—	DF	BRA	Juliano Rangel
-	MF	ARG	Rodrigo Ligorria
-	DF	GUA	Ribix García
-	MF	GUA	Orlando Hernández
-	GK	GUA	Luis Lucero
-	GK	GUA	Jhonathan Reyes
-	MF	GUA	Carlos Barillas
-	DF	GUA	Jorge López
-	MF	GUA	Jhonatan Estrada
-	MF	CRC	Luis Mora

== List of coaches ==
- (Argentina) Bartolo Márquez
- (Uruguay) Ariel Mena (2006–2008)
- (Argentina) Héctor Julián Trujillo (–Oct 2017)
- (Argentina) Horacio Cordero (Oct 2017–Dec 2017)
- (Argentina) Pablo Centrone (Dec 2017–Oct 2018)
- (Argentina) Hector Julian Trujillo (Oct 2018–Feb 2019)
- (Uruguay) Ariel Sena (Feb 2019–2019)
- (Guatemala) Rafael Díaz Aitkenhead (2019–2020)
- (Guatemala) Gabriel Castillo (2020)
- (Argentina) Matías Tatangelo (2021)
- (Guatemala) Irvin Olivares (2021)
- (Argentina) Jorge Sumich (2021)
- (Guatemala) Víctor Gómez (2021–)
