= C.D. Malacateco =

Association football club in Guatemala

CD Malacateco
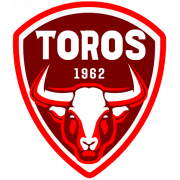
- Full name: Club Deportivo Malacateco
- Nickname: Los Toros (The Bulls)
- Founded: 8 September 1962; 63 years ago
- Ground: Estadio Santa Lucía
- Capacity: 8,000
- Chairman: Carlos Gutiérrez
- Manager: Roberto Montoya
- League: Liga Bantrab
- Apertura 2024: 4th (Quarterfinals)
- Website: http://deportivo-malacateco.es.tl/
Home colours	Away colours

Club Deportivo Malacateco (Spanish pronunciation: [klˈub dˌepoɾtˈiβo mˌalakatˈeko]), is a Guatemalan professional football club based in Malacatán, San Marcos.

They play their home games in the Estadio Santa Lucía. They compete in the Liga Bantrab, the top tier of Guatemalan football.

== History ==
Nicknamed Los Toros, the club was founded on 8 September 1962 after a merger of clubs Morazán, Interrogación and Juvenil and by initiative of Humberto Bermúdez, Evelio de León, Felipe Sánchez, José María Munguía, José Rivera, Vicente López and Feliciano Boj. Forty five years later, they earned their historic promotion to Liga Mayor by defeating Juventud Retalteca 3–0 (3–2 agg.) in the Primera División de Ascenso 2007 Clausura final. This was also the first time in Primera División de Ascenso history that the same team won both the Apertura and Clausura tournaments, thus being automatically promoted without a need of an "extra" game. In 2008, they were relegated to Primera División after ending in last place in the Liga Mayor. In 2010, the club returned to the top division in Guatemala.

=== Carlos Mercedes Vásquez ===
In November 2010, first team squad member Carlos Mercedes Vásquez was kidnapped and murdered. A note on his body parts claimed he was killed for messing with another man's woman.

=== First Title ===
In the Apertura 2021, under Roberto Hernández, Malacateco claimed their biggest success in the club history by winning their first Liga Nacional title after defeating Comunicaciones 2-0 on 2 January 2022.

=== Rivals ===
Malacateco have a common rivalry with fellow San Marcos club Marquense, known as the “Derbi de San Marcos”.

== Crest ==
Their crest consists of the face of an angry red bull and the nickname of the team below.

== Stadium ==
The Estadio Santa Lucía is the official venue of the team, it is located in the municipality of Malacatán in San Marcos, has a capacity for 8,000 spectators and also has synthetic grass and electric lighting.

== Honours ==
=== Leagues ===
- Primera División de Ascenso
  - Champions (3): Apertura 2006, Clausura 2007, Apertura 2009
- Liga Nacional de Guatemala and predecessors
  - Champions (1): Apertura 2021

=== Friendly Tournaments ===
- Copa Internacional Tapachula
  - Winners (1): 2024

== Performance in international competitions ==
- CONCACAF League

2022 - Preliminary Round

== Players ==
=== Current squad ===
As of 24 March, 2026. Note: Flags indicate national team as defined under FIFA eligibility rules; some limited exceptions apply. Players may hold more than one non-FIFA nationality.

No.	Pos.	Nation	Player
1	GK	MEX	Miguel Jiménez
2	DF	GUA	Dilan Palencia
4	MF	GUA	Brayan Morales
5	DF	GUA	Andy Soto
6	DF	GUA	Andru Morales
7	MF	GUA	Frank de León
8	MF	GUA	Kevin Ramírez (captain)
10	MF	GUA	José Ochoa
11	FW	GUA	Nelson Andrade
13	FW	ECU	Byron Angulo
16	DF	MEX	Víctor Torres
17	DF	GUA	Roberto Meneses
20	FW	CRC	Diego Sánchez

No.	Pos.	Nation	Player
22	FW	ARG	Matías Roskopf
23	MF	GUA	Joshua Trigueño
26	MF	GUA	Frankli Quinteros
27	FW	GUA	Vidal Paz (on loan from Antigua)
30	GK	GUA	Abel Guzmán
31	MF	GUA	Sergio Pérez
32	DF	COL	Carlos Pérez
55	DF	GUA	Marco Girón
77	FW	GUA	Luis Martínez
93	DF	GUA	Marlon Chun
—	DF	MEX	Juan Esqueda
—	MF	MEX	Missael Morales

=== In ===
Note: Flags indicate national team as defined under FIFA eligibility rules; some limited exceptions apply. Players may hold more than one non-FIFA nationality.

No.	Pos.	Nation	Player
—		CRC	José Guillermo Ortiz (From Herdiano)
—		GUA	José Franco (From TBD)
—		GUA	Kenneth Cerdas (From TBD)
—	GK	MEX	Miguel Jiménez (From TBD)
—		GUA	Frank De León (From TBD)

No.	Pos.	Nation	Player
—		GUA	Gabino Vásquez (From TBD)
—		GUA	Ivan Estrada (From TBD)
—		GUA	TBD (From TBD)

=== Out ===
Note: Flags indicate national team as defined under FIFA eligibility rules; some limited exceptions apply. Players may hold more than one non-FIFA nationality.

No.	Pos.	Nation	Player
—		COL	José Erick Correa (To Limeno)
—		GUA	TBD (To TBD)
—		GUA	TBD (To TBD)
—		GUA	TBD (To TBD)

No.	Pos.	Nation	Player
—		GUA	TBD (To TBD)
—		GUA	TBD (To TBD)
—		GUA	TBD (To TBD)
—		GUA	TBD (To TBD)

== Personnel ==
=== Coaching staff ===
As of June 2025

Position	Staff
Coach	(Mexico) José Guadalupe Cruz (*)
Assistant manager	(Guatemala) TBD (*)
Reserve manager	(Guatemala) TBD (*)
Goalkeeper Coach	(Guatemala) TBD (*)
Under 17 Manager	(Guatemala) TBD (*)
Under 15 Manager	(Guatemala) TBD (*)
Sporting director	(Guatemala) TBD (*)
Fitness Coach	(Guatemala) TBD (*)
Team Doctor	(Guatemala) TBD (*)
Fitness Coach	(Guatemala) TBD (*)
Physiotherapy	(Guatemala) TBD (*)
Utility	(Guatemala) TBD (*)

== Managerial history ==
- (Guatemala) Francisco Pineda (1980–1981)
- (Brazil) Eduardo Santana (2005)
- (Brazil) Paulo César Barros (2007–2008)
- (Guatemala) Adán Onelio Paniagua (2009)
- (Colombia) Franklin Cetre (2009–2010)
- (Argentina) Héctor Trujillo (2010–2012)
- (Costa Rica) Mauricio Wright (2012-2014)
- (Brazil) Paulo César Barros (2014)
- (Honduras) Emilio Umanzor (2014–2015)
- (El Salvador) Nelson Ancheta (2015)
- (Costa Rica) Rónald Gómez (2015-2016)
- (Honduras) Emilio Umanzor (2016-2017)
- (Costa Rica) Mauricio Wright (2017-2018)
- (Costa Rica) Rónald Gómez (2018-2021)
- (Argentina) Matías Tatangelo (2021)
- (Mexico) Roberto Hernández (2021-2022)
- (Mexico) Israel Hernández Pat (2022)
- (Mexico) Adrian Arias (2022-2023)
- (Guatemala) Walter Claverí (2023 - May 2023)
- (Argentina) Gabriel Pereyra (May 2023 - Jume 2024)
- (Mexico) Roberto Hernández (July 2024 – May 2025)
- (Mexico) José Guadalupe Cruz (June 2025 - Present)
