= 2021 CONCACAF League final =

- Event: 2021 CONCACAF League
Motagua	Comunicaciones
(Honduras)	(Guatemala)
3	6
- on aggregate

First leg
Motagua	Comunicaciones
1	2
- Date: 8 December 2021
- Venue: Estadio Tiburcio Carías Andino, Tegucigalpa
- Referee: Oshane Nation (Jamaica)
- Attendance: 8,000

Second leg
Comunicaciones	Motagua
4	2
- Date: 14 December 2021
- Venue: Estadio Doroteo Guamuch Flores, Guatemala City
- Referee: Luis Enrique Santander (Mexico)
- Attendance: 5,000

The 2021 CONCACAF League final was the final round of the 2021 CONCACAF League, the fifth edition of the CONCACAF League, the secondary club football tournament organised by CONCACAF, the regional governing body of North America, Central America, and the Caribbean.

The final was contested in two-legged home-and-away format between Motagua from Honduras and Comunicaciones from Guatemala.

The first leg was hosted by Motagua at the Estadio Tiburcio Carías Andino in Tegucigalpa on 8 December 2021, and the second leg was hosted by Comunicaciones at the Estadio Doroteo Guamuch Flores in Guatemala City on 14 December 2021.

== Teams ==
Team	Zone	Previous final appearances (bold indicates winners)
(Honduras) Motagua	Central America (UNCAF)	2 (2018, 2019)
(Guatemala) Comunicaciones	Central America (UNCAF)	None

== Venues ==
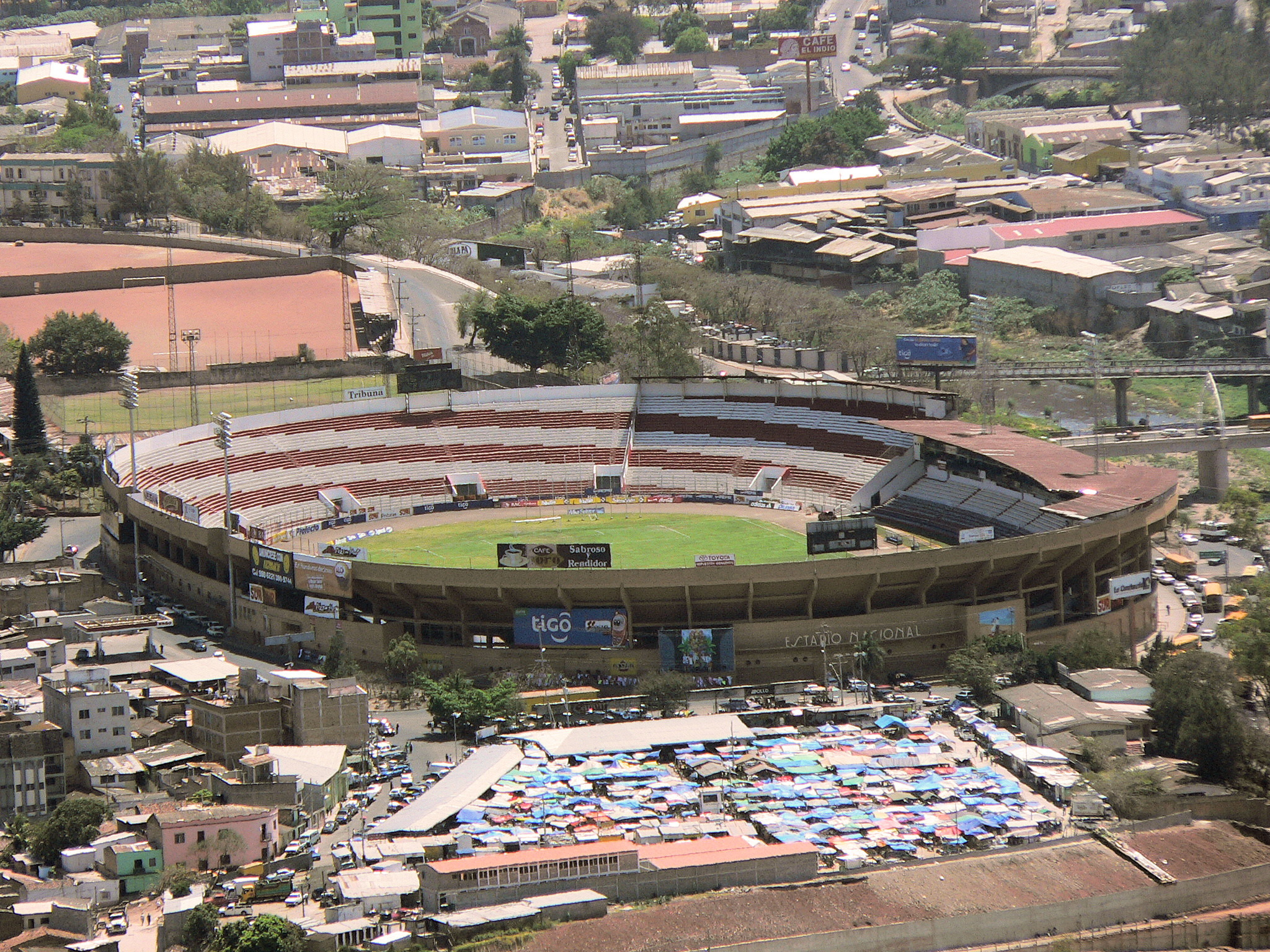
Estadio Tiburcio Carías Andino in Tegucigalpa, Honduras, hosted the first leg.

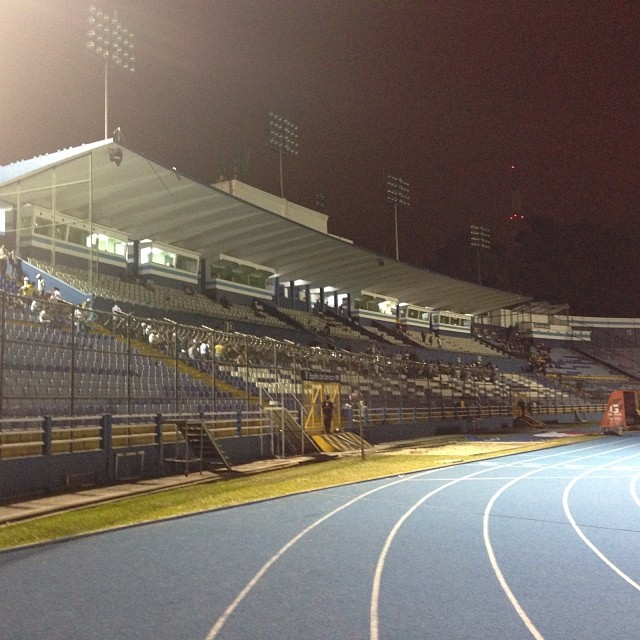
Estadio Doroteo Guamuch Flores in Guatemala City, Guatemala, hosted the second leg.

== Road to the final ==
Note: In all results below, the score of the finalist is given first (H: home; A: away).

(Honduras) Motagua				Round	(Guatemala) Comunicaciones			
Opponent	Agg.	1st leg	2nd leg	2021 CONCACAF League	Opponent	Agg.	1st leg	2nd leg
Bye				Preliminary round	(El Salvador) Once Deportivo	4–1	1–1 (H)	3–0 (A)
(Panama) Universitario	3–2	2–2 (A)	1–0 (H)	Round of 16	(El Salvador) Alianza	3–1	2–1 (H)	1–0 (A)
(Honduras) Marathón	4–0	2–0 (A)	2–0 (H)	Quarter-finals	(Costa Rica) Saprissa	5–5 (a)	3–4 (A)	2–1 (H)
(Canada) Forge FC	2–2 (a)	2–2 (A)	0–0 (H)	Semi-finals	(Guatemala) Guastatoya	3–1	1–0 (A)	2–1 (H)

== Format ==
The final was played on a home-and-away two-legged basis, with the team with the better performance in previous rounds (excluding preliminary round) hosting the second leg.

The away goals rule will not be applied, and extra time would be played if the aggregate score was tied after the second leg. If the aggregate score was still tied after extra time, the penalty shoot-out would be used to determine the winner (Regulations II, Article G).

=== Performance ranking ===
Pos	Team	Pld	W	D	L	GF	GA	GD	Pts	Host
1	(Guatemala) Comunicaciones	6	5	0	1	11	7	+4	**15**	2nd leg
2	(Honduras) Motagua	6	3	3	0	9	4	+5	**12**	1st leg

Source: CONCACAF
Rules for classification: 1) Points; 2) Goal difference; 3) Goals scored; 4) Away goals scored; 5) Wins; 6) Away wins; 7) Disciplinary points (1 point for yellow card, 3 points for indirect red card, 4 points for direct red card, 5 points for yellow card and direct red card); 8) Drawing of lots (Regulations Article 12.10.4).

== Matches ==
=== First leg ===
8 December 2021
19:00 (18:00 UTC−6)

Motagua (Honduras)	1–2	(Guatemala) Comunicaciones
Moreira 41'	Report	Aparicio 22'; Anangonó 79'

Estadio Tiburcio Carías Andino, Tegucigalpa
Referee: Oshane Nation (Jamaica)

**Motagua**	**Comunicaciones**

GK	19	(Argentina) Jonathan Rougier (c)
RB	12	(Honduras) Raúl Santos
CB	5	(Honduras) Marcelo Pereira
CB	17	(Honduras) Wesly Decas
LB	24	(Honduras) Omar Elvir
RM	34	(Honduras) Kevin López
CM	35	(Honduras) Cristopher Meléndez		(substituted off) 64'
CM	23	(Honduras) Juan Delgado
LM	31	(Argentina) Diego Auzqui	(yellow card) 37'	(substituted off) 78'
ST	21	(Paraguay) Roberto Moreira		(substituted off) 64'
ST	7	(Honduras) Iván López		(substituted off) 64'
Substitutes:
GK	25	(Honduras) Marlon Licona
FW	9	(Argentina) Gonzalo Klusener		(substituted on) 64'
MF	10	(Argentina) Matías Galvaliz		(substituted on) 64'
FW	11	(Honduras) Marco Vega	(yellow card) 86'	(substituted on) 78'
MF	22	(Honduras) Jesse Moncada
MF	29	(Honduras) Carlos Fernández		(substituted on) 64'
MF	32	(Honduras) Jonathan Núñez
Manager: (Argentina) Diego Vásquez

GK	30	(Guatemala) Kevin Moscoso
RB	31	(Guatemala) Stheven Robles
CB	28	(Colombia) José Corena	(yellow card) 53'
CB	3	(Guatemala) Nicolás Samayoa
LB	14	(Guatemala) Rafael Morales
RM	10	(Guatemala) José Contreras (c)	(yellow card) 35'	(substituted off) 66'
CM	8	(Guatemala) Rodrigo Saravia
CM	25	(Guatemala) Jorge Aparicio	(yellow card) 90+1'
LM	18	(Guatemala) Oscar Santis		(substituted off) 66'
ST	7	(Costa Rica) Andrés Lezcano		(substituted off) 76'
ST	33	(Ecuador) Juan Anangonó		(substituted off) 83'
Substitutes:
GK	23	(Guatemala) Arnold Barrios
MF	6	(Guatemala) José Carlos Pinto		(substituted on) 66'
MF	9	(Honduras) Júnior Lacayo		(substituted on) 66'
FW	13	(Guatemala) Carlos Castrillo
MF	15	(El Salvador) Alexander Larín
DF	19	(Mexico) Marco Bueno		(substituted on) 83'
DF	26	(Guatemala) Lynner García		(substituted on) 76'
Manager: (Uruguay) Willy Coito Olivera

=== Second leg ===
14 December 2021
22:00 (21:00 UTC−6)

Comunicaciones (Guatemala)	4–2	(Honduras) Motagua
Anangonó 42', 45+1', 66'; Lacayo 54'	Report	Moreira 4'; Vega 27'

Estadio Doroteo Guamuch Flores, Guatemala City
Referee: Luis Enrique Santander (Mexico)

**Comunicaciones**	**Motagua**

GK	30	(Guatemala) Kevin Moscoso
RB	31	(Guatemala) Stheven Robles		(substituted off) 80'
CB	28	(Colombia) Jose Corena
CB	3	(Guatemala) Nicolás Samayoa
LB	14	(Guatemala) Rafael Morales
RM	10	(Guatemala) José Contreras (c)
CM	4	(Cuba) Karel Espino		(substituted off) 46'
CM	25	(Guatemala) Jorge Aparicio
LM	18	(Guatemala) Oscar Santis		(substituted off) 46'
ST	7	(Costa Rica) Andrés Lezcano		(substituted off) 77'
ST	33	(Ecuador) Juan Anangonó	(yellow card) 65'	(substituted off) 84'
Substitutes:
GK	1	(Guatemala) Fredy Pérez
MF	6	(Guatemala) José Carlos Pinto		(substituted on) 77'
MF	8	(Guatemala) Rodrigo Saravia	(yellow card) 69'	(substituted on) 46'
MF	9	(Honduras) Júnior Lacayo	(yellow card) 90'	(substituted on) 46'
MF	15	(El Salvador) Alexander Larín		(substituted on) 80'
DF	19	(Mexico) Marco Bueno		(substituted on) 84'
DF	26	(Guatemala) Lynner García
Manager: (Uruguay) Willy Coito Olivera

GK	19	(Argentina) Jonathan Rougier (c)
RB	12	(Honduras) Raúl Santos
CB	5	(Honduras) Marcelo Pereira		(substituted off) 46'
CB	17	(Honduras) Wesly Decas
LB	24	(Honduras) Omar Elvir
RM	34	(Honduras) Kevin López
CM	32	(Honduras) Jonathan Núñez
CM	23	(Honduras) Juan Delgado	(red card) 71'	(substituted off) 63'
LM	31	(Argentina) Diego Auzqui		(substituted off) 80'
ST	21	(Paraguay) Roberto Moreira	(yellow card) 69'	(substituted off) 81'
ST	11	(Honduras) Marco Vega		(substituted off) 46'
Substitutes:
GK	25	(Honduras) Marlon Licona
MF	7	(Honduras) Iván López		(substituted on) 80'
FW	9	(Argentina) Gonzalo Klusener		(substituted on) 81'
MF	10	(Argentina) Matías Galvaliz
MF	22	(Honduras) Jesse Moncada		(substituted on) 63'
FW	26	(Honduras) Josué Villafranca		(substituted on) 46'
DF	35	(Honduras) Cristopher Meléndez		(substituted on) 46'
Manager: (Argentina) Diego Vásquez
