= Stheven Robles =

Guatemalan footballer (born 1995)

Personal information
- Full name: Stheven Adán Robles Ruiz
- Date of birth: 10 November 1995 (age 31) (Note: Although various sources list Robles' birthdate as 12 November, the official Comunicaciones website lists 10 November.)
- Place of birth: Guatemala City, Guatemala
- Height: 1.72 m (5 ft 8 in)
- Position: Midfielder

Team information
- Current team: Comunicaciones
- Number: 13

Youth career
- 2003–2011: Galácticos
- 2011–2015: Comunicaciones

Senior career*
Years	Team	Apps	(Gls)
2015–	Comunicaciones	288	(8)
2016	→ Carchá (loan)	9	(0)
2017	→ USAC (loan)		(0)

International career^{‡}
2015	Guatemala U20	6	(1)
2015	Guatemala U23	2	(0)
2019–	Guatemala	44	(2)
- * Club domestic league appearances and goals as of 20:00, 28 January 2026 (UTC) ‡ National team caps and goals as of 20:00, 27 March 2026 (UTC)

Stheven Adán Robles Ruiz (Spanish pronunciation: [stˈeβen aðˈan ɾɾˈoβles ɾɾuˈiθ]; born 10 November 1995), nicknamed El Pelón ("The Bald Man"), is a Guatemalan professional footballer who plays as a midfielder for Liga Bantrab club Comunicaciones and the Guatemala national team.

A youth exponent of Comunicaciones, Robles made his professional debut for the club in 2015. A year later, he went on loan to Carchá and USAC before returning to Comunicaciones in 2017. Robles has won three league titles and one CONCACAF League title.

Having previously represented the under-20 and under-23 teams, Robles made his debut for the senior team in 2019. He was featured in the squads for the 2021, 2023, and 2025 CONCACAF Gold Cup.

== Early life ==
Robles was born in Zone 18 in Guatemala City, in the Villas neighborhood, where he played football as a child.

== Club career ==
=== Comunicaciones ===
==== 2015–19: Early years ====
Prior to making his debut, Robles trialed with Argentine side Unión de Santa Fe, returning to Guatemala shortly after. He made his first-team debut under coach Willy Coito Olivera on 8 February 2015 in a 1–0 win over Halcones. A month later, on 7 March, Robles started in a 5–0 win against USAC. He won the 2015 Clausura with Comunicaciones, his first title with the club, after playing in 7 games. Robles began his second season against Marquense on 13 September 2015, where he played the full 90 minutes and provided an assist in a 3–0 away win. He also played in his first Clásico Chapin against Municipal. On 1 July 2016, Robles joined newly promoted club Carchá on a season-long loan deal. He made his debut against Mictlán on 17 July, before coming off at the 68th minute for Cristian Albizures. After 9 appearances with the club, Robles was recalled from his loan and returned to Comunicaciones on 31 December. On 1 January 2017, Robles joined USAC in the Primera División de Ascenso on a loan deal for six months. He returned to Comunicaciones once his loan expired on 1 July.

On 4 November 2017, against Xelajú, Robles was kicked in the stomach by Wilson Godoy, which caused abdominal pain. He missed the rest of the 2017 Apertura after undergoing surgery. In solidarity with Robles, several of his teammates cut their hair to show their support. The hashtags #FuerzaPelon and #Fuer2aPelon also became popular with fans on social media. Robles returned for the 301st edition of the Clásico Chapín on 20 January 2018, where he was subbed on at the 78th minute for Marvin Ceballos. On 12 May, Robles scored a long half volley from outside the box in a 1–0 victory over Santa Lucía. On 7 October 2018, Robles scored in a 3–1 victory over Carchá. Due to several injuries, Robles became the top choice for Willy Coito Olivera for the 2019 Clausura.

==== 2019–20: First goals and ACL injury ====
Robles made his CONCACAF League debut in the preliminary round in a 2–1 victory over Marathón. In the 307th edition of the Clásico Chapín, Robles was subbed on at halftime for Stefano Cincotta in a 1–0 loss. On 18 August, Robles scored his first goal for Comunicaciones at the 49th minute against Malacateco, where he shot from outside the box following a save from the goalkeeper in a 3–0 win. On 28 August, Robles started in the round of 16 match of the CONCACAF League against Guastatoya, winning 2–1 on aggregate. On 28 September, Robles started in the match against Olimpia in the quarter-finals, as Comunicaciones were eliminated from the CONCACAF League following a 2–0 defeat. On 31 October, Robles scored in the 37th minute of a 3–0 win over Xelajú. On 14 December, in the quarter-finals of the 2019 Apertura against Guastatoya, Robles scored at the 66th minute from outside the box in a 3–1 win. After scoring, he and Robin Betancourth celebrated the goal similar in style to Cristiano Ronaldo. Robles played the full 90 minutes in the semi-finals against Municipal on 22 December, as Comunicaciones were eliminated from the 2019 Apertura. On 30 December, it was announced that Robles renewed his contract with the club until 2022. He also sent a message to Municipal on social media after they had won the 2019 Apertura saying, "Enjoy it, you're only missing 5."

On 25 January 2020, Robles scored at the 75th minute of the 311th edition of the Clásico Chapín, a 4–2 win for Los Albos. On 12 February, at the 20th minute during a match against Antigua, Robles controlled the ball and faced three players, but in a cut he stood on the ball with his left leg, which caused him to lose balance and his right leg served as support. A double-header caused him to fall on the pitch and abandon the match. Robles ruptured his anterior cruciate ligament, missing the rest of the 2020 Clausura. Robles underwent surgery.

==== 2020–21: Return and Clausura finalist ====
On 29 August, Robles returned against Xelajú, where he was subbed on at the 68th minute for Jorge Aparicio. On 17 October, Robles provided an assist for Rodrigo Saravia in a 3–0 win over Iztapa. On 23 October, Robles started in the preliminary round of the 2020 CONCACAF League against Motagua, as Comunicaciones lost 15–14 on penalties. On 9 November, Robles started and was subbed off at the 78th minute in a 4–0 win over Sacachispas, marking his 100th league match for the club. On 28 December, Robles provided an assist for Andrés Lezcano in a 1–0 win over Cobán Imperial. That same day, Robles became heavily linked to a transfer to Alianza Petrolera. However, a deal was never finalized. On 17 January 2021, Robles started in the quarter-finals of the 2020 Apertura against Antigua as Comunicaciones lost 3–0 and were eliminated.

On 6 March, Robles provided an assist for José Corena in a 3–1 victory against Santa Lucía. Four days later, Robles scored in the 88th minute of a 3–0 triumph against Malacateco. On 4 April, Robles provided an assist for Rafael Morales in a 5–0 win over Iztapa. In the quarter-finals of the 2021 Clausura on 8 May against Sacachispas, Robles provided an assist in a 1–1 draw. On 21 May, in the first leg of the final against Santa Lucía, Robles started in a 4–0 loss. In the second leg, Robles scored in the 45th minute, as Comunicaciones lost 6–5 on aggregate.

==== 2021–22: CONCACAF League title and La 31 ====
Robles started in the preliminary round of the 2021 CONCACAF League against Once Deportivo in a 1–1 draw. On 19 August, Robles started in the second leg of the preliminary round of the CONCACAF League, defeating Once Deportivo 3–0. On 11 September, Robles started in the 315th edition of the Clásico Chapín in a 2–1 win. On 29 September, in the round of 16 stage of the 2021 CONCACAF League, Robles played the full 90 minutes of a 1–0 win over Alianza. On 21 October, Robles started in the 1st leg of the quarter-finals of the 2021 CONCACAF League against Saprissa in a 4–3 defeat. In the second leg, on 3 November, Robles provided an assist for Juan Luis Anangonó, as Comunicaciones won 2–1. On 23 November, Robles provided an assist for Andrés Lezcano in the 1st leg semifinals in a 1–0 win against Guastatoya. On 30 November, Robles started in the second leg of the semi-finals, winning 3–1 on aggregate, as Comunicaciones advanced to the final. In the 1st leg of the final on 8 December against Motagua, Robles provided an assist for Juan Luis Anangonó in a 2–1 win in Tegucigalpa. While celebrating the second goal for the club, a flare was thrown from the crowd and hit Robles in the head. In the second leg on 14 December, Robles started in a 4–2 win on aggregate in Guatemala City, as Robles won his second major title with Comunicaciones. Four days later, in the quarter-finals of the 2021 Apertura, Robles started in a 1–0 win against Iztapa. Robles started in the semi-finals against Municipal, where Comunicaciones advanced after a goalless draw. On 30 December, Robles started in the first leg of the Apertura final against Malacateco, losing 2–0. He also started in the second leg as Comunicaciones failed to win the title.

On 15 January, Robles provided an assist for Andrés Lezcano in a 7–0 win over Nueva Concepción. On 29 January, Robles provided another assist for Lezcano in a 3–3 draw against Iztapa. In the 1st leg of the round of 16 stage in the 2022 CONCACAF Champions League on 17 February, Robles received a yellow card in a 1–0 win over Colorado Rapids at home. In the second leg on 23 February, Robles was sent off at the 16th minute. In the first leg of the quarter-finals of the 2022 Clausura, Robles started in a 3–0 victory against Santa Lucía. Three days later, Robles started in the second leg in a goalless draw, as Comunicaciones advanced. In the first leg of the semi-finals against Malacateco, Robles played the full match in a 1–1 draw. Robles also played in the second leg of the semi-finals, ending in a goalless draw, as Comunicaciones advanced to the final. In the first leg of the final on 26 May, Robles started in a 1–0 win against Municipal. The next day, it was announced that Robles and Matías Rotondi would not play in the second leg due to making obscene gestures, and would be fined Q500. Despite this, Comunicaciones won the 2022 Clausura title.

==== 2022–23: Clausura semi-finalist ====
In the first leg of the round of 16 of the 2022 CONCACAF League, Robles started in a 1–0 loss to Diriangén. In the second leg, he provided an assist for Oscar Santis, as Comunicaciones were eliminated after a 2–1 loss on aggregate. On 4 September, Robles scored in a 2–0 win over Iztapa. On 18 September, he provided an assist for Lynner García in a 4–2 loss to Malacateco. On 8 October, Robles provided an assist for Andrés Lezcano in a 3–1 victory over Mixco. On 29 October, in the 323rd edition of the Clásico Chapín, Robles received a yellow card in a 3–2 win. On 30 November, in the first leg of the quarter-finals of the 2022 Apertura, Robles received a yellow card in a goalless draw against Guastatoya. Robles started in the second leg, as Comunicaciones won 2–0. On 6 December, in the first leg of the semi-finals against Cobán Imperial, Robles received a yellow card at the 4th minute in a 1–0 loss. In the second leg on 10 December, Robles received another yellow card at the 73rd minute, as Comunicaciones lost 3–0 on aggregate.

On 22 January 2023, Robles ruptured his muscle fibers in a match against Xinabajul, and had to be taken off at the 19th minute. Robles returned on 18 February for a goalless draw against Santa Lucía. Four days later, Robles was subbed off at the 79th minute for Erick González in a 4–2 win over Iztapa. However, Robles suffered from athletic pubalgia and had to rest for a few days. On 5 April, Robles returned in a 2–0 victory over Achuapa, coming on for Diego Santis. On 19 April, Robles scored in the 70th minute in the 5–1 win over Iztapa. On 3 May against Cobán Imperial, Robles provided an assist for Diego Barreto. In the 326th edition of the Clásico Chapín on 7 May, Robles received a yellow card after only 6 minutes in a 1–0 win. A week later, in the quarter-finals of the 2023 Clausura, Robles started in a 4–1 victory against Achuapa. In the first leg of the semi-finals on 18 May, Robles started in a goalless draw against Antigua. In the second leg, Robles started as Comunicaciones lost 4–3 on penalties.

==== 2023–24: La 32 and first CONCACAF Champions Cup ====
In the first match of Group C of the 2023 CONCACAF Central American Cup against Real España, Robles was subbed on at the 57th minute for Diego Santis in a 3–1 win. On 11 August, in the second group stage match, Robles played the full 90 minutes in a 1–0 win over Diriangén. Three days later, Robles was subbed on at the 72nd minute for Diego Santis, but was sent off 7 minutes later against Cobán Imperial. In the third match, a 4–1 victory over Águila, Robles played the full match. In the fourth and final match of Group C against Herediano, Robles was subbed off at the 58th minute after the ball hit his left eye. In the first leg of the quarter-finals against Herediano, Robles received a yellow card at the 42nd minute in a goalless draw. In the second leg, Robles received another yellow card at the 22nd minute, as Comunicaciones lost 3–2 on aggregate. In the play-in round on 31 October, Robles received a yellow card at the 48th minute against Cartaginés. On 14 November, Robles scored an own goal at the 18th minute in a 2–2 draw against Zacapa. In the first leg of the quarter-finals of the 2023 Apertura, Robles was featured in the 2–0 loss to Malacateco. In the second leg on 2 December, Robles received a yellow card at the 54th minute, as Comunicaciones won 5–2 on aggregate. Five days later, in the first leg of the semi-finals, Robles played in a goalless draw against Xelajú. In the second leg on 11 December, Robles started as Comunicaciones won 4–2 on penalties. On 17 December, in the first leg of the final, Robles started in a 1–1 draw against Guastatoya. In the second leg of the final on 23 December, Robles was close to scoring a goal from yards out, but the goalkeeper Adrián de Lemos tipped the ball over the crossbar. Comunicaciones won the match 1–0 and the 2023 Apertura, Robles' fourth major title with the club.

On 6 February 2024, in the first leg of round one of the 2024 CONCACAF Champions Cup, Robles provided an assist for Carlos Mejía in a 4–1 loss to Monterrey. In the second leg of round one, Robles played the full match in a humiliating 7–1 defeat and were eliminated. In the 328th edition of the Clásico Chapín on 17 April, Robles received a yellow card at the 21st minute in a goalless draw. A week later, in the first leg of the quarter-finals of the 2024 Clausura, Robles received a yellow card at the 49th minute in a 1–0 win against Cobán Imperial. In the second leg on 27 April, Robles received a yellow card at the 49th minute, as Comunicaciones won 3–0 on aggregate. On 2 May, in the first leg of the semi-finals, Robles played in a goalless draw against Municipal. In the second leg, Robles crashed into Alejandro Galindo after fighting for the ball in the air. He would then have to wear a cap to detain the bleeding and had to receive medical assistance to be evaluated. However, Comunicaciones lost 3–0 and was eliminated. On 20 May, it was confirmed that Robles would stay with the club for another season.

==== 2024–25: Contract extension ====
After the departure of Carlos Castrillo, Robles was given the number 13 shirt. In the first match of Group B of the 2024 CONCACAF Central American Cup against Luis Ángel Firpo, Robles was featured in the full match in a 1–1 draw. Robles started in a 1–0 win against Alianza in the second group stage match.

== International career ==
=== Youth career ===
==== 2015: CONCACAF U-20 Championship and Olympic Qualifying ====
Robles was called up to the Guatemala U20 team for the 2015 CONCACAF U-20 Championship. On 11 January 2015, he scored the only goal at the 27th minute in a 1–0 win over the hosts Jamaica.

In August, Robles was called up to the U23 squad for the 2015 CONCACAF Olympic Qualifying tournament, as Guatemala were defeated by Costa Rica in the repechage playoff of the Central American zone.

=== Senior career ===
==== 2019–2021: Beginnings and 2022 FIFA World Cup qualification ====
On 4 June 2019, Robles earned his maiden call-up to the senior national team. Five days later, he made his senior debut in a 2–0 friendly loss to Paraguay. In an interview, Robles stated that the match was very demanding.

On 6 September 2019, Robles provided an assist for Edi Danilo Guerra in a historic 10–0 win over Anguilla in the 2019–20 CONCACAF Nations League. Four days later, Robles scored his first goal for Guatemala against Puerto Rico in a 5–0 victory. Robles was one of the four Guatemalan players featured in CONCACAF's Starting XI for League C. On 17 November, Robles was featured in a 5–0 win over Puerto Rico; he received a yellow card at the 65th minute.

After being out due to injury, Robles returned on 30 September 2020 in a 3–0 friendly loss to Mexico. On 15 November, Robles provided an assist for Darwin Lom in a 2–1 victory over Honduras. He was named the man of the match.

On 23 March 2021, Robles was called up for the 2022 FIFA World Cup qualifiers. The next day, he played the full 90 minutes in a 1–0 win against Cuba. Robles also started a 3–0 win against the British Virgin Islands on 27 March. On 4 June, he played the full match in a historic 10–0 win against Saint Vincent and the Grenadines. On 9 June, Robles started in a 0–0 draw against Curaçao, as Guatemala failed to advance to the second round.

==== 2021–2023: First and second CONCACAF Gold Cup ====
On 1 July, Robles was called up by Amarini Villatoro for the 2021 CONCACAF Gold Cup qualifiers. In the first round against Guyana, Robles shot at goal, but was deflected off Reiss Greenidge, and was classified as an own goal, as Guatemala won 4–0. On 6 July, Robles provided an assist for Luis Martínez against Guadeloupe as Guatemala lost 9–10 on penalties. However, on 9 July, it was announced that Curaçao would not participate in the 2021 CONCACAF Gold Cup due to the high number of COVID-19 cases, and Guatemala would take its spot. In the first match of Group A against El Salvador, Robles started in a 2–0 defeat. In the second match against Mexico, Robles started in a 3–0 defeat. In the third match against Trinidad and Tobago, Robles played the full 90 minutes in a 1–1 draw.

On 8 September, Robles started in a 2–2 draw against Nicaragua.

On 24 April 2022, Robles scored a half volley in the 75th minute of a 4–0 win over El Salvador. Days later, Robles was subbed on at the 82nd minute for Rodrigo Saravia in a goalless draw against Mexico.

On 31 May, Robles was called up by Luis Fernando Tena to Guatemala's 23-man squad for the 2022–23 CONCACAF Nations League. Three days later, in the first Group D match, Robles came on for José Ardón in a 2–0 loss to French Guiana. In the second match, Robles played the full match in a 2–0 win over Belize. Robles received a yellow card in a 1–1 draw with the Dominican Republic, and another in a 2–0 win over the Dominican Republic.

On 24 September, Robles featured in a 4–1 loss to Colombia. On 23 October, Robles caused two penalties in favor of Qatar, causing a 2–0 loss.

After an injury Robles sustained while playing for Comunicaciones, it was confirmed that he would not be available for the CONCACAF Nations League matches against Belize and French Guiana.

On 7 June, Robles returned to the national team, being subbed on at the 77th minute for Carlos Mejía in a 2–0 loss to Mexico. Robles started in a 1–0 loss to Venezuela on 18 June.

Robles was called up to the Guatemala squad for the 2023 CONCACAF Gold Cup. He remained on the bench for the entire tournament as Guatemala topped Group D and reached the quarter-finals.

On 5 September, Robles was named to Guatemala's 24-man squad for the 2023–24 CONCACAF Nations League. Five days later against Panama, Robles was subbed on at halftime for José Ardón in a 1–1 draw. On 14 October, Robles played the full 90 minutes in a 3–2 loss to Trinidad and Tobago, as Guatemala were eliminated.

==== 2025–present: Call-ups, return, and third CONCACAF Gold Cup ====
On 29 May 2025, after a nearly two-year absence from the national team, Robles was called up for the upcoming friendly against El Salvador. Two days later, he played the entire 90 minutes in a 1–1 draw. A week later, on 5 June, Robles was called up to Guatemala's 26-man squad for the 2025 CONCACAF Gold Cup. In the first match of Group C against Jamaica on 16 June, Robles started as Guatemala won 1–0. In the second Group C match, Robles received a yellow card at the 38th minute in a 1–0 loss to Panama. On 24 June, in the third and final match of Group C, Robles came on for an injured Óscar Castellanos, as Guatemala beat Guadeloupe 3–2 and advance to the quarter-finals. In the quarter-finals against Canada, Robles collided into Jacob Shaffelburg at the 45th minute, which caused Shaffelburg to be sent off. Guatemala won 7–6 on penalties and reached the semi-final for the first time in 29 years. In the semi-finals against the United States, Robles was shown a yellow card after fouling Malik Tillman and had shots on target at goal, but Guatemala lost 2–1.

== Player profile ==
=== Style of play ===
Robles's usual position had been as a midfielder and he says that one of his greatest strengths is that he goes out to face his rivals, he likes one-on-one play and not giving up the ball.

=== Reception ===
Due to his playing style and hard work ethic, Robles has received the praise of Amarini Villatoro, as well as many Comunicaciones fans.

=== Image ===
Robles has also earned the nicknames El Comandante ("The Commander") and El Agente ("The Agent"), not only because of his military salute celebration, but also for his dedication and loyalty to the club.

== Personal life ==
=== Family ===
Robles has been in a relationship with his long-time girlfriend, Linda since 2011. The couple has two daughters. Robles has the name of Linda tattoed on his arms, while her face is tattooed on his left leg. They are undoubtedly Robles' greatest motivation for working every day.

Robles has faced much criticism for the way he dresses and his tattoos, with many people assuming him to be part of a gang. "I grew up in my neighborhood, but I was not a gang member. My brother was and that's why he left the country. They always bother me, but I don't care what they say," said Robles who is known for having multiple tattoos on his skin.

On 7 June 2025, Robles confirmed the death of his younger brother Norman Ángel Robles, and as a result, refused to participate in the 2026 FIFA World Cup qualifiers.

=== Philanthropy ===
On 2 April 2024, Robles donated school supplies to a first grade student in San Pedro Ayampuc after her parents had died. A week later, Robles also donated equipment to a club in San Pedro Ayampuc.

== Career statistics ==
=== International ===
Appearances and goals by national team, year and competition
National team	Year	Competitive		Friendly		Total	
National team	Year	Apps	Goals	Apps	Goals	Apps	Goals
Guatemala	2019	3 (Note: Appearances in 2019–20 CONCACAF Nations League)	1	1	0	4	1
Guatemala	2020	0	0	2	0	2	0
Guatemala	2021	9 (Note: Three appearances in 2021 CONCACAF Gold Cup, four appearances in 2022 FIFA World Cup qualification)	0	4	0	13	0
Guatemala	2022	4 (Note: Four appearances in 2022–23 CONCACAF Nations League)	0	4	1	8	1
Guatemala	2023	2 (Note: Appearances in 2023-24 CONCACAF Nations League)	0	3	0	5	0
Guatemala	2025	9	0	1	0	10	0
Guatemala	2026	1	0	1	0	2	0
Guatemala	Total	28	1	16	1	44	2

Scores and results list Guatemala's goal tally first.

List of international goals scored by Stheven Robles
No.	Date	Venue	Opponent	Score	Result	Competition
1.	10 September 2019	Mayagüez Athletics Stadium, Mayagüez, Puerto Rico	Puerto Rico	4–0	5–0	2019–20 CONCACAF Nations League C
2.	24 April 2022	PayPal Park, San Jose, United States	El Salvador	4–0	4–0	Friendly

== Honours ==
Comunicaciones

- Liga Bantrab: 2015 Clausura, 2022 Clausura, 2023 Apertura
- CONCACAF League: 2021

Individual

- CONCACAF Nations League C Team of the Week: 2019–20
- Tigo Sports Guatemala Player of the Week: November 16–22, 2020
