= Arnold Barrios =

Guatemalan footballer

Personal information
- Full name: Arnold Manfredo Barrios Morales
- Date of birth: 16 December 1998 (age 27)
- Place of birth: Guatemala City, Guatemala
- Height: 1.82 m (6 ft 0 in)
- Position: Goalkeeper

Team information
- Current team: Comunicaciones
- Number: 23

Youth career
- Comunicaciones

Senior career*
| Years | Team | Apps | (Gls) |
| 2018– | Comunicaciones | 19 | (0) |
| 2022 | → Santa Lucía (loan) | 11 | (0) |

International career
| 2019 | Guatemala U23 | 2 | (0) |
- * Club domestic league appearances and goals as of 20:00, 10 August 2025 (UTC)

Arnold Manfredo Barrios Morales (born 16 December 1998) is a Guatemalan professional footballer who plays as a goalkeeper for Liga Guate club Comunicaciones.

== Club career ==
=== Comunicaciones ===
==== 2018–19: Debut season ====
On 12 May 2019, Barrios would play in the quarter-finals of the 2019 Clausura against Guastatoya.

==== 2022–23: Loan to Santa Lucía ====
On 13 June 2022, Santa Lucía confirmed that they acquired Barrios on a six month loan deal.

On 23 December 2022, it was announced that Barrios would not extend his loan at Santa Lucía. Three days later, he officially returned to Comunicaciones. Shortly after, Barrios assured that he would help the club win their 32nd league title.

==== 2024–25: Contract extension ====
On 29 May 2025, Barrios would extend his contract with the club for another year.

== International career ==
On 28 May 2019, Barrios was called up to the Guatemala U23 team for the 2019 Toulon Tournament.

== Honours ==
Comunicaciones

- Liga Guate: 2022 Clausura, 2023 Apertura
- CONCACAF League: 2021
