= 2020–21 Liga Nacional de Guatemala =

68th professional season of the top-flight football league in Guatemala

Liga Nacional de Guatemala
- Season: 2020–21
- Dates: 29 August 2020 – 23 May 2021
- Champions: Apertura: Guastatoya (3rd title); Clausura: Santa Lucía (1st title)
- Relegated: Sacachispas; Sanarate
- CONCACAF League: Gustatoya; Santa Lucía; Comunicaciones
- Top goalscorer: Ramiro Rocca - 21 goals
- Stats are from the regular season only

The 2020–21 Liga Nacional de Guatemala was the 68th professional season of the top-flight football league in Guatemala. The season was divided into two championships—the 2020 Apertura and the 2021 Clausura—each in an identical format and each contested by the same 12 teams.

== Teams ==
Location of the 2019–20 Liga Nacional de Fútbol de Guatemala teams

=== Promotion and relegation (pre-season) ===
A total of 12 teams will contest the league, including 10 sides from the 2019–20 Liga Nacional and 2 promoted from the 2019–20 Primera División.

Teams relegated to Primera División de Ascenso

Siquinalá and Mixco were relegated to 2020–21 Primera División the previous season.

Teams promoted from Primera División de Ascenso

The relegated team were replaced by the 2019–20 Primera División winners Achuapa and Sacachispas.

=== Personnel and sponsoring ===
Team	Chairman	Head Coach	Captain	Kitmaker	Shirt Sponsors
Achuapa	(Guatemala) Francisco Zepeda	(Chile) Sergio Pardo	(Brazil) Juliano Rangel	NetSportswear	Tigo, Domino’s
Antigua	(Guatemala) Víctor Hugo García	(Mexico) Roberto Montoya	(Guatemala) Jairo Arreola	NetSportswear	Tigo, TBD
Cobán Imperial	(Guatemala) Irasema Meléndez	(Argentina) Ernesto Corti	(Argentina) Jorge Sotomayer	NetSportswear	Tigo, TBD
Comunicaciones	(Guatemala) Juan Garcia	(Argentina) Mauricio Tapia	(Costa Rica) Michael Umaña	Nino	Tigo, Gatorade
Guastatoya	(Guatemala) Léster Rodríguez	(Uruguay) Willy Coito Olivera	(Guatemala) Wilson Pineda	NetSportswear	Tigo, TBD
Iztapa	(Guatemala) Mario Mejía	(Argentina) Ramiro Cepeda	(Mexico) Carlos Kamiani Félix	TutoSport	Tigo, TBD
Malacateco	(Guatemala) Carlos Gutiérrez	(Costa Rica) Ronald Gomez	(Guatemala) Sixto Betancourt	Silver Sport	Tigo, TBD
Municipal	(Guatemala) Gerardo Villa	(Argentina) Sebastian Bini	(Guatemala) Jose Mario Rosales	Umbro	Tigo, TBD
Sacachispas	(Guatemala) Alexander Hernández	(Argentina) Diego Cerruti	(Uruguay) Egidio Arévalo Ríos	NetSportswear	Tigo, TBD
Sanarate	(Guatemala) Jahiro Otzoy	(Argentina) Matías Tatangelo	(Paraguay) Orlando Moreira	NetSportswear	Tigo, TBD
Santa Lucía	(Guatemala) Rodolfo Puertas	(Nicaragua) Mario Acevedo	(Brazil) Rafael da Roza	TutoSport	Tigo, TBD
Xelajú	(Guatemala) Francisco Santos	(Guatemala) Marcó Antonio Morales	(Argentina) Pablo Mignorance	MR	Tigo, Domino’s

=== Managerial changes ===
==== Beginning of the season ====
Team	Outgoing manager	Manner of departure	Date of vacancy	Replaced by	Date of appointment	Position in table
TBD	(Guatemala)	Resigned	May 2019	(Guatemala) TBD	May 2019	th (Clausura 2018)

==== During the Apertura season ====
Team	Outgoing manager	Manner of departure	Date of vacancy	Replaced by	Date of appointment	Position in table
Sacachispas	(Guatemala) Erick Gonzalez	Sacked	October 2020	(Uruguay) Alejandro Larrera	October 2020	th (Clausura 2018)
Antigua GFC	(Mexico) Juan Antonio Torres	Resigned	November 2020	(United States) Jeff Korytoski	November 2020	th (Aperura 2018)
Deportivo Achuapa	(Guatemala) Irbin Olivares	Resigned	November 2020	(Guatemala) Marvin Ivan Leon	November 2020	th (Clausura 2018)

==== Between Apertura and Clausura seasons ====
Team	Outgoing manager	Manner of departure	Date of vacancy	Replaced by	Date of appointment	Position in table
F.C. Santa Lucía Cotzumalguapa	(Guatemala) Sergio Guevara	Resigned	December 2020	(Nicaragua) Mario Acevedo	January 2021	th (Apertura 2020)
Sanarate	(Guatemala) Gabriel Castillo	Resigned	December 2020	(Argentina) Matias Tatangelo	January 2021	th (Apertura 2020)
Xelaju	(Guatemala) Walter Claveri	Sacked	December 2020	(Guatemala) Antonio Morales	January 2021	th (Apertura 2020)

==== During the Clausura season ====
Team	Outgoing manager	Manner of departure	Date of vacancy	Replaced by	Date of appointment	Position in table
Antigua GFC	(United States) Jeff Korytoski	Resigned	March 2021	(Mexico) Roberto Montoya	March 2021	12th (Clausura 2021)

== Apertura ==
=== League table ===
==== Group A ====
Pos	Team	Pld	W	D	L	GF	GA	GD	Pts	Qualification or relegation
1	Comunicaciones	16	9	5	2	25	10	+15	32	Advance to Playoffs (Final Series)
2	Malacateco	16	7	3	6	19	18	+1	24	Advance to Playoffs (Final Series)
3	Xelajú	16	6	3	7	17	22	−5	21	Advance to Playoffs (Prem. Round)
4	Antigua GFC	16	5	5	6	21	23	−2	20	Advance to Playoffs (Prem. Round)
5	Iztapa	16	5	4	7	24	28	−4	19	Advance to Playoffs (Prem. Round)
6	Santa Lucía	16	4	4	8	12	17	−5	16	Advance to Playoffs (Prem. Round)

Source: Soccerway
Rules for classification: 1) points; 2) goal difference; 3) number of goals scored.

==== Group B ====
Pos	Team	Pld	W	D	L	GF	GA	GD	Pts	Qualification or relegation
1	Municipal	16	10	3	3	33	11	+22	33	Advance to Playoffs (Final Series)
2	Cobán Imperial	16	8	5	3	22	12	+10	29	Advance to Playoffs (Final Series)
3	Guastatoya	16	4	8	4	19	19	0	20	Advance to Playoffs (Prem. Round)
4	Achuapa	16	5	4	7	17	21	−4	19	Advance to Playoffs (Prem. Round)
5	Sanarate	16	3	5	8	19	33	−14	14	Advance to Playoffs (Prem. Round)
6	Sacachispas	16	2	7	7	20	34	−14	13	Advance to Playoffs (Prem. Round)

Source: Soccerway
Rules for classification: 1) points; 2) goal difference; 3) number of goals scored.

=== Finals ===
5 February 2021 Final	Guastatoya	2–1	Municipal
01:00				Attendance: 0 Referee: Bryan Lopez Castellano

8 February 2021 Final	Municipal	1–1	Guastatoya
01:00				Attendance: 0 Referee: Walter López Castellanos

== Clausura ==
=== League table ===
==== Group A ====
Pos	Team	Pld	W	D	L	GF	GA	GD	Pts	Qualification or relegation
1	Comunicaciones	16	10	4	2	28	12	+16	34	Advance to Playoffs (Final Series)
2	Malacateco	16	3	7	6	8	14	−6	16	Advance to Playoffs (Final Series)
3	Xelajú	16	3	8	5	14	15	−1	17	Advance to Playoffs (Prem. Round)
4	Antigua	16	2	7	7	15	26	−11	13	Advance to Playoffs (Prem. Round)
5	Iztapa	16	5	7	4	29	25	+4	22	Advance to Playoffs (Prem. Round)
6	Santa Lucía	16	6	6	4	13	13	0	24	Advance to Playoffs (Prem. Round)

Source: Soccerway
Rules for classification: 1) points; 2) goal difference; 3) number of goals scored.

==== Group B ====
Pos	Team	Pld	W	D	L	GF	GA	GD	Pts	Qualification or relegation
1	Municipal	16	8	3	5	24	11	+13	27	Advance to Playoffs (Final Series)
2	Cobán Imperial	16	5	8	3	20	17	+3	23	Advance to Playoffs (Final Series)
3	Guastatoya	16	7	7	2	23	10	+13	28	Advance to Playoffs (Prem. Round)
4	Achuapa	16	4	2	10	16	27	−11	14	Advance to Playoffs (Prem. Round)
5	Sanarate	16	4	6	6	16	25	−9	18	Advance to Playoffs (Prem. Round)
6	Sacachispas	16	5	3	8	15	26	−11	18	Advance to Playoffs (Prem. Round)

Source: Soccerway
Rules for classification: 1) points; 2) goal difference; 3) number of goals scored.

=== Finals ===
21 May 2021 Final	Santa Lucía	4–0	Comunicaciones	Cotzumalguapa
02:00	Diego Ruiz 12'; Romario da Silva 28' 88'; Isaac Acuna 38'		Nil	Stadium: Estadio Municipal Santa Lucía Cotzumalguapa; Attendance: 9,000; Referee: Walter López Castellanos

23 May 2021 Final	Comunicaciones	5–2	Santa Lucía	Guatemala City
08:00	Lacayo 39' 53' 74'; Robles 49'; Royón 47'		Thales Douglas Moreira Possas 90+2'; Nelson Miranda 90+4'	Stadium: Estadio Doroteo Guamuch Flores; Attendance: 0 Referee: Mario Escobar

Clausura 2021 winners:

1st title

== Aggerate League table ==
Pos	Team	Pld	W	D	L	GF	GA	GD	Pts	Qualification or relegation
1	Comunicaciones	32	19	9	4	53	22	+31	66	
2	Municipal	32	18	6	8	57	22	+35	60	
3	Cobán Imperial	32	13	13	6	42	29	+13	52	
4	Guastatoya	32	11	15	6	42	29	+13	48	CONCACAF League round of 16
5	Iztapa	32	10	11	11	53	53	0	41	
6	Santa Lucía	32	10	10	12	25	30	−5	40	
7	Malacateco	32	10	10	12	27	32	−5	40	
8	Xelajú	32	9	11	12	31	37	−6	38	
9	Antigua GFC	32	7	12	13	36	49	−13	33	
10	Achuapa	32	9	6	17	33	48	−15	33	
11	Sanarate	32	7	11	14	35	58	−23	32	Relegation play-offs
12	Sacachispas	32	7	10	15	35	60	−25	31	Relegated to Segunda División

Rules for classification: 1) points; 2) goal difference; 3) number of goals scored.

== List of foreign players in the league ==
This is a list of foreign players in 2020-2021 season. The following players:

1. have played at least one apertura game for the respective club.
2. have not been capped for the Guatemala national football team on any level, independently from the birthplace.

A new rule was introduced a few season ago, that clubs can only have five foreign players per club and can only add a new player if there is an injury or player/s is released.

Achuapa

- (Brazil) Juliano Rangel
- (Argentina) Nícolas Martínez
- (Colombia) Marlon Negrete
- (Honduras) Joshua Vargas

Antigua

- (Costa Rica) José Mena
- (Colombia) Juan Osorio
- (Trinidad and Tobago) John Rochford
- (Brazil) Cayo Ribeiro
- (Costa Rica) Josué Martinez
- (Mexico) Éver Guzmán
- (Mexico) Genaro Castillo
- (Colombia) Deyner Padilla

Cobán Imperial

- (Argentina) Jorge Sotomayor
- (Colombia) Bladimir Díaz
- (Brazil) Janderson
- (Costa Rica) Allan Miranda
- (Panama) José Calderón

Comunicaciones

- (Costa Rica) Michael Umaña
- (Mexico) Agustín Herrera
- (Costa Rica) Andrés Lezcano
- (Colombia) Jose Corena
- (Costa Rica) Manfred Russell
- (Costa Rica) Alexander Robinson
- (Honduras) Júnior Lacayo
- (Uruguay) Nicolás Royón

Guastatoya

- (Costa Rica) Adrián de Lemos
- (Mexico) Luis Landín
- (Mexico) Omar Dominguez
- (Colombia) Edgardo Ruiz
- (Costa Rica) Aarón Navarro
- (Uruguay) Maximiliano Lombardi

Iztapa

- (Argentina) Nicolás Foglia
- (Mexico) Carlos Felix
- (Argentina) Christian Hernández
- (Costa Rica) Jordan Smith

Malacateco

- (Uruguay) Darío Silva
- (Mexico) Elmer Morales
- (Paraguay) Lauro Cazal
- (Costa Rica) Jorge Gatgens
- (Colombia) Orlando Osorio
- (Argentina) Carlos Barrochez
- (Colombia) Santiago Gómez

Municipal

- (Argentina) Alejandro Díaz
- (Uruguay) Rafael Garcia
- (Argentina) Gustavo Britos
- (Uruguay) Steve Makuka
- (El Salvador) Jaime Alas
- (United States) Gabe Robinson

Santa Lucía

- (Brazil) Rafael da Roza
- (Brazil) Denis Lima
- (Brazil) Thales Moreira
- (Brazil) Romario Da Silva
- (Costa Rica) Anllel Porras
- (Mexico) Isaac Acuña

Sanarate

- (Venezuela) Charles Martinez
- (Cuba) Yosel Piedra
- (Paraguay) Orlando Moreira
- (Argentina) César Canario

Sacachispas

- (Colombia) Jesús Lozano
- (Costa Rica) Jose Sanchez
- (Uruguay) Egidio Arévalo Ríos
- (Ecuador) Diego Ávila
- (Argentina) Leandro Rodriguez

Xelajú

- (Canada) David Monsalve
- (El Salvador) Josue Odír Flores
- (Argentina) Pablo Mignorance
- (Brazil) Israel Silva
- (Brazil) Leo Bahia
- (El Salvador) Alexander Larin
- (United States) Jeffrey Payeras
- (Honduras) Juan Yax
