= List of football clubs in Guatemala =

This is a list of association football clubs in Guatemala.

== The football clubs ==
- Aurora F.C.
- Antigua GFC
- Catarina F.C.
- Coatepeque FC
- Cobán Imperial
- Comunicaciones
- Club Deportivo Guastatoya
- Deportivo Iztapa
- Deportivo Malacateco
- Deportivo Marquense (San Marcos)
- Deportivo Mictlán (Asunción Mita)
- Deportivo Mixco
- Deportivo Nueva Concepción
- Deportivo San Pedro
- Deportivo Sanarate
- Deportivo Siquinalá
- Deportivo Xinabajul
- Deportivo Zacapa
- FC Santa Lucía Cotzumalguapa
- Heredia
- Juventud Pinulteca
- Juventud Retalteca
- Municipal
- Peñarol
- Petapa
- Sacachispas
- Sololá
- Suchitepéquez
- Universidad De San Carlos
- Tipografía Nacional
- Xelajú MC
