= Marlon Sequén =

Guatemalan footballer

Marlon Renato Sequén
Personal information
- Full name: Marlon Renato Sequén Suruy
- Date of birth: 23 June 1993 (age 33)
- Place of birth: Guatemala City, Guatemala
- Height: 5 ft 9 in (1.75 m)
- Position: Midfielder

Team information
- Current team: Guastatoya
- Number: 10

Youth career
- 2001–2011: Municipal

Senior career*
Years	Team	Apps	(Gls)
2011–2016	Municipal	96	(7)
2016–2018	USAC		
2018–2019	Sanarate	31	(2)
2019	Malacateco	16	(2)
2020–2021	Antigua	34	(0)
2021	Santa Lucía	21	(1)
2022–2025	Municipal	101	(5)
2025–	Guastatoya	4	(2)

International career
2013	Guatemala U-20	6	(1)
2013–2024	Guatemala	17	(1)
- * Club domestic league appearances and goals as of 20:00, 23 August 2025 (UTC)

Marlon Renato Sequén Suruy (born 23 June 1993) is a Guatemalan professional footballer who plays as a midfielder for and captains Liga Guate club Guastatoya.

== Club career ==
=== Municipal ===
Born in Guatemala City, Sequén, who plays as a central midfielder, joined his local side, Municipal as a youth at just 8 years old. He made his professional debut in 2011 at 18 years old. and became a regular starter during the 2013 Apertura.

=== Guastatoya ===
On 2 June 2025, it was officially confirmed that Sequén would sign for Guastatoya.

== International career ==
Sequen has represented Guatemala at the U17, U20, U21, U23 and Senior level. He earned his first cap for the Guatemalan senior national team on 11 June 2013 in a 0–0 tie with Belize.
