= Omar Domínguez =

Mexican footballer (born 1988)

Omar Dominguez
Personal information
- Full name: Omar Dominguez Palafox
- Date of birth: 13 April 1988 (age 38)
- Place of birth: San Andrés Tuxtla, Mexico
- Height: 1.76 m (5 ft 9 in)
- Position: Centre-back

Team information
- Current team: Guastatoya
- Number: 2

Senior career*
| Years | Team | Apps | (Gls) |
| 2006–2013 | Veracruz | 31 | (1) |
| 2006–2008 | → Tiburones Rojos de Coatzacoalcos (loan) | 25 | (0) |
| 2009–2011 | → Orizaba (loan) | 81 | (1) |
| 2013 | Atlético San Luis | 13 | (1) |
| 2014 | Atlante | 0 | (0) |
| 2015–2017 | Celaya | 47 | (3) |
| 2018–2025 | Guastatoya | 269 | (20) |
- * Club domestic league appearances and goals as of 9 March 2025

Omar Dominguez Palafox (born 13 April 1988) is a Mexican professional footballer who plays as a centre-back for Guatemalan Liga Nacional club Guastatoya.

== Honours ==
Guastatoya

- Liga Nacional de Guatemala: Clausura 2018, Apertura 2018, Apertura 2020
