= 2021 CONCACAF League =

Association football tournament in North America

2021 Scotiabank CONCACAF League

Tournament details
- Dates: 3 August – 14 December
- Teams: 22 (from 11 associations)

Final positions
- Champions: (Guatemala) Comunicaciones (1st title)
- Runners-up: (Honduras) Motagua

Tournament statistics
- Matches played: 37
- Goals scored: 106 (2.86 per match)
- Top scorer(s): (Ecuador) Juan Anangonó (6 goals)
- Best player: (Ecuador) Juan Anangonó
- Best young player: (Guatemala) Óscar Santis
- Best goalkeeper: (Guatemala) Kevin Moscoso
- Fair play award: (Guatemala) Comunicaciones

The 2021 CONCACAF League (officially the 2021 Scotiabank CONCACAF League for sponsorship purposes) was the fifth edition of the CONCACAF League, a football club competition organized by CONCACAF, the regional governing body of North America, Central America, and the Caribbean.

Comunicaciones defeated Motagua in the final to win their first CONCACAF League title. As winners, they and the next best five teams qualified for the 2022 CONCACAF Champions League. Alajuelense were the title holders but were eliminated by Guastatoya in the Round of 16.

== Qualification ==
A total of 22 teams participated in the CONCACAF League:

- North American Zone: 1 team (from one association)
- Central American Zone: 18 teams (from seven associations)
- Caribbean Zone: 3 teams (from two or three associations)

Therefore, teams from either 10 or 11 out of the 41 CONCACAF member associations may participate in the CONCACAF League.

=== North America ===
The one berth for the North American Zone (NAFU) was allocated to the Canadian Soccer Association through the previous year's Canadian Premier League, where the champions, decided by the Canadian Premier League Finals contested between the top two teams of the group stage, qualified. They are the second Canadian representative included in CONCACAF competitions, besides the Canadian Championship champions which qualify for the CONCACAF Champions League.

=== Central America ===
The 18 berths for the Central American Football Union (UNCAF), which consists of seven member associations, were allocated as follows: three berths for each of Costa Rica, El Salvador, Guatemala, Honduras, Panama, two berths for Nicaragua, and one berth for Belize.

All of the leagues of Central America employ a split season with two tournaments in one season, so the following teams qualified for the CONCACAF League:

- In the league of Costa Rica, both champions, and the non-champions with the best Clausura record, qualified. If there was any team which were champions of both tournaments, the non-champions with the second best Clausura record qualified.
- In the leagues of El Salvador, Guatemala, Honduras, and Panama, both champions, and the runners-up with the better aggregate record (or any team which are runners-up of both tournaments), qualify. If there is any team which are finalists of both tournaments, the runners-up with the worse aggregate record qualify. If there are any two teams which are finalists of both tournaments, the semi-finalists with the best aggregate record qualify.
- In the league of Nicaragua, both champions qualify. If there is any team which are champions of both tournaments, the runners-up with the better aggregate record (or any team which are runners-up of both tournaments) qualify.
- In the league of Belize, the champions with the better aggregate record (or any team which are champions of both tournaments) qualify.

If teams from any Central American associations were excluded, they would be replaced by teams from other Central American associations, with the associations chosen based on results from previous CONCACAF League and CONCACAF Champions League tournaments.

=== Caribbean ===
The three berths for the Caribbean Football Union (CFU), which consists of 31 member associations, were allocated via the CONCACAF Caribbean Club Championship and CONCACAF Caribbean Club Shield, the first-tier and second-tier subcontinental Caribbean club tournaments. Since 2018, the CONCACAF Caribbean Club Championship is open to teams from professional leagues, where they can qualify as champions or runners-up of their respective association's league in the previous season, while the CONCACAF Caribbean Club Shield is open to teams from non-professional leagues, where they can qualify as champions of their respective association's league in the previous season.

Besides the champions of the CONCACAF Caribbean Club Championship which qualified for the CONCACAF Champions League, the runners-up and third-placed team of the CONCACAF Caribbean Club Championship, and the winners of a playoff between the fourth-placed team of the CONCACAF Caribbean Club Championship and the champions of the CONCACAF Caribbean Club Shield, qualified for the CONCACAF League. For the champions of the CONCACAF Caribbean Club Shield to be eligible for the playoff, they were required to comply with the minimum CONCACAF Club Licensing requirements for the CONCACAF League.

== Teams ==
The following 22 teams (from eleven associations) qualified for the tournament.

- Ten teams entered in the round of 16: two each from Costa Rica, Honduras, and Panama, and one each from El Salvador, Guatemala, Nicaragua, and the Caribbean.
- Twelve teams entered in the preliminary round: two each from El Salvador, Guatemala, and the Caribbean, and one each from Canada, Costa Rica, Honduras, Panama, Nicaragua, and Belize.

Qualified teams from North America (1 team: entering in preliminary round)
Association	Team	Entry round	Qualifying method	App. (last)	Previous best (last)
Canada (1 PR berth)	Forge FC	Preliminary round	2020 Canadian Premier League champions	3rd (2020)	Quarter-finals (2020)

Qualified teams from Central America (18 teams: 9 entering in round of 16, 9 entering in preliminary round)
Association	Team	Entry round	Qualifying method	App. (last)	Previous best (last)
Costa Rica (3 berths: 2 R16 + 1 PR)	Alajuelense	Round of 16	Champions with better 2020–21 aggregate record (2020 Apertura)	3rd (2020)	Champions (2020)
Costa Rica (3 berths: 2 R16 + 1 PR)	Saprissa	Round of 16	Champions with worse 2020–21 aggregate record (2021 Clausura)	3rd (2020)	Champions (2019)
Costa Rica (3 berths: 2 R16 + 1 PR)	Santos de Guápiles	Preliminary round	Non-champions with best regular season record in 2021 Clausura	3rd (2018)	Runners-up (2017)
Honduras (3 berths: 2 R16 + 1 PR)	Olimpia	Round of 16	2020 Apertura and 2021 Clausura champions	4th (2020)	Champions (2017)
Honduras (3 berths: 2 R16 + 1 PR)	Motagua	Round of 16	Non-champions with best 2020–21 aggregate record	4th (2020)	Runners-up (2019)
Honduras (3 berths: 2 R16 + 1 PR)	Marathón	Preliminary round	Non-champions with 2nd best 2020–21 aggregate record	3rd (2020)	Quarter-finals (2020)
Panama (3 berths: 2 R16 + 1 PR)	Independiente	Round of 16	Champions with better 2020–21 aggregate record (2020 Clausura)	3rd (2020)	Quarter-finals (2019)
Panama (3 berths: 2 R16 + 1 PR)	Plaza Amador	Round of 16	Champions with worse 2020–21 aggregate record (2021 Apertura)	2nd (2017)	Semi-finals (2017)
Panama (3 berths: 2 R16 + 1 PR)	Universitario	Preliminary round	Runners-up with better 2020–21 aggregate record (2021 Apertura)	3rd (2018)	Quarter-finals (2018)
El Salvador (3 berths: 1 R16 + 2 PR)	Alianza	Round of 16	Champions with better 2020–21 aggregate record (2020 Apertura)	4th (2020)	Semi-finals (2019)
El Salvador (3 berths: 1 R16 + 2 PR)	FAS	Preliminary round	Champions with worse 2020–21 aggregate record (2021 Clausura)	3rd (2020)	Quarter-finals (2018)
El Salvador (3 berths: 1 R16 + 2 PR)	Once Deportivo	Preliminary round	Non-champions with best 2020–21 aggregate record	1st	Debut
Guatemala (3 berths: 1 R16 + 2 PR)	Guastatoya	Round of 16	Champions with better 2020–21 aggregate record (2020 Apertura)	2nd (2019)	Round of 16 (2019)
Guatemala (3 berths: 1 R16 + 2 PR)	Santa Lucía	Preliminary round	Champions with worse 2020–21 aggregate record (2021 Clausura)	1st	Debut
Guatemala (3 berths: 1 R16 + 2 PR)	Comunicaciones	Preliminary round	Non-champions with best 2020–21 aggregate record	3rd (2020)	Quarter-finals (2020)
Nicaragua (2 berths: 1 R16 + 1 PR)	Real Estelí	Round of 16	Champions with better 2020–21 aggregate record (2020 Apertura)	4th (2020)	Quarter-finals (2020)
Nicaragua (2 berths: 1 R16 + 1 PR)	Diriangén	Preliminary round	Champions with worse 2020–21 aggregate record (2021 Clausura)	2nd (2018)	Round of 16 (2018)
Belize (1 PR berth)	Verdes	Preliminary round	2019 Opening champions	2nd (2020)	Preliminary round (2020)

Qualified teams from Caribbean (3 teams: 1 entering in round of 16, 2 entering in preliminary round)
Association	Team	Entry round	Qualifying method	App. (last)	Previous best (last)
Suriname	Inter Moengotapoe	Round of 16	2021 CONCACAF Caribbean Club Championship runners-up (2nd overall)	1st	Debut
Puerto Rico	Metropolitan	Preliminary round	2021 CONCACAF Caribbean Club Championship better ranked losing semi-finalists (3rd overall)	1st	Debut
Martinique	Samaritaine	Preliminary round	2021 CONCACAF Caribbean Club Championship worse ranked losing semi-finalists (4th overall)	1st	Debut

Notes

1. Belize (BLZ): The 2020–21 Premier League of Belize was cancelled due to the COVID-19 pandemic in Belize. The team that qualified to represent the Football Federation of Belize in the 2021 CONCACAF League was Verdes (entering in the preliminary round), the 2019 Opening tournament champions (also the team with the best 2019–20 aggregate record at the time of suspension), which was the last title awarded.
2. Caribbean (CFU): The 2021 CONCACAF Caribbean Club Shield was cancelled by CONCACAF due to the COVID-19 pandemic in the Caribbean. A number of teams from non-professional leagues in the Caribbean Football Union originally set to participate in the 2021 CONCACAF Caribbean Club Shield instead participated in the expanded 2021 CONCACAF Caribbean Club Championship, and the runners-up (entering in the round of 16) and both losing semi-finalists (entering in the preliminary round) would qualify for the 2021 CONCACAF League.

== Draw ==
Location of teams of the 2021 CONCACAF League
North American Zone
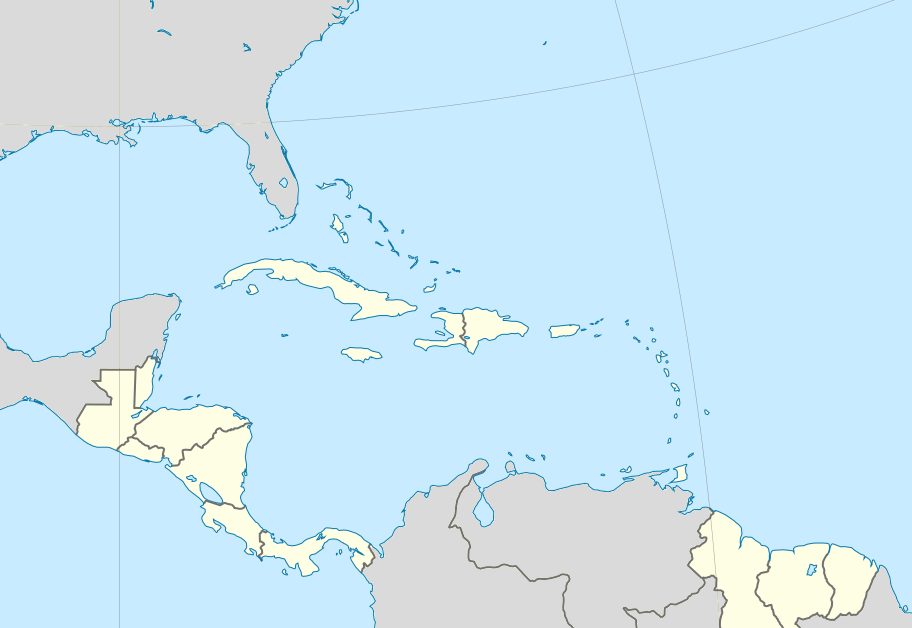
Location of teams of the 2021 CONCACAF League
Central American Zone Caribbean Zone
Teams in bold enter in the round of 16

The draw for the 2021 CONCACAF League was held on 16 June 2021, 20:00 EDT (UTC−4), at the CONCACAF headquarters in Miami, United States.

For the preliminary round, the draw determined each tie (numbered 1 through 6) between a team from Pot 1 and a team from Pot 2, each containing six teams. Teams from the same association could not be drawn against each other except for "wildcard" teams which replace a team from another association.

For the round of 16, the draw determined each tie (numbered 1 through 8) between a team from Pot 3 and a team from Pot 4, each containing eight teams. Teams from the same association could not be drawn against each other except for "wildcard" teams which replace a team from another association. The six preliminary round winners, whose identity is not known at the time of the draw, are in Pot 4 and can be drawn into the same tie with another team from the same association.

The seeding of teams was based on the CONCACAF Club Index. The CONCACAF Club Index, instead of ranking each team, is based on the on-field performance of the teams that have occupied the respective qualifying slots in the previous five editions of the CONCACAF League and CONCACAF Champions League. To determine the total points awarded to a slot in any single edition of the CONCACAF League or CONCACAF Champions League, CONCACAF uses the following formula:

Points per	Participation	Win	Draw	Stage advanced	Champions
CONCACAF Champions League (2016–17 – 2019)	4	3	1	1	2
CONCACAF League (2017 – 2020)	2	3	1	0.5	1

Teams qualified for the CONCACAF League based on criteria set by their association (e.g., tournament champions, runners-up, cup champions), resulting in an assigned slot (e.g., CRC1, CRC2) for each team.

The 22 teams were distributed in the pots as follows:

Teams in preliminary round draw
Pot	Rank	Slot	2016–17 CCL	2017 CL or 2018 CCL	2018 CL or 2019 CCL	2019 CL	2020 CL	Total	Team
Pot 1	1	CRC3	0	2	19.5	27	18	66.5	(Costa Rica) Santos de Guápiles
Pot 1	2	SLV3	0	8.5	6.5	16.5	2	33.5	(El Salvador) Once Deportivo
Pot 1	3	HON3	0	2	21.5	3	6	32.5	(Honduras) Marathón
Pot 1	4	SLV2	5	11.5	5	7.5	3	32	(El Salvador) FAS
Pot 1	5	PAN3	0	11	15	2	3	31	(Panama) Universitario
Pot 1	6	CCC3	4	5	5.5	4	10.5	29	(Puerto Rico) Metropolitan
Pot 2	7	NCA2	0	9.5	2	5	3.5	20	(Nicaragua) Diriangén
Pot 2	8	CAN2	0	0	0	9.5	10	19.5	(Canada) Forge FC
Pot 2	9	GUA3	0	0	0	12	4.5	16.5	(Guatemala) Comunicaciones
Pot 2	10	CCC4	0	2	5	5.5	2	14.5	(Martinique) Samaritaine
Pot 2	11	GUA2	6	0	0	3	3	12	(Guatemala) Santa Lucia
Pot 2	12	BLZ1	4	2	2	2	2	12	(Belize) Verdes

Teams in round of 16 draw
Pot	Rank	Slot	2016–17 CCL	2017 CL or 2018 CCL	2018 CL or 2019 CCL	2019 CL	2020 CL	Total	Team
Pot 3	1	PAN1	20	8	12	5	2	47	(Panama) Independiente
Pot 3	2	HON1	11	5	4	16.5	10	46.5	(Honduras) Olimpia
Pot 3	3	CRC1	8	5	7	7.5	12.5	40	(Costa Rica) Alajuelense
Pot 3	4	PAN2	8	13	8.5	6.5	2	38	(Panama) Plaza Amador
Pot 3	5	HON2	11	2	3	13	6.5	35.5	(Honduras) Motagua
Pot 3	6	SLV1	9	7	5	5	3	29	(El Salvador) Alianza
Pot 3	7	CRC2	14	5	3	4	2	28	(Costa Rica) Saprissa
Pot 3	8	NCA1	6	5	5.5	3	6.5	26	(Nicaragua) Real Estelí
Pot 4	9	CCC2	5	2	5	5.5	2	19.5	(Suriname) Inter Moengotapoe
Pot 4	10	GUA1	9	0	4	3	2	18	(Guatemala) Guastatoya
Pot 4	11	Winner preliminary round 1							
Pot 4	12	Winner preliminary round 2							
Pot 4	13	Winner preliminary round 3							
Pot 4	14	Winner preliminary round 4							
Pot 4	15	Winner preliminary round 5							
Pot 4	16	Winner preliminary round 6							

== Format ==
In the CONCACAF League, the 22 teams played a single-elimination tournament. Each tie was played on a home-and-away two-legged basis.

- In the preliminary round, round of 16, quarter-finals, and semi-finals, the away goals rule was applied if the aggregate score is tied after the second leg. If still tied, the penalty shoot-out was used to determine the winner (Regulations Article 12.8).
- In the final, the away goals rule was not applied, and extra time would be played if the aggregate score was tied after the second leg. If the aggregate score was still tied after extra time, the penalty shoot-out would used to determine the winner (Regulations Article 12.9).

== Schedule ==
The schedule of the competition was as follows.

Round	First leg	Second leg
Preliminary round	3–5 August	17–19 August
Round of 16	21–23 September	28–30 September
Quarter-finals	19–21 October	2–4 November
Semi-finals	23–25 November	30 November – 2 December
Final	7–9 December	14–15 December

Times are Eastern Time, as listed by CONCACAF (local times are in parentheses):

- Times up to 6 November 2021 (preliminary round, round of 16, and quarter-finals) are Eastern Daylight Time, i.e., UTC−4.
- Times thereafter (semi-finals and final) are Eastern Standard Time, i.e., UTC−5.

== Bracket ==
Preliminary round
(Belize) Verdes	0	1	1
(Costa Rica) Santos de Guápiles	1	5	6
(Canada) Forge FC	3	2	5
(El Salvador) FAS	1	2	3
(Nicaragua) Diriangén	0	1	1
(Honduras) Marathón	1	2	3
(Martinique) Samaritaine	0
(Panama) Universitario (w/o)	3
(Guatemala) Santa Lucía	3	2	5
(Puerto Rico) Metropolitan	0	1	1
(Guatemala) Comunicaciones	1	3	4
(El Salvador) Once Deportivo	1	0	1

Round of 16
(Costa Rica) Santos de Guápiles	1	2	3
(Panama) Plaza Amador	0	0	0
(Canada) Forge FC	0	2	2
(Panama) Independiente	0	0	0
(Honduras) Marathón (p)	2	0	2(5)
(Nicaragua) Real Estelí	0	2	2(4)
(Panama) Universitario	2	0	2
(Honduras) Motagua	2	1	3
(Suriname) Inter Moengotapoe	0	–	DSQ
(Honduras) Olimpia	6	–	DSQ
(Guatemala) Guastatoya (a)	1	2	3
(Costa Rica) Alajuelense	1	2	3
(Guatemala) Santa Lucía	0	2	2
(Costa Rica) Saprissa	2	4	6
(Guatemala) Comunicaciones	2	1	3
(El Salvador) Alianza	1	0	1

Quarter-finals
(Costa Rica) Santos de Guápiles	3	0	3
(Canada) Forge FC	1	3	4
(Honduras) Marathón	0	0	0
(Honduras) Motagua	2	2	4
N/A	–
(Guatemala) Guastatoya	–
(Costa Rica) Saprissa	4	1	5
(Guatemala) Comunicaciones (a)	3	2	5

Semi-finals
(Canada) Forge FC	2	0	2
(Honduras) Motagua (a)	2	0	2
(Guatemala) Guastatoya	0	1	1
(Guatemala) Comunicaciones	1	2	3

Final
(Honduras) Motagua	1	2	3
(Guatemala) Comunicaciones	2	4	6

1. ^{†} Order of legs to be decided, with the team which have the better performance in previous rounds (excluding preliminary round) hosting the second leg.

== Preliminary round ==
In the preliminary round, the matchups were decided by draw: PR-1 through PR-6. The teams from Pot 1 in the draw host the second leg.

=== Summary ===
The first legs were played on 3–5 August, and the second legs were played on 17–19 August 2021.

Team 1	Agg.	Team 2	1st leg	2nd leg
Comunicaciones (Guatemala)	4–1	(El Salvador) Once Deportivo	1–1	3–0
Diriangén (Nicaragua)	1–3	(Honduras) Marathón	0–1	1–2
Verdes (Belize)	1–6	(Costa Rica) Santos de Guápiles	0–1	1–5
Samaritaine (Martinique)	0–3 (w/o)	(Panama) Universitario	(w/o)	(w/o)
Santa Lucía (Guatemala)	5–1	(Puerto Rico) Metropolitan	3–0	2–1
Forge FC (Canada)	5–3	(El Salvador) FAS	3–1	2–2

=== Matches ===
5 August 2021
22:00 (20:00 UTC−6)

Comunicaciones (Guatemala)	1–1	(El Salvador) Once Deportivo
Larín 36'	Report	Medrano 69'

Estadio Doroteo Guamuch Flores, Guatemala City
Attendance: 3,000
Referee: Oscar Macías (Mexico)
19 August 2021
22:00 (20:00 UTC−6)

Once Deportivo (El Salvador)	0–3	(Guatemala) Comunicaciones
	Report	Contreras 49' (pen.); Lacayo 71'; Lezcano 90+8' (pen.)

Estadio Cuscatlán, San Salvador
Attendance: 200
Referee: José Torres (Puerto Rico)

Comunicaciones won 4–1 on aggregate.

3 August 2021
22:00 (20:00 UTC−6)

Diriangén (Nicaragua)	0–1	(Honduras) Marathón
	Report	Martínez 49'

Nicaragua National Football Stadium, Managua
Referee: Edgar Ramírez (El Salvador)
18 August 2021
22:00 (20:00 UTC−6)

Marathón (Honduras)	2–1	(Nicaragua) Diriangén
López 31'; Arriaga 77'	Report	Mosquera 88'

Estadio Olímpico Metropolitano, San Pedro Sula
Referee: Ricangel de Leça (Aruba)

Marathón won 3–1 on aggregate.

5 August 2021
18:00 (16:00 UTC−6)

Verdes (Belize)	0–1	(Costa Rica) Santos de Guápiles
	Report	Mora 90'

Isidoro Beaton Stadium, Belmopan
Referee: Randy Encarnación (Dominican Republic)
18 August 2021
20:00 (18:00 UTC−6)

Santos de Guápiles (Costa Rica)	5–1	(Belize) Verdes
Paradela 12'; Rodríguez 26' (pen.), 38'; B. López 27'; Myvett 55' (o.g.)	Report	Fajardo 89'

Estadio Nacional de Costa Rica, San José
Referee: Reon Radix (Grenada)

Santos de Guápiles won 6–1 on aggregate.

4 August 2021
20:00 (20:00 UTC−4)

Samaritaine (Martinique)	0–3 Awarded (w/o)	(Panama) Universitario
	Report

Estadio Nacional de Panamá, Panama City
10 August 2021
20:00 (19:00 UTC−5)

Universitario (Panama)	(w/o)	(Martinique) Samaritaine
	Report

Estadio Nacional de Panamá, Panama City

Universitario advance on walkover.

3 August 2021
20:00 (18:00 UTC−6)

Santa Lucía (Guatemala)	3–0	(Puerto Rico) Metropolitan
Osorio 15'; De León 45'; Acuña 62'	Report

Estadio Doroteo Guamuch Flores, Guatemala City
Attendance: 0
Referee: Brayan Cruz (Costa Rica)
17 August 2021
20:00 (20:00 UTC−4)

Metropolitan (Puerto Rico)	1–2	(Guatemala) Santa Lucía
Maldonado 7'	Report	Acuña 42' (pen.); Guay 62'

Juan Ramón Loubriel Stadium, Bayamón
Attendance: 200
Referee: Pierre-Luc Lauzière (Canada)

Santa Lucía won 5–1 on aggregate.

12 August 2021
20:00 (20:00 UTC−4)

Forge FC (Canada)	3–1	(El Salvador) FAS
Borges 15'; Babouli 25'; Choinière 50'	Report	Flores 21'

Estadio Cuscatlán, San Salvador
Attendance: 0
Referee: Marco Ortíz (Mexico)
17 August 2021
22:00 (20:00 UTC−6)

FAS (El Salvador)	2–2	(Canada) Forge FC
Reyes 13'; Torres 56'	Report	Navarro 49'; Grant 61'

Estadio Cuscatlán, San Salvador
Referee: Benjamín Pineda (Costa Rica)

Forge FC won 5–3 on aggregate.

== Round of 16 ==
In the round of 16, the matchups were decided by draw: R16-1 through R16-6. The teams from Pot 3 in the draw host the second leg.

On 25 September 2021, CONCACAF announced that Inter Moengotapoe and C.D. Olimpia would be disqualified from the competition due to rule breaches following the first leg of their round of 16 fixture, including an alleged payment from Inter Moengotapoe owner and player Ronnie Brunswijk to several Olimpia players.

=== Summary ===
The first legs were played on 21–23 September, and the second legs were played on 28–30 September 2021.

Team 1	Agg.	Team 2	1st leg	2nd leg
Comunicaciones (Guatemala)	3–1	(El Salvador) Alianza	2–1	1–0
Santa Lucía (Guatemala)	2–6	(Costa Rica) Saprissa	0–2	2–4
Guastatoya (Guatemala)	3–3 (a)	(Costa Rica) Alajuelense	1–1	2–2
~~Inter Moengotapoe~~ (Suriname)	Disqualified	(Honduras) ~~Olimpia~~	0–6	Cancelled
Forge FC (Canada)	2–0	(Panama) Independiente	0–0	2–0
Santos de Guápiles (Costa Rica)	3–0	(Panama) Plaza Amador	1–0	2–0
Universitario (Panama)	2–3	(Honduras) Motagua	2–2	0–1
Marathón (Honduras)	2–2 (5–4 p)	(Nicaragua) Real Estelí	2–0	0–2

=== Matches ===
22 September 2021
22:00 (20:00 UTC−6)

Comunicaciones (Guatemala)	2–1	(El Salvador) Alianza
Lezcano 4'; Lacayo 79'	Report	Riascos 36'

Estadio Doroteo Guamuch Flores, Guatemala City
Attendance: 1,000
Referee: Jefferson Escobar (Honduras)
29 September 2021
22:00 (20:00 UTC−6)

Alianza (El Salvador)	0–1	(Guatemala) Comunicaciones
	Report	Lacayo 88'

Estadio Cuscatlán, San Salvador
Attendance: 5,000
Referee: Pierre-Luc Lauzière (Canada)

Comunicaciones won 3–1 on aggregate.

23 September 2021
20:00 (18:00 UTC−6)

Santa Lucía (Guatemala)	0–2	(Costa Rica) Saprissa
	Report	Bolaños 19'; Waston 45+1'

Estadio Doroteo Guamuch Flores, Guatemala City
Attendance: 100
Referee: Randy Encarnación (Dominican Republic)
30 September 2021
20:00 (18:00 UTC−6)

Saprissa (Costa Rica)	4–2	(Guatemala) Santa Lucía
Sinclair 12'; Bolaños 16'; Torres 45' (pen.); Barrantes 75'	Report	Velásquez 18'; Acuña 45+1'

Estadio Ricardo Saprissa Aymá, San José
Attendance: 1,000
Referee: Rubiel Vazquez (United States)

Saprissa won 6–2 on aggregate.

21 September 2021
22:00 (20:00 UTC−6)

Guastatoya (Guatemala)	1–1	(Costa Rica) Alajuelense
Landín 27'	Report	De Lemos 43' (o.g.)

Estadio Doroteo Guamuch Flores, Guatemala City
Attendance: 1,000
Referee: Nima Saghafi (United States)
28 September 2021
20:00 (18:00 UTC−6)

Alajuelense (Costa Rica)	2–2	(Guatemala) Guastatoya
Venegas 22'; Martínez 29'	Report	Domínguez 82'; Landín 90'

Estadio Alejandro Morera Soto, Alajuela
Attendance: 200
Referee: Adonai Escobedo (Mexico)

3–3 on aggregate. Guastatoya won on away goals.

21 September 2021
18:00 (19:00 UTC−3)

Inter Moengotapoe (Suriname)	0–6	(Honduras) Olimpia
	Report	Bengtson 15' (pen.); Pineda 19'; Rodríguez 37'; Reyes 76'; Hernández 78', 80'

Franklin Essed Stadion, Paramaribo
Referee: Oliver Vergara (Panama)
28 September 2021
22:00 (20:00 UTC−6)

Olimpia (Honduras)	Cancelled	(Suriname) Inter Moengotapoe
	Report

Estadio Tiburcio Carías Andino, Tegucigalpa

Inter Moengotapoe and Olimpia were disqualified from the tournament by CONCACAF due to rule breaches following the first leg match.

21 September 2021
20:00

Forge FC (Canada)	0–0	(Panama) Independiente
	Report

Tim Hortons Field, Hamilton
Referee: Diego Montaño (Mexico)
28 September 2021
18:00 (17:00 UTC−5)

Independiente (Panama)	0–2	(Canada) Forge FC
	Report	Babouli 27'; Bekker 54'

Estadio Rod Carew, Panama City
Referee: Keylor Herrera (Costa Rica)

Forge FC won 2–0 on aggregate.

23 September 2021
18:00 (16:00 UTC−6)

Santos de Guápiles (Costa Rica)	1–0	(Panama) Plaza Amador
Méndez 70'	Report

Estadio Nacional, San José
Referee: Tori Penso (United States)
29 September 2021
18:00 (17:00 UTC−5)

Plaza Amador (Panama)	0–2	(Costa Rica) Santos de Guápiles
	Report	Mason 15'; Méndez 70'

Estadio Rod Carew, Panama City
Referee: Óscar Reyna (Guatemala)

Santos won 3–0 on aggregate.

23 September 2021
22:00 (21:00 UTC−5)

Universitario (Panama)	2–2	(Honduras) Motagua
González 18'; Triana 48'	Report	K. López 58', 72'

Estadio Rod Carew, Panama City
Referee: Julio Luna (Guatemala)
30 September 2021
22:00 (20:00 UTC−6)

Motagua (Honduras)	1–0	(Panama) Universitario
Decas 39' (pen.)	Report

Estadio Tiburcio Carías Andino, Tegucigalpa
Referee: Óscar Mejía (Mexico)

Motagua won 3–2 on aggregate.

22 September 2021
20:00 (18:00 UTC−6)

Marathón (Honduras)	2–0	(Nicaragua) Real Estelí
Martínez 12' (pen.); Castillo 33'	Report

Estadio Olímpico Metropolitano, San Pedro Sula
Referee: Tristley Bassue (Saint Kitts and Nevis)
29 September 2021
20:00 (18:00 UTC−6)

Real Estelí (Nicaragua)	2–0	(Honduras) Marathón
Farias 40'; Talavera 75'	Report
Penalties
Rodríguez (penalty scored); Acuña (penalty scored); Farias (penalty scored); Quijano (penalty missed); de Souza (penalty missed); Talavera (penalty missed); O. López (penalty scored); Gutiérrez (penalty missed); Acevedo (penalty missed)	4–5	(penalty scored) Arriaga; (penalty scored) Vargas; (penalty missed) Solano; (penalty scored) Costly; (penalty missed) Castillo; (penalty missed) Techera; (penalty scored) Torres; (penalty missed) Ramírez; (penalty scored) F. López

Estadio Independencia, Estelí
Referee: Óscar Macías (Mexico)

2–2 on aggregate. Marathón won 5–4 on penalties.

== Quarter-finals ==
In the quarter-finals, the matchups were determined as follows:

- QF1: Winner R16-1 vs. Winner R16-2
- QF2: Winner R16-3 vs. Winner R16-4
- QF3: Winner R16-5 vs. Winner R16-6
- QF4: Winner R16-7 vs. Winner R16-8

The winners of round of 16 matchups 1, 3, 5, 7 host the second leg.

=== Summary ===
The first legs were played on 20 and 21 October, and the second legs were played on 2 and 4 November 2021.

Team 1	Agg.	Team 2	1st leg	2nd leg
Saprissa (Costa Rica)	5–5 (a)	(Guatemala) Comunicaciones	4–3	1–2
N/A	Bye	(Guatemala) Guastatoya	—	—
Santos de Guápiles (Costa Rica)	3–4	(Canada) Forge FC	3–1	0–3
Marathón (Honduras)	0–4	(Honduras) Motagua	0–2	0–2

=== Matches ===
21 October 2021
20:00 (18:00 UTC−6)

Saprissa (Costa Rica)	4–3	(Guatemala) Comunicaciones
Sinclair 39'; Torres 45+3'; Guzmán 67'; Ramírez 84'	Report	Santis 7', 29', 66'

Estadio Ricardo Saprissa Aymá, San José
Attendance: 1,000
Referee: Selvin Brown (Honduras)
3 November 2021
19:00 (19:00 UTC−6)

Comunicaciones (Guatemala)	2–1	(Costa Rica) Saprissa
Lezcano 14'; Anangonó 64'	Report	Waston 18'

Estadio Doroteo Guamuch Flores, Guatemala City
Attendance: 3,000
Referee: Luis Enrique Santander (Mexico)

5–5 on aggregate. Comunicaciones won on away goals.

20 October 2021
18:00 (16:00 UTC−6)

Santos de Guápiles (Costa Rica)	3–1	(Canada) Forge FC
East 12'; Samuel 17' (o.g.); B. López 52'	Report	Bekker 6'

Estadio Nacional de Costa Rica, San José
Referee: Reon Radix (Grenada)
2 November 2021
20:00

Forge FC (Canada)	3–0	(Costa Rica) Santos de Guápiles
Browne 29'; Babouli 65'; Navarro 82'	Report

Tim Hortons Field, Hamilton
Referee: Armando Villarreal (United States)

Forge FC won 4–3 on aggregate.

21 October 2021
22:00 (20:00 UTC−6)

Marathón (Honduras)	0–2	(Honduras) Motagua
	Report	Auzqui 6'; Klusener 63'

Estadio Olímpico Metropolitano, San Pedro Sula
Referee: Walter López (Honduras)
2 November 2021
22:00 (20:00 UTC−6)

Motagua (Honduras)	2–0	(Honduras) Marathón
Moreira 81', 88'	Report

Estadio Tiburcio Carías Andino, Tegucigalpa
Referee: Daneon Parchment (Jamaica)

Motagua won 4–0 on aggregate.

== Semi-finals ==
In the semi-finals, the matchups were determined as follows:

- SF1: Winner QF1 vs. Winner QF2
- SF2: Winner QF3 vs. Winner QF4

The semi-finalists in each tie which had the better performance in previous rounds (excluding preliminary round) hosted the second leg.

Pos	Team	Pld	W	D	L	GF	GA	GD	Pts	Host
1 (SF1)	(Guatemala) Comunicaciones	4	3	0	1	8	6	+2	9	Second leg
2 (SF1)	(Guatemala) Guastatoya	2	0	2	0	3	3	0	2	First leg
1 (SF2)	(Honduras) Motagua	4	3	1	0	7	2	+5	10	Second leg
2 (SF2)	(Canada) Forge FC	4	2	1	1	6	3	+3	7	First leg

Source: CONCACAF
Rules for classification: 1) Points; 2) Goal difference; 3) Goals scored; 4) Away goals scored; 5) Wins; 6) Away wins; 7) Disciplinary points (1 point for yellow card, 3 points for indirect red card, 4 points for direct red card, 5 points for yellow card and direct red card); 8) Drawing of lots (Regulations Article 12.10.4).

=== Summary ===
The first legs were played from 23 to 25 November, and the second legs were played from 30 November – 2 December 2021.

Team 1	Agg.	Team 2	1st leg	2nd leg
Guastatoya (Guatemala)	1–3	(Guatemala) Comunicaciones	0–1	1–2
Forge FC (Canada)	2–2 (a)	(Honduras) Motagua	2–2	0–0

=== Matches ===
23 November 2021
22:00 (21:00 UTC−6)

Guastatoya (Guatemala)	0–1	(Guatemala) Comunicaciones
	Report	Lezcano 63'

Estadio Doroteo Guamuch Flores, Guatemala City
Attendance: 5,000
Referee: Keylor Herrera (Costa Rica)
30 November 2021
22:00 (21:00 UTC−6)

Comunicaciones (Guatemala)	2–1	(Guatemala) Guastatoya
Anangonó 46'; Lezcano 63'	Report	Landín 73'

Estadio Doroteo Guamuch Flores, Guatemala City
Attendance: 4,000
Referee: Armando Villarreal (United States)

Comunicaciones won 3–1 on aggregate.

24 November 2021
20:00

Forge FC (Canada)	2–2	(Honduras) Motagua
Navarro 83'; Awuah 90+3'	Report	K. López 43'; Pereira 64'

Tim Hortons Field, Hamilton
Attendance: 3,000
Referee: Luis Enrique Santander (Mexico)
1 December 2021
20:00 (19:00 UTC−6)

Motagua (Honduras)	0–0	(Canada) Forge FC
	Report

Estadio Tiburcio Carías Andino, Tegucigalpa
Attendance: 13,000
Referee: José Torres (Puerto Rico)

2–2 on aggregate. Motagua won on away goals.

== Final ==
In the final (Winner SF1 vs. Winner SF2), the finalists which had the better performance in previous rounds (excluding preliminary round) hosted the second leg.

Pos	Team	Pld	W	D	L	GF	GA	GD	Pts	Host
1	(Guatemala) Comunicaciones	6	5	0	1	11	7	+4	15	2nd leg
2	(Honduras) Motagua	6	3	3	0	9	4	+5	12	1st leg

Source: CONCACAF
Rules for classification: 1) Points; 2) Goal difference; 3) Goals scored; 4) Away goals scored; 5) Wins; 6) Away wins; 7) Disciplinary points (1 point for yellow card, 3 points for indirect red card, 4 points for direct red card, 5 points for yellow card and direct red card); 8) Drawing of lots (Regulations Article 12.10.4).

=== Summary ===
The first leg was played on 8 December, and the second leg was played on 14 December 2021.

Team 1	Agg.	Team 2	1st leg	2nd leg
Motagua (Honduras)	3–6	(Guatemala) Comunicaciones	1–2	2–4

=== Matches ===
8 December 2021
19:00 (18:00 UTC−6)

Motagua (Honduras)	1–2	(Guatemala) Comunicaciones
Moreira 41'	Report	Aparicio 22'; Anangonó 79'

Estadio Tiburcio Carías Andino, Tegucigalpa
Referee: Oshane Nation (Jamaica)
14 December 2021
22:00 (21:00 UTC−6)

Comunicaciones (Guatemala)	4–2	(Honduras) Motagua
Anangonó 42', 45+1', 66'; Lacayo 54'	Report	Moreira 4'; Vega 27'

Estadio Doroteo Guamuch Flores, Guatemala City
Referee: Luis Enrique Santander (Mexico)

Comunicaciones won 6–3 on aggregate.

== Top goalscorers ==
Team eliminated or inactive for this round.

Rank	Player	Team	Goals	By round									
Rank	Player	Team	Goals	PR1	PR2	2R1	2R2	QF1	QF2	SF1	SF2	F1	F2
1	(Ecuador) Juan Anangonó	(Guatemala) Comunicaciones	6						1		1	1	3
2	(Costa Rica) Andrés Lezcano	(Guatemala) Comunicaciones	5		1	1			1	1	1		
3	(Honduras) Júnior Lacayo	(Guatemala) Comunicaciones	4		1	1	1						1
3	(Paraguay) Roberto Moreira	(Honduras) Motagua	4						2			1	1
5	(Mexico) Isaac Acuña	(Guatemala) Santa Lucía	3	1	1		1						
5	(Canada) Molham Babouli	(Canada) Forge FC	3	1			1		1				
5	(Mexico) Luis Landín	(Guatemala) Guastatoya	3			1	1				1		
5	(Honduras) Kevin López	(Honduras) Motagua	3			2				1			
5	(Costa Rica) Joshua Navarro	(Canada) Forge FC	3		1				1	1			
5	(Guatemala) Óscar Santis	(Guatemala) Comunicaciones	3					3					

== Qualification to CONCACAF Champions League ==
Starting from the round of 16, teams were ranked based on their results (excluding preliminary round). Based on the ranking, the top six teams, i.e., champions, runners-up, both losing semi-finalists, and best two losing quarter-finalists, qualified for the 2022 CONCACAF Champions League.

Pos	Team	Pld	W	D	L	GF	GA	GD	Pts	Qualification
1	(Guatemala) Comunicaciones	8	7	0	1	17	10	+7	21	Champions; 2022 CONCACAF Champions League
2	(Honduras) Motagua	8	3	3	2	12	10	+2	12	Runners-up; 2022 CONCACAF Champions League
3	(Canada) Forge FC	6	2	3	1	8	5	+3	9	Semi-finalists; 2022 CONCACAF Champions League
4	(Guatemala) Guastatoya	4	0	2	2	4	6	−2	2	Semi-finalists; 2022 CONCACAF Champions League
5	(Costa Rica) Saprissa	4	3	0	1	11	7	+4	9	Quarter-finalists; 2022 CONCACAF Champions League
6	(Costa Rica) Santos de Guápiles	4	3	0	1	6	4	+2	9	Quarter-finalists; 2022 CONCACAF Champions League
7	(Honduras) Marathón	4	1	0	3	2	6	−4	3	Quarter-finalists
8	(Nicaragua) Real Estelí	2	1	0	1	2	2	0	3	Round of 16
9	(Costa Rica) Alajuelense	2	0	2	0	3	3	0	2	Round of 16
10	(Panama) Universitario	2	0	1	1	2	3	−1	1	Round of 16
11	(Panama) Independiente	2	0	1	1	0	2	−2	1	Round of 16
12	(El Salvador) Alianza	2	0	0	2	1	3	−2	0	Round of 16
13	(Guatemala) Santa Lucía	2	0	0	2	2	6	−4	0	Round of 16
14	(Panama) Plaza Amador	2	0	0	2	0	3	−3	0	Round of 16
15	(Honduras) Olimpia	1	1	0	0	6	0	+6	3	Disqualified
16	(Suriname) Inter Moengotapoe	1	0	0	1	0	6	−6	0	Disqualified

Source: CONCACAF
Rules for classification: 1) Points; 2) Goal difference; 3) Goals scored; 4) Away goals scored; 5) Wins; 6) Away wins; 7) Disciplinary points (1 point for yellow card, 3 points for indirect red card, 4 points for direct red card, 5 points for yellow card and direct red card); 8) Drawing of lots (Regulations Article 12.10.4).

== Awards ==
The following awards were given at the conclusion of the tournament:

Award	Player	Team
Golden Ball	(Ecuador) Juan Anangonó	(Guatemala) Comunicaciones
Golden Boot	(Ecuador) Juan Anangonó	(Guatemala) Comunicaciones
Golden Glove	(Guatemala) Kevin Moscoso	(Guatemala) Comunicaciones
Best Young Player	(Guatemala) Óscar Santis	(Guatemala) Comunicaciones
Fair Play Award	—	(Guatemala) Comunicaciones

Team of the Tournament
Position	Player	Team
GK	(Guatemala) Kevin Moscoso	(Guatemala) Comunicaciones
DF	(Honduras) Marcelo Pereira	(Honduras) Motagua
DF	(Costa Rica) Alexander Robinson	(Guatemala) Comunicaciones
DF	(Mexico) Omar Domínguez	(Guatemala) Guastatoya
MF	(Guatemala) Óscar Santis	(Guatemala) Comunicaciones
MF	(Canada) Molham Babouli	(Canada) Forge
MF	(Honduras) Kevin López	(Honduras) Motagua
MF	(Costa Rica) Osvaldo Rodríguez	(Costa Rica) Santos de Guápiles
FW	(Honduras) Júnior Lacayo	(Guatemala) Comunicaciones
FW	(Ecuador) Juan Anangonó	(Guatemala) Comunicaciones
FW	(Costa Rica) Andrés Lezcano	(Guatemala) Comunicaciones

== See also ==
- 2022 CONCACAF Champions League
