= Luis Acuña =

Argentine footballer

Personal information
- Full name: Luis Alberto Acuña
- Date of birth: 20 January 1989 (age 37)
- Place of birth: Merlo, Buenos Aires, Argentina
- Height: 1.71 m (5 ft 7 in)
- Position: Midfielder

Youth career
- Vélez Sarsfield

Senior career*
| Years | Team | Apps | (Gls) |
| 2009–2010 | Vélez Sarsfield | 0 | (0) |
| 2010 | → Sarmiento de Junín (loan) | 11 | (0) |
| 2011 | Deportes Puerto Montt | 35 | (6) |
| 2012 | Everton | 13 | (1) |
| 2013 | San Marcos | 9 | (0) |
| 2013–2014 | Barnechea | 33 | (3) |
| 2014–2015 | Mérida | 22 | (5) |
| 2015–2017 | Venados | 32 | (1) |
| 2017–2018 | Crucero del Norte | 12 | (0) |
| 2018–2019 | Deportivo Carchá | – | (–) |
| 2019 | Deportivo Merlo | 10 | (0) |
| 2020–2021 | Real Estelí | 74 | (13) |
| 2022 | Independiente Petrolero | 14 | (0) |
| 2022 | Águila | 13 | (0) |
| 2023–2024 | Jocoro | 53 | (9) |
- * Club domestic league appearances and goals as of 1 May 2024

Luis Alberto Acuña (born January 20, 1989, in Merlo, Buenos Aires, Argentina) is an Argentine footballer who most recently played as a midfielder for Salvadoran club Jocoro.

== Career ==
Besides Argentina, he has played in Chile, Mexico, El Salvador, Guatemala, and Nicaragua.

In March 2024, he left Jocoro.

=== Teams ===
- (Argentina) Vélez Sársfield 2009–2010
- (Argentina) Sarmiento de Junín 2010
- (Chile) Deportes Puerto Montt 2011
- (Chile) Everton 2012
- (Chile) San Marcos de Arica 2013
- (Chile) A.C. Barnechea 2013–2014
- (Mexico) Venados F.C. 2014–2017
- (Nicaragua) Real Esteli 2019–present
