= Isaac Acuña =

Mexican footballer

Personal information
- Full name: Isaac Acuña Sánchez
- Date of birth: 18 August 1989 (age 37)
- Place of birth: Calexico, California, United States
- Height: 1.86 m (6 ft 1 in)
- Position: Forward

Youth career
- 2008–2010: América

Senior career*
Years	Team	Apps	(Gls)
2008–2009	→ Socio Águila (loan)	2	(0)
2010–2012	América	7	(0)
2011	→ Querétaro (loan)	9	(3)
2012	→ Mérida (loan)	15	(1)
2015	CD Pacífico	3	(0)
2015–2017	Celaya	5	(0)
2017	Sanarate	21	(7)
2018	Comunicaciones	18	(3)
2018–2019	Guastatoya	37	(8)
2019	New York Cosmos B	4	(3)
2020–2021	New York Cosmos	2	(0)
2020	→ Detroit City (loan)	0	(0)
2021–2023	Santa Lucía	73	(34)
2023	Municipal	15	(2)
2023–2024	Santa Lucía		
2024–2025	Guastatoya		

International career
2011	Mexico U22	7	(1)
- * Club domestic league appearances and goals as of 12 June 2022

Isaac Acuña Sánchez (born 18 August 1989) is a professional footballer who plays as a forward. Born in the United States, he represented the Mexico national under-22 team.

== Career ==
=== América ===
On April 9, 2010, Acuña made his debut for América against Jaguares de Chiapas coming on as a substitute in the 85th minute. On July 13, 2011, Acuna scored on a header against Atlas in the Reto II at The Home Depot Center in Carson, Ca from a center made by Oscar Adrian Rojas and the game was eventually won by América 2–1.

=== Querétaro ===
On January 1, 2011, Acuña joined Querétaro on loan. On his first game vs Santos Laguna, he scored a goal by taking out Oswaldo Sanchez and then tapping the ball in. He then went off to score a stunning goal against Cruz Azul. Against Puebla F.C. he netted a header, thus increasing his goal tally to 3 on the 2011

== Honours ==
Guastatoya

- Liga Nacional de Guatemala: Apertura 2018

Santa Lucía

- Liga Nacional de Guatemala: Clausura 2021
