= Luis Ángel Landín =

Mexican footballer (born 1985)

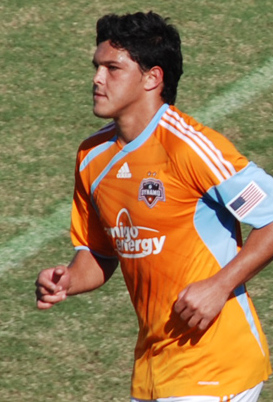
- Landín with Houston Dynamo in 2009

Personal information
- Full name: Luis Ángel Landín Cortés
- Date of birth: 23 July 1985 (age 41)
- Place of birth: Zamora, Michoacán, Mexico
- Height: 1.84 m (6 ft 0 in)
- Position: Forward

Senior career*
Years	Team	Apps	(Gls)
2004–2007	Pachuca	81	(19)
2007–2008	Morelia	48	(8)
2009	→ Cruz Azul (loan)	16	(6)
2009–2010	→ Houston Dynamo (loan)	16	(2)
2010–2011	Atlante	7	(0)
2012	Puebla	17	(2)
2012–2013	Querétaro	28	(5)
2013	Tecos	12	(3)
2014	Ballenas Galeana	13	(4)
2015	Zacatepec	10	(1)
2015–2016	Brownsville Barracudas (indoor)	10	(15)
2016–2017	Pérez Zeledón	28	(15)
2017–2018	Herediano	41	(10)
2018	Malacateco	13	(5)
2019	Municipal	21	(7)
2019–2022	Guastatoya	116	(43)
2022	Comunicaciones	23	(8)
2023–2024	Municipal Limeño	42	(17)

International career
2008	Mexico U23	8	(2)
2006–2007	Mexico	5	(0)
Medal record
Representing Mexico
Third place	Copa America	2007
- * Club domestic league appearances and goals as of 8 December 2022

Luis Ángel Landín Cortés (born 23 July 1985) is a Mexican professional footballer who plays as a forward.

== Career ==
=== Club ===
Landín began his career in the youth development system of Pachuca. Landín made Primera División de México (Mexico First Division) debut in 2004 with the Pachuca senior team and played with the club until 2007. For the Apertura 2007, Landín was sold to Monarcas Morelia where he served as a forward. For the Clausura 2009, he was loaned to Cruz Azul.

Landín signed with Major League Soccer side Houston Dynamo on 20 August 2009, as the club's first Designated Player. Landin was released by the Houston Dynamo on 14 July 2010 after less than one season with the team. Landín signed with Atlante on 14 July 2010 and was on loan two days later.

After a few years playing at Ascenso MX, Landin signed with Brownsville Barracudas as a designated player for the MASL 2015–2016 season in September 2015. He resigned on January 24. ending his indoor soccer venture with 15 goals and 23 points (goals & assists).

He signed with Costa Rican club Pérez Zeledon in May 2016. After a poor first season where he scored only 2 goals, he ended as second best scorer at the Campeonato de Verano 2017 in the Costa Rican Primera División with 13 goals, just below Erick Scott. He didn't extend his contract becoming a free agent.

Landín signed with C.S. Herediano on 27 April 2017.

=== International ===
Landín made his senior national team debut on 1 March 2006, in a friendly against Ghana in Frisco, Texas. Landín was called in to replace the injured Jared Borgetti in the 2007 Copa América, where he made two appearances. He also played for Mexico U-23 in the 2008 CONCACAF Men's Pre-Olympic Tournament as Mexico failed to qualify for Olympic medal competition.

== Personal ==
In 2009, Landín married his girlfriend.

== Career statistics ==
=== International ===
As of match played 12 September 2007

National team	Year	Apps	Goals
Mexico	2006	1	0
Mexico	2007	4	0
Total		5	0

== Honours ==
Pachuca

- Mexican Primera División: Clausura 2006, Clausura 2007
- CONCACAF Champions Cup: 2007
- Copa Sudamericana: 2006

Guastatoya

- Liga Nacional de Guatemala: Apertura 2020

Individual

- Mexican Primera División Best Rookie: Clausura 2006
