= Kevin Moscoso =

Guatemalan footballer

Personal information
- Full name: Kevin Jorge Amílcar Moscoso Mayén
- Date of birth: 13 June 1993 (age 33)
- Place of birth: Guatemala City, Guatemala
- Height: 1.85 m (6 ft 1 in)
- Position: Goalkeeper

Team information
- Current team: Mixco
- Number: 30

Senior career*
| Years | Team | Apps | (Gls) |
| 2019–2024 | Comunicaciones | 57 | (0) |
| 2020 | → Siquinalá (loan) | 13 | (0) |
| 2020–2021 | → Cobán Imperial (loan) | 17 | (0) |
| 2023–2024 | → Mixco (loan) | 57 | (0) |
| 2024– | Mixco | 87 | (0) |

International career^{‡}
| 2020– | Guatemala | 5 | (0) |
- * Club domestic league appearances and goals as of 19:37, 27 May 2026 (UTC) ‡ National team caps and goals as of 19 April 2026

Kevin Jorge Amílcar Moscoso Mayén (born 13 June 1993) is a Guatemalan professional footballer who plays as a goalkeeper for Liga Guate club Mixco and the Guatemala national team.

== International career ==
He made his debut for the full Guatemalan team against Nicaragua on 7 October 2020.

== Career statistics ==
=== Club ===
As of match played 19 May 2024

Appearances and goals by club, season and competition
| Club | Season | League | | | National cup | | Continental | | Other | | Total | |
| Club | Season | Division | Apps | Goals | Apps | Goals | Apps | Goals | Apps | Goals | Apps | Goals |
|---|---|---|---|---|---|---|---|---|---|---|---|---|
| Comunicaciones | 2019–20 | Liga Nacional de Guatemala | 0 | 0 | — | | 0 | 0 | — | | 0 | 0 |
| Comunicaciones | 2020–21 | Liga Nacional de Guatemala | 15 | 0 | — | | — | | — | | 15 | 0 |
| Comunicaciones | 2021–22 | Liga Nacional de Guatemala | 32 | 0 | — | | 13 | 0 | — | | 45 | 0 |
| Comunicaciones | 2022–23 | Liga Nacional de Guatemala | 10 | 0 | — | | 1 | 0 | — | | 11 | 0 |
| Comunicaciones | Total | | 57 | 0 | — | | 14 | 0 | — | | 71 | 0 |
| Siquinalá (loan) | 2019–20 | Liga Nacional de Guatemala | 13 | 0 | — | | — | | — | | 13 | 0 |
| Cobán Imperial (loan) | 2020–21 | Liga Nacional de Guatemala | 17 | 0 | — | | — | | — | | 17 | 0 |
| Mixco (loan) | 2022–23 | Liga Nacional de Guatemala | 23 | 0 | — | | — | | — | | 23 | 0 |
| Mixco (loan) | 2023–24 | Liga Nacional de Guatemala | 37 | 0 | — | | — | | — | | 37 | 0 |
| Mixco (loan) | Total | | 60 | 0 | — | | — | | — | | 60 | 0 |
| Career Total | | | 147 | 0 | 0 | 0 | 14 | 0 | 0 | 0 | 161 | 0 |

== Honours ==
Comunicaciones

- CONCACAF League: 2021
- Liga Nacional de Guatemala: Clausura 2022

Individual

- CONCACAF League Golden Glove: 2021
