= Lynner García =

Guatemalan footballer

Personal information
- Full name: Lynner O'Neal García Mejía
- Date of birth: 7 May 2000 (age 26)
- Place of birth: Guatemala City, Guatemala
- Height: 1.70 m (5 ft 7 in)
- Position: Attacking midfielder

Youth career
- Comunicaciones

Senior career*
Years	Team	Apps	(Gls)
2018–2026	Comunicaciones	155	(33)
2020–2021	→ Iztapa (loan)	15	(3)

International career
2022–2023	Guatemala	3	(0)
- * Club domestic league appearances and goals as of 20:00, 17 August 2025 (UTC)

Lynner O'Neal García Mejía (Spanish pronunciation: [linnˈeɾ ˈo'neˈal ɡaɾθˈia mexˈia]; born 7 May 2000) is a Guatemalan professional footballer who plays as an attacking midfielder.

== Club career ==
=== Comunicaciones ===
==== 2020–21: Loan to Iztapa ====
On 4 September 2020, it was announced that Lynner would join Iztapa on loan until the end of the season.

==== 2021–22: Top goalscorer, CONCACAF League title, and first league title ====
On 1 August 2021, Lynner provided an assist for Karel Espino in a 4–0 win over Sololá. With four goals to his name, Lynner had already become the top goalscorer of the 2021 Apertura.

==== 2024–25: Transfer rumors ====
On 18 December 2024, rumors began speculating that Lynner would go out on loan.

== International career ==
On 7 November 2023, after being absent for a year and a half, Lynner was called up to squad for an upcoming friendly against Jamaica.

== Honours ==
Comunicaciones

- Liga Nacional: 2022 Clausura, 2023 Apertura
- Copa Campeón de Campeones runner-up: 2024
- CONCACAF League: 2021
