= Jorge Gatgens =

Costa Rican footballer (born 1988)

Personal information
- Full name: Jorge Ignacio Gatgens Quirós
- Date of birth: July 23, 1988 (age 38)
- Place of birth: Costa Rica
- Height: 1.76 m (5 ft 9 in)
- Position: Right midfielder

Senior career*
Years	Team	Apps	(Gls)
2007–2011	Pérez Zeledón	91	(3)
2011–2013	Alajuelense	39	(3)
2013–2017	Pérez Zeledón	79	(8)
2017	AD San Carlos	8	(0)
2017	UCR	5	(0)
2017–2018	Liberia	27	(3)
2018–2019	Guastatoya	46	(4)
2020–2022	Malacateco	28	(1)
2022	Achuapa	1	(0)

International career
2009	Costa Rica	1	(0)
- * Club domestic league appearances and goals as of 8 February 2021 (UTC)

Jorge Ignacio Gatgens Quirós (born 23 July 1988) is a Costa Rican football right midfielder.

== Club career ==
Gatgens started his career at Pérez Zeledón for whom he made his debut on 23 July 2007 against Puntarenas and joined Alajuelense in summer 2011. He returned to Pérez Zeledón in summer 2013.

== International career ==
In June 2007, he was omitted from the definitive Costa Rica U20 for the 2007 FIFA U-20 World Cup held in Canada.

Gatgens made his debut in Costa Rica for an October 1996 friendly match against Venezuela, that as of May 2014 was his sole international match. He was included in the Costa Rica national football team for the 2011 Copa América, but did not play at all in the tournament.
