= Rafael Morales (footballer, born 1988) =

Guatemalan footballer (born 1988)

Personal information
- Full name: Rafael Humberto Morales de Leon
- Date of birth: 6 April 1988 (age 38)
- Place of birth: Jocotenango, Guatemala
- Height: 1.77 m (5 ft 10 in)
- Position: Left-back

Team information
- Current team: Comunicaciones
- Number: 14

Youth career
- 2007–2008: Antigua

Senior career*
Years	Team	Apps	(Gls)
2008–2014	Comunicaciones	147	(10)
2014–2015	Saprissa	17	(0)
2015–	Comunicaciones	354	(15)

International career
- Guatemala U17
- Guatemala U20
- Guatemala U23
2011–2019	Guatemala	22	(2)
- * Club domestic league appearances and goals as of 20:00, 4 May 2025 (UTC)

Rafael Humberto Morales de Leon (born 6 April 1988), nicknamed El Cucurucho, is a Guatemalan professional footballer who plays as a defender for Liga Guate club Comunicaciones.

== Club career ==
=== Comunicaciones (2008–2014 and 2015–present) ===
Morales began his career playing for Comunicaciones.

=== Saprissa (2014–2015) ===
Saprissa announced the signing of Morales in June 2014. He scored his first goal in his debut against Mexican side León.

== Career statistics ==
Country			Domestic				International		Total	
Guatemala			League		Cup		Cup		Total	
League	Club	Season	Apps	Goals	Apps	Goals	Apps	Goals	Apps	Goals
Liga Nacional	Comunicaciones	2011-2012	41	5	0	0	5	1	46	6
Liga Nacional	Comunicaciones	2012-2013	49	2	0	0	0	0	49	2
Liga Nacional	Comunicaciones	2013-2014	39	2	0	0	2	0	41	2
Total	Guatemala		129	9	0	0	7	1	136	10
Costa Rica			League		Cup		Cup		Total	
League	Club	Season	Apps	Goals	Apps	Goals	Apps	Goals	Apps	Goals
Costa Rican FPD	Saprissa	2014-2015	14	0	3	2	4	0	21	2
Total	Costa Rica		14	0	3	2	4	0	21	2

=== International goals ===
Scores and results list Guatemala's goal tally first.

Goal	Date	Venue	Opponent	Score	Result	Competition
1	25 March 2016	Estadio Mateo Flores, Guatemala City, Guatemala	United States	1–0	2–0	2018 FIFA World Cup qualification
2	7 September 2016	Estadio Mateo Flores, Guatemala City, Guatemala	Saint Vincent and the Grenadines	1–0	9–3	2018 FIFA World Cup qualification

== Honours ==
Comunicaciones

- Liga Guate: Apertura 2009, Clausura 2011, Apertura 2011, Clausura 2013, Apertura 2013, Clausura 2014, Apertura 2014, Clausura 2015, 2022 Clausura, 2023 Apertura
- CONCACAF League: 2021

Saprissa

- Liga FPD: Apertura 2014
