= Nicolás Royón =

Uruguayan footballer (born 1991)

Personal information
- Full name: Pablo Nicolás Royón Silvera
- Date of birth: 28 January 1991 (age 35)
- Place of birth: Las Piedras, Uruguay
- Height: 1.75 m (5 ft 9 in)
- Position: Forward

Team information
- Current team: Montevideo Wanderers
- Number: 15

Senior career*
Years	Team	Apps	(Gls)
2011–2013	Liverpool	23	(5)
2013–2014	Fénix	11	(3)
2014	Sud América	14	(9)
2014	Atlético Rafaela	14	(1)
2015	Olimpo de Bahía Blanca	11	(1)
2015–2016	Sud América	25	(7)
2016–2017	Liverpool	49	(12)
2018	Deportes Iquique	15	(3)
2018–2019	Patronato	10	(0)
2019	Nacional Potosí	16	(6)
2019	Racing Club	20	(3)
2020	Nacional Potosí	19	(5)
2021	Comunicaciones	16	(4)
2021	Cusco	10	(0)
2022	Ayacucho	28	(5)
2023	La Luz	20	(4)
2023–2024	Marathón	16	(5)
2024	Rampla Juniors	17	(4)
2024–	Montevideo Wanderers	4	(2)
- * Club domestic league appearances and goals as of 7 September 2024

Pablo Nicolás Royón Silvera (born 28 January 1991) is a Uruguayan professional footballer who plays as a forward for Liga AUF club Montevideo Wanderers.

== Club career ==
=== Comunicaciones ===
On 6 February 2021, Comunicaciones announced the official signing of Royón.
