= Adrián de Lemos =

Costa Rican footballer (born 1982)

Personal information
- Full name: Adrián de Lemos Calderón
- Date of birth: October 13, 1982 (age 44)
- Place of birth: Goicoechea, Costa Rica
- Height: 1.86 m (6 ft 1 in)
- Position: Goalkeeper

Senior career*
Years	Team	Apps	(Gls)
2002–2004	Herediano		(0)
2005–2006	→ Brujas (loan)	43	(0)
2006–2010	Herediano	63	(0)
2010–2012	Pérez Zeledón	75	(0)
2013–2014	Saprissa	17	(0)
2014–2015	Santos de Guápiles	44	(0)
2015–2017	Herediano	10	(0)
2017	→ Cartaginés (loan)	22	(0)
2017–2019	Antigua	73	(0)
2019–2025	Guastatoya	195	(0)

International career
2003–2010	Costa Rica	6	(0)
- * Club domestic league appearances and goals as of 8 February 2021 (UTC)

Adrián de Lemos Calderón (born 13 October 1982) is a Costa Rican professional former footballer who played as a goalkeeper.

== Club career ==
De Lemos made his professional debut for Herediano on 25 August 2002 against Santos de Guápiles. In January 2005 he moved to Brujas on loan in order to get more playing time and he duly returned to Herediano in summer 2006. In summer 2010 he joined Pérez Zeledón.

In December 2012, Saprissa snapped him up ahead of the 2013 clausura only to lose him a year later to Santos de Guápiles.

=== Antigua ===
De Lemos joined Antigua in the summer 2017.

=== Guastatoya ===
Two years later, he joined Deportivo Guastatoya ahead of the 2019/20 season.

== International career ==
De Lemos made his debut for Costa Rica in an October 2003 friendly match against South Africa and earned a total of 6 caps, scoring no goals. He missed out through a knee injury on the 2004 Summer Olympics and was part of the Costa Rica preliminary squad for the 2006 World Cup.

His final international was a September 2010 friendly match against Panama.

== Honours ==
Saprissa

- Costa Rican Cup: 2013

Herediano

- Primera División: 2015 Verano

Antigua

- Liga Nacional de Guatemala: Apertura 2017, Clausura 2019

Guastatoya

- Liga Nacional de Guatemala: Apertura 2020
