= Alexander Robinson (Costa Rican footballer) =

Costa Rican footballer (born 1988)

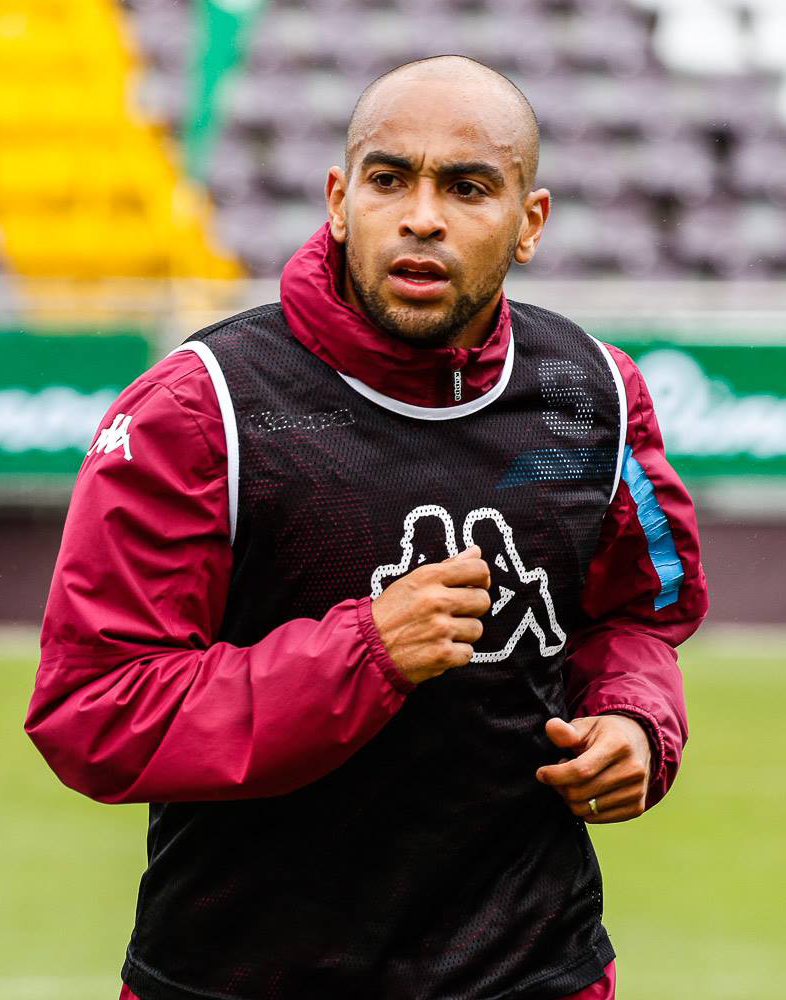
- Robinson with Saprissa in 2018

Personal information
- Full name: Alexander Robinson Delgado
- Date of birth: 21 November 1988 (age 37)
- Place of birth: San José, Costa Rica
- Height: 1.78 m (5 ft 10 in)
- Position: Centre-back

Team information
- Current team: Antigua
- Number: 32

Youth career
- 1995–2008: Saprissa

Senior career*
Years	Team	Apps	(Gls)
2008–2014	Saprissa	133	(12)
2014	Juventude	8	(0)
2014	Saprissa	17	(1)
2015–2016	Antigua	23	(1)
2017	Grecia	14	(0)
2018–2021	Saprissa	11	(0)
2021–2022	Comunicaciones	29	(0)
2022–	Antigua	10	(0)
- * Club domestic league appearances and goals as of 11 March 2018

Alexander Robinson Delgado (born 21 November 1988) is a Costa Rican professional footballer who plays as a centre-back for Liga Nacional club Antigua.

== Club career ==
Born in Tibás canton, San José Province, Robinson played youth football with Deportivo Saprissa, and made his debut with the senior team in 2008. The central defender suffered serious injuries in an automobile accident in 2010, but returned to captain the side. Robinson was originally left out of Saprissa's first team under new manager Daniel Casas, but would return in late 2012, scoring twice in a match against arch-rivals Alajuelense.

On 20 December 2013, he moved abroad for the first time of his career, signing with Brazilian third division side Esporte Clube Juventude. He returned to Saprissa in summer 2014.

== Honours ==
Saprissa

- Liga FPD: Clausura 2008, Apertura 2010, Clausura 2014, Clausura 2018, Clausura 2020

Antigua

- Liga Nacional de Guatemala: Apertura 2016

Comunicaciones

- CONCACAF League: 2021
