= Júnior Lacayo =

Honduran footballer (born 1995)

Personal information
- Full name: Júnior Alberto Lacayo Rochez
- Date of birth: 19 August 1995 (age 31)
- Place of birth: La Ceiba, Honduras
- Height: 1.63 m (5 ft 4 in)
- Position: Striker

Team information
- Current team: Marathón
- Number: 18

Senior career*
Years	Team	Apps	(Gls)
2012–2013	Victoria	22	(9)
2013–2017	Santos Laguna II	0	(0)
2015–2016	→ Victoria (loan)	15	(1)
2016–2017	→ Tampico Madero (loan)	9	(0)
2017–2018	Marathón	37	(10)
2018–2020	Olimpia	45	(6)
2021–2022	Comunicaciones	41	(8)
2022	Real España	32	(7)
2023–	Marathón	17	(0)

International career^{‡}
2022–	Honduras	3	(0)
- * Club domestic league appearances and goals as of 23:52, 12 May 2023 (UTC) ‡ National team caps and goals as of 07:01, 25 March 2022 (UTC)

Junior Alberto Lacayo Rochez (born 19 August 1995) is a Honduran professional footballer who plays as a striker for Marathón and the Honduras national team

== Club career ==
=== Club Deportivo Victoria ===
At the age of 16, Lacayo made his professional debut on 29 July 2012, against Motagua as a substitute for Rubén Licona. He was regarded by some people as heir to legendary Honduran striker Milton Tyson Núñez. In May 2013 Lacayo started a trial period with English Premier League side, West Ham United. In total, Lacayo scored nine goals in 23 appearances for Victoria.

== International career ==
At the age of 17, Lacayo was called up by Luis Fernando Suárez to play against Panama and Canada in the FIFA World Cup qualifiers but did not play either games.

In 2013, Lacayo was called up again to play in the 2013 Copa Centroamericana and in the Central American Games but did not play either tournaments.

Lacayo was one of 20 players Honduras called up for the 2015 CONCACAF U-20 Championship.

== Honours ==
Comunicaciones

- CONCACAF League: 2021
