= Andrés Lezcano =

Professional footballer (born 1990)

Personal information
- Full name: Rafael Andrés Lezcano Montero
- Date of birth: 5 May 1990 (age 36)
- Place of birth: Guápiles, Costa Rica
- Height: 1.72 m (5 ft 8 in)
- Position: Forward

Team information
- Current team: Mixco
- Number: 7

Senior career*
Years	Team	Apps	(Gls)
2008–2010	Herediano	4	(0)
2010–2015	Cartaginés	138	(26)
2015–2016	Alajuelense	39	(9)
2016–2017	Pérez Zeledón	23	(5)
2017	Carchá	16	(1)
2017–2018	Malacateco	38	(9)
2018–2020	Antigua	60	(15)
2020–2024	Comunicaciones	188	(36)
2024-	Mixco	0	(0)

International career^{‡}
2022–	Guatemala	10	(0)
- * Club domestic league appearances and goals as of 19:59, 21 May 2023 (UTC) ‡ National team caps and goals as of 19:59, 19 November 2022 (UTC)

Rafael Andrés Lezcano Montero (born 5 May 1990) is a professional footballer who plays as a forward for Liga Nacional club Mixco. Born in Costa Rica, he plays for the Guatemala national team.

== Club career ==
Lezcano began his playing career in Costa Rica with Herediano in the Liga FPD in 2008, before moving to Cartaginés from 2010 to 2015. He had stints with the other Costa Rican clubs Alajuelense and Pérez Zeledón before moving to Guatemala in 2017 with Deportivo Carchá. He had spells with Malacateco and Antigua, before transferring to Comunicaciones in 2020. He helped Comunicaciones win the 2021 CONCACAF League.

== International career ==
Born in Costa Rica, Lezcano was naturalized as a Guatemalan citizen after 5 years of residency and became available for the Guatemala national team. He debuted for Guatemala in a friendly 1–0 win over Cuba on 24 March 2022.

== Honours ==
Cartaginés

- Costa Rican Cup: 2014

Antigua

- Liga Nacional de Guatemala: Clausura 2019

Comunicaciones

- CONCACAF League: 2021
- Liga Nacional de Guatemala: Clausura 2022, Apertura 2023
