= Juan Luis Anangonó =

Ecuadorian footballer (born 1989)

Personal information
- Full name: Juan Luis Anangonó León
- Date of birth: 13 April 1989 (age 37)
- Place of birth: Ibarra, Ecuador
- Height: 1.87 m (6 ft 2 in)
- Position: Forward

Team information
- Current team: Leones F.C.

Youth career
- 2006–2010: Barcelona SC

Senior career*
Years	Team	Apps	(Gls)
2007–2010	Barcelona SC	48	(8)
2008	→ Guayaquil City	7	(6)
2011–2013	El Nacional	74	(30)
2012–2013	→ Argentinos Juniors (loan)	32	(5)
2013–2014	Chicago Fire	30	(6)
2014	→ L.D.U. Quito (loan)	25	(11)
2015–2016	Leones Negros	49	(14)
2016–2019	L.D.U. Quito	104	(34)
2019–2020	Beijing BSU	11	(4)
2020	River Plate Asunción	3	(0)
2021	Blooming	6	(1)
2021–2022	Comunicaciones	46	(12)
2022–2023	L.D.U. Quito	15	(3)
2023–2024	Comunicaciones	35	(15)
2024–2025	Marathón	1	(0)

International career^{‡}
2009	Ecuador U20	3	(1)
2012–2017	Ecuador	3	(1)
- * Club domestic league appearances and goals as of 29 July 2024 ‡ National team caps and goals as of 26 July 2017

Juan Luis Anangonó (born 13 April 1989) is an Ecuadorian professional footballer who plays a striker who currently plays for Ecuadorian Serie A club Leones F.C..

== Club career ==
=== Barcelona SC ===
His professional debut came in a 1–0 defeat against Universidad Católica, on 16 February 2008. He would finish his debut season with 10 games played, and 0 goals scored. He would continue his scoreless run into the 2009 season. His first career goal would come in a 1–0 win over Olmedo on 28 February 2010. He finishes the season with 8 goals in 28 league matches. After an unpromising start he was sent to play for El Nacional.

=== El Nacional ===
==== 2011 season ====
Juan's debut match for El Nacional was on a 2–1 loss against L.D.U. Loja on 29 January. His first goal with El Nacional came on February 20, in a 1–0 win over Imbabura. He played 45 league matches and scored 22 goals during the remainder of the 2011 season, including an away goal against L.D.U. Quito which qualified El Nacional for the qualifying rounds of the 2012 Copa Libertadores.

==== 2012 season ====
His first goal of the 2012 season came on 23 May, on a 3–1 win against Macara. After scoring 8 goals in 28 matches, it was reported that he would be sold to Italian side Chievo Verona. The deal failed to fall through in time, so he was loaned to Argentine Primera A giants Argentinos Juniors.

=== Argentinos Juniors ===
He was loaned to Argentinos Juniors for 1 season due to the Chievo Verona deal not being completed in time. Though it has been reported that El Nacional still wished to deal with the Italian club by the January Transfer Window. Anangono made his debut in a 1–1 home draw against Boca Juniors, coming in as a substitute, and nearly scoring the winning goal. He made his second appearance in the club's derby versus All Boys, scoring the winning goal at the 88th minute, in a 1–0 away win. His next goal came in a thrilling 5–3 loss to Atlético de Rafaela, Anangono set up the first 2 goals and scored the 3rd goal.

=== Chicago Fire ===
Anangonó signed with Major League Soccer club Chicago Fire on 23 July 2013 as a designated player. Despite some eventual success including a diving header versus reigning Western Conference Champions Real Salt Lake, Anangono failed to make a lasting impact on the club. He lost his starting spot to Quincy Amarikwa and failed to regain it in the remainder of his tenure in Chicago.

=== LDU Quito ===
On 2 July 2014, it was confirmed that Anangonó would be returning to his native Ecuador to play for L.D.U. Quito on loan for a year.

=== Beijing BSU ===
On 27 July 2019, Anangonó made the move to China League One side Beijing BSU.

== International career ==
Anangonó made his debut for the Ecuador national football team in an international friendly against Chile coming in the 85th minute as a substitute for Jefferson Montero. He was capped once again in a 2014 World Cup Qualifier match against Argentina. He came in at the 88th minute for Joao Rojas. Anangonó has not been called up in over a year.

== Career statistics ==
Statistics accurate as of match played 5 May 2024.

Appearances and goals by club, season and competition
Club	Season	League			National Cup		International		Total	
Club	Season	Division	!Apps	Goals	Apps	Goals	Apps	Goals	Apps	Goals
Barcelona SC	2007	Ecuadorian Serie A	1	0	—		—		1	0
Barcelona SC	2008	Ecuadorian Serie A	8	0	—		—		8	0
Barcelona SC	2009	Ecuadorian Serie A	11	0	—		—		11	0
Barcelona SC	2010	Ecuadorian Serie A	28	8	—		1	0	29	8
Barcelona SC	Total		48	8	—		1	0	49	8
Guayaquil City (loan)	2008	Ecuadorian Serie A	7	6	—		—		7	6
El Nacional	2011	Ecuadorian Serie A	45	21	—		—		45	21
El Nacional	2012	Ecuadorian Serie A	27	8	—		2	1	29	9
El Nacional	Total		72	29	—		2	1	74	30
Argentinos Juniors (loan)	2012–13	Argentine Primera División	32	5	—		—		32	5
Chicago Fire	2013	Major League Soccer	13	2	1	0	—		14	2
Chicago Fire	2014	Major League Soccer	15	2	1	2	—		16	4
Chicago Fire	Total		28	4	2	2	—		30	6
L.D.U. Quito (loan)	2014	Ecuadorian Serie A	25	11	—		—		25	11
Leones Negros U de G	2014–15	Liga MX	13	1	2	1	—		15	2
Leones Negros U de G	2015–16	Ascenso MX	29	12	5	0	—		34	12
Leones Negros U de G	Total		42	13	7	1	—		49	14
L.D.U. Quito	2016	Ecuadorian Serie A	15	3	—		—		15	3
L.D.U. Quito	2017	Ecuadorian Serie A	29	8	—		4	0	33	8
L.D.U. Quito	2018	Ecuadorian Serie A	35	16	—		5	3	40	19
L.D.U. Quito	2019	Ecuadorian Serie A	11	2	0	0	5	2	16	4
L.D.U. Quito	Total		90	29	—		14	5	104	34
Beijing BSU	2019	China League One	11	4	0	0	—		11	4
River Plate (Asunción)	2020	Paraguayan Primera División	3	0	—		—		3	0
Blooming	2021	Bolivian Primera División	6	1	—		—		6	1
Comunicaciones	2021–22	Liga Nacional de Guatemala	46	12	—		14	6	60	18
L.D.U. Quito	2022	Ecuadorian Serie A	14	3	—		—		14	3
L.D.U. Quito	2023	Ecuadorian Serie A	11	3	—		4	1	15	4
L.D.U. Quito	Total		25	6	—		4	1	29	7
Comunicaciones	2023–24	Liga Nacional de Guatemala	35	15	—		10	0	45	15
Career total			470	143	10	3	45	13	525	159

=== International goals ===
Scores and results list Ecuador's goal tally first.

#	Date	Venue	Opponent	Score	Result	Competition
1.	26 July 2017	Estadio George Capwell, Guayaquil, Ecuador	Trinidad and Tobago	1–0	3–1	Friendly

== Honours ==
LDU Quito

- Ecuadorian Serie A: 2018

Comunicaciones

- CONCACAF League: 2021
- Liga Nacional de Guatemala: Clausura 2022, Apertura 2023

Individual

- CONCACAF League Golden Ball: 2021
- CONCACAF League Golden Boot: 2021
