= CSD Carchá =

Association football club in Guatemala

Carchá
- Full name: Club Social y Deportivo Carchá
- Nicknames: Los Hombres Peces (The Fishmen); Los Peces Cenizos (The Ashen Fish)
- Short name: CSDC
- Founded: 1962; 63 years ago
- Ground: Estadio Juan Ramón Ponce
- Capacity: 4,000
- Chairman: Darío Cucul
- Manager: Marvin Ruano
- League: Liga Primera División
- 2010 Clausura Grupo B: 7th
Home colours	Away colours

Club Social y Deportivo Carchá (Spanish pronunciation: [klˈub soθjˈal ˈi dˌepoɾtˈiβo kaɾt͡ʃˈa]), is a Guatemalan professional football club based in San Pedro Carchá. They compete in the Liga Primera División, the second tier of Guatemalan football.

== History ==
The club was founded in 1962 and won promotion to the Liga Mayor B in 1974, entering the competition as Deportivo Carchá Jimmy Álvarez, named after their first manager. In 1992 they joined the Guatemalan second division and they finished champions in the 1997/1998 season to make their debut at the highest level of Guatemalan football, playing in the Liga Nacional de Guatemala in 1998/1999. They were relegated again after the 2000/2001 season and even went down further to the third tier of Guatemalan football.

Most recently they have again been playing in the Primera División Group "A" or "B". They are nicknamed Los Hombres Peces (the Fisherman).

== Players ==
=== Current squad ===
Note: Flags indicate national team as defined under FIFA eligibility rules; some limited exceptions apply. Players may hold more than one non-FIFA nationality.

No.	Pos.	Nation	Player
—	GK	GUA	Geysson Herrera
—	DF	GUA	Juan Carlos Casasola
—	MF	GUA	Donaldson Mendoza
—	MF	GUA	Ever López
—	MF	GUA	Luis Martínez
—	MF	GUA	Gerberth Bol
—	MF	GUA	Durbin Casasola
—	MF	GUA	Luis Rivera
—	MF	GUA	Edson Méndez
—	MF	GUA	Daniel Guay
—	MF	GUA	Geovani Pajares
—	MF	GUA	Víctor Guay
—	FW	GUA	Carlos Orellana
—	FW	GUA	Cristian Sequén
—	FW	GUA	José Rafael González

== List of coaches ==
- Jimmy Álvarez
- Gildardo Barrientos
- Rodolfo Amílcar Rivera
- Carlos Cloth
- Luis Jacobo Caballeros
- Abraham Chocooj
- Carlos Raúl Juárez
- Juan Carlos Alonzo
- Julián Trujillo
- Ramón Celaya
- Marco Antonio Matheu
- Luis "Ruso" Estrada
- Eduardo Santana
- Julio Gómez
- (Brazil) Carlos de Oliveira (2000–01)
- Arturo Cacao
- Haroldo Cordón
- (Brazil) Ariovaldo Guilherme
- (Guatemala) Alex Monterroso (2007–08)
