= F.C. Santa Lucía =

Association football club in Guatemala

Santa Lucía
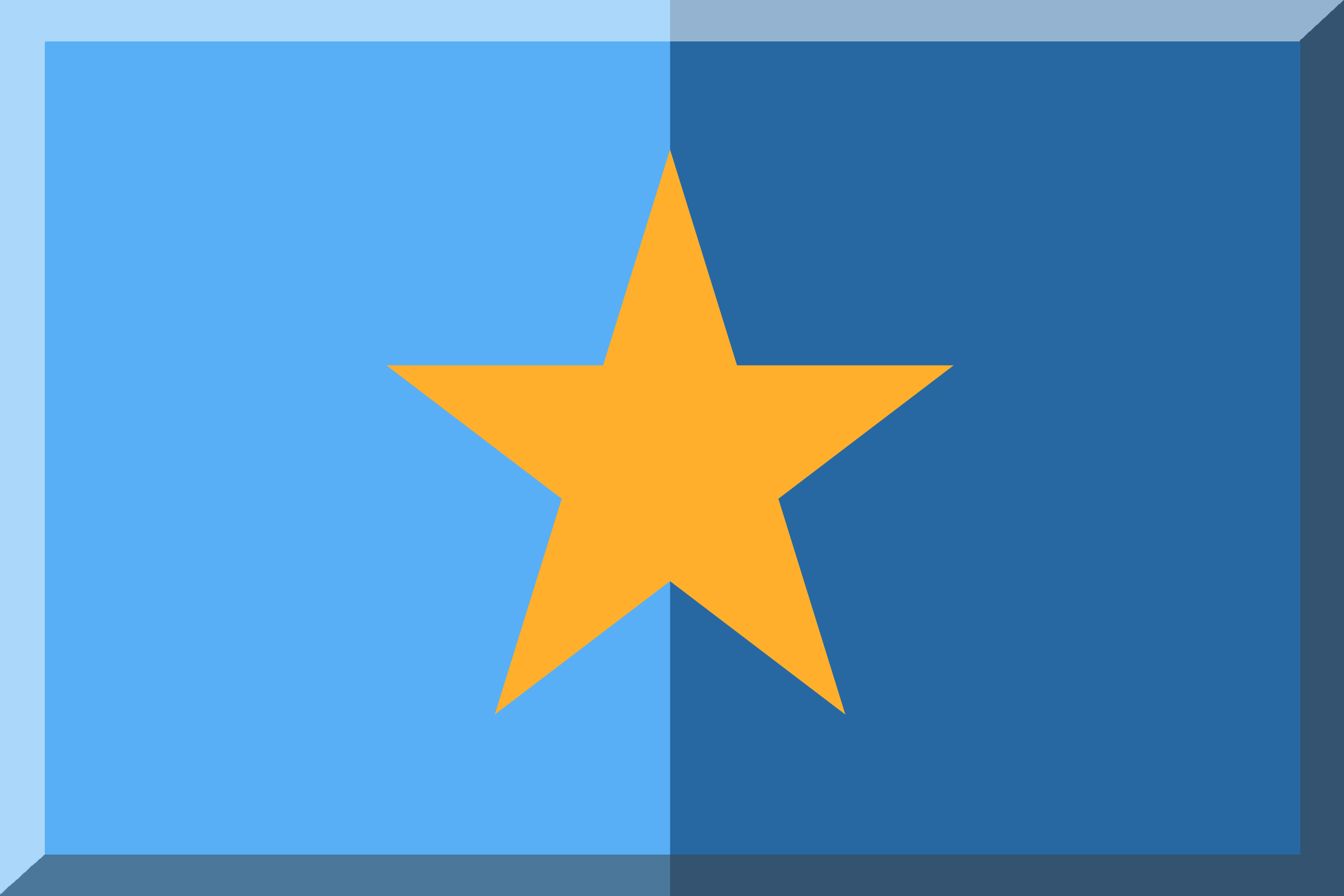
- Full name: Fútbol Club Santa Lucía Cotzumalguapa
- Nicknames: Los Jaguares (The Jaguars); Los Celestes (The Sky Blues); Los Azucareros (The Sugar Mills); Los Lucianos (The Lucians); Los Cañeros (The Sugarcanes)
- Short name: Santa
- Founded: 1991; 34 years ago (as Azucareros de Cotzumalguapa)
- Ground: Estadio Municipal Santa Lucía Cotzumalguapa
- Capacity: 9,000
- Manager: Ronald Gómez
- League: Liga Primera División
- Apertura 2023: Group A 8th

Fútbol Club Santa Lucía Cotzumalguapa, commonly referred to as Santa Lucía, is a Guatemalan professional football club based in Santa Lucía Cotzumalguapa, Guatemala, that competes in the Liga Primera División, the second tier of Guatemalan football.

Founded in 1991, the team plays its home matches at the Estadio Municipal Santa Lucía.

== History ==
=== Titles and promotions in inferior leagues ===
In 2015, Santa Lucía earned promotion from the Guatemalan third division to the Guatemalan second division. In 2018, they earned promotion to the Guatemalan top flight.

=== First title in the Liga Nacional de Guatemala ===
In the Clausura 2021, which was played without spectators due to the COVID-19 pandemic, the format changed, and they finished second in Group A, advancing to the quarterfinals, where they eliminated Cobán Imperial with a 4–1 aggregate score. In the semifinals, things were different, as they faced not Comunicaciones, but Guastatoya, the reigning champions, and defeated them 3–1 on aggregate. In the final, they did face the "Cremas," and in the first leg, they surprisingly won 4–0, giving them a significant advantage for the second leg. In the second leg, played on May 23, the white team was winning 5–0 in the 90th minute, and it was at that moment that they tied the aggregate score at 5–5. Two minutes later, they scored their second goal, making the final aggregate score 5–6, thus securing their first Liga Nacional title.

== Honours ==
=== Domestic honours ===
==== Leagues ====
- Liga Nacional de Guatemala
  - Champions (1): 2021 Clausura

== List of coaches ==
- (Guatemala) Francisco Melgar (May 2019–)
- (Guatemala) Douglas Zamora (-January 2020)
- (Argentina) Pablo Centrone (January 2020–)
- (Guatemala) Mario Acevedo (December 2020 – December 2021)
- (Guatemala) Juan Manuel Funes Fernández (December 2021 – February 2022)
- (Argentina) Matías Tatangelo (February 2022 – September 2022)
- (Spain) Juan Cortés Diéguez (September 2022 – December 2022)
- (Costa Rica) Ronald Gómez (January 2023-2023)
- (Argentina) Roberto Gamarra ( – February 2024)
- (Guatemala) Alberto "Albertico" Salguero (December 2024–Present)
