= CD Guastatoya =

Association football club in Guatemala

Guastatoya
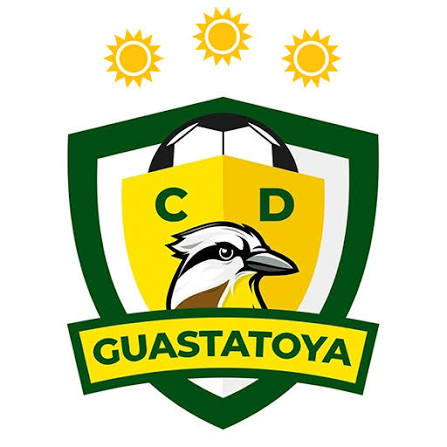
- Full name: Club Deportivo Guastatoya
- Nicknames: Los Pechos Amarillo (The Yellow Chests); Auriverdes (Golden Greens)
- Short name: Guasta
- Founded: 1990; 36 years ago
- Ground: Estadio David Cordón Hichos
- Capacity: 3,100
- Chairman: Edwin Rodriguez
- Manager: Dwight Pezzarossi
- League: Liga Guate
- Apertura 2024: 10th
| Home colours | Away colours | Third colours |

Club Deportivo Guastatoya (Spanish pronunciation: [klˈub dˌepoɾtˈiβo ɡwˌastatˈojja]), is a Guatemalan professional football club based in Guastatoya, El Progreso Department. They compete in the Liga Bantrab, the top tier of Guatemalan football.

== History ==
The team had its origins under the name of Guastatoya Futbol Club, which was founded in 1990, however, the club was refounded as C.D. Guastatoya in 2005 in the city of Guastatoya in the Department of El Progreso. They have been in the Guatemalan First Division and in the amateur leagues of the country, that until in the 2013–14 season they managed to ascend to the Liga Nacional for the first time in its history, despite not being the champion of the Guatemalan First Division. They have a rivalry with local club Sanarate and Antigua.

== Stadium ==
They play at the Estadio David Cordón Hichos, which holds a capacity of 3,100.

== Honours ==
- Liga Nacional de Guatemala and predecessors
  - Champions (3): Clausura 2018, Apertura 2018, Apertura 2020
- Campeón de Campeones
  - Champions (1): 2019

== Performance in international competitions ==
- CONCACAF Champions League

2019 - Round of 16

- CONCACAF League

2019 - Round of 16

- CONCACAF League

2021 - Semifinals

- CONCACAF Champions League

2022 - Round of 16

== Players ==
=== Current squad ===
As of 24 March, 2026 Note: Flags indicate national team as defined under FIFA eligibility rules; some limited exceptions apply. Players may hold more than one non-FIFA nationality.

| No. | Pos. | Nation | Player |
|---|---|---|---|
| 1 | GK | PAR | Rubén Escobar |
| 5 | MF | GUA | Joshua Ubico |
| 6 | MF | GUA | Jonathan Estrada |
| 7 | MF | GUA | Herberth Morales |
| 8 | MF | GUA | Yordi Aguilar |
| 9 | FW | ARG | Santiago Gómez |
| 10 | MF | GUA | Marlon Sequén |
| 11 | FW | CRC | Keyshwen Arboine |
| 12 | DF | GUA | Keyner Agustín |
| 15 | MF | GUA | Ariel Lon |
| 17 | MF | MEX | José Almanza |
| 20 | MF | PAR | Kevin Fernández |

| No. | Pos. | Nation | Player |
|---|---|---|---|
| 21 | DF | GUA | Bernabé Hernández |
| 22 | FW | PAR | Víctor Avalos |
| 23 | DF | GUA | Víctor Armas |
| 25 | MF | GUA | Denilson Sánchez |
| 27 | FW | GUA | Nelso García |
| 29 | MF | GUA | Anderson Molina |
| 30 | DF | GUA | Samuel Garrido |
| 35 | FW | GUA | Gilder Cruz |
| 44 | DF | ARG | Emanuel Yori |
| 70 | MF | GUA | Yordin Hernández |
| 88 | MF | GUA | Carlos Alvarado |
| 99 | GK | GUA | Jordy Cifuentes |

== Personnel ==
=== Coaching staff ===
As of June 2025

| Position | Staff |
|---|---|
| Coach | (Uruguay) Ariel Sena (*) |
| Assistant manager | (Argentina) Mike Leonardo (*) |
| Reserve manager | (El Salvador) TBD (*) |
| Goalkeeper Coach | (El Salvador) Victor Sololinde (*) |
| Under 17 Manager | (El Salvador) TBD (*) |
| Under 15 Manager | (El Salvador) TBD |
| Sporting director | (El Salvador) TBD (*) |
| Fitness Coach | (Colombia) Cesar Gimenez (*) |
| Team Doctor | (El Salvador) TBD (*) |
| Fitness Coach | (El Salvador) TBD (*) |
| Physiotherapy | (El Salvador) TBD (*) |
| Utility | (El Salvador) TBD (*) |

== Notable players ==
- Adrián de Lemos (246 games)

== Managerial history ==
Guastatoya has had 11 permanent managers since it first appointed Uruguayan Ariel Sena coach in 2010. The longest serving manager was Ariel Sena, who managed Guastatoya for five years from 2010 to December 2015. Ariel Sena won the club's first title, winning the Segunda División title in 2011, while Amarini Villatoro won the club's first Liga Nacional title in Apertura 2018 and their second Liga Nacional title in Clausura 2018. They then won their third Apertura title under Willy Coito Olivera in February 2021.

- (Uruguay) Ariel Sena (2010–2015)
- (Guatemala) Francisco Melgar (2015–2016)
- (Argentina) Roque Alfaro (2016)
- (Guatemala) Amarini Villatoro (2016–2019)
- (Guatemala) Fabricio Benitez (2019–2020)
- (Uruguay) Willy Coito Olivera (2020–2021)
- (Guatemala) Rafael Díaz (2021)
- (Mexico) Daniel Guzmán (2021)
- (Nicaragua) Mario Acevedo (2021–2023)
- (Mexico) Roberto Montoya (2023–2024)
- (Argentina) Iván Sopegno (2024)
- (Guatemala) Dwight Pezzarossi (2024–May 2025)
- (Uruguay) Ariel Sena (June 2025–August 2025)
- (Guatemala) Mike Leonardo Interim (August 2025)
- (Argentina) Pablo Centrone (September 2025–Present)
