= 2021 CONCACAF Gold Cup Group A =

Football competition

Group A of the 2021 CONCACAF Gold Cup took place from 10 to 18 July 2021 in Arlington's AT&T Stadium, Dallas' Cotton Bowl and Frisco's Toyota Stadium. The group consisted of El Salvador, Guatemala, defending champions Mexico, and Trinidad and Tobago. The top two teams, Mexico and El Salvador, advanced to the quarter-finals, while the other two teams were eliminated.

Originally, Curaçao would have played in this group. On 9 July 2021, Curaçao was removed as a participant due to close contacts with those tested positive to COVID-19 and replaced by Guatemala.

== Teams ==
Draw position	Team	Pot	Method of qualification	Date of qualification	Finals appearance only Gold Cup era (since 1991)	Last appearance	Previous best performance only Gold Cup era (since 1991)	CONCACAF Rankings		FIFA Rankings (May 2021)
Draw position	Team	Pot	Method of qualification	Date of qualification	Finals appearance only Gold Cup era (since 1991)	Last appearance	Previous best performance only Gold Cup era (since 1991)	August 2020 (Note: The CONCACAF rankings of August 2020 were used for seeding for the final draw.)	July 2021 (Note: CONCACAF rankings at the start of the tournament (as of 1 July 2021).)	FIFA Rankings (May 2021)
A1	Mexico	1	CNL League A Group B 1st place	15 November 2019	16th	2019	Winners (1993, 1996, 1998, 2003, 2009, 2011, 2015, 2019)	1	1	11
A2	El Salvador	2	CNL League B Group B 1st place	16 November 2019	12th	2019	Quarter-finals (2002, 2003, 2011, 2013, 2017)	10	10	69
A3	~~Curaçao~~	3	CNL League A Group D 2nd place	17 November 2019	3rd	2019	Quarter-finals (2019)	13	12	76
A3	Guatemala	N/A	Next best-ranked team from GCQ	9 July 2021	11th	2015	Fourth place (1996)	9	8	127
A4	Trinidad and Tobago	4	GCQ winners	6 July 2021	11th	2019	Third place (2000)	12	13	103

== Standings ==
Pos	Team	Pld	W	D	L	GF	GA	GD	Pts	Qualification
1	Mexico	3	2	1	0	4	0	+4	7	Advance to knockout stage
2	El Salvador	3	2	0	1	4	1	+3	6	Advance to knockout stage
3	Trinidad and Tobago	3	0	2	1	1	3	−2	2	
4	Guatemala	3	0	1	2	1	6	−5	1	

Source: CONCACAF
Rules for classification: Group stage tiebreakers

In the quarter-finals:

- The winners of Group A, Mexico, advanced to play the runners-up of Group D, Honduras.
- The runners-up of Group A, El Salvador, advanced to play the winners of Group D, Qatar.

== Matches ==
=== Mexico vs Trinidad and Tobago ===
10 July 2021
22:30 (21:30 UTC−5)

Mexico	0–0	Trinidad and Tobago
	Report

AT&T Stadium, Arlington
Attendance: 41,229
Referee: Ricardo Montero (Costa Rica)

Mexico	Trinidad and Tobago

GK	1	Alfredo Talavera
RB	21	Luis Rodríguez
CB	2	Néstor Araujo
CB	3	Carlos Salcedo		(substituted off) 53'
LB	5	Osvaldo Rodríguez		(substituted off) 82'
CM	16	Héctor Herrera (c)
CM	4	Edson Álvarez	(yellow card) 11'
CM	14	Érick Gutiérrez		(substituted off) 46'
RF	17	Jesús Manuel Corona
CF	11	Rogelio Funes Mori
LF	22	Hirving Lozano		(substituted off) 18'
Substitutions:
FW	18	Efraín Álvarez		(substituted on) 18'
MF	10	Orbelín Pineda		(substituted on) 46'
MF	6	Jonathan dos Santos		(substituted on) 53'
MF	23	Jesús Gallardo		(substituted on) 82'
Head coach:
(Argentina) Gerardo Martino

GK	1	Marvin Phillip (c)
CB	2	Aubrey David
CB	4	Jelani Peters
CB	6	Radanfah Abu Bakr
RWB	16	Alvin Jones	(yellow card) 45+6'
LWB	19	Ross Russell		(substituted off) 46'
RM	3	Hashim Arcia		(substituted off) 46'
CM	17	Justin Garcia		(substituted off) 46'
CM	23	Jesse Williams		(substituted off) 65'
LM	18	Triston Hodge		(substituted off) 65'
CF	13	Reon Moore
Substitutions:
DF	8	Mekeil Williams		(substituted on) 46'
DF	11	Noah Powder		(substituted on) 46'
MF	10	Kevin Molino		(substituted on) 46'
DF	15	Neveal Hackshaw		(substituted on) 65'
FW	7	Ryan Telfer		(substituted on) 65'
Head coach:
Angus Eve

Man of the Match:
Marvin Phillip (Trinidad and Tobago)

Assistant referees:
Juan Carlos Mora (Costa Rica)
Roney Salinas (Honduras)
Fourth official:
Tristley Bassue (Saint Kitts and Nevis)
Video assistant referee:
David Gantar (Canada)
Assistant video assistant referee:
Daneon Parchment (Jamaica)

=== El Salvador vs Guatemala ===
11 July 2021
23:00 (22:00 UTC−5)

El Salvador	2–0	Guatemala
Roldán 81'; Rivas 90+6'	Report

Toyota Stadium, Frisco
Attendance: 8,494
Referee: Jair Marrufo (United States)

El Salvador	Guatemala

GK	1	Mario González
RB	21	Bryan Tamacas
CB	4	Eriq Zavaleta
CB	5	Ronald Gómez
LB	13	Alexander Larín
DM	6	Narciso Orellana
RM	8	Joshua Pérez		(substituted off) 80'
CM	7	Darwin Cerén		(substituted off) 64'
CM	12	Marvin Monterroza (c)		(substituted off) 90+2'
LM	11	Juan Carlos Portillo		(substituted off) 64'
CF	17	Jairo Henríquez		(substituted off) 90+2'
Substitutions:
MF	15	Alex Roldán		(substituted on) 64'
FW	23	Marvin Márquez		(substituted on) 64'
FW	14	Joaquín Rivas		(substituted on) 80'
MF	20	Isaac Portillo		(substituted on) 90+2'
FW	9	Walmer Martínez	(yellow card) 90+3'	(substituted on) 90+2'
Head coach:
(United States) Hugo Pérez

GK	1	Nicholas Hagen
CB	20	Gerardo Gordillo
CB	4	José Carlos Pinto (c)	(yellow card) 34'
CB	2	Moisés Hernández
RWB	13	Stheven Robles		(substituted off) 80'
LWB	22	José Morales	(yellow card) 32'	(substituted off) 68'
RM	11	Jairo Arreola		(substituted off) 58'
CM	16	Marco Domínguez
CM	23	Jorge Aparicio		(substituted off) 79'
LM	7	Marvin Ceballos		(substituted off) 69'
CF	17	Luis Martínez
Substitutions:
MF	18	Oscar Santis		(substituted on) 58'
MF	8	Luis de León		(substituted on) 68'
FW	19	Robin Betancourth		(substituted on) 69'
FW	14	Darwin Lom		(substituted on) 79'
MF	9	Yeltsin Álvarez		(substituted on) 80'
Head coach:
(Mexico) Rafael Loredo

Man of the Match:
Alex Roldán (El Salvador)

Assistant referees:
Frank Anderson (United States)
Kathryn Nesbitt (United States)
Fourth official:
Keylor Herrera (Costa Rica)
Video assistant referee:
Tim Ford (United States)
Assistant video assistant referee:
Allen Chapman (United States)

=== Trinidad and Tobago vs El Salvador ===
14 July 2021
19:30 (18:30 UTC−5)

Trinidad and Tobago	0–2	El Salvador
	Report	Henríquez 30'; Martínez 90+1'

Toyota Stadium, Frisco
Attendance: 5,494
Referee: Selvin Brown (Honduras)

Trinidad and Tobago	El Salvador

GK	21	Nicklas Frenderup
CB	8	Mekeil Williams
CB	2	Aubrey David
CB	4	Jelani Peters		(substituted off) 46'
RWB	16	Alvin Jones
LWB	18	Triston Hodge	(yellow card) 3'	(substituted off) 15'
CM	20	Duane Muckette		(substituted off) 46'
CM	15	Neveal Hackshaw
CM	11	Noah Powder
CF	10	Kevin Molino (c)
CF	7	Ryan Telfer		(substituted off) 77'
Substitutions:
MF	14	Andre Fortune II		(substituted on) 15'
MF	13	Reon Moore	(yellow card) 79'	(substituted on) 46'
FW	9	Marcus Joseph		(substituted on) 46'
MF	3	Hashim Arcia		(substituted on) 77'
Head coach:
Angus Eve

GK	1	Mario González
RB	21	Bryan Tamacas		(substituted off) 89'
CB	4	Eriq Zavaleta
CB	5	Ronald Gómez
LB	13	Alexander Larín
RM	6	Narciso Orellana	(yellow card) 33'
CM	7	Darwin Cerén		(substituted off) 84'
CM	12	Marvin Monterroza (c)		(substituted off) 60'
LM	8	Joshua Pérez		(substituted off) 60'
CF	14	Joaquín Rivas		(substituted off) 83'
CF	17	Jairo Henríquez		(substituted off) 69'
Substitutions:
MF	10	Amando Moreno		(substituted on) 60'
FW	11	Juan Carlos Portillo		(substituted on) 60'
MF	15	Alex Roldán		(substituted on) 69'
FW	23	Marvin Márquez		(substituted on) 83'
MF	20	Isaac Portillo		(substituted on) 84'
FW	9	Walmer Martínez		(substituted on) 89'
Head coach:
(United States) Hugo Pérez

Man of the Match:
Jairo Henríquez (El Salvador)

Assistant referees:
Christian Ramírez (Honduras)
Roney Salinas (Honduras)
Fourth official:
Oshane Nation (Jamaica)
Video assistant referee:
Armando Villarreal (United States)
Assistant video assistant referee:
David Gantar (Canada)

=== Guatemala vs Mexico ===
14 July 2021
22:30 (21:30 UTC−5) (Note: The Guatemala vs Mexico match, originally scheduled at 21:30 CDT (UTC−5), was delayed until 22:30 CDT due to torrential rain in the area.)

Guatemala	0–3	Mexico
	Report	Funes Mori 29', 55'; Pineda 79'

Cotton Bowl, Dallas
Attendance: 15,391
Referee: Daneon Parchment (Jamaica)

Guatemala	Mexico

GK	1	Nicholas Hagen
CB	3	Kervin García		(substituted off) 60'
CB	4	José Carlos Pinto (c)
CB	20	Gerardo Gordillo
RWB	13	Stheven Robles		(substituted off) 82'
LWB	2	Moisés Hernández
CM	10	Alejandro Galindo		(substituted off) 60'
CM	18	Oscar Santis	(yellow card) 20'	(substituted off) 70'
CM	23	Jorge Aparicio
CF	14	Darwin Lom
CF	19	Robin Betancourth	(yellow card) 37'	(substituted off) 46'
Substitutions:
MF	7	Marvin Ceballos		(substituted on) 46'
MF	16	Marco Domínguez		(substituted on) 60'
DF	22	José Morales		(substituted on) 60'
MF	17	Luis Martínez		(substituted on) 70'
MF	8	Luis de León		(substituted on) 82'
Head coach:
(Mexico) Rafael Loredo

GK	1	Alfredo Talavera
RB	21	Luis Rodríguez
CB	2	Néstor Araujo	(substituted off) 83'
CB	3	Carlos Salcedo
LB	23	Jesús Gallardo
CM	16	Héctor Herrera (c)	(substituted off) 85'
CM	4	Edson Álvarez
CM	14	Érick Gutiérrez	(substituted off) 68'
RF	10	Orbelín Pineda
CF	11	Rogelio Funes Mori	(substituted off) 83'
LF	17	Jesús Manuel Corona	(substituted off) 84'
Substitutions:
MF	6	Jonathan dos Santos	(substituted on) 68'
DF	19	Gilberto Sepúlveda	(substituted on) 83'
FW	9	Alan Pulido	(substituted on) 83'
FW	18	Efraín Álvarez	(substituted on) 84'
FW	7	Érick Sánchez	(substituted on) 85'
Head coach:
(Argentina) Gerardo Martino

Man of the Match:
Rogelio Funes Mori (Mexico)

Assistant referees:
Logan Brown (United States)
Ojay Duhaney (Jamaica)
Fourth official:
Rubiel Vazquez (United States)
Video assistant referee:
Bakary Gassama (Gambia)
Assistant video assistant referee:
Drew Fischer (Canada)

=== Mexico vs El Salvador ===
18 July 2021
22:00 (21:00 UTC−5)

Mexico	1–0	El Salvador
L. Rodríguez 26'	Report

Cotton Bowl, Dallas
Attendance: 45,792
Referee: Saíd Martínez (Honduras)

Mexico	El Salvador

GK	1	Alfredo Talavera
RB	21	Luis Rodríguez	(yellow card) 70'
CB	3	Carlos Salcedo	(yellow card) 70'
CB	15	Héctor Moreno (c)
LB	23	Jesús Gallardo
CM	16	Héctor Herrera	(yellow card) 80'	(substituted off) 86'
CM	4	Edson Álvarez
CM	14	Érick Gutiérrez		(substituted off) 66'
RF	17	Jesús Manuel Corona
CF	11	Rogelio Funes Mori		(substituted off) 76'
LF	10	Orbelín Pineda		(substituted off) 86'
Substitutions:
MF	6	Jonathan dos Santos		(substituted on) 66'
FW	9	Alan Pulido	(yellow card) 78'	(substituted on) 76'
DF	5	Osvaldo Rodríguez		(substituted on) 86'
FW	7	Érick Sánchez		(substituted on) 86'
Head coach:
(Argentina) Gerardo Martino

GK	1	Mario González
RB	15	Alex Roldan
CB	4	Eriq Zavaleta
CB	5	Ronald Gómez
LB	13	Alexander Larín
RM	8	Joshua Pérez		(substituted off) 87'
CM	7	Darwin Cerén	(yellow card) 3'	(substituted off) 87'
CM	6	Narciso Orellana	(yellow card) 63'
LM	12	Marvin Monterroza (c)		(substituted off) 61'
CF	14	Joaquín Rivas
CF	17	Jairo Henríquez		(substituted off) 75'
Substitutions:
MF	10	Amando Moreno		(substituted on) 61'
FW	9	Walmer Martinez		(substituted on) 75'
FW	11	Juan Carlos Portillo		(substituted on) 87'
MF	20	Isaac Portillo		(substituted on) 87'
Head coach:
(United States) Hugo Pérez

Man of the Match:
Mario González (El Salvador)

Assistant referees:
Walter López (Honduras)
Christian Ramírez (Honduras)
Fourth official:
Reon Radix (Grenada)
Video assistant referee:
Allen Chapman (United States)
Assistant video assistant referee:
Selvin Brown (Honduras)

=== Guatemala vs Trinidad and Tobago ===
18 July 2021
22:00 (21:00 UTC−5)

Guatemala	1–1	Trinidad and Tobago
Gordillo 78'	Report	Moore 12'

Toyota Stadium, Frisco
Attendance: 5,476
Referee: Oshane Nation (Jamaica)

Guatemala	Trinidad and Tobago

GK	12	Kenderson Navarro
CB	3	Kervin García	(substituted off) 53'
CB	4	José Carlos Pinto (c)
CB	20	Gerardo Gordillo
RWB	13	Stheven Robles
LWB	2	Moisés Hernández
CM	18	Oscar Santis
CM	10	Alejandro Galindo	(substituted off) 46'
CM	23	Jorge Aparicio
CF	14	Darwin Lom	(substituted off) 82'
CF	7	Marvin Ceballos
Substitutions:
MF	5	Rudy Barrientos	(substituted on) 46'
MF	6	Óscar Castellanos	(substituted on) 53'
MF	17	Luis Martínez	(substituted on) 82'
Head coach:
(Mexico) Rafael Loredo

GK	1	Marvin Phillip (c)
RB	16	Alvin Jones
CB	2	Aubrey David	(yellow card) 89'
CB	8	Mekeil Williams
LB	18	Triston Hodge
RM	14	Andre Fortune II	(yellow card) 69'	(substituted off) 85'
CM	3	Hashim Arcia		(substituted off) 75'
CM	23	Jesse Williams		(substituted off) 75'
LM	11	Noah Powder
CF	9	Marcus Joseph		(substituted off) 67'
CF	13	Reon Moore		(substituted off) 86'
Substitutions:
MF	10	Kevin Molino		(substituted on) 67'
DF	17	Justin Garcia		(substituted on) 75'
FW	7	Ryan Telfer		(substituted on) 75'
DF	19	Ross Russell		(substituted on) 85'
FW	12	Isaiah Lee		(substituted on) 86'
Head coach:
Angus Eve

Man of the Match:
José Carlos Pinto (Guatemala)

Assistant referees:
Nicholas Anderson (Jamaica)
Iroots Appleton (Antigua and Barbuda)
Fourth official:
Pierre-Luc Lauzière (Canada)
Video assistant referee:
David Gantar (Canada)
Assistant video assistant referee:
Benjamín Pineda (Costa Rica)

== Discipline ==
Fair play points would have been used as a tiebreaker should the overall and head-to-head records of teams were tied. These were calculated based on yellow and red cards received in all group matches as follows:

- first yellow card: minus 1 point;
- indirect red card (second yellow card): minus 3 points;
- direct red card: minus 4 points;
- yellow card and direct red card: minus 5 points;

Only one of the above deductions was applied to a player in a single match.

Team	Match 1				Match 2				Match 3				Points
Team	Booked	(yellow card) (yellow-red card)	Sent off (straight red)	(yellow card) (red card)	Booked	(yellow card) (yellow-red card)	Sent off (straight red)	(yellow card) (red card)	Booked	(yellow card) (yellow-red card)	Sent off (straight red)	(yellow card) (red card)	Points
Guatemala	2				2								–4
El Salvador	1				1				2				–4
Mexico	1								4				–5
Trinidad and Tobago	1				2				2				–5
