= 2015–16 Liga Nacional de Guatemala =

63rd professional season of the top-flight football league in Guatemala

Liga Nacional de Guatemala
- Season: 2015–16
- Champions: Apertura: Antigua (1st title); Clausura: Suchitepéquez (2nd title)
- Relegated: USAC
- Champions League: Antigua; Suchitepéquez
- Top goalscorer: Carlos Kamiani Félix (19) (Apertura); Carlos Kamiani Félix (15) (Clausura)
- Biggest home win: Apertura: Suchitepéquez 6–0 Petapa (31 October 2015); Clausura: Malacateco 9–0 Cobán Imperial (8 May 2016)
- Biggest away win: Apertura: Marquense 0–3 Comunicaciones (13 September 2015) Antigua 1–4 USAC (30 September 2015) Petapa 1–4 Comunicaciones (4 October 2015) Malacateco 0–3 USAC (4 November 2015) Municipal 0–3 Guastatoya (8 November 2015); Clausura: USAC 2–6 Suchitepéquez (8 May 2016)
- Longest winning run: TBD (4)
- Longest unbeaten run: TBD (7)
- Longest winless run: TBD (10)
- Longest losing run: TBD (3)

The 2015–16 Liga Nacional de Guatemala was the 63rd professional season of the top-flight football league in Guatemala. The season was divided into two championships—the 2015 Apertura and the 2016 Clausura—each in an identical format and each contested by the same 12 teams.

== Format ==
The format for both championships are identical. Each championship will have two stages: a first stage and a playoff stage. The first stage of each championship is a double round-robin format. The teams that finish first and second in the standings will advance to the playoffs semifinals, while the teams that finish 3–6 will enter in the quarterfinals. The winner of each quarterfinal will advance to the semifinals. The winners of the semifinals will advance to the finals, which will determine the tournament champion.

== Teams ==
Locations of the 2014–15 Liga Nacional de Fútbol de Guatemala teams

Team	Home city	Stadium	Capacity
Antigua GFC	Antigua Guatemala, Sacatepequez	Pensativo	9,000
Cobán Imperial	Cobán, Guatemala	Estadio José Ángel Rossi	15, 000
Comunicaciones	Guatemala, Guatemala	Cementos Progreso	16,000
Guastatoya	Guastatoya, El Progreso	David Cordón Hichos	3,000
Malacateco	Malacatán, San Marcos	Santa Lucía	7,000
Marquense	San Marcos, Guatemala	Marquesa de la Ensenada	10,000
Mictlan	Mita, Jutiapa	Estadio La Asunción	3,000
Municipal	Guatemala, Guatemala	Manuel Felipe Carrera	7,500
Petapa	San Miguel Petapa, Guatemala	Julio Armando Cobar	7,000
Suchitepéquez	Mazatenango, Suchitepéquez	Carlos Salazar Hijo	12,000
USAC	Guatemala, Guatemala	Estadio Revolución	5,000
Xelajú MC	Quetzaltenango	Mario Camposeco	11,000

== Apertura ==
The 2015 Torneo Apertura began on 13 August 2015 and ended on 21 December 2015.

=== Personnel and sponsoring ===
Team	Chairman	Head coach	Kitmaker	Shirt sponsor
Antigua GFC	(Guatemala) Rafael Arreaga	(Argentina) Mauricio Tapia	TBD	Pegamex
Cobán Imperial	(Guatemala) Irasema Melendez	(Guatemala) Fabricio Chapa Benitez	Puma	TBD
Comunicaciones	(Mexico) Pedro Portilla	(Uruguay) William Coito Olivera	Puma	TBD
Guastatoya	(Guatemala)	(Uruguay) Ariel Sena	TBD	TBD
Malacateco	(Guatemala) TBD	(El Salvador) Nelson Mauricio Ancheta	TBD	TBD
Marquense	(Guatemala) TBD	(Guatemala) Juan Melgar	TBD	TBD
Mictlan	(Guatemala) TBD	(Guatemala) Sergio Guevara	TBD	TBD
Municipal	(Guatemala) Gerardo Villa	(Uruguay) Gustavo Machaín	TBD	DemosPro
Deportivo Petapa	(Guatemala) TBD	(Argentina) Pablo Centrone	TBD	TBD
Suchitepéquez	(Guatemala) TBD	(Guatemala) Walter Claverí	TBD	TBD
Universidad SC	(Guatemala) TBD	(Argentina) Roberto Gamarra	TBD	TBD
Xelajú	(Guatemala) TBD	(Costa Rica) Hernán Medford	RetoSports	TBD

=== Final phase ===
Qualifying stage
4	Guastatoya	3	0	3
5	Suchitepéquez	3	0	3
3	Comunicaciones	0	3	3
6	Petapa	0	0	0
3
6

Semifinals
1	Xelajú MC	0	2	2
3	Guastatoya	3	2	5
2	Antigua GFC	3	1	4
4	Comunicaciones	3	0	3

Finals
3	Guastatoya	2	0	2
2	Antigua GFC	1	2	3

=== Quarterfinals ===
Team 1	Agg.	Team 2	1st leg	2nd leg
Comunicaciones	QF1	Petapa	0–0	3–0
Guastatoya	QF2	Suchitepéquez	3–3	0–0

1. ^{†} Order of legs reversed.

==== First leg ====
December 3, 2015
13:00 UTC−6

Petapa	0–0	Comunicaciones

Estadio Julio Armando Cóbar, San Miguel, Petapa

December 4, 2015
12:30 UTC−6

Suchitepéquez	3–3	Guastatoya
Wilson Morales 15'; Ángel Prudencio 16'; Sergio Targua 72'		Víctor Solalinde 41'; Henry Suazo 48'; Edi Guerra 62'

Estadio Municipal Carlos Salazar Hijo, Mazatenango

==== Second leg ====
December 6, 2015
13:00 UTC−6

Comunicaciones	3–0	Petapa
Jose Contreras 10'; Rolando Blackburn 15'; Emiliano Lopez 72'		None'

Estadio Cementos Progreso, Guatemala City

Comunicaciones won 3–0 on aggregate.

December 7, 2015
20:30 UTC−6

Guastatoya	0–0	Suchitepéquez
None		None

Estadio David Cordón Hichos, Guastatoya

1–1 on aggregate. Guastatoya advanced on the away goal rule.

=== Semifinals ===
Team 1	Agg.	Team 2	1st leg	2nd leg
Xelajú MC	2–5	Guastatoya	0–3	2–2
Antigua GFC	4–3	Comunicaciones	3–3	1–0

==== First leg ====
December 10, 2015
8:00pm

Guastatoya	3–0	Xelajú MC
Tomas Castillo 10'; Wilson Pineda 70'; Nery Oliva 78'		None

Estadio David Cordón Hichos, Guastatoya

December 11, 2015

Comunicaciones	3–3	Antigua GFC
Emiliano Lopez 22'; Brayan Ordóñez 65'; Jairo Arreola 78'		Alex Diaz 32' & 76'; Manfred Russell 86'

Estadio Cementos Progreso, Guatemala city

==== Second leg ====
December 13, 2015
13:00

Xelajú MC	2–2	Guastatoya
Kevin Arriola pen 54'; Junior Andrade 79'		Tomás Castillo 33'; Fredy Orellana 91'

Estadio Mario Camposeco, Quetzaltenango

Guastatoya won 5–2 on aggregate.

December 14, 2015
4:30

Antigua GFC	1–0	Comunicaciones
Edgar Chinchilla 91'		None

Estadio Pensativo, Antigua

Antigua GFC won 4–3 on aggregate.

=== Finals ===
Team 1	Agg.	Team 2	1st leg	2nd leg
Guastatoya	2–3	Antigua GFC	2–1	0–2

==== First leg ====
December 18, 2015
8:00

Guastatoya	2–1	Antigua GFC
Juan Manuel Klug 16'; Edi Guerra 86'		Alejandro Díaz 49'

Estadio David Cordón Hichos, Guastatoya

==== Second leg ====
December 21, 2015

Antigua GFC	2–0	Guastatoya
Oscar Isaula 19'; Edgar Chinchilla 74'		None

Estadio Pensativo, Antigua

Antigua GFC won 3–2 on aggregate.

Apertura 2015 champions

1st title

== Managerial changes ==
=== Beginning of the season ===
Team	Outgoing manager	Manner of departure	Date of vacancy	Replaced by	Date of appointment
C.S.D. Municipal	(Argentina) Enzo Trossero	Sacked	2015	(Costa Rica) Mauricio Wright	2015
Deportivo Malacateco	(Honduras) Emilio Umanzor	Sacked	2015	(El Salvador) Nelson Mauricio Ancheta	2015
Marquense	(Uruguay) Carlos Washington Blanco	resigned	2015	(Guatemala) Juan Melgar	June 2015
Xelajú	(Honduras) Nahúm Espinoza		2015	(Costa Rica) Hernán Medford	June 2015

=== During the season ===
Team	Outgoing manager	Manner of departure	Date of vacancy	Replaced by	Date of appointment	Position in table
Universidad SC	(Argentina) Roberto Gamarra	Resigned	September 2015	(Argentina) Ramiro Cepeda	September 2015	12th (Apertura 2015)
Deportivo Malacateco	(El Salvador) Nelson Mauricio Ancheta	Resigned	November 2015	(Costa Rica) Ronald Gomez	November 2015	12th (Apertura 2015)
C.S.D. Municipal	(Costa Rica) Mauricio Wright	Sacked	November 2015	(Uruguay) Gustavo Machain	November 2015	7th (Apertura 2015)

=== Standings ===
Pos	Team	Pld	W	D	L	GF	GA	GD	Pts	Qualification
1	Xelajú MC	22	13	2	7	22	17	+5	41	Qualified to the Semifinals
2	Antigua GFC	22	11	5	6	28	19	+9	38	Qualified to the Semifinals
3	Comunicaciones	22	11	4	7	26	20	+6	37	Qualified to the Quarterfinals
4	Guastatoya	22	9	7	6	33	23	+10	34	Qualified to the Quarterfinals
5	Suchitepéquez	22	10	4	8	36	27	+9	34	Qualified to the Quarterfinals
6	Petapa	22	9	6	7	29	31	−2	33	Qualified to the Quarterfinals
7	Municipal	22	9	4	9	28	27	+1	31	
8	Marquense	22	8	5	9	22	28	−6	29	
9	Cobán Imperial	22	7	7	8	20	26	−6	28	
10	Mictlan	22	7	5	10	24	28	−4	26	
11	Universidad SC	22	4	6	12	31	36	−5	18	
12	Malacateco	22	4	5	13	24	41	−17	17	

Updated to match(es) played on 2015. Source:
Rules for classification: 1) points; 2) goal difference; 3) number of goals scored.

=== Results ===
Home \ Away	ANT	COB	COM	GUA	MAL	MAR	MIC	MUN	PET	SUC	USC	XEL
Antigua GFC		0–0	0–1	3–0	2–0	2–1	2–1	0–0	1–2	1–0	1–4	3–0
Cobán Imperial	0–0		2–1	2–2	1–0	1–0	1–0	1–0	2–3	3–3	2–2	0–0
Comunicaciones	1–0	2–1		0–0	2–1	2–2	2–1	1–0	0–2	0–1	1–0	2–0
Guastatoya	1–2	2–0	1–1		4–1	2–0	0–0	3–1	1–1	3–0	2–3	2–0
Malacateco	1–3	1–0	2–1	0–2		4–0	2–0	2–2	1–1	0–2	0–3	0–1
Marquense	1–1	0–1	0–3	2–0	2–2		3–1	2–1	0–0	2–0	2–1	1–0
Mictlan	1–2	3–0	2–0	2–2	2–2	0–0		1–0	1–0	2–0	1–1	3–1
Municipal	1–1	1–0	0–1	0–3	1–0	3–1	2–0		4–1	3–2	3–2	0–0
Petapa	0–2	1–0	1–4	0–0	4–1	0–2	3–0	3–0		1–1	2–1	2–1
Suchitepéquez	3–1	1–1	2–0	1–0	4–1	3–0	2–3	0–2	6–0		2–0	1–0
Universidad SC	0–1	1–2	1–1	2–3	2–2	0–1	2–0	2–4	2–0	2–2		1–2
Xelajú MC	1–0	3–0	1–0	2–0	2–1	1–0	1–0	1–0	2–1	2–0	1–0	

Updated to match(es) played on 2015. Source:
Legend: Blue = home team win; Yellow = draw; Red = away team win.

== List of foreign players in the league ==
This is a list of foreign players in Apertura 2015. The following players:

1. have played at least one apertura game for the respective club.
2. have not been capped for the Guatemala national football team on any level, independently from the birthplace

A new rule was introduced a few season ago, that clubs can only have five foreign players per club and can only add a new player if there is an injury or player/s is released.

Antigua GFC

- (Costa Rica) Mandred Russell
- (Costa Rica) Alexander Robinson
- (Trinidad and Tobago) Mekeil Williams
- (Jamaica) Akeem Priestley
- (Colombia) Justin Arboleda

Cobán Imperial

- (Guadeloupe) Victor Guay
- (Costa Rica) Argenis Fernandez
- (Uruguay) Mario Piñeyro
- (Uruguay) Jesus Darwin Ramirez

CSD Comunicaciones

- (Paraguay) Joel Benítez
- (Panama) Rolando Blackburn
- (Mexico) Agustín Herrera
- (Colombia) Jesús Jonathan Lozano
- (Argentina) Emiliano Lopez

Guastatoya

- (Paraguay) Victor Solalinde
- (Uruguay) Agustín Arigon
- (Uruguay) Álvaro García

' Deportivo Mictlan

- (Colombia) Juan Aguirre
- (Colombia) Marlon Negrete
- (Colombia) William Negrete
- (Panama) Ricardo Romero

Deportivo Malacateco

- (Colombia) Martin Edwin Garcia
- (Colombia) Nestor Asprilla
- (Mexico) Juan Carlos Meza
- (Mexico) Juan Carlos Silva
- (Mexico) Ricardo Rocha
- (Trinidad and Tobago) Jerrel Britto

(player released during the season)

Deportivo Marquense

- None

CSD Municipal

- (Costa Rica) Johnny Woodly Lambert
- (Costa Rica) Carlos Hernández
- (Costa Rica) Keilor Soto
- (El Salvador) Jaime Alas

Deportivo Petapa

- (Costa Rica) Minor Alvarez
- (Argentina) Lucas Trecarichi
- (Argentina) Juan Lovato
- (Uruguay) Adrian Apellaniz
- (Uruguay) Ignacio Flores

CD Suchitepéquez

- (Argentina) Ángel Prudencio
- (Belize) Shane Orio
- (Colombia) Jhon Cardona
- (Colombia) Jhon Jairo Córdoba
- (Honduras) Luis Lobo

Universidad SC

- (Argentina) Paulo Centurion
- (Colombia) Jonathan Rodríguez Cuenu
- (Honduras) Michel Rivera
- (Mexico) Carlos Kamiani Félix
- (Spain) Alexis Egea

Club Xelajú MC

- (Brazil) Juliano Rangel de Andrade
- (Colombia) Juan Baena
- (Panama) Brunet Hay

== Clausura ==
The 2016 Torneo Clausura began on 2016 and will end in 2016.

=== Personnel and sponsoring ===
Team	Chairman	Head coach	Kitmaker	Shirt sponsor
Antigua GFC	(Guatemala) Rafael Arreaga	(Argentina) Mauricio Tapia	TBD	Pegamex
Cobán Imperial	(Guatemala)	(Guatemala) Fabricio Chapa Benitez	Puma	TBD
Comunicaciones	(Mexico) Pedro Portilla	(Argentina) Iván Franco Sopegno	Puma	TBD
Guastatoya	(Guatemala)	(Guatemala) Francisco Melgar	TBD	TBD
Malacateco	(Guatemala) TBD	(Costa Rica) Rónald Gómez	TBD	TBD
Marquense	(Guatemala) TBD	(Argentina) Néstor Emilio Soria	TBD	TBD
Mictlan	(Guatemala) TBD	(Guatemala) Sergio Guevara	TBD	TBD
Municipal	(Guatemala) Gerardo Villa	(Uruguay) Gustavo Machain	TBD	TBD
Deportivo Petapa	(Guatemala) TBD	(Argentina) Pablo Centrone	TBD	TBD
Suchitepéquez	(Guatemala) TBD	(Guatemala) Walter Claverí	TBD	TBD
Universidad SC	(Guatemala) TBD	(Argentina) Ramiro Cepeda	TBD	TBD
Xelajú	(Guatemala) TBD	(Costa Rica) Hernán Medford	RetoSports	TBD

=== Final phase ===
Quarterfinals
4	Malacateco	0	3	3
5	Antigua GFC	2	0	2
3	Comunicaciones	3	1	4
6	Marquense	3	0	3
3
6

Semifinals
1	Suchitepéquez	2	2	4
4	Malacateco	1	0	1
2	CSD Municipal	0	2	2
3	Comunicaciones	1	1	2

Finals
1	Suchitepéquez	1	3	4
3	Comunicaciones	2	0	2

=== Quarterfinals ===
Team 1	Agg.	Team 2	1st leg	2nd leg
Deportivo Malacateco	3–0	Antigua GFC	0–2	–
Comunicaciones	4–3	Marquense	3–3	1–0

1. ^{†} Order of legs reversed.

==== First leg ====
May 12, 2016

Antigua GFC	2–0	Deportivo Malacateco
Alexis Matta 35'; Óscar Isaula 58'

Estadio Pensativo, Antigua Guatemala

May 12, 2016

Marquense	3–3	Comunicaciones
Kevin Elias Castellanos 17'; Fank De León 35', 61'		Rolando Blackburn 30'; Emiliano López 58', 85'

Estadio Marquesa de la Ensenada, San Marcos

==== Second leg ====
May 15, 2016

Comunicaciones	1–0	Marquense
Rolando Blackburn 72'

Estadio Mateo Flores, Guatemala City

Comunicaciones won 4–3 on aggregate.

May 15, 2016

Deportivo Malacateco	3–0	Antigua GFC

Estadio Santa Lucía, Malacatán

Malacateco won 3–2 on aggregate.

=== Semifinals ===
Team 1	Agg.	Team 2	1st leg	2nd leg
Suchitepéquez	–	Deportivo Malacateco	2–1	–
CSD Municipal	–	Comunicaciones	0–1	–

==== First leg ====
May 18, 2016
13:00 UTC−6

Deportivo Malacateco	1–2	Suchitepéquez
J. Valenzuela 71'		O. Salazar 9'; G. Esquivel 62'

Estadio Municipal Santa Lucía, Malacatán

May 19, 2016
21:00 UTC−6

Comunicaciones	1–0	CSD Municipal
Jairo Arreola 2'

Estadio Mateo Flores, Guatemala City

==== Second leg ====
May 21, 2016
20:00 UTC−6

Suchitepéquez	2–0	Deportivo Malacateco

Estadio Municipal Carlos Salazar Hijo, Mazatenango

Suchitepéquez won 4–1 on aggregate.

May 22, 2016
12:00 UTC−6

CSD Municipal	2–1	Comunicaciones

Estadio Mateo Flores, Guatemala City

Comunicaciones won 2–2 on aggregate.

=== Finals ===
Team 1	Agg.	Team 2	1st leg	2nd leg
Suchitepéquez	–	Comunicaciones	–	–

==== First leg ====
Comunicaciones	v	Suchitepéquez

Estadio Mateo Flores

==== Second leg ====
v

won – on aggregate.

== Playoffs ==
Quarterfinals
4	Malacateco	0	3	3
5	Antigua GFC	2	0	2
3	Comunicaciones	3	1	4
6	Marquense	3	0	3
3
6

Semifinals
1	Suchitepéquez	2	2	4
4	Malacateco	1	0	1
2	CSD Municipal	0	2	2
3	Comunicaciones	1	1	2

Finals
1	Suchitepéquez	1	3	4
3	Comunicaciones	2	0	2

=== Quarterfinals ===
Team 1	Agg.	Team 2	1st leg	2nd leg
Deportivo Malacateco	3–0	Antigua GFC	0–2	–
Comunicaciones	4–3	Marquense	3–3	1–0

1. ^{†} Order of legs reversed.

==== First leg ====
May 12, 2016

Antigua GFC	2–0	Deportivo Malacateco
Alexis Matta 35'; Óscar Isaula 58'

Estadio Pensativo, Antigua Guatemala

May 12, 2016

Marquense	3–3	Comunicaciones
Kevin Elias Castellanos 17'; Fank De León 35', 61'		Rolando Blackburn 30'; Emiliano López 58', 85'

Estadio Marquesa de la Ensenada, San Marcos

==== Second leg ====
May 15, 2016

Comunicaciones	1–0	Marquense
Rolando Blackburn 72'

Estadio Mateo Flores, Guatemala City

Comunicaciones won 4–3 on aggregate.

May 15, 2016

Deportivo Malacateco	3–0	Antigua GFC

Estadio Santa Lucía, Malacatán

Malacateco won 3–2 on aggregate.

=== Semifinals ===
Team 1	Agg.	Team 2	1st leg	2nd leg
Suchitepéquez	–	Deportivo Malacateco	2–1	–
CSD Municipal	–	Comunicaciones	0–1	–

==== First leg ====
May 18, 2016
13:00 UTC−6

Deportivo Malacateco	1–2	Suchitepéquez
J. Valenzuela 71'		O. Salazar 9'; G. Esquivel 62'

Estadio Municipal Santa Lucía, Malacatán

May 19, 2016
21:00 UTC−6

Comunicaciones	1–0	CSD Municipal
Jairo Arreola 2'

Estadio Mateo Flores, Guatemala City

==== Second leg ====
May 21, 2016
20:00 UTC−6

Suchitepéquez	2–0	Deportivo Malacateco

Estadio Municipal Carlos Salazar Hijo, Mazatenango

Suchitepéquez won 4–1 on aggregate.

May 22, 2016
12:00 UTC−6

CSD Municipal	2–1	Comunicaciones

Estadio Mateo Flores, Guatemala City

Comunicaciones won 2–2 on aggregate.

=== Finals ===
Team 1	Agg.	Team 2	1st leg	2nd leg
Suchitepéquez	–	Comunicaciones	–	–

==== First leg ====
Comunicaciones	v	Suchitepéquez

Estadio Mateo Flores

==== Second leg ====
v

won – on aggregate.

== Managerial changes ==
=== Beginning of the season ===
Team	Outgoing manager	Manner of departure	Date of vacancy	Replaced by	Date of appointment	Position in table
Comunicaciones	(Uruguay) William Coito Olivera	Sacked	December 2015	(Argentina) Ivan Sopengo	December 2015	th (Apertura 2015)
Guastatoya	(Uruguay) Ariel Sena	Resigned	December 2015	(Guatemala) Francisco Melgar	2015	th (Apertura 2015)
Deportivo Marquense	(Guatemala) Francisco Melgar	Resigned due to personal reason	December 2015	(Argentina) Néstor Emilio Soria	December 2015	th (Apertura 2015)
Suchitepéquez	(Guatemala) Walter Claverí	Resigned due to become head of the national team	January 2016	(Argentina) Douglas Zamora	January 2016	th (Apertura 2015)

=== During the season ===
Team	Outgoing manager	Manner of departure	Date of vacancy	Replaced by	Date of appointment	Position in table
Cobán Imperial	(Guatemala) Fabricio Chapa Benitez	Sacked	2016	(Argentina) Héctor Julián Trujillo	2016	th (Clausura 2016)
Guastatoya	(Guatemala) Francisco Melgar	Sacked	2016	(Guatemala) Roque Alfaro	2016	th (Apertura 2016)
Xelajú	(Costa Rica) Hernán Medford	Resigned	2016	(Uruguay) Carlos Jurado	2016	th (Apertura 2016)

=== Standings ===
Pos	Team	Pld	W	D	L	GF	GA	GD	Pts	Qualification
1	Suchitepéquez	22	12	3	7	36	23	+13	39	Qualified to the Semifinals
2	Municipal	22	9	9	4	29	21	+8	36	Qualified to the Semifinals
3	Comunicaciones	22	9	5	8	32	27	+5	32	Qualified to the Quarterfinals
4	Malacateco	22	9	4	9	35	24	+11	31	Qualified to the Quarterfinals
5	Antigua GFC	22	8	7	7	27	23	+4	31	Qualified to the Quarterfinals
6	Marquense	22	8	7	7	30	29	+1	31	Qualified to the Quarterfinals
7	Guastatoya	22	10	1	11	26	28	−2	31	
8	Mictlan	22	8	6	8	21	28	−7	30	
9	Universidad SC	22	8	5	9	32	29	+3	29	
10	Xelajú MC	22	5	9	8	19	25	−6	24	
11	Petapa	22	5	8	9	33	40	−7	23	
12	Cobán Imperial	22	5	8	9	17	40	−23	23	

Updated to match(es) played on 8 May 2016. Source: Soccerway
Rules for classification: 1) points; 2) goal difference; 3) number of goals scored.

=== Results ===
Home \ Away	ANT	COB	COM	GUA	MAL	MAR	MIC	MUN	PET	SUC	USC	XEL
Antigua GFC		0–0	1–3	3–0	1–1	2–4	2–1	2–0	4–1	0–1	1–0	0–0
Cobán Imperial	1–1		1–3	0–0	3–2	2–1	1–0	0–1	3–2	2–1	2–2	0–0
Comunicaciones	2–1	4–0		1–2	1–0	2–2	4–0	1–2	1–1	1–2	0–4	1–0
Guastatoya	1–0	3–0	0–1		2–0	3–4	2–0	2–0	3–1	1–0	3–1	2–0
Malacateco	2–1	9–0	1–1	1–0		1–1	3–0	1–0	3–2	4–1	2–0	2–0
Marquense	1–2	1–1	1–0	2–0	2–1		1–0	1–0	1–0	1–1	2–4	2–2
Mictlan	0–0	1–0	2–0	2–1	1–0	0–0		3–3	2–2	1–0	1–0	3–2
Municipal	0–0	0–0	2–2	1–0	1–0	1–0	1–1		8–2	3–2	1–1	2–1
Petapa	1–1	1–1	1–1	6–0	1–0	2–1	3–1	0–0		2–1	2–3	2–2
Suchitepéquez	0–1	3–0	2–1	2–1	4–1	3–1	2–0	0–0	2–0		1–0	1–1
Universidad SC	3–1	4–0	1–2	2–0	2–1	0–0	0–1	1–2	0–0	2–6		0–0
Xelajú MC	1–3	1–0	1–0	1–0	0–0	2–1	1–1	1–1	2–1	0–1	1–2	

Updated to match(es) played on 8 May 2016. Source:
Legend: Blue = home team win; Yellow = draw; Red = away team win.

== Aggregate table ==
Pos	Team	Pld	W	D	L	GF	GA	GD	Pts	Qualification
1	Suchitepéquez (C, Q)	44	22	7	15	72	50	+22	73	2016–17 CONCACAF Champions League group stage
2	Antigua GFC (C, Q)	44	19	12	13	55	42	+13	69	2016–17 CONCACAF Champions League group stage
3	Comunicaciones	44	20	9	15	58	47	+11	69	
4	Municipal	44	18	13	13	57	48	+9	67	
5	Guastatoya	44	19	8	17	59	51	+8	65	
6	Xelajú MC	44	18	11	15	41	42	−1	65	
7	Marquense	44	16	12	16	52	57	−5	60	
8	Petapa	44	14	14	16	62	71	−9	56	
9	Mictlan	44	15	11	18	45	56	−11	56	
10	Cobán Imperial	44	12	15	17	37	66	−29	51	
11	Malacateco	44	13	9	22	59	65	−6	48	
12	Universidad SC	44	12	11	21	48	76	−28	47	

Updated to match(es) played on 2016. Source: Soccerway
Rules for classification: 1) points; 2) goal difference; 3) number of goals scored.
(C) Champions; (Q) Qualified for the phase indicated

== List of foreign players in the league ==
This is a list of foreign players in Clausura 2016. The following players:

1. have played at least one apertura game for the respective club.
2. have not been capped for the Guatemala national football team on any level, independently from the birthplace

A new rule was introduced a few season ago, that clubs can only have five foreign players per club and can only add a new player if there is an injury or player/s is released.

Antigua GFC

- (Costa Rica) Mandred Russell
- (Costa Rica) Alexander Robinson
- (Trinidad and Tobago) Mekeil Williams
- (Mexico) Agustín Herrera
- (Colombia) Justin Arboleda

Cobán Imperial

- (Colombia) Arnulfo Beitar
- (Guadeloupe) Victor Guay
- (Uruguay) Mario Piñeyro

CSD Comunicaciones

- (Nicaragua) Juan Barrera
- (Paraguay) Joel Benítez
- (Panama) Rolando Blackburn
- (Argentina) Emiliano Lopez

Guastatoya

- (Paraguay) Orlando Moreira
- (Paraguay) Víctor Solalinde
- (Uruguay) Álvaro García

Deportivo Mictlan

- (Colombia) Juan Aguirre
- (Colombia) Marlon Negrete
- (Colombia) William Negrete
- (Panama) Ricardo Romero

Deportivo Malacateco

- (Mexico) Juan Carlos Meza
- (Colombia) Jhon Jairo Palacios
- (Argentina) Carlos Díaz
- (Mexico) Ricardo Rocha

(player released during the season)

Deportivo Marquense

- (Argentina) Matías Triofini

CSD Municipal

- (Brazil) Janderson Pereira
- (El Salvador) Jaime Alas
- (Uruguay) Gastón Puerari
- (Costa Rica) Keylor Soto

Deportivo Petapa

- (Argentina) Juan Lovato
- (Uruguay) Adrian Apellaniz
- (Argentina) Matías Quinteros

CD Suchitepéquez

- (Argentina) Francisco Ladogana
- (Argentina) Mauricio Gerni
- (Argentina) Omar Salazar
- (Canada) David Monsalve

Universidad SC

- (Uruguay) Guillermo Chavasco
- (El Salvador) Rafael Burgos
- (Honduras) Michel Rivera
- (Mexico) Carlos Kamiani Félix

Club Xelajú MC

- (Costa Rica) Cristhian Lagos
- (Brazil) Juliano Rangel de Andrade
- (Colombia) Juan Baena
- (Honduras) José Mendoza
