= Football in Guatemala =

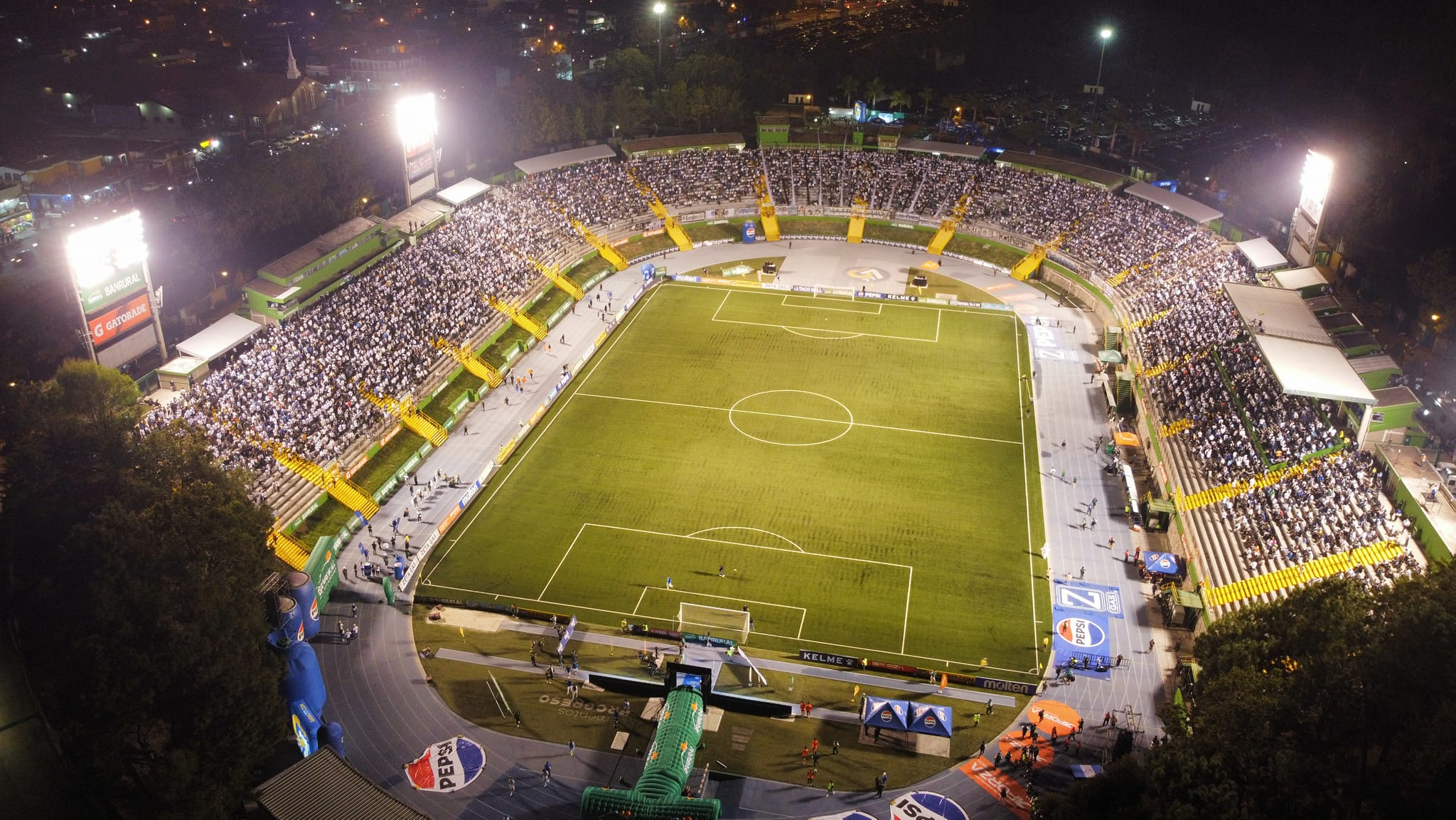
- Cementos Progreso Stadium
- Country: Guatemala
- Governing body: FEDEFUT
- National team: Men's national team Women's national team

National competitions
- FIFA World Cup; CONCACAF Gold Cup; CONCACAF Nations League; FIFA Women's World Cup; CONCACAF W Gold Cup; CONCACAF W Championship

Club competitions
- List: League: Liga Nos Une Liga Nacional Femenina Liga Primera División Liga Segunda División Liga Tercera División; Cups: Copa de Guatemala Copa Campeón de Campeones

International competitions
- FIFA Club World Cup; CONCACAF Champions Cup; CONCACAF Central American Cup

Football is the most popular sport in Guatemala and is run by the Federación Nacional de Fútbol de Guatemala. The association administers the national football team, as well as the Liga Bantrab.

== Local tournaments ==
The first clubs of the country were established in the capital Guatemala City, where a second football club was founded with Olympic FC at the beginning of the 20th century. These two teams started the first competition with the Copa Centroamericana between 28 August and 30 October 1904, and they were conceded exclusively between these two teams, who competed ten times against each other. With six wins and a draw against three defeats, the younger Olympic FC won this first match. The second competition took place between October 1905 and February 1906 and was contested by a total of three teams. Once again, Olympic FC went through, but the Guatemala FC "defended" second place in front of the newly added team of the Gay SC. After that, other tournaments were played out as of 1911 under the new name Copa Manuel Estrada Cabrera. The first tournament won the Gay SC, but in the years 1913 and 1914 the Guatemala FC finally entered the winner list

Soon football reached the second largest city in the country, Quetzaltenango, where Quetzaltenango FC was founded in May 1906.

In 1919 the League Capitalina was launched and the first Campeonato Nacional was played, which was won by the Hércules FC.

With the establishment of the Campeonato de Liga for the season 1942/43, professional football was introduced in Guatemala. Since then the country's football has been dominated by the two major rivals from Guatemala City, CSD Comunicaciones and CSD Municipal, who have won the championship title 59 times already (until the end of the 2015/16 season, Comunicaciones was successful 30 times, Municipal 29 Times). In the third place follows by a long distance the Aurora F.C., which also plays in the capital, and between 1964 and 1992/93 a total of eight times came to champions. The best team outside the capital is Club Xelajú MC from Quetzaltenango, which has five titles.

== International competitions ==
=== Club football ===
CSD Municipal won the CONCACAF Champions Cup in 1974. Four years later, the arch-rival Comunicaciones F.C. also achieved this triumph, although it was only one of three season winners. However, because the tournament of the year 1978 was not carried out anymore, all three teams were declared as equivalent tournament champions.

Comunicaciones won the final in the first tournament in 1962, where they also failed against the Mexican neighbor Chivas Guadalajara as well as seven years later against Cruz Azul. Municipal reached the final once again in 1995 and failed in this case against the Costa Rican club Deportivo Saprissa.

=== National team ===
The Guatemalan national soccer team celebrated their best result so far with fourth place at the 1996 CONCACAF Gold Cup.

The only notable title the national team won was the 1967 CONCACAF Championship against neighbors Mexico.

The qualification for a FIFA World Cup has not yet been achieved, but the Olympics have been played, in 1968, 1976, and 1988, achieving its best result in its first participation by arriving to the quarter-finals.

== League system ==
Level	League(s)/Division(s)
1	Liga Guate; 12 clubs
	↓↑ 2 clubs
2	Primera División; 20 clubs divided in 2 series of 10
	↓↑ 3 clubs
3	Segunda División; 40 clubs divided in 5 series of 8 clubs
4	Tercera División; 92 clubs divided in 16 series, one of 7 clubs, ten of 6 clubs, two of 5 clubs, one of 4 clubs and two of 3 clubs

== Stadiums in Guatemala ==
#	Stadium	Sport	Capacity	Tenants	Image
1	Estadio Doroteo Guamuch Flores	Football	26,000	Guatemala national football team	
2	Estadio Israel Barrios	Football	20,000	Coatepeque FC	
3	Estadio Cementos Progreso	Football	17,000	Comunicaciones FC	
4	Estadio Verapaz	Football	15,000	CD Cobán Imperial	
5	Estadio Mario Camposeco	Football	11,220	CSD Xelajú MC	
6	Estadio Carlos Salazar Hijo	Football	10,000	CSD Suchitepéquez	
7	Estadio Pensativo	Football	10,000	Antigua GFC	

== Attendances ==
The average attendance per top-flight football league season and the club with the highest average attendance:

Season	League average	Best club	Best club average
2019 Apertura	5,061	Comunicaciones	8,312

== See also ==
- Lists of stadiums
