= Ángel Prudencio =

Argentinian association football player

Personal information
- Full name: Ángel Oscar Prudencio
- Date of birth: 13 October 1990 (age 36)
- Place of birth: Villa María, Argentina
- Height: 1.85 m (6 ft 1 in)
- Position: Forward

Youth career
- Instituto

Senior career*
Years	Team	Apps	(Gls)
2011	Instituto	3	(0)
2011–2012	Racing Club	0	(0)
2012–2015	Santamarina	47	(11)
2014	→ Cipolletti (loan)	4	(0)
2015	→ Suchitepéquez (loan)	17	(5)
2016	Tiro Federal	11	(1)
2016–2017	Santamarina	22	(3)
2017	Defensores de Belgrano	16	(4)
2018	Santamarina	18	(4)
2019	Talleres	29	(8)
2020–2021	Independiente Rivadavia	11	(2)
2021	Sportivo Belgrano	19	(1)
2022	Universitario de Sucre	34	(8)
2023	Cipolletti	3	(0)
2023–2024	Gimnasia Tandil		
Total		234	(47)
- * Club domestic league appearances and goals

Ángel Oscar Prudencio (born 13 October 1990) is an Argentine former professional footballer who played as a forward.

== Career ==
Prudencio's career began in the ranks of Instituto, before making the move into their senior squad in 2011. He was on the substitutes bench on 28 May against Ferro Carril Oeste, with his professional bow coming versus Deportivo Merlo on 6 June. In the following August, Prudencio was signed by Argentine Primera División side Racing Club. However, the forward left eleven months later after no appearances. Prudencio joined Santamarina of Torneo Argentino A in July 2012. He netted twice on debut in a win away to Unión Mar del Plata in August. His second season ended with promotion to Primera B Nacional.

With Santamarina now in the second tier, Prudencio was subsequently loaned to Torneo Federal A team Cipolletti. Four appearances followed as they placed sixth in Zone 1. June 2015 saw Prudencio move to Guatemalan football as he agreed to join Suchitepéquez on loan. He scored goals in fixtures with Municipal, Marquense, Comunicaciones, Universidad, Xelajú and Guastatoya in the first part of 2015–16, but missed the rest of the campaign after returning to Santamarina at the end of 2015. In 2016, Prudencio signed for Tiro Federal, though he rejoined tier two's Santamarina six months later after relegation.

Having scored three times in twenty-four matches, Prudencio was on the move again on 17 August 2017 as he joined Defensores de Belgrano in the third tier. His first appearance was in a Copa Argentina tie with top division Belgrano, who eliminated Defensores de Belgrano but Prudencio had scored their only goal. Once more, Prudencio spent a few months away before resigning with Santamarina. He netted twice, including against former team Instituto, in eleven encounters during 2017–18. Prudencio departed the club in January 2019, signing for Talleres in Primera B Metropolitana. Eight goals followed for them.

In January 2020, Prudencio joined Independiente Rivadavia in Primera B Nacional.

== Career statistics ==
As of 30 June 2020.

Club statistics
Club	Season	League			Cup		Continental		Other		Total	
Club	Season	Division	Apps	Goals	Apps	Goals	Apps	Goals	Apps	Goals	Apps	Goals
Instituto	2010–11	Primera B Nacional	3	0	0	0	—		0	0	3	0
Racing Club	2011–12	Primera División	0	0	0	0	—		0	0	0	0
Santamarina	2012–13	Torneo Argentino A	28	6	2	0	—		2 (Note: Appearance(s) in the Torneo Argentino A play-offs)	0	32	6
Santamarina	2013–14	Torneo Argentino A	19	5	5	0	—		0	0	24	5
Santamarina	2014	Primera B Nacional	0	0	0	0	—		0	0	0	0
Santamarina	2015	Primera B Nacional	0	0	0	0	—		0	0	0	0
Santamarina	Total		47	11	7	0	—		2	0	56	11
Cipolletti (loan)	2014	Torneo Federal A	4	0	0	0	—		0	0	4	0
Suchitepéquez (loan)	2015–16	Liga Nacional	17	5	—		—		2 (Note: Appearance(s) in the Liga Nacional play-offs)	1	19	6
Tiro Federal	2016	Torneo Federal A	11	1	0	0	—		0	0	11	1
Santamarina	2016–17	Primera B Nacional	22	3	2	0	—		0	0	24	3
Defensores de Belgrano	2017–18	Torneo Federal A	16	4	1	1	—		0	0	17	5
Santamarina	2017–18	Primera B Nacional	11	2	0	0	—		0	0	11	2
Santamarina	2018–19	Primera B Nacional	7	2	0	0	—		0	0	7	2
Santamarina	Total		18	4	0	0	—		0	0	18	4
Talleres	2018–19	Primera B Metropolitana	17	4	0	0	—		0	0	17	4
Talleres	2019–20	Primera B Metropolitana	12	4	0	0	—		0	0	12	4
Talleres	Total		29	8	0	0	—		0	0	29	8
Independiente Rivadavia	2019–20	Primera B Nacional	6	2	0	0	—		0	0	6	2
Career total			173	38	10	1	—		4	1	187	40

== Honours ==
Santamarina

- Torneo Argentino A: 2013–14
