= Pablo Melgar =

Guatemalan footballer

Personal information
- Full name: Pablo Sebastián Melgar Torino
- Date of birth: 14 January 1980 (age 46)
- Place of birth: Guatemala City, Guatemala
- Height: 1.80 m (5 ft 11 in)
- Position: Centre-back

Youth career
- Comunicaciones
- Universidad Católica

Senior career*
Years	Team	Apps	(Gls)
1999	Club Atlético Tembetary		
1999–2000	Zacapa	8	(0)
2001–2002	Antigua GFC	12	(0)
2002–2004	Aurora	27	(1)
2004–2006	Municipal	56	(2)
2007	Antofagasta	12	(0)
2008	Municipal	13	(0)
2008–2009	Suchitepéquez	32	(3)
2009–2010	USAC		
2010–2011	Suchitepéquez		
2011	Antigua GFC		

International career
2002–2007	Guatemala	55	(1)
- * Club domestic league appearances and goals

Pablo Sebastián Melgar Torino (born 14 January 1980) is a Guatemalan-Chilean former professional footballer who played as a centre-back.

== Club career ==
Before playing in Chile, Melgar played for local clubs Deportivo Zacapa, Antigua GFC, Aurora F.C., and Municipal, the latter from 2004 to 2007, during which time the club won five league titles in a row. He then left Municipal for Antofagasta but decided not to return to Chile after finding it hard to play football outside the capital, Santiago de Chile. After a stint with USAC, Melgar returned to Municipal for the Apertura 2010 season.

== International career ==
Melgar was a regular on the Guatemala national team, for which he competed at the youth, Olympic, and full international levels. Tournaments in which he partaked include the under-17 and under-20 World Cup qualifying, the 1999 Pan American Games, the 2000 Olympic tournament qualifying and the Central American Games of 2002.

He made his senior debut in a January 2002 friendly match against Cuba and earned a total of 56 caps (including a non official game against Argentina), scoring 1 goal. He represented his country in 16 FIFA World Cup qualification matches and played at the 2003 UNCAF Nations Cup and the 2005 and 2007 CONCACAF Gold Cups.

== Personal life ==
Melgar is the son of the former Guatemala international footballer Armando Melgar and the older brother of the also former footballer Javier Melgar.

From his maternal line, Pablo and Javier are the grandsons of the Chilean former footballer and manager Rolando Torino. Due to his Chilean heritage, they naturalized Chilean by descent.
