= Gerardo Gordillo =

Guatemalan footballer (born 1994)

Personal information
- Full name: Gerardo Arturo Gordillo Olivero
- Date of birth: 17 August 1994 (age 32)
- Place of birth: Guatemala City, Guatemala
- Height: 1.87 m (6 ft 2 in)
- Position: Centre-back

Team information
- Current team: Xelajú

Youth career
- Antigua

Senior career*
Years	Team	Apps	(Gls)
2013–2014	Enosis Neon Paralimni	0	(0)
2014	Marquense	7	(0)
2015	Battipagliese	11	(0)
2015–2016	Antigua	24	(0)
2016–2020	Comunicaciones	89	(5)
2021	UTC	18	(1)
2022	Gualaceo	14	(0)
2022	Coquimbo Unido	11	(0)
2023	Juventude	1	(0)
2023–2025	Comunicaciones	48	(2)
2025–	Xelajú	0	(0)

International career^{‡}
2010–2011	Guatemala U17	6	(0)
2012–2013	Guatemala U20	5	(0)
2019–2023	Guatemala	26	(3)
- * Club domestic league appearances and goals as of 20:00, 30 May 2025 (UTC) ‡ National team caps and goals as of 20:00, 17 October 2023 (UTC)

Gerardo Arturo Gordillo Olivero (born 17 August 1994) is a Guatemalan professional footballer who plays as a centre-back for Liga Bantrab club Xelajú.

== Club career ==
Born in Guatemala City, Gordillo began his career at Antigua before joining Cypriot side Enosis Neon Paralimni. He appeared in his first match on 29 September 2013 against AEK Larnaca as an unused substitute.

=== Marquense ===
After not seeing any playing time for the club, Gordillo returned to Guatemala and joined Deportivo Marquense. He made his debut for the club on 13 March 2014 against Comunicaciones, coming on as an 81st-minute substitute for Jonny Brown as the match ended in a 1–1 draw.

=== Battipagliese ===
After playing one season for the club, Gordillo moved abroad again, this time joining Battipagliese in Italy.

=== Return to Antigua ===
After spending a season in Italy, Gordillo returned again to Guatemala and joined his former youth club Antigua. He made his debut for the club on 11 March 2015 against Deportivo Coatepeque in which he started during a 1–0 victory for the club. During his second season with the club, he helped Antigua become champions of the 2015–16 Apertura. He started for Antigua in the first leg of the finals against Guastatoya, earning a yellow card in the 57th minute as his side succumbed to a 2–1 defeat. He then came off the bench as a substitute in the second leg on 20 December 2015 as Antigua won 2–0 and 3–2 on aggregate.

=== Comunicaciones ===
On 10 June 2016, it was announced that Gordillo had signed with Comunicaciones. After starting a couple matches from the bench, Gordillo made his debut for the club on 5 February 2017 against his former club Deportivo Marquense. He started as the match ended in a 1–1 draw.

The next season, on 27 August 2017, Gordillo would score his first professional goal against Suchitepéquez. His 79th-minute goal was the second in a 2–0 victory.

Two seasons later, on 2 August 2019, Gordillo made his international club debut in the CONCACAF League against the Honduran side Marathón. He started and scored a goal in the 47th minute as Comunicaciones won 2–1. He would go on to help Comunicaciones qualify for the 2020 CONCACAF Champions League via finishing as the second best quarter-finalist side. In the process, Gordillo also earned a spot in the best eleven for the CONCACAF League.

On 20 February 2020, Gordillo started in Comunicaciones opening match of the Champions League against Mexican side América. He scored the opening goal in the match in the 81st minute of the match to give his side the lead but América would go on to equalize in stoppage time as the match ended 1–1. After the match, Gordillo was named in CONCACAF's best eleven for the Round of 16 first leg matches.

=== UTC ===
On 8 January 2021, Gordillo joined Peruvian Liga 1 club UTC. He made his debut with the club on 12 March, in a 1–0 away league defeat against Cienciano. Five days later, on 17 March, Gordillo made his Copa Sudamericana debut in a 1–0 defeat against Sport Huancayo.

Gordillo scored his first goal for UTC on 15 April, opening the scoring in a 3–1 victory over Melgar. His goal and his performance lead to Gordillo being included in the league's team of the week for that round.

=== Coquimbo Unido ===
On 6 July 2022, Gordillo moved to Chile and joined Primera División side Coquimbo Unido.

=== Xelajú ===
On 16 May 2025, Gordillo, along with Antonio López, were presented as new signings of Xelajú.

== International career ==
Gordillo made his international debut for Guatemala on 16 October 2019 against Bermuda in an international friendly. He started as the match ended in a 0–0 draw.

== Career statistics ==
=== Club ===
As of match played 17 May 2021

Appearances and goals by club, season and competition
Club	Season	League			Cup		Continental		Total	
Club	Season	Division	Apps	Goals	Apps	Goals	Apps	Goals	Apps	Goals
Enosis Neon Paralimni	2013–14	Cypriot First Division	0	0	0	0	0	0	0	0
Deportivo Marquense	2013–14	Liga Nacional de Guatemala	7	0					7	0
Antigua	2014–15	Liga Nacional de Guatemala	2	0					2	0
Antigua	2015–16	Liga Nacional de Guatemala	22	0					22	0
Antigua	Total		24	0	0	0	0	0	24	0
Comunicaciones	2016–17	Liga Nacional de Guatemala	15	0					15	0
Comunicaciones	2017–18	Liga Nacional de Guatemala	20	4					20	4
Comunicaciones	2018–19	Liga Nacional de Guatemala	28	1					28	1
Comunicaciones	2019–20	Liga Nacional de Guatemala	18	0			7	3	25	3
Comunicaciones	2020–21	Liga Nacional de Guatemala	8	0			1	0	9	0
Comunicaciones	Total		89	5	0	0	8	3	96	8
UTC	2021	Liga 1	7	1			2	0	9	1
Career total			127	6	0	0	10	3	137	9

=== International ===
As of match played 17 October 2023

Appearances and goals by national team and year
National team	Year	Apps	Goals
Guatemala	2019	1	0
Guatemala	2020	2	0
Guatemala	2021	8	2
Guatemala	2022	10	1
Guatemala	2023	5	0
Total		26	3

Scores and results list Guatemala's goal tally first.

No.	Date	Venue	Opponent	Score	Result	Competition
1.	4 June 2021	Estadio Doroteo Guamuch Flores, Guatemala City, Guatemala	Saint Vincent and the Grenadines	5–0	10–0	2022 FIFA World Cup qualification
2.	18 July 2021	Toyota Stadium, Frisco, United States	Trinidad and Tobago	1–1	1–1	2021 CONCACAF Gold Cup
3.	27 March 2022	DRV PNK Stadium, Fort Lauderdale, United States	Haiti	2–1	2–1	Friendly

== Honours ==
Antigua

- Liga Nacional: 2015 Apertura

Comunicaciones

- Liga Nacional: 2023 Apertura
