= Kevin Garcia =

Kevin Garcia may refer to:

- Kevin Garcia (musician) (1975–2017), bassist for the band Grandaddy
- Kevin García (footballer, born 1989), Spanish football left-back
- Kevin Garcia (soccer, born 1990), American soccer defender
- Kevin Garcia-Lopez (born 1992), American soccer defender

== See also ==
- Kervin García (born 1990), Guatemalan football defender
