= IRCA =

IRCA may refer to:

- First Nations Media Australia, formerly Indigenous Remote Communications Association
- Immigration Reform and Control Act of 1986
- Institut royal de la culture amazighe
- International Ragdoll Cat Association
- International Railways of Central America, a Guatemalan railway
- IRCA (football club), an association football club in Guatemala belonging to International Railways of Central America
