= Javier Mascaró =

Chilean footballer and manager (1924–2008)

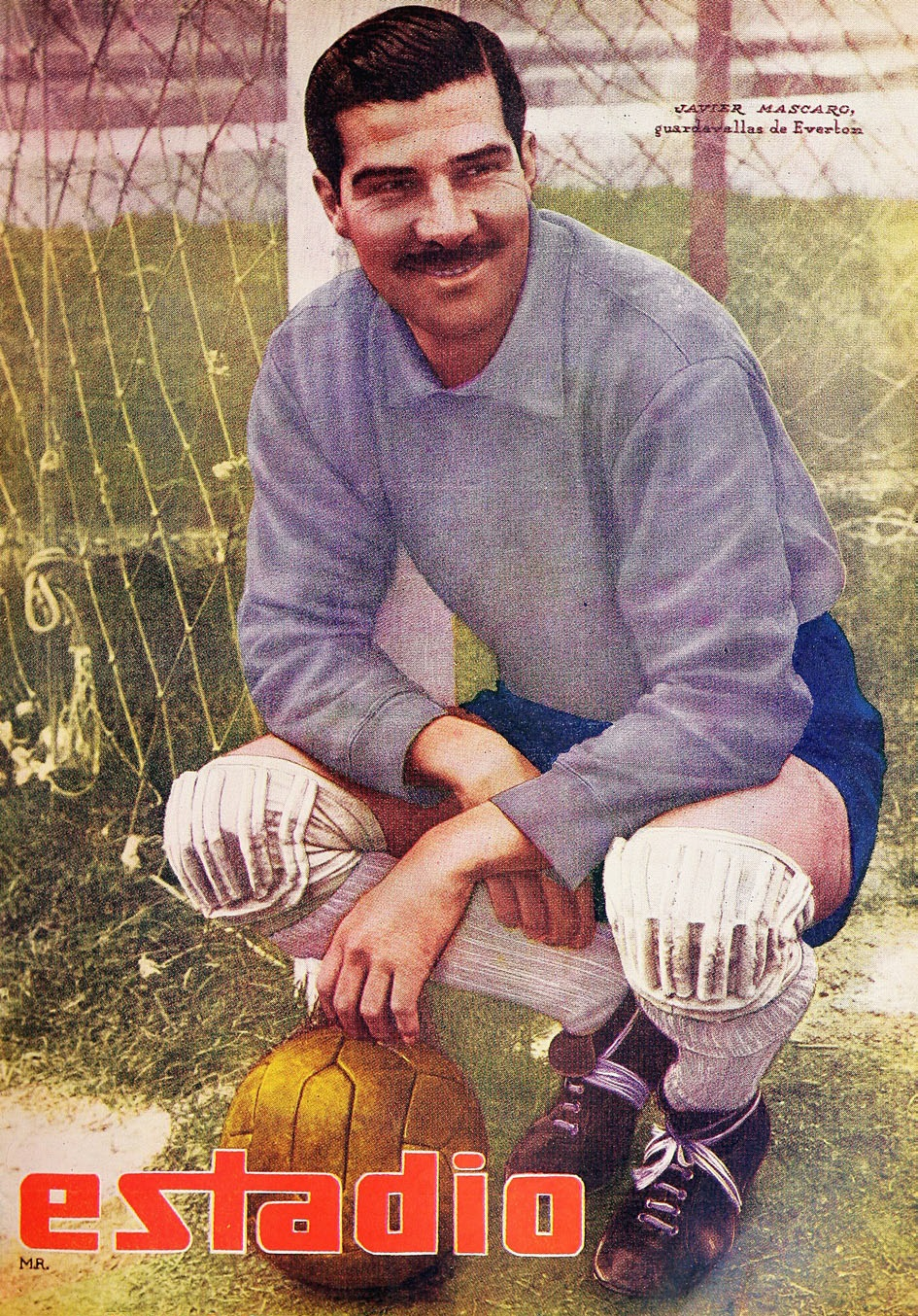

Personal information
- Full name: Carlos Javier Mascaró Vildósola
- Date of birth: 9 October 1924
- Place of birth: Santiago, Chile
- Position: Goalkeeper

Youth career
- Universidad Católica

Senior career*
Years	Team	Apps	(Gls)
1942–1943	Universidad Católica		
1944	Green Cross		
1945–1946	Universidad Católica		
1947	Santiago Wanderers		
1948–1949	Everton		
1950	Colo-Colo	1	(0)
1951	Universidad de Chile		

Managerial career
- 1954–1955: Olhanense
- 1964: FAS
- 1966–1968: Comunicaciones
- 1970: Atlante San Alejo
- 1970–1971: FAS
- 1971: Porvenir Miraflores
- 1973: Juventud Olímpica
- 1975: UES
- 1977: UES
- 1978: C.D. Once Municipal
- 1978–1979: Águila
- 1980–1981: Xelajú MC
- 1982: Municipal
- 1983: Deportivo Saprissa
- 1987: Suchitepéquez
- 1991–1992: Xelajú MC
- * Club domestic league appearances and goals

Carlos Javier Mascaró Vildósola (9 October 1924 – 8 July 2008), known as Javier Mascaró, was a Chilean football manager and a goalkeeper.

== Playing career ==
A goalkeeper, Mascaró is one of the few players who have played for the three greatest clubs in Chilean football: Universidad Católica (1942–46), Colo-Colo (1950) and Universidad de Chile (1951), becoming the first goalkeeper to do it before Adolfo Nef, Oscar Wirth and Paulo Garcés. A product of Universidad Católica youth system, he also played for Green Cross (1944), Santiago Wanderers (1947) and Everton (1948–49).

In January and February 1944, he took part in two matches against the Punta Arenas team representing Universidad Católica, the second and the third matches in the history of that city versus any professional team, since it doesn't have professional football. The results were losses by 3–1 and 2–1. For Santiago Wanderers, he made his debut in a match against Unión Española on 15 May 1947. For Colo-Colo, he made just one appearance, in a 2–2 draw against his former team, Everton, on 16 July 1950.

== Coaching career ==
With an extensive career, he mainly developed it out of his country of birth.

In Portugal he coached Olhanense (1954–55).

In El Salvador, he coached FAS, Atlante San Alejo, Juventud Olímpica, Universidad de El Salvador and Aguila.

In Peru he coached Porvenir Miraflores in 1971.

In Guatemala, he coached Comunicaciones, Xelajú MC, getting the league title in 1980, Municipal and Suchitepéquez.

He is one of the five Chilean coaches who have led Municipal along with Luis Grill Prieto, Jaime Hormazábal, Rolando Torino and Fernando Díaz. During his stint with Municipal, he led the team in just one derby against Comunicaciones.

In 1983 he coached Deportivo Saprissa in Costa Rica.

== Personal life ==
Both his son, Javier "Chicho" Mascaró Vásquez, and his grandson, Javier Mascaró Jory, were noted rugby union players and coaches. Also, both his son Juan Mascaro and grandson Juan Mascaro Jr. are both current football coaches.

== Honours ==
Xelajú MC

- Liga Nacional: 1980
