= Ross Russell =

Ross Russell may refer to:

- Ross Russell (jazz) (1909–2000), American jazz producer and author
- Ross Russell (footballer, born 1967), Trinidadian football manager and former goalkeeper
- Ross Russell (footballer, born 1992), Trinidadian football left-back
