= Rolando Torino =

Chilean footballer and manager (1929–2018)

Personal information
- Full name: Segundo Rolando Torino Flores
- Date of birth: 10 July 1929
- Place of birth: Caleta Río Seco, Iquique, Chile
- Date of death: 24 October 2018 (aged 89)
- Place of death: Guatemala City, Guatemala

Youth career
- 1945–1946: Iquique (city team)

Senior career*
| Years | Team | Apps | (Gls) |
| 1947–1948 | Copiapó (city team) | | |
| 1949–1950 | Chillán (city team) | | |
| 1951 | Universidad de Chile | | |
| 1952 | Colo-Colo | | |
| 1953 | Instituto O'Higgins | | |

Managerial career
- 1954–1958: Universidad de Chile (assistant)
- 1959–1961: Universidad de Chile (youth)
- Universidad de Chile (caretaker)
- 1961: San Bernardo Central
- 1962–1963: San Antonio Unido
- 1964: Transandino
- 1966: Chile (amateur)
- 1967–1969: Audax Italiano
- Colchagua
- Soinca Bata
- 1972: Naval
- 1973: Cementos Novella
- Juventud Retalteca
- Antigua GFC
- Xelajú MC
- Deportivo Zacapa
- 1983: Unión La Calera
- 1984–1985: Tipografía Nacional
- 1986: Municipal
- Juventud Olímpica
- 1989–1990: Dragón
- Águila
- Marathón
- 1993–1994: Deportivo Zacapa
- 1994–1995: Deportivo Amatitlán
- 2009–2010: Deportivo Coatepeque
- 2010–2011: Heredia Jaguares
- 2011–2012: Deportivo Zacapa
- * Club domestic league appearances and goals

Segundo Rolando Torino Flores (10 July 1929 – 24 October 2018), known as Rolando Torino, was a Chilean football manager and player.

== Early years ==
Born in Caleta Río Seco, Iquique, Torino belonged to a well-known sports family from that city bound to Club Rápido. He played football for the youth team of Iquique (1945–46), but he also reinforced the senior teams of both Copiapó (1947–48) and Chillán (1949–50).

== Playing career ==
In 1951, Torino made his professional debut in Universidad de Chile. Next he played for Colo-Colo (1952) and Instituto O'Higgins (1953, later O'Higgins F.C.).

== Coaching career ==
Torino mainly developed his extensive career in Central America.

Following his retirement as a footballer, Torino began his coaching career as the assistant coach of Luis Álamos in Universidad de Chile and after worked as coach of the youth system and caretaker for the first team from 1959 to 1961. In Chile, he also coached San Bernardo Central, San Antonio Unido, Trasandino, Audax Italiano, Colchagua, Soinca Bata, Naval and Unión La Calera. For San Antonio Unido, he was the first coach in its professional history from 1962 to 1963, becoming the runner-up in the 1962 Segunda División.

At national teams level, he coached the Chile national amateur team in 1966.

Torino came to Guatemala to coach Cementos Novella in the Liga Nacional de Fútbol at the beginning of the 1970s. In that country, he also coached Juventud Retalteca, Antigua GFC, Xelajú MC, Deportivo Zacapa, Tipografía Nacional, Municipal, Deportivo Amatitlán, Deportivo Coatepeque and Heredia Jaguares.

He is one of the five Chilean coaches who have led Municipal along with Luis Grill Prieto, Jaime Hormazábal, Javier Mascaró and Fernando Díaz. During his stint with Municipal, he led the team in two derbies against Comunicaciones, with draws as results.

In the 1980s and the 1990s, he led Juventud Olímpica, Dragón and Águila in El Salvador and Marathón in Honduras. He also had stints with clubs in the United States.

In Guatemala, he also worked as a teller for future football managers along with his Chilean colleague Jaime Hormazábal and as a coach for holiday football academies.

== Personal life ==
Born in Iquique, Torino moved to Santiago and attended the Abelardo Núñez Normal School, where he graduated as a PE teacher in 1951.

He made his home in Guatemala and his grandsons, Pablo and Javier Melgar Torino, were Guatemalan professional football defenders.

He died of natural causes on 23 October 2018 in Guatemala City and his body was cremated.
