= Kervin =

Kervin may refer to:

== People ==
- Kervin Castro (born 1999), Venezuelan professional baseball pitcher for the San Francisco Giants
- Kervin Ebanks (born 1989), Caymanian cricketer
- Kervin García (born 1990), Guatemalan footballer
- Kervin Godon (born 1981), Mauritian international footballer
- Kervin Marc (born 1975), English cricketer
- Kervin Piñerua (1991 – 2016), Venezuelan volleyball player
- Alison Kervin, sports editor of the Mail on Sunday

== Planet ==
- Meanings of minor planet names: 6001–7000 (Kervin), owned by the first discover, Masayuki Iwamoto.
