= IRCA (football club) =

Association football club in Guatemala

- Full name: International Railways of Central America
- Nickname(s): Los Ferrocarrileros (The Railway Workers)
- Founded: 1933; 92 years ago
- Ground: Estadio Autonomía
- League: Liga Nacional de Guatemala

IRCA was a professional football club that was based in Guatemala City. It was founded in 1933 by workers of International Railways of Central America.

== History ==
They earned a spot in Guatemala's top division in 1938 after having won two consecutive second division championships. They were suspended during the 1941 league season. In 1942 year they suffered a 1–8 loss to CSD Municipal, and the following year they were beaten 8–0 by Tipografía Nacional who would win the tournament undefeated. In 1944–45 they finished in fourth place, in the process beating Municipal 5–3 and Universidad 7–1. In 1950–51 they finished in third place, and after a couple of negative seasons they finished third again in 1956, which would prove to be their best season ever as they would go on to win the 1956–57 Domestic Cup title, in the fourth edition of the tournament. In 1957–58 they finished in penultimate place, suffering relegation, but they would return to the top level for the 1961–62 season after one year. They would suffer relegation again by finishing last in the 1963–64 campaign.

As International Railways defaulted and was taken over by the government, the team was affected by the financial issues and struggled in second division until 1970–71 when they resurged as Ferrocarriles de Guatemala (FEGUA) earning promotion. However, the Liga Mayor had become more competitive and they finished last in the standings, losing the category again after losing 1–3 in a playoff against JUCA. They would remain in the lower division, unable to return to the top flight, until they eventually disappeared.

== Honours ==
- Domestic Cup winner: 1

1956–57

- Domestic Cup runner-up: 1

1954
