= Héctor Moreira =

Guatemalan footballer

Personal information
- Full name: Héctor Osberto Moreira Pérez
- Date of birth: 27 December 1987 (age 38)
- Place of birth: Escuintla, Guatemala
- Height: 1.83 m (6 ft 0 in)
- Position: Centre-back

Senior career*
Years	Team	Apps	(Gls)
2009–2010	Deportivo Escuintla		
2010–2011	Zacapa	17	(0)
2011–2016	USAC	170	(6)
2016–2018	Xelajú	86	(4)
2018–2021	Municipal	77	(5)
2021–2025	Xelajú	39	(1)

International career^{‡}
2013–2019	Guatemala	9	(1)
- * Club domestic league appearances and goals as of 8 February 2021 ‡ National team caps and goals as of 7 March 2019

Héctor Osberto Moreira Pérez (born 27 December 1987) is a retired Guatemalan professional footballer.

== Career statistics ==
=== International goal ===
Scores and results list. Guatemala's goal tally first.

No.	Date	Venue	Opponent	Score	Result	Competition
1.	7 March 2019	Banc of California Stadium, Los Angeles, United States	El Salvador	1–3	1–3	Friendly

== Honours ==
Municipal

- Liga Nacional de Guatemala: Apertura 2019

Xelajú

- Liga Nacional de Guatemala: Clausura 2023
