= Luis Grill Prieto =

Argentine football manager

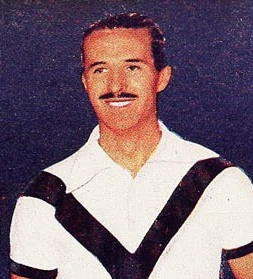

Personal information
- Full name: Luis Grill Prieto
- Date of birth: 1923
- Place of birth: Argentina
- Date of death: 21 April 2011 (aged 82–83)
- Place of death: Guatemala City, Guatemala
- Position: Defender

Senior career*
Years	Team	Apps	(Gls)
- Universidad Católica
- Santiago Morning

Managerial career
- Universidad Católica
- 1963–1964: Municipal
- 1966–1967: León
- 1968–1970: Municipal
- 1970: América
- 1971–1972: Veracruz
- 1973–1974: Atlético Potosino
- 1974: Comunicaciones
- 1977: Atlético Potosino
- 1985: Tecos
- 1982–1983: Atlético Potosino
- 1993–2000: Municipal (youth)
- 2000–2011: Comunicaciones (youth)
- * Club domestic league appearances and goals

Luis Grill Prieto (1928 – 21 April 2011) was an Argentine football player and manager who worked in Chile, Guatemala and Mexico.

== Career ==
Born in 1928, he played football in Chile as a defender for both Universidad Católica and Santiago Morning in the 1940s and the 1950s. In Universidad Católica, he played alongside players such as Sergio Livingstone, Rodolfo Almeyda, Andrés Prieto, among others.

He graduated as a football manager in Santiago, Chile, and coached Universidad Católica.

He came to Guatemala in 1963 to lead Municipal, becoming the first Chilean who has coached it before Jaime Hormazábal, Javier Mascaró, Rolando Torino and Fernando Díaz. During his stints with Municipal, he led the team in thirteen derbies against Comunicaciones and won two league titles in 1963–64 and 1969–70.

In Mexico, he coached León, América, Veracruz, Atlético Potosino and Tecos. With León, he won the 1966–67 Copa México and with Atlético Potosino, he was in three stints: 1973–74, 1977 and 1982–83.

His last works were as coach of the youth ranks of both Municipal and Comunicaciones.

== Personal life ==
He became a naturalized Chilean through his residence there.

Although he had family in Guadalajara, Mexico, after coaching Tecos FC, he made his home in Guatemala and died at the age of 83 due to intestinal issues.

== Honours ==
Municipal

- Liga Nacional (2): 1963–64, 1969–70
- Copa de Guatemala (2): 1967, 1969

León

- Copa México (1): 1966–67

== Legacy ==
Grill Prieto is considered as the discoverer of important Guatemalan players such as Carlos Ruiz, Gonzalo Romero, Marco Ciani, among others.

After his death, Comunicaciones FC started the Copa Luis Grill Prieto in his honor, a friendly match where the club showed the squad for each season. The cup was played three times in 2011, 2012 and 2013 and Comunicaciones won the first two editions.
