= Estadio Revolución (disambiguation) =

Estadio Revolución may refer to:

- Estadio Revolución, Torreón, Mexico
- Estadio Revolución, Irapuato, Mexico, former stadium of Irapuato F.C.
- Estadio Revolución, Guadalajara, Mexico, staged the 1979 Central American and Caribbean Championships in Athletics
- Estadio Revolución Ciudad de Guatemala
- Estadio Revolución, Panama, now renamed as the Estadio Rommel Fernández

== See also ==
- Estadio Revolución Mexicana, Pachuca, Mexico
