= Carlos Kamiani =

Mexican association footballer

Personal information
- Full name: Carlos Kamiani Félix Suénaga
- Date of birth: 5 January 1985 (age 41)
- Place of birth: El Dorado, Sinaloa, Mexico
- Height: 1.80 m (5 ft 11 in)
- Position: Striker

Senior career*
Years	Team	Apps	(Gls)
2002–2007	Altamira		
2007–2016	USAC		(106+)
2016–2018	Municipal	82	(32)
2018–2019	Xelajú	54	(24)
2020–2022	Iztapa	81	(36)
2022–2025	CF Universidad		
- * Club domestic league appearances and goals

Carlos Kamiani Félix Suénaga (born 15 January 1985) is a Mexican professional footballer who plays as a striker.

== Early life ==
Kamiani was born in 1985 in El Dorado, Mexico.

== Club career ==
Kamiani started his career with Mexican side Altamira. He later admitted that he was close to quitting football because he thought his opportunities were running out. However, Félix signed for Guatemalan second-tier side Universidad SC in 2007 at the invitation of his manager, Rafael Loredo, who had left Altamira for Universidad. He helped the club earn promotion to the Guatemalan top flight. In 2016, Félix signed for Guatemalan side Municipal, helping the club win the league. In 2020, he signed for Guatemalan side Iztapa.

In 2021, Kamiani scored his 200th goal in the Liga Nacional de Fútbol de Guatemala. He has been regarded as a legend in Guatemalan league football.
