= Deportivo Champerico =

Guatemalan football club

- Full name: Club Deportivo Champerico
- Ground: Estadio Municipal de Champerico; Champerico, Retalhuleu Department, Guatemala
- Manager: (Guatemala) José Reyes
- League: Segunda División de Ascenso
- Website: https://m.facebook.com/deportivo.champerico/?locale2=es_LA
Home colours	Away colours

Deportivo Champerico is a Guatemalan football club from Champerico, Retalhuleu Department. It currently plays on Segunda División de Ascenso, third tier on Guatemalan football.
