= La Asunción Stadium =

Stadium in Asunción Mita, Guatemala

Coordinates: 14°20′16″N 89°42′52″W

Estadio La Asunción
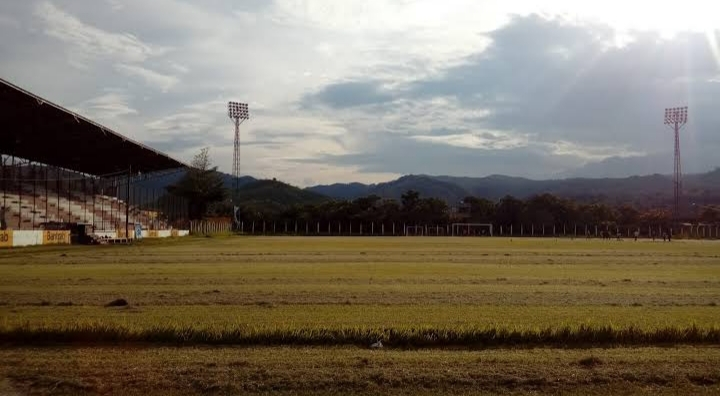
- Interactive map of Estadio La Asunción
- Location: Asunción Mita, Guatemala
- Capacity: 8,000
- Surface: Grass
- Field size: 104 m × 68 m (341 ft × 223 ft)

Construction
- Opened: 1994
- Renovated: 2016, 2025–present
- Expanded: 2025–present

Tenant
- Atlético Mictlán (1994–present)

La Asunción Stadium (Spanish: Estadio La Asunción) is a multi-use stadium in Asunción Mita, Guatemala. It is used mostly for football and is the home stadium of Atlético Mictlán. The capacity of the stadium is 8,000 people.

== History ==
A 2017 report by the National Football Federation of Guatemala found that the stadium was in very poor condition and did not meet FIFA standards for security and infrastructure.

== See also ==
- Lists of stadiums
