= Liga Tercera División =

Guatemalan association football league

Tercera División
- Founded: 1993; 33 years ago
- Country: Guatemala
- Number of clubs: 64
- Level on pyramid: 4
- Promotion to: Liga Segunda División
- Current champions: Poptún (1st title)
- Most championships: Río Dulce (2 titles)
- Broadcaster(s): Facebook; X
- Current: 2025–26 Liga Tercera División

The Tercera División is the fourth and lowest tier league of football in Guatemala, operating under the auspices of the National Football Federation of Guatemala. The league was founded in 1993.

== Format ==
The league has included up to 110 clubs in the past, causing organizational and logistical challenges for league organizers. Prior to the 2024–2025 season, it was announced that the league would be divided into two divisions, Senior Category A and Senior Category B. The top 80 clubs would remain in Category A while remaining clubs would participate in Category B. A promotion/relegation system was introduced between the two categories within the same league. The top clubs from Category A would still have the opportunity for promotion to the Liga Segunda División.

== See also ==
- Football in Guatemala – overview of football sport
