= Liga Segunda División =

Guatemalan association football league

- Organising body: FEDEFUT
- Founded: 1992; 34 years ago
- Country: Guatemala
- Number of clubs: 20
- Level on pyramid: 3
- Promotion to: Liga Primera División
- Relegation to: Liga Tercera División
- Current champions: Aguacatán (2nd title)
- Most championships: Chimaltemango; Quiriguá; San Pedro; Aguacatán (2 titles)
- Broadcaster(s): Tigo Sports; Facebook
- Current: 2025–26 Liga Segunda División

The Liga Segunda División, officially the Liga de Fútbol Segunda División is an institution of professional sports character founded in 1992 and affiliated to the National Federation of football Guatemala, which is organized by the necessity of mass sports of the professional football in Guatemala leading him to have clubs representing it in all the Department of the country, with 40 teams in the different geographical zones of our territory to date.

They constitute one of the largest and best organized sports forces in what refers to professional football in Guatemala, forming a professional sports organization which emerged several sports talent of the Guatemalan football.

== Competition system ==
As in the National League and the First Division, it is divided into two tournaments: Apertura, and Clausura. In each tournament the 40 teams are divided into 5 groups divided geographically. Each team in a group plays a 14 game regular season. Followed by this the top 16 teams from the overall points table play a single elimination playoff tournament.

The champion and runner-up of each tournament vie for the three promotion spots to the First Division, with the Apertura champion playing the Clausura runner-up, and the Clausura champion playing the Apertura runner-up. The winners get promoted, while the losers play each other for the 3rd promotion spot. In the case that in between the Apertura and Clausura champions and runner-ups only 3 different teams appear, all 3 get automatic promotion. If both Apertura and Clausura champions and runner-ups are the same 2 teams both get automatic promotion, and the 3rd spot is given to the winner of a knockout bracket between the Apertura and Clausura semifinalists.

== Clubs ==
=== Grupo A ===
Teams
San Luis FC
Izabal
Deportivo Chamelco
Quirigua
Chisec FC
Panzos
Jaguares Peten
Salama F.C.
Senahu

=== Group B ===
Teams
Teculutan
Palermo-Gualan
Atlas de Esquipulas
Jocotan F.C.
Usumatlan
Juventud Olimpica MACGSA
Tigres del Jumay
Santa Cruz C.C.

=== Grupo C ===
Teams
Guatemala FC
Juventud Pinulteca
Sansare
Naranjeros Escuintla
Sanarate
Tipografia Nacional
Comunicaciones Sub20
USAC

=== Grupo D ===
Teams
Villa Nueva FC
Amatitlán
Santiago DLC
Siquinala
Chimaltenango
Patulul
FC Cotzumalguapa
Tiquisate

=== Grupo E ===
Teams
Ostuncalco FC
Marquense Sub20
Tacana F.C.
Deportivo Ayutla
CSD Solola
CSD Panajachel
Deportivo Reu
Deportivo Champerico
CSD Puerto San José
Juventud Copalera
America F.C. Salcaja
San Sebastian

== See also ==
- Football in Guatemala – overview of football sport
