= Isaac Portillo =

El Salvadorian footballer (born 1994)

Isaac Portillo (born 8 November 1994) is a Salvadoran professional footballer who plays as a midfielder for Primera División club Alianza.

== International career ==
He made his debut for the senior El Salvador national team against Grenada on 26 March 2021.
