= Revolución Stadium =

Stadium in Guatemala City

Coordinates: 14°35′12″N 90°32′53″W

Estadio Revolución
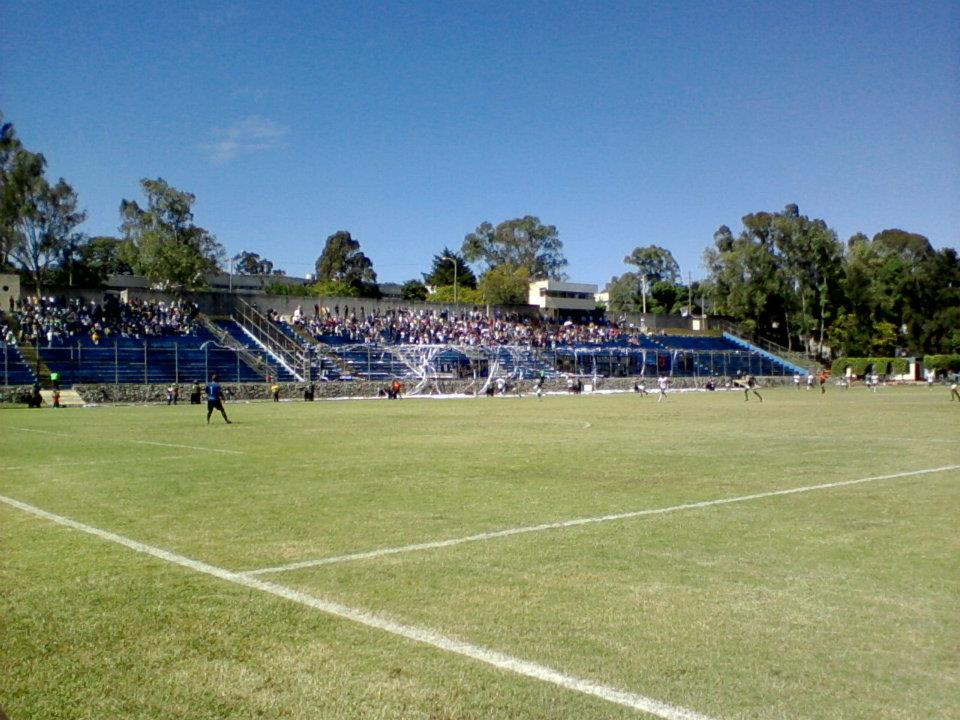
- Interactive map of Estadio Revolución
- Location: Guatemala City, Guatemala
- Operator: Universidad de San Carlos de Guatemala
- Capacity: 5,000
- Surface: GrassMaster
- Field size: 104 m × 68 m (341 ft × 223 ft)

Construction
- Opened: 20 October 1979; 46 years ago
- Renovated: 2017, 2025–present
- Expanded: 2025–present

Tenant
- USAC (1979–present)

Revolución Stadium (Spanish: Estadio Revolución) is a sports venue located in Zone 12 of Guatemala City on the campus of Universidad de San Carlos. Its capacity is 5,000 people and home to USAC that plays in the Liga Segunda División.

== See also ==
- Lists of stadiums
