= CSD Suchitepéquez =

Association football club in Guatemala

Suchi
- Full name: Club Social y Deportivo Suchitepéquez
- Nicknames: Los Venados (The Deer); Los Albiazules (The White and Blues); El Gigante del Sur (The Giant of the South)
- Short name: Suchi
- Founded: 24 November 1960; 65 years ago
- Ground: Estadio Carlos Salazar Hijo
- Capacity: 10,500
- Chairman: Amilcar Alvarado
- Manager: Pablo Melgar
- League: Liga Bantrab
- Clausura 2026: Group A 2nd (Runners-Up)
Home colours	Away colours

Club Social y Deportivo Suchitepéquez, commonly referred to as Suchi, is a Guatemalan professional association football club based in Mazatenango. The club competes in the Liga Bantrab, the top tier of Guatemalan football.

The team was founded in 1960, and won two Liga Nacional championships in 1983 and 2016. Suchitepéquez have played their home matches in the 10,000-capacity Carlos Salazar Hijo since 1966.

== History ==
=== 1980s ===
In 1981, they defeated Spanish league champions Atlético Madrid 1–0 on a friendly match to re-open the Carlos Salazar stadium.

The team's most successful era took place in the mid-1980s. Having been runner-up in the 1982 domestic league, Suchitepéquez won the national league title in 1983, with a record of 16 wins, 4 draws, and 2 losses in 22 matches. The team was managed by the Uruguayan Julio César Cortés, a former Uruguayan international who played in three World Cups. The stars of this team were Uruguayan strikers César Eduardo Méndez and José Luis "Chopo" González.

Suchitepéquez went on to play in the 1983 CONCACAF Champions' Cup, beating Deportivo Saprissa in the first round. In the second round, they drew with Tigres UANL 1–1 in the first leg, and then beat them 3–0 at home, becoming the first Guatemalan football team to defeat a Mexican team in an official tournament. After that they faced Atlante, drawing the first match but losing 0–6 in the second leg to the eventual champions.

They finished second in the local league again in 1984, repeating that in the 1989–90 tournament.

=== 1990s ===
In 1992, Suchitepéquez won the summer (cup) tournament, and then defeated the 1992 league champions Municipal in the Champion of champions ("Super Cup") match. They won further domestic cup (Copa de Guatemala) titles in 1993 and 1997.

==== Relegation ====
The club struggled to remain in the top division during the 1998–99 season, finishing next to last overall, and avoiding relegation in the last instance by winning a relegation play-off. The following year, they finished in last place overall, and were directly relegated.

=== 2000s ===
After four years in Primera División, the club returned to the top division for the 2004–05 season, finishing fourth in the Torneo Apertura.

=== Failed pursuits (2010–15) ===
The club has been a constant top finisher in the Guatemalan top division but has fallen one game short of reaching the final twice. Currently the club has had solid seasons finishing in the top 3 and finished the Clausura 2015 season in 3rd place behind CSD Municipal and champions Comunicaciones. In the summer of 2014, the club signed Emiliano Lopez, an Argentine prospect who finished his first season as the second top scorer in the first division behind Guatemalan star and Municipal forward, Carlos Ruiz. He was the top scorer in the 2015 clausura tournament, with 12 goals.

=== Second league title (2015–16) ===
The club played "La Final" against the champion of the last Clausura Tournament Comunicaciones FC, which in the Estadio Mateo Flores, Comunicaciones FC won the first leg of the Guatemalan championship, winning 2–1, but in the second leg, Suchitepequez came out victorious in their own stadium, Estadio Carlos Salazar Hijo. They won 3–0, making after waiting for 33 years, Suchitepequez champions for the 2nd time in their history.

== Performance in CONCACAF competitions ==
- CONCACAF Cup Winners Cup: 2 appearances

1993 - 4th Place
1995 - Qualifying Stage (Central Zone)

- CONCACAF Champions League: 2 appearances

1983 - Semifinals
2016-17 - Group stage

== Honours ==
=== Domestic honours ===
==== Leagues ====
- Liga Nacional de Guatemala and predecessors
  - Champions (2): 1982–83, Clausura 2016

== Players ==
=== Current squad ===
As of 2022: Note: Flags indicate national team as defined under FIFA eligibility rules; some limited exceptions apply. Players may hold more than one non-FIFA nationality.

No.	Pos.	Nation	Player
3	DF	GUA	Manuel Ochoa
4	DF	GUA	Rafael González
5	DF	GUA	Luis Rodríguez
6	MF	GUA	Miguel González
9	FW	ARG	Alexis Ramos
10	MF	GUA	Kevin Arriola
11	MF	GUA	Edward Santeliz
16	MF	GUA	Selvin Barlovento
17	DF	GUA	Jose Ramos
18	MF	GUA	Kenneth Mérida
19	MF	GUA	Paolo Ortiz

No.	Pos.	Nation	Player
20	FW	PAN	Luis Jaramillo
23	DF	GUA	Víctor Armas
25	GK	GUA	Johnny Navarro
26	MF	GUA	German Esquivel
30	MF	GUA	Oscar Santana
31	DF	GUA	Wilson Morales
32	DF	GUA	Erwin Morales (captain)
52	GK	GUA	Manuel Sosa
77	DF	GUA	Dilan Cifuentes
99	FW	GUA	Erick Rivera
-	FW	PLE	Matías Jadue

== Notable players ==
- (Argentina) (Guatemala) Ricardo Piccinini (GK), (1980s)
- (Guatemala) Mario Acevedo (FW)
- (Guatemala) Julio César Anderson (FW), (1967–69)
- (Guatemala) Marvin Avila (FW), (2007)
- (Guatemala) Fabricio Benítez (MF) (2007–10)
- (Guatemala) Carlos Castañeda (MF), (1980s and 1990s)
- (Guatemala) Manuel Coronado (DF), (1990s)
- (Guatemala) Marco de la Cruz (GK), (1975–84)
- (Guatemala) Rodrigo de Leon (FW)
- (Guatemala) Ricardo Jerez Hidalgo (GK), (1960s)
- (Guatemala) Alejandro Ortiz Obregón (DF), (1980s and 1990s)
- (Guatemala) César "El Picho" Trujillo (FW), (2000s)
- (Guatemala) Edwin Villatoro (FW), (2000s) [active]
- (Peru) Julián Arturo Vargas (DF), (1980s)
- (Uruguay) José Luís "Chopo" González (FW), (1980s)
- (Uruguay) César Eduardo Méndez (FW), (1980s)

== List of coaches ==
- (Guatemala) Manuel Felipe Carrera (1961)
- (Brazil) Arnaldo da Silva (1965–66)
- (Guatemala) Alberto Donis (1967)
- (Chile) Jaime Ormazábal (1968, 1970)
- (Guatemala) Adalberto Donis (1969)
- (Chile) Néstor Valdés (1971)
- (Brazil) Arnaldo da Silva (1972–75)
- (Guatemala) Emilio René Morales Hidalgo (1976)
- (Guatemala) Justo Rufino López (1977)
- (Guatemala) René Aquino Sánchez / Francisco Aquino Sánchez (1977–78)
- (Guatemala) Oscar Raúl Cancinos Vásquez (1978–79)
- (Argentina) Salvador Pericullo (1979–80)
- (Peru) Guillermo Vargas (1980, 1981, 1986)
- (Guatemala) Alfonso Fernández (1981)
- (Chile) Ricardo Sepúlveda (1981)
- (Paraguay) Rafael Fernández (1981)
- (Uruguay) Julio César Cortés (1982–84)
- (Guatemala) Erasmo Arroyo (1985–86)
- (Guatemala) Guillermo Batres (1986, 1989)
- (Guatemala) Francisco Pineda (1987)
- (Chile) Javier Mascaró (1987)
- (Guatemala) Walter Enrique Claveríe Alvarado (1988–90)
- (Guatemala) Manuel de Jesús Castañeda (1991)
- (Guatemala) Leonso Contreras (1991)
- (Guatemala) Carlos Castañeda (1991)
- (Guatemala) Walter Claveríe (1992–93, 1996)
- (Brazil) Odilio Gómez (1993, 1994)
- (Argentina) Ricardo Piccinini (1993–94)
- (Nicaragua) Julio Hernández (1994)
- (Guatemala) Oscar Sanchez (1994)
- (Guatemala) Ernesto Arroyo (1994, 1998)
- (Guatemala) Marco Antonio Matheu (1995)
- (Guatemala) Manuel Castañeda (1997–98)
- (Guatemala) Luís Villacencio (1999)
- (Guatemala) Ever González (2000)
- (Argentina) Carlos de Toro (1999–00)
- (Guatemala) Benjamín Monterroso (2005)
- (Argentina) Horacio Cordero (2005–07)
- (Paraguay) Gabino Rivero (2007–08)
- (Guatemala) Pedro Evangelista Rodríguez (2008)
- (Uruguay) Julio César Antúnez (2008)
- (Honduras) Jorge Pineda (2008–09)
- (Guatemala) Walter Claverí (2009–10)
- (Peru) Agustin Castillo (2010)
- (Uruguay) Richard Presa (2011–2013)
- (Guatemala) Walter Claverí (2013–2016)
- (Guatemala) Eduardo Mendez
- (Argentina) Gustavo Onaindia (2021–2022)
- (Guatemala) Pablo Melgar (2022- )
