= Rafael Loredo =

Mexican footballer and manager (born 1957)

Personal information
- Full name: Rafael Loredo Silva
- Date of birth: 25 August 1957 (age 69)
- Place of birth: Mexico City, Mexico
- Position: Defender

Senior career*
Years	Team	Apps	(Gls)
1979–1982	Atlético Español		
1982–1983	Necaxa		
1983–1985	Oaxtepec		
1986–1988	Ángeles de Puebla		

Managerial career
- 2003–2004: USAC
- 2006–2007: Altamira
- 2007–2010: USAC
- 2012–2014: Club América Coapa
- 2016: Xelajú
- 2018–2019: Petapa
- 2020–2023: Guatemala U20
- 2021: Guatemala (interim)
- 2026: CD Achuapa
- * Club domestic league appearances and goals

Rafael Loredo Silva (born 25 August 1957) is a Mexican football coach and former player who had recently been the head coach for the Guatemala under-20 national team.
