= Deportivo Amatitlán =

Association football club in Guatemala

Amatitlán
- Full name: Deportivo Amatitlán
- Nickname: Pescadores (fishermen)
- Founded: 30 September 1962
- Ground: Estadio Guillermo Slowing, Amatitlán, Guatemala Department, Guatemala
- Capacity: 12,000
- Manager: (Guatemala) Carlos Raúl Enríquez
- League: Segunda División de Ascenso
- Website: https://m.facebook.com/pages/category/Sports---Recreation/CSD-Amatitlan-101299024839054/
Home colours	Away colours

Deportivo Amatitlán is a Guatemalan football club from Amatitlán, Guatemala Department. It was Founded on 30 September 1962 and currently plays on the Segunda División de Ascenso, third tier on Guatemalan football. Originally it was named Finanzas Industriales due to sponsorship by the Ministry of Finance of Guatemala. From 1985 it began to be named Deportivo Amatitlán. The team has participated several times at the highest level. The club also has a women's team.
