= Ross Russell (footballer, born 1992) =

Trinidadian footballer

Personal information
- Full name: Ross Jeivon Russell Jr
- Date of birth: 9 January 1992 (age 34)
- Place of birth: Diego Martin, Trinidad and Tobago
- Height: 1.90 m (6 ft 3 in)
- Position: Left-back

Team information
- Current team: La Horquetta Rangers

Senior career*
Years	Team	Apps	(Gls)
2010–2016	Defence Force		
2018	Morvant Caledonia		
2019–	La Horquetta Rangers		

International career^{‡}
2010	Trinidad and Tobago U20	2	(0)
2019–	Trinidad and Tobago	7	(0)
- * Club domestic league appearances and goals as of 21:27, 12 July 2021 (UTC) ‡ National team caps and goals as of 21:27, 12 July 2021 (UTC)

Ross Jeivon Russell Jr (born 9 January 1992) is a Trinidadian professional footballer who plays as a left-back for the club La Horquetta Rangers and the Trinidad and Tobago national team.

== International career ==
Russel debuted for the Trinidad and Tobago national team in a 1–1 CONCACAF Nations League tie with Martinique on 6 September 2019. He was called up to represent Trinidad and Tobago at the 2021 CONCACAF Gold Cup.

== Personal life ==
Ross is the son of the Trinidadian football manager and former goalkeeper of the same name, Ross Roy Russell. Ross was in jail for 2 years as he awaited charges for the murder of former Diego Martin resident Selwyn Gaff, who died of a gunshot wound. Ross was charged with murder, possession of arms, and shooting with intent to do bodily harm. He was cleared of charges and released on 20 August 2018.

== Honours ==
Defence Force

- TT Pro League: 2010–11, 2012–13
