= Copa de Guatemala =

Guatemalan association football tournament

- Founded: 1904; 122 years ago
- Abolished: 2019; 7 years ago
- Region: Guatemala
- Teams: various
- Last champions: Cobán Imperial
- 2018–19 Copa de Guatemala

The Copa de Guatemala is the top knock-out club football competition in Guatemala. Since 2003, it is named Copa Centenario.

== List of winners ==
Season	Champion	Runner-up	Final	Notes
1904	Olympic FC	Guatemala FC		Copa Centroamericana
1905–06	Olympic FC	Guatemala FC		Copa Centroamericana
1911 (1)	Gay SC	Ohio	2–1	Copa Manuel Estrada Cabrera
1911 (2)	Michigan	Gay–Ohio	2–0	Copa Manuel Estrada Cabrera
1913	Guatemala FC	Gay SC	3–1	Copa Manuel Estrada Cabrera
1914	Guatemala FC	Gay	6–0	Copa Manuel Estrada Cabrera
1916	Ohio	Cartago–Gay	4–0	Copa Manuel Estrada Cabrera
1917	Allies	Andino	3–1	Copa del Ayuntamiento
1944	Hospicio	Hércules	3–1	
1951–52	Comunicaciones			
1954	Tipografía Nacional	IRCA		
1955	Comunicaciones			
1956–57	IRCA			
1958–59	Aurora			
1960	Municipal			
1963	Xelajú			
1967	Municipal			Copa Presidencial
1967–68	Aurora			
1968–69	Aurora			
1969	Municipal			Copa Federación
1970	Comunicaciones			
1972	Comunicaciones			
1972–73	Xelajú	Comunicaciones	5–1	
1979	Juventud Retalteca			
1980	Galcasa			
1983	Comunicaciones			Copa Verano
1984	Aurora			Copa Verano
1984–85	Juventud Retalteca			Copa Verano
1986	Comunicaciones			Copa Preparación
1991–92	Comunicaciones	Juventud Retalteca	2–0	Copa Aviateca
1992–93	Suchitepéquez	Escuintla	2–1	
1993–94	Suchitepéquez	Mictlán	2–1 (aet)	
1994–95	Municipal	Suchitepéquez	3–0	Copa Gallo
1995–96	Municipal	Xelajú	2–1 agg. (1–0 1–1)	Copa Gallo
1996–97	Amatitlán	Municipal	5–4 agg. (1–1 4–3)	
1997–98	Suchitepéquez	Cobán Imperial	3–1 (aet)	Copa AC Delco
1998–99	Municipal	Aurora		Copa Aqua
2002	Jalapa	Cobán Imperial	5–2	
2003	Municipal	Cobán Imperial	3–1 agg. (2–1 1–0)	Copa Centenario
2003–04	Municipal	Jalapa	5–2 agg. (1–0 4–2)	Copa Centenario
2005	Jalapa	Xelajú	3–2 agg. (3–0 0–2)	Copa Centenario
2006	Jalapa	Municipal	2–1 agg. (1–1 1–0)	Copa Centenario
2009	Comunicaciones	Zacapa	5–1 agg. (1–1 4–0)	Copa Centenario
2010–11	Xelajú	Petapa	3–1 agg. (1–1 2–0)	Copa Centenario
2018–19	Coban Imperial	Deportivo San Pedro	2–0	Torneo de Copa

== Titles ==
Club	Titles	Years
Municipal	8	1960, 1967, 1969, 1994, 1995, 1998, 2003, 2004
Comunicaciones	8	1952, 1955, 1970, 1972, 1983, 1986, 1991, 2009
Aurora	4	1958, 1968, 1969, 1984
Jalapa	3	2002, 2005, 2006
Suchitepéquez	3	1992, 1993, 1997
Xelajú	3	1963, 1973, 2010
Guatemala FC	2	1913, 1914
Olympic FC	2	1904, 1906
Juventud Retalteca	2	1980, 1985
Tipografía Nacional	1	1954
Coban Imperial	1	2018-2019
Amatitlán	1	1996
IRCA	1	1956
Hospicio	1	1944
Galcasa	1	1980
Allies	1	1917
Ohio	1	1916
Michigan	1	1911
Gay SC	1	1911
