= Kervin García =

Guatemalan footballer

Personal information
- Full name: Kervin René García Sandoval
- Date of birth: 7 December 1990 (age 35)
- Place of birth: Livingston, Guatemala
- Height: 1.80 m (5 ft 11 in)
- Position: Centre-back

Team information
- Current team: USAC

Senior career*
Years	Team	Apps	(Gls)
2014–2015	Quiriguá		
2015–2016	Carchá		
2016–2019	Sanarate	23	(0)
2019	Chiantla	20	(0)
2019–2020	Iztapa	32	(9)
2020–2021	Antigua	21	(9)
2021	Cobán Imperial	9	(0)
2022	Iztapa	29	(0)
2022-	USAC	0	(0)

International career^{‡}
2020–	Guatemala	5	(0)
- * Club domestic league appearances and goals as of 01:25, 6 June 2021 (UTC) ‡ National team caps and goals as of 01:25, 6 June 2021 (UTC)

Kervin René García Sandoval (born 7 December 1990) is a Guatemalan footballer who plays as a defender for Primera División club USAC.

== Career ==
García is the youngest of 5 siblings, his brother Nathan is also a professional footballer in Guatemala. Kervin worked as a bricklayer and fisherman as he played amateur footballer on the side. He worked his way up through the Guatemalan football divisions, having played with Sanarate and Iztapa. On 19 July 2020, he signed with Antigua.

== International career ==
García made his international debut for the Guatemala national team in a friendly 2–1 win over Honduras on 15 November 2020.
