= National Football Federation of Guatemala =

Governing body of association football in Guatemala

CONCACAF
- Founded: 1919
- Headquarters: Guatemala City
- FIFA affiliation: 1946
- CONCACAF affiliation: 1961
- President: Gerardo Paiz
- Website: www.fedefutguate.gt

The National Football Federation of Guatemala (Spanish: Federación Nacional de Fútbol de Guatemala), known as Fedefut Guate or FENAFUTG, is the governing body of football in Guatemala. Founded in 1919, it is based in Zone 15 of Guatemala City.

It organizes the football league, Liga Guate, Liga Primera División, Liga Segunda División, Liga Tercera División, the Guatemala national football team, and the Guatemala women's national football team.

FENAFUTG were suspended by FIFA on 28 October 2016, however, the suspension was lifted on May 31, 2018 after the organization's normalization committee became fully operational.

== History ==
The Guatemala national football team represents Guatemala in international matches and it falls under the direct command of Federacion Nacional de Futbol de Guatemala. Association Football was established in 1919 and Guatemala became a FIFA member in 1946, and got their CONCACAF affiliation in 1961.

== Rules of the Guatemalan Football Federation ==
The National Football Federation of Guatemala has been in charge of overseeing many regulations which are divided into general and competition.

The most important general rules are: Status of the National Federation of Association Football in Guatemala, General Rules of Competition, Regulation of the Professional First Division, Regulation Commission Disciplinary Commission, Player Regulations, and rules of the Referees Committee.

The most important competition regulations are the Laws of the Game of FIFA.

== Associations affiliated with FedefutGuate ==
Departmental Associations: Each Departmental Association has the right to integrate the General Assembly one Delegate. In accordance with Rule 109 of the Law for the Development of Physical Culture and Sports, the Executive Committees of the Sports Associations departmental designate one of its members, one delegate and one alternate to the General Assembly of the Federation. These representatives shall hold office for one calendar year, which is the reason why the appointment should be made in the last regular session made by the respective Executive Committee.

National League: The procedure to appoint or elect the delegates and alternates as holders of each league will be as follows: National Football League: will be entitled to appoint ten delegates and their alternate delegates, one for every Club affiliated to it. These delegates are appointed by the Boards of Directors of each club. In accordance with paragraph 3 of Article 21 of this Statute, the delegates from each club must certify by letter to their representation in the General Assembly of Football.

First Division League: Will be entitled to elect five delegates and their alternate delegates. The election of these delegates are chosen by the General Assembly of the League. Fans will not form by region, as determined by the Assembly. If it chose to make the election by region, the Executive Committee of the League affiliated clubs divided into five geographical regions with equal number of members, except mathematical impossibility. Each region will elect its own delegate and a deputy.

Second Division League: Will be entitled to elect three delegates and their alternate delegates. These delegates are elected by the General Assembly of the Second Division League. The election will be done individually for each delegate.

Third Division League: Will be entitled to elect two delegates and their alternate delegates. These delegates are elected by the General Assembly of the Third Division league. The election will be done individually for each delegate.

National Women's Football League: Have the right to appoint (1) delegate and delegate its respective alternate. These delegates are appointed by the Executive Committee of the National Women's Football League. The Executive Committee of the League shall be obliged to make available to the Executive Committee of the Federation for the respective letter of attorney for purposes of accreditation.

Futsal National League: Have the right to appoint (1) delegate and delegate its respective alternate. These delegates are appointed by the Executive Committee of the National Football League Board. The Executive Committee of the League shall be obliged to make available to the Executive Committee of the Federation for the respective letter of attorney for purposes of accreditation.

Other Leagues Affiliated: Any other League affiliate of the National Football Federation is entitled to designate (1) delegate and delegate its respective alternate. These delegates are appointed by the Executive Committee of the League. The Executive Committee of the League shall be obliged to make available to the Executive Committee of the Federation for the respective letter of attorney for purposes of accreditation.

== Committees ==
The Federation will organize, regulate and maintain the technical bodies: a. Statutes & Regulatory Committee b. Coaches Committee and Technical Directors c. Referees Committee d. National Teams Committee e. Professional & Amateur Leagues f. If needed, The others will work under the Federation itself. The Executive Committee shall be regulated with regard to functioning, powers and duties of these committee.

Statutes and Regulatory Committee. 1. The Statutes and Regulatory Committee will be responsible for studying and revisions of requests for amendment to this Statute. 2. They should study and draw up draft regulations to implement this Statute, and to review, analyze and study the rules and regulations of the affiliated institutions, and must render its opinion to the Executive Committee of the Federation for the corresponding effects.

Coaches and Technical Directors Committee. Without prejudice to the powers that national law assigns to the National Association of Coaches, Coaches and Technical Directors Committee will be responsible to educate and train football coaches. This committee will be responsible for the assessment of football coaches and certify to the Executive Committee of the Federation the results of the evaluations for this entity approved practice, if applicable. It should promote the achievement of scholarships abroad to affect the technical capacities of the Guatemalan Football players.

Referees Committee. 1. The Arbitration Committee shall consist of the number of members necessary for the proper performance of its functions to be exercised in accordance with the provisions of FIFA and in coordination with the National Association of Referees, which has established office in the National Law, will have among their functions the organization and functioning of the National School of Arbitrators of the Federation. 2. They will be responsible for submitting to the Executive Committee of the Federation's list of candidates for inclusion in FIFA, according to the regulations thereof. The Federation will make the official registration. 3. The Arbitration Panel of the Federation shall consist of arbitrators who meet the requirements to run football matches. 4. The Arbitration Panel members may choose from among its members a board of directors to represent them before the Federation and the Arbitration Committee to expose and resolve any conflicts that arise related to their functions. 5. Departmental and municipal associations should appoint their own subcommittees arbitration or integrate sub-branches and subsidiaries of referees assigned to the Arbitration Panel of the Federation.

The National Teams Committee. 1. The National Teams Committee will prepare the proposed organization, operation, discipline and budget for submission to the respective acceptance. 2. They should also operate under the Regulation that the Executive Committee of the Federation issues. 3. The Executive Committee of the Federation may grant the Commission authority to hire National Teams regarding sponsorship and management of their funds in order to make it financially independent. 4. The Executive Committee of the Federation may decide not to appoint a Committee of National Teams, in which case these attributes correspond directly to the Executive Committee itself. Article 111. Committee. The committees appointed by the Executive Committee of the Federation may be renewed in whole or in part at any time.

=== Association staff ===
Name	Position	Source
(Guatemala) Gerardo Paiz	President	
(Guatemala) Fernando Fernandez	Vice President	
(Guatemala) Victor Garcia	2nd Vice President	
(Guatemala) William Martinez	General Secretary	
(Guatemala) Carlos Enrique Lopez	Treasurer	
(Colombia) Carlos Estrada	Technical Director	
(Mexico) Luis Fernando Tena	Team Coach (Men's)	
(Mexico) Karla Maya	Team Coach (Women's)	
(Guatemala) Alex Argueta	Media/Communications Manager	
(Guatemala) Hector Aragon	Futsal Coordinator	
(Guatemala) Marco Vinicio Villatoro Calderon	Chairperson of the Referees Committee	
(Mexico) Felipe Ramos Rizo	Head/Director of the Referees Department	
(Mexico) Felipe Ramos Rizo	Referee Coordinator	
