= Universidad de San Carlos CF =

Association football club in Guatemala

USAC
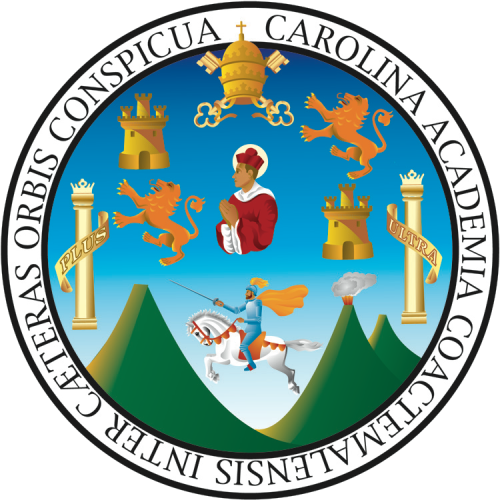
- Full name: Universidad de San Carlos Club de Fútbol
- Nicknames: Los Universitarios (The University Students); Los Estudiosos (The Scholars); Los Huelgueros (The Strikers); Sancarlistas (supporters)
- Short name: USAC
- Founded: 3 March 1922; 104 years ago (as Escuela de Medicina)
- Ground: Estadio Revolución
- Capacity: 5,000
- Owner: USAC
- Manager: Eddy Arenas
- League: Liga Segunda División
- Clausura 2024: Group B 1st (Quarterfinals)
Home colours	Away colours

Universidad de San Carlos Club de Fútbol (Spanish pronunciation: [uniβeɾsiˈða(ð) ðe saŋ ˈkaɾlos ˈkluβ ðe ˈfuðβol]) or, more commonly known as, USAC or just Universidad is a Guatemalan professional football club that represents the Universidad de San Carlos de Guatemala. They currently compete in the Liga Segunda División, the third tier of Guatemalan football.

They are based in Guatemala City, and their home stadium is the Estadio Revolución. The team was formed in 1922, and won 6 league championships.

== Honours ==
=== Domestic Tournaments ===
- Liga Capitalina
  - Winners (6): 1924, 1926, 1928, 1929, 1930, 1931

=== International Tournaments ===
- Interuniversitario Centroamericano
  - Winners (1): 1966

== Players ==
=== Current squad ===
Note: Flags indicate national team as defined under FIFA eligibility rules; some limited exceptions apply. Players may hold more than one non-FIFA nationality.

No.	Pos.	Nation	Player
1	GK	GUA	Ricardo Trigueño
2	DF	GUA	José Gonzales
3	DF	GUA	Hector Moreira
4	DF	GUA	Fredy Ruano
5	DF	GUA	Cristian Ojeda
6	DF	CUB	Yosel Piedra
7	MF	HON	Cristian Carcuz
8	MF	GUA	Néstor Grajeda
9	FW	CUB	Luis Paradela
10	FW	HON	Milton Núñez

No.	Pos.	Nation	Player
15	DF	GUA	Henry Medina
16	DF	GUA	Jimmy Barrios
18	DF	GUA	Armando Florián
25	GK	GUA	Diego Aroche
26	GK	GUA	Omar Mendoza
27	FW	JAM	Craig Foster (Jamaican footballer)
35	GK	GUA	Jaime Carbajal
32	MF	COL	Gustavo Betancur
34	DF	GUA	José Rodrigo Monterroso
—	DF	JOR	Soubhi Tantash
—	FW	MEX	Carlos Kamiani Félix

=== In ===
Note: Flags indicate national team as defined under FIFA eligibility rules; some limited exceptions apply. Players may hold more than one non-FIFA nationality.

No. / Pos. / Nation / Player; — / FW / GUA / TBA (From TBA)	No. / Pos. / Nation / Player; — / MF / GUA / TBA (From TBA)

=== Out ===
Note: Flags indicate national team as defined under FIFA eligibility rules; some limited exceptions apply. Players may hold more than one non-FIFA nationality.

No. / Pos. / Nation / Player; — / MF / GUA / Franklin García (From Sonsonate)	No. / Pos. / Nation / Player; — / MF / GUA / TBA (To TBA)

== Coaches ==
- Gustavo Faral (1999)
- Gustavo Faral (2003–05)
- Rafael Loredo (2008 – September 2010)
- Gilberto Yearwood (October 2010 – October 2012)
- Horacio Cordero (October 2012 – Nov 2014)
- Francisco Melgar (Dec 2014 – March 2015)
- Roberto Gamarra (March 2015 – September 2015)
- Ramiro Cepeda (September 2015 –)
