= C.S.D. Municipal =

Association football club in Guatemala

Municipal
- Full name: Club Social y Deportivo Municipal
- Nicknames: Los Rojos (The Reds); El Equipo del Pueblo (The People's Team); El Mimado de la Afición (Fans' Pampered Team); Diablos Rojos (Red Devils); Los Ediles (The Aediles)
- Founded: 17 May 1936; 90 years ago
- Ground: Estadio Manuel Felipe Carrera
- Capacity: 10,000
- Chairman: Gerardo Villa
- Manager: Mario Acevedo
- League: Liga Bantrab
- 2024–25: 1st of 12th
Home colours	Away colours

Club Social y Deportivo Municipal (Spanish pronunciation: [ˈkluβ soˈsjal i ðepoɾˈtiβ̞o munisiˈpal]), also known as Municipal or Los Rojos (the Reds), is a Guatemalan professional football club based in Guatemala City. They compete in the Liga Bantrab, the top tier of Guatemalan football.

The club plays their home matches at the Estadio El Trébol. As of 2015, they are the team that has remained the most years at the top level in Guatemala, having done so since the inception of the national league in 1942. They have won the domestic league 33 times, most recently winning the 2026 Clausura tournament. They won the CONCACAF Champions' Cup in 1974.

Municipal are the most popular football club in Guatemala and are traditional rivals of Comunicaciones, who are also based in Guatemala City, Municipal is the all time winningest team with 33 titles as of 2026.

== History ==
The club was founded on May 17, 1936, by workers of the Ayuntamiento (city hall) of the Guatemala City municipality, hence the name Municipal. They were first promoted to the top division, (then called Liga Capitalina) in 1938. They finished in second place in their debut season, and have since remained in the top division.

=== Early domestic success (1940s–1960s) ===
The team won its first national league title in the 1942–43 tournament, the first ever official national league championship in Guatemala. They won three of the following six tournaments, the other three being won by Tipografía Nacional, whom which they had their first known rivalry. Municipal were coached by Manuel Felipe Carrera, one of the original founders of the club, and whose name was later given to the stadium where the team currently practices.

During the 1940s and early 1950s, Municipal's most iconic player was the forward Carlos "Pepino" Toledo, who wore the red shirt throughout his career. He helped the club win their first four league titles, the last of them coming at the 1954–55 tournament (also the year Toledo retired). His career total of 129 goals remains the fourth-highest in club history. His national level talent called him to the national team. Later, he became Municipal's coach.

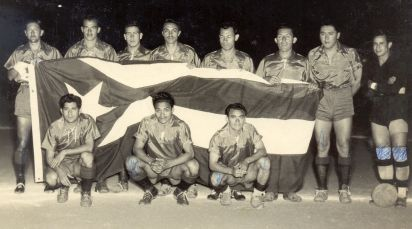
Municipal team that participated in the 1948 tournament in Cuba, holding the flag of the host country

In 1948, Municipal won its first international honors at a friendly tournament held in Havana, Cuba to commemorate the Cuban Independence. That squad featured Toledo, Mario Camposeco, and goalkeeper José Pedro "Tarzán" Segura.

The end of the 1950s were a darker time for Municipal. Toledo had retired and Comunicaciones had dethroned them at the top of the league, winning it three consecutive seasons. Municipal struggled through an eight-year title drought. They managed to break that drought with three championships in the 1960s (1963–64, 1965–66, and 1969–70), but Comunicaciones remained Guatemala's dominant team, winning seven titles in 14 years from 1956–72. The Comunicaciones-Municipal match emerged as a high-profile local derby, the biggest in the country. Another rivalry developed with a third Guatemala City club, Aurora, which also won three titles during this time.

=== 1970s: First international success ===
In 1973, Uruguayan coach Rubén Amorín arrived at Municipal. He managed a group of players that included defender Alberto López Oliva, midfielders Benjamín Monterroso and José Emilio "Pepe" Mitrovich, and forward Julio César Anderson. Anderson would become the club's highest-ever goalscorer, and help lead the team to its era of greatest glory. Municipal won league championships in both 1973 and 1974 (their first repeat titles). In 1974, the same year they were marching to a dominant repeat championship, they became the first Guatemalan club to win the CONCACAF Champions' Cup. The Rojos then went on to play the Copa Interamericana against Argentina's "red team", Independiente.

The first leg was played in Guatemala on November 24, 1974, and Independiente won, 1-0. However, Municipal surprised the continent by winning 1-0 in Argentina two days later. The hero was Argentine-born José Emilio "Pepe" Mitrovich in the second half. With both teams equal in points and goal difference, the match went to extra time. No further goals were scored, and the match went into penalty kicks. Misses by Julio César "Morocho" Anderson and Benjamín "Mincho" Monterroso allowed Independiente to prevail, 4-2, but Municipal had earned continental respect.

=== 1980s: Almost relegated ===
Municipal's glory years continued with another league title in 1976, but their results began to fade. They finished 8th in 1979-80, and in 1981 they fell even further to 11th, forcing them into a relegation mini-league. Ironically, their safety was secured when old rivals Tipografía Nacional were relegated instead. In 1982, the club came even closer to oblivion, finishing 9th in the regular season. That result put them back in the relegation mini-league, and this time they escaped only on goal differential. Over the next several years, Municipal put some distance between themselves and the bottom of the table, but they would not seriously challenge for another title until 1987.

=== 1980s and 1990s: Return to the top ===
1987 was the year that Argentine coach Miguel Ángel Brindisi arrived in Guatemala City. A former midfield star who had won two Argentine titles and played a stint in Spain, he came to Municipal with just one year of managerial experience. His two years in Guatemala saw brilliant success. In 1987, they beat Aurora 4-2 on penalties to win a championship playoff and claimed another Guatemalan title since 1976. A year later, they repeated as champs for the first time since the early 1970s. Brindisi moved on to manage Barcelona SC in Ecuador, but successor Walter Ormeño kept the momentum by guiding the team to a third consecutive title.

In 1990–91, Municipal came within one match of a fourth consecutive title, but lost 1–0 to Comunicaciones in the championship final. The team defeated Comunicaciones 2–1 in a championship playoff replay during the 1991–92 season, securing its fourth title in five years.

Municipal reached the final of the CONCACAF Champions Cup in December 1993, where the team narrowly lost to Costa Rican champions Saprissa. During the same period, it won the Guatemalan championship, marking its fifth title in seven seasons.

=== 2000s: A Decade of Success ===
In 2000, after the league's competition format was changed to two yearly tournaments on the Apertura and Clausura fashion, Municipal won the title again after Comunicaciones had set a record by winning the previous four; Municipal surpassed that record in 2006 when they won the 2006 Apertura tournament, their fifth consecutive title, under coach Enzo Trossero. They also added third and fourth Central American titles by winning the Copa Interclubes UNCAF in 2001 and 2004.

== Colours and crest ==
Initially, the team's uniform colors consisted of a red-and-black striped shirt and black shorts. The colors soon changed to the current red shirt and blue shorts for home matches, and all blue for away matches, although other colors have been used for away matches.

The club's logo is based in the emblem of the Municipalidad de Guatemala, which is itself based in the original coat of arms of the city of Santiago de los Caballeros de Guatemala, with the image of Apostle Santiago (Saint James) over the stylized scenery of the region. The team's version includes an image of the type of ball used at the time the club was founded, next to a blue and red striped canton in between the former two elements. The circular field is surrounded by the name of the team on a red background.

== Stadium ==
Throughout the years, Municipal has used the Estadio Doroteo Guamuch Flores as their home ground, sharing it with Comunicaciones since the 1950s until 1991, and again starting in 2005. Other stadiums hosted Municipal in the beginning, namely the Estadio Autonomía. The Estadio La Pedrera has been used when the Mateo Flores has not been available and houses a soup kitchen in the basement. The Estadio Manuel Felipe Carrera, also known as "Estadio El Trébol", has been the training venue for the team, and it has been occasionally used for official matches by the club; Municipal had an undefeated streak of 33 official matches in this ground from July 9, 1991, until March 7, 2008, when they lost to Deportivo Petapa 1–0 for the 2008 Clausura tournament.

== Supporters ==
Municipal is believed to have the largest fan base of all Guatemalan clubs, and that their popularity have earned them nicknames like El mimado de la afición (Fans' pampered team) and El equipo del pueblo (People's team).

== Statistics and records ==
Municipal has set a record in Guatemalan football by being the club that has spent the most consecutive seasons in the maximum division, having remained there uninterruptedly since 1938.

Juan Carlos Plata is the team's all-time top goalscorer in league matches and overall. As of the end of 2010, Plata has scored 299 league goals and 403 overall goals with Municipal, the only club he has played for.

== Honours ==
=== National ===
- Liga Guate
  - Champions (33): 1942–43, 1947, 1950–51, 1954–55, 1963–64, 1965–66, 1969–70, 1973, 1974, 1976, 1987, 1988–89, 1989–90, 1991–92, 1993–94, Clausura 2000, Apertura 2000, Apertura 2001, Clausura 2002, Apertura 2003, Apertura 2004, Clausura 2005, Apertura 2005, Clausura 2006, Apertura 2006, Clausura 2008, Apertura 2009, Clausura 2010, Apertura 2011, Clausura 2017, Apertura 2019, Clausura 2024, Clausura 2026
  - Runners-up (26): 1943, 1944–45, 1957–58, 1959–60, 1964, 1967–68, 1972, 1977–78, 1990–91, 1998–99, Apertura 1999, Apertura 2002, Clausura 2004, Apertura 2008, Clausura 2009, Apertura 2010, Clausura 2011, Clausura 2012, Apertura 2012, Clausura 2014, Apertura 2014, Clausura 2015, Apertura 2016, Apertura 2017, Apertura 2020, Clausura 2022, Clausura 2025
- Copa de Guatemala
  - Champions (8): 1960, 1967, 1969, 1994–95, 1995–96, 1998–99, 2003, 2003–04
  - Runners-up (3): 1983, 1996, 2006
- Copa Campeón de Campeones de Guatemala
  - Champions (6): 1952, 1967, 1977, 1994, 1996, 2024
  - Runners-up (4): 1955, 1961, 1992, 1995

=== International ===
==== Intercontinental ====
- Copa Interamericana
  - Runners-up (1): 1974

==== Continental ====
- CONCACAF Champions Cup
  - Champions (1): 1974
  - Runners-up (1): 1995

==== Regional ====
- Copa Fraternidad/Torneo Grandes de Centroamérica/Copa Interclubes UNCAF
  - Champions (4): 1974, 1977, 2001, 2004
  - Runners-up (1): 1998

== Players ==
=== Current squad ===
As of 24 March, 2026

Note: Flags indicate national team as defined under FIFA eligibility rules; some limited exceptions apply. Players may hold more than one non-FIFA nationality.

No.	Pos.	Nation	Player
1	GK	GUA	Braulio Linares
3	DF	CRC	José Mena
4	DF	GUA	Nicolás Samayoa
7	FW	GUA	Rudy Muñoz
8	MF	GUA	Rodrigo Saravia
9	FW	GUA	José Martínez
10	MF	GUA	Pedro Altán
11	MF	GUA	John Méndez
12	GK	GUA	Kenderson Navarro
13	DF	GUA	Carlos Estrada
16	DF	GUA	José Morales
17	MF	GUA	Elvi Elington
18	MF	GUA	Jonathan Franco
19	MF	ARG	Cristian Hernández

No.	Pos.	Nation	Player
20	MF	GUA	César Archila
21	FW	GUA	Yorman Baltazar
22	MF	GUA	Jefry Bantes
23	DF	GUA	Carlos Aguilar
24	FW	GUA	Anthony Salamá
26	MF	GUA	Rudy Barrientos
31	DF	GUA	César Calderón
32	FW	PAR	Erik López (on loan from Club Olimpia)
33	FW	ECU	Alejandro Cabeza
35	GK	GUA	David Aldana
43	MF	CUB	Yunior Pérez
52	DF	TRI	Aubrey David
99	FW	DOM	Erick Japa

=== Retired numbers ===
15 – (Guatemala) Juan Carlos Plata, forward (1990–2010)

=== In ===
Note: Flags indicate national team as defined under FIFA eligibility rules; some limited exceptions apply. Players may hold more than one non-FIFA nationality.

No.	Pos.	Nation	Player
—	FW	HON	Eddie Hernández (From Olancho FC)
—		GUA	Carlos Estrada (From TBD)
—		GUA	Cristian Hernández (From TBD)
—		GUA	Yorman Baltazar (From TBD)
—		CUB	Yunior Perez (From TBD)

No.	Pos.	Nation	Player
—		GUA	TBD (From TBD)
—		GUA	TBD (From TBD)
—		GUA	TBD (From TBD)

=== Out ===
Note: Flags indicate national team as defined under FIFA eligibility rules; some limited exceptions apply. Players may hold more than one non-FIFA nationality.

No.	Pos.	Nation	Player
—		GUA	Alejandro Galindo (To TBD)
—		GUA	Renato Sequén (To TBD)
—		ARG	Santiago Gómez (To TBD)
—		GUA	Esteban García (To TBD)

No.	Pos.	Nation	Player
—		GUA	TBD (To TBD)
—		GUA	TBD (To TBD)
—		GUA	TBD (To TBD)
—		GUA	TBD (To TBD)

== Personnel ==
=== Coaching staff ===
As of June 2025

Position	Staff
Manager	(Guatemala) Mario Acevedo (*)
Assistant Managers	(Guatemala) Dwight Pezzarossi (*)
Reserve Manager	(Guatemala) TBD (*)
Under 17 Manager	(Guatemala) TBD (*)
Ladies Manager	(Guatemala) TBD (*)
Fitness Coach	(Argentina) Ezequiel Barril (*)
Goalkeeper Coach	(Guatemala) TBD (*)
Sport Director	(Guatemala) TBD (*)
Team Doctor	(Guatemala) TBD (*)
General Physician	(Guatemala) TBD (*)
Knesliogiocal	(Guatemala) TBD (*)
Utility	(Guatemala) TBD (*)

== Notable players ==
Players with at least two years of service for the club are listed here. Former

- (Argentina) Miguel Ángel Brindisi (FW), (1984–1985)
- (Argentina) Martín Crossa (MF), (2009–2010)
- (Guatemala) José Emilio Mitrovich (MF), (1970's)
- (Costa Rica) Josimar Arias (MF), (2012)
- (Costa Rica) Rónald Gómez (MF), (1998–1999)
- (El Salvador) Eliseo Quintanilla (FW), (2011–2012)
- (El Salvador) José Luis Rugamas (MF), (1984–1986)
- (El Salvador) José Pedro "Tarzan" Segura (GK), (1946–1950)
- (Guatemala) Mario Acevedo (FW), (2001–2009)
- (Guatemala) Julio César Anderson (FW), (1969–1984)
- (Guatemala) Carlos Figueroa (MF), (2001–2003), (2004–2007), (2009–2010)
- (Guatemala) Guillermo Ramirez (FW/MF), (1997–2000), (2003–2008), (2010–2011)
- (Guatemala) Juan Manuel Funes (MF), (1986–1997)
- (Guatemala) Freddy García (MF), (2003–2004), (2004–2009)
- (Guatemala) Óscar Isaula (FW), (2011–2012)
- (Guatemala) Alberto López Oliva (DF), (1963–1978)
- (Guatemala) Benjamín Monterroso (DF / MF), (1970–1979)
- (Guatemala) Juan Carlos Plata (FW), (1989–2010)
- (Guatemala) Selvyn Ponciano (DF), (1994–2009)
- (Guatemala) Julio Rodas (FW), (1988–1994)
- (Guatemala) Sergio Guevara (MF), (2003–2011)
- (Guatemala) German Ruano (DF), (1993–2009)
- (Guatemala) Carlos Ruiz (FW), (1997–2001), (2014–2016)
- (Guatemala) Carlos Toledo (FW), (1938–1955)
- (Mexico) Pablo Hutt (MF), (2011)
- (Mexico) Juan Manuel Romo (GK), (1983–90)
- (Grenada) Kassius Ettienne (MF), (2010–2012)
- (Panama) Jaime Penedo (GK), (2007–2013)
- (Paraguay) Edgar Aguilera (MF), (2001–2002)
- (Paraguay) Richart Báez (FW), (2003–04)
- (Uruguay) Julio César Cortés (MF), (1973–1974)
- (Uruguay) Carlos Nicola (GK), (2003–2005)
- (Guatemala) Gonzalo Romero (MF), (1997–98), (2000–2011)
- (Guatemala) Guillermo Lobos (DF), (1942–1955)
- (Guatemala) Claudio Albizuris (MF), (2000–10), (2011–2017)
- (El Salvador) Jaime Alas (MF), (2016-2023)
- (Guatemala) Marco Pappa (MF), (2006–2008), (2017–2018)
- (Panama) Felipe Baloy (DF), (2017-2018)
- (Panama) Blas Perez (FW), (2017-2018)
- (Guatemala) Paulo Motta (GK), (2004–2008), (2014–2018)
- (Guatemala) Nicholas Hagen (GK), (2015–2020)

== Managerial history ==
=== Champion coaches ===
- (Guatemala) Manuel Felipe Carrera (1942–47), (1954–56)
- (Argentina) José Alberto Cevasco (1950–51)
- (Guatemala) Carlos "Pepino" Toledo (1957–61)
- (Argentina) Luis Grill Prieto (1963–64), (1970)
- (Costa Rica) Marvin Rodríguez (1965–66)
- (Uruguay) Rubén Amorín (1972–74), (1991–92)
- (Argentina) Salvador Pericullo (Copa Fraternidad Centroamericana 1977), (1976–78)
- (Argentina) Miguel Ángel Brindisi (1987–88)
- (Peru) Walter Ormeño (Campeonatos de Liga 1989–90)
- (Argentina) Horacio Cordero (1992–94 Liga), (1994 Copa Gallo), (1995 Copa Gallo), (Clausura 2000), (Apertura 2001), (Clausura 2008)
- (Czech Republic) Jan Poštulka (Torneo de copa 1998–99)
- (Paraguay) Ever Hugo Almeida (Torneo de Reordenamiento 2001), (Clausura 2002), (Apertura 2003)
- (Argentina) Enzo Trossero (Apertura 2004), (Clausura 2005), (Apertura 2005), (Clausura 2006), (Apertura 2006), (5 consecutive titles)
- (Argentina) Jorge Habegger (Apertura 2009)
- (Uruguay) Manuel Keosseian (Clausura 2010)
- (Costa Rica) Javier Delgado (Apertura 2011)
- (Uruguay) Gustavo Machaín (Clausura 2017)
- (Argentina) Sebastián Bini (Apertura 2019), (Clausura 2024)

=== List of coaches ===
- (Brazil) Jaime Borja (1957)
- (Hungary) Ferenc Mészáros (1967–1968)
- (Chile) Rolando Torino (1986)
- (Uruguay) Gustavo Faral (1996)
- (Argentina) Horacio Cordero (2000–2001)
- (Paraguay) Ever Hugo Almeida (2001–2004)
- (Argentina) Enzo Trossero (2004–2006)
- (Guatemala) Victor Hugo Monzon (Jul 2007-Oct 2007)
- (Argentina) Jorge José Benítez (Oct 2007–Apr 2008)
- (Argentina) Horacio Cordero (Apr 2008-Dec 2008)
- (Argentina) Carlos Ruiz (Jan 2009-Nov 2009)
- (Argentina) Jorge Habbegger (Nov 2009-Mar2010)
- (Uruguay) Manuel Keosseian (Apr 2010-Jun 2010)
- (Portugal) Guilherme Farinha (2010)
- (Costa Rica) Javier Delgado (May 2011–Oct 2012)
- (Honduras) Ramón Maradiaga (Oct 2012–Feb 2013)
- (Chile) Fernando Díaz (Feb 2013–Dec 2013)
- (Uruguay) Aníbal Ruiz (Dec 2013–Sept 2014)
- (Uruguay) Manuel Keosseián (Oct 2014–Dec 2014)
- (Argentina) Enzo Trossero (Jan 2015–May 2015)
- (Costa Rica) Mauricio Wright (Jul 2015–Nov 2015)
- (Uruguay) Gustavo Machain (Nov 2015–Oct 2017)
- (Paraguay) Ever Hugo Almeida (Oct 2017–Dec 2017)
- (Costa Rica) Hernán Medford (Jan 2018–Sep 2018)
- (Argentina) Horacio Cordero (Sep 2018-Sep 2019)
- (Argentina) Sebastián Bini (Sep 2019-May 2021)
- (Paraguay) José Cardozo (May 2021-May 2022)
- (Mexico) Juan Antonio Torres (Jun 2022-Oct 2022)
- (Paraguay) José Cardozo (Oct 2022-May 2023)
- (Argentina) Sebastián Bini (May 2023-May 2025)
- (Guatemala) Mario Acevedo (June 2025-Present)
