= Puerto Rico national football team results =

This is a list of the Puerto Rico national football team results from 2008 to the present day.

== Record by opponent ==
| Team | Pld | W | D | L | GF | GA | GD | WPCT |
|---|---|---|---|---|---|---|---|---|
| Andorra | 0 | 0 | 0 | 0 | 0 | 0 | 0 | — |
| Anguilla | 5 | 5 | 0 | 0 | 21 | 3 | +18 | 100.00 |
| Antigua and Barbuda | 4 | 3 | 0 | 1 | 10 | 3 | +7 | 75.00 |
| Aruba | 4 | 2 | 1 | 1 | 10 | 7 | +3 | 50.00 |
| Bahamas | 5 | 5 | 0 | 0 | 26 | 3 | +23 | 100.00 |
| Barbados | 3 | 2 | 0 | 1 | 2 | 2 | 0 | 66.67 |
| Belize | 3 | 0 | 1 | 2 | 1 | 5 | −4 | 0.00 |
| Bermuda | 5 | 3 | 1 | 1 | 6 | 5 | +1 | 60.00 |
| British Virgin Islands | 5 | 2 | 1 | 2 | 10 | 8 | +2 | 40.00 |
| Canada | 3 | 0 | 1 | 2 | 0 | 6 | −6 | 0.00 |
| Cayman Islands | 7 | 7 | 0 | 0 | 19 | 1 | +18 | 100.00 |
| Colombia | 2 | 0 | 0 | 2 | 2 | 9 | −7 | 0.00 |
| Costa Rica | 1 | 0 | 0 | 1 | 0 | 13 | −13 | 0.00 |
| Cuba | 4 | 0 | 1 | 3 | 1 | 19 | −18 | 0.00 |
| Curaçao | 2 | 0 | 1 | 1 | 4 | 6 | −2 | 0.00 |
| Dominica | 1 | 1 | 0 | 0 | 2 | 0 | +2 | 100.00 |
| Dominican Republic | 12 | 3 | 3 | 6 | 11 | 23 | −12 | 25.00 |
| El Salvador | 4 | 0 | 2 | 2 | 2 | 10 | −8 | 0.00 |
| Grenada | 8 | 1 | 2 | 5 | 9 | 18 | −9 | 12.50 |
| Guadeloupe | 6 | 0 | 0 | 6 | 2 | 23 | −21 | 0.00 |
| Guam | 1 | 1 | 0 | 0 | 4 | 0 | +4 | 100.00 |
| Guatemala | 4 | 0 | 0 | 4 | 2 | 15 | −13 | 0.00 |
| Guyana | 6 | 2 | 0 | 4 | 6 | 8 | −2 | 33.33 |
| Haiti | 7 | 0 | 0 | 7 | 4 | 27 | −23 | 0.00 |
| Honduras | 3 | 0 | 1 | 2 | 2 | 10 | −8 | 0.00 |
| India | 1 | 0 | 0 | 1 | 1 | 4 | −3 | 0.00 |
| Indonesia | 1 | 0 | 1 | 0 | 0 | 0 | 0 | 0.00 |
| Jamaica | 7 | 0 | 0 | 7 | 3 | 17 | −14 | 0.00 |
| Martinique | 7 | 1 | 0 | 6 | 8 | 19 | −11 | 14.29 |
| Mexico | 4 | 0 | 0 | 4 | 0 | 21 | −21 | 0.00 |
| Nicaragua | 6 | 1 | 2 | 3 | 7 | 9 | −2 | 16.67 |
| Panama | 7 | 1 | 1 | 5 | 3 | 23 | −20 | 14.29 |
| Saudi Arabia | 1 | 0 | 0 | 1 | 0 | 3 | −3 | 0.00 |
| Sint Maarten | 2 | 2 | 0 | 0 | 5 | 1 | +4 | 100.00 |
| Spain | 1 | 0 | 0 | 1 | 1 | 2 | −1 | 0.00 |
| Saint Kitts and Nevis | 6 | 0 | 2 | 4 | 3 | 5 | −2 | 0.00 |
| Saint Lucia | 2 | 2 | 0 | 0 | 7 | 0 | +7 | 100.00 |
| Saint Vincent and the Grenadines | 3 | 1 | 0 | 2 | 3 | 10 | −7 | 33.33 |
| Sint Maarten | 1 | 0 | 0 | 1 | 2 | 3 | −1 | 0.00 |
| Suriname | 3 | 0 | 2 | 1 | 1 | 2 | −1 | 0.00 |
| Trinidad and Tobago | 4 | 0 | 2 | 2 | 3 | 12 | −9 | 0.00 |
| United States | 1 | 0 | 0 | 1 | 1 | 3 | −2 | 0.00 |
| U.S. Virgin Islands | 1 | 1 | 0 | 0 | 2 | 0 | +2 | 100.00 |
| Venezuela | 4 | 0 | 1 | 3 | 1 | 12 | −11 | 0.00 |
| Total | 167 | 46 | 26 | 95 | 207 | 370 | −163 | 27.54 |

Updated to match(es) played on 5 June 2026. Source: Results

=== Record by Club ===
| Club | League | Pld | W | D | L | GF | GA | GD |
|---|---|---|---|---|---|---|---|---|
| Hartford Athletic | (United States) MLS | 1 | 0 | 0 | 1 | 1 | 5 | -4 |
| New York City FC | (United States) MLS | 1 | 0 | 0 | 1 | 1 | 2 | -1 |
| Orlando City SC | (United States) MLS | 1 | 0 | 0 | 1 | 1 | 6 | -5 |

=== 2008 ===
| Wins | Losses | Draws |
|---|---|---|
| 3 | 1 | 2 |

| 16 January Friendly | Bermuda | 0–2 | Puerto Rico | Devonshire Parish, Bermuda |
| | | | Graham 47'; Cabrero 67' | Stadium: Bermuda National Stadium |

| 19 January Friendly | Bermuda | 0–1 | Puerto Rico | Devonshire Parish, Bermuda |
| | | | Delgado 13' | Stadium: Bermuda National Stadium |

| 26 January Friendly | Puerto Rico | 2–2 | Trinidad and Tobago | Bayamón, Puerto Rico |
| | Low 15'; Megaloudis 33' | | Baptiste 57' (pen.); Power 70' | Stadium: Juan Ramon Loubriel Stadium |

| 26 March 2010 FIFA WCQ | Puerto Rico | 1–0 | Dominican Republic | Bayamón, Puerto Rico |
| 20:00 UTC−4 | Villegas 96' (pen.) | Report | | Stadium: Juan Ramon Loubriel Stadium; Attendance: 8,000; Referee: Mauricio Morales (Mexico) |

| 4 June 2010 FIFA WCQ | Honduras | 4–0 | Puerto Rico | San Pedro Sula, Honduras |
| 20:30 UTC−6 | de León 25'; Palacios 51'; Suazo 52', 90+2' | Report | | Stadium: Estadio Olímpico Metropolitano; Attendance: 20,000; Referee: Courtney Campbell (Jamaica) |

| 14 June 2010 FIFA WCQ | Puerto Rico | 2–2 | Honduras | Bayamón, Puerto Rico |
| 20:00 UTC−4 | Megaloudis 32'; Villegas 41' | Report | Suazo 23'; Palacios 52' | Stadium: Estadio Juan Ramón Loubriel; Attendance: 5,000; Referee: Walter Lopez Castellanos (Guatemala) |

=== 2011 ===
| Wins | Losses | Draws |
|---|---|---|
| 2 | 1 | 3 |

| 2 September 2014 FIFA WCQ | Saint Kitts and Nevis | 0–0 | Puerto Rico | Basseterre, St. Kitts and Nevis |
| 20:00 UTC−4 | | Report | | Stadium: Warner Park, Attendance: 2,500; Referee: Ricardo Arellano (Mexico) |

| 6 September 2014 FIFA WCQ | Puerto Rico | 0–3 | Canada | Bayamón, Puerto Rico |
| 20:00 UTC−4 | | Report | Hume 42'; Jackson 84'; Ricketts 90+3' | Stadium: Estadio Juan Ramón Loubriel; Attendance: 4,000; Referee: Enrico Wijngaarde (Suriname) |

| 7 October 2014 FIFA WCQ | Puerto Rico | 1–1 | Saint Kitts and Nevis | Bayamón, Puerto Rico |
| 20:00 UTC−4 | Cabrero 37' | Report | Lake 59' | Stadium: Estadio Juan Ramón Loubriel; Attendance: 2,500; Referee: Neal Brizan (Trinidad and Tobago) |

| 11 October 2014 FIFA WCQ | Canada | 0–0 | Puerto Rico | Toronto, Canada |
| 19:00 UTC−4 | | Report | | Stadium: BMO Field; Attendance: 12,178; Referee: Stanley Lancaster (Guyana) |

| 11 November 2014 FIFA WCQ | Saint Lucia | 0–4 | Puerto Rico | Bayamón, Puerto Rico |
| 20:00 UTC−4 | | Report | Arrieta 4'; Ramos 14', 46'; Cabrero 54' | Stadium: Estadio Juan Ramón Loubriel; Attendance: 350; Referee: Kenville Holder (Cayman Islands) |

| 14 November 2014 FIFA WCQ | Puerto Rico | 3–0 | Saint Lucia | Mayagüez, Puerto Rico |
| 20:00 UTC−4 | Ramos 13', 85'; Marrero 87' | Report | | Stadium: Mayagüez Athletics Stadium, Mayagüez; Attendance: 1,050; Referee: Bryan Willett (Antigua and Barbuda) |

=== 2012 ===
| Wins | Losses | Draws |
|---|---|---|
| 3 | 7 | 1 |

| 23 February Friendly | Nicaragua | 1–0 | Puerto Rico | Managua, Nicaragua |
| | Vega 88' | Report | | Stadium: Nicaragua National Football Stadium |

| 26 February Friendly | Nicaragua | 4–1 | Puerto Rico | Managua, Nicaragua |
| | Vega 41'; Villanueva 73', 78'; Zeledón 90+1' | Report | Arrieta 10' | Stadium: Nicaragua National Football Stadium |

| 31 May Friendly | Puerto Rico | 3–1 | Nicaragua | Bayamón, Puerto Rico |
| | Arrieta 39'; Cabrero 62'; Hansen 83' | Report | Barrera 90+1' | Stadium: Bayamón Soccer Compex; Referee: William Anderson (Puerto Rico) |

| 2 June Friendly | Puerto Rico | 1–1 | Nicaragua | Bayamón, Puerto Rico |
| | Hansen 61' | Report | Pavón 79' | Stadium: Bayamón Soccer Compex; Referee: Javier Santos (Puerto Rico) |

| 15 August Friendly | Puerto Rico | 1–2 | Spain | Bayamón, Puerto Rico |
| 22:30 CEST; 16:30 Local time | Cintron 65' | Report | Cazorla 42'; Fàbregas 45' | Stadium: Juan Ramón Loubriel Stadium; Attendance: 7,500; Referee: Javier Santos (Puerto Rico) |

| 7 September 2012 Caribbean Cup Q | Bermuda | 1–2 | Puerto Rico | Port-au-Prince, Haiti |
| | Russell 78' | Report | Marrero 68'; Ramos 90+5' | Stadium: Stade Sylvio Cator; Attendance: 2,000; Referee: Trevor Taylor (Saint Vincent and the Grenadines) |

| 9 September 2012 Caribbean Cup Q | Puerto Rico | 9–0 | Saint Martin | Port-au-Prince, Haiti |
| | Ramos 15', 44', 47', 88'; Delgado 29'; Arrieta 45+1'; Marrero 69', 83'; Oikkonen 76' | Report | | Stadium: Stade Sylvio Cator; Attendance: 2,000; Referee: Dwight Royal (Jamaica) |

| 12 September 2012 Caribbean Cup Q | Haiti | 2–1 | Puerto Rico | Port-au-Prince, Haiti |
| | Russell 65'; Maurice 67' | Report | Delgado 73' | Stadium: Stade Sylvio Cator; Attendance: 12,000; Referee: Kevin Morrison (Saint Vincent and the Grenadines) |

| 23 October 2012 Caribbean Cup Q | Martinique | 2–1 | Puerto Rico | Les Abymes, Guadeloupe |
| 18:00 UTC−4 | Sabin 38' (pen.), 43' | Report | Ramos 55' | Stadium: Stade René Serge Nabajoth; Attendance: 100; Referee: Ignatius Baptiste (Dominica) |

| 25 October 2012 Caribbean Cup Q | Guadeloupe | 4–1 | Puerto Rico | Les Abymes, Guadeloupe |
| 20:00 UTC−4 | Loval 8'; Mocka 11', 26'; Pascal 69' | Report | Ramos 83' | Stadium: Stade René Serge Nabajoth; Attendance: 1,500; Referee: Daniel Leslie (Dominica) |

| 27 October 2012 Caribbean Cup Q | Puerto Rico | 1–3 | Dominican Republic | Les Abymes, Guadeloupe |
| 17:00 UTC−4 | Vélez 80' | Report | Faña 19', 70'; Ulloa 86' | Stadium: Stade René Serge Nabajoth; Attendance: 3,000; Referee: Caswell Cambridge (Saint Vincent and the Grenadines) |

=== 2014 ===
| Wins | Losses | Draws |
|---|---|---|
| 0 | 1 | 2 |

| 3 September 2014 Caribbean Cup Q | Puerto Rico | 2–2 | Curaçao | Bayamón, Puerto Rico |
| | Marrero 7', 51' | Report | Mathilda 59'; Martis 82' | Stadium: Juan Ramón Loubriel Stadium; Attendance: 2,000; Referee: John Pitti (Panama) |

| 5 September 2014 Caribbean Cup Q | Puerto Rico | 1–2 | French Guiana | Bayamón, Puerto Rico |
| | Ramos 39' (pen.) | Report | Gab. Pigrée 60', 90' | Stadium: Juan Ramón Loubriel Stadium; Attendance: 3,200; Referee: Edvin Jurisevic (United States) |

| 7 September 2014 Caribbean Cup Q | Puerto Rico | 2–2 | Grenada | Bayamón, Puerto Rico |
| | Ramos 29'; Oikkonen 68' | Report | James 55'; Bain 85' | Stadium: Juan Ramón Loubriel Stadium; Attendance: 4,000; Referee: Moeth Gaymes (Saint Vincent and the Grenadines) |

=== 2015 ===
| Wins | Losses | Draws |
|---|---|---|
| 1 | 3 | 1 |

| 30 March Friendly | Puerto Rico | 0–3 | Canada | Bayamón, Puerto Rico |
| | | Report | Ricketts 42'; Edwini-Bonsu 60'; Larin 77' | Stadium: Juan Ramón Loubriel Stadium; Attendance: 8,952; Referee: Sandy Vasquez (Dominican Republic) |

| 6 June Friendly | Bermuda | 1–1 | Puerto Rico | Devonshire Parish, Bermuda |
| | Simmons 10' | Report | D'Andrea 25' | Stadium: Bermuda National Stadium |

| 12 June 2018 FIFA WCQ | Puerto Rico | 1–0 | Grenada | Bayamón, Puerto Rico |
| | Bozkurt 17' | Report (FIFA); Report (CONCACAF) | | Stadium: Juan Ramón Loubriel Stadium; Referee: Christopher Reid (Belize) |

| 16 June 2018 FIFA WCQ | Grenada | 2–0 | Puerto Rico | St. George's, Grenada |
| | Morales 35' (o.g.); Ja. Charles 82' | Report (FIFA); Report (CONCACAF) | | Stadium: Grenada National Stadium; Referee: Adrian Skeete (Barbados) |

| 11 December Non FIFA 'A' match | Puerto Rico | 1–2 | (United States) New York City FC | Bayamón, Puerto Rico |
| 20:00 AST (UTC−04:00) | Hurtado 66' (o.g.) | Report | Arrieta 7' (o.g.); Poku 90+1' | Stadium: Juan Ramón Loubriel Stadium |

=== 2016 ===
| Wins | Losses | Draws |
|---|---|---|
| 2 | 7 | 1 |

| 26 March 2017 Caribbean Cup Q | Anguilla | 0–4 | Puerto Rico | The Valley, Anguilla |
| | | Report | Coca 16', 53'; Rivera 42'; Ortiz 62' | Stadium: Raymond E. Guishard Technical Centre; Referee: Moeth Gaymes (Saint Vincent and the Grenadines) |

| 29 March 2017 Caribbean Cup Q | Puerto Rico | 0–1 | Guyana | Bayamón, Puerto Rico |
| | | Report | Austin 60' | Stadium: Juan Ramón Loubriel Stadium; Referee: Rodphin Harris (Trinidad and Tobago) |

| 22 May Friendly | Puerto Rico | 1–3 | United States | Bayamón, Puerto Rico |
| | Betancur 41' | Report | Ream 20'; Wood 34'; Arriola 55' | Stadium: Juan Ramón Loubriel Stadium; Referee: Kimball Ward (Saint Kitts and Nevis) |

| 1 June 2017 Caribbean Cup Q | Grenada | 3–3 (a.e.t.) (3–4 p) | Puerto Rico | St. George's, Grenada |
| | John-Brown 3', 27'; Phillip 38' | Report | Ramos 44' (pen.), 54'; Ortiz 86' | Stadium: Grenada National Stadium; Referee: Wilson Da Costa (Bahamas) |
| | Penalties |
| | J. Rennie (penalty scored); George (penalty scored); Andall (penalty scored); Phillip (penalty missed); Charles (penalty missed) | | (penalty scored) Ramos; (penalty scored) Rivera; (penalty scored) Sánchez; (penalty scored) Ortiz |

| 4 June 2017 Caribbean Cup Q | Puerto Rico | 2–1 (a.e.t.) | Antigua and Barbuda | Bayamón, Puerto Rico |
| | Ramos 5', 115' | Report | Blackstock 35' | Stadium: Juan Ramón Loubriel Stadium; Referee: Sandy Vásquez (Dominican Republic) |

Carlos García Cantarero was named head coach on June 29, 2016.

| 28 August Non FIFA 'A' match | Dominican Republic | 5–0 | Puerto Rico | San Cristóbal, Dominican Republic |
| | Rodríguez 18'; Faña 38'; Peralta 69', 83'; Espinal 76' | | | Stadium: Estadio Panamericano |

| 30 August Friendly | Puerto Rico | 0–1 | Dominican Republic | Bayamón, Puerto Rico |
| | | Report | Cabán 12' (o.g.) | Stadium: Juan Ramón Loubriel Stadium; Referee: Javier Santos (Puerto Rico) |

| 3 September Friendly | India | 4–1 | Puerto Rico | Mumbai, India |
| 20:00 | Das 18'; Chhetri 26'; Lalpekhlua 34'; J. Singh 58' | Report | Sanchez 8' (pen.) | Stadium: Mumbai Football Arena |

| 8 October 2017 Caribbean Cup Q | Antigua and Barbuda | 2–0 | Puerto Rico | Saint John's, Antigua and Barbuda |
| | Byers 43'; Smith 86' | Report | | Stadium: Antigua Recreation Ground |

| 11 October 2017 Caribbean Cup Q | Puerto Rico | 2–4 (a.e.t.) | Curaçao | Bayamón, Puerto Rico |
| | H. Ramos 16'; M. Ramos 27' | Report | Janga 69'; Bacuna 85', 120+1'; Zschusschen 97' | Stadium: Juan Ramón Loubriel Stadium |

=== 2017 ===
| Wins | Losses | Draws |
|---|---|---|
| 0 | 1 | 1 |

| 16 March Friendly | Nicaragua | Cancelled | Puerto Rico | Estelí, Nicaragua |
| | | Report | | Stadium: Estadio Independencia |

| 13 June Friendly | Indonesia | 0–0 | Puerto Rico | Sleman, Indonesia |
| 21:45 UTC+07 | | Report | | Stadium: Maguwoharjo Stadium; Referee: Sukhbir Singh (Singapore) |

| 4 November Non FIFA 'A' match | Orlando City SC (United States) | 6–1 | Puerto Rico | Orlando, Florida |
| 7:30 pm EST | Dwyer 39'; Larin 59', 90+1'; Barry 69'; Hines 79'; Rocha 86' | Report | Cabán 19' | Stadium: Orlando City Stadium; Attendance: 8,231 |
Note: Fundraiser for Puerto Rico Relief in aftermath of Hurricane Maria; Kaka's final match for Orlando City

=== 2018 ===
| Wins | Losses | Draws |
|---|---|---|
| 0 | 3 | 0 |

Amado Guevara was named head coach on June 7, 2018.

| 9 September 2019–20 Nations League Q | Saint Kitts and Nevis | 1–0 | Puerto Rico | Basseterre, St. Kitts and Nevis |
| 20:00 | Panayiotou 90+1' | Report | | Stadium: Warner Park; Referee: Johannes Dolaini (Suriname) |

| 13 October 2019–20 Nations League Q | Puerto Rico | 0–1 | Martinique | Bayamón, Puerto Rico |
| 15:00 | | Report | Parsemain 47' | Stadium: Estadio Juan Ramón Loubriel; Attendance: 2,756; Referee: Héctor Francisco Rodríguez (Honduras) |

| 16 November 2019–20 Nations League Q | Belize | 1–0 | Puerto Rico | Belmopan, Belize |
| 21:00 | Casey 31' | Report | | Stadium: Isidoro Beaton Stadium; Referee: Nitzar Sandoval (Nicaragua) |

=== 2019 ===
| Wins | Losses | Draws |
|---|---|---|
| 2 | 5 | 0 |

| 24 March 2019–20 Nations League Q | Puerto Rico | 0–2 | Grenada | Bayamón, Puerto Rico |
| 16:00 | | Report | German 27'; Paterson 74' | Stadium: Juan Ramón Loubriel Stadium; Referee: Trevester Richards (Saint Kitts and Nevis) |

Elgy Morales was named head coach on May 25, 2019.

| 17 August Non FIFA 'A' match | Hartford Athletic | 5–1 | Puerto Rico | Hartford, United States |
| | Wojcik 25'; Davey (yellow card) 54'; Angulo 58'; Jørgensen 68'; Dalgaard 72'; Bedoya 86' | Report | Díaz 27'; Cardona (yellow card) 57' | Stadium: Dillon Stadium; Attendance: 4,685 |

| 5 September Friendly | Honduras | 4–0 | Puerto Rico | Tegucigalpa, Honduras |
| 20:00 | Izaguirre 5'; Benguche 40', 62'; Toro 59' | Report | | Stadium: Estadio Tiburcio Carías Andino |

| 10 September 2019–20 Nations League | Puerto Rico | 0–5 | Guatemala | Mayagüez, Puerto Rico |
| 21:00 | | Report | Ceballos 30' (pen.); Guerra 54' (pen.); Galindo 61' (pen.); Robles 66'; De León 89' | Stadium: Mayagüez Athletics Stadium; Referee: Ismael Cornejo (El Salvador) |

| 15 October 2019–20 Nations League | Anguilla | 2–3 | Puerto Rico | The Valley, Anguilla |
| 20:00 | Lake-Bryan 76'; Guishard 89' | Report | Ferrer 39'; Padron 44'; Díaz 54' | Stadium: Raymond E. Guishard Technical Centre; Referee: Ricangel de Leça (Aruba) |

| 16 November 2019–20 Nations League | Guatemala | 5–0 | Puerto Rico | Guatemala City, Guatemala |
| 20:00 | Gallardo 3'; Galindo 19' (pen.); Cincotta 45'; Álvarez 56'; Martínez 82' | Report | | Stadium: Estadio Doroteo Guamuch Flores; Attendance: 10,000; Referee: Nelson Salgado (Honduras) |

| 19 November 2019–20 Nations League | Puerto Rico | 3–0 | Anguilla | Bayamón, Puerto Rico |
| 17:00 | Rivera 56', 67' (pen.); Vega 82' | Report | | Stadium: Juan Ramón Loubriel Stadium; Referee: Ariel Sánchez (Panama) |

=== 2021 ===
| Wins | Losses | Draws |
|---|---|---|
| 3 | 2 | 1 |

| 19 January Friendly | Dominican Republic | 0–1 | Puerto Rico | Santo Domingo, Dominican Republic |
| 17:00 | | Report | Rivera 45+1' (pen.) | Stadium: Estadio Olímpico Félix Sánchez; Referee: Randy Encarnación (Dominican Republic) |

| 22 January Friendly | Guatemala | 1–0 | Puerto Rico | Guatemala City, Guatemala |
| 16:00 | Lom 67' | Report | | Stadium: Estadio Doroteo Guamuch Flores; Referee: Bryan López (Guatemala) |

Dave Sarachan was named head coach on February 24, 2023.

| 24 March 2022 FIFA WCQ | Saint Kitts and Nevis | 1–0 | Puerto Rico | San Cristóbal, Dominican Republic |
| 16:00 | Nelson 42' | Report | | Stadium: Estadio Panamericano; Referee: Randy Encarnacion Solano (Dominican Republic) |

| 28 March 2022 FIFA WCQ | Puerto Rico | 1–1 | Trinidad and Tobago | Mayagüez, Puerto Rico |
| 17:00 | R. Rivera 71' | Report | Jones 54' | Stadium: Mayagüez Athletics Stadium; Referee: Adonai Escobedo (Mexico) |

| 2 June 2022 FIFA WCQ | Puerto Rico | 7–0 | Bahamas | Mayagüez, Puerto Rico |
| 19:30 | Díaz 3'; R. Rivera 13', 43' (pen.); Angking 31'; Vega 62'; Servania 66'; Hayes 90+2' | Report | | Stadium: Mayagüez Athletics Stadium; Referee: Tori Penso (United States) |

| 8 June 2022 FIFA WCQ | Guyana | 0–2 | Puerto Rico | Georgetown, Guyana |
| 16:00 | | Report | R. Rivera 12'; Angking 25' (pen.) | Stadium: Georgetown Football Stadium; Referee: Ismael Cornejo Meléndez (El Salvador) |

=== 2022 ===
| Wins | Losses | Draws |
|---|---|---|
| 2 | 0 | 0 |

| 9 June 2022–23 Nations League | Cayman Islands | 0–3 | Puerto Rico | George Town, Cayman Islands |
| 18:00 UTC−5 | | Report | Angking 23', 64' (pen.); Valentin 84' | Stadium: Truman Bodden Sports Complex; Referee: Sergio Reyna (Guatemala) |

| 12 June 2022–23 Nations League | Puerto Rico | 6–0 | British Virgin Islands | Mayagüez, Puerto Rico |
| 18:00 UTC−4 | Ríos 12'; Rivera 15', 39', 49', 51'; Díaz 31' | Report | | Stadium: Estadio Centroamericano; Referee: Germán Martínez (El Salvador) |

| 22 September Friendly | Puerto Rico | Cancelled | Dominican Republic | Westchester, United States |
| UTC−4 | | | | Stadium: Riccardo Silva Stadium |

=== 2023 ===
| Wins | Losses | Draws |
|---|---|---|
| 6 | 3 | 2 |

Charlie Trout was named head coach on March 19, 2023.

| 23 March 2022–23 Nations League | British Virgin Islands | 1–3 | Puerto Rico | Road Town, British Virgin Islands |
| 15:00 UTC−4 | T. Forbes 36' (pen.) | Report | Antonetti 44'; Vega 46'; Silva 90+4' | Stadium: A. O. Shirley Recreation Ground; Referee: Reon Radix (Grenada) |

| 26 March 2022–23 Nations League | Puerto Rico | 5–1 | Cayman Islands | Bayamón, Puerto Rico |
| 18:00 UTC−4 | Rivera 2', 70'; Díaz 40'; Burgos 89', 90+2' | Report | Studenhofft 85' | Stadium: Estadio Juan Ramón Loubriel; Referee: Katja Koroleva (United States) |

| 13 June Friendly | Curaçao | 0–0 | Puerto Rico | Fort Lauderdale, United States |
| 21:00 UTC−4 | | Report | | Stadium: DRV PNK Stadium |

| 17 June 2023 Gold Cup qualification | Suriname | 0–0 (3–4 p) | Puerto Rico | Fort Lauderdale, United States |
| 20:20 UTC−4 | | Report | | Stadium: DRV PNK Stadium; Referee: Joseph Dickerson (United States) |
| | Penalties |
| | Chery (penalty scored); Jozefzoon (penalty scored); Pinas (penalty missed); te Vrede (penalty missed); Abena (penalty scored) | | (penalty scored) R. Rivera; (penalty missed) Servania; (penalty scored) Antonetti; (penalty scored) Ydrach; (penalty scored) G. Díaz |
Note: Puerto Rico advance on penalties 4–3

| 20 June 2023 Gold Cup qualification | Martinique | 2–0 | Puerto Rico | Fort Lauderdale, United States |
| 20:00 UTC−4 | Labeau 52'; Fortuné 90+5' | Report | | Stadium: DRV PNK Stadium; Referee: Rubiel Vázquez (United States) |
Note: Martinique advance to 2023 CONCACAF Gold Cup

| 9 September 2023–24 Nations League | Bahamas | 1–6 | Puerto Rico | Nassau, Bahamas |
| 18:00 UTC−4 | Rahming 2' | Report | Díaz 6'; Rivera 14'; Burgos 35', 86', 89'; Sulia 42' | Stadium: Thomas Robinson Stadium; Referee: Julio Luna (Guatemala) |

| 12 September 2023–24 Nations League | Puerto Rico | 5–0 | Antigua and Barbuda | Nassau, Bahamas |
| 19:00 UTC−4 | Díaz 15', 46', 90'; Rivera 39' (pen.), 43' | Report | | Stadium: Thomas Robinson Stadium; Referee: Melvin Matamoros (Honduras) |

| 14 October 2023–24 Nations League | Puerto Rico | 1–3 | Guyana | Añasco, Puerto Rico |
| 15:00 UTC−4 | Antonetti 11' | Report | Glasgow 60' (pen.); Benjamin 63'; Moore 85' | Stadium: Centro de Desarrollo de Fútbol del Oeste; Referee: Ismael Cornejo (El Salvador) |

| 17 October 2023–24 Nations League | Guyana | 3–1 | Puerto Rico | Basseterre, Saint Kitts and Nevis |
| 16:00 UTC−4 | Moriah-Welsh 48'; Moore 76'; Glasgow 85' | Report | Díaz 41' | Stadium: SKNFA Technical Center; Referee: Sergio Rozenhout (Suriname) |

| 18 November 2023–24 Nations League | Antigua and Barbuda | 2–3 | Puerto Rico | Piggotts, Antigua and Barbuda |
| 15:00 UTC−4 | Pereira 52'; Deterville 54' | Report | W. Rivera 7', 58'; Ríos 33' | Stadium: ABFA Technical Center; Referee: Benjamin Whitty (Cayman Islands) |

| 21 November 2023–24 Nations League | Puerto Rico | 6–1 | Bahamas | Bayamón, Puerto Rico |
| 20:00 UTC−4 | R. Rivera 2', 6', 19'; Ríos 39'; Díaz 74'; W. Rivera 77' (pen.) | Report | Joseph 53' | Stadium: Juan Ramón Loubriel Stadium; Referee: Steffon Dewar (Jamaica) |

=== 2024 ===
| Wins | Losses | Draws |
|---|---|---|
| 4 | 4 | 2 |

| 21 March Friendly | Belize | 1–1 | Puerto Rico | Belmopan, Belize |
| 19:30 UTC−6 | Bernárdez 6' | Report | Ríos 20' | Stadium: FFB Stadium; Referee: Melissa Borjas (Honduras) |

| 24 March Friendly | Belize | 3–0 | Puerto Rico | Belmopan, Belize |
| 18:00 UTC−6 | Salazar 43'; Moss 55'; Martínez 74' | Report | | Stadium: FFB Stadium; Referee: Ignacio Fuentes (Guatemala) |

| 6 June 2026 FIFA World Cup qualification | El Salvador | 0–0 | Puerto Rico | San Salvador, El Salvador |
| 20:30 UTC−6 | | Report | | Stadium: Estadio Cuscatlán; Referee: Saíd Martínez (Honduras) |

| 11 June 2026 FIFA World Cup qualification | Puerto Rico | 8–0 | Anguilla | Bayamón, Puerto Rico |
| 20:00 UTC−6 | de León 20' (pen.) 51'; Ydrach 31'; W. Rivera 48' 65'; L. Antonetti 59'; Ríos 71'; Cardona 90+1' | Report | | Stadium: Juan Ramon Loubriel Stadium; Referee: Oshane Nation (Jamaica) |

| 6 September 2024–25 Nations League | Puerto Rico | 1–4 | Haiti | Mayagüez, Puerto Rico |
| 20:00 UTC−4 | G. Díaz 28' | Report | Jean Jacques 50'; Pierrot 59'; Louicius 76'; Nazon 83' | Stadium: Estadio Centroamericano de Mayagüez; Referee: Filip Dujic (Canada) |

| 9 September 2024–25 Nations League | Aruba | 0–1 | Puerto Rico | Mayagüez, Puerto Rico |
| 20:00 UTC−4 | | Report | Antonetti 73' | Stadium: Estadio Centroamericano de Mayagüez; Referee: Kimbell Ward (St. Kitts and Nevis) |

| 11 October 2024–25 Nations League | Sint Maarten | 3–2 | Puerto Rico | Oranjestad, Aruba |
| 16:00 UTC−4 | Amatkarijo 44', 85' (pen.); Kort 49' | Report | Sulia 2'; A. Díaz 90+5' | Stadium: Trinidad Stadium; Attendance: 19; Referee: Benjamin Pineda (Costa Rica) |

| 14 October 2024–25 Nations League | Puerto Rico | 2–1 | Sint Maarten | Oranjestad, Aruba |
| 16:00 UTC−4 | G. Díaz 45'; R. Rivera 83' (pen.) | Report | Christina 54' | Stadium: Trinidad Stadium; Referee: Moeth Gaymes (Saint Vincent and the Grenadines) |

| 15 November 2024–25 Nations League | Puerto Rico | 5–1 | Aruba | Mayagüez, Puerto Rico |
| 18:00 UTC−4 | R. Rivera 7'; N. Hernandez 23'; D. Ríos 55'; J. Servania 62'; A. Díaz 81' | Report | J. Jiménez 21' | Stadium: Estadio Centroamericano de Mayagüez; Referee: Fernando Morón (Panama) |

| 18 November 2024–25 Nations League | Haiti | 3–0 | Puerto Rico | Mayagüez, Puerto Rico |
| 21:00 UTC−4 | Attys 29'; Louicius 53'; Pierrot 70' | | | Stadium: Estadio Centroamericano de Mayagüez; Referee: Rubiel Vázquez (United States) |

=== 2025 ===
| Wins | Losses | Draws |
|---|---|---|
| 1 | 3 | 2 |

| 21 March Friendly | Puerto Rico | 2–2 | Dominican Republic | Bayamon, Puerto Rico |
| 20:00 UTC−4 | Rivera 21'; Sulia 90+3' | | Dollenmayer 45+3'; Vásquez 58' | Stadium: Estadio Juan Ramón Loubriel |

| 25 March Friendly | Dominican Republic | 2–0 | Puerto Rico | Santiago, Dominican Republic |
| | | | | Stadium: Estadio Cibao FC |

| 1 June Friendly | Puerto Rico | 1–1 | Nicaragua | Pawtucket, United States |
| | Ríos 10' | Report | Hernández 60' | Stadium: Centreville Bank Stadium |

| 6 June 2026 FIFA World Cup qualification | Suriname | 1-0 | Puerto Rico | Paramaribo, Suriname |
| 19:00 UTC−3 | Montnor 79' | Report | | Stadium: Dr. Franklin Essed Stadium; Attendance: 3,300; Referee: Nelson Salgado (Honduras) |

| 10 June 2026 FIFA World Cup qualification | Puerto Rico | 2–1 | Saint Vincent and the Grenadines | Mayagüez, Puerto Rico |
| 21:00 UTC−4 | Antonetti 11'; Echevarria 77' | Report | Anderson 47' | Stadium: Mayagüez Athletics Stadium; Referee: Randy Solano (Dominican Republic) |

| October 14 Friendly | Puerto Rico | 0–6 | Argentina | Fort Lauderdale, United States |
| 18:00 AST (UTC−4) | | Report | Mac Allister 13', 36'; Montiel 22'; Echevarria 64' (o.g.); Martínez 78', 83' | Stadium: Chase Stadium (Note: Match was originally set to be played at Soldier Field in Chicago but was relocated due to unrest from Operation Midway Blitz.); Referee: Armando Villarreal (United States) |

=== 2026 ===
| Wins | Losses | Draws |
|---|---|---|
| 5 | 2 | 0 |

Jay Mims was named head coach on March 7, 2026.

| 25 March 2026 2026 FIFA Series | Puerto Rico | 4–0 | Guam | Bayamón, Puerto Rico |
| 20:00 UTC−4 | W. Rivera 52', 61'; R. Rivera 57'; Antonetti 76' (pen.) | Report | | Stadium: Juan Ramón Loubriel Stadium; Referee: José Corporán (Dominican Republic) |

| 28 March 2026 2026 FIFA Series | Puerto Rico | 2–0 | U.S. Virgin Islands | Bayamón, Puerto Rico |
| 20:00 UTC−4 | De León 19' (pen.); Shaffer 44' (o.g.) | Report | | Stadium: Juan Ramón Loubriel Stadium; Referee: Randy Encarnación (Dominican Republic) |

| 5 June Friendly | Puerto Rico | 0–3 | Saudi Arabia | Austin, Texas, United States |
| 19:00 UTC−4 | | Report | Mandash 45+1'; Al-Hamdan 50'; S. Al-Dawsari 88' | Stadium: Q2 Stadium; Referee: Reon Radix (Grenada) |

| 24 September 2026 2026–27 Nations League | Puerto Rico | 0–1 | Guyana | Roseau, Dominica |
| 15:00 | | | De Rosario 78' (pen.) | Stadium: Windsor Park; Attendance: 200; Referee: Reginald Gumbs (Saint Kitts and Nevis) |

| 27 September 2026 2026–27 Nations League | Dominica | 0–2 | Puerto Rico | Roseau, Dominica |
| 20:00 | | Report | Sulia 4'; W. Rivera 37' | Stadium: Windsor Park; Attendance: 2,131; Referee: Norberto Da Silva (Curaçao) |

| 1 October 2026 2026–27 Nations League | Cayman Islands | 0–3 | Puerto Rico | Mayagüez, Puerto Rico |
| 20:00 | | Report | R. Rivera 26'; W. Rivera 45'; Antonetti 90+3' (pen.) | Stadium: Mayagüez Athletics Stadium; Attendance: 1,575; Referee: Benjamín Pineda (Costa Rica) |

| 4 October 2026 2026–27 Nations League | Puerto Rico | 1–0 | Cayman Islands | Mayagüez, Puerto Rico |
| 18:00 | de León 64' | Report | | Stadium: Mayagüez Athletics Stadium; Attendance: 1,755; Referee: Julio Luna (Guatemala) |

| 13 November 2026 2026–27 Nations League | Puerto Rico | v | Dominica | Georgetown, Guyana |
| | | | | Stadium: Synthetic Track and Field Facility |

| 16 November 2026 2026–27 Nations League | Guyana | v | Puerto Rico | Georgetown, Guyana |
| | | | | Stadium: Synthetic Track and Field Facility |
