= British Virgin Islands national football team results =

These are the results for the British Virgin Islands national football team. BVI's score is listed first.

== British Virgin Islands all-time record against all nations ==
Note: Teams in italic indicates that teams are not FIFA members.

Against	Played	Won	Drawn	Lost	GF	GA	GD
Anguilla	9	5	1	3	17	10	+7
Antigua and Barbuda	1	0	0	1	0	2	-2
Aruba	1	0	0	1	0	7	-7
Bahamas	6	2	2	2	9	10	-1
Barbados	1	0	0	1	1	2	-1
Bermuda	3	1	0	2	3	14	-10
Bonaire	4	1	0	3	8	10	-2
Cayman Islands	10	2	3	5	7	15	-8
Dominica	7	0	1	6	5	37	-32
Dominican Republic	4	0	1	3	1	24	-23
French Guiana	1	0	0	1	0	6	-6
Gibraltar	1	0	0	1	0	4	-4
Grenada	2	0	0	2	1	9	-8
Guadeloupe	1	0	1	1	0	3	-3
Guatemala	1	0	0	1	0	3	-3
Haiti	1	0	0	1	0	6	-6
Jamaica	2	0	0	2	0	13	-13
Martinique	4	0	0	1	0	12	-29
Montserrat	5	2	0	3	6	13	-7
Puerto Rico	5	2	1	2	8	10	–2
Saint Kitts and Nevis	8	0	1	7	2	26	-24
Saint Lucia	5	0	0	5	4	24	-20
Saint Martin	3	1	0	2	4	7	-3
Saint Vincent and the Grenadines	4	0	2	2	2	14	-12
Sint Maarten	2	0	0	2	4	6	-2
Suriname	2	0	0	2	4	9	-5
Trinidad and Tobago	2	0	0	2	0	9	-9
Turks and Caicos Islands	4	0	1	3	2	10	-8
U.S. Virgin Islands	8	3	3	2	11	6	+5
Total	105	19	20	48	99	321	-222

== Results ==
Date	Location	Opponent	Score	Scorers for British Virgin Islands	Competition
10 May 1991	St. Kitts and Nevis	Cayman Islands	1–2	?	1991 Caribbean Cup
14 May 1991	St. Kitts and Nevis	Saint Kitts and Nevis	0–0	-	1991 Caribbean Cup
15 April 1992	St. Kitts and Nevis	Saint Kitts and Nevis	0–4	-	1992 Caribbean Cup
17 April 1992	St. Kitts and Nevis	Antigua and Barbuda	0–2	-	1992 Caribbean Cup
29 March 1993	St. Kitts and Nevis	Saint Kitts and Nevis	1–5	Bramble 30'	1993 Caribbean Cup
31 March 1993	St. Kitts and Nevis	Dominican Republic	1–3	Farrell 69'	1993 Caribbean Cup
2 March 1994	Cayman Islands	Cayman Islands	0–5	-	1994 Caribbean Cup
4 March 1994	Cayman Islands	Jamaica	0–12	-	1994 Caribbean Cup
6 March 1994	Cayman Islands	Sint Maarten	2–3	?	1994 Caribbean Cup
2 April 1997	Dominica	Dominica	1–6	Ferron 44'	1997 Caribbean Cup
3 April 1997	Dominica	Anguilla	4–1	?	1997 Caribbean Cup
6 April 1997	Dominica	Sint Maarten	2–3	Ferron, Heyliger	1997 Caribbean Cup
1 April 1998	St. Kitts and Nevis	Saint Kitts and Nevis	0–4	-	1998 Caribbean Cup
3 April 1998	St. Kitts and Nevis	Guadeloupe	0–3	-	1998 Caribbean Cup
5 April 1998	St. Kitts and Nevis	Dominica	1–4	Deshong 75'	1998 Caribbean Cup
5 February 1999	British Virgin Islands	Montserrat	3–1	?	1999 Caribbean Cup
7 February 1999	British Virgin Islands	Montserrat	3–0	?	1999 Caribbean Cup
17 March 1999	Haiti	Dominican Republic	0–0	-	1999 Caribbean Cup
19 March 1999	Haiti	Puerto Rico	5–0	?	1999 Caribbean Cup
21 March 1999	Haiti	Haiti	0–6	-	1999 Caribbean Cup
1 February 2000	British Virgin Islands	Saint Lucia	2–3	Browne 16', Ferron 31'	Friendly
25 February 2000	British Virgin Islands	Anguilla	3–4	?	Friendly
27 February 2000	British Virgin Islands	Anguilla	4–0	?	Friendly
5 March 2000	British Virgin Islands	Bermuda	1–5	A. Williams 61'	2002 WCQ
19 March 2000	Bermuda	Bermuda	0–9	-	2002 WCQ
3 February 2001	Puerto Rico	Puerto Rico	2–1	Simmons 6', Azile 50'	2001 Caribbean Cup
11 February 2001	British Virgin Islands	Puerto Rico	0–0	-	2001 Caribbean Cup
24 March 2001	British Virgin Islands	U.S. Virgin Islands	2–0	?	Friendly
4 April 2001	Martinique	Cayman Islands	2–2	Thomas 13', Av. Williams 48'	2001 Caribbean Cup
6 April 2001	Martinique	Martinique	0–6	-	2001 Caribbean Cup
8 April 2001	Martinique	Saint Vincent and the Grenadines	0–6	-	2001 Caribbean Cup
22 June 2002	Grenada	Grenada	0–5	-	Friendly
6 July 2002	British Virgin Islands	Anguilla	2–1	Baptiste 42', Huggins 44'	Friendly
14 July 2002	British Virgin Islands	Saint Lucia	1–3	Huggins 53'	2003 GCQ
28 July 2002	St. Lucia	Saint Lucia	1–8	Azile 36'	2003 GCQ
28 January 2004	British Virgin Islands	Dominica	0–1	-	Friendly
30 January 2004	British Virgin Islands	U.S. Virgin Islands	5–0	Rabsatt 18' (o.g.), Av. Williams 24', Morris 26', 56', Ferron 88'	Friendly
1 February 2004	British Virgin Islands	Dominica	1–2	Morris 28'	Friendly
22 February 2004	British Virgin Islands	Saint Lucia	0–1	-	2006 WCQ
21 March 2004	St. Kitts and Nevis	Saint Kitts and Nevis	0–4	-	Friendly
28 March 2004	St. Lucia	Saint Lucia	0–9	-	2006 WCQ
25 September 2004	British Virgin Islands	U.S. Virgin Islands	2–1	Heyliger 48', Etienne 55'	Friendly
24 November 2004	St. Vincent and the Grenadines	Saint Vincent and the Grenadines	1–1	Haynes 53'	2005 Caribbean Cup
26 November 2004	St. Vincent and the Grenadines	Cayman Islands	0–1	-	2005 Caribbean Cup
28 November 2004	St. Vincent and the Grenadines	Bermuda	2–0	James 12', 24'	2005 Caribbean Cup
12 December 2004	British Virgin Islands	Trinidad and Tobago	0–4	-	2005 Caribbean Cup
19 December 2004	Trinidad and Tobago	Trinidad and Tobago	0–2	-	2005 Caribbean Cup
11 November 2007	Saint-Martin	Saint Martin	1–0	Av. Williams (?)	Friendly
14 March 2008	British Virgin Islands	U.S. Virgin Islands	0–0	-	Friendly
15 March 2008	British Virgin Islands	U.S. Virgin Islands	1–1	?	Friendly
26 March 2008	Bahamas	Bahamas	1–1	Lennon 68'	2010 WCQ
30 March 2008	Bahamas	Bahamas	2–2	Av. Williams 78', 90' (pen.)	2010 WCQ
24 September 2008	St. Kitts and Nevis	Saint Kitts and Nevis	0–4	-	2008 Caribbean Championship
26 September 2008	St. Kitts and Nevis	Barbados	1–2	Lennon 15'	2008 Caribbean Championship
5 December 2009	Dominica	Dominica	0–4	-	Friendly
18 September 2010	Saint-Martin	Anguilla	2–1	Mitchell 5', 8'	Friendly
19 September 2010	Saint-Martin	Saint Martin	1–3	Johnson 15'	Friendly
14 October 2010	Dominican Republic	Dominican Republic	0–17	-	2010 Caribbean Championship
15 October 2010	Dominican Republic	Dominica	0–10	-	2010 Caribbean Championship
3 July 2011	U.S. Virgin Islands	U.S. Virgin Islands	0–2	-	2014 WCQ
10 July 2011	British Virgin Islands	U.S. Virgin Islands	1–2	Peters 38'	2014 WCQ
7 July 2012	British Virgin Islands	Anguilla	1–0	Septus 75'	Friendly
5 September 2012	Martinique	Martinique	0–16	-	2012 Caribbean Championship
7 September 2012	Martinique	Suriname	0–4	-	2012 Caribbean Championship
9 September 2012	Martinique	Montserrat	0–7	-	2012 Caribbean Championship
30 May 2014	Aruba	French Guiana	0–6	-	2014 Caribbean Championship
1 June 2014	Aruba	Aruba	0–7	-	2014 Caribbean Championship
3 June 2014	Aruba	Turks and Caicos Islands	0–2	-	2014 Caribbean Championship
16 August 2014	British Virgin Islands	Saint Martin	2–4	Robinson (?), Fisher 55'	Friendly
21 September 2014	St. Vincent and the Grenadines	Saint Vincent and the Grenadines	0–6		Friendly
22 March 2015	British Virgin Islands	Dominica	2–3	E. Moss 42', Johnson 52'	2018 WCQ
29 March 2015	Dominica	Dominica	0–0		2018 WCQ
23 March 2016	Martinique	Martinique	0–3		2017 Caribbean Cup qualification
26 March 2016	British Virgin Islands	Dominica	0–7		2017 Caribbean Cup qualification
13 October 2018	Suriname	Suriname	0–5		2019–20 CONCACAF Nations League qualifying
16 October 2018	Martinique	Martinique	0–4		2019–20 CONCACAF Nations League qualifying
21 March 2019	Anguilla	Turks and Caicos Islands	2–2	Caesar 64', Wiltshire 83'	2019–20 CONCACAF Nations League qualifying
24 March 2019	Anguilla	Bonaire	1–2	Wilson 76' (pen.)	2019–20 CONCACAF Nations League qualifying
6 September 2019	Curaçao	Bonaire	2–4	Forbes 32', 90+2'	2019–20 CONCACAF Nations League C
10 October 2019	Saint Kitts and Nevis	Bahamas	0–4		2019–20 CONCACAF Nations League C
13 October 2019	Saint Kitts and Nevis	Bonaire	3–4	Rowe 45+3', Forbes 65', Wiltshire 84'	2019–20 CONCACAF Nations League C
14 November 2019	Saint Kitts and Nevis	Bahamas	0–3		2019–20 CONCACAF Nations League C
27 March 2021	Curaçao	Guatemala	0–3		2022 WCQ
30 March 2021	Curaçao	Saint Vincent and the Grenadines	0–3		2022 WCQ
2 June 2021	Guatemala	Cuba	0–5		2022 WCQ
5 June 2021	Guatemala	Curaçao	0–8		2022 WCQ
27 January 2022	England	Anguilla	1–2	Wilson	Friendly
3 June 2022	British Virgin Islands	Cayman Islands	1–1	Caesar 63'	2022–23 Nations League
6 June 2022	Cayman Islands	Cayman Islands	1–1	Wilson 46'	2022–23 Nations League
12 June 2022	Puerto Rico	Puerto Rico	0–6		2022–23 Nations League
23 March 2023	British Virgin Islands	Puerto Rico	1–3	Forbes 36' (pen.)	2022–23 Nations League

== Sources ==
- RSSSF Archive
- FIFA.com list of fixtures
