= Boumelaha =

Boumelaha is a surname. Notable people with the surname include:

- Olivier Boumelaha (born 1981), French footballer, brother of Sabri and Virgile
- Sabri Boumelaha (born 1989), Algerian footballer
- Virgile Boumelaha (born 1983), French footballer
