= Eduardo Soto =

Eduardo Soto may refer to:

- Eduardo Soto (footballer, born 1965), Chilean football manager and footballer
- Eduardo Soto (footballer, born 1990), Guatemalan footballer
