= Yeltsin (name) =

Yeltsin (Russian: Ельцин) is a Russian masculine surname, its feminine counterpart is Yeltsina. Outside Russia it was also occasionally used as a given name, honouring Boris Yeltsin. Several Slavic languages render the name as Jeljcin. The name may refer to:

== Surname ==
- Boris Yeltsin (1931–2007), President of Russia
- Naina Yeltsina (born 1932), widow of Boris Yeltsin
- Tatyana Dyachenko (née Yeltsina in 1960), daughter and presidential advisor of Boris Yeltsin

== Given name ==
- Yeltsin Álvarez (born 1994), Guatemalan footballer
- Yeltsin Jacques (born 1991), Brazilian Paralympic runner
- Yeltsin Tejeda (born 1992), Costa Rican footballer

== See also ==
- Yelchin
