= Jorge Vargas (footballer, born 1993) =

Guatemalan footballer

Jorge Estuardo Vargas
Personal information
- Full name: Jorge Estuardo Vargas García
- Date of birth: 26 February 1993 (age 33)
- Place of birth: Guatemala City, Guatemala
- Height: 1.70 m (5 ft 7 in)
- Position: Midfielder

Team information
- Current team: Xelajú
- Number: 15

Senior career*
Years	Team	Apps	(Gls)
2012–2015	Comunicaciones	2	(0)
2015	Antigua	5	(1)
2015–2016	Comunicaciones	1	(0)
2017–2018	Guastatoya	60	(14)
2018–2020	Comunicaciones	61	(14)
2020–2023	Guastatoya	142	(27)
2023–	Xelajú	0	(0)

International career^{‡}
- Guatemala U20
2018–	Guatemala	21	(3)
- * Club domestic league appearances and goals as of 1 June 2021 ‡ National team caps and goals as of 4 July 2021

Jorge Estuardo Vargas García (born 26 February 1993) is a Guatemalan professional footballer who plays as a midfielder for Liga Guate club Xelajú and the Guatemalan national team.

== International career ==
In 2013, he was called up to participate in the 2013 Copa Centroamericana in Costa Rica.

On 15 August 2018, he was called up once more and debuted in a friendly match against Cuba in a 3–0 victory.

On 5 September 2019, Vargas scored his first national for Guatemala in a major tournament against Anguilla in a decisive 10–0 victory in the CONCACAF Nations League.

== Career statistics ==
=== International goals ===
Scores and results list Guatemala's goal tally first

No.	Date	Venue	Opponent	Score	Result	Competition
1.	5 September 2019	Estadio Doroteo Guamuch Flores, Guatemala City, Guatemala	Anguilla	1–0	10–0	2019–20 CONCACAF Nations League C
2.	4 June 2021	Estadio Doroteo Guamuch Flores, Guatemala City, Guatemala	Saint Vincent and the Grenadines	9–0	10–0	2022 FIFA World Cup qualification

== Honours ==
Comunicaciones

- Liga Nacional de Guatemala: Clausura 2013, Clausura 2014, Clausura 2015

Guastatoya

- Liga Nacional de Guatemala: Clausura 2018, Apertura 2020
