= Yelchin =

Yelchin (Russian: Ельчин) is a Russian family name. Notable people with the surname include:

- Anton Yelchin (1989–2016), American actor
- Eugene Yelchin (born 1956), Russian-American illustrator and author, and uncle of Anton

== See also ==
- Yeltsin (name)
