= Edi Danilo Guerra =

Guatemalan footballer

Personal information
- Full name: Edi Danilo Guerra Pérez
- Date of birth: 11 December 1987 (age 38)
- Place of birth: Santa Ana, Guatemala
- Height: 1.78 m (5 ft 10 in)
- Position: Forward

Senior career*
Years	Team	Apps	(Gls)
2016–2020	Municipal	74	(25)
2017–2019	Cobán Imperial (loan)	92	(36)
2020	Cobán Imperial	13	(1)
2020–2021	Municipal	0	(0)
2021	→ Iztapa (loan)	14	(1)
2021–2022	Mixco		
2023	San Benito		

International career
2014–2019	Guatemala	15	(9)
- * Club domestic league appearances and goals as of 12 January 2021

Edi Danilo Guerra Pérez (born 11 December 1987) is a Guatemalan former professional footballer who played as a forward.

== International career ==
On 5 September 2019, Guerra scored four goals in Guatemala's 10–0 blowout win over Anguilla in their first game of the CONCACAF Nations League.

== Career statistics ==
Scores and results list Guatemala's goal tally first, score column indicates score after each Guerra goal.

List of international goals scored by Edi Danilo Guerra
No.	Date	Venue	Opponent	Score	Result	Competition
1	15 August 2018	Estadio Doroteo Guamuch Flores, Guatemala City, Guatemala	Cuba	2–0	3–0	Friendly
2	5 September 2019	Estadio Doroteo Guamuch Flores, Guatemala City, Guatemala	Anguilla	5–0	10–0	2019–20 CONCACAF Nations League C
3	5 September 2019	Estadio Doroteo Guamuch Flores, Guatemala City, Guatemala	Anguilla	6–0	10–0	2019–20 CONCACAF Nations League C
4	5 September 2019	Estadio Doroteo Guamuch Flores, Guatemala City, Guatemala	Anguilla	7–0	10–0	2019–20 CONCACAF Nations League C
5	5 September 2019	Estadio Doroteo Guamuch Flores, Guatemala City, Guatemala	Anguilla	9–0	10–0	2019–20 CONCACAF Nations League C
6	10 September 2019	Mayagüez Athletics Stadium, Mayagüez, Puerto Rico	Puerto Rico	2–0	5–0	2019–20 CONCACAF Nations League C
7	12 October 2019	Raymond E. Guishard Technical Centre, The Valley, Anguilla	Anguilla	1–0	5–0	2019–20 CONCACAF Nations League C
8	21 November 2019	Estadio Israel Barrios, Coatepeque, Guatemala	Antigua and Barbuda	2–0	8–0	Friendly
9	21 November 2019	Estadio Israel Barrios, Coatepeque, Guatemala	Antigua and Barbuda	3–0	8–0	Friendly
