= Sabri Boumelaha =

Algerian footballer (born 1989)

Personal information
- Full name: Sabri Cyrille Boumelaha
- Date of birth: 21 September 1989 (age 37)
- Place of birth: Mulhouse, France
- Height: 1.81 m (5 ft 11 in)
- Position: Left-back

Youth career
- Bourgfelden
- St-Louis
- –2007: Old Boys
- 2007–2009: Basel

Senior career*
Years	Team	Apps	(Gls)
2007–2009	Basel U-21	43	(0)
2009–2011	Basel	0	(0)
2009	→ Concordia Basel (loan)	9	(0)
2010	→ Thun (loan)	3	(0)
2010–2011	→ Wil 1900 (loan)	25	(0)
2012	Minyor Pernik	24	(0)
2013–2014	Mulhouse	23	(0)
2014	Black Stars Basel		
2015	SR Delémont	11	(0)
2016–?	Saint-Louis Neuweg	1	(0)
- * Club domestic league appearances and goals as of 3 June 2014

Sabri Cyrille Boumelaha (born 21 September 1989) is a footballer who plays as a left-back. Born in France, he opted to represent Algeria at international level.

== Career ==
Boumelaha was born in Mulhouse, France. He joined FC Basel's U21 team from BSC Old Boys in July 2007 and made 28 appearances in his first season with the club. In the 2008–2009 season, Boumelaha made another 15 appearances for the reserve side before being loaned out to Challenge League side FC Concordia Basel in January for the rest of the season. On 8 March 2009, he made his professional debut for Concordia starting in a 3–1 loss against FC Locarno. He made 8 more appearances for the club before returning to FC Basel at the end of his loan.

== International career ==
Despite being born in France, Boumelaha chose to represent Algeria in international competition. He received his first call-up to the Algerian Under-23 National Team for a training camp in September 2009. The camp was capped off with a friendly against local side CR Belouizdad, a game in which Boumelaha started in. On 14 September 2009, he received his second call up to the team.

== Personal life ==
Boumelaha has two older brothers who are also professional footballers: Virgile Boumelaha and Olivier Boumelaha.
