= Wilber Pérez =

Guatemalan footballer (born 1988)

Personal information
- Full name: Wilber Mauricio Pérez Medrano
- Date of birth: 26 September 1988 (age 38)
- Place of birth: Jalpatagua, Guatemala
- Height: 1.81 m (5 ft 11 in)
- Position: Forward

Senior career*
Years	Team	Apps	(Gls)
2010–2011	Antigua		
2011–2013	Suchitepéquez	77	(15)
2013–2014	Coatepeque	24	(0)
2014–2015	Petapa	41	(17)
2015–2016	Municipal	13	(2)
2016	Cobán Imperial	12	(0)
2016–2017	Guastatoya	21	(2)
2017–2018	Marquense	18	(4)
2018	Sanarate	23	(7)
2018–2019	Gjilani	18	(7)
2019–2020	Malacateco	31	(16)
2020–2022	Xelajú	69	(11)
2022	→ Santa Lucía (loan)	18	(1)
2023	USAC	10	(2)
2023–2024	Achuapa	11	(2)
2024	Sacachispas	0	(0)

International career
2013–2020	Guatemala	13	(1)
- * Club domestic league appearances and goals

Wilber Mauricio Pérez Medrano (born 29 September 1988) is a Guatemalan retired international footballer who played as a striker.

== Club career ==
Born in Jalpatagua, he has played club football for Antigua GFC, Suchitepéquez, Coatepeque, Petapa, Municipal, Cobán Imperial, Guastatoya, Marquense, Sanarate and Gjilani.

== International career ==
He made his international debut for Guatemala in 2013.

== Career statistics ==
=== International goals ===
Scores and results list Guatemala's goal tally first.

No.	Date	Venue	Opponent	Score	Result	Competition
1.	12 October 2019	Raymond E. Guishard Technical Centre, The Valley, Anguilla	Anguilla	4–0	5–0	2019–20 CONCACAF Nations League C
