= Akeem Hill =

Barbadian footballer (born 1996)

Personal information
- Date of birth: 1 November 1996 (age 30)
- Place of birth: Bridgetown, Barbados
- Height: 1.77 m (5 ft 10 in)
- Position: Forward

Team information
- Current team: Barbados Defence Force

International career
Years	Team	Apps	(Gls)
2015–	Barbados	19	(1)

Akeem Hill (born November 1, 1996) is a Barbadian footballer who plays for Barbados Defence Force and the Barbadian national team. He debuted on 3 June 2018, in a 0-0 friendly match against Belize.

On 8 September 2019, Hill scored his first goal for Barbados against Cayman Islands of the 2019–20 CONCACAF Nations League in a 3–2 defeat.

== International ==
Appearances and goals by national team and year
National team	Year	Apps	Goals
Barbados	2015	1	0
Barbados	2017	6	0
Barbados	2018	6	0
Barbados	2019	8	1
Barbados	2020	2	0
Barbados	2021	2	0
Total		25	1

== International goals ==
Scores and results list Barbados' goal tally first.

No.	Date	Venue	Opponent	Score	Result	Competition
1.	8 September 2019	Truman Bodden Sports Complex, George Town, Cayman Islands	Cayman Islands	1–1	2–3	2019–20 CONCACAF Nations League C
