= Marvin Ceballos =

Guatemalan footballer (born 1992)

Personal information
- Full name: Marvin José Ceballos Flores
- Date of birth: 22 April 1992 (age 34)
- Place of birth: Guatemala City, Guatemala
- Height: 1.71 m (5 ft 7 1/2 in)
- Position: Midfielder

Team information
- Current team: Marquense

Senior career*
Years	Team	Apps	(Gls)
2011–2015	Comunicaciones	69	(8)
2015	Indy Eleven	12	(2)
2016	Carolina RailHawks	15	(0)
2017	Antigua	13	(1)
2017–2018	Comunicaciones	56	(8)
2019	Guastatoya	20	(4)
2019–2020	UdeG	15	(1)
2020–2021	Guastatoya	35	(5)
2021–2022	UdeG	17	(0)
2022–2025	Xinabajul	74	(11)
2025–	Marquense	20	(2)

International career
2009	Guatemala U17	3	(1)
2011	Guatemala U20	4	(1)
2010–2022	Guatemala	28	(6)
- * Club domestic league appearances and goals as of 12:33, 24 May 2025 (UTC)

Marvin José Ceballos Flores (born 22 April 1992) is a Guatemalan professional footballer who plays as a midfielder for Liga Guate club Marquense.

== Club career ==
=== Comunicaciones ===
Ceballos made his professional debut with Comunicaciones of the Liga Nacional de Fútbol de Guatemala on 21 August 2011 against Xelajú. He started the match and earned a yellow card as Comunicaciones lost 1–0. He made his international club debut three days later in the CONCACAF Champions League against Costa Rican side, Herediano. He started that match and scored the first goal for his side as they went on to win 2–0. Ceballos then scored his first league goal of his career on 7 December 2011 against Xelajú as Comunicaciones won 3–0.

Ceballos ended the 2013–14 season with nine yellow cards but lowered that down to two for the 2014–15 season.

=== Indy Eleven ===
On 4 August 2015, it was announced that Ceballos had signed with Indy Eleven of the North American Soccer League in the United States.

=== Carolina RailHawks ===
After one season in Indianapolis, Ceballos signed with fellow NASL side Carolina RailHawks.

=== Return to Comunicaciones ===
On 7 June 2017, Comunicaciones announced the official return of Ceballos to the club.

=== Leones Negros UdeG ===
On 2 July 2019, Ceballos signed with Leones Negros UdeG of the Ascenso MX in Mexico.

=== Marquense ===
On 24 May 2025, it was confirmed that Ceballos would be leaving Xinabajul and joining Marquense.

== International career ==
=== Youth career ===
Ceballos was a part of the Guatemala U20 side that played in the 2011 FIFA U-20 World Cup. It was his 81st-minute goal against Croatia U20 that lead his side to a 1–0 victory and a ticket to the Round of 16.

=== Senior career ===
Ceballos made his international debut for Guatemala on 4 September 2010 against Nicaragua. He came on as a 53rd-minute substitute for Henry Medina as Guatemala won 5–0.

== Honours ==
Comunicaciones

- Liga Nacional: Clausura 2011, Clausura 2014, Clausura 2015

Guastatoya

- Liga Nacional: Apertura 2020

== Career statistics ==
Club	Season	League		Domestic Cup		International		Total	
Club	Season	Apps	Goals	Apps	Goals	Apps	Goals	Apps	Goals
Comunicaciones	2011–12	20	1	—	—	3	1	23	2
Comunicaciones	2013–14	20	4	—	—	—	—	20	4
Comunicaciones	2014–15	29	3	—	—	4	—	33	3
Comunicaciones	Total	69	8	—	—	7	1	76	9
Indy Eleven	2015	12	2	—	—	—	—	12	2
Indy Eleven	Total	12	2	—	—	—	—	12	2
Career total		81	10	—	—	7	1	88	11

=== International goals ===
Scores and results list Guatemala's goal tally first.

No.	Date	Venue	Opponent	Score	Result	Competition
1.	15 August 2018	Estadio Doroteo Guamuch Flores, Guatemala City, Guatemala	Cuba	3–0	3–0	Friendly
2.	5 September 2019	Estadio Doroteo Guamuch Flores, Guatemala City, Guatemala	Anguilla	3–0	10–0	2019–20 CONCACAF Nations League C
3.	5 September 2019	Estadio Doroteo Guamuch Flores, Guatemala City, Guatemala	Anguilla	8–0	10–0	2019–20 CONCACAF Nations League C
4.	10 September 2019	Mayagüez Athletics Stadium, Mayagüez, Puerto Rico	Puerto Rico	1–0	5–0	2019–20 CONCACAF Nations League C
5.	12 October 2019	Raymond E. Guishard Technical Centre, The Valley, Anguilla	Anguilla	3–0	5–0	2019–20 CONCACAF Nations League C
6.	4 June 2021	Estadio Doroteo Guamuch Flores, Guatemala City, Guatemala	Saint Vincent and the Grenadines	8–0	10–0	2022 FIFA World Cup qualification
