= Wilson Pineda =

Guatemalan footballer (born 1993)

Personal information
- Full name: Wilson Augusto Pineda Cornelio
- Date of birth: 25 September 1993 (age 33)
- Place of birth: Sanarate, Guatemala
- Height: 1.78 m (5 ft 10 in)
- Position: Right-back

Team information
- Current team: Comunicaciones
- Number: 22

Youth career
- 2009–2014: Guastatoya

Senior career*
Years	Team	Apps	(Gls)
2014–2016	Guastatoya	68	(3)
2016–2018	Comunicaciones	33	(2)
2018–2024	Guastatoya	265	(8)
2024–	Comunicaciones	21	(2)

International career
2018–2021	Guatemala	14	(2)
- * Club domestic league appearances and goals as of 20:00, 22 March 2025 (UTC)

Wilson Augusto Pineda Cornelio (born on 25 September 1993) is a Guatemalan professional footballer who plays as a right-back for Liga Guate club Comunicaciones.

== Early life ==
Pineda was born in Sanarate in the department of El Progreso on 25 September 1993.

== International career ==
Pineda debuted internationally in a friendly match on 18 August 2018, where he scored his first goal for Guatemala in a 1–0 victory over Cuba.

On 12 October 2019, Pineda scored his first goal in a major competition against Anguilla during the match of the CONCACAF Nations League in a 0–5 victory.

== Career statistics ==
=== International goals ===
Scores and results list Guatemala's goal tally first.

No.	Date	Venue	Opponent	Score	Result	Competition
1.	12 October 2019	Raymond E. Guishard Technical Centre, The Valley, Anguilla	Anguilla	5–0	5–0	2019–20 CONCACAF Nations League C

== Honours ==
Guastatoya

- Liga Nacional de Guatemala: 2018 Clausura, 2018 Apertura, 2020 Apertura
