= Vidian Valérius =

Guadeloupean footballer (born 1988)

Personal information
- Date of birth: 24 June 1988 (age 38)
- Place of birth: Saint-Claude, Guadeloupe
- Height: 1.73 m (5 ft 8 in)
- Position: Forward

Youth career
- 2005–2006: Paris FC
- 2006–2008: Sedan

Senior career*
Years	Team	Apps	(Gls)
2008–2009	Sénart-Moissy		
2009–2010	Jura Sud		
2010–2011	Saint-Malo		
2011–2012	FC Rouen	7	(0)
2012–2013	US Concarneau	28	(3)
2013–2014	Stade Bordelais	25	(11)
2014–2016	FC Fleury 91	44	(8)
2016–2017	AS Vitré	15	(4)
2018	Lusitanos	7	(0)
2018–2019	Saint-Louis Neuweg	6	(2)
2019–2020	La Gauloise		
2020	Phare Petit-Canal		

International career
2008–2019	Guadeloupe	12	(1)
- * Club domestic league appearances and goals

Vidian Valérius (born 24 June 1988) is a Guadeloupe football player who plays as forward.

== International career ==
=== International goals ===
Scores and results Guadeloupe's goal tally first.

No.	Date	Venue	Opponent	Score	Result	Competition
1.	19 November 2019	Stade René Serge Nabajoth, Les Abymes, Guadeloupe	Turks and Caicos Islands	3–0	10–0	2019–20 CONCACAF Nations League C

== Early life ==
At an early age, Vidian started had a partiality for basketball but began to play football before or around the age of 13.

== Career ==
He started his career in France with Paris FC.

Soon after the National Cup of regions in Clairefontaine, Paris FC recruited him, but he only spent one season there.

He was the third top scorer in the Championnat de France Amateur Group D in 2014 with 11 goals.

In 2014, Valérius signed for FC Fleury 91.

In 2013, he signed for Stade Bordelais.

Late in 2016, he signed for AS Vitré.

In 2018, he signed for FC Saint-Louis Neuweg.

In 2020, he signed for Phare Petit-Canal.

He is a Guadeloupe international.
