= Yannick Chevalier =

Martinois footballer (born 1987)

Personal information
- Full name: Yannick Chevalier
- Date of birth: 27 May 1987 (age 39)
- Place of birth: Saint-Denis, France
- Height: 1.78 m (5 ft 10 in)
- Position: Forward

Team information
- Current team: Saint Jean le Blanc

Senior career*
Years	Team	Apps	(Gls)
2004–2005	Beauvais Oise B		
2005–2006	Angers	3	(0)
2006–2008	Valenciennes B	31	(8)
2008–2009	Orléans	10	(1)
2009–2010	Orléans B	22	(13)
2010–2011	Thonon Évian B	12	(7)
2012	Thouars Foot 79		
2012–2014	Olympique Saumur	42	(5)
2014–2015	Saint-Pryvé Saint-Hilaire	10	(0)
2017–2018	Orléans B	23	(11)
2018–2019	Montargis	11	(1)
2019–2021	Châteauneuf-sur-Loire	32	(17)
2021–	Saint Jean le Blanc		

International career^{‡}
2019–	Saint Martin	2	(2)
- * Club domestic league appearances and goals as of 18 May 2021 ‡ National team caps and goals as of 18 May 2021

Yannick Chevalier (born 27 May 1987) is a footballer who plays as a forward for US Châteauneuf-sur-Loire. Born in metropolitan France, he represents the Saint Martin national team.

== Career statistics ==
=== International goals ===
Scores and results list Saint Martin's goal tally first.

No.	Date	Venue	Cap	Opponent	Score	Result	Competition
1.	16 November 2019	Raymond E. Guishard Technical Centre, The Valley, Anguilla	1	Barbados	1–0	1–0	2019–20 CONCACAF Nations League C
2.	19 November 2019	Bethlehem Soccer Stadium, Upper Bethlehem, U.S. Virgin Islands	2	U.S. Virgin Islands	1–0	2–1	2019–20 CONCACAF Nations League C
