= Darren Ríos =

Puerto Rican footballer (born 1995)

Personal information
- Full name: Darren Scott Ríos
- Date of birth: October 14, 1995 (age 31)
- Place of birth: Fort Lauderdale, Florida, U.S.
- Height: 1.78 m (5 ft 10 in)
- Position: Midfielder

Team information
- Current team: Naples United FC

Youth career
- 2003–2011: West Pine United
- 2011–2013: Weston FC

College career
Years	Team	Apps	(Gls)
2013–2017	FIU Panthers	59	(5)

Senior career*
Years	Team	Apps	(Gls)
2017	K-W United	12	(0)
2018	Miami City	11	(1)
2018–2019	Huracán Moncada	9	(1)
2020	Satélite Norte		
2021–	Miami City	2	(0)

International career^{‡}
2016–	Puerto Rico	38	(7)
- * Club domestic league appearances and goals as of June 12, 2021 ‡ National team caps and goals as of October 14, 2025

Darren Scott Ríos (born October 14, 1995) is a professional footballer who plays as a midfielder for National Independent Soccer Association club Michigan Stars. Born in the United States, he plays for the Puerto Rico national team.

== Early life ==
Ríos started at local side West Pine United and the U.S. Soccer Developmental Academy in Weston while also studying at Archbishop Edward A. McCarthy High School, which he joined in 2009. He spent time on trial at Colombian side Bogotá F.C. in 2011, and was named in the 2012 Broward-County team.

== College career ==
Having graduated from McCarthy High in 2013 with honors in anatomy and physiology, Ríos left the Weston-based development camp and enrolled at the Florida International University, where he joined the university's soccer team, The Panthers.

== International career ==
Ríos made his international debut for Puerto Rico in their first ever international game against the United States in 2016.

== Career statistics ==
=== Club ===
As of 25 January 2021.

Appearances and goals by club, season and competition
Club	Season	League			National cup		Other		Total	
Club	Season	Division	Apps	Goals	Apps	Goals	Apps	Goals	Apps	Goals
K-W United	2017	Premier Development League	12	0	0	0	0	0	12	0
Miami City	2018	Premier Development League	11	1	0	0	0	0	11	1
Huracán Moncada	2018–19	Preferential Valenciana	9	1	0	0	0	0	9	1
Career total			32	2	0	0	0	0	32	2

=== International ===
As of match played 14 October 2025

Appearances and goals by national team and year
National team	Year	Apps	Goals
Puerto Rico	2016	1	0
Puerto Rico	2019	4	0
Puerto Rico	2021	6	0
Puerto Rico	2022	2	1
Puerto Rico	2023	9	2
Puerto Rico	2024	10	3
Puerto Rico	2025	6	1
Total		38	7
