= Luis Martínez (footballer, born 1991) =

Guatemalan footballer

Personal information
- Full name: Luis Fernando Martínez Castellanos
- Date of birth: 14 December 1991 (age 34)
- Place of birth: Salamá, Guatemala
- Height: 1.72 m (5 ft 7 1/2 in)
- Position: Forward

Team information
- Current team: Malacateco
- Number: 7

Senior career*
Years	Team	Apps	(Gls)
2012–2017	Xelajú	125	(30)
2017–2022	Guastatoya	130	(26)
2022	Municipal	19	(1)
2023–2024	Cobán Imperial	51	(12)
2024–2025	Zacapa	14	(1)
2025–	Malacateco	0	(0)

International career
2015–2022	Guatemala	26	(7)
- * Club domestic league appearances and goals as of 20:58, 20 December 2024 (UTC)

Luis Fernando Martínez Castellanos (born 14 December 1991), also known as El Salamá, is a Guatemalan professional footballer who plays as a forward for Liga Nacional club Malacateco.

== International career ==
Martínez was first called up to the Guatemala squad in 2015. He scored his first goal for Guatemala in a 3–1 victory over Honduras.

== Career statistics ==
=== International ===
As of match played 6 July 2021.

National team	Year	Apps	Goals
Guatemala	2015	1	0
Guatemala	2016	6	1
Guatemala	2017	0	0
Guatemala	2018	1	0
Guatemala	2019	7	2
Guatemala	2020	2	0
Guatemala	2021	6	4
Total		23	7

==== International goals ====
Scores and results list Guatemala's goal tally first.

No.	Date	Venue	Opponent	Score	Result	Competition
1.	10 February 2016	Estadio Doroteo Guamuch Flores, Guatemala City, Guatemala	Honduras	3–1	3–1	Friendly
2.	26 March 2019	Nicaragua National Football Stadium, Managua, Nicaragua	Nicaragua	1–0	1–0	Friendly
3.	16 November 2019	Estadio Doroteo Guamuch Flores, Guatemala City, Guatemala	Puerto Rico	5–0	5–0	2019–20 CONCACAF Nations League C
4.	24 March 2021	Estadio Doroteo Guamuch Flores, Guatemala City, Guatemala	Cuba	1–0	1–0	2022 FIFA World Cup qualification
5.	4 June 2021	Estadio Doroteo Guamuch Flores, Guatemala City, Guatemala	Saint Vincent and the Grenadines	6–0	10–0	2022 FIFA World Cup qualification
6.	3 July 2021	DRV PNK Stadium, Fort Lauderdale, United States	Guyana	2–0	4–0	2021 CONCACAF Gold Cup qualification
7.	6 July 2021	DRV PNK Stadium, Fort Lauderdale, United States	Guadeloupe	1–1	1–1	2021 CONCACAF Gold Cup qualification

== Honours ==
Xelajú

- Liga Nacional de Guatemala: Clausura 2012

Guastatoya

- Liga Nacional de Guatemala: Clausura 2018, Apertura 2018, Apertura 2020
