= Terry Delancy =

Bahamian association football player

Personal information
- Full name: Terry Decarlo Delancy Jr.
- Date of birth: 28 February 1994 (age 32)
- Place of birth: Nassau, Bahamas
- Height: 1.80 m (5 ft 11 in)
- Position: Left midfielder

Team information
- Current team: Cavalier FC

College career
Years	Team	Apps	(Gls)
2012–2015	South Florida Bulls	71	(1)

Senior career*
Years	Team	Apps	(Gls)
2016	Tampa Bay Rowdies 2	4	(0)
2017–	Cavalier FC		

International career^{‡}
2015–	Bahamas	11	(4)
- * Club domestic league appearances and goals as of 31 December 2019 ‡ National team caps and goals as of 13 July 2020

Terrence Decarlo Delancy Jr. (born 28 February 1994) is a Bahamian footballer who plays for Cavalier FC and the Bahamas national football team.

== Career ==
=== College ===
Delancy attended college at the University of South Florida, playing all four years he attended the school. He scored his lone goal in 71 appearances in his sophomore season during a 4–1 victory over Southern Methodist University.

=== International ===
Delancy made his senior international debut on 25 March 2015 in a 5–0 away defeat to Bermuda in World Cup qualifying, coming on as a 75th-minute substitute for Kristoff Wood. Nearly four years later, he scored his first international as part of a hat-trick in a 6-1 friendly victory over the Turks and Caicos Islands, netting in the 1st, 8th, and 61st minutes.

== Career statistics ==
As of match played 17 November 2019.

National team	Year	Apps	Goals
Bahamas	2015	2	0
Bahamas	2016	0	0
Bahamas	2017	0	0
Bahamas	2018	3	0
Bahamas	2019	6	4
Total		11	4

=== International goals ===
Scores and results list the Bahamas' goal tally first.

No.	Date	Venue	Opponent	Score	Result	Competition
1.	16 March 2019	Thomas Robinson Stadium, Nassau, Bahamas	Turks and Caicos Islands	1–0	6–1	Friendly
2.	16 March 2019	Thomas Robinson Stadium, Nassau, Bahamas	Turks and Caicos Islands	2–0	6–1	Friendly
3.	16 March 2019	Thomas Robinson Stadium, Nassau, Bahamas	Turks and Caicos Islands	4–0	6–1	Friendly
4.	17 November 2019	Ergilio Hato Stadium, Willemstad, Curaçao	Bonaire	1–0	1–1	2019–20 CONCACAF Nations League C

== Personal life ==
Delancy is related to Olympic swimmer Nikia Deveaux. In 2008, at the age of 14, Delancy won the Bahamian section of the Red Bull Street Style football freestyle event. With his victory, he qualified for the World Final in São Paulo.
