= Virgile Boumelaha =

French footballer (born 1983)

Personal information
- Full name: Virgile Jamel Boumelaha
- Date of birth: 6 August 1983 (age 43)
- Place of birth: Mulhouse, France
- Height: 1.83 m (6 ft 0 in)
- Position: Midfielder

Team information
- Current team: FC Langenthal

Youth career
- 1996–1998: FC Saint-Louis
- 1998–2000: FC Basel
- 2000–2002: Sochaux

Senior career*
Years	Team	Apps	(Gls)
2002–2004	Sochaux	2	(0)
2004–2005	VfB Stuttgart II	11	(0)
2005–2006	HJK Helsinki	1	(0)
2006–2008	SR Delémont	19	(0)
2008	FC Gossau	4	(0)
2009–	FC Grenchen		
2012–	FC Langenthal		
- * Club domestic league appearances and goals as of 13:59, 23 December 2008 (UTC)

Virgile Boumelaha (born 6 August 1983) is a French former footballer.

== Career ==
Boumelaha began his career with FC Saint-Louis, he moved then to FC Basel and later to FC Sochaux-Montbéliard in 2002 but made two appearances for the club before joining VfB Stuttgart in 2004. He failed to break into the first team there, also, signed for HJK Helsinki where he played 1 game over the course of the 2005/06 season. He then moved to Switzerland with SR Delémont in January 2006 where he played 19 games. After just two seasons with Delémont, he made his way to FC Gossau of the Challenge League, who he played 6 months between 18 December 2008 who left the team, he signed than in February 2009 with FC Grenchen.

== Privates ==
He is the younger brother of Olivier Boumelaha and the elder brother of Sabri Boumelaha.
