= Luis de León (footballer) =

Guatemalan footballer (born 1995)

Personal information
- Full name: Luis Enrique de León Valenzuela
- Date of birth: 14 November 1995 (age 30)
- Place of birth: Guatemala City, Guatemala
- Position: Right-back

Team information
- Current team: Cobán Imperial
- Number: 14

Senior career*
Years	Team	Apps	(Gls)
2015–2016	USAC	25	(2)
2016–2018	Guastatoya	78	(3)
2018–2022	Municipal	110	(1)
2022-	Cobán Imperial	108	(4)

International career^{‡}
2015	Guatemala U20		
2019–	Guatemala	7	(1)
- * Club domestic league appearances and goals ‡ National team caps and goals as of 05:00, 19 April 2025 (UTC)

Luis Enrique „Kiri” de León Valenzuela (born 14 November 1995) is a Guatemalan professional footballer who plays as a defender for Liga Guate club Cobán Imperial and the Guatemala national team.

== International career ==
He debuted internationally in the Guatemala U-20 team in Group Stage of the 2015 CONCACAF U-20 Championship in Jamaica.

In 10 September 2019, de Léon made his senior debut and scored his first goal for Guatemala against Puerto Rico in a 5–0 victory in the CONCACAF Nations League.

== Career statistics ==
=== International goals ===
Scores and results list Guatemala's goal tally first.

No.	Date	Venue	Opponent	Score	Result	Competition
1.	10 September 2019	Mayagüez Athletics Stadium, Mayagüez, Puerto Rico	Puerto Rico	5–0	5–0	2019–20 CONCACAF Nations League C

== Honours ==
Guastatoya

- Liga Nacional de Guatemala: Clausura 2018

Municipal

- Liga Nacional de Guatemala: Apertura 2019

Cobán Imperial

- Liga Nacional de Guatemala: Apertura 2022
