= Eduardo Soto (footballer, born 1990) =

Guatemalan footballer (born 1990)

Personal information
- Full name: Eduardo Beltrán Soto Barrios
- Date of birth: 3 March 1990 (age 36)
- Place of birth: San Gaspar Chajul, Quiche, Guatemala
- Height: 1.73 m (5 ft 8 in)
- Position: Right-back

Team information
- Current team: Cobán Imperial
- Number: 30

Eduardo Beltrán Soto Barrios (born 3 March 1990) is a Guatemalan professional footballer who plays as a right-back for Liga Nacional club Cobán Imperial.

== International career ==
He made his debut for the full Guatemalan team against Cuba on the 19 August 2018.
