= 2014–15 Liga Nacional de Guatemala =

62nd professional season of the top-flight football league in Guatemala

Liga Nacional de Guatemala
- Season: 2014–15
- Dates: 19 July 2014 – 23 May 2015
- Champions: Apertura: Comunicaciones (29th title); Clausura: Comunicaciones (30th title)
- Relegated: Halcones; Coatepeque
- Champions League: Comunicaciones; TBD
- Matches: 120
- Goals: 300 (2.5 per match)
- Top goalscorer: Carlos Ruíz (12)
- Biggest home win: Municipal 6 Coatepeque 0 (September 21, 2014)
- Biggest away win: Xelajú 1 Comunicaciones 3 (August 24, 2014); Suchitepéquez 1 Deportivo Petapa 3 (August 31, 2014)
- Longest winning run: Municipal (4)
- Longest unbeaten run: Municipal (7)
- Longest winless run: Antigua GFC (10)
- Longest losing run: Coatepeque (3)

The 2014–15 Liga Nacional de Guatemala was the 62nd professional season of the top-flight football league in Guatemala. The season was divided into two championships—the 2014 Apertura and the 2015 Clausura—each in an identical format and each contested by the same 12 teams.

== Format ==
The format for both championships are identical. Each championship will have two stages: a first stage and a playoff stage. The first stage of each championship is a double round-robin format. The teams that finish first and second in the standings will advance to the playoffs semifinals, while the teams that finish 3–6 will enter in the quarterfinals. The winner of each quarterfinal will advance to the semifinals. The winners of the semifinals will advance to the finals, which will determine the tournament champion.

== Teams ==
Locations of the 2014–15 Liga Nacional de Fútbol de Guatemala teams

Team	Home city	Stadium	Capacity
Antigua	Antigua Guatemala, Sacatepequez	Pensativo	9,000
Coatepeque	Coatepeque, Quetzaltenango	Israel Barrios	20,000
Comunicaciones	Guatemala, Guatemala	Cementos Progreso	16,000
Guastatoya	Guastatoya, El Progreso	David Cordón Hichos	3,000
Halcones	La Mesilla, Huehuetenango	Comunal	5,340
Malacateco	Malacatán, San Marcos	Santa Lucía	7,000
Marquense	San Marcos, Guatemala	Marquesa de la Ensenada	10,000
Municipal	Guatemala, Guatemala	Manuel Felipe Carrera	7,500
Petapa	San Miguel Petapa, Guatemala	Julio Armando Cobar	7,000
Suchitepéquez	Mazatenango, Suchitepéquez	Carlos Salazar Hijo	12,000
USAC	Guatemala, Guatemala	Revolución	5,000
Xelajú	Quetzaltenango	Mario Camposeco	11,000

== Apertura ==
The 2014 Torneo Apertura began on July 19, 2014 and ended on December 20, 2014.

=== Standings ===
Pos	Team	Pld	W	D	L	GF	GA	GD	Pts	Qualification
1	Comunicaciones	22	13	4	5	34	15	+19	43	Qualified to the Semifinals
2	Marquense	22	13	3	6	30	19	+11	42	Qualified to the Semifinals
3	Municipal	22	11	6	5	37	19	+18	39	Qualified to the Quarterfinals
4	Suchitepéquez	22	9	4	9	28	28	0	31	Qualified to the Quarterfinals
5	Petapa	22	9	3	10	35	32	+3	30	Qualified to the Quarterfinals
6	Antigua	22	7	9	6	24	21	+3	30	Qualified to the Quarterfinals
7	Xelajú	22	8	6	8	29	29	0	30	
8	USAC	22	7	5	10	25	28	−3	26	
9	Malacateco	22	5	11	6	21	24	−3	26	
10	Guastatoya	22	7	4	11	20	31	−11	25	
11	Halcones	22	6	5	11	24	42	−18	23	
12	Coatepeque	22	3	8	11	15	34	−19	17	

Updated to match(es) played on November 19, 2014. Source: Guatefutbol- Estadisticas Liga Nacional
Rules for classification: 1) points; 2) goal difference; 3) number of goals scored.

=== Results ===
Home \ Away	ANT	COA	COM	GUA	HAL	MAL	MAR	MUN	PET	SUC	USC	XEL
Antigua		1–1	0–2	2–0	4–2	2–0	0–1	1–1	1–0	2–0	2–2	0–0
Coatepeque	0–2		0–1	3–1	1–1	1–1	0–1	0–1	2–0	0–0	0–0	2–3
Comunicaciones	3–0	2–0		2–0	1–0	1–0	5–0	1–1	3–3	0–1	3–0	1–0
Guastatoya	1–1	1–1	1–0		2–0	0–0	0–1	2–1	1–0	3–0	3–2	1–0
Halcones	1–1	3–1	2–2	1–0		0–0	1–1	1–0	3–1	3–2	1–0	1–2
Malacateco	0–0	0–0	0–1	3–1	2–0		1–0	2–1	2–0	1–1	1–1	1–1
Marquense	1–0	3–0	1–1	2–0	4–0	4–0		4–0	4–1	2–1	2–0	2–1
Municipal	0–0	6–0	0–2	2–1	5–1	1–1	1–0		4–1	3–1	1–0	4–1
Petapa	1–2	1–0	2–0	4–0	6–1	3–3	3–1	2–1		1–0	1–0	1–1
Suchitepéquez	2–1	4–0	1–0	1–1	1–0	3–1	2–1	1–2	1–3		2–1	4–1
USAC	2–1	1–1	2–0	2–1	2–0	3–2	2–0	0–1	3–1	0–0		1–3
Xelajú MC	1–1	1–2	1–3	3–0	4–2	0–0	0–1	0–0	2–1	2–0	2–1	

Updated to match(es) played on November 9, 2014. Source: Guatefutbol – Central de partidos: Campeonato Apertura 2014
Legend: Blue = home team win; Yellow = draw; Red = away team win.

=== Playoffs ===
Quarterfinals
5	Petapa	0	2	2
4	Suchitepéquez	3	1	4
5
4
3	Municipal	1	1	2
6	Antigua	0	1	1
7
2

Semifinals
1	Comunicaciones	1	1	2
4	Suchitepéquez	0	1	1
2	Marquense	0	1	1
3	Municipal	3	2	5

Finals
1	Comunicaciones	1	2	3
3	Municipal	1	1	2

==== Quarterfinals ====
===== First leg =====
4 December 2014

Antigua	1– 1	Municipal
Roberto Carlos Pena 35'		Claudio Albizuris 43'

Estadio Pensativo, Antigua
Attendance: 5,223
Referee: Mario Escobar

5 December 2014

Petapa	2–1	Suchitepéquez
Adrian Apellaniz 89'; Marbel Aragon 90'		Emiliano Ariel Lopez 35'

Estadio Julio Armando Cóbar, San Miguel, Petapa
Attendance: 1,388
Referee: Rueben Castellanos

===== Second leg =====
7 December 2014

Municipal	1–0	Antigua
Kevin Santamaria 45'		None

Estadio El Trébol, Guatemala City
Attendance: 2,587
Referee: Oscar Reyna

8 December 2014

Suchitepéquez	3–0	Petapa
Carlos Barrios 54'; Hugo Prieto 66'; German Esquivel 85'		None

Estadio Municipal Carlos Salazar Hijo, Mazatenango
Attendance: 5,256
Referee: Jonathon Polanco

==== Semifinals ====
===== First leg =====
12 December 2014

Suchitepéquez	1–1	Comunicaciones
Luis Mora 46'		Joel Francisco Benitez 75'

Estadio Municipal Carlos Salazar Hijo, Mazatenang

12 December 2014

Municipal	3–0	Marquense
Maximiliano Callorda 40'; 71'; Kevin Santamaria 43'

Estadio El Trébol, Guatemala City

===== Second leg =====
14 December 2014

Comunicaciones	1–0	Suchitepéquez
Rolando Blackburn 38'

Estadio Cementos Progreso, Guatemala City

15 December 2014

Marquense	1–2	Municipal
Kevin Norales 59'		Hamilton López 6'; Osman López 39'

Estadio Marquesa de la Ensenada, San Marcos

==== Finals ====
===== First leg =====
18 December 2014
20:00 GMT-6

Municipal	1–1	Comunicaciones
Maximiliano Callorda 64'		Joel Francisco Benitez 69'

Estadio Nacional Mateo Flores,
Guatemala City
Attendance: 12,175
Referee: Mario Escobar

===== Second leg =====
20 December 2014
16:00 GMT-6

Comunicaciones	2–1	Municipal
Agustín Herrera 4', 25'		Cristian Jiménez 71'

Estadio Nacional Mateo Flores,
Guatemala City
Attendance: 10,000

=== Top Goalscorers ===
As of November 19th, 2014

Rank	Player	Club	Home	Away	Goals
1	(Guatemala) Carlos Ruíz	Municipal	8	4	12
2	(Argentina) Fernando Gallo	Halcones FC	9	2	11
3	(Argentina) Emiliano Ariel López	Suchitepéquez	8	2	10
3	(Guatemala) Wilber Pérez	Petapa	7	3	10
4	(Uruguay) Adrián Apellaniz	Petapa	5	4	9
5	(Panama) Rolando Blackburn	Comunicaciones	7	1	8

== List of foreign players in the league ==
This is a list of foreign players in Clausura 2014. The following players:

1. have played at least one apertura game for the respective club.
2. have not been capped for the Guatemala national football team on any level, independently from the birthplace

A new rule was introduced a few season ago, that clubs can only have five foreign players per club and can only add a new player if there is an injury or player/s is released.

Antigua GFC

- (Brazil) Israel Silva
- (Brazil) Tomas de Souza
- (Colombia) Roberto Carlos Pena
- (Uruguay) Mario Pineiro

Deportivo Coatepeque

- (Panama) Jose Calderon
- (Uruguay) Miguel Lavie

CSD Comunicaciones

- (El Salvador) Paolo Suarez

Guastatoya

- (Colombia) Diner Cordova
- (Mexico) Jose de Santiago
- (Paraguay) Victor Solalinde
- (Paraguay) Lelis Roman

Halcones FC

- TBD

Deportivo Malacateco

- TBD

(player released during the season)

Deportivo Marquense

- None

C.S.D. Municipal

- (El Salvador) Kevin Santamaria
- (Uruguay) Santiago Morandi
- (Uruguay) Maximiliano Callorda
- (Uruguay) Diego de Souza

Deportivo Petapa

- (Argentina) Juan Lovato
- (Uruguay) Adrian Apellaniz

C.D. Suchitepéquez

- (Belize) Shane Mooney Orio

Universidad de San Carlos (Guatemalan football club)

- (Argentina) Fernando Gallo
- (Honduras) Sergio Mendoza
- (Uruguay) Guillermo Reyes

Club Xelajú MC

- TBD

== Clausura ==
The 2015 Torneo Clausura began on 18 January 2015 and ended on 23 May 2015.

=== Personnel and sponsoring ===
Team	Chairman	Head coach	Kitmaker	Shirt sponsor
Antigua	(Guatemala) Rafael Arreaga	(Argentina) Mauricio Tapia	TBD	Pegamex
Coatepeque	(Guatemala) Eduardo Avila	(Guatemala) Manuel Castañeda	Puma	TBD
Comunicaciones	(Mexico) Pedro Portilla	(Uruguay) William Coito Olivera	Puma	TBD
Guastatoya	(Guatemala)	(Uruguay) Ariel Sena	TBD	TBD
Halcones	(Guatemala) TBD	(Costa Rica) Ronald Gomez	TBD	TBD
Malacateco	(Guatemala) TBD	(Honduras) Emilio Umanzor	TBD	TBD
Marquense	(Guatemala) TBD	(Uruguay) Carlos Washington Blanco	TBD	TBD
Municipal	(Guatemala) TBD	(Argentina) Enzo Trossero	TBD	TBD
Petapa	(Guatemala) TBD	(Argentina) Pablo Centrone	TBD	TBD
Suchitepéquez	(Guatemala) TBD	(Guatemala) Walter Claverí	TBD	TBD
USAC	(Guatemala) TBD	(Guatemala) Francisco Melgar Samayoa	TBD	TBD
Xelajú	(Guatemala) TBD	(Honduras) Nahúm Espinoza	RetoSports	TBD

=== During the season ===
Team	Outgoing manager	Manner of departure	Date of vacancy	Replaced by	Date of appointment	Position in table
Deportivo Coatepeque	(Guatemala) Manuel Castañeda	Sacked	Feb 2015	(Argentina) Héctor Julián Trujillo	Feb 2015	12th (Clausura 2015)
Universidad SC	(Guatemala) Francisco Melgar Samayoa	Sacked	2015	(Argentina) Roberto Gamarra	2015	9th (Clausura 2015)
Deportivo Coatepeque	(Argentina) Héctor Julián Trujillo	resigned	2015	(Chile) Sergio Pardo	2015	12th (Clausura 2015)
Deportivo Coatepeque	(Chile) Sergio Pardo	Sacked	April 2015	(Guatemala) Otto Muñoz	April 2015	12h (Clausura 2015)

=== Standings ===
Pos	Team	Pld	W	D	L	GF	GA	GD	Pts	Qualification
1	Comunicaciones	22	15	3	4	50	14	+36	48	Qualified to the Semifinals
2	Municipal	22	12	6	4	31	16	+15	42	Qualified to the Semifinals
3	Suchitepéquez	22	11	5	6	33	30	+3	38	Qualified to the Quarterfinals
4	Antigua GFC	22	10	5	7	25	19	+6	35	Qualified to the Quarterfinals
5	Xelajú	22	8	7	7	28	24	+4	31	Qualified to the Quarterfinals
6	Malacateco	22	8	5	9	29	37	−8	29	Qualified to the Quarterfinals
7	Deportivo Petapa	22	7	7	8	24	31	−7	28	
8	Marquense	22	6	9	7	22	29	−7	27	
9	Universidad SC	22	6	8	8	19	24	−5	26	
10	Guastatoya	22	6	4	12	19	25	−6	22	
11	Halcones	22	5	5	12	24	34	−10	20	
12	Coatepeque	22	5	2	15	12	33	−21	17	

Updated to match(es) played on 15 March 2015. Source:
Rules for classification: 1) points; 2) goal difference; 3) number of goals scored.

=== Results ===
Home \ Away	ANT	COA	COM	GUA	HAL	MAL	MAR	MUN	PET	SUC	USC	XEL
Antigua GFC		1–0	1–0	1–0	4–0	2–2	0–1	0–0	1–1	2–0	2–0	1–1
Coatepeque	0–1		0–2	0–2	2–1	2–1	1–1	0–1	2–1	0–1	0–1	1–0
Comunicaciones	0–1	4–0		1–0	3–0	1–1	2–1	0–2	1–0	7–1	5–0	2–0
Guastatoya	0–1	1–0	3–3		3–1	1–0	3–0	1–1	2–0	0–2	0–2	2–2
Halcones FC	2–1	2–0	0–1	1–0		5–2	2–2	0–1	0–0	1–1	0–0	5–0
Malacateco	2–3	4–1	0–3	1–0	2–1		1–0	1–0	1–1	3–0	2–0	3–2
Marquense	0–0	2–1	0–2	1–0	1–1	3–1		1–4	3–0	1–1	0–0	2–3
Municipal	4–2	3–0	1–1	2–1	1–0	0–0	0–1		4–1	1–0	2–0	1–0
Petapa	1–0	1–1	0–5	1–0	2–1	0–0	1–1	3–1		4–0	1–0	2–1
Suchitepéquez	2–1	1–0	1–5	4–0	2–1	4–0	5–0	2–0	2–1		1–1	1–0
Universidad SC	2–0	0–1	1–2	1–0	3–0	4–2	1–1	1–1	2–2	0–0		0–2
Xelajú MC	1–0	2–0	1–0	0–0	3–0	4–0	0–0	1–1	3–1	2–2	0–0	

Updated to match(es) played on 2015. Source:
Legend: Blue = home team win; Yellow = draw; Red = away team win.

=== Playoffs ===
==== Quarterfinals ====
===== First leg =====
7 May 2015

Deportivo Malacateco	0– 0	C.D. Suchitepéquez
None		None

Estadio Municipal Santa Lucía, Malacatán
Attendance: 1,077
Referee: J. Polanco

8 May 2015

Club Xelajú MC	1–0	Antigua GFC
Luis Javier Guarino 86'		None

Estadio Mario Camposeco, Quetzaltenango
Attendance: 4,455
Referee: O. Aldana

===== Second leg =====
10 May 2015

C.D. Suchitepéquez	1–0	Deportivo Malacateco
Emiliano Ariel Lopez 13'		None

Estadio Municipal Carlos Salazar Hijo, Mazatenango

Suchitepéquez won 1–0 on aggregate.

11 May 2015

Antigua GFC	3–0	Club Xelajú MC
Oscar Isula 41'; Alejandro Galindo 47'; Oscar Isula 54'		None

Estadio Pensativo, Antigua

Antigua won 3–1 on aggregate.

==== Semifinals ====
===== First leg =====
14 May 2015

Antigua GFC	1–5	C.S.D. Comunicaciones
Alejandro Galindo 30'		Jairo Arreola 9' 77'; Carlos Castrillo 11'; Agustin Herrera 23'; Ruben Morales 43'

Estadio Pensativo, Antigua

15 May 2015

C.D. Suchitepéquez	0–0	C.S.D. Municipal
None		None

Estadio Municipal Carlos Salazar Hijo, Mazatenango

===== Second leg =====
17 May 2015

C.S.D. Comunicaciones	1–1	Antigua GFC
Carlos Fernandez 24'		b 29'

TBD

Comunicaciones won 6–2 on aggregate.

18 May 2015

C.S.D. Municipal	3–1	C.D. Suchitepéquez
Carlos Ruiz 40'; Cristian Noriega 50'; Mauro Portillo 88'	[]	Emerson Cabrera 26'

Estadio Nacional Mateo Flores

Municipal won 3–1 on aggregate.

==== Finals ====
===== First leg =====
20 May 2015
22:00 CST

Municipal	0–2	C.S.D. Comunicaciones
	Report	Jose M. Contreras 40'; Agustin E. Herrera 43'

Estadio Mateo Flores,
Guatemala City
Attendance: 12,500
Referee: M. Escobar (Guatemala)

===== Second leg =====
23 May 2015
20:00 CST

Comunicaciones	2–3	Municipal
Jose M. Contreras 77'; Agustin E. Herrera 82'	Report	Maximiliano Callorda 15'; Carlos Ruiz 21', 89'

Estadio Mateo Flores,
Guatemala City
Attendance: 20,000
Referee: W. Lopez (Guatemala)

Comunicaciones won 4–3 on aggregate.

== Top goalscorers ==
Rank	Player	Team	Goals
1	(Argentina) Emiliano Ariel López	C.D. Suchitepéquez	12
2	(Panama) Rolando Blackburn	CSD Comunicaciones	11
3	(Guatemala) José Manuel Contreras	CSD Comunicaciones	9
4	(Guatemala) Carlos Ruiz	C.S.D. Municipal	7
5	(Uruguay) Luis Javier María Guarino	Club Xelajú MC	6
6	(Uruguay) Adrian Apellaniz	Deportivo Petapa	5
7	(Guatemala) Jonny Brown	Deportivo Marquense	5
8	(Mexico) Agustín Herrera	CSD Comunicaciones	5
9	(Guatemala) Oscar Isaula	Antigua GFC	5
10	(Guatemala) Wilber Perez	Deportivo Petapa	5

== List of foreign players in the league ==
This is a list of foreign players in Clausura 2014. The following players:

1. have played at least one apertura game for the respective club.
2. have not been capped for the Guatemala national football team on any level, independently from the birthplace

A new rule was introduced a few season ago, that clubs can only have five foreign players per club and can only add a new player if there is an injury or player/s is released.

Antigua

- (Brazil) Anderson Pasos Baptista
- (Costa Rica) Olman Vargas
- (Colombia) Roberto Carlos Pena
- (Costa Rica) Minor Álvarez

Coatepeque

- (Panama) Jose Calderon
- (Panama) Armando Polo
- (Brazil) Augusto César Gómez
- (Costa Rica) Roberto Porras

Comunicaciones

- (El Salvador) Paolo Suarez
- (Paraguay) Joel Benítez
- (Panama) Rolando Blackburn
- (Mexico) Agustín Herrera

Guastatoya

- (Paraguay) Victor Solalinde
- (Colombia) Diner Cordoba
- (Paraguay) Gabriel Garcete
- (Argentina) Fernando Gallo

Halcones

- (Brazil) Evandro Ferreira de Moura
- (Brazil) Ismael Soares
- (Honduras) Romel Murillo
- (Argentina) Fernando Gallo

Malacateco

- (Colombia) Ricardo Mina Romero
- (Mexico) Leonardo García
- (Mexico) Ricardo Rocha
- (Honduras) Orvin Paz
- (Honduras) Randy Diamond

(player released during the season)

Marquense

- None

Municipal

- (El Salvador) Kevin Santamaria
- (El Salvador) Jaime Alas
- (Uruguay) Maximiliano Callorda
- (Uruguay) Diego de Souza

Petapa

- (Argentina) Juan Lovato
- (Uruguay) Adrian Apellaniz
- (Brazil) Lucas Marçal

Suchitepéquez

- (Belize) Shane Orio
- (Uruguay) Jesús Benítez
- (Colombia) Jefferson Angulo

USAC

- (Argentina) Fernando Gallo
- (Honduras) Sergio Mendoza
- (Uruguay) Guillermo Reyes

Xelajú

- (Brazil) Juliano Rangel de Andrade
- (Uruguay) Javier Guarino
- (United States) Aslinn Rodas
