= Bailey Rowe =

British Virgin Islands footballer

Personal information
- Full name: Bailey George Rowe
- Date of birth: 5 March 2002 (age 24)
- Place of birth: Weymouth, England
- Position: Forward

Team information
- Current team: Portland United
- Number: 69

Youth career
- –2020: Weymouth

Senior career*
Years	Team	Apps	(Gls)
2020–2022	Poole Town	8	(2)
2021–2022	Hamworthy United		
2023–	Portland United		

International career^{‡}
2018–	British Virgin Islands	5	(2)
- * Club domestic league appearances and goals as of 14:14, 16 August 2018 (UTC) ‡ National team caps and goals as of 22:26, 16 February 2020 (UTC)

Bailey George Rowe (born 5 March 2002) is a British Virgin Islands footballer who currently plays for Portland United and the British Virgin Islands national team. He is the youngest goalscorer in the history of the BVI senior national side.

== Club career ==
Rowe began his career in the youth set-up at Weymouth of the Southern League Premier South. Rowe scored two goals in the final of the Under-15 Dorset Youth County Cup as Weymouth defeated Merley Cobham Sports 5–1. That season, the team completed the treble by also winning the League Cup and County Cup. Rowe scored against Dorchester Magpies in the 5–3 victory in League Cup final. For the 2018 season, the club finished 4th in the Division One of the Dorset Youth Football League.

Rowe later signed for Poole Town.

In January 2022 he joined Hamworthy United as part of an effort to regain match fitness as a long-term injury.

== International career ==
In 2017 Rowe was part of the British Virgin Islands' under-15 squad which participated in the 2017 CONCACAF Under-15 Championship. Rowe led the front line throughout the tournament. He scored a hat-trick against Turks and Caicos and, in the final match of the group stage alone, scored four times in the first half of an 8–2 victory over Montserrat. The side topped its group in the tournament before losing to French Guiana in the knockout round.

Rowe was called up the senior squad for the first time at the age of 15 in April 2018 for a training camp at the Milton Abbey School in Milton Abbas, England. He played for the team against his club team, Weymouth, in a friendly match at Bob Lucas Stadium on 14 April. Rowe came on as a first-half substitute, changing the flow of the match and nearly scoring several times. After the match Weymouth manager Mark Molesley remarked about Rowe, "He is a young lad with a bright future, he looked good, he moved well."

He was called up to the senior squad again in July 2018 at the age of 16. About the call-up BVI Assistant Manager Dan Neville said, "...He is always likely to get you a goal and I think his call-up has been justified." As part of the camp, he made his senior international debut on 25 July 2018 in a friendly against Sint Maarten. After coming on as a second-half substitute, Rowe scored his first senior international goal, the game-winner of the 3–2 victory. With the goal Rowe secured the BVI's first away victory since 2011 and became the youngest goalscorer in the history of the senior national team. Two days later, he participated with the senior national team in a two-day, four-team unofficial tournament held in Saint Barthélemy. He appeared in the British Virgin Islands matches against Saint Martin and the hosts. The British Virgin Islands Football Association called the string of results the, "best result in over a decade."

=== International goals ===
Score and result list British Virgin Islands' goal tally first.

No.	Date	Venue	Opponent	Score	Result	Competition
1.	25 July 2018	Raoul Illidge Sports Complex, Philipsburg, Sint Maarten	Sint Maarten	3–2	3–2	Friendly
2.	13 October 2019	Warner Park, Basseterre, Saint Kitts and Nevis	Bonaire	1–1	3–4	2019–20 CONCACAF Nations League C

=== International statistics ===
As of match played 13 October 2019

British Virgin Islands
Year	Apps	Goals
2018	3	1
2019	2	1
Total	5	2
