= CF Huracán Moncada =

Spanish football club

Huracán Moncada
- Full name: Club de Fútbol Huracán Moncada
- Nickname(s): Rojiblanca (Red Whites); Los Huracanes (Hurricanes)
- Founded: 2016
- Dissolved: 2022
- Ground: Municipal; Moncada, Valencia, Spain
- Capacity: 1,000
- 2021–22: Regional Preferente – Group 1, 5th of 16
- Website: http://www.cfhuracan.com/
Home colours	Away colours	Third colours

Club de Fútbol Huracán Moncada was a Spanish football team based in Moncada, in the Valencian Community. Founded in 2016 and dissolved in 2022, it played in Regional Preferente – Group 2, holding its home games in ‘’Nou Camp de Morvedre” in Sagunt

== History ==
Huracán Moncada was founded in June 2016, after an agreement from Huracán Valencia CF's board with FBM Moncada CF. In 2018, the club became the reserve team of Atlético Saguntino.

In July 2022, Huracán was expelled from the competitions by the Valencian Community Football Federation, and subsequently folded.

== Season to season ==
- As an independent team

Season	Tier	Division	Place	Copa del Rey
2016–17	5	Reg. Pref.	12th	
2017–18	5	Reg. Pref.	13th	

- As the reserve team of Atlético Saguntino

Season	Tier	Division	Place
2018–19	5	Reg. Pref.	14th
2019–20	5	Reg. Pref.	13th
2020–21	5	Reg. Pref.	5th
2021–22	6	Reg. Pref.	5th
