= 2019–20 CONCACAF Nations League C =

Tournament details
- Dates: 5 September – 19 November 2019
- Teams: 13
- Promoted: Bahamas; Barbados; Guadeloupe; Guatemala

Tournament statistics
- Matches played: 30
- Goals scored: 123 (4.1 per match)
- Top scorer(s): (Guadeloupe) Raphael Mirval (7 goals)

The 2019–20 CONCACAF Nations League C was the third and lowest division of the 2019–20 edition of the CONCACAF Nations League, the inaugural season of the international football competition involving the men's national teams of the 41 member associations of CONCACAF.

== Format ==
League C consisted of thirteen teams: the teams from qualifying which finished from 23rd to 34th, along with Guatemala, who were suspended at the deadline to enter qualifying. The league was split into four groups, with three groups of three teams and one group of four teams. The teams competed in a home-and-away, round-robin format over the course of the group phase, with matches played in the official FIFA match windows in September, October and November 2019. The four group winners were promoted to League B for the next edition of the tournament.

In September 2019, it was announced that the Nations League would also provide qualification for the 2021 CONCACAF Gold Cup. The winners of each of the four League C groups entered the first round of Gold Cup qualification.

=== Seeding ===
Teams were seeded into the pots of League C according to their position in the November 2018 CONCACAF Ranking Index.

Pot 1
Team	Pts	Rank
Guatemala	1,419	8
Guadeloupe	1,054	17
Bonaire	766	27
Barbados	707	29

Pot 2
Team	Pts	Rank
Puerto Rico	665	30
Bahamas	582	33
Cayman Islands	532	34
Turks and Caicos Islands	453	36

Pot 3
Team	Pts	Rank
U.S. Virgin Islands	392	37
Saint Martin	338	38
Sint Maarten	328	39
British Virgin Islands	257	40
Anguilla	250	41

The draw for the group phase took place at The Chelsea in Las Vegas, Nevada, United States on 27 March 2019, 22:00 EDT (19:00 local time, PDT).

== Groups ==
The fixture list was confirmed by CONCACAF on 21 May 2019.

Times are EDT/EST, (Note: EDT (UTC−4) for matches in September and October 2019, and EST (UTC−5) for matches in November 2019.) as listed by CONCACAF (local times, if different, are in parentheses).

=== Group A ===
Pos	Team	Pld	W	D	L	GF	GA	GD	Pts	Promotion or qualification	(Barbados)	(Cayman Islands)	(Collectivity of Saint Martin)	(United States Virgin Islands)
1	Barbados (P)	6	4	0	2	14	4	+10	12	League B and Gold Cup prelims	—	3–0	4–0	1–0
2	Cayman Islands	6	4	0	2	7	8	−1	12		3–2	—	1–0	1–0
3	Saint Martin	6	3	0	3	7	8	−1	9		1–0	3–0	—	1–2
4	U.S. Virgin Islands	6	1	0	5	3	11	−8	3		0–4	0–2	1–2	—

Source: CONCACAF
Rules for classification: Tiebreakers
(P) Promoted
5 September 2019
15:00

U.S. Virgin Islands	0–2	Cayman Islands
	Report	Martin 60', 90+5'

Bethlehem Soccer Stadium, Upper Bethlehem
Referee: Tristley Bassue (Saint Kitts and Nevis)
5 September 2019
18:00

Barbados	4–0	Saint Martin
Leacock 4'; Blackman 15', 49'; Gale 64'	Report

Wildey Turf, Bridgetown
Referee: Patrick Senecharles (Haiti)

8 September 2019
15:00

Saint Martin	1–2	U.S. Virgin Islands
Dalmat 78'	Report	Dennis 3'; Joseph 6'

Raymond E. Guishard Technical Centre, The Valley (Anguilla) (Note: Saint Martin played their home matches in Anguilla.)
Referee: Okeito Nicholson (Jamaica)
8 September 2019
19:30 (18:30 UTC−5)

Cayman Islands	3–2	Barbados
Martin 5'; Ebanks 70'; Bellafonte 75'	Report	Hill 14'; Jules 74'

Truman Bodden Sports Complex, George Town
Referee: Luis Enrique Santander (Mexico)

12 October 2019
15:00

Saint Martin	3–0	Cayman Islands
Bellechasse 64', 71', 75'	Report

Raymond E. Guishard Technical Centre, The Valley (Anguilla)
Referee: Oshane Nation (Jamaica)
12 October 2019
20:00

Barbados	1–0	U.S. Virgin Islands
Blackman 55'	Report

Wildey Turf, Bridgetown
Referee: Benjamín Pineda (Costa Rica)

15 October 2019
17:00

U.S. Virgin Islands	0–4	Barbados
	Report	Leacock 17'; Jules 77'; Lashley 80'; Phillips 90'

Bethlehem Soccer Stadium, Upper Bethlehem
Referee: Randy Encarnación (Dominican Republic)
15 October 2019
19:30 (18:30 UTC−5)

Cayman Islands	1–0	Saint Martin
Ebanks 75'	Report

Truman Bodden Sports Complex, George Town
Referee: Fernando Hernández (Mexico)

16 November 2019
15:00 (16:00 UTC−4)

Saint Martin	1–0	Barbados
Chevalier 81'	Report

Raymond E. Guishard Technical Centre, The Valley (Anguilla)
Referee: Bryan López (Guatemala)
16 November 2019
19:30

Cayman Islands	1–0	U.S. Virgin Islands
Hyde 17'	Report

Truman Bodden Sports Complex, George Town
Referee: José Kellys (Panama)

19 November 2019
19:00 (20:00 UTC−4)

Barbados	3–0	Cayman Islands
Hope 32', 90'; Lashley 86'	Report

Wildey Turf, Bridgetown
Referee: Kimbell Ward (Saint Kitts and Nevis)
19 November 2019
19:00 (20:00 UTC−4)

U.S. Virgin Islands	1–2	Saint Martin
McGuiness 69'	Report	Chevalier 39'; Bellechasse 49'

Bethlehem Soccer Stadium, Upper Bethlehem
Referee: Moeth Gaymes (Saint Vincent and the Grenadines)

=== Group B ===
Pos	Team	Pld	W	D	L	GF	GA	GD	Pts	Promotion or qualification	(The Bahamas)	(Bonaire)	(British Virgin Islands)
1	Bahamas (P)	4	3	1	0	10	2	+8	10	League B and Gold Cup prelims	—	2–1	3–0
2	Bonaire	4	2	1	1	10	8	+2	7		1–1	—	4–2
3	British Virgin Islands	4	0	0	4	5	15	−10	0		0–4	3–4	—

Source: CONCACAF
Rules for classification: Tiebreakers
(P) Promoted
6 September 2019
15:00

Bonaire	4–2	British Virgin Islands
Martha 74', 83'; Seinpaal 78'; Trinidad 81'	Report	Forbes 32', 90+2'

Ergilio Hato Stadium, Willemstad (Curaçao) (Note: Bonaire played their home matches in Curaçao.)
Referee: Moeth Gaymes (Saint Vincent and the Grenadines)

9 September 2019
18:00

Bahamas	2–1	Bonaire
Hall 49'; Hepple 78'	Report	Seinpaal 90+2'

Thomas Robinson Stadium, Nassau
Referee: Ricangel de Leça (Aruba)

10 October 2019
19:00

British Virgin Islands	0–4	Bahamas
	Report	St. Fleur 37' (pen.), 49'; Hall 55'; Carey 81'

Warner Park, Basseterre (Saint Kitts and Nevis) (Note: British Virgin Islands played their home matches in Saint Kitts and Nevis.)
Referee: Trevester Richards (Saint Kitts and Nevis)

13 October 2019
15:00

British Virgin Islands	3–4	Bonaire
Rowe 45+3'; Forbes 65'; Wiltshire 84'	Report	Cicilia 25' (pen.); R. Janga 88'; Medway 90+3' (o.g.); Koffy 90+5'

Warner Park, Basseterre (Saint Kitts and Nevis)
Referee: Moeth Gaymes (Saint Vincent and the Grenadines)

14 November 2019
19:00

Bahamas	3–0	British Virgin Islands
Joseph 9'; St. Fleur 11'; Carey 36'	Report

Thomas Robinson Stadium, Nassau
Referee: Tristley Bassue (Saint Kitts and Nevis)

17 November 2019
15:00 (16:00 UTC−4)

Bonaire	1–1	Bahamas
Piar 44'	Report	Delancy 36'

Ergilio Hato Stadium, Willemstad (Curaçao)
Referee: Walter López (Guatemala)

=== Group C ===
Pos	Team	Pld	W	D	L	GF	GA	GD	Pts	Promotion or qualification	(Guatemala)	(Puerto Rico)	(Anguilla)
1	Guatemala (P)	4	4	0	0	25	0	+25	12	League B and Gold Cup prelims	—	5–0	10–0
2	Puerto Rico	4	2	0	2	6	12	−6	6		0–5	—	3–0
3	Anguilla	4	0	0	4	2	21	−19	0		0–5	2–3	—

Source: CONCACAF
Rules for classification: Tiebreakers
(P) Promoted
5 September 2019
22:00 (20:00 UTC−6)

Guatemala	10–0	Anguilla
Vargas 13'; J. Martínez 18'; Ceballos 37', 82'; Galindo 44'; Guerra 60', 72', 77', 86'; Márquez 90+1' (pen.)	Report

Estadio Doroteo Guamuch Flores, Guatemala City
Attendance: 12,496
Referee: Randy Encarnacion (Dominican Republic)

10 September 2019
21:00

Puerto Rico	0–5	Guatemala
	Report	Ceballos 30' (pen.); Guerra 54' (pen.); Galindo 61' (pen.); Robles 66'; De León 89'

Mayagüez Athletics Stadium, Mayagüez
Attendance: 2,000
Referee: Ismael Cornejo (El Salvador)

12 October 2019
20:00

Anguilla	0–5	Guatemala
	Report	Guerra 4'; Santeliz 18'; Ceballos 61' (pen.); Pérez 72'; Pineda 90+2'

Raymond E. Guishard Technical Centre, The Valley
Attendance: 200
Referee: Reon Radix (Grenada)

15 October 2019
20:00

Anguilla	2–3	Puerto Rico
Lake-Bryan 76'; Morgan 89'	Report	Ferrer 39'; Padron 44'; Díaz 54'

Raymond E. Guishard Technical Centre, The Valley
Attendance: 20
Referee: Ricangel de Leça (Aruba)

16 November 2019
20:00 (19:00 UTC−6)

Guatemala	5–0	Puerto Rico
Gallardo 3'; Galindo 19' (pen.), 45'; Álvarez 56'; L. Martínez 82'	Report

Estadio Doroteo Guamuch Flores, Guatemala City
Attendance: 10,000
Referee: Nelson Salgado (Honduras)

19 November 2019
17:00 (18:00 UTC−4)

Puerto Rico	3–0	Anguilla
Rivera 56', 67' (pen.); Vega 82'	Report

Juan Ramón Loubriel Stadium, Bayamón
Attendance: 900
Referee: Ariel Sánchez (Panama)

=== Group D ===
Pos	Team	Pld	W	D	L	GF	GA	GD	Pts	Promotion or qualification	(Guadeloupe)	(Turks and Caicos Islands)	(Sint Maarten)
1	Guadeloupe (P)	4	4	0	0	20	2	+18	12	League B and Gold Cup prelims	—	10–0	5–1
2	Turks and Caicos Islands	4	2	0	2	8	17	−9	6		0–3	—	3–2
3	Sint Maarten	4	0	0	4	6	15	−9	0		1–2	2–5	—

Source: CONCACAF
Rules for classification: Tiebreakers
(P) Promoted
7 September 2019
17:00

Guadeloupe	5–1	Sint Maarten
Ramothe 5'; David 26', 61'; Baron 48'; Hauterville 89'	Report	Lake 83'

Stade René Serge Nabajoth, Les Abymes
Referee: Pierre-Luc Lauzière (Canada)

10 September 2019
15:00

Turks and Caicos Islands	0–3	Guadeloupe
	Report	Mirval 13' (pen.), 51' (pen.); Labylle 84'

TCIFA National Academy, Providenciales
Referee: José Torres (Puerto Rico)

10 October 2019
19:00

Sint Maarten	2–5	Turks and Caicos Islands
Lake 9', 36' (pen.)	Report	Forbes 18', 45+1', 87' (pen.); Beljour 59'; Magny 61'

Ergilio Hato Stadium, Willemstad (Curaçao) (Note: Sint Maarten played their home matches in Curaçao.)
Referee: Ismael Cornejo (El Salvador)

14 October 2019
18:00

Sint Maarten	1–2	Guadeloupe
Lake 75' (pen.)	Report	Mirval 10' (pen.), 35'

Ergilio Hato Stadium, Willemstad (Curaçao)
Referee: José Kellys (Panama)

14 November 2019
15:00

Turks and Caicos Islands	3–2	Sint Maarten
Elcius 37'; Singh 75'; Forbes 90+3'	Report	Lake 12'; Boelijn 45+1'

TCIFA National Academy, Providenciales
Referee: William Anderson (Puerto Rico)

17 November 2019
18:00 (19:00 UTC−4)

Guadeloupe	10–0	Turks and Caicos Islands
Mirval 3', 6', 53'; Valérius 7'; Ramothe 30', 75'; Durbant 39', 63'; Tille 80'; Anatol 90' (pen.)	Report

Stade René Serge Nabajoth, Les Abymes
Referee: Nima Saghafi (United States)

== Goalscorers ==
There were 123 goals scored in 30 matches, for an average of 4.1 goals per match.

7 goals

- (Guadeloupe) Raphael Mirval

6 goals

- (Guatemala) Edi Danilo Guerra

5 goals

- (Sint Maarten) Gerwin Lake

4 goals

- (Guatemala) Marvin Ceballos
- (Guatemala) Alejandro Galindo
- (Collectivity of Saint Martin) Yannick Bellechasse
- (Turks and Caicos Islands) Billy Forbes

3 goals

- (The Bahamas) Lesly St. Fleur
- (Barbados) Nick Blackman
- (British Virgin Islands) Tyler Forbes
- (Cayman Islands) Michael Martin
- (Guadeloupe) Dimitri Ramothe

2 goals

- (The Bahamas) Quinton Carey
- (The Bahamas) Happy Hall
- (Barbados) Rashad Jules
- (Barbados) Hallam Hope
- (Barbados) Armando Lashley
- (Barbados) Omani Leacock
- (Bonaire) Edshel Martha
- (Bonaire) Yurick Seinpaal
- (Cayman Islands) Jonah Ebanks
- (Guadeloupe) Florian David
- (Guadeloupe) Geoffray Durbant
- (Puerto Rico) Sidney Rivera
- (Collectivity of Saint Martin) Yannick Chevalier

1 goal

- (Anguilla) Kyle Lake-Bryan
- (Anguilla) Calvin Morgan
- (The Bahamas) Terry Delancy
- (The Bahamas) Cameron Hepple
- (The Bahamas) Marcel Joseph
- (Barbados) Thierry Gale
- (Barbados) Akeem Hill
- (Barbados) Zico Phillips
- (Bonaire) Ayrton Cicilia
- (Bonaire) Rilove Janga
- (Bonaire) Jurven Koffy
- (Bonaire) Jursten Trinidad
- (Bonaire) Ilfred Piar
- (British Virgin Islands) Bailey Rowe
- (British Virgin Islands) Jerry Wiltshire
- (Cayman Islands) Jorel Bellafonte
- (Cayman Islands) Ackeem Hyde
- (Guadeloupe) Elbert Anatol
- (Guadeloupe) Anthony Baron
- (Guadeloupe) Ryan Hauterville
- (Guadeloupe) Likendy Labylle
- (Guadeloupe) Vikash Tille
- (Guadeloupe) Vidian Valérius
- (Guatemala) Yeltsin Álvarez
- (Guatemala) Carlos Gallardo
- (Guatemala) Luis de León
- (Guatemala) Jean Márquez
- (Guatemala) José Carlos Martínez
- (Guatemala) Luis Martínez
- (Guatemala) Wilber Pérez
- (Guatemala) Wilson Pineda
- (Guatemala) Stheven Robles
- (Guatemala) Edward Santeliz
- (Guatemala) Jorge Estuardo Vargas
- (Puerto Rico) Gerald Díaz
- (Puerto Rico) José Ferrer
- (Puerto Rico) Giovanni Padron
- (Puerto Rico) Devin Vega
- (Collectivity of Saint Martin) Wilfried Dalmat
- (Sint Maarten) Remsley Boelijn
- (Turks and Caicos Islands) Jeff Beljour
- (Turks and Caicos Islands) Jose Elcius
- (Turks and Caicos Islands) Herby Magny
- (Turks and Caicos Islands) Lenford Singh
- (United States Virgin Islands) Aaron Dennis
- (United States Virgin Islands) Raejae Joseph
- (United States Virgin Islands) Ramesses McGuiness

1 own goal

- (British Virgin Islands) Charles Medway (against Bonaire)
