= Olivier Boumelaha =

French footballer (born 1981)

Personal information
- Full name: Olivier Hakim Boumelaha
- Date of birth: 27 May 1981 (age 45)
- Place of birth: Mulhouse, France
- Height: 1.80 m (5 ft 11 in)
- Position: Striker

Senior career*
Years	Team	Apps	(Gls)
1998–2000	FC Basel	1	(0)
2000–2001	FC St. Gallen	2	(0)
2001–2002	Etoile Carouge FC	1	(0)
2002–2003	FC St. Gallen	8	(1)
2003–2004	FC La Chaux-de-Fonds	14	(4)
2004–2005	Al-Ittihad	15	(7)
2005–2006	IFK Mariehamn	5	(2)
2006–2007	PP-70	9	(7)
2007–2008	Al Ahli	10	(5)
2008	FC Gossau	9	(4)
2011	TOT FC		
- * Club domestic league appearances and goals as of 13:58, 23 December 2008 (UTC)

Olivier Hakim Boumelaha (born 27 May 1981) is a French former footballer who played as a striker. He last played for FC Gossau in the Swiss Challenge League. He is the older brother of Virgile Boumelaha and Sabri Boumelaha.

== Career ==
Boumelaha began his career with FC Basel in 1998 but made only one appearance for the club before moving on to FC St. Gallen in 2000. He failed to break into the first team there, also, and after a short spell at Etoile Carouge FC, he signed for FC La Chaux-de-Fonds where he played 14 games over the course of the 2004–05 season. He then moved to the United Arab Emirates with Al-Ittihad in July 2004 where he scored seven goals in just 15 appearances. This caught the eye of many European clubs and IFK Mariehamn of the Finnish Veikkausliiga acquired his services the next season. He scored twice in five matches there, but never broke into the starting XI and dropped down to the Ykkönen (Finland's second division) with Tampereen Peli-Pojat -70 in 2006. He scored goals despite a relatively low number of appearances at PP-70 but returned to the Middle East during the Summer of 2007, this time with Al Ahli of Bahrain. After just one season with The Eagles, he made his way back to Switzerland with FC Gossau of the Challenge League, he left on 18 December 2008 Gossau and will go to Dubai.
