= Jerry Wiltshire =

British Virgin Islands footballer

Personal information
- Full name: Jerry Junior Wiltshire
- Date of birth: 4 February 1996 (age 30)
- Place of birth: Brent, London, England
- Position: Defender

Team information
- Current team: Hampton & Richmond Borough

Youth career
- Queens Park Rangers

College career
Years	Team	Apps	(Gls)
2015	Bethel Wildcats	18	(2)
2018–2019	West Florida Argonauts	35	(5)

Senior career*
Years	Team	Apps	(Gls)
2016	Memphis City		
2017	Chattanooga		
2018	Peachtree City MOBA	13	(0)
2019	Des Moines Menace	6	(0)
2020–2021	Maidenhead United	15	(1)
2021–2022	Walton Casuals	27	(1)
2022–2024	Hayes & Yeading United	41	(4)
2024–	Hampton & Richmond Borough	12	(0)

International career^{‡}
2019–	British Virgin Islands	16	(2)
- * Club domestic league appearances and goals as of 15:52, 27 July 2022 (UTC) ‡ National team caps and goals as of 8 June 2024

Jerry Junior Wiltshire (born 4 February 1996) is a footballer who plays as a defender for Hampton & Richmond Borough. Born in England, he represents the British Virgin Islands national team.

== Club career ==
Wiltshire attended Whitmore High School and West Herts College before joining Bethel University in Tennessee, where he scored twice in 18 games. He played club soccer for Memphis City and Chattanooga before returning to college soccer at the University of West Florida in 2018. He also played for Peachtree City MOBA and Des Moines Menace before returning to England to sign for Maidenhead United after a successful trial in September 2020. He left the Magpies at the end of the season after one goal in 15 appearances. Wiltshire joined Walton Casuals in November 2021. In July 2022, Wiltshire joined Hayes & Yeading United.

== International career ==
Wiltshire scored on his international debut for the British Virgin Islands in a 2–2 draw with the Turks and Caicos Islands.

== Career statistics ==
=== Club ===
As of 27 December 2022.

Club	Season	League			Cup		Other		Total	
Club	Season	Division	Apps	Goals	Apps	Goals	Apps	Goals	Apps	Goals
Peachtree City MOBA	2018	PDL	13	0	0	0	0	0	13	0
Des Moines Menace	2019	USL2	6	0	1	0	1 (Note: One appearance in USL League Two playoffs)	0	8	0
Maidenhead United	2020-21	National League	15	1	0	0	0	0	15	1
Walton Casuals	2021-22	SFL Premier Division South	27	1	0	0	2 (Note: One appearance and one goal in Surrey Senior Cup, one appearance in Southern League Cup)	1	29	2
Career total			61	2	1	0	3	1	65	3

=== International ===
As of match played 8 June 2024.

National team	Year	Apps	Goals
British Virgin Islands	2019	4	2
British Virgin Islands	2021	3	0
British Virgin Islands	2022	4	0
British Virgin Islands	2023	3	0
British Virgin Islands	2024	2	0
Total		16	2

=== International goals ===
Scores and results list the British Virgin Islands' goal tally first.

No	Date	Venue	Opponent	Score	Result	Competition
1.	21 March 2019	Raymond E. Guishard Technical Centre, The Valley, Anguilla	Turks and Caicos Islands	2–0	2–2	2019–20 CONCACAF Nations League qualification
2.	13 October 2019	Warner Park, Basseterre, Saint Kitts and Nevis	Bonaire	3–1	3–4	2019–20 CONCACAF Nations League C
