= José Ferrer (footballer, born 1996) =

Puerto Rican footballer

Personal information
- Full name: José Luis Ferrer
- Date of birth: 16 June 1996 (age 30)
- Place of birth: San Juan, Puerto Rico
- Position: Midfielder

Team information
- Current team: Metropolitan FA

Senior career*
Years	Team	Apps	(Gls)
- Metropolitan FA

International career
2019–	Puerto Rico	2	(0)
- * Club domestic league appearances and goals

José Ferrer (born 16 June 1996) is a Puerto Rican professional football player who plays for the Puerto Rican national team.

He debuted internationally on 24 March 2019 in a match against Grenada in a 0–2 defeat in the CONCACAF Nations League qualifying rounds, securing their position in League C.

On 15 October 2019, Ferrer scored his first goal for Puerto Rico in a match against Anguilla in a 2–3 victory in the CONCACAF Nations League.
