= Yeltsin Álvarez =

Guatemalan footballer (born 1994)

Personal information
- Full name: Yeltsin Delfino Álvarez Castro
- Date of birth: 22 November 1994 (age 31)
- Place of birth: San Agustín Acasaguastlán, Guatemala
- Height: 1.64 m (5 ft 5 in)
- Position: Midfielder

Team information
- Current team: Cobán Imperial
- Number: 8

Senior career*
Years	Team	Apps	(Gls)
2014–2016	Guastatoya	32	(3)
2016–2021	Cobán Imperial	172	(17)
2021–	Iztapa	21	(1)
2022–	Cobán Imperial	9	(0)

International career^{‡}
2018–	Guatemala	6	(2)
- * Club domestic league appearances and goals as of 8 February 2021 ‡ National team caps and goals as of 21 November 2019

Yeltsin Delfino Álvarez Castro (born 22 November 1994), is a Guatemalan professional footballer who plays as a midfielder for Liga Guate club Cobán Imperial and the Guatemala national team.

== International career ==
He debuted internationally in a friendly match on 15 August 2018 in a 3–0 victory against Cuba.

On 16 November 2019, Álvarez scored his first goal for Guatemala against Puerto Rico in a 5–0 victory promoting his team to League B in the CONCACAF Nations League.

== Career statistics ==
=== International goals ===
Scores and results list Guatemala's goal tally first.

No.	Date	Venue	Opponent	Score	Result	Competition
1.	16 November 2019	Estadio Doroteo Guamuch Flores, Guatemala City, Guatemala	Puerto Rico	4–0	5–0	2019–20 CONCACAF Nations League C
2.	21 November 2019	Estadio Israel Barrios, Coatepeque, Guatemala	Antigua and Barbuda	1–0	8–0	Friendly

== Honours ==
Cobán Imperial

- Liga Nacional de Guatemala: Apertura 2022
