= FC Saint-Louis Neuweg =

French football club

Saint-Louis Neuweg
- Full name: Football Club de Saint-Louis Neuweg
- Founded: 1990; 36 years ago
- Ground: Stade de la Frontière, Saint-Louis
- Chairman: Pierre Fichter
- Manager: Vincent Rychen
- League: Régional 1 Grand Est
- 2021–22: National 3 Group F, 13th (relegated)
- Website: slnfc.com

Football Club de Saint-Louis Neuweg is a French association football club founded in 1990. It is based in the town of Saint-Louis, Haut-Rhin and its home stadium is the Stade de la Frontière. As of the 2022–23 season, it plays in the sixth tier of French football.

== Current squad ==
As of 27 February 2019

Note: Flags indicate national team as defined under FIFA eligibility rules; some limited exceptions apply. Players may hold more than one non-FIFA nationality.

No.	Pos.	Nation	Player
—	GK	FRA	Maxime Juanole
—	GK	FRA	Thomas Navaux
—	GK	FRA	Julien Grondin
—	DF	FRA	Tieby Yao
—	DF	FRA	Jean-Christophe Vergerolle
—	DF	ANG	Jeancy Gaspard
—	DF	FRA	Jonathan Ellemaud
—	DF	FRA	Jude Varsovie
—	DF	FRA	Brian Sartori
—	DF	SEN	Fadel Niang
—	DF	CMR	Gerarld Tekwa
—	DF	BFA	Inoussa Ouedraogo

No.	Pos.	Nation	Player
—	DF	ANG	Alberto Futila
—	MF	FRA	Marwane Asad
—	MF	FRA	Samuel Yebra
—	MF	FRA	Steve Brom
—	MF	FRA	Tim Jabol
—	MF	FRA	Achraf Berriss
—	MF	FRA	David Biaou
—	MF	FRA	Doriano Elia
—	MF	FRA	Mamadou Camara
—	FW	FRA	Hamel Thiam
—	FW	MLI	Ibrahima Diallo
—	FW	FRA	Richard DaSylva
—	FW	FRA	Vidian Valérius

== Notable players ==
- (France) Tim Jabol-Folcarelli
