= Tyler Forbes (footballer, born 2002) =

British Virgin Islands footballer

Personal information
- Date of birth: 18 April 2002 (age 24)
- Place of birth: Road Town, British Virgin Islands
- Height: 1.78 m (5 ft 10 in)
- Position: Forward

Team information
- Current team: Tilbury

Youth career
- Maldon & Tiptree
- –2020: Heybridge Swifts

Senior career*
Years	Team	Apps	(Gls)
2020	Heybridge Swifts		
2020–2022	Poole Town	7	(1)
2022–2023	Weymouth	1	(0)
2023	Shaftesbury		
2024–2025	Poole Town	18	(0)
2025	Canvey Island	3	(0)
2025–	Tilbury	2	(0)

International career^{‡}
2018–	British Virgin Islands	43	(7)
- * Club domestic league appearances and goals ‡ National team caps and goals as of 4 October 2026

Tyler Forbes (born 18 April 2002) is a British Virgin Islander footballer who plays for Isthmian League North Division club Tilbury and the British Virgin Islands national team.

== Club career ==
In 2020, Forbes made the step up to Heybridge Swifts' first team from their youth set-up. Later that year, Forbes joined Poole Town.

In September 2025, Forbes joined Isthmian League North Division club Tilbury.

== International career ==
Forbes made his senior international debut on 16 October 2018, coming on for Leo Forte in the 60th minute of a 4–0 defeat to Martinique during CONCACAF Nations League qualifying. He scored his first senior international goal on 6 September 2019, in the 32nd minute of a 4–2 defeat to Bonaire during CONCACAF Nations League play.

== Career statistics ==
=== International ===
As of match played 4 October 2026

Appearances and goals by national team and year
National team	Year	Apps	Goals
British Virgin Islands	2018	1	0
British Virgin Islands	2019	6	3
British Virgin Islands	2021	4	0
British Virgin Islands	2022	4	0
British Virgin Islands	2023	5	1
British Virgin Islands	2024	8	0
British Virgin Islands	2025	7	1
British Virgin Islands	2026	8	2
Total		43	7

Scores and results list the British Virgin Islands' goal tally first.

List of international goals scored by Tyler Forbes
No.	Date	Venue	Opponent	Score	Result	Competition
1	6 September 2019	Ergilio Hato Stadium, Willemstad, Curaçao	Bonaire	1–0	2–4	2019–20 CONCACAF Nations League C
2	6 September 2019	Ergilio Hato Stadium, Willemstad, Curaçao	Bonaire	2–4	2–4	2019–20 CONCACAF Nations League C
3	13 October 2019	Warner Park, Basseterre, Saint Kitts and Nevis	Bonaire	2–1	3–4	2019–20 CONCACAF Nations League C
4	23 March 2023	A. O. Shirley Recreation Ground, Road Town, British Virgin Islands	Puerto Rico	1–0	1–3	2022–23 CONCACAF Nations League C
5	8 October 2025	Kirani James Athletic Stadium, St. George's, Grenada	Grenada	1–2	1–4	Friendly
6	29 March 2026	Truman Bodden Sports Complex, George Town, Cayman Islands	Anguilla	1–0	4–0	2025–26 CONCACAF Series
7	29 March 2026	Truman Bodden Sports Complex, George Town, Cayman Islands	Anguilla	3–0	4–0	2025–26 CONCACAF Series
