= CD Cobán Imperial =

Association football club in Guatemala

Cobán Imperial
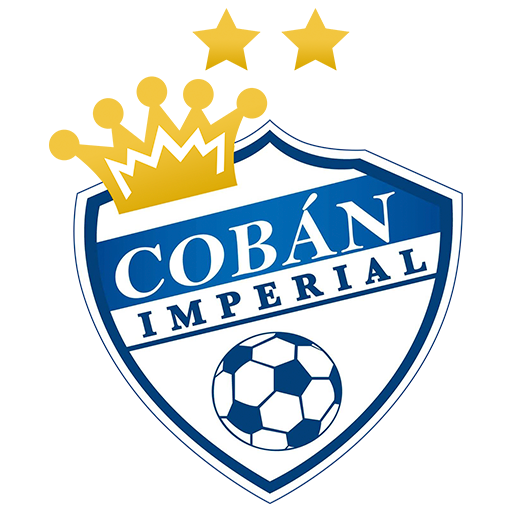
- Full name: Club Deportivo Cobán Imperial
- Nicknames: Los Príncipes Azules (The Blue Princes); Cobaneros (supporters)
- Founded: 1 August 1924; 101 years ago
- Ground: Estadio José Ángel Rossi
- Capacity: 15,000
- Chairman: Patricio Quinteros
- Manager: Sebastián Bini
- League: Liga Bantrab
- Clausura 2024: 4th (Quarterfinals)
- Website: https://m.facebook.com/CSDCobanImperial/?locale2=es_LA
Home colours	Away colours

Club Deportivo Cobán Imperial (Spanish pronunciation: [klˈub dˌepoɾtˈiβo koβˈan ˌimpeɾjˈal]), nicknamed Los Príncipes Azules ("The Blue Princes"), is a Guatemalan professional football club based in Cobán, Alta Verapaz. They compete in the Liga Bantrab, the top tier of Guatemalan football.

They play their home games in the Estadio Verapaz.

It is one of the traditional clubs of Guatemala, the club became league champions for the first time in 2004, when they defeated Municipal in the Clausura tournament final. The club was relegated from Liga Mayor after losing a play-off to Zacapa and spent 2007 until 2014 in the Primera División Group "A" or "B". Following a win over Mictlán in May 2015, Cobán was promoted to the Liga Mayor where they currently play.

== History ==
It was founded in 1924 participating for many years in the lower league. The club was invited to be part of the Cup Tournament in the Guatemalan major league in 1960 because they was a good team and their own stadium. Eduardo "Mondongo" Guzmán was the first coach of the Cobaneros, under the name of Magisterio de Cobán , they played only 3 games since from now on they did it under the name of 'Cobán Imperial'; during the tournament they must have played the number of 17 games, however Cobán only fulfilled 13 games since the rest no longer modified the standing, finishing in 14th.

Their debut was against the team called Aviateca tying for one goal, the first goal in its history was scored by player Mario Winter.

In 1964, they won promotion, but could not face more experienced teams and in 1966 they were relegated again. In 1975 when the "Jimmy Álvarez" team due to non-sports situations, changed venue, after its board managed to take part of people in the city of Cobán and therefore managing to change the name to "Cobán Imperial" thus achieving its third participation for 1976, taking advantage of it very well until 1988, when it again occupied the basement of the table. They returned with great vigour in 1994 and declined again in 1996, but achieved promotion again very quickly the following year in 1997, until the last time in 2006, when descended again, but the joy came again for the people of Cobán, on May 24, 2015, as Cobán Imperial defeated Mictlán 1–0 at the Estadio Mateo Flores. Being one of the teams that had many runners-up in a row, they earned the nickname or nickname of the "already merit" until he finally won the national championship at Mateo Flores national stadium in 2004.

== Rivalries ==
The club is one of the oldest and most successful football teams in Guatemala and Central America.

Their rivals are Zacapa, which is known as the Clásico del Norte.

== Stadium ==
The Estadio Jose Angel Rossi or better known as the Estadio Verapaz is located in the city of Cobán in the department of Alta Verapaz in Guatemala. It has a capacity for 15,000 in its different areas distributed among stands and skirts of hills, among whose pine trees the fans are located.

== Honours ==
=== Domestic honours ===
==== Leagues ====
- Liga Nacional de Guatemala and predecessors
  - Champions (2): 2004 Clausura, 2022 Apertura
- Copa de Guatemala and predecessors
  - Champions (1): 2018–19

== Performance in international competitions ==
- UNCAF Interclub Cup

2004 - First Round

- CONCACAF Central American Cup

2023 - Group Stage

== Players ==
=== Current squad ===
Note: Flags indicate national team as defined under FIFA eligibility rules; some limited exceptions apply. Players may hold more than one non-FIFA nationality.

No.	Pos.	Nation	Player
3	DF	PAR	Marcos Acosta
4	DF	BRA	Thales
5	DF	GUA	Selvin Teni
6	DF	GUA	Carlos Winter
7	MF	GUA	Oscar Mejía
8	MF	GUA	Yeltsin Álvarez
10	MF	CRC	Anthony López
14	DF	GUA	Luis de León
15	DF	GUA	Carlos Flores
17	DF	GUA	Ángel Cabrera
19	MF	GUA	Javier Estrada
20	DF	GUA	Blady Aldana
21	MF	GUA	Byron Leal
24	MF	GUA	Marco Rivas
25	FW	URU	Uri Amaral

No.	Pos.	Nation	Player
27	FW	GUA	Iker de la Rosa
28	FW	BRA	Janderson (captain)
30	DF	GUA	Eduardo Soto
31	MF	GUA	Diego Chen
32	MF	GUA	Bryan Lemus
33	GK	GUA	Victor Ayala
35	FW	PAR	Carlos Monges
40	MF	GUA	Steven Paredes
48	MF	GUA	Yonathan Morán
55	GK	GUA	Tomás Casas
77	FW	GUA	Juan Winter
92	DF	GUA	Edwin Rivas
97	FW	GUA	Julio Fajardo
98	MF	GUA	Julio Milla

=== In ===
Note: Flags indicate national team as defined under FIFA eligibility rules; some limited exceptions apply. Players may hold more than one non-FIFA nationality.

No.	Pos.	Nation	Player
—		GUA	TBD (From TBD)
—		GUA	TBD (From TBD)
—		GUA	TBD (From TBD)
—		GUA	TBD (From TBD)
—		GUA	TBD (From TBD)

No.	Pos.	Nation	Player
—		GUA	TBD (From TBD)
—		GUA	TBD (From TBD)
—		GUA	TBD (From TBD)

=== Out ===
Note: Flags indicate national team as defined under FIFA eligibility rules; some limited exceptions apply. Players may hold more than one non-FIFA nationality.

No.	Pos.	Nation	Player
—		GUA	TBD (To TBD)
—		GUA	TBD (To TBD)
—		GUA	TBD (To TBD)
—		GUA	TBD (To TBD)

No.	Pos.	Nation	Player
—		GUA	TBD (To TBD)
—		GUA	TBD (To TBD)
—		GUA	TBD (To TBD)
—		GUA	TBD (To TBD)

== Personnel ==
=== Coaching staff ===
As of June 2025

Position	Staff
Coach	(Guatemala) TBD (*)
Assistant manager	(Guatemala) TBD (*)
Reserve manager	(Guatemala) TBD (*)
Goalkeeper Coach	(Guatemala) TBD (*)
Under 17 Manager	(Guatemala) TBD (*)
Under 15 Manager	(Guatemala) TBD (*)
Sporting director	(Guatemala) TBD (*)
Fitness Coach	(Guatemala) TBD (*)
Team Doctor	(Guatemala) TBD (*)
Fitness Coach	(Guatemala) TBD (*)
Physiotherapy	(Guatemala) TBD (*)
Utility	(Guatemala) TBD (*)

== Managerial history ==
- (Uruguay) Rubén Amorín (1979)
- (Uruguay) Julio César Cortés (1997–1998)
- (Argentina) Héctor Trujillo (2000–2001)
- (Guatemala) Luís López Meneses (2001)
- (Uruguay) Julio González (2003)
- (Spain) Mario Reig (2004)
- (Guatemala) Julio César Antúnez (2007–2008)
- (Argentina) Carlos de Toro (2010)
- (Uruguay) Garabet Avedissian (2010–2011)
- (Guatemala) Amarini Villatoro (2011–2012)
- (Guatemala) Fabricio Benitez (2015–2016)
- (Argentina) Héctor Trujillo (2016)
- (Uruguay) Ariel Sena (2016–2017)
- (Guatemala) Fabricio Benitez (2017–2019)
- (El Salvador) Jorge Rodríguez (2019–2020)
- (Guatemala) Rafael Díaz (2020–2021)
- (Argentina) Ernesto Corti (2021)
- (Guatemala) Fabricio Benítez (2021)
- (Argentina) Sebastián Bini (2021–2022)
- (Mexico) Roberto Montoya (2022–2023)
- (Uruguay) Eduardo Méndez (2023)
- (Mexico) Adrian Arias (2024)
- (Mexico) Roberto Montoya (2024- 2025)
- (Mexico) José Luis Trejo (- August 2025)
- (Argentina) Sebastian Bini (August 2025 - December 2025)
- (Uruguay) Martin Garcia (December 2025 - Present)
