= 2018 FIFA World Cup qualification – CONCACAF third round =

Football tournament qualification stage

The third round of CONCACAF matches for 2018 FIFA World Cup qualification was played from 4 to 8 September 2015.

== Format ==
A total of twelve teams (teams ranked 7–8 in the CONCACAF entrant list and ten second round winners) played home-and-away over two legs. The six winners advanced to the fourth round.

== Seeding ==
The draw for the third round was held as part of the 2018 FIFA World Cup Preliminary Draw on 25 July 2015, starting 18:00 MSK (UTC+3), at the Konstantinovsky Palace in Strelna, Saint Petersburg, Russia.

The seeding was based on the FIFA World Rankings of August 2014 (shown in parentheses). The twelve teams were seeded into two pots:

- Pot 3 contained the teams ranked 1–6 (i.e., Jamaica and Haiti, ranked 7–8 in the CONCACAF entrant list, plus four higher-ranked second round winners).
- Pot 4 contained the teams ranked 7–12 (i.e., six lower-ranked second round winners).

Each tie contained a team from Pot 3 and a team from Pot 4, with the order of legs decided by draw.

Note: Bolded teams qualified for the fourth round.

Pot 3	Pot 4
1. **Jamaica** (85); 2. **Haiti** (117); 3. **Canada** (122); 4. Aruba (124); 5. **El Salvador** (127); 6. **Guatemala** (134)	7. **Saint Vincent and the Grenadines** (134); 8. Grenada (142); 9. Antigua and Barbuda (149); 10. Belize (162); 11. Nicaragua (175); 12. Curaçao (182)

Note: Guatemala were seeded into Pot 3 as they had more FIFA ranking points (203.24) than Saint Vincent and the Grenadines (202.53). In the FIFA World Rankings, teams shared the same ranking if their ranking points rounded to the same whole number.

== Matches ==
Team 1	Agg.	Team 2	1st leg	2nd leg
Curaçao	0–2	El Salvador	0–1	0–1
Canada	4–1	Belize	3–0	1–1
Grenada	1–6	Haiti	1–3	0–3
Jamaica	4–3	Nicaragua	2–3	2–0
Saint Vincent and the Grenadines	3–2	Aruba	2–0	1–2
Antigua and Barbuda	1–2	Guatemala	1–0	0–2

4 September 2015
19:05 UTC−4

Curaçao	0–1	El Salvador
	Report (FIFA); Report (CONCACAF)	Larín 12'

Ergilio Hato Stadium, Willemstad
Attendance: 6,000
Referee: Valdin Legister (Jamaica)
8 September 2015
19:35 UTC−6

El Salvador	1–0	Curaçao
Barrios 9'	Report (FIFA); Report (CONCACAF)

Estadio Cuscatlán, San Salvador
Attendance: 27,884
Referee: Ricardo Montero (Costa Rica)

El Salvador won 2–0 on aggregate and advanced to the fourth round (Group A).

4 September 2015
19:37 UTC−4

Canada	3–0	Belize
Ricketts 25', 63'; Hutchinson 90'	Report (FIFA); Report (CONCACAF)

BMO Field, Toronto
Attendance: 10,400
Referee: John Pitti (Panama)
8 September 2015
19:00 UTC−6

Belize	1–1	Canada
McCaulay 26'	Report (FIFA); Report (CONCACAF)	Johnson 45'

FFB Stadium, Belmopan
Attendance: 2,500
Referee: Javier Santos (Puerto Rico)

Canada won 4–1 on aggregate and advanced to the fourth round (Group A).

4 September 2015
16:21 UTC−4

Grenada	1–3	Haiti
Straker 33' (pen.)	Report (FIFA); Report (CONCACAF)	Maurice 27'; Jérôme 38'; Nazon 56'

National Cricket Stadium, St. George's
Attendance: 5,100
Referee: Héctor Rodríguez (Honduras)
8 September 2015
19:00 UTC−4

Haiti	3–0	Grenada
Guerrier 26'; Nazon 38'; Belfort 50'	Report (FIFA); Report (CONCACAF)

Stade Sylvio Cator, Port-au-Prince
Attendance: 13,764
Referee: David Gantar (Canada)

Haiti won 6–1 on aggregate and advanced to the fourth round (Group B).

4 September 2015
20:00 UTC−5

Jamaica	2–3	Nicaragua
Mattocks 69'; Mariappa 78'	Report (FIFA); Report (CONCACAF)	Rosas 5' (pen.); Chavarría 8'; Galeano 48'

Independence Park, Kingston
Attendance: 18,300
Referee: Marlon Mejía (El Salvador)
8 September 2015
19:30 UTC−6

Nicaragua	0–2	Jamaica
	Report (FIFA); Report (CONCACAF)	Mattocks 13'; Dawkins 89'

Nicaragua National Football Stadium, Managua
Attendance: 18,000
Referee: Oscar Reyna (Guatemala)

Jamaica won 4–3 on aggregate and advanced to the fourth round (Group B).

4 September 2015
15:30 UTC−4

Saint Vincent and the Grenadines	2–0	Aruba
Slater 51'; Anderson 90' (pen.)	Report (FIFA); Report (CONCACAF)

Arnos Vale Stadium, Kingstown
Attendance: 4,100
Referee: Rodphin Harris (Trinidad and Tobago)
8 September 2015
20:00 UTC−4

Aruba	2–1	Saint Vincent and the Grenadines
Danso 4', 50'	Report (FIFA); Report (CONCACAF)	Slater 84'

Trinidad Stadium, Oranjestad
Attendance: 950
Referee: José Alfredo Peñaloza (Mexico)

Saint Vincent and the Grenadines won 3–2 on aggregate and advanced to the fourth round (Group C).

4 September 2015
20:05 UTC−4

Antigua and Barbuda	1–0	Guatemala
Weston 72' (pen.)	Report (FIFA); Report (CONCACAF)

Sir Vivian Richards Stadium, North Sound
Attendance: 7,005
Referee: Armando Villarreal (United States)
8 September 2015
20:06 UTC−6

Guatemala	2–0	Antigua and Barbuda
Ruiz 61'; López 75'	Report (FIFA); Report (CONCACAF)

Estadio Mateo Flores, Guatemala City
Attendance: 5,206
Referee: Roberto García (Mexico)

Guatemala won 2–1 on aggregate and advanced to the fourth round (Group C).

== Goalscorers ==
There were 29 goals scored in 12 matches, for an average of 2.42 goals per match.

2 goals

- (Aruba) Erixon Danso
- (Canada) Tosaint Ricketts
- (Haiti) Duckens Nazon
- (Jamaica) Darren Mattocks
- (Saint Vincent and the Grenadines) Tevin Slater

1 goal

- (Antigua and Barbuda) Myles Weston
- (Belize) Deon McCaulay
- (Canada) Atiba Hutchinson
- (Canada) Will Johnson
- (El Salvador) Jonathan Barrios
- (El Salvador) Alexander Larín
- (Guatemala) Carlos Ruiz
- (Guatemala) Dennis López
- (Grenada) Anthony Straker
- (Haiti) Kervens Belfort
- (Haiti) Wilde-Donald Guerrier
- (Haiti) Mechack Jérôme
- (Haiti) Jean-Eudes Maurice
- (Jamaica) Simon Dawkins
- (Jamaica) Adrian Mariappa
- (Nicaragua) Carlos Chavarría
- (Nicaragua) Luis Galeano
- (Nicaragua) Manuel Rosas
- (Saint Vincent and the Grenadines) Oalex Anderson
