= 2018 FIFA World Cup qualification – CONCACAF second round =

Football tournament qualification stage

The second round of CONCACAF matches for 2018 FIFA World Cup qualification was played from 7 to 16 June 2015.

== Format ==
A total of 20 teams (teams ranked 9–21 in the CONCACAF entrant list and seven first round winners) played home-and-away over two legs. The ten winners advanced to the third round.

== Seeding ==
The draw for the second round was held on 15 January 2015, 19:40 EST (UTC−5), at the W Hotel at Miami Beach, Florida, United States.

The seeding was based on the FIFA World Rankings of August 2014 (shown in parentheses). The 20 teams were seeded into four pots:

- Pot 3 contained the teams ranked 8–10 (i.e., 16–18 in the CONCACAF entrant list).
- Pot 4 contained the teams ranked 11–13 (i.e., 19–21 in the CONCACAF entrant list).
- Pot 5 contained the teams ranked 1–7 (i.e., 9–15 in the CONCACAF entrant list).
- Pot 6 contained the seven first round winners.

Each tie contained a team from Pot 3 and a team from Pot 4 (first three ties), or a team from Pot 5 and a team from Pot 6 (last seven ties), with the order of legs decided by draw. As the draw was held before the first round was played, the identities of teams in Pot 6 (first round winners) were not known at the time of the draw.

Note: Bolded teams qualified for the third round.

Pot 3	Pot 4
8. **Saint Vincent and the Grenadines** (134); 9. Saint Lucia (138); 10. **Grenada** (142)	11. **Antigua and Barbuda** (149); 12. Guyana (153); 13. Puerto Rico (155)
Pot 5	Pot 6
1. **Canada** (122); 2. Cuba (124); 3. **Aruba** (124); 4. Dominican Republic (126); 5. **El Salvador** (127); 6. Suriname (131); 7. **Guatemala** (134)	14. Saint Kitts and Nevis (159); 15. **Belize** (162); 16. Dominica (168); 17. Barbados (169); 18. Bermuda (173); 19. **Nicaragua** (175); 20. **Curaçao** (182)

== Matches ==
Team 1	Agg.	Team 2	1st leg	2nd leg
Saint Vincent and the Grenadines	6–6 (a)	Guyana	2–2	4–4
Antigua and Barbuda	5–4	Saint Lucia	1–3	4–1
Puerto Rico	1–2	Grenada	1–0	0–2
Dominica	0–6 (Note: Order of legs reversed from originally published draw.)	Canada	0–2	0–4
Dominican Republic	1–5	Belize	1–2	0–3
Guatemala	1–0	Bermuda	0–0	1–0
Aruba	3–2	Barbados	0–2	3–0 (Note: FIFA awarded Aruba a 3–0 win as a result of Barbados fielding the ineligible player Hadan Holligan. Holligan failed to serve an automatic one match suspension for receiving two yellow cards earlier in the competition. The match originally ended 1–0 to Barbados.)
Saint Kitts and Nevis	3–6	El Salvador	2–2	1–4
Curaçao	1–1 (a)	Cuba	0–0	1–1
Nicaragua	4–1	Suriname	1–0	3–1

10 June 2015
15:30 UTC−4

Saint Vincent and the Grenadines	2–2	Guyana
Stewart 51'; Slater 84'	Report (FIFA); Report (CONCACAF)	Beresford 27'; Shakes 77'

Arnos Vale Stadium, Kingstown
Attendance: 2,500
Referee: Wilson Da Costa (Bahamas)
14 June 2015
19:00 UTC−4

Guyana	4–4	Saint Vincent and the Grenadines
Welshman 40', 77'; Danns 50' (pen.), 87'	Report (FIFA); Report (CONCACAF)	Samuel 16'; Slater 41', 58'; Anderson 67'

Providence Stadium, Providence
Attendance: 5,000
Referee: Valdin Legister (Jamaica)

6–6 on aggregate. Saint Vincent and the Grenadines won on the away goals rule and advanced to the third round.

10 June 2015
19:00 UTC−4

Antigua and Barbuda	1–3	Saint Lucia
Harriette 21'	Report (FIFA); Report (CONCACAF)	Paul 26'; Henry 61'; Greenidge 90+1'

Sir Vivian Richards Stadium, North Sound
Attendance: 1,800
Referee: Kimbett Ward (Saint Kitts and Nevis)
14 June 2015
19:00 UTC−4

Saint Lucia	1–4	Antigua and Barbuda
Frederick 81' (pen.)	Report (FIFA); Report (CONCACAF)	Parker 72', 90+3'; Harriette 85'; Tumwa 90+5'

Sir Vivian Richards Stadium, North Sound (Antigua and Barbuda) (Note: Both legs were played in Antigua and Barbuda due to the unavailability of a suitable home venue for Saint Lucia.)
Attendance: 700
Referee: David Gantar (Canada)

Antigua and Barbuda won 5–4 on aggregate and advanced to the third round.

12 June 2015
20:00 UTC−4

Puerto Rico	1–0	Grenada
Bozkurt 16'	Report (FIFA); Report (CONCACAF)

Juan Ramón Loubriel Stadium, Bayamón
Attendance: 6,890
Referee: Christopher Reid (Belize)
16 June 2015
15:30 UTC−4

Grenada	2–0	Puerto Rico
Morales 34' (o.g.); Ja. Charles 80'	Report (FIFA); Report (CONCACAF)

National Cricket Stadium, St. George's
Attendance: 5,000
Referee: Adrian Skeete (Barbados)

Grenada won 2–1 on aggregate and advanced to the third round.

11 June 2015
19:00 UTC−4

Dominica	0–2	Canada
	Report (FIFA); Report (CONCACAF)	Larin 5'; Teibert 64' (pen.)

Windsor Park, Roseau
Attendance: 5,084
Referee: Jeffrey Solís (Costa Rica)
16 June 2015
19:37 UTC−4

Canada	4–0	Dominica
Akindele 4'; Larin 41'; Ricketts 52', 78'	Report (FIFA); Report (CONCACAF)

BMO Field, Toronto
Attendance: 9,749
Referee: Gianni Ascani (Turks and Caicos Islands)

Canada won 6–0 on aggregate and advanced to the third round.

11 June 2015
16:00 UTC−4

Dominican Republic	1–2	Belize
Lombardi 71'	Report (FIFA); Report (CONCACAF)	McCaulay 13', 88'

Estadio Olímpico Félix Sánchez, Santo Domingo
Attendance: 1,500
Referee: Mario Escobar (Guatemala)
14 June 2015
16:00 UTC−6

Belize	3–0	Dominican Republic
Róchez 17'; Kuylen 38'; McCaulay 77'	Report (FIFA); Report (CONCACAF)

FFB Stadium, Belmopan
Attendance: 1,634
Referee: Sherwin Moore (Guyana)

Belize won 5–1 on aggregate and advanced to the third round.

12 June 2015
20:06 UTC−6

Guatemala	0–0	Bermuda
	Report (FIFA); Report (CONCACAF)

Estadio Mateo Flores, Guatemala City
Attendance: 5,279
Referee: Yadel Martínez (Cuba)
15 June 2015
19:30 UTC−3

Bermuda	0–1	Guatemala
	Report (FIFA); Report (CONCACAF)	Cincotta 27'

Bermuda National Stadium, Devonshire
Attendance: 3,747
Referee: Luis Enrique Santander (Mexico)

Guatemala won 1–0 on aggregate and advanced to the third round.

10 June 2015
20:00 UTC−4

Aruba	0–2	Barbados
	Report (FIFA); Report (CONCACAF)	Boyce 17', 29'

Trinidad Stadium, Oranjestad
Attendance: 2,700
Referee: Edvin Jurisevic (United States)
14 June 2015
19:30 UTC−4

Barbados	0–3 Awarded	Aruba
Holligan 79'	Report (FIFA); Report (CONCACAF)

Usain Bolt Sports Complex, Cave Hill
Attendance: 2,300
Referee: Marlon Mejía (El Salvador)

Aruba won 3–2 on aggregate and advanced to the third round.

11 June 2015
20:00 UTC−4

Saint Kitts and Nevis	2–2	El Salvador
Mitchum 68'; Sawyers 71'	Report (FIFA); Report (CONCACAF)	Herrera 41'; Bonilla 87'

Warner Park, Basseterre
Attendance: 3,100
Referee: Mathieu Bourdeau (Canada)
16 June 2015
19:00 UTC−6

El Salvador	4–1	Saint Kitts and Nevis
Cerén 3'; Bonilla 52', 80'; Álvarez 62'	Report (FIFA); Report (CONCACAF)	Harris 69'

Estadio Cuscatlán, San Salvador
Attendance: 9,830
Referee: Óscar Dávila (Nicaragua)

El Salvador won 6–3 on aggregate and advanced to the third round.

10 June 2015
20:00 UTC−4

Curaçao	0–0	Cuba
	Report (FIFA); Report (CONCACAF)

Ergilio Hato Stadium, Willemstad
Attendance: 10,000
Referee: Óscar Moncada (Honduras)
14 June 2015
16:00 UTC−4

Cuba	1–1	Curaçao
Márquez 5'	Report (FIFA); Report (CONCACAF)	Merencia 16'

Estadio Pedro Marrero, Havana
Attendance: 2,500
Referee: Jafeth Perea (Panama)

1–1 on aggregate. Curaçao won on the away goals rule and advanced to the third round.

7 June 2015
18:00 UTC−6

Nicaragua	1–0	Suriname
Chavarría 44'	Report (FIFA); Report (CONCACAF)

Nicaragua National Football Stadium, Managua
Attendance: 8,010
Referee: Javier Santos (Puerto Rico)
16 June 2015
16:30 UTC−3

Suriname	1–3	Nicaragua
Fer 3'	Report (FIFA); Report (CONCACAF)	Leguías 27'; Rosas 51'; Chavarría 90+3'

André Kamperveen Stadion, Paramaribo
Attendance: 3,500
Referee: Leo Clarke (Saint Lucia)

Nicaragua won 4–1 on aggregate and advanced to the third round.

== Goalscorers ==
There were 56 goals scored in 20 matches, for an average of 2.8 goals per match.

3 goals

- (Belize) Deon McCaulay
- (El Salvador) Nelson Bonilla
- (Saint Vincent and the Grenadines) Tevin Slater

2 goals

- (Antigua and Barbuda) Tevaughn Harriette
- (Antigua and Barbuda) Josh Parker
- (Barbados) Emmerson Boyce
- (Canada) Cyle Larin
- (Canada) Tosaint Ricketts
- (Guyana) Neil Danns
- (Guyana) Emery Welshman
- (Nicaragua) Carlos Chavarría

1 goal

- (Antigua and Barbuda) Aaron Tumwa
- (Barbados) Hadan Holligan
- (Belize) Elroy Kuylen
- (Belize) Harrison Róchez
- (Canada) Tesho Akindele
- (Canada) Russell Teibert
- (Cuba) Yénier Márquez
- (Curaçao) Papito Merencia
- (Dominican Republic) Geremy Lombardi
- (El Salvador) Arturo Álvarez
- (El Salvador) Darwin Cerén
- (El Salvador) Irvin Herrera
- (Grenada) Jamal Charles
- (Guatemala) Stefano Cincotta
- (Guyana) Brandon Beresford
- (Guyana) Ricky Shakes
- (Nicaragua) Raúl Leguías
- (Nicaragua) Manuel Rosas
- (Puerto Rico) Deniz Bozkurt
- (Saint Kitts and Nevis) Atiba Harris
- (Saint Kitts and Nevis) Orlando Mitchum
- (Saint Kitts and Nevis) Romaine Sawyers
- (Saint Lucia) Kurt Frederick
- (Saint Lucia) Troy Greenidge
- (Saint Lucia) David Henry
- (Saint Lucia) Tremain Paul
- (Saint Vincent and the Grenadines) Oalex Anderson
- (Saint Vincent and the Grenadines) Myron Samuel
- (Saint Vincent and the Grenadines) Cornelius Stewart
- (Suriname) Roxey Fer

1 own goal

- (Puerto Rico) Joan Morales (against Grenada)
