= List of international goals scored by Carlos Ruiz =

Carlos Ruiz is a former Guatemalan professional footballer who represented the Guatemalan national football team as a striker. Widely considered to be the greatest Guatemalan player of all time, he would go on to earn 133 caps and score 68 goals, becoming both his country’s most capped player and top goalscorer of all time

Ruiz made his international debut in a friendly against Mexico on the 18 November 1998; with his first goal coming less than a year later against El Salvador at the 1999 UNCAF Nations Cup. He became Guatemala’s all time top goalscorer on the 14th June 2008 with four goals against Saint Lucia, bringing his overall total to 39 goals, breaking the previous record of 35 goals held by Juan Carlos Plata.

In his final international appearance on the 6th September 2016, Ruiz scored 5 goals against Saint Vincent and the Grenadines in 2018 FIFA World Cup qualification. This brought his total record in World Cup qualification to 39 goals in 47 goals, surpassing Ali Daei's record of 35 goals and thus becoming the top goalscorer in history of qualification. This record remained until the 14th October 2025 when it was surpassed by Cristiano Ronaldo, who scored two goals against Hungary to set the new record of 41 goals.

== International goals ==
Scores and results list Guatemala's goal tally first, score column indicates score after each Ruiz goal.

List of international goals scored by Carlos Ruiz
No.	Cap	Date	Venue	Opponent	Score	Result	Competition	Ref.
1	7	19 March 1999	Estadio Nacional, San José, Costa Rica	El Salvador	1–1	1–1	1999 UNCAF Nations Cup	
2	17	17 June 2000	Estadio Nacional Mateo Flores, Guatemala City, Guatemala	Antigua and Barbuda	2–0	8–1	2002 FIFA World Cup qualification	
3	18	3 July 2000	Montreal, Canada	Haiti	–	4–1	Friendly	
4	20	16 July 2000	Carlos Salazar Hijo Stadium, Mazatenango, Guatemala	United States	1–1	1–1	2002 FIFA World Cup qualification	
5	21	22 July 2000	Mario Camposeco Stadium, Quetzaltenango, Guatemala	Barbados	1–0	2–0	2002 FIFA World Cup qualification	
6	23	8 October 2000	Barbados National Stadium, Saint Michael, Barbados	Barbados	2–0	3–1	2002 FIFA World Cup qualification	
7	24	15 November 2000	Carlos Salazar Hijo Stadium, Mazatenango, Guatemala	Costa Rica	1–0	2–1	2002 FIFA World Cup qualification	
8	24	15 November 2000	Carlos Salazar Hijo Stadium, Mazatenango, Guatemala	Costa Rica	2–1	2–1	2002 FIFA World Cup qualification	
9	25	6 January 2001	Miami Orange Bowl, Miami, United States	Costa Rica	1–0	2–5	2002 FIFA World Cup qualification	
10	25	6 January 2001	Miami Orange Bowl, Miami, United States	Costa Rica	2–5	2–5	2002 FIFA World Cup qualification	
11	26	6 January 2002	Pedro Marrero Stadium, Havana, Cuba	Cuba	1–0	1–0	Friendly	
12	31	31 October 2002	Cementos Progreso Stadium, Guatemala City, Guatemala	Jamaica	1–0	1–1	Friendly	
13	36	18 February 2003	Rommel Fernández Stadium, Panama City, Panama	Nicaragua	1–0	5–0	2003 UNCAF Nations Cup	
14	36	18 February 2003	Rommel Fernández Stadium, Panama City, Panama	Nicaragua	2–0	5–0	2003 UNCAF Nations Cup	
15	36	18 February 2003	Rommel Fernández Stadium, Panama City, Panama	Nicaragua	3–0	5–0	2003 UNCAF Nations Cup	
16	40	16 July 2003	Miami Orange Bowl, Miami, United States	Colombia	1–0	1–1	2003 CONCACAF Gold Cup	
17	41	5 May 2004	Estadio Nacional Mateo Flores, Guatemala City, Guatemala	Haiti	1–0	1–0	Friendly	
18	42	20 June 2004	Estadio Nacional Mateo Flores, Guatemala City, Guatemala	Suriname	1–0	3–1	2006 FIFA World Cup qualification	
19	42	20 June 2004	Estadio Nacional Mateo Flores, Guatemala City, Guatemala	Suriname	3–1	3–1	2006 FIFA World Cup qualification	
20	44	18 August 2004	Swangard Stadium, Burnaby, Canada	Canada	1–0	2–0	2006 FIFA World Cup qualification	
21	44	18 August 2004	Swangard Stadium, Burnaby, Canada	Canada	2–0	2–0	2006 FIFA World Cup qualification	
22	46	8 September 2004	Estadio Olímpico Metropolitano, San Pedro Sula, Honduras	Honduras	1–0	2–2	2006 FIFA World Cup qualification	
23	47	13 October 2004	Estadio Nacional Mateo Flores, Guatemala City, Guatemala	Honduras	1–0	1–0	2006 FIFA World Cup qualification	
24	49	13 November 2004	RFK Stadium, Washington, D.C., United States	Bolivia	1–0	1–0	Friendly	
25	51	21 December 2004	Brígido Iriarte Stadium, Caracas, Venezuela	Venezuela	1–0	1–0	Friendly	
26	52	17 January 2005	Los Angeles Coliseum, Los Angeles, United States	Colombia	1–0	1–1	Friendly	
27	55	26 March 2005	Estadio Nacional Mateo Flores, Guatemala City, Guatemala	Trinidad and Tobago	2–0	5–1	2006 FIFA World Cup qualification	
28	55	26 March 2005	Estadio Nacional Mateo Flores, Guatemala City, Guatemala	Trinidad and Tobago	3–1	5–1	2006 FIFA World Cup qualification	
29	58	8 July 2005	Home Depot Center, Carson, United States	Jamaica	1–2	3–4	2005 CONCACAF Gold Cup	
30	58	8 July 2005	Home Depot Center, Carson, United States	Jamaica	2–3	3–4	2005 CONCACAF Gold Cup	
31	58	8 July 2005	Home Depot Center, Carson, United States	Jamaica	3–4	3–4	2005 CONCACAF Gold Cup	
32	63	8 October 2005	Estadio Alfonso Lastras, San Luis Potosí, Mexico	Mexico	1–0	2–5	2006 FIFA World Cup qualification	
33	64	12 October 2005	Estadio Nacional Mateo Flores, Guatemala City, Guatemala	Costa Rica	3–0	3–1	2006 FIFA World Cup qualification	
34	68	10 October 2006	Herndon Stadium, Atlanta, United States	Honduras	1–2	1–2	Friendly	
35	72	12 June 2007	Gillette Stadium, Foxborough, United States	Trinidad and Tobago	1–0	1–1	2007 CONCACAF Gold Cup	
36	77	14 June 2008	Estadio Nacional Mateo Flores, Guatemala City, Guatemala	Saint Lucia	2–0	6–0	2010 FIFA World Cup qualification	
37	77	14 June 2008	Estadio Nacional Mateo Flores, Guatemala City, Guatemala	Saint Lucia	3–0	6–0	2010 FIFA World Cup qualification	
38	77	14 June 2008	Estadio Nacional Mateo Flores, Guatemala City, Guatemala	Saint Lucia	4–0	6–0	2010 FIFA World Cup qualification	
39	77	14 June 2008	Estadio Nacional Mateo Flores, Guatemala City, Guatemala	Saint Lucia	6–0	6–0	2010 FIFA World Cup qualification	
40	81	10 September 2008	Estadio Nacional Mateo Flores, Guatemala City, Guatemala	Cuba	1–1	4–1	2010 FIFA World Cup qualification	
41	81	10 September 2008	Estadio Nacional Mateo Flores, Guatemala City, Guatemala	Cuba	2–1	4–1	2010 FIFA World Cup qualification	
42	87	28 March 2011	Carlos Salazar Hijo Stadium, Mazatenango, Guatemala	Bolivia	1–0	1–1	Friendly	
43	90	13 June 2011	Red Bull Arena, Harrison, United States	Grenada	3–0	4–0	2011 CONCACAF Gold Cup	
44	91	18 June 2011	New Meadowlands Stadium, East Rutherford, United States	Mexico	1–0	1–2	2011 CONCACAF Gold Cup	
45	92	11 October 2011	Estadio Nacional Mateo Flores, Guatemala City, Guatemala	Belize	3–1	3–1	2014 FIFA World Cup qualification	
46	93	22 February 2012	Estadio Feliciano Cáceres, Luque, Paraguay	Paraguay	1–2	1–2	Friendly	
47	95	25 May 2012	Estadio Nacional, San José, Costa Rica	Costa Rica	1–0	2–3	Friendly	
48	95	25 May 2012	Estadio Nacional, San José, Costa Rica	Costa Rica	2–2	2–3	Friendly	
49	96	1 June 2012	Estadio Nacional Mateo Flores, Guatemala City, Guatemala	Costa Rica	1–0	1–0	Friendly	
50	100	15 August 2012	RFK Stadium, Washington, D.C., United States	Paraguay	3–3	3–3	Friendly	
51	101	7 September 2012	Estadio Nacional Mateo Flores, Guatemala City, Guatemala	Antigua and Barbuda	1–1	3–1	2014 FIFA World Cup qualification	
52	101	7 September 2012	Estadio Nacional Mateo Flores, Guatemala City, Guatemala	Antigua and Barbuda	2–1	3–1	2014 FIFA World Cup qualification	
53	102	11 September 2012	Sir Vivian Richards Stadium, North Sound, Antigua and Barbuda	Antigua and Barbuda	1–0	1–0	2014 FIFA World Cup qualification	
54	103	12 October 2012	Estadio Nacional Mateo Flores, Guatemala City, Guatemala	Jamaica	2–1	2–1	2014 FIFA World Cup qualification	
55	104	16 October 2012	Livestrong Sporting Park, Kansas City, United States	United States	1–0	1–3	2014 FIFA World Cup qualification	
56	107	7 September 2014	Cotton Bowl, Dallas, United States	Belize	1–0	2–1	2014 Copa Centroamericana	
57	109	13 September 2014	Los Angeles Coliseum, Los Angeles, United States	Costa Rica	1–0	1–2	2014 Copa Centroamericana	
58	118	9 July 2015	Soldier Field, Chicago, United States	Trinidad and Tobago	1–3	1–3	2015 CONCACAF Gold Cup	
59	122	8 September 2015	Estadio Nacional Mateo Flores, Guatemala City, Guatemala	Antigua and Barbuda	2–0	2–0	2018 FIFA World Cup qualification	
60	127	25 March 2016	Estadio Nacional Mateo Flores, Guatemala City, Guatemala	United States	2–0	2–0	2018 FIFA World Cup qualification	
61	129	28 May 2016	StubHub Center, Carson, United States	Armenia	1–0	1–7	Friendly	
62	132	2 September 2016	Hasely Crawford Stadium, Port of Spain, Trinidad and Tobago	Trinidad and Tobago	1–0	2–2	2018 FIFA World Cup qualification	
63	132	2 September 2016	Hasely Crawford Stadium, Port of Spain, Trinidad and Tobago	Trinidad and Tobago	2–2	2–2	2018 FIFA World Cup qualification	
64	133	6 September 2016	Estadio Nacional Mateo Flores, Guatemala City, Guatemala	Saint Vincent and the Grenadines	2–1	9–3	2018 FIFA World Cup qualification	
65	133	6 September 2016	Estadio Nacional Mateo Flores, Guatemala City, Guatemala	Saint Vincent and the Grenadines	3–1	9–3	2018 FIFA World Cup qualification	
66	133	6 September 2016	Estadio Nacional Mateo Flores, Guatemala City, Guatemala	Saint Vincent and the Grenadines	4–2	9–3	2018 FIFA World Cup qualification	
67	133	6 September 2016	Estadio Nacional Mateo Flores, Guatemala City, Guatemala	Saint Vincent and the Grenadines	6–2	9–3	2018 FIFA World Cup qualification	
68	133	6 September 2016	Estadio Nacional Mateo Flores, Guatemala City, Guatemala	Saint Vincent and the Grenadines	7–2	9–3	2018 FIFA World Cup qualification	

== Hat-tricks ==
Scores and results list Guatemala's goal tally first.

No.	Date	Venue	Opponent	Goals	Result	Competition	Ref.
1	18 February 2003	Rommel Fernández Stadium, Panama City, Panama	Nicaragua	3 – (34', 45', 67')	5–0	2003 UNCAF Nations Cup	
2	8 July 2005	Home Depot Center, Carson, United States	Jamaica	3 – (11' pen, 45+3', 87')	3–4	2005 CONCACAF Gold Cup	
3	14 June 2008	Estadio Nacional Mateo Flores, Guatemala City, Guatemala	Saint Lucia	4 – (36', 40', 58', 93')	6–0	2010 FIFA World Cup qualification	
4	6 September 2016	Estadio Nacional Mateo Flores, Guatemala City, Guatemala	Saint Vincent and the Grenadines	5 – (20', 28', 37', 58', 60')	9–3	2018 FIFA World Cup qualification	

== Statistics ==
Appearances and goals by year
Year	Apps	Goals
1998	1	0
1999	13	1
2000	10	7
2001	1	2
2002	6	2
2003	9	4
2004	11	9
2005	13	8
2006	4	1
2007	7	1
2008	8	6
2011	9	4
2012	12	10
2014	6	2
2015	16	2
2016	7	9
Total	133	68

Goals by competition
Competition	Goals
FIFA World Cup qualification	39
Copa Centroamericana/UNCAF Nations Cup	6
CONCACAF Gold Cup	8
Friendlies	15
Total	68

Goals by opponent
Opponent	Goals
Costa Rica	9
Trinidad and Tobago	6
Antigua and Barbuda	5
Jamaica	5
Saint Vincent and the Grenadines	5
Saint Lucia	4
Cuba	3
Honduras	3
Nicaragua	3
United States	3
Barbados	2
Belize	2
Bolivia	2
Canada	2
Colombia	2
Haiti	2
Mexico	2
Paraguay	2
Suriname	2
Armenia	1
El Salvador	1
Grenada	1
Venezuela	1
Total	68
