= 2018 FIFA World Cup qualification – CONCACAF fourth round =

The fourth round of CONCACAF matches for 2018 FIFA World Cup qualification was played from 13 November 2015 to 6 September 2016.

== Format ==
A total of 12 teams (teams ranked 1 to 6 in the CONCACAF entrant list and 6 third round winners) were divided into three groups of four teams each. In each group, teams played against each other home-and-away in a round-robin format for a total of six matches per team. The top two teams of each group (three group winners and three runners-up) advanced to the fifth round (also called the 'Hexagonal' or 'Hex').

== Seeding ==
The draw for the fourth round was held as part of the 2018 FIFA World Cup Preliminary Draw on 25 July 2015, starting 18:00 MSK (UTC+3), at the Konstantinovsky Palace in Strelna, Saint Petersburg, Russia.

The seeding was based on the FIFA World Rankings of August 2014 (shown in parentheses). The six direct qualifiers are seeded into two pots:

- Pot 1 contains the teams ranked 1–3.
- Pot 2 contains the teams ranked 4–6.

Each group contained a team from Pot 1, a team from Pot 2, and two third round winners which were automatically allocated into each group (series winners 1 and 2 into Group A, series winners 3 and 4 into Group B, series winners 5 and 6 into Group C). As the draw was held before the third round was played, the identities of the third round winners were not known at the time of the draw. The fixtures of each group were automatically decided based on the respective pot or series won of each team.

Note: Bolded teams qualified for the fifth round.

Pot 1	Pot 2
1. **Costa Rica** (15); 2. **Mexico** (17); 3. **United States** (18)	4. **Honduras** (43); 5. **Panama** (63); 6. **Trinidad and Tobago** (80)
third round winners
7. Jamaica (85); 8. Haiti (117); 9. Canada (122); 10. El Salvador (127); 11. Guatemala (134); 12. Saint Vincent and the Grenadines (134)

== Groups ==
2018 FIFA World Cup qualification tiebreakers
In league format, the ranking of teams in each group was based on the following criteria (regulations Articles 20.6 and 20.7):
1. Points (3 points for a win, 1 point for a draw, 0 points for a loss)
2. Overall goal difference
3. Overall goals scored
4. Points in matches between tied teams
5. Goal difference in matches between tied teams
6. Goals scored in matches between tied teams
7. Away goals scored in matches between tied teams (if the tie was only between two teams in home-and-away league format)
8. Fair play points
  - first yellow card: minus 1 point
  - indirect red card (second yellow card): minus 3 points
  - direct red card: minus 4 points
  - yellow card and direct red card: minus 5 points
9. Drawing of lots by the FIFA Organising Committee

=== Group A ===
Pos	Team	Pld	W	D	L	GF	GA	GD	Pts	Qualification	Mexico	Honduras	Canada	El Salvador
1	Mexico	6	5	1	0	13	1	+12	16	Advance to fifth round	—	0–0	2–0	3–0
2	Honduras	6	2	2	2	6	6	0	8	Advance to fifth round	0–2	—	2–1	2–0
3	Canada	6	2	1	3	5	8	−3	7		0–3	1–0	—	3–1
4	El Salvador	6	0	2	4	4	13	−9	2		1–3	2–2	0–0	—

Source: FIFA
Rules for classification: Qualification tiebreakers
13 November 2015
20:00 UTC−6

Mexico	3–0	El Salvador
Guardado 7'; Herrera 42'; Vela 64'	Report (FIFA); Report (CONCACAF)

Estadio Azteca, Mexico City
Attendance: 57,623
Referee: Walter López Castellanos (Guatemala)
13 November 2015
19:08 UTC−8

Canada	1–0	Honduras
Larin 38'	Report (FIFA); Report (CONCACAF)

BC Place, Vancouver
Attendance: 20,108
Referee: Kevin Morrison (Jamaica)

17 November 2015
15:00 UTC−6

Honduras	0–2	Mexico
	Report (FIFA); Report (CONCACAF)	Corona 67'; Damm 72'

Estadio Olímpico Metropolitano, San Pedro Sula
Attendance: 35,209
Referee: John Pitti (Panama)
17 November 2015
19:30 UTC−6

El Salvador	0–0	Canada
	Report (FIFA); Report (CONCACAF)

Estadio Cuscatlán, San Salvador
Attendance: 6,816
Referee: Mark Geiger (United States)

25 March 2016
19:06 UTC−6

El Salvador	2–2	Honduras
Punyed 45+2'; Bonilla 88'	Report (FIFA); Report (CONCACAF)	Elis 19'; Lozano 59'

Estadio Cuscatlán, San Salvador
Attendance: 9,915
Referee: Javier Santos (Puerto Rico)
25 March 2016
19:08 UTC−7

Canada	0–3	Mexico
	Report (FIFA); Report (CONCACAF)	Hernández 32'; Lozano 40'; Corona 72'

BC Place, Vancouver
Attendance: 54,798
Referee: Kimbell Ward (Saint Kitts and Nevis)

29 March 2016
19:06 UTC−6

Honduras	2–0	El Salvador
García 52'; Quioto 90+4'	Report (FIFA); Report (CONCACAF)

Estadio Olímpico Metropolitano, San Pedro Sula
Attendance: 38,000
Referee: Ricardo Montero (Costa Rica)
29 March 2016
20:30 UTC−6

Mexico	2–0	Canada
Guardado 17' (pen.); Corona 45+3'	Report (FIFA); Report (CONCACAF)

Estadio Azteca, Mexico City
Attendance: 64,430
Referee: Yadel Martínez (Cuba)

2 September 2016
15:06 UTC−6

Honduras	2–1	Canada
Martínez 45+2'; Quioto 50'	Report (FIFA); Report (CONCACAF)	James 35'

Estadio Olímpico Metropolitano, San Pedro Sula
Attendance: 39,000
Referee: Yadel Martínez (Cuba)
2 September 2016
20:06 UTC−6

El Salvador	1–3	Mexico
Larín 24' (pen.)	Report (FIFA); Report (CONCACAF)	Moreno 52'; Sepúlveda 58'; Jiménez 73' (pen.)

Estadio Cuscatlán, San Salvador
Attendance: 24,500
Referee: Armando Villarreal (United States)

6 September 2016
21:00 UTC−5

Mexico	0–0	Honduras
	Report (FIFA); Report (CONCACAF)

Estadio Azteca, Mexico City
Attendance: 41,008
Referee: Mark Geiger (United States)
6 September 2016
19:00 UTC−7

Canada	3–1	El Salvador
Larin 11'; Ledgerwood 53'; Edgar 90+2'	Report (FIFA); Report (CONCACAF)	Bonilla 78'

BC Place, Vancouver
Attendance: 20,726
Referee: Valdin Legister (Jamaica)

=== Group B ===
Pos	Team	Pld	W	D	L	GF	GA	GD	Pts	Qualification	Costa Rica	Panama	Haiti	Jamaica
1	Costa Rica	6	5	1	0	11	3	+8	16	Advance to fifth round	—	3–1	1–0	3–0
2	Panama	6	3	1	2	7	5	+2	10	Advance to fifth round	1–2	—	1–0	2–0
3	Haiti	6	1	1	4	2	4	−2	4		0–1	0–0	—	0–1
4	Jamaica	6	1	1	4	2	10	−8	4		1–1	0–2	0–2	—

Source: FIFA
Rules for classification: Qualification tiebreakers
13 November 2015
20:00 UTC−6

Costa Rica	1–0	Haiti
Gamboa 29'	Report (FIFA); Report (CONCACAF)

Estadio Nacional de Costa Rica, San José
Attendance: 35,000
Referee: Yadel Martínez (Cuba)
13 November 2015
21:00 UTC−5

Jamaica	0–2	Panama
	Report (FIFA); Report (CONCACAF)	Cooper 43'; Morgan 52' (o.g.)

Independence Park, Kingston
Attendance: 18,000
Referee: Roberto García (Mexico)

17 November 2015
19:00 UTC−4

Haiti	0–1	Jamaica
	Report (FIFA); Report (CONCACAF)	Donaldson 62'

Stade Sylvio Cator, Port-au-Prince
Attendance: 12,000
Referee: Javier Santos (Puerto Rico)
17 November 2015
20:30 UTC−5

Panama	1–2	Costa Rica
Tejada 71'	Report (FIFA); Report (CONCACAF)	Ruiz 66'; Ureña 69'

Estadio Rommel Fernández, Panama City
Attendance: 26,607
Referee: Joel Aguilar (El Salvador)

25 March 2016
19:00 UTC−5

Jamaica	1–1	Costa Rica
Watson 16'	Report (FIFA); Report (CONCACAF)	Acosta 67'

Independence Park, Kingston
Attendance: 21,500
Referee: Jair Marrufo (United States)
25 March 2016
19:00 UTC−5

Haiti	0–0	Panama
	Report (FIFA); Report (CONCACAF)

Stade Sylvio Cator, Port-au-Prince
Attendance: 12,000
Referee: Oscar Reyna (Guatemala)

29 March 2016
20:30 UTC−5

Panama	1–0	Haiti
Baloy 81'	Report (FIFA); Report (CONCACAF)

Estadio Rommel Fernández, Panama City
Attendance: 13,082
Referee: Óscar Moncada (Honduras)
29 March 2016
20:00 UTC−6

Costa Rica	3–0	Jamaica
Borges 7'; Ruiz 37'; Venegas 76'	Report (FIFA); Report (CONCACAF)

Estadio Nacional de Costa Rica, San José
Attendance: 35,062
Referee: Drew Fischer (Canada)

2 September 2016
19:00 UTC−5

Haiti	0–1	Costa Rica
	Report (FIFA); Report (CONCACAF)	Azofeifa 71'

Stade Sylvio Cator, Port-au-Prince
Attendance: 3,200
Referee: Marlon Mejía (El Salvador)
2 September 2016
20:30 UTC−5

Panama	2–0	Jamaica
Torres 28'; Arroyo 90+2'	Report (FIFA); Report (CONCACAF)

Estadio Rommel Fernández, Panama City
Attendance: 19,717
Referee: Joel Aguilar (El Salvador)

6 September 2016
20:30 UTC−5

Jamaica	0–2	Haiti
	Report (FIFA); Report (CONCACAF)	Lafrance 68'; Nazon 88'

Independence Park, Kingston
Attendance: 3,500
Referee: Adrian Skeete (Barbados)
6 September 2016
19:30 UTC−6

Costa Rica	3–1	Panama
Bolaños 19', 79'; Matarrita 84'	Report (FIFA); Report (CONCACAF)	Tejada 90' (pen.)

Estadio Nacional de Costa Rica, San José
Attendance: 34,219
Referee: Roberto García (Mexico)

=== Group C ===
Pos	Team	Pld	W	D	L	GF	GA	GD	Pts	Qualification	United States	Trinidad and Tobago	Guatemala	Saint Vincent and the Grenadines
1	United States	6	4	1	1	20	3	+17	13	Advance to fifth round	—	4–0	4–0	6–1
2	Trinidad and Tobago	6	3	2	1	13	9	+4	11	Advance to fifth round	0–0	—	2–2	6–0
3	Guatemala	6	3	1	2	18	11	+7	10		2–0	1–2	—	9–3
4	Saint Vincent and the Grenadines	6	0	0	6	6	34	−28	0		0–6	2–3	0–4	—

Source: FIFA
Rules for classification: Qualification tiebreakers
13 November 2015
18:10 UTC−6

United States	6–1	Saint Vincent and the Grenadines
Wood 11'; Johnson 29'; Altidore 31', 74'; Cameron 51'; Zardes 58'	Report (FIFA); Report (CONCACAF)	Anderson 5'

Busch Stadium, St. Louis
Attendance: 43,433
Referee: Jeffrey Solís (Costa Rica)
13 November 2015
19:06 UTC−6

Guatemala	1–2	Trinidad and Tobago
Mejía 90'	Report (FIFA); Report (CONCACAF)	Hyland 67'; K. Jones 80'

Estadio Mateo Flores, Guatemala City
Attendance: 18,313
Referee: Mathieu Bourdeau (Canada)

17 November 2015
15:30 UTC−4

Saint Vincent and the Grenadines	0–4	Guatemala
	Report (FIFA); Report (CONCACAF)	Cincotta 23'; M. López 32'; D. López 48'; Tinoco 81'

Arnos Vale Stadium, Kingstown
Attendance: 3,500
Referee: Drew Fischer (Canada)
17 November 2015
19:36 UTC−4

Trinidad and Tobago	0–0	United States
	Report (FIFA); Report (CONCACAF)

Hasely Crawford Stadium, Port of Spain
Attendance: 22,809
Referee: César Ramos (Mexico)

25 March 2016
15:30 UTC−4

Saint Vincent and the Grenadines	2–3	Trinidad and Tobago
M. Samuel 45' (pen.); S. Samuel 77'	Report (FIFA); Report (CONCACAF)	J. Jones 58'; L. García 71', 82'

Arnos Vale Stadium, Kingstown
Attendance: 3,000
Referee: José Kellys (Panama)
25 March 2016
20:06 UTC−6

Guatemala	2–0	United States
Morales 7'; Ruiz 15'	Report (FIFA); Report (CONCACAF)

Estadio Mateo Flores, Guatemala City
Attendance: 18,313
Referee: Jafeth Perea (Panama)

29 March 2016
19:00 UTC−4

Trinidad and Tobago	6–0	Saint Vincent and the Grenadines
Bateau 36'; J. Jones 49'; K. Jones 60'; Molino 66'; Caesar 86', 89'	Report (FIFA); Report (CONCACAF)

Hasely Crawford Stadium, Port of Spain
Attendance: 10,800
Referee: Sandy Vásquez (Dominican Republic)
29 March 2016
19:25 UTC−4

United States	4–0	Guatemala
Dempsey 12'; Cameron 35'; Zusi 46'; Altidore 89'	Report (FIFA); Report (CONCACAF)

Mapfre Stadium, Columbus
Attendance: 20,654
Referee: Valdin Legister (Jamaica)

2 September 2016
15:30 UTC−4

Saint Vincent and the Grenadines	0–6	United States
	Report (FIFA); Report (CONCACAF)	Wood 28'; Besler 32'; Altidore 43' (pen.); Pulisic 71', 90+2'; Kljestan 78'

Arnos Vale Stadium, Kingstown
Attendance: 6,200
Referee: Mathieu Bourdeau (Canada)
2 September 2016
19:00 UTC−4

Trinidad and Tobago	2–2	Guatemala
J. Jones 45+1', 62'	Report (FIFA); Report (CONCACAF)	Ruiz 36', 87'

Hasely Crawford Stadium, Port of Spain
Attendance: 20,147
Referee: John Pitti (Panama)

6 September 2016
20:15 UTC−4

United States	4–0	Trinidad and Tobago
Kljestan 44'; Altidore 59', 62'; Arriola 71'	Report (FIFA); Report (CONCACAF)

EverBank Field, Jacksonville
Attendance: 19,410
Referee: Ricardo Montero (Costa Rica)
6 September 2016
18:15 UTC−6

Guatemala	9–3	Saint Vincent and the Grenadines
Tinoco 13'; Ruiz 20', 27', 36', 57', 59'; Arreola 55'; Morales 78'; Márquez 83'	Report (FIFA); Report (CONCACAF)	Anderson 10', 29'; McBurnette 90'

Estadio Mateo Flores, Guatemala City
Attendance: 5,000
Referee: Kimbell Ward (Saint Kitts and Nevis)

== Goalscorers ==
There were 107 goals scored in 36 matches, for an average of 2.97 goals per match.

8 goals

- (Guatemala) Carlos Ruiz

6 goals

- (United States) Jozy Altidore

4 goals

- (Trinidad and Tobago) Joevin Jones

3 goals

- (Mexico) Jesús Corona
- (Saint Vincent and the Grenadines) Oalex Anderson

2 goals

- (Canada) Cyle Larin
- (Costa Rica) Christian Bolaños
- (Costa Rica) Bryan Ruiz
- (El Salvador) Nelson Bonilla
- (Guatemala) Rafael Morales
- (Guatemala) Gerson Tinoco
- (Honduras) Romell Quioto
- (Mexico) Andrés Guardado
- (Panama) Luis Tejada
- (Trinidad and Tobago) Trevin Caesar
- (Trinidad and Tobago) Levi García
- (Trinidad and Tobago) Kenwyne Jones
- (United States) Geoff Cameron
- (United States) Sacha Kljestan
- (United States) Christian Pulisic
- (United States) Bobby Wood

1 goal

- (Canada) David Edgar
- (Canada) Nikolas Ledgerwood
- (Canada) Manjrekar James
- (Costa Rica) Jhonny Acosta
- (Costa Rica) Randall Azofeifa
- (Costa Rica) Celso Borges
- (Costa Rica) Cristian Gamboa
- (Costa Rica) Rónald Matarrita
- (Costa Rica) Marco Ureña
- (Costa Rica) Johan Venegas
- (El Salvador) Alexander Larín
- (El Salvador) Pablo Punyed
- (Guatemala) Jairo Arreola
- (Guatemala) Stefano Cincotta
- (Guatemala) Dennis López
- (Guatemala) Minor López
- (Guatemala) Jean Márquez
- (Guatemala) Carlos Mejía
- (Haiti) Kevin Lafrance
- (Haiti) Duckens Nazon
- (Honduras) Alberth Elis
- (Honduras) Boniek García
- (Honduras) Anthony Lozano
- (Honduras) Mario Martínez
- (Jamaica) Clayton Donaldson
- (Jamaica) Je-Vaughn Watson
- (Mexico) Jürgen Damm
- (Mexico) Javier Hernández
- (Mexico) Héctor Herrera
- (Mexico) Raúl Jiménez
- (Mexico) Hirving Lozano
- (Mexico) Héctor Moreno
- (Mexico) Ángel Sepúlveda
- (Mexico) Carlos Vela
- (Panama) Abdiel Arroyo
- (Panama) Felipe Baloy
- (Panama) Armando Cooper
- (Panama) Gabriel Torres
- (Saint Vincent and the Grenadines) Nazir McBurnette
- (Saint Vincent and the Grenadines) Myron Samuel
- (Saint Vincent and the Grenadines) Shandel Samuel
- (Trinidad and Tobago) Sheldon Bateau
- (Trinidad and Tobago) Khaleem Hyland
- (Trinidad and Tobago) Kevin Molino
- (United States) Paul Arriola
- (United States) Matt Besler
- (United States) Clint Dempsey
- (United States) Fabian Johnson
- (United States) Gyasi Zardes
- (United States) Graham Zusi

1 own goal

- (Jamaica) Wes Morgan (against Panama)
