= Jairo Arreola =

Guatemalan footballer

Personal information
- Full name: Jairo Randolfo Arreola Silva
- Date of birth: 20 September 1985 (age 41)
- Place of birth: Villa Nueva, Guatemala
- Height: 1.74 m (5 ft 9 in)
- Position: Forward

Youth career
- 2005–2006: Comunicaciones

Senior career*
Years	Team	Apps	(Gls)
2005–2016	Comunicaciones	413	(75)
2017–2022	Antigua	193	(24)
2022	Guastatoya	14	(2)
2022–2023	Xinabajul	31	(2)
2023	San Pedro	4	(0)

International career
2007–2021	Guatemala	30	(1)
- * Club domestic league appearances and goals

Jairo Randolfo Arreola Silva (born 20 September 1985) is a Guatemalan former professional footballer who played as a forward.

== Club career ==
=== Comunicaciones ===
At the club level, Arreola began his career with Comunicaciones on 31 January 2005.

== International career ==
Arreola made his debut for Guatemala as a substitute on 9 June 2007 CONCACAF Gold Cup match against El Salvador. By June 2012, he had earned a total of eleven caps, scoring no goals. On 6 September 2016, Arreola scored his first goal in a 2018 FIFA World Cup qualification match against Saint Vincent and the Grenadines.

== Career statistics ==
=== International goals ===
Scores and results list Guatemala's goal tally first.

Goal	Date	Venue	Opponent	Score	Result	Competition
1.	6 September 2016	Estadio Mateo Flores, Guatemala City, Guatemala	Saint Vincent and the Grenadines	5–2	9–3	2018 FIFA World Cup qualification

== Honours ==
Comunicaciones

- Liga Nacional de Guatemala: Apertura 2009, Clausura 2011, Apertura 2011, Clausura 2013, Apertura 2013, Clausura 2014, Apertura 2014, Clausura 2015

Antigua

- Liga Nacional de Guatemala: Apertura 2018, Clausura 2019
