= Roxey Fer =

Surinamese footballer

Personal information
- Full name: Roxey Fer
- Date of birth: 15 November 1994 (age 31)
- Place of birth: Suriname
- Position: Midfielder

Team information
- Current team: S.V. Robinhood

Senior career*
Years	Team	Apps	(Gls)
2012–2014	SV Voorwaarts	?	(?)
2014–	S.V. Robinhood	?	(?)

International career^{‡}
2015–	Suriname	9	(1)
- * Club domestic league appearances and goals ‡ National team caps and goals as of 21:24, 26 February 2016 (UTC)

Roxey Fer (born 15 November 1994) is a Surinamese association footballer who currently plays for S.V. Robinhood and for the Suriname national football team.

== Career ==
Fer made his debut for Suriname in a friendly against Guyana as a 13th-minute substitute. His first goal for Suriname would come during 2018 FIFA World Cup qualification in a second leg 3-1 loss to Nicaragua who would go on to win 4-1 on aggregate. Fer was known for his aggressive behaviors on the pitch receiving many yellow and red cards.

=== International Goals ===
Scores and results list Suriname's goal tally first.

#	Date	Venue	Opponent	Score	Result	Competition
1	16 May 2015	André Kamperveen Stadion, Paramaribo, Suriname	Nicaragua	1-0	1-3	2018 FIFA World Cup qualification
2	25 February 2016	Stade de Baduel, Cayenne, French Guiana	French Guiana	1-0	3-2	Friendly

== Personal life ==
Roxey has a younger brother Donnegy Fer who played for rival club Transvaal and currently plays for Inter Moengotapoe.

== Honours ==
=== Club ===
Robinhood

- Eerste Divisie: 2017-2018
- Beker van Suriname: 2016, 2018
- President's Cup: 2016, 2018
- Caribbean Club Shield: 2019
