= Carlos Chavarría =

Nicaraguan footballer

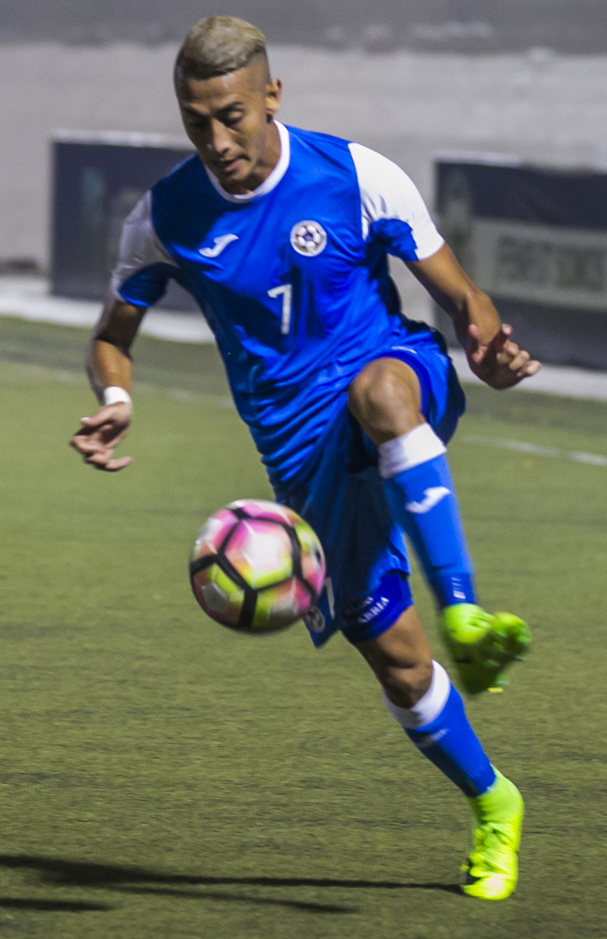
- Chavarría playing for Nicaragua in 2017

Personal information
- Full name: Carlos Alberto Chavarria Rodriguez
- Date of birth: 2 May 1994 (age 32)
- Place of birth: Estelí, Nicaragua
- Height: 1.73 m (5 ft 8 in)
- Position: Striker

Youth career
- 2010–2012: Real Estelí

Senior career*
| Years | Team | Apps | (Gls) |
| 2013–2016 | Real Estelí | 74 | (35) |
| 2016 | Alcobendas Sport | 7 | (0) |
| 2017–2018 | Real Estelí | 59 | (18) |
| 2018–2019 | Birkirkara | 11 | (1) |
| 2019–2020 | Shahr Khodro | 12 | (0) |
| 2020 | Club Africain | 4 | (0) |
| 2020 | Real Estelí | 7 | (1) |

International career^{‡}
| 2013 | Nicaragua U20 | 7 | (3) |
| 2013–2021 | Nicaragua | 40 | (11) |
- * Club domestic league appearances and goals ‡ National team caps and goals as of 8 June 2021 (UTC)

Carlos Alberto Chavarría Rodriguez (born 2 May 1994) is a Nicaraguan professional footballer. Chavarría has also represented Nicaragua internationally, both at U-20s and senior level.

== Career ==
Chavarría was promoted into the senior team of Real Estelí in 2013. To date he has won the Nicaraguan Primera División both seasons with the club. He has also played in the CONCACAF Champions League.

== International career ==
Chavarría made his international debut for Nicaragua in 2013 when he was called up to both the U-20s, and senior level teams. He made his debut for La Azul y Blanco during the 2013 Copa Centroamericana against Guatemala in a 1–1 draw.

His first goal for the senior team would come during Qualification for the 2018 FIFA World Cup when Chavarría netted the only goal in the first leg win over Suriname.

=== International goals ===
Scores and results list Nicaragua's goal tally first.

| # | Date | Venue | Opponent | Score | Result | Competition |
|---|---|---|---|---|---|---|
| 1. | 7 June 2015 | Nicaragua National Football Stadium, Managua, Nicaragua | Suriname | 1–0 | 1–0 | 2018 FIFA World Cup qualification |
| 2. | 16 June 2015 | André Kamperveen Stadion, Paramaribo, Suriname | Suriname | 3–1 | 3–1 | 2018 FIFA World Cup qualification |
| 3. | 5 September 2015 | Independence Park, Kingston, Jamaica | Jamaica | 2–0 | 3–2 | 2018 FIFA World Cup qualification |
| 4. | 24 March 2017 | Stade Sylvio Cator, Port-au-Prince, Haiti | Haiti | 1–3 | 1–3 | 2017 CONCACAF Gold Cup qualification |
| 5. | 7 June 2017 | Estadio Provincial de Yacuíba, Yacuíba, Bolivia | Bolivia | 2–0 | 2–3 | Friendly |
| 6. | 12 July 2017 | Raymond James Stadium, Tampa, United States | Panama | 1–0 | 1–2 | 2017 CONCACAF Gold Cup |
| 7. | 22 March 2018 | Nicaragua National Football Stadium, Managua, Nicaragua | Cuba | 1–1 | 3–1 | Friendly |
| 8. | 11 October 2019 | Nicaragua National Football Stadium, Managua, Nicaragua | Dominica | 1–0 | 3–1 | 2019–20 CONCACAF Nations League B |
| 9. | 11 October 2019 | Nicaragua National Football Stadium, Managua, Nicaragua | Dominica | 2–0 | 3–1 | 2019–20 CONCACAF Nations League B |
| 10. | 14 October 2019 | Windsor Park, Roseau, Dominica | Dominica | 3–1 | 3–1 | 2019–20 CONCACAF Nations League B |
| 11. | 10 October 2020 | Estadio Carlos Miranda, Comayagua, Honduras | Honduras | 1–0 | 1–1 | Friendly |

== Honours ==
Real Estelí

- Nicaraguan Primera División Champions: 2012–2013, 2013–2014, 2015–2016, 2016–2017.
