= Geremy Lombardi =

Footballer (born 1996)

Personal information
- Full name: Geremy Lombardi
- Date of birth: 4 April 1996 (age 30)
- Place of birth: San Juan de la Maguana, Dominican Republic
- Position: Forward

Team information
- Current team: Monza (on loan from Inter Milan)

Youth career
- 2011–2015: Inter Milan
- 2013–2015: → Parma (loan)

Senior career*
| Years | Team | Apps | (Gls) |
| 2015– | Inter Milan | 0 | (0) |
| 2015 | → Pro Piacenza (loan) | 6 | (0) |
| 2016– | → Monza (loan) | 8 | (0) |

International career^{‡}
| 2012 | Italy U16 | 5 | (1) |
| 2012 | Italy U17 | 6 | (0) |
| 2015– | Dominican Republic | 3 | (1) |
- * Club domestic league appearances and goals as of 14 June 2015 ‡ National team caps and goals as of 11 June 2015

Geremy Lombardi (born 4 April 1996) is a footballer who plays as a forward for Pro Piacenza. Born in Italy, he represents the Dominican Republic national team.

== Club career ==
Lombardi has played for the youth system of Inter Milan and Parma.

== International career ==
Lombardi was eligible for both Italy and Dominican Republic on senior international level due to being born to an Italian father and Dominican mother. He represented Italy at youth level. He made his international debut for Dominican Republic on 25 March 2015, as a starter in a 3–0 friendly lost against Cuba, being substituted at the 68th minute.

== Career statistics ==
Scores and results list Dominican Republic's goal tally first.

| # | Date | Venue | Opponent | Score | Result | Competition |
|---|---|---|---|---|---|---|
| 1 | 11 June 2015 | Estadio Olímpico Félix Sánchez, Santo Domingo, Dominican Republic | Belize | 1–1 | 1–2 | 2018 FIFA World Cup qualification |
