= Aaron Tumwa =

Antiguan footballer (born 1993)

Personal information
- Full name: Aaron Patrick Tumwa
- Date of birth: 27 September 1993 (age 33)
- Place of birth: Harrow, England
- Height: 1.79 m (5 ft 10 1/2 in)
- Position: Defender

Youth career
- –2012: Watford

Senior career*
Years	Team	Apps	(Gls)
2011–2013	Watford	0	(0)
2011–2012	→ Harrow Borough (loan)	4	(1)
2012–2013	→ Wealdstone (loan)	?	(?)
2013–2014	Blackburn Rovers	0	(0)
2014–2015	Farnborough	13	(0)
2015–2016	Bromley	5	(0)
2016	→ Hayes & Yeading United (loan)		
2016–2017	Margate	14	(0)
2016–2017	→ Hendon (loan)	?	(?)
2017	Bishop's Stortford	15	(0)

International career^{‡}
2014–	Antigua and Barbuda	8	(1)
- * Club domestic league appearances and goals as of 14:36, 14 March 2016 ‡ National team caps and goals as of 13:51, 21 June 2016 (UTC)

Aaron Patrick Tumwa (born 27 September 1993) is an Antiguan footballer who last played as a defender for Bishop's Stortford.

== Club career ==
Tumwa started his career at Watford, and in February 2012 was loaned to Isthmian Premier Division side Harrow Borough while still a second-year scholar. He signed a one-year professional deal in summer 2012 at the end of his two-year scholarship. The following season, he again spent time on loan in the Isthmian Premier Division, joining Wealdstone from the beginning of November 2012 to late January 2013. He was released by Watford in summer 2013 having not played a game for the first-team.

Tumwa subsequently joined another Championship club, Blackburn Rovers, in August 2013, joining their development team. He was released in May 2014 having not played a game for the first-team.

In August 2014 Tumwa signed for Conference South club Farnborough.

In July 2015 Tumwa signed for Conference National club Bromley. After making five league appearances, he joined Hayes & Yeading United on loan in March 2016.

In June 2016 he joined Margate.

== International career ==
Tumwa was one of five uncapped overseas based players who committed to represent the country in November 2014 for their matches in the group stages of the 2014 Caribbean Cup. He made his full international debut on 12 November 2014 in a match against Haiti.

=== International goals ===
Scores and results list Antigua and Barbuda's goal tally first.

Goal	Date	Venue	Opponent	Score	Result	Competition
1.	14 June 2015	Sir Vivian Richards Stadium, North Sound, Antigua and Barbuda	Saint Lucia	4–1	4–1	2018 FIFA World Cup
