= Alexander Larín =

Salvadoran footballer (born 1992)

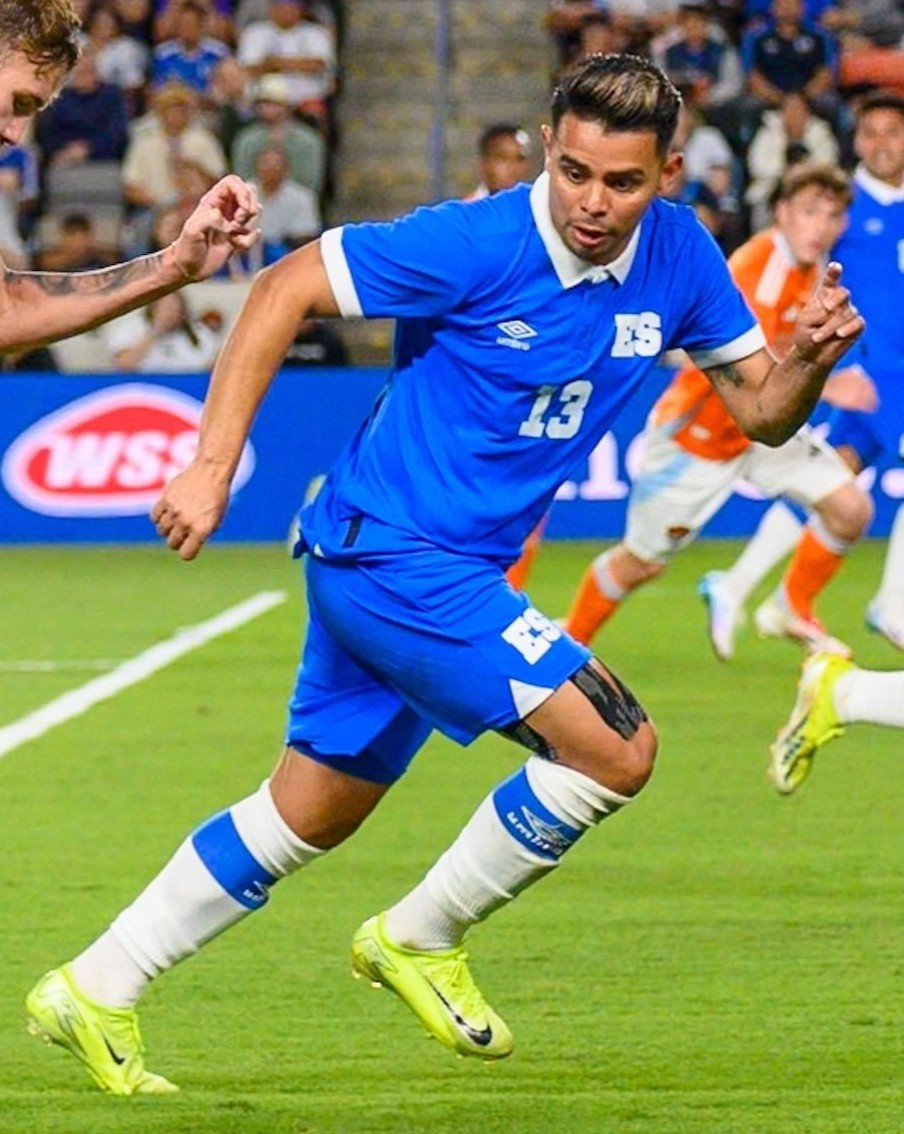
- Larín playing for El Salvador in 2025

Personal information
- Full name: Alexander Vidal Larín Hernández
- Date of birth: 27 June 1992 (age 34)
- Place of birth: San Salvador, El Salvador
- Height: 1.69 m (5 ft 7 in)
- Position: Left-back

Team information
- Current team: Hércules

Youth career
- 2005–2006: Turín FESA

Senior career*
Years	Team	Apps	(Gls)
2007–2008	Turín FESA		
2009	El Roble		
2010–2011	Atlético Marte	22	(4)
2012–2014	FAS	70	(20)
2014–2016	UANL	0	(0)
2014–2015	→ Herediano (loan)	32	(1)
2015	→ Juárez (loan)	10	(1)
2016	→ FAS (loan)	15	(6)
2016–2018	Alianza	98	(16)
2018–2019	Comunicaciones	3	(0)
2019–2020	Alianza	30	(3)
2020	Isidro Metapán	9	(2)
2021	Xelajú	12	(1)
2021–2022	Comunicaciones	69	(4)
2023	Alianza	18	(3)
2023–2025	Águila	71	(3)
2025-	Hércules	0	(0)

International career^{‡}
2011	El Salvador U-20	4	(2)
2012	El Salvador U-23	5	(0)
2012–	El Salvador	84	(7)
- * Club domestic league appearances and goals as of 20:39, 9 December 2024 (UTC) ‡ National team caps and goals as of 20:39, 9 December 2024 (UTC)

Alexander Vidal Larín Hernández (born 27 June 1992) is a Salvadoran professional footballer who plays as a left-back for Primera División club Águila and the El Salvador national team.

== Club career ==
=== Early career in El Salvador ===
Larín began his career in the reserve side of Turín FESA before joining Second Division El Roble de Ilobasco.

Larín went on to play in the First Division with Atlético Marte for a season.

In 2011, he joined to FAS for 3 years, where he scored 20 goals in 69 appearances. During his time with FAS, the team were runners-up twice in the Primera División; in the 2012/2013 Clausura and the 2013/2014 Apertura.

=== Herediano ===
On 16 June 2014, Larín signed a three-year deal with Liga MX club Tigres UANL for an undisclosed fee, and immediately went to loan with Costa Rican club Herediano for six months. He made his debut for Herediano in the 2014–15 CONCACAF Champions League group stage on 21 August 2014 against Isidro Metapán, where he assisted Víctor Núñez's goal to achieve a 4–0 victory.

=== Tigres UANL ===
On 2 June 2015, Larín returned to Tigres after his loan with Herediano ended.

== Career statistics ==
Scores and results list El Salvador's goal tally first.

No.	Date	Venue	Opponent	Score	Result	Competition
1.	30 August 2014	Estadio Cuscatlán, San Salvador, El Salvador	Dominican Republic	1–0	2–0	Friendly
2.	14 November 2014	Estadio Cuscatlán, San Salvador, El Salvador	Panama	1–2	1–3	Friendly
3.	4 September 2015	Ergilio Hato Stadium, Willemstad, Curaçao	Curaçao	1–0	1–0	2018 FIFA World Cup qualification
4.	2 September 2016	Estadio Cuscatlán, San Salvador, El Salvador	Mexico	1–0	1–3	2018 FIFA World Cup qualification
5.	7 June 2022	Kirani James Athletic Stadium, St. George's, Grenada	Grenada	1–1	2–2	2022–23 CONCACAF Nations League A
6.	14 June 2022	Estadio Cuscatlán, San Salvador, El Salvador	United States	1–0	1–1	2022–23 CONCACAF Nations League A
7.	27 September 2022	Audi Field, Washington, D.C., United States	Peru	1–1	1–4	Friendly

== Honours ==
Herediano

- Primera División de Costa Rica: 2015 Verano

FC Juárez

- Ascenso MX: Apertura 2015

Alianza F.C.

- TBD: Apertura 2017, Clausura 2018

Comunicaciones

- CONCACAF League: 2021
- Liga Nacional de Guatemala: Clausura 2022
