= Deniz Bozkurt =

Puerto Rican footballer (born 1993)

Personal information
- Full name: Deniz Manuel Bozkurt
- Date of birth: July 27, 1993 (age 33)
- Place of birth: Plantation, Florida, U.S.
- Height: 1.78 m (5 ft 10 in)
- Position: Midfielder

College career
Years	Team	Apps	(Gls)
2011–2014	Florida Atlantic Owls	49	(8)

Senior career*
Years	Team	Apps	(Gls)
2014	Floridians FC	7	(1)
2018	Bayamón FC		
2019–20??	Boca Raton FC		

International career^{‡}
2013	Puerto Rico U20	5	(0)
2015–20??	Puerto Rico	3	(1)
- * Club domestic league appearances and goals ‡ National team caps and goals as of 14 March 2019

Deniz Manuel Bozkurt (born July 23, 1993) is a former footballer who last played as a midfielder for Boca Raton FC. Born in the mainland United States, he played for the Puerto Rico national team.

== Career ==
Bozkurt started his career in the United States' college system with the Florida Atlantic Owls where he stood out as a player, scoring 6 goals in 37 appearances over 3 seasons, earning him a call up to the Puerto Rico U20s for the 2013 CONCACAF U-20 Championship. In early 2015 he traveled to Germany for a trial with VfL Wolfsburg.

== International career ==
Bozkurt was called up to the Puerto Rico U20s in 2012 whilst playing for Florida Atlantic Owls for the 2013 CONCACAF U-20 Championship qualifying match against Barbados U20s. He received his first full national cap for Puerto Rico in 2015 in a friendly against Canada as a substitute in the 36th minute.

His first goal for Puerto Rico came during second round qualifications for the 2018 FIFA World Cup in a first-leg tie over Grenada in which Bozkurt's goal gave the Puerto Ricans a 1-0 victory.

== Career statistics ==
=== International ===
Appearances and goals by national team and year
National team	Year	Apps	Goals
Puerto Rico	2015	4	1
Total		4	1

Scores and results list Puerto Rico's goal tally first, score column indicates score after each Bozkurt goal.

List of international goals scored by Deniz Bozkurt
No.	Date	Venue	Opponent	Score	Result	Competition
1	12 June 2015	Juan Ramón Loubriel Stadium, Bayamón, Puerto Rico	Grenada	1–0	1–0	2018 FIFA World Cup qualification
