= Brandon Beresford =

American-Guyanese footballer (born 1992)

Personal information
- Date of birth: July 15, 1992 (age 34)
- Place of birth: Loma Linda, California, U.S.
- Height: 1.86 m (6 ft 1 in)
- Position: Midfielder

College career
Years	Team	Apps	(Gls)
2010–2013	Graceland Yellowjackets	61	(14)

Senior career*
Years	Team	Apps	(Gls)
2012	Des Moines Menace	2	(0)
2013	Forest City London	13	(0)
2014	Michigan Bucks	11	(0)
2015	FC Tucson	3	(0)
2015	Slingerz FC		
2016–2017	Rochester Rhinos	27	(0)
2018	Peachtree City MOBA	8	(0)
2018–2019	1º Dezembro		
2019	Peachtree City MOBA	6	(0)

International career
2010–2019	Guyana	25	(3)
- * Club domestic league appearances and goals as of 14 May 2021

Brandon Beresford (born July 15, 1992) is a professional footballer who plays as a midfielder.

Born in the United States, he represents Guyana at international level.

== Club career ==
Beresford has played college soccer for the Graceland Yellowjackets, and at senior level for Des Moines Menace, Forest City London, Michigan Bucks, FC Tucson, Slingerz FC, Rochester Rhinos, and Peachtree City MOBA.

== International career ==
Despite being born in the United States, Beresford was eligible to represent Guyana at international level, and made his senior debut for them on 17 November 2010.

== Career statistics ==
=== International ===
Appearances and goals by national team and year
National team	Year	Apps	Goals
Guyana	2010	1	0
Guyana	2011	3	0
Guyana	2012	5	1
Guyana	2013	–	
Guyana	2014	–	
Guyana	2015	3	1
Guyana	2016	5	1
Guyana	2017	4	0
Guyana	2018	1	0
Guyana	2019	3	0
Total		25	3

Scores and results list Guyana's goal tally first, score column indicates score after each Beresford goal.

List of international goals scored by Aung Kyaw Moe
No.	Date	Venue	Opponent	Score	Result	Competition
1	22 March 2012	Stade Municipal Dr. Edmard Lama, Remire-Montjoly, French Guiana	French Guiana	2–0	2–0	Friendly
2	10 June 2015	Arnos Vale Stadium, Kingstown, Saint Vincent and the Grenadines	Saint Vincent and the Grenadines	1–0	2–2	2018 FIFA World Cup qualification
3	1 June 2016	Ergilio Hato Stadium, Willemstad, Curaçao	Curaçao	2–4	2–5	2017 Caribbean Cup qualification
