= Dennis López =

Honduran-born Guatemalan footballer

Personal information
- Full name: Dennis Elías López Beklels
- Date of birth: 2 January 1986 (age 40)
- Place of birth: Trujillo, Honduras
- Position: Centre back

Senior career*
Years	Team	Apps	(Gls)
2011–2012	Deportivo Petapa	16	(0)
2012–2013	Marquense	42	(2)
2013–2018	Municipal	207	(6)
2019	Deportivo Iztapa	19	(2)

International career^{‡}
2014–	Guatemala	15	(2)
- * Club domestic league appearances and goals as of 14:24, 8 October 2019 (UTC) ‡ National team caps and goals as of 18:57, 1 February 2017 (UTC)

Dennis Elías López Beklels (born 2 January 1986) is a Guatemalan international footballer.

== Early life ==
He was born in Trujillo, Honduras, and was a teacher.

== Club career ==
He had previously played for Deportes Savio, Deportivo Petapa, Deportivo Mixco and Deportivo Marquense before signing with C.S.D. Municipal in June 2013.

== International career ==
=== International goals ===
Scores and results list Guatemala's goal tally first.

No	Date	Venue	Opponent	Score	Result	Competition
1.	8 September 2015	Estadio Mateo Flores, Guatemala City, Guatemala	Antigua and Barbuda	2–0	2–0	2018 FIFA World Cup qualification
2.	17 November 2016	Arnos Vale Stadium, Kingstown, Saint Vincent and the Grenadines	Saint Vincent and the Grenadines	3–0	4–0	2018 FIFA World Cup qualification

== Honours ==
Municipal

Runner-up

- Liga Nacional de Fútbol de Guatemala (2): 2013–14 Clausura, 2014–15
