= Stefano Cincotta =

Guatemalan footballer (born 1991)

Personal information
- Full name: Stefano Cincotta Giordano
- Date of birth: 28 February 1991 (age 35)
- Place of birth: Guatemala City, Guatemala
- Height: 1.77 m (5 ft 10 in)
- Position: Left-back

Youth career
- –2010: Eintracht Frankfurt

Senior career*
Years	Team	Apps	(Gls)
2010–2012	Kickers Offenbach	28	(2)
2012–2013	Lugano	14	(0)
2013–2014	Wacker Burghausen	23	(0)
2014–2017	Chemnitzer FC	64	(4)
2017–2018	SV Elversberg	14	(1)
2018–2019	Guastatoya	20	(2)
2019	Comunicaciones	9	(1)
2020	Cobán Imperial	4	(0)
Total		176	(10)

International career
2008–2009	Germany U17	5	(1)
2009–2010	Germany U19	5	(1)
2010–2011	Germany U20	9	(0)
2015–2019	Guatemala	17	(3)
- * Club domestic league appearances and goals

Stefano Cincotta Giordano (born 28 February 1991) is a Guatemalan former professional footballer who played as a left-back.

== Club career ==
=== Guastatoya ===
In September 2018, after featuring sparingly, Cincotta left fourth-tier side SV Elversberg to return to his country of birth Guatemala, joining Guastatoya.

=== Comunicaciones ===
Ahead of the following 2019–20 season, Cincotta joined Comunicaciones on a one-year contract.

=== Cobán Imperial ===
In January 2020, Cincotta moved to Cobán Imperial. However, his contract was terminated by mutual agreement on 13 March 2020 because his parents, who was living in Germany, were concerned due to the COVID-19 pandemic. A few weeks later, Cincotta revealed that he wanted to return to Europe because he had suffered from a lot of injuries since his return to Guatemala. This was also one of the reasons why he terminated his contract with Cobán Imperial.

Cincotta announced his retirement from playing in January 2021.

== International career ==
Cincotta's parents met in Frankfurt, Germany. His father is Italian, while his mother (Alma Giordano) is a Guatemalan with a partial Italian descent. They went to Guatemala, where Cincotta was born. They returned to Germany shortly after, where he grew up. As a result, Cincotta was eligible to play for the national teams of Guatemala, Italy and Germany. After representing Germany at youth level, Cincotta expressed his desire to play for Guatemala at senior level.

=== International goals ===
Scores and results list Guatemala's goal tally first, score column indicates score after each Cincotta goal.

List of international goals scored by Stefano Cincotta
No.	Date	Venue	Opponent	Score	Result	Competition
1	15 June 2015	Bermuda National Stadium, Hamilton, Bermuda	Bermuda	1–0	1–0	2018 FIFA World Cup qualification
2	17 November 2015	Arnos Vale Stadium, Kingstown, Saint Vincent and the Grenadines	Saint Vincent and the Grenadines	1–0	4–0	2018 FIFA World Cup qualification
3	22 March 2019	Estadio Doroteo Guamuch Flores, Guatemala City, Guatemala	Costa Rica	1–0	1–0	Friendly

== Honours ==
Guastatoya

- Liga Nacional de Guatemala: Apertura 2018
