= Manuel Rosas (footballer, born 1983) =

Footballer (born 1983)

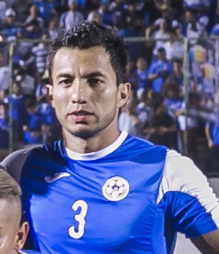
- Rosas with Nicaragua in March 2017

Personal information
- Full name: Manuel Rosas Arreola
- Date of birth: 14 October 1983 (age 43)
- Place of birth: Guadalajara, Jalisco, Mexico
- Height: 1.76 m (5 ft 9 in)
- Positions: Left back; midfielder

Youth career
- UANL

Senior career*
Years	Team	Apps	(Gls)
- Morelia
- Alacranes Rojos
2005	Tigrillos Broncos	5	(0)
2010–2022	Real Estelí	237	(20)

International career^{‡}
2013–2022	Nicaragua	51	(3)
- * Club domestic league appearances and goals ‡ National team caps and goals as of 24 June 2019

Manuel Rosas Arreola (born 14 October 1983) is a former professional footballer who played as a left back.

Born and raised in Mexico to Mexican parents, Rosas has played for Real Estelí in the Nicaraguan league and subsequently capped for the Nicaragua national team.

== International career ==
Having arrived to Nicaragua in April 2010 to play for Real Estelí, Rosas became a naturalized citizen in January 2013. According La Prensa, he did not comply with the Nationality Law No. 149 at the moment of his naturalization. By debuting for Nicaragua that very 2013, he also failed with the FIFA eligibility rules.

=== International goals ===
Scores and results list Nicaragua's goal tally first.

No	Date	Venue	Opponent	Score	Result	Competition
1.	16 June 2015	André Kamperveen Stadion, Paramaribo, Suriname	Suriname	2–1	3–1	2018 FIFA World Cup qualification
2.	4 September 2015	Independence Park, Kingston, Jamaica	Jamaica	1–0	3–2	2018 FIFA World Cup qualification
