= Joan Morales =

Puerto Rican footballer (born 1988)

Personal information
- Full name: Joan Morales Feliciano
- Date of birth: 8 December 1988 (age 37)
- Place of birth: Santurce, Puerto Rico
- Position: Defender

Team information
- Current team: Sevilla PR

Senior career*
Years	Team	Apps	(Gls)
2010	Bayamón		
2011–	Sevilla PR		

International career^{‡}
2010–	Puerto Rico	5	(0)
- * Club domestic league appearances and goals as of 25 June 2011 ‡ National team caps and goals as of 25 June 2011

Joan Morales Feliciano (born 8 December 1988) is a Puerto Rican international footballer who plays for Sevilla PR, as a defender.

== Career ==
Morales has played club football for Bayamón and Sevilla PR.

He made his international debut for Puerto Rico in 2010.
