= Carlos Ruiz (Guatemalan footballer) =

Guatemalan footballer (born 1979)

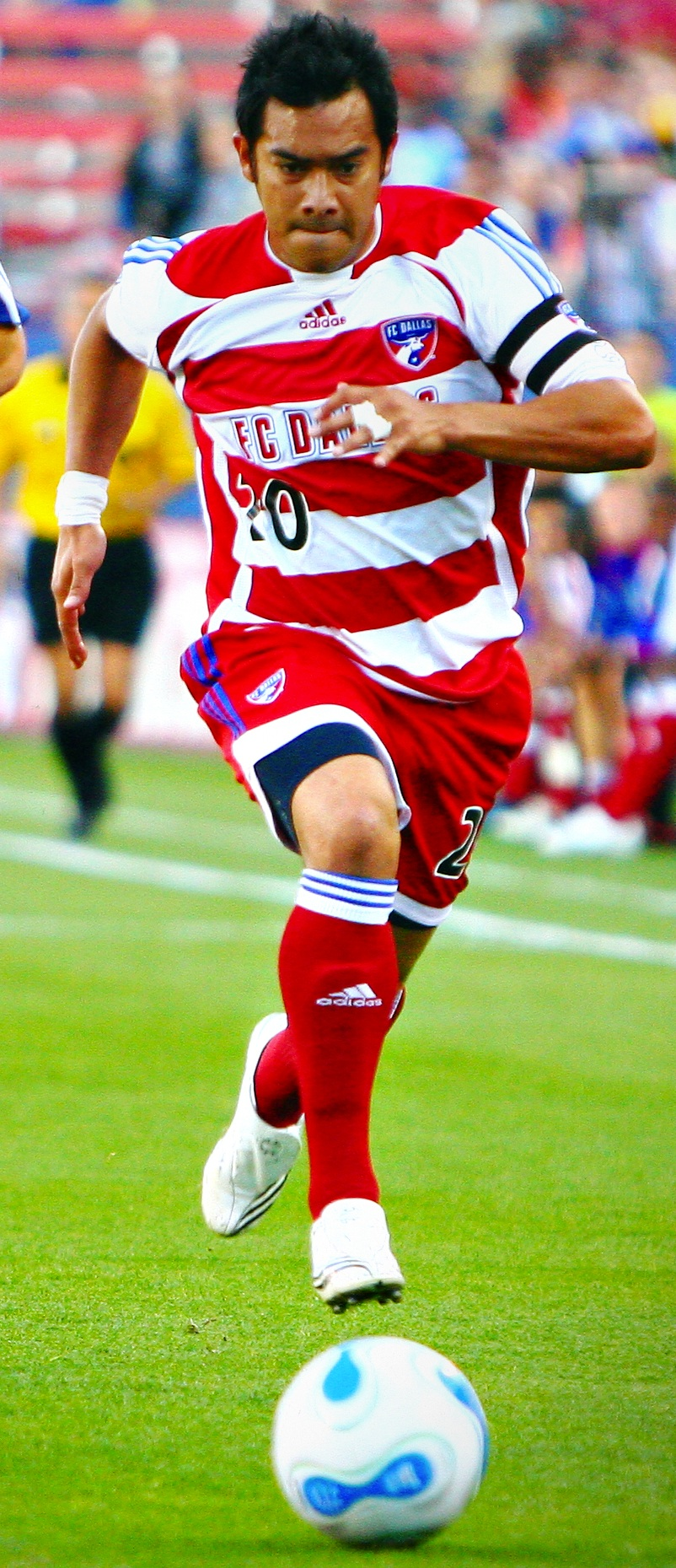
- Ruiz playing for FC Dallas in 2007

Personal information
- Full name: Carlos Humberto Ruíz Gutiérrez
- Date of birth: 15 September 1979 (age 47)
- Place of birth: Guatemala City, Guatemala
- Height: 1.75 m (5 ft 9 in)
- Position: Striker

Youth career
- 1991–1995: Municipal

Senior career*
Years	Team	Apps	(Gls)
1995–2002	Municipal	143	(69)
2001	→ PAS Giannina (loan)	4	(0)
2002–2004	LA Galaxy	72	(50)
2005–2007	FC Dallas	68	(31)
2008	LA Galaxy	10	(1)
2008	Toronto FC	5	(0)
2009	Olimpia	18	(10)
2009–2010	Puebla	33	(9)
2010–2011	Aris	16	(4)
2011	Philadelphia Union	14	(6)
2011–2012	Veracruz	23	(10)
2013	D.C. United	13	(0)
2014–2016	Municipal	86	(72)
2016	FC Dallas	3	(1)
Total		506	(234)

International career
1998–2016	Guatemala	133	(68)
2000	Guatemala (futsal)	4	(1)
- * Club domestic league appearances and goals

Carlos Humberto Ruiz Gutiérrez (born 15 September 1979), initially nicknamed El Pescadito or "The Little Fish" but later became El Pescado or "The Fish" (even by Spanish-speakers), is a Guatemalan former professional footballer who played as a striker. A product of CSD Municipal's youth academy, Ruiz played for five MLS clubs (Los Angeles Galaxy, FC Dallas, Toronto FC, Philadelphia Union, and D.C. United), scoring 88 goals in 182 MLS regular-season matches and 16 goals in the post-season, which is the second most post-season goals in MLS history. In 2002, he was named the MLS's Most Valuable Player of the season.

He was a member of the Guatemalan national team from 1998 to 2016. He is regarded to be the greatest Guatemalan footballer of all time. He served as captain, is the player with the most caps and is the all-time top scorer of the Guatemala national team. He played in five World Cup qualification phases and in September 2016, he became the all-time top scorer in World Cup qualification with 39 goals, although his country never qualified for the tournament.

In 2019, Ruiz worked for a television channel in Miami.

== Club career ==
=== Early career (1995–2002) ===
Ruiz, born in Guatemala City, Guatemala, started his footballing career in local club San Carlos. At the age of 12, he joined the youth divisions of Club Social y Deportivo CSD Municipal, and at 16, he made his professional debut. He became a starter for Municipal and a young star in the Guatemalan league until 2000, when he traveled to Europe to play for a short time alongside compatriot Guillermo Ramírez at Greek club PAS Giannina. After a stint with PAS, he returned to Municipal.

=== LA Galaxy (2002–2005) ===
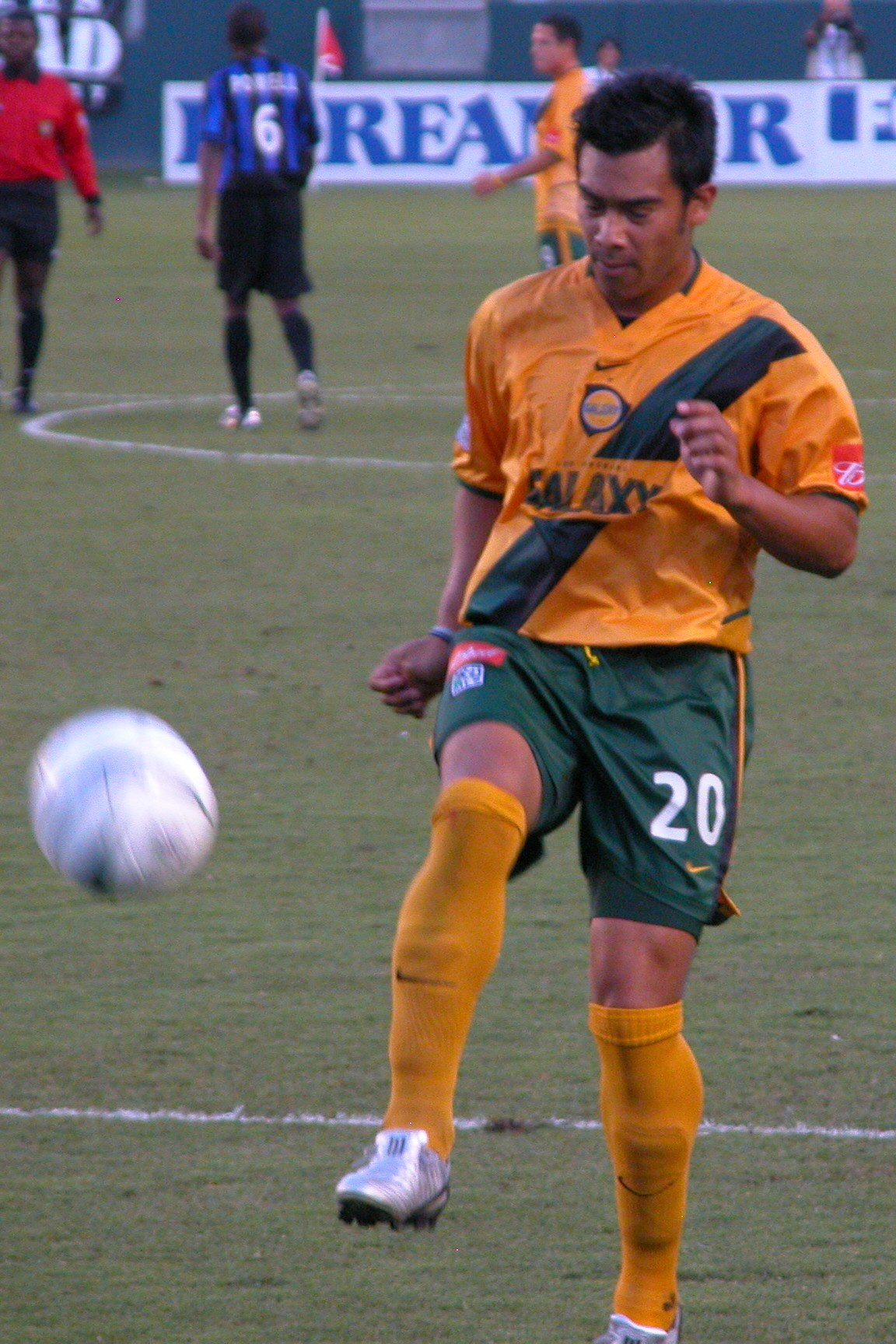
Ruiz playing for the Los Angeles Galaxy.

In January 2002, Ruiz signed with the Los Angeles Galaxy. He was initially skeptical, telling The New York Times, "I didn't know anything about MLS or soccer in the U.S. Everything we hear about Major League Soccer is not so good ... we hear that all the players come here to finish their careers." However, he found the level to be better than he imagined, saying: "In the beginning, I was not happy to come here. But after a couple of games and when I see the level of soccer here, I was excited to play here." Once in MLS, Ruiz shone immediately. In his debut season in 2002, Ruiz scored 24 goals (winning the MLS Golden Boot), leading the Galaxy to the MLS Cup by scoring the 2nd golden goal in MLS Cup history, a year after Dwayne de Rosario was the first to accomplish the feat in 2001. He was named the MLS Most Valuable Player that year. In the playoffs, he scored eight goals and added two assists, totaling 18 points and setting an MLS record for goals and points in a single postseason. Ruiz' overtime goal in extra time of MLS Cup 2002 gave Galaxy the title.

In his second season, Ruiz cooled off significantly, but the forward still finished the season tied with Taylor Twellman for the league lead in goals with 15. He continued to statistically drop in 2004, scoring 11 goals. Ruiz had trials at English side Wolverhampton Wanderers in the 2003–04 season.

=== FC Dallas (2005–2007) ===
In 2005, when Landon Donovan expressed his desire to return to MLS, the Galaxy traded Ruiz to FC Dallas for the #1 allocation in the MLS pecking order, so that they could acquire Donovan. Ruiz finished his first year in Dallas with 11 goals and two assists. During the postseason in the conference semifinals, Ruiz scored two goals in the second leg match against the Colorado Rapids, but FC Dallas were eliminated on penalty kicks. In February 2006, MLS fully bought Ruiz's contract rights from his former club, Municipal, and FC Dallas was able to negotiate a multi-year deal. In March 2006, a bicycle kick goal he scored against D.C. United was selected as the "Goal of the Decade" in MLS through online voting.

During a 2007 game against the Houston Dynamo, Ruiz was involved in a controversial incident with Houston midfielder Ricardo Clark. Following a corner kick in which the two players became entangled, Clark violently kicked Ruiz in the upper body as he lay on the pitch hoping to draw a foul. Ruiz then hit Clark's back with his knee during the subsequent play, and both players were sent off, with Clark also receiving the longest suspension in league history.

Following the conclusion of the 2007 season, Ruiz appeared to be unwilling to return to Dallas and to be holding out for a move back to the Galaxy. Earlier attempts to produce a trade faltered due to Ruiz being a grandfathered Designated Player, with the Galaxy already having other players in the same situation (Landon Donovan and David Beckham). In January 2008, FC Dallas traded Ruiz to the Galaxy for an undisclosed cash allocation and the Galaxy's natural second-round pick in the following year's MLS SuperDraft. At his departure, he said, "I did everything I could to win a championship with Dallas. Unfortunately, it did not happen."

==== Return to LA Galaxy and trade to Toronto FC (2008) ====
He spoke about the Galaxy to ESPN analyst Andrea Canales: "I still think the Galaxy is the best team in the U.S. They're the best organization. The Galaxy have always had famous players. They continue to be a team that people always follow," and added his personal relief to be on the Galaxy team, "I'm so glad I came to the Galaxy and not another team, because I would have felt like I was starting over." In the season opener, however, Ruiz suffered a knee injury and was unable to play for over a month. While Ruiz was injured, the Galaxy found unexpected striking potential in Edson Buddle, and even after coming back from the injury, Ruiz was notably still left off the travel roster for a high-profile game against D.C. United. He scored his first goal of the 2008 season on 19 July in a game against New York Red Bulls.

Ruiz was traded on 19 August 2008 to Toronto FC who in-turn released Laurent Robert to make room for Ruiz. He was expected to help solve TFC's goal scoring woes as he had scored 82 goals in MLS at that point in his career, but he managed only five first team games in Toronto, during which he scored no goals. He was released by Toronto in early 2009 after they signed Dwayne De Rosario.

=== Olimpia (2009) ===
On 31 January 2009, Ruiz signed a contract with Paraguayan club Olimpia Asunción under the request of then-coach Ever Hugo Almeida. Ruiz and his compatriot Carlos Figueroa joined the club together. Both of the players were coached by Ever Hugo Almeida at CSD Municipal between 2001 and 2003. Ruiz joined Olimpia Asunción on a non-contract, but on the promise of signing a contract. Amongst Ruiz' most remembered goals, came in a 2–0 victory in the Paraguayan superclasico against Cerro Porteño and a free kick against 3 de Febrero. He also scored a hat trick against Rubio Ñu in a 5–3 victory for Olimpia. In total, Ruiz scored 10 goals in 18 appearances, becoming the team's leading goal scorer and the third leading goal scorer in the 2009 Torneo Apertura. Ruiz finished with Olimpia Asunción in June 2009. Ruiz departed the club before the 2009 Torneo Apertura finished. The decision of leaving Olimpia was because of the circumstances and was not his, as the club experienced it's worse administrative moment. Since departing Olimpia, Ruiz became friends with Denis Caniza, Mario Jara and Juan Lucero and remained in contact with them.

=== Puebla (2009–2010) ===
Ruiz signed with Puebla on 30 June 2009 under head coach José Luis Sánchez Solá. On 25 July 2009, in a game against Tigres, he scored his first goal for Puebla on a penalty kick. He wore number 20, which is the same number he previously wore for LA Galaxy, FC Dallas, and the Guatemala national team.

=== Aris FC (2010 ===
Ruiz agreed to join Aris FC on 12 July 2010. He made his debut on 18 August 2010 in the playoff round of the Europa League against Austria Wien, becoming the first Guatemalan footballer ever to appear in a UEFA competition match. The first leg was played in Thessaloniki with Ruiz netting on his debut to give Aris a 1–0 victory. In the second leg played in Vienna, Ruiz scored again in a 1–1 draw, giving Aris a 2–1 aggregate victory and sending them through to the group stage, where he scored one more goal against Rosenborg.

=== Philadelphia Union (2011) ===
After trialling with the club during the 2011 MLS pre-season, Ruiz signed with the Philadelphia Union on 22 February 2011. On 26 March he scored Philadelphia's winning goal in the home opener of the 2011 MLS season against the Vancouver Whitecaps FC. Ruiz also scored the "MLS Goal of the Week" in Week 10 of the season with a game-winning 35 yard strike against the Chicago Fire.

=== Veracruz (2011) ===
On 3 August 2011, Ruíz was transferred to Tiburones Rojos de Veracruz. He scored his first goal for the club against Correcaminos during the 4th week of the 2011 Apertura tournament and finished the year with six goals in five matches. Ruiz remained a part of the club until 2013, though he was inactive for nearly a year.

=== D.C. United (2013) ===
On 31 January 2013, Municipal announced that Ruiz would be rejoining the club. However, this move was cancelled after Veracruz refused to terminate Ruiz's contract. On 20 February 2013, DC United announced that the club had signed Ruiz via the MLS allocation process to a one-year deal. On 30 October 2013, DC United announced that they had declined the contract option on Ruiz.

=== Return to Guatemala (2014) ===
On 8 February 2014, Municipal announced that Ruiz would be rejoining the club. He signed an 18-month contract that made him the highest paid footballer ever in Central America.

=== Return to FC Dallas (2016) ===
On 15 September 2016, FC Dallas announced that they had signed Ruiz for a second stint with the club.

== International career ==
Overall, Ruiz earned 133 caps and scored 68 goals for his country. He played in World Cup qualification campaigns for the FIFA World Cups of 2002, 2006, 2010, 2014, and 2018. He played his first international match on 11 November 1998, a friendly against Mexico, and scored his first goal against El Salvador at the 1999 UNCAF Nations Cup. Ruiz represented Guatemala at the 1999 Pan American Games. In 2000, as the Guatemala national futsal team had begun its development, Ruiz was selected, along with other 11-a-side football players, as part of the squad that competed at the 2000 Futsal World Championship, hosted by Guatemala. He scored one goal in the tournament.

After scoring eight goals in nine matches during the 2002 World Cup qualification campaign and already having a successful career in the MLS, Ruiz was the focal point of the Guatemalan team in qualifying for the 2006 FIFA World Cup, leading the team in scoring as they reached the final stage of the CONCACAF region. However, they would not qualify for the World Cup.

On 14 June 2008, Ruiz broke Juan Carlos Plata's all-time individual goal-scoring record for Guatemala by scoring four goals against Saint Lucia in Guatemala's 2010 World Cup qualification opening match. Ruiz had scored 39 goals, four more than Plata's total. Ruiz also became the first Guatemalan player to score four goals in a World Cup qualification match. On 10 September 2008, Ruiz scored two goals against Cuba in Guatemala's 2010 World Cup qualification in the 3rd match of the 3rd round of qualification of the CONCACAF region. Those two goals extended his all-time individual scoring record for Guatemala to 41 goals, six more than Plata's total.

On 9 February 2009, Ruiz announced his retirement from international football. However, on 4 January 2011, he stated that he was returning to international football, making the UNCAF 2011 championship to be held in Panama his first international tournament in two years. He then participated in the 2011 CONCACAF Gold Cup, scoring one goal against Grenada in the first round and another one against Mexico in the quarterfinals in a 2–1 defeat.

On 16 October 2012, Ruiz again announced his retirement from international competition after a 3–1 loss to the United States at Livestrong Sporting Park, which eliminated Guatemala from 2014 World Cup qualification. However, he would return to play for Guatemala again and became the second Guatemalan player to appear in five World Cup qualification processes (Juan Manuel Funes being the first) when he started in the second round of the 2018 World Cup qualification in their opening match against Bermuda.

On 6 September 2016, Ruiz scored 5 goals against Saint Vincent and the Grenadines in his final farewell match for Guatemala. This gave him a total of 39 goals in 47 qualifying games and made him the highest goalscorer of all-time, from any country, in FIFA World Cup qualification history. Those 39 goals came against 14 different countries. They include five against each of Costa Rica, Antigua and Barbuda, and Saint Vincent and the Grenadines. This result remained until October 14, 2025, when Portuguese top scorer Cristiano Ronaldo scored 41 goals and surpassed Ruiz's achievement.

Ruiz is the most prolific goal-scorer in the history of the Guatemalan national team with 68 goals in 133 matches.

== Career statistics ==
=== Club ===
Appearances and goals by club, season and competition
Club	Season	League		National cup and play-offs		International		Total	
Club	Season	Apps	Goals	Apps	Goals	Apps	Goals	Apps	Goals
LA Galaxy	2002	26	24	6	8	—	—	32	32
LA Galaxy	2003	26	15	2	2	—	—	28	17
LA Galaxy	2004	20	11	3	1	—	—	23	12
LA Galaxy	Total	72	50	11	11	—	—	83	61
FC Dallas	2005	19	11	2	2	—	—	21	13
FC Dallas	2006	27	13	2	2	—	—	29	15
FC Dallas	2007	22	7	2	1	—	—	24	8
FC Dallas	Total	68	31	6	5	—	—	74	36
LA Galaxy	2008	10	1	—	—	—	—	10	1
Toronto	2008	5	0	—	—	—	—	5	0
Olimpia	2009	18	10	—	—	—	—	18	10
Puebla	2009–10	33	9	4	2	—	—	37	11
Aris	2010–11	16	1	1	0	8	3	25	4
Philadelphia Union	2011	14	6	—	—	—	—	14	6
Veracruz	2011–12	23	10	—	—	—	—	23	10
D.C. United	2013	13	0	1	0	—	—	14	0
Municipal	2013–14	13	8	—	—	—	—	13	9
Municipal	2014–15	44	25	—	—	3	3	44	25
Municipal	2015–16	11	6	—	—	3	1	14	7
Municipal	Total	70	40	—	—	6	4	76	44
FC Dallas	2016	1	1	2	0	—	—	3	1
Career total		343	159	23	18	14	7	396	184

=== International ===
Appearances and goals by national team and year
National team	Year	Apps	Goals
Guatemala	1998	1	0
Guatemala	1999	13	1
Guatemala	2000	10	7
Guatemala	2001	1	2
Guatemala	2002	6	2
Guatemala	2003	9	4
Guatemala	2004	11	9
Guatemala	2005	13	8
Guatemala	2006	4	1
Guatemala	2007	7	1
Guatemala	2008	8	6
Guatemala	2011	9	4
Guatemala	2012	12	10
Guatemala	2014	6	2
Guatemala	2015	16	2
Guatemala	2016	7	9
Total		133	68

Scores and results list Guatemala's goal tally first, score column indicates score after each Ruiz goal.

List of international goals scored by Carlos Ruiz
No.	Date	Venue	Opponent	Score	Result	Competition	Ref.
1	19 March 1999	Estadio Nacional, San José, Costa Rica	El Salvador	1–1	1–1	1999 UNCAF Nations Cup	
2	17 June 2000	Estadio Doroteo Guamuch Flores, Guatemala City, Guatemala	Antigua and Barbuda	2–0	8–1	2002 FIFA World Cup qualification	
3	3 July 2000	Montreal, Canada	Haiti	–	4–1	Friendly	
4	16 July 2000	Estadio Carlos Salazar Hijo, Mazatenango, Guatemala	United States	1–1	1–1	2002 FIFA World Cup qualification	
5	22 July 2000	Estadio Mario Camposeco, Quetzaltenango, Guatemala	Barbados	1–0	2–0	2002 FIFA World Cup qualification	
6	8 October 2000	Barbados National Stadium, Waterford, Barbados	Barbados	2–0	3–1	2002 FIFA World Cup qualification	
7	15 November 2000	Estadio Carlos Salazar Hijo, Mazatenango, Guatemala	Costa Rica	1–0	2–1	2002 FIFA World Cup qualification	
8	15 November 2000	Estadio Carlos Salazar Hijo, Mazatenango, Guatemala	Costa Rica	2–1	2–1	2002 FIFA World Cup qualification	
9	6 January 2001	Miami Orange Bowl, Miami, United States	Costa Rica	1–0	2–5	2002 FIFA World Cup qualification	
10	6 January 2001	Miami Orange Bowl, Miami, United States	Costa Rica	2–5	2–5	2002 FIFA World Cup qualification	
11	6 January 2002	Estadio Pedro Marrero, Havana, Cuba	Cuba	1–0	1–0	Friendly	
12	31 October 2002	Estadio Cementos Progreso, Guatemala City, Guatemala	Jamaica	1–0	1–1	Friendly	
13	18 February 2003	Estadio Rommel Fernández, Panama City, Panama	Nicaragua	1–0	5–0	2003 UNCAF Nations Cup	
14	18 February 2003	Estadio Rommel Fernández, Panama City, Panama	Nicaragua	2–0	5–0	2003 UNCAF Nations Cup	
15	18 February 2003	Estadio Rommel Fernández, Panama City, Panama	Nicaragua	3–0	5–0	2003 UNCAF Nations Cup	
16	16 July 2003	Miami Orange Bowl, Miami, United States	Colombia	–	1–1	2003 CONCACAF Gold Cup	
17	5 May 2004	Estadio Doroteo Guamuch Flores, Guatemala City, Guatemala	Haiti	1–0	1–0	Friendly	
18	20 June 2004	Estadio Doroteo Guamuch Flores, Guatemala City, Guatemala	Suriname	1–0	3–1	2006 FIFA World Cup qualification	
19	20 June 2004	Estadio Doroteo Guamuch Flores, Guatemala City, Guatemala	Suriname	3–1	3–1	2006 FIFA World Cup qualification	
20	18 August 2004	Swangard Stadium, Burnaby, Canada	Canada	1–0	2–0	2006 FIFA World Cup qualification	
21	18 August 2004	Swangard Stadium, Burnaby, Canada	Canada	2–0	2–0	2006 FIFA World Cup qualification	
22	8 September 2004	Estadio Olímpico Metropolitano, San Pedro Sula, Honduras	Honduras	1–0	2–2	2006 FIFA World Cup qualification	
23	13 October 2004	Estadio Doroteo Guamuch Flores, Guatemala City, Guatemala	Honduras	1–0	1–0	2006 FIFA World Cup qualification	
24	13 November 2004	Robert F. Kennedy Memorial Stadium, Washington, D.C., United States	Bolivia	1–0	1–0	Friendly	
25	21 December 2004	Brígido Iriarte Stadium, Caracas, Venezuela	Venezuela	1–0	1–0	Friendly	
26	17 January 2005	Los Angeles Memorial Coliseum, Los Angeles, United States	Colombia	1–0	1–1	Friendly	
27	26 March 2005	Estadio Doroteo Guamuch Flores, Guatemala City, Guatemala	Trinidad and Tobago	2–0	5–1	2006 FIFA World Cup qualification	
28	26 March 2005	Estadio Doroteo Guamuch Flores, Guatemala City, Guatemala	Trinidad and Tobago	3–1	5–1	2006 FIFA World Cup qualification	
29	8 July 2005	Home Depot Center, Carson, United States	Jamaica	1–2	3–4	2005 CONCACAF Gold Cup	
30	8 July 2005	Home Depot Center, Carson, United States	Jamaica	2–2	3–4	2005 CONCACAF Gold Cup	
31	8 July 2005	Home Depot Center, Carson, United States	Jamaica	3–4	3–4	2005 CONCACAF Gold Cup	
32	8 October 2005	Estadio Alfonso Lastras, San Luis Potosí, Mexico	Mexico	1–0	2–5	2006 FIFA World Cup qualification	
33	12 October 2005	Estadio Doroteo Guamuch Flores, Guatemala City, Guatemala	Costa Rica	3–0	3–1	2006 FIFA World Cup qualification	
34	10 October 2006	Herndon Stadium, Atlanta, United States	Honduras	1–2	1–2	Friendly	
35	12 June 2007	Gillette Stadium, Foxborough, United States	Trinidad and Tobago	1–0	1–1	2007 CONCACAF Gold Cup	
36	14 June 2008	Estadio Doroteo Guamuch Flores, Guatemala City, Guatemala	Saint Lucia	2–0	6–0	2010 FIFA World Cup qualification	
37	14 June 2008	Estadio Doroteo Guamuch Flores, Guatemala City, Guatemala	Saint Lucia	3–0	6–0	2010 FIFA World Cup qualification	
38	14 June 2008	Estadio Doroteo Guamuch Flores, Guatemala City, Guatemala	Saint Lucia	4–0	6–0	2010 FIFA World Cup qualification	
39	14 June 2008	Estadio Doroteo Guamuch Flores, Guatemala City, Guatemala	Saint Lucia	6–0	6–0	2010 FIFA World Cup qualification	
40	10 September 2008	Estadio Doroteo Guamuch Flores, Guatemala City, Guatemala	Cuba	1–1	4–1	2010 FIFA World Cup qualification	
41	10 September 2008	Estadio Doroteo Guamuch Flores, Guatemala City, Guatemala	Cuba	2–1	4–1	2010 FIFA World Cup qualification	
42	28 March 2011	Estadio Carlos Salazar Hijo, Mazatenango, Guatemala	Bolivia	1–0	1–1	Friendly	
43	13 June 2011	Red Bull Arena, Harrison, United States	Grenada	3–0	4–0	2011 CONCACAF Gold Cup	
44	18 June 2011	MetLife Stadium, East Rutherford, United States	Mexico	1–0	1–2	2011 CONCACAF Gold Cup	
45	11 October 2011	Estadio Doroteo Guamuch Flores, Guatemala City, Guatemala	Belize	3–1	3–1	2014 FIFA World Cup qualification	
46	22 February 2012	Estadio Feliciano Cáceres, Luque, Paraguay	Paraguay	1–2	1–2	Friendly	
47	25 May 2012	Estadio Nacional, San José, Costa Rica	Costa Rica	1–0	2–3	Friendly	
48	25 May 2012	Estadio Nacional, San José, Costa Rica	Costa Rica	2–2	2–3	Friendly	
49	1 June 2012	Estadio Doroteo Guamuch Flores, Guatemala City, Guatemala	Costa Rica	1–0	1–0	Friendly	
50	15 August 2012	Robert F. Kennedy Memorial Stadium, Washington, D.C., United States	Paraguay	3–3	3–3	Friendly	
51	7 September 2012	Estadio Doroteo Guamuch Flores, Guatemala City, Guatemala	Antigua and Barbuda	1–1	3–1	2014 FIFA World Cup qualification	
52	7 September 2012	Estadio Doroteo Guamuch Flores, Guatemala City, Guatemala	Antigua and Barbuda	2–1	3–1	2014 FIFA World Cup qualification	
53	11 September 2012	Sir Vivian Richards Stadium, North Sound, Antigua and Barbuda	Antigua and Barbuda	1–0	1–0	2014 FIFA World Cup qualification	
54	12 October 2012	Estadio Doroteo Guamuch Flores, Guatemala City, Guatemala	Jamaica	2–1	2–1	2014 FIFA World Cup qualification	
55	16 October 2012	Children's Mercy Park, Kansas City, United States	United States	1–0	1–3	2014 FIFA World Cup qualification	
56	7 September 2014	Cotton Bowl, Dallas, United States	Belize	1–0	2–1	2014 Copa Centroamericana	
57	13 September 2014	Los Angeles Memorial Coliseum, Los Angeles, United States	Costa Rica	1–0	1–2	2014 Copa Centroamericana	
58	9 July 2015	Soldier Field, Chicago, United States	Trinidad and Tobago	1–3	1–3	2015 CONCACAF Gold Cup	
59	8 September 2015	Estadio Doroteo Guamuch Flores, Guatemala City, Guatemala	Antigua and Barbuda	1–0	2–0	2018 FIFA World Cup qualification	
60	25 March 2016	Estadio Doroteo Guamuch Flores, Guatemala City, Guatemala	United States	2–0	2–0	2018 FIFA World Cup qualification	
61	28 May 2016	StubHub Center, Carson, United States	Armenia	1–0	1–7	Friendly	
62	2 September 2016	Hasely Crawford Stadium, Port of Spain, Trinidad and Tobago	Trinidad and Tobago	1–0	2–2	2018 FIFA World Cup qualification	
63	2 September 2016	Hasely Crawford Stadium, Port of Spain, Trinidad and Tobago	Trinidad and Tobago	2–2	2–2	2018 FIFA World Cup qualification	
64	6 September 2016	Estadio Doroteo Guamuch Flores, Guatemala City, Guatemala	Saint Vincent and the Grenadines	2–1	9–3	2018 FIFA World Cup qualification	
65	6 September 2016	Estadio Doroteo Guamuch Flores, Guatemala City, Guatemala	Saint Vincent and the Grenadines	3–1	9–3	2018 FIFA World Cup qualification	
66	6 September 2016	Estadio Doroteo Guamuch Flores, Guatemala City, Guatemala	Saint Vincent and the Grenadines	4–2	9–3	2018 FIFA World Cup qualification	
67	6 September 2016	Estadio Doroteo Guamuch Flores, Guatemala City, Guatemala	Saint Vincent and the Grenadines	6–2	9–3	2018 FIFA World Cup qualification	
68	6 September 2016	Estadio Doroteo Guamuch Flores, Guatemala City, Guatemala	Saint Vincent and the Grenadines	7–2	9–3	2018 FIFA World Cup qualification	

== Honours ==
Municipal

- Liga Nacional de Guatemala: Clausura 2000, Clausura 2002

Los Angeles Galaxy

- MLS Cup: 2002
- Supporters' Shield: 2002

DC United

- U.S. Open Cup: 2013

FC Dallas

- Supporters' Shield: 2016

Individual

- CONCACAF Gold Cup top scorer: 2005 (joint)
- MLS MVP: 2002
- MLS Goal of the Year: 2002
- MLS Best XI: 2002
- MLS Cup MVP: 2002
- MLS top scorer: 2002, 2003 (joint)
- MLS All-Star: 2002, 2003, 2004
- MLS All-Star Game MVP: 2003

== See also ==
- List of men's footballers with 100 or more international caps
- List of men's footballers with 50 or more international goals
- List of top international football goalscorers by country
