= 2018 FIFA World Cup qualification (CONCACAF) =

Tournament details
- Dates: 22 March 2015 – 10 October 2017
- Teams: 35 (from 1 confederation)

Tournament statistics
- Matches played: 112
- Goals scored: 319 (2.85 per match)
- Attendance: 1,930,157 (17,234 per match)
- Top scorer(s): (Guatemala) Carlos Ruiz (9 goals)

The North, Central American and Caribbean section of the 2018 FIFA World Cup qualification acted as qualifiers for the 2018 FIFA World Cup in Russia, for national teams which are members of the Confederation of North, Central American and Caribbean Association Football (CONCACAF). 3.5 slots (3 direct slots and 1 inter-confederation play-off slot) in the final tournament were available for CONCACAF teams.

In a change to previous qualification tournaments for this confederation, the first three rounds were played as knockout rounds, with both the fourth round and the final round (referred to as the "Hexagonal") played as group stages. The first round was played during the FIFA international dates of 23–31 March 2015. CONCACAF announced the full format details on 12 January 2015.

The United States failed to qualify for the World Cup finals for the first time since 1986 after a surprise defeat by Trinidad and Tobago. As a result, Panama reached the World Cup for the first time in their history.

== Format ==
The qualification structure was as follows:

- First round: 14 teams (lowest ranked teams were assigned spots 22–35) played home-and-away over two legs. The winners advanced to the second round.
- Second round: 20 teams (second lowest ranked teams were assigned spots 9–21 and seven first round winners) played home-and-away over two legs. The winners advanced to the third round.
- Third round: 12 teams (teams ranked 7–8 by CONCACAF and ten second round winners) played home-and-away over two legs. The winners advanced to the fourth round.
- Fourth round: 12 teams (teams ranked 1–6 by CONCACAF and six third round winners) were divided into three groups of four teams to play home-and-away round-robin matches. The top two of each group advanced to the fifth round.
- Fifth round: Six teams which had advanced from the fourth round played home-and-away round-robin matches in one group (often referred to as the "Hexagonal"). The top three qualified for the 2018 FIFA World Cup, and the fourth-placed team advanced to the inter-confederation play-offs.

== Entrants ==
All 35 FIFA-affiliated national teams from CONCACAF entered qualification. The seeding – used to draw the first four rounds of the qualifiers – was based on the FIFA World Rankings of August 2014 (shown in parentheses).

From the August 2014 FIFA World Rankings
Bye to fourth round (ranked 1st to 6th)	Bye to third round (ranked 7th to 8th)	Bye to second round (ranked 9th to 21st)	Competing in first round (ranked 22nd to 35th)
1. Costa Rica (15); 2. Mexico (17); 3. United States (18); 4. Honduras (43); 5. Panama (63); 6. Trinidad and Tobago (80)	7. Jamaica (85); 8. Haiti (117)	9. Canada (122); 10. Cuba (124); 11. Aruba (124); 12. Dominican Republic (126); 13. El Salvador (127); 14. Suriname (131); 15. Guatemala (134); 16. Saint Vincent and the Grenadines (134); 17. Saint Lucia (138); 18. Grenada (142); 19. Antigua and Barbuda (149); 20. Guyana (153); 21. Puerto Rico (155)	22. Saint Kitts and Nevis (159); 23. Belize (162); 24. Montserrat (165); 25. Dominica (168); 26. Barbados (169); 27. Bermuda (173); 28. Nicaragua (175); 29. Turks and Caicos Islands (181); 30. Curaçao (182); 31. U.S. Virgin Islands (191); 32. Bahamas (193); 33. Cayman Islands (197); 34. British Virgin Islands (201); 35. Anguilla (207)

== Schedule ==
The schedule of the competition was as follows.

Round	Matchday	Date
First round	First leg	22–31 March 2015
First round	Second leg	22–31 March 2015
Second round	First leg	8–16 June 2015
Second round	Second leg	8–16 June 2015
Third round	First leg	31 August – 8 September 2015
Third round	Second leg	31 August – 8 September 2015
Fourth round	Matchday 1	9–17 November 2015
Fourth round	Matchday 2	9–17 November 2015
Fourth round	Matchday 3	21–29 March 2016
Fourth round	Matchday 4	21–29 March 2016
Fourth round	Matchday 5	29 August – 6 September 2016
Fourth round	Matchday 6	29 August – 6 September 2016

Round	Matchday	Date
Fifth round	Matchday 1	7–15 November 2016
Fifth round	Matchday 2	7–15 November 2016
Fifth round	Matchday 3	20–28 March 2017
Fifth round	Matchday 4	20–28 March 2017
Fifth round	Matchday 5	5–13 June 2017
Fifth round	Matchday 6	5–13 June 2017
Fifth round	Matchday 7	28 August – 5 September 2017
Fifth round	Matchday 8	28 August – 5 September 2017
Fifth round	Matchday 9	2–10 October 2017
Fifth round	Matchday 10	2–10 October 2017

The inter-confederation play-offs were scheduled to be played between 6–14 November 2017.

== First round ==
The draw for the first round was held on 15 January 2015, 19:40 EST (UTC−5), at the W Hotel at Miami Beach, Florida, United States.

Team 1	Agg.	Team 2	1st leg	2nd leg
Bahamas	0–8	Bermuda	0–5	0–3
British Virgin Islands	2–3	Dominica	2–3	0–0
Barbados	4–1	U.S. Virgin Islands	0–1	4–0
Saint Kitts and Nevis	12–4 (Note: Order of legs reversed from originally published draw.)	Turks and Caicos Islands	6–2	6–2
Nicaragua	8–0	Anguilla	5–0	3–0
Belize	1–1 (a)	Cayman Islands	0–0	1–1
Curaçao	4–3	Montserrat	2–1	2–2

== Second round ==
The draw for the second round was held on 15 January 2015, 19:40 EST (UTC−5), at the W Hotel at Miami Beach, Florida, United States.

Team 1	Agg.	Team 2	1st leg	2nd leg
Saint Vincent and the Grenadines	6–6 (a)	Guyana	2–2	4–4
Antigua and Barbuda	5–4	Saint Lucia	1–3	4–1
Puerto Rico	1–2	Grenada	1–0	0–2
Dominica	0–6	Canada	0–2	0–4
Dominican Republic	1–5	Belize	1–2	0–3
Guatemala	1–0	Bermuda	0–0	1–0
Aruba	3–2	Barbados	0–2	3–0 (Note: FIFA awarded Aruba a 3–0 win as a result of Barbados fielding the ineligible player Hadan Holligan. Holligan failed to serve an automatic one match suspension for receiving two yellow cards earlier in the competition. The match originally ended 1–0 to Barbados.)
Saint Kitts and Nevis	3–6	El Salvador	2–2	1–4
Curaçao	1–1 (a)	Cuba	0–0	1–1
Nicaragua	4–1	Suriname	1–0	3–1

== Third round ==
The draw for the third round was held as part of the 2018 FIFA World Cup Preliminary Draw on 25 July 2015, starting 18:00 MSK (UTC+3), at the Konstantinovsky Palace in Strelna, Saint Petersburg, Russia.

Team 1	Agg.	Team 2	1st leg	2nd leg
Curaçao	0–2	El Salvador	0–1	0–1
Canada	4–1	Belize	3–0	1–1
Grenada	1–6	Haiti	1–3	0–3
Jamaica	4–3	Nicaragua	2–3	2–0
Saint Vincent and the Grenadines	3–2	Aruba	2–0	1–2
Antigua and Barbuda	1–2	Guatemala	1–0	0–2

== Fourth round ==
The draw for the fourth round was held as part of the 2018 FIFA World Cup Preliminary Draw on 25 July 2015, starting 18:00 MSK (UTC+3), at the Konstantinovsky Palace in Strelna, Saint Petersburg, Russia.

=== Groups ===
2018 FIFA World Cup qualification tiebreakers
In league format, the ranking of teams in each group was based on the following criteria (regulations Articles 20.6 and 20.7):
1. Points (3 points for a win, 1 point for a draw, 0 points for a loss)
2. Overall goal difference
3. Overall goals scored
4. Points in matches between tied teams
5. Goal difference in matches between tied teams
6. Goals scored in matches between tied teams
7. Away goals scored in matches between tied teams (if the tie was only between two teams in home-and-away league format)
8. Fair play points
  - first yellow card: minus 1 point
  - indirect red card (second yellow card): minus 3 points
  - direct red card: minus 4 points
  - yellow card and direct red card: minus 5 points
9. Drawing of lots by the FIFA Organising Committee

==== Group A ====
Pos	Team	Pld	W	D	L	GF	GA	GD	Pts	Qualification	Mexico	Honduras	Canada	El Salvador
1	Mexico	6	5	1	0	13	1	+12	16	Advance to fifth round	—	0–0	2–0	3–0
2	Honduras	6	2	2	2	6	6	0	8	Advance to fifth round	0–2	—	2–1	2–0
3	Canada	6	2	1	3	5	8	−3	7		0–3	1–0	—	3–1
4	El Salvador	6	0	2	4	4	13	−9	2		1–3	2–2	0–0	—

Source: FIFA

==== Group B ====
Pos	Team	Pld	W	D	L	GF	GA	GD	Pts	Qualification	Costa Rica	Panama	Haiti	Jamaica
1	Costa Rica	6	5	1	0	11	3	+8	16	Advance to fifth round	—	3–1	1–0	3–0
2	Panama	6	3	1	2	7	5	+2	10	Advance to fifth round	1–2	—	1–0	2–0
3	Haiti	6	1	1	4	2	4	−2	4		0–1	0–0	—	0–1
4	Jamaica	6	1	1	4	2	10	−8	4		1–1	0–2	0–2	—

Source: FIFA

==== Group C ====
Pos	Team	Pld	W	D	L	GF	GA	GD	Pts	Qualification	United States	Trinidad and Tobago	Guatemala	Saint Vincent and the Grenadines
1	United States	6	4	1	1	20	3	+17	13	Advance to fifth round	—	4–0	4–0	6–1
2	Trinidad and Tobago	6	3	2	1	13	9	+4	11	Advance to fifth round	0–0	—	2–2	6–0
3	Guatemala	6	3	1	2	18	11	+7	10		2–0	1–2	—	9–3
4	Saint Vincent and the Grenadines	6	0	0	6	6	34	−28	0		0–6	2–3	0–4	—

Source: FIFA

== Fifth round ==
As with every World Cup qualification campaign since 1998, CONCACAF held a six-team, home-and-away round-robin group known as the 'Hexagonal', or 'Hex', as its final and decisive round. As a result of the abolition of the February and August fixtures from the FIFA calendar, the 'Hex' for the first time was not contained within a single calendar year, but instead began in November 2016 and concluded in October 2017.

The draw for the fifth round (to decide the fixtures) was held on 8 July 2016, 10:00 EDT (UTC−4), at the CONCACAF headquarters in Miami Beach, United States.

2018 FIFA World Cup qualification tiebreakers
In league format, the ranking of teams in each group was based on the following criteria (regulations Articles 20.6 and 20.7):
1. Points (3 points for a win, 1 point for a draw, 0 points for a loss)
2. Overall goal difference
3. Overall goals scored
4. Points in matches between tied teams
5. Goal difference in matches between tied teams
6. Goals scored in matches between tied teams
7. Away goals scored in matches between tied teams (if the tie was only between two teams in home-and-away league format)
8. Fair play points
  - first yellow card: minus 1 point
  - indirect red card (second yellow card): minus 3 points
  - direct red card: minus 4 points
  - yellow card and direct red card: minus 5 points
9. Drawing of lots by the FIFA Organising Committee

Pos	Team	Pld	W	D	L	GF	GA	GD	Pts	Qualification	(Mexico)	(Costa Rica)	(Panama)	(Honduras)	(United States)	(Trinidad and Tobago)
1	Mexico	10	6	3	1	16	7	+9	21	Qualification to 2018 FIFA World Cup	—	2–0	1–0	3–0	1–1	3–1
2	Costa Rica	10	4	4	2	14	8	+6	16	Qualification to 2018 FIFA World Cup	1–1	—	0–0	1–1	4–0	2–1
3	Panama	10	3	4	3	9	10	−1	13	Qualification to 2018 FIFA World Cup	0–0	2–1	—	2–2	1–1	3–0
4	Honduras	10	3	4	3	13	19	−6	13	Advance to inter-confederation play-offs	3–2	1–1	0–1	—	1–1	3–1
5	United States	10	3	3	4	17	13	+4	12		1–2	0–2	4–0	6–0	—	2–0
6	Trinidad and Tobago	10	2	0	8	7	19	−12	6		0–1	0–2	1–0	1–2	2–1	—

Source: FIFA

== Inter-confederation play-offs ==
The draw for the inter-confederation play-offs was held as part of the 2018 FIFA World Cup Preliminary Draw on 25 July 2015, starting 18:00 MSK (UTC+3), at the Konstantinovsky Palace in Strelna, Saint Petersburg. The fourth-placed team from CONCACAF was drawn against the fifth-placed team from Asian Football Confederation (AFC), with the CONCACAF team hosting the first leg.

Team 1	Agg.	Team 2	1st leg	2nd leg
Honduras	1–3	Australia	0–0	1–3

== Qualified teams ==
The following three teams from CONCACAF qualified for the final tournament.

Team	Qualified as	Qualified on	Previous appearances in FIFA World Cup^{1}
Mexico	Fifth round winners	1 September 2017	15 (1930, 1950, 1954, 1958, 1962, 1966, 1970, 1978, 1986, 1994, 1998, 2002, 2006, 2010, 2014)
Costa Rica	Fifth round runners-up	7 October 2017	4 (1990, 2002, 2006, 2014)
Panama	Fifth round third place	10 October 2017	0 (debut)

^{1} Italic indicates hosts for that year.

== Top goalscorers ==
There were 319 goals scored in 112 matches, for an average of 2.85 goals per match.

9 goals

- (Guatemala) Carlos Ruiz

8 goals

- (United States) Jozy Altidore

7 goals

- (United States) Christian Pulisic

6 goals

- (Honduras) Romell Quioto

5 goals

- (El Salvador) Nelson Bonilla
- (Saint Vincent and the Grenadines) Oalex Anderson
- (Saint Vincent and the Grenadines) Tevin Slater
- (Trinidad and Tobago) Joevin Jones
- (United States) Clint Dempsey
- (United States) Bobby Wood

4 goals

- (Belize) Deon McCaulay
- (Canada) Cyle Larin
- (Canada) Tosaint Ricketts
- (Costa Rica) Christian Bolaños
- (Costa Rica) Marco Ureña
- (Honduras) Alberth Elis
- (Mexico) Hirving Lozano

Below are full goalscorer lists for each round:

- First round
- Second round
- Third round
- Fourth round
- Fifth round
