= Tevin Slater =

Vincentian footballer

Personal information
- Full name: Tevin Slater
- Date of birth: 13 January 1994 (age 32)
- Place of birth: Kingstown, Saint Vincent and the Grenadines
- Position: Striker

Team information
- Current team: Parham FC

Senior career*
Years	Team	Apps	(Gls)
2015	Camdonia Chelsea		
2015–	Parham FC	0	(0)

International career^{‡}
2014–2016	Saint Vincent and the Grenadines	17	(8)
- * Club domestic league appearances and goals ‡ National team caps and goals as of 14 April 2023

Tevin Slater (born 13 January 1994) is a Saint Vincent and the Grenadines footballer who plays for Parham FC of the Antigua and Barbuda Premier Division. He has 12 caps for the national team and has scored 8 times. In 2015, he was named the Senior Footballer of the Year by the Saint Vincent and the Grenadines Football Federation.

== Career ==
=== Club ===
In late September 2015, it was announced that Slater had signed for Parham FC of the Antigua and Barbuda Premier Division. He had previously played for Camdonia Chelsea SC.

=== International ===
Slater made his debut for Saint Vincent and the Grenadines during the 2014 Windward Islands Tournament in their 3-2 win over host nation Dominica. His first international goal came during a 2-2 draw against Barbados. Slater's next goal would come during qualification to the 2018 FIFA World Cup when he scored in a 2-2 draw against Guyana.

=== National Team Goals ===
Scores and results list St Vincent and the Grenadines goal tally first.

#	Date	Venue	Opponent	Score	Result	Competition
1	8 March 2015	Barbados National Stadium, St. Michael, Barbados	Barbados	2-2	2-2	Friendly
2	10 June 2015	Arnos Vale Stadium, Kingstown, St Vincent	Guyana	2–2	2–2	2018 FIFA World Cup qualification
3	14 June 2015	Providence Stadium, Providence, Guyana	Guyana	2–1	4-4	2018 FIFA World Cup qualification
4	14 June 2015	Providence Stadium, Providence, Guyana	Guyana	3–2	4-4	2018 FIFA World Cup qualification
5	28 August 2015	Victoria Park, Kingstown, Saint Vincent	Barbados	2–0	2–2	Friendly
6	5 September 2015	Arnos Vale Stadium, Kingstown, Saint Vincent	Aruba	1–0	2–0	2018 FIFA World Cup qualification
7	8 September 2015	Trinidad Stadium, Oranjestad, Aruba	Aruba	1–2	1-2	2018 FIFA World Cup qualification
8	4 November 2015	Arnos Vale Stadium, Kingstown, Saint Vincent	Antigua and Barbuda	1–1	2-1	Friendly

== Personal life ==
In October 2018, Slater was injured in a car accident that killed one and injured two others.
