= Canada at the CONCACAF Gold Cup =

Sporting event delegation

The CONCACAF Gold Cup is North America's major tournament in senior men's soccer and determines the continental champion. Until 1989, the CONCACAF Championship was the regions' primary competition. It is currently held every two years. In earlier editions, the continental championship was held in different countries, but since the inception of the Gold Cup in 1991, the United States have hosted or co-hosted every tournament. Since then it has expanded to more countries in North America.

From 1973 to 1989, the tournament doubled as the confederation's World Cup qualification. CONCACAF's representative team at the FIFA Confederations Cup was decided by a play-off between the winners of the last two tournament editions in 2015 via the CONCACAF Cup, but was then discontinued along with the Confederations Cup.

Since the inaugural tournament in 1963, the Gold Cup was held 28 times and has been won by seven different nations, most often by Mexico (13 titles).

Canada entered the tournament for the first time in 1973, and have qualified for 19 more tournaments since then. Often, they qualified automatically. In 2015, Canada co-hosted the tournament. However, only two group matches were played in Toronto, and the rest at different venues within the United States. They again co-hosted in 2023 and 2025, with a match again played in Toronto in 2023, and in Vancouver in 2025.

Canada is one of only four teams to have won the continental championship more than once. They won their first title in 1985, excluding Mexico (hosts) a year in which the tournament doubled as CONCACAF's qualification phase for the 1986 FIFA World Cup. The second title was won in 2000, when Canada beat invitees Colombia 2–0 in the final in Los Angeles. as well as Mexico and Trinidad and Tobago on route. Key to Canada’s success was Carlo Corazzin winning the golden boot and goalkeeper Craig Forrest winning best player, a rare accolade for a goalkeeper at an international tournament.

== Overall record ==
CONCACAF Championship / Gold Cup record										Qualification record					
Year	Result	Position	Pld	W	D*	L	GF	GA	Squad	Pld	W	D*	L	GF	GA
(El Salvador) 1963	Did not enter									Did not enter					
(Guatemala) 1965	Did not enter									Did not enter					
(Honduras) 1967	Did not enter									Did not enter					
(Costa Rica) 1969	Did not enter									Did not enter					
(Trinidad and Tobago) 1971	Did not enter									Did not enter					
(Haiti) 1973	Did not qualify									4	1	1	2	6	7
(Mexico) 1977	Fourth place	4th	5	2	1	2	7	8	Squad	5	2	2	1	5	3
(Honduras) 1981	Fourth place	4th	5	1	3	1	6	6	Squad	4	1	3	0	4	3
1985	Champions	1st	8	5	3	0	11	4	Squad	Qualified automatically					
1989	Did not qualify									2	1	0	1	3	3
(United States) 1991	Group stage	6th	3	1	0	2	6	9	Squad	Qualified automatically					
(Mexico) (United States) 1993	Group stage	6th	3	0	2	1	3	11	Squad	Qualified automatically					
(United States) 1996	Group stage	5th	2	1	0	1	4	5	Squad	Qualified automatically					
(United States) 1998	Withdrew									Withdrew					
(United States) 2000	Champions	1st	5	3	2	0	7	3	Squad	3	2	1	0	4	2
(United States) 2002	Third place	3rd	5	2	2	1	5	4	Squad	Qualified automatically					
(Mexico) (United States) 2003	Group stage	9th	2	1	0	1	1	2	Squad	Qualified automatically					
(United States) 2005	Group stage	9th	3	1	0	2	2	4	Squad	Qualified automatically					
(United States) 2007	Semi-finals	3rd	5	3	0	2	9	5	Squad	Qualified automatically					
(United States) 2009	Quarter-finals	5th	4	2	1	1	4	3	Squad	Qualified automatically					
(United States) 2011	Group stage	9th	3	1	1	1	2	3	Squad	Qualified automatically					
(United States) 2013	Group stage	11th	3	0	1	2	0	3	Squad	Qualified automatically					
(Canada) (United States) 2015	Group stage	10th	3	0	2	1	0	1	Squad	Qualified automatically					
(United States) 2017	Quarter-finals	6th	4	1	2	1	6	5	Squad	Qualified automatically					
(Costa Rica) (Jamaica) (United States) 2019	Quarter-finals	6th	4	2	0	2	14	6	Squad	4	4	0	0	18	1
(United States) 2021	Semi-finals	4th	5	3	0	2	11	5	Squad	4	3	0	1	10	4
(Canada) (United States) 2023	Quarter-finals	6th	4	1	3	0	8	6	Squad	4	3	0	1	11	3
(Canada) (United States) 2025	Quarter-finals	6th	4	2	2	0	10	2	Squad	2	2	0	0	4	0
2027	Qualified									2	2	0	0	7	3
Total	2 Titles	21/29	80	32	25	23	116	95	—	34	21	7	6	72	29

*Denotes draws include knockout matches decided via penalty shoot-out.

== 1977 CONCACAF Championship ==
Pos	Team	Pld	W	D	L	GF	GA	GD	Pts	Qualification
1	Mexico (C)	5	5	0	0	20	5	+15	10	1978 FIFA World Cup
2	Haiti	5	3	1	1	6	6	0	7	
3	El Salvador	5	2	1	2	8	9	−1	5	
4	Canada	5	2	1	2	7	8	−1	5	
5	Guatemala	5	1	1	3	8	10	−2	3	
6	Suriname	5	0	0	5	6	17	−11	0	

Source: RSSSF
(C) Champions
8 October 1977

Canada	1–2	El Salvador
Budd 85'		Zapata 44', 84'

Estadio Universitario, Monterrey
Attendance: 42,000
Referee: Pestarino (Argentina)

12 October 1977

Canada	2–1	Suriname
Parsons 32'; Bakić 74'		Olmberg 40' (pen.)

Estadio Azteca, Mexico City
Attendance: 90,000
Referee: Siles Calderón (Costa Rica)

16 October 1977

Canada	2–1	Guatemala
Parsons 20'; B. Lenarduzzi 35'		Alfaro 62'

Estadio Azteca, Mexico City
Attendance: 25,000
Referee: Barreto Ruiz (Uruguay)

20 October 1977

Canada	1–1	Haiti
Bakić 90'		Dorsainville 78'

Estadio Universitario, Monterrey
Attendance: 30,000
Referee: Valverde Salazar (Costa Rica)

22 October 1977

Mexico	3–1	Canada
Guzmán 31', 40'; Sánchez 65'		Parsons 9'

Estadio Universitario, Monterrey
Attendance: 55,000
Referee: Moses (Netherlands Antilles)

== 1981 CONCACAF Championship ==
Pos	Team	Pld	W	D	L	GF	GA	GD	Pts
1	Honduras	5	3	2	0	8	1	+7	8
2	El Salvador	5	2	2	1	2	1	+1	6
3	Mexico	5	1	3	1	6	3	+3	5
4	Canada	5	1	3	1	6	6	0	5
5	Cuba	5	1	2	2	4	8	−4	4
6	Haiti	5	0	2	3	2	9	−7	2

Source: RSSSF
2 November 1981

Canada	1–0	El Salvador
Stojanovic 90'

Estadio Tiburcio Carías Andino, Tegucigalpa, Honduras
Attendance: 31,570
Referee: Pagano Trucios (Peru)

6 November 1981

Haiti	1–1	Canada
Romulas 34'		Stojanovic 50'

Estadio Tiburcio Carías Andino, Tegucigalpa, Honduras
Attendance: 33,237
Referee: Gracias Regalado (Guatemala)

12 November 1981

Honduras	2–1	Canada
Caballero 12'; Figueroa 40'		Bridge 19'

Estadio Tiburcio Carías Andino, Tegucigalpa, Honduras
Attendance: 38,953
Referee: Méndez Molina (Guatemala)

15 November 1981

Mexico	1–1	Canada
Castro 29'		Bridge 57'

Estadio Tiburcio Carías Andino, Tegucigalpa, Honduras
Attendance: 22,395
Referee: Socha (United States)

21 November 1981

Cuba	2–2	Canada
Núñez 2'; Rodríguez 74'		McLeod 48'; Iarusci 84'

Estadio Tiburcio Carías Andino, Tegucigalpa, Honduras
Attendance: 16,458
Referee: Pagano Trucios (Peru)

== 1985 CONCACAF Championship ==
The 1985 Championship was played over a seven-month period. The nine teams played in three round-robin groups. The three winners played the final round-robin group in August and September.

Thanks to Canada's away win in Honduras three weeks earlier, Canada was one point ahead in the group table before the final match. This meant the winner would win the tournament and qualify for the 1986 FIFA World Cup. Considering the following 2–1 victory over Honduras came hand-in-hand with Canada's first and only World Cup qualification, it can be considered Canada's greatest success in soccer history. However, they managed to avoid the "big two", Mexico and the United States, because Mexico did not participate as hosts of the 1986 World Cup and the U.S. were eliminated by Costa Rica in the first round.

At the World Cup the following year, Canada was eliminated after three defeats in the Group Stage to France, Hungary and the Soviet Union.

=== Match overview ===
Round	Opponent	Score	Result	Venue	Scorer(s)
First round	Haiti	2–0	W	Victoria, Canada	I. Vrablic, M. Sweeney
First round	Guatemala	2–1	W	Victoria, Canada	D. Mitchell (2)
First round	Guatemala	1–1	D	Guatemala City, Guatemala	D. Mitchell
First round	Haiti	2–0	W	Port-au-Prince, Haiti	D. Mitchell, I. Vrablic
Final round	Costa Rica	1–1	D	Toronto, Canada	P. James
Final round	Honduras	1–0	W	Tegucigalpa, Honduras	G. Pakos
Final round	Costa Rica	0–0	D	San José, Costa Rica	
Final round	Honduras	2–1	W	St John's, Canada	G. Pakos, I. Vrablic

== 1991 CONCACAF Gold Cup ==
=== Group A ===
Pos	Team	Pld	W	D	L	GF	GA	GD	Pts	Qualification
1	Honduras	3	2	1	0	10	3	+7	5	Advance to knockout stage
2	Mexico	3	2	1	0	8	3	+5	5	Advance to knockout stage
3	Canada	3	1	0	2	6	9	−3	2	
4	Jamaica	3	0	0	3	3	12	−9	0	

Source: RSSSF
June 28, 1991

Canada	2–4	Honduras
Mitchell 66', 80'	Report	Bennett 28' (pen.); Espinoza 34'; Cálix 41'; Flores 51'

Memorial Coliseum, Los Angeles
Attendance: 13,374
Referee: Arturo Angeles (United States)

June 30, 1991

Canada	1–3	Mexico
Lowery 83'	Report	Hermosillo 3' de la Torre 40'; Galindo 89' (pen.)

Memorial Coliseum, Los Angeles
Attendance: 45,797
Referee: Ronald Gutiérrez (Costa Rica)

July 2, 1991

Jamaica	2–3	Canada
Wright 42'; Reid 63'	Report	Mitchell 34'; Miller 54'; Limniatis 60'

Memorial Coliseum, Los Angeles
Attendance: 36,703
Referee: José Carlos Ortíz (El Salvador)

== 1993 CONCACAF Gold Cup ==
=== Group B ===
Pos	Team	Pld	W	D	L	GF	GA	GD	Pts	Qualification
1	Mexico (H)	3	2	1	0	18	1	+17	5	Advanced to knockout stage
2	Costa Rica	3	1	2	0	5	3	+2	4	Advanced to knockout stage
3	Canada	3	0	2	1	3	11	−8	2	
4	Martinique	3	0	1	2	3	14	−11	1	

Source: CONCACAF
(H) Co-host
11 July 1993

Canada	1–1	Costa Rica
Dasovic 43'	Report	Myers 81'

Estadio Azteca, Mexico City
Attendance: 17,000
Referee: Mark Forde (Brazil)

15 July 1993

Canada	2–2	Martinique
Aunger 25'; Bunbury 43'	Report	Gertrude 53'; Fondelot 86'

Estadio Azteca, Mexico City
Attendance: 31,000
Referee: Argelio Sabillón (Honduras)

18 July 1993

Mexico	8–0	Canada
Rodríguez 4', 67'; Mora 24', 31'; Zague 34', 38'; Salvador 82', 85'	Report

Estadio Azteca, Mexico City
Attendance: 100,000
Referee: Raúl Domínguez (United States)

== 1996 CONCACAF Gold Cup ==
=== Group B ===
Pos	Team	Pld	W	D	L	GF	GA	GD	Pts	Qualification
1	Brazil	2	2	0	0	9	1	+8	6	Advance to Knockout stage
2	Canada	2	1	0	1	4	5	−1	3	
3	Honduras	2	0	0	2	1	8	−7	0	

January 10, 1996

Canada	3–1	Honduras
Corazzin 9'; Holness 27', 63'	Report	Carson 40'

Anaheim Stadium, Anaheim
Attendance: 27,125
Referee: Peter Prendergast (Jamaica)

January 12, 1996

Brazil	4–1	Canada
André Luis 3'; Caio 7'; Sávio 14'; Leandro Machado 86'	Report	Radzinski 66'

Los Angeles Memorial Coliseum, Los Angeles
Attendance: 8,234
Referee: Ronald Gutiérrez (Costa Rica)

== 2000 CONCACAF Gold Cup ==
At the 2000 Gold Cup, twelve nations were divided into four groups of three teams, the first two of which would qualify for the knock-out matches. With Colombia, Peru and South Korea, three Non-CONCACAF-members participated as invitees.

After all three matches of Canada's Group D ended as draws, a coin toss was needed to determine whether Canada or South Korea would advance to the knockout stage. Canada won the toss and eventually the tournament, eliminating Mexico on the way and winning the final 2–0 against Colombia.

The title victory allowed Canada to represent CONCACAF at the 2001 Confederations Cup, where they were eliminated in the Group Stage.

=== Match overview ===
Round	Opponent	Score	Result	Venue	Scorer(s)
Group stage	Costa Rica	2–2	D	San Diego, United States	C. Corazzin (2)
Group stage	South Korea	0–0	D	Los Angeles, United States	
Quarter-finals	Mexico	2–1 (a.e.t.)	W	San Diego, United States	C. Corazzin, R. Hastings
Semi-finals	Trinidad and Tobago	1–0	W	Los Angeles, United States	M. Watson
Final	Colombia	2–0	W	Los Angeles, United States	J. de Vos, C. Corazzin

== 2002 CONCACAF Gold Cup ==
=== Group D ===
Pos	Team	Pld	W	D	L	GF	GA	GD	Pts	Qualification
1	Canada	2	1	0	1	2	2	0	3	Advance to Knockout stage
2	Haiti	2	1	0	1	2	2	0	3	Advance to Knockout stage
3	Ecuador	2	1	0	1	2	2	0	3	

January 18, 2002
21:00 UTC−5

Haiti	0–2	Canada
	Report	McKenna 28', 48'

Orange Bowl, Miami
Attendance: 14,508
Referee: Roberto Moreno (Panama)

January 22, 2002
21:00 UTC−5

Canada	0–2	Ecuador
	Report	Aguinaga 88', 90'

Orange Bowl, Miami
Attendance: 3,827
Referee: Brian Hall United States)

=== Quarterfinals ===
January 26, 2002
17:30 UTC−5

Canada	1–1 (a.e.t.)	Martinique
McKenna 73'	Report	Rogers 63' (o.g.)
Penalties
McKenna (penalty scored); Brennan (penalty missed); De Rosario (penalty scored); Nsaliwa (penalty scored); De Vos (penalty scored); Stalteri (penalty scored); Bent (penalty scored)	6–5	(penalty scored) Lupon; (penalty scored) Clement; (penalty scored) DiCanot; (penalty scored) Mirande; (penalty missed) Reuperne; (penalty scored) Heurlie; (penalty missed) Lina

Orange Bowl, Miami
Attendance: 14,823
Referee: Carlos Batres (Guatemala)

=== Semifinals ===
January 30, 2002
20:30 UTC−8

Canada	0–0 (a.e.t.)	United States
	Report
Penalties
McKenna (penalty missed); Stalteri (penalty scored); De Rosario (penalty scored); Nsaliwa (penalty missed)	2–4	(penalty scored) Donovan; (penalty scored) McBride; (penalty scored) Agoos; (penalty scored) Mathis

Rose Bowl, Pasadena
Attendance: 7,241
Referee: Prendergast (JAM)

=== Third place match ===
February 2, 2002
10:00 UTC−8

Canada	2–1	South Korea
Kim Do-hoon 34' (o.g.); De Rosario 35'	Report	Kim Do-hoon 15'

Rose Bowl, Pasadena
Attendance: 14,432
Referee: Noel Bynoe (Trinidad and Tobago)

== 2003 CONCACAF Gold Cup ==
=== Group D ===
Pos	Team	Pld	W	D	L	GF	GA	GD	Pts	Qualification
1	Costa Rica	2	1	0	1	3	1	+2	3	Advance to Knockout stage
2	Cuba	2	1	0	1	2	3	−1	3	Advance to Knockout stage
3	Canada	2	1	0	1	1	2	−1	3	

July 12, 2003
13:00

Canada	1–0	Costa Rica
Stalteri 59'	Report

Gillette Stadium, Foxboro
Attendance: 33,652
Referee: Richard Piper (Trinidad and Tobago)

July 14, 2003

Cuba	2–0	Canada
Moré 15', 46'	Report

Gillette Stadium, Foxboro
Attendance: 8,780
Referee: Peter Prendergast (Jamaica)

== 2005 CONCACAF Gold Cup ==
=== Group B ===
Pos	Team	Pld	W	D	L	GF	GA	GD	Pts	Qualification
1	United States	3	2	1	0	6	1	+5	7	Advance to Knockout stage
2	Costa Rica	3	2	1	0	4	1	+3	7	Advance to Knockout stage
3	Canada	3	1	0	2	2	4	−2	3	
4	Cuba	3	0	0	3	3	9	−6	0	

July 7, 2005
17:30

Canada	0–1	Costa Rica
	Report	Soto 30' (pen.)

Qwest Field, Seattle
Attendance: 15,831
Referee: Peter Prendergast (Jamaica)

July 9, 2005
13:30

United States	2–0	Canada
Hutchinson 48' (o.g.); Donovan 90'	(Report)

Qwest Field, Seattle
Attendance: 15,109
Referee: Neal Brizan (Trinidad and Tobago)

July 12, 2005
21:00

Canada	2–1	Cuba
Gerba 69'; Hutchinson 87'	Report	Cervantes 90'

Gillette Stadium, Foxboro
Attendance: 15,211
Referee: Roberto Moreno (Panama)

== 2007 CONCACAF Gold Cup ==
=== Group A ===
Pos	Team	Pld	W	D	L	GF	GA	GD	Pts	Qualification
1	Canada	3	2	0	1	5	3	+2	6	Advance to Knockout stage
2	Costa Rica	3	1	1	1	3	3	0	4	Advance to Knockout stage
3	Guadeloupe	3	1	1	1	3	3	0	4	Advance to Knockout stage
4	Haiti	3	0	2	1	2	4	−2	2	

June 6, 2007
19:00 UTC−4

Costa Rica	1–2	Canada
Centeno 56'	Report	De Guzman 57', 73'

Orange Bowl, Miami
Attendance: 17,420
Referee: Enrico Wijngaarde (Suriname)

June 9, 2007
19:00 UTC−4

Canada	1–2	Guadeloupe
Gerba 35'	Report	Angloma 10'; Fleurival 37'

Orange Bowl, Miami
Attendance: 22,529
Referee: Neal Brizan (Trinidad and Tobago)

June 11, 2007
21:00 UTC−4

Haiti	0–2	Canada
	Report	De Rosario 31', 35' (pen.)

Orange Bowl, Miami
Attendance: 15,892
Referee: Marco Rodríguez (Mexico)

=== Quarter-finals ===
June 16, 2007
13:00 UTC−4

Canada	3–0	Guatemala
De Rosario 17'; Gerba 33', 44'	Report

Gillette Stadium, Foxborough
Attendance: 22,412
Referee: Courtney Campbell (Jamaica)

=== Semi-finals ===
June 21, 2007
18:00 UTC−5

Canada	1–2	United States
Hume 76'	Report	Hejduk 39'; Donovan 45+1' (pen.)

Soldier Field, Chicago
Attendance: 50,760
Referee: Benito Archundia (Mexico)

== 2009 CONCACAF Gold Cup ==
=== Group A ===
Pos	Team	Pld	W	D	L	GF	GA	GD	Pts	Qualification
1	Canada	3	2	1	0	4	2	+2	7	Advance to knockout stage
2	Costa Rica	3	1	1	1	4	4	0	4	Advance to knockout stage
3	Jamaica	3	1	0	2	1	2	−1	3	
4	El Salvador	3	1	0	2	2	3	−1	3	

July 3, 2009
17:00 UTC-7

Canada	1–0	Jamaica
Gerba 75'	Report

The Home Depot Center, Carson
Attendance: 27,000
Referee: Terry Vaughn (United States)

July 7, 2009
21:00 UTC-4

El Salvador	0–1	Canada
	Report	Gerba 32'

Columbus Crew Stadium, Columbus
Attendance: 7,059
Referee: Roberto García (Mexico)

July 10, 2009
19:00 UTC-4

Costa Rica	2–2	Canada
Herrón 23'; Centeno 35'	Report	Bernier 25'; De Jong 28'

FIU Stadium, Miami
Attendance: 17,269
Referee: Terry Vaughn (United States)

=== Quarter-finals ===
July 18, 2009
17:00 UTC-4

Canada	0–1	Honduras
	Report	Martínez 36' (pen.)

Lincoln Financial Field, Philadelphia
Attendance: 32,000
Referee: Joel Aguilar (El Salvador)

== 2011 CONCACAF Gold Cup ==
=== Group C ===
Group C of the 2011 CONCACAF Gold Cup was one of three groups competing at the tournament. The group's first round of matches were played on June 7, with the final round played on June 14. All six group matches were played at venues in the United States, in Detroit, Tampa and Kansas City. The group consisted of host, and four time Gold Cup champions, United States, 2000 Gold Cup champion Canada, as well as Panama and Guadeloupe.

== Summary ==
The group opened on June 7 with Panama taking an early three-goal lead against Guadeloupe before Brice Jovial of Guadeloupe brought the match within a goal's reach. However, the Panamanians were able to withstand Guadeloupe's late pressure and win their opening fixture. Immediately after the match, group favorites Canada and the United States squared off. Analysts claimed that the Canadian squad was the strongest in their history, possibly the strongest since the mid-1980s squad that qualified for the 1986 FIFA World Cup. For the Americans, they had come off a humbling 4–0 defeat in a tune up match against defending World champions, Spain. In spite of the rough patch endured by the United States, they were still considered favorites to beat Canada. Thanks to an early, 15th-minute goal from Jozy Altidore, along with a complementary second half goal from Clint Dempsey gave the United States a 2–0 win over Canada and the lead in the group.

While Canada expectedly defeated Guadeloupe on June 11, Panama pulled off a stunning 2–1 upset over the United States, in which some cited as possibly the largest upset of the entire tournament. The match marked the first time in Gold Cup history that the United States lost on its home soil during Group Stage play. It was also the first time since the 1985 CONCACAF Championship, that the United States lost on home ground in a continental tournament. Clearance Goodson scored the lone goal for the United States in the 66th minute, after he conceded an own goal for the Panamanians in the 19th minute. Panama's Gabriel Gómez converted a penalty kick in the 33rd minute, which ended up being the winner.

The group wrapped up play on June 14 with Panama and Canada playing each other followed by Guadeloupe taking on the United States. The matches were a doubleheader held at Livestrong Sporting Park in Kansas City.

== Standings ==
Key to colors in group tables
Teams that advanced to the quarterfinals: Group winners; Group runners-up; Best two third-placed teams among all groups

Pos	Team	Pld	W	D	L	GF	GA	GD	Pts	Qualification
1	Panama	3	2	1	0	6	4	+2	7	Advance to knockout stage
2	United States	3	2	0	1	4	2	+2	6	Advance to knockout stage
3	Canada	3	1	1	1	2	3	−1	4	
4	Guadeloupe	3	0	0	3	2	5	−3	0	

Source: CONCACAF

== Matches ==
All times are U.S. Eastern Daylight Time (UTC−4) (local times in parentheses)

=== Panama vs Guadeloupe ===
June 7, 2011
18:00

Panama	3–2	Guadeloupe
Pérez 29'; Tejada 31'; Gómez 57' (pen.)	Report	Jovial 65', 78'

Ford Field, Detroit
Attendance: 28,209
Referee: Marlon Mejía (El Salvador)

Panama	Guadeloupe

GK	1	Jaime Penedo
DF	23	Felipe Baloy (c)
DF	17	Luis Henríquez
DF	14	Eduardo Dasent
DF	13	Adolfo Machado	(substituted off) 82'
MF	6	Gabriel Gómez
MF	10	Nelson Barahona	(substituted off) 77'
MF	21	Amílcar Henríquez
MF	11	Armando Cooper
FW	18	Luis Tejada	(substituted off) 67'
FW	7	Blas Pérez
Substitutions:
FW	16	Luis Rentería	(substituted on) 67'
MF	19	Alberto Quintero	(substituted on) 77'
DF	3	Harold Cummings	(substituted on) 82'
Manager:
Julio Dely Valdés

GK	1	Franck Grandel	(yellow card) 73'
DF	2	Miguel Comminges
DF	13	Jean-Luc Lambourde
DF	22	Mickaël Tacalfred	(red card) 38'
DF	5	Eddy Viator
MF	7	Loïc Loval
MF	6	David Fleurival
MF	19	Stéphane Auvray (c)	(yellow card) 36'	(substituted off) 76'
MF	17	Cédric Collet		(substituted off) 59'
MF	14	Grégory Gendrey		(substituted off) 47'
FW	21	Richard Socrier	(yellow card) 89'
Substitutions:
FW	18	Brice Jovial		(substituted on) 47'
MF	12	Thomas Gamiette		(substituted on) 59'
MF	10	Therry Racon		(substituted on) 76'
Manager:
Roger Salnot

Assistant referees:
José Luis Camargo (Mexico)
Ainsley Rochard (Trinidad and Tobago)
Fourth official:
Marco Rodríguez (Mexico)

=== United States vs Canada ===
June 7, 2011
20:00

United States	2–0	Canada
Altidore 15'; Dempsey 62'	Report

Ford Field, Detroit
Attendance: 28,209
Referee: Walter López (Guatemala)

United States	Canada

GK	1	Tim Howard
RB	6	Steve Cherundolo
CB	21	Clarence Goodson
CB	15	Tim Ream
LB	3	Carlos Bocanegra (c)
CM	4	Michael Bradley	(yellow card) 51'
CM	13	Jermaine Jones		(substituted off) 79'
RW	10	Landon Donovan
LW	8	Clint Dempsey
CF	9	Juan Agudelo		(substituted off) 64'
CF	17	Jozy Altidore		(substituted off) 74'
Substitutions:
FW	11	Chris Wondolowski		(substituted on) 64'
MF	16	Sacha Kljestan		(substituted on) 74'
MF	7	Maurice Edu		(substituted on) 79'
Manager:
Bob Bradley

GK	1	Lars Hirschfeld
RB	2	Nikolas Ledgerwood
CB	4	Kevin McKenna (c)
CB	5	André Hainault
LB	19	Marcel de Jong
DM	13	Atiba Hutchinson
CM	8	Will Johnson	(yellow card) 52'	(substituted off) 65'
CM	7	Terry Dunfield		(substituted off) 82'
RW	14	Dwayne De Rosario		(substituted off) 81'
LW	11	Josh Simpson
CF	17	Simeon Jackson
Substitutions:
FW	10	Ali Gerba		(substituted on) 65'
FW	9	Rob Friend		(substituted on) 81'
MF	21	Jonathan Beaulieu-Bourgault		(substituted on) 82'
Manager:
(Trinidad and Tobago) Stephen Hart

Assistant referees:
Daniel Williamson (Guatemala)
Oscar Velasquez (Guatemala)
Fourth official:
Trevor Taylor (Barbados)

=== Canada vs Guadeloupe ===
June 11, 2011
18:00

Canada	1–0	Guadeloupe
De Rosario 51' (pen.)	Report

Raymond James Stadium, Tampa
Attendance: 27,731
Referee: Trevor Taylor (Barbados)

Canada	Guadeloupe

GK	18	Milan Borjan
RB	2	Nikolas Ledgerwood
CB	4	Kevin McKenna (c)
CB	5	André Hainault
LB	3	Mike Klukowski
CM	8	Will Johnson
CM	6	Julian de Guzman		(substituted off) 81'
CM	7	Terry Dunfield	(yellow card) 86'
RW	14	Dwayne De Rosario		(substituted off) 63'
LW	11	Josh Simpson
CF	10	Ali Gerba		(substituted off) 64'
Substitutions:
FW	17	Simeon Jackson		(substituted on) 63'
FW	9	Rob Friend		(substituted on) 64'
MF	12	Pedro Pacheco		(substituted on) 81'
Manager:
(Trinidad and Tobago) Stephen Hart

GK	1	Franck Grandel
DF	2	Miguel Comminges
DF	13	Jean-Luc Lambourde	(red card) 4'
DF	3	Stéphane Zubar	(yellow card) 49'
DF	5	Eddy Viator
MF	6	David Fleurival		(substituted off) 58'
MF	12	Thomas Gamiette
MF	19	Stéphane Auvray (c)
MF	10	Therry Racon		(substituted off) 65'
FW	21	Richard Socrier		(substituted off) 73'
FW	18	Brice Jovial
Substitutions:
FW	7	Loïc Loval		(substituted on) 58'
DF	15	Julien Ictoi		(substituted on) 65'
FW	11	Livio Nabab	(yellow card) 90'	(substituted on) 73'
Manager:
Roger Salnot

Assistant referees:
Adrian Goddard (Barbados)
Gerson Lopez (Guatemala)
Fourth official:
Marlon Mejía (El Salvador)

=== United States vs Panama ===
June 11, 2011
20:00

United States	1–2	Panama
Goodson 68'		Goodson 19' (o.g.); Gómez 36' (pen.)

Raymond James Stadium, Tampa
Attendance: 27,731
Referee: Marco Rodríguez (Mexico)

United States	Panama

GK	1	Tim Howard
DF	3	Carlos Bocanegra (c)	(yellow card) 90+3'
DF	21	Clarence Goodson	(yellow card) 56'	(substituted off) 78'
DF	6	Steve Cherundolo
DF	15	Tim Ream
MF	8	Clint Dempsey
MF	13	Jermaine Jones	(yellow card) 18'	(substituted off) 60'
MF	4	Michael Bradley
MF	10	Landon Donovan
FW	17	Jozy Altidore	(yellow card) 25'
FW	9	Juan Agudelo		(substituted off) 61'
Substitutions:
MF	16	Sacha Kljestan		(substituted on) 60'
MF	22	Alejandro Bedoya	(yellow card) 64'	(substituted on) 61'
FW	11	Chris Wondolowski		(substituted on) 78'
Manager:
Bob Bradley

GK	1	Jaime Penedo	(yellow card) 90+2'
DF	23	Felipe Baloy (c)
DF	17	Luis Henríquez
DF	5	Román Torres
DF	14	Eduardo Dasent
MF	6	Gabriel Gómez
MF	10	Nelson Barahona	(yellow card) 25'	(substituted off) 70'
MF	21	Amílcar Henríquez
MF	11	Armando Cooper		(substituted off) 84'
FW	18	Luis Tejada		(substituted off) 81'
FW	7	Blas Pérez
Substitutions:
MF	8	Gabriel Torres		(substituted on) 70'
MF	22	Eybir Bonaga		(substituted on) 81'
MF	19	Alberto Quintero		(substituted on) 84'
Manager:
Julio Dely Valdés

Assistant referees:
José Luis Camargo (Mexico)
Alberto Morín Méndez (Mexico)
Fourth official:
Jeffrey Solís (Costa Rica)

=== Canada vs Panama ===
June 14, 2011
19:00 (18:00 UTC−5)

Canada	1–1	Panama
De Rosario 62' (pen.)	Report	Tejada 90+1'

Livestrong Sporting Park, Kansas City
Attendance: 20,109
Referee: Walter López (Guatemala)

Canada	Panama

GK	18	Milan Borjan
DF	4	Kevin McKenna (c)
DF	5	André Hainault
DF	3	Mike Klukowski
MF	8	Will Johnson		(substituted off) 85'
MF	6	Julian de Guzman
MF	14	Dwayne De Rosario
MF	2	Nik Ledgerwood
MF	11	Josh Simpson	(yellow card) 51'	(substituted off) 73'
MF	7	Terry Dunfield	(yellow card) 58'
FW	17	Simeon Jackson
Substitutions:
FW	16	Tosaint Ricketts		(substituted on) 73'
MF	12	Pedro Pacheco		(substituted on) 85'
Manager:
(Trinidad and Tobago) Stephen Hart

GK	12	Luis Mejía
DF	23	Felipe Baloy (c)
DF	17	Luis Henríquez
DF	14	Eduardo Dasent
DF	13	Adolfo Machado
MF	15	Eric Davis
MF	6	Gabriel Gómez
MF	19	Alberto Quintero		(substituted off) 67'
MF	22	Eybir Bonaga	(yellow card) 61'	(substituted off) 79'
FW	7	Blas Pérez	(yellow card) 62'
FW	16	Luis Rentería		(substituted off) 71'
Substitutions:
MF	11	Armando Cooper		(substituted on) 67'
FW	18	Luis Tejada		(substituted on) 71'
MF	20	Aníbal Godoy		(substituted on) 79'
Manager:
Julio Dely Valdés

Assistant referees:
Gerson López (Guatemala)
Hermenerito Leal (Guatemala)
Fourth official:
Marco Rodríguez (Mexico)

=== Guadeloupe vs United States ===
June 14, 2011
21:00 (20:00 UTC−5)

Guadeloupe	0–1	United States
	Report	Altidore 9'

Livestrong Sporting Park, Kansas City
Attendance: 20,109
Referee: Jeffrey Solís (Costa Rica)

Guadeloupe	United States

GK	1	Franck Grandel
DF	3	Stéphane Zubar	(yellow card) 77'
DF	22	Mickaël Tacalfred
DF	5	Eddy Viator	(yellow card) 65'
DF	15	Julien Ictoi
MF	7	Loïc Loval		(substituted off) 26'
MF	12	Thomas Gamiette
MF	19	Stéphane Auvray (c)	(yellow card) 89'
MF	10	Therry Racon		(substituted off) 73'
FW	21	Richard Socrier
FW	11	Livio Nabab		(substituted off) 60'
Substitutions:
MF	17	Cédric Collet		(substituted on) 26'
MF	8	Dimitri Fautrai		(substituted on) 60'
FW	9	Ludovic Gotin		(substituted on) 73'
Manager:
Roger Salnot

GK	1	Tim Howard
DF	3	Carlos Bocanegra (c)
DF	21	Clarence Goodson
DF	14	Eric Lichaj
DF	6	Steve Cherundolo
MF	8	Clint Dempsey
MF	13	Jermaine Jones
MF	4	Michael Bradley	(substituted off) 85'
MF	10	Landon Donovan
FW	11	Chris Wondolowski	(substituted off) 64'
FW	17	Jozy Altidore	(substituted off) 78'
Substitutions:
FW	22	Alejandro Bedoya	(substituted on) 64'
FW	16	Sacha Kljestan	(substituted on) 78'
MF	7	Maurice Edu	(substituted on) 85'
Manager:
Bob Bradley

Assistant referees:
José Luis Camargo (Mexico)
Alberto Morín Méndez (Mexico)
Fourth official:
Marlon Mejía (El Salvador)

== 2013 CONCACAF Gold Cup ==
=== Group A ===
Pos	Team	Pld	W	D	L	GF	GA	GD	Pts	Qualification
1	Panama	3	2	1	0	3	1	+2	7	Advance to knockout stage
2	Mexico	3	2	0	1	6	3	+3	6	Advance to knockout stage
3	Martinique	3	1	0	2	2	4	−2	3	
4	Canada	3	0	1	2	0	3	−3	1	

July 7, 2013
17:30

Canada	0–1	Martinique
	Report	Reuperné 90+3'

Rose Bowl, Pasadena
Attendance: 56,822
Referee: Marcos Brea (Cuba)
July 7, 2013
20:00

Mexico	1–2	Panama
Fabián 45+2'	Report	G. Torres 7' (pen.), 48'

Rose Bowl, Pasadena
Attendance: 56,822
Referee: Wálter Quesada (Costa Rica)
July 11, 2013
20:30

Panama	1–0	Martinique
G. Torres 85' (pen.)	Report

CenturyLink Field, Seattle
Attendance: 28,354
Referee: Armando Castro (Honduras)
July 11, 2013
23:00

Mexico	2–0	Canada
R. Jiménez 42'; Fabián 57' (pen.)	Report

CenturyLink Field, Seattle
Attendance: 28,354
Referee: Joel Aguilar (El Salvador)
July 14, 2013
15:30

Panama	0–0	Canada
	Report

Sports Authority Field, Denver
Attendance: 30,000
Referee: Wálter Quesada (Costa Rica)
July 14, 2013
18:00

Martinique	1–3	Mexico
Parsemain 43' (pen.)	Report	Fabián 21'; Montes 34'; Ponce 90'

Sports Authority Field, Denver
Attendance: 30,000
Referee: Mark Geiger (United States)
July 7, 2013
17:30

Canada	0–1	Martinique
	Report	Reuperné 90+3'

Rose Bowl, Pasadena
Attendance: 56,822
Referee: Marcos Brea (Cuba)

July 11, 2013
23:00

Mexico	2–0	Canada
R. Jiménez 42'; Fabián 57' (pen.)	Report

CenturyLink Field, Seattle
Attendance: 28,354
Referee: Joel Aguilar (El Salvador)

July 14, 2013
15:30

Panama	0–0	Canada
	Report

Sports Authority Field, Denver
Attendance: 30,000
Referee: Wálter Quesada (Costa Rica)

== 2015 CONCACAF Gold Cup ==
=== Group B ===
Pos	Team	Pld	W	D	L	GF	GA	GD	Pts	Qualification
1	Jamaica	3	2	1	0	4	2	+2	7	Advance to knockout stage
2	Costa Rica	3	0	3	0	3	3	0	3	Advance to knockout stage
3	El Salvador	3	0	2	1	1	2	−1	2	
4	Canada (H)	3	0	2	1	0	1	−1	2	

Source: CONCACAF
(H) Hosts
July 8, 2015
22:30 (19:30 PDT)

El Salvador	0–0	Canada
	Report

StubHub Center, Carson
Attendance: 22,648
Referee: Óscar Moncada (Honduras)

July 11, 2015
18:30 (17:30 CDT)

Jamaica	1–0	Canada
Austin 90+2'	Report

BBVA Compass Stadium, Houston
Attendance: 22,017
Referee: Yadel Martínez (Cuba)

July 14, 2015
20:30

Canada	0–0	Costa Rica
	Report

BMO Field, Toronto
Attendance: 16,674
Referee: Héctor Rodríguez (Honduras)

== 2017 CONCACAF Gold Cup ==
=== Group A ===
Pos	Team	Pld	W	D	L	GF	GA	GD	Pts	Qualification
1	Costa Rica	3	2	1	0	5	1	+4	7	Advance to knockout stage
2	Canada	3	1	2	0	5	3	+2	5	Advance to knockout stage
3	Honduras	3	1	1	1	3	1	+2	4	Advance to knockout stage
4	French Guiana	3	0	0	3	2	10	−8	0	

Source: CONCACAF
July 7, 2017
19:00

French Guiana	2–4	Canada
Contout 69'; Privat 71'	Report	Jakovic 28'; Arfield 45+1'; Davies 60', 86'

Red Bull Arena, Harrison
Attendance: 25,817
Referee: John Pitti (Panama)

July 11, 2017
19:30
18:30 CDT (UTC−5)

Costa Rica	1–1	Canada
Calvo 42'	Report	Davies 26'

BBVA Compass Stadium, Houston
Attendance: 12,019
Referee: Mark Geiger (United States)

July 14, 2017
22:00
21:00 CDT (UTC−5)

Canada	0–0	Honduras
	Report

Toyota Stadium, Frisco
Attendance: 10,098
Referee: Joel Aguilar (El Salvador)

=== Quarter-finals ===
July 20, 2017
19:30
16:30 MST (UTC−7)

Jamaica	2–1	Canada
Francis 6'; Williams 50'	Report	Hoilett 61'

State Farm Stadium, Glendale
Attendance: 37,404
Referee: Ricardo Montero (Costa Rica)

== 2019 CONCACAF Gold Cup ==
=== Group A ===
Pos	Team	Pld	W	D	L	GF	GA	GD	Pts	Qualification
1	Mexico	3	3	0	0	13	3	+10	9	Advance to knockout stage
2	Canada	3	2	0	1	12	3	+9	6	Advance to knockout stage
3	Martinique	3	1	0	2	5	7	−2	3	
4	Cuba	3	0	0	3	0	17	−17	0	

Source: CONCACAF
15 June 2019
19:30 (16:30 UTC−7)

Canada	4–0	Martinique
David 33', 53'; Hoilett 63'; Arfield 67'	Report

Rose Bowl, Pasadena
Attendance: 65,527
Referee: Saíd Martínez (Honduras)

19 June 2019
22:30 (20:30 UTC−6)

Mexico	3–1	Canada
Alvarado 40'; Guardado 54', 77'	Report	Cavallini 75'

Broncos Stadium at Mile High, Denver
Attendance: 52,874
Referee: Henry Bejarano (Costa Rica)

23 June 2019
18:00

Canada	7–0	Cuba
David 3', 71', 77'; Cavallini 21', 43', 45+1'; Hoilett 50'	Report

Bank of America Stadium, Charlotte
Attendance: 59,283
Referee: Armando Villarreal (United States)

=== Quarter-finals ===
29 June 2019
19:00 (18:00 UTC−5)

Haiti	3–2	Canada
Nazon 50'; Bazile 70' (pen.); Guerrier 76'	Report	David 18'; Cavallini 28'

NRG Stadium, Houston
Attendance: 70,788
Referee: Jair Marrufo (United States)

== 2021 CONCACAF Gold Cup ==
=== Group B ===
Pos	Team	Pld	W	D	L	GF	GA	GD	Pts	Qualification
1	United States (H)	3	3	0	0	8	1	+7	9	Advance to knockout stage
2	Canada	3	2	0	1	8	3	+5	6	Advance to knockout stage
3	Haiti	3	1	0	2	3	6	−3	3	
4	Martinique	3	0	0	3	3	12	−9	0	

Source: CONCACAF
(H) Hosts
11 July 2021
18:30 (17:30 UTC−5)

Canada	4–1	Martinique
Larin 16'; Osorio 20'; Eustáquio 26'; Corbeanu 89'	Report	Rivière 10'

Children's Mercy Park, Kansas City
Attendance: 12,664
Referee: Iván Barton (El Salvador)

15 July 2021
19:30 (18:30 UTC−5)

Haiti	1–4	Canada
Lambese 56'	Report	Eustáquio 5'; Larin 51', 74' (pen.); Hoilett 79' (pen.)

Children's Mercy Park, Kansas City
Attendance: 7,511
Referee: Juan Gabriel Calderón (Costa Rica)

18 July 2021
17:00 (16:00 UTC−5)

United States	1–0	Canada
Moore 1'	Report

Children's Mercy Park, Kansas City
Attendance: 18,467
Referee: Adonai Escobedo (Mexico)

=== Quarter-finals ===
25 July 2021
19:00 (18:00 UTC−5)

Costa Rica	0–2	Canada
	Report	Hoilett 18'; Eustáquio 69'

AT&T Stadium, Arlington
Attendance: 41,318
Referee: Jair Marrufo (United States)

=== Semi-finals ===
29 July 2021
22:15 (21:15 UTC−5)

Mexico	2–1	Canada
Pineda 45+2' (pen.); Herrera 90+9'	Report	Buchanan 57'

NRG Stadium, Houston
Attendance: 70,304
Referee: Daneon Parchment (Jamaica)

== 2023 CONCACAF Gold Cup ==
=== Group B ===
Pos	Team	Pld	W	D	L	GF	GA	GD	Pts	Qualification
1	Guatemala	3	2	1	0	4	2	+2	7	Advance to knockout stage
2	Canada (H)	3	1	2	0	6	4	+2	5	Advance to knockout stage
3	Guadeloupe	3	1	1	1	8	6	+2	4	
4	Cuba	3	0	0	3	3	9	−6	0	

Source: CONCACAF
Rules for classification: Tiebreakers
(H) Co-host
June 27, 2023
19:00

Canada	2–2	Guadeloupe
Cavallini 49'; Lina 70' (o.g.)	Report	Ambrose 23'; Russell-Rowe 90+3' (o.g.)

BMO Field, Toronto
Attendance: 15,301
Referee: Rubiel Vazquez (United States)

July 1, 2023
21:30 (20:30 UTC-5)

Guatemala	0–0	Canada
	Report

Shell Energy Stadium, Houston
Attendance: 19,766
Referee: Marco Ortíz (Mexico)

July 4, 2023
18:30 (17:30 UTC-5)

Canada	4–2	Cuba
Hoilett 21' (pen.); Osorio 27'; Nelson 47'; Millar 62'	Report	Paradela 45+4' (pen.); Reyes 89' (pen.)

Shell Energy Stadium, Houston
Attendance: 20,002
Referee: Keylor Herrera (Costa Rica)

=== Quarter-finals ===
July 9, 2023
19:30

United States	2–2 (a.e.t.)	Canada
Vázquez 88'; Kennedy 114' (o.g.)	Report	Vitória 90+3' (pen.); Shaffelburg 109'
Penalties
Vázquez (penalty missed); Cowell (penalty scored); Busio (penalty scored); Ferreira (penalty scored)	3–2	(penalty missed) Vitória; (penalty missed) Fraser; (penalty scored) Miller; (penalty scored) Russell-Rowe; (penalty missed) Brym

TQL Stadium, Cincinnati
Attendance: 24,979
Referee: Marco Ortíz (Mexico)

== 2025 CONCACAF Gold Cup ==
=== Group B ===
Pos	Team	Pld	W	D	L	GF	GA	GD	Pts	Qualification
1	Canada (H)	3	2	1	0	9	1	+8	7	Advance to knockout stage
2	Honduras	3	2	0	1	4	7	−3	6	Advance to knockout stage
3	Curaçao	3	0	2	1	2	3	−1	2	
4	El Salvador	3	0	1	2	0	4	−4	1	

Source: CONCACAF
Rules for classification: Tiebreakers
(H) Co-host
June 17, 2025
22:30 (19:30 UTC−7)

Canada	6–0	Honduras
Sigur 27'; Oluwaseyi 45+2'; Buchanan 48', 65'; P. David 75'; Saliba 90'	Report

BC Place, Vancouver
Attendance: 24,286
Referee: Mario Escobar (Guatemala)

June 21, 2025
19:00 (18:00 UTC−5)

Curaçao	1–1	Canada
Antonisse 90+4'	Report	Saliba 9'

Shell Energy Stadium, Houston
Attendance: 20,536
Referee: Juan Gabriel Calderón (Costa Rica)

June 24, 2025
22:00 (21:00 UTC−5)

Canada	2–0	El Salvador
J. David 53'; Buchanan 56'	Report

Shell Energy Stadium, Houston
Attendance: 19,417
Referee: Joe Dickerson (United States)

=== Quarter-finals ===
June 29, 2025
16:00 (15:00 UTC−5)

Canada	1–1	Guatemala
J. David 30' (pen.)	Report	Rubin 69'
Penalties
P. David (penalty scored); Jebbison (penalty scored); Cornelius (penalty scored); Choinière (penalty scored); Larin (penalty missed); Saliba (penalty scored); De Fougerolles (penalty missed)	5–6	(penalty scored) Santis; (penalty scored) Samayoa; (penalty scored) Herrera; (penalty scored) Lom; (penalty missed) Pinto; (penalty scored) Altán; (penalty scored) Morales

U.S. Bank Stadium, Minneapolis
Attendance: 32,289
Referee: Keylor Herrera (Costa Rica)

== Top goalscorers ==
Three Canadians were awarded the Golden Boot for best goalscorer at a CONCACAF Gold Cup: Carlo Corazzin with four goals in 2000, Alphonso Davies with three goals in 2017, and Jonathan David with six goals in 2019.

Players in bold are still active with the national team.

Rank	Player	Goals	Gold Cup(s)
1	**Jonathan David**	8	2019 (6) and 2025 (2)
2	Dale Mitchell	7	1985 (4) and 1991 (3)
3	Dwayne De Rosario	6	2002 (1), 2007 (3) and 2011 (2)
3	Ali Gerba	6	2005 (1), 2007 (3) and 2009 (2)
3	**Junior Hoilett**	6	2017 (1), 2019 (2), 2021 (2) and 2023 (1)
3	**Lucas Cavallini**	6	2019 (5) and 2023 (1)
7	Tomasz Radzinski	5	1996 (1) and 2000 (4)
8	**Tajon Buchanan**	4	2021 (1) and 2025 (3)
9	Buzz Parsons	3	1977
9	Igor Vrablic	3	1985
9	Kevin McKenna	3	2002
9	**Alphonso Davies**	3	2017
9	**Stephen Eustáquio**	3	2021
9	**Cyle Larin**	3	2021

== See also ==
- Canada at the FIFA Confederations Cup
- Canada at the FIFA World Cup
- Canada at the Copa América
