= 2011 CONCACAF Gold Cup Group C =

Group C of the 2011 CONCACAF Gold Cup was one of three groups competing at the tournament. The group's first round of matches were played on June 7, with the final round played on June 14. All six group matches were played at venues in the United States, in Detroit, Tampa and Kansas City. The group consisted of host, and four time Gold Cup champions, United States, 2000 Gold Cup champion Canada, as well as Panama and Guadeloupe.

== Summary ==
The group opened on June 7 with Panama taking an early three-goal lead against Guadeloupe before Brice Jovial of Guadeloupe brought the match within a goal's reach. However, the Panamanians were able to withstand Guadeloupe's late pressure and win their opening fixture. Immediately after the match, group favorites Canada and the United States squared off. Analysts claimed that the Canadian squad was the strongest in their history, possibly the strongest since the mid-1980s squad that qualified for the 1986 FIFA World Cup. For the Americans, they had come off a humbling 4–0 defeat in a tune up match against defending World champions, Spain. In spite of the rough patch endured by the United States, they were still considered favorites to beat Canada. Thanks to an early, 15th-minute goal from Jozy Altidore, along with a complementary second half goal from Clint Dempsey gave the United States a 2–0 win over Canada and the lead in the group.

While Canada expectedly defeated Guadeloupe on June 11, Panama pulled off a stunning 2–1 upset over the United States, in which some cited as possibly the largest upset of the entire tournament. The match marked the first time in Gold Cup history that the United States lost on its home soil during Group Stage play. It was also the first time since the 1985 CONCACAF Championship, that the United States lost on home ground in a continental tournament. Clearance Goodson scored the lone goal for the United States in the 66th minute, after he conceded an own goal for the Panamanians in the 19th minute. Panama's Gabriel Gómez converted a penalty kick in the 33rd minute, which ended up being the winner.

The group wrapped up play on June 14 with Panama and Canada playing each other followed by Guadeloupe taking on the United States. The matches were a doubleheader held at Livestrong Sporting Park in Kansas City.

== Standings ==
Key to colors in group tables
Teams that advanced to the quarterfinals: Group winners; Group runners-up; Best two third-placed teams among all groups

Pos	Team	Pld	W	D	L	GF	GA	GD	Pts	Qualification
1	Panama	3	2	1	0	6	4	+2	7	Advance to knockout stage
2	United States	3	2	0	1	4	2	+2	6	Advance to knockout stage
3	Canada	3	1	1	1	2	3	−1	4	
4	Guadeloupe	3	0	0	3	2	5	−3	0	

Source: CONCACAF

== Matches ==
All times are U.S. Eastern Daylight Time (UTC−4) (local times in parentheses)

=== Panama vs Guadeloupe ===
June 7, 2011
18:00

Panama	3–2	Guadeloupe
Pérez 29'; Tejada 31'; Gómez 57' (pen.)	Report	Jovial 65', 78'

Ford Field, Detroit
Attendance: 28,209
Referee: Marlon Mejía (El Salvador)

Panama	Guadeloupe

GK	1	Jaime Penedo
DF	23	Felipe Baloy (c)
DF	17	Luis Henríquez
DF	14	Eduardo Dasent
DF	13	Adolfo Machado	(substituted off) 82'
MF	6	Gabriel Gómez
MF	10	Nelson Barahona	(substituted off) 77'
MF	21	Amílcar Henríquez
MF	11	Armando Cooper
FW	18	Luis Tejada	(substituted off) 67'
FW	7	Blas Pérez
Substitutions:
FW	16	Luis Rentería	(substituted on) 67'
MF	19	Alberto Quintero	(substituted on) 77'
DF	3	Harold Cummings	(substituted on) 82'
Manager:
Julio Dely Valdés

GK	1	Franck Grandel	(yellow card) 73'
DF	2	Miguel Comminges
DF	13	Jean-Luc Lambourde
DF	22	Mickaël Tacalfred	(red card) 38'
DF	5	Eddy Viator
MF	7	Loïc Loval
MF	6	David Fleurival
MF	19	Stéphane Auvray (c)	(yellow card) 36'	(substituted off) 76'
MF	17	Cédric Collet		(substituted off) 59'
MF	14	Grégory Gendrey		(substituted off) 47'
FW	21	Richard Socrier	(yellow card) 89'
Substitutions:
FW	18	Brice Jovial		(substituted on) 47'
MF	12	Thomas Gamiette		(substituted on) 59'
MF	10	Therry Racon		(substituted on) 76'
Manager:
Roger Salnot

Assistant referees:
José Luis Camargo (Mexico)
Ainsley Rochard (Trinidad and Tobago)
Fourth official:
Marco Rodríguez (Mexico)

=== United States vs Canada ===
June 7, 2011
20:00

United States	2–0	Canada
Altidore 15'; Dempsey 62'	Report

Ford Field, Detroit
Attendance: 28,209
Referee: Walter López (Guatemala)

United States	Canada

GK	1	Tim Howard
RB	6	Steve Cherundolo
CB	21	Clarence Goodson
CB	15	Tim Ream
LB	3	Carlos Bocanegra (c)
CM	4	Michael Bradley	(yellow card) 51'
CM	13	Jermaine Jones		(substituted off) 79'
RW	10	Landon Donovan
LW	8	Clint Dempsey
CF	9	Juan Agudelo		(substituted off) 64'
CF	17	Jozy Altidore		(substituted off) 74'
Substitutions:
FW	11	Chris Wondolowski		(substituted on) 64'
MF	16	Sacha Kljestan		(substituted on) 74'
MF	7	Maurice Edu		(substituted on) 79'
Manager:
Bob Bradley

GK	1	Lars Hirschfeld
RB	2	Nikolas Ledgerwood
CB	4	Kevin McKenna (c)
CB	5	André Hainault
LB	19	Marcel de Jong
DM	13	Atiba Hutchinson
CM	8	Will Johnson	(yellow card) 52'	(substituted off) 65'
CM	7	Terry Dunfield		(substituted off) 82'
RW	14	Dwayne De Rosario		(substituted off) 81'
LW	11	Josh Simpson
CF	17	Simeon Jackson
Substitutions:
FW	10	Ali Gerba		(substituted on) 65'
FW	9	Rob Friend		(substituted on) 81'
MF	21	Jonathan Beaulieu-Bourgault		(substituted on) 82'
Manager:
(Trinidad and Tobago) Stephen Hart

Assistant referees:
Daniel Williamson (Guatemala)
Oscar Velasquez (Guatemala)
Fourth official:
Trevor Taylor (Barbados)

=== Canada vs Guadeloupe ===
June 11, 2011
18:00

Canada	1–0	Guadeloupe
De Rosario 51' (pen.)	Report

Raymond James Stadium, Tampa
Attendance: 27,731
Referee: Trevor Taylor (Barbados)

Canada	Guadeloupe

GK	18	Milan Borjan
RB	2	Nikolas Ledgerwood
CB	4	Kevin McKenna (c)
CB	5	André Hainault
LB	3	Mike Klukowski
CM	8	Will Johnson
CM	6	Julian de Guzman		(substituted off) 81'
CM	7	Terry Dunfield	(yellow card) 86'
RW	14	Dwayne De Rosario		(substituted off) 63'
LW	11	Josh Simpson
CF	10	Ali Gerba		(substituted off) 64'
Substitutions:
FW	17	Simeon Jackson		(substituted on) 63'
FW	9	Rob Friend		(substituted on) 64'
MF	12	Pedro Pacheco		(substituted on) 81'
Manager:
(Trinidad and Tobago) Stephen Hart

GK	1	Franck Grandel
DF	2	Miguel Comminges
DF	13	Jean-Luc Lambourde	(red card) 4'
DF	3	Stéphane Zubar	(yellow card) 49'
DF	5	Eddy Viator
MF	6	David Fleurival		(substituted off) 58'
MF	12	Thomas Gamiette
MF	19	Stéphane Auvray (c)
MF	10	Therry Racon		(substituted off) 65'
FW	21	Richard Socrier		(substituted off) 73'
FW	18	Brice Jovial
Substitutions:
FW	7	Loïc Loval		(substituted on) 58'
DF	15	Julien Ictoi		(substituted on) 65'
FW	11	Livio Nabab	(yellow card) 90'	(substituted on) 73'
Manager:
Roger Salnot

Assistant referees:
Adrian Goddard (Barbados)
Gerson Lopez (Guatemala)
Fourth official:
Marlon Mejía (El Salvador)

=== United States vs Panama ===
June 11, 2011
20:00

United States	1–2	Panama
Goodson 68'		Goodson 19' (o.g.); Gómez 36' (pen.)

Raymond James Stadium, Tampa
Attendance: 27,731
Referee: Marco Rodríguez (Mexico)

United States	Panama

GK	1	Tim Howard
DF	3	Carlos Bocanegra (c)	(yellow card) 90+3'
DF	21	Clarence Goodson	(yellow card) 56'	(substituted off) 78'
DF	6	Steve Cherundolo
DF	15	Tim Ream
MF	8	Clint Dempsey
MF	13	Jermaine Jones	(yellow card) 18'	(substituted off) 60'
MF	4	Michael Bradley
MF	10	Landon Donovan
FW	17	Jozy Altidore	(yellow card) 25'
FW	9	Juan Agudelo		(substituted off) 61'
Substitutions:
MF	16	Sacha Kljestan		(substituted on) 60'
MF	22	Alejandro Bedoya	(yellow card) 64'	(substituted on) 61'
FW	11	Chris Wondolowski		(substituted on) 78'
Manager:
Bob Bradley

GK	1	Jaime Penedo	(yellow card) 90+2'
DF	23	Felipe Baloy (c)
DF	17	Luis Henríquez
DF	5	Román Torres
DF	14	Eduardo Dasent
MF	6	Gabriel Gómez
MF	10	Nelson Barahona	(yellow card) 25'	(substituted off) 70'
MF	21	Amílcar Henríquez
MF	11	Armando Cooper		(substituted off) 84'
FW	18	Luis Tejada		(substituted off) 81'
FW	7	Blas Pérez
Substitutions:
MF	8	Gabriel Torres		(substituted on) 70'
MF	22	Eybir Bonaga		(substituted on) 81'
MF	19	Alberto Quintero		(substituted on) 84'
Manager:
Julio Dely Valdés

Assistant referees:
José Luis Camargo (Mexico)
Alberto Morín Méndez (Mexico)
Fourth official:
Jeffrey Solís (Costa Rica)

=== Canada vs Panama ===
June 14, 2011
19:00 (18:00 UTC−5)

Canada	1–1	Panama
De Rosario 62' (pen.)	Report	Tejada 90+1'

Livestrong Sporting Park, Kansas City
Attendance: 20,109
Referee: Walter López (Guatemala)

Canada	Panama

GK	18	Milan Borjan
DF	4	Kevin McKenna (c)
DF	5	André Hainault
DF	3	Mike Klukowski
MF	8	Will Johnson		(substituted off) 85'
MF	6	Julian de Guzman
MF	14	Dwayne De Rosario
MF	2	Nik Ledgerwood
MF	11	Josh Simpson	(yellow card) 51'	(substituted off) 73'
MF	7	Terry Dunfield	(yellow card) 58'
FW	17	Simeon Jackson
Substitutions:
FW	16	Tosaint Ricketts		(substituted on) 73'
MF	12	Pedro Pacheco		(substituted on) 85'
Manager:
(Trinidad and Tobago) Stephen Hart

GK	12	Luis Mejía
DF	23	Felipe Baloy (c)
DF	17	Luis Henríquez
DF	14	Eduardo Dasent
DF	13	Adolfo Machado
MF	15	Eric Davis
MF	6	Gabriel Gómez
MF	19	Alberto Quintero		(substituted off) 67'
MF	22	Eybir Bonaga	(yellow card) 61'	(substituted off) 79'
FW	7	Blas Pérez	(yellow card) 62'
FW	16	Luis Rentería		(substituted off) 71'
Substitutions:
MF	11	Armando Cooper		(substituted on) 67'
FW	18	Luis Tejada		(substituted on) 71'
MF	20	Aníbal Godoy		(substituted on) 79'
Manager:
Julio Dely Valdés

Assistant referees:
Gerson López (Guatemala)
Hermenerito Leal (Guatemala)
Fourth official:
Marco Rodríguez (Mexico)

=== Guadeloupe vs United States ===
June 14, 2011
21:00 (20:00 UTC−5)

Guadeloupe	0–1	United States
	Report	Altidore 9'

Livestrong Sporting Park, Kansas City
Attendance: 20,109
Referee: Jeffrey Solís (Costa Rica)

Guadeloupe	United States

GK	1	Franck Grandel
DF	3	Stéphane Zubar	(yellow card) 77'
DF	22	Mickaël Tacalfred
DF	5	Eddy Viator	(yellow card) 65'
DF	15	Julien Ictoi
MF	7	Loïc Loval		(substituted off) 26'
MF	12	Thomas Gamiette
MF	19	Stéphane Auvray (c)	(yellow card) 89'
MF	10	Therry Racon		(substituted off) 73'
FW	21	Richard Socrier
FW	11	Livio Nabab		(substituted off) 60'
Substitutions:
MF	17	Cédric Collet		(substituted on) 26'
MF	8	Dimitri Fautrai		(substituted on) 60'
FW	9	Ludovic Gotin		(substituted on) 73'
Manager:
Roger Salnot

GK	1	Tim Howard
DF	3	Carlos Bocanegra (c)
DF	21	Clarence Goodson
DF	14	Eric Lichaj
DF	6	Steve Cherundolo
MF	8	Clint Dempsey
MF	13	Jermaine Jones
MF	4	Michael Bradley	(substituted off) 85'
MF	10	Landon Donovan
FW	11	Chris Wondolowski	(substituted off) 64'
FW	17	Jozy Altidore	(substituted off) 78'
Substitutions:
FW	22	Alejandro Bedoya	(substituted on) 64'
FW	16	Sacha Kljestan	(substituted on) 78'
MF	7	Maurice Edu	(substituted on) 85'
Manager:
Bob Bradley

Assistant referees:
José Luis Camargo (Mexico)
Alberto Morín Méndez (Mexico)
Fourth official:
Marlon Mejía (El Salvador)
