= Guadeloupe at the CONCACAF Gold Cup =

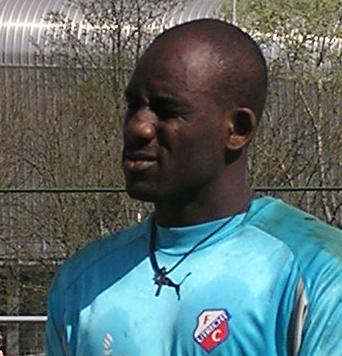
Franck Grandel represented Guadeloupe at two CONCACAF Gold Cups and was voted Best Goalkeeper of the tournament in 2007.

The CONCACAF Gold Cup is North America's major tournament in senior men's football and determines the continental champion. Until 1989, the tournament was known as CONCACAF Championship. It is currently held every two years. From 1996 to 2005, nations from other confederations have regularly joined the tournament as invitees. In earlier editions, the continental championship was held in different countries, but since the inception of the Gold Cup in 1991, the United States are constant hosts or co-hosts.

From 1973 to 1989, the tournament doubled as the confederation's World Cup qualification. CONCACAF's representative team at the FIFA Confederations Cup was decided by a play-off between the winners of the last two tournament editions in 2015 via the CONCACAF Cup, but was then discontinued along with the Confederations Cup.

Since the inaugural tournament in 1963, the Gold Cup was held 28 times and has been won by seven different nations, most often by Mexico (13 titles).

Guadeloupe did not participate in the Championships before 1991. As CONCACAF members but not FIFA members, they have since played in the Caribbean Cup and CONCACAF Nations League which doubled as Gold Cup qualifiers. In seventeen attempts, Guadeloupe qualified five times, back-to-back in 2007, 2009 and 2011, and again in 2021 and 2023. They would reach the knockout stage on two of these occasions.

Because they are not FIFA members, Guadeloupe were not able to represent CONCACAF at a FIFA Confederations Cup, even if they had won the tournament. Their non-affiliation also enabled them to recruit former French international Jocelyn Angloma for their squad in 2007.

== Overall record ==
CONCACAF Gold Cup record
Year	Result	Position	Pld	W	D	L	GF	GA
(United States) 1991	Did not qualify							
(Mexico) (United States) 1993	Did not qualify							
(United States) 1996	Did not qualify							
(United States) 1998	Did not enter							
(United States) 2000	Did not qualify							
(United States) 2002	Did not qualify							
(Mexico) (United States) 2003	Did not qualify							
(United States) 2005	Did not qualify							
(United States) 2007	Semi-finals	4th	5	2	1	2	5	5
(United States) 2009	Quarter-finals	6th	4	2	0	2	5	8
(United States) 2011	Group stage	10th	3	0	0	3	2	5
(United States) 2013	Did not qualify							
(Canada) (United States) 2015	Did not qualify							
(United States) 2017	Did not qualify							
(Costa Rica) (Jamaica) (United States) 2019	Did not qualify							
(United States) 2021	Group stage	14th	3	0	0	3	3	7
(Canada) (United States) 2023	Group stage	9th	3	1	1	1	8	6
(Canada) (United States) 2025	Group stage	16th	3	0	0	3	5	10
Total	6/18	0 Titles	21	5	2	14	28	41

== Match overview ==
Tournament	Round	Opponent	Score	Venue
(United States) 2007	Group stage	Haiti	1–1	Miami
(United States) 2007	Group stage	Canada	2–1	Miami
(United States) 2007	Group stage	Costa Rica	0–1	Miami
(United States) 2007	Quarter-finals	Honduras	2–1	Houston
(United States) 2007	Semi-finals	Mexico	0–1	Chicago
(United States) 2009	Group stage	Panama	2–1	Oakland
(United States) 2009	Group stage	Nicaragua	2–0	Houston
(United States) 2009	Group stage	Mexico	0–2	Glendale
(United States) 2009	Quarter-finals	Costa Rica	1–5	Arlington
(United States) 2011	Group stage	Panama	2–3	Detroit
(United States) 2011	Group stage	Canada	0–1	Tampa
(United States) 2011	Group stage	United States	0–1	Kansas City
(United States) 2021	Group stage	Costa Rica	1–3	Orlando
(United States) 2021	Group stage	Jamaica	1–2	Orlando
(United States) 2021	Group stage	Suriname	1–2	Houston
(Canada) (United States) 2023	Group stage	Canada	2–2	Toronto
(Canada) (United States) 2023	Group stage	Cuba	4–1	Houston
(Canada) (United States) 2023	Group stage	Guatemala	2–3	Harrison
(Canada) (United States) 2025	Group stage	Panama	2–5	Carson
(Canada) (United States) 2025	Group stage	Jamaica	1–2	San Jose
(Canada) (United States) 2025	Group stage	Guatemala	2–3	Houston

== Record players ==
Rank	Player	Matches	Gold Cups
1	Stéphane Auvray	12	2007, 2009 and 2011
2	Loïc Loval	11	2007, 2009 and 2011
3	Miguel Comminges	10	2007, 2009 and 2011
3	David Fleurival	10	2007, 2009 and 2011
3	Mickaël Tacalfred	10	2007, 2009 and 2011
6	Alain Vertot	8	2007 and 2009
6	Franck Grandel	8	2007 and 2011
6	Richard Socrier	8	2007 and 2011
9	Aurélien Capoue	7	2007 and 2009
9	Jean-Luc Lambourde	7	2007, 2009 and 2011
9	Thomas Gamiette	7	2009 and 2011
9	Eddy Viator	7	2009 and 2011

== Top goalscorers ==
Rank	Player	Goals	Gold Cups
1	Jocelyn Angloma	2	2007
1	David Fleurival	2	2007 and 2009
1	Brice Jovial	2	2011
4	Cédrick Fiston	1	2007
4	Richard Socrier	1	2007
4	Alexandre Alphonse	1	2009
4	Stéphane Auvray	1	2009
4	Ludovic Gotin	1	2009
4	Loïc Loval	1	2009
