= 2011 CONCACAF Gold Cup final =

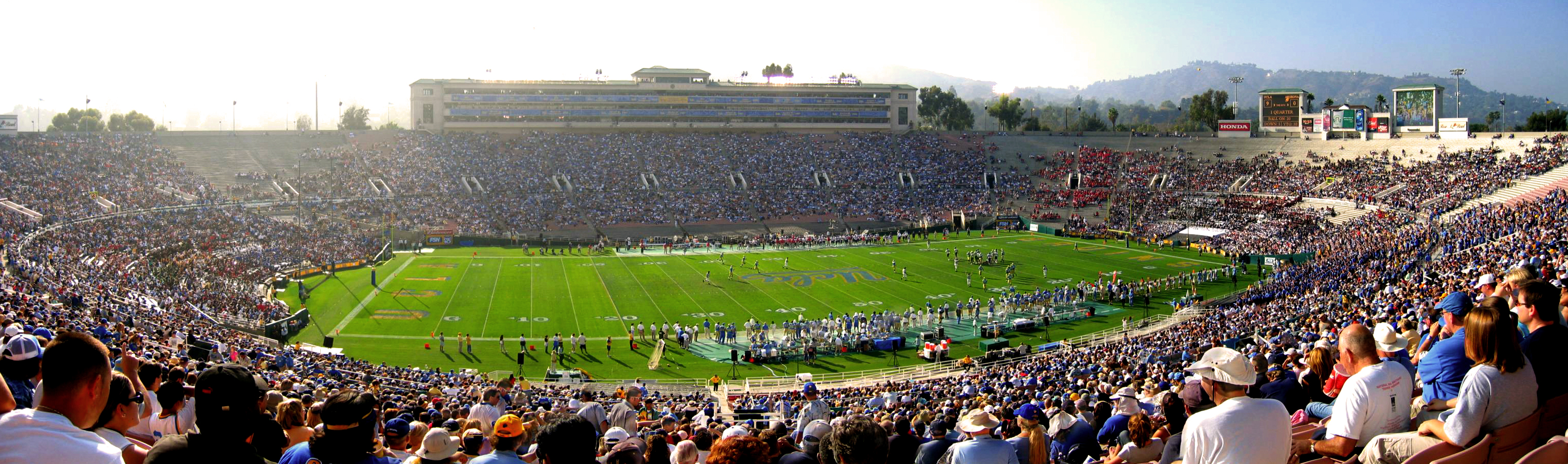
- Event: 2011 CONCACAF Gold Cup
United States	Mexico
(United States)	(Mexico)
2	4
- Date: June 25, 2011
- Venue: Rose Bowl, Pasadena
- Referee: Joel Aguilar (El Salvador)
- Attendance: 93,420
- Weather: Sunny, 82 °F (28 °C)

The 2011 CONCACAF Gold Cup final was the 11th final of the CONCACAF Gold Cup, the international championship tournament for teams of the CONCACAF, the governing body of soccer in North and Central America. The match took place on June 25, 2011, and took place at the Rose Bowl in Pasadena, California, United States. For the third consecutive final, the United States and Mexico contested the final, Mexico being the defending champions. The final was Mexico's seventh in Gold Cup history, while it was the United States' eighth final, and their fourth consecutive final.

For the second straight year, Mexico defended their Gold Cup title against the United States, defeating them 4–2 in the final, overcoming a two-goal deficit. Mexico's Pablo Barrera netted Mexico's first and third goals, while Andrés Guardado and Giovani dos Santos tallied the second and fourth goals, respectively. Michael Bradley and Landon Donovan scored the United States' two goals in the match. The loss marked only the second time in 12 years the United States lost to Mexico on home soil. As Gold Cup champions, Mexico earned a spot at the 2013 FIFA Confederations Cup in Brazil as the CONCACAF's representative.

== Route to the final ==
United States
Round
Mexico
Opponent
Result
Group stage
Opponent
Result
Canada
2–0
Match 1
El Salvador
5–0
Panama
1–2
Match 2
Cuba
5–0
Guadeloupe
1–0
Match 3
Costa Rica
4–1

Team	Pld	W	D	L	GF	GA	GD	Pts
Panama	3	2	1	0	6	4	+2	7
United States	3	2	0	1	4	2	+2	6
Canada	3	1	1	1	2	3	−1	4
Guadeloupe	3	0	0	3	2	5	−3	0

Final standing

Team	Pld	W	D	L	GF	GA	GD	Pts
Mexico	3	3	0	0	14	1	+13	9
Costa Rica	3	1	1	1	7	5	+2	4
El Salvador	3	1	1	1	7	7	0	4
Cuba	3	0	0	3	1	16	−15	0

Opponent
Result
Knockout stage
Opponent
Result
Jamaica
2–0
Quarterfinals
Guatemala
2–1
Panama
1–0
Semifinals
Honduras
2–0 (a.e.t.)

=== Mexico ===
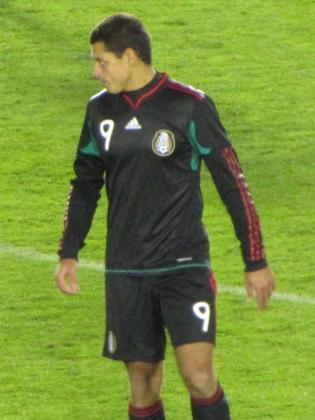
Mexico's Javier Hernández, commonly known as "Chicharito", earned the Golden Boot and MVP award, with seven goals in the tournament.

Drawn into Group A of the Gold Cup, Mexico started their tournament campaign on June 5, 2011, against El Salvador.

Prior to their second Group Stage match against Cuba, it was revealed that five players on the Mexican squad, Sinha, Christian Bermúdez, Édgar Dueñas, Maza Rodríguez and Guillermo Ochoa, all tested positive for clenbuterol. The five players were subsequently suspended from the Gold Cup squad and sent home. Although testing positive for the substance, Mexican officials believed the drug was inadvertently taken, claiming that positive test results were caused by eating meat tainted with the drug. Later that same day, in spite of being shorthanded, Mexico still earned their second win of the tournament against Cuba, again winning by a 5–0 scoreline. Both Javier Hernández and Giovani dos Santos netted twice for Mexico, while Aldo de Nigris scored within a minute of being substituted into the game.

The following day, CONCACAF General Secretary Chuck Blazer had scheduled a meeting of the confederation's national teams committee, which also serves as the organizing committee of the Gold Cup, was to be convened to consider the doping situation, including possibly allowing Mexico to replace the five suspended players. However, the meeting was postponed to allow for more information to be gathered.

Still with no conclusion from CONCACAF, the Mexican team finished out their group play on June 12 with a 4–1 victory over Costa Rica. All four of Mexico's goals were scored within the first half of play and came from four players.

On June 14, the Mexican Football Federation said that the "B" samples of those five involving players were negative.

As Group A winners, Mexico played Group B third-place finishers, Guatemala on June 18. Narrowly edging Canada on goal difference, Guatemala earned a berth in the quarterfinals thanks to a 4–0 victory over Grenada. In the fifth minute of play, Guatemala's Carlos Ruiz opened the scoring to give Los Chapines a 1–0 lead. For Mexico, it was the first time in the entire tournament they found themselves trailing their opposition. Three minutes into the second half, de Nigris scored for Mexico, tying the match at 1–1. Twenty minutes later, Hernández netted the match winning goal, to give Mexico a berth into the semifinals.

The following day, the Gold Cup Organizing Committee announced on June 19 that Mexico will be allowed to replace the suspended players. The replacements were able to travel in time for El Tri's semifinal fixture against Honduras.

With the semifinal match between the United States and Panama beforehand, it was determined that the winner of the match would play the United States in the Gold Cup final. Scoreless through regulation time, Mexico and Honduras had to play through a 30-minute extra time. Within the first two minutes, Mexico would score twice, to lift them to a 2–0 lead. Again, it was de Nigris and Hernandez who would score for El Tri, both of whom scored in the same respective fashion as they did against Guatemala. Mexico was able to hold the two-goal advantage through the remainder of the first extra time period and the entire second period, giving them a third straight berth into the final.

=== United States ===
The Gold Cup hosts were drawn into Group C, along with Panama, Canada, and Guadeloupe.

Being the last group to commence group play, the Gold Cup hosts opened this phase of the tournament on June 7, 2011, against Canada at Ford Field in Detroit. In front of a crowd of 29,000 the United States scored a pair of goals, each coming in different halves, giving the hosts a 2–0 victory over Canada. The United States' Jozy Altidore opened the scoring in the 15th minute, when he made a breakaway deep into the penalty box, slotted a shot underneath Canadian goalkeeper, Lars Hirschfeld. In the second half of play, a 62nd-minute goal from Clint Dempsey gave the United States the 2–0 lead, which would be their opening win of group play.

Four days later, the United States suffered a setback in group play when they suffered a 1–2 defeat to Panama at Raymond James Stadium in Tampa. With all the goals coming in the first half of play, Panama opened the score sheet at the virtue of an own goal in the 19th minute from Clarence Goodson. In the 36th minute, a penalty kick was ruled by the official, Marco Antonio Rodríguez, allowing Panama's Gabriel Gómez to double Panama's lead. Their two-goal lead was cut in half through the United States' Goodson, who headed a Landon Donovan corner kick in the 68th minute, bringing the U.S. within a goal. The Panamanians were able to weather wave upon wave of attacks from the Americans, earning the 2–1 victory. The loss, was their United States' first group stage loss in Gold Cup history. With Canada earning a 1–0 victory against Guadeloupe, the United States found themselves narrowly ahead of Canada for second place in the group, only ousting Canada through goal differential.

Although the odds of the United States failing to make the knockout round were slim, even if the squad lost to Guadeloupe, a win in their final group match was necessary for the team to advance into the quarterfinals. Held at Livestrong Sporting Park in Kansas City on June 14, 2011, Guadeloupe's Stéphane Auvray had a shot deflect off the post in the 4th minute of play. Despite the early wave of attacking from Guadeloupe, the United States scored on their first shot on goal, thanks to a 10th minute shot from Alitdore, who scored from 25 yards out. The early goal ended up being the lone goal of the match. With Panama drawing 1–1 against Canada, the United States advanced to the quarterfinals as group runners-up, for the first time in Gold Cup history.

A week later, on June 19, 2011, the United States played Group B winners, Jamaica in the quarterfinals. The Jamaican team was considered by the media to be one of the strongest teams since the team that earned a World Cup berth in 1998. In group play, Jamaica posted a 3–0–0 record, scoring seven times and not conceding any goals. Their most notable wins included a 2–0 blanking of CONCACAF powerhouse, Honduras and 4–0 thrashing of Grenada. Some even considered Jamaica the match favorites, with Jamaica's high form and the United States' poorer form. Nevertheless, the United States blanked Jamaica in the quarterfinals, and earned a 2–0 victory. In front of a sold-out crowd at RFK Stadium in Washington, D.C., the U.S. scored in the 49th minute from own goal and a 79th-minute goal from Dempsey. Following the match, Panama and El Salvador played on another where the Panamians booked a second date against the United States in the tournament.

Seeking redemption, the United States were able to do so when playing against Panama in the semifinals of the tournament. Played on June 22, 2011, at Reliant Stadium in Houston, the two sides remained gridlocked well through the second half. Dempsey, was able to score a late goal off of a Donovan cross to give the U.S. a 1–0 lead, which ended up becoming the match-winning goal.

== Match details ==
June 25, 2011
21:00 (18:00 UTC−7)

United States	2–4	Mexico
Bradley 8'; Donovan 23'	Report	Barrera 29', 49'; Guardado 36'; Dos Santos 76'

Rose Bowl, Pasadena
Attendance: 93,420
Referee: Joel Aguilar (El Salvador)

United States	Mexico

GK	1	Tim Howard
RB	6	Steve Cherundolo		(substituted off) 11'
CB	3	Carlos Bocanegra (c)
CB	21	Clarence Goodson
LB	14	Eric Lichaj
DM	13	Jermaine Jones	(yellow card) 90'
CM	4	Michael Bradley
CM	22	Alejandro Bedoya		(substituted off) 63'
RW	10	Landon Donovan	(yellow card) 33'
LW	8	Clint Dempsey	(yellow card) 87'
CF	20	Freddy Adu		(substituted off) 86'
Substitutions:
DF	12	Jonathan Bornstein		(substituted on) 11'
FW	9	Juan Agudelo		(substituted on) 63'
MF	16	Sacha Kljestan		(substituted on) 86'
Manager:
Bob Bradley

GK	12	Alfredo Talavera
RB	16	Efraín Juárez
CB	4	Rafael Márquez (c)		(substituted off) 43'
CB	15	Héctor Moreno
LB	3	Carlos Salcido		(substituted off) 28'
DM	6	Gerardo Torrado
CM	8	Israel Castro
CM	18	Andrés Guardado
RW	7	Pablo Barrera		(substituted off) 75'
LW	10	Giovani dos Santos
CF	14	Javier Hernández
Substitutions:
DF	20	Jorge Torres Nilo	(yellow card) 81'	(substituted on) 28'
DF	2	Héctor Reynoso		(substituted on) 43'
MF	13	Jesús Zavala		(substituted on) 75'
Manager:
José Manuel de la Torre

Assistant referees:
Héctor Vergara (Canada)
William Torres (El Salvador)
Fourth official:
Walter López (Guatemala)
