= Canada at the Copa América =

South American senior men's soccer tournament

The Copa América is South America's major tournament in senior men's soccer and determines the continental champion. Until 1967, the tournament was known as South American Championship. It is the oldest continental championship in the world.

Canada is not a member of the South American Football Confederation (CONMEBOL). But because CONMEBOL only has ten member associations, guest nations have regularly been invited since 1993.

Canada was initially invited for the 2001 Copa América due to their championship at the 2000 CONCACAF Gold Cup. Unfortunately, the tournament was cancelled due to security issues in Colombia ten days before the tournament. CONMEBOL reversed their decision five days later and allowed the competition to go ahead, but the Canadian Soccer Association decided against participating after the initial cancellation.

Canada were eligible to qualify for the Copa América Centenario in 2016 through the 2015 CONCACAF Gold Cup, but did not make it past the group stage.

Prior to the 2024 Copa América, it was announced that CONCACAF teams could qualify through placement in the 2023–24 CONCACAF Nations League. After a quarter-final exit in the Nations League, Canada qualified for their first ever Copa América tournament following a win against Trinidad and Tobago in the qualifying play-offs on March 23, 2024. Canada finished fourth in their Copa América debut.

== Summary ==
Copa América record										Qualification record					
Year	Result	Position	Pld	W	D	L	GF	GA	Squad	Pld	W	D	L	GF	GA
(Argentina) 1916 to (Paraguay) 1999	Not invited									Not invited					
(Colombia) 2001	Originally invited but withdrew								Squad	Invited as CONCACAF champions (Note: During Canada's 2000 CONCACAF Gold Cup campaign (including the qualifying play-offs), Canada accumulated a record of 5 wins, 3 draws, and 0 losses. These matches are not included in the total.)					
(Peru) 2004	Not invited									Not invited					
(Venezuela) 2007	Not invited									Not invited					
(Uruguay) 2011	Not invited									Not invited					
(Chile) 2015	Not invited									Not invited					
(United States) 2016	Did not qualify									3 (Note: Includes matches at the 2015 CONCACAF Gold Cup)	0	2	1	0	1
(Brazil) 2019	Not invited														
(Brazil) 2021	Not invited														
(United States) 2024	Fourth place	4th	6	1	3	2	4	7	Squad	3 (Note: Includes 2023–24 CONCACAF Nations League A matches and a qualifying play-off match)	2	0	1	6	4
Total	Fourth place	4th	6	1	3	2	4	7	–	6	2	2	2	6	5

*Note: Draws include matches decided via penalty shoot-out.

== 2024 Copa América ==
=== Group stage ===
Pos	Team	Pld	W	D	L	GF	GA	GD	Pts	Qualification
1	Argentina	3	3	0	0	5	0	+5	9	Advance to knockout stage
2	Canada	3	1	1	1	1	2	−1	4	Advance to knockout stage
3	Chile	3	0	2	1	0	1	−1	2	
4	Peru	3	0	1	2	0	3	−3	1	

Source: CONMEBOL
Rules for classification: Tiebreakers
June 20, 2024
8:00 pm EDT (UTC−4)

Argentina	2–0	Canada
Alvarez 49'; La. Martínez 88'	Report (CONMEBOL); Report (CONCACAF)

Mercedes-Benz Stadium, Atlanta, Georgia
Attendance: 70,564
Referee: Jesús Valenzuela (Venezuela)

June 25, 2024
5:00 pm CDT (UTC−5)

Peru	0–1	Canada
	Report (CONMEBOL); Report (CONCACAF)	David 74'

Children's Mercy Park, Kansas City, Kansas
Attendance: 15,625
Referee: Mario Escobar (Guatemala)

June 29, 2024
8:00 pm EDT (UTC−4)

Canada	0–0	Chile
	Report (CONMEBOL); Report (CONCACAF)

Inter&Co Stadium, Orlando, Florida
Attendance: 24,481
Referee: Wilmar Roldán (Colombia)

=== Knockout stage ===
Quarter-finals

July 5, 2024
8:00 pm CDT (UTC−5)

Venezuela	1–1	Canada
Rondón 65'	Report (CONMEBOL); Report (CONCACAF)	Shaffelburg 13'
Penalties
Rondón (penalty scored); Herrera (penalty missed); Rincón (penalty scored); Savarino (penalty missed); Cádiz (penalty scored); Ángel (penalty missed)	3–4	(penalty scored) David; (penalty missed) Millar; (penalty scored) Bombito; (penalty missed) Eustáquio; (penalty scored) Davies; (penalty scored) Koné

AT&T Stadium, Arlington, Texas
Attendance: 51,080
Referee: Wilton Sampaio (Brazil)

Semi-finals

July 9, 2024
8:00 pm EDT (UTC−4)

Argentina	2–0	Canada
Alvarez 22'; Messi 51'	Report (CONMEBOL); Report (CONCACAF)

MetLife Stadium, East Rutherford, New Jersey
Attendance: 80,102
Referee: Piero Maza (Chile)

Third place play-off

July 13, 2024
8:00 pm EDT (UTC−4)

Canada	2–2	Uruguay
Koné 22'; David 80'	Report (CONMEBOL); Report (CONCACAF)	Bentancur 8'; Suárez 90+2'
Penalties
David (penalty scored); Bombito (penalty scored); Koné (penalty missed); Choinière (penalty scored); Davies (penalty missed)	3–4	(penalty scored) Valverde; (penalty scored) Bentancur; (penalty scored) De Arrascaeta; (penalty scored) Suárez

Bank of America Stadium, Charlotte, North Carolina
Attendance: 24,386
Referee: Alexis Herrera (Venezuela)

== Top goalscorers ==
As of July 13, 2024

Player	Goals	2024
Jonathan David	2	2
Ismaël Koné	1	1
Jacob Shaffelburg	1	1
Total	4	4

== See also ==
- Canada at the FIFA World Cup
- Canada at the CONCACAF Gold Cup
