= Roger Salnot =

Guadeloupean football manager

- Born: 10 December 1958 (age 67); Guadeloupe, France
- Occupation: Football Coach

Roger Salnot (born 10 December 1958 in Guadeloupe, France) is a football coach who managed the Guadeloupe national football team from 2001 to 2011.

== Coaching career ==
In 2007, Salnot led the team to finish in fourth place of the Digicel Caribbean Cup 2007. In the first round, Guadeloupe advanced as leader of Group F, alongside the other French department, Martinique. In the stage two, the team finished second in Group H behind Guyana. After losing to Haiti in the tournament semifinals, Guadeloupe lost to Cuba in the third place playoff game and finished fourth.

Guadeloupe was a surprise qualifier for the 2007 CONCACAF Gold Cup. Salnot's team continued their strong play throughout the year at the Gold Cup. Their success was so surprising because it was their first major international tournament. They started out by tying 1-1 to the strong Caribbean team of Haiti, followed by a 2-1 win over Canada and finally succumbing 1-0 to the reigning champions of Central America, Costa Rica. Guadeloupe advanced to the quarterfinals as the best performing 3rd place team in group play. In the quarterfinals, they shocked one of the most outstanding teams in the tournament, Honduras, by defeating them 2-1, with goals of Jocelyn Angloma and Richard Socrier. After that impressive win, Salnot and his team lost 0-1 in the semifinal against Mexico with a curling shot from 30 yards of Pavel Pardo. At the end of the tournament, Franck Grandel was named the best goalkeeper of the Gold Cup and Jocelyn Angloma was an Honorable Mention.

In the 2009 CONCACAF Gold Cup, Guadeloupe tried to repeat and improve on their last Gold cup outing of the last edition, Salnot hired Angloma as his assistant coach.
