= Miguel Comminges =

Guadeloupean footballer (born 1982)

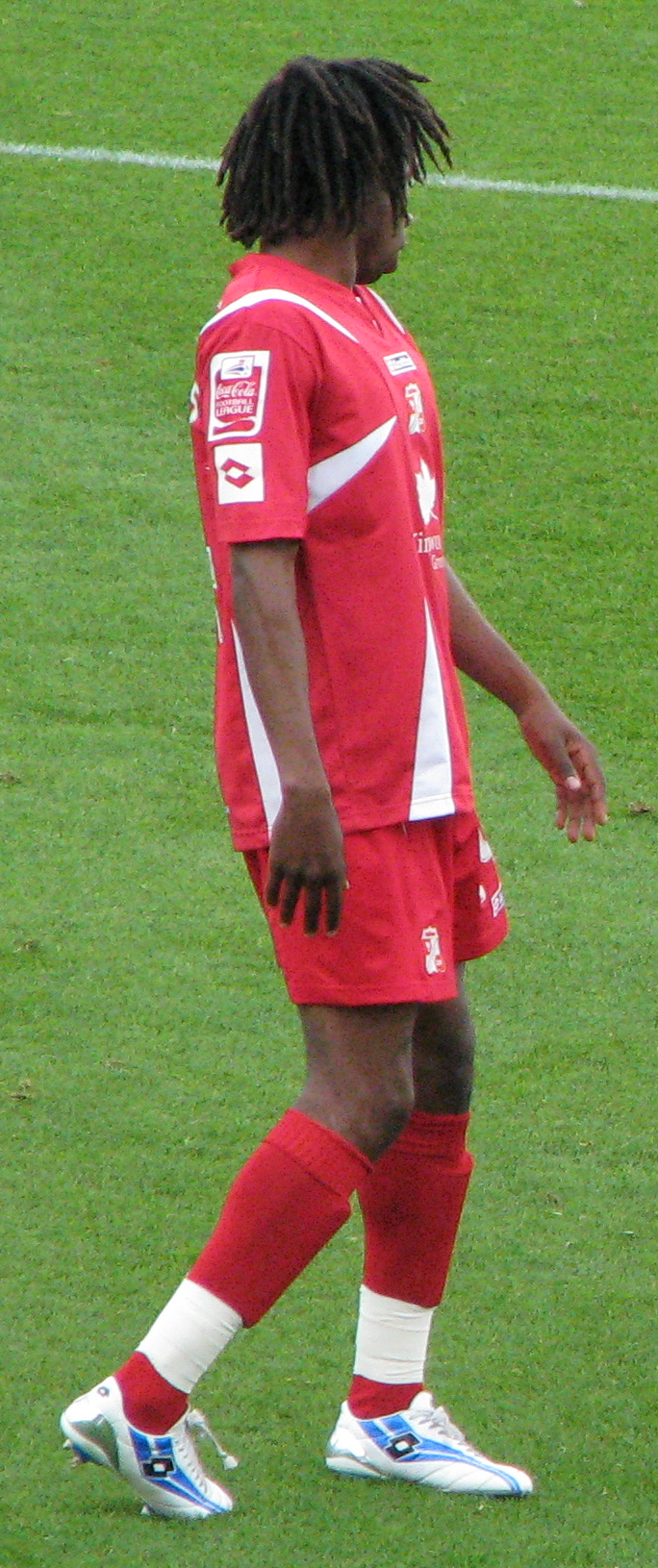
- Comminges playing for Swindon Town in 2007

Personal information
- Full name: Miguel Gregory Comminges
- Date of birth: 16 March 1982 (age 44)
- Place of birth: Les Abymes, Guadeloupe, France
- Height: 5 ft 8 in (1.73 m)
- Position: Defender

Youth career
- Rapid Club Petit-Canal

Senior career*
Years	Team	Apps	(Gls)
2002–2003	Amiens	14	(0)
2003–2007	Reims	74	(0)
2007–2008	Swindon Town	40	(0)
2008–2011	Cardiff City	31	(0)
2010	→ Carlisle United (loan)	0	(0)
2011	Southend United	7	(0)
2011	Colorado Rapids	4	(0)
2012–2013	Stevenage	21	(0)
Total		191	(0)

International career^{‡}
2007–2011	Guadeloupe	15	(0)
- * Club domestic league appearances and goals as of 20 May 2013 ‡ National team caps and goals as of 22 July 2011

Miguel Gregory Comminges (born 16 March 1982) is a Guadeloupean former professional footballer. Having spent his career in France, England, Wales, and the United States, he played for the Guadeloupe national team. A versatile player, he played on either side of defence, as well as in midfield.

Comminges began his career playing for Amiens SC, breaking into the first-team during the 2001–02 season. He joined Stade Reims of Ligue 2 the following season, and spent four years with the club. In 2007, Comminges moved to England, signing for Football League One side Swindon Town on a one-year deal, after a successful trial, and played regularly during the 2007–08 season. When his contract expired, he signed for Championship side Cardiff City on a free transfer. During his time at Cardiff, Comminges was briefly loaned out to Carlisle United. In January 2011, he left Cardiff and joined Southend United on a free transfer for the remainder of the 2010–11 campaign. He was released by Southend at the end of the season, and later signed for MLS side Colorado Rapids in September 2011. Comminges left the club when his short-term contract expired in January 2012. He joined League One side Stevenage, signing in September 2012 after a successful trial period, and spent a season at the club before being released in May 2013.

== Club career ==
=== France ===
Comminges had played youth football in his native Guadeloupe for local side Rapid Club Petit-Canal before moving to France in 1997. After a successful spell on trial, he joined the youth academy at Amiens SC at the age of 15, breaking into the first-team in 2002. Although naturally right-footed, Comminges' first experience in the Amiens first-team came as a left sided player as manager Denis Troch was forced to utilise him in an unfamiliar position following an injury crisis at the club. During the 2002–03 season, he made 14 league appearances as Amiens finished in a mid-table position, despite only being on an amateur contract at the club. He left the club in May 2003, and joined Stade Reims of Championnat National, the third division of the French football league system, on a free transfer. In his first season with the club, he helped the side earn promotion to Ligue 2, with Reims finishing the season as champions. During his four years with the club, Comminges made 74 league appearances, with Reims establishing themselves in the second tier of French football.

=== Swindon Town ===
Shortly after leaving Reims, Comminges was invited to England for a trial at League One side Swindon Town after impressing manager Paul Sturrock, who had travelled to France a year earlier on a scouting tour. His trial period was successful, and he signed a one-year deal in July 2007, earning early praise from Sturrock for his performances in the club's pre-season friendly matches, describing him as "outstanding" following a 4–0 victory over Austrian side SV Bad Ischl. Comminges made his debut on the opening day of the 2007–08 season, replacing Sofiane Zaaboub on the left side of midfield, in a 1–1 away draw against Northampton Town. Three days later, on 14 August 2007, Comminges made his first start for the club, playing the first 59 minutes in a 2–0 home loss to Charlton Athletic in the League Cup. He was almost ever-present for Swindon during the season, playing regularly at right-back, before finishing the season on the opposite side of the defence, making 47 appearances in all competitions. At the end of the campaign, with Swindon finishing in mid-table, Comminges was named as the club's Player of the Year. New Swindon manager Maurice Malpas stated a desire to extend Comminges' contract, and the player was offered a new two-year deal in April 2008. However, Malpas indicated that he was losing patience with Comminges' hesitation in signing the contract, and shortly after, Comminges' agent informed the club that he would be signing for Championship side Cardiff City – a claim that Cardiff initially denied.

=== Cardiff City ===
In May 2008, Comminges announced that he would be leaving Swindon at the end of the season to sign for Cardiff. Again, despite Comminges' claims, Cardiff chairman Peter Ridsdale stated the club had "not had any conversation with Swindon Town or the player". A month later, on 6 June 2008, Comminges joined Cardiff City on a two-year contract, with the move to be completed on 1 July. Comminges made his debut for the club on 12 August during a 2–1 victory over AFC Bournemouth in the League Cup, before making his league debut four days later in a 1–1 draw with Doncaster Rovers. He enjoyed an extended run in the first-team at left back through September, covering for the injured Tony Capaldi and Mark Kennedy. Comminges received the first red card of his career in the club's 1–0 away loss to Queens Park Rangers in November 2008, picking up a second yellow for dissent. He featured regularly for the club during the season, playing in a number of positions and making 33 appearances in all competitions as Cardiff narrowly missed out on the play-off positions on goals scored.

A knee injury would limit Comminges to just two appearances during the 2009–10 season, missing nine months of first-team action as a result of the injury. He had suffered the injury during training at the club after teammate Jay Bothroyd fell awkwardly onto Comminges, causing his knee ligament to detach. Comminges originally attempted to continue training but was ordered not to by manager Dave Jones on the advice of club doctors, who later discovered the severity of the injury. Comminges' contract was initially due to expire at the end of the season but, having suffered the injury, he was offered a six-month extension by the club until January 2011 in order to regain fitness and improve his chances of finding a new club. His appearance as a 90th-minute substitute in a 3–1 away victory at Plymouth Argyle on 18 August 2009 would ultimately be his last for the club.

Having not featured for Cardiff during the opening months of the 2010–11 season, Comminges joined League One side Carlisle United on a short-term loan deal until 31 December 2010. Carlisle manager Greg Abbott hinted at the possibility of a permanent deal, should the loan be a success. However, Comminges failed to make a league appearance during his three-month loan spell, playing just 45 minutes in a 3–2 win over Conference National side Tamworth in the FA Cup. The adverse weather conditions during his loan agreement had resulted in a spate of postponements, and Comminges returned to his parent club earlier than agreed. On returning to Cardiff, he was told he was free to find a new club with his contract expiring at the end of the season. He left the club by mutual consent, and subsequently joined League Two side Southend United on a free transfer in January 2011.

=== Later career ===
He made his debut for the Shrimpers a day after signing, coming on as a 60th-minute substitute in a 2–1 defeat to Cheltenham Town at Roots Hall. Comminges made seven appearances during his time at Southend, all of which in the league. In May 2011, he was one of five players told they were to be released by the club. Following an unsuccessful trial at Plymouth Argyle during pre-season prior to the 2011–12 season, Comminges signed for MLS club Colorado Rapids in September 2011, joining on a free transfer, and on a short-term contract. He made his debut for the club five days after signing, on 14 September, coming on as a second-half substitute in a 4–1 home loss to Santos Laguna in the CONCACAF Champions League. He went on to make nine appearances for Rapids in all competitions. Despite playing regularly towards the latter stages of the season, Colorado Rapids confirmed that Comminges would not return for the 2012 campaign, and he subsequently left as a free agent when his contract expired in January 2012.

Ahead of the 2012–13 season, Comminges returned to England and spent pre-season with League One side Stevenage, managed by former Colorado Rapids manager Gary Smith. Although his signing was not announced by the club, he was an unused substitute in Stevenage's 1–1 draw with Shrewsbury Town on 1 September 2012. The club later confirmed that Comminges had signed on a permanent deal, which was later revealed as being a six-month contract until January 2013. He made his debut in Stevenage's first home league win of the season, playing the whole match in a 3–1 victory over Walsall on 18 September 2012. In January 2013, his contract was extended until the end of the 2012–13 season, and he went on to make 21 appearances during the campaign. He was released by Stevenage when his contract expired in May 2013.

== International career ==
Comminges was called up to the Guadeloupe team, ahead of the 2007 Gold Cup. The 2007 edition of the tournament was the first time the country had participated in the competition. He made his debut in Guadeloupe's opening game of the tournament, playing the whole match in a 1–1 draw with Haiti. He went on to play in one of the two remaining group matches; starting in a surprise 2–1 victory over group winners Canada, before missing a 1–0 defeat to Costa Rica through suspension. Finishing the group in third place with four points, Guadeloupe qualified as one of the best two third-place finishers. Comminges subsequently started in the quarter-final match, as Guadeloupe defeated Honduras 2–1. Comminges earned his fourth cap in the semi-final, as his country narrowly lost to Mexico by a 1–0 scoreline.

In 2008, Comminges made three appearances for the regional team, all of which in friendly matches. The following year, he was named in Roger Salnot's 23-man squad for the 2009 Gold Cup. He started in all three group matches, with Guadeloupe finishing in second place with six points out of a possible nine. Comminges played in his fourth match of the tournament, earning his eleventh cap in the process, as his country fell at the quarter-final stage of the competition courtesy of a 5–1 defeat to Costa Rica. He participated in his third Gold Cup in 2011, playing in two matches as Guadeloupe finished bottom of their group after losing all three matches. To date, Comminges has made 15 appearances for his country.

== Personal life ==
He is the son of Jeanne and Jerome Comminges, and has three brothers. Comminges was born in Les Abymes, Guadeloupe, and was raised in Petit-Canal. He states that he grew up always wanting to be a professional footballer; playing football in the streets in his hometown before playing organised football from the age of seven upwards, despite his mothers initial reluctance for him to pursue a career in football. Following his move to France, Comminges attended Louis Thuillier High School in Amiens.

== Honours ==
Stade Reims

- Championnat National: 2003–04

Individual

- Swindon Town Player of the Year: 2007–08

== Career statistics ==
=== Club ===
As of 20 April 2013.

Club	Season	League^{[A]}		FA Cup		League Cup		MLS Cup		Other^{[B]}		Total	
Club	Season	Apps	Goals	Apps	Goals	Apps	Goals	Apps	Goals	Apps	Goals	Apps	Goals
Swindon Town	2007–08	40	0	4	0	1	0	0	0	2	0	47	0
Swindon Town	Total	40	0	4	0	1	0	0	0	2	0	47	0
Cardiff City	2008–09	30	0	0	0	3	0	0	0	0	0	33	0
Cardiff City	2009–10	1	0	0	0	1	0	0	0	0	0	2	0
Cardiff City	2010–11	0	0	0	0	0	0	0	0	0	0	0	0
Cardiff City	Total	31	0	0	0	4	0	0	0	0	0	35	0
Carlisle United (loan)	2010–11	0	0	1	0	0	0	0	0	0	0	1	0
Carlisle United (loan)	Total	0	0	1	0	0	0	0	0	0	0	1	0
Southend United	2010–11	7	0	0	0	0	0	0	0	0	0	7	0
Southend United	Total	7	0	0	0	0	0	0	0	0	0	7	0
Colorado Rapids	2011	4	0	0	0	0	0	3	0	2	0	9	0
Colorado Rapids	Total	4	0	0	0	0	0	3	0	2	0	9	0
Stevenage	2012–13	21	0	0	0	0	0	0	0	0	0	21	0
Stevenage	Total	21	0	0	0	0	0	0	0	0	0	21	0
Career totals		103	0	5	0	5	0	3	0	4	0	120	0

A. The "League" column constitutes appearances and goals in the Football League and MLS.
B. The "Other" column constitutes appearances and goals in the Football League Trophy and CONCACAF Champions League.

=== International ===
National team	Season	Apps	Goals
Guadeloupe
Guadeloupe	2007	4	0
Guadeloupe	2008	3	0
Guadeloupe	2009	4	0
Guadeloupe	2010	2	0
Guadeloupe	2011	2	0
Total		15	0
