= Julien Ictoi =

French footballer (born 1978)

Personal information
- Full name: Julien Ictoi
- Date of birth: 22 March 1978 (age 48)
- Place of birth: Poissy, France
- Height: 1.78 m (5 ft 10 in)
- Positions: Defender; striker

Youth career
- 1993–1999: Poissy
- 1999–2001: Paris Saint-Germain

Senior career*
Years	Team	Apps	(Gls)
2001–2006	Mantes	104	(21)
2006–2007	Quevilly	33	(4)
2007–2008	Pacy Vallée-d'Eure	13	(0)
2008–2010	Mantes	22	(0)
2010–2017	Le Moule		

International career
2010–2011	Guadeloupe	0	(0)
- * Club domestic league appearances and goals

Julien Ictoi (born 22 March 1978) is a retired French footballer.

== Career ==
Ictoi was born in Poissy. Initially, he began his career playing as a striker, but switched to defense in 2007 after signing with Pacy Vallée-d'Eure. Ictoi has spent the majority of his career playing in the amateur divisions of France, most notably with Mantes, whom he made over 100 appearances with. In 2010, he ventured to his native homeland of Guadeloupe joining CS Moulien. In his inaugural season with the club, Ictoi won the Guadeloupe Division d'Honneur.

== Honours ==
- Guadeloupe Division d'Honneur: 2010–11
