= Jonathan Beaulieu-Bourgault =

Canadian soccer player

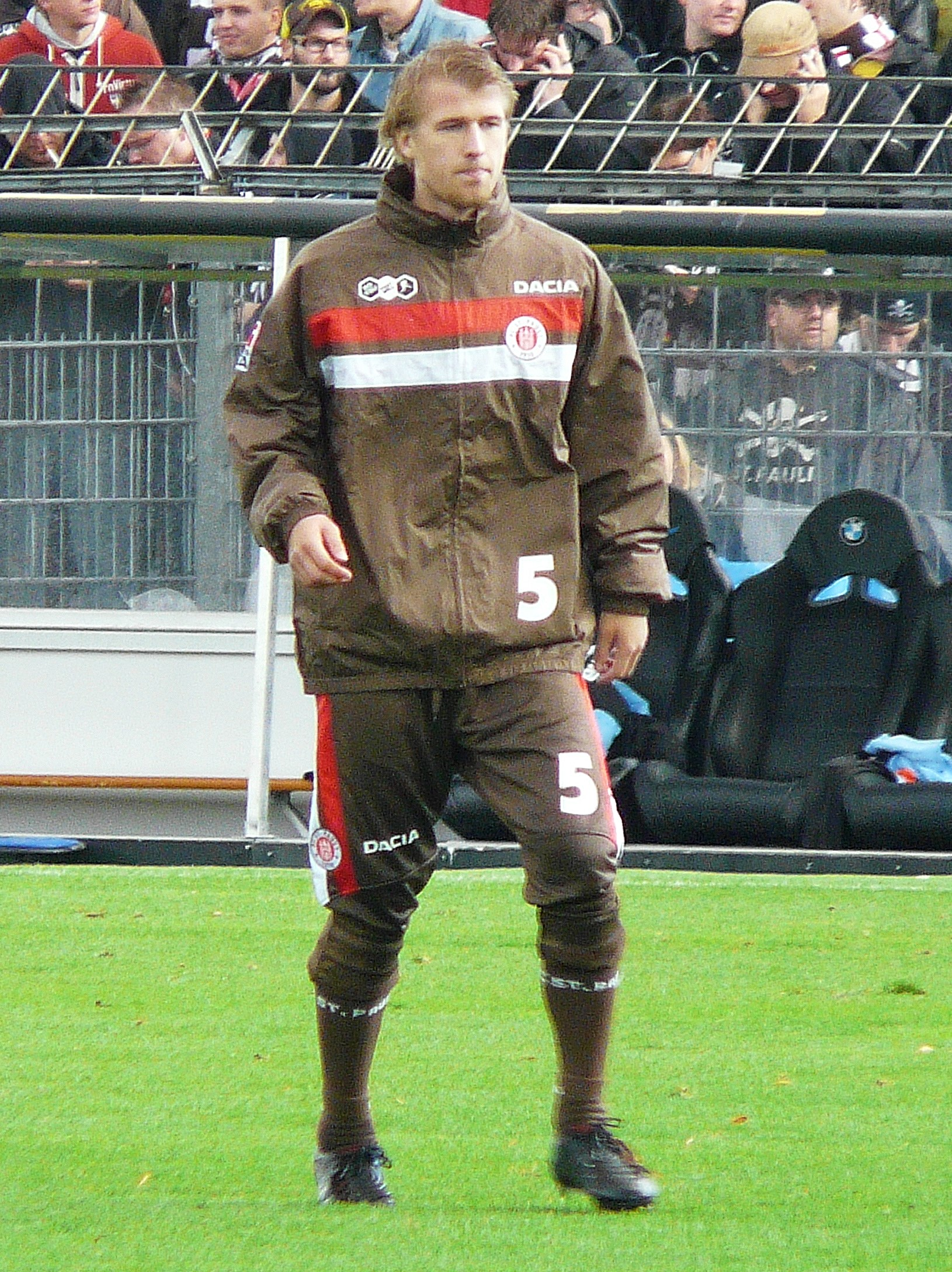
- Beaulieu-Bourgault with St. Pauli in 2009

Personal information
- Full name: Jonathan Beaulieu-Bourgault
- Date of birth: September 27, 1988 (age 38)
- Place of birth: Montreal, Quebec, Canada
- Height: 1.80 m (5 ft 11 in)
- Position: Defensive midfielder

Youth career
- 2003–2005: Lakers du Lac Saint-Louis

Senior career*
Years	Team	Apps	(Gls)
2006–2010	FC St. Pauli II	46	(2)
2006–2010	FC St. Pauli	11	(0)
2008–2009	→ SV Wilhelmshaven (loan)	23	(1)
2009	→ SV Wilhelmshaven II (loan)	1	(0)
2010–2012	Preußen Münster	51	(1)
Total		132	(4)

International career
2004–2005	Canada U17	7	(1)
2006–2007	Canada U20	15	(1)
2009–2013	Canada	10	(0)
- * Club domestic league appearances and goals

Jonathan Beaulieu-Bourgault (born September 27, 1988) is a Canadian former professional soccer player who played as a defensive midfielder.

== Club career ==
Born in Montreal, Quebec, Beaulieu-Bourgault helped FC St. Pauli gain promotion from the Regionalliga Nord to the 2. Bundesliga during the 2006–07 season, after being forced to sit out the prior season due to a broken leg. Beaulieu-Bourgault signed with the German side at age 17 after being scouted while playing for Lakers du Lac Saint-Louis in Quebec.

On June 21, 2010 he signed with Preußen Münster, where he spent two years.

== International career ==
Beaulieu-Bourgault played for the Canada national U20 team. He made his debut in a three-match series against Brazil in May 2006. The Canadians won the first match 2–1, which was the first time any Canadian team had won against the Brazil national team. He contributed by making a key defensive play which resulted in the attacking move which created the winning goal. Prior to that, he was a member of the Canadian team in the 2005 FIFA World Youth Championship, although he did not play for the team.

He was called up to the U20 team for the 2007 FIFA U-20 World Cup in his home nation and played in all three of the team's matches. In the match against the Congo on July 8, 2007, Canada's goalkeeper Asmir Begović was red carded for handling the ball outside the box. As coach Dale Mitchell had already made his three substitutions, Beaulieu-Bourgault took the place of goalkeeper for the final fifteen minutes of the match. He made several impressive saves and kept a clean sheet for his portion of the match (which ended 2–0 for the Congo, both goals already having been conceded by Begovic) which led to rousing applause by the Canadian fans.

On November 11, 2009 he received his first senior call-up for Canada. He made his senior debut as a substitute in a friendly against Macedonia on November 14, 2009.

== Personal life ==
He speaks English, French and German fluently.
