= Cédric Collet =

French footballer (born 1984)

Personal information
- Full name: Cédric Collet
- Date of birth: 7 March 1984 (age 42)
- Place of birth: Brétigny-sur-Orge, France
- Height: 1.80 m (5 ft 11 in)
- Position: Left winger

Team information
- Current team: Créteil
- Number: 11

Youth career
- CS Sedan-Ardennes

Senior career*
Years	Team	Apps	(Gls)
2002–2004	Sedan	2	(0)
2004–2005	Romorantin	32	(4)
2005–2007	Tours	60	(4)
2007–2008	Brest	21	(2)
2008–2009	Mons	29	(2)
2009–2011	Standard Liège	3	(0)
2011	Beauvais	9	(0)
2011–2012	Reims	9	(0)
2012	Beira-Mar	9	(0)
2013–	Créteil	0	(0)

International career^{‡}
2008–present	Guadeloupe	13	(1)
- * Club domestic league appearances and goals as of 2 April 2013 ‡ National team caps and goals as of 7 December 2011

Cédric Collet (born 7 March 1984) is a French association football midfielder who currently plays for US Créteil-Lusitanos. Collet previously played for Standard Liège in Belgium and S.C. Beira-Mar in Portugal.

== International career ==
Collet made his debut for Guadeloupe in an October 2008 Caribbean Cup match against the Cayman Islands. He scored in his second game against Grenada.
