= Livio Nabab =

Guadeloupean footballer (born 1988)

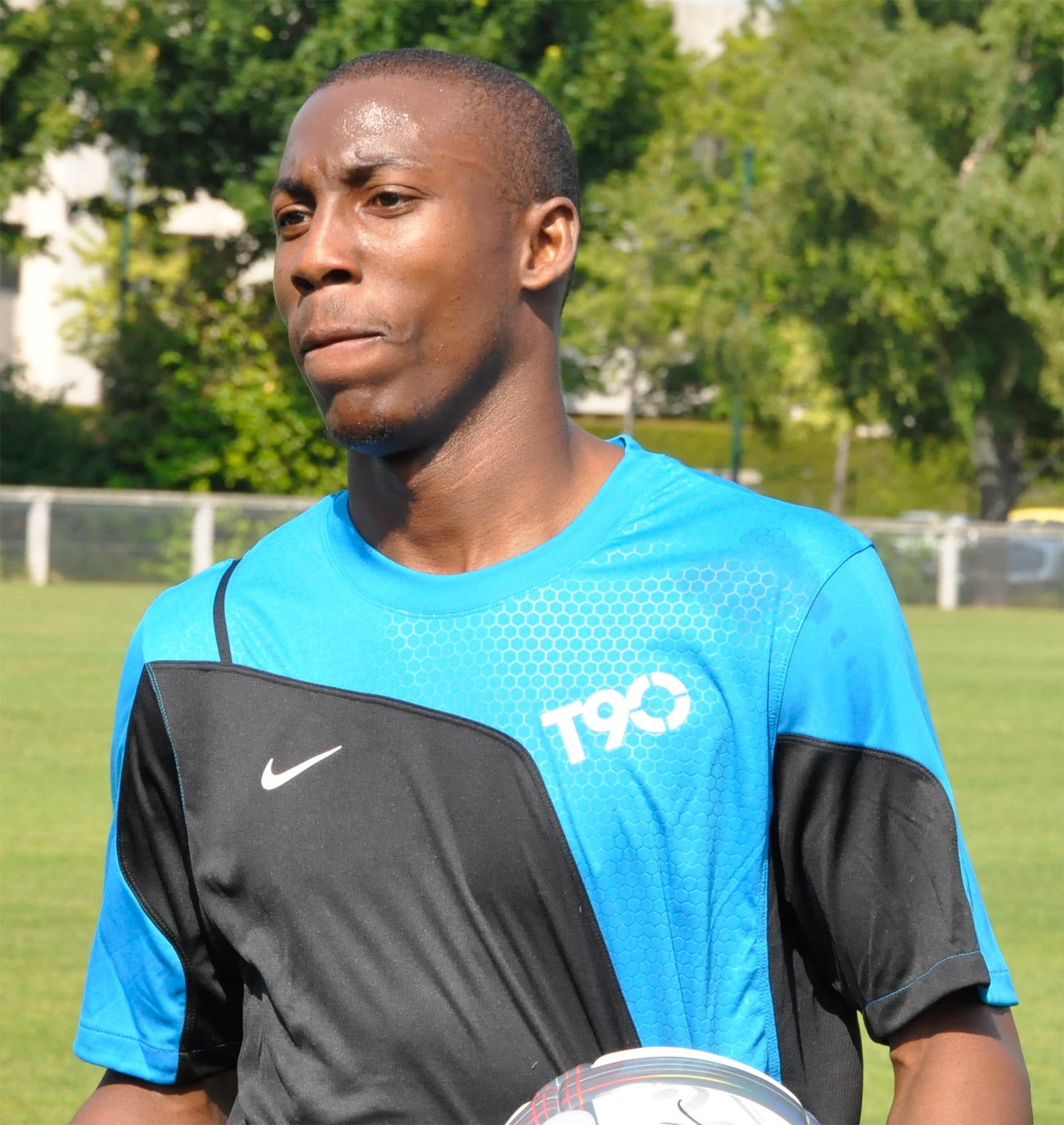
- Nabab training with Caen in 2010

Personal information
- Date of birth: 14 June 1988 (age 38)
- Place of birth: Les Abymes, Guadeloupe
- Height: 1.85 m (6 ft 1 in)
- Position: Striker

Team information
- Current team: Granville

Youth career
- –2006: Arsenal Petit-Bourg
- 2006–2009: Caen

Senior career*
Years	Team	Apps	(Gls)
2009–2013	Caen	86	(13)
2011	→ Laval (loan)	12	(1)
2013–2014	Arles-Avignon	34	(8)
2014–2015	Auxerre	34	(6)
2015–2016	Waasland-Beveren	21	(2)
2016–2018	Orléans	54	(4)
2018–2020	Bourg-Péronnas	40	(6)
2020–	Granville	6	(2)

International career^{‡}
2008–	Guadeloupe	15	(1)
- * Club domestic league appearances and goals as of 16:39, 27 January 2021 (UTC) ‡ National team caps and goals as of 19 November 2018

Livio Nabab (born 14 June 1988) is a French professional footballer who plays as a striker for French Championnat National 1 side US Granville.

== Club career ==
Nabab was born in Les Abymes, Guadeloupe. He made his professional debut for SM Caen on 4 April 2009 in a Ligue 1 game against Toulouse FC. He was loaned out to Stade Lavallois during the 2010–11 season. On 31 August 2013, he left Caen to play for Ligue 2 side Arles-Avignon.

Nabab played just one year of his three-year deal at Arles-Avignon, moving in July 2014 to Auxerre. At the end of the 2014–15 season he signed a two-year deal with Belgian club Waasland-Beveren.

In June 2016, Nabab returned to France, signing an initial one-year deal with US Orléans in Ligue 2. The option in the contract depending upon Orléans avoiding relegation was triggered and he remained with the club for a second season.

In July 2018, Nabab signed a two-year deal with Bourg-Péronnas in the Championnat National. Release by Bourg-Péronnas at the end of the 2019–20 season, he dropped down a division to Championnat National 2 with US Granville.

== International career ==
Nabab has also represented Guadeloupe in international competition, playing for the team at the 2010 Caribbean Cup and the 2011 CONCACAF Gold Cup.

== Career statistics ==
=== Club ===
As of match played 26 September 2020

Appearances and goals by club, season and competition
Club	Season	League			National cup		League cup		Other		Total	
Club	Season	Division	Apps	Goals	Apps	Goals	Apps	Goals	Apps	Goals	Apps	Goals
Caen	2008–09	Ligue 1	3	0	0	0	0	0	—		3	0
Caen	2009–10	Ligue 2	4	0	0	0	0	0	—		4	0
Caen	2010–11	Ligue 1	8	1	0	0	2	0	—		10	1
Caen	2011–12	Ligue 1	22	4	1	0	2	2	—		25	6
Caen	2012–13	Ligue 2	33	6	2	2	3	1	—		38	9
Caen	2013–14	Ligue 2	4	2	0	0	2	0	—		6	2
Caen	Total		74	13	3	2	9	3	0	0	86	18
Caen II	2010–11	CFA	7	1	—		—		—		7	1
Caen II	2011–12	CFA	7	0	—		—		—		7	0
Caen II	Total		14	1	—		—		0	0	14	1
Laval (loan)	2010–11	Ligue 2	12	1	0	0	0	0	—		12	1
Arles-Avignon	2013–14	Ligue 2	33	8	0	0	0	0	—		33	8
Auxerre	2014–15	Ligue 2	26	3	6	2	0	0	—		32	5
Auxerre	2015–16	Ligue 2	0	0	0	0	1	0	—		1	0
Auxerre	Total		26	3	6	2	1	0	0	0	33	5
Waasland-Beveren	2015–16	Pro League	20	1	1	1	—		—		21	2
Orléans	2016–17	Ligue 2	32	4	0	0	1	0	2	1	35	5
Orléans	2017–18	Ligue 2	22	0	1	0	2	1	—		25	1
Orléans	Total		54	4	1	0	3	1	2	1	60	6
Orléans II	2017–18	National 3	4	2	—		—		—		4	2
Bourg-Péronnas	2018–19	Championnat National	24	5	0	0	0	0	0	0	24	5
Bourg-Péronnas	2019–20	National	16	1	3	0	4	3	0	0	22	4
Bourg-Péronnas	Total		40	6	3	0	4	3	0	0	47	9
Granville	2020–21	National 2	6	0	0	0	—		0	0	6	0
Career total			283	39	14	5	17	8	2	1	316	52

=== International ===
Scores and results list Guadeloupe's goal tally first, score column indicates score after each Nabab goal.

List of international goals scored by Livio Nabab
No.	Date	Venue	Opponent	Score	Result	Competition
1	29 March 2016	André Kamperveen Stadion, Paramaribo, Suriname	Suriname	2–1	2–3	2017 Caribbean Cup qualification
