= Luis Henríquez =

Panamanian footballer (born 1981)

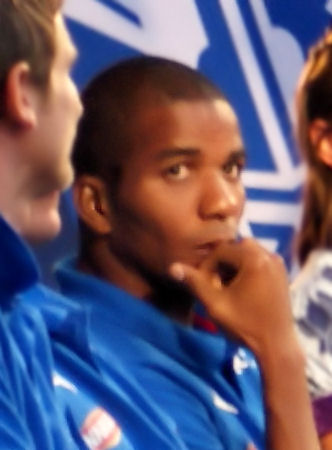
- Henríquez with Lech Poznań in 2008

Personal information
- Full name: Luis Alfonso Henríquez Ledezma
- Date of birth: 23 November 1981 (age 44)
- Place of birth: Panama City, Panama
- Height: 1.74 m (5 ft 9 in)
- Position: Left-back

Senior career*
Years	Team	Apps	(Gls)
2001–2002	Sporting '89		
2003–2004	Árabe Unido	44	(2)
2005	Envigado	35	(1)
2006–2007	Tauro	51	(3)
2007–2015	Lech Poznań	139	(5)
2014	Lech Poznań II	1	(0)
2015–2017	Tauro	24	(1)
2017–2022	Polonia Środa Wlkp.	97	(7)
2022–2023	Szturm Junikowo Poznań	17	(0)
2023–2024	Warta Śrem	23	(4)

International career
2003–2016	Panama	89	(2)
- * Club domestic league appearances and goals

Luis Alfonso Henríquez Ledezma (born 23 November 1981) is a Panamanian former professional footballer who played as a left-back. He was most recently the assistant coach of Polish club Polonia Środa Wielkopolska.

== Club career ==
Nicknamed Coco, Henríquez played for Sporting '89 and Árabe Unido in Panama before moving abroad to play for Colombian side Envigado. After two seasons back in Panama with Tauro, he joined Polish club Lech Poznań in 2007 for a lengthy spell. He was released by Lech in summer 2015 after eight years with the club.

Henríquez returned to Tauro in September 2015.

== International career ==
Henríquez made his debut for Panama in an August 2003 friendly match against Paraguay and has earned a total of 89 official caps, scoring two goals. He represented his country in 26 FIFA World Cup qualification matches and was a member of the 2005 CONCACAF Gold Cup team, who finished second in the tournament. He also played at the 2007 and 2011 CONCACAF Gold Cups.

Scores and results list Panama's goal tally first, score column indicates score after each Henríquez goal.

List of international goals scored by Luis Henríquez
No.	Date	Venue	Opponent	Score	Result	Competition
1	6 February 2013	Estadio Rommel Fernández, Panama City, Panama	Costa Rica	1–0	2–2	2014 FIFA World Cup qualification
2	22 March 2013	Independence Park, Kingston, Jamaica	Jamaica	1–1	1–1	2014 FIFA World Cup qualification

== Honours ==
Árabe Unido

- Liga Panameña de Fútbol: 2004

Tauro

- Liga Panameña de Fútbol: 2007 (A)

Lech Poznań

- Ekstraklasa: 2009–10, 2014–15
- Polish Cup: 2008–09

Polonia Środa Wielkopolska

- Polish Cup (Greater Poland regionals): 2017–18, 2018–19, 2021–22
- Polish Cup (Poznań regionals): 2017–18, 2018–19

Szturm Junikowo

- Regional league Greater Poland II: 2022–23
- Polish Cup (Poznań regionals): 2022–23

Panama

- CONCACAF Gold Cup runner-up: 2005; third place: 2015
