= Loïc Loval =

Guadeloupean footballer (born 1981)

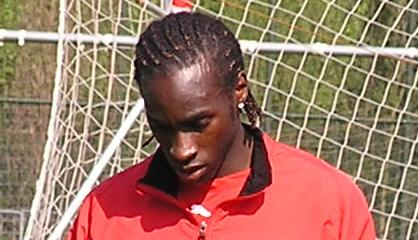

Personal information
- Full name: Loïc Loval Landré
- Date of birth: 28 September 1981 (age 45)
- Place of birth: Longjumeau, France
- Height: 1.74 m (5 ft 9 in)
- Position: Striker

Youth career
- Sochaux
- Valenciennes
- Besançon
- 2000–2001: Sochaux

Senior career*
Years	Team	Apps	(Gls)
2001–2003	Besançon	12	(0)
2003–2005	De Graafschap	44	(8)
2005–2007	Go Ahead Eagles	51	(15)
2007–2010	Utrecht	82	(9)
2010–2012	Vannes	42	(13)
2012–2013	Mulhouse	17	(2)
2013–2015	Orléans	35	(8)
2015–2016	FC Fleury 91	12	(0)
Total		295	(55)

International career
2007–2014	Guadeloupe	22	(5)
- * Club domestic league appearances and goals

Loïc Loval Landré (born 28 September 1981) is a former professional footballer who played as a striker. He spent most of his career in the Netherlands for De Graafschap, Go Ahead Eagles and FC Utrecht. Born in mainland France, he was an international for the Guadeloupean national team.

== Early life ==
Loval was born in Longjumeau, a commune in the southern suburbs of Paris, France. He grew up in neighbouring town Évry. When he was eleven, he moved with his mother and stepfather to Guadeloupe, where his parents hailed from.

== Club career ==
=== Early career ===
Loval started at a youth player for a squad on Guadeloupe, and after a tournament in France with his team, several big French club showed their interest. He decided to play for a sport academy in Paris, and was contacted by Sochaux who signed him to their youth team. At Sochaux he, among others, was in a team with El Hadji Diouf, but after some years he left Sochaux. After some years playing for Valenciennes and Besançon, he was scouted by Cercle Brugge. He could sign a contract, but was persuaded by John van den Brom, scout for Dutch team, De Graafschap, to sign for them.

=== Netherlands ===
Loval arrived in Doetinchem in 2003. His first season with De Graafschap was successful; he scored 3 goals in 25 matches, and clinched promotion with his team through the play-offs for promotion and relegation. After 19 matches and 5 goals in the Eredivisie, Loval signed with Go Ahead Eagles in 2005, a club playing in the second-tier Eerste Divisie.

In his first season for the club from Deventer, Loval immediately became club-topscorer with 11 goals in 30 games. He was now chased by several clubs in the highest Dutch league, but finally, on 27 January 2007 he signed a contract with FC Utrecht.

He was originally signed as a midfielder, but got a place as a forward because of the lack of strikers. Loval had a contract that runs until 2011 with Utrecht, and stated that he would not play for any other Dutch club than FC Utrecht.

=== Return to France ===
In August 2010 he returned to France and signed with Vannes OC on a free transfer. It was announced that Loval left FC Utrecht for personal reasons.

In June 2015, Loval moved to Orléans where he made 35 appearances in which he scored 8 goals in two years, and subsequently signed for FC Fleury 91, where he played in Championnat de France Amateur for the 2015–16 season; his final season playing football.

== International career ==
=== Guadeloupe ===
Loval made his debut for Guadeloupe at the CONCACAF Gold Cup Finals in June 2007 against Haiti together with former FC Utrecht-teammate, Franck Grandel. He also played at the 2008 Caribbean Cup.

== Career statistics ==
Scores and results list Guadeloupe's goal tally first, score column indicates score after each Loval goal.

List of international goals scored by Loïc Loval
No.	Date	Venue	Opponent	Score	Result	Competition
1	5 July 2009	Oakland–Alameda County Coliseum, Oakland, Guadeloupe	Panama	1–0	1–2	2009 CONCACAF Gold Cup
2	27 November 2010	Stade En Camée, Riviére-Pilote, Guadeloupe	Guyana	1–0	1–1	2010 Caribbean Championship
