= Eduardo Dasent =

Panamanian footballer (born 1988)

Personal information
- Full name: Eduardo Cesar Dasent Paz
- Date of birth: October 12, 1988 (age 38)
- Place of birth: Panama City, Panama
- Height: 1.85 m (6 ft 1 in)
- Position: Defender

Team information
- Current team: Independiente

Senior career*
Years	Team	Apps	(Gls)
2006–2014	Tauro	145	(11)
2010	→ Marquense (loan)	14	(0)
2011	→ Bucaramanga (loan)	14	(0)
2014–	Independiente	10	(0)

International career^{‡}
2006–2007	Panama U-20	9	(0)
2008	Panama U-23	2	(0)
2010–	Panama	17	(0)
- * Club domestic league appearances and goals as of 18 June 2007 ‡ National team caps and goals as of 9 June 2015

Eduardo Dasent (born 12 October 1988) is a Panamanian football defender who currently plays for Liga Panameña de Fútbol side Independiente La Chorrera.

== Club career ==
Dasent started a lengthy spell at Tauro in 2006. He had loan spells at Guatemalan side Marquense and Colombian club Atlético Bucaramanga. He joined Independiente in July 2014.

== International career ==
Dasent was part of the Panama U-20 squad that participated in the 2007 FIFA World Youth Cup in Canada.

He made his senior debut for Panama in a November 2010 friendly match against Honduras and has, as of 8 June 2015, earned a total of 17 caps, scoring no goals. He represented his country in 5 FIFA World Cup qualification matches and played at the 2011 CONCACAF Gold Cup.

== Honors ==
=== Club ===
- Liga Panameña de Fútbol (1): 2007 (A)
