= Josh Simpson (soccer) =

Canadian soccer player (born 1983)

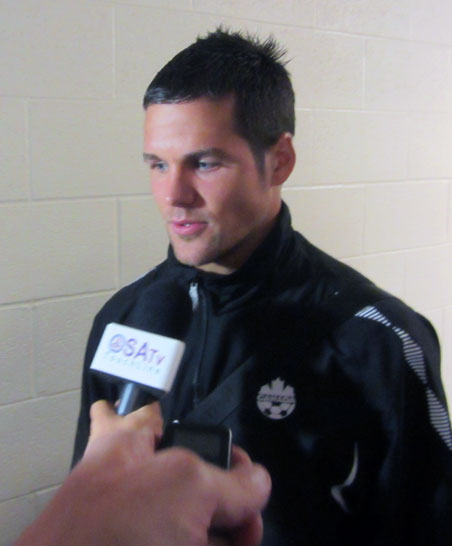
- Simpson in 2011

Personal information
- Full name: Joshua Christopher Simpson
- Date of birth: May 15, 1983 (age 43)
- Place of birth: Burnaby, British Columbia, Canada
- Height: 1.83 m (6 ft 0 in)
- Position: Winger

Youth career
- 1995–2001: LISA

College career
Years	Team	Apps	(Gls)
2001–2003	Portland Pilots		

Senior career*
Years	Team	Apps	(Gls)
2004	Boulder Rapids Reserve	14	(7)
2004–2006	Millwall	43	(2)
2006–2009	1. FC Kaiserslautern	63	(12)
2009–2012	Manisaspor	78	(18)
2012–2015	Young Boys	11	(0)
2016	Muri-Gümligen		
Total		209	(39)

International career
2002–2003	Canada U20	20	(3)
2001–2004	Canada U23	5	(0)
2004–2012	Canada	43	(4)
- * Club domestic league appearances and goals

Joshua Christopher 'Josh' Simpson (born May 15, 1983) is a Canadian former professional soccer player who is currently the president of Canadian Premier League team Pacific FC. During a career that included stops in England, Germany, Turkey, and Switzerland, he earned 43 caps for Canada before retiring from professional soccer after being unable to recover from a leg injury.

== Club career ==
Born in Burnaby, British Columbia, Simpson started his career on a soccer scholarship with the University of Portland. In 2004, Simpson spent time with Boulder Rapids Reserve in the USL Premier Development League where he was named to the PDL all conference team. Shortly after, he and fellow Canadian Adrian Serioux signed with Millwall. He made his debut against Plymouth Argyle. On May 23, 2006, he signed a three-year contract with German team 1. FC Kaiserslautern and left the club on June 25, 2009 to sign with Turkish club Manisaspor. Simpson scored his first hat-trick in a 3–0 home victory on September 26, 2010 vs. Sivasspor. On February 22, 2011, Simpson signed a new three-year contract with Manisa, keeping him at the club until the end of the 2013–14 season. Simpson had his best professional season in 2010–11 with Manisapor leading the team with 12 goals and taking his team to tenth place. Simpson was tied for seventh in goals along with Jajá and Olcan Adın in the Süper Lig.

Simpson made his debut for the 2011–12 season as a second half sub for Ariza Makukula against Trabzonspor on September 10, Manisaspor was tailing by a goal until Simpson scored the tying goal in the 88th minute. Following his second goal of the season against Fenerbahçe in a 2–1 loss January 16, 2012, it was announced the following day that Simpson had terminated his contract with the team over unpaid wages.

On January 19, 2012 Simpson signed for BSC Young Boys on a three-and-a-half-year deal. Simpson made his Young Boys debut on February 12 as a second half sub for David Degen in a 1–0 victory over FC Sion.

On May 23 the last game of the season against FC Basel, Simpson sustained a broken leg that was initially expected to keep him out for 3 months forcing him to miss the next round of international games for Canada after being called up the previous week. However, the injury turned out to be far more serious, which was described by the BSC Young Boys website as a "terrible moment for the audience [in Basel to witness]." He retired in May 2015 after failing to recover.

In the spring of 2016 he made his return to soccer at the amateur level in Switzerland, signing with the Swiss 3. Liga's FC Muri-Gümligen in the 7th tier of Swiss football.

== International career ==
In 2003, he played for the Canada under-20 team at the World Youth Cup, where he scored the only goal in Canada's 1–0 win over Burkina Faso. He was also a call-up to the 2001 version, but not selected in the starting XI or on the bench.

He made his senior debut for Canada in a January 2004 friendly match against Barbados. Josh was later chosen in the 23-man roster for the 2009 CONCACAF Gold Cup, Canada won Group A with seven points before being knocked out by Honduras in the Quarter Finals. Simpson scored his first goal for the senior men's team in a 2–1 win over Honduras on September 7, 2010.

After failing to score in a disappointing 2011 CONCACAF Gold Cup Simpson scored two goals in Canada's first game of World Cup Qualifying against Saint Lucia on September 2, 2011 at the national stadium BMO Field. Two months later Simpson scored his fourth international goal against Saint Kitts and Nevis in an inconsequential world cup qualifying match, the game ended in a 4–0 victory for the Canadians. In early December, Simpson was shortlisted for the 2011 Canadian Player of the Year along with Dwayne De Rosario and Simeon Jackson, it was announced on December 14 that he had finished in third losing out to De Rosario.

== Career statistics ==
=== Club ===
Appearances and goals by club, season and competition
Club	Season	League			Cup		League Cup		Continental		Total	
Club	Season	Division	Apps	Goals	Apps	Goals	Apps	Goals	Apps	Goals	Apps	Goals
Millwall	2004–05	Championship	30	1	1	0	0	0	2	0	33	1
Millwall	2005–06	Championship	13	1	0	0	2	0	—		15	1
Millwall	Total		43	2	1	0	2	0	2	0	48	2
1. FC Kaiserslautern	2006–07	2. Bundesliga	21	3	1	0	—		—		22	3
1. FC Kaiserslautern	2007–08	2. Bundesliga	20	6	1	0	—		—		21	6
1. FC Kaiserslautern	2008–09	2. Bundesliga	22	3	0	0	—		—		22	3
1. FC Kaiserslautern	Total		63	12	2	0	—		—		65	12
1. FC Kaiserslautern II	2006–07	Regionalliga Süd	2	0	—		—		—		2	0
1. FC Kaiserslautern II	2007–08	Oberliga Südwest	1	2	—		—		—		1	2
1. FC Kaiserslautern II	2008–09	Regionalliga West	2	0	—		—		—		2	0
1. FC Kaiserslautern II	Total		5	2	—		—		—		5	2
Manisaspor	2009–10	Süper Lig	29	4	0	0	—		—		29	4
Manisaspor	2010–11	Süper Lig	32	12	0	0	—		—		32	12
Manisaspor	2011–12	Süper Lig	17	2	0	0	—		—		17	2
Manisaspor	Total		78	18	0	0	—		—		78	18
Young Boys	2011–12	Swiss Super League	11	0	0	0	—		—		11	0
Career total			200	34	3	0	2	0	2	0	207	34

=== International goals ===
Scores and results list Canada's goal tally first, score column indicates score after each Simpson goal.

List of international goals scored by Josh Simpson
No.	Date	Venue	Opponent	Score	Result	Competition
1	September 7, 2010	Saputo Stadium, Montreal, Quebec, Canada	Honduras	1–0	2–1	Friendly
2	September 2, 2011	BMO Field, Toronto, Ontario, Canada	Saint Lucia	1–0	4–1	2014 FIFA World Cup qualification
3	September 2, 2011	BMO Field, Toronto, Ontario, Canada	Saint Lucia	3–1	4–1	2014 FIFA World Cup qualification
4	November 15, 2011	BMO Field, Toronto, Ontario, Canada	Saint Kitts and Nevis	4–0	4–0	2014 FIFA World Cup qualification
