= Brice Jovial =

Association football player (born 1984)

Personal information
- Full name: Brice Jovial
- Date of birth: 25 January 1984 (age 42)
- Place of birth: Aubervilliers, France
- Height: 1.72 m (5 ft 8 in)
- Position: Striker

Senior career*
Years	Team	Apps	(Gls)
2003–2005	RCF Paris	46	(17)
2005	Empoli	0	(0)
2005–2006	Cannes	17	(4)
2006–2008	Charleroi	30	(2)
2007–2008	→ Namur (loan)	2	(0)
2009	Moissy-Cramayel	13	(6)
2009–2010	Beauvais	16	(9)
2010–2011	Le Havre	46	(19)
2011–2013	Dijon	54	(16)
2013	→ Chengdu Blades (loan)	15	(10)
2014	Chengdu Tiancheng	22	(12)
2015	Wuhan Zall	28	(12)

International career^{‡}
2011	Guadeloupe	2	(2)
- * Club domestic league appearances and goals as of 1 November 2015 ‡ National team caps and goals as of 5 July 2013

Brice Jovial (born 25 January 1984) is a former professional footballer who played as a striker. Born in metropolitan France, he played for the Guadeloupe national team.

== International goals ==
#	Date	Venue	Opponent	Score	Result	Competition
01.	7 June 2011	Ford Field, Detroit, USA	Panama	1 – 3	2 – 3	2011 CONCACAF Gold Cup
02.	7 June 2011	Ford Field, Detroit, USA	Panama	2 – 3	2 – 3	2011 CONCACAF Gold Cup

== Bibliography ==
- Brice Jovial est Zèbre!
