= Thomas Gamiette =

Guadeloupean footballer (born 1986)

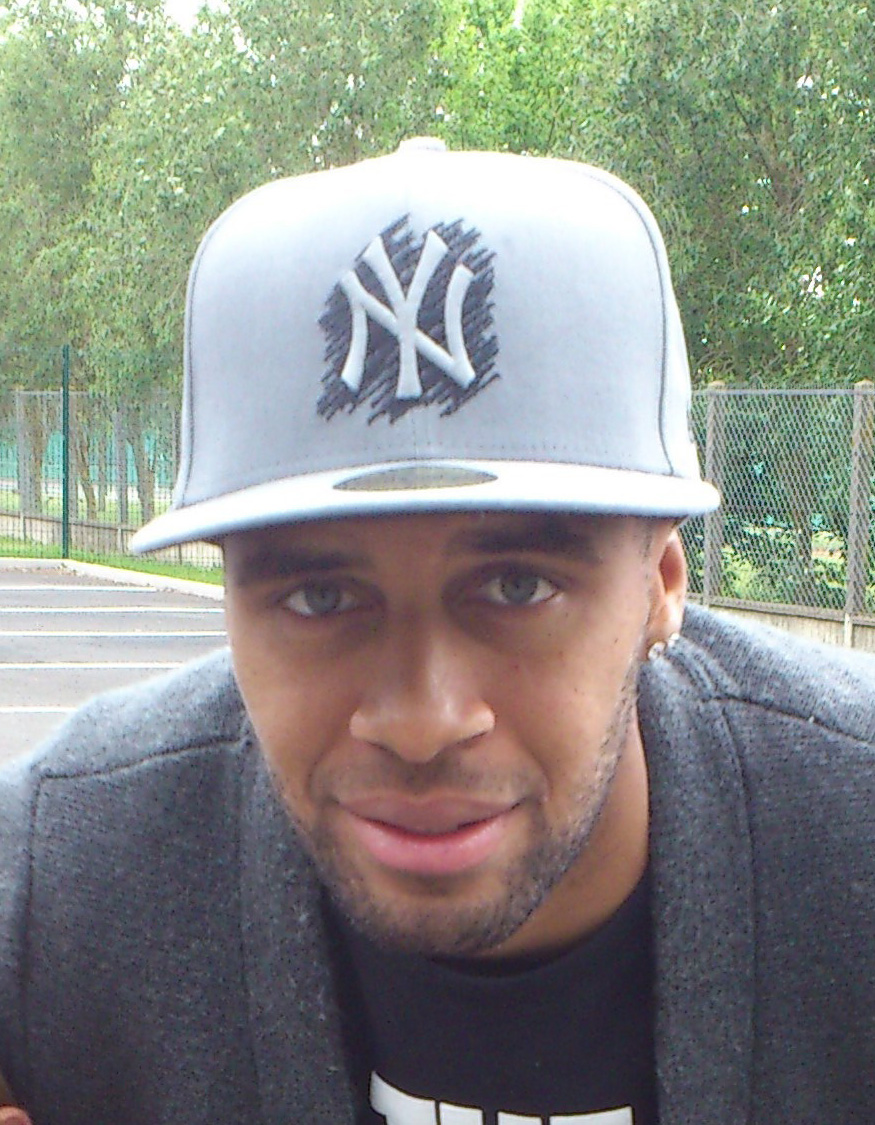

Personal information
- Date of birth: 21 June 1986 (age 40)
- Place of birth: Épinay-sur-Seine, France
- Height: 1.75 m (5 ft 9 in)
- Position: Defensive midfielder

Senior career*
Years	Team	Apps	(Gls)
2008–2011	Reims	89	(4)
2011–2013	Tours	60	(3)
2014	BEC Tero Sasana	3	(0)
2014–2016	Paris FC	46	(1)
2016–2018	Bourg-en-Bresse	38	(0)
2019–2024	Fleury	87	(0)
Total		283	(8)

International career
2009–2018	Guadeloupe	12	(1)
- * Club domestic league appearances and goals

Thomas Gamiette (born 21 June 1986) is a Guadeloupean former professional footballer who played as a defensive midfielder in Ligue 2 for Reims, Tours, Paris FC and Bourg-en-Bresse, in the Thai Premier League for BEC Tero Sasana, and in the Championnat National 2 for FC Fleury 91. He made 12 appearances for the Guadeloupe national team, scoring once.

== Career statistics ==
Scores and results list Guadeloupe's goal tally first.

No	Date	Venue	Opponent	Score	Result	Competition
1.	8 October 2014	Stade René Serge Nabajoth, Les Abymes, Guadeloupe	Saint Vincent and the Grenadines	1–0	3–1	2014 Caribbean Cup qualification
