= Eddy Viator =

Guadeloupe footballer (born 1982)

Personal information
- Date of birth: 2 June 1982 (age 44)
- Place of birth: Colombes, France
- Height: 1.80 m (5 ft 11 in)
- Position: Defender

Team information
- Current team: Red Star Baie-Mahault

Senior career*
Years	Team	Apps	(Gls)
2002–2008	Châteauroux	112	(0)
2008	Granada 74	6	(0)
2008–2010	Amiens	60	(0)
2011	Toronto FC	3	(0)
2012	Felda United	15	(0)
2013–2015	KL SPA		
2015–2016	Tampines Rovers	10	(0)
2018–2019	Solidarité-Scolaire		
2019–	Red Star Baie-Mahault		

International career
2009–2018	Guadeloupe	20	(0)
- * Club domestic league appearances and goals as of 18 October 2015

Eddy Viator (born 2 June 1982) is a French footballer who plays as a defender for Guadeloupe club Red Star Baie-Mahault. He made 20 appearances for the Guadeloupe national team.

== Club career ==
Born in Colombes, France, Viator began his career with LB Châteauroux. After only one game in 2002–03, he went on to be regularly used in the following four 1/2 Ligue 2 seasons.

In January 2008, Viator moved to Spain and joined Granada 74 CF in Segunda División, being scarcely used during the campaign and also suffering team relegation. In the following summer, he returned to his country of adoption and signed for Amiens SC, also in the second level, and also being relegated in his first year.

On 20 July 2011, after one year out of professional football, Viator signed with Major League Soccer side Toronto FC, following a period of trial. That same night he made his competitive debut, in a 1–0 home defeat against FC Dallas.

Viator was waived by Toronto on 23 November 2011. In the following year, he signed a one-year contract with Felda United FC in the Malaysia Super League, after the teams in the competition were again allowed to register foreign players.

== International career ==
In 2009, at the age of 27, Viator made his debut with Guadeloupe.
