= David Fleurival =

Guadeloupean footballer (born 1984)

Personal information
- Date of birth: 19 February 1984 (age 42)
- Place of birth: Vitry-sur-Seine, France
- Height: 1.84 m (6 ft 0 in)
- Position: Defensive midfielder

Youth career
- 2001–2003: Tours

Senior career*
Years	Team	Apps	(Gls)
2003–2007	Tours	106	(1)
2007–2008	Boavista	28	(1)
2008–2009	Mons	22	(0)
2009–2010	Châteauroux	26	(1)
2010–2012	Metz	70	(5)
2012–2013	Beira-Mar	25	(0)
2013–2014	Niort	27	(0)
2014–2015	Zawisza Bydgoszcz	5	(0)
2015	AEL	4	(0)
2015–2016	White Star Bruxelles	13	(1)
2016–2018	Differdange 03	48	(1)
2018–2022	Rodange 91	85	(7)
Total		459	(17)

International career
2007–2016	Guadeloupe	24	(2)
- * Club domestic league appearances and goals

David Fleurival (born 19 February 1984) is a French former professional footballer who played as a defensive midfielder. He made 24 appearances for the Guadeloupe national team scoring twice.

== Club career ==
Fleurival played at Tours where he was the team captain and in Portugal with Boavista.

== International career ==
Fleurival made his debut for Guadeloupe at the CONCACAF Gold Cup Finals in June 2007 against Haiti. He also played at the 2008 Caribbean Cup.

== Career statistics ==
=== International ===
Appearances and goals by national team and year
National team	Year	Apps	Goals
Guadeloupe	2007	5	1
Guadeloupe	2008	7	0
Guadeloupe	2009	3	1
Guadeloupe	2011	2	0
Guadeloupe	2014	3	0
Guadeloupe	2016	4	0
Total		24	2

Scores and results list Guadeloupe's goal tally first, score column indicates score after each Fleurival goal.

List of international goals scored by David Fleurival
No.	Date	Venue	Opponent	Score	Result	Competition	Ref.
1	9 June 2007	Miami Orange Bowl, Miami, United States	Canada	2–1	2–1	2007 CONCACAF Gold Cup	
2	5 July 2009	Oakland Coliseum, Oakland, United States	Panama	2–0	2–1	2009 CONCACAF Gold Cup	
