= Richard Socrier =

Guadeloupean-French footballer (born 1979)

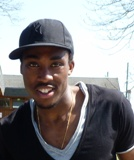

Personal information
- Date of birth: 28 March 1979 (age 47)
- Place of birth: Paris, France
- Height: 1.86 m (6 ft 1 in)
- Position: Striker

Senior career*
Years	Team	Apps	(Gls)
2000–2001	Bourg-Péronnas	32	(8)
2001–2003	Laval	7	(0)
2003–2004	Cherbourg	35	(16)
2004–2005	Metz	23	(2)
2005–2006	Châteauroux	34	(8)
2006–2010	Brest	120	(34)
2010–2012	Ajaccio	56	(14)
2012–2014	Angers	45	(5)
2013	Angers B	3	(1)
2014–2016	Paris	51	(14)
2017–2018	AS Poissy	19	(2)

International career^{‡}
2007–2011	Guadeloupe	8	(1)
- * Club domestic league appearances and goals as of 01:49, 6 February 2018 (UTC) ‡ National team caps and goals as of 29 January 2009

Richard Socrier (born 28 March 1979) is a French-born Guadeloupean former professional footballer, who most recently played as a striker for French club AS Poissy.

== International career ==
Socrier made his debut for Guadeloupe in the group stage of the 2007 CONCACAF Gold Cup against Haiti. In the knockout stage, he scored the second and eventual game-winning goal in a 2–1 quarterfinal victory over Honduras, propelling Guadaloupe to a surprise semifinal berth in its first ever Gold Cup appearance.

== Career statistics ==
=== International ===
Appearances and goals by national team and year
National team	Year	Apps	Goals
Guadeloupe	2007	5	1
Guadeloupe	2011	3	0
Total		8	1

Scores and results list Guadeloupe's goal tally first, score column indicates score after each Socrier goal.

List of international goals scored by Richard Socrier
No.	Date	Venue	Opponent	Score	Result	Competition	Ref.
1	17 June 2007	Reliant Stadium, Houston, United States	Honduras	2–0	2–1	2007 CONCACAF Gold Cup	
