= Franck Grandel =

Guadeloupean footballer (born 1978)

Franck Grandel lottin
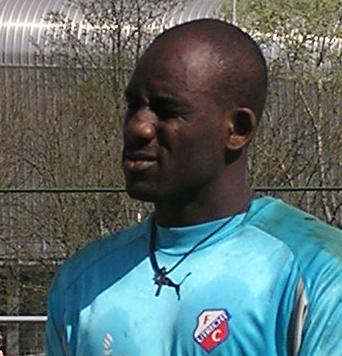
- Grandel with FC Utrecht in 2007

Personal information
- Date of birth: 17 March 1978 (age 48)
- Place of birth: Pointe-à-Pitre, Guadeloupe
- Height: 1.84 m (6 ft 0 in)
- Position: Goalkeeper

Senior career*
Years	Team	Apps	(Gls)
1996–1998	Club Colonial		
1998–1999	Mulhouse	0	(0)
1999–2001	Racing Besançon	15	(0)
2001–2003	Libourne	64	(0)
2003–2004	Skoda Xanthi	16	(0)
2004–2005	Troyes	22	(0)
2005–2008	Utrecht	27	(0)
2009–2011	Dijon	8	(0)
2011–2013	USL Dunkerque	47	(0)
2013–2015	Troyes B	17	(0)
2013–2017	Troyes	2	(0)
2017	→ Boulogne (loan)	1	(0)

International career
2007–2012	Guadeloupe	22	(0)
Medal record
Men's football
Representing Guadeloupe
Caribbean Cup
Third place	2008 Jamaica
- * Club domestic league appearances and goals

Franck Grandel (born 17 March 1978) is a Guadeloupean former professional footballer who played as a goalkeeper.

== Club career ==
Born in Pointe-à-Pitre, Guadeloupe, Grandel started his career with Club Colonial on Martinique. He made his professional debut for Racing Besançon in the Championnat National during the 1999–2000 season.

After two seasons in the club from Franche-Comté, he joined FC Libourne, competing for the championship of the fourth-tier Championnat National 2. He played there for two seasons before moving to Greek club Skoda Xanthi ahead of the 2003–04 season. During the 2004–05 season, he returned to France where he signed for Ligue 2 club Troyes AC. At the end of the season, the club finished in third place in the league and found themselves promoted to the Ligue 1. After this feat was reached, he signed a three-year contract with Dutch Eredivisie club FC Utrecht in 2005, where he was seen as the successor to René Ponk who had left for Sparta Rotterdam. Under the leadership of head coach Foeke Booy, he made his debut in the Eredivisie on 14 August 2005, when FC Utrecht drew 0–0 against NEC Nijmegen. In the course of his first season, Grandel alternated between great saves and several blunders, which mockingly became known as Grandelletjes ("Grandels"). He was released from his contract with Utrecht in November 2007.

He signed a two-year contract with French Ligue 2 side Dijon FCO just before the 2009 CONCACAF Gold Cup. Lacking playing time, he left the club after two seasons.

In 2011, he joined USL Dunkerque in the fourth division with whom he won the Championnat de France Amateur in 2013 and promoted to Championnat National.

In 2013, he returned to Troyes AC, who had just been relegated to Ligue 2, to be the backup. In 2015, the club won the Ligue 2 title, but he failed to make any league appearances that season, or the following season in Ligue 1.

== International career ==
During the 2007 CONCACAF Gold Cup, when Guadeloupe team surprisingly advanced to the tournament semifinals, Grandel was given top goalkeeper award and was also named to the tournament All-star team. He had to leave the 2009 Gold Cup squad because of injury.

== Honours ==
USL Dunkerque

- Championnat de France Amateur: 2012–13

Guadeloupe

- Caribbean Cup : third-place, 2008

Individual

- CONCACAF Gold Cup Top Goalkeeper: 2007
- CONCACAF Gold Cup All-Tournament team: 2007
