= United States men's national soccer team results (2010–2019) =

This is a compilation of every international soccer game played by the United States men's national soccer team from 2010 through 2019. It includes the team's record for that year, each game played during the year, and the date each game was played. It also lists the U.S. goal scorers.

Home team is listed first. U.S. is listed first at home or neutral site.

Records are in win–loss–tie format. Games decided in penalty kicks are counted as ties, as per the FIFA standard.

== 2010 ==
Wins	Losses	Draws
5	5	4

January 23 Friendly	United States	1–3	Honduras	Carson, California
18:00 UTC−08	Conrad (red card) 17'; Goodson 69'		Pavón 19' (pen.); Palacios 37'; Espinoza 52'	Stadium: Home Depot Center; Attendance: 18,626; Referee: Benito Archundia (Mexico)

February 24 Friendly	United States	2–1	El Salvador	Tampa, Florida
19:00 UTC−05	Ching 74'; Kljestan 90'		Corrales 59'	Stadium: Raymond James Stadium; Attendance: 21,737; Referee: Silviu Petrescu (Canada)

March 3 Friendly	Netherlands	2–1	United States	Amsterdam, Netherlands
20:45 UTC+01	Kuyt 40' (pen.); Huntelaar 73'		Bocanegra 88'	Stadium: Amsterdam Arena; Attendance: 46,630; Referee: Cüneyt Çakır (Turkey)

May 25 Friendly	United States	2–4	Czech Republic	East Hartford, Connecticut
20:00 UTC−05	Edu 17'; Gomez 66'		Sivok 44'; Polák 58'; Fenin 78'; Necid 90'	Stadium: Rentschler Field; Attendance: 36,218; Referee: Mauricio Morales (Mexico)

May 29 Friendly	United States	2–1	Turkey	Philadelphia, Pennsylvania
14:00 UTC−05	Altidore 58'; Dempsey 75'		Turan 27'	Stadium: Lincoln Financial Field; Attendance: 55,407; Referee: Silviu Petrescu (Canada)

June 5 Friendly	United States	3–1	Australia	Roodepoort, South Africa
14:30 UTC+02	Buddle 4', 31'; Gomez 90+3'		Cahill 19'	Stadium: Ruimsig Stadium; Attendance: 6,000; Referee: Abdul Ebrahim (South Africa)

June 12 World Cup GS	United States	1–1	England	Rustenburg, South Africa
20:30 UTC+02	Dempsey 40'		Gerrard 4'	Stadium: Royal Bafokeng Stadium; Attendance: 38,646; Referee: Carlos Eugênio Simon (Brazil)

June 18 World Cup GS	United States	2–2	Slovenia	Johannesburg, South Africa
16:00 UTC+02	Donovan 48'; Bradley 82'		Birsa 13'; Ljubijankić 42'	Stadium: Ellis Park Stadium; Attendance: 45,573; Referee: Koman Coulibaly (Mali)

June 23 World Cup GS	United States	1–0	Algeria	Pretoria, South Africa
16:00 UTC+02	Donovan 90+1'		Yahia (yellow card) 76' (yellow-red card) 90+3'	Stadium: Loftus Versfeld Stadium; Attendance: 35,827; Referee: Frank De Bleeckere (Belgium)

June 26 World Cup R16	United States	1–2 (a.e.t.)	Ghana	Rustenburg, South Africa
20:30 UTC+02	Donovan 62' (pen.)		Boateng 5'; Gyan 93'	Stadium: Royal Bafokeng Stadium; Attendance: 34,976; Referee: Viktor Kassai (Hungary)

August 10 Friendly	United States	0–2	Brazil	East Rutherford, New Jersey
20:00 UTC−04			Neymar 28'; Pato 45+1'	Stadium: New Meadowlands Stadium; Attendance: 77,223; Referee: Silviu Petrescu (Canada)

October 9 Friendly	United States	2–2	Poland	Chicago, Illinois
19:00 UTC−06	Altidore 13'; Onyewu 52'		Matuszczyk 28'; Błaszczykowski 73'	Stadium: Soldier Field; Attendance: 31,696; Referee: Steven DePiero (Canada)

October 12 Friendly	United States	0–0	Colombia	Chester, Pennsylvania
20:00 UTC−05				Stadium: PPL Park; Attendance: 8,823; Referee: Roberto García (Mexico)

November 17 Friendly	South Africa	0–1	United States	Cape Town, South Africa
21:30 UTC+02			Agudelo 85'	Stadium: Cape Town Stadium; Attendance: 52,000; Referee: Sylvester Kirwa (Kenya)

== 2011 ==
Wins	Losses	Draws
6	8	3

January 22 Friendly	United States	1–1	Chile	Carson, California
19:00 UTC−08	Bunbury 75' (pen.)	Report	Paredes 53'	Stadium: Home Depot Center; Attendance: 18,580; Referee: Francisco Chacón (Mexico)

March 26 Friendly	United States	1–1	Argentina	East Rutherford, New Jersey
19:00 UTC−04	Agudelo 59'		Cambiasso 42'	Stadium: New Meadowlands Stadium; Attendance: 78,936; Referee: Roberto García (Mexico)

March 29 Friendly	United States	0–1	Paraguay	Nashville, Tennessee
19:00 UTC−05			Cardozo 18'	Stadium: LP Field; Attendance: 29,059; Referee: Jose Benigno (Honduras)

June 4 Friendly	United States	0–4	Spain	Foxborough, Massachusetts
16:30 UTC−4			Cazorla 28', 41'; Negredo 32'; Torres 73'	Stadium: Gillette Stadium; Attendance: 64,121; Referee: Roberto Silvera (Uruguay)

June 7 Gold Cup GS	United States	2–0	Canada	Detroit, Michigan
20:00 UTC−04	Altidore 15'; Dempsey 62'			Stadium: Ford Field; Attendance: 28,209; Referee: Walter López (Guatemala)

June 11 Gold Cup GS	United States	1–2	Panama	Tampa, Florida
20:00 UTC−04	Goodson 68'		Goodson 19' (o.g.); Gómez 36' (pen.)	Stadium: Raymond James Stadium; Attendance: 27,731; Referee: Marco Rodríguez (Mexico)

June 14 Gold Cup GS	United States	1–0	Guadeloupe	Kansas City, Kansas
20:00 UTC−05	Altidore 9'			Stadium: Livestrong Sporting Park; Attendance: 20,109; Referee: Marlon Mejia (El Salvador)

June 19 Gold Cup QF	United States	2–0	Jamaica	Washington, D.C.
15:00 UTC−04	Taylor 49' (o.g.); Dempsey 80'		Taylor (red card) 67'	Stadium: RFK Stadium; Attendance: 45,424; Referee: Marco Rodríguez (Mexico)

June 22 Gold Cup SF	United States	1–0	Panama	Houston, Texas
18:00 UTC−05	Dempsey 76'			Stadium: Reliant Stadium; Attendance: 70,627; Referee: Enrico Wijngaarde (Suriname)

June 25 Gold Cup F	United States	2–4	Mexico	Pasadena, California
18:00 UTC−07	Bradley 8'; Donovan 23'		Barrera 29', 49'; Guardado 36'; G. Dos Santos 76'	Stadium: Rose Bowl; Attendance: 93,420; Referee: Joel Aguilar (El Salvador)

August 10 Friendly	United States	1–1	Mexico	Philadelphia, Pennsylvania
21:00 UTC−05	Rogers 73'		Peralta 17'	Stadium: Lincoln Financial Field; Attendance: 30,138; Referee: Raymond Bogle (Jamaica)

September 2 Friendly	United States	0–1	Costa Rica	Carson, California
20:00 UTC−08			Wallace 65'	Stadium: Home Depot Center; Attendance: 15,798; Referee: José Gaspar (Honduras)

September 6 Friendly	Belgium	1–0	United States	Brussels, Belgium
20:30 UTC±0	Lombaerts 55'			Stadium: King Baudouin Stadium; Attendance: 21,946; Referee: William Collum (Scotland)

October 8 Friendly	United States	1–0	Honduras	Miami Gardens, Florida
18:00 UTC−4	Dempsey 36'			Stadium: Sun Life Stadium; Attendance: 21,170; Referee: Courtney Campbell (Jamaica)

October 11 Friendly	United States	0–1	Ecuador	Harrison, New Jersey
19:15 UTC−4			Ayoví 79'	Stadium: Red Bull Arena; Attendance: 20,707; Referee: Joel Aguilar (El Salvador)

November 11 Friendly	France	1–0	United States	Saint-Denis, France
15:00 UTC+1	Rémy 72'			Stadium: Stade de France; Attendance: 70,018; Referee: Michael Koukoulakis (Greece)

November 15 Friendly	Slovenia	2–3	United States	Ljubljana, Slovenia
12:00 UTC+3	Matavž 26', 61'		Buddle 9'; Dempsey 41'; Altidore 42'	Stadium: Stožice Stadium; Attendance: 8,140; Referee: Robert Schörgenhofer (Austria)

== 2012 ==
Wins	Losses	Draws
9	2	3

January 21 Friendly	United States	1–0	Venezuela	Glendale, Arizona
19:00 UTC−07	Clark 90+7'			Stadium: University of Phoenix Stadium; Attendance: 22,403; Referee: Roberto García (Mexico)

January 25 Friendly	Panama	0–1	United States	Panama City, Panama
20:30 UTC−05			Zusi 8'	Stadium: Estadio Rommel Fernández; Attendance: 15,000; Referee: Francisco Chacón (Mexico)

February 29 Friendly	Italy	0–1	United States	Genoa, Italy
20:30 UTC+01			Dempsey 55'	Stadium: Stadio Luigi Ferraris; Attendance: 15,000; Referee: Fırat Aydınus (Turkey)

May 26 Friendly	United States	5–1	Scotland	Jacksonville, Florida
20:00 UTC−05	Donovan 3', 59', 65'; Bradley 11'; Jones 70'		Cameron 15' (o.g.)	Stadium: EverBank Field; Attendance: 44,438; Referee: Elmer Bonilla (El Salvador)

May 30 Friendly	United States	1–4	Brazil	Landover, Maryland
20:00 UTC−05	Gomez 45'		Neymar 12' (pen.); Silva 26'; Marcelo 52'; Pato 87'	Stadium: FedExField; Attendance: 67,619; Referee: Jeffrey Calderón (Costa Rica)

June 3 Friendly	Canada	0–0	United States	Toronto, Canada
19:00 UTC−05				Stadium: BMO Field; Attendance: 15,247; Referee: Mauricio Morales (Mexico)

June 8 WCQ R3	United States	3–1	Antigua and Barbuda	Tampa, Florida
19:11 UTC−04	Bocanegra 8'; Dempsey 44' (pen.); Gomez 72'		Byers 65'	Stadium: Raymond James Stadium; Attendance: 23,971; Referee: Hugo Cruz (Costa Rica)

June 12 WCQ R3	Guatemala	1–1	United States	Guatemala City, Guatemala
20:00 UTC−06	Pappa 83'		Dempsey 40'	Stadium: Estadio Mateo Flores; Attendance: 18,000; Referee: Joel Aguilar (El Salvador)

August 15 Friendly	Mexico	0–1	United States	Mexico City, Mexico
19:00 UTC−05			Orozco 80'	Stadium: Estadio Azteca; Attendance: 56,000; Referee: Wálter Quesada (Costa Rica)

September 7 WCQ R3	Jamaica	2–1	United States	Kingston, Jamaica
20:30 UTC−05	Austin 23'; Shelton 62'		Dempsey 1'	Stadium: Independence Park; Attendance: 25,000; Referee: Marco Rodríguez (Mexico)

September 11 WCQ R3	United States	1–0	Jamaica	Columbus, Ohio
20:00 UTC−04	Gomez 55'			Stadium: Columbus Crew Stadium; Attendance: 23,881; Referee: Jose Pineda (Honduras)

October 12 WCQ R3	Antigua and Barbuda	1–2	United States	North Sound, Antigua and Barbuda
19:00 UTC−04	Blackstock 25'		Johnson 20', 90'	Stadium: Sir Vivian Richards Stadium; Attendance: 7,000; Referee: Neal Brizan (Trinidad and Tobago)

October 16 WCQ R3	United States	3–1	Guatemala	Kansas City, Kansas
18:00 UTC−06	Bocanegra 10'; Dempsey 18', 36'		Ruiz 5'	Stadium: Livestrong Sporting Park; Attendance: 16,947; Referee: Roberto Moreno (Panama)

November 14 Friendly	Russia	2–2	United States	Krasnodar, Russia
19:00 UTC+04	Smolov 9'; Shirokov 84' (pen.)		Bradley 76'; Diskerud 90+3'	Stadium: Kuban Stadium; Attendance: 28,200; Referee: Nicola Rizzoli (Italy)

== 2013 ==
Wins	Losses	Draws
16	4	3

January 29 Friendly	United States	0–0	Canada	Houston, Texas
20:00 UTC−06				Stadium: BBVA Compass Stadium; Attendance: 11,737; Referee: Raúl Castro (Honduras)

February 6 WCQ R4	Honduras	2–1	United States	San Pedro Sula, Honduras
15:00 UTC−06	García 40'; Bengtson 79'		Dempsey 36'	Stadium: Estadio Olímpico Metropolitano; Attendance: 32,000; Referee: Wálter Quesada (Costa Rica)

March 22 WCQ R4	United States	1–0	Costa Rica	Commerce City, Colorado
22:00 EST	Dempsey 16'			Stadium: Dick's Sporting Goods Park; Attendance: 19,374; Referee: Joel Aguilar (El Salvador)

March 26 WCQ R4	Mexico	0–0	United States	Mexico City, Mexico
22:30 EST				Stadium: Estadio Azteca; Attendance: 85,500; Referee: Walter López (Guatemala)

May 29 Friendly	United States	2–4	Belgium	Cleveland, Ohio
20:00 UTC−06	Cameron 22'; Dempsey 80' (pen.)		Mirallas 6'; Benteke 56', 71'; Fellaini 64'	Stadium: FirstEnergy Stadium; Attendance: 27,720; Referee: Jeffery Solis (Costa Rica)

June 2 Friendly	United States	4–3	Germany	Washington, D.C.
14:30 EDT	Altidore 13'; Ter Stegen 16' (o.g.); Dempsey 60', 64'		Westermann 51'; Kruse 79'; Draxler 81'	Stadium: RFK Stadium; Attendance: 47,359; Referee: Paul Delgadillo (Mexico)

June 7 WCQ R4	Jamaica	1–2	United States	Kingtson, Jamaica
21:30 EDT	Beckford 89'		Altidore 30'; Evans 90+2'	Stadium: Independence Park; Attendance: 12,130; Referee: Roberto Moreno (Panama)

June 11 WCQ R4	United States	2–0	Panama	Seattle, Washington
18:30 PDT	Altidore 36'; Johnson 53'			Stadium: CenturyLink Field; Attendance: 40,847; Referee: Roberto García (Mexico)

June 18 WCQ R4	United States	1–0	Honduras	Sandy, Utah
19:00 MDT	Altidore 73'			Stadium: Rio Tinto Stadium; Attendance: 20,250; Referee: Enrico Wijngaarde (Suriname)

July 5 Friendly	United States	6–0	Guatemala	San Diego, California
20:00 PDT	Gomez 42'; Donovan 55' (pen.), 72'; Wondolowski 71'; Goodson 84'; Bedoya 88'			Stadium: Qualcomm Stadium; Attendance: 25,080; Referee: Valdin Legister (Jamaica)

July 9 Gold Cup GS	United States	6–1	Belize	Portland, Oregon
20:00 PDT	Wondolowski 12', 37', 41'; Holden 58'; Orozco 72'; Donovan 76' (pen.)		Gaynair 40'	Stadium: Jeld-Wen Field; Attendance: 18,724; Referee: Hector Rodriguez (Honduras)

July 13 Gold Cup GS	United States	4–1	Cuba	Sandy, Utah
13:30 MDT	Donovan 45+2' (pen.); Corona 57'; Wondolowski 66', 85'		Alfonso 36'	Stadium: Rio Tinto Stadium; Attendance: 17,597; Referee: David Gantar (Canada)

July 16 Gold Cup GS	United States	1–0	Costa Rica	East Hartford, Connecticut
20:00 EDT	Shea 82'			Stadium: Rentschler Field; Attendance: 25,432; Referee: Courtney Campbell (Jamaica)

July 21 Gold Cup QF	United States	5–1	El Salvador	Baltimore, Maryland
16:00 EDT	Goodson 21'; Corona 29'; Johnson 60'; Donovan 78'; Diskerud 84'		Zelaya 39' (pen.)	Stadium: M&T Bank Stadium; Attendance: 70,540; Referee: Enrico Wijngaarde (Suriname)

July 24 Gold Cup SF	United States	3–1	Honduras	Arlington, Texas
19:00 EDT	Johnson 11'; Donovan 27', 53'		Medina 52'	Stadium: Cowboys Stadium; Attendance: 81,410; Referee: Wálter Quesada (Costa Rica)

July 28 Gold Cup F	United States	1–0	Panama	Chicago, Illinois
16:00 EDT	Shea 69'			Stadium: Soldier Field; Attendance: 57,920; Referee: Joel Aguilar (El Salvador)

August 14 Friendly	Bosnia and Herzegovina	3–4	United States	Sarajevo, Bosnia and Herzegovina
14:30 EDT	Džeko 8', 90'; Ibišević 30'		Johnson 55'; Altidore 59', 84', 86'	Stadium: Asim Ferhatovic Hase Stadium; Attendance: 24,000; Referee: Damir Skomina (Slovenia)

September 6 WCQ R4	Costa Rica	3–1	United States	San José, Costa Rica
20:00 EDT	Acosta 2'; Borges 9'; Campbell 75'		Dempsey 43' (pen.)	Stadium: Estadio Nacional; Attendance: 35,000; Referee: Marco Rodríguez (Mexico)

September 10 WCQ R4	United States	2–0	Mexico	Columbus, Ohio
20:00 EDT	Johnson 49'; Donovan 78'			Stadium: Columbus Crew Stadium; Attendance: 24,584; Referee: Courtney Campbell (Jamaica)

October 11 WCQ R4	United States	2–0	Jamaica	Kansas City, Kansas
17:36 UTC−5	Zusi 77'; Altidore 81'			Stadium: Sporting Park; Attendance: 18,467; Referee: Elmer Bonilla (El Salvador)

October 15 WCQ R4	Panama	2–3	United States	Panama City, Panama
20:30 UTC−5	G. Torres 18'; Tejada 83'		Orozco 64'; Zusi 90+2'; Jóhannsson 90+3'	Stadium: Estadio Rommel Fernández; Attendance: 18,254; Referee: Courtney Campbell (Jamaica)

November 15 Friendly	Scotland	0–0	United States	Glasgow, Scotland
15:00 EST				Stadium: Hampden Park; Attendance: 21,079; Referee: Michael Oliver (England)

November 19 Friendly	Austria	1–0	United States	Vienna, Austria
14:45 EST	Janko 33'			Stadium: Ernst-Happel-Stadion; Attendance: 20,200; Referee: István Vad (Hungary)

== 2014 ==
Wins	Losses	Draws
6	5	4

February 1 Friendly	United States	2–0	South Korea	Carson, California
14:00 PST	Wondolowski 4', 60'	Report		Stadium: StubHub Center; Attendance: 27,000; Referee: Hugo Cruz (Costa Rica)

March 5 Friendly	United States	0–2	Ukraine	Larnaca, Cyprus
14:00 EST		Report	Yarmolenko 12'; Dević 68'	Stadium: Antonis Papadopoulos Stadium; Attendance: 1,573; Referee: Leontios Trattou (Cyprus)

April 2 Friendly	United States	2–2	Mexico	Glendale, Arizona
20:00 MT	Bradley 15'; Wondolowski 28'	Report	Márquez 49'; Pulido 67'	Stadium: University of Phoenix Stadium; Attendance: 59,066; Referee: Roberto Moreno (Panama)

May 27 Friendly	United States	2–0	Azerbaijan	San Francisco, California
19:00 PT	Diskerud 75'; Jóhannsson 81'	Report		Stadium: Candlestick Park; Attendance: 24,688; Referee: Henry Bejarano (Costa Rica)

June 1 Friendly	United States	2–1	Turkey	Harrison, New Jersey
14:00 ET	Johnson 26'; Dempsey 52'	Report	İnan 90' (pen.)	Stadium: Red Bull Arena; Attendance: 26,762; Referee: Slim Jedidi (Tunisia)

June 7 Friendly	United States	2–1	Nigeria	Jacksonville, Florida
18:00 ET	Altidore 31', 68'	Report	Moses 86' (pen.)	Stadium: EverBank Field; Attendance: 52,033; Referee: Mark Clattenburg (England)

June 16 World Cup GS	United States	2–1	Ghana	Natal, Brazil
18:00 ET	Dempsey 1'; Brooks 86'	Report	A. Ayew 82'	Stadium: Arena das Dunas; Attendance: 39,760; Referee: Jonas Eriksson (Sweden)

June 22 World Cup GS	United States	2–2	Portugal	Manaus, Brazil
18:00 ET	Jones 64'; Dempsey 81'	Report	Nani 5'; Varela 90+5'	Stadium: Arena da Amazônia; Attendance: 40,123; Referee: Néstor Pitana (Argentina)

June 26 World Cup GS	United States	0–1	Germany	Recife, Brazil
12:00 ET		Report	Müller 55'	Stadium: Arena Pernambuco; Attendance: 41,876; Referee: Ravshan Irmatov (Uzbekistan)

July 1 World Cup R16	United States	1–2 (a.e.t.)	Belgium	Salvador, Brazil
16:00 ET	Green 107'	Report	De Bruyne 93'; Lukaku 105'	Stadium: Arena Fonte Nova; Attendance: 51,227; Referee: Djamel Haimoudi (Algeria)

September 3 Friendly	Czech Republic	0–1	United States	Prague, Czech Republic
		Report	Bedoya 39'	Stadium: Generali Arena; Attendance: 12,642; Referee: István Vad (Hungary)

October 10 Friendly	United States	1–1	Ecuador	East Hartford, Connecticut
19:00 ET	Diskerud 5'	Report	Valencia 88'	Stadium: Rentschler Field; Attendance: 36,265; Referee: Roberto Moreno (Panama)

October 14 Friendly	United States	1–1	Honduras	Boca Raton, Florida
20:00 EDT	Altidore 10'	Report	M. Figueroa 86'	Stadium: FAU Stadium; Attendance: 14,805; Referee: Yadel Martínez (Cuba)

November 14 Friendly	United States	1–2	Colombia	London, England
19:45 (UTC±00:00)	Altidore 10' (pen.)	Report	Bacca 60'; T. Gutiérrez 87'	Stadium: Craven Cottage; Attendance: 24,235; Referee: Szymon Marciniak (Poland)

November 18 Friendly	Republic of Ireland	4–1	United States	Dublin, Ireland
	Pilkington 7'; Brady 55', 86'; McClean 82'	Report	Diskerud 39'	Stadium: Aviva Stadium; Attendance: 33,332; Referee: Paweł Raczkowski (Poland)

== 2015 ==
Wins	Losses	Draws
10	6	4

January 28 Friendly	Chile	3–2	United States	Rancagua, Chile
20:00 (UTC−3)	Gutiérrez 10'; González 66', 75'	Report	Shea 6'; Altidore 31'	Stadium: Estadio El Teniente; Attendance: 12,420; Referee: Patricio Loustau (Argentina)

February 8 Friendly	United States	2–0	Panama	Carson, California
13:00 PT	Bradley 27'; Dempsey 37'	Report		Stadium: StubHub Center; Attendance: 20,271; Referee: Henry Bejarano (Costa Rica)

March 25 Friendly	Denmark	3–2	United States	Aarhus, Denmark
15:00 ET	Bendtner 33', 83', 90+1'	Report	Altidore 19'; Jóhannsson 66'	Stadium: NRGi Park; Attendance: 10,505; Referee: Mattias Gestranius (Finland)

March 31 Friendly	Switzerland	1–1	United States	Zürich, Switzerland
12:00 ET	Stocker 80'	Report	Shea 45'	Stadium: Stadion Letzigrund; Attendance: 16,100; Referee: Luca Banti (Italy)

April 15 Friendly	United States	2–0	Mexico	San Antonio, Texas
19:30 CT	Morris 49'; Agudelo 72'	Report		Stadium: Alamodome; Attendance: 64,369; Referee: Ricardo Montero (Costa Rica)

June 5 Friendly	Netherlands	3–4	United States	Amsterdam, Netherlands
20:30 (UTC+02:00)	Huntelaar 27', 49'; Depay 53'	Report	Zardes 33'; Brooks 70'; Williams 88'; Wood 90'	Stadium: Amsterdam Arena; Attendance: 46,000; Referee: Martin Strömbergsson (Sweden)

June 10 Friendly	Germany	1–2	United States	Cologne, Germany
20:30 CET (UTC+01:00)	Götze 12'	Report	Diskerud 41'; Wood 87'	Stadium: RheinEnergieStadion; Attendance: 40,348; Referee: Danny Makkelie (Netherlands)

July 3 Friendly	United States	4–0	Guatemala	Nashville, Tennessee
	Castrillo 19' (o.g.); Chandler 58'; Dempsey 72' (pen.); Wondolowski 86'	Report		Stadium: Nissan Stadium; Attendance: 44,835; Referee: Jorge Pérez (Mexico)

July 7 Gold Cup GS	United States	2–1	Honduras	Frisco, Texas
21:30 EDT (UTC−4)	Dempsey 25', 64'	Report	Discua 69'	Stadium: Toyota Stadium; Attendance: 22,357; Referee: César Ramos (Mexico)

July 10 Gold Cup GS	United States	1–0	Haiti	Foxborough, Massachusetts
20:30 EDT (UTC−4)	Dempsey 47'	Report		Stadium: Gillette Stadium; Attendance: 46,720; Referee: Ricardo Montero (Costa Rica)

July 13 Gold Cup GS	United States	1–1	Panama	Kansas City, Kansas
21:30 EDT (UTC−4)	Bradley 55'	Report	Pérez 34'	Stadium: Sporting Park; Attendance: 18,467; Referee: Roberto García (Mexico)

July 18 Gold Cup QF	United States	6–0	Cuba	Baltimore, Maryland
17:00 EDT (UTC−4)	Dempsey 4', 64' (pen.), 78'; Zardes 15'; Jóhannsson 32'; Gonzalez 45'	Report		Stadium: M&T Bank Stadium; Attendance: 37,994; Referee: Henry Bejarano (Costa Rica)

July 22 Gold Cup SF	United States	1–2	Jamaica	Atlanta, Georgia
18:00 EDT (UTC−4)	Bradley 48'	Report	Mattocks 31'; Barnes 36'	Stadium: Georgia Dome; Attendance: 70,511; Referee: Ricardo Montero (Costa Rica)

July 25 Gold Cup 3rd	United States	1–1 (a.e.t.) (2–3 p)	Panama	Chester, Pennsylvania
16:00 EDT (UTC−4)	Dempsey 70'	Report	Nurse 55'	Stadium: PPL Park; Attendance: 12,598; Referee: Óscar Moncada (Honduras)
	Penalties
	Jóhannsson (penalty scored); Dempsey (penalty scored); F. Johnson (penalty missed); Bradley (penalty missed); Beasley (penalty missed)		(penalty scored) R. Torres; (penalty scored) Arroyo; (penalty missed) Cooper; (penalty scored) Cummings

September 4 Friendly	United States	2–1	Peru	Washington, D.C.
19:00 ET	Altidore 59', 68'	Report	Chávez 20'	Stadium: RFK Stadium; Attendance: 28,896; Referee: Francisco Chacón (Mexico)

September 8 Friendly	United States	1–4	Brazil	Foxborough, Massachusetts
20:00 ET	Williams 90+1'	Report	Hulk 9'; Neymar 51' (pen.), 67'; Rafinha 64'	Stadium: Gillette Stadium; Attendance: 29,308; Referee: Joel Aguilar (El Salvador)

October 10 CONCACAF Cup	United States	2–3 (a.e.t.)	Mexico	Pasadena, California
20:30 ET	Cameron 15'; Wood 108'	Report	Hernández 10'; Peralta 96'; Aguilar 118'	Stadium: Rose Bowl; Attendance: 93,723; Referee: Joel Aguilar (El Salvador)

October 13 Friendly	United States	0–1	Costa Rica	Harrison, New Jersey
18:30 (UTC-4)		Report	70' Campbell	Stadium: Red Bull Arena; Attendance: 9,214; Referee: Walter López (Guatemala)

November 13 WCQ R4	United States	6–1	Saint Vincent and the Grenadines	St. Louis, Missouri
	Wood 11'; Johnson 29'; Altidore 31', 74'; Cameron 51'; Zardes 58'	Report	Anderson 5'	Stadium: Busch Stadium; Attendance: 43,433; Referee: Jeffrey Solis (Costa Rica)

November 17 WCQ R4	Trinidad and Tobago	0–0	United States	Port of Spain, Trinidad and Tobago
		Report		Stadium: Hasely Crawford Stadium; Attendance: 22,809; Referee: César Ramos (Mexico)

== 2016 ==
Wins	Losses	Draws
12	6	1

January 31 Friendly	United States	3–2	Iceland	Carson, California
16:00 EST	Altidore 20'; Orozco 59'; Birnbaum 90'	Report	Steindórsson 13'; Sigurðarson 48'	Stadium: StubHub Center; Attendance: 8,803; Referee: Jeffrey Solis (Costa Rica)

February 5 Friendly	United States	1–0	Canada	Carson, California
22:45 EST	Altidore 89'	Report		Stadium: StubHub Center; Attendance: 9,274; Referee: Marlon Mejía (El Salvador)

March 25 WCQ R4	Guatemala	2–0	United States	Guatemala City, Guatemala
22:00 EST	Morales 7'; Ruiz 15'	Report		Stadium: Estadio Mateo Flores; Attendance: 18,313; Referee: Jafeth Perea (Panama)

March 29 WCQ R4	United States	4–0	Guatemala	Columbus, Ohio
19:00 EST	Dempsey 12'; Cameron 35'; Zusi 46'; Altidore 89'	Report		Stadium: Mapfre Stadium; Attendance: 20,624; Referee: Valdin Legister (Jamaica)

May 22 Friendly	Puerto Rico	1–3	United States	Bayamón, Puerto Rico
12:00 EST	Betancur 42'	Report	Ream 20'; Wood 34'; Arriola 56'	Stadium: Juan Ramón Loubriel Stadium; Referee: Kimball Ward (Saint Kitts and Nevis)

May 25 Friendly	United States	1–0	Ecuador	Frisco, Texas
20:00 EST	Nagbe 90'	Report		Stadium: Toyota Stadium; Attendance: 9,893; Referee: José Peñaloza (Mexico)

May 28 Friendly	United States	4–0	Bolivia	Kansas City, Kansas
20:00 EST	Zardes 26', 52'; Brooks 37'; Pulisic 69'	Report		Stadium: Children's Mercy Park; Attendance: 8,894; Referee: Elmer Bonilla (El Salvador)

June 3 Copa América GS	United States	0–2	Colombia	Santa Clara, California
21:30 ET		Report	Zapata 8'; Rodríguez 42' (pen.)	Stadium: Levi's Stadium; Attendance: 67,439; Referee: Roberto García (Mexico)

June 7 Copa América GS	United States	4–0	Costa Rica	Chicago, Illinois
20:00 ET	Dempsey 9' (pen.); Jones 37'; Wood 42'; Zusi 87'	Report		Stadium: Soldier Field; Attendance: 39,642; Referee: Roddy Zambrano (Ecuador)

June 11 Copa América GS	United States	1–0	Paraguay	Philadelphia, Pennsylvania
19:00 ET	Dempsey 27'; Yedlin (yellow card) 46' (yellow-red card) 47'	Report		Stadium: Lincoln Financial Field; Attendance: 51,041; Referee: Julio Bascuñán (Chile)

June 16 Copa América QF	United States	2–1	Ecuador	Seattle, Washington
21:30 ET	Dempsey 22'; Jones (red card) 52'; Zardes 65'	Report	A. Valencia (yellow card) 38' (yellow-red card) 52'; Arroyo 74'	Stadium: CenturyLink Field; Attendance: 47,322; Referee: Wilmar Roldán (Colombia)

June 21 Copa América SF	United States	0–4	Argentina	Houston, Texas
19:00 ET		Report	Lavezzi 3'; Messi 32'; Higuaín 50', 86'	Stadium: NRG Stadium; Attendance: 70,858; Referee: Enrique Caceres (Paraguay)

June 25 Copa América 3rd	United States	0–1	Colombia	Glendale, Arizona
20:00 EST	Orozco (yellow card) 88' (yellow-red card) 90+3'	Report	Bacca 31'; Arias (yellow card) 90+3' (yellow-red card) 90+4'	Stadium: University of Phoenix Stadium; Attendance: 29,041; Referee: Daniel Fedorczuk (Uruguay)

September 2 WCQ R4	Saint Vincent and the Grenadines	0–6	United States	Kingstown, Saint Vincent and the Grenadines
15:30 ET		Report	Wood 28'; Besler 32'; Altidore 43' (pen.); Pulisic 71', 90+2'; Kljestan 78'	Stadium: Arnos Vale Stadium; Attendance: 6,200; Referee: Mathieu Bourdeau (Canada)

September 6 WCQ R4	United States	4–0	Trinidad and Tobago	Jacksonville, Florida
20:00 ET	Kljestan 44'; Altidore 59', 62'; Arriola 71'	Report		Stadium: EverBank Field; Attendance: 19,410; Referee: Ricardo Montero (Costa Rica)

October 7 Friendly	Cuba	0–2	United States	Havana, Cuba
16:00 ET		Report	Wondolowski 62'; Green 71'	Stadium: Estadio Pedro Marrero; Referee: Jafeth Perea (Panama)

October 11 Friendly	United States	1–1	New Zealand	Washington, D.C.
20:00 ET	Green 27'	Report	Patterson 73'	Stadium: RFK Stadium; Attendance: 9,012; Referee: Juan Guerra (Guatemala)

November 11 WCQ R5	United States	1–2	Mexico	Columbus, Ohio
19:45 ET	Wood 49'	Report	Layún 20'; Márquez 89'	Stadium: Mapfre Stadium; Attendance: 24,650; Referee: Walter López (Guatemala)

November 15 WCQ R5	Costa Rica	4–0	United States	San José, Costa Rica
21:00 ET	Venegas 44'; Bolaños 68'; Campbell 74', 78'	Report		Stadium: Estadio Nacional de Costa Rica; Attendance: 35,400; Referee: César Ramos (Mexico)

== 2017 ==
Wins	Losses	Draws
10	2	7

January 29 Friendly	United States	0–0	Serbia	San Diego, California
16:00 ET		Report		Stadium: Qualcomm Stadium; Attendance: 20,079; Referee: Kevin Morrison (Jamaica)

February 3 Friendly	United States	1–0	Jamaica	Chattanooga, Tennessee
19:00 ET	Morris 59'	Report		Stadium: Finley Stadium; Attendance: 17,903; Referee: Jafeth Perea (Panama)

March 24 WCQ R5	United States	6–0	Honduras	San Jose, California
20:30 ET	Lletget 5'; Bradley 27'; Dempsey 32', 49', 54'; Pulisic 46'	Report		Stadium: Avaya Stadium; Attendance: 17,729; Referee: Walter López (Guatemala)

March 28 WCQ R5	Panama	1–1	United States	Panama City, Panama
20:00 ET	Gómez 43'	Report	Dempsey 39'	Stadium: Estadio Rommel Fernández; Attendance: 23,052; Referee: César Ramos (Mexico)

June 3 Friendly	United States	1–1	Venezuela	Sandy, Utah
22:00 ET	Pulisic 61'	Report	Velázquez 29'	Stadium: Rio Tinto Stadium; Attendance: 17,315; Referee: Jeffrey Solis (Costa Rica)

June 8 WCQ R5	United States	2–0	Trinidad and Tobago	Commerce City, Colorado
19:50 ET	Pulisic 52', 62'	Report		Stadium: Dick's Sporting Goods Park; Attendance: 19,188; Referee: Óscar Moncada (Honduras)

June 11 WCQ R5	Mexico	1–1	United States	Mexico City, Mexico
20:30 ET	Vela 23'	Report	Bradley 6'	Stadium: Estadio Azteca; Attendance: 71,537; Referee: Joel Aguilar (El Salvador)

July 1 Friendly	United States	2–1	Ghana	East Hartford, Connecticut
16:45 ET	Dwyer 19'; Acosta 52'	Report	Gyan 60'	Stadium: Rentschler Field; Attendance: 28,754; Referee: Ismael Cornejo (El Salvador)

July 8 Gold Cup GS	United States	1–1	Panama	Nashville, Tennessee
16:30 ET	Dwyer 50'	Report	Camargo 60'	Stadium: Nissan Stadium; Attendance: 47,622; Referee: Fernando Guerrero (Mexico)

July 12 Gold Cup GS	United States	3–2	Martinique	Tampa, Florida
21:00 ET	Gonzalez 53'; Morris 64', 76'	Report	Parsemain 66', 74'	Stadium: Raymond James Stadium; Attendance: 23,368; Referee: Henry Bejarano (Costa Rica)

July 15 Gold Cup GS	United States	3–0	Nicaragua	Cleveland, Ohio
19:00 ET	Corona 37'; Rowe 56'; Miazga 88'	Report	Copete (yellow card) 51' (yellow-red card) 85'	Stadium: FirstEnergy Stadium; Attendance: 27,934; Referee: Melvin Matamoros (Honduras)

July 19 Gold Cup QF	United States	2–0	El Salvador	Philadelphia, Pennsylvania
19:00 ET	Gonzalez 41'; Lichaj 45+2'	Report		Stadium: Lincoln Financial Field; Attendance: 31,615; Referee: Drew Fischer (Canada)

July 22 Gold Cup SF	United States	2–0	Costa Rica	Arlington, Texas
22:00 ET	Altidore 72'; Dempsey 82'	Report		Stadium: AT&T Stadium; Attendance: 45,516; Referee: Joel Aguilar (El Salvador)

July 26 Gold Cup F	United States	2–1	Jamaica	Santa Clara, California
21:30 ET	Altidore 45'; Morris 88'	Report	Watson 50'	Stadium: Levi's Stadium; Attendance: 63,032; Referee: Walter López (Guatemala)

September 1 WCQ R5	United States	0–2	Costa Rica	Harrison, New Jersey
18:55 ET		Report	Ureña 30', 82'	Stadium: Red Bull Arena; Attendance: 26,500; Referee: John Pitti (Panama)

September 5 WCQ R5	Honduras	1–1	United States	San Pedro Sula, Honduras
17:30 ET	Quioto 27'	Report	Wood 85'	Stadium: Estadio Olímpico Metropolitano; Attendance: 38,000; Referee: Joel Aguilar (El Salvador)

October 6 WCQ R5	United States	4–0	Panama	Orlando, Florida
19:00 ET	Pulisic 8'; Altidore 19', 43' (pen.); Wood 63'	Report		Stadium: Orlando City Stadium; Attendance: 25,303; Referee: Roberto García (Mexico)

October 10 WCQ R5	Trinidad and Tobago	2–1	United States	Couva, Trinidad and Tobago
20:00 ET	Gonzalez 17' (o.g.); A. Jones 37'	Report	Pulisic 47'	Stadium: Ato Boldon Stadium; Attendance: 1,500; Referee: Juan Carlos Guerra (Guatemala)

November 14 Friendly	Portugal	1–1	United States	Leiria, Portugal
15:45 ET	Antunes 31'	Report	McKennie 21'	Stadium: Estádio Dr. Magalhães Pessoa; Attendance: 19,107; Referee: Anthony Taylor (England)

== 2018 ==
Wins	Losses	Draws
3	5	3

January 28 Friendly	United States	0–0	Bosnia and Herzegovina	Carson, California
21:30 ET		Report		Stadium: StubHub Center; Attendance: 11,161; Referee: Saíd Martínez (Honduras)

March 27 Friendly	United States	1–0	Paraguay	Cary, North Carolina
19:30 ET	Wood 45' (pen.)	Report		Stadium: WakeMed Soccer Park; Attendance: 9,825; Referee: Kimbell Ward (Saint Kitts and Nevis)

May 28 Friendly	United States	3–0	Bolivia	Chester, Pennsylvania
18:30 ET	Zimmerman 37'; Sargent 52'; Weah 59'	Report		Stadium: Talen Energy Stadium; Attendance: 11,882; Referee: Oshane Nation (Jamaica)

June 2 Friendly	Republic of Ireland	2–1	United States	Dublin, Ireland
15:00 ET	Burke 57'; Judge 90'	Report	Wood 45+1'	Stadium: Aviva Stadium; Attendance: 32,300; Referee: Andrew Dallas (Scotland)

June 9 Friendly	France	1–1	United States	Lyon, France
15:00 ET	Mbappé 78'	Report	Green 44'	Stadium: Groupama Stadium; Attendance: 58,241; Referee: William Collum (Scotland)

September 7 Friendly	United States	0–2	Brazil	East Rutherford, New Jersey
19:30 ET		Report	Firmino 11'; Neymar 43' (pen.)	Stadium: MetLife Stadium; Attendance: 32,489; Referee: Fernando Guerrero (Mexico)

September 11 Friendly	United States	1–0	Mexico	Nashville, Tennessee
20:30 ET	Adams 71'	Report		Stadium: Nissan Stadium; Attendance: 40,194; Referee: Ricardo Montero (Costa Rica)

October 11 Friendly	United States	2–4	Colombia	Tampa, Florida
19:30 ET	Acosta 50'; Wood 53'	Report	Rodríguez 36'; Bacca 56'; Falcao 74'; Borja 79'	Stadium: Raymond James Stadium; Attendance: 38,631; Referee: John Pitti (Panama)

October 16 Friendly	United States	1–1	Peru	East Hartford, Connecticut
	Sargent 49'	Report	Flores 86'	Stadium: Pratt & Whitney Stadium at Rentschler Field; Attendance: 24,959; Referee: Iván Barton (El Salvador)

November 15 Friendly	England	3–0	United States	London, England
15:00 ET	Lingard 26'; Alexander-Arnold 27'; Wilson 77'	Report		Stadium: Wembley Stadium; Attendance: 68,155; Referee: Jesús Gil Manzano (Spain)

November 20 Friendly	United States	0–1	Italy	Genk, Belgium
14:45 ET		Report	Politano 90+4'	Stadium: Luminus Arena; Attendance: 13,500; Referee: Cüneyt Çakır (Turkey)

== 2019 ==
Wins	Losses	Draws
11	5	2

January 27 Friendly	United States	3–0	Panama	Glendale, Arizona
20:00 ET	Mihailovic 40'; Zimmerman 80'; Ramirez 89'	Report		Stadium: State Farm Stadium; Attendance: 9,040; Referee: Adonai Escobedo (Mexico)

February 2 Friendly	United States	2–0	Costa Rica	San Jose, California
15:30 ET	Lletget 80'; Arriola 88'	Report		Stadium: Avaya Stadium; Attendance: 13,656; Referee: Fernando Hernandez (Mexico)

March 21 Friendly	United States	1–0	Ecuador	Orlando, Florida
	Zardes 81'	Report		Stadium: Orlando City Stadium; Attendance: 17,422; Referee: David Gantar (Canada)

March 26 Friendly	United States	1–1	Chile	Houston, Texas
18:55 CDT	Pulisic 4'	Report	Opazo 9'	Stadium: BBVA Compass Stadium; Attendance: 18,033; Referee: Daneon Parchment (Jamaica)

June 5 Friendly	United States	0–1	Jamaica	Washington, D.C.
19:00 ET		Report	Nicholson 60'	Stadium: Audi Field; Attendance: 17,719; Referee: Kimbett Ward (Saint Kitts and Nevis)

June 9 Friendly	United States	0–3	Venezuela	Cincinnati, Ohio
14:00 ET		Report	Rondón 16', 36'; Savarino 30'	Stadium: Nippert Stadium; Attendance: 23,955; Referee: Bryan López (Guatemala)

June 18 Gold Cup GS	United States	4–0	Guyana	Saint Paul, Minnesota
22:00 ET	Arriola 28'; Boyd 51', 81'; Zardes 55'	Report		Stadium: Allianz Field; Attendance: 19,418; Referee: Iván Barton (El Salvador)

June 22 Gold Cup GS	United States	6–0	Trinidad and Tobago	Cleveland, Ohio
22:00 ET	Long 41', 90'; Zardes 66', 69'; Pulisic 73'; Arriola 78'	Report		Stadium: FirstEnergy Stadium; Attendance: 23,921; Referee: Saíd Martínez (Honduras)

June 26 Gold Cup GS	United States	1–0	Panama	Kansas City, Kansas
21:00 ET	Altidore 66'	Report		Stadium: Children's Mercy Park; Attendance: 17,037; Referee: Abdulrahman Al-Jassim (Qatar)

June 30 Gold Cup QF	United States	1–0	Curaçao	Philadelphia, Pennsylvania
20:30 ET	McKennie 25'	Report		Stadium: Lincoln Financial Field; Attendance: 26,233; Referee: Adonai Escobedo (Mexico)

July 3 Gold Cup SF	United States	3–1	Jamaica	Nashville, Tennessee
21:30 ET	McKennie 9'; Pulisic 52', 87'	Report	Nicholson 69'	Stadium: Nissan Stadium; Attendance: 28,473; Referee: Iván Barton (El Salvador)

July 7 Gold Cup F	United States	0–1	Mexico	Chicago, Illinois
21:15 ET		Report	Dos Santos 73'	Stadium: Soldier Field; Attendance: 62,493; Referee: Mario Escobar (Guatemala)

September 6 Friendly	United States	0–3	Mexico	East Rutherford, New Jersey
20:30 ET		Report	J. Hernández 21'; Gutiérrez 78'; Antuna 82'	Stadium: MetLife Stadium; Attendance: 47,960; Referee: Joel Aguilar (El Salvador)

September 10 Friendly	United States	1–1	Uruguay	St. Louis, Missouri
20:00 ET	Morris 79'	Report	B. Rodríguez 50'	Stadium: Busch Stadium; Attendance: 20,625; Referee: Ricardo Montero (Costa Rica)

October 11 Nations League GS	United States	7–0	Cuba	Washington, D.C.
19:00 ET	McKennie 1', 5', 13'; Morris 9'; Ramos 37' (o.g.); Sargent 40'; Pulisic 62' (pen.)	Report		Stadium: Audi Field; Attendance: 13,784; Referee: Jose Torres (Puerto Rico)

October 15 Nations League GS	Canada	2–0	United States	Toronto, Canada
19:30 ET	Davies 63'; Cavallini 90+1'	Report		Stadium: BMO Field; Attendance: 17,126; Referee: Daneon Parchment (Jamaica)

November 15 Nations League GS	United States	4–1	Canada	Orlando, Florida
19:00 ET	Morris 2'; Zardes 23', 89'; Long 34'	Report	Vitória 72'	Stadium: Exploria Stadium; Attendance: 13,103; Referee: César Ramos (Mexico)

November 19 Nations League GS	Cuba	0–4	United States	George Town, Cayman Islands
19:30 ET		Report	Sargent 1', 66'; Morris 26', 39'	Stadium: Truman Bodden Sports Complex; Attendance: 1,966; Referee: John Pitti (Panama)

== See also ==
- United States at the FIFA World Cup
- United States at the CONCACAF Gold Cup
- United States at the Copa América
