= Tim Howard =

American soccer player (born 1979)

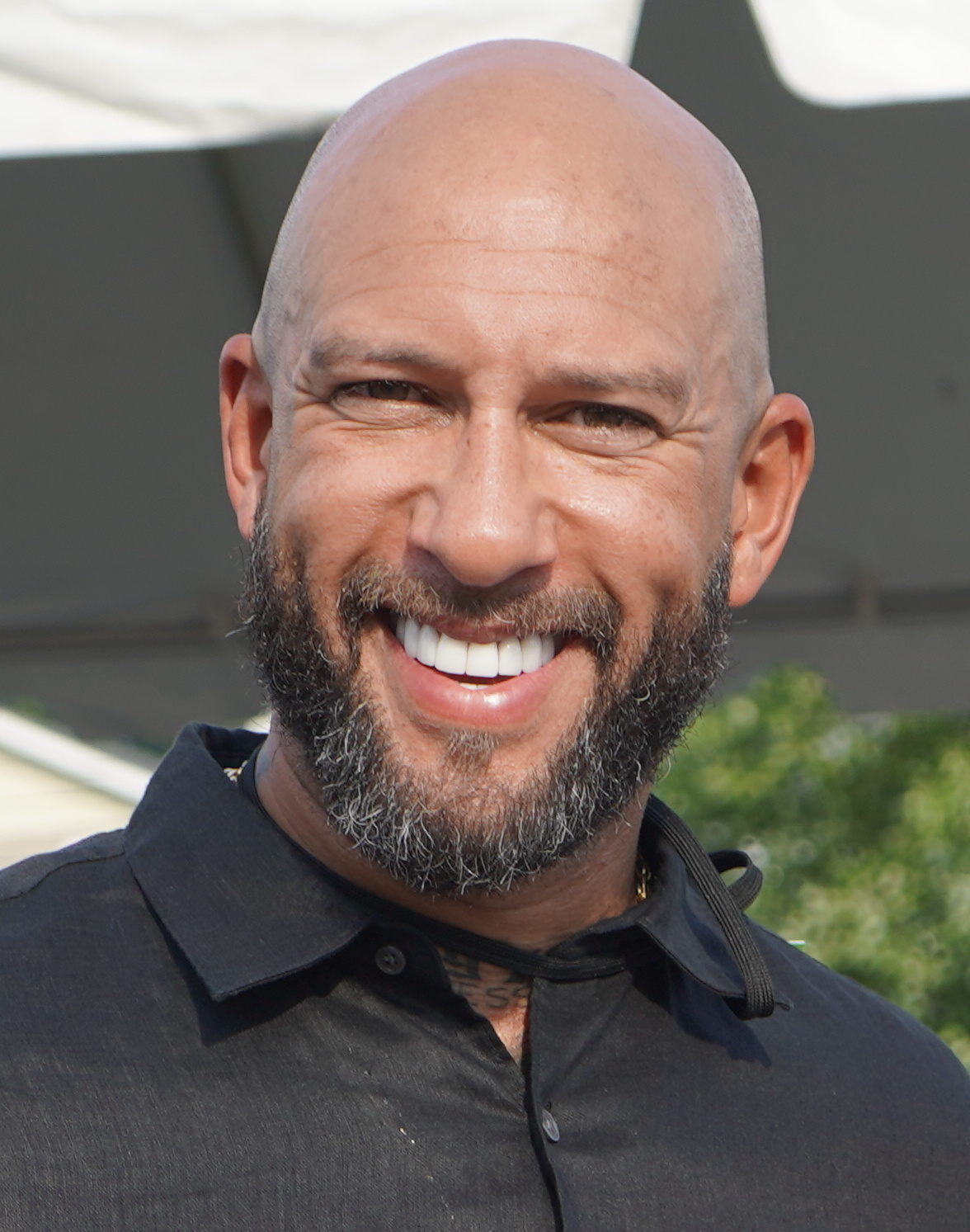
- Howard in 2023

Personal information
- Full name: Timothy Matthew Howard
- Date of birth: March 6, 1979 (age 47)
- Place of birth: North Brunswick, New Jersey, U.S.
- Height: 6 ft 3 in (1.91 m)
- Position: Goalkeeper

Youth career
- 1995–1997: Central Jersey Cosmos

Senior career*
Years	Team	Apps	(Gls)
1997	North Jersey Imperials	6	(0)
1998–2003	MetroStars	88	(0)
1998	→ MLS Pro-40 (loan)	1	(0)
2003–2007	Manchester United	45	(0)
2006–2007	→ Everton (loan)	25	(0)
2007–2016	Everton	329	(1)
2016–2019	Colorado Rapids	100	(0)
2020	Memphis 901	6	(0)
Total		600	(1)

International career
1999	United States U20	3	(0)
1999	United States U23	4	(0)
2002–2017	United States	121	(0)
Medal record
Men's soccer
Representing United States
FIFA Confederations Cup
Runner-up	2009 South Africa
CONCACAF Gold Cup
Winner	2007 United States
Winner	2017 United States
Runner-up	2011 United States
CONCACAF Cup
Runner-up	2015 United States
- * Club domestic league appearances and goals

Timothy Matthew Howard (born March 6, 1979) is an American former professional soccer player who played as a goalkeeper. Nicknamed the "Secretary of Defense", Howard is regarded as one of the greatest American players of all time, and as one of the greatest goalkeepers from the CONCACAF region.

Howard began his career with the North Jersey Imperials, before making a move to the MetroStars. He was signed by English club Manchester United in 2003, replacing Fabian Barthez as the team's first-choice keeper. In his second season at the club, Howard competed for the first-choice spot with Roy Carroll. Howard enjoyed relative success with the club, as they won the 2003 FA Community Shield, the 2003–04 FA Cup and the 2005–06 League Cup. He was listed on the PFA Team of the Year for the 2003–04 season.

After United signed goalkeeper Edwin van der Sar in 2005, Howard would only play once more for United before going on loan to Everton in 2006, and eventually signing permanently with them in February 2007. On January 4, 2012, Howard scored against Bolton Wanderers, making him only the fourth goalkeeper to score a goal in the Premier League. In 2016, Howard made his return to MLS, signing with the Colorado Rapids. He played for three years for the Rapids before hanging up his gloves in October 2019. He became the sporting director of Memphis 901 in January 2020, and came out of retirement to play briefly for the USL Championship side in March 2020.

Howard is the most capped goalkeeper of all-time for the United States men's national team, with 121 appearances from 2002 until his international retirement in 2017. He was an unused substitute for the 2006 FIFA World Cup, but later established himself as first-choice keeper of the United States' international tournament games beginning with the 2009 FIFA Confederations Cup, in which the U.S. ended runner-up against Brazil, and he was awarded the Golden Glove. He started all of the team's 2010 and 2014 FIFA World Cup games. The team reached the Round of 16 on both occasions, and during the latter, Howard set a World Cup record for most saves in a match, with 16 against Belgium. (Note: FIFA's initial match statistics showed 16 saves, and many news sources continue to use this number. The official FIFA statistics were updated on July 5, 2014, to show 15 saves.)

== Early life ==
Howard was born in North Brunswick, New Jersey, the son of African-American truck driver Matthew Howard, and Hungarian packing container distribution worker Esther Howard (née Fekete). His father moved out "before [Howard] formed [his] first memory" and his parents divorced when Howard was three. Afterwards, Howard lived with his mother. Howard was diagnosed with Tourette syndrome and OCD when he was in the sixth grade.

In 1991, before Howard was a teenager, Tim Mulqueen, a one-time assistant coach for the U.S. under-17 soccer team, saw Howard's potential at a single $25 soccer coaching session. He took Howard under his wing by offering him free soccer coaching.

When Howard was 14 and 15 years old, Peter Mellor, the former professional goalkeeper, who was coaching for the United States Soccer Federation and writing the curriculum for the first U.S. Soccer National Goalkeeping License for coaches, saw the 14-year-old Howard in an Olympic Development Player camp, identified him as a star of the future, and placed him in the Olympic Development Program. Mellor also helped Howard obtain his work permit appeal after he joined Manchester United from the MetroStars in 2003.

Howard attended North Brunswick Township High School. Howard proved a star not only in soccer as a midfielder, but also on the basketball court, where he averaged 15 points per game and helped bring his team to the state finals in his senior year. During high school, he played for Central Jersey Cosmos. In 1995, Howard was part of the U.S. under-17 squad.

== Club career ==
In 1997, Mulqueen became the coach of the North Jersey Imperials, a team in the United Systems of Independent Soccer Leagues (USISL), and served as the goalkeeping coach for Major League Soccer (MLS)'s MetroStars; he considered Howard for a position on the Imperials. Howard signed with the Imperials and played in his first professional game before graduating from high school. He notched six appearances with the North Jersey Imperials.

=== MetroStars ===
Howard was brought to the MetroStars by Mulqueen, who at the time, was the MetroStars' goalkeeping coach.

Howard was victorious in his MLS debut with the MetroStars on August 18, 1998, making five saves in a 4–1 win over Colorado at Giants Stadium (his only appearance of the year). He later played in one game with the Nike Project-40 Team, a 3–1 win over the Staten Island Vipers, at Giants Stadium on May 6, 1998.

With the MetroStars during the 1999 MLS season, Howard made eight starts in nine contests. Howard had a 1.58 GAA and won only one match in a season in which the Metros won just seven games. He also spent most of the international season with the United States Under-20 team, leaving the club to compete in the 1999 FIFA World Youth Championship in April and the 1999 Pan American Games in July.

Howard posted a 5–2–2 record with a 1.59 GAA in 2000, splitting time between the MetroStars and the United States Olympic team, also winning all three of his U.S. Open Cup starts that season.

Howard won the 2001 MLS Goalkeeper of the Year award, recording 146 saves and finishing the year with a 1.33 GAA, four shutouts, and a 13–10–3 record. He also received the MLS Humanitarian of the Year Award.

Howard played in 27 of 28 regular season games in 2002 for the MetroStars, recording four clean sheets. He was named to the MLS Best XI for the second straight season. Before leaving the MetroStars in 2003, he appeared in thirteen games, and had three clean sheets as the club challenged for first place during the season's first half.

=== Manchester United ===
Manchester United paid a US$4 million transfer fee to sign Howard in the middle of the 2003 MLS season, and he replaced Fabien Barthez, as the club's first-choice goalkeeper.

Howard started off excellently at Manchester United, saving the decisive penalty in the Community Shield against Arsenal. Other notable performances followed, including Bolton Wanderers and a home FA Cup tie victory over Manchester City. However, in March 2004, Howard's poor parry handed a last minute goal to Porto, eliminating United from the UEFA Champions League. The error appeared to shatter Howard's confidence and he was replaced by Roy Carroll. After a period of rest, Howard reclaimed his starting position ahead of Carroll for the 2004 FA Cup Final, picking up a winner's medal. In doing so, he became the first American to win the FA Cup. Howard was also named in the PFA Team of the Year in his first season at Manchester United.

In Howard's second season with Manchester United, he started poorly, making several errors, and was dropped again for Carroll. After Carroll made several errors as well, Howard regained the starting position, but his performances were unconvincing, leading to Carroll taking over again, playing in the FA Cup final defeat to Arsenal.

At the end of the 2004–05 season, Howard signed a new contract, which was to run until 2009. In the summer of 2005, Manchester United released both of his competitors for the goalkeeper position – Ricardo and Carroll. However, they soon after bought experienced Dutch goalkeeper Edwin van der Sar from Fulham.

=== Everton ===
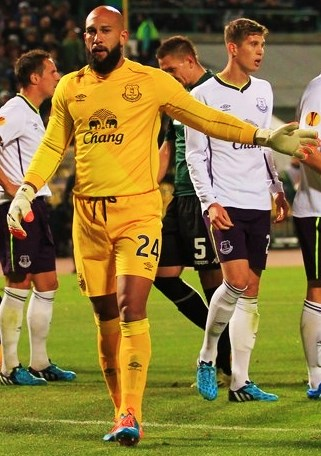
Howard in UEFA Europa League action for Everton against Krasnodar, 2014

Howard joined Everton on loan for the 2006–07 season, and made his debut for the club against Watford on the opening day of the Premier League season. He signed a permanent deal with the club in February 2007 for a fee reported to be worth around £3 million.

Howard made his 100th appearance for Everton against West Ham United, on November 8, 2008. On April 19, 2009, in the FA Cup semi-final, he saved two penalties against his former club Manchester United in a penalty shoot-out to send Everton to the final against Chelsea.

During the 2008–09 Premier League season, Howard set the club record for most league match clean sheets in a season. Howard started the 2009–10 Premier League season with four consecutive clean sheets, including away to Portsmouth, where he helped his team secure a 1–0 win. Howard saved a Jermain Defoe penalty in injury time to help his side draw 2–2 with Tottenham Hotspur on December 6, 2009. Howard captained Everton for the first time in a 3–3 draw with Chelsea at Stamford Bridge on December 12, 2009.

"It was cruel. You saw the back fours and the keepers not being able to believe balls all night, and at the back one wrong step and it can be a nightmare. For our goal I was disappointed from a goalkeepers' union standpoint. You never want to see that happen. It's not nice, it's embarrassing, so I felt for Adam but you have to move on from it."

Tim Howard, on his first goal.

During the 2011–12 Premier League season, Howard scored his first goal in professional soccer in a 2–1 defeat to Bolton Wanderers. His wind-assisted 101-yard clearance at Goodison Park made him only the fourth goalkeeper to score in a Premier League match since its formation in 1992. He described his goal as "cruel" and refused to celebrate out of sympathy/respect for his beaten opposite number, Ádám Bogdán.

In March 2012, Howard agreed on a new contract to keep him at the club until the summer of 2016. On March 2, 2013, Howard's run of 210 consecutive Premier League appearances dating back to September 2007 came to an end as he missed a game against Reading with a finger injury. He was two games short of equaling Neville Southall's club record. In May, Howard kept his 100th clean sheet for Everton in a 0–0 draw against Liverpool in the Merseyside derby.

On December 26, Howard was sent off in a 1–0 defeat to Sunderland, which ended Everton's hopes of remaining an entire calendar year unbeaten at home. In April 2014, Everton extended Howard's contract by two years until 2018.

On February 19, 2016, Everton manager Roberto Martínez confirmed Howard was expected to serve as the backup to Joel Robles. Howard had recently been affected by a knee injury and a loss of form. Before his final match with the club, Howard made a speech before the fans, stating: "I will remain an Evertonian for life. This will always be my team, my club."

=== Colorado Rapids ===
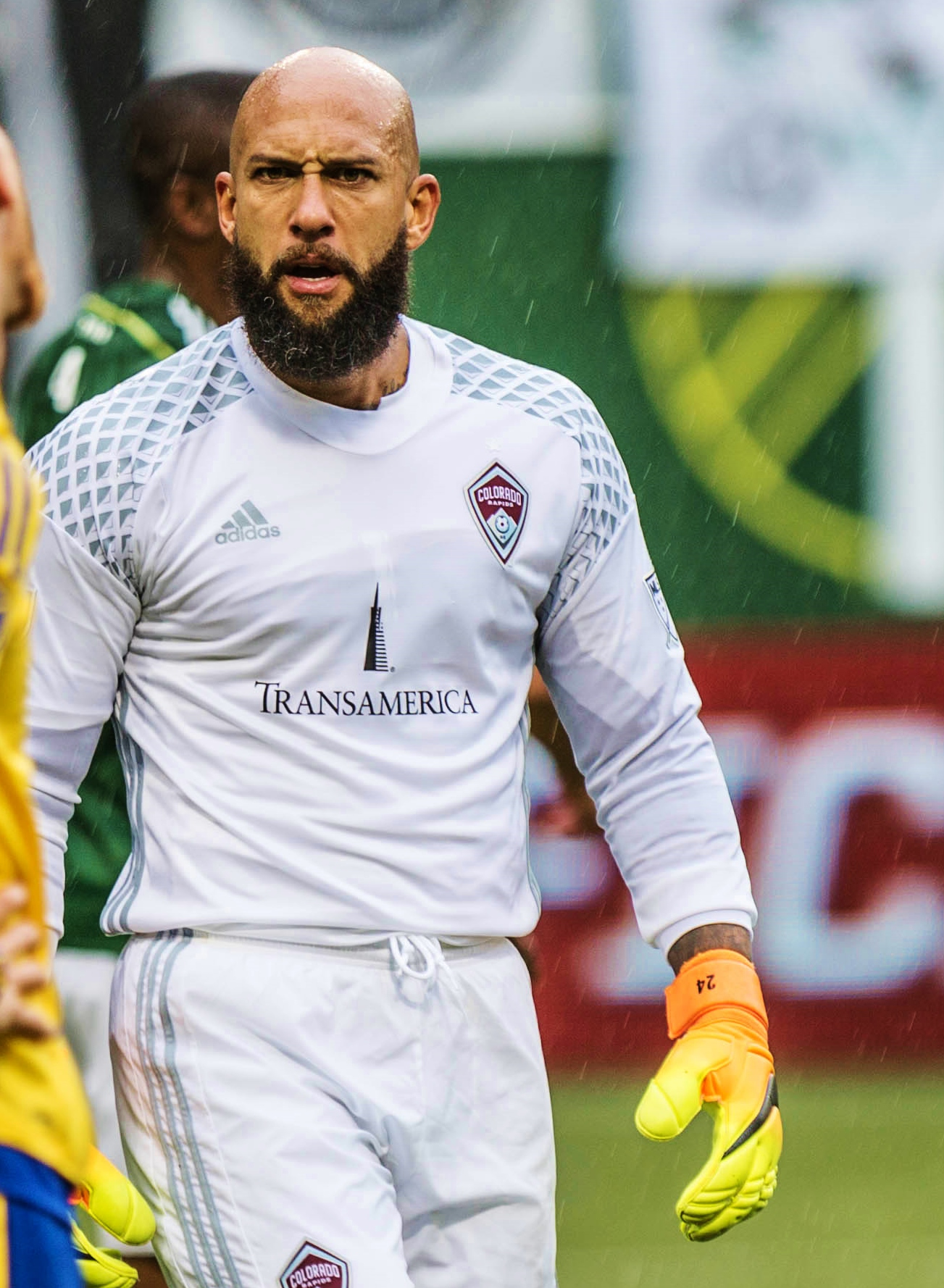
Howard with the Rapids in October 2016

On March 20, 2016, it was announced that Howard would return to MLS and sign a three-and-a-half-year deal with the Colorado Rapids. He would join the team after the MLS transfer window opened on July 4. On June 28, Howard was given the number 1 jersey as he appeared in his first press conference with the club. On November 6, 2016, Howard saved two penalty kicks – with a third also being sent off the crossbar – against the LA Galaxy to send Colorado to the Western Conference Championship.

On January 22, 2019, Howard announced the 2019 Major League Soccer season would be his final season as a professional player. He retired in October 2019.

=== Memphis 901 ===
On March 4, 2020, Howard announced his return to professional soccer, signing a playing contract with Memphis 901 in the USL Championship, where he also served as sporting director and minority owner. Howard stepped down as sporting director for Memphis 901 on June 19, 2024.

== International career ==
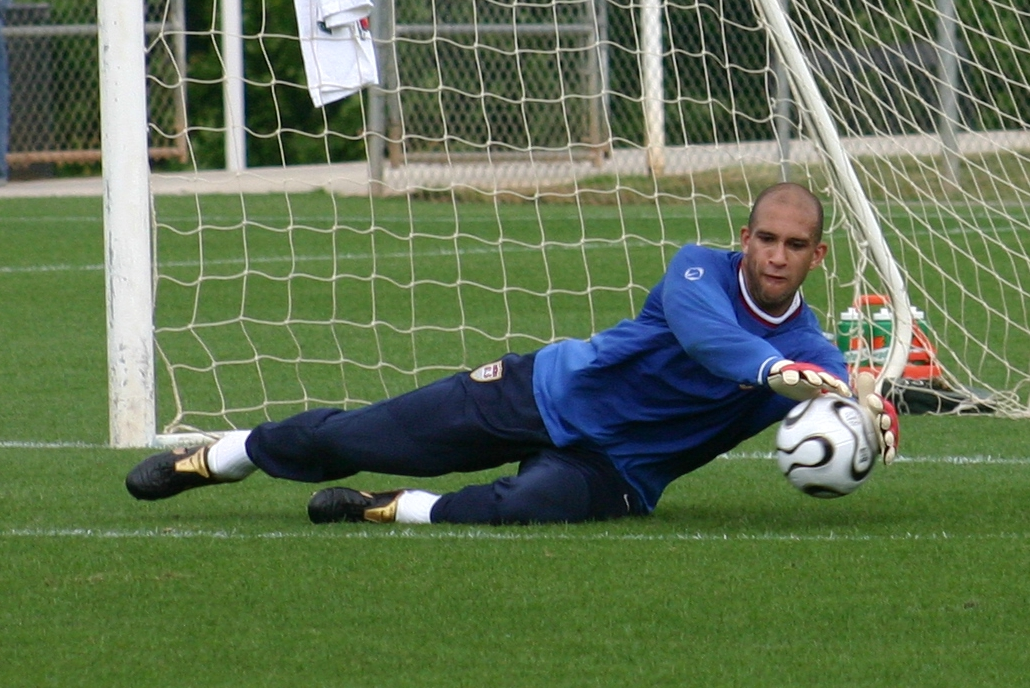
Howard makes a save during training for the U.S. national team, 2006

Howard represented the United States under-20 national team at the 1999 FIFA World Youth Championship in Nigeria, playing in group stage victories over England and Cameroon, before a loss in the Round of 16 against Spain.

In July 1999, Howard was called up for the United States under-23 national team for the 1999 Pan American Games tournament. The United States ended the tournament with a bronze medal having overcome Canada in the Bronze medal match.

Howard was used as a backup to Brad Friedel at the 2000 Summer Olympics. On March 10, 2002, he received his first senior cap, against Ecuador. On May 2, 2006, Howard was named as one of three goalkeepers on the United States roster for the 2006 FIFA World Cup in Germany, but served as a backup to Kasey Keller. Howard became the team's first choice goalkeeper under Bob Bradley and started in the 2007 CONCACAF Gold Cup final, a 2–1 win over Mexico.

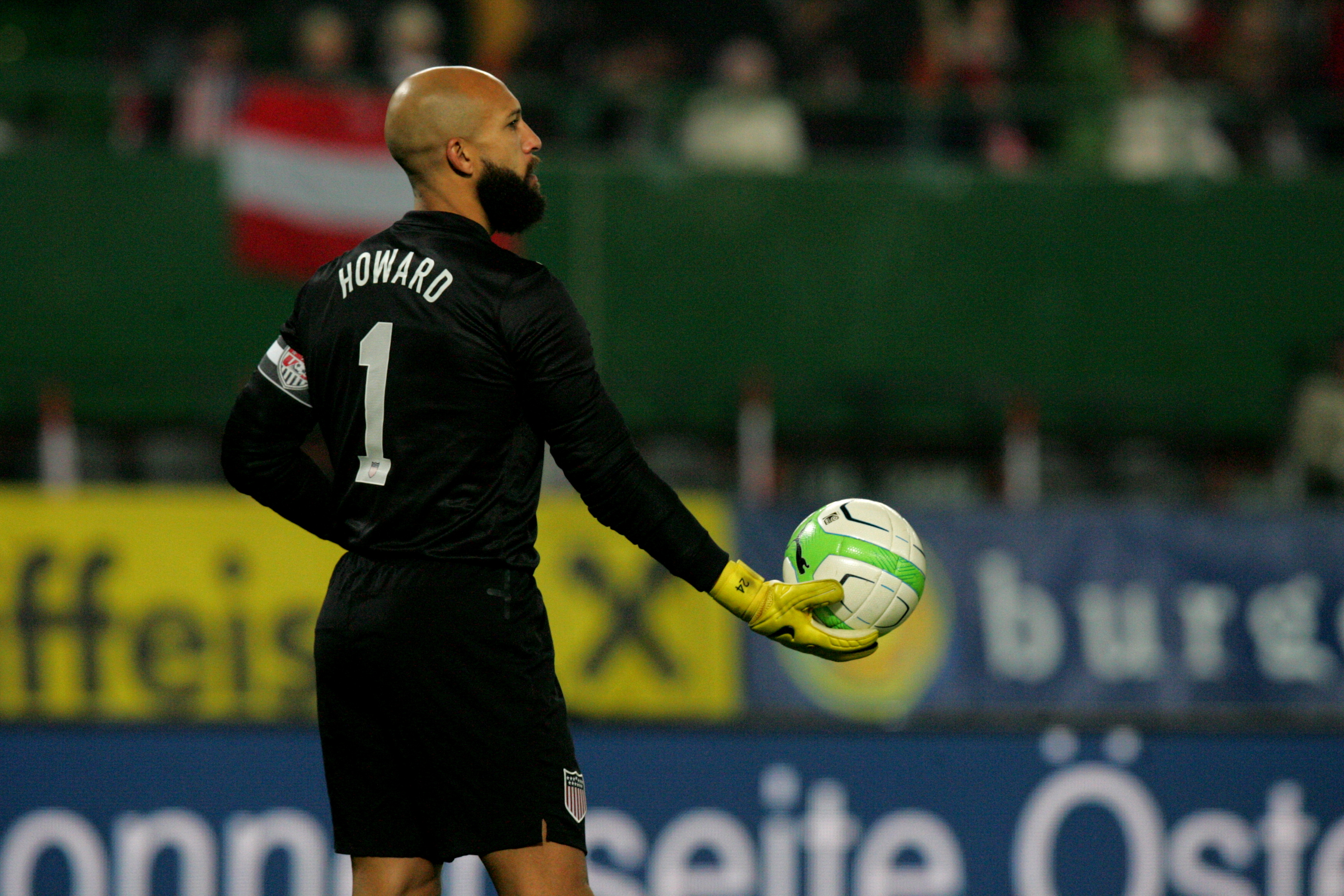
Howard with the U.S. national team against Austria in 2013

Howard was the starting goalkeeper for the 2009 FIFA Confederations Cup, including the semi-final in which the United States upset Spain, then the number one-ranked team in the world. Howard's eight saves earned him his first clean sheet of the tournament and the first shutout of the Spanish side since 2007. Following the United States' second-place finish in the tournament, Howard was awarded the Golden Glove for best goalkeeper.

Howard was the starting goalkeeper for the 2010 World Cup, in South Africa, and turned in a man of the match performance against England in his World Cup debut. Howard's distribution to Landon Donovan led to the game-winning goal of the final group match against Algeria, giving the United States passage into the round of 16. During the United States' round of 16 game against Ghana, Howard conceded two goals in a 2–1 loss.

After Mexico defeated the United States to win the 2011 Gold Cup Final, Howard made a controversial statement regarding the post-match ceremony. The trophy presentation was conducted entirely in Spanish, despite the tournament being held in the United States. Howard went on to say that it was a "disgrace" and commented further that if the final had been in Mexico City and the United States had won, the ceremony would not have been spoken in English.

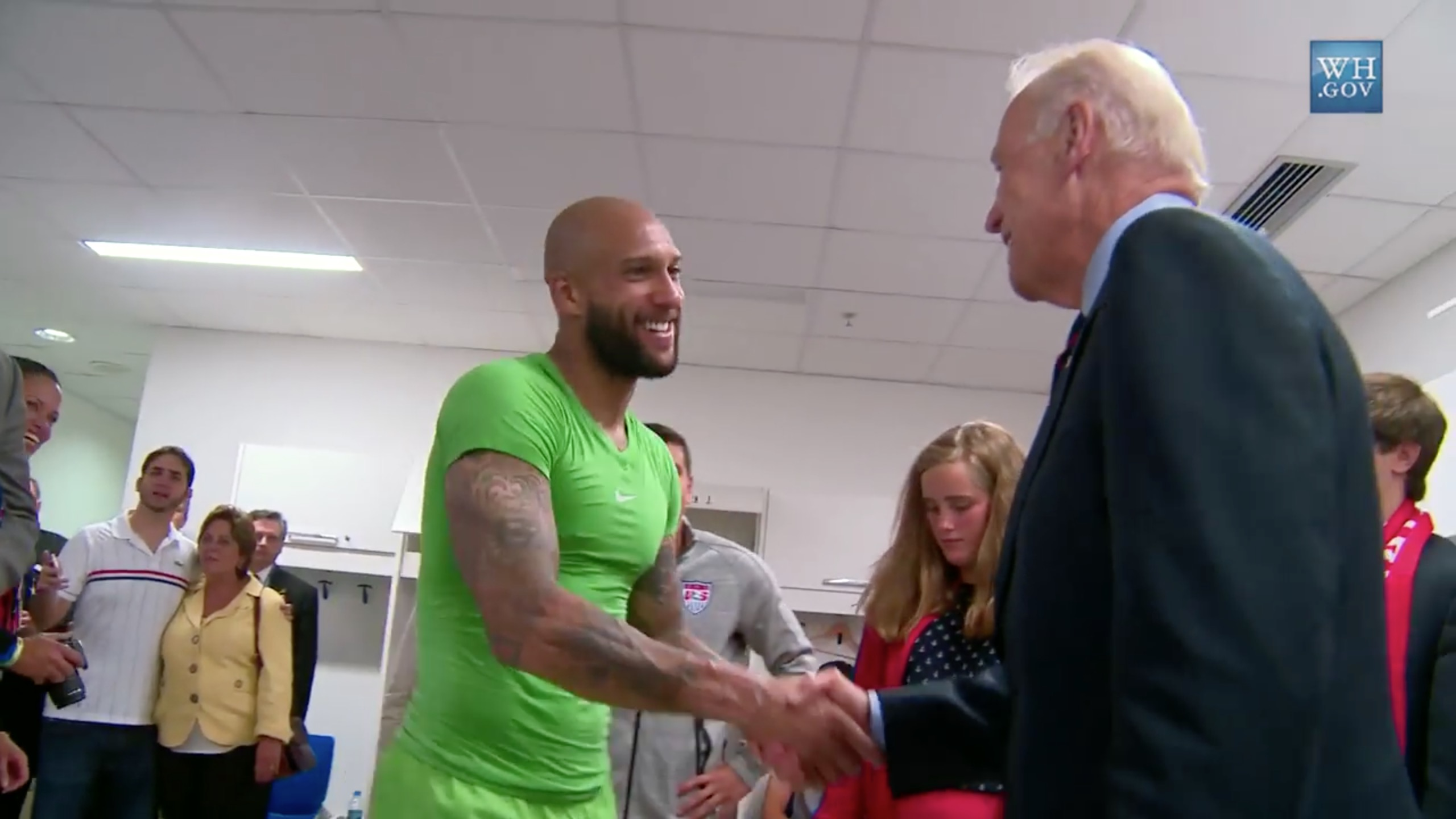
Howard with U.S. Vice President Joe Biden during the 2014 FIFA World Cup.

On June 7, 2014, in the buildup to the 2014 World Cup, Howard received his 100th cap for the United States in a 2–1 defeat of Nigeria. On June 22, Howard was named man of the match for his display during the United States' 2–2 draw with Portugal; his most notable save was a reaction stop to deny Éder, having previously diverted Nani's shot onto the post.

On July 1, Howard was again awarded man of the match, despite the United States losing 2–1 to Belgium after extra time in the round of 16. During the match, he broke the record for most saves in a World Cup match with 15. After breaking this record, his performance was celebrated worldwide on the internet, with the hashtag #ThingsTimHowardCouldSave trending on Twitter.

Following the World Cup, in August 2014, Howard asked U.S. men's national team coach Jürgen Klinsmann to allow him to take a break from international soccer until September 2015; as a result, he missed the 2015 Gold Cup. He was called up again in August 2015, for the team's friendly against Peru on September 4, at the RFK Stadium.

Howard was a member of the team that won the 2017 Gold Cup. However, following the national team's failure to qualify for the 2018 World Cup later that year, after a surprise 2–1 away defeat to Trinidad and Tobago on October 10, he was no longer capped at international level. With 121 appearances, he is the most capped goalkeeper in U.S. men's national team history.

== Personal life ==
Born to a Hungarian mother, Howard also holds a Hungarian passport. He is a cousin of Mia Justus, also a professional soccer goalkeeper. He is a devout Christian and has said, "The most important thing in my life is Christ. He's more important to me than winning or losing or whether I'm playing or not. Everything else is just a bonus." He is also involved with Athletes in Action, a ministry arm of Campus Crusade for Christ.

In 2001, Howard was named MLS Humanitarian of the Year for his work with children with Tourette syndrome, and was added to the New Jersey Tourette Syndrome Association Board of Directors in the same year. In 2014, the U.S. Tourette Syndrome Association described him as the "most notable individual with Tourette syndrome around the world" when he was deemed a "Champion of Hope" for the "tremendous courage he displayed in sharing his story on an international platform, educating the public on a disorder that is so seldom talked about, and encouraging young people living with TS to speak out about their experiences".

In 2014, Howard showed off his arm and torso tattoos for PETA's "Ink, Not Mink" anti-fur campaign.

Howard has been a commentator for NBC Sports since 2020 on Premier League broadcasts.

== Publications ==
Howard's autobiography, The Keeper: A Life of Saving Goals and Achieving Them (ISBN 978-0-06-238739-4), was co-authored with Ali Benjamin and published in 2014. It describes his career and his life with Tourette syndrome and OCD. In the book, Howard says that his neurological makeup gave him an enhanced perception and an ability to hyper-focus that contributed to his success on the field. The New York Times book review said that "few are cooler or quicker than Mr. Howard" and that "the story is good, but reading it require[s] a certain tolerance for sports clichés". The Chicago Tribune describes Howard as the "rarest of creatures – an American soccer hero", adding that the book has "exciting recollections" and that Howard is a "gracious narrator, though here and there he engages in mild score-settling".

== Club ownership ==
In September 2018, Howard became part-owner of English fifth-tier club Dagenham & Redbridge and American second-tier club Memphis 901, along with his partners Peter B. Freund and Craig Unger. It was announced in December 2019 that Howard had taken over as sporting director at Memphis 901, and that he was already handling roster management for the club. Also, in October 2019, it was announced that Howard would be the first international ambassador in the United States for former club Everton.

== Career statistics ==
=== Club ===
Appearances and goals by club, season and competition
Club	Season	League			National cup (Note: Includes U.S. Open Cup, FA Cup)		League cup (Note: Appearances in League/EFL Cup)		Continental		Other		Total	
Club	Season	Division	Apps	Goals	Apps	Goals	Apps	Goals	Apps	Goals	Apps	Goals	Apps	Goals
North Jersey Imperials	1997	USISL D-3	6	0	—		—		—		0	0	6	0
MetroStars	1998	MLS	1	0	0	0	—		—		0	0	1	0
MetroStars	1999	MLS	9	0	0	0	—		—		—		9	0
MetroStars	2000	MLS	9	0	3	0	—		—		0	0	12	0
MetroStars	2001	MLS	26	0	1	0	—		—		3 (Note: Appearances in the MLS Cup Playoffs)	0	30	0
MetroStars	2002	MLS	27	0	1	0	—		—		0	0	28	0
MetroStars	2003	MLS	13	0	0	0	—		—		0	0	13	0
MetroStars	Total		85	0	5	0	—		—		3	0	93	0
MLS Pro-40 (loan)	1998	USISL A-League	1	0	—		—		—		—		1	0
Manchester United	2003–04	Premier League	32	0	4	0	0	0	7 (Note: Appearances in the UEFA Champions League)	0	1 (Note: Appearance in the FA Community Shield)	0	44	0
Manchester United	2004–05	Premier League	12	0	4	0	5	0	5	0	1	0	27	0
Manchester United	2005–06	Premier League	1	0	2	0	3	0	0	0	—		6	0
Manchester United	Total		45	0	10	0	8	0	12	0	2	0	77	0
Everton (loan)	2006–07	Premier League	25	0	1	0	1	0	—		—		27	0
Everton	2006–07	Premier League	11	0	0	0	0	0	—		—		11	0
Everton	2007–08	Premier League	36	0	0	0	3	0	8 (Note: Appearances in the UEFA Cup / UEFA Europa League)	0	—		47	0
Everton	2008–09	Premier League	38	0	7	0	1	0	2	0	—		48	0
Everton	2009–10	Premier League	38	0	2	0	2	0	9	0	—		51	0
Everton	2010–11	Premier League	38	0	4	0	0	0	—		—		42	0
Everton	2011–12	Premier League	38	1	6	0	0	0	—		—		44	1
Everton	2012–13	Premier League	36	0	4	0	0	0	—		—		40	0
Everton	2013–14	Premier League	37	0	0	0	0	0	—		—		37	0
Everton	2014–15	Premier League	32	0	0	0	1	0	9	0	—		42	0
Everton	2015–16	Premier League	25	0	0	0	0	0	—		—		25	0
Everton	Everton total		354	1	24	0	8	0	28	0	—		414	1
Colorado Rapids	2016	MLS	17	0	0	0	—		—		2	0	19	0
Colorado Rapids	2017	MLS	25	0	0	0	—		—		—		25	0
Colorado Rapids	2018	MLS	33	0	0	0	—		1 (Note: Appearance in the CONCACAF Champions League)	0	—		34	0
Colorado Rapids	2019	MLS	25	0	0	0	—		—		0	0	25	0
Colorado Rapids	Total		100	0	0	0	—		1	0	2	0	103	0
Memphis 901	2020	USL Championship	6	0	0	0	—		—		—		6	0
Career total			597	1	39	0	16	0	41	0	7	0	700	1

=== International ===
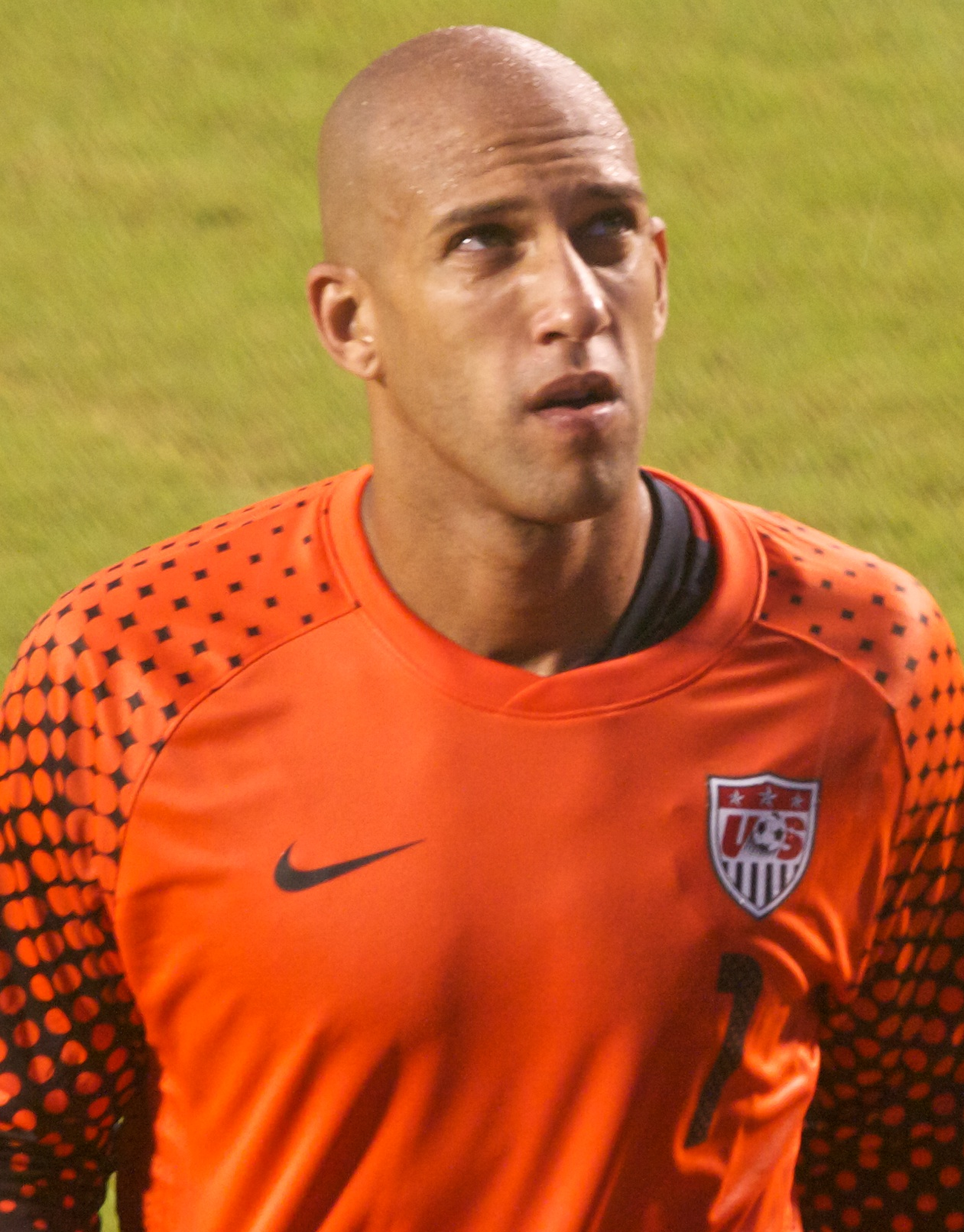
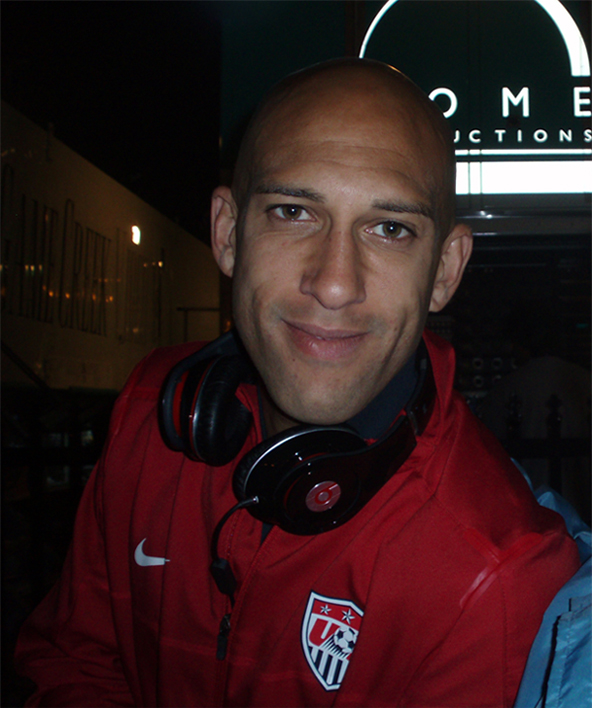
Howard on international duty against Honduras in 2011 (left) and Canada in 2012 (right)

Appearances and goals by national team and year
National team	Year	Apps	Goals
United States	2002	2	0
United States	2003	7	0
United States	2004	3	0
United States	2005	2	0
United States	2006	2	0
United States	2007	10	0
United States	2008	9	0
United States	2009	13	0
United States	2010	9	0
United States	2011	15	0
United States	2012	12	0
United States	2013	12	0
United States	2014	8	0
United States	2015	2	0
United States	2016	5	0
United States	2017	10	0
Total		121	0

== Honors ==
North Jersey Imperials

- Northeast Division Regular Season: 1997

MetroStars

- Eastern Division: 2000

Manchester United

- FA Cup: 2003–04
- Football League Cup: 2005–06
- FA Community Shield: 2003

Everton

- FA Cup runner-up: 2008–09

United States

- FIFA Confederations Cup runner-up: 2009
- CONCACAF Gold Cup: 2007, 2017

Individual

- MLS Goalkeeper of the Year: 2001
- MLS Humanitarian of the Year: 2001
- MLS Best XI: 2001, 2002
- MLS All-Star: 2001, 2002, 2017
- PFA Team of the Year: 2003–04 Premier League
- U.S. Soccer Athlete of the Year: 2008, 2014
- MLS All-Star Game MVP: 2009
- FIFA Confederations Cup Golden Glove: 2009
- CONCACAF Gold Cup Best Save: 2011
- CONCACAF Men's Goalkeeper of the Year: 2013, 2014, 2015
- Fútbol de Primera Player of the Year: 2014
- CONCACAF Best XI: 2015
- New Jersey Hall of Fame: 2024
- National Soccer Hall of Fame: 2024

== See also ==
- List of men's footballers with 100 or more international caps
