= CONCACAF Cup =

2015 CONCACAF Cup
Mexico	United States
(Mexico)	(United States)
3	2
- After extra time
- Date: October 10, 2015
- Venue: Rose Bowl, Pasadena, California
- Referee: Joel Aguilar (El Salvador)
- Attendance: 93,723
- Weather: 36 °C (97 °F)

The CONCACAF Cup (officially the CONCACAF Cup presented by Scotiabank for sponsorship reasons) was an international soccer play-off match to determine CONCACAF's entry into the 2017 FIFA Confederations Cup. 2013 CONCACAF Gold Cup winners the United States played against 2015 Gold Cup winners Mexico on October 10, 2015, at the Rose Bowl in Pasadena, United States.

CONCACAF decided that its representative team in the Confederations Cup would be defined in a single match, in which an official title would also be awarded. Mexico won the match 3–2 after extra time, winning the title and also qualifying for the Confederations Cup.

== Background ==
Even though the CONCACAF Gold Cup took place on a biennial basis, under previous guidelines prior to 2013, only the champions of the Gold Cup that was held two years before the FIFA Confederations Cup qualified as CONCACAF's representative. The decision to face the champions of the two previous editions was made to give the same importance to each edition of the Gold Cup.

CONCACAF announced the introduction of a playoff and super cup match on April 5, 2013, where a trophy would also be awarded. Starting from the 2017 FIFA Confederations Cup, it was planned for the CONCACAF representative to be decided by a play-off between the two Gold Cup champions prior to the Confederations Cup. Then-CONCACAF president Jeffrey Webb stated this would "allow the champion of every single Gold Cup edition to have the same competitive opportunity to represent CONCACAF in the worldwide competition." In the case where the same national team won both Gold Cup editions, the play-off would not have been played, and the team would have qualified directly to the Confederations Cup.

Following CONCACAF's decision to end their affiliation with Traffic Sports USA due to the 2015 FIFA corruption case, Major League Soccer's sister company Soccer United Marketing was chosen as commercial representative for the match.

== Qualification ==
- United States — Qualified as 2013 CONCACAF Gold Cup champions, after beating Panama 1–0 in the final on July 28, 2013.
- Mexico — Qualified as 2015 CONCACAF Gold Cup champions, after beating Jamaica 3–1 in the final on July 26, 2015.

== Format ==
CONCACAF originally announced on July 23, 2015, that the play-off would be played as a single match on October 9, 2015, held in the United States. After the conclusion of the 2015 Gold Cup on July 26, CONCACAF announced the Rose Bowl in Pasadena as the venue. The date was later amended to October 10 in order "to allow fans in attendance to enjoy a day-long of festivities, including Futbol Fiesta, a free, interactive fan zone outside the Rose Bowl."

== Ticketing ==
On August 27, 2015, CONCACAF announced the ticket allocation process for the match. Both the United States Soccer Federation and the Mexican Football Federation received 30% of the tickets each, which was distributed through supporter groups. Another 30% was sold through a lottery where the general public could apply. The final 10% was given to local teams and sponsors. This system was to prevent the crowd being dominated by either team's supporters despite being on U.S. soil similar to previous Gold Cup finals.

== Squads ==
Each team could select up to 23 players for their squad. On September 15, 2015, CONCACAF announced the provisional team lists. The final 23-player squads were announced by CONCACAF on October 5, 2015.

=== Mexico ===
Mexico's final squad was announced on October 1, 2015.

Head coach: (Brazil) Ricardo Ferretti

No.	Pos.	Player	Date of birth (age)	Club
1	GK	Alfredo Talavera	September 18, 1982 (aged 33)	(Mexican Football Federation) Toluca
2	DF	Israel Jiménez	August 13, 1989 (aged 26)	(Mexican Football Federation) Tigres UANL
3	DF	José Rivas	October 18, 1984 (aged 30)	(Mexican Football Federation) Tigres UANL
4	DF	Rafael Márquez	February 13, 1979 (aged 36)	(Italian Football Federation) Hellas Verona
5	DF	Diego Reyes	September 19, 1992 (aged 23)	(Royal Spanish Football Federation) Real Sociedad
6	DF	Jorge Torres Nilo	January 16, 1988 (aged 27)	(Mexican Football Federation) Tigres UANL
7	DF	Miguel Layún	June 25, 1988 (aged 27)	(Portuguese Football Federation) Porto
8	MF	Jonathan dos Santos	April 26, 1990 (aged 25)	(Royal Spanish Football Federation) Villarreal
9	FW	Raúl Jiménez	May 5, 1991 (aged 24)	(Portuguese Football Federation) Benfica
10	MF	Jesús Corona	January 6, 1993 (aged 22)	(Portuguese Football Federation) Porto
11	FW	Carlos Vela	March 1, 1989 (aged 26)	(Royal Spanish Football Federation) Real Sociedad
12	GK	Moisés Muñoz	February 1, 1980 (aged 35)	(Mexican Football Federation) América
13	GK	Jonathan Orozco	May 12, 1986 (aged 29)	(Mexican Football Federation) Monterrey
14	FW	Javier Hernández	June 1, 1988 (aged 27)	(German Football Association) Bayer Leverkusen
15	DF	Héctor Moreno	January 17, 1988 (aged 27)	(Royal Dutch Football Association) PSV Eindhoven
16	MF	Héctor Herrera	April 19, 1990 (aged 25)	(Portuguese Football Federation) Porto
17	MF	Javier Güémez	October 17, 1991 (aged 23)	(Mexican Football Federation) América
18	MF	Andrés Guardado	September 28, 1986 (aged 29)	(Royal Dutch Football Association) PSV Eindhoven
19	FW	Oribe Peralta	January 12, 1984 (aged 31)	(Mexican Football Federation) América
20	MF	Javier Aquino	February 11, 1990 (aged 25)	(Mexican Football Federation) Tigres UANL
21	MF	Carlos Esquivel	April 10, 1982 (aged 33)	(Mexican Football Federation) Toluca
22	DF	Paul Aguilar	March 6, 1986 (aged 29)	(Mexican Football Federation) América
23	MF	Elías Hernández	April 29, 1988 (aged 27)	(Mexican Football Federation) León

=== United States ===
The United States' final squad was announced on October 3, 2015. On October 9, it was announced that Bobby Wood would replace Alejandro Bedoya due to illness.

Head coach: (Germany) Jürgen Klinsmann

No.	Pos.	Player	Date of birth (age)	Club
1	GK	Brad Guzan	September 9, 1984 (aged 31)	(The Football Association) Aston Villa
2	MF	DeAndre Yedlin	July 9, 1993 (aged 22)	(The Football Association) Sunderland
3	DF	Brad Evans	April 20, 1985 (aged 30)	(United States Soccer Federation) Seattle Sounders FC
4	MF	Michael Bradley	July 31, 1987 (aged 28)	(Canadian Soccer Association) Toronto FC
5	DF	Matt Besler	February 11, 1987 (aged 28)	(United States Soccer Federation) Sporting Kansas City
6	DF	Tim Ream	October 5, 1987 (aged 28)	(The Football Association) Fulham
7	DF	DaMarcus Beasley	May 24, 1982 (aged 33)	(United States Soccer Federation) Houston Dynamo
8	FW	Clint Dempsey	March 9, 1983 (aged 32)	(United States Soccer Federation) Seattle Sounders FC
9	MF	Gyasi Zardes	September 2, 1991 (aged 24)	(United States Soccer Federation) LA Galaxy
10	MF	Danny Williams	March 8, 1989 (aged 26)	(The Football Association) Reading
11	FW	Bobby Wood	November 15, 1992 (aged 22)	(German Football Association) Union Berlin
12	GK	Tim Howard	March 6, 1979 (aged 36)	(The Football Association) Everton
13	MF	Jermaine Jones	November 3, 1981 (aged 33)	(United States Soccer Federation) New England Revolution
14	DF	Ventura Alvarado	August 16, 1992 (aged 23)	(Mexican Football Federation) América
15	MF	Kyle Beckerman	April 23, 1982 (aged 33)	(United States Soccer Federation) Real Salt Lake
16	DF	Michael Orozco	February 7, 1986 (aged 29)	(Mexican Football Federation) Tijuana
17	FW	Jozy Altidore	November 6, 1989 (aged 25)	(Canadian Soccer Association) Toronto FC
18	FW	Chris Wondolowski	January 28, 1983 (aged 32)	(United States Soccer Federation) San Jose Earthquakes
19	MF	Graham Zusi	August 18, 1986 (aged 29)	(United States Soccer Federation) Sporting Kansas City
20	DF	Geoff Cameron	July 11, 1985 (aged 30)	(The Football Association) Stoke City
21	DF	Jonathan Spector	March 1, 1986 (aged 29)	(The Football Association) Birmingham City
22	GK	Nick Rimando	June 17, 1979 (aged 36)	(United States Soccer Federation) Real Salt Lake
23	MF	Fabian Johnson	December 11, 1987 (aged 27)	(German Football Association) Borussia Mönchengladbach

== Match summary ==
October 10, 2015
18:35 PDT (UTC−7)

Mexico	3–2 (a.e.t.)	United States
J. Hernández 10'; Peralta 96'; Aguilar 118'	Report	Cameron 15'; Wood 108'

Rose Bowl, Pasadena
Attendance: 93,723
Referee: Joel Aguilar (El Salvador)

Mexico	United States

GK	12	Moisés Muñoz
RB	22	Paul Aguilar	(yellow card) 21'
CB	15	Héctor Moreno	(yellow card) 43'
CB	5	Diego Reyes
LB	7	Miguel Layún
DM	4	Rafael Márquez (c)		(substituted off) 76'
CM	16	Héctor Herrera
CM	18	Andrés Guardado		(substituted off) 80'
RF	14	Javier Hernández		(substituted off) 98'
CF	9	Raúl Jiménez
LF	19	Oribe Peralta	(yellow card) 35'
Substitutes:
GK	1	Alfredo Talavera
GK	13	Jonathan Orozco
DF	2	Israel Jiménez
DF	3	José Rivas		(substituted on) 76'
DF	6	Jorge Torres Nilo
MF	8	Jonathan dos Santos
MF	10	Jesús Corona		(substituted on) 98'
MF	17	Javier Güémez	(yellow card) 95'	(substituted on) 80'
MF	20	Javier Aquino
MF	21	Carlos Esquivel
MF	23	Elías Hernández
FW	11	Carlos Vela
Manager:
(Brazil) Ricardo Ferretti

GK	1	Brad Guzan
RB	23	Fabian Johnson		(substituted off) 111'
CB	20	Geoff Cameron
CB	5	Matt Besler	(yellow card) 52'
LB	7	DaMarcus Beasley
DM	13	Jermaine Jones
DM	15	Kyle Beckerman
CM	4	Michael Bradley (c)	(yellow card) 87'
AM	17	Jozy Altidore		(substituted off) 98'
AM	9	Gyasi Zardes		(substituted off) 78'
CF	8	Clint Dempsey
Substitutes:
GK	12	Tim Howard
GK	22	Nick Rimando
DF	3	Brad Evans		(substituted on) 111'
DF	6	Tim Ream
DF	14	Ventura Alvarado
DF	16	Michael Orozco
DF	21	Jonathan Spector
MF	2	DeAndre Yedlin		(substituted on) 78'
MF	10	Danny Williams
MF	19	Graham Zusi
FW	11	Bobby Wood		(substituted on) 98'
FW	18	Chris Wondolowski
Manager:
(Germany) Jürgen Klinsmann

Assistant referees:
Juan Zumba (El Salvador)
Leonel Leal (Costa Rica)
Fourth official:
Marlon Mejía (El Salvador)

Match rules

- 90 minutes of regular time.
- 30 minutes of extra time if necessary.
- Penalty shoot-out if scores still level.
- Twelve named substitutes, of which up to three may be used.

Match notes

- (yellow card) 35' originally charged to Raúl Jiménez, changed to Oribe Peralta at half-time.

== Abolition of the Confederations Cup ==
A 2019 edition was initially planned, featuring the winners of the 2017 and 2019 Gold Cups. In November 2016, CONCACAF announced that the television rights for the 2019 edition had been sold to Fox Sports. On July 26, 2017, with their victory in the final of the 2017 Gold Cup, the United States ensured they would participate at a minimum in the 2019 CONCACAF Cup should they fail to win the 2019 Gold Cup.

However, on March 15, 2019, FIFA announced that the Confederations Cup would be abolished, with an expanded FIFA Club World Cup taking place instead. This therefore also meant there would be no future editions of the CONCACAF Cup.
