= Fabian Johnson =

Professional soccer player (born 1987)

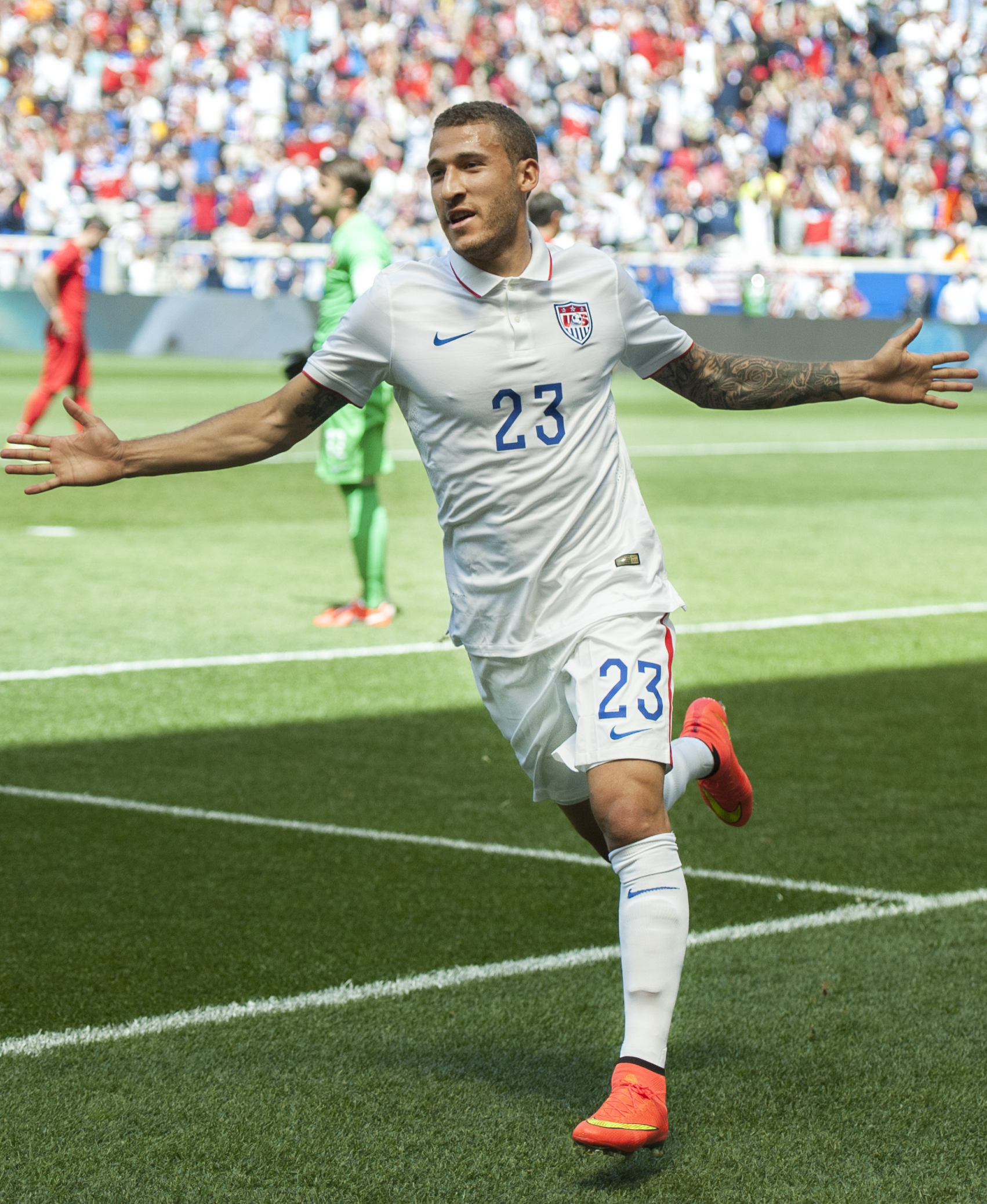
- Johnson playing for the United States in 2014

Personal information
- Full name: Fabian Marco Johnson
- Date of birth: December 11, 1987 (age 38)
- Place of birth: Munich, West Germany
- Height: 6 ft 0 in (1.83 m)
- Positions: Full-back; wide midfielder

Youth career
- 1991–1996: Sportfreunde München
- 1996–2006: 1860 Munich

Senior career*
Years	Team	Apps	(Gls)
2004–2007	1860 Munich II	43	(0)
2006–2009	1860 Munich	90	(4)
2009–2011	VfL Wolfsburg	16	(1)
2011–2014	1899 Hoffenheim	87	(5)
2014–2020	Borussia Mönchengladbach	106	(12)
Total		342	(22)

International career
2003–2004	Germany U17	13	(0)
2004–2005	Germany U18	3	(0)
2005–2006	Germany U19	11	(0)
2006–2007	Germany U20	2	(0)
2007–2009	Germany U21	6	(0)
2011–2017	United States	57	(2)
Medal record
Men's football
Representing United States
CONCACAF Cup
Runner-up	2015 United States
Representing Germany
UEFA European Under-21 Championship
Winner	2009 Sweden
- * Club domestic league appearances and goals

Fabian Marco Johnson (born December 11, 1987) is a former professional soccer player who played as a full-back or wide midfielder. Born in Germany, he represented the United States national team. He also made appearances for Germany at youth level.

== Early and personal life ==
Fabian Marco Johnson was born on December 11, 1987, in Munich, Germany. He is the son of an African-American serviceman and former basketball player who played in Germany, and a German-American mother. In 1991, at the age of four, he started playing soccer at the Sportfreunde München.

== Club career ==
In mid-1996, Johnson moved to the renowned youth ranks of 1860 Munich. Johnson was promoted to the first team of 1860 München in July 2006. He amassed 89 league appearances scoring four goals before transferring to VfL Wolfsburg on July 14, 2009. He scored his first goal for VfL Wolfsburg in a 2–2 draw at home to SC Freiburg. In July 2011, Johnson transferred to 1899 Hoffenheim.

On September 26, 2012, Johnson scored in Hoffenheim's 3–0 victory over VfB Stuttgart, their first win of the new campaign.

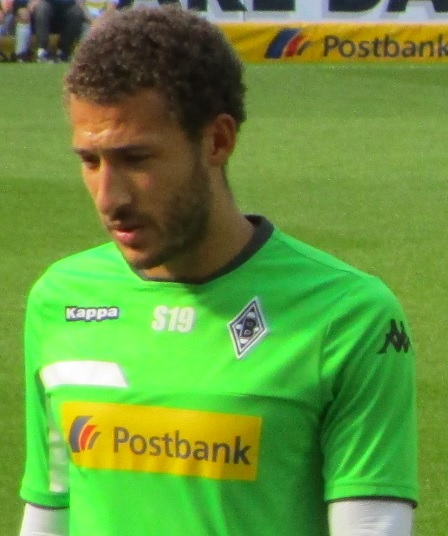
Johnson with Mönchengladbach in 2015

On February 24, 2014, it was confirmed that Johnson would join fellow German side Borussia Mönchengladbach on a free transfer following the conclusion of the 2013–14 season.

On August 23, 2014, Johnson made his first league appearance for Borussia Mönchengladbach, coming on in the 72nd minute of the home match against VfB Stuttgart. On September 13, he made his first league start in a home 4–1 win over FC Schalke 04. He scored his first UEFA Champions League goal on November 3, 2015, against Juventus. He scored his first Bundesliga goal for Mönchengladbach on March 1, 2016, against SC Paderborn.

On June 8, 2020, Mönchengladbach announced that Johnson would depart the club as a free agent at the expiration of his contract.

== International career ==
On August 25, 2011, Johnson was called up to the United States national team by head coach Jürgen Klinsmann for friendly matches with Costa Rica and Belgium on September 2 and 6 respectively. Johnson had represented Germany at youth level, but was eligible for a one-time switch to represent the United States at senior level due to new FIFA eligibility rules; however, he wound up not being able to play as the required paperwork was still pending.

On November 11, 2011, Johnson made his international debut for the United States as a substitute in a 1–0 loss to France. On November 15, Johnson made his first full international start against Slovenia and drew a penalty in a 3–2 win. He played in the 2014 FIFA World Cup qualifying match on June 12, 2012, against Guatemala. Johnson earned his first goal contribution for the national team, notching the assist in the United States' only goal in their 4–1 loss to Brazil on June 23, 2012. He scored his first national team goal on June 1, 2014, in a pre-World Cup friendly against Turkey. Johnson started each of the United States national team's three group stage matches in the 2014 FIFA World Cup as well as the Round of 16 matchup with Belgium. He secured his second national team goal on November 13, 2015, in a World Cup qualifying match against Saint Vincent and the Grenadines.

On March 12, 2019, Johnson spoke with United States' head coach Gregg Berhalter about the possibility of returning to the national team. Johnson has not played for the United States national team since he started in a 2–0 World Cup qualifying loss to Costa Rica on September 1, 2017.

== Career statistics ==
=== Club ===
As of August 12, 2020

Appearances and goals by club, season and competition
Club	Season	League		National cup		Europe		Other		Total	
Club	Season	Apps	Goals	Apps	Goals	Apps	Goals	Apps	Goals	Apps	Goals
1860 Munich	2005–06	4	0	0	0	—		—		4	0
1860 Munich	2006–07	25	0	1	0	—		—		26	0
1860 Munich	2007–08	28	2	3	1	—		—		31	3
1860 Munich	2008–09	33	2	3	0	—		—		36	2
1860 Munich	Total	90	4	7	1	—		—		97	5
VfL Wolfsburg	2009–10	10	1	0	0	1	0	—		11	1
VfL Wolfsburg	2010–11	6	0	1	0	—		—		7	0
VfL Wolfsburg	Total	16	1	1	0	1	0	0	0	18	1
1899 Hoffenheim	2011–12	29	2	4	1	—		—		33	3
1899 Hoffenheim	2012–13	31	3	0	0	—		2	0	33	3
1899 Hoffenheim	2013–14	27	0	1	0	—		—		28	0
1899 Hoffenheim	Total	87	5	5	1	—		2	0	94	6
Borussia Mönchengladbach	2014–15	24	1	3	0	7	0	—		34	1
Borussia Mönchengladbach	2015–16	26	6	3	0	5	2	—		34	8
Borussia Mönchengladbach	2016–17	21	3	3	1	11	0	—		35	4
Borussia Mönchengladbach	2017–18	10	1	2	0	—		—		12	1
Borussia Mönchengladbach	2018–19	18	1	0	0	—		—		18	1
Borussia Mönchengladbach	2019–20	6	0	1	0	0	0	—		7	0
Borussia Mönchengladbach	Total	106	12	12	1	23	2	—		140	15
Career total		299	22	25	3	24	2	2	0	350	27

=== International ===
As of September 10, 2017.

Appearances and goals by national team and year
National team	Year	Apps	Goals
United States
United States	2011	2	0
United States	2012	9	0
United States	2013	8	0
United States	2014	11	1
United States	2015	13	1
United States	2016	11	0
United States	2017	3	0
Total		57	2

Scores and results list United States' goal tally first, score column indicates score after each Johnson goal.

List of international goals scored by Fabian Johnson
No.	Date	Venue	Opponent	Score	Result	Competition	Ref.
1.	June 1, 2014	Red Bull Arena, Harrison, United States	Turkey	1–0	2–1	Friendly	1
2.	November 13, 2015	Busch Stadium, St. Louis, United States	Saint Vincent and the Grenadines	2–1	6–1	2018 FIFA World Cup qualification	2
