= Danny Williams (soccer, born 1989) =

American soccer player (born 1989)

Personal information
- Full name: Daniel Charles Williams
- Date of birth: March 8, 1989 (age 37)
- Place of birth: Karlsruhe, West Germany
- Height: 1.88 m (6 ft 2 in)
- Position: Midfielder

Youth career
- 1998–2004: Karlsruher SC
- 2004–2008: SC Freiburg

Senior career*
| Years | Team | Apps | (Gls) |
| 2008–2011 | SC Freiburg II | 60 | (4) |
| 2010–2011 | SC Freiburg | 14 | (0) |
| 2011–2013 | 1899 Hoffenheim | 45 | (1) |
| 2013–2017 | Reading | 135 | (13) |
| 2017–2019 | Huddersfield Town | 25 | (0) |
| 2019–2020 | Pafos | 11 | (0) |
| Total | | 290 | (18) |

International career
| 2005 | Germany U15 | 3 | (1) |
| 2011–2017 | United States | 23 | (2) |
Medal record
Men's soccer
Representing United States
CONCACAF Cup
| Runner-up | 2015 United States |
- * Club domestic league appearances and goals

Daniel Charles Williams (born March 8, 1989) is a former professional soccer player who played as a midfielder. Born in Germany, he played for the United States national team.

== Early life ==
Born in Karlsruhe, West Germany, Williams is the son of an African American father and German mother. His father is originally from North Carolina, and was stationed in Heidelberg while serving in the United States military. Williams is a citizen of both Germany and the United States.

== Club career ==
=== SC Freiburg ===
Williams began his career in 1998 with the Karlsruher SC youth setup and played from July 2004 for the SC Freiburg youth and reserve sides.

He made his Bundesliga debut for the Freibrug first team on January 22, 2010, against Stuttgart. He would go on to make nine appearances for Freiburg in 2010, two of them being starts.

=== 1899 Hoffenheim ===
Williams joined the Bundesliga club Hoffenheim on August 31, 2011. During his first appearance for the club on September 10, 2011, he made an assist in a 4–0 Hoffenheim victory over Mainz.

=== Reading ===
On June 25, 2013, it was confirmed that Williams joined Reading in the English Championship on a four-year contract. On August 3, Williams made his debut in the season opener against Ipswich Town. He came on as a sub in the second half as Reading won the game 2–1. He scored his first goal for the club on February 1, 2014, in a 3–0 win against Millwall.

=== Huddersfield Town ===
On July 4, 2017, Williams signed a two-year contract with newly promoted Premier League side Huddersfield Town after rejecting a new contract with Reading. He made his league debut against Crystal Palace in a 3–0 win. He scored his first goal for Huddersfield in an FA Cup tie against Bolton Wanderers on 6 January 2018. On May 17, 2019, Huddersfield announced that they were releasing Williams at the end of the season.

=== Pafos ===
On September 6, 2019, Williams signed for Pafos of the Cypriot First Division. On May 18, 2020, Pafos announced that Williams had left the club by mutual termination of his contract.

== International career ==
Williams represented the Germany under-15 team. However, due to FIFA regulations concerning dual citizenship, he remained eligible to play at the senior level for either Germany or the United States.

On September 30, 2011, Williams obtained an American passport, making him eligible to play for the United States national team. He was called up by the United States team for two friendlies in October 2011, and made his first appearance for the U.S. on October 8, 2011, in a 1–0 victory against Honduras. Williams was the first player to earn his first national team cap under the Americans' new head coach Jürgen Klinsmann. On June 5, 2015, Williams scored his first international goal in Amsterdam in a friendly against the Netherlands. The goal was an equalizer for the United States who had been trailing 3–1 against the Dutch. The United States went on to win the game 4–3. On September 8, 2015, he scored a goal in a friendly against Brazil which ended in a 4–1 defeat.

== Personal life ==
Outside of football, Williams established streetwear brand Beautiful Struggles in 2019.

== Career statistics ==
=== Club ===
As of match played March 8, 2020

Appearances and goals by club, season and competition
| Club | Season | League | | | National cup | | League cup | | Other | | Total | |
| Club | Season | Division | Apps | Goals | Apps | Goals | Apps | Goals | Apps | Goals | Apps | Goals |
|---|---|---|---|---|---|---|---|---|---|---|---|---|
| SC Freiburg II | 2008–09 | Regionalliga Süd | 33 | 2 | — | | — | | — | | 33 | 2 |
| SC Freiburg II | 2009–10 | Regionalliga Süd | 21 | 2 | — | | — | | — | | 21 | 2 |
| SC Freiburg II | 2010–11 | Regionalliga Süd | 6 | 0 | — | | — | | — | | 6 | 0 |
| SC Freiburg II | Total | | 60 | 4 | — | | — | | — | | 60 | 4 |
| SC Freiburg | 2009–10 | Bundesliga | 6 | 0 | 0 | 0 | — | | — | | 6 | 0 |
| SC Freiburg | 2010–11 | Bundesliga | 7 | 0 | 2 | 0 | — | | — | | 9 | 0 |
| SC Freiburg | 2011–12 | Bundesliga | 1 | 0 | 0 | 0 | — | | — | | 1 | 0 |
| SC Freiburg | Total | | 14 | 0 | 2 | 0 | — | | — | | 16 | 0 |
| 1899 Hoffenheim | 2011–12 | Bundesliga | 24 | 0 | 3 | 0 | — | | — | | 27 | 0 |
| 1899 Hoffenheim | 2012–13 | Bundesliga | 21 | 1 | 0 | 0 | — | | — | | 21 | 1 |
| 1899 Hoffenheim | Total | | 45 | 1 | 3 | 0 | — | | — | | 48 | 1 |
| Reading | 2013–14 | Championship | 30 | 3 | 1 | 0 | 1 | 0 | — | | 32 | 3 |
| Reading | 2014–15 | Championship | 25 | 1 | 6 | 0 | 0 | 0 | — | | 31 | 1 |
| Reading | 2015–16 | Championship | 39 | 5 | 4 | 1 | 3 | 0 | — | | 46 | 6 |
| Reading | 2016–17 | Championship | 41 | 4 | 1 | 0 | 2 | 0 | 3 (Note: Appearances in the Championship play-offs) | 0 | 47 | 4 |
| Reading | Total | | 135 | 13 | 12 | 1 | 6 | 0 | 3 | 0 | 156 | 14 |
| Huddersfield Town | 2017–18 | Premier League | 20 | 0 | 3 | 1 | 1 | 0 | — | | 24 | 1 |
| Huddersfield Town | 2018–19 | Premier League | 5 | 0 | 0 | 0 | 1 | 0 | — | | 6 | 0 |
| Huddersfield Town | Total | | 25 | 0 | 3 | 1 | 2 | 0 | — | | 30 | 1 |
| Pafos | 2019–20 | Cypriot First Division | 11 | 0 | 0 | 0 | — | | — | | 11 | 0 |
| Career total | | | 291 | 18 | 20 | 2 | 8 | 0 | 3 | 0 | 322 | 20 |

=== International ===
As of match played November 14, 2017

Appearances and goals by national team and year
| National team | Year | Apps | Goals |
|---|---|---|---|
| United States | 2011 | 4 | 0 |
| United States | 2012 | 7 | 0 |
| United States | 2013 | 1 | 0 |
| United States | 2014 | 1 | 0 |
| United States | 2015 | 6 | 2 |
| United States | 2016 | 3 | 0 |
| United States | 2017 | 1 | 0 |
| Total | | 23 | 2 |

Scores and results list United States' goal tally first, score column indicates score after each Williams goal.

List of international goals scored by Danny Williams
| No. | Date | Venue | Opponent | Score | Result | Competition | Ref. |
|---|---|---|---|---|---|---|---|
| 1 | June 5, 2015 | Amsterdam Arena, Amsterdam, Netherlands | Netherlands | 3–3 | 4–3 | Friendly | |
| 2 | September 8, 2015 | Gillette Stadium, Foxborough, United States | Brazil | 1–4 | 1–4 | Friendly | |

== Honors ==
Huddersfield Town

- EFL Championship play-offs: 2017

United States

- CONCACAF Cup runner-up: 2015
