= Brad Evans (soccer) =

American soccer player

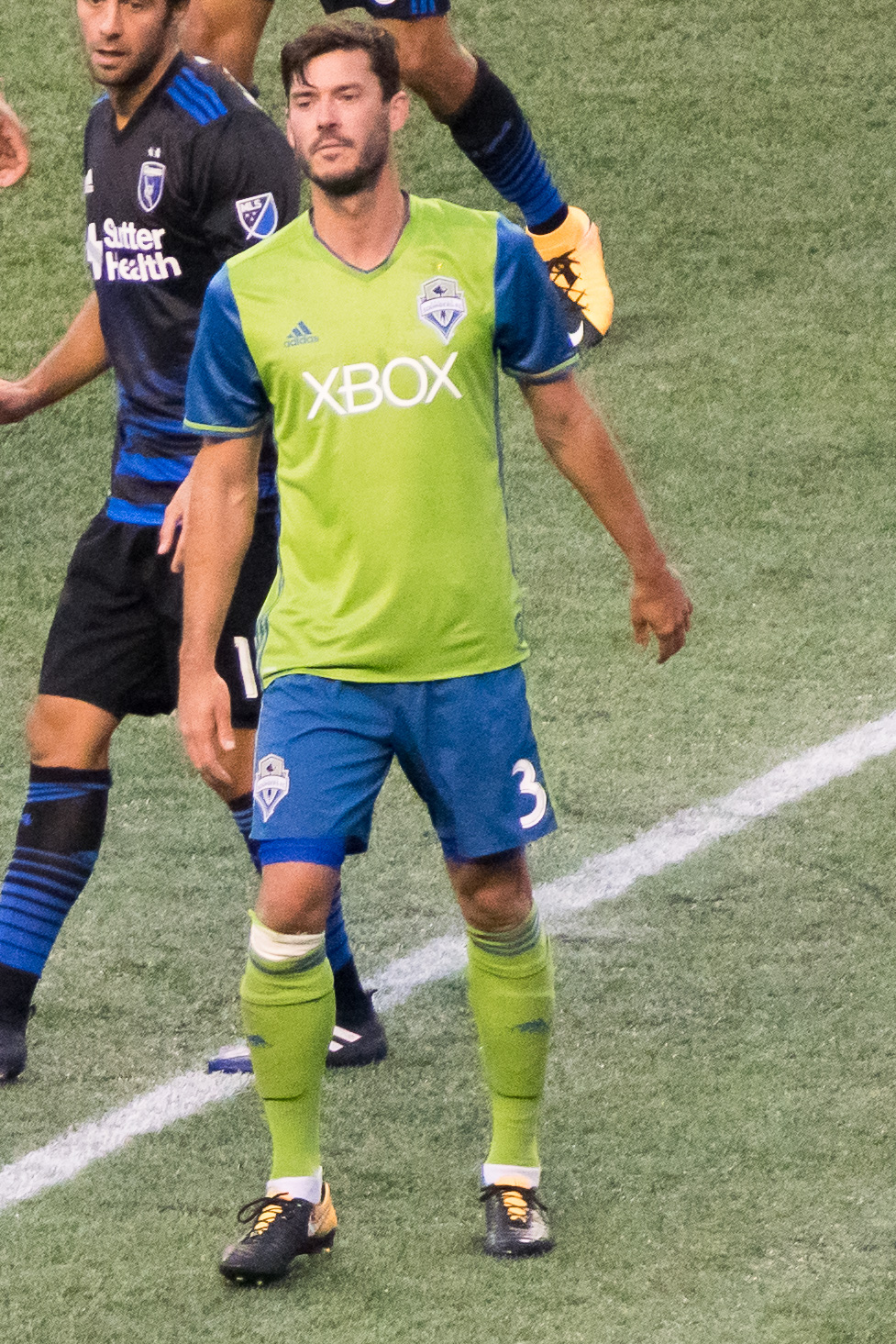
- Evans in 2017

Personal information
- Full name: Bradley Ray Evans
- Date of birth: April 20, 1985 (age 41)
- Place of birth: Phoenix, Arizona, United States
- Height: 1.86 m (6 ft 1 in)
- Positions: Midfielder; defender

Youth career
- 1993–2003: Tempe Warriors

College career
Years	Team	Apps	(Gls)
2003–2006	UC Irvine Anteaters	75	(31)

Senior career*
Years	Team	Apps	(Gls)
2004–2006	Orange County Blue Star	15	(7)
2007–2008	Columbus Crew	30	(5)
2009–2017	Seattle Sounders FC	200	(20)
2018	Sporting Kansas City	0	(0)
2018	→ Swope Park Rangers (loan)	4	(0)
Total		249	(32)

International career
2005	United States U20	5	(0)
2009–2017	United States	27	(1)
- * Club domestic league appearances and goals

Bradley Ray Evans (born April 20, 1985) is an American retired professional soccer player who played as a midfielder. He is now a color commentator for radio broadcasts of Seattle Sounders FC matches.

Born in Phoenix, Evans was drafted out of University of California, Irvine in the second round of the 2007 MLS SuperDraft by the Columbus Crew, where he stayed for two seasons before being selected in the Expansion Draft by the Sounders in 2008. He won "Player of the Week" honors in October 2012 for a two-goal performance against FC Dallas. Evans has appeared five times for the under-20 national team in the 2005 FIFA World Youth Championship, and 27 times for the senior national team, including the 2009 Gold Cup.

== Early life and career ==
Evans was born to Tom and Dawn Grippando in Phoenix, Arizona, where he was raised with his brother and two sisters. Evans attended Mountain Pointe High School and played 4 seasons for the school's team, scoring 54 goals. He was named all-state and team captain during his junior and senior seasons. He also played 10 seasons for the Tempe Warriors youth club. He is married to wife Becky, supports Liverpool, and admires Zinedine Zidane. The midfielder attended the University of California, Irvine and majored in social sciences with a minor in education while playing college soccer. Playing for the UC Irvine Anteaters, Evans scored a record 31 goals during his four-year career and graduated as the school's career leader in total points, at 73. He won Big West Offensive Player of the Year in 2005 and 2006 and was an All-American in 2006.

Evans played with Orange County Blue Star in the Premier Development League during the college off-season alongside future Sierra Leonean international Kei Kamara and future U.S. international Sacha Kljestan. Evans played 6 matches during the 2004 season and scored 4 goals. He played a single match during the 2005 season, scoring in a 1–0 win over the San Diego Gauchos at UC Irvine. Evans appeared 8 times during his final season with Blue Star, scoring twice in wins over Los Angeles and Bakersfield.

== Club career ==
=== Columbus Crew ===
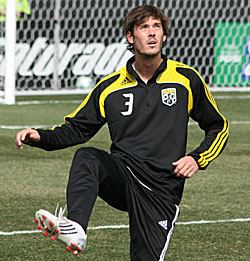
Brad Evans in pre-match warm-ups with the Columbus Crew, 2008

During the 2007 MLS SuperDraft, Evans was drafted by the Columbus Crew in the second round (15th overall). Coach Sigi Schmid described him as versatile and Columbus' fortune that Evans only played the first of three combine games due to injury. The midfielder made his MLS debut on April 7 against the New York Red Bulls, and appeared for 3 more matches without scoring a goal in the 2007 season. Evans played in 26 games for the Crew during the 2008 season and scored the final goal in a 3–2 win over the San Jose Earthquakes in May for his first MLS goal. The midfielder went on to score 4 more goals, including the MLS Goal of the Week during the final week of the regular season in a 1–0 win over D.C. United. He helped Columbus win the MLS Cup, starting in all 4 playoff games and scoring in a 2–0 win over the Kansas City Wizards in the Conference Semifinals. Evans started and played minutes during the MLS Cup final, a 3–1 win over the New York Red Bulls on November 23.

=== Seattle Sounders FC ===
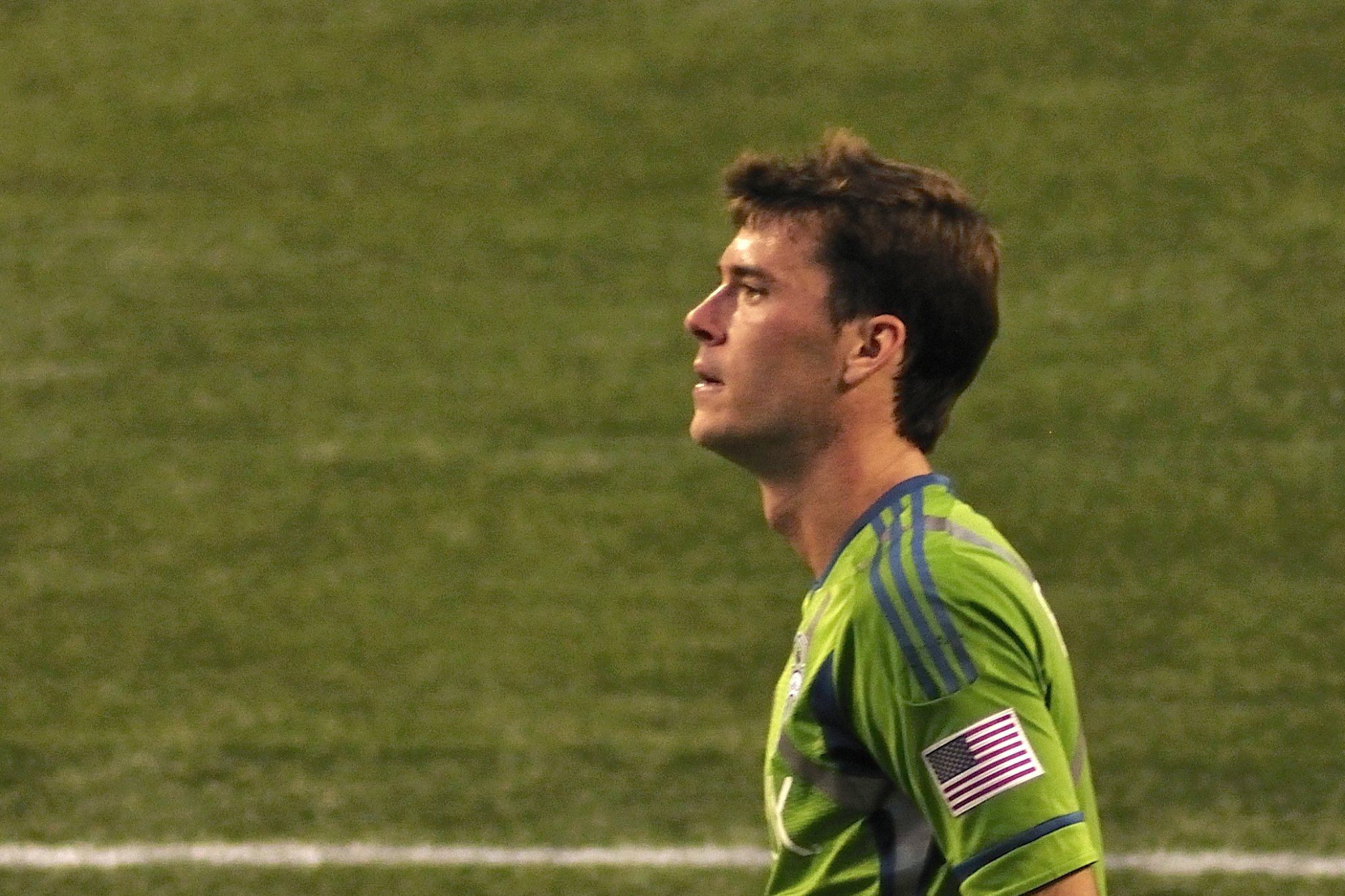
Playing for the Sounders in 2011

Three days after winning the MLS Cup, Evans was selected by Seattle Sounders FC with the tenth pick in the Expansion Draft, later being reunited with coach Sigi Schmid. He started the first match in club history on March 19, a 3–0 win over the New York Red Bulls as he scored the second goal in the 24th minute from a Fredy Montero pass, finishing between the legs of New York goalkeeper Danny Cepero to begin the 2009 season. Evans became a regular starter for the first-year Sounders, starting 27 of his 29 MLS appearances and scored two more goals, against San Jose in April and FC Dallas in October, to finish as the team's 4th top goalscorer, behind Montero, Nate Jaqua, and Steve Zakuani. Evans played in the last 12 minutes of the U.S. Open Cup Final as the Sounders won their first trophy by defeating a 10-man D.C. United 2–1 on September 2. He also played in both playoff matches as the Sounders lost 1–0 on aggregate to the Houston Dynamo in the Conference Semifinal.

Evans began the 2010 season by scoring in a 2–0 win over the expansion team Philadelphia Union in the 12th minute from a pass from Steve Zakuani. Evans would not score for the rest of the season in MLS play, but assisted on Michael Fucito's goal in a 1–0 over the Kansas City Wizards in April via a throw-in and on Steve Zakuani's goal in a 3–0 win over the New England Revolution. After a 3–2 loss to D.C. United in June, Evans suffered a knee injury and was forced to not play until the next season. The midfielder returned for the 2011 season and played 71 minutes in a 1–1 draw with the Houston Dynamo in late March, missing the first 2 matches of the season. He earned "Team of the Week" honors for a two-goal and assist performance against Toronto FC on April 30. He scored the following weekend in a 2–1 loss at D.C. United from a penalty earned by Fredy Montero, and he later scored in his first Champions League match, a 4–1 win over Comunicaciones in Group D on August 16. Evans contributed his fourth league goal, his third from a penalty, in a 3–1 win at Vancouver Whitecaps FC to clinch the Cascadia Cup. Evans assisted an Álvaro Fernández goal against Chivas USA before playing both games of the MLS Cup playoffs, where the Sounders lost 3–2 on aggregate to Real Salt Lake. Evans finished with a career-high 5 goals and 5 assists in all competitions and ranked 3rd in both goals and assists in MLS play.

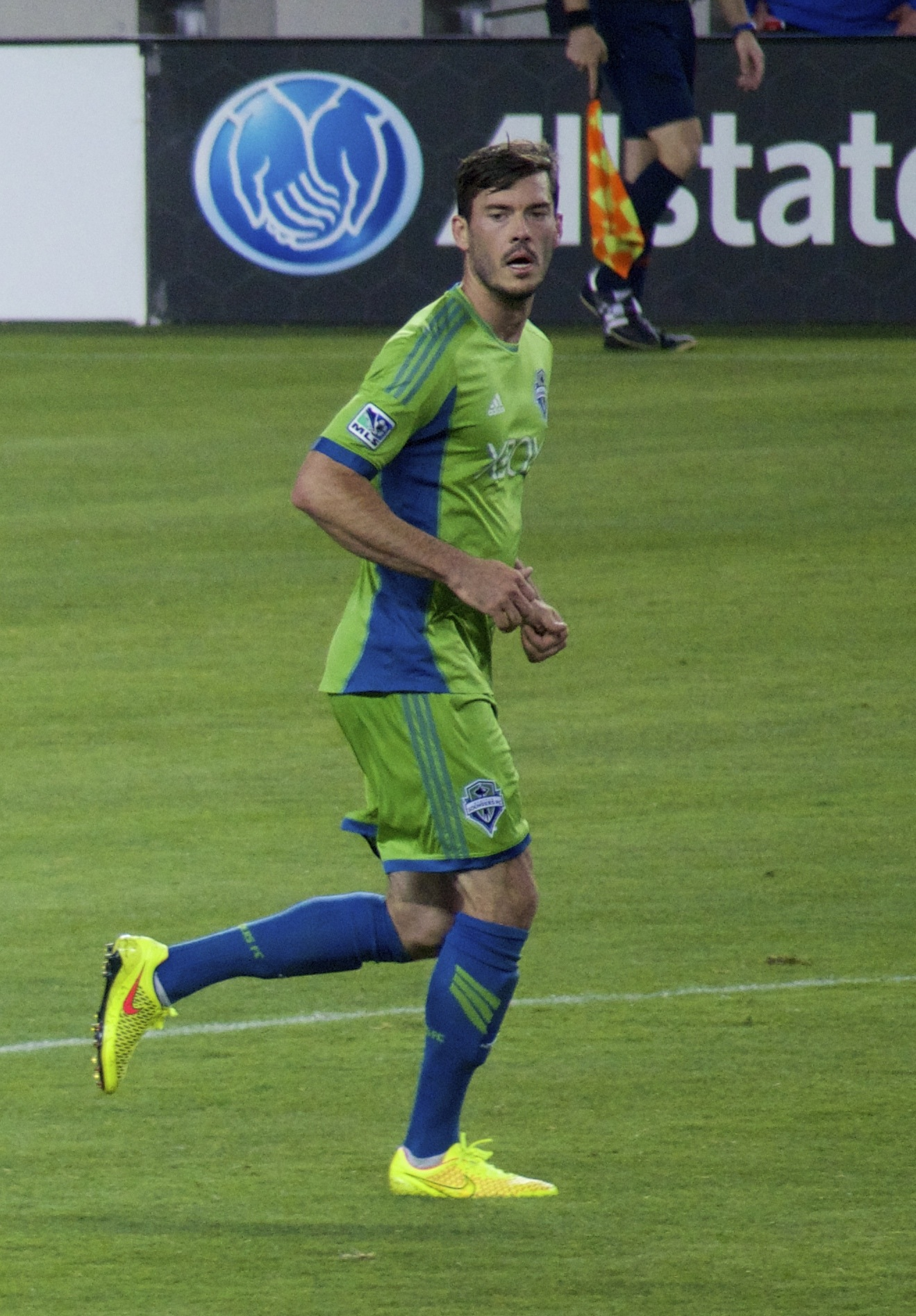
Playing for the Sounders in 2014

Evans began the 2012 season by scoring in the Champions League quarterfinals in a 2–1 win over Santos Laguna, later losing 7–3 on aggregate and being eliminated from the tournament. He was initially named a secondary captain behind Mauro Rosales, but declined in favor of giving the vice-captaincy to Fredy Montero. Evans started the first two matches of the MLS season in March and scored in a 2–0 win over Houston from a penalty before injuring his hamstring and missing the next match, a 1–0 loss to San Jose. The midfielder scored a goal in a 4–1 Open Cup semifinal victory over Chivas USA and provided an assist in a 2–2 draw with New York in July; as well as recording an assist in a 2–0 win over the Vancouver Whitecaps, and a goal in a 6–2 win over Chivas USA in August. He also scored the game-winning goal in a 3–2 win over Marathón in September to qualify for the quarterfinals of the Champions League. Evans earned his first "Player of the Week" award for playing as a defender after Zach Scott's red card 30 minutes into an eventual 0–0 draw with Real Salt Lake and 2 goals in a 3–1 win over Dallas. He played 90 minutes in all 4 MLS Cup Playoff matches as the Sounders advanced to the Conference Final for the first time in franchise history, but lost 3–2 on aggregate to eventual champions Los Angeles Galaxy. The midfielder played for the Sounders in 29 MLS matches and totaled 4 goals and 4 assists, with 39 appearances and 6 goals in all competitions.

At the end of the 2017 season, Evans became a free agent.

=== Sporting Kansas City ===
On February 20, 2018, Evans joined Sporting Kansas City as a free agent. He announced his retirement as an active player on December 17, 2018.

== International career ==
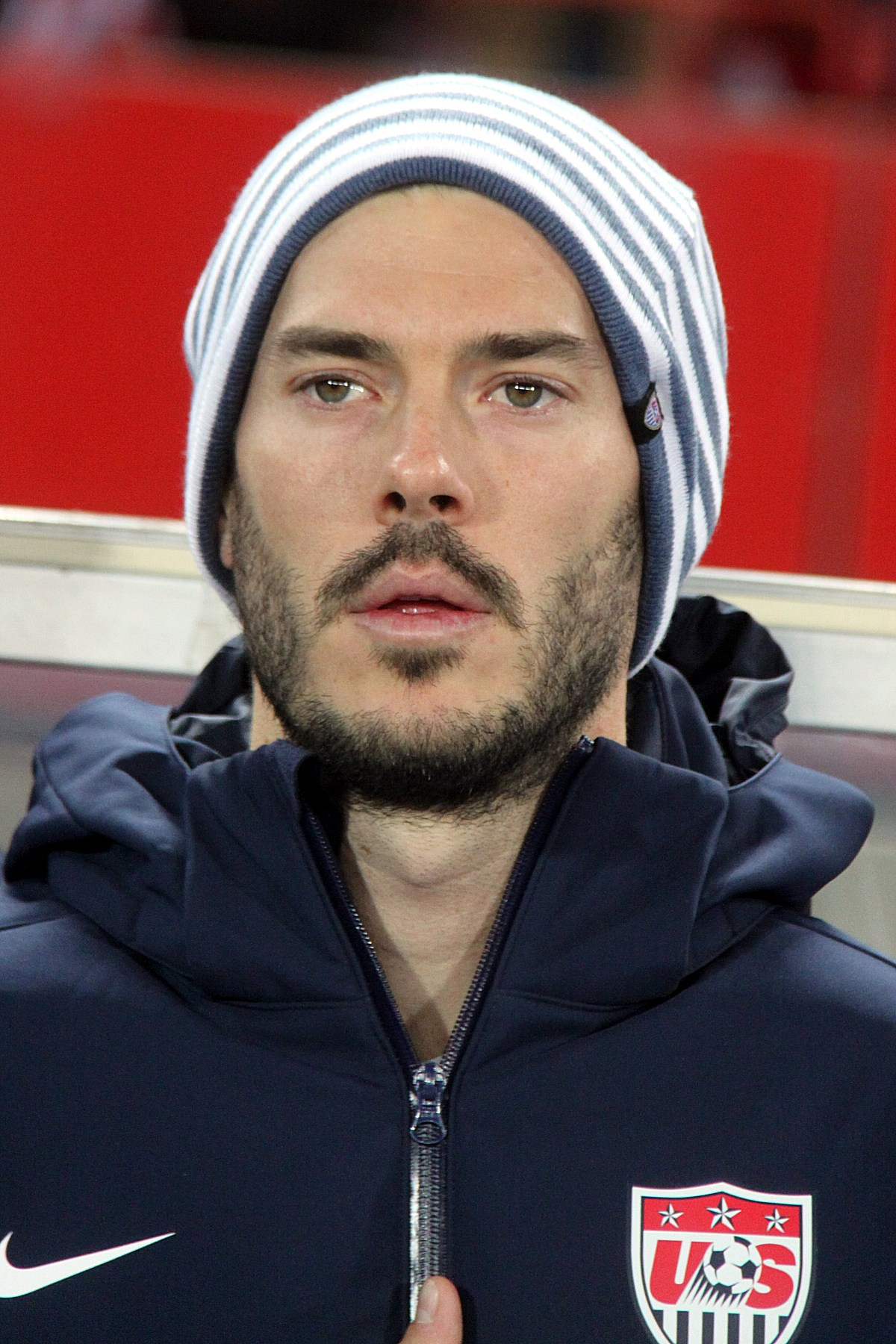
Evans with the United States seen before a friendly against Austria.

Evans was a member of the U-20 national team that competed at the 2005 FIFA U-20 World Cup under Sigi Schmid, being used as a substitute in a 0–0 draw with Germany and starting at right back in a 1–0 win over Egypt in Group D. He was an unused substitute during the 3–1 Round of 16 loss to Italy weeks later. Evans was called up to the senior team for the 2009 Gold Cup, which had an opening group match at Qwest Field in Seattle. He entered the 4–0 win over Grenada on July 4 in the 63rd minute and received an immediate yellow card for coming on too early, and Evans did not play in a 2–0 win over Honduras, but played in a 2–2 draw with Haiti. Evans played in the knockout stages, coming on in the 110th minute during a 2–1 quarterfinal win over Panama on July 18. He was an unused substitute in the 2–0 semifinal win over Honduras on July 23 and the 5–0 loss to Mexico in the Gold Cup final on July 26.

Evans appeared in a 2–1 friendly win against El Salvador in February 2010, and did not play in 2011. He was a second-half substitute in 1–0 friendly wins over Venezuela in his hometown of Phoenix, Arizona and Panama in January 2012. Evans was named to the January 2013 training camp for the national team and played in a 0–0 friendly against Canada at BBVA Compass Stadium. He was later called to play during 2014 FIFA World Cup qualification, being an unused substitute in a loss to Honduras. United States coach Jürgen Klinsmann added Evans to his camp roster for May and June, where he used the Sounders midfielder as a late-game substitute in a loss to Belgium and let Evans start against Germany during the centennial celebrations for the United States Soccer Federation, a 4–3 win in Washington, D.C. Klinsmann started Evans during a friendly against Germany and a qualification match against Jamaica as a right back instead of his usual midfield positions, which proved beneficial as he scored his first international goal in the latter match, a 2–1 win for the United States in stoppage time.

== Broadcasting career ==
After his retirement, Evans joined the Sounders in 2020 as a club ambassador and also worked in various broadcast roles. He co-hosted a podcast with Steve Zakuani, which included interviews of MLS and Sounders players. In 2023, Evans was named the color commentator for KJR radio broadcasts of Sounders matches. He replaced Kasey Keller, who had been in the role for television and most radio broadcasts.

== Career statistics ==
=== Club ===
Club	Season	League			Playoffs (Note: Appearances in the PDL Playoffs and MLS Cup Playoffs)		Cup		Continental		Total	
Club	Season	Division	Apps	Goals	Apps	Goals	Apps	Goals	Apps	Goals	Apps	Goals
Orange County Blue Star	2004	PDL	6	4	0	0	–		–		6	4
Orange County Blue Star	2005	PDL	1	1	0	0	0	0	–		1	1
Orange County Blue Star	2006	PDL	8	2	1	1	–		–		9	3
Orange County Blue Star	Total		15	7	1	1	0	0	0	0	16	8
Columbus Crew	2007	MLS	4	0	–		0	0	–		4	0
Columbus Crew	2008	MLS	26	5	4	1	0	0	–		30	6
Columbus Crew	Total		30	5	4	1	0	0	0	0	34	6
Seattle Sounders FC	2009	MLS	27	3	2	0	1	0	–		30	3
Seattle Sounders FC	2010	MLS	12	1	0	0	0	0	0	0	12	1
Seattle Sounders FC	2011	MLS	20	5	2	0	2	0	2	1	26	6
Seattle Sounders FC	2012	MLS	29	4	4	0	3	1	5	2	41	7
Seattle Sounders FC	2013	MLS	24	4	3	1	0	0	3	0	30	5
Seattle Sounders FC	2014	MLS	26	0	4	1	5	1	–		35	2
Seattle Sounders FC	2015	MLS	28	1	1	0	1	0	3	1	33	2
Seattle Sounders FC	2016	MLS	23	1	5	0	1	0	2	0	31	1
Seattle Sounders FC	2017	MLS	11	1	0	0	0	0	–		11	1
Seattle Sounders FC	Total		200	20	21	2	13	2	15	4	249	28
Sporting Kansas City	2018	MLS	0	0	0	0	0	0	–		0	0
Swope Park Rangers (loan)	2018	USL	4	0	0	0	–		–		4	0
Career total			249	32	26	4	13	2	15	4	303	42

=== International ===
United States
Year	Apps	Goals
2009	3	0
2010	1	0
2011	0	0
2012	2	0
2013	10	1
2014	1	0
2015	8	0
2016	1	0
2017	1	0
Total	27	1

=== International goals ===
Scores and results list United States' goal tally first.

#	Date	Venue	Opponent	Score	Result	Competition	Reference
1.	June 7, 2013	Independence Park, Kingston, Jamaica	Jamaica	2–1	2–1	2014 FIFA World Cup qualification	

== Honors ==
Columbus Crew

- MLS Cup: 2008
- MLS Supporters' Shield: 2008

Seattle Sounders FC

- MLS Cup: 2016
- MLS Supporters' Shield: 2014
- U.S. Open Cup: 2009, 2010, 2011, 2014
