= United States at the CONCACAF Gold Cup =

Soccer tournament participation

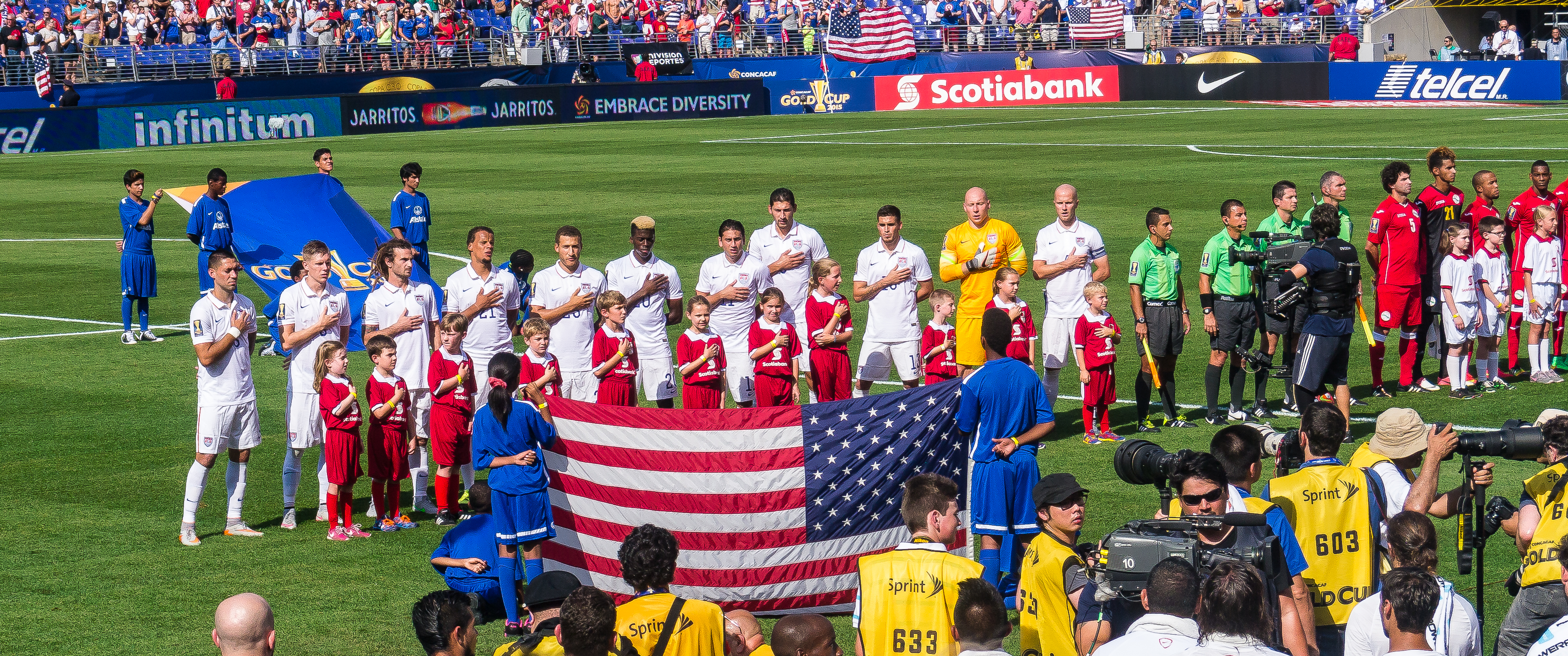
The United States line-up during the national anthem before their 2015 quarter-final against Cuba. The United States ended up winning 6–0, their joint-highest Gold Cup victory of all time.

The United States national team has participated in all eighteen editions of the CONCACAF Gold Cup since its foundation in 1991 to replace the CONCACAF Championship. The United States is also the second-most successful team in the tournament, having won seven titles since the beginning of the Gold Cup era, behind only Mexico by three titles. Before the Gold Cup however, the United States only qualified for two of the previous ten CONCACAF Championships (1985 and 1989).

Since its inception in 1991, the CONCACAF Gold Cup is continually hosted or co-hosted by the United States (due to the United States being the only country that can host a profitable tournament), therefore the United States have frequently participated in the tournament and are considered to be one of the two major teams alongside Mexico. They have reached the final thirteen times, losing six out of eight times when facing Mexico, but winning the other five finals against various opponents.

== Overall record ==
CONCACAF Championship & Gold Cup record
| Year | Result | Position | Pld | W | D | L | GF | GA | Squad |
|---|---|---|---|---|---|---|---|---|---|
| (El Salvador) 1963 | Did not enter | | | | | | | | |
| (Guatemala) 1965 | Did not enter | | | | | | | | |
| (Honduras) 1967 | Did not enter | | | | | | | | |
| (Costa Rica) 1969 | Did not qualify | | | | | | | | |
| (Trinidad and Tobago) 1971 | Did not enter | | | | | | | | |
| (Haiti) 1973 | Did not qualify | | | | | | | | |
| (Mexico) 1977 | Did not qualify | | | | | | | | |
| (Honduras) 1981 | Did not qualify | | | | | | | | |
| 1985 | Group stage | 6th | 4 | 2 | 1 | 1 | 4 | 3 | Squad |
| 1989 | Runners-up | 2nd | 8 | 4 | 3 | 1 | 6 | 3 | Squad |
| (United States) 1991 | Champions | 1st | 5 | 4 | 1 | 0 | 10 | 3 | Squad |
| (Mexico) (United States) 1993 | Runners-up | 2nd | 5 | 4 | 0 | 1 | 5 | 5 | Squad |
| (United States) 1996 | Third place | 3rd | 4 | 3 | 0 | 1 | 8 | 3 | Squad |
| (United States) 1998 | Runners-up | 2nd | 4 | 3 | 0 | 1 | 6 | 2 | Squad |
| (United States) 2000 | Quarter-finals | 5th | 3 | 2 | 1 | 0 | 6 | 2 | Squad |
| (United States) 2002 | Champions | 1st | 5 | 4 | 1 | 0 | 9 | 1 | Squad |
| (Mexico) (United States) 2003 | Third place | 3rd | 5 | 4 | 0 | 1 | 13 | 4 | Squad |
| (United States) 2005 | Champions | 1st | 6 | 4 | 2 | 0 | 11 | 3 | Squad |
| (United States) 2007 | Champions | 1st | 6 | 6 | 0 | 0 | 13 | 3 | Squad |
| (United States) 2009 | Runners-up | 2nd | 6 | 4 | 1 | 1 | 12 | 8 | Squad |
| (United States) 2011 | Runners-up | 2nd | 6 | 4 | 0 | 2 | 9 | 6 | Squad |
| (United States) 2013 | Champions | 1st | 6 | 6 | 0 | 0 | 20 | 4 | Squad |
| (Canada) (United States) 2015 | Fourth place | 4th | 6 | 3 | 2 | 1 | 12 | 5 | Squad |
| (United States) 2017 | Champions | 1st | 6 | 5 | 1 | 0 | 13 | 4 | Squad |
| (Costa Rica) (Jamaica) (United States) 2019 | Runners-up | 2nd | 6 | 5 | 0 | 1 | 15 | 2 | Squad |
| (United States) 2021 | Champions | 1st | 6 | 6 | 0 | 0 | 11 | 1 | Squad |
| (Canada) (United States) 2023 | Semi-finals | 4th | 5 | 2 | 3 | 0 | 16 | 4 | Squad |
| (Canada) (United States) 2025 | Runners-up | 2nd | 6 | 4 | 1 | 1 | 13 | 6 | Squad |
| Total | 20/28 | 7 Titles | 108 | 79 | 17 | 12 | 212 | 72 | |

== Winning finals ==
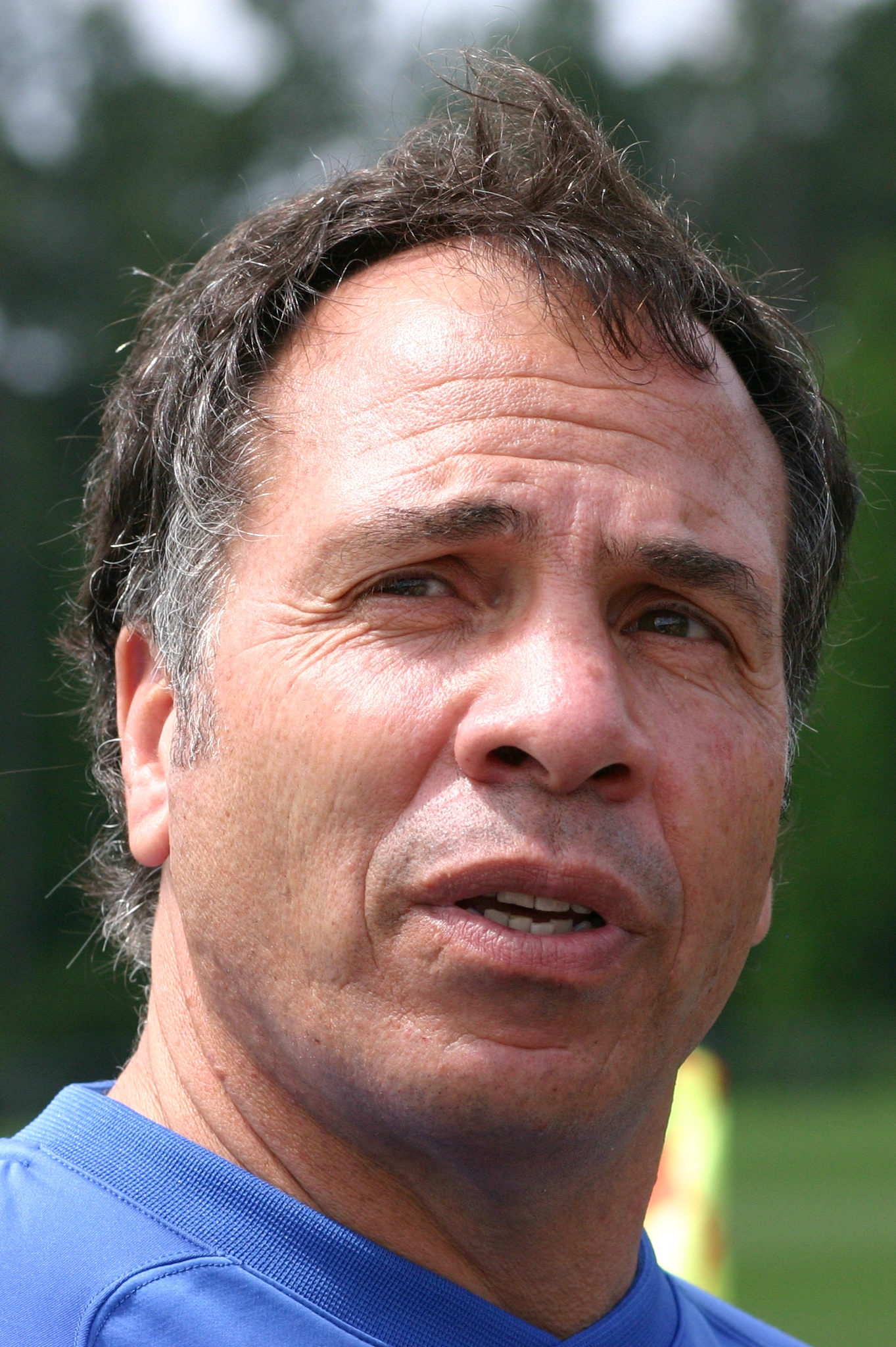
Bruce Arena led the U.S. team to three continental championships.

With three titles, Bruce Arena is the most successful coach in tournament history. Bora Milutinovic went on to win the 1996 tournament as head coach of Mexico.

| Year | Opponent | Result | Coach | Goalscorer(s) | Final location |
|---|---|---|---|---|---|
| 1991 | Honduras | 0–0 (4–3 p) | (Socialist Federal Republic of Yugoslavia) Bora Milutinovic | — | (United States) Los Angeles |
| 2002 | Costa Rica | 2–0 | (United States) Bruce Arena | J. Wolff, J. Agoos | (United States) Pasadena |
| 2005 | Panama | 0–0 (3–1 p) | (United States) Bruce Arena | — | (United States) East Rutherford |
| 2007 | Mexico | 2–1 | (United States) Bob Bradley | L. Donovan, B. Feilhaber | (United States) Chicago |
| 2013 | Panama | 1–0 | (Germany) Jürgen Klinsmann | B. Shea | (United States) Chicago |
| 2017 | Jamaica | 2–1 | (United States) Bruce Arena | J. Altidore, J. Morris | (United States) Santa Clara |
| 2021 | Mexico | 1–0 (a.e.t.) | (United States) Gregg Berhalter | M. Robinson | (United States) Paradise |

== Record by opponent ==
CONCACAF Championship/Gold Cup matches (by team)
| Opponent | W | D | L | Pld | GF | GA |
|---|---|---|---|---|---|---|
| Belize | 1 | 0 | 0 | 1 | 6 | 1 |
| Brazil | 1 | 0 | 2 | 3 | 2 | 3 |
| Canada | 4 | 2 | 0 | 6 | 9 | 3 |
| Colombia | 0 | 1 | 0 | 1 | 2 | 2 |
| Costa Rica | 8 | 3 | 2 | 13 | 18 | 10 |
| Cuba | 6 | 0 | 0 | 6 | 23 | 2 |
| Curaçao | 1 | 0 | 0 | 1 | 1 | 0 |
| El Salvador | 7 | 1 | 0 | 8 | 20 | 1 |
| Grenada | 1 | 0 | 0 | 1 | 4 | 0 |
| Guadeloupe | 1 | 0 | 0 | 1 | 1 | 0 |
| Guatemala | 5 | 1 | 0 | 6 | 11 | 2 |
| Guyana | 1 | 0 | 0 | 1 | 4 | 0 |
| Haiti | 4 | 1 | 0 | 5 | 9 | 3 |
| Honduras | 6 | 1 | 0 | 7 | 12 | 3 |
| Jamaica | 6 | 1 | 1 | 8 | 14 | 6 |
| Martinique | 3 | 0 | 0 | 3 | 11 | 3 |
| Mexico | 3 | 0 | 6 | 9 | 8 | 18 |
| Nicaragua | 1 | 0 | 0 | 1 | 3 | 0 |
| Panama | 6 | 5 | 1 | 12 | 14 | 9 |
| Peru | 1 | 0 | 0 | 1 | 1 | 0 |
| Qatar | 1 | 0 | 0 | 1 | 1 | 0 |
| Saint Kitts and Nevis | 1 | 0 | 0 | 1 | 6 | 0 |
| Saudi Arabia | 1 | 0 | 0 | 1 | 1 | 0 |
| South Korea | 1 | 0 | 0 | 1 | 2 | 1 |
| Trinidad and Tobago | 9 | 1 | 0 | 10 | 29 | 5 |

== 1985 CONCACAF Championship ==
=== Group 3 ===
| Rank | Team | Pts | Pld | W | D | L | GF | GA | GD |
|---|---|---|---|---|---|---|---|---|---|
| 1 | Costa Rica | 6 | 4 | 2 | 2 | 0 | 6 | 2 | +4 |
| 2 | United States | 5 | 4 | 2 | 1 | 1 | 4 | 3 | +1 |
| 3 | Trinidad and Tobago | 1 | 4 | 0 | 1 | 3 | 2 | 7 | −5 |

15 May 1985

| Trinidad and Tobago | 1–2 | United States |
|---|---|---|
| Fonrose 19' | | Borja 24'; Peterson 89' |

St. Louis, United States
Referee: Robert Allen (Canada)

19 May 1985

| United States | 1–0 | Trinidad and Tobago |
|---|---|---|
| Caligiuri 15' |

Murdock Stadium, Torrance, United States
Referee: Jorge Leanza Sansone (Mexico)

26 May 1985

| Costa Rica | 1–1 | United States |
|---|---|---|
| Ramírez 42' | | Kerr 44' |

Alajuela, Costa Rica
Referee: Joaquin Urrea Reyes (Mexico)

31 May 1985

| United States | 0–1 | Costa Rica |
|---|---|---|
| | | Coronado 35' |

Murdock Stadium, Torrance, United States
Referee: John Meachin (Canada)

== 1989 CONCACAF Championship ==
=== Final round ===
| | Pld | W | D | L | GF | GA | GD | Pts |
|---|---|---|---|---|---|---|---|---|
| Costa Rica | 8 | 5 | 1 | 2 | 10 | 6 | +4 | 11 |
| United States | 8 | 4 | 3 | 1 | 6 | 3 | +3 | 11 |
| Trinidad and Tobago | 8 | 3 | 3 | 2 | 7 | 5 | +2 | 9 |
| Guatemala | 6 | 1 | 1 | 4 | 4 | 7 | −3 | 3 |
| El Salvador | 6 | 0 | 2 | 4 | 2 | 8 | −6 | 2 |

| | (Costa Rica) | (El Salvador) | (Guatemala) | (Trinidad and Tobago) | (United States) |
|---|---|---|---|---|---|
| Costa Rica | – | 1–0 | 2–1 | 1–0 | 1–0 |
| El Salvador | 2–4 | – | X–X | 0–0 | 0–1 |
| Guatemala | 1–0 | X–X | – | 0–1 | 0–0 |
| Trinidad and Tobago | 1–1 | 2–0 | 2–1 | – | 0–1 |
| United States | 1–0 | 0–0 | 2–1 | 1–1 | – |

16 April 1989

| Costa Rica | 1–0 | United States |
|---|---|---|
| Rhoden 14' |

Estadio Nacional de Costa Rica, San José
Attendance: 26,271
Referee: José Antonio Garza (Mexico)

30 April 1989

| United States | 1–0 | Costa Rica |
|---|---|---|
| Ramos 72' |

Saint Louis Soccer Park, Fenton
Attendance: 8,500
Referee: Rodolfo Méndez (Honduras)

13 May 1989

| United States | 1–1 | Trinidad and Tobago |
|---|---|---|
| Trittschuh 48' | | Charles 88' |

Murdock Stadium, Torrance
Attendance: 10,000
Referee: Luigi Agnolin (Italy)

17 June 1989

| United States | 2–1 | Guatemala |
|---|---|---|
| Murray 3'; Eichmann 67' | | Chacón 22' |

Veterans Stadium, New Britain
Attendance: 10,500
Referee: Gordon Arrowsmith (Canada)

17 September 1989

| El Salvador | 0–1 | United States |
|---|---|---|
| | | Pérez 61' |

Estadio Nacional, Tegucigalpa
Attendance: 3,700
Referee: Edgardo Codesal (Mexico)

8 October 1989

| Guatemala | 0–0 | United States |

Estadio Mateo Flores, Guatemala City
Attendance: 8,000
Referee: Elías Jácome (Ecuador)

5 November 1989

| United States | 0–0 | El Salvador |

Saint Louis Soccer Park, Fenton
Attendance: 8,500
Referee: John Meachin (Canada)

19 November 1989

| Trinidad and Tobago | 0–1 | United States |
|---|---|---|
| | | Caligiuri 30' |

National Stadium, Port of Spain
Attendance: 35,000
Referee: Juan Carlos Loustau (Argentina)

The Championship also served as 1990 World Cup qualification, which helped the U.S. to qualify for the World Cup for the first time since 1950.

== 1991 CONCACAF Gold Cup ==
=== Group B ===
| Team | Pld | W | D | L | GF | GA | GD | Pts |
|---|---|---|---|---|---|---|---|---|
| United States | 3 | 3 | 0 | 0 | 8 | 3 | +5 | 6 |
| Costa Rica | 3 | 1 | 0 | 2 | 5 | 5 | 0 | 2 |
| Trinidad and Tobago | 3 | 1 | 0 | 2 | 3 | 4 | −1 | 2 |
| Guatemala | 3 | 1 | 0 | 2 | 1 | 5 | −4 | 2 |

June 29, 1991

| United States | 2–1 | Trinidad and Tobago |
|---|---|---|
| Murray 85'; Balboa 87' | Report | Lewis 67' |

Rose Bowl, Pasadena
Attendance: 18,435
Referee: José Carlos Ortíz (El Salvador)

July 1, 1991

| Guatemala | 0–3 | United States |
|---|---|---|
| | Report | Murray 11'; Quinn 46'; Wynalda 52' |

Rose Bowl, Pasadena
Attendance: 6,344
Referee: Arlington Success (Antigua and Barbuda)

July 3, 1991

| United States | 3–2 | Costa Rica |
|---|---|---|
| Vermes 6'; Pérez 49' (pen.); Marchena 59' (o.g.) | Report | Arguedas 30'; Jara 33' |

Memorial Coliseum, Los Angeles
Attendance: 36,703
Referee: Arturo Brizio Carter (Mexico)

=== Semi-finals ===
July 5, 1991

| United States | 2–0 | Mexico |
|---|---|---|
| Doyle 48'; Vermes 64' | Report |

Memorial Coliseum, Los Angeles
Attendance: 41,103
Referee: José Carlos Ortiz (El Salvador)

=== Final ===
July 7, 1991

| United States | 0–0 (a.e.t.) | Honduras |
|---|---|---|
| | Report |
Penalties
| Balboa (penalty scored); Vermes (penalty missed); Pérez (penalty missed); Caligiuri (penalty scored); Eck (penalty missed); Quinn (penalty missed); Kinnear (penalty scored); Clavijo (penalty scored) | 4–3 | (penalty scored) Castro; (penalty missed) Anariba; (penalty missed) Yearwood; (penalty scored) Flores; (penalty missed) Zapata; (penalty missed) Cálix; (penalty scored) Vallejo; (penalty missed) Espinoza |

Memorial Coliseum, Los Angeles
Attendance: 41,103
Referee: Arturo Brizio Carter (Mexico)

== 1993 CONCACAF Gold Cup ==
=== Group A ===
| Pos | Team | Pld | W | D | L | GF | GA | GD | Pts | Qualification |
|---|---|---|---|---|---|---|---|---|---|---|
| 1 | United States | 3 | 3 | 0 | 0 | 4 | 1 | +3 | 9 | Qualification to Semi-finals |
| 2 | Jamaica | 3 | 1 | 1 | 1 | 4 | 3 | +1 | 4 | Qualification to Semi-finals |
| 3 | Honduras | 3 | 1 | 0 | 2 | 6 | 5 | +1 | 3 | |
| 4 | Panama | 3 | 0 | 1 | 2 | 3 | 8 | −5 | 1 | |

July 10

| United States | 1–0 | Jamaica |
|---|---|---|
| Wynalda 67' | Report |

Cotton Bowl, Dallas
Attendance: 11,642
Referee: Ulloa (CRC)

July 14

| United States | 2–1 | Panama |
|---|---|---|
| Wynalda 69'; Dooley 74' | Report | Piggott 33' |

Cotton Bowl, Dallas
Attendance: 13,771
Referee: Parisius (SUR)

July 17

| United States | 1–0 | Honduras |
|---|---|---|
| Lalas 29' | Report |

Cotton Bowl, Dallas
Attendance: 18,527
Referee: Sawtell (CAN)

=== Semi-finals ===
July 22, 1993

| United States | 1–0 (asdet) | Costa Rica |
|---|---|---|
| Kooiman 103' | Report |

Cotton Bowl, Dallas
Attendance: 14,826
Referee: Ramdhan (TRI)

=== Final ===
July 25, 1993

| Mexico | 4–0 | United States |
|---|---|---|
| Ambriz 11'; Armstrong 31' (o.g.); Zague 69'; Cantú 79' | Report |

Estadio Azteca, Mexico City
Attendance: 130,800
Referee: Sawtell (CAN)

== 1996 CONCACAF Gold Cup ==
=== Group C ===
| Team | Pld | W | D | L | GF | GA | GD | Pts |
|---|---|---|---|---|---|---|---|---|
| United States | 2 | 2 | 0 | 0 | 5 | 2 | +3 | 6 |
| El Salvador | 2 | 1 | 0 | 1 | 3 | 4 | −1 | 3 |
| Trinidad and Tobago | 2 | 0 | 0 | 2 | 4 | 6 | −2 | 0 |

January 13, 1996

| United States | 3–2 | Trinidad and Tobago |
|---|---|---|
| Wynalda 15', 34'; Moore 53' | Report | Dwarika 6', 43' |

Anaheim Stadium, Anaheim
Attendance: 12,425
Referee: Argelio Sabillon (Honduras)

January 16, 1996

| United States | 2–0 | El Salvador |
|---|---|---|
| Wynalda 63'; Balboa 75' | Report |

Anaheim Stadium, Anaheim
Attendance: 52,345
Referee: Ramesh Ramdhan (Trinidad and Tobago)

=== Semi-finals ===
January 18, 1996

| United States | 0–1 | Brazil |
|---|---|---|
| | Report | Balboa 79' (o.g.) |

Los Angeles Memorial Coliseum
Attendance: 20,708
Referee: Armando Archundia (Mexico)

=== Third place match ===
January 21, 1996

| United States | 3–0 | Guatemala |
|---|---|---|
| Wynalda 34'; Agoos 37'; Kirovski 87' | Report |

Los Angeles Memorial Coliseum, Los Angeles
Attendance: 88,125
Referee: René Parra (Canada)

== 1998 CONCACAF Gold Cup ==
=== Group C ===
| Team | Pld | W | D | L | GF | GA | GD | Pts |
|---|---|---|---|---|---|---|---|---|
| United States | 2 | 2 | 0 | 0 | 5 | 1 | +4 | 6 |
| Costa Rica | 2 | 1 | 0 | 1 | 8 | 4 | +4 | 3 |
| Cuba | 2 | 0 | 0 | 2 | 2 | 10 | −8 | 0 |

February 1, 1998

| United States | 3–0 | Cuba |
|---|---|---|
| Wegerle 55'; Wynalda 58'; Moore 76' (pen.) | Report |

Oakland Coliseum, Oakland
Attendance: 11,234
Referee: Mourad Daami (Tunisia)

February 7, 1998

| United States | 2–1 | Costa Rica |
|---|---|---|
| Pope 7'; Preki 78' | Report | Oviedo 56' |

Oakland Coliseum, Oakland
Attendance: 36,240
Referee: Mohammed Nazri (Malaysia)

=== Semi-finals ===
February 10, 1998

| United States | 1–0 | Brazil |
|---|---|---|
| Preki 65' | Report |

Los Angeles Memorial Coliseum, Los Angeles
Attendance: 12,298
Referee: Ali Bujsaim (United Arab Emirates)

=== Final ===
February 15, 1998

| United States | 0–1 | Mexico |
|---|---|---|
| | Report | Hernández 43' |

Los Angeles Memorial Coliseum, Los Angeles
Attendance: 91,255
Referee: Ramesh Ramdhan (Trinidad and Tobago)

== 2000 CONCACAF Gold Cup ==
=== Group B ===
| Team | Pld | W | D | L | GF | GA | GD | Pts |
|---|---|---|---|---|---|---|---|---|
| United States | 2 | 2 | 0 | 0 | 4 | 0 | +4 | 6 |
| Peru | 2 | 0 | 1 | 1 | 1 | 2 | −1 | 1 |
| Haiti | 2 | 0 | 1 | 1 | 1 | 4 | −3 | 1 |

February 12, 2000
19:00 ET

| United States | 3–0 | Haiti |
|---|---|---|
| Kirovski 18'; Wynalda 55' (pen.); Jones 90' | Report |

Orange Bowl, Miami
Attendance: 49,591
Referee: Olger Mejías (Costa Rica)

February 16, 2000
21:00 ET

| Peru | 0–1 | United States |
|---|---|---|
| | Report | Jones 59' |

Orange Bowl, Miami
Attendance: 36,004
Referee: Felipe Ramos (Mexico)

=== Quarter-finals ===
February 19, 2000
15:00 ET

| United States | 2–2 (a.e.t.) | Colombia |
|---|---|---|
| McBride 20'; Armas 51' | Report | Asprilla 24'; Bedoya 81' |
Penalties
| Wynalda (penalty missed); Reyna (penalty missed); Lewis (penalty scored); Armas (penalty missed); Olsen (penalty missed) | 1–2 | (penalty missed) Pérez; (penalty scored) Martínez; (penalty missed) Candelo; (penalty scored) Mosquera |

Orange Bowl, Miami
Attendance: 32,972
Referee: Carlos Batres (Guatemala)

== 2002 CONCACAF Gold Cup ==
=== Group B ===
| Team | Pld | W | D | L | GF | GA | GD | Pts |
|---|---|---|---|---|---|---|---|---|
| United States | 2 | 2 | 0 | 0 | 3 | 1 | +2 | 6 |
| South Korea | 2 | 0 | 1 | 1 | 1 | 2 | −1 | 1 |
| Cuba | 2 | 0 | 1 | 1 | 0 | 1 | −1 | 1 |

January 18, 2002

| United States | 2–1 | South Korea |
|---|---|---|
| Donovan 36'; Beasley 90' | Report | Song Chong-Gug 38' |

Rose Bowl, Pasadena
Attendance: 42,117
Referee: Samuel Richard (Dominican Republic)

January 20, 2002

| Cuba | 0–1 | United States |
|---|---|---|
| | Report | McBride 22' |

Rose Bowl, Pasadena
Attendance: 31,244
Referee: José Pineda (Honduras)

=== Quarter-finals ===
January 27, 2002

| United States | 4–0 | El Salvador |
|---|---|---|
| McBride 9', 11', 21'; Razov 72' | Report |

Rose Bowl, Pasadena
Attendance: 31,628
Referee: Richard (DOM)

=== Semi-finals ===
January 30, 2002

| Canada | 0–0 (a.e.t.) | United States |
|---|---|---|
| | Report |
Penalties
| McKenna (penalty missed); Stalteri (penalty scored); De Rosario (penalty scored); Nsaliwa (penalty missed) | 2–4 | Donovan (penalty scored); McBride (penalty scored); Agoos (penalty scored); Mathis (penalty scored) |

Rose Bowl, Pasadena
Attendance: 7,241
Referee: Prendergast (JAM)

=== Final ===
February 2, 2002

| United States | 2–0 | Costa Rica |
|---|---|---|
| Wolff 37'; Agoos 63' | Report |

Rose Bowl, Pasadena
Attendance: 14,432
Referee: Batres (GUA)

== 2003 CONCACAF Gold Cup ==
=== Group C ===
| Team | Pld | W | D | L | GF | GA | GD | Pts |
|---|---|---|---|---|---|---|---|---|
| United States | 2 | 2 | 0 | 0 | 4 | 0 | +4 | 6 |
| El Salvador | 2 | 1 | 0 | 1 | 1 | 2 | −1 | 3 |
| Martinique | 2 | 0 | 0 | 2 | 0 | 3 | −3 | 0 |

July 11, 2003

| United States | 2–0 | El Salvador |
|---|---|---|
| Lewis 28'; McBride 76' | Report |

Gillette Stadium, Foxboro
Attendance: 33,652
Referee: Felipe Ramos (Mexico)

July 13, 2003

| Martinique | 0–2 | United States |
|---|---|---|
| | Report | McBride 39', 43' |

Gillette Stadium, Foxboro
Attendance: 8,780
Referee: Roberto Moreno (Panama)

=== Quarter-finals ===
July 19, 2003

| United States | 5–0 | Cuba |
|---|---|---|
| Donovan 22', 25', 55', 76'; Ralston 42' | Report |

Gillette Stadium, Foxboro
Attendance: 15,627
Referee: Peter Prendergast (Jamaica)

=== Semi-finals ===
July 23, 2003

| United States | 1–2 (ASDET) | Brazil |
|---|---|---|
| Bocanegra 62' | Report | Kaká 89'; Diego 100' (pen.) |

Orange Bowl, Miami
Attendance: 35,211
Referee: Carlos Alberto Batres (Guatemala)

=== Third place match ===
July 26, 2003

| United States | 3–2 | Costa Rica |
|---|---|---|
| Bocanegra 29'; Stewart 56'; Convey 67' | Report | Fonseca 24', 39' |

Orange Bowl, Miami
Attendance: 5,093
Referee: Richard Piper (Trinidad and Tobago)

== 2005 CONCACAF Gold Cup ==
=== Group B ===
| Team | Pld | W | D | L | GF | GA | GD | Pts |
|---|---|---|---|---|---|---|---|---|
| United States | 3 | 2 | 1 | 0 | 6 | 1 | +5 | 7 |
| Costa Rica | 3 | 2 | 1 | 0 | 4 | 1 | +3 | 7 |
| Canada | 3 | 1 | 0 | 2 | 2 | 4 | −2 | 3 |
| Cuba | 3 | 0 | 0 | 3 | 3 | 9 | −6 | 0 |

July 7, 2005

| Cuba | 1–4 | United States |
|---|---|---|
| Moré 18' | Report | Dempsey 44'; Donovan 87', 90+2'; Beasley 89' |

Qwest Field, Seattle
Attendance: 15,831
Referee: José Pineda (Honduras)

July 9, 2005

| United States | 2–0 | Canada |
|---|---|---|
| Hutchinson 48' (o.g.); Donovan 90' | (Report) |

Qwest Field, Seattle
Attendance: 15,109
Referee: Neal Brizan (Trinidad and Tobago)

July 11, 2005

| United States | 0–0 | Costa Rica |
|---|---|---|
| | Report |

Gillette Stadium, Foxboro
Attendance: 15,211
Referee: Benito Archundia (Mexico)

=== Quarter-finals ===
July 16, 2005
16:00

| United States | 3–1 | Jamaica |
|---|---|---|
| Wolff 6'; Beasley 42' 83' | Report | Fuller 88' |

Gillette Stadium, Foxboro
Attendance: 22,108
Referee: Carlos Alberto Batres (GUA)

=== Semi-finals ===
July 21, 2005
18:00

| Honduras | 1–2 | United States |
|---|---|---|
| Guerrero 30' | Report | O'Brien 86'; Onyewu 90+2' |

Giants Stadium, East Rutherford
Attendance: 41,721
Referee: Peter Prendergast (JAM)

=== Final ===
July 24, 2005
15:00

| United States | 0–0 (a.e.t.) | Panama |
|---|---|---|
| | Report |
Penalties
| Quaranta (penalty scored); Armas (penalty missed); Donovan (penalty scored); Davis (penalty scored) | 3–1 | (penalty missed) Tejada; (penalty missed) Dely Valdés; (penalty scored) Baloy; (penalty missed) Blanco |

Giants Stadium, East Rutherford
Attendance: 31,018
Referee: Carlos Alberto Batres (GUA)

== 2007 CONCACAF Gold Cup ==
=== Group B ===
| Team | Pld | W | D | L | GF | GA | GD | Pts |
|---|---|---|---|---|---|---|---|---|
| United States | 3 | 3 | 0 | 0 | 7 | 0 | +7 | 9 |
| Guatemala | 3 | 1 | 1 | 1 | 2 | 2 | 0 | 4 |
| El Salvador | 3 | 1 | 0 | 2 | 2 | 6 | −4 | 3 |
| Trinidad and Tobago | 3 | 0 | 1 | 2 | 2 | 5 | −3 | 1 |

7 June 2007
18:00 UTC-7

| United States | 1–0 | Guatemala |
|---|---|---|
| Dempsey 26' | Report |

The Home Depot Center, Carson
Attendance: 21,334
Referee: José Pineda (Honduras)

9 June 2007
14:00 UTC-7

| Trinidad and Tobago | 0–2 | United States |
|---|---|---|
| | Report | Ching 29'; Johnson 54' |

The Home Depot Center, Carson
Attendance: 27,000
Referee: Roberto Moreno (Panama)

12 June 2007
19:00 UTC-4

| United States | 4–0 | El Salvador |
|---|---|---|
| Beasley 34', 90'; Donovan 45+1' (pen.); Twellman 73' | Report |

Gillette Stadium, Foxborough
Attendance: 26,523
Referee: Benito Archundia (Mexico)

=== Quarter-finals ===
16 June 2007
16:00 UTC-4

| United States | 2–1 | Panama |
|---|---|---|
| Donovan 60' (pen.); Bocanegra 62' | Report | B. Pérez 85' |

Gillette Stadium, Foxborough
Attendance: 22,412
Referee: Neal Brizan (Trinidad and Tobago)

=== Semi-finals ===
21 June 2007
18:00 UTC-5

| Canada | 1–2 | United States |
|---|---|---|
| Hume 76' | Report | Hejduk 39'; Donovan 45' (pen.) |

Soldier Field, Chicago
Attendance: 50,760
Referee: Benito Archundia (Mexico)

=== Final ===
24 June 2007
14:00 UTC-5

| United States | 2–1 | Mexico |
|---|---|---|
| Donovan 62' (pen.); Feilhaber 73' | Report | Guardado 44' |

Soldier Field, Chicago
Attendance: 60,000
Referee: Carlos Batres (Guatemala)

== 2009 CONCACAF Gold Cup ==
=== Group B ===
| Team | Pld | W | D | L | GF | GA | GD | Pts |
|---|---|---|---|---|---|---|---|---|
| United States | 3 | 2 | 1 | 0 | 8 | 2 | +6 | 7 |
| Honduras | 3 | 2 | 0 | 1 | 5 | 2 | +3 | 6 |
| Haiti | 3 | 1 | 1 | 1 | 4 | 3 | +1 | 4 |
| Grenada | 3 | 0 | 0 | 3 | 0 | 10 | −10 | 0 |

4 July 2009
| Grenada | 0–4 | United States |
8 July 2009
| United States | 2–0 | Honduras |
11 July 2009
| United States | 2–2 | Haiti |

=== Quarter-finals ===
18 July 2009
20:00 UTC-4

| United States | 2–1 (a.e.t.) | Panama |
|---|---|---|
| Beckerman 49'; Cooper 106' (pen.) | Report | Pérez 45' |

Lincoln Financial Field, Philadelphia
Attendance: 32,000
Referee: Benito Archundia (Mexico)

=== Semi-finals ===
23 July 2009
18:00 UTC-5

| Honduras | 0–2 | United States |
|---|---|---|
| | Report | Goodson 45'; Cooper 90' |

Soldier Field, Chicago
Attendance: 55,173
Referee: Courtney Campbell (Jamaica)

=== Final ===
26 July 2009
15:00 UTC-4

| United States | 0–5 | Mexico |
|---|---|---|
| | Report | Torrado 56' (pen.); Dos Santos 62'; Vela 67'; Castro 79'; Franco 90' |

Giants Stadium, East Rutherford
Attendance: 79,156
Referee: Courtney Campbell (Jamaica)

== 2011 CONCACAF Gold Cup ==
=== Group C ===
Group C of the 2011 CONCACAF Gold Cup was one of three groups competing at the tournament. The group's first round of matches were played on June 7, with the final round played on June 14. All six group matches were played at venues in the United States, in Detroit, Tampa and Kansas City. The group consisted of host, and four time Gold Cup champions, United States, 2000 Gold Cup champion Canada, as well as Panama and Guadeloupe.

== Summary ==
The group opened on June 7 with Panama taking an early three-goal lead against Guadeloupe before Brice Jovial of Guadeloupe brought the match within a goal's reach. However, the Panamanians were able to withstand Guadeloupe's late pressure and win their opening fixture. Immediately after the match, group favorites Canada and the United States squared off. Analysts claimed that the Canadian squad was the strongest in their history, possibly the strongest since the mid-1980s squad that qualified for the 1986 FIFA World Cup. For the Americans, they had come off a humbling 4–0 defeat in a tune up match against defending World champions, Spain. In spite of the rough patch endured by the United States, they were still considered favorites to beat Canada. Thanks to an early, 15th-minute goal from Jozy Altidore, along with a complementary second half goal from Clint Dempsey gave the United States a 2–0 win over Canada and the lead in the group.

While Canada expectedly defeated Guadeloupe on June 11, Panama pulled off a stunning 2–1 upset over the United States, in which some cited as possibly the largest upset of the entire tournament. The match marked the first time in Gold Cup history that the United States lost on its home soil during Group Stage play. It was also the first time since the 1985 CONCACAF Championship, that the United States lost on home ground in a continental tournament. Clearance Goodson scored the lone goal for the United States in the 66th minute, after he conceded an own goal for the Panamanians in the 19th minute. Panama's Gabriel Gómez converted a penalty kick in the 33rd minute, which ended up being the winner.

The group wrapped up play on June 14 with Panama and Canada playing each other followed by Guadeloupe taking on the United States. The matches were a doubleheader held at Livestrong Sporting Park in Kansas City.

== Standings ==
Key to colors in group tables
| Teams that advanced to the quarterfinals: Group winners; Group runners-up; Best two third-placed teams among all groups |

| Pos | Team | Pld | W | D | L | GF | GA | GD | Pts | Qualification |
|---|---|---|---|---|---|---|---|---|---|---|
| 1 | Panama | 3 | 2 | 1 | 0 | 6 | 4 | +2 | 7 | Advance to knockout stage |
| 2 | United States | 3 | 2 | 0 | 1 | 4 | 2 | +2 | 6 | Advance to knockout stage |
| 3 | Canada | 3 | 1 | 1 | 1 | 2 | 3 | −1 | 4 | |
| 4 | Guadeloupe | 3 | 0 | 0 | 3 | 2 | 5 | −3 | 0 | |

Source: CONCACAF

== Matches ==
All times are U.S. Eastern Daylight Time (UTC−4) (local times in parentheses)

=== Panama vs Guadeloupe ===
June 7, 2011
18:00

| Panama | 3–2 | Guadeloupe |
|---|---|---|
| Pérez 29'; Tejada 31'; Gómez 57' (pen.) | Report | Jovial 65', 78' |

Ford Field, Detroit
Attendance: 28,209
Referee: Marlon Mejía (El Salvador)

| Panama | Guadeloupe |

| GK | 1 | Jaime Penedo |
| DF | 23 | Felipe Baloy (c) |
| DF | 17 | Luis Henríquez |
| DF | 14 | Eduardo Dasent |
| DF | 13 | Adolfo Machado | (substituted off) 82' |
| MF | 6 | Gabriel Gómez |
| MF | 10 | Nelson Barahona | (substituted off) 77' |
| MF | 21 | Amílcar Henríquez |
| MF | 11 | Armando Cooper |
| FW | 18 | Luis Tejada | (substituted off) 67' |
| FW | 7 | Blas Pérez |
Substitutions:
| FW | 16 | Luis Rentería | (substituted on) 67' |
| MF | 19 | Alberto Quintero | (substituted on) 77' |
| DF | 3 | Harold Cummings | (substituted on) 82' |
Manager:
Julio Dely Valdés

| GK | 1 | Franck Grandel | (yellow card) 73' |
| DF | 2 | Miguel Comminges |
| DF | 13 | Jean-Luc Lambourde |
| DF | 22 | Mickaël Tacalfred | (red card) 38' |
| DF | 5 | Eddy Viator |
| MF | 7 | Loïc Loval |
| MF | 6 | David Fleurival |
| MF | 19 | Stéphane Auvray (c) | (yellow card) 36' | (substituted off) 76' |
| MF | 17 | Cédric Collet | | (substituted off) 59' |
| MF | 14 | Grégory Gendrey | | (substituted off) 47' |
| FW | 21 | Richard Socrier | (yellow card) 89' |
Substitutions:
| FW | 18 | Brice Jovial | | (substituted on) 47' |
| MF | 12 | Thomas Gamiette | | (substituted on) 59' |
| MF | 10 | Therry Racon | | (substituted on) 76' |
Manager:
Roger Salnot

Assistant referees:
José Luis Camargo (Mexico)
Ainsley Rochard (Trinidad and Tobago)
Fourth official:
Marco Rodríguez (Mexico)

=== United States vs Canada ===
June 7, 2011
20:00

| United States | 2–0 | Canada |
|---|---|---|
| Altidore 15'; Dempsey 62' | Report |

Ford Field, Detroit
Attendance: 28,209
Referee: Walter López (Guatemala)

| United States | Canada |

| GK | 1 | Tim Howard |
| RB | 6 | Steve Cherundolo |
| CB | 21 | Clarence Goodson |
| CB | 15 | Tim Ream |
| LB | 3 | Carlos Bocanegra (c) |
| CM | 4 | Michael Bradley | (yellow card) 51' |
| CM | 13 | Jermaine Jones | | (substituted off) 79' |
| RW | 10 | Landon Donovan |
| LW | 8 | Clint Dempsey |
| CF | 9 | Juan Agudelo | | (substituted off) 64' |
| CF | 17 | Jozy Altidore | | (substituted off) 74' |
Substitutions:
| FW | 11 | Chris Wondolowski | | (substituted on) 64' |
| MF | 16 | Sacha Kljestan | | (substituted on) 74' |
| MF | 7 | Maurice Edu | | (substituted on) 79' |
Manager:
Bob Bradley

| GK | 1 | Lars Hirschfeld |
| RB | 2 | Nikolas Ledgerwood |
| CB | 4 | Kevin McKenna (c) |
| CB | 5 | André Hainault |
| LB | 19 | Marcel de Jong |
| DM | 13 | Atiba Hutchinson |
| CM | 8 | Will Johnson | (yellow card) 52' | (substituted off) 65' |
| CM | 7 | Terry Dunfield | | (substituted off) 82' |
| RW | 14 | Dwayne De Rosario | | (substituted off) 81' |
| LW | 11 | Josh Simpson |
| CF | 17 | Simeon Jackson |
Substitutions:
| FW | 10 | Ali Gerba | | (substituted on) 65' |
| FW | 9 | Rob Friend | | (substituted on) 81' |
| MF | 21 | Jonathan Beaulieu-Bourgault | | (substituted on) 82' |
Manager:
(Trinidad and Tobago) Stephen Hart

Assistant referees:
Daniel Williamson (Guatemala)
Oscar Velasquez (Guatemala)
Fourth official:
Trevor Taylor (Barbados)

=== Canada vs Guadeloupe ===
June 11, 2011
18:00

| Canada | 1–0 | Guadeloupe |
|---|---|---|
| De Rosario 51' (pen.) | Report |

Raymond James Stadium, Tampa
Attendance: 27,731
Referee: Trevor Taylor (Barbados)

| Canada | Guadeloupe |

| GK | 18 | Milan Borjan |
| RB | 2 | Nikolas Ledgerwood |
| CB | 4 | Kevin McKenna (c) |
| CB | 5 | André Hainault |
| LB | 3 | Mike Klukowski |
| CM | 8 | Will Johnson |
| CM | 6 | Julian de Guzman | | (substituted off) 81' |
| CM | 7 | Terry Dunfield | (yellow card) 86' |
| RW | 14 | Dwayne De Rosario | | (substituted off) 63' |
| LW | 11 | Josh Simpson |
| CF | 10 | Ali Gerba | | (substituted off) 64' |
Substitutions:
| FW | 17 | Simeon Jackson | | (substituted on) 63' |
| FW | 9 | Rob Friend | | (substituted on) 64' |
| MF | 12 | Pedro Pacheco | | (substituted on) 81' |
Manager:
(Trinidad and Tobago) Stephen Hart

| GK | 1 | Franck Grandel |
| DF | 2 | Miguel Comminges |
| DF | 13 | Jean-Luc Lambourde | (red card) 4' |
| DF | 3 | Stéphane Zubar | (yellow card) 49' |
| DF | 5 | Eddy Viator |
| MF | 6 | David Fleurival | | (substituted off) 58' |
| MF | 12 | Thomas Gamiette |
| MF | 19 | Stéphane Auvray (c) |
| MF | 10 | Therry Racon | | (substituted off) 65' |
| FW | 21 | Richard Socrier | | (substituted off) 73' |
| FW | 18 | Brice Jovial |
Substitutions:
| FW | 7 | Loïc Loval | | (substituted on) 58' |
| DF | 15 | Julien Ictoi | | (substituted on) 65' |
| FW | 11 | Livio Nabab | (yellow card) 90' | (substituted on) 73' |
Manager:
Roger Salnot

Assistant referees:
Adrian Goddard (Barbados)
Gerson Lopez (Guatemala)
Fourth official:
Marlon Mejía (El Salvador)

=== United States vs Panama ===
June 11, 2011
20:00

| United States | 1–2 | Panama |
|---|---|---|
| Goodson 68' | | Goodson 19' (o.g.); Gómez 36' (pen.) |

Raymond James Stadium, Tampa
Attendance: 27,731
Referee: Marco Rodríguez (Mexico)

| United States | Panama |

| GK | 1 | Tim Howard |
| DF | 3 | Carlos Bocanegra (c) | (yellow card) 90+3' |
| DF | 21 | Clarence Goodson | (yellow card) 56' | (substituted off) 78' |
| DF | 6 | Steve Cherundolo |
| DF | 15 | Tim Ream |
| MF | 8 | Clint Dempsey |
| MF | 13 | Jermaine Jones | (yellow card) 18' | (substituted off) 60' |
| MF | 4 | Michael Bradley |
| MF | 10 | Landon Donovan |
| FW | 17 | Jozy Altidore | (yellow card) 25' |
| FW | 9 | Juan Agudelo | | (substituted off) 61' |
Substitutions:
| MF | 16 | Sacha Kljestan | | (substituted on) 60' |
| MF | 22 | Alejandro Bedoya | (yellow card) 64' | (substituted on) 61' |
| FW | 11 | Chris Wondolowski | | (substituted on) 78' |
Manager:
Bob Bradley

| GK | 1 | Jaime Penedo | (yellow card) 90+2' |
| DF | 23 | Felipe Baloy (c) |
| DF | 17 | Luis Henríquez |
| DF | 5 | Román Torres |
| DF | 14 | Eduardo Dasent |
| MF | 6 | Gabriel Gómez |
| MF | 10 | Nelson Barahona | (yellow card) 25' | (substituted off) 70' |
| MF | 21 | Amílcar Henríquez |
| MF | 11 | Armando Cooper | | (substituted off) 84' |
| FW | 18 | Luis Tejada | | (substituted off) 81' |
| FW | 7 | Blas Pérez |
Substitutions:
| MF | 8 | Gabriel Torres | | (substituted on) 70' |
| MF | 22 | Eybir Bonaga | | (substituted on) 81' |
| MF | 19 | Alberto Quintero | | (substituted on) 84' |
Manager:
Julio Dely Valdés

Assistant referees:
José Luis Camargo (Mexico)
Alberto Morín Méndez (Mexico)
Fourth official:
Jeffrey Solís (Costa Rica)

=== Canada vs Panama ===
June 14, 2011
19:00 (18:00 UTC−5)

| Canada | 1–1 | Panama |
|---|---|---|
| De Rosario 62' (pen.) | Report | Tejada 90+1' |

Livestrong Sporting Park, Kansas City
Attendance: 20,109
Referee: Walter López (Guatemala)

| Canada | Panama |

| GK | 18 | Milan Borjan |
| DF | 4 | Kevin McKenna (c) |
| DF | 5 | André Hainault |
| DF | 3 | Mike Klukowski |
| MF | 8 | Will Johnson | | (substituted off) 85' |
| MF | 6 | Julian de Guzman |
| MF | 14 | Dwayne De Rosario |
| MF | 2 | Nik Ledgerwood |
| MF | 11 | Josh Simpson | (yellow card) 51' | (substituted off) 73' |
| MF | 7 | Terry Dunfield | (yellow card) 58' |
| FW | 17 | Simeon Jackson |
Substitutions:
| FW | 16 | Tosaint Ricketts | | (substituted on) 73' |
| MF | 12 | Pedro Pacheco | | (substituted on) 85' |
Manager:
(Trinidad and Tobago) Stephen Hart

| GK | 12 | Luis Mejía |
| DF | 23 | Felipe Baloy (c) |
| DF | 17 | Luis Henríquez |
| DF | 14 | Eduardo Dasent |
| DF | 13 | Adolfo Machado |
| MF | 15 | Eric Davis |
| MF | 6 | Gabriel Gómez |
| MF | 19 | Alberto Quintero | | (substituted off) 67' |
| MF | 22 | Eybir Bonaga | (yellow card) 61' | (substituted off) 79' |
| FW | 7 | Blas Pérez | (yellow card) 62' |
| FW | 16 | Luis Rentería | | (substituted off) 71' |
Substitutions:
| MF | 11 | Armando Cooper | | (substituted on) 67' |
| FW | 18 | Luis Tejada | | (substituted on) 71' |
| MF | 20 | Aníbal Godoy | | (substituted on) 79' |
Manager:
Julio Dely Valdés

Assistant referees:
Gerson López (Guatemala)
Hermenerito Leal (Guatemala)
Fourth official:
Marco Rodríguez (Mexico)

=== Guadeloupe vs United States ===
June 14, 2011
21:00 (20:00 UTC−5)

| Guadeloupe | 0–1 | United States |
|---|---|---|
| | Report | Altidore 9' |

Livestrong Sporting Park, Kansas City
Attendance: 20,109
Referee: Jeffrey Solís (Costa Rica)

| Guadeloupe | United States |

| GK | 1 | Franck Grandel |
| DF | 3 | Stéphane Zubar | (yellow card) 77' |
| DF | 22 | Mickaël Tacalfred |
| DF | 5 | Eddy Viator | (yellow card) 65' |
| DF | 15 | Julien Ictoi |
| MF | 7 | Loïc Loval | | (substituted off) 26' |
| MF | 12 | Thomas Gamiette |
| MF | 19 | Stéphane Auvray (c) | (yellow card) 89' |
| MF | 10 | Therry Racon | | (substituted off) 73' |
| FW | 21 | Richard Socrier |
| FW | 11 | Livio Nabab | | (substituted off) 60' |
Substitutions:
| MF | 17 | Cédric Collet | | (substituted on) 26' |
| MF | 8 | Dimitri Fautrai | | (substituted on) 60' |
| FW | 9 | Ludovic Gotin | | (substituted on) 73' |
Manager:
Roger Salnot

| GK | 1 | Tim Howard |
| DF | 3 | Carlos Bocanegra (c) |
| DF | 21 | Clarence Goodson |
| DF | 14 | Eric Lichaj |
| DF | 6 | Steve Cherundolo |
| MF | 8 | Clint Dempsey |
| MF | 13 | Jermaine Jones |
| MF | 4 | Michael Bradley | (substituted off) 85' |
| MF | 10 | Landon Donovan |
| FW | 11 | Chris Wondolowski | (substituted off) 64' |
| FW | 17 | Jozy Altidore | (substituted off) 78' |
Substitutions:
| FW | 22 | Alejandro Bedoya | (substituted on) 64' |
| FW | 16 | Sacha Kljestan | (substituted on) 78' |
| MF | 7 | Maurice Edu | (substituted on) 85' |
Manager:
Bob Bradley

Assistant referees:
José Luis Camargo (Mexico)
Alberto Morín Méndez (Mexico)
Fourth official:
Marlon Mejía (El Salvador)

== 2013 CONCACAF Gold Cup ==
=== Group C ===
| Pos | Team | Pld | W | D | L | GF | GA | GD | Pts | Qualification |
|---|---|---|---|---|---|---|---|---|---|---|
| 1 | United States | 3 | 3 | 0 | 0 | 11 | 2 | +9 | 9 | Advance to knockout stage |
| 2 | Costa Rica | 3 | 2 | 0 | 1 | 4 | 1 | +3 | 6 | Advance to knockout stage |
| 3 | Cuba | 3 | 1 | 0 | 2 | 5 | 7 | −2 | 3 | Advance to knockout stage |
| 4 | Belize | 3 | 0 | 0 | 3 | 1 | 11 | −10 | 0 | |

July 9, 2013
20:30

| Costa Rica | 3–0 | Cuba |
|---|---|---|
| Barrantes 52', 77'; Arrieta 71' | Report |

Jeld-Wen Field, Portland
Attendance: 18,724
Referee: Elmer Bonilla (El Salvador)
July 9, 2013
23:00

| Belize | 1–6 | United States |
|---|---|---|
| Gaynair 40' | Report | Wondolowski 12', 37', 41'; Holden 58'; Orozco 72'; Donovan 76' (pen.) |

Jeld-Wen Field, Portland
Attendance: 18,724
Referee: Héctor Rodríguez (Honduras)
July 13, 2013
15:30

| United States | 4–1 | Cuba |
|---|---|---|
| Donovan 45+2' (pen.); Corona 57'; Wondolowski 66', 85' | Report | Alfonso 36' |

Rio Tinto Stadium, Sandy
Attendance: 17,597
Referee: David Gantar (Canada)
July 13, 2013
18:00

| Costa Rica | 1–0 | Belize |
|---|---|---|
| Eiley 49' (o.g.) | Report |

Rio Tinto Stadium, Sandy
Attendance: 17,597
Referee: Enrico Wijngaarde (Suriname)
July 16, 2013
17:30

| Cuba | 4–0 | Belize |
|---|---|---|
| Martínez 38', 62', 84'; Márquez 90+3' | Report |

Rentschler Field, East Hartford
Attendance: 25,432
Referee: Enrico Wijngaarde (Suriname)
July 16, 2013
20:00

| United States | 1–0 | Costa Rica |
|---|---|---|
| Shea 82' | Report |

Rentschler Field, East Hartford
Attendance: 25,432
Referee: Courtney Campbell (Jamaica)
9 July 2013
23:00

| Belize | 1–6 | United States |
|---|---|---|
| Gaynair 40' | Report | Wondolowski 12', 37', 41'; Holden 58'; Orozco 72'; Donovan 76' (pen.) |

Jeld-Wen Field, Portland
Attendance: 18,724
Referee: Héctor Rodríguez (Honduras)

13 July 2013
15:30

| United States | 4–1 | Cuba |
|---|---|---|
| Donovan 45+2' (pen.); Corona 57'; Wondolowski 66', 85' | Report | Alfonso 36' |

Rio Tinto Stadium, Sandy
Attendance: 17,597
Referee: David Gantar (Canada)

16 July 2013
20:00

| United States | 1–0 | Costa Rica |
|---|---|---|
| Shea 82' | Report |

Rentschler Field, East Hartford
Attendance: 25,432
Referee: Courtney Campbell (Jamaica)

=== Quarter-finals ===
21 July 2013
16:00

| United States | 5–1 | El Salvador |
|---|---|---|
| Goodson 21'; Corona 29'; E. Johnson 60'; Donovan 78'; Diskerud 83' | Report | Zelaya 39' (pen.) |

M&T Bank Stadium, Baltimore
Attendance: 70,540
Referee: Enrico Wijngaarde (Suriname)

=== Semi-finals ===
24 July 2013
19:00

| United States | 3–1 | Honduras |
|---|---|---|
| E. Johnson 11'; Donovan 27', 53' | Report | Medina 52' |

Cowboys Stadium, Arlington
Attendance: 81,410
Referee: Wálter Quesada (Costa Rica)

=== Final ===
28 July 2013
16:00

| United States | 1–0 | Panama |
|---|---|---|
| Shea 69' | Report |

Soldier Field, Chicago
Attendance: 57,920
Referee: Joel Aguilar (El Salvador)

== 2015 CONCACAF Gold Cup ==
=== Group A ===
| Pos | Team | Pld | W | D | L | GF | GA | GD | Pts | Qualification |
|---|---|---|---|---|---|---|---|---|---|---|
| 1 | United States (H) | 3 | 2 | 1 | 0 | 4 | 2 | +2 | 7 | Advance to knockout stage |
| 2 | Haiti | 3 | 1 | 1 | 1 | 2 | 2 | 0 | 4 | Advance to knockout stage |
| 3 | Panama | 3 | 0 | 3 | 0 | 3 | 3 | 0 | 3 | Advance to knockout stage |
| 4 | Honduras | 3 | 0 | 1 | 2 | 2 | 4 | −2 | 1 | |

Source: CONCACAF
(H) Hosts
July 7, 2015
21:30 (20:30 CDT)

| United States | 2–1 | Honduras |
|---|---|---|
| Dempsey 25', 64' | Report | Discua 69' |

Toyota Stadium, Frisco
Attendance: 22,357
Referee: César Ramos (Mexico)

July 10, 2015
20:30

| United States | 1–0 | Haiti |
|---|---|---|
| Dempsey 47' | Report |

Gillette Stadium, Foxborough
Attendance: 46,720
Referee: Ricardo Montero (Costa Rica)

July 13, 2015
21:30 (20:30 CDT)

| Panama | 1–1 | United States |
|---|---|---|
| Pérez 34' | Report | Bradley 55' |

Sporting Park, Kansas City
Attendance: 18,467
Referee: Roberto García (Mexico)

=== Quarter-finals ===
July 18, 2015
17:00

| United States | 6–0 | Cuba |
|---|---|---|
| Dempsey 4', 64' (pen.), 78'; Zardes 15'; Jóhannsson 32'; Gonzalez 45' | Report |

M&T Bank Stadium, Baltimore
Attendance: 37,994
Referee: Henry Bejarano (Costa Rica)

=== Semi-finals ===
July 22, 2015
18:00

| United States | 1–2 | Jamaica |
|---|---|---|
| Bradley 48' | Report | Mattocks 31'; Barnes 36' |

Georgia Dome, Atlanta
Attendance: 70,511
Referee: Ricardo Montero (Costa Rica)

=== Third place match ===
July 25, 2015
16:00

| United States | 1–1 (a.e.t.) | Panama |
|---|---|---|
| Dempsey 70' | Report | Nurse 55' |
Penalties
| Jóhannsson (penalty scored); Dempsey (penalty scored); Johnson (penalty missed); Bradley (penalty missed); Beasley (penalty missed) | 2–3 | (penalty scored) R. Torres; (penalty scored) Arroyo; (penalty missed) Cooper; (penalty scored) Cummings |

PPL Park, Chester
Attendance: 12,598
Referee: Óscar Moncada (Honduras)

== 2017 CONCACAF Gold Cup ==
=== Group B ===
| Pos | Team | Pld | W | D | L | GF | GA | GD | Pts | Qualification |
|---|---|---|---|---|---|---|---|---|---|---|
| 1 | United States (H) | 3 | 2 | 1 | 0 | 7 | 3 | +4 | 7 | Advance to knockout stage |
| 2 | Panama | 3 | 2 | 1 | 0 | 6 | 2 | +4 | 7 | Advance to knockout stage |
| 3 | Martinique | 3 | 1 | 0 | 2 | 4 | 6 | −2 | 3 | |
| 4 | Nicaragua | 3 | 0 | 0 | 3 | 1 | 7 | −6 | 0 | |

Source: CONCACAF
(H) Hosts
July 8, 2017
16:30
15:30 CDT (UTC−5)

| United States | 1–1 | Panama |
|---|---|---|
| Dwyer 50' | Report | Camargo 60' |

Nissan Stadium, Nashville
Attendance: 47,622
Referee: Fernando Guerrero (Mexico)

July 12, 2017
20:30

| United States | 3–2 | Martinique |
|---|---|---|
| O. Gonzalez 53'; Morris 64', 76' | Report | Parsemain 66', 74' |

Raymond James Stadium, Tampa
Attendance: 23,368
Referee: Henry Bejarano (Costa Rica)

July 15, 2017
19:00

| Nicaragua | 0–3 | United States |
|---|---|---|
| | Report | Corona 37'; Rowe 56'; Miazga 88' |

FirstEnergy Stadium, Cleveland
Attendance: 27,934
Referee: Melvin Matamoros (Honduras)

=== Quarter-finals ===
July 19, 2017
21:00

| United States | 2–0 | El Salvador |
|---|---|---|
| O. Gonzalez 41'; Lichaj 45+2' | Report |

Lincoln Financial Field, Philadelphia
Attendance: 31,615
Referee: Drew Fischer (Canada)

=== Semi-finals ===
July 22, 2017
22:00
21:00 CDT (UTC−5)

| Costa Rica | 0–2 | United States |
|---|---|---|
| | Report | Altidore 72'; Dempsey 82' |

AT&T Stadium, Arlington
Attendance: 45,516
Referee: Joel Aguilar (El Salvador)

=== Final ===
July 26, 2017
21:30
18:30 PDT (UTC−7)

| United States | 2–1 | Jamaica |
|---|---|---|
| Altidore 45'; Morris 88' | Report | Watson 50' |

Levi's Stadium, Santa Clara
Attendance: 63,032
Referee: Walter López (Guatemala)

== 2019 CONCACAF Gold Cup ==
=== Group D ===
| Pos | Team | Pld | W | D | L | GF | GA | GD | Pts | Qualification |
|---|---|---|---|---|---|---|---|---|---|---|
| 1 | United States (H) | 3 | 3 | 0 | 0 | 11 | 0 | +11 | 9 | Advance to knockout stage |
| 2 | Panama | 3 | 2 | 0 | 1 | 6 | 3 | +3 | 6 | Advance to knockout stage |
| 3 | Guyana | 3 | 0 | 1 | 2 | 3 | 9 | −6 | 1 | |
| 4 | Trinidad and Tobago | 3 | 0 | 1 | 2 | 1 | 9 | −8 | 1 | |

Source: CONCACAF
(H) Hosts
18 June 2019
22:00 (21:00 UTC−5)

| United States | 4–0 | Guyana |
|---|---|---|
| Arriola 28'; Boyd 51', 81'; Zardes 55' | Report |

Allianz Field, Saint Paul
Attendance: 19,418
Referee: Iván Barton (El Salvador)

22 June 2019
20:00

| United States | 6–0 | Trinidad and Tobago |
|---|---|---|
| Long 41', 90'; Zardes 66', 69'; Pulisic 73'; Arriola 78' | Report |

FirstEnergy Stadium, Cleveland
Attendance: 23,921
Referee: Saíd Martínez (Honduras)

26 June 2019
21:00 (20:00 UTC−5)

| Panama | 0–1 | United States |
|---|---|---|
| | Report | Altidore 66' |

Children's Mercy Park, Kansas City
Attendance: 17,037
Referee: Abdulrahman Al-Jassim (Qatar)

=== Quarter-finals ===
30 June 2019
20:00

| United States | 1–0 | Curaçao |
|---|---|---|
| McKennie 25' | Report |

Lincoln Financial Field, Philadelphia
Attendance: 26,233
Referee: Adonai Escobedo (Mexico)

=== Semi-finals ===
3 July 2019
21:30 (20:30 UTC−5)

| Jamaica | 1–3 | United States |
|---|---|---|
| Nicholson 69' | Report | McKennie 9'; Pulisic 52', 87' |

Nissan Stadium, Nashville
Attendance: 28,473
Referee: Iván Barton (El Salvador)

=== Final ===
July 7, 2019
21:15 (20:15 UTC−5)

| Mexico | 1–0 | United States |
|---|---|---|
| Dos Santos 73' | Report |

Soldier Field, Chicago
Attendance: 62,493
Referee: Mario Escobar (Guatemala)

== 2021 CONCACAF Gold Cup ==
=== Group B ===
| Pos | Team | Pld | W | D | L | GF | GA | GD | Pts | Qualification |
|---|---|---|---|---|---|---|---|---|---|---|
| 1 | United States (H) | 3 | 3 | 0 | 0 | 8 | 1 | +7 | 9 | Advance to knockout stage |
| 2 | Canada | 3 | 2 | 0 | 1 | 8 | 3 | +5 | 6 | Advance to knockout stage |
| 3 | Haiti | 3 | 1 | 0 | 2 | 3 | 6 | −3 | 3 | |
| 4 | Martinique | 3 | 0 | 0 | 3 | 3 | 12 | −9 | 0 | |

Source: CONCACAF
(H) Hosts
11 July 2021
21:00 (20:00 UTC−5)

| United States | 1–0 | Haiti |
|---|---|---|
| Vines 8' | Report |

Children's Mercy Park, Kansas City
Attendance: 12,664
Referee: Saíd Martínez (Honduras)

15 July 2021
22:00 (21:00 UTC−5)

| Martinique | 1–6 | United States |
|---|---|---|
| Rivière 64' (pen.) | Report | Dike 14', 59'; Camille 23' (o.g.); Robinson 50'; Zardes 70'; Gioacchini 90' |

Children's Mercy Park, Kansas City
Attendance: 7,511
Referee: Mario Escobar (Guatemala)

18 July 2021
17:00 (16:00 UTC−5)

| United States | 1–0 | Canada |
|---|---|---|
| Moore 1' | Report |

Children's Mercy Park, Kansas City
Attendance: 18,467
Referee: Adonai Escobedo (Mexico)

=== Quarter-finals ===
25 July 2021
21:30 (20:30 UTC−5)

| United States | 1–0 | Jamaica |
|---|---|---|
| Hoppe 83' | Report |

AT&T Stadium, Arlington
Attendance: 41,318
Referee: César Ramos (Mexico)

=== Semi-finals ===
29 July 2021
19:30 (18:30 UTC−5)

| Qatar | 0–1 | United States |
|---|---|---|
| | Report | Zardes 86' |

Q2 Stadium, Austin
Attendance: 20,500
Referee: Juan Gabriel Calderón (Costa Rica)

=== Final ===
August 1, 2021
21:00 (18:00 UTC−7)

| United States | 1–0 (a.e.t.) | Mexico |
|---|---|---|
| Robinson 117' | Report |

Allegiant Stadium, Paradise
Attendance: 61,114
Referee: Saíd Martínez (Honduras)

== 2023 CONCACAF Gold Cup ==
=== Group A ===
| Pos | Team | Pld | W | D | L | GF | GA | GD | Pts | Qualification |
|---|---|---|---|---|---|---|---|---|---|---|
| 1 | United States (H) | 3 | 2 | 1 | 0 | 13 | 1 | +12 | 7 | Advance to knockout stage |
| 2 | Jamaica | 3 | 2 | 1 | 0 | 10 | 2 | +8 | 7 | Advance to knockout stage |
| 3 | Trinidad and Tobago | 3 | 1 | 0 | 2 | 4 | 10 | −6 | 3 | |
| 4 | Saint Kitts and Nevis | 3 | 0 | 0 | 3 | 0 | 14 | −14 | 0 | |

Source: CONCACAF
Rules for classification: Tiebreakers
(H) Co-host
June 24, 2023
22:06 (21:06 UTC−5) (Note: The United States vs Jamaica match, originally scheduled at 21:30 EDT (UTC−4), was re-scheduled for 22:06 EDT.)

| United States | 1–1 | Jamaica |
|---|---|---|
| Vázquez 88' | Report | Lowe 13' |

Soldier Field, Chicago
Attendance: 36,666
Referee: César Ramos (Mexico)

June 28, 2023
21:30 (20:30 UTC−5)

| Saint Kitts and Nevis | 0–6 | United States |
|---|---|---|
| | Report | Mihailovic 12', 79'; Reynolds 14'; Ferreira 16', 25', 50' |

CityPark, St. Louis
Attendance: 21,216
Referee: Juan Gabriel Calderón (Costa Rica)

July 2, 2023
19:00

| United States | 6–0 | Trinidad and Tobago |
|---|---|---|
| Ferreira 14', 38', 45+3' (pen.); Cowell 65'; Busio 79'; Vázquez 90+4' | Report |

Bank of America Stadium, Charlotte
Attendance: 47,382
Referee: Mario Escobar (Guatemala)

=== Quarter-finals ===
July 9, 2023
19:30

| United States | 2–2 (a.e.t.) | Canada |
|---|---|---|
| Vázquez 88'; Kennedy 114' (o.g.) | Report | Vitória 90+3' (pen.); Shaffelburg 109' |
Penalties
| Vázquez (penalty missed); Cowell (penalty scored); Busio (penalty scored); Ferreira (penalty scored) | 3–2 | (penalty missed) Vitória; (penalty missed) Fraser; (penalty scored) Miller; (penalty scored) Russell-Rowe; (penalty missed) Brym |

TQL Stadium, Cincinnati
Attendance: 24,979
Referee: Marco Ortíz (Mexico)

=== Semi-finals ===
July 12, 2023
19:30 (16:30 UTC−7)

| United States | 1–1 (a.e.t.) | Panama |
|---|---|---|
| Ferreira 105' | Report | I. Anderson 99' |
Penalties
| Ferreira (penalty missed); Mihailovic (penalty scored); Morris (penalty scored); Gressel (penalty scored); Miazga (penalty scored); Roldan (penalty missed) | 4–5 | (penalty scored) Escobar; (penalty scored) Díaz; (penalty missed) Martínez; (penalty scored) Bárcenas; (penalty scored) Waterman; (penalty scored) Carrasquilla |

Snapdragon Stadium, San Diego
Attendance: 31,690
Referee: Walter López (Guatemala)

== 2025 CONCACAF Gold Cup ==
=== Group D ===
| Pos | Team | Pld | W | D | L | GF | GA | GD | Pts | Qualification |
|---|---|---|---|---|---|---|---|---|---|---|
| 1 | United States (H) | 3 | 3 | 0 | 0 | 8 | 1 | +7 | 9 | Advance to knockout stage |
| 2 | Saudi Arabia | 3 | 1 | 1 | 1 | 2 | 2 | 0 | 4 | Advance to knockout stage |
| 3 | Trinidad and Tobago | 3 | 0 | 2 | 1 | 2 | 7 | −5 | 2 | |
| 4 | Haiti | 3 | 0 | 1 | 2 | 2 | 4 | −2 | 1 | |

Source: CONCACAF
Rules for classification: Tiebreakers
(H) Co-host
June 15, 2025
18:00 (15:00 UTC−7)

| United States | 5–0 | Trinidad and Tobago |
|---|---|---|
| Tillman 16', 41'; Agyemang 44'; B. Aaronson 82'; Wright 84' | Report |

PayPal Park, San Jose
Attendance: 12,610
Referee: Adonai Escobedo (Mexico)

June 19, 2025
21:15 (20:15 UTC−5)

| Saudi Arabia | 0–1 | United States |
|---|---|---|
| | Report | Richards 63' |

Q2 Stadium, Austin
Attendance: 11,727
Referee: Marco Ortíz (Mexico)

June 22, 2025
19:00 (18:00 UTC−5)

| United States | 2–1 | Haiti |
|---|---|---|
| Tillman 10'; Agyemang 75' | Report | Deedson 19' |

AT&T Stadium, Arlington
Attendance: 20,918
Referee: Katia García (Mexico)

=== Quarter-finals ===
June 29, 2025
19:00 (18:00 UTC−5)

| United States | 2–2 | Costa Rica |
|---|---|---|
| Luna 43'; Arfsten 47' | Report | Calvo 12' (pen.); Martínez 71' |
Penalties
| Adams (penalty scored); Tillman (penalty scored); Berhalter (penalty missed); Freeman (penalty scored); Tolkin (penalty missed); Downs (penalty scored) | 4–3 | (penalty scored) Martínez; (penalty missed) J. Vargas; (penalty scored) Van der Putten; (penalty scored) Brenes; (penalty missed) Calvo; (penalty missed) Rojas |

U.S. Bank Stadium, Minneapolis
Attendance: 32,289
Referee: Walter López (Guatemala)

=== Semi-finals ===
July 2, 2025
19:00 (18:00 UTC−5)

| United States | 2–1 | Guatemala |
|---|---|---|
| Luna 4', 15' | Report | Escobar 80' |

Energizer Park, St. Louis
Attendance: 22,423
Referee: Oshane Nation (Jamaica)

=== Final ===
July 6, 2025
19:00 (18:00 UTC−5)

| United States | 1–2 | Mexico |
|---|---|---|
| Richards 4' | Report | Jiménez 27'; Ed. Álvarez 77' |

NRG Stadium, Houston
Attendance: 70,925
Referee: Mario Escobar (Guatemala)

== Record players ==
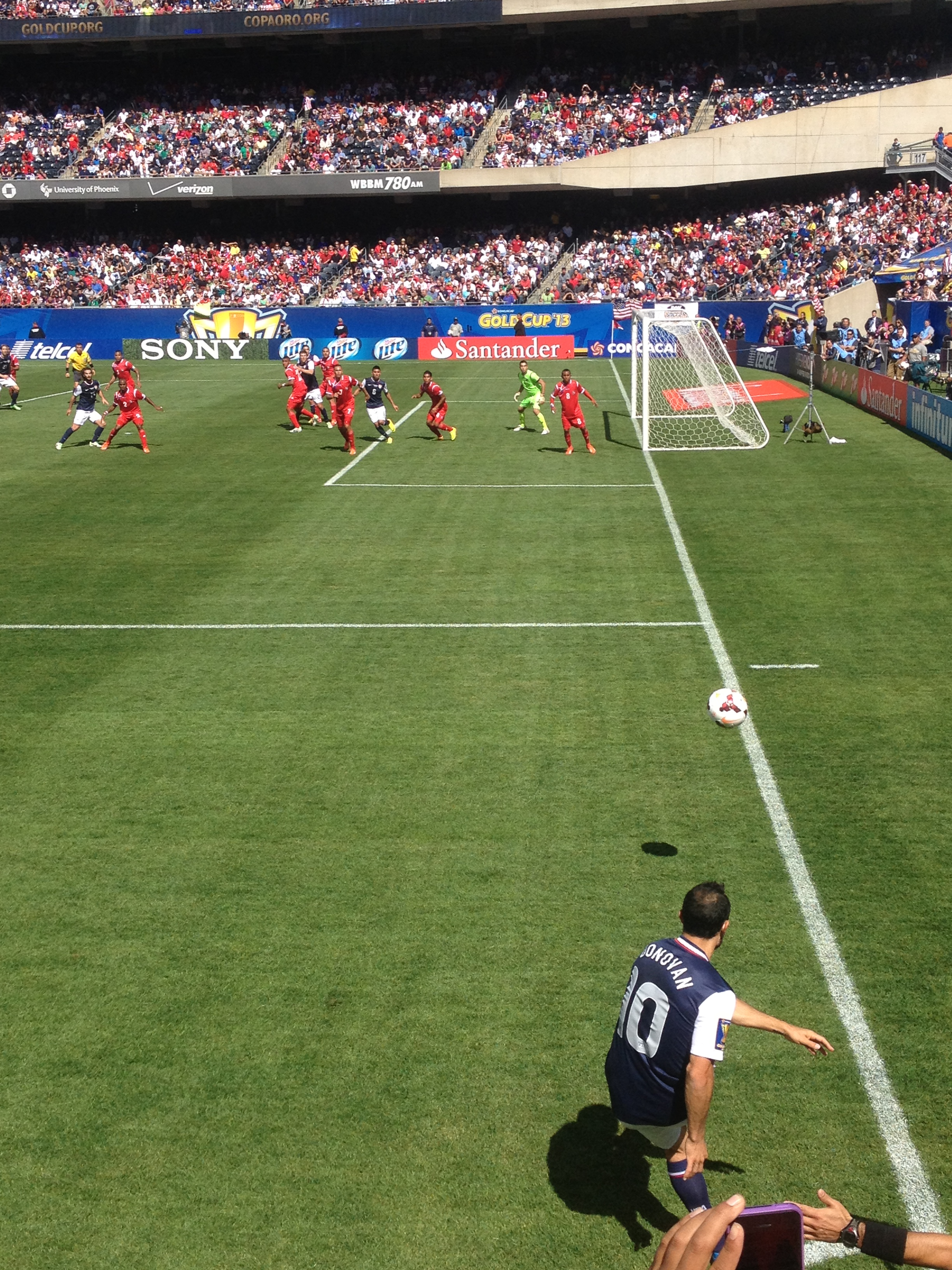
Landon Donovan, CONCACAF's record player and scorer at continental championships, taking a corner kick in the 2013 final. The 1–0 victory over Panama ensured his fourth Gold Cup title.

Landon Donovan is both the CONCACAF Gold Cup's record player and scorer with 18 goals in 34 matches. In addition, he and DaMarcus Beasley are the only players to win the Gold Cup four times.

| Rank | Player | Matches | Gold Cups |
|---|---|---|---|
| 1 | Landon Donovan | 34 | 2002, 2003, 2005, 2007, 2011 and 2013 |
| 2 | Michael Bradley | 25 | 2007, 2011, 2015, 2017 and 2019 |
| 3 | Clint Dempsey | 24 | 2005, 2007, 2011, 2015 and 2017 |
| 4 | Kasey Keller | 23 | 1996, 1998, 2002, 2003, 2005 and 2007 |
| 4 | DaMarcus Beasley | 23 | 2002, 2003, 2005, 2007, 2013 and 2015 |
| 6 | Gyasi Zardes | 22 | 2015, 2017, 2019 and 2021 |
| 7 | Eric Wynalda | 21 | 1991, 1993, 1996, 1998 and 2000 |
| 7 | Frankie Hejduk | 21 | 1998, 2002, 2003, 2005 and 2007 |
| 9 | Cobi Jones | 20 | 1993, 1996, 1998, 2000 and 2002 |
| 10 | John Harkes | 19 | 1989, 1993, 1996 and 1998 |
| 10 | Carlos Bocanegra | 19 | 2002, 2003, 2007 and 2011 |

== Top goalscorers ==
Landon Donovan is not only the CONCACAF Gold Cup's record scorer, but is also the only player to score at six separate tournaments, and the only player to be (shared) top scorer at three tournaments.

In 2007, he scored all his four goals from the penalty spot.

| Rank | Player | Goals | Gold Cups (goals) |
|---|---|---|---|
| 1 | Landon Donovan | 18 | 2002 (1), 2003 (4), 2005 (3), 2007 (4), 2011 (1) and 2013 (5) |
| 2 | Clint Dempsey | 13 | 2005 (1), 2007 (1), 2011 (3), 2015 (7) and 2017 (1) |
| 3 | Eric Wynalda | 9 | 1991 (1), 1993 (2), 1996 (4), 1998 (1) and 2000 (1) |
| 4 | Brian McBride | 8 | 2000 (1), 2002 (4) and 2003 (3) |
| 5 | Jesús Ferreira | 7 | 2023 |
| 6 | DaMarcus Beasley | 6 | 2002 (1), 2005 (3) and 2007 (2) |
| 6 | Gyasi Zardes | 6 | 2015 (1), 2019 (3) and 2021 (2) |
| 8 | Chris Wondolowski | 5 | 2013 |
| 8 | Jozy Altidore | 5 | 2011 (2), 2017 (2) and 2019 (1) |
| 10 | Bruce Murray | 3 | 1989 (1) and 1991 (2) |
| 10 | Carlos Bocanegra | 3 | 2003 (2) and 2007 (1) |
| 10 | Eddie Johnson | 3 | 2007 (1) and 2013 (2) |
| 10 | Stuart Holden | 3 | 2009 (2) and 2013 (1) |
| 10 | Clarence Goodson | 3 | 2009, 2011 and 2013 |
| 10 | Michael Bradley | 3 | 2011 (1) and 2015 (2) |
| 10 | Joe Corona | 3 | 2013 (2) and 2017 (1) |
| 10 | Omar Gonzalez | 3 | 2015 (1) and 2017 (2) |
| 10 | Jordan Morris | 3 | 2017 |
| 10 | Christian Pulisic | 3 | 2019 |
| 10 | Brandon Vázquez | 3 | 2023 |
| 10 | Diego Luna | 3 | 2025 |
| 10 | Malik Tillman | 3 | 2025 |

== Awards and records ==
=== Team awards ===
- Champions: 1991, 2002, 2005, 2007, 2013, 2017, 2021
- Runners-up: 1989, 1993, 1998, 2009, 2011, 2019, 2025
- Third place: 1996, 2003
- Fair Play Award: 2003, 2009, 2017, 2019, 2021, 2023, 2025

=== Individual awards ===
- Most Valuable Player:
  - Brian McBride (2002)
  - Landon Donovan (2013)
  - Michael Bradley (2017)
- Golden Boot:
  - Eric Wynalda (1996, 4 goals)
  - Brian McBride (2002, 4 goals)
  - Landon Donovan (2003, 4 goals) (shared)
  - DaMarcus Beasley (2005, 3 goals)
  - Landon Donovan (2013, 5 goals) (shared)
  - Chris Wondolowski (2013, 5 goals) (shared)
  - Clint Dempsey (2015, 7 goals)
  - Jesús Ferreira (2023, 7 goals)
- Best Goalkeeper:
  - Brad Guzan (2015)
  - Matt Turner (2021)
- Best Young Player:
  - Christian Pulisic (2019)

=== Team records ===
- Most finals played in a row (5: 2005–2013)
- Most Top 3 finishes in a row (7: 2002–2013)
- Highest defeat in a final (0–5 against Mexico, 2009)

=== Individual records ===
- Most titles as player: Landon Donovan and DaMarcus Beasley (4: 2002, 2005, 2007 and 2013)
- Most titles as manager: Bruce Arena (3: 2002, 2005 and 2017)
- Most matches played: Landon Donovan (34: 2002–2013)
- Most goals scored: Landon Donovan (18: 2002–2013)
- Longest time span between first and last goal: Clint Dempsey (12 years, 15 days: July 7, 2005 – July 22, 2017)

== See also ==
- United States at the Copa América
- United States at the FIFA Confederations Cup
- United States at the FIFA World Cup
