= Belize at the CONCACAF Gold Cup =

The CONCACAF Gold Cup is North America's major tournament in senior men's football and determines the continental champion. Until 1989, the tournament was known as CONCACAF Championship. It is currently held every two years. From 1996 to 2005, nations from other confederations have regularly joined the tournament as invitees. In earlier editions, the continental championship was held in different countries, but since the inception of the Gold Cup in 1991, the United States are constant hosts or co-hosts.

From 1973 to 1989, the tournament doubled as the confederation's World Cup qualification. CONCACAF's representative team at the FIFA Confederations Cup was decided by a play-off between the winners of the last two tournament editions in 2015 via the CONCACAF Cup, but was then discontinued along with the Confederations Cup.

Since the inaugural tournament in 1963, the Gold Cup was held 28 times and has been won by seven different nations, most often by Mexico (13 titles).

It took Belize fourteen years from their independence in 1981 to their debut in international football in 1995. Since then, they have entered the tournament continuously, but only qualified once in 2003. Losing all three matches, they placed last in the tournament and are ranked 29th out of 31 nations in the all-time table.

== Record at the CONCACAF Championship & Gold Cup ==
CONCACAF Championship & CONCACAF Gold Cup record										Qualification record					
Year	Round	Position	Pld	W	D	L	GF	GA	Squad	Pld	W	D	L	GF	GA
(El Salvador) 1963	Part of United Kingdom									Part of United Kingdom					
(Guatemala) 1965	Part of United Kingdom									Part of United Kingdom					
(Honduras) 1967	Part of United Kingdom									Part of United Kingdom					
(Costa Rica) 1969	Part of United Kingdom									Part of United Kingdom					
(Trinidad and Tobago) 1971	Part of United Kingdom									Part of United Kingdom					
(Haiti) 1973	Part of United Kingdom									Part of United Kingdom					
(Mexico) 1977	Part of United Kingdom									Part of United Kingdom					
(Honduras) 1981	Part of United Kingdom									Part of United Kingdom					
1985	Not a CONCACAF member									Not a CONCACAF member					
1989	Did not enter									Did not enter					
(United States) 1991	Did not enter									Did not enter					
(Mexico) (United States) 1993	Did not enter									Did not enter					
(United States) 1996	Did not qualify									2	0	0	2	1	5
(United States) 1998	Did not qualify									2	0	1	1	1	2
(United States) 2000	Did not qualify									2	0	0	2	1	12
(United States) 2002	Did not qualify									2	0	1	1	3	7
(Mexico) (United States) 2003	Did not enter									Did not enter					
(United States) 2005	Did not qualify									3	0	0	3	0	7
(United States) 2007	Did not qualify									3	0	0	3	3	7
(United States) 2009	Did not qualify									3	0	1	2	3	7
(United States) 2011	Did not qualify									3	0	1	2	3	8
(United States) 2013	Group stage	12th	3	0	0	3	1	11	Squad	5	1	1	3	2	4
(Canada) (United States) 2015	Did not qualify									3	0	0	3	1	6
(United States) 2017	Did not qualify									5	0	1	4	2	10
(Costa Rica) (Jamaica) (United States) 2019	Did not qualify									4	2	0	2	6	3
(United States) 2021	Did not qualify									6	2	0	4	6	12
(Canada) (United States) 2023	Did not qualify									6	0	1	5	2	10
(Canada) (United States) 2025	Did not qualify									6	5	1	2	14	16
Total	Group stage	1/28	3	0	0	3	1	11	—	55	10	6	41	47	116

== 2013 CONCACAF Gold Cup ==
=== Group stage ===
Pos	Team	Pld	W	D	L	GF	GA	GD	Pts	Qualification
1	United States	3	3	0	0	11	2	+9	9	Advance to knockout stage
2	Costa Rica	3	2	0	1	4	1	+3	6	Advance to knockout stage
3	Cuba	3	1	0	2	5	7	−2	3	Advance to knockout stage
4	Belize	3	0	0	3	1	11	−10	0	

2013 Gold Cup
9 July 2013
11:00 PST
Group Stage

Belize	1–6	United States
Gaynair 40'	Report	Wondolowski 12', 37', 41'; Holden 58'; Orozco 72'; Donovan 76' (pen.)

Jeld-Wen Field, Portland
Attendance: 18,724
Referee: Héctor Rodríguez (Honduras)
2013 CONCACAF Gold Cup
13 July 2013
Group Stage

Costa Rica	1–0	Belize
Eiley 49' (o.g.)	Report	0

Rio Tinto Stadium, Sandy
Attendance: 17,597
Referee: Enrico Wijngaarde (Suriname)
16 July 2013

Cuba	4–0	Belize
Martínez 38', 62', 84'; Márquez 90+3'	Report

Rentschler Field, East Hartford
Attendance: 25,432
Referee: Enrico Wijngaarde (Suriname)

== Record players ==
Nine players have been fielded in all three matches at Belize's only Gold Cup appearance.

Rank	Player	Matches
1	Dalton Eiley	3
1	Ian Gaynair	3
1	Trevor Lennan	3
1	Evan Mariano	3
1	Deon McCaulay	3
1	Tyrone Pandy	3
1	Michael Salazar	3
1	Elroy Smith	3
1	Evral Trapp	3

== Top goalscorers ==
During their 1–6 defeat against the United States, Ian Gaynair scored the only Belizean goal in Gold Cup history.

Rank	Player	Goals
1	Ian Gaynair	1
