= 2013 CONCACAF Gold Cup Group C =

Group C of the 2013 CONCACAF Gold Cup was one of three groups competing at the tournament. The group's first round of matches were played on July 9, with the final round played on July 16. All six group matches were played at venues in the United States: in Portland, Oregon, in Sandy, Utah, and in East Hartford, Connecticut. The group consisted of hosts and four-time Gold Cup champions the United States, as well as Belize, Costa Rica and Cuba. Three members of the Belizean team told FIFA officials that they were offered a bribe to throw their match against the United States. They declined the offer and a subsequent offer to not report the bribery attempt.

== Standings ==
Key to colors in group tables
Teams that advanced to the quarter-finals: Group winners; Group runners-up; Best two third-placed teams among all groups

Pos	Team	Pld	W	D	L	GF	GA	GD	Pts	Qualification
1	United States	3	3	0	0	11	2	+9	9	Advance to knockout stage
2	Costa Rica	3	2	0	1	4	1	+3	6	Advance to knockout stage
3	Cuba	3	1	0	2	5	7	−2	3	Advance to knockout stage
4	Belize	3	0	0	3	1	11	−10	0	

== Matches ==
All times are EDT (UTC−4).

=== Costa Rica vs Cuba ===
July 9, 2013
20:30

Costa Rica	3–0	Cuba
Barrantes 52', 77'; Arrieta 71'	Report

Jeld-Wen Field, Portland
Attendance: 18,724
Referee: Elmer Bonilla (El Salvador)

Costa Rica	Cuba

GK	18	Patrick Pemberton
RB	6	Juan Diego Madrigal
CB	19	Roy Miller
CB	14	Christopher Meneses
LB	4	Michael Umaña
CM	17	Yeltsin Tejeda
CM	20	Rodney Wallace	(substituted off) 58'
RW	11	Michael Barrantes
LW	10	Osvaldo Rodríguez	(substituted off) 64'
CF	9	Álvaro Saborío (c)	(substituted off) 79'
CF	22	Jairo Arrieta
Substitutions:
FW	8	Kenny Cunningham	(substituted on) 58'
FW	5	Celso Borges	(substituted on) 64'
FW	12	Yendrick Ruiz	(substituted on) 79'
Manager:
(Colombia) Jorge Luis Pinto

GK	1	Odelín Molina
SW	5	Jorge Luis Clavelo (c)
RB	15	Renay Malblanche
CB	14	Aliannis Urgellés
CB	13	Jorge Luis Corrales
LB	6	Yoel Colomé
CM	20	Alberto Gómez	(substituted off) 78'
CM	8	Jaime Colomé	(substituted off) 71'
RW	11	Ariel Martínez
LW	3	Yénier Márquez
CF	22	Yoandir Puga	(substituted off) 63'
Substitutions:
FW	9	José Ciprian Alfonso	(substituted on) 63'
MF	18	Libán Pérez	(substituted on) 71'
MF	7	Armando Coroneaux	(substituted on) 78'
Manager:
Walter Benítez

Assistant referees:
Joe Fletcher (Canada)
Graeme Browne (Saint Kitts and Nevis)
Fourth official:
David Gantar (Canada)

=== Belize vs United States ===
July 9, 2013
23:00

Belize	1–6	United States
Gaynair 40'	Report	Wondolowski 12', 37', 41'; Holden 58'; Orozco 72'; Donovan 76' (pen.)

Jeld-Wen Field, Portland
Attendance: 18,724
Referee: Héctor Rodríguez (Honduras)

Belize	United States

GK	27	Shane Orio
RB	13	Dalton Eiley
CB	3	Trevor Lennan	(yellow card) 46'	(substituted off) 64'
CB	18	Evral Trapp
LB	16	Ashley Torres		(substituted off) 77'
DM	7	Ian Gaynair
CM	23	Tyrone Pandy
CM	8	Elroy Smith (c)
AM	6	Evan Mariano	(yellow card) 71'
CF	9	Deon McCaulay
CF	10	Harrison Roches		(substituted off) 46'
Substitutions:
MF	2	David Trapp		(substituted on) 46'
MF	28	Harrison Tasher		(substituted on) 64'
FW	11	Michael Salazar		(substituted on) 77'
Manager:
(United States) Ian Mork

GK	1	Nick Rimando
RB	15	Michael Parkhurst
CB	4	Michael Orozco
CB	21	Clarence Goodson
LB	7	DaMarcus Beasley (c)
CM	14	Kyle Beckerman	(substituted off) 46'
CM	8	Mix Diskerud
RW	6	Joe Corona	(substituted off) 66'
LW	16	José Torres	(substituted off) 61'
CF	10	Landon Donovan
CF	19	Chris Wondolowski
Substitutions:
MF	11	Stu Holden	(substituted on) 46'
MF	23	Brek Shea	(substituted on) 61'
MF	20	Alejandro Bedoya	(substituted on) 66'
Manager:
(Germany) Jürgen Klinsmann

Assistant referees:
Hermenerito Leal (Guatemala)
Ramon Ricardo Louisville (Suriname)
Fourth official:
Courtney Campbell (Jamaica)

=== United States vs Cuba ===
July 13, 2013
15:30

United States	4–1	Cuba
Donovan 45+2' (pen.); Corona 57'; Wondolowski 66', 85'	Report	Alfonso 36'

Rio Tinto Stadium, Sandy
Attendance: 17,597
Referee: David Gantar (Canada)

United States	Cuba

GK	1	Nick Rimando
RB	13	Tony Beltran
CB	4	Michael Orozco
CB	5	Oguchi Onyewu (c)
LB	2	Edgar Castillo
DM	14	Kyle Beckerman
RM	6	Joe Corona
CM	11	Stu Holden	(substituted off) 58'
LM	23	Brek Shea	(substituted off) 46'
CF	10	Landon Donovan
CF	9	Herculez Gomez	(substituted off) 58'
Substitutions:
MF	16	José Torres	(substituted on) 46'
MF	8	Mix Diskerud	(substituted on) 58'
FW	19	Chris Wondolowski	(substituted on) 58'
Manager:
(Germany) Jürgen Klinsmann

GK	1	Odelin Molina
RB	5	Jorge Luis Clavelo (c)
CB	13	Jorge Luis Corrales
CB	6	Yoel Colomé	(yellow card) 75'	(substituted off) 78'
LB	15	Renay Malblanche
DM	14	Aliannis Urgellés
RM	8	Jaime Colomé
CM	20	Alberto Gómez		(substituted off) 67'
CM	3	Yénier Márquez	(yellow card) 45+2'
LM	11	Ariel Martínez
CF	9	José Ciprian Alfonso		(substituted off) 62'
Substitutions:
FW	17	Alexei Zuásnabar		(substituted on) 62'
MF	18	Libán Pérez		(substituted on) 67'
MF	10	Miguel Ángel Sánchez		(substituted on) 78'
Manager:
Walter Benítez

Assistant referees:
Joe Fletcher (Canada)
Garnet Page (Jamaica)
Fourth official:
Elmer Bonilla (El Salvador)

=== Costa Rica vs Belize ===
July 13, 2013
18:00

Costa Rica	1–0	Belize
Eiley 49' (o.g.)	Report

Rio Tinto Stadium, Sandy
Attendance: 17,597
Referee: Enrico Wijngaarde (Suriname)

Costa Rica	Belize

GK	18	Patrick Pemberton
RB	4	Michael Umaña
CB	15	Junior Díaz
CB	16	Carlos Johnson
LB	3	Giancarlo González
RM	5	Celso Borges
CM	11	Michael Barrantes	(yellow card) 59'	(substituted off) 60'
CM	13	Ariel Rodríguez	(yellow card) 48'
LM	8	Kenny Cunningham		(substituted off) 68'
CF	22	Jairo Arrieta
CF	9	Álvaro Saborío (c)		(substituted off) 89'
Substitutions:
MF	7	Mauricio Castillo		(substituted on) 60'
MF	10	Osvaldo Rodríguez		(substituted on) 68'
FW	12	Yendrick Ruiz		(substituted on) 89'
Manager:
(Colombia) Jorge Luis Pinto

GK	1	Woodrow West
RB	23	Tyrone Pandy		(substituted off) 61'
CB	7	Ian Gaynair	(yellow card) 40'
CB	13	Dalton Eiley
LB	28	Harrison Tasher		(substituted off) 25'
CM	8	Elroy Smith (c)
CM	18	Evral Trapp
CM	14	Andres Makin Jr.		(substituted off) 75'
RW	6	Evan Mariano
LW	11	Michael Salazar
CF	9	Deon McCaulay
Substitutions:
MF	25	Devon Makin		(substituted on) 25'
MF	3	Trevor Lennan		(substituted on) 61'
FW	10	Harrison Roches		(substituted on) 75'
Manager:
(United States) Ian Mork

Assistant referees:
Ramon Ricardo Louisville (Suriname)
Graeme Browne (Saint Kitts and Nevis)
Fourth official:
Héctor Rodríguez (Honduras)

=== Cuba vs Belize ===
July 16, 2013
17:30

Cuba	4–0	Belize
Martínez 38', 62', 84'; Márquez 90+3'	Report

Rentschler Field, East Hartford
Attendance: 25,432
Referee: Enrico Wijngaarde (Suriname)

Cuba	Belize

GK	1	Odelin Molina
DF	5	Jorge Luis Clavelo (c)	(yellow card) 34'	(substituted off) 68'
DF	14	Aliannis Urgellés		(substituted off) 63'
DF	3	Yénier Márquez
DF	6	Yoel Colomé
DF	15	Renay Malblanche	(yellow card) 47'
DF	13	Jorge Luis Corrales
MF	8	Jaime Colomé
MF	11	Ariel Martínez
MF	20	Alberto Gómez
FW	9	José Ciprian Alfonso		(substituted off) 77'
Substitutions:
MF	18	Libán Pérez	(yellow card) 90+3'	(substituted on) 63'
DF	4	Yasmany López		(substituted on) 68'
FW	22	Yoandir Puga		(substituted on) 77'
Manager:
Walter Benítez

GK	1	Woodrow West
RB	23	Tyrone Pandy
DF	8	Elroy Smith (c)
CB	7	Ian Gaynair	(yellow card) 64' (red card) 81'
CB	13	Dalton Eiley
DF	5	Kahlil Velasquez
DF	12	Cristobal Gilharry		(substituted off) 69'
MF	2	David Trapp
RW	6	Evan Mariano		(substituted off) 50'
LW	11	Michael Salazar		(substituted off) 71'
CF	9	Deon McCaulay
Substitutions:
MF	30	Luis Torres		(substituted on) 50'
DF	18	Evral Trapp	(yellow card) 70'	(substituted on) 69'
MF	3	Trevor Lennan		(substituted on) 71'
Manager:
(United States) Ian Mork

Assistant referees:
Hermenerito Leal (Guatemala)
Graeme Browne (Saint Kitts and Nevis)
Fourth official:
Héctor Rodríguez (Honduras)

=== United States vs Costa Rica ===
July 16, 2013
20:00

United States	1–0	Costa Rica
Shea 82'	Report

Rentschler Field, East Hartford
Attendance: 25,432
Referee: Courtney Campbell (Jamaica)

United States	Costa Rica

GK	12	Sean Johnson
RB	15	Michael Parkhurst	(yellow card) 90+2'
CB	4	Michael Orozco
CB	21	Clarence Goodson
LB	7	DaMarcus Beasley (c)
RM	20	Alejandro Bedoya		(substituted off) 80'
CM	8	Mix Diskerud
CM	11	Stu Holden	(yellow card) 60'
LM	16	José Torres		(substituted off) 77'
CF	10	Landon Donovan
CF	19	Chris Wondolowski		(substituted off) 77'
Substitutions:
FW	9	Herculez Gomez		(substituted on) 77'
MF	23	Brek Shea		(substituted on) 77'
MF	6	Joe Corona		(substituted on) 80'
Manager:
(Germany) Jürgen Klinsmann

GK	18	Patrick Pemberton (c)	(yellow card) 55'
DF	4	Michael Umaña
DF	16	Carlos Johnson
DF	19	Roy Miller		(substituted off) 69'
DF	15	Junior Díaz
MF	3	Giancarlo González
MF	5	Celso Borges
MF	17	Yeltsin Tejeda
MF	20	Rodney Wallace		(substituted off) 72'
FW	8	Kenny Cunningham	(yellow card) 57'
FW	22	Jairo Arrieta	(yellow card) 76'	(substituted off) 78'
Substitutions:
DF	14	Christopher Meneses		(substituted on) 69'
MF	10	Osvaldo Rodríguez		(substituted on) 72'
FW	9	Álvaro Saborío		(substituted on) 78'
Manager:
(Colombia) Jorge Luis Pinto

Assistant referees:
Garnet Page (Jamaica)
Joe Fletcher (Canada)
Fourth official:
Elmer Bonilla (El Salvador)
