= Ian Mork =

American soccer player and coach

Personal information
- Full name: Ian Andrew Mork
- Date of birth: January 1, 1972 (age 54)
- Place of birth: Wichita, Kansas, United States

Youth career
- 1991: Johnson County Community College
- 1992–1994: Sangamon State University

Senior career*
Years	Team	Apps	(Gls)
1994–1995	Wichita Wings (indoor)	30	(10)
- Quick Boys
- San Pedro Dolphins

Managerial career
- 2006–2009: Ballistic United
- 2009: Belize
- 2012: Belize
- 2013–2014: Belize
- * Club domestic league appearances and goals

Ian Andrew Mork (born January 1, 1972), is an American soccer coach. He played professionally in the National Professional Soccer League.

== Playing career ==
Ian Mork was born on January 1, 1972, in Wichita, Kansas. In 1991, he played soccer for Johnson County Community College. He then transferred to Sangamon State University In 1994, Monk turned professional with the Wichita Wings in the National Professional Soccer League. Since then, he has played for Quick Boys, an amateur team in the Dutch Hoofdklasse and the San Pedro Dolphins in the Premier League of Belize. Mork has also played in the San Francisco Premier League and Marin Soccer League in northern California.

He was also the captain of the first team from Wichita (Wichita North - 1990) to win a state title in class 6A.

== Coaching career ==
Monk has been head coach of the Ballistic United soccer academy in California since 2006. In 2009, he became the head coach of the Belize national team. That year, Belize competed in the UNCAF Nations Cup, finishing at the bottom of Group A with one point after three games. Mork was also in charge of Belize during its 2010 FIFA World Cup qualification campaign and was appointed to lead Belize in the 2013 CONCACAF Gold Cup.

He holds a UEFA B-license.
