= Woodrow West =

Belizean footballer (born 1985)

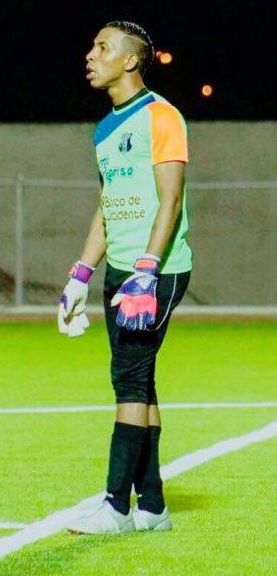
- West with Honduras Progreso in 2016

Personal information
- Full name: Woodrow Wilson West
- Date of birth: 19 September 1985 (age 41)
- Place of birth: Belmopan, Belize
- Height: 1.79 m (5 ft 10 in)
- Position: Goalkeeper

Team information
- Current team: Verdes FC

Senior career*
Years	Team	Apps	(Gls)
2004–2005	San Isidro Eagles		
2008	Atlético Chiriquí		
2008–2010	Revolutionary Conquerors		
2011–2012	Belize Defence Force		
2012–2015	Belmopan Bandits		
2015–2018	Honduras Progreso	72	
2018	Juticalpa	28	
2019–	Verdes		

International career^{‡}
2008–	Belize	46	(0)
- * Club domestic league appearances and goals ‡ National team caps and goals as of 12 June 2024

Woodrow Wilson West (born 19 September 1985) is a Belizean professional footballer who plays as a goalkeeper for Premier League of Belize club Verdes FC and the Belize national team. He has played in Honduras.

== Club career ==
In February 2008, West was signed by Panamanian side Atlético Chiriquí.

== International career ==
In July 2013, West and fellow Belizean international Ian Gaynair were praised by CONCACAF for reporting an attempt to bribe them ahead of a Gold Cup match against the United States.

He participated in qualifying matches for the 2014, 2018, 2022 and 2026 FIFA World Cup tournaments.

== Personal life ==
During a Verdes match against Progresso on 17 May 2023, West was detained by police for questioning regarding the murder of 19-year-old Imarie Galvez. He was later cleared as a suspect.

Married September 2024

2 sons- Khamari MS-Obeng, born 2020

Khilian West - born August 2026

== Career statistics ==
=== International ===
As of match played 12 June 2024

Appearances and goals by national team and year
National team	Year	Apps	Goals
Belize	2008	1	0
Belize	2009	2	0
Belize	2010	1	0
Belize	2011	4	0
Belize	2013	9	0
Belize	2014	2	0
Belize	2015	4	0
Belize	2016	1	0
Belize	2017	4	0
Belize	2018	5	0
Belize	2019	7	0
Belize	2021	2	0
Belize	2022	2	0
Belize	2024	2	0
Total		46	0

== Honours ==
Honduras Progreso

- Honduran Liga Nacional: 2015 Apertura

Verdes

- Premier League of Belize: 2022–23 Closing
