= 2013 CONCACAF Gold Cup =

12th edition of the CONCACAF Gold Cup

Tournament details
- Host country: United States
- Dates: July 7–28
- Teams: 12 (from 1 confederation)
- Venues: 13 (in 13 host cities)

Final positions
- Champions: United States (5th title)
- Runners-up: Panama

Tournament statistics
- Matches played: 25
- Goals scored: 67 (2.68 per match)
- Attendance: 907,208 (36,288 per match)
- Top scorer(s): (United States) Landon Donovan (Panama) Gabriel Torres (United States) Chris Wondolowski (5 goals each)
- Best player: (United States) Landon Donovan
- Best goalkeeper: (Panama) Jaime Penedo
- Fair play award: Panama

The 2013 CONCACAF Gold Cup was the 12th CONCACAF Gold Cup competition and the 22nd CONCACAF regional championship overall in CONCACAF's fifty years of existence. The United States was the host nation.

The competition began on July 7 at the Rose Bowl, and ended with the final on July 28, 2013, at Soldier Field, with the United States defeating Panama 1–0. In this edition, defending champions Mexico participated with an alternative squad due to the main players competing at the 2013 FIFA Confederations Cup prior to the Gold Cup. Despite this, they still reached the semi-finals, where they were eliminated by eventual runners-up Panama.

As winners of the 2013 tournament, the United States qualified for a play-off match against the champions of the 2015 Gold Cup, which ended up being Mexico, to decide which team would represent CONCACAF at the 2017 FIFA Confederations Cup in Russia. The play-off was a single match held on October 10, 2015, which Mexico won 3–2.

== Qualified teams ==
A total of 12 teams qualified for the tournament. Three berths were allocated to North America, five to Central America, and four to the Caribbean.

| Team | Qualification | Appearances | Last appearance | Previous best performance | FIFA Ranking |
North American zone
| United States | Automatic | 12th | 2011 | Champions (**1991**, **2002**, **2005**, **2007**) | 22 |
| Mexico (TH) | Automatic | 12th | 2011 | Champions (**1993**, 1996, 1998, **2003**, 2009, 2011) | 20 |
| Canada | Automatic | 11th | 2011 | Champions (2000) | 88 |
Caribbean zone qualified through the 2012 Caribbean Cup
| Cuba | Winners | 7th | 2011 | Quarterfinals (2003) | 82 |
| Trinidad and Tobago | Runners-up | 8th | 2007 | Semifinals (2000) | 87 |
| Haiti | Third Place | 5th | 2009 | Quarterfinals (2002, 2009) | 69 |
| Martinique | Fourth Place | 4th | 2003 | Quarterfinals (2002) | N/A |
Central American zone qualified through the 2013 Copa Centroamericana
| Costa Rica | Winners | 11th | 2011 | Runners-up (2002) | 39 |
| Honduras | Runners-up | 11th | 2011 | Runners-up (1991) | 55 |
| El Salvador | Third Place | 8th | 2011 | Quarterfinals (2002, 2003, 2011) | 94 |
| Belize | Fourth Place | 1st | None | Debut | 130 |
| Panama | Fifth Place | 6th | 2011 | Runners-up (2005) | 51 |

Bold indicates that the corresponding team was hosting the event.

== Venues ==
Thirty venues across the United States participated in the start of the stadium selection process with Soccer United Marketing, the event partner for the CONCACAF Gold Cup.

CONCACAF announced the thirteen host cities and venues for the tournament on January 23, 2013. Each venue hosted two matches, with the final being held at Chicago's Soldier Field.

| Pasadena | Arlington | Denver | Miami Gardens | Atlanta |
|---|---|---|---|---|
| Rose Bowl | Cowboys Stadium | Sports Authority Field at Mile High | Sun Life Stadium | Georgia Dome |
| Capacity: 92,542 | Capacity: 80,000 | Capacity: 76,125 | Capacity: 74,918 | Capacity: 71,228 |
| Baltimore | Location of the host cities of the 2013 CONCACAF Gold Cup. | | | Seattle |
| M&T Bank Stadium | Location of the host cities of the 2013 CONCACAF Gold Cup. | | | CenturyLink Field |
| Capacity: 71,008 | Location of the host cities of the 2013 CONCACAF Gold Cup. | | | Capacity: 67,000 |
| Chicago | Location of the host cities of the 2013 CONCACAF Gold Cup. | | | East Hartford |
| Soldier Field | Location of the host cities of the 2013 CONCACAF Gold Cup. | | | Rentschler Field |
| Capacity: 61,500 | Location of the host cities of the 2013 CONCACAF Gold Cup. | | | Capacity: 40,000 |
| Harrison | Houston | Portland | Sandy | |
| Red Bull Arena | BBVA Compass Stadium | Jeld-Wen Field | Rio Tinto Stadium | |
| Capacity: 25,189 | Capacity: 22,039 | Capacity: 20,438 | Capacity: 20,213 | |

== Squads ==
Each team could register a squad of 23 players, three of whom had to be goalkeepers. Any team that qualified for the knockout stage could replace up to four players in the squad after completion of the group stage, where the new players had to come from a provisional list of 35 players chosen before the tournament.

== Match officials ==
Each CONCACAF federation submitted a list of match officials to the CONCACAF referee's commission for the 2013 tournament.

Referees

- (Canada) David Gantar
- (Costa Rica) Jeffrey Solis Calderón
- (Costa Rica) Hugo Cruz Alvarado
- (Costa Rica) Wálter Quesada
- (Cuba) Marcos Brea
- (El Salvador) Joel Aguilar
- (El Salvador) Elmer Bonilla
- (Honduras) Armando Castro
- (Honduras) Héctor Rodríguez
- (Jamaica) Courtney Campbell
- (Mexico) Marco Rodríguez
- (Puerto Rico) Javier Santos
- (Suriname) Enrico Wijngaarde
- (United States) Mark Geiger
- (United States) Jair Marrufo

Assistant referees

- (Canada) Philippe Brière
- (Canada) Joe Fletcher
- (Costa Rica) Octavio Jara
- (El Salvador) William Torres Mejía
- (El Salvador) Juan Zumba
- (Guatemala) Hermenerito Leal
- (Honduras) Christian Ramírez
- (Jamaica) Ricardo Morgan
- (Jamaica) Garnet Page
- (Mexico) Marcos Quintero
- (Mexico) Marvin Torrentera
- (Saint Kitts and Nevis) Graeme Browne
- (Suriname) Ramon Ricardo Louisville
- (United States) Eric Boria
- (United States) Sean Hurd

== Group stage ==
CONCACAF announced the groups, where the twelve teams were divided into three groups of four teams, and the match schedule for the 2013 Gold Cup on March 13, 2013.

In the group stage, if two or more teams were equal on points (including among third-placed teams in different groups), the ranking of teams was determined as follows:

1. Greater goal difference in all group matches
2. Greater number of goals scored in all group matches
3. Greatest number of points obtained in group matches between the teams concerned (applicable only to ranking in each group)
4. Drawing of lots by the Gold Cup Organizing Committee

This was changed from previous tournaments, where head-to-head record was used as the primary tiebreaker.

Key to colors in group tables
| Teams that advanced to the quarter-finals: Group winners; Group runners-up; Best two third-placed teams among all groups |

All times are US Eastern Daylight Time (UTC−4).

=== Group A ===
| Pos | Team | Pld | W | D | L | GF | GA | GD | Pts | Qualification |
|---|---|---|---|---|---|---|---|---|---|---|
| 1 | Panama | 3 | 2 | 1 | 0 | 3 | 1 | +2 | 7 | Advance to knockout stage |
| 2 | Mexico | 3 | 2 | 0 | 1 | 6 | 3 | +3 | 6 | Advance to knockout stage |
| 3 | Martinique | 3 | 1 | 0 | 2 | 2 | 4 | −2 | 3 | |
| 4 | Canada | 3 | 0 | 1 | 2 | 0 | 3 | −3 | 1 | |

July 7, 2013
17:30

| Canada | 0–1 | Martinique |
|---|---|---|
| | Report | Reuperné 90+3' |

Rose Bowl, Pasadena
Attendance: 56,822
Referee: Marcos Brea (Cuba)
July 7, 2013
20:00

| Mexico | 1–2 | Panama |
|---|---|---|
| Fabián 45+2' | Report | G. Torres 7' (pen.), 48' |

Rose Bowl, Pasadena
Attendance: 56,822
Referee: Wálter Quesada (Costa Rica)

July 11, 2013
20:30

| Panama | 1–0 | Martinique |
|---|---|---|
| G. Torres 85' (pen.) | Report |

CenturyLink Field, Seattle
Attendance: 28,354
Referee: Armando Castro (Honduras)
July 11, 2013
23:00

| Mexico | 2–0 | Canada |
|---|---|---|
| R. Jiménez 42'; Fabián 57' (pen.) | Report |

CenturyLink Field, Seattle
Attendance: 28,354
Referee: Joel Aguilar (El Salvador)

July 14, 2013
15:30

| Panama | 0–0 | Canada |
|---|---|---|
| | Report |

Sports Authority Field, Denver
Attendance: 30,000
Referee: Wálter Quesada (Costa Rica)
July 14, 2013
18:00

| Martinique | 1–3 | Mexico |
|---|---|---|
| Parsemain 43' (pen.) | Report | Fabián 21'; Montes 34'; Ponce 90' |

Sports Authority Field, Denver
Attendance: 30,000
Referee: Mark Geiger (United States)

=== Group B ===
| Pos | Team | Pld | W | D | L | GF | GA | GD | Pts | Qualification |
|---|---|---|---|---|---|---|---|---|---|---|
| 1 | Honduras | 3 | 2 | 0 | 1 | 3 | 2 | +1 | 6 | Advance to knockout stage |
| 2 | Trinidad and Tobago | 3 | 1 | 1 | 1 | 4 | 4 | 0 | 4 | Advance to knockout stage |
| 3 | El Salvador | 3 | 1 | 1 | 1 | 3 | 3 | 0 | 4 | Advance to knockout stage |
| 4 | Haiti | 3 | 1 | 0 | 2 | 2 | 3 | −1 | 3 | |

July 8, 2013
19:00

| El Salvador | 2–2 | Trinidad and Tobago |
|---|---|---|
| Zelaya 22', 69' | Report | Daniel 11'; K. Jones 73' |

Red Bull Arena, Harrison
Attendance: 20,000
Referee: Marco Rodríguez (Mexico)
July 8, 2013
21:30

| Haiti | 0–2 | Honduras |
|---|---|---|
| | Report | R. Martínez 4'; M. Chávez 78' |

Red Bull Arena, Harrison
Attendance: 20,000
Referee: Hugo Cruz Alvarado (Costa Rica)

July 12, 2013
19:00

| Trinidad and Tobago | 0–2 | Haiti |
|---|---|---|
| | Report | Maurice 16', 53' |

Sun Life Stadium, Miami Gardens
Attendance: 28,713
Referee: Jeffrey Solis Calderón (Costa Rica)
July 12, 2013
21:30

| Honduras | 1–0 | El Salvador |
|---|---|---|
| Claros 90+2' | Report |

Sun Life Stadium, Miami Gardens
Attendance: 28,713
Referee: Jair Marrufo (United States)

July 15, 2013
19:00

| El Salvador | 1–0 | Haiti |
|---|---|---|
| Zelaya 76' | Report |

BBVA Compass Stadium, Houston
Attendance: 21,783
Referee: Javier Santos (Puerto Rico)
July 15, 2013
21:30

| Honduras | 0–2 | Trinidad and Tobago |
|---|---|---|
| | Report | K. Jones 48' (pen.); Molino 67' |

BBVA Compass Stadium, Houston
Attendance: 21,783
Referee: Marco Rodríguez (Mexico)

=== Group C ===
| Pos | Team | Pld | W | D | L | GF | GA | GD | Pts | Qualification |
|---|---|---|---|---|---|---|---|---|---|---|
| 1 | United States | 3 | 3 | 0 | 0 | 11 | 2 | +9 | 9 | Advance to knockout stage |
| 2 | Costa Rica | 3 | 2 | 0 | 1 | 4 | 1 | +3 | 6 | Advance to knockout stage |
| 3 | Cuba | 3 | 1 | 0 | 2 | 5 | 7 | −2 | 3 | Advance to knockout stage |
| 4 | Belize | 3 | 0 | 0 | 3 | 1 | 11 | −10 | 0 | |

July 9, 2013
20:30

| Costa Rica | 3–0 | Cuba |
|---|---|---|
| Barrantes 52', 77'; Arrieta 71' | Report |

Jeld-Wen Field, Portland
Attendance: 18,724
Referee: Elmer Bonilla (El Salvador)
July 9, 2013
23:00

| Belize | 1–6 | United States |
|---|---|---|
| Gaynair 40' | Report | Wondolowski 12', 37', 41'; Holden 58'; Orozco 72'; Donovan 76' (pen.) |

Jeld-Wen Field, Portland
Attendance: 18,724
Referee: Héctor Rodríguez (Honduras)

July 13, 2013
15:30

| United States | 4–1 | Cuba |
|---|---|---|
| Donovan 45+2' (pen.); Corona 57'; Wondolowski 66', 85' | Report | Alfonso 36' |

Rio Tinto Stadium, Sandy
Attendance: 17,597
Referee: David Gantar (Canada)
July 13, 2013
18:00

| Costa Rica | 1–0 | Belize |
|---|---|---|
| Eiley 49' (o.g.) | Report |

Rio Tinto Stadium, Sandy
Attendance: 17,597
Referee: Enrico Wijngaarde (Suriname)

July 16, 2013
17:30

| Cuba | 4–0 | Belize |
|---|---|---|
| Martínez 38', 62', 84'; Márquez 90+3' | Report |

Rentschler Field, East Hartford
Attendance: 25,432
Referee: Enrico Wijngaarde (Suriname)
July 16, 2013
20:00

| United States | 1–0 | Costa Rica |
|---|---|---|
| Shea 82' | Report |

Rentschler Field, East Hartford
Attendance: 25,432
Referee: Courtney Campbell (Jamaica)

=== Ranking of third-placed teams ===
| Pos | Grp | Team | Pld | W | D | L | GF | GA | GD | Pts | Qualification |
|---|---|---|---|---|---|---|---|---|---|---|---|
| 1 | B | El Salvador | 3 | 1 | 1 | 1 | 3 | 3 | 0 | 4 | Advance to knockout stage |
| 2 | C | Cuba | 3 | 1 | 0 | 2 | 5 | 7 | −2 | 3 | Advance to knockout stage |
| 3 | A | Martinique | 3 | 1 | 0 | 2 | 2 | 4 | −2 | 3 | |

== Knockout stage ==
In the knockout stage, if a match was level at the end of normal playing time, extra time was played (two periods of 15 minutes each) and followed, if necessary, by a penalty shoot-out to determine the winners.

=== Bracket ===
Quarter-finals
July 20 – Atlanta
Mexico | 1
Trinidad and Tobago | 0
July 20 – Atlanta
Panama | 6
Cuba | 1
July 21 – Baltimore
Honduras | 1
Costa Rica | 0
July 21 – Baltimore
United States | 5
El Salvador | 1

Semi-finals
July 24 – Arlington
Mexico | 1
Panama | 2
July 24 – Arlington
Honduras | 1
United States | 3

Final
July 28 – Chicago
Panama | 0
United States | 1

=== Quarter-finals ===
July 20, 2013
15:30

| Panama | 6–1 | Cuba |
|---|---|---|
| G. Torres 25' (pen.), 37'; C. Rodríguez 68'; B. Pérez 78', 88'; Jiménez 85' | Report | Alfonso 21' |

Georgia Dome, Atlanta
Attendance: 54,229
Referee: Mark Geiger (United States)

July 20, 2013
18:30

| Mexico | 1–0 | Trinidad and Tobago |
|---|---|---|
| R. Jiménez 84' | Report |

Georgia Dome, Atlanta
Attendance: 54,229
Referee: Joel Aguilar (El Salvador)

July 21, 2013
16:00

| United States | 5–1 | El Salvador |
|---|---|---|
| Goodson 21'; Corona 29'; E. Johnson 60'; Donovan 78'; Diskerud 84' | Report | Zelaya 39' (pen.) |

M&T Bank Stadium, Baltimore
Attendance: 70,540
Referee: Enrico Wijngaarde (Suriname)

July 21, 2013
19:00

| Honduras | 1–0 | Costa Rica |
|---|---|---|
| Najar 49' | Report |

M&T Bank Stadium, Baltimore
Attendance: 70,540
Referee: Courtney Campbell (Jamaica)

=== Semi-finals ===
July 24, 2013
19:00

| United States | 3–1 | Honduras |
|---|---|---|
| E. Johnson 11'; Donovan 27', 53' | Report | Medina 52' |

Cowboys Stadium, Arlington
Attendance: 81,410
Referee: Wálter Quesada (Costa Rica)

July 24, 2013
22:00

| Panama | 2–1 | Mexico |
|---|---|---|
| B. Pérez 13'; R. Torres 61' | Report | Montes 26' |

Cowboys Stadium, Arlington
Attendance: 81,410
Referee: Courtney Campbell (Jamaica)

=== Final ===
July 28, 2013
16:00

| United States | 1–0 | Panama |
|---|---|---|
| Shea 69' | Report |

Soldier Field, Chicago
Attendance: 57,920
Referee: Joel Aguilar (El Salvador)

== Statistics ==
=== Goalscorers ===
There were 67 goals scored in 25 matches, for an average of 2.68 goals per match.

5 goals

- (Panama) Gabriel Torres
- (United States) Landon Donovan
- (United States) Chris Wondolowski

4 goals

- (El Salvador) Rodolfo Zelaya

3 goals

- (Cuba) Ariel Martínez
- (Mexico) Marco Fabián
- (Panama) Blas Pérez

2 goals

- (Costa Rica) Michael Barrantes
- (Cuba) José Ciprian Alfonso
- (Haiti) Jean-Eudes Maurice
- (Mexico) Raúl Jiménez
- (Mexico) Luis Montes
- (Trinidad and Tobago) Kenwyne Jones
- (United States) Joe Corona
- (United States) Eddie Johnson
- (United States) Brek Shea

1 goal

- (Belize) Ian Gaynair
- (Costa Rica) Jairo Arrieta
- (Cuba) Yénier Márquez
- (Honduras) Marvin Chávez
- (Honduras) Jorge Claros
- (Honduras) Rony Martínez
- (Honduras) Nery Medina
- (Honduras) Andy Najar
- (Martinique) Kévin Parsemain
- (Martinique) Fabrice Reuperné
- (Mexico) Miguel Ángel Ponce
- (Panama) Jairo Jiménez
- (Panama) Carlos Rodríguez
- (Panama) Román Torres
- (Trinidad and Tobago) Keon Daniel
- (Trinidad and Tobago) Kevin Molino
- (United States) Mikkel Diskerud
- (United States) Clarence Goodson
- (United States) Stu Holden
- (United States) Michael Orozco

1 own goal

- (Belize) Dalton Eiley (against Costa Rica)

=== Awards ===
| State Farm Fair Play Award | Sprint Golden Glove | Santander Golden Boot^{1} | Miller Lite Golden Ball |
|---|---|---|---|
| Panama | (Panama) Jaime Penedo | (Panama) Gabriel Torres (United States) Chris Wondolowski (United States) Landon Donovan | (United States) Landon Donovan |

Notes

^{1} Award was shared between the three players.

=== Team of the Tournament ===
The following team was selected as the Team of the Tournament by Eat. Sleep. Soccer.:

| Goalkeeper | Defenders | Midfielders | Forwards |
|---|---|---|---|
| (Panama) Jaime Penedo | (United States) DaMarcus Beasley (Panama) Román Torres (Honduras) Víctor Bernárdez (United States) Michael Orozco | (United States) Landon Donovan (United States) Mix Diskerud (Panama) Alberto Quintero (Mexico) Marco Fabián | (Panama) Gabriel Torres (United States) Chris Wondolowski |

== Official song ==
"Cups" by actress Anna Kendrick (from the film Pitch Perfect) was the official song of the tournament.

== Marketing ==
In December 2012, Traffic Sports USA were awarded the rights to manage the marketing of the tournament, which continued a relationship between CONCACAF and the parent company Traffic Sports Marketing. In 2015, this business deal led to charges in the 2015 FIFA corruption case, which identified bribes given from top Traffic officials to CONCACAF chairman, Jeffrey Webb.

== Game notes ==
- On July 7, 2013 – A Guinness world record 566 mariachis performed at the half-time of the first-round game between Mexico and Panama at the Rose Bowl, Pasadena, California.
