= José Ciprian Alfonso =

Cuban footballer

José Ciprián Alfonso
Personal information
- Full name: José Ciprián Alfonso Pita
- Date of birth: 28 March 1984 (age 42)
- Place of birth: Los Palacios, Cuba
- Height: 1.75 m (5 ft 9 in)
- Position: Forward

Team information
- Current team: Pinar del Río

Senior career*
Years	Team	Apps	(Gls)
2003–2014	Pinar del Río		(32+)
2015	La Habana		
2016	Isla de La Juventud	2	(0)
2017	Santiago de Cuba	5	(0)
2018–2019	Pinar del Río		
2019	Artemisa		(1)
2019–	Pinar del Río		

International career
2013–2014	Cuba	11	(2)
- * Club domestic league appearances and goals as of 17 May 2020

José Ciprián Alfonso Pita (born 28 March 1984) is a Cuban international footballer who plays as a forward for Cuban club Pinar del Río.

== Club career ==
Born in Los Palacios, Pinar del Río Province, Alfonso played the majority of his career for local team Pinar del Río.

== International ==
He made his debut for Cuba in a 2013 CONCACAF Gold Cup match against Costa Rica. He scored his first international goal against the United States in his second international appearance.

His final international match was a November 2014 Caribbean Cup match against Haiti.

=== International goals ===
As of 13 July 2013

Scores and results list Cuba's goal tally first.

No	Date	Venue	Opponent	Score	Result	Competition
1.	13 July 2013	Rio Tinto Stadium, Sandy, USA	United States	1–0	1–4	2013 CONCACAF Gold Cup
2.	20 July 2013	Georgia Dome, Atlanta, USA	Panama	1–0	1–6	2013 CONCACAF Gold Cup
