= Michael Orozco =

American soccer player)

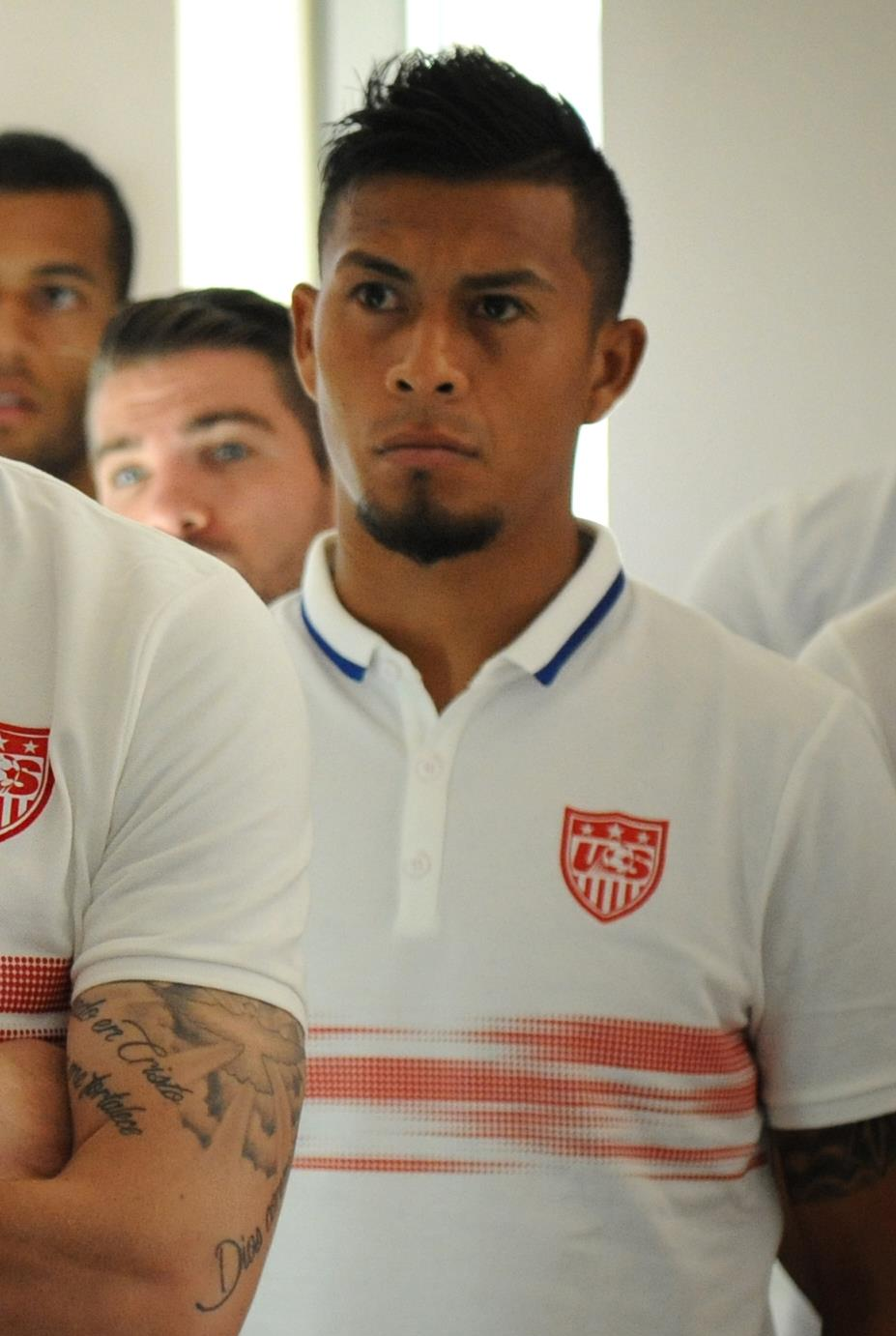
- Orozco in 2015

Personal information
- Full name: Michael Orozco Fiscal
- Date of birth: February 7, 1986 (age 40)
- Place of birth: Orange, California, U.S.
- Height: 5 ft 11 in (1.80 m)
- Position: Center-back

Youth career
- 2001–2005: Irvine Strikers
- 2005–2006: San Luis

Senior career*
Years	Team	Apps	(Gls)
2006–2013	San Luis	106	(4)
2010	→ Philadelphia Union (loan)	29	(2)
2013	→ Puebla (loan)	15	(0)
2013–2015	Chiapas	0	(0)
2013–2015	→ Puebla (loan)	57	(1)
2015–2019	Tijuana	55	(0)
2018–2019	→ BUAP (loan)	29	(1)
2019–2022	Orange County SC	94	(4)

International career^{‡}
2008	United States U23	7	(0)
2008–2016	United States	29	(4)
Medal record
Men's soccer
Representing United States
CONCACAF Gold Cup
Winner	2013 United States
CONCACAF Cup
Runner-up	2015 United States
- * Club domestic league appearances and goals as of October 22, 2022 ‡ National team caps and goals as of October 27, 2019

Michael Orozco Fiscal (born February 7, 1986) is an American retired professional soccer player who played as a center-back.

== Early life ==
Orozco grew up in Anaheim, California. His parents are originally from Mexico, and Michael joined the youth program of Mexican Primera A team San Luis in 2002.

== Career ==
=== Professional ===
Michael Orozco made his professional debut for San Luis during the Apertura 2006 tournament, when he entered as a second-half substitute against Tigres UANL, but was sent off after just two minutes. He played in 106 league matches for the club until its move to Chiapas.

In January 2010, Orozco left San Luis to join MLS side Philadelphia Union on loan. After one season, Philadelphia decided not to exercise its purchase option on Orozco and he returned to San Luis.

Orozco was loaned to Puebla for the 2013 Clausura. The move was extended the following summer.

Orozco scored the first goal of his Puebla career in a 2–1 loss to Cruz Azul.

=== International ===
Orozco was called into numerous United States under-23 camps in preparation for the 2008 CONCACAF Men's Olympic Qualifying Tournament. He helped the team qualify for the 2008 Summer Olympics with stellar performances on defense. He was included in the Best XI of the 2008 CONCACAF Men's U23 Championship All-Tournament Team.

On July 17, 2008, Orozco was named to the United States team for the 2008 Olympics in Beijing. Orozco started all three matches for the United States.

On August 13, 2008, Orozco received a red card in the third minute of the United States's 2–1 loss to Nigeria in the final group stage match of the 2008 Olympics for throwing an intentional elbow to the chest of Solomon Okoronkwo. The loss subsequently caused the United States to fail to advance from the group stage.

On August 28, 2008, Orozco was called up to his first full national team camp in preparation for 2010 World Cup qualifying matches against Cuba and Trinidad and Tobago.

On October 15, 2008, he debuted in the latter match, playing the full 90 minutes in a 2–1 loss.

On August 10, 2011, he returned to the starting lineup in a friendly against Mexico, a 1–1 draw. The match was the United States's first under newly appointed head coach Jürgen Klinsmann.

On August 15, 2012, Orozco featured again against Mexico, scoring the lone goal in a 1–0 win for the United States, its first-ever away win over Mexico. The United States's all-time record in Mexico improved to 1–1–23, and Mexico suffered only its ninth loss in 120 matches at Estadio Azteca.

== Career statistics ==
=== Club ===
As of April 25, 2012

Club performance			League		National cup		League cup		Continental		Total	
Season	Club	League	Apps	Goals	Apps	Goals	Apps	Goals	Apps	Goals	Apps	Goals
Mexico			League		Cup		League Cup		North America		Total	
2006–07	San Luis	Primera División	10	0	-	-	-	-	-	-	10	0
2007–08	San Luis	Primera División	27	0	-	-	-	-	-	-	27	0
2008–09	San Luis	Primera División	21	1	-	-	3	0	-	-	24	1
2009–10	San Luis	Primera División	13	2	-	-	-	-	-	-	13	2
U.S.			League		Open Cup		League Cup		North America		Total	
2010	Philadelphia Union (loan)	Major League Soccer	29	2	1	0	-	-	-	-	30	2
Mexico			League		Cup		League Cup		North America		Total	
2011–12	San Luis	Primera División	26	0	-	-	1	0	-	-	26	0
2012–13	San Luis	Liga MX	10	1	4	0	-	-	-	-	14	1
2012–13	Puebla (loan)	Liga MX	13	0	2	0	-	-	-	-	15	0
Total	Mexico		120	4	6	0	1	0	0	0	127	4
Total	U.S.		29	2	1	0	0	0	0	0	30	2
Career total			149	6	7	0	1	0	0	0	157	6

=== International ===
As of November 11, 2016

National team	Year	Apps	Goals
United States	2008	1	0
United States	2011	3	0
United States	2012	1	1
United States	2013	6	2
United States	2014	2	0
United States	2015	7	0
United States	2016	9	1
Total		29	4

== International goals ==
Scores and results list United States goal tally first.

#	Date	Venue	Opponent	Score	Result	Competition
1.	August 15, 2012	Estadio Azteca, Mexico City, Mexico	Mexico	1–0	1–0	Friendly
2.	July 9, 2013	Jeld-Wen Field, Portland, United States	Belize	5–1	6–1	2013 CONCACAF Gold Cup
3.	October 15, 2013	Estadio Rommel Fernández, Panama City, Panama	Panama	1–1	3–2	2014 FIFA World Cup qualification – CONCACAF fourth round
4.	January 31, 2016	StubHub Center, Carson, California	Iceland	2–2	3–2	Friendly

== Honors ==
United States

- CONCACAF Gold Cup: 2013
