= Yénier Márquez =

Cuban footballer (born 1979)

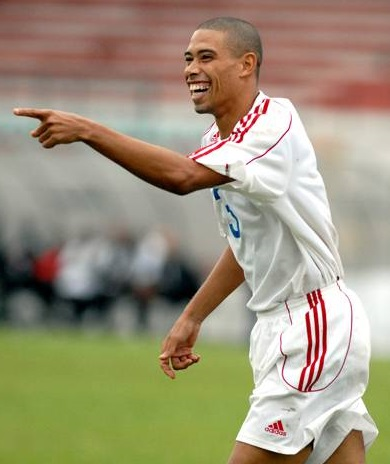
- Márquez in 2010

Personal information
- Full name: Yénier Márquez Molina
- Date of birth: 3 January 1979 (age 47)
- Place of birth: Corralillo, Cuba
- Height: 1.90 m (6 ft 3 in)
- Position: Defender

Senior career*
Years	Team	Apps	(Gls)
1999–2015	FC Villa Clara		
2015–2018	Green Bay Hoppers		
2018–2019	FC Villa Clara		

International career
2000–2015	Cuba	126	(16)
- * Club domestic league appearances and goals

Yénier Márquez Molina (born 3 January 1979) is a Cuban former footballer who played as a defender.

He is the Cuba national team's most capped player of all-time.

== Club career ==
Born in Corralillo, Márquez he his senior debut with FC Villa Clara in 1999. In 2013, Marquez was the Cuban league's top goalscorer with 16 and in 2014 he was voted Cuban footballer of the year.

He played for Antiguan side Green Bay Hoppers.

== International career ==
Nicknamed El Croqui, he made his international debut for Cuba in a May 2000 FIFA World Cup qualification against Barbados, and has earned a total of 126 caps, scoring 16 goals. He represented his country in 19 FIFA World Cup qualifying matches. He played in five FIFA World Cup qualification campaigns and at eight CONCACAF Gold Cups.

His final international was a July 2015 CONCACAF Gold Cup match against Guatemala.

== Personal life ==
Since football players are not allowed to play professionally in Cuba, Márquez also had a job as motorcycle taxi driver.

== Career statistics ==
Scores and results list Cuba's goal tally first, score column indicates score after each Márquez goal.

List of international goals scored by Yénier Márquez
No.	Date	Venue	Opponent	Score	Result	Competition
1	4 April 2001	Uitvlugt Community Centre Ground, Uitvlugt, Guyana	Dominica		3–1	Shell Caribbean Cup
2	6 April 2001	Uitvlugt Community Centre Ground, Uitvlugt, Guyana	Saint Martin		1–0	Shell Caribbean Cup
3	6 July 2003	Independence Park, Kingston, Jamaica	Jamaica		2–1	Friendly
4	16 January 2005	Estadio Pedro Marrero, Havana, Cuba	Haiti		1–1	Gold Cup Qualifier
5	8 November 2006	Stade d'Honneur de Dillon, Fort-de-France, Martinique	Haiti		1–2	2007 Caribbean Cup
6	22 June 2008	Estadio Pedro Marrero, Havana, Cuba	Antigua and Barbuda		4–0	2010 World Cup qualification
7	20 August 2008	Estadio Pedro Marrero, Havana, Cuba	Trinidad and Tobago		1–3	2010 World Cup qualification
8	23 October 2008	Estadio Pedro Marrero, Havana, Cuba	Netherlands Antilles		3–1	2008 Caribbean Cup qualification
9	27 October 2008	Estadio Pedro Marrero, Havana, Cuba	Suriname		3–1	2008 Caribbean Cup qualification
10	8 December 2008	Greenfield Stadium, Trelawny, Jamaica	Antigua and Barbuda		3–0	Digicel Caribbean Cup
11	26 October 2010	Ciudad de Panamá	Panama		3–0	Friendly
12	28 November 2010	Stade Pierre-Aliker, Fort-de-France, Martinique	Martinique		2–0	2010 Caribbean Cup
13	12 June 2011	Soldier Field, Chicago, United States	El Salvador		1-6	2011 CONCACAF Gold Cup
14	16 July 2013	Rentschler Field, East Hartford, United States	Belize		4–0	2013 CONCACAF Gold Cup
15	25 March 2015	Estadio Cibao, Santiago de los Caballeros, Dominican Republic	Dominican Republic		3–0	Friendly
16	14 June 2015	Estadio Pedro Marrero, Havana, Cuba	Curaçao		1–1	2018 World Cup qualification

== See also ==
- List of men's footballers with 100 or more international caps
