= Ian Gaynair =

Belizean footballer (born 1986)

Personal information
- Date of birth: 26 February 1986 (age 40)
- Place of birth: Belize City, Belize
- Position: Defender

Senior career*
Years	Team	Apps	(Gls)
2019-	Belmopan Bandits	?	(?)

International career
2010-	Belize	56	(2)
- * Club domestic league appearances and goals

Ian Gaynair (born February 26, 1986) is a Belizean professional defender currently playing for Belmopan Bandits.

In July 2013 he, and fellow international Woodrow West, were praised by CONCACAF for reporting an attempt to bribe them ahead of a Gold Cup game against the USA.

Gaynair's goal against the US was Belize's only score of the tournament; it was also his first international goal.

== International goals ==
Scores and results list Belize's goal tally first.

No.	Date	Venue	Opponent	Score	Result	Competition
1.	9 July 2013	Providence Park, Portland, United States	United States	1–2	1–6	2013 CONCACAF Gold Cup
2.	17 November 2019	Kirani James Athletic Stadium, St. George's, Grenada	Grenada	1–1	2–3	2019–20 CONCACAF Nations League C
