= Enrico Wijngaarde =

Surinamese football referee

Enrico Wijngaarde (born 11 January 1974) is a Surinamese football referee who currently resides in Paramaribo. He has been a full international referee for FIFA since 2002.

He was selected as a referee for the 2007 FIFA U-20 World Cup in Canada, where he refereed two matches.
