= 2013 CONCACAF Gold Cup final =

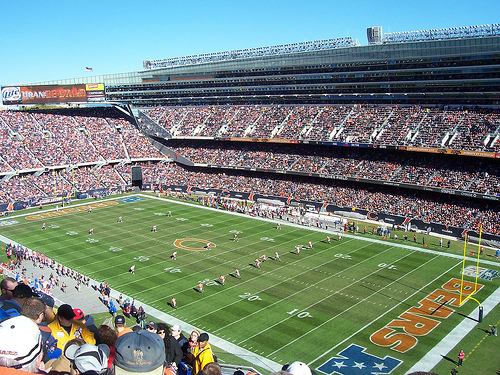
- Event: 2013 CONCACAF Gold Cup
United States	Panama
(United States)	(Panama)
1	0
- Date: July 28, 2013
- Venue: Soldier Field, Chicago
- Referee: Joel Aguilar (El Salvador)
- Attendance: 57,920
- Weather: Partly cloudy, 79 °F (26 °C)

The 2013 CONCACAF Gold Cup final was the 12th final of the CONCACAF Gold Cup, the international championship tournament for CONCACAF, the governing body of soccer in North and Central America. The match took place on July 28, 2013, at Soldier Field in Chicago, Illinois, United States. The final was between the United States and Panama.

The match was a rematch of the 2005 Gold Cup final. This was also the first time since 2005 that the Gold Cup final did not feature Mexico.

With the win, the United States advanced to the one-game playoff played on October 10, 2015, against the champion of the 2015 CONCACAF Gold Cup, which turned out to be Mexico. The winner of the play-off would qualify to represent CONCACAF in the 2017 FIFA Confederations Cup in Russia.

== Route to the final ==
United States		Round	Panama	
Opponent	Result	Group stage	Opponent	Result
Belize	6–1	Match 1	Mexico	2–1
Cuba	4–1	Match 2	Martinique	1–0
Costa Rica	1–0	Match 3	Canada	0–0
Group C winners: Pos / Team / Pld / Pts; 1 / United States / 3 / 9; 2 / Costa Rica / 3 / 6; 3 / Cuba / 3 / 3; 4 / Belize / 3 / 0; Source:		Final standings	Group A winners: Pos / Team / Pld / Pts; 1 / Panama / 3 / 7; 2 / Mexico / 3 / 6; 3 / Martinique / 3 / 3; 4 / Canada / 3 / 1; Source:	
Opponent	Result	Knockout stage	Opponent	Result
El Salvador	5–1	Quarterfinals	Cuba	6–1
Honduras	3–1	Semifinals	Mexico	2–1

=== United States ===
The host started well in the tournament, trashing debutant Belize with 6–1. Three goals came from striker Chris Wondolowski in the first half. In the second game, the U.S. fell behind after José Ciprian Alfonso converted a cross from Ariel Martínez. After left-back Edgar Castillo was tripped by Yénier Márquez in the injury time of the second half, Donovan scored from the penalty spot to make it 1–1. Joe Corona gave the U.S. the lead with a shot from just outside the box in the 57th minute and Wondolowski, coming on as a substitute, added two more goals, making the final score 4–1. In the final group game, the U.S. faced Costa Rica in order to determine the group winner. Substitute Brek Shea scored the only goal of in the match in the 82nd minute.

In the quarterfinal, the U.S. faced El Salvador who had qualified as one of the two best third-placed teams. Defender Clarence Goodson gave the hosts the lead in the 21st minute. Goalkeeper Nick Rimando made two fine saves against Léster Blanco and Richard Menjivar before Joe Corona scored a second goal for the United States. Rodolfo Zelaya converted a penalty after he was fouled by U.S. Captain DaMarcus Beasley in the 39th minute, making it 2–1 at half-time. Only seconds after coming in, Eddie Johnson headed in a corner by Landon Donovan in the 60th minute. Donovan and Mix Diskerud added two more goals, giving the U.S. a clear 5–1 win.

In the semifinal, the hosts had to defeat Honduras in order to advance to the Chicago final. Eddie Johnson scored an early goal and Donovan doubled the lead in the 27th minute. In the second half, a header by Nery Medina brought hope for Honduras, but once again Donovan netted in to make it 3–1. It was the final goal of the game. Late in the Honduras match, U.S. manager Jürgen Klinsmann was sent off for arguing a foul on DaMarcus Beasley, which, by rule, meant a one-match suspension. Attempts to appeal by the U.S. Soccer Federation were unsuccessful; the U.S. was forced to replace Klinsmann with assistant Andreas Herzog and scout Martin Vasquez.

=== Panama ===
Panama surprised at the opening game by beating reigning champions Mexico. Gabriel Torres converted a penalty to make it 1–0 in the 7th minute after Raúl Jiménez brought down Alberto Quintero inside the penalty box. Mexico equalized through Marco Fabián seconds before halftime. Gabriel Torres scored the winning in the 48th minute after a cross from Alberto Quintero. In the second match against Martinique, Panama had to wait long for the lead. When Martinique was down to ten men due to the dismissal of Jacky Berdix, substitute Jairo Jiménez was fouled by Sébastien Crétinoir inside the penalty box. Again Gabriel Torres scored the winning goal by converting the penalty in the 85th minute. In the final group game, a nearly complete different team played out a goalless draw against Canada. The result was enough to see Panama through as winner of Group A.

In the quarterfinal, Panama played against Cuba, who had trashed Belize 4–0 to make it through as one of the two best third-ranked teams. Panama initially fell behind when José Ciprian Alfonso converted a chip pass by Jaime Colomé in the 21st minute. However, when Cuban defender Renay Malblanche blocked a shot from Marcos Sánchez with his hand inside the penalty box, referee Mark Geiger gave Panama a penalty kick. Once again Gabriel Torres stepped up and made it 1–1 only four minutes after the Cuban goal. In the 37th minute, Torres scored another goal, this time after a headed pass by his co-striker Blas Pérez. In the second half, Cuba was decimated after Ariel Martínez was sent off after a high challenge on Blas Pérez. Panama went on to score four more times, making the final result 6–1.

In the semifinal, the Canaleros once again faced title defender Mexico. Panama took an early lead through a goal from Blas Pérez in the 13th minute, but Luis Montes equalized for El Tri midway through the first half. In the 61st minute, Panama skipper Román Torres headed in a corner by Gabriel Torres, once again giving his team the lead. This time, it lasted till the final whistle, despite several good opportunities for the Mexicans.

== Match ==
=== Summary ===
Before the match, suspended U.S. manager Jürgen Klinsmann was escorted to a suite inside Soldier Field to watch the match. During some cuts in between stoppages on Fox, Klinsmann could be visibly seen reacting to every missed chance by the U.S. In the 19th minute, Stu Holden suffered a sprained knee on a collision with Alberto Quintero and was substituted by Mix Diskerud. The only goal of the game came from Brek Shea in the 69th minute when he touched into an open net from inches out with his left foot after a cross from the right by Alejandro Bedoya had passed Panama's goalkeeper Jaime Penedo. Shea scored after only entering the game as a substitute for Joe Corona 42 seconds earlier. The win gave the United States its fifth Gold Cup championship.

July 28, 2013
16:00

United States	1–0	Panama
Shea 69'	Report

Soldier Field, Chicago
Attendance: 57,920
Referee: Joel Aguilar (El Salvador)

United States	Panama

GK	1	Nick Rimando
RB	15	Michael Parkhurst
CB	25	Matt Besler
CB	21	Clarence Goodson
LB	7	DaMarcus Beasley (c)
CM	14	Kyle Beckerman
CM	11	Stu Holden		(substituted off) 23'
AM	20	Alejandro Bedoya	(yellow card) 63'	(substituted off) 89'
AM	6	Joe Corona		(substituted off) 68'
CF	10	Landon Donovan
CF	26	Eddie Johnson	(yellow card) 90'
Substitutions:
MF	8	Mix Diskerud		(substituted on) 23'
MF	23	Brek Shea	(yellow card) 90+4'	(substituted on) 68'
DF	24	Omar Gonzalez		(substituted on) 89'
Manager: (Note: German manager Jürgen Klinsmann was not on the sideline for the game following a suspension by CONCACAF for arguing a foul on DaMarcus Beasley in the previous match. Herzog and Vásquez were temporary replacement managers.)
(Austria) Andreas Herzog; Martín Vásquez

GK	1	Jaime Penedo
RB	2	Leonel Parris	(yellow card) 90+1'
CB	23	Roberto Chen
CB	5	Román Torres (c)
LB	4	Carlos Rodríguez
RM	8	Marcos Sánchez
CM	6	Gabriel Gómez		(substituted off) 74'
CM	20	Aníbal Godoy
LM	19	Alberto Quintero
CF	7	Blas Pérez
CF	9	Gabriel Torres		(substituted off) 64'
Substitutions:
MF	18	Jairo Jiménez	(yellow card) 90+4'	(substituted on) 64'
FW	16	Rolando Blackburn		(substituted on) 74'
Manager:
Julio Dely Valdés

Assistant referees:
Juan Zumba (El Salvador)
Ricardo Morgan (Jamaica)
Fourth official:
Enrico Wijngaarde (Suriname)
Fifth official:
Hermenerito Leal (Guatemala)
