= 2013 CONCACAF Gold Cup knockout stage =

The knockout stage of the 2013 CONCACAF Gold Cup started on July 20 and ended with the final on July 28, 2013.

All times are U.S. Eastern Daylight Time (UTC−4).

== Qualified teams ==
The group winners and runners-up and the two best third-placed teams from the group stage advanced to the knockout stage.

Group	Winners	Runners-up	Third place (Best two qualified)
A	Panama	Mexico	—N/a
B	Honduras	Trinidad and Tobago	El Salvador
C	United States	Costa Rica	Cuba

== Bracket ==
Quarter-finals
July 20 – Atlanta
Mexico	1
Trinidad and Tobago	0
July 20 – Atlanta
Panama	6
Cuba	1
July 21 – Baltimore
Honduras	1
Costa Rica	0
July 21 – Baltimore
United States	5
El Salvador	1

Semi-finals
July 24 – Arlington
Mexico	1
Panama	2
July 24 – Arlington
Honduras	1
United States	3

Final
July 28 – Chicago
Panama	0
United States	1

== Quarter-finals ==
=== Panama vs Cuba ===
July 20, 2013
15:30

Panama	6–1	Cuba
G. Torres 25' (pen.), 37'; C. Rodríguez 68'; B. Pérez 78', 88'; Jiménez 85'	Report	Alfonso 21'

Georgia Dome, Atlanta
Attendance: 54,229
Referee: Mark Geiger (United States)

Panama	Cuba

GK	1	Jaime Penedo
RB	2	Leonel Parris
CB	5	Román Torres (c)
CB	23	Roberto Chen
LB	4	Carlos Rodríguez
RM	8	Marcos Sánchez
CM	6	Gabriel Gómez
CM	20	Aníbal Godoy	(yellow card) 55'	(substituted off) 71'
LM	19	Alberto Quintero		(substituted off) 82'
CF	7	Blas Pérez
CF	9	Gabriel Torres		(substituted off) 80'
Substitutions:
MF	18	Jairo Jiménez		(substituted on) 71'
MF	10	Eybir Bonaga		(substituted on) 80'
DF	17	Roderick Miller		(substituted on) 82'
Manager:
Julio Dely Valdés

GK	1	Odelín Molina
RB	6	Yoel Colomé
CB	13	Jorge Corrales	(yellow card) 26'	(substituted off) 78'
CB	15	Renay Malblanche	(yellow card) 28'
LB	14	Aliannis Urgellés
RM	8	Jaime Colomé
CM	20	Alberto Gómez
CM	4	Yasmany López	(yellow card) 61'	(substituted off) 63'
CM	3	Yénier Márquez (c)
LM	11	Ariel Martínez	(red card) 58'
CF	9	José Ciprian Alfonso
Substitutions:
MF	18	Libán Pérez		(substituted on) 63'
FW	22	Yaandri Puga		(substituted on) 78'
Manager:
Walter Benítez

Assistant referees:
Joe Fletcher (Canada)
Eric Boria (United States)
Fourth official:
Jair Marrufo (United States)
Fifth official:
Christian Ramírez (Honduras)

=== Mexico vs Trinidad and Tobago ===
July 20, 2013
18:30

Mexico	1–0	Trinidad and Tobago
R. Jiménez 84'	Report

Georgia Dome, Atlanta
Attendance: 54,229
Referee: Joel Aguilar (El Salvador)

Mexico	Trinidad and Tobago

GK	1	Jonathan Orozco
RB	19	Miguel Layún
CB	18	Juan Carlos Valenzuela
CB	4	Joel Huiqui (c)
LB	13	Adrián Aldrete
CM	22	Alejandro Castro
CM	8	Luis Montes	(yellow card) 61'	(substituted off) 89'
CM	6	Carlos Peña		(substituted off) 69'
AM	10	Marco Fabián
CF	9	Raúl Jiménez
CF	11	Rafael Márquez Lugo		(substituted off) 75'
Substitutions:
MF	24	José María Cárdenas		(substituted on) 69'
FW	21	Javier Orozco		(substituted on) 75'
DF	15	Efraín Velarde		(substituted on) 89'
Manager:
José Manuel de la Torre

GK	21	Jan-Michael Williams
DF	32	Radanfah Abu Bakr	(yellow card) 59'
DF	25	Aubrey David
DF	6	Daneil Cyrus
CB	20	Seon Power
RM	19	Keon Daniel	(yellow card) 61'
LM	11	Carlos Edwards		(substituted off) 89'
MF	14	Andre Boucaud		(substituted off) 88'
MF	12	Darryl Roberts
FW	9	Kenwyne Jones (c)
FW	13	Cornell Glen
Substitutions:
MF	7	Chris Birchall		(substituted on) 88'
MF	16	Kevon Carter		(substituted on) 89'
Manager:
Stephen Hart

Assistant referees:
Juan Zumba (El Salvador)
Octavio Jara (Costa Rica)
Fourth official:
Wálter Quesada (Costa Rica)
Fifth official:
Christian Ramírez (Honduras)

=== United States vs El Salvador ===
July 21, 2013
16:00

United States	5–1	El Salvador
Goodson 21'; Corona 29'; E. Johnson 60'; Donovan 78'; Diskerud 84'	Report	Zelaya 39' (pen.)

M&T Bank Stadium, Baltimore
Attendance: 70,540
Referee: Enrico Wijngaarde (Suriname)

United States	El Salvador

GK	1	Nick Rimando
RB	15	Michael Parkhurst
CB	21	Clarence Goodson	(yellow card) 15'
CB	25	Matt Besler		(substituted off) 75'
LB	7	DaMarcus Beasley (c)
RM	6	Joe Corona
CM	8	Mix Diskerud
CM	14	Kyle Beckerman
LM	16	José Torres		(substituted off) 66'
CF	10	Landon Donovan
CF	19	Chris Wondolowski		(substituted off) 60'
Substitutions:
FW	26	Eddie Johnson		(substituted on) 60'
MF	23	Brek Shea		(substituted on) 66'
DF	4	Michael Orozco		(substituted on) 75'
Manager:
(Germany) Jürgen Klinsmann

GK	1	Dagoberto Portillo
RB	2	Xavier García
CB	23	José Henríquez
CB	3	Víctor Turcios (c)
LB	16	Marcelo Posadas
RM	7	Darwin Céren	(yellow card) 68'
CM	12	Andrés Flores
CM	6	Richard Menjivar
LM	8	Osael Romero		(substituted off) 46'
CF	17	Léster Blanco		(substituted off) 46'
CF	11	Rodolfo Zelaya		(substituted off) 73'
Substitutions:
FW	9	Rafael Burgos		(substituted on) 46'
MF	10	Kevin Santamaria		(substituted on) 46'
MF	19	Gerson Mayen		(substituted on) 73'
Manager:
(Peru) Agustín Castillo

Assistant referees:
Marvin Torrentera (Mexico)
Ramon Ricardo Louisville (Suriname)
Fourth official:
David Gantar (Canada)
Fifth official:
Hermenerito Leal (Guatemala)

=== Honduras vs Costa Rica ===
July 21, 2013
19:00

Honduras	1–0	Costa Rica
Najar 49'	Report

M&T Bank Stadium, Baltimore
Attendance: 70,540
Referee: Courtney Campbell (Jamaica)

Honduras	Costa Rica

GK	22	Donis Escober
RB	13	Nery Medina
CB	3	Brayan Beckeles
CB	2	Osman Chávez (c)	(yellow card) 36'
LB	6	Juan Carlos García
DM	23	Edder Delgado
CM	20	Jorge Claros	(yellow card) 59'
RW	14	Andy Najar
AM	16	Alexander López		(substituted off) 71'
LW	17	Marvin Chávez		(substituted off) 71'
CF	11	Rony Martínez		(substituted off) 90+2'
Substitutions:
MF	15	Mario Berríos	(yellow card) 89'	(substituted on) 71'
MF	19	Wilmer Fuentes		(substituted on) 71'
FW	21	Roger Rojas		(substituted on) 90+2'
Manager:
(Colombia) Luis Fernando Suárez

GK	18	Patrick Pemberton
RB	6	Juan Diego Madrigal
CB	3	Giancarlo González
CB	19	Roy Miller
LB	15	Junior Díaz
CM	17	Yeltsin Tejeda
CM	5	Celso Borges
RW	11	Michael Barrantes	(yellow card) 69'	(substituted off) 75'
AM	8	Kenny Cunningham		(substituted off) 65'
LW	9	Álvaro Saborío (c)	(yellow card) 30'
CF	22	Jairo Arrieta		(substituted off) 72'
Substitutions:
MF	10	Osvaldo Rodríguez		(substituted on) 65'
FW	12	Yendrick Ruiz		(substituted on) 72'
MF	7	Mauricio Castillo		(substituted on) 75'
Manager:
(Colombia) Jorge Luis Pinto

Assistant referees:
Ricardo Morgan (Jamaica)
Garnet Page (Jamaica)
Fourth official:
Marco Rodríguez (Mexico)
Fifth official:
Hermenerito Leal (Guatemala)

== Semi-finals ==
=== United States vs Honduras ===
July 24, 2013
19:00

United States	3–1	Honduras
E. Johnson 11'; Donovan 27', 53'	Report	Medina 52'

Cowboys Stadium, Arlington
Attendance: 81,410
Referee: Wálter Quesada (Costa Rica)

United States	Honduras

GK	1	Nick Rimando
RB	15	Michael Parkhurst
CB	25	Matt Besler
CB	21	Clarence Goodson
LB	7	DaMarcus Beasley (c)
DM	14	Kyle Beckerman		(substituted off) 67'
RM	20	Alejandro Bedoya
CM	11	Stu Holden
LM	16	José Torres		(substituted off) 67'
CF	10	Landon Donovan		(substituted off) 72'
CF	26	Eddie Johnson	(yellow card) 90+3'
Substitutions:
MF	8	Mix Diskerud		(substituted on) 67'
MF	23	Brek Shea		(substituted on) 67'
FW	19	Chris Wondolowski		(substituted on) 72'
Manager:
(Germany) Jürgen Klinsmann			(red card) 87'

GK	22	Donis Escober
RB	13	Nery Medina
CB	3	Brayan Beckeles
CB	2	Osman Chávez (c)
LB	6	Juan Carlos García
RM	20	Jorge Claros
CM	23	Edder Delgado
CM	16	Alexander López	(substituted off) 46'
LM	14	Andy Najar
CF	7	Diego Reyes	(substituted off) 46'
CF	21	Roger Rojas	(substituted off) 69'
Substitutions:
MF	17	Marvin Chávez	(substituted on) 46'
FW	9	Jerry Palacios	(substituted on) 46'
FW	11	Rony Martínez	(substituted on) 69'
Manager:
(Colombia) Luis Fernando Suárez

Assistant referees:
Octavio Jara (Costa Rica)
Hermenerito Leal (Guatemala)
Fourth official:
Jeffrey Solis Calderón (Costa Rica)
Fifth official:
Garnet Page (Jamaica)

=== Panama vs Mexico ===
July 24, 2013
22:00

Panama	2–1	Mexico
B. Pérez 13'; R. Torres 61'	Report	Montes 26'

Cowboys Stadium, Arlington
Attendance: 81,410
Referee: Courtney Campbell (Jamaica)

Panama	Mexico

GK	1	Jaime Penedo
RB	2	Leonel Parris
CB	23	Roberto Chen
CB	5	Román Torres (c)
LB	4	Carlos Rodríguez
CM	6	Gabriel Gómez		(substituted off) 90'
CM	20	Aníbal Godoy
RW	8	Marcos Sánchez
LW	19	Alberto Quintero	(yellow card) 45'	(substituted off) 66'
CF	7	Blas Pérez
CF	9	Gabriel Torres		(substituted off) 76'
Substitutions:
MF	18	Jairo Jiménez		(substituted on) 66'
FW	11	Cecilio Waterman		(substituted on) 76'
DF	3	Harold Cummings		(substituted on) 90'
Manager:
Julio Dely Valdés

GK	1	Jonathan Orozco
RB	19	Miguel Layún
CB	4	Joel Huiqui (c)
CB	18	Juan Carlos Valenzuela	(yellow card) 36'
LB	13	Adrián Aldrete
DM	6	Carlos Peña		(substituted off) 46'
CM	8	Luis Montes
CM	22	Alejandro Castro	(yellow card) 54'	(substituted off) 67'
AM	10	Marco Fabián
CF	11	Rafael Márquez Lugo		(substituted off) 72'
CF	9	Raúl Jiménez
Substitutions:
MF	14	Jorge Enríquez		(substituted on) 46'
FW	21	Javier Orozco		(substituted on) 67'
FW	17	Isaác Brizuela		(substituted on) 72'
Manager:
José Manuel de la Torre

Assistant referees:
Joe Fletcher (Canada)
Ramon Ricardo Louisville (Suriname)
Fourth official:
Elmer Bonilla (El Salvador)
Fifth official:
Garnet Page (Jamaica)

== Final ==
July 28, 2013
16:00

United States	1–0	Panama
Shea 69'	Report

Soldier Field, Chicago
Attendance: 57,920
Referee: Joel Aguilar (El Salvador)

United States	Panama

GK	1	Nick Rimando
RB	15	Michael Parkhurst
CB	25	Matt Besler
CB	21	Clarence Goodson
LB	7	DaMarcus Beasley (c)
CM	14	Kyle Beckerman
CM	11	Stu Holden		(substituted off) 23'
AM	20	Alejandro Bedoya	(yellow card) 63'	(substituted off) 89'
AM	6	Joe Corona		(substituted off) 68'
CF	10	Landon Donovan
CF	26	Eddie Johnson	(yellow card) 90'
Substitutions:
MF	8	Mix Diskerud		(substituted on) 23'
MF	23	Brek Shea	(yellow card) 90+4'	(substituted on) 68'
DF	24	Omar Gonzalez		(substituted on) 89'
Manager: (Note: German manager Jürgen Klinsmann was not on the sideline for the game following a suspension by CONCACAF for arguing a foul on DaMarcus Beasley in the previous match. Herzog and Vásquez were temporary replacement managers.)
(Austria) Andreas Herzog; Martín Vásquez

GK	1	Jaime Penedo
RB	2	Leonel Parris	(yellow card) 90+1'
CB	23	Roberto Chen
CB	5	Román Torres (c)
LB	4	Carlos Rodríguez
RM	8	Marcos Sánchez
CM	6	Gabriel Gómez		(substituted off) 74'
CM	20	Aníbal Godoy
LM	19	Alberto Quintero
CF	7	Blas Pérez
CF	9	Gabriel Torres		(substituted off) 64'
Substitutions:
MF	18	Jairo Jiménez	(yellow card) 90+4'	(substituted on) 64'
FW	16	Rolando Blackburn		(substituted on) 74'
Manager:
Julio Dely Valdés

Assistant referees:
Juan Zumba (El Salvador)
Ricardo Morgan (Jamaica)
Fourth official:
Enrico Wijngaarde (Suriname)
Fifth official:
Hermenerito Leal (Guatemala)
