= 2013 CONCACAF Gold Cup disciplinary record =

In the 2013 CONCACAF Gold Cup the main disciplinary action taken against players comes in the form of red and yellow cards.

Any player picking up a red card is expelled from the pitch and automatically banned for his country's next match, whether via a straight red or second yellow. After a straight red card, FIFA will conduct a hearing and may extend this ban beyond one match. If the ban extends beyond the end of the finals (i.e. if a player is sent off in the match in which his team was eliminated), it must be served in the team's next competitive international match(es).

== Disciplinary statistics ==
- Total number of yellow cards: **68**
- Average yellow cards per match: **2.72**
- Total number of red cards: **4**
- Average red cards per match: **0.16**
- First yellow card: Will Johnson – Canada against Martinique
- First red card: Jacky Berdix – Martinique against Panama
- Fastest yellow card from kick off: **5 minutes** – Richard Menjivar – El Salvador against Honduras
- Fastest yellow card after coming on as substitute: **1 minute** – Evral Trapp – Belize against Cuba
- Latest yellow card in a match without extra time: **90+4 minutes** – Jairo Jiménez – Panama against USA
- Fastest dismissal from kick off: **38 minutes** – José David Velásquez – Honduras against Trinidad and Tobago
- Fastest dismissal of a substitute: **none**
- Latest dismissal in a match without extra time: **81 minutes** – Ian Gaynair – Belize against Cuba
- Latest dismissal in a match with extra time: **none**
- Least time difference between two yellow cards given to the same player: **17 minutes** – Ian Gaynair – Belize against Cuba (Gaynair was booked in the 64th minute and again in the 81st resulting in his dismissal.)
- Most yellow cards (team): **7** – (4 teams) Haiti, Costa Rica, USA, Cuba,
- Most red cards (team): **1** – (4 teams) Martinique, Cuba, Belize, Honduras
- Fewest yellow cards (team): **3** – Canada
- Most yellow cards (player): **3** – **Ian Gaynair** (Name in **bold** indicates 2 yellows in same game.)
- Most red cards (player): **1** – (4 players) Jacky Berdix, José David Velásquez, Ariel Martínez, Ian Gaynair
- Most yellow cards (match): **5** – (5 matches) El Salvador vs Haiti, Cuba vs Belize, USA vs Costa Rica, Honduras vs Costa Rica, USA vs. Panama
- Most red cards (match): **1** – (4 matches) Panama vs Martinique, Honduras vs Trinidad and Tobago, Cuba vs Belize, Panama vs Cuba
- Fewest yellow cards (match): **0** – (2 matches) Mexico vs Panama, Costa Rica vs Cuba
- Most cards in one match: **5 yellow cards + 1 second yellow** - Cuba vs. Belize

== Sanctions ==
=== By match ===
Note: In this table the "Yellow" column counts only the first yellow card given to a player in a match. If a player receives a second yellow in the same match this is counted under "Second yellow". This second yellow is not counted as a "Straight Red".

Day	Match	Round	Referee	Total cards	Yellow	Second yellow	Straight red
Day 1	Canada vs Martinique	Group A	(Cuba) Marcos Brea	4	4	0	0
Day 1	Mexico vs Panama	Group A	(Suriname) Enrico Wijngaarde	0	0	0	0
Day 2	El Salvador vs Trinidad and Tobago	Group B	(Mexico) Marco Antonio Rodríguez	1	1	0	0
Day 2	Haiti vs Honduras	Group B	(Costa Rica) Hugo Cruz	3	3	0	0
Day 3	Costa Rica vs Cuba	Group C	(El Salvador) Elmer Bonilla	0	0	0	0
Day 3	Belize vs United States	Group C	(Honduras) Héctor Francisco Rodríguez	2	2	0	0
Day 4	Panama vs Martinique	Group A	(Honduras) Armando Castro Oviedo	3	2	1	0
Day 4	Mexico vs Canada	Group A	(El Salvador) Joel Aguilar	2	2	0	0
Day 5	Trinidad and Tobago vs Haiti	Group B	(Costa Rica) Jeffrey Solis Calderón	2	2	0	0
Day 5	Honduras vs El Salvador	Group B	(United States) Jair Marrufo	3	3	0	0
Day 6	United States vs Cuba	Group C	(Canada) David Gantar	1	1	0	0
Day 6	Costa Rica vs Belize	Group C	(Suriname) Enrico Wijngaarde	3	3	0	0
Day 7	Panama vs Canada	Group A	(Costa Rica) Walter Quesada	1	1	0	0
Day 7	Martinique vs Mexico	Group A	(United States) Marc Geiger	3	3	0	0
Day 8	El Salvador vs Haiti	Group B	(Puerto Rico) Javier Santos	5	5	0	0
Day 8	Honduras vs Trinidad and Tobago	Group B	(El Salvador) Joel Aguilar	4	3	0	1
Day 9	Cuba vs Belize	Group C	(Suriname) Enrico Wijngaarde	6	5	1	0
Day 9	United States vs Costa Rica	Group C	(Jamaica) Courtney Campbell	5	5	0	0
Day 10	Panama vs Cuba	Quarterfinals	(United States) Marc Geiger	5	4	0	1
Day 10	Mexico vs Trinidad and Tobago	Quarterfinals	(El Salvador) Joel Aguilar	3	3	0	0
Day 11	United States vs El Salvador	Quarterfinals	(Suriname) Enrico Wijngaarde	2	2	0	0
Day 11	Honduras vs Costa Rica	Quarterfinals	(Jamaica) Courtney Campbell	5	5	0	0
Day 12	United States vs Honduras	Semifinal	(Costa Rica) Walter Quesada	1	1	0	0
Day 12	Panama vs Mexico	Semifinal	(Jamaica) Courtney Campbell	3	3	0	0
Day 12	United States vs Panama	Final	(El Salvador) Joel Aguilar	5	5	0	0
Total				72	68	2	2

=== By referee ===
Referee	Matches	Red	Yellow	Red Cards	PKs awarded
(Cuba) Marcos Brea	1	0	4		
(Suriname) Enrico Wijngaarde	5	1	9	1 second yellow	1
(Mexico) Marco Antonio Rodríguez	1	0	1		1
(Costa Rica) Hugo Cruz	1	0	3		
(El Salvador) Elmer Bonilla	1	0	0		
(Honduras) Héctor Francisco Rodríguez	1	0	2		1
(Honduras) Armando Castro Oviedo	1	1	2	1 second yellow	1
(El Salvador) Joel Aguilar	4	1	13	1 straight red	1
(Costa Rica) Jeffrey Solis Calderón	1	0	2		
(United States) Jair Marrufo	1	0	3		
(Canada) David Gantar	1	0	1		1
(Costa Rica) Walter Quesada	2	0	2		1
(United States) Marc Geiger	2	1	7	1 straight red	2
(Puerto Rico) Javier Santos	1	0	5		1
(Jamaica) Courtney Campbell	3	0	13		
Total	25	4	68	2 straight red 2 second yellow	10

=== By team ===
Team	Yellow	Red	Red Cards	Reason	Suspensions
Belize	5	1	I. Gaynair vs Cuba second yellow		I. Gaynair
Canada	3	0			
Costa Rica	7	0			
Cuba	7	1	A. Martinez vs Panama straight red card	dangerous play	A. Martinez
Haiti	7	0			
Honduras	6	1	J. Velásquez vs Trinidad and Tobago straight red card	tackling	J. Velásquez vs Costa Rica
Mexico	5	0			
Martinique	6	1	J. Berdix vs Panama second yellow		J. Berdix vs Mexico
Panama	5	0			
El Salvador	4	0			
Trinidad and Tobago	6	0			
United States	7	0			
