= 2013 CONCACAF Gold Cup Group A =

Group A of the 2013 CONCACAF Gold Cup was one of three groups competing at the tournament. The group's first round of matches were played on July 7, with the final round played on July 14. All six group matches were played at venues in the United States: in Pasadena, California, in Seattle, Washington, and in Denver, Colorado. The group consisted of six-time (and defending) Gold Cup champions, Mexico, as well as 2000 Gold Cup champion Canada, Martinique and Panama.

== Standings ==
Key to colors in group tables
Teams that advanced to the quarter-finals: Group winners; Group runners-up; Best two third-placed teams among all groups

Pos	Team	Pld	W	D	L	GF	GA	GD	Pts	Qualification
1	Panama	3	2	1	0	3	1	+2	7	Advance to knockout stage
2	Mexico	3	2	0	1	6	3	+3	6	Advance to knockout stage
3	Martinique	3	1	0	2	2	4	−2	3	
4	Canada	3	0	1	2	0	3	−3	1	

== Matches ==
All times are EDT (UTC−4).

=== Canada vs Martinique ===
July 7, 2013
17:30

Canada	0–1	Martinique
	Report	Reuperné 90+3'

Rose Bowl, Pasadena
Attendance: 56,822
Referee: Marcos Brea (Cuba)

Canada	Martinique

GK	18	Milan Borjan
RB	2	Nikolas Ledgerwood
CB	5	David Edgar
CB	20	Doneil Henry
LB	17	Marcel de Jong
RM	6	Julian de Guzman
CM	8	Will Johnson (c)	(yellow card) 35'	(substituted off) 51'
CM	14	Samuel Piette
LM	7	Russell Teibert	(yellow card) 85'
CF	11	Marcus Haber		(substituted off) 86'
CF	9	Tosaint Ricketts
Substitutions:
FW	10	Simeon Jackson		(substituted on) 51'
MF	21	Jonathan Osorio		(substituted on) 86'
Manager:
Colin Miller

GK	23	Kévin Olimpa
RB	2	Nicolas Zaïre	(yellow card) 38'
CB	18	Grégory Arnolin	(yellow card) 72'
CB	22	Jean-Sylvain Babin
LB	13	Olivier Thomert		(substituted off) 76'
CM	4	Daniel Herelle		(substituted off) 79'
CM	21	Sébastien Crétinoir
CM	17	Kévin Parsemain (c)
RW	7	Steve Gustan
LW	9	Frédéric Piquionne
CF	11	Yoann Arquin		(substituted off) 80'
Substitutions:
MF	5	Gaël Germany		(substituted on) 76'
MF	14	Fabrice Reuperné		(substituted on) 79'
FW	19	Mathias Coureur		(substituted on) 80'
Manager:
Patrick Cavelan

Assistant referees:
Juan Zumba (El Salvador)
Christian Ramírez (Honduras)
Fourth official:
Joel Aguilar (El Salvador)

=== Mexico vs Panama ===
July 7, 2013
20:00

Mexico	1–2	Panama
Fabián 45+2'	Report	G. Torres 7' (pen.), 48'

Rose Bowl, Pasadena
Attendance: 56,822
Referee: Wálter Quesada (Costa Rica)

Mexico	Panama

GK	1	Jonathan Orozco
RB	2	Israel Jiménez
CB	4	Joel Huiqui (c)
CB	20	Jair Pereira	(substituted off) 46'
LB	13	Adrián Aldrete
CM	14	Jorge Enríquez
CM	22	Alejandro Castro	(substituted off) 46'
RW	9	Raúl Jiménez
AM	10	Marco Fabián
LW	15	Efraín Velarde	(substituted off) 74'
CF	11	Rafael Márquez Lugo
Substitutions:
MF	6	Carlos Peña	(substituted on) 46'
DF	18	Juan Carlos Valenzuela	(substituted on) 46'
FW	17	Isaác Brizuela	(substituted on) 74'
Manager:
José Manuel de la Torre

GK	1	Jaime Penedo
RB	23	Roberto Chen
CB	4	Carlos Rodríguez
CB	5	Román Torres (c)
LB	2	Leonel Parris
CM	6	Gabriel Gómez	(substituted off) 84'
CM	20	Aníbal Godoy
RW	8	Marcos Sánchez
LW	19	Alberto Quintero
CF	11	Cecilio Waterman	(substituted off) 70'
CF	9	Gabriel Torres	(substituted off) 87'
Substitutions:
FW	16	Rolando Blackburn	(substituted on) 70'
DF	14	Juan Pérez	(substituted on) 84'
DF	3	Harold Cummings	(substituted on) 87'
Manager:
Julio Dely Valdés

Assistant referees:
Sean Hurd (United States)
Octavio Jara (Costa Rica)
Fourth official:
Mark Geiger (United States)

=== Panama vs Martinique ===
July 11, 2013
20:30

Panama	1–0	Martinique
G. Torres 85' (pen.)	Report

CenturyLink Field, Seattle
Attendance: 28,354
Referee: Armando Castro (Honduras)

Panama	Martinique

GK	1	Jaime Penedo
RB	23	Roberto Chen
CB	4	Carlos Rodríguez
CB	5	Román Torres (c)
LB	2	Leonel Parris
RM	8	Marcos Sánchez
CM	6	Gabriel Gómez
CM	20	Aníbal Godoy
LM	19	Alberto Quintero	(substituted off) 84'
CF	9	Gabriel Torres	(substituted off) 87'
CF	11	Cecilio Waterman	(substituted off) 65'
Substitutions:
FW	7	Blas Pérez	(substituted on) 65'
MF	18	Jairo Jiménez	(substituted on) 84'
MF	14	Juan Pérez	(substituted on) 87'
Manager:
Julio Dely Valdés

GK	23	Kévin Olimpa
RB	12	Jacky Berdix	(yellow card) 20' (yellow-red card) 73'
CB	18	Grégory Arnolin
CB	22	Jean-Sylvain Babin
LB	13	Olivier Thomert
CM	4	Daniel Herelle	(yellow card) 87'
CM	21	Sébastien Crétinoir
CM	17	Kévin Parsemain (c)
RF	7	Steve Gustan
CF	19	Mathias Coureur		(substituted off) 76'
LF	9	Frédéric Piquionne		(substituted off) 79'
Substitutions:
MF	5	Gaël Germany		(substituted on) 76'
FW	11	Yoann Arquin		(substituted on) 79'
Manager:
Patrick Cavelan

Assistant referees:
Christian Ramírez (Honduras)
Octavio Jara (Costa Rica)
Fourth official:
Mark Geiger (United States)

=== Mexico vs Canada ===
July 11, 2013
23:00

Mexico	2–0	Canada
R. Jiménez 42'; Fabián 57' (pen.)	Report

CenturyLink Field, Seattle
Attendance: 28,354
Referee: Joel Aguilar (El Salvador)

Mexico	Canada

GK	1	Jonathan Orozco
RB	19	Miguel Layún
CB	4	Joel Huiqui (c)
CB	18	Juan Carlos Valenzuela
LB	13	Adrián Aldrete
CM	14	Jorge Enríquez		(substituted off) 54'
CM	8	Luis Montes	(yellow card) 88'
RW	9	Raúl Jiménez
AM	10	Marco Fabián		(substituted off) 78'
LW	15	Efraín Velarde
CF	11	Rafael Márquez Lugo		(substituted off) 73'
Substitutions:
DF	22	Alejandro Castro		(substituted on) 54'
MF	16	Miguel Ángel Ponce		(substituted on) 73'
FW	21	Javier Orozco		(substituted on) 78'
Manager:
José Manuel de la Torre

GK	18	Milan Borjan
RB	2	Nikolas Ledgerwood
CB	5	David Edgar	(yellow card) 67'
CB	20	Doneil Henry
LB	17	Marcel de Jong
CM	15	Kyle Bekker		(substituted off) 83'
CM	6	Julian de Guzman (c)
CM	21	Jonathan Osorio
RW	12	Issey Nakajima-Farran		(substituted off) 62'
LW	14	Samuel Piette
CF	11	Marcus Haber		(substituted off) 46'
Substitutions:
FW	9	Tosaint Ricketts		(substituted on) 46'
FW	4	Kyle Porter		(substituted on) 62'
MF	23	Keven Aleman		(substituted on) 83'
Manager:
Colin Miller

Assistant referees:
William Torres Mejía (El Salvador)
Juan Zumba (El Salvador)
Fourth official:
Marcos Brea (Cuba)

=== Panama vs Canada ===
July 14, 2013
15:30

Panama	0–0	Canada
	Report

Sports Authority Field, Denver
Attendance: 30,000
Referee: Wálter Quesada (Costa Rica)

Panama	Canada

GK	12	Luis Mejía
RB	23	Roberto Chen
CB	3	Harold Cummings
CB	13	Jean Cedeño	(yellow card) 25'
LB	21	Richard Dixon
CM	14	Juan Pérez		(substituted off) 73'
CM	10	Eybir Bonaga		(substituted off) 89'
RW	18	Jairo Jiménez
LW	8	Marcos Sánchez
CF	7	Blas Pérez (c)
CF	16	Rolando Blackburn		(substituted off) 76'
Substitutions:
MF	6	Gabriel Gómez		(substituted on) 73'
FW	11	Cecilio Waterman		(substituted on) 76'
MF	20	Aníbal Godoy		(substituted on) 89'
Manager:
Julio Dely Valdés

GK	18	Milan Borjan
RB	2	Nikolas Ledgerwood
CB	20	Doneil Henry
CB	5	David Edgar
LB	3	Ashtone Morgan
CM	13	Pedro Pacheco	(substituted off) 58'
CM	6	Julian de Guzman (c)
RW	21	Jonathan Osorio
AM	15	Kyle Bekker	(substituted off) 81'
LW	17	Marcel de Jong	(substituted off) 65'
CF	11	Marcus Haber
Substitutions:
FW	9	Tosaint Ricketts	(substituted on) 58'
FW	4	Kyle Porter	(substituted on) 65'
MF	12	Issey Nakajima-Farran	(substituted on) 81'
Manager:
Colin Miller

Assistant referees:
Christian Ramírez (Honduras)
Octavio Jara (Costa Rica)
Fourth official:
Marcos Brea (Cuba)

=== Martinique vs Mexico ===
July 14, 2013
18:00

Martinique	1–3	Mexico
Parsemain 43' (pen.)	Report	Fabián 21'; Montes 34'; Ponce 90'

Sports Authority Field, Denver
Attendance: 30,000
Referee: Mark Geiger (United States)

Martinique	Mexico

GK	23	Kévin Olimpa
RB	8	Audrick Linord		(substituted off) 36'
CB	18	Grégory Arnolin
CB	22	Jean-Sylvain Babin
LB	13	Olivier Thomert	(yellow card) 19'
RM	5	Gaël Germany
CM	4	Daniel Herelle	(yellow card) 29'
CM	17	Kévin Parsemain (c)
CM	14	Fabrice Reuperné		(substituted off) 79'
LM	7	Steve Gustan
CF	15	Jordy Delem		(substituted off) 57'
Substitutions:
MF	20	Stéphane Abaul		(substituted on) 36'
DF	21	Sébastien Crétinoir		(substituted on) 57'
FW	10	Kevin Tresfield		(substituted on) 79'
Manager:
Patrick Cavelan

GK	23	Moisés Muñoz
RB	19	Miguel Layún
CB	18	Juan Carlos Valenzuela
CB	4	Joel Huiqui (c)
LB	13	Adrián Aldrete
CM	22	Alejandro Castro	(yellow card) 45+1'
CM	8	Luis Montes
CM	6	Carlos Peña		(substituted off) 70'
AM	10	Marco Fabián		(substituted off) 88'
CF	9	Raúl Jiménez
CF	11	Rafael Márquez Lugo		(substituted off) 82'
Substitutions:
DF	15	Efraín Velarde		(substituted on) 70'
FW	21	Javier Orozco		(substituted on) 82'
MF	16	Miguel Ángel Ponce		(substituted on) 88'
Manager:
José Manuel de la Torre

Assistant referees:
Sean Hurd (United States)
William Torres Mejía (El Salvador)
Fourth official:
Joel Aguilar (El Salvador)
