= Luis Montes =

Mexican footballer (born 1986)

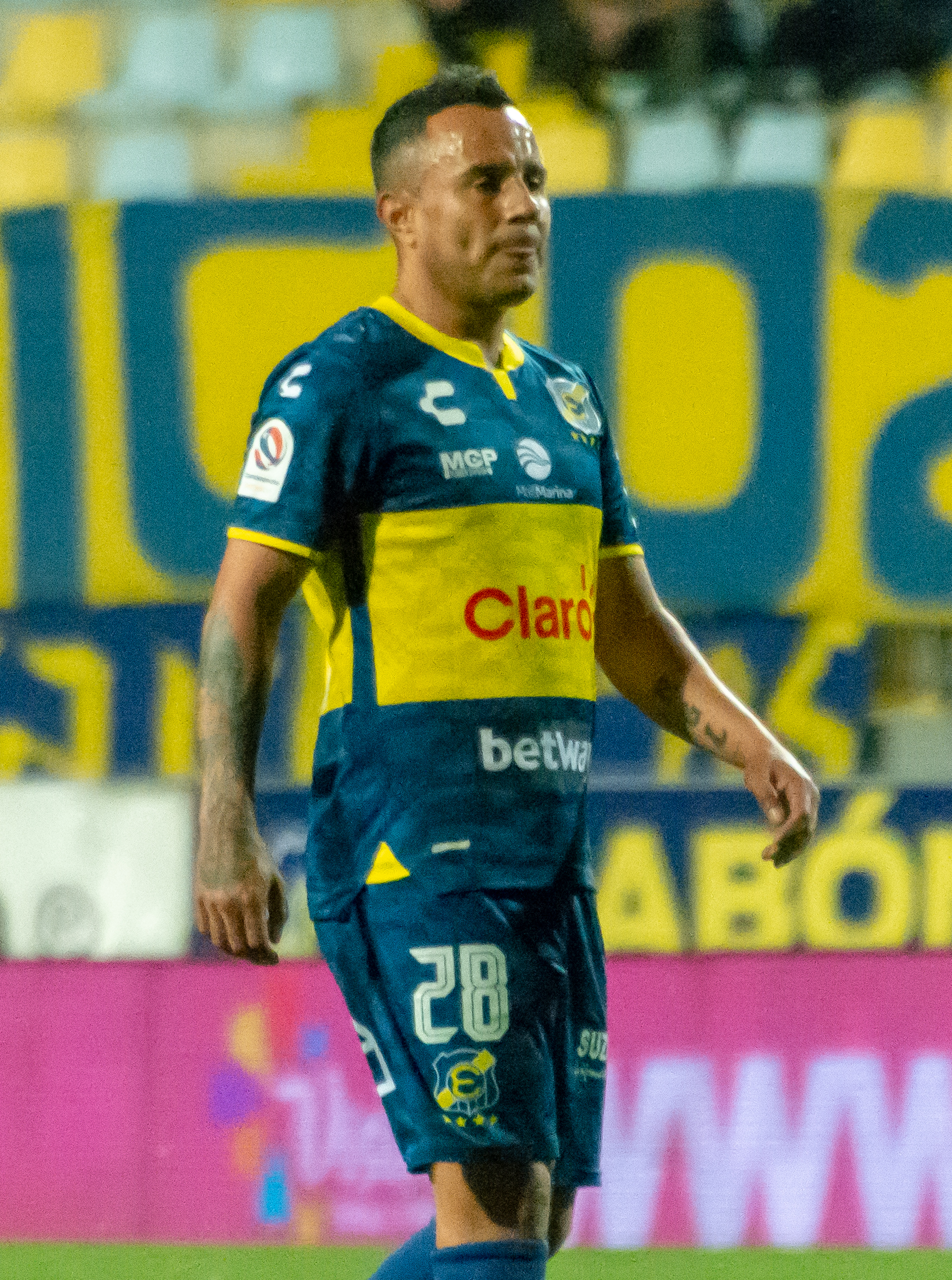
- Montes with Everton in 2023

Personal information
- Full name: Luis Arturo Montes Jiménez
- Date of birth: 15 May 1986 (age 40)
- Place of birth: Ciudad Juárez, Chihuahua, Mexico
- Height: 1.66 m (5 ft 5 in)
- Position: Midfielder

Youth career
- Pachuca

Senior career*
Years	Team	Apps	(Gls)
2005–2006	Indios	7	(0)
2007–2013	Pachuca	86	(7)
2011–2013	→ León (loan)	75	(12)
2013–2023	León	290	(42)
2023	→ Everton (loan)	22	(2)

International career^{‡}
2013–2019	Mexico	25	(5)
Medal record
Men's football
Representing Mexico
CONCACAF Gold Cup
Winner	2019 United States	Team
- * Club domestic league appearances and goals as of 11 December 2023 ‡ National team caps and goals as of 8 October 2022

Luis Arturo Montes Jiménez (born 15 May 1986), also known as Chapito, is a Mexican former professional footballer.

== Club career ==
Montes started his career playing for Pachuca's youth team. When he was 19 years old, he was loaned out to second-tier Indios de Ciudad Juárez.

Montes made his professional debut on January 8, 2006, in a league game against Irapuato, entering the game as a substitute for Luis Esqueda in the 79th minute in the Olimpico Benito Juarez Stadium.

Montes returned to Pachuca for the Clausura 2007 tournament and remained at the team through the Clausura 2011 tournament. He played 86 official league games for the first team, plus 25 international games in the Copa Sudamericana, CONCACAF Champions League, Club World Cup, Copa Libertadores and the now-defunct North American SuperLiga.

At the start of the 2011–12 season, Montes was transferred to, then second division side, Club Léon on a yearlong loan. He became an important first team player, playing a total of 38 games between the Apertura 2011 and the Clausura 2012 Tournaments. Club Léon clinched the Liga de Ascenso title, now Ascenso MX, and the promotion to the Primera Division.

== International career ==
Montes made his senior national team debut as a second-half substitute in a goalless friendly with Peru on 17 April 2013. He was selected by coach José Manuel de la Torre to participate in the 2013 CONCACAF Gold Cup held in the United States, and scored his first international goal on his third Mexico appearance, in a 3–1 win over Martinique in the group stage of the Gold Cup on 14 July.

Montes was selected in October 2013 by new coach Miguel Herrera to dispute the Intercontinental play-off between Mexico and New Zealand in which he played both games and helped Mexico qualify to the 2014 FIFA World Cup. Luis Montes received his first call up in 2014, in Mexico's first game in 2014 against South Korea. Eventually Montes was called up to be in Mexico's squad for the 2014 World Cup along with teammates, Carlos Peña, José Vázquez, and Rafael Márquez.

On 31 May 2014, in a friendly match against Ecuador two minutes after scoring a long range goal, Montes suffered a double fracture [tibia and fibula] in a challenge with Segundo Castillo. Due to the injury Montes missed the 2014 FIFA World Cup and did not return to action until 8 February 2015 against UNAM.

On 23 March 2019, Montes returned to international football in a 3–1 victory against Chile after a two-year absence. He also scored Mexico's fourth goal three days later in a 4–2 victory over Paraguay.

== Career statistics ==
=== International ===
As of match played 3 July 2019

National team	Year	Apps	Goals
Mexico	2013	8	2
Mexico	2014	4	1
Mexico	2015	5	0
Mexico	2016	1	0
Mexico	2017	1	0
Mexico	2019	6	2
Total		25	5

=== International goals ===
Scores and results list Mexico's goal tally first.

Goal	Date	Venue	Opponent	Score	Result	Competition
1	14 July 2013	Sports Authority Field at Mile High, Denver, United States	Martinique	2–0	3–1	2013 CONCACAF Gold Cup
2	24 July 2013	Cowboys Stadium, Arlington, United States	Panama	1–1	1–2	2013 CONCACAF Gold Cup
3	31 May 2014	AT&T Stadium, Arlington, United States	Ecuador	1–0	3–1	Friendly
4	26 March 2019	Levi's Stadium, Santa Clara, United States	Paraguay	4–2	4–2	Friendly
5	9 June 2019	AT&T Stadium, Arlington, United States	Ecuador	2–1	3–2	Friendly

== Honours ==
Pachuca

- North American SuperLiga: 2007
- CONCACAF Champions' Cup: 2008
- CONCACAF Champions League: 2009–10

León

- Liga MX: Apertura 2013, Clausura 2014, Guardianes 2020
- Ascenso MX: Clausura 2012
- Leagues Cup: 2021

Mexico

- CONCACAF Gold Cup: 2019

Individual

- CONCACAF Champions' Cup Top Scorer: 2008 (Shared)
- Liga MX Best XI: Clausura 2019, Guardianes 2020
- Liga MX Player of the Month: October 2020
- Liga MX Most Valuable Player: Guardianes 2020
- Liga MX Best Offensive Midfielder: 2020–21
