= Gabriel Torres =

Panamanian football player (born 1988)

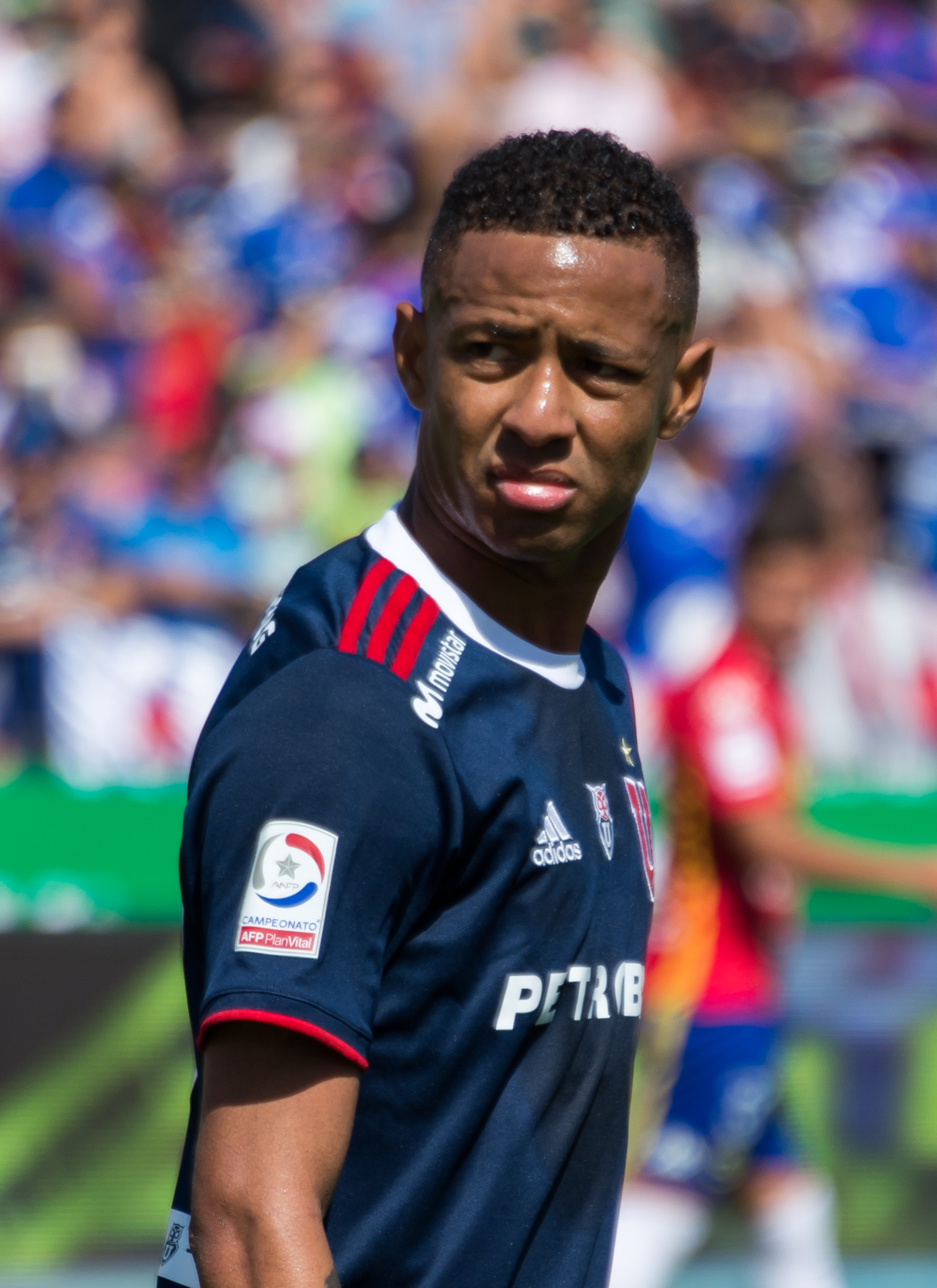
- Torres with Universidad de Chile in 2019

Personal information
- Full name: Gabriel Arturo Torres Tejada
- Date of birth: 31 October 1988 (age 38)
- Place of birth: Panama City, Panama
- Height: 1.80 m (5 ft 11 in)
- Position: Forward

Team information
- Current team: Veraguas United
- Number: 9

Senior career*
Years	Team	Apps	(Gls)
2003–2009	Chepo	94	(31)
2005–2006	→ San Francisco (loan)	35	(10)
2008	→ La Equidad (loan)	25	(6)
2009	→ América de Cali (loan)	1	(0)
2009	→ La Equidad (loan)	1	(0)
2010	→ Atlético Huila	6	(0)
2011	San Francisco	33	(7)
2011–2013	Zamora	68	(32)
2013–2015	Colorado Rapids	56	(10)
2013–2014	Colorado Rapids 2	2	(2)
2016	Zamora	23	(22)
2016–2017	Lausanne-Sport	42	(8)
2018	Huachipato	30	(15)
2019–2021	Universidad de Chile	12	(1)
2019–2020	→ Independiente del Valle (loan)	25	(15)
2021	UNAM	20	(1)
2021	Alajuelense	13	(5)
2022–2023	Antofagasta	21	(5)
2023	Zamora	9	(2)
2023–2024	Sporting San Miguelito	47	(16)
2025	Tauro	33	(9)
2026–	Veraguas United	0	(0)

International career^{‡}
- Panama U17
- Panama U20
2005–2022	Panama	103	(24)
- * Club domestic league appearances and goals as of 29 December 2024 ‡ National team caps and goals as of 9 June 2022

Gabriel Arturo Torres Tejada (born 31 October 1988) is a Panamanian professional footballer who plays as a forward for Liga Panameña de Fútbol club Veraguas United and the Panama national team.

== Career ==
=== Club ===
He was widely regarded as the top prospect from Panama and in 2007 he traveled twice to England to train with Manchester United and once in Spain with Valencia. On his second flight to Manchester he got injured on the second day of practice and had to return home, where he played for ANAPROF side Chepo. In 2008, he was loaned for 6 months to 2007 Mustang Cup runner-up La Equidad, his loan contract was later extended for 6 extra months. In his debut in Colombia, Torres scored in a 2–3 loss against Deportivo Pereira. In January 2009 Torres signed a loan contract for a year with current Mustang Cup champions América Cali. However, after missing the pre-season because of his participation in the 2009 UNCAF Nations Cup with Panama, he was relegated to the bench where he would spend most of his matches. On 30 March he was released from America after having returned to his home late and intoxicated, allegations Torres has denied. Gaby returned to Panama to play with Chepo in April 2009.

In January 2010 Torres moved abroad again to play for Colombian side Atlético Huila alongside compatriot Amílcar Henríquez and in July 2011 moved to Venezuelan side Zamora and he became the club's all-time top goalscorer in February 2013 after scoring his 29th goal against Portuguesa.

On 8 August 2013, Torres signed with the Colorado Rapids of Major League Soccer. He is the Rapids' first Designated Player.

== International ==
Torres made his debut for Panama in an October 2005 FIFA World Cup qualification match against Trinidad and Tobago. He was also captain of the Panama U-20 squad that took part in the 2007 FIFA World Youth Cup in Canada.

In May 2018, Torres was named in Panama's 23-man squad for the 2018 FIFA World Cup in Russia.

== Career statistics ==
=== International ===
As of match played 2 June 2022

Panama
Year	Apps	Goals
2005	2	0
2006	4	1
2007	4	0
2008	2	0
2009	3	0
2010	5	1
2011	11	0
2012	1	0
2013	12	7
2014	5	0
2015	3	0
2016	6	1
2017	13	5
2018	7	0
2019	10	3
2020	2	0
2021	8	4
2022	4	1
Total	102	23

International goals

Scores and results list Panama's goal tally first.

No.	Date	Venue	Opponent	Score	Result	Competition
1.	6 September 2006	Estadio Mateo Flores, Guatemala City, Guatemala	Guatemala	2–1	2–1	Friendly
2.	12 October 2010	Estadio Rommel Fernández, Panama City, Panama	Peru	1–0	1–0	Friendly
3.	7 July 2013	Rose Bowl, Pasadena, United States	Mexico	1–0	2–1	2013 CONCACAF Gold Cup
4.	7 July 2013	Rose Bowl, Pasadena, United States	Mexico	2–1	2–1	2013 CONCACAF Gold Cup
5.	11 July 2013	CenturyLink Field, Seattle, United States	Martinique	1–0	1–0	2013 CONCACAF Gold Cup
6.	20 July 2013	Georgia Dome, Atlanta, United States	Cuba	1–1	6–1	2013 CONCACAF Gold Cup
7.	20 July 2013	Georgia Dome, Atlanta, United States	Cuba	2–1	6–1	2013 CONCACAF Gold Cup
8.	10 September 2013	Estadio Tiburcio Carías Andino, Tegucigalpa, Honduras	Honduras	1–1	2–2	2014 FIFA World Cup qualification
9.	15 October 2013	Estadio Rommel Fernández, Panama City, Panama	United States	1–0	2–3	2014 FIFA World Cup qualification
10.	2 September 2016	Estadio Rommel Fernández, Panama City, Panama	Jamaica	1–0	2–0	2018 FIFA World Cup qualification
11.	12 July 2017	Raymond James Stadium, Tampa, United States	Nicaragua	2–1	2–1	2017 CONCACAF Gold Cup
12.	15 July 2017	FirstEnergy Stadium, Cleveland, United States	Martinique	3–0	3–0	2017 CONCACAF Gold Cup
13.	5 September 2017	Estadio Rommel Fernández, Panama City, Panama	Trinidad and Tobago	1–0	3–0	2018 FIFA World Cup qualification
14.	10 October 2017	Estadio Rommel Fernández, Panama City, Panama	Costa Rica	1–1	2–1	2018 FIFA World Cup qualification
15.	9 November 2017	Liebenauer Stadium, Graz, Austria	Iran	1–2	1–2	Friendly
16.	22 June 2019	FirstEnergy Stadium, Cleveland, United States	Guyana	4–1	4–2	2019 CONCACAF Gold Cup
17.	5 September 2019	Bermuda National Stadium, Hamilton, Bermuda	Bermuda	1–0	4–1	2019–20 CONCACAF Nations League A
18.	5 September 2019	Bermuda National Stadium, Hamilton, Bermuda	Bermuda	3–1	4–1	2019–20 CONCACAF Nations League A
19.	5 June 2021	Estadio Nacional, Panama City, Panama	Anguilla	4–0	13–0	2022 FIFA World Cup qualification
20.	5 June 2021	Estadio Nacional, Panama City, Panama	Anguilla	7–0	13–0	2022 FIFA World Cup qualification
21.	5 June 2021	Estadio Nacional, Panama City, Panama	Anguilla	9–0	13–0	2022 FIFA World Cup qualification
22.	5 June 2021	Estadio Nacional, Panama City, Panama	Anguilla	11–0	13–0	2022 FIFA World Cup qualification
23.	30 March 2022	Estadio Rommel Fernández, Panama City, Panama	Canada	1–0	1–0	2022 FIFA World Cup qualification
As of 30 March 2022

== Honours ==
Chepo

- Copa Rommel Fernández: 2003

La Equidad

- Copa Colombia: 2008

Zamora

- Venezuelan Primera División: 2013–14, 2016

Independiente Del Valle

- Copa Sudamericana: 2019

Panama

- CONCACAF Gold Cup runner-up: 2013; third place: 2015

Individual

- Copa Rommel Fernández Top scorer: 2003
- Primera A Top scorer: 2004, 2005
- ANAPROF Revelation player: 2005
- ANAPROF Top scorer: 2007 (A)
- Venezuelan Primera División Top scorer: 2012–13
- CONCACAF Gold Cup Top scorer: 2023

== See also ==
- List of men's footballers with 100 or more international caps
