= Patrick Cavelan =

French professional football manager

Personal information
- Date of birth: 24 November 1976 (age 49)
- Place of birth: France

Managerial career
- Years: Team
- 200x–2011: Golden Star
- 2011–2013: Martinique
- 2020–: Club Franciscain

Patrick Cavelan (born 24 November 1976) is a French professional football manager.

== Career ==
Until 2011 he was a coach of the Golden Star. Since 2011 until 2013 he coached the Martinique national football team.
