= Eddie Johnson (American soccer) =

American soccer player (born 1984)

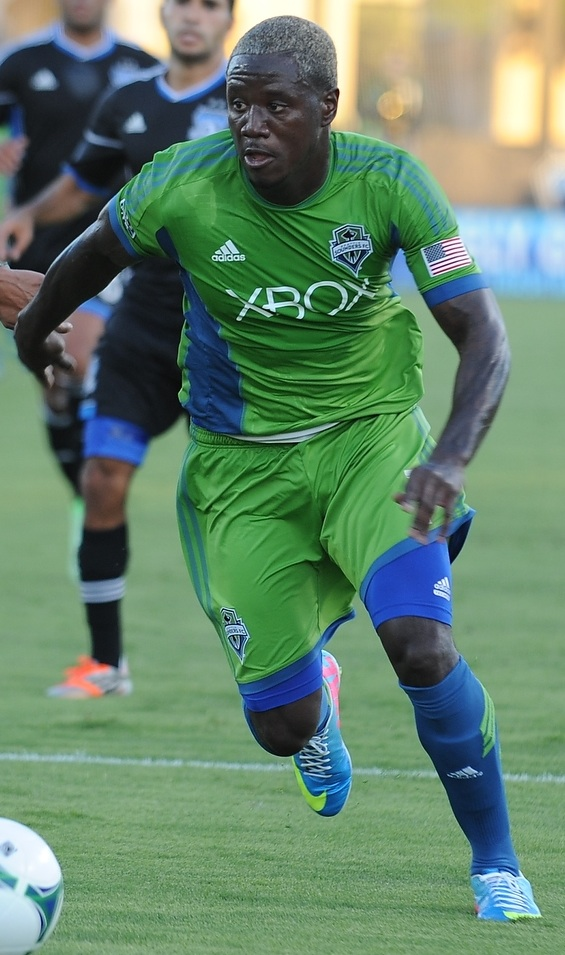
- Johnson playing for Seattle Sounders FC in 2013

Personal information
- Full name: Edward Abraham Johnson
- Date of birth: March 31, 1984 (age 42)
- Place of birth: Bunnell, Florida, United States
- Height: 6 ft 0 in (1.83 m)
- Position: Striker

Youth career
- 2000–2001: IMG Soccer Academy

Senior career*
Years	Team	Apps	(Gls)
2001–2005	FC Dallas	84	(24)
2006–2007	Kansas City Wizards	43	(17)
2008–2011	Fulham	19	(0)
2008–2009	→ Cardiff City (loan)	30	(2)
2010	→ Aris (loan)	14	(5)
2011	→ Preston North End (loan)	16	(0)
2012–2013	Seattle Sounders FC	49	(23)
2014–2015	D.C. United	26	(7)
Total		281	(78)

International career
2000–2001	United States U17	25	(23)
2002–2003	United States U20	21	(6)
2003–2004	United States U23	7	(2)
2004–2014	United States	63	(19)
Medal record
Representing United States
Winner	CONCACAF Gold Cup	2007
Winner	CONCACAF Gold Cup	2013
Men's Soccer
- * Club domestic league appearances and goals

Edward Abraham Johnson (born March 31, 1984) is an American former professional soccer player.

Johnson played the majority of his fourteen-year club career in the U.S. with FC Dallas, the Kansas City Wizards, Seattle Sounders FC, and D.C. United. Johnson also spent three and a half years with several European clubs.

Johnson also played for the United States men's national soccer team from 2004 to 2014, and was part of the U.S. squad for the 2006 FIFA World Cup. At the time of his retirement, Johnson ranked eighth on the list of goal-scorers with 19 goals for the U.S. national team.

== Club career ==
=== Youth career ===
Johnson became one of the youngest players to sign with Major League Soccer, and was drafted by Dallas Burn as a Project-40 player in the second round of the 2001 MLS SuperDraft. In his first three years in the league, he did not get much playing time, and was very inconsistent when he did get on the field. Johnson scored just seven goals for Dallas in those seasons, while missing time with U.S. youth national teams.

Johnson made his league debut on May 12, 2001, as an 87th-minute substitute for Bobby Rhine in a 4-0 victory over the Columbus Crew. He scored his first professional goal on July 4, a 95th minute equalizer against the New England Revolution. He made his first professional start on August 4 in a 5-1 loss to New England.

In January 2005, Benfica offered what would have been an MLS-record $5 million transfer fee for Johnson, but Johnson and the league both rejected the offer.

In May 2005, Johnson suffered an injury to the toes of his right foot that sidelined him until August of that year. After returning to MLS in August – he scored only five goals during the season – Johnson re-injured his toes in mid-September and was sidelined until January 2006.

=== Kansas City Wizards ===
With Dallas in salary cap trouble, Johnson was traded to the Kansas City Wizards on February 14, 2006, for two allocations. It was announced that Johnson would be training with Premier League club Reading during the MLS offseason, but he did not sign with the club.

In 2006 and early 2007, Johnson suffered a decline in form, scoring only twice in the 2006 MLS season and failing to make an impact with the national team. However, Johnson returned to form with the start of the 2007 MLS season, notching twelve goals and three assists in his first eleven games. On June 2, 2007, Johnson became the first player ever to score back to back hat-tricks in MLS play when he scored three goals against the New York Red Bulls, following a three-goal performance against the New England Revolution the previous week on May 26. Johnson was named MLS Comeback Player of the Year and team MVP for his efforts.

=== Premier League and Fulham ===
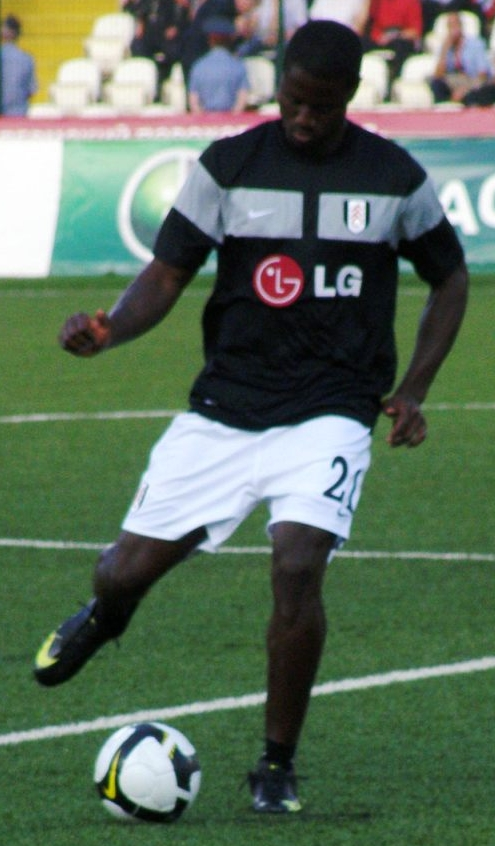
Eddie Johnson warming up for Fulham

In July 2007, Johnson saw increased speculation over a transfer to the Premier League. Derby County had been most vocal, with Derby manager Billy Davies confirming that he would explore the U.S. market. However, after MLS accepted a $6 million bid from Derby, Johnson reportedly nixed the deal as he preferred to finish his season in Kansas City. Johnson revealed his contract is structured to give him final say over whether he is purchased by fifteen designated clubs. Johnson left the national team camp in California on January 17, 2008; he completed a transfer to Fulham on January 23, 2008, signing a contract extending until the summer of 2011.

Johnson made his league debut on 23 February as a 76th minute substitute for Clint Dempsey in a 1-0 loss to West Ham United. He made his first league start on 1 March in a 3-0 loss to Manchester United.

=== Loan to Cardiff City ===
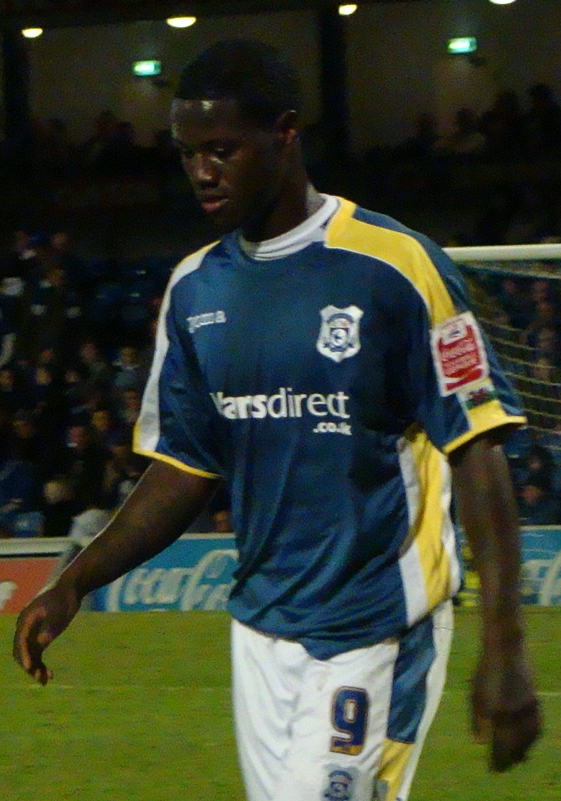
Eddie Johnson as a player of Cardiff City

He joined Championship side Cardiff City on loan for the 2008–09 season in August, making his debut for the club during a 2–1 victory over Milton Keynes Dons in the Football League Cup. He went on to make his league debut four days later as an eighty-fifth-minute substitute in a 0–0 draw with Sheffield United. He struggled to recover his goal-scoring form that he showed during his time in MLS.

However, he regained some of his form as the season progressed, and had a breakthrough week when he scored his first goal in English soccer on March 7, 2009, in a 3–0 victory against Doncaster Rovers. Four days later Johnson was named man of the match for his performance in Cardiff's 3–1 victory over Barnsley. A month later, when Cardiff hosted Derby County, Johnson scored his second goal of the season and added an own goal during injury time as the Bluebirds rolled to a 4–1 victory. Johnson's goal for Cardiff also meant that he was the last Cardiff City goalscorer under the Ninian Park floodlights.

Johnson returned to Fulham from Cardiff City for the 2009–10 season. He featured in the majority of Fulham's pre-season fixtures, scoring in a friendly at Australian club Melbourne Victory, was on the bench for Fulham's 3–0 victory over Vetra in the first leg of the third round of the Europa League, and came on as a late substitute in and recorded an assist in Fulham's 3–0 win in the second leg against Vetra.

=== Greece and loan to Aris ===
On December 31, 2009, Johnson joined Greek side Aris on loan for the remainder of the 2009–10 season. On January 13, 2010, Johnson made his first appearance for Aris, coming on as a 79th-minute substitute in a 2–0 victory over Asteras Tripolis in the round of 16 of the Greek Cup. He made his Greek Super League debut, appearing as a second-half substitute against PAS Giannina F.C., on January 17, 2010. Johnson scored two goals in their playoff win over Olympiacos. Johnson scored five goals for Aris and was one of the top goalscorers in the Super League play-offs with three goals.

=== Loan to Preston ===
On January 31, 2011, Johnson was sent out on loan to Championship club Preston North End. He scored his first goal against Reading on April 5; a flicked on header from a curling Keith Treacy cross. The goal was later given as an own goal.

On December 22, 2011, it was announced that Johnson had signed with Primera División de Mexico club Puebla. However, Johnson never officially signed a contract with the team and was released from camp after training with the team three or four times due to a difference in opinions between the coach, Juan Carlos Osorio, and the team's technical staff.

=== Seattle Sounders FC ===
Johnson signed with MLS on February 17, 2012, and was selected on February 18, 2012, by Montreal Impact via allocation process. He was immediately traded to Seattle Sounders FC in exchange for Mike Fucito and Lamar Neagle. He scored his first two goals for the Sounders in games against the Chicago Fire and the LA Galaxy. He was selected to the 2012 MLS All Star Team by coach Ben Olsen, eventually scoring the game-winning goal against Chelsea in a 3–2 victory. During the 2012 season, Johnson was selected as MLS Player of the Week two times. The first time in week 22, following a one-goal performance in a 4–0 win over the Los Angeles Galaxy. He received the honor a second time in week 27, following his two-goal showing in a 2–1 comeback victory against Chivas USA.

Johnson led the Sounders in goals scored during the 2012 MLS season, netting 14 total and finishing sixth in the league's Golden Boot race. Of the 14 total goals scored by Johnson, 9 came from headers, which led all players in MLS.

For his quality performance throughout the season, Johnson was named "Comeback Player of the Year" in MLS for the 2012 season. MLS Commissioner Don Garber said of Johnson receiving the award: "Eddie Johnson had a great resurgence with Seattle. Eddie joined our league when he was 17 years old and had one of his best years with us at 28. I still think he has a number of good years left in him." It was the second time Johnson received the award, previously winning in 2007 as a player with Kansas City.

Johnson scored the winning goal for the Sounders against Tigres de la UANL in the quarterfinal of the 2013 CONCACAF Champions League knockout stage. The 75th-minute goal put the Sounders ahead 3–2 on aggregate, and advanced the club to the semi-finals of the tournament. With the Sounders victory over Tigres, they became the first MLS side to eliminate a Mexican club in the history of the CONCACAF Champions League.

Towards the end of the 2013 MLS season, Johnson openly made pleas for an improved contract. Salary cap issues prevented Seattle from offering this, and so Johnson was cut from the team with the intention of his rights been traded.

=== D.C. United ===
Johnson was traded to D.C. United in exchange for allocation money on December 17, 2013. On May 17, 2014, Johnson scored his first goal for D.C. United in the 84th minute against the Montreal Impact. In March 2015, after an extended medical leave, it was reported that Johnson might need to retire due to a heart condition. On November 1, 2015, Johnson formally announced his retirement due to a diagnosed heart ailment.

== International career ==
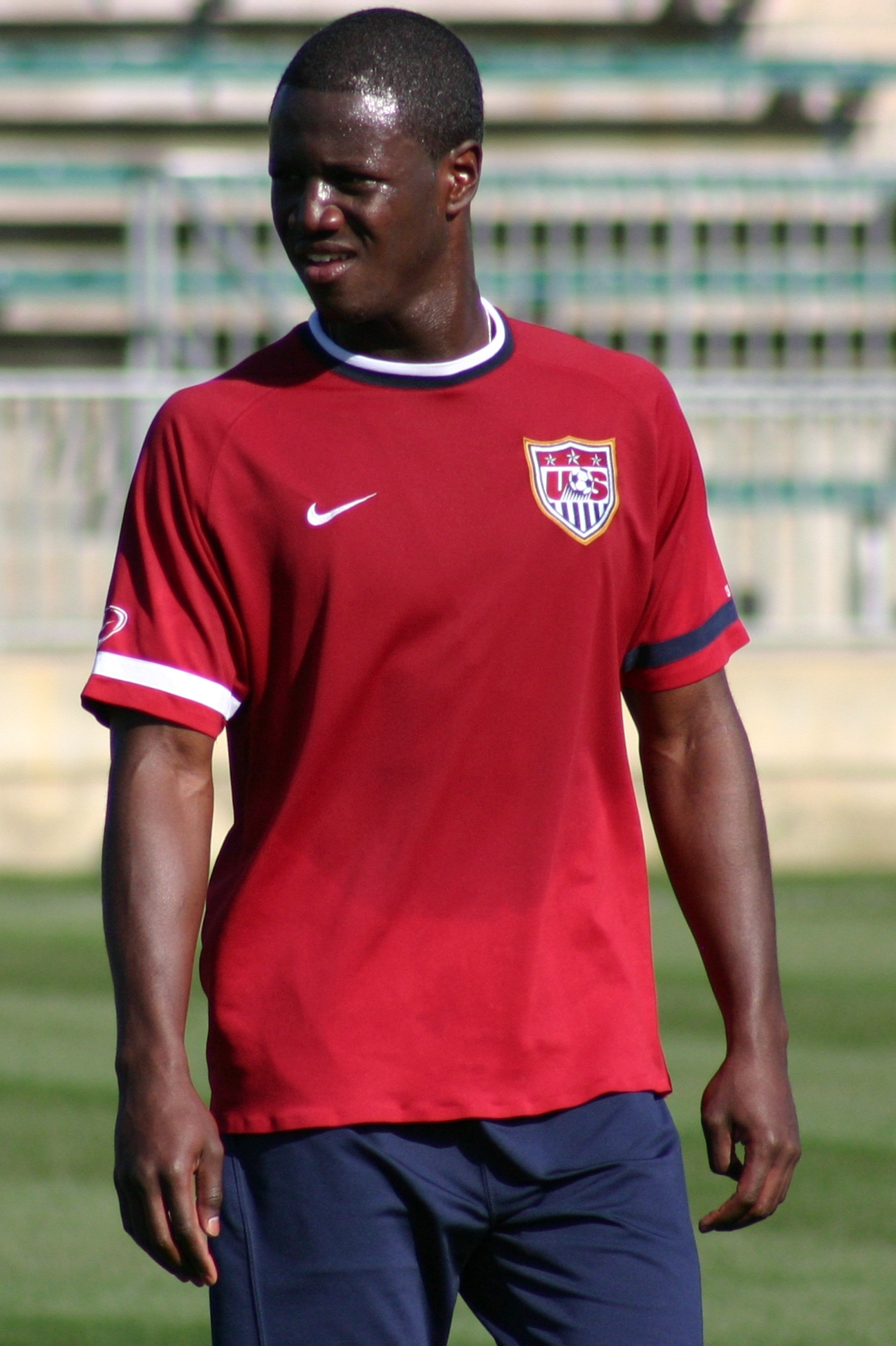
Johnson training with the United States national team

Johnson had success at the U-17 level, scoring 23 goals in 25 appearances and leading that team in scoring in both 2000 and 2001. This success continued at U-20 level, and in 2003 at the FIFA World Youth Championship in the United Arab Emirates he scored four goals, three from the penalty spot, and notched one assist to win the tournament's Golden Shoe as the top scorer.

Johnson received his first cap and scored his first goal for the senior United States team against El Salvador on October 9, 2004, becoming one of a small group of American players to get his first international goal in a World Cup qualifier. He then scored a hat-trick in his second appearance four days later, all within a seventeen-minute spree against Panama. On March 30, 2005, Johnson scored the game-winning goal in another qualifying match against Guatemala. He totaled seven goals in his first six World Cup qualifiers which placed him third on the U.S. all-time scoring list in World Cup qualifiers.

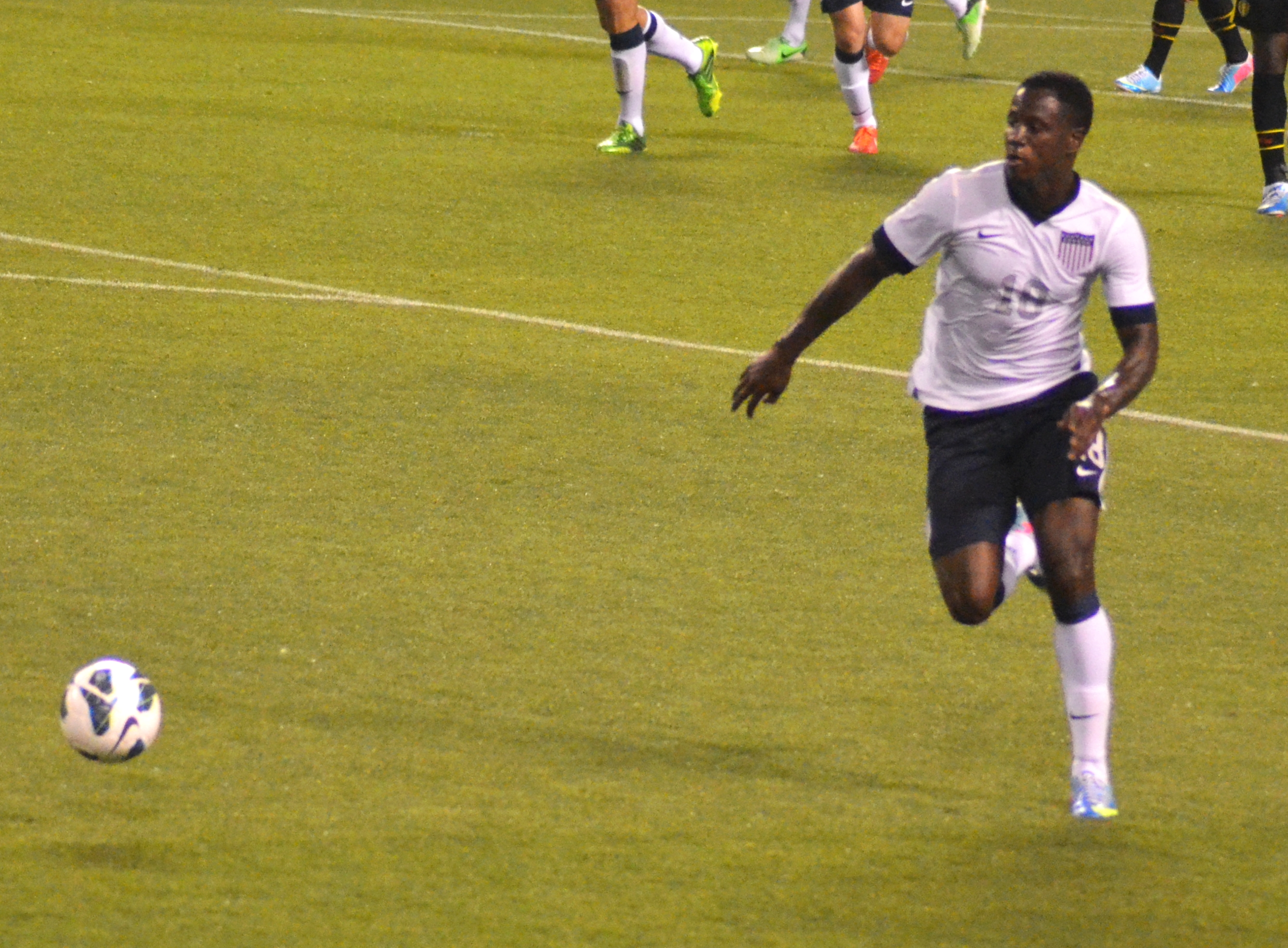
Johnson playing for the United States against Belgium in May 2013

Johnson appeared in two matches at the 2006 FIFA World Cup and also participated in the 2007 Copa América as well the 2007 Gold Cup. In the U.S.'s opening Copa América match against Argentina he earned and then converted a penalty kick to put the United States ahead 1–0 in a game they eventually lost 4–1.

On May 11, 2010, Johnson was named to the United States pre-2010 FIFA World Cup roster; he was ultimately cut before the team traveled to South Africa.

Johnson returned to the U.S. team for the 2014 World Cup qualifiers against Antigua and Barbuda and Guatemala. He scored both goals in the 2–1 victory over Antigua and Barbuda, with the winner coming in the 90th minute. He also assisted on Clint Dempsey's game-winning goal versus Guatemala.

Johnson scored the second goal for the United States against Panama during the World Cup Qualifying match held in Seattle, Washington on June 11, 2013. The goal was scored at CenturyLink Field, the home stadium of his pro club, Seattle Sounders FC. Johnson said of the goal, "It's a dream come true. To play in the U.S. jersey, first of all, is an honor, but to play in front of my fans that I play in front of week in and week out, I couldn’t have asked for a better feeling after the goal tonight." Johnson also scored the game winner in the World Cup Qualifier against Mexico in Columbus which qualified the USMNT for Brazil 2014.

== Post-playing career ==
Johnson is currently working for his USSF A license and has coached younger Americans such as Christian Pulisic.

== Personal life ==
Johnson became a Christian when he was 18. Johnson has spoken about his faith saying, "I began to think positively for the first time in years, and I became more patient. ... God showed me how to make the most of my life, both on and off the field. ... Through Jesus’ example, I have learned to forgive people and not hold grudges like I used to. That's the key to the rest of my life: faithfulness, both His and mine. I encourage you to make it the key to the rest of your life as well.

While growing up, Johnson considered Romário as his favorite player and watched him when he was nine-years-old and watched the 1994 FIFA World Cup in America. Johnson supports Manchester United.

== Career statistics ==
=== Club ===
As of December 14, 2014

Club performance			League		Cup		League Cup		Continental		Total	
Season	Club	League	Apps	Goals	Apps	Goals	Apps	Goals	Apps	Goals	Apps	Goals
United States			League		Open Cup		Playoffs		North America		Total	
2001	FC Dallas	Major League Soccer	10	2	1	0	0	0	0	0	11	2
2002	FC Dallas	Major League Soccer	11	2	3	0	3	0	0	0	17	2
2003	FC Dallas	Major League Soccer	22	3	1	1	0	0	0	0	23	4
2004	FC Dallas	Major League Soccer	26	12	2	2	0	0	0	0	28	14
2005	FC Dallas	Major League Soccer	15	5	1	1	0	0	0	0	16	6
2006	Kansas City Wizards	Major League Soccer	19	2	2	0	0	0	0	0	21	2
2007	Kansas City Wizards	Major League Soccer	24	15	0	0	3	0	0	0	27	15
England			League		FA Cup		League Cup		Europe		Total	
2007–08	Fulham	Premier League	6	0	0	0	0	0	0	0	6	0
2008–09	Fulham	Premier League	0	0	0	0	0	0	0	0	0	0
2008–09	Cardiff City (loan)	The Championship	30	2	1	0	2	0	0	0	33	2
2009–10	Fulham	Premier League	2	0	1	0	0	0	1	0	4	0
Greece			League		Greek Cup		League Cup		Europe		Total	
2009–10	Aris (loan)	Super League Greece	14	5	5	0	0	0	0	0	19	5
England			League		FA Cup		League Cup		Europe		Total	
2010–11	Fulham	Premier League	11	0	0	0	1	0	0	0	12	0
2010–11	Preston North End	The Championship	16	0	0	0	0	0	0	0	16	0
United States			League		Open Cup		Playoffs		North America		Total	
2012	Seattle Sounders FC	Major League Soccer	28	14	4	1	3	1	3	1	38	17
2013	Seattle Sounders FC	Major League Soccer	21	9	0	0	3	2	3	1	27	12
2014	D.C. United	Major League Soccer	26	7			2	0	2	2	30	9
Total	United States		202	71	14	5	14	3	8	4	238	83
Total	England		65	2	2	0	3	0	1	0	71	2
Total	Greece		14	5	5	0	0	0	0	0	19	5
Total	Career total		281	78	21	5	17	3	9	4	328	90

=== International ===
As of December 14, 2014.

National team	Year	Apps	Goals
United States
United States	2004	3	5
United States	2005	6	3
United States	2006	11	1
United States	2007	11	2
United States	2008	6	1
United States	2009	2	0
United States	2010	3	0
United States	2011	0	0
United States	2012	2	2
United States	2013	17	5
United States	2014	2	0
Total		63	19

International appearances and goals
#	Date	Venue	Opponent	Result^{†}	Competition	Goal
2004
1	October 9	Estadio Cuscatlán, San Salvador, El Salvador	El Salvador	2–0	2006 FIFA World Cup qualification	1 (1)
2	October 13	RFK Stadium, Washington, D.C., United States	Panama	6–0	2006 FIFA World Cup qualification	3 (4)
3	November 17	Columbus Crew Stadium, Columbus, United States	Jamaica	1–1	2006 FIFA World Cup qualification	1 (5)
2005
4	February 9	Queen's Park Oval, Port of Spain, Trinidad and Tobago	Trinidad and Tobago	2–1	2006 FIFA World Cup qualification	1 (6)
5	March 9	Titan Stadium, Fullerton, United States	Colombia	3–0	Friendly	
6	March 19	University Stadium, Albuquerque, United States	Honduras	1–0	Friendly	1 (7)
7	March 27	Estadio Azteca, Mexico City, Mexico	Mexico	1–2	2006 FIFA World Cup qualification	
8	March 30	Legion Field, Birmingham, United States	Guatemala	2–0	2006 FIFA World Cup qualification	1 (8)
9	September 7	Estadio Mateo Flores, Guatemala City, Guatemala	Guatemala	0–0	2006 FIFA World Cup qualification	
2006
10	January 22	Torero Stadium, San Diego, United States	Canada	0–0	Friendly	
11	February 10	AT&T Park, San Francisco, United States	Japan	3–2	Friendly	
12	February 19	Pizza Hut Park, Frisco, United States	Guatemala	4–0	Friendly	1 (9)
13	March 1	Fritz-Walter-Stadion, Kaiserslautern, Germany	Poland	1–0	Friendly	
14	March 22	Signal Iduna Park, Dortmund, Germany	Germany	1–4	Friendly	
15	April 11	SAS Soccer Park, Cary, United States	Jamaica	1–1	Friendly	
16	May 23	Nashville Coliseum, Nashville, United States	Morocco	0–1	Friendly	
17	May 26	Cleveland Browns Stadium, Cleveland, United States	Venezuela	2–0	Friendly	
18	May 28	Rentschler Field, East Hartford, United States	Latvia	1–0	Friendly	
19	June 12	Arena AufSchalke, Gelsenkirchen, Germany	Czech Republic	0–3	2006 FIFA World Cup	
20	June 22	FIFA WM-Stadion Nürnberg, Nürnberg, Germany	Ghana	1–2	2006 FIFA World Cup	
2007
21	January 20	Home Depot Center, Carson, United States	Denmark	3–1	Friendly	
22	February 7	University of Phoenix Stadium, Glendale, United States	Mexico	2–0	Friendly	
23	March 25	Raymond James Stadium, Tampa, United States	Ecuador	3–1	Friendly	
24	March 28	Pizza Hut Park, Frisco, United States	Guatemala	0–0	Friendly	
25	June 7	Home Depot Center, Carson, United States	Guatemala	1–0	2007 CONCACAF Gold Cup	
26	June 9	Home Depot Center, Carson, United States	Trinidad and Tobago	2–0	2007 CONCACAF Gold Cup	1 (10)
27	June 21	Soldier Field, Chicago, United States	Canada	2–1	2007 CONCACAF Gold Cup	
28	June 28	Estadio José Pachencho Romero, Maracaibo, Venezuela	Argentina	1–4	2007 Copa América	1 (11)
29	July 2	Estadio Agustín Tovar, Barinas, Venezuela	Paraguay	1–3	2007 Copa América	
30	July 5	Estadio Metropolitano de Lara, Barquisimeto, Venezuela	Colombia	0–1	2007 Copa América	
31	September 9	Soldier Field, Chicago, United States	Brazil	2–4	Friendly	
2008
32	March 26	Wisla Stadium, Kraków, Poland	Poland	3–0	Friendly	
33	May 28	Wembley Stadium, London, England	England	0–2	Friendly	
34	June 4	El Sardinero, Santander, Spain	Spain	0–1	Friendly	
35	June 7	Giants Stadium, East Rutherford, United States	Argentina	0–0	Friendly	
36	June 14	Home Depot Center, Carson, United States	Barbados	8–0	2010 FIFA World Cup qualification	1 (12)
37	September 10	Toyota Park, Bridgeview, United States	Trinidad and Tobago	3–0	2010 FIFA World Cup qualification	
2009
38	November 14	Tehelné pole, Bratislava, Slovakia	Slovakia	0–1	Friendly	
39	November 18	NRGi Park, Aarhus, Denmark	Denmark	1–3	Friendly	
2010
40	March 3	Amsterdam Arena, Amsterdam, Netherlands	Netherlands	1–2	Friendly	
41	May 25	Rentschler Field, East Hartford, United States	Czech Republic	2–4	Friendly	
42	October 12	PPL Park, Chester, United States	Colombia	0–0	Friendly	
2012
43	October 13	Sir Vivian Richards Stadium, North Sound, Antigua and Barbuda	Antigua and Barbuda	2–1	2014 FIFA World Cup qualification	2 (14)
44	October 16	Livestrong Sporting Park, Kansas City, United States	Guatemala	3–1	2014 FIFA World Cup qualification	
2013
45	January 29	BBVA Compass Stadium, Houston, United States	Canada	0–0	Friendly	
46	February 6	Estadio Olímpico Metropolitano, San Pedro Sula, Honduras	Honduras	1–2	2014 FIFA World Cup qualification	
47	March 22	Dick's Sporting Goods Park, Commerce City, United States	Costa Rica	1–0	2014 FIFA World Cup qualification	
48	March 26	Estadio Azteca, Mexico City, Mexico	Mexico	0–0	2014 FIFA World Cup qualification	
49	May 29	FirstEnergy Stadium, Cleveland, United States	Belgium	2–4	Friendly	
50	June 2	RFK Stadium, Washington, D.C., United States	Germany	4–3	Friendly	
51	June 7	Independence Park, Kingston, Jamaica	Jamaica	2–1	2014 FIFA World Cup qualification	
52	June 11	CenturyLink Field, Seattle, United States	Panama	2–0	2014 FIFA World Cup qualification	1 (15)
53	June 18	Rio Tinto Stadium, Sandy, United States	Honduras	1–0	2014 FIFA World Cup qualification	
54	July 21	M&T Bank Stadium, Baltimore, United States	El Salvador	5–1	2013 CONCACAF Gold Cup	1 (16)
55	July 24	Cowboys Stadium, Arlington, United States	Honduras	3–1	2013 CONCACAF Gold Cup	1 (17)
56	July 28	Soldier Field, Chicago, United States	Panama	1–0	2013 CONCACAF Gold Cup Final	
57	August 14	Asim Ferhatović Hase Stadium, Sarajevo, Bosnia and Herzegovina	Bosnia and Herzegovina	4–3	Friendly	1 (18)
58	September 6	Estadio Nacional, San José, Costa Rica	Costa Rica	1–3	2014 FIFA World Cup qualification	
59	September 10	Columbus Crew Stadium, Columbus, United States	Mexico	2–0	2014 FIFA World Cup qualification	1 (19)
60	November 15	Hampden Park, Glasgow, Scotland	Scotland	0–0	Friendly	
61	November 19	Ernst Happel Stadium, Vienna, Austria	Austria	0–1	Friendly	
2014
62	February 1	StubHub Center, Carson, United States	South Korea	2–0	Friendly	
63	April 2	University of Phoenix Stadium, Glendale, United States	Mexico	2–2	Friendly	
^{†}United States' goal tally first.

== Honors ==
United States

- CONCACAF Gold Cup: 2007, 2013

Individual

- MLS Comeback Player of the Year: 2007, 2012
- FIFA World Youth Championship Golden Boot: 2003
