= Brek Shea =

American soccer player

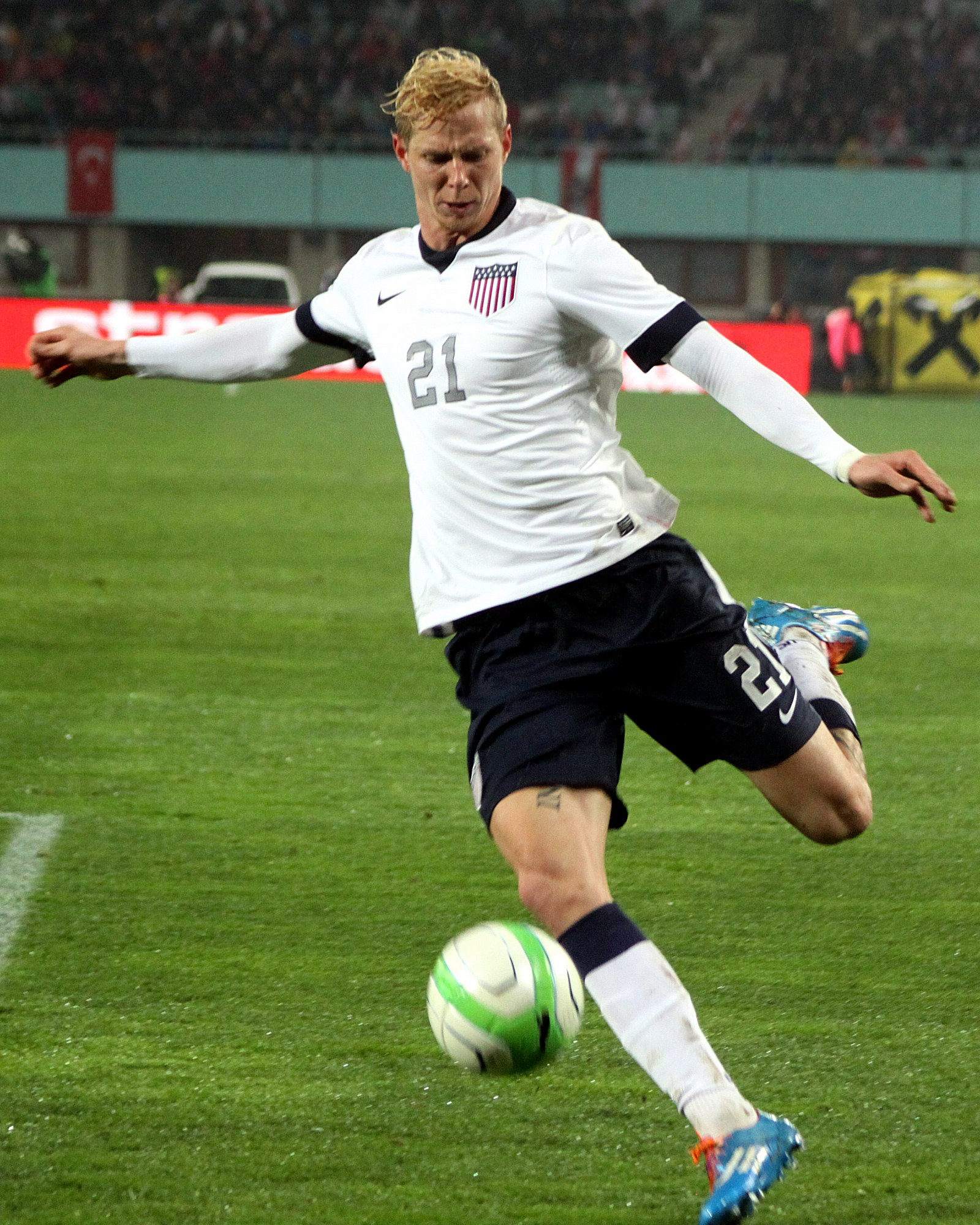
- Shea with the United States in 2013

Personal information
- Full name: Dane Brekken Shea
- Date of birth: February 28, 1990 (age 36)
- Place of birth: College Station, Texas, U.S.
- Height: 6 ft 3 in (1.91 m)
- Positions: Left midfielder; left-back

Youth career
- 2005: Texans SC
- 2005–2007: IMG Soccer Academy

Senior career*
Years	Team	Apps	(Gls)
2008–2012	FC Dallas	98	(19)
2013–2014	Stoke City	3	(0)
2014	→ Barnsley (loan)	8	(0)
2014	→ Birmingham City (loan)	6	(0)
2015–2016	Orlando City	46	(3)
2017–2018	Vancouver Whitecaps	53	(7)
2019	Atlanta United	19	(0)
2020–2022	Inter Miami	47	(6)
2022	Inter Miami II	1	(0)
Total		281	(35)

International career
2005–2007	United States U17	24	(18)
2007–2009	United States U20	24	(17)
2012	United States U23	3	(0)
2010–2015	United States	34	(4)
Medal record
Representing United States
Winner	CONCACAF Gold Cup	2013
Runner-up	CONCACAF U-20 Championship	2009
Men's Soccer
- * Club domestic league appearances and goals

Dane Brekken "Brek" Shea (born February 28, 1990) is an American former professional soccer player who played as a left midfielder or left-back.

Shea began his career with Major League Soccer team FC Dallas after playing in the IMG Academy. He made his debut during the 2008 season and helped Dallas reach the MLS Cup Playoffs in 2010 and 2011. In January 2013, Shea joined English Premier League side Stoke City for a fee of £2.5 million. Shea failed to make an impact at Stoke and after spending time on loan at Barnsley and Birmingham City he joined Orlando City SC in December 2014. Shea was traded to Vancouver Whitecaps FC in 2017. Shea was signed by Atlanta United FC as a free agent for the 2019 season.

== Early career ==
While in school in Texas, Shea won four consecutive state championships playing for the Texans SC youth soccer organization in Houston, Texas. He attended U.S. Soccer's youth residency program, and later went to train with Bolton Wanderers in England in October 2007.

== Club career ==
=== FC Dallas ===
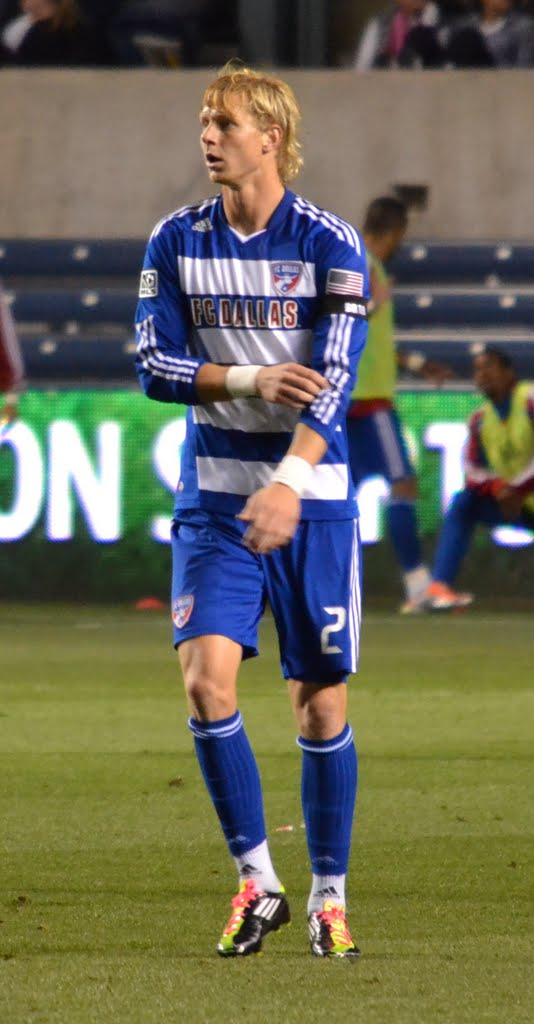
Brek Shea playing for FC Dallas

Shea did not play college soccer and instead turned professional straight out of high school. He was drafted 2nd overall by FC Dallas in the 2008 MLS SuperDraft and he signed a Generation Adidas contract. He made his MLS debut for Dallas on April 20, 2008, as a substitute against Chivas USA in the 86th minute. Brek appeared in five of the team's six international friendlies and made eight starts with the reserve team before he underwent season-ending surgery to repair a torn meniscus in his right knee on September 19, 2008. Shea earned his first professional start on May 23, 2009, in a match versus the Los Angeles Galaxy. Shea spent his first two seasons with the club playing as a utility man, including spells as a striker, a central midfielder and as a defender. He eventually settled in at left winger during the 2010 MLS season. Shea scored his first professional goal on May 15 against the Philadelphia Union.

During the 2010 Season, Shea finished seventh on the team in minutes played (1,797) and made a career high 25 regular season appearances, ending the season with five goals and four assists, as well as having 2 assists in four playoff games. Shea graduated from the MLS Generation Adidas program at the end of the 2010 season. After playing left midfield during a Generation Adidas trip to Spain, Shea started the 2011 season at center-back, with manager Schellas Hyndman saying he found Shea's talents better used there.

During a match against Vancouver Whitecaps FC David Ferreira came down with an injury and much of his scoring role was passed onto Shea. Coach Schellas Hyndman soon started playing Shea midfield, and he blossomed into a top player of the 2011 MLS season. Shea was named to the MLS Team of Week 11, 14, and 16 in the 2011 MLS season for his performances against Seattle Sounders FC, Houston Dynamo, Chivas USA, and Columbus Crew. Following Ferreira's injury he led FC Dallas to 10 wins (the first team in the 2011 MLS season to do so) led the club in goals, and as a result he was named to the MLS All-Star Game as a midfielder. As part of the events surrounding the All-Star Game, Shea and New York Red Bulls defender Tim Ream rang the closing bell at the New York Stock Exchange on July 22. However, Shea was unable to play in the game due to a CONCACAF Champions League match. During a match against Sporting Kansas City Brek Shea helped Dallas rally back from 2–0 down to win 3–2, with two crosses in the final two minutes, to Maicon Santos and Bobby Warshaw respectively. Following the end of the 2011 MLS campaign, where Shea was an MVP nominee. On November 10, 2011, it was announced that Shea would spend a month of his offseason training under manager Arsène Wenger at Arsenal.

Shea would have a disappointing follow up to his successful 2011 campaign, only netting three goals in the 2012 FC Dallas season mired by injury problems. It was announced in November 2012 that Shea would be out an estimated three months following surgery for the removal of a bone in his right foot. In January 2013 Shea joined English side Stoke City on a week-long trial. However, he failed to arrive in England after negotiations between MLS and Stoke broke down. On January 28, MLS accepted an improved offer from Stoke.

=== Stoke City ===
Shea joined English Premier League club Stoke City on January 31, 2013, for a fee of £2.5 million on a four-and-a-half-year contract. He made his debut for Stoke against Fulham on February 23. After the match Shea said he was glad to be playing again after his injury but admitted he was disappointed with his performance. Shea made one more substitute appearance before manager Tony Pulis ruled him out for the remainder of the 2012–13 season because his foot operation had affected his fitness. After scoring the winning goal in the 2013 CONCACAF Gold Cup Final, Shea joined up with the Stoke squad on their pre-season tour of the United States and played against the Philadelphia Union where he scored in a 2–0 victory. He also picked up a knee injury which saw him miss the start of the 2013–14 season.

Shea joined Championship club Barnsley on loan from Stoke on January 1, 2014, and made his debut against Birmingham City the same day. He played eight times for the Tykes before he was sent back to Stoke on March 10 after he was involved in a post-match confrontation, during which he made an offensive gesture towards Barnsley supporters, following a 5–0 defeat against Huddersfield Town.

Having played no competitive club soccer since returning to Stoke, Shea joined Championship club Birmingham City on September 11, 2014, on loan for three months. He went straight into the starting eleven for the next match, at home to Leeds United, and provided the pass from which Wes Thomas scored the opening goal. Shea lasted 67 minutes; the match finished 1–1. He played six times for Birmingham before returning to Stoke.

=== Orlando City ===
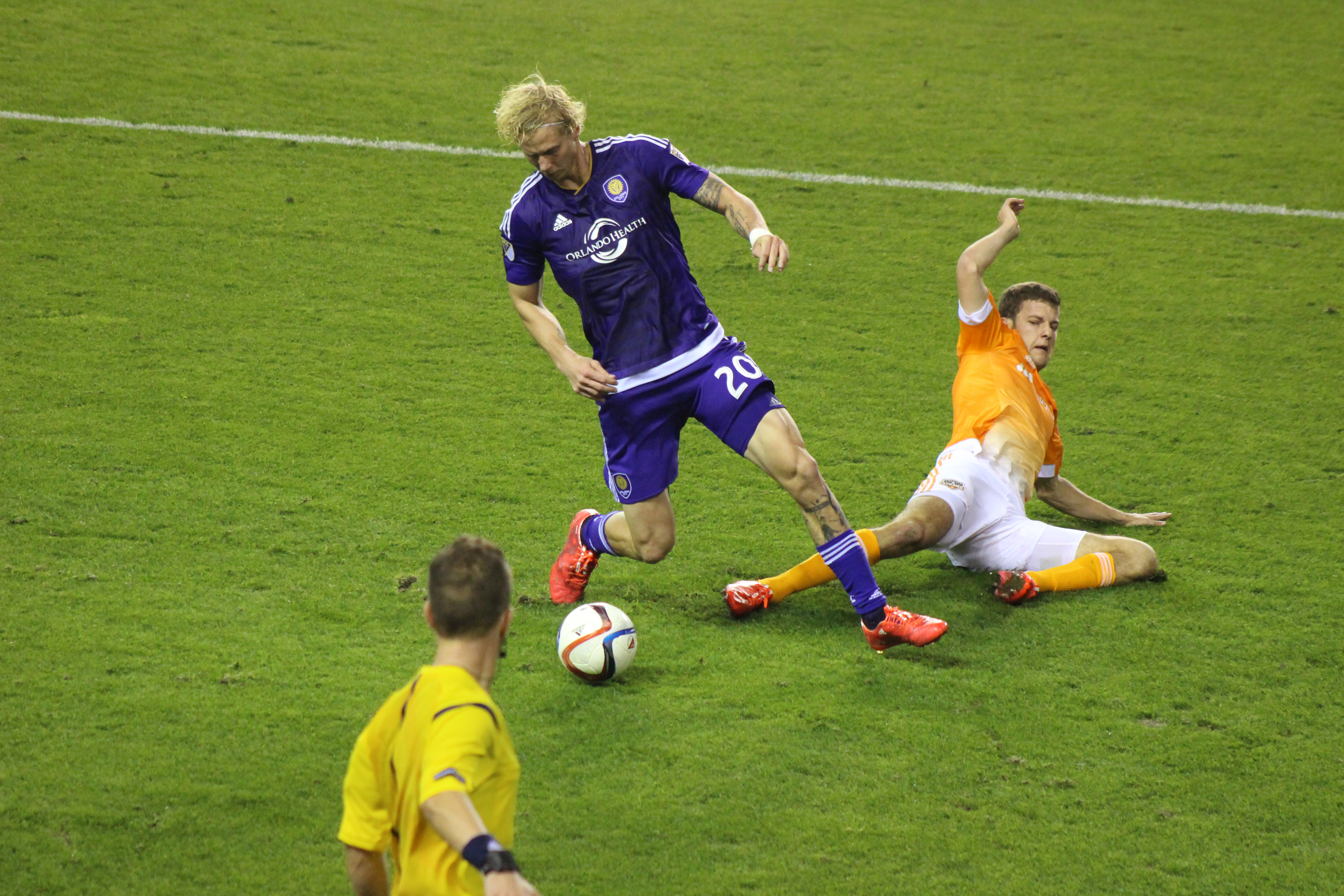
Shea playing against the Houston Dynamo during the 2015 season

On December 19, 2014, Shea returned to the United States, joining Major League Soccer side Orlando City SC, an expansion team looking for a veteran presence to guide them in their first MLS season.

On Wednesday February 25, 2015, Shea scored his first goal with Orlando City against the Charleston Battery at Blackbaud Stadium in a preseason match with a header assisted by Kakà. The game ended after only 28 minutes of play because of inclement weather. Shea scored his first MLS goal with Orlando against the Portland Timbers on April 3, 2016, after a one-two play with Kaká, scoring a left-footed curler to the far post.

During his tenure with Orlando, Brek often found himself playing left back. Shortly before new head coach Jason Kreis took over, Shea made consecutive appearances as a winger, a position that utilized his speed and height and a position that he felt more comfortable in.

=== Vancouver Whitecaps ===
On February 27, 2017, Shea joined Vancouver Whitecaps FC in an exchange deal with Orlando for Giles Barnes. The start of Shea's 2017 campaign was met with nagging injuries and he didn't get his first start until a 2–0 loss to Toronto FC on March 18, 2017. On April 5, 2017, Shea scored in the third minute of the second leg of the CONCACAF Champions League semifinal. Minutes later Shea would exit the game with a knee injury. Vancouver ended up conceding two late goals to fall 2–1 in Leg 2 and drop the series 4–1 on aggregate. Shea's injury kept him out of game action until April 5, 2017, where he was a second half substitution against Colorado Rapids. It was this game that Shea scored his first goal as a Whitecap. Shea's goal turned out to be the eventual game winner. He followed that performance by scoring another goal as a late game sub, in a 2–1 loss to Houston Dynamo.

Shea was released by Vancouver at the end of their 2018 season.

=== Atlanta United ===
Shea signed with Atlanta United FC ahead of the 2019 season.

=== Inter Miami ===
Shea initially trained and rehabilitated from injury with Miami's USL League One team Fort Lauderdale CF, however, on June 25, 2020, he signed with Inter Miami CF. Shea scored his first goal for the side—a tying goal, in the 65th minute—on September 12 in a 2–1 loss against Orlando City. He was out of contract at the end of the 2021 season.

On May 4, 2023, Shea announced his retirement from professional soccer alongside former teammate Geoff Cameron. The duo plan to participate in The Soccer Tournament, a pro–am seven-a-side tournament.

== International career ==
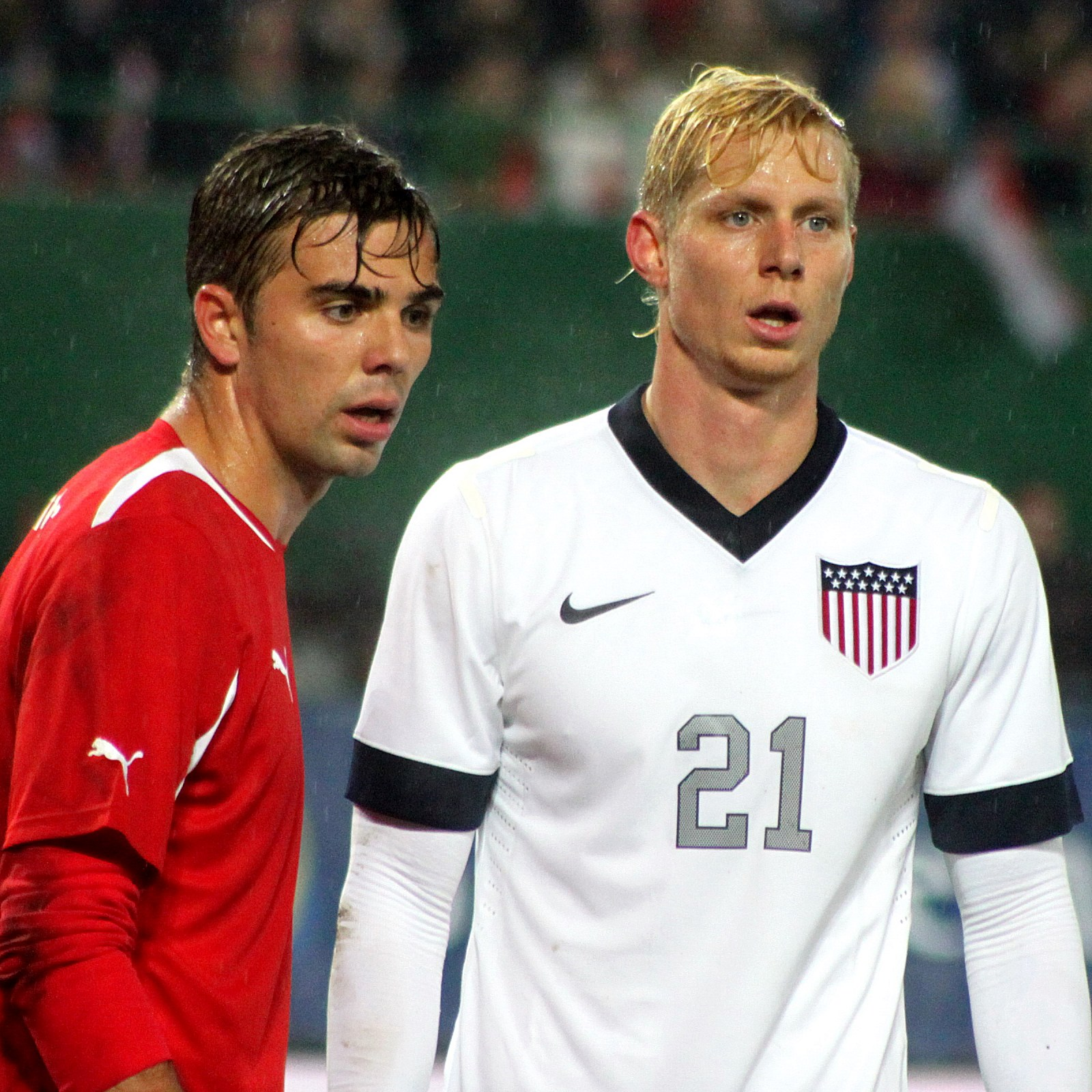
Brek Shea with U.S. national team

Shea was a member of the United States residency program in Bradenton, Florida, and played extensively for the Under-17 team during that time. He later moved on to the Under-20 national team, whom he has represented most recently at the 2009 CONCACAF U-20 Championship. He received his first call-up to the senior national team at the age of eighteen, when he was called in late for a second round World Cup qualifier on June 18, 2008, at Barbados.

In September 2010, he was called up for an October friendly against Colombia. Shea earned his first international cap playing the first half of the 0–0 draw and in the process became the first player born in the 1990s to make an appearance for the full United States national team.

Shea received his third call-up and his second cap when he joined Eric Alexander, Zach Loyd, and Ugo Ihemelu, making FC Dallas the most-represented MLS team at the January 2011 United States national team camp. Shea started the January 22, 2011 match against Chile, playing 60 minutes.

Under new United States national team head coach Jürgen Klinsmann, Shea was named as one of seven midfielders for a friendly match against Mexico on August 10, 2011, in Philadelphia. In the 60th minute, Shea came on as a substitute for Jermaine Jones and recorded his first international assist on the equalizing goal from Robbie Rogers.

After a six-month rough patch during his 2012 campaign, Shea made his return to the United States national team for a friendly against Mexico on August 15, 2012. Shea came on in the 78th minute as a substitute for Herculez Gomez. On July 16, 2013, Shea scored his first goal against Costa Rica in the 2013 CONCACAF Gold Cup, a low left footed shot to the corner of the net. It proved to be the winning goal, as the United States won 1–0. Shea then scored the winning goal in the final as the United States beat Panama 1–0.

== Personal life ==
Shea was born in College Station, Texas, the third son of Charles and Kirsten. He also has two younger sisters. Shea attended Brazos Christian School and the freshman year at Bryan High School in Bryan, Texas. He then moved to the U.S. Residency in Bradenton, Florida, where he graduated from Edison Academy.

During Shea's personal time he often paints. In 2011, ten of his abstract paintings raised nearly $10,000 at auction in Plano, Texas, in aid of the FC Dallas Foundation's support program for disadvantaged young people.

On September 23, 2015, Shea's long-time girlfriend, Carling, gave birth to their daughter, Phoenix Shea.

== Career statistics ==
=== Club ===
Appearances and goals by club, season and competition
Club	Season	League			National cup		League cup		Continental		Total	
Club	Season	Division	Apps	Goals	Apps	Goals	Apps	Goals	Apps	Goals	Apps	Goals
FC Dallas	2008	Major League Soccer	2	0	1	0	—		—		3	0
FC Dallas	2009	Major League Soccer	19	0	—		—		—		19	0
FC Dallas	2010	Major League Soccer	25	5	1	0	4	0	—		30	5
FC Dallas	2011	Major League Soccer	31	11	3	0	1	0	6	0	41	11
FC Dallas	2012	Major League Soccer	21	3	—		—		—		21	3
FC Dallas	Total		98	19	5	0	5	0	6	0	114	19
Stoke City	2012–13	Premier League	2	0	—		—		—		2	0
Stoke City	2013–14	Premier League	1	0	—		2	0	—		3	0
Stoke City	2014–15	Premier League	0	0	—		—		—		0	0
Stoke City	Total		3	0	—		2	0	—		5	0
Barnsley (loan)	2013–14	Championship	8	0	—		—		—		8	0
Birmingham City (loan)	2014–15	Championship	6	0	—		—		—		6	0
Orlando City SC	2015	Major League Soccer	19	0	—		—		—		19	0
Orlando City SC	2016	Major League Soccer	27	3	1	0	—		—		28	3
Orlando City SC	Total		46	3	1	0	—		—		47	3
Vancouver Whitecaps FC	2017	Major League Soccer	25	4	2	0	—		3	1	30	5
Vancouver Whitecaps FC	2018	Major League Soccer	28	3	4	1	3	1	—		35	5
Vancouver Whitecaps FC	Total		53	7	6	1	3	1	3	1	65	10
Atlanta United FC	2019	Major League Soccer	19	0	—		—		2	0	21	0
Inter Miami CF	2020	Major League Soccer	13	4	—		—		—		13	4
Inter Miami CF	2021	Major League Soccer	30	2	—		—		—		30	2
Inter Miami CF	2022	Major League Soccer	4	0	—		—		—		4	0
Inter Miami CF	Total		47	6	—		—		—		47	6
Inter Miami CF II	2022	MLS Next Pro	1	0	—		—		—		1	0
Career total			281	35	12	1	10	1	11	1	314	38

=== International ===
Appearances and goals by national team and year
National team	Year	Apps	Goals
United States
United States	2010	1	0
United States	2011	8	0
United States	2012	6	0
United States	2013	10	2
United States	2014	2	0
United States	2015	7	2
Total		34	4

Scores and results list USA's goal tally first, score column indicates score after each Shea goal.

List of international goals scored by Brek Shea
No.	Date	Venue	Opponent	Score	Result	Competition	Ref.
1	16 July 2013	Rentschler Field, East Hartford, United States	Costa Rica	1–0	1–0	2013 CONCACAF Gold Cup	
2	28 July 2013	Soldier Field, Chicago, United States	Panama	1–0	1–0	2013 CONCACAF Gold Cup	
3	29 January 2015	Estadio El Teniente, Rancagua, Chile	Chile	1–0	2–3	Friendly	
4	31 March 2015	Letzigrund, Zurich, Switzerland	Switzerland	1–0	1–1	Friendly	

== Honors ==
United States

- CONCACAF Gold Cup: 2013

Individual

- MLS All-Star: 2011
- MLS Best XI: 2011
