= Leonel Parris =

Panamanian footballer (born 1982)

Personal information
- Full name: Leonel Antonio Parris Mitre
- Date of birth: 13 June 1982 (age 44)
- Height: 1.66 m (5 ft 5 in)
- Position: Right-back

Team information
- Current team: Tauro

Senior career*
Years	Team	Apps	(Gls)
2006–2007	Plaza Amador		
2007–2008	Chorrillo		
2009–2014	Tauro	92+ (Note: Statistics unknown for the 2009 and 2011–12 seasons.)	(2+)
2014	Uniautónoma	3	(0)
2015–2016	Tauro	25	(0)
2016	Chorrillo	20	(0)
2016–2017	Atlético Veragüense	30	(0)
2017–2018	Chorrillo	11	(0)
2018	Alianza	5	(0)
Total		186+	(2+)

International career
2005–2015	Panama	29	(0)
- * Club domestic league appearances and goals

Leonel Antonio Parris Mitre (born 13 June 1982) is a Panamanian former professional footballer who played as a right-back.

== Club career ==
He played for Plaza Amador and Chorrillo before moving to Tauro in 2009.

In June 2014, he moved abroad to join Colombian side Uniautónoma, but he was released in January 2015.

== International career ==
Parris made his debut for Panama in a May 2005 friendly match against Venezuela and has, as of June 2015, earned a total of 25 caps, scoring no goals. He represented his country in 6 FIFA World Cup qualification matches and was a member of the squad at the 2013 CONCACAF Gold Cup where Panama finished runners-up.

== Honours ==
Panama

- CONCACAF Gold Cup runner-up: 2013
