= Wálter Quesada =

Costa Rican football referee

Wálter Enrique Quesada Cordero
- Full name: Wálter Enrique Quesada Cordero
- Born: 9 May 1970 (age 56); Costa Rica

Domestic
Years	League	Role

International
Years	League	Role
2001–2011	FIFA listed	Referee

Wálter Enrique Quesada Cordero (born 9 May 1970) is a Costa Rican retired football referee.

He has been a FIFA International referee since 2001.

During his career he was appointed for four CONCACAF Gold Cup tournaments where he took charge of a single group stage fixtures in 2005 (Mexico vs Jamaica), 2007 (Honduras vs Mexico) and 2009 (United States vs Haiti). In the 2011 edition he officiated another group stage match (Jamaica vs Guatemala) before being handed a quarterfinal between Panama and El Salvador.

Later in 2011 he was selected for his maiden Copa América.
