= Marcos Sánchez (footballer, born 1989) =

Panamanian footballer

Personal information
- Full name: Marcos Aníbal Sánchez Mullins
- Date of birth: 23 December 1989 (age 36)
- Place of birth: Panama City, Panama
- Height: 5 ft 8 in (1.73 m)
- Position: Midfielder

Senior career*
Years	Team	Apps	(Gls)
2010–2013	Tauro	66	(4)
2013	→ D.C. United (loan)	9	(0)
2014–2017	Deportivo Táchira	23	(0)
2015	→ Portuguesa (loan)	9	(0)
2018–2019	Tauro	86	(3)
2020	Sporting San Miguelito	15	(0)
2021	Árabe Unido	28	(1)

International career
2011–2019	Panama	40	(2)
- * Club domestic league appearances and goals

Marcos Aníbal Sánchez Mullins (born 23 December 1989) is a Panamanian former professional footballer played as a midfielder.

== Career ==
=== Club ===
Sánchez made his professional debut in 2010 with Panamanian club Tauro. While with Tauro he helped the club capture the Apertura 2010 and Clausura 2012 titles. Overall, Sánchez appeared in 66 matches with Tauro and scored four goals.

After an impressive preseason trial with D.C. United, Sánchez was signed by the American club on a year-long loan on 26 February 2013. However, Sánchez was released on 31 May 2013, and he will return to his old club Tauro. He moved abroad again to join Venezuelan side Deportivo Táchira in December 2013 and he returned to Táchira in summer 2015 after a loan spell at Portuguesa.

=== International ===
Sánchez made his debut for the senior squad on 15 January 2011 in a 2011 Copa Centroamericana match against Belize.

=== International goals ===
Scores and results list Panama's goal tally first.

#	Date	Venue	Opponent	Score	Result	Competition
1	11 January 2013	Estadio Rommel Fernández, Panama City, Panama	Guatemala	2–0	3–0	Friendly
2	23 January 2013	Estadio Nacional de Costa Rica, San José, Costa Rica	Honduras	1–0	1–1	2013 Copa Centroamericana

== Honours ==
Panama

- CONCACAF Gold Cup runner-up: 2013
