= Carlos Rodríguez (Panamanian footballer) =

Panamanian footballer (born 1990)

Personal information
- Full name: Carlos Gabriel Rodríguez Orantes
- Date of birth: 12 April 1990 (age 36)
- Place of birth: Panama
- Height: 1.75 m (5 ft 9 in)
- Position: Left back

Team information
- Current team: Costa del Este

Senior career*
Years	Team	Apps	(Gls)
2007–2011	Chepo	52	(4)
2008	→ Defensor (loan)	3	(0)
2011–2012	Tauro		
2012	FC Dallas	24	(1)
2013	Chepo	17	(1)
2014	Tauro	14	(0)
2014–2015	Fortaleza Soacha	14	(0)
2015–2017	San Francisco	54	(3)
2018–	Costa del Este	7	(0)

International career
2008–	Panama U23	6	(0)
2011–	Panama	26	(1)
- * Club domestic league appearances and goals as of 4 October 2018

Carlos Gabriel Rodríguez Orantes (born 12 April 1990) is a Panamanian football who plays as a left back for Costa del Este.

== Club career ==
He studied and graduated in Colegio Pureza de María. Carlos Rodríguez began his career with Chepo making his debut in the Liga Panameña de Fútbol during the 2007 season. In 2008 the promising fullback was sent on loan to Uruguay's Defensor Sporting and appeared in 3 league matches for the Montevideo club. Upon returning to Chepo he quickly established himself as a first team regular and had his best season in 2010/11 in which he made 29 appearances and scored 3 goals. As a result of his play with Chepo he was signed by one of Panama's top club Tauro at the conclusion of the season.

Rodríguez played for Tauro during the 2011 CONCACAF Champions League and drew the interest of fellow participant FC Dallas. On January 20, 2012, it was announced that Rodríguez had signed with FC Dallas.

Rodríguez was released by Dallas on November 19, 2012. After a season at Chepo, he returned to Tauro in January 2014, only to move abroad again in summer 2014 to play for Colombian side Fortaleza.

In July 2015 he joined San Francisco. He left the club at the end of 2017.

== International career ==
He was part of the Panama U-20 squad that participated in the 2007 FIFA U-20 World Cup in Canada. Rodríguez made 3 appearances for Panama's Under-23 squad during qualifying for the 2008 Olympics.

In 2011, he made his debut with Panama's full national team in an August friendly match against Bolivia. He appeared in two friendlies, earning caps against Paraguay on Sept. 2 and Costa Rica on Nov. 11. He has, as of 1 August 2015, earned a total of 26 caps, scoring 1 goal and represented his country at the 2013 CONCACAF Gold Cup.

=== International goals ===
Scores and results list Panama's goal tally first.

No	Date	Venue	Opponent	Score	Result	Competition
1.	20 July 2013	Georgia Dome, Atlanta, USA	Cuba	3–1	6–1	2013 CONCACAF Gold Cup

== Honours ==
Panama

- CONCACAF Gold Cup runner-up: 2013
