= Roberto Chen =

Panamanian footballer (born 1994)

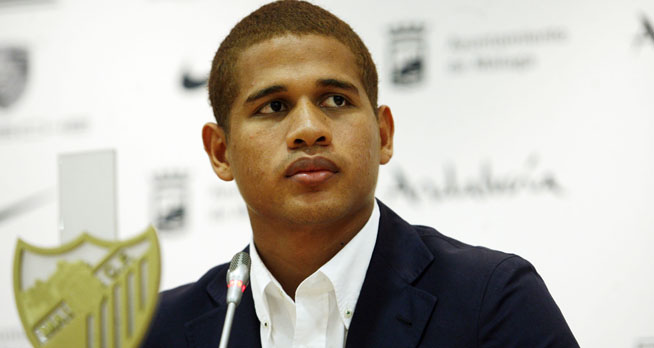
- Chen with Málaga in 2013

Personal information
- Full name: Roberto Leandro Chen Rodríguez
- Date of birth: 24 May 1994 (age 32)
- Place of birth: Isla Colón, Panama
- Height: 1.82 m (6 ft 0 in)
- Position: Centre back

Team information
- Current team: FAS

Youth career
- San Francisco

Senior career*
Years	Team	Apps	(Gls)
2010–2013	San Francisco	13	(1)
2013–2016	Málaga	2	(0)
2014	→ Zulte Waregem (loan)	2	(0)
2015–2016	→ Linense (loan)	3	(0)
2016	San Francisco	7	(0)
2016	Rionegro Águilas	5	(0)
2017–2020	Árabe Unido	82	(5)
2018	→ LD Alajuelense (loan)	1	(0)
2020	San Francisco	13	(1)
2021–	FAS	61	(1)

International career^{‡}
2010–2011	Panama U17	11	(0)
2010–2013	Panama U20	9	(1)
2015	Panama U23	3	(0)
2011–	Panama	23	(1)
- * Club domestic league appearances and goals as of 8 November 2021 ‡ National team caps and goals as of 3 May 2018

Roberto Leandro Chen Rodríguez (born 24 May 1994) is a Panamanian professional footballer who plays as a central defender for Salvadoran club FAS. He is also capable of playing on the right side and is good with the ball at his feet.

== Club career ==
Born in Isla Colón, Bocas del Toro, with Chinese heritage, Chen graduated from San Francisco's youth setup, and made his senior debuts in the 2010–11 campaign, aged only 17.

On 3 August 2013 Chen signed a three-year deal with La Liga side Málaga for a $500,000 fee. He made his debut for the Andalusians on the 17th, starting and being booked in a 0–1 loss at Valencia. He played his second match only on 26 October, starting in a 0–5 home loss against Celta de Vigo.

On 17 January 2014, Chen was loaned to Belgian Pro League side Zulte Waregem until the end of the season. He only appeared sparingly, and returned to Málaga in June.

On 22 August 2015 Chen was loaned to Segunda División B side Real Balompédica Linense, for a year.

On 27 July 2016, Chen signed a one-year contract with Categoria Primera A side Rionegro Águilas. He debuted in a 3–2 home loss against Atlético Bucaramanga.

== International career ==
After appearing with the Panama national under-17 and under-20 teams, Chen played his first match with the main squad on 3 September 2011, replacing Luis Moreno on the 56th of a 0–2 home loss against Paraguay. He was also named in the 23-man final squad for 2013 CONCACAF Gold Cup, appearing in all matches as Panama finished second.

On 10 September 2013 Chen scored his first international goal, netting the last of a 2–2 draw against Honduras.

=== International goals ===
Scores and results list Panama's goal tally first.

No	Date	Venue	Opponent	Score	Result	Competition
1.	10 September 2013	Estadio Tiburcio Carias Andino, Tegucigalpa, Honduras	Honduras	2–2	2–2	2014 FIFA World Cup qualification

== Honours ==
FAS

- Salvadoran Primera División: Clausura 2021

Panama

- CONCACAF Gold Cup runner-up: 2013
