= Jairo Jiménez =

Panamanian footballer (born 1993)

Personal information
- Full name: Jairo Joseth Jiménez Robles
- Date of birth: 7 January 1993 (age 33)
- Place of birth: Panama City, Panama
- Height: 1.82 m (6 ft 0 in)
- Positions: Right midfielder; second striker

Team information
- Current team: UD Universitario
- Number: 11

Youth career
- Chorrillo

Senior career*
Years	Team	Apps	(Gls)
2010–2013	Chorrillo	18	(0)
2013–2015	Elche B	37	(6)
2016–2017	UD Universitario	6	(0)
2017	Varzim	5	(0)
2018–	UD Universitario	10	(0)

International career^{‡}
- Panama U17
2011–2013	Panama U20	12	(3)
2013–	Panama	12	(1)
- * Club domestic league appearances and goals as of 29 May 2018 ‡ National team caps and goals as of 3 June 2015

Jairo Joseth Jiménez Robles (born 7 January 1993) is a Panamanian international footballer who plays for UD Universitario.

== Club career ==
He started his career at Chorrillo before moving abroad to join Spanish side Elche's B-squad.

== International career ==
Jiménez played at the 2011 FIFA U-20 World Cup in Colombia.

He made his senior debut for Panama in June 2013 friendly match against Peru and has, as of 10 June 2015, earned a total of 12 caps, scoring 1 goal. He represented his country in 4 FIFA World Cup qualification matches and played at the 2013 CONCACAF Gold Cup.

=== International goals ===
Scores and results list Panama's goal tally first.

No	Date	Venue	Opponent	Score	Result	Competition
1.	20 July 2013	Georgia Dome, Atlanta, USA	Cuba	5–1	6–1	2013 CONCACAF Gold Cup

== Honours ==
Panama

- CONCACAF Gold Cup runner-up: 2013
