= 1998 CONCACAF Gold Cup squads =

These are the squads for the 1998 CONCACAF Gold Cup.

== Group A ==
=== Brazil ===
Head coach: (Brazil) Mário Zagallo

No.	Pos.	Player	Date of birth (age)	Club
1	GK	Taffarel	8 May 1966 (aged 31)	(Brazilian Football Confederation) Atlético Mineiro
2	DF	Zé Maria	25 July 1973 (aged 24)	(Italian Football Federation) Parma
3	DF	Júnior Baiano	14 March 1970 (aged 27)	(Brazilian Football Confederation) Flamengo
4	DF	Gonçalves	22 February 1966 (aged 31)	(Brazilian Football Confederation) Botafogo
5	MF	Mauro Silva	12 January 1968 (aged 30)	(Royal Spanish Football Federation) Deportivo de La Coruña
6	DF	Júnior	20 June 1973 (aged 24)	(Brazilian Football Confederation) Palmeiras
7	FW	Edmundo	2 April 1971 (aged 26)	(Italian Football Federation) Fiorentina
8	MF	Flávio Conceição	12 June 1974 (aged 23)	(Royal Spanish Football Federation) Deportivo de La Coruña
9	MF	Zinho	17 June 1967 (aged 30)	(Brazilian Football Confederation) Palmeiras
10	FW	Denílson	24 August 1977 (aged 20)	(Brazilian Football Confederation) São Paulo
11	FW	Romário	29 January 1966 (aged 32)	(Brazilian Football Confederation) Flamengo
12	GK	Carlos Germano	14 August 1970 (aged 27)	(Brazilian Football Confederation) Vasco da Gama
13	DF	Russo	16 June 1976 (aged 21)	(Brazilian Football Confederation) Cruzeiro
14	DF	César	16 November 1975 (aged 22)	(Brazilian Football Confederation) Portuguesa
15	DF	Sylvinho	12 April 1974 (aged 23)	(Brazilian Football Confederation) Corinthians
16	MF	Doriva	28 May 1972 (aged 25)	(Portuguese Football Federation) Porto
17	MF	Marcos Assunção	25 July 1976 (aged 21)	(Brazilian Football Confederation) Flamengo
18	MF	Sérgio Manoel	2 March 1972 (aged 25)	(Brazilian Football Confederation) Grêmio
19	FW	Donizete	24 October 1968 (aged 29)	(Brazilian Football Confederation) Vasco da Gama
20	FW	Élber	23 July 1972 (aged 25)	(German Football Association) Bayern München

=== El Salvador ===
Head coach: (North Macedonia) Kiril Dojčinovski

No.	Pos.	Player	Date of birth (age)	Club
1	GK	Álvaro Misael Alfaro	6 January 1971 (aged 27)	(Salvadoran Football Federation) Luis Ángel Firpo
2	DF	José Roberto Hernández	3 August 1973 (aged 24)	(Salvadoran Football Federation) Águila
3	DF	Leonel Cárcamo	3 May 1965 (aged 32)	(Salvadoran Football Federation) Luis Ángel Firpo
4	DF	Nelson Rojas	1 February 1967 (aged 31)	(Salvadoran Football Federation) Alianza
5	MF	Washington de la Cruz	26 May 1964 (aged 33)	(Salvadoran Football Federation) Alianza
6	MF	Vladan Vićević	26 July 1967 (aged 30)	(Salvadoran Football Federation) Águila
7	MF	Willian Renderos	3 October 1971 (aged 26)	(Salvadoran Football Federation) Luis Ángel Firpo
8	MF	Carlos Castro Borja	1 August 1967 (aged 30)	(National Football Federation of Guatemala) Deportivo Zacapa
9	FW	Israel Castro	11 April 1975 (aged 22)	(Salvadoran Football Federation) Luis Ángel Firpo
10	FW	Jorge González	13 March 1958 (aged 39)	(Salvadoran Football Federation) FAS
11	FW	Ronald Cerritos	3 January 1975 (aged 23)	(United States Soccer Federation) San Jose Clash
12	MF	Mauricio Cienfuegos	12 February 1968 (aged 29)	(United States Soccer Federation) Los Angeles Galaxy
14	MF	José Alexander Amaya	4 January 1975 (aged 23)	(Salvadoran Football Federation) Águila
15	MF	Nelson Quintanilla	9 April 1973 (aged 24)	(Salvadoran Football Federation) Luis Ángel Firpo
16	DF	Reynaldo Argueta	11 May 1972 (aged 25)	(Salvadoran Football Federation) Águila
17	MF	Jorge Rodríguez	20 May 1971 (aged 26)	(United States Soccer Federation) Dallas Burn
18	MF	Waldir Guerra	2 April 1967 (aged 30)	(Salvadoran Football Federation) Águila
19	FW	Raúl Díaz Arce	1 February 1970 (aged 28)	(United States Soccer Federation) New England Revolution
20	DF	Wilfredo Iraheta	22 February 1967 (aged 30)	(Salvadoran Football Federation) FAS
21	DF	Guillermo Rivera	25 November 1969 (aged 28)	(Salvadoran Football Federation) FAS
22	GK	Santos Rivera	8 April 1974 (aged 23)	(Salvadoran Football Federation) ADET

=== Guatemala ===
Head coach: (Argentina) Miguel Ángel Brindisi

No.	Pos.	Player	Date of birth (age)	Club
1	GK	Edgar Estrada	16 November 1967 (aged 30)	(National Football Federation of Guatemala) Comunicaciones
2	DF	Erick Miranda	17 December 1971 (aged 26)	(National Football Federation of Guatemala) Comunicaciones
3	DF	Nelson Cáceres	12 October 1973 (aged 24)	(National Football Federation of Guatemala) Comunicaciones
4	DF	German Ruano	17 October 1971 (aged 26)	(National Football Federation of Guatemala) Municipal
5	MF	Jorge Pérez	4 February 1965 (aged 32)	(National Football Federation of Guatemala) Coban Imperial
6	DF	Iván León	3 March 1967 (aged 30)	(National Football Federation of Guatemala) Comunicaciones
7	FW	Juan Carlos Plata	1 January 1971 (aged 27)	(National Football Federation of Guatemala) Municipal
8	MF	Claudio Rojas	29 November 1973 (aged 24)	(National Football Federation of Guatemala) Comunicaciones
9	FW	Edwin Westphal	4 March 1966 (aged 31)	(National Football Federation of Guatemala) Comunicaciones
10	MF	Juan Manuel Funes	16 May 1966 (aged 31)	(National Football Federation of Guatemala) Comunicaciones
11	MF	Martín Machón	4 February 1973 (aged 24)	(United States Soccer Federation) Los Angeles Galaxy
12	GK	Hilton Moreira	26 September 1972 (aged 25)	(National Football Federation of Guatemala) Izabal Juventud Catolica
13	DF	Engelvert Herrera	11 May 1973 (aged 24)	(National Football Federation of Guatemala) Comunicaciones
14	MF	Julio Girón	2 March 1970 (aged 27)	(National Football Federation of Guatemala) Aurora
15	MF	Fabricio Benítez	11 June 1975 (aged 22)	(National Football Federation of Guatemala) Coban Imperial
16	MF	Guillermo Ramírez	26 March 1978 (aged 19)	(National Football Federation of Guatemala) Municipal
17	DF	Jairo Pérez	10 June 1976 (aged 21)	(National Football Federation of Guatemala) Municipal
18	FW	Víctor Gómez	5 October 1969 (aged 28)	(National Football Federation of Guatemala) Aurora
19	MF	Édgar Valencia	31 March 1971 (aged 26)	(National Football Federation of Guatemala) Comunicaciones
20	GK	Jorge Ovando	1 April 1976 (aged 21)	(National Football Federation of Guatemala) Municipal

=== Jamaica ===
Head coach: (Brazil) René Simoes

No.	Pos.	Player	Date of birth (age)	Club
1	GK	Warren Barrett	7 September 1970 (aged 27)	(Jamaica Football Federation) Violet Kickers
2	DF	Stephen Malcolm	2 May 1970 (aged 27)	(Jamaica Football Federation) Seba United
3	DF	Christopher Dawes	31 May 1974 (aged 23)	(Jamaica Football Federation) Galaxy FC
4	DF	Linval Dixon	14 September 1971 (aged 26)	(Jamaica Football Federation) Hazard United
5	DF	Ian Goodison	21 November 1972 (aged 25)	(Jamaica Football Federation) Olympic Gardens
6	MF	Fitzroy Simpson	26 February 1970 (aged 27)	(The Football Association) Portsmouth
7	MF	Peter Cargill	2 March 1964 (aged 33)	(Jamaica Football Federation) Harbour View
8	FW	Marcus Gayle	27 September 1970 (aged 27)	(The Football Association) Wimbledon
9	MF	Andy Williams	23 November 1977 (aged 20)	(Jamaica Football Federation) Real Mona
11	MF	Theodore Whitmore	5 August 1972 (aged 25)	(Jamaica Football Federation) Seba United
13	GK	Aaron Lawrence	11 August 1970 (aged 27)	(Jamaica Football Federation) Reno
14	DF	Gregory Messam	24 July 1973 (aged 24)	(Jamaica Football Federation) Harbour View
17	FW	Onandi Lowe	2 December 1974 (aged 23)	(Jamaica Football Federation) Waterhouse
18	FW	Deon Burton	25 October 1976 (aged 21)	(The Football Association) Derby County
19	DF	Frank Sinclair	3 December 1971 (aged 26)	(The Football Association) Chelsea
20	DF	Clifton Waugh	10 September 1972 (aged 25)	(Jamaica Football Federation) Olympic Gardens
21	DF	Durrant Brown	8 July 1964 (aged 33)	(Jamaica Football Federation) Wadadah
22	FW	Paul Hall	3 July 1972 (aged 25)	(The Football Association) Portsmouth
24	MF	Ricardo Gardner	25 September 1978 (aged 19)	(Jamaica Football Federation) Harbour View
25	MF	Winston Griffiths	12 September 1978 (aged 19)	(United States Soccer Federation) Rhode Island Rams

== Group B ==
=== Honduras ===
Head coach: (Peru) Miguel Company

No.	Pos.	Player	Date of birth (age)	Club
1	GK	Milton Flores	5 December 1974 (aged 23)	(National Autonomous Federation of Football of Honduras) Real España
2	DF	Merlyn Membreño	24 January 1972 (aged 26)	(National Autonomous Federation of Football of Honduras) Olimpia
3	DF	Arnold Cruz	22 December 1970 (aged 27)	(United States Soccer Federation) San Jose Clash
4	DF	Hernaín Arzú	13 December 1967 (aged 30)	(National Autonomous Federation of Football of Honduras) Motagua
5	DF	César Clother	9 December 1973 (aged 24)	(National Autonomous Federation of Football of Honduras) Real España
6	DF	Nigel Zúniga	9 June 1971 (aged 26)	(National Autonomous Federation of Football of Honduras) Motagua
7	MF	Robel Bernárdez	8 June 1972 (aged 25)	(National Autonomous Federation of Football of Honduras) Platense
8	FW	Alex Pineda Chacon	19 December 1969 (aged 28)	(National Autonomous Federation of Football of Honduras) Olimpia
9	FW	Carlos Alberto Pavón	9 October 1973 (aged 24)	(Mexican Football Federation) Necaxa
10	MF	Christian Santamaría	20 December 1972 (aged 25)	(National Autonomous Federation of Football of Honduras) Olimpia
11	FW	Wilmer Velásquez	28 April 1972 (aged 25)	(National Autonomous Federation of Football of Honduras) Olimpia
13	DF	Basilio Zapata	9 January 1970 (aged 28)	(National Autonomous Federation of Football of Honduras) Marathón
15	DF	Jorge Samuel Caballero	24 December 1974 (aged 23)	(National Autonomous Federation of Football of Honduras) Olimpia
17	MF	Camilo Bonilla	30 September 1971 (aged 26)	(National Autonomous Federation of Football of Honduras) Real España
18	FW	Jairo Martínez	14 May 1978 (aged 19)	(National Autonomous Federation of Football of Honduras) Motagua
19	FW	Presley Carson	20 July 1968 (aged 29)	(National Autonomous Federation of Football of Honduras) Motagua
20	MF	Amado Guevara	2 May 1976 (aged 21)	(National Autonomous Federation of Football of Honduras) Motagua
28	GK	Noel Valladares	3 May 1977 (aged 20)	(National Autonomous Federation of Football of Honduras) Motagua

=== Mexico ===
Head coach: (Mexico) Manuel Lapuente

No.	Pos.	Player	Date of birth (age)	Club
1	GK	Óscar Pérez	1 February 1973 (aged 25)	(Mexican Football Federation) Cruz Azul
2	DF	Claudio Suárez	17 December 1968 (aged 29)	(Mexican Football Federation) Guadalajara
3	DF	Gabriel de Anda	5 June 1971 (aged 26)	(Mexican Football Federation) Santos Laguna
4	MF	Germán Villa	2 April 1973 (aged 24)	(Mexican Football Federation) Club América
5	DF	Duilio Davino	21 March 1976 (aged 21)	(Mexican Football Federation) Club América
6	MF	Raúl Lara	28 February 1973 (aged 24)	(Mexican Football Federation) Club América
7	MF	Ramón Ramírez	5 December 1969 (aged 28)	(Mexican Football Federation) Guadalajara
8	MF	Braulio Luna	8 September 1974 (aged 23)	(Mexican Football Federation) Pumas UNAM
9	FW	Enrique Alfaro	11 December 1974 (aged 23)	(Mexican Football Federation) Toluca
10	MF	Javier Lozano	9 February 1972 (aged 26)	(Mexican Football Federation) Tigres UANL
11	FW	Cuauhtémoc Blanco	17 January 1973 (aged 29)	(Mexican Football Federation) Necaxa
12	GK	Ricardo Martínez	7 April 1966 (aged 31)	(Mexican Football Federation) Monarcas Morelia
13	MF	Pável Pardo	26 July 1976 (aged 21)	(Mexican Football Federation) Atlas
14	MF	Roberto Medina	16 March 1968 (aged 29)	(Mexican Football Federation) León
15	FW	Luis Hernández	22 December 1968 (aged 29)	(Mexican Football Federation) Necaxa
16	DF	Héctor López	7 June 1971 (aged 26)	(Mexican Football Federation) Atlas
17	FW	Francisco Palencia	28 April 1973 (aged 24)	(Mexican Football Federation) Cruz Azul
18	DF	Salvador Carmona	22 August 1975 (aged 22)	(Mexican Football Federation) Toluca
19	MF	Sigifredo Mercado	21 December 1968 (aged 29)	(Mexican Football Federation) León
20	FW	Emilio Mora	7 March 1978 (aged 19)	(Mexican Football Federation) Monarcas Morelia

=== Trinidad and Tobago ===
Head coach: (Trinidad and Tobago) Bertille St. Clair

No.	Pos.	Player	Date of birth (age)	Club
1	GK	Ross Russell	18 December 1967 (aged 30)	(Trinidad and Tobago Football Association) Defence Force
2	DF	Avery John	18 June 1975 (aged 22)	(United States Soccer Federation) American Eagles
3	MF	Sherwyn Julien	27 July 1970 (aged 27)	(Trinidad and Tobago Football Association) Joe Public
4	DF	Marvin Andrews	22 December 1975 (aged 22)	(Scottish Football Association) Raith Rovers
5	MF	Anthony Rougier	17 July 1971 (aged 26)	(Scottish Football Association) Hibernian
6	DF	Shurland David	19 August 1974 (aged 23)	(Trinidad and Tobago Football Association) Joe Public
7	FW	Clint Marcelle	9 November 1968 (aged 29)	(The Football Association) Barnsley
8	MF	Stokely Mason	24 October 1975 (aged 22)	(Trinidad and Tobago Football Association) Joe Public
9	FW	Peter Prosper	11 November 1969 (aged 28)	(Lebanese Football Association) Al Ansar
10	MF	Lyndon Andrews	20 January 1976 (aged 22)	(Trinidad and Tobago Football Association) Joe Public
11	FW	Jerren Nixon	25 June 1973 (aged 24)	(Swiss Football Association) Zurich
12	MF	David Nakhid	15 May 1964 (aged 33)	(United States Soccer Federation) New England Revolution
13	DF	Ansil Elcock	17 March 1969 (aged 28)	(United States Soccer Federation) Columbus Crew
14	FW	Stern John	30 November 1976 (aged 21)	(United States Soccer Federation) Columbus Crew
15	FW	Gary Glasgow	13 May 1976 (aged 21)	(United States Soccer Federation) New Orleans Storm
16	MF	Colvin Hutchinson	5 June 1969 (aged 28)	(Trinidad and Tobago Football Association)
17	MF	Dale Saunders	9 November 1973 (aged 24)	(Trinidad and Tobago Football Association) San Juan Jabloteh
20	GK	Clayton Ince	13 July 1972 (aged 25)	(Trinidad and Tobago Football Association) Defence Force

== Group C ==
=== Costa Rica ===
Head coach: (Costa Rica) Rolando Villalobos

No.	Pos.	Player	Date of birth (age)	Club
1	GK	Erick Lonnis	9 September 1965 (aged 32)	(Costa Rican Football Federation) Saprissa
2	DF	Harold Wallace	7 September 1975 (aged 22)	(Costa Rican Football Federation) Alajuelense
3	DF	Luis Marín	10 August 1974 (aged 23)	(Costa Rican Football Federation) Alajuelense
4	DF	Alexander Madrigal	6 May 1972 (aged 25)	(Costa Rican Football Federation) Alajuelense
5	MF	Luis Diego Arnáez	6 November 1967 (aged 30)	(Costa Rican Football Federation) Alajuelense
6	MF	Wílmer López	3 August 1971 (aged 26)	(Costa Rican Football Federation) Alajuelense
7	FW	Allan Oviedo	8 November 1970 (aged 27)	(Mexican Football Federation) Unión de Curtidores
8	MF	Joaquín Guillén	12 January 1969 (aged 29)	(Costa Rican Football Federation) Alajuelense
9	FW	Paulo Wanchope	31 July 1976 (aged 21)	(The Football Association) Derby County
10	MF	Roy Myers	13 April 1969 (aged 28)	(Costa Rican Football Federation) Saprissa
11	FW	Jewison Bennett	2 November 1976 (aged 21)	(National Football Federation of Guatemala) Comunicaciones
12	DF	Richard Mahoney		(Costa Rican Football Federation) Belén
13	DF	Alfredo Morales Cháves	16 September 1977 (aged 20)	(Costa Rican Football Federation) Municipal Goicoechea
14	MF	Floyd Guthrie	14 March 1966 (aged 31)	(National Football Federation of Guatemala) Comunicaciones
15	DF	Jervis Drummond	8 September 1976 (aged 21)	(Costa Rican Football Federation) Saprissa
16	FW	Bernard Mullins Campbell	5 December 1973 (aged 24)	(Costa Rican Football Federation) Cartaginés
17	MF	Carlos Rodríguez Marín	8 August 1976 (aged 21)	(Costa Rican Football Federation) Herediano
18	MF	Austin Berry	5 April 1971 (aged 26)	(Costa Rican Football Federation) Alajuelense
19	DF	Mauricio Wright	20 December 1970 (aged 27)	(Costa Rican Football Federation) Saprissa
20	GK	Ricardo González	6 March 1974 (aged 23)	(Costa Rican Football Federation) Alajuelense

=== Cuba ===
Head coach: (Cuba) William Bennett

No.	Pos.	Player	Date of birth (age)	Club
1	GK	Alexis Revé Aviles	17 November 1972 (aged 25)	(Football Association of Cuba) Villa Clara
2	DF	Juan Carlos Llorente	24 February 1969 (aged 28)	(Football Association of Cuba) Cienfuegos
3	DF	Mario Pedraza	18 July 1973 (aged 24)	(Football Association of Cuba) Cienfuegos
4	MF	Khadafi Gou Gomez	15 April 1977 (aged 20)	(Football Association of Cuba) Matanzas
5	DF	Alexander Cruzata	26 July 1974 (aged 23)	(Football Association of Cuba) Holguin
7	MF	Omar Montero Reynaldo	2 December 1969 (aged 28)	(Football Association of Cuba) Holguin
8	MF	Tobio Mora	22 August 1971 (aged 26)	(Football Association of Cuba) Ciego de Ávila
9	MF	Lázaro Darcourt Martinez	25 April 1971 (aged 26)	(Football Association of Cuba) Pinar del Río
10	MF	Manuel Bobadilla Gonzalez	21 June 1970 (aged 27)	(Football Association of Cuba) Ciudad Habana
11	FW	Lester Moré Henningham	15 July 1978 (aged 19)	(Football Association of Cuba) Ciego de Ávila
12	GK	Lázaro Sánchez	14 December 1974 (aged 23)	(Football Association of Cuba) Pinar del Río
13	DF	Yomber Aguado	12 January 1972 (aged 26)	(Football Association of Cuba) Pinar del Río
14	MF	Ariel Álvarez	9 May 1973 (aged 24)	(Football Association of Cuba) Villa Clara
15	FW	Osmín Hernández	27 June 1970 (aged 27)	(Football Association of Cuba) Pinar del Río
16	FW	Eduardo Sebrango Rodriguez	13 April 1973 (aged 24)	(Football Association of Cuba) Sancti Spiritus
18	DF	Israel Blake Cantero	9 May 1967 (aged 30)	(Football Association of Cuba) Cienfuegos
19	DF	Alexander Driggs	18 October 1973 (aged 24)	(Football Association of Cuba) Holguin
20	FW	Luis Martén	10 August 1974 (aged 23)	(Football Association of Cuba) Santiago de Cuba

=== United States ===
Head coach: (United States) Steve Sampson

No.	Pos.	Player	Date of birth (age)	Club
1	GK	Brad Friedel	18 May 1971 (aged 26)	(The Football Association) Liverpool
2	DF	Frankie Hejduk	5 August 1974 (aged 23)	(United States Soccer Federation) Tampa Bay Mutiny
3	DF	Eddie Pope	24 December 1974 (aged 23)	(United States Soccer Federation) D.C. United
4	DF	Mike Burns	14 September 1970 (aged 27)	(United States Soccer Federation) New England Revolution
5	DF	Thomas Dooley	12 May 1961 (aged 36)	(United States Soccer Federation) Columbus Crew
6	MF	John Harkes	8 March 1974 (aged 23)	(United States Soccer Federation) D.C. United
7	FW	Roy Wegerle	19 March 1964 (aged 33)	(United States Soccer Federation) D.C. United
9	FW	Joe-Max Moore	23 February 1971 (aged 26)	(United States Soccer Federation) New England Revolution
11	FW	Eric Wynalda	9 June 1969 (aged 28)	(United States Soccer Federation) San Jose Clash
12	DF	Jeff Agoos	2 May 1968 (aged 29)	(United States Soccer Federation) D.C. United
13	MF	Cobi Jones	16 June 1970 (aged 27)	(United States Soccer Federation) LA Galaxy
14	FW	Preki Radosavljevic	24 June 1963 (aged 34)	(United States Soccer Federation) Kansas City Wizards
15	FW	Roy Lassiter	6 March 1969 (aged 28)	(United States Soccer Federation) Tampa Bay Mutiny
16	DF	Brian Dunseth	2 March 1977 (aged 20)	(United States Soccer Federation) New England Revolution
17	DF	Marcelo Balboa	8 August 1967 (aged 30)	(United States Soccer Federation) Colorado Rapids
18	GK	Kasey Keller	29 November 1969 (aged 28)	(The Football Association) Leicester City
19	MF	Chris Henderson	11 December 1970 (aged 27)	(United States Soccer Federation) Colorado Rapids
20	FW	Brian McBride	19 June 1972 (aged 25)	(United States Soccer Federation) Columbus Crew
21	MF	Claudio Reyna	20 July 1973 (aged 24)	(German Football Association) VfL Wolfsburg
22	DF	Alexi Lalas	1 June 1970 (aged 27)	(United States Soccer Federation) New England Revolution
23	DF	Gregg Berhalter	1 August 1973 (aged 24)	(Royal Dutch Football Association) Sparta Rotterdam
24	GK	Juergen Sommer	27 February 1969 (aged 28)	(United States Soccer Federation) Columbus Crew
