= 1997 UNCAF Nations Cup squads =

Below are the rosters for the UNCAF Nations Cup 1997 tournament in Guatemala, from April 16 to April 27, 1997.

== Group A ==
=== Costa Rica ===
Head coach: (Argentina) Horacio Cordero

No.	Pos.	Player	Date of birth (age)	Caps	Club
1	GK	Erick Lonnis	9 September 1965 (aged 31)		(Costa Rica) Saprissa
12	GK	Hermidio Barrantes	2 September 1964 (aged 32)		(Costa Rica) Cartaginés
19	GK	Paul Mayorga	21 September 1970 (aged 26)		(Costa Rica) Saprissa
2	DF	Austin Berry	5 April 1971 (aged 26)		(Costa Rica) Alajuelense
4	DF	Javier Delgado	28 July 1968 (aged 28)		(Costa Rica) Alajuelense
6	DF	Rónald González	8 August 1970 (aged 26)		(Costa Rica) Saprissa
3	DF	Luis Marín	10 August 1974 (aged 22)		(Costa Rica) Saprissa
14	DF	Hárold Wallace	7 September 1975 (aged 21)		(Costa Rica) Alajuelense
22	DF	Mauricio Wright	20 December 1970 (aged 26)		(Costa Rica) Saprissa
5	MF	Benjamín Mayorga	15 October 1966 (aged 30)		(Costa Rica) Herediano
8	MF	Wílmer López	3 August 1971 (aged 25)		(Costa Rica) Alajuelense
18	MF	Oscar Ramírez	8 December 1964 (aged 32)		(Costa Rica) Belén
16	MF	Joaquín Guillén	12 January 1968 (aged 29)		(Costa Rica) Alajuelense
20	MF	Heriberto Quirós	26 July 1972 (aged 24)		(Costa Rica) Cartaginés
11	MF	Luis Diego Arnáez	11 May 1967 (aged 29)		(Costa Rica) Alajuelense
7	FW	Rolando Fonseca	6 June 1974 (aged 22)		(Colombia) America de Cali
9	FW	Gérald Drummond	8 September 1976 (aged 20)		(Costa Rica) Saprissa
13	FW	Norman Gómez	9 January 1965 (aged 32)		(Costa Rica) Cartaginés
15	FW	Allan Oviedo	5 November 1970 (aged 26)		(Costa Rica) Herediano

=== Guatemala ===
Head coach: (Argentina) Miguel Brindisi

No.	Pos.	Player	Date of birth (age)	Caps	Club
1	GK	Edgar Estrada	16 November 1967 (aged 29)	24	(Guatemala) Comunicaciones
12	GK	Vinicio Ovando	1 December 1976 (aged 20)	3	(Guatemala) Municipal
2	DF	Erick Miranda	17 December 1971 (aged 25)	21	(Guatemala) Comunicaciones
4	DF	Nelson Cáceres	19 March 1974 (aged 22)	1	(Guatemala) Comunicaciones
6	DF	Rolando Cedeño	4 June 1971 (aged 25)	1	(Guatemala) América de Chimaltenango
3	DF	Iván León	3 March 1967 (aged 29)	23	(Guatemala) Comunicaciones
19	DF	German Ruano	17 October 1971 (aged 25)	19	(Guatemala) Municipal
5	MF	Julio Girón	2 March 1970 (aged 26)	31	(Guatemala) Aurora
16	MF	Martín Machón	4 February 1973 (aged 24)	22	(Guatemala) Comunicaciones
8	MF	Juan Manuel Funes	16 May 1966 (aged 30)		(Guatemala) Municipal
14	DF	Víctor Gómez	5 October 1969 (aged 27)	1	(Guatemala) Comunicaciones
23	MF	Jorge Pérez	4 February 1965 (aged 32)		(Guatemala) Cobán Imperial
15	MF	Jorge Rodas	9 October 1971 (aged 25)		(Guatemala) Comunicaciones
10	MF	Edgar Valencia	31 March 1971 (aged 25)		(Guatemala) Comunicaciones
13	FW	Julio Rodas	9 December 1966 (aged 30)		(Guatemala) Comunicaciones
21	FW	Guillermo Ramírez	26 March 1978 (aged 18)		(Guatemala) Municipal
7	FW	Oscar Samayoa	8 February 1975 (aged 22)		(Guatemala) Comunicaciones
9	FW	Juan Carlos Plata	1 January 1971 (aged 26)		(Guatemala) Municipal
11	FW	Edwin Westphal	4 March 1966 (aged 30)		(Guatemala) Comunicaciones

=== Nicaragua ===
Head coach: (Nicaragua) Mauricio Cruz

No.	Pos.	Player	Date of birth (age)	Caps	Club
1	GK	Juan Quintanilla Orellana	20 January 1970 (aged 27)		(United States) Los Angeles Galaxy
2	DF	Normán Armengol González	19 April 1973 (aged 23)		(Nicaragua) Flor de Caña
3	DF	Ezequiel Jérez	30 April 1971 (aged 25)		(Nicaragua) Diriagén
4	DF	Eitel Antonio González	10 October 1970 (aged 26)		(Nicaragua) Juventus
6	DF	Ramón Otoniel Olivas	28 February 1968 (aged 29)		(Nicaragua) Real Estelí
5	MF	Harry Daniel Cruz	2 February 1972 (aged 25)		(Trinidad and Tobago) Joe Public
7	MF	Héctor David Pérez	2 February 1972 (aged 25)		(Nicaragua) Jalapa
11	MF	José María Bermúdez	15 August 1975 (aged 21)		(Nicaragua) Diriagén
14	MF	Humberto Sánchez	4 April 1973 (aged 24)		(Nicaragua) Deportivo Universidad Centroamericana
8	FW	Livio José Bendaña	22 October 1969 (aged 27)		(Nicaragua) Walter Ferretti
9	FW	Lester González	18 July 1972 (aged 24)		(Nicaragua) Diriagén
13	FW	David Taylor	5 May 1974 (aged 22)		(Nicaragua) Managua
21	FW	José Morales	24 July 1974 (aged 22)		(Nicaragua) Real Estelí
24	FW	Hamilton West	16 October 1976 (aged 20)		(Nicaragua) Deportivo Masachapa

== Group B ==
=== El Salvador ===
Head coach: (Federal Republic of Yugoslavia) Milovan Đorić

No.	Pos.	Player	Date of birth (age)	Caps	Club
12	GK	Melvin Barrera	5 August 1976 (aged 20)		(El Salvador) Águila
1	GK	Raúl García Herrera	13 September 1962 (aged 34)		(El Salvador) Águila
22	GK	Álvaro Misael Alfaro	6 January 1971 (aged 26)		(El Salvador) Luis Ángel Firpo
2	DF	William Osorio	13 April 1971 (aged 26)		(El Salvador) FAS
3	DF	Leonel Cárcamo	5 May 1965 (aged 31)		(El Salvador) Luis Ángel Firpo
4	DF	Armando Argueta	14 December 1973 (aged 23)		(El Salvador) ADET
14	DF	Vladan Vićević	26 July 1967 (aged 29)		(El Salvador) Águila
15	DF	José Roberto Hernández	15 September 1968 (aged 28)		(El Salvador) Águila
17	DF	Luis Lazo	23 July 1970 (aged 26)		(El Salvador) Águila
19	DF	Guillermo García	3 August 1969 (aged 27)		(El Salvador) El Roble
21	DF	Mario Mayén Meza	19 May 1968 (aged 28)		(El Salvador) FAS
24	DF	Nelson Nerio	3 January 1977 (aged 20)		(El Salvador) Águila
5	MF	Carlos García	21 November 1976 (aged 20)		(El Salvador) Alianza
6	MF	Sergio Valencia	20 January 1970 (aged 27)		(El Salvador) Águila
8	MF	Elias Bladimir Montes	25 December 1973 (aged 23)		(El Salvador) Alianza
10	MF	Kilmar Jiménez	12 May 1976 (aged 20)		(El Salvador) Águila
16	MF	Pedro Vásquez Turcios	14 April 1972 (aged 25)		(El Salvador) Luis Ángel Firpo
18	MF	José Alexander Amaya	3 January 1975 (aged 22)		(El Salvador) Águila
20	MF	Erber Burgos	8 April 1969 (aged 28)		(El Salvador) FAS
23	MF	Wilfredo Iraheta	22 July 1967 (aged 29)		(El Salvador) Águila
7	FW	William Renderos	3 October 1971 (aged 25)		(El Salvador) Luis Ángel Firpo
9	FW	Waldir Guerra	2 April 1967 (aged 30)		(El Salvador) Águila
11	FW	Jaime Eduardo Reina	28 January 1977 (aged 20)		(El Salvador) ADET
13	MF	Daniel Sagastizado	10 January 1971 (aged 26)		(El Salvador) Atletico Balboa

=== Honduras ===
Head coach: (Honduras) Ramón Maradiaga

No.	Pos.	Player	Date of birth (age)	Caps	Club
1	GK	Víctor Coello	10 April 1974 (aged 23)		(Honduras) Platense
2	DF	Javier Martínez	6 December 1971 (aged 25)		(Guatemala) Cobán Imperial
3	DF	Hernaín Arzú	13 October 1967 (aged 29)		(Honduras) Motagua
4	DF	Fabio Ulloa	20 August 1976 (aged 20)		(Honduras) Olimpia
6	DF	Ninrod Medina	26 August 1976 (aged 20)		(Honduras) Motagua
21	DF	Abel Rodríguez	24 December 1976 (aged 20)		(Honduras) Platense
5	MF	Wílmer Peralta	17 February 1977 (aged 20)		(Honduras) Olimpia
8	MF	Amado Guevara	2 May 1976 (aged 20)		(Honduras) Motagua
14	MF	Antonio Arita	8 March 1975 (aged 22)		(Honduras) Platense
16	MF	Mario Chirinos	29 July 1978 (aged 18)		(Honduras) Motagua
20	MF	Fabricio Pérez	9 November 1968 (aged 28)		(Honduras) Motagua
18	MF	Ramón Romero	3 March 1972 (aged 25)		(Honduras) Motagua
13	FW	Camilo Bonilla	30 September 1971 (aged 25)		(Honduras) Real España
11	FW	Milton Núñez	30 November 1972 (aged 24)		(Guatemala) Comunicaciones
9	FW	Wilmer Velásquez	28 April 1972 (aged 24)		(Honduras) Olimpia
7	FW	Eduardo Arriola	11 October 1972 (aged 24)		(Honduras) Olimpia
15	FW	Enrique Reneau	9 April 1971 (aged 26)		(Mexico) Cruz Azul Hidalgo

=== Panama ===
Head coach: (Colombia) Oscar Aristizábal

No.	Pos.	Player	Date of birth (age)	Caps	Club
1	GK	Donaldo Gonzalez	27 November 1971 (aged 25)		(Panama) Tauro
12	GK	David Marciaga	13 August 1976 (aged 20)		(Panama) Chepo
2	DF	Franklin Delgado	18 February 1966 (aged 31)		(Honduras) Platense
3	DF	Darielt Gómez	21 October 1975 (aged 21)		(Panama) Río Abajo
4	DF	Jair Serrano	3 November 1974 (aged 22)		(Panama) Tauro
6	DF	Armando Velardo	17 May 1969 (aged 27)		(Panama) Euro Kickers
14	DF	José Alfredo Poyatos	27 November 1964 (aged 32)		(Panama) Chorrillo
21	DF	Agustín Castillo			(Panama)
23	DF	Erick Martínez	15 February 1967 (aged 30)		(Panama)
5	MF	Osvaldo Solanilla	1 December 1972 (aged 24)		(Panama) Sporting San Miguelito
8	MF	Neftalí Díaz	15 December 1971 (aged 25)		(El Salvador) FAS
10	MF	José Smith	10 April 1973 (aged 24)		(Panama) Chiriquí
15	MF	Rubén Guevara	27 May 1964 (aged 32)		(Panama) Tauro
16	MF	Rolando Palma	1 October 1972 (aged 24)		(Panama) Tauro
15	MF	Ángel Luis Rodríguez	15 February 1976 (aged 21)		(Panama) Ejecutivo Jrs.
20	MF	Mario Méndez	5 January 1977 (aged 20)		(Panama) Chiriquí
7	FW	Pércival Piggott	23 November 1966 (aged 30)		(Honduras) Victoria
9	FW	Patricio Guevara	13 March 1967 (aged 30)		(Panama) Tauro
11	FW	Julio Dely Valdés	12 March 1967 (aged 30)		(France) Paris Saint-Germain
13	FW	Oriel Ávila	29 September 1974 (aged 22)		(Panama)
17	FW	Agustín Salinas	17 May 1974 (aged 22)		(Panama) Árabe Unido
19	FW	Jorge Dely Valdés	12 March 1967 (aged 30)		(Japan) Consadole Sapporo
