= Guatemala at the CONCACAF Gold Cup =

The CONCACAF Gold Cup is North America's major tournament in senior men's football and determines the continental champion. Until 1989, the tournament was known as CONCACAF Championship. It is currently held every two years. From 1996 to 2005, nations from other confederations have regularly joined the tournament as invitees. In earlier editions, the continental championship was held in different countries, but since the inception of the Gold Cup in 1991, the United States are constant hosts or co-hosts.

From 1973 to 1989, the tournament doubled as the confederation's World Cup qualification. CONCACAF's representative team at the FIFA Confederations Cup was decided by a play-off between the winners of the last two tournament editions in 2015 via the CONCACAF Cup, but was then discontinued along with the Confederations Cup.

Since the inaugural tournament in 1963, the Gold Cup was held 28 times and has been won by seven different nations, most often by Mexico (13 titles).

Guatemala have qualified for 21 editions of the tournament, and were particularly successful in the 1960s, winning the title in 1967 and finishing in second place in 1965 and 1969. Because of a FIFA suspension from October 2016 to March 2018, they were disqualified from the 2017 qualifiers and were not able to enter qualification for 2019 at all.

== Overall record ==
CONCACAF Championship & Gold Cup record										Qualification record					
Year	Result	Position	Pld	W	D*	L	GF	GA	Squad	Pld	W	D	L	GF	GA
(El Salvador) 1963	Fourth place	4th	4	1	2	1	7	6	Squad	Qualified automatically					
(Guatemala) 1965	Runners-up	2nd	5	3	1	1	11	5	Squad	Qualified as hosts					
(Honduras) 1967	Champions	1st	5	4	1	0	7	1	Squad	2	2	0	0	6	2
(Costa Rica) 1969	Runners-up	2nd	5	3	2	0	10	2	Squad	Qualified as defending champions					
(Trinidad and Tobago) 1971	Did not qualify									2	0	1	1	1	2
(Haiti) 1973	Fifth place	5th	5	0	3	2	4	6	Squad	2	2	0	0	2	0
(Mexico) 1977	Fifth place	5th	5	1	1	3	8	10	Squad	6	3	2	1	15	6
(Honduras) 1981	Did not qualify									8	3	3	2	10	2
1985	Round 1	5th	4	2	1	1	7	3	Squad	Qualified automatically					
1989	Fourth place	4th	6	1	1	4	4	7	Squad	4	2	1	1	5	4
(United States) 1991	Group stage	7th	3	1	0	2	1	5	Squad	3	0	2	1	0	1
(Mexico) (United States) 1993	Did not enter									Did not enter					
(United States) 1996	Fourth place	4th	4	1	0	3	3	5	Squad	4	2	0	2	2	5
(United States) 1998	Group stage	7th	3	0	2	1	3	4	Squad	5	3	2	0	10	3
(United States) 2000	Group stage	10th	2	0	1	1	3	5	Squad	5	3	1	1	5	2
(United States) 2002	Group stage	12th	2	0	0	2	1	4	Squad	5	2	3	0	9	5
(Mexico) (United States) 2003	Group stage	11th	2	0	1	1	1	3	Squad	5	3	1	1	10	4
(United States) 2005	Group stage	11th	3	0	1	2	4	9	Squad	5	3	1	1	10	5
(United States) 2007	Quarter-finals	8th	4	1	1	2	2	5	Squad	5	3	1	1	3	2
(United States) 2009	Did not qualify									3	0	0	3	1	6
(United States) 2011	Quarter-finals	8th	4	1	1	2	5	4	Squad	3	1	0	2	3	6
(United States) 2013	Did not qualify									4	0	3	1	3	5
(Canada) (United States) 2015	Group stage	12th	3	0	1	2	1	4	Squad	4	3	0	1	7	4
(United States) 2017	Disqualified due to FIFA suspension									Disqualified due to FIFA suspension					
(Costa Rica) (Jamaica) (United States) 2019	Disqualified due to FIFA suspension									Disqualified due to FIFA suspension					
(United States) 2021	Group stage	13th	3	0	1	2	1	6	Squad	6	5	1	0	30	1
(Canada) (United States) 2023	Quarter-finals	5th	4	2	1	1	4	3	Squad	6	4	1	1	11	4
(Canada) (United States) 2025	Semi-finals	3rd	5	2	1	2	6	6	Squad	6	3	1	2	10	8
Total	1 Title	21/28	81	23	23	35	93	103	—	93	47	24	22	153	77

=== Match overview ===
Tournament	Round	Opponent	Score	Venue
(El Salvador) 1963	Final round	Honduras	1–2	San Salvador
(El Salvador) 1963	Final round	Panama	2–2	San Salvador
(El Salvador) 1963	Final round	Nicaragua	3–1	San Salvador
(El Salvador) 1963	Final round	El Salvador	1–1	San Salvador
(Guatemala) 1965	Final round	Costa Rica	0–0	Guatemala City
(Guatemala) 1965	Final round	Haiti	3–0	Guatemala City
(Guatemala) 1965	Final round	El Salvador	4–1	Guatemala City
(Guatemala) 1965	Final round	Netherlands Antilles	3–2	Guatemala City
(Guatemala) 1965	Final round	Mexico	1–2	Guatemala City
(Honduras) 1967	Final round	Haiti	2–1	Tegucigalpa
(Honduras) 1967	Final round	Mexico	1–0	Tegucigalpa
(Honduras) 1967	Final round	Honduras	0–0	Tegucigalpa
(Honduras) 1967	Final round	Trinidad and Tobago	2–0	Tegucigalpa
(Honduras) 1967	Final round	Nicaragua	2–0	Tegucigalpa
(Costa Rica) 1969	Final round	Trinidad and Tobago	2–0	San José
(Costa Rica) 1969	Final round	Netherlands Antilles	6–1	San José
(Costa Rica) 1969	Final round	Mexico	1–0	San José
(Costa Rica) 1969	Final round	Jamaica	0–0	San José
(Costa Rica) 1969	Final round	Costa Rica	1–1	San José
(Haiti) 1973	Final round	Mexico	0–0	Port-au-Prince
(Haiti) 1973	Final round	Netherlands Antilles	2–2	Port-au-Prince
(Haiti) 1973	Final round	Trinidad and Tobago	0–1	Port-au-Prince
(Haiti) 1973	Final round	Haiti	1–2	Port-au-Prince
(Haiti) 1973	Final round	Honduras	1–1	Port-au-Prince
(Mexico) 1977	Final round	Suriname	3–2	Monterrey
(Mexico) 1977	Final round	Haiti	1–2	Monterrey
(Mexico) 1977	Final round	Canada	1–2	Mexico City
(Mexico) 1977	Final round	Mexico	1–2	Mexico City
(Mexico) 1977	Final round	El Salvador	2–2	Mexico City
1985	Group stage	Canada	1–2	Victoria, Canada
1985	Group stage	Haiti	1–0	Port-au-Prince, Haiti
1985	Group stage	Canada	1–1	Guatemala City, Guatemala
1985	Group stage	Haiti	4–0	Guatemala City, Guatemala
1989	Group stage	Costa Rica	1–0	Guatemala City, Guatemala
1989	Group stage	Costa Rica	1–2	San José, Costa Rica
1989	Group stage	United States	1–2	New Britain, United States
1989	Group stage	Trinidad and Tobago	0–1	Guatemala City, Guatemala
1989	Group stage	Trinidad and Tobago	1–2	Port of Spain, Trinidad and Tobago
1989	Group stage	United States	0–0	Guatemala City, Guatemala
(United States) 1991	Group stage	Costa Rica	0–2	Pasadena
(United States) 1991	Group stage	United States	0–3	Pasadena
(United States) 1991	Group stage	Trinidad and Tobago	1–0	Los Angeles
(United States) 1996	Group stage	Mexico	0–1	San Diego
(United States) 1996	Group stage	Saint Vincent and the Grenadines	3–0	Anaheim
(United States) 1996	Semi-finals	Mexico	0–1	San Diego
(United States) 1996	Third place match	United States	0–3	Los Angeles
(United States) 1998	Group stage	El Salvador	0–0	Los Angeles
(United States) 1998	Group stage	Brazil	1–1	Miami
(United States) 1998	Group stage	Jamaica	2–3	Los Angeles
(United States) 2000	Group stage	Trinidad and Tobago	2–4	Los Angeles
(United States) 2000	Group stage	Mexico	1–1	Los Angeles
(United States) 2002	Group stage	Mexico	1–3	Pasadena
(United States) 2002	Group stage	El Salvador	0–1	Pasadena
(United States) (Mexico) 2003	Group stage	Jamaica	0–2	Miami
(United States) (Mexico) 2003	Group stage	Colombia	1–1	Miami
(United States) 2005	Group stage	Jamaica	3–4	Carson
(United States) 2005	Group stage	Mexico	0–4	Los Angeles
(United States) 2005	Group stage	South Africa	1–1	Houston
(United States) 2007	Group stage	United States	0–1	Carson
(United States) 2007	Group stage	El Salvador	1–0	Carson
(United States) 2007	Group stage	Trinidad and Tobago	1–1	Foxboro
(United States) 2007	Quarter-finals	Canada	0–3	Foxboro
(United States) 2011	Group stage	Honduras	0–0	Carson
(United States) 2011	Group stage	Jamaica	0–2	Miami
(United States) 2011	Group stage	Grenada	4–0	Harrison
(United States) 2011	Quarter-finals	Mexico	1–2	East Rutherford
(United States) (Canada) 2015	Group stage	Trinidad and Tobago	1–3	Chicago
(United States) (Canada) 2015	Group stage	Mexico	0–0	Glendale
(United States) (Canada) 2015	Group stage	Cuba	0–1	Charlotte
(United States) 2021	Group stage	El Salvador	0–2	Frisco
(United States) 2021	Group stage	Mexico	0–3	Dallas
(United States) 2021	Group stage	Trinidad and Tobago	1–1	Frisco
(United States) (Canada) 2023	Group stage	Cuba	1–0	Fort Lauderdale
(United States) (Canada) 2023	Group stage	Canada	0–0	Houston
(United States) (Canada) 2023	Group stage	Guadeloupe	3–2	Harrison
(United States) (Canada) 2023	Quarter-finals	Jamaica	0–1	Cincinnati
(United States) (Canada) 2025	Group stage	Jamaica	1–0	Carson
(United States) (Canada) 2025	Group stage	Panama	0–1	Austin
(United States) (Canada) 2025	Group stage	Guadeloupe	3–2	Houston
(United States) (Canada) 2025	Quarter-finals	Canada	1–1 (6–5 p)	Minneapolis
(United States) (Canada) 2025	Semi-finals	United States	1–2	St. Louis

=== Record by opponent ===
CONCACAF Championship/Gold Cup matches (by team)
Opponent	W	D	L	Pld	GF	GA
Brazil	0	1	0	1	1	1
Canada	0	3	3	6	4	9
Colombia	0	1	0	1	1	1
Costa Rica	1	2	2	5	3	5
Cuba	1	0	1	2	1	1
El Salvador	2	3	2	7	8	7
Grenada	1	0	0	1	4	0
Guadeloupe	2	0	0	2	6	4
Haiti	4	0	2	6	12	5
Honduras	0	3	1	4	2	3
Jamaica	1	1	5	7	6	12
Mexico	2	3	8	13	7	19
Netherlands Antilles	2	1	0	3	11	5
Nicaragua	2	0	0	2	5	1
Panama	0	1	1	2	2	3
Saint Vincent and the Grenadines	1	0	0	1	3	0
South Africa	0	1	0	1	1	1
Suriname	1	0	0	1	3	2
Trinidad and Tobago	3	2	5	10	11	13
United States	0	1	5	6	2	11
