= German Ruano =

Guatemalan footballer (born 1971)

Personal information
- Full name: German Giovanni Ruano González
- Date of birth: 17 October 1971 (age 55)
- Place of birth: Guatemala City, Guatemala
- Height: 1.75 m (5 ft 9 in)
- Position: Right back

Senior career*
| Years | Team | Apps | (Gls) |
| 1991–1993 | Suchitepéquez | | |
| 1993–2009 | Municipal | 251 | (4) |

International career
| 1995–2001 | Guatemala | 57 | (0) |
- * Club domestic league appearances and goals

German Giovanni Ruano González (born 17 October 1971), popularly known as El Chino, is a Guatemalan former footballer who played as a right-back, spending the majority of his career for Municipal in the Guatemalan top division, and was also a member of the Guatemala national team.

== Club career ==
Born in Guatemala City, Ruano, a right-back of outstanding defensive and attacking skills, began his career with local side Suchitepéquez. In 1993, he was brought by coach Horacio Cordero to Municipal, where he would remain for the next 16 years, winning 12 league titles and five domestic cups, thus becoming one of the most honoured players in the history of the club. By 2008, he had become the second-longest serving active squad member after Juan Carlos Plata.

After finishing second on the 2008–09 clausura tournament, Municipal did not renew his contract, and afterwards Ruano, who wore the number 17 on his shirt throughout his career, announced his retirement.

== International career ==
Ruano made his debut for Guatemala in a December 1995 UNCAF Nations Cup match against Panama and went on to collect 57 caps in the next six years, appearing in a total 19 matches during the qualification processes to the World Cups of 1998 and 2002. He also played four matches at the 1996 CONCACAF Gold Cup and two matches at the 1998 CONCACAF Gold Cup.

His final international was a January 2001 FIFA World Cup qualification match against Costa Rica, a game which also marked the end of the international careers of national team stalwarts Jorge Rodas and Edgar Valencia.

== Honours ==
Club

- Liga Mayor / Liga Nacional winner (12): 1993–94, 2000 Apertura, 2000 Clausura, 2001, 2002 Clausura, 2003 Apertura, 2004 Apertura, 2005 Clausura, 2005 Apertura, 2006 Clausura, 2006 Apertura, 2008 Clausura
- Domestic Cup tournament winner (5): 1994, 1995, 1998, 2003, 2004
- Campeón de Campeones (Super Cup) winner (2): 1994, 1997
