= Khadafi Gou =

Cuban footballer

Personal information
- Full name: Khadafi Gou Gómez
- Date of birth: 15 April 1977 (age 49)
- Height: 1.80 m (5 ft 11 in)
- Position: Midfielder

Senior career*
| Years | Team | Apps | (Gls) |
- Matanzas

International career
| 1998 | Cuba U21 | | |
| 1996–1998 | Cuba | 7 | (0) |
- * Club domestic league appearances and goals

Khadafi Gou Gómez (born 15 April 1977) is a Cuban former footballer who played as a midfielder for Cuban club Matanzas. He also made seven appearances with the Cuba national team in the late 1990s.

== International career ==
Gou made his international debut on 28 August 1996 – the 19-year-old played the full 90 minutes of a 2–2 friendly draw against Honduras. In the months following, he earned five caps during 1998 FIFA World Cup qualification.

He was later selected to represent his country at the 1998 CONCACAF Gold Cup held in the United States. He played in one match, coming on as a substitute during a 7–2 group stage defeat to Costa Rica on 4 February, before they were eliminated. This was his final senior international appearance, although he was on the Cuba national under-21 team squad at the 1998 Caribbean Cup as preparation for the 1998 Central American and Caribbean Games.

== Career statistics ==
=== International ===
| National team | Year | Apps | Goals |
|---|---|---|---|
| Cuba | 1996 | 6 | 0 |
| Cuba | 1997 | 0 | 0 |
| Cuba | 1998 | 1 | 0 |
| Total | | 7 | 0 |
