= Guillermo García (Salvadoran footballer) =

Salvadoran footballer (born 1969)

Personal information
- Full name: Guillermo Alberto García Ramírez
- Date of birth: August 4, 1969 (age 57)
- Place of birth: El Salvador
- Position: Defender

Senior career*
| Years | Team | Apps | (Gls) |
| ? | ? | | |
| 1997–2006 | Luis Ángel Firpo | | |

International career^{‡}
| 1997–2002 | El Salvador | 38 | (1) |
- * Club domestic league appearances and goals ‡ National team caps and goals as of 5 August 2012

Guillermo Alberto García Ramírez (born 4 August 1969) is a retired Salvadoran professional footballer.

== Club career ==
García played the majority of his career for Luis Ángel Firpo.

== International career ==
García was a relative late newcomer to the national team set-up, he only made his debut for El Salvador aged 27, in an April 1997 friendly match against Guatemala and has earned a total of 38 caps, scoring 1 goal. He has represented his country in 6 FIFA World Cup qualification matches and played at the 1997, 1999 and 2001 UNCAF Nations Cups, as well as at the 2002 CONCACAF Gold Cup.

His final international game was a January 2002 UNCAF Nations Cup match against the United States.

=== International goals ===
Scores and results list El Salvador's goal tally first.

| # | Date | Venue | Opponent | Score | Result | Competition |
|---|---|---|---|---|---|---|
| 1 | 18 August 1999 | Ethniko Kavala, Kavala, Greece | Greece | 1-1 | 1-3 | Friendly match |
