= Engelver Herrera =

Guatemalan footballer

Personal information
- Full name: Engelver Leonel Herrera Revolorio
- Date of birth: May 11, 1973 (age 53)
- Place of birth: Guatemala City, Guatemala
- Height: 1.72 m (5 ft 7 1/2 in)
- Position: Defender

Senior career*
Years	Team	Apps	(Gls)
1995–2000	CSD Comunicaciones		
2000	USAC		
2001	Deportivo Zacapa		
2006–2009	Deportivo Petapa	30	(2)
2009–present	Antigua GFC		

International career^{‡}
1995–2000	Guatemala	18	(1)
- * Club domestic league appearances and goals as of 24 July 2010 ‡ National team caps and goals as of 24 July 2010

Engelver Leonel Herrera Revolorio (born 11 May 1973) is a Guatemalan former football defender who last played for Antigua GFC of the Guatemalan second division.

== Club career ==
Herrera, born in the country capital, played for Guatemalan giants CSD Comunicaciones in the second part of the 1990s. He has also played for USAC, Zacapa and Petapa before joining Antigua in summer 2009.

== International career ==
He made his debut for Guatemala in a December 1995 UNCAF Nations Cup match against Panama and has earned a total of 18 caps, scoring 1 goal. He has represented his country in 1 FIFA World Cup qualification match, which turned out to be his final international. He also played at the 1995 and 1999 UNCAF Nations Cups as well as at the 1998 and 2000 CONCACAF Gold Cups.
