= Joaquín Guillén =

Costa Rican footballer (born 1968)

Personal information
- Full name: Joaquín Bernardo Guillén González
- Date of birth: 12 January 1968 (age 58)
- Place of birth: Alajuela, Costa Rica
- Position: Midfielder

Senior career*
Years	Team	Apps	(Gls)
1987–1998	Alajuelense	331	
1998–1999	Municipal		
1999–2000	Santos de Guápiles		
2001	Cartaginés		
2001–2002	Carmelita		

International career^{‡}
1991–1998	Costa Rica	20	(0)
- * Club domestic league appearances and goals as of 16 January 2015 ‡ National team caps and goals as of 16 January 2015

Joaquín Bernardo Guillén González (born 12 January 1968) is a retired Costa Rican football player.

He played most of his career at hometown club Alajuelense.

== Club career ==
Guillén totalled 331 league matches for Liga. In summer 1998 he joined compatriots Rónald Gómez and Richard Smith at Guatemalan side Municipal. He had a few seasons back at home with Santos de Guápiles, moved to Cartaginés in January 2001 and joined Carmelita in summer 2001.

== International career ==
Guillén made his debut for Costa Rica in a November 1991 friendly match against the United States and earned a total of 20 caps, scoring no goals. He represented his country in 2 FIFA World Cup qualification matches and played at the 1997 UNCAF Nations Cup, the 1998 CONCACAF Gold Cup and the 1997 Copa América.

His final international was a February 1998 CONCACAF Gold Cup match against the United States.
