= Raúl Lara =

Mexican footballer (born 1973)

Personal information
- Full name: Raúl Rodrigo Lara Tovar
- Date of birth: 28 February 1973 (age 53)
- Place of birth: Mexico City, Mexico
- Height: 1.77 m (5 ft 9 1/2 in)
- Position: Midfielder

Team information
- Current team: América (Assistant)

Senior career*
| Years | Team | Apps | (Gls) |
| 1990–2002 | América | 386 | (3) |
| 2003 | San Luis | 18 | (0) |
| 2003–2004 | Puebla | 30 | (0) |
| 2004–2005 | BUAP | 13 | (0) |

International career^{‡}
| 1996–2000 | Mexico | 39 | (0) |

Managerial career
- 2010–2013: América Reserves and Academy
- 2010–2013: América (Assistant)
- 2013–2014: América Reserves and Academy
- 2014–2015: América Coapa (Assistant)
- 2015–2017: América Reserves and Academy
- 2017–2018: América Premier (Assistant)
- 2018–2022: América Reserves and Academy
- 2022–: América (Assistant)
Medal record
Representing Mexico
| Winner | CONCACAF Gold Cup | 1998 |
| Third place | Copa America | 1997 |
| Third place | Copa America | 1999 |
- * Club domestic league appearances and goals as of June 14, 2008 ‡ National team caps and goals as of August 22, 2007

Raúl Rodrigo Lara Tovar (born 28 February 1973) is a Mexican former professional footballer who played as a midfielder and manager. He is the current assistant manager of Liga MX club América.

== Career ==
Lara was a member of the Mexico national team at the 1998 FIFA World Cup, playing three games at the tournament. He participated also at 1996 Summer Olympics. Famous for two mistakes that caused Mexico's elimination against Germany in the 1998 FIFA World Cup.

== Honours ==
América

- Mexican Primera División: Verano 2002
- CONCACAF Champions' Cup: 1992

Mexico

- CONCACAF Gold Cup: 1996, 1998
- Pan American Games Silver Medal: 1995
- CONCACAF Pre-Olympic Tournament: 1996

Individual

- CONCACAF Gold Cup Golden Ball: 1996
