= Melvin Barrera =

Salvadoran footballer (born 1976)

Personal information
- Full name: Melvin Barrera Chávez
- Date of birth: August 5, 1976 (age 50)
- Place of birth: El Salvador
- Position: Goalkeeper

Youth career
- Northwestern High School

Senior career*
Years	Team	Apps	(Gls)
- Mogotillo
1997–1999	Águila		

International career^{‡}
1997	El Salvador	4	(0)
- * Club domestic league appearances and goals as of March 25, 2017 ‡ National team caps and goals as of March 25, 2017

Melvin Barrera Chávez (born 5 August 1976 in San Salvador, El Salvador) is a retired Salvadoran football goalkeeper.

He is now working in Maryland.

== Club career ==
Nicknamed Scorpion, Barrera learned his trade in the USA as son of Salvadoran immigrants. He went to play in El Salvador for Águila, one of the big boys in Salvadoran football.

== International career ==
Barrera made his debut for El Salvador in an April 1997 UNCAF Nations Cup match against Honduras and has earned a total of 4 caps, all of them at the 1997 UNCAF Nations Cup.
