= Clifton Waugh =

Jamaican footballer (born 1972)

Personal information
- Full name: Clifton Anthony Waugh
- Date of birth: 10 September 1972 (age 54)
- Place of birth: Port Maria, St Mary, Jamaica
- Height: 6 ft 3 in (1.91 m)
- Position: Defender

Team information
- Current team: Harbour View FC
- Number: 20

Youth career
- Black Star

Senior career*
Years	Team	Apps	(Gls)
1996–1997	Virginia CU Rams	36	(1)
- Olympic Gardens
1999–2001	Harbourview		
2001	→ Richmond Kickers (loan)		
2001–present	Harbourview		

International career^{‡}
1998–2000	Jamaica	20	(0)
- * Club domestic league appearances and goals as of 25 December 2007 ‡ National team caps and goals as of 25 December 2007

Clifton Waugh (born 10 September 1972) is a Jamaican soccer defender who currently plays for Harbour View FC.

== Club career ==
A big defender, Waugh played two years at Virginia Commonwealth University and for Olympic Gardens before moving to Harbour View. Also, he was loaned out to Richmond Kickers for their 2001 season.

== International career ==
He has also appeared for the 'Reggae Boyz', making his debut in 1998 against Saudi Arabia and playing his last international in 2000 against Japan. He just missed out on Jamaica's 1998 World Cup squad but did travel with the team to France.
