= Luis Diego Arnáez =

Costa Rican footballer and manager (born 1967)

Personal information
- Full name: Luis Diego Arnáez Villegas
- Date of birth: 6 November 1967 (age 58)
- Place of birth: Pozo de Agua, Nicoya, Costa Rica
- Height: 1.81 m (5 ft 11 in)
- Position: Midfielder

Team information
- Current team: Municipal Grecia (head coach)

Senior career*
Years	Team	Apps	(Gls)
1987–1993	Puntarenas	190	(17)
1993–2005	Alajuelense	404	(76)
Total		594	(93)

International career
1991–2000	Costa Rica	31	(9)

Managerial career
- 2005–2007: Puntarenas
- 2007–2008: Alajuelense
- 2008–2009: Costa Rica (assistant)
- 2010: Herediano
- 2014–2015: Puntarenas
- 2018–2019: Alajuelense
- 2019: Municipal Grecia
- 2019–2020: La U Universitarios
- 2020–: Municipal Grecia
- * Club domestic league appearances and goals

Luis Diego Arnáez Villegas (born 6 November 1967) is a Costa Rican football manager and former player who manages Municipal Grecia.

== Club career ==
A midfielder, Arnáez made his professional debut on 2 August 1987 for Puntarenas against Ramonense and he scored his first senior goal on 14 February 1988 against San Carlos. After almost 200 games for Puntarenas he left for Alajuelense where he would play over 400 matches. His trophies for Alajuelense included seven league titles and the 2004 CONCACAF Champions' Cup, when Alajuelense defeated rival Deportivo Saprissa in the two-leg final.

His final game was on 23 April 2005, against Pérez Zeledón.

== International career ==
Nicknamed el Flaco (the Skinny one), he made his debut for the national team in an April 1991 friendly match against Mexico, collecting a total of 31 caps and scoring 9 goals. Arnáez appeared in seven of Costa Rica's qualifying matches for the 1994 FIFA World Cup, as well as two qualifiers for the 1998 FIFA World Cup. He also represented Costa Rica at the 1997 UNCAF Nations Cup and in the 1998 CONCACAF Gold Cup, playing against Cuba and the United States. Upon Alajuelense's triumph in the 2004 CONCACAF Champions' Cup, he was recalled to the national team at the age of 36 by coach Jorge Luis Pinto. His final cap came in a 5–2 loss in World Cup qualifying against Honduras on 18 August 2004.

== Managerial career ==
Later, Arnáez coached the first division team Puntarenas in his home country. After getting fired from the team, he coached Liga Deportiva Alajuelense for six months. He then had a spell as an assistant coach for the Costa Rica national football team and was appointed manager of Herediano in December 2009 but returned to Puntarenas in March 2014.

== Career statistics ==
Scores and results list Costa Rica's goal tally first.

N.	Date	Venue	Opponent	Score	Result	Competition
1.	27 May 1992	Estadio Nacional de Costa Rica, San José, Costa Rica	Ecuador		2–1	Friendly match
2.	8 November 1992	Estadio Ricardo Saprissa Aymá, San José, Costa Rica	Honduras	2–0	2–3	1994 FIFA World Cup qualification
3.	13 December 1992	Estadio Ricardo Saprissa Aymá, San José, Costa Rica	Saint Vincent and the Grenadines	5–0	5–0	1994 FIFA World Cup qualification
4.	19 February 1997	Estadio Rosabal Cordero, Heredia, Costa Rica, Costa Rica	Venezuela	4–1	5–2	Friendly match
5.	18 April 1997	Estadio Mateo Flores, Guatemala City, Guatemala	Nicaragua	1–0	5–1	1997 UNCAF Nations Cup
6.	25 April 1997	Estadio Mateo Flores, Guatemala City, Guatemala	El Salvador	1–0	1–0	1997 UNCAF Nations Cup
7.	4 May 1997	Estadio Cuscatlán, San Salvador, El Salvador	El Salvador	1–2	1–2	1998 FIFA World Cup qualification
8.	21 January 1998	Estadio Chorotega, Nicoya, Costa Rica	Honduras	1–1	1–4	Friendly match
9.	25 November 1999	Estadio Alejandro Morera Soto, Alajuela, Costa Rica	Slovakia	4–0	4–0	Friendly match
