= Waldir Guerra =

Salvadoran footballer (born 1967)

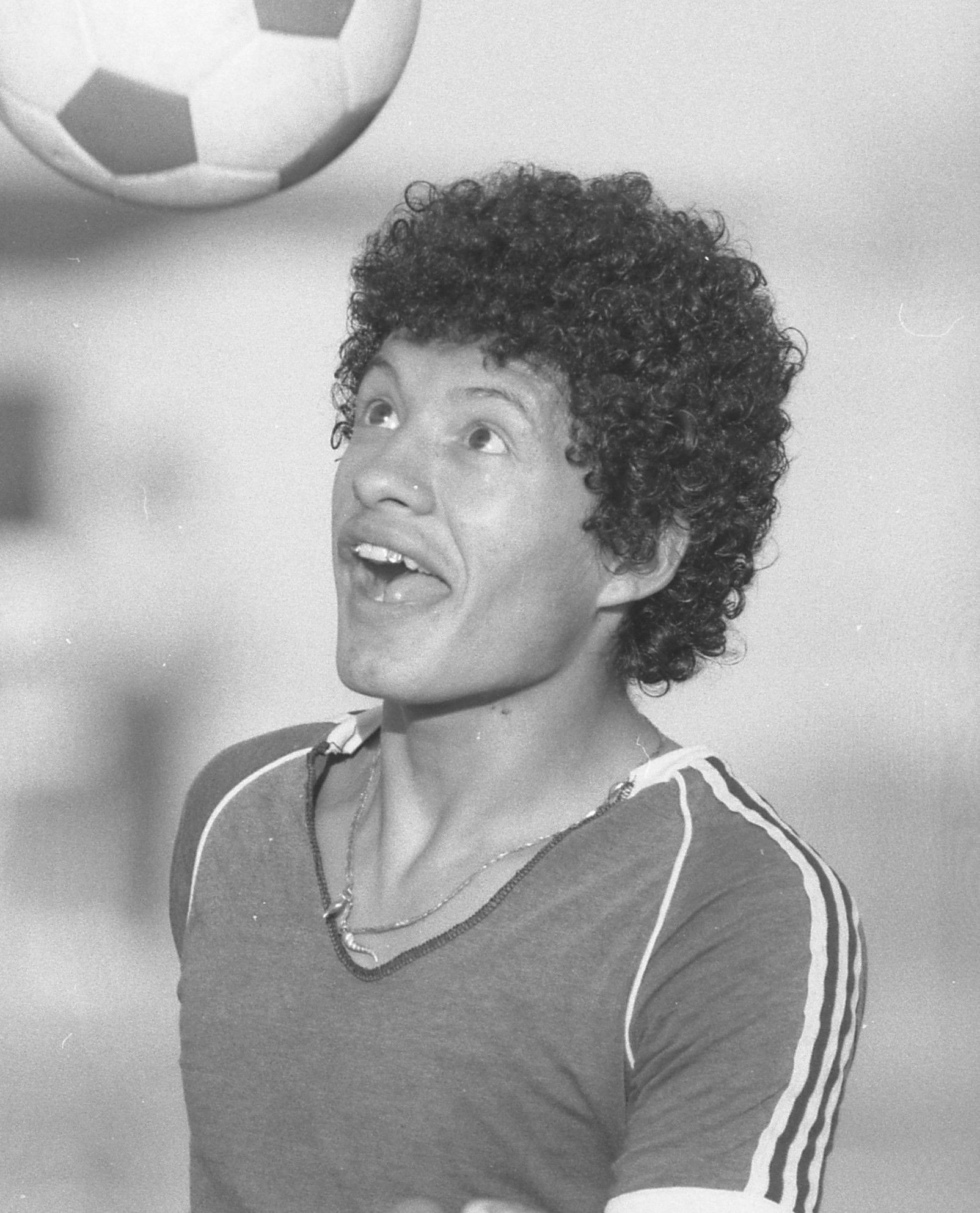
- Guerra in 1985

Personal information
- Full name: Waldir Guerra
- Date of birth: April 2, 1967 (age 59)
- Place of birth: San Vicente, El Salvador
- Height: 1.73 m (5 ft 8 in)
- Position: Striker

Youth career
- 1986: Bell High School

Senior career*
Years	Team	Apps	(Gls)
1990	Los Angeles Heat		
1993–1995	Los Angeles Salsa		
1997–2002	Águila		
2002–2003	Aspirante		

International career^{‡}
1997–1999	El Salvador	13	(3)
- * Club domestic league appearances and goals ‡ National team caps and goals as of 20 May 2011

Waldir Guerra (born April 2, 1967) is a retired Salvadoran footballer who played for the El Salvador national football team during his career.

== Club career ==
Guerra arrived in the USA as a refugee in 1982 and attended Bells High School for whom he scored 117 goals in his first three years, which was a record. As a senior, he played for American Professional Soccer League side Los Angeles Heat until they went out of business in 1990. Three years later he played for Los Angeles Salsa for whom he scored once in 22 matches in his first season.

He returned to his native El Salvador in 1997 to play for Águila. He topped the goalscoring charts of the 1999 Apertura.

== International career ==
Guerra made his debut for El Salvador in an April 1997 friendly match against Guatemala in which he immediately scored a goal, and has earned a total of 13 caps, scoring 3 goals. He has represented his country in 2 FIFA World Cup qualification matches and played at the 1997 and 1999 UNCAF Nations Cups as well as at the 1998 CONCACAF Gold Cup.

His final international game was a March 1999 UNCAF Nations Cup match against Guatemala.

=== International goals ===
Scores and results list El Salvador's goal tally first.

#	Date	Venue	Opponent	Score	Result	Competition
1	13 April 1997	Robert F. Kennedy Memorial Stadium, Washington, D.C., United States	Guatemala	1-0	1-1	Friendly match
2	20 April 1997	Estadio Mateo Flores, Guatemala City, Guatemala	Panama	2-0	2-0	1997 UNCAF Nations Cup
3	9 November 1997	Estadio Cuscatlán, San Salvador, El Salvador	Jamaica	2-2	2-2	1998 FIFA World Cup qualification
