= Rolando Cedeño =

Guatemalan footballer

Personal information
- Full name: Rolando José Cedeño Morales
- Date of birth: 4 June 1971 (age 55)
- Place of birth: Managua, Nicaragua
- Height: 1.85 m (6 ft 1 in)
- Position: Defender

Senior career*
Years	Team	Apps	(Gls)
1989–1997	Municipal		
1999–2002	Xelajú MC		
2002–2003	Jaguares de Tapachula		
2003–2004	Deportivo Marquense		
2004–2005	Deportivo Jalapa		
2005–2006	Antigua		

International career
1997–2003	Guatemala	7	(0)
- * Club domestic league appearances and goals

Rolando José Cedeño Morales (born 4 June 1971) is a Guatemalan former footballer.

== Career statistics ==
=== International ===
National team	Year	Apps	Goals
Guatemala	1997	3	0
Guatemala	1998	2	0
Guatemala	2000	1	0
Guatemala	2003	1	0
Total		7	0
