= Iván León =

Guatemalan footballer and manager

Personal information
- Full name: Marlon Iván León y León
- Date of birth: March 3, 1967 (age 59)
- Place of birth: Guatemala City, Guatemala
- Position: Defender

Youth career
- Modelito
- Deportivo Esso Recreo
- Texaco Company

Senior career*
Years	Team	Apps	(Gls)
1985–1986	Deportivo Escuintla		
1987	Comunicaciones		
1988	Deportivo Escuintla		
1989	Cobán Imperial		
1990–1992	Comunicaciones		
1992–1994	Deportivo Escuintla		
1994–1999	Comunicaciones		
1999–2000	Aurora F.C.		

International career^{‡}
1989–1999	Guatemala	34	(0)

Managerial career
- 2002: Nueva Concepción
- 2002–2005: Heredia
- Guatemala U-21
- 2007–2008: CSD Comunicaciones
- 2008: Xinabajul
- 2008–2009: Deportivo Malacateco
- 2009: Zacapa
- 2010: Heredia
- 2020-2021: Achuapa
- * Club domestic league appearances and goals as of 25 July 2010 ‡ National team caps and goals as of 25 July 2010

Deportivo Quiché FC 2023

Marlon Iván "El Chino" León y León (born 3 March 1967) is a Guatemalan football manager and retired football defender who has played over 10 years for Guatemala's national team.

He managed Heredia in the 2010 Clausura.

== Club career ==
León has played the majority of his career for CSD Comunicaciones, one of Guatemala's most successful football clubs. He has also played for Deportivo Escuintla, Cobán Imperial and army side Aurora.

== International career ==
He made his debut for Guatemala in a February 1989 friendly match against Poland and has earned a total of 34 caps, scoring no goals. He has represented his country in 4 FIFA World Cup qualification matches and played at several UNCAF Cups as well as at the 1998, 2000 and 2003 CONCACAF Gold Cups.

His final international was a March 1999 US Cup match against the United States.

== Managerial career ==
León started his coaching career at second division side Deportivo Nueva Concepción and managed Heredia, the Guatemalan U-21 side, Comunicaciones, Xinabajul whom he led to the premier division, Malacateco and Zacapa. In February 2010, he rejoined Heredia.
