= Austin Berry (footballer, born 1971) =

Costa Rican footballer (born 1971)

Personal information
- Full name: Austin Gerardo Berry Moya
- Date of birth: 5 April 1971 (age 55)
- Place of birth: San José, Costa Rica
- Height: 1.78 m (5 ft 10 in)
- Position: Midfielder

Senior career*
Years	Team	Apps	(Gls)
1989–1992	Alajuelense		
1993–1994	SC Freiburg	12	(1)
1994–1999	Alajuelense		
1999	Antigua		
2000–2006	Herediano		

International career
1991–2002	Costa Rica	65	(6)

Managerial career
- Herediano (assistant)
- * Club domestic league appearances and goals

Austin Gerardo Berry Moya (born 5 April 1971) is a Costa Rican former professional footballer who played as a midfielder.

== Club career ==
Berry started his professional career with Alajuelense with whom he stayed for 10 years except for a short stint in Germany with SC Freiburg. After a season in Guatemala with Antigua, he joined Herediano in 2000 and retired from playing football in 2006.

=== Doping case ===
On 24 July 1996, it was confirmed Berry tested positive of Phenmetrazine after a league game on 7 July 1996 against Cartaginés and was subsequently banned for two months.

== International career ==
In 1989, Berry played for Costa Rica U-20 at the 1989 FIFA World Youth Championship in Saudi Arabia.

He made his debut for the senior national team in a June 1991 friendly match against Colombia and collected a total of 65 caps, scoring 6 goals. He has represented his country in 16 FIFA World Cup qualification matches and played at the 1995, 1997 and 2001 UNCAF Nations Cups as well as at the 1991, 1998 and 2000 CONCACAF Gold Cups and the 1997 and 2001 Copa América. He also was a non-playing squad member at the 2002 CONCACAF Gold Cup.

He played his last international in a March 2002 friendly against Morocco but missed out on the 2002 FIFA World Cup squad.

== Managerial career ==
In May 2010 he was appointed Director of the Institute of Sport and Recreation but resigned two weeks later after critics claimed he lacked experience for the position. He later became assistant manager at Herediano.

== Personal life ==
Berry is the son of Esmeralda Moya and Austin Berry. He was married to Glenda Peraza and divorced on 2014. They had one daughter named Kianny. Berry has two daughters, Krissia and Camila with Margarita Torres prior to his marriage.
