= Wilfredo Iraheta =

Salvadoran footballer (born 1967)

Personal information
- Full name: Wilfredo Iraheta Sanabria
- Date of birth: February 22, 1967 (age 59)
- Place of birth: Sensuntepeque, El Salvador
- Height: 1.74 m (5 ft 8 1/2 in)
- Position: Defender

Youth career
- 1982–1987: Sensuntepeque

Senior career*
Years	Team	Apps	(Gls)
1988–1990	Chalatenango		
1990–1994	Atlético Marte		
1994–1996	Águila		
1996–1999	Luis Ángel Firpo		
1999–2000	FAS		

International career^{‡}
1995–1998	El Salvador	42	(2)
- * Club domestic league appearances and goals as of 24 June 2011 ‡ National team caps and goals as of 24 June 2011

Wilfredo Iraheta Sanabria (born February 22, 1967) is a politician and retired Salvadoran football (soccer) player who played as a defender

== Club career ==
Iraheta started playing football in the streets of his hometown and joined then second division side Sesuntepeque at 15 years of age. At 20 he joined Chalatenango and later played for Atlético Marte. In 1994 his father was killed during the civil war and he moved to Águila to play alongside 41-year-old veteran Luis Ramírez Zapata, then Luis Ángel Firpo and FAS with whom he finished playing actively to pursue a career in politics.

Iraheta was a defender whose abilities allowed for great success, also gaining a spot in the national squad on several occasions. He has played in virtually every outfield position. In 2001, he retired from both international and domestic football bringing an end to his career.

== International career ==
Iraheta made his debut for El Salvador in a December 1995 UNCAF Nations Cup match against Costa Rica and has earned a total of 37 caps, scoring 2 goals. He has represented his country in 11 FIFA World Cup qualification matches and played at the 1995 and 1997 UNCAF Nations Cups as well as at the 1996 and 1998 CONCACAF Gold Cups.

His final international match was a November 1998 friendly match against Honduras.

=== International goals ===
Scores and results list El Salvador's goal tally first.

#	Date	Venue	Opponent	Score	Result	Competition
1	10 November 1996	Estadio Cuscatlán, San Salvador, El Salvador	Panama	2-1	3–2	1998 FIFA World Cup qualification
2	7 September 1997	Giants Stadium, East Rutherford, New Jersey, United States	Colombia	2-2	2–2	Friendly match

== Personal life and after retirement ==
Iraheta married Patricia Iraheta and they have four children: William, Maria Jose, Alejandra and Ximena. Since 1995, he has a degree in medicine which earned him the nickname Doctor, and he has also entered into politics.

In February 2011, Iraheta was a candidate to become mayor of San Salvador.

== Honours ==
- Luis Ángel Firpo
  - Primera División de Fútbol Profesional (1): 1998
