= Edgar Estrada =

Guatemalan footballer (born 1967)

Personal information
- Full name: Edgar Eladio Estrada Solís
- Date of birth: November 16, 1967 (age 58)
- Place of birth: Guatemala City, Guatemala
- Position: Goalkeeper

Senior career*
Years	Team	Apps	(Gls)
1987–1994	Aurora		
1995–2001	Comunicaciones	94	(0)
2001–2002	Municipal	43	(0)
2002–2005	Comunicaciones	39	(0)
2005–2006	Suchitepéquez	42	(0)
2007–2008	Petapa	30	(0)

International career
1995–2003	Guatemala	80	(0)
- * Club domestic league appearances and goals

Edgar Eladio Estrada Solís (born November 16, 1967), popularly known as "El Gato" (The Cat), is a Guatemalan former footballer who played as a goalkeeper for several clubs in Guatemala's top division. He was capped 71 times for the Guatemala national team.

== Club career ==
"El Gato" started his professional career at Aurora F.C., winning the domestic league title in the 1992-93 season. He remained there until 1996, when he joined CSD Comunicaciones. He helped that club win four consecutive league titles. In 2001, he signed with CSD Municipal, where he won two more titles. He then had a second stint with Comunicaciones. On May 11, 2003, he scored his first career goal via a penalty kick. He repeated such action one year later, against his former club Aurora.

After having retired due to a spine injury, he surprisingly returned to play in 2005 for Comunicaciones. He then joined Deportivo Suchitepéquez, of whom he was a member until the end of 2006. As of the 2008 Clausura tournament, he was playing for Club Petapa, which he joined in 2007. He retired after that season but in June 2008 it was said he would perhaps continue his career at Deportivo Zacapa.

Estrada was the leading goalkeeper in terms of goals against average in 11 consecutive league tournaments.

== International career ==
Estrada defended the Guatemala national team between 1995 and 2003, appearing in 80 international matches and becoming the most capped player ever for the country, until Juan Carlos Plata surpassed his mark in 2005. Estrada participated in the qualification processes for the 1998 and 2002 World Cups, receiving 25 goals in 20 matches.

In January 2001, after allowing 5 goals in a defeat against Costa Rica, which eliminated Guatemala from the 2002 World Cup qualifying campaign, he was highly criticised, to the extent of receiving death threats. He would not play any other official international matches that year. He appeared in three more official matches for Guatemala, before retiring from the national team in 2003.

Estrada played in three editions of the UNCAF Nations Cup and in five editions of the CONCACAF Gold Cup. He has represented his country in 20 FIFA World Cup qualification matches.
