= Édgar Valencia =

Guatemalan footballer

Personal information
- Full name: Édgar Everaldo Valencia Bobadilla
- Date of birth: March 31, 1971 (age 55)
- Place of birth: Guatemala
- Height: 1.76 m (5 ft 9 1/2 in)
- Positions: Midfielder; right winger

Senior career*
Years	Team	Apps	(Gls)
1991–1993	Galcasa		
1993–1996	Municipal		
1996–2003	Comunicaciones		
2004	Deportivo Heredia	16	(2)
2005	Antigua GFC	18	(0)
2005	CD Suchitepéquez	10	(0)
2006	Antigua GFC		
2008	Deportivo Amatitlán		

International career^{‡}
1991–2003	Guatemala	57	(5)
- * Club domestic league appearances and goals as of 18 July 2010 ‡ National team caps and goals as of 18 July 2010

Édgar Everaldo Valencia Bobadilla (born 31 March 1971) is a retired Guatemalan football midfielder who spent his career playing for several clubs in Guatemala's top division and was also a member of the Guatemala national team.

== Club career ==
Nicknamed el Negro, Valencia started his professional career at Galcasa, then in 1993 he joined Municipal, and later had a lengthy spell at their eternal rivals Comunicaciones. In January 2008, he joined his brother Pedro at then second division side Deportivo Amatitlán, postponing his retirement.

== International career ==
He made his debut for Guatemala in 1991 and earned a total of 57 caps, scoring 5 goals and representing his country in 13 FIFA World Cup qualification matches and playing in several UNCAF Cup tournaments as well as at the 1998, 2000 and 2003 CONCACAF Gold Cups. His final international was an August 2003 friendly match against Ecuador.
