= Wílmer López =

Costa Rican footballer (born 1971)

Wilmer López
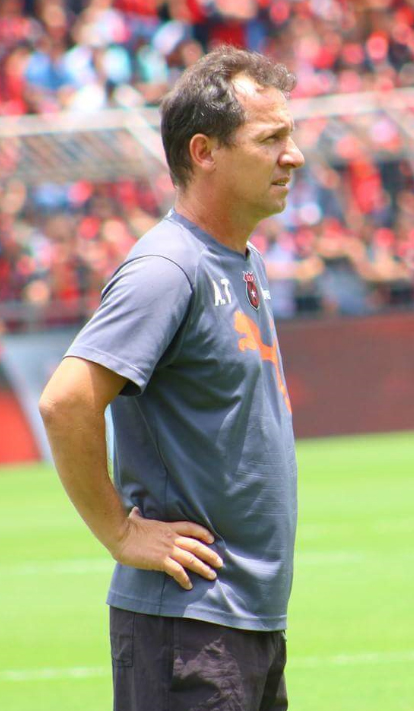
- López as assistant coach of Alajuelense in 2017

Personal information
- Full name: Wilmer López Arguedas
- Date of birth: 3 August 1971 (age 55)
- Place of birth: Alajuela, Costa Rica
- Height: 1.69 m (5 ft 6 1/2 in)
- Position: Midfielder

Youth career
- Carmelita

Senior career*
Years	Team	Apps	(Gls)
1992–1993	Carmelita		(2)
1993–1998	Alajuelense	238	(46)
1998	Tolima	0	(0)
1998–2007	Alajuelense	240	(34)
2007–2008	Pérez Zeledón	14	(1)
2008–2009	Carmelita	18	(1)
Total		550	

International career
1993–2003	Costa Rica	77	(5)

Managerial career
- 2010–2011: Jacó Rays
- 2017–: Alajuelense
- * Club domestic league appearances and goals

Wilmer López Arguedas (born 3 August 1971) is a retired Costa Rican footballer.

He played football for the Costa Rican club Alajuelense and is regarded as one of the club's most notable figures.

== Club career ==
López made his debut in the Costa Rican Primera División on 5 January 1992 playing with Carmelita against ASODELI also scoring his first league goal in that match. The following next season, he was bought by Alajuelense, becoming one of the most beloved players and a crowd favorite, playing 13 seasons and winning 7 Costa Rican Championships, 3 Copa Interclubes UNCAF championships and 1 CONCACAF Champions' Cup, being part of the team that won 4 consecutive national championships (1999 to 2003). He was named the best player of the national tournament for two consecutive seasons before moving to Deportes Tolima in Colombia, whom he left very soon due to contractual problems, and again during another season, when he returned to Costa Rica. He also played the Copa Merconorte and the Copa Sudamericana.

Nicknamed El Pato (The Duck), the midfielder also played for Pérez Zeledón. He is also known as El Ingeniero (The Engineer) due to his ability to create plays with short and long passes and also for his fast thinking that made him one of the best midfielders in the region during the '90s and the early 2000s. After 2003, he suffered multiple injuries that made him lose a lot of games and he never regained his earlier abilities as a player, although he was still loved by the crowd and gave a few good games along the road to the end of the 2007 season when his contract expired and the team decided not to hire him again. It was a sad day for Alajuelense's fans. Every time Pérez Zeledón played at the Alejandro Morera Soto stadium, his former fans waited for him singing and clapping every time he touched the ball, letting him know he still was in their hearts. López totalled 478 league matches and 80 goals for Liga. He also played 92 international club games for them. He played 550 league games in total.

== International career ==
López made his debut for Costa Rica in an August 1995 friendly match against Japan and earned a total of 77 caps, scoring 5 goals. He represented his country in 22 FIFA World Cup qualification matches and played in all 3 games during the 2002 FIFA World Cup held in Korea and Japan. He also played at the 1995 and 1997 UNCAF Nations Cups as well as at the 1998, 2000, 2002 and 2003 CONCACAF Gold Cups and the 1997 Copa América. He also was a non-playing squad member at the 2001 Copa América.

His final international was a July 2003 CONCACAF Gold Cup match against the United States.

== Retirement ==
On Wednesday 22 July 2009, López played his retirement match with Alajuelense against a team of friends that he picked himself. He played the first half with his friends and the second half with Alajuelense to finish the match defending the colors that he loves.

"El Pato" was one of the most loved players in Alajuelense, along with his devotion to "La 12", the official group of Fans. They became more notorious on the day of his retirement, when all the fans jumped into the field to carry him on their shoulders for almost an hour.

== Personal life ==
López is married to Alejandra López and the couple has two sons and a daughter. For a brief period in 2014, her daughter dated the Costa Rican celebrity Andrés Nando Sibaja.

== Career statistics ==
=== International ===
Appearances and goals by national team and year
National team	Year	Apps	Goals
Costa Rica	1993	1	0
Costa Rica	1994	–	
Costa Rica	1995	5	0
Costa Rica	1996	10	1
Costa Rica	1997	17	1
Costa Rica	1998	4	2
Costa Rica	1999	4	0
Costa Rica	2000	7	1
Costa Rica	2001	9	0
Costa Rica	2002	13	0
Costa Rica	2003	7	0
Total		77	5

Scores and results list Costa Rica's goal tally first, score column indicates score after each López goal.

List of international goals scored by Wilmer López
No.	Date	Venue	Opponent	Score	Result	Competition
1	1 December 1996	Estadio Ricardo Saprissa Aymá, San José, Costa Rica	United States	2–0	2–1	1998 FIFA World Cup qualification
2	23 April 1997	Estadio Mateo Flores, Guatemala City, Guatemala	Honduras	3–0	4–0	1997 UNCAF Nations Cup
3	28 January 1998	Estadio Alejandro Morera Soto, Alajuela, Costa Rica	Trinidad and Tobago	4–0	4–0	Friendly
4.	4 February 1998	Oakland Coliseum, Oakland, United States	Cuba	3–0	7–2	1998 CONCACAF Gold Cup
5	26 January 2000	Estadio Ricardo Saprissa Aymá, San José, Costa Rica	Trinidad and Tobago	1–1	2–1	Friendly
