= Allan Oviedo =

Costa Rican footballer (born 1970)

Personal information
- Full name: Allan Fernando Oviedo Rodríguez
- Date of birth: November 8, 1970 (age 55)
- Place of birth: El Llano, Costa Rica
- Height: 1.72 m (5 ft 8 in)
- Position: Forward

Youth career
- 1991: Puntarenense
- 1991–1992: Municipal Puntarenas

Senior career*
Years	Team	Apps	(Gls)
1992–1995	Sagrada Familia		(9)
1995–1996	Belén	43	(20)
1996	FAS		
1996–1997	Herediano	36	(26)
1998–1999	Unión de Curtidores		
1999	Comunicaciones		
2000	Herediano	15	(5)
2000	Tigrillos		
2001–2002	Alajuelense	30	(9)
2002–2003	Cartaginés		(8)
2003–2004	Herediano		(4)
2004	Puntarenas		(5)
2005	Belén		(4)
2005–2006	Brujas		

International career
1996–1999	Costa Rica	26	(7)
- * Club domestic league appearances and goals

Allan Fernando Oviedo Rodríguez (born November 8, 1970) is a retired Costa Rican football striker.

== Club career ==
After winning promotion with the club, Oviedo made his Primera División debut for Sagrada Familia on 3 September 1994 against Turrialba and scored his first goal for them on 24 September 1994 against Limonense. He then joined Belén and in May 1996 he moved abroad to play a month for Salvadoran side FAS. On his return in Costa Rica, he won the 1996–1997 goalscorer award with 26 goals for Herediano only to leave the club in December 1997 when he signed a six-months contract with Mexican second division team Unión de Curtidores. He stayed another year with the club when joined by compatriots Alexander Madrigal and Raymond Harris. Later in 1999 he played for Guatemalan giants Comunicaciones and a half season at Herediano.

In 2001 Oviedo left another Mexican second division side, Tigrillos Nuevo León, and became part of a championship-winning Alajuelense, before moving on to Cartaginés, Puntarenas, Belén and finishing his career at Brujas.

Oviedo totalled 105 Costa Rica premier league goals in his career.

== International career ==
A rather short striker, Oviedo made his debut for Costa Rica in an August 1996 friendly match against Chile and earned a total of 26 caps, scoring 7 goals. He represented his country in 9 FIFA World Cup qualification matches and played at the 1997 UNCAF Nations Cup as well as at the 1998 CONCACAF Gold Cup and the 1997 Copa América.

His final international was an August 1999 friendly match against Uruguay.

=== International goals ===
Scores and results list Costa Rica's goal tally first.

N.	Date	Venue	Opponent	Score	Result	Competition
1.	7 November 1996	Estadio Municipal Pérez Zeledón, San Isidro de El General, Costa Rica	Panama	2–0	2–0	Friendly match
2.	19 February 1997	Estadio Eladio Rosabal Cordero, Heredia, Costa Rica	Venezuela	1–0	5–2	Friendly match
3.	19 February 1997	Estadio Eladio Rosabal Cordero, Heredia, Costa Rica	Venezuela	5–2	5–2	Friendly match
4.	16 April 1997	Estadio Mateo Flores, Guatemala City, Guatemala	Guatemala	1–1	1–1	1997 UNCAF Nations Cup
5.	16 April 1997	Estadio Mateo Flores, Guatemala City, Guatemala	Nicaragua	3–0	5–1	1997 UNCAF Nations Cup
6.	11 May 1997	Estadio Ricardo Saprissa Aymá, San José, Costa Rica	Jamaica	3–1	3–1	1998 FIFA World Cup qualification
7.	7 February 1998	Oakland Coliseum, Oakland, USA	United States	1–1	1–2	1998 CONCACAF Gold Cup

== Personal life ==
He is a son of Fernando Oviedo and Virginia Rodríguez and married to Reyani Miranda López. Allan and Reyani have three children.
