= Martín Machón =

Guatemalan footballer

Personal information
- Full name: Martín Alejandro Machón Guerra
- Date of birth: 4 February 1973 (age 53)
- Place of birth: Santa Catarina Pinula, Guatemala
- Height: 5 ft 8 in (1.73 m)
- Position: Midfielder

Senior career*
Years	Team	Apps	(Gls)
1990–1992	Galcasa FC		
1992–1994	Aurora F.C.		
1993	CD Badajoz		
1994–1997	Comunicaciones		
1997–1998	Los Angeles Galaxy	61	(10)
1999	Santos Laguna	35	(2)
2000	Miami Fusion	24	(2)
2002	Atlas	30	(3)
2002–2006	Comunicaciones	36	(6)

International career^{‡}
1992–2006	Guatemala	60	(5)
- * Club domestic league appearances and goals as of 16 February 2010 ‡ National team caps and goals as of 16 February 2010

Martín Alejandro Machón Guerra (born 4 February 1973) is a Guatemalan former professional footballer.

He played mostly in the midfield for local club Comunicaciones and Major League Soccer clubs Los Angeles Galaxy and Miami Fusion, and also became a member of the Guatemala national team, which he represented during three World Cup qualification processes.

== Club career ==
Born in Santa Catarina Pinula, Machón was scouted by top-level club Galcasa FC, now defunct, and debuted in the Liga Mayor with them in the 1990–91 season, scoring twice in his first match against Xelajú MC. He then joined Aurora F.C., and while at that team, he was first called up to the national team.

In 1993, he had a call-up from Spanish Segunda División team CD Badajoz, where he trained for a brief period but did not go on to play-officially.

After his return from Spain, Machón spent another year at Aurora, and in 1994 he joined Comunicaciones, where he had a successful time as he helped the team win league titles in the 1994–95 and 1996–97 seasons.

=== Years abroad: MLS and Mexico ===
In 1997, Machón became the second Guatemalan footballer after Jorge Rodas to sign for a team of the U.S. Major League Soccer, when Los Angeles Galaxy brought him to their roster. He played the 1997 and 1998 seasons at Galaxy, and during the latter, he scored 6 goals and made 14 assists, which earned him participation at the 1998 MLS All-Star Game. He also helped the team reach the playoffs in both seasons.

Machón was loaned in December 1998 to México Primera División side Santos Laguna, where he played for one year before returning to the MLS, this time to play for Miami Fusion, where in spite of his team's struggles he had a positive 2000 season, making 16 assists in 24 matches. The following year he had his second stint with a Mexican club, joining Atlas and spending two seasons there.

=== Later playing years and retirement ===
After his second period playing in Mexico, Machón re-joined his former team Comunicaciones, where he remained until 2006. During the 2004–05 season and part of the 2005 Apertura tournament, he could not play due to a knee injury. He retired at the end of the 2006 Apertura season, and in February 2007 he was one of several former players to participate in a friendly match in Guatemala City to honor Diego Maradona. As of January 2008, he was a radio commentator and entrepreneur. He also has been working with the organization DGEF in Guatemala. DGEF is an organization that helps young children get physically active. What he does helps children do physical activities and complements their academic training.

== International career (1992–2006) ==
Machón made his debut for Guatemala in a May 1992 friendly match against Ecuador and has earned a total of 60 caps, scoring 5 goals. Machón represented the Guatemalan team in the qualification rounds for the World Cups of 1994, 1998, and 2002. He also was part of the national squads that competed at the CONCACAF Gold Cups of 1996, 1998, 2000, and 2003. At the 1998 Gold Cup, his corner kick provided the assist in Juan Carlos Plata's goal against Brazil on which Guatemala achieved a surprise draw with the then world champions.

Machón played his last international match in February 2006 against the United States.

=== International goals ===
Scores and results list. Guatemala's goal tally first.

#	Date	Venue	Opponent	Score	Result	Competition
1	16 January 1996	Edison International Field, Anaheim, USA	Saint Vincent and the Grenadines	3–0	3–0	CONCACAF Gold Cup
2	20 April 1997	Estadio Mateo Flores, Guatemala City, Guatemala	Nicaragua	1–0	6–1	Continental qualifier
3	7 November 1997	Estadio Regional, Antofagasta, Chile	Chile	1–3	1–4	Friendly match
4	17 February 1999	Estadio Mateo Flores, Guatemala City, Guatemala	Chile	1–1	1–1	Friendly match
5	28 March 1999	Estadio Nacional, San José, Costa Rica	Honduras	2–0	2–0	Continental qualifier

== Honors ==
Individual

- MLS All-Star, 1998

== See also ==
- List of foreign MLS players
