= 1996 CONCACAF Gold Cup =

3rd edition of the CONCACAF Gold Cup

CONCACAF Championship
- 1996 CONCACAF Gold Cup official logo

Tournament details
- Host country: United States
- Dates: January 10–21
- Teams: 9 (from 2 confederations)
- Venues: 3 (in 3 host cities)

Final positions
- Champions: Mexico (2nd title)
- Runners-up: Brazil
- Third place: United States
- Fourth place: Guatemala

Tournament statistics
- Matches played: 13
- Goals scored: 42 (3.23 per match)
- Attendance: 487,439 (37,495 per match)
- Top scorer: (United States) Eric Wynalda (4 goals)

The 1996 CONCACAF Gold Cup was the third edition of the Gold Cup, the soccer championship of North America, Central America and the Caribbean (CONCACAF).

The tournament returned to the United States and California; the games were hosted by Los Angeles, San Diego, and Anaheim. The format of the tournament changed from 1993: it was expanded to nine teams, separated into three groups of three and played in January as opposed to the 1993 edition which was played in July.

The top team in each group, plus the best second-place finisher would advance to the semifinals. For the first time, a non-CONCACAF team was invited: Brazil, who sent their under-23 side. Mexico won their second straight Gold Cup, beating the Brazilians 2–0 in the final.

== Venues ==
Anaheim	Los Angeles	San Diego
Anaheim Stadium	Memorial Coliseum	Jack Murphy Stadium
Capacity: 64,593	Capacity: 93,607	Capacity: 60,836
1996 CONCACAF Gold Cup is located in the United States

== Teams ==
=== Qualification ===
Team	Qualification	Appearances	Last Appearance	Previous best performance	FIFA Ranking
North American zone
Mexico (TH)	Automatic	3rd	1993	Champions (1993)	12
United States	Automatic	3rd	1993	Champions (1991)	19
Canada	Automatic	3rd	1993	Group Stage (1991, 1993)	65
Caribbean zone qualified through the 1995 Caribbean Cup
Trinidad and Tobago	Winners	2nd	1991	Group Stage (1991)	57
Saint Vincent and the Grenadines	Runners-up	1st	None	Debut	95
Central American zone qualified through the 1995 UNCAF Nations Cup
Honduras	Winners	3rd	1993	Runners-up (1991)	49
Guatemala	Runners-up	2nd	1991	Group stage (1991)	145
El Salvador	Third Place	1st	None	Debut	85
Other
Brazil (Note: U-23 represented)	Invitation	1st	None	Debut	1

=== Squads ===
The 9 national teams involved in the tournament were required to register a squad of 20 players; only players in these squads were eligible to take part in the tournament.

== Group stage ==
=== Group A ===
Pos	Team	Pld	W	D	L	GF	GA	GD	Pts	Qualification
1	Mexico	2	2	0	0	6	0	+6	6	Advanced to knockout stage
2	Guatemala	2	1	0	1	3	1	+2	3	Advanced to knockout stage
3	Saint Vincent and the Grenadines	2	0	0	2	0	8	−8	0	

Source: CONCACAF
11 January 1996

Mexico	5–0	Saint Vincent and the Grenadines
L. García 29', 37'; Peláez 70', 90'; A. Garcia 80'	Report

Jack Murphy Stadium, San Diego
Attendance: 15,352
Referee: Esfandiar Baharmast (United States)

14 January 1996

Mexico	1–0	Guatemala
Rizo 88'	Report

Jack Murphy Stadium, San Diego
Attendance: 32,571
Referee: Ronald Gutiérrez (Costa Rica)

16 January 1996

Saint Vincent and the Grenadines	0–3	Guatemala
	Report	Funes 28'; Westphal 42'; Machón 45'

Anaheim Stadium, Anaheim
Attendance: 52,345
Referee: Peter Prendergast (Jamaica)

=== Group B ===
Pos	Team	Pld	W	D	L	GF	GA	GD	Pts	Qualification
1	Brazil	2	2	0	0	9	1	+8	6	Advance to Knockout stage
2	Canada	2	1	0	1	4	5	−1	3	
3	Honduras	2	0	0	2	1	8	−7	0	

January 10, 1996

Canada	3–1	Honduras
Corazzin 9'; Holness 27', 63'	Report	Carson 40'

Anaheim Stadium, Anaheim
Attendance: 27,125
Referee: Peter Prendergast (Jamaica)

January 12, 1996

Brazil	4–1	Canada
André Luis 3'; Caio 7'; Sávio 14'; Leandro Machado 86'	Report	Radzinski 66'

Los Angeles Memorial Coliseum, Los Angeles
Attendance: 8,234
Referee: Ronald Gutiérrez (Costa Rica)

January 14, 1996

Brazil	5–0	Honduras
Caio 9', 81'; Jamelli 31', 61'; Sávio 80'	Report

Los Angeles Memorial Coliseum, Los Angeles
Attendance: 20,708
Referee: Armando Archundia (Mexico)

=== Group C ===
Pos	Team	Pld	W	D	L	GF	GA	GD	Pts	Qualification
1	United States	2	2	0	0	5	2	+3	6	Advance to Knockout stage
2	El Salvador	2	1	0	1	3	4	−1	3	
3	Trinidad and Tobago	2	0	0	2	4	6	−2	0	

January 10, 1996

Trinidad and Tobago	2–3	El Salvador
Latapy 59', 64'	Report	Díaz Arce 34', 72' (pen.); Cerritos 50'

Anaheim Stadium, Anaheim
Attendance: 27,125
Referee: Armando Archundia (Mexico)

January 13, 1996

United States	3–2	Trinidad and Tobago
Wynalda 15', 34'; Moore 53'	Report	Dwarika 6', 43'

Anaheim Stadium, Anaheim
Attendance: 12,425
Referee: Argelio Sabillon (Honduras)

January 16, 1996

United States	2–0	El Salvador
Wynalda 63'; Balboa 75'	Report

Anaheim Stadium, Anaheim
Attendance: 52,345
Referee: Ramesh Ramdhan (Trinidad and Tobago)

== Knockout stage ==
=== Bracket ===
Semi-finals
18 January – Los Angeles
United States	0
Brazil	1
19 January – San Diego
Mexico	1
Guatemala	0

Final
21 January – Los Angeles
Brazil	0
Mexico	2
Third place play-off
21 January – Los Angeles
United States	3
Guatemala	0

=== Semi-finals ===
18 January 1996

United States	0–1	Brazil
	Report	Balboa 79' (o.g.)

Los Angeles Memorial Coliseum, Los Angeles
Attendance: 20,708
Referee: Armando Archundia (Mexico)

19 January 1996

Mexico	1–0	Guatemala
Blanco 64'	Report

Jack Murphy Stadium, San Diego
Attendance: 42,221
Referee: Esfandiar Baharmast (United States)

=== Third place play-off ===
21 January 1996

United States	3–0	Guatemala
Wynalda 34'; Agoos 37'; Kirovski 87'	Report

Los Angeles Memorial Coliseum, Los Angeles
Attendance: 88,155
Referee: René Parra (Canada)

=== Final ===
21 January 1996

Brazil	0–2	Mexico
	Report	L. García 54'; Blanco 75'

Los Angeles Memorial Coliseum, Los Angeles
Attendance: 88,155
Referee: Ramesh Ramdhan (Trinidad and Tobago)

== Statistics ==
=== Goalscorers ===
There were 42 goals scored in 13 matches, for an average of 3.23 goals per match.

4 goals

- (United States) Eric Wynalda

3 goals

- (Brazil) Caio Ribeiro
- (Mexico) Luis García

2 goals

- (Brazil) Paulo Jamelli
- (Brazil) Sávio
- (Canada) Kevin Holness
- (El Salvador) Raúl Díaz Arce
- (Mexico) Cuauhtémoc Blanco
- (Mexico) Ricardo Peláez
- (Trinidad and Tobago) Arnold Dwarika
- (Trinidad and Tobago) Russell Latapy

1 goal

- (Brazil) Leandro Machado
- (Brazil) André Luiz Moreira
- (Canada) Carlo Corazzin
- (Canada) Tomasz Radzinski
- (El Salvador) Ronald Cerritos
- (Guatemala) Juan Manuel Funes
- (Guatemala) Martín Machón
- (Guatemala) Edwin Westphal
- (Honduras) Presley Carson
- (Mexico) Agustín Garcia
- (Mexico) Eustacio Rizo
- (United States) Jeff Agoos
- (United States) Marcelo Balboa
- (United States) Jovan Kirovski
- (United States) Joe-Max Moore

1 own goal

- (United States) Marcelo Balboa (against Brazil)

== Awards ==
The following Gold Cup awards were given at the conclusion of the tournament: the Golden Boot (top scorer) and Golden Ball (best overall player).

Golden Ball
(Mexico) Raúl Lara
Golden Boot
(United States) Eric Wynalda
4 goals
