= Harold Wallace =

Costa Rican footballer (born 1975)

Personal information
- Full name: Harold Wallace McDonald
- Date of birth: 7 September 1975 (age 51)
- Place of birth: Heredia, Costa Rica
- Height: 1.75 m (5 ft 9 in)
- Positions: Right-back; central midfielder

Senior career*
Years	Team	Apps	(Gls)
1993–1994	Saprissa	15	(1)
1994–1995	Belén	14	(0)
1995	Zacatepec	6	(0)
1995–2002	Alajuelense	268	(15)
2002–2003	→ San Luis (loan)	29	(2)
2003–2008	Alajuelense	156	(8)
2008–2010	Liberia Mía	51	(3)
Total		539	(29)

International career
1995–2009	Costa Rica	101	(3)

Managerial career
- 2014–2015: Costa Rica U-20
- 2019: A.D. San Carlos (Assistant)
- 2019-2021: Costa Rica U-15
- 2021: LD Alajuelense (Assistant)
- 2022-2023: Pérez Zeledón (Assistant)
- 2023-2024: A.D. San Carlos (Assistant)
- 2024-2025: Sporting F.C. (Assistant)
- 2025 - Present: Inter FA (Assistant)
- * Club domestic league appearances and goals

Harold Wallace McDonald (born September 7, 1975) is a Costa Rican former footballer who played as a right-back and central midfielder.

== Club career ==
He started his career with Deportivo Saprissa, being part of their minor league system. After a season with Saprissa and then Belén, he was transferred alongside compatriot Jewisson Bennett to Zacatepec, of Mexico's professional football league. He then came back and signed with Saprissa's arch-rivals Alajuelense, earning a place in the starting line-up really quick and remained with the team for 7 years. From 2002, he spent a year on loan playing for San Luis in the Mexican Primera División before making a second return to Alajuelense. He later withdraw a lawsuit against his club, after claiming part of the transfer fee paid by San Luis to Alajuelense. He would end up playing a total of 424 league games and 80 international games for Liga.

In summer 2008 Wallace joined other high-profile players at ambitious Liberia Mía and he retired in summer 2010 after playing his final two seasons at the then renamed Águilas Guanacastecas.

== International career ==
Wallace was a member of Costa Rica's youth national teams, playing in the 1995 FIFA World Youth Championship finals in the Qatar.

He made his senior debut for Costa Rica in a September 1995 friendly match against Jamaica and earned a total of 101 caps, scoring 3 goals. He represented his country in 28 FIFA World Cup qualification matches and played in the 2002 and 2006 FIFA World Cups. He also played at two Copa América tournaments, four CONCACAF Gold Cups and three UNCAF Nations Cups.

His final international was an August 2009 FIFA World Cup qualification match against Honduras, after reaching a century of caps in his previous game against Mexico.

=== International goals ===
Scores and results list. Costa Rica's goal tally first.

#	Date	Venue	Opponent	Score	Result	Competition
1.	13 February 2000	Qualcomm Stadium, San Diego, United States	Canada	2–1	2–2	2000 CONCACAF Gold Cup
2.	4 February 2007	Estadio Alejandro Morera Soto, Alajuela, Costa Rica	Trinidad and Tobago	1–0	4–0	Friendly match
3.	16 February 2007	Estadio Cuscatlán, San Salvador, El Salvador	El Salvador	1–0	2–0	2007 UNCAF Nations Cup

== Managerial career ==
In July 2014, Wallace and Pablo Sanz took the reins of the Costa Rica national under-20 football team after coach Rónald "Macho" Mora was sacked.

== See also ==
- List of men's footballers with 100 or more international caps
