= 1997 UNCAF Nations Cup =

Tournament details
- Host country: Guatemala
- Dates: 28 March – 27 April 1997
- Teams: 7 (from 1 sub-confederation)

Final positions
- Champions: Costa Rica (2nd title)
- Runners-up: Guatemala
- Third place: El Salvador
- Fourth place: Honduras

Tournament statistics
- Matches played: 14
- Goals scored: 37 (2.64 per match)
- Attendance: 172,175 (12,298 per match)
- Top scorer(s): (Honduras) Wilmer Velásquez (6 goals)

This page details the 1997 UNCAF Nations Cup, played in Guatemala.

== Squads ==
For a complete list of all participating squads see UNCAF Nations Cup 1997 squads

== Preliminary round ==
March 23, 1997

| Panama | 1–1 | Belize |
|---|---|---|
| Ávila 69' | | Prat 78' |

Estadio Rommel Fernández, Panama City
Attendance: 10,000
March 30, 1997

| Belize | 0–1 | Panama |
|---|---|---|
| | | Guevara 13' |

Norman Broaster Stadium, San Ignacio Cayo
Attendance: 6,000

== Participating teams ==
6 UNCAF teams participated in the tournament

- Costa Rica
- El Salvador
- Guatemala (Hosts)
- Honduras (Defending Champions)
- Nicaragua (Debut)
- Panama (Preliminary round) winners

== Venue ==
Guatemala City
Estadio Mateo Flores
Capacity: 26,000
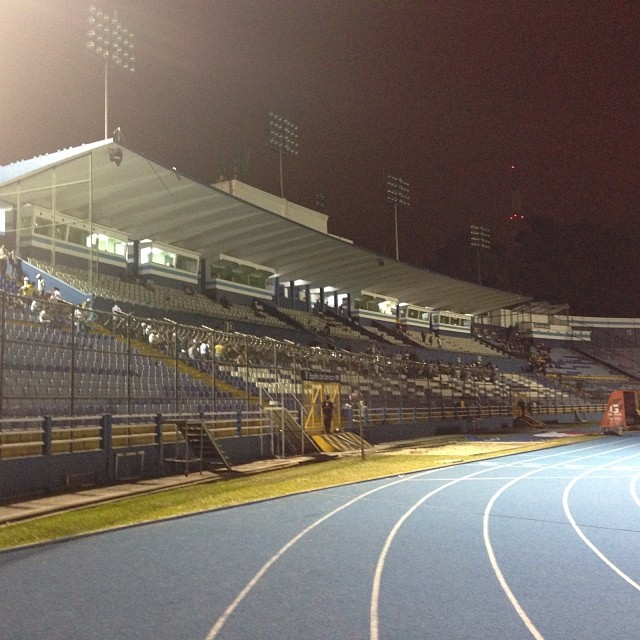

== First round ==
=== Group A ===
| Pos | Team | Pld | W | D | L | GF | GA | GD | Pts | Qualification |
|---|---|---|---|---|---|---|---|---|---|---|
| 1 | Guatemala | 2 | 1 | 1 | 0 | 7 | 2 | +5 | 4 | Qualified to Final Round |
| 2 | Costa Rica | 2 | 1 | 1 | 0 | 6 | 2 | +4 | 4 | Qualified to Final Round |
| 3 | Nicaragua | 2 | 0 | 0 | 2 | 2 | 11 | −9 | 0 | |

16 April 1997

| Guatemala | 1–1 | Costa Rica |
|---|---|---|
| Plata 7' | | Oviedo 43' |

Estadio Mateo Flores, Guatemala City
Attendance: 15,975

18 April 1997

| Costa Rica | 5–1 | Nicaragua |
|---|---|---|
| Arnáez 13'; Ramírez 18', 42', 48'; Oviedo 39' | | Taylor 55' |

Estadio Mateo Flores, Guatemala City
Attendance: 2,000

20 April 1997

| Guatemala | 6–1 | Nicaragua |
|---|---|---|
| Machón 2'; Plata 5', 40' (pen.); Westphal 13'; Funes 63'; Samayoa 75' | | Bermúdez 31' |

Estadio Mateo Flores, Guatemala City
Attendance: 18,500

=== Group B ===
| Pos | Team | Pld | W | D | L | GF | GA | GD | Pts | Qualification |
|---|---|---|---|---|---|---|---|---|---|---|
| 1 | Honduras | 2 | 2 | 0 | 0 | 8 | 0 | +8 | 6 | Qualified to Final Round |
| 2 | El Salvador | 2 | 1 | 0 | 1 | 2 | 3 | −1 | 3 | Qualified to Final Round |
| 3 | Panama | 2 | 0 | 0 | 2 | 0 | 7 | −7 | 0 | |

16 April 1997

| Honduras | 5–0 | Panama |
|---|---|---|
| Velásquez 1', 11', 16', 45' (pen.); Guevara 73' |

Estadio Mateo Flores, Guatemala City
Attendance: 8,000

18 April 1997

| Honduras | 3–0 | El Salvador |
|---|---|---|
| Velásquez 4', 25' (pen.); Núñez 78' |

Estadio Mateo Flores, Guatemala City
Attendance: 8,000

20 April 1997

| El Salvador | 2–0 | Panama |
|---|---|---|
| Montes 63'; Guerra 77' |

Estadio Mateo Flores, Guatemala City
Attendance: 10,000

== Final round ==
| Pos | Team | Pld | W | D | L | GF | GA | GD | Pts | Status |
|---|---|---|---|---|---|---|---|---|---|---|
| 1 | Costa Rica | 3 | 2 | 1 | 0 | 6 | 1 | +5 | 7 | Champion |
| 2 | Guatemala | 3 | 2 | 1 | 0 | 3 | 1 | +2 | 7 | Runners-up |
| 3 | El Salvador | 3 | 0 | 1 | 2 | 0 | 2 | −2 | 1 | Third Place |
| 4 | Honduras | 3 | 0 | 1 | 2 | 0 | 5 | −5 | 1 | |

23 April 1997

| Honduras | 0–4 | Costa Rica |
|---|---|---|
| | | Fonseca 5', 8', 71'; López 44' |

Estadio Mateo Flores, Guatemala City
Attendance: 12,000
23 April 1997

| Guatemala | 1–0 | El Salvador |
|---|---|---|
| Funes 55' |

Estadio Mateo Flores, Guatemala City
Attendance: 15,975

25 April 1997

| Guatemala | 1–0 | Honduras |
|---|---|---|
| Plata 50' |

Estadio Mateo Flores, Guatemala City
Attendance: 17,000
25 April 1997

| Costa Rica | 1–0 | El Salvador |
|---|---|---|
| Arnáez 72' |

Estadio Mateo Flores, Guatemala City
Attendance: 4,000

27 April 1997

| Honduras | 0–0 | El Salvador |

Estadio Mateo Flores, Guatemala City
Attendance: 15,000
27 April 1997

| Costa Rica | 1–1 | Guatemala |
|---|---|---|
| Fonseca 2' | | Funes 87' |

Estadio Mateo Flores, Guatemala City
Attendance: 29,725

== Champions ==
1997 UNCAF Nations Cup winner

Costa Rica
Second title

- Costa Rica, Guatemala, El Salvador and Honduras qualified automatically for 1998 CONCACAF Gold Cup.

== All-star team ==
- (Costa Rica) Erick Lonnis
- (Costa Rica) Harold Wallace
- (Costa Rica) Mauricio Wright
- (El Salvador) Wilfredo Iraheta
- (Guatemala) Martín Machón
- (Guatemala) Juan Manuel Funes
- (Costa Rica) Luis Diego Arnáez
- (Honduras) Amado Guevara
- (Guatemala) Juan Carlos Plata
- (Costa Rica) Rolando Fonseca
- (Honduras) Wilmer Velásquez
