= Juan Manuel Funes =

Guatemalan footballer (born 1966)

Personal information
- Full name: Juan Manuel Funes Fernández
- Date of birth: May 16, 1966 (age 60)
- Place of birth: Guatemala City, Guatemala
- Position: Midfielder

Youth career
- Aurora

Senior career*
Years	Team	Apps	(Gls)
1983–1986	Aurora	53	(4)
1986–1997	Municipal		
1997–2001	Comunicaciones	21	(3)
2001–2003	Jalapa	31	(4)
2003–2005	Aurora	20	(0)

International career
1985–2000	Guatemala	66	(15)

Managerial career
- 2021–2022: Santa Lucía
- * Club domestic league appearances and goals

Juan Manuel Funes Fernández (born May 16, 1966), popularly known as Memín Funes is a Guatemalan football coach and former midfielder who played professionally for the three most successful clubs in Guatemala – Aurora F.C., Municipal, and Comunicaciones – and became a member and later captain of the Guatemala national team, which he represented in five World Cup qualification processes. He was recently manager for Liga Nacional club Santa Lucía.

As of October 2006, he was part of the coaching staff of the Guatemala under-17 team.

== Club career ==
As a teenager, Funes was part of the youth divisions of Aurora F.C., debuting in the Liga Mayor with that team. He then joined Municipal – the club he would permanently be most identified with –, where he would reach the peak of his career. During his tenure with the Rojos, Funes helped the team win three consecutive league titles in the 1987, 1988, and 1989–90 seasons, and two more in 1991–92 and 1993–94. He scored 43 goals in official tournaments for Municipal.

In 1997, Funes moved to Municipal's arch-rivals Comunicaciones, where he won four more league titles: 1997, 1999, Apertura 1999, and Clausura 2001. In 2001, he joined Deportivo Jalapa. After that he played a second tenure with Aurora, and after the team was relegated to Primera División in 2005, he retired from professional football.

A creative midfielder, Funes' play was characterized by good ball control, field vision, dribbling, and mobility. Although he was not a high-scoring midfielder, he would constantly create scoring chances for teammates in attack.

== International career ==
Funes was part of the Guatemala youth squad that won the gold medal at the III Juegos Centroamericanos in 1986. In 1988, he was part of the squad that participated at the 1988 Olympic tournament, playing against Italy and Iraq.

At the full international level, he made 66 appearances from 1985 to 2000, scoring 15 goals. He was also the national team captain from 1994 to 2000. Funes participated in the 1986, 1990, 1994, 1998, and 2002 World Cup qualifying campaigns, becoming the first Guatemalan player ever to participate in five such processes. This record was tied in 2015 by Carlos Ruiz.

He was selected to the All-star team of the 1997 UNCAF Nations Cup tournament, where Guatemala finished in second place. His last international match was a September 2000 World Cup qualification match against the United States.
