= Juan Carlos Plata =

Guatemalan footballer (born 1971)

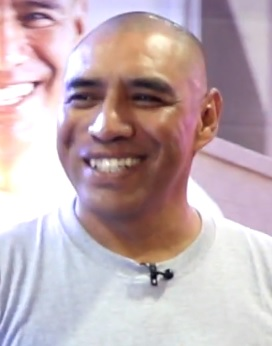
- Plata in 2019

Personal information
- Full name: Juan Carlos Plata
- Date of birth: 1 January 1971 (age 55)
- Place of birth: Guatemala City, Guatemala
- Height: 1.70 m (5 ft 7 in)
- Position: Forward

Senior career*
Years	Team	Apps	(Gls)
1988–2011	Municipal	553	(302)

International career^{‡}
1996–2010	Guatemala	87	(35)

Managerial career
- 2017: Mixco
- * Club domestic league appearances and goals as of 4 March 2010 ‡ National team caps and goals as of 4 March 2011

Juan Carlos Plata (born 1 January 1971), nicknamed El Pin or Pin Plata, is a Guatemalan professional football manager and former player who played as a striker. He is the highest-scoring player in the history of Guatemala's top division. As of January 2010, Plata has, except for Marc Lloyd-Williams, been the most prolific scorer among all active players in the world in top division leagues, and is among the top 60 goalscorers of all time in the world according to the International Federation of Football History & Statistics.

He is also the second-highest goalscorer in the history of the Guatemala national team behind Carlos Ruiz.

Plata played all of his professional club career for C.S.D. Municipal and is also the all-time top goalscorer for that club; he has broken virtually every scoring record associated with professional football in Guatemala. He also has won 15 domestic league titles, 5 domestic cup titles, and 2 international titles playing for Municipal.

== Playing style ==
Plata's playing style focuses more on technique rather than physical prowess, utilizing skills such as a strong sense of positioning and playing without the ball. In addition to being recognized as a finisher, he was also known to be a creative playmaker and passer. His personal-best 33 goals in one season came at age 35.

== Club career ==
Plata, born in Guatemala City, made his debut in the Liga Mayor (Major League, now Liga Nacional) in the 1988–1989 league season, won by Municipal, under coach Rubén Amorín. He has since been a regular for the club, and has helped them win 14 league titles, 5 domestic cups, and 2 Central American championships.

A consistent goalscorer throughout his career, Plata has scored at least 15 goals in 13 different seasons, with his most prolific season in terms of total goals scored being 2005–2006, when he scored 32 goals in total for both the Torneo de Apertura and the Torneo de Clausura.

On 15 February 2008, Plata played his 500th official match with Municipal against Deportivo Zacapa for the domestic league. On 17 May 2009, Plata scored his 400th career goal against Deportivo Petapa.

=== Notable goals ===
Plata holds the domestic record for most goals scored in finals. Some of his most memorable performances include scoring 4 goals in a 9–2 beatdown over rival team CSD Comunicaciones in the Apertura 2004 final. He also scored 2 late goals in the Apertura 2005 championship over Comunicaciones to win the title. In the Clausura 2005 final, he scored a record 4 goals in one game against CD Suchitepequez to win another title. His latest final was against Xelajú MC in the Clausura 2010 tournament, coming in as a late substitute after being inactive for the majority of the tournament due to a major injury and scoring a header which gave Municipal its third goal in an eventual 3–1 victory. In the second game he again came in as a late substitute and again scored a goal to add a second goal to a 7–1 aggregate victory and his fifteenth league title with Municipal.

He also holds the domestic record of most goals scored in the Guatemalan derby (Municipal vs. Comunicaciones) with 39, all scored with Municipal against Comunicaciones. Further, he holds the record for most goals scored in international club competitions by a Guatemalan with 33.

== International career ==
He made his debut for Guatemala as a second half substitute for Jorge Rodas in a January 1996 CONCACAF Gold Cup match against Mexico and scored 35 international goals in 86 international matches. He played in the World Cup qualification processes of 1998, 2002 and 2006, scoring 7 goals in 27 World Cup qualification matches, including 2 in a 2–1 win against Costa Rica on 5 September 2004 that helped Guatemala advance to the final stage of the 2006 CONCACAF World Cup qualification.

On 21 January 2002 he scored his 26th goal with the national team, against Mexico at the 2002 Gold Cup, surpassing the record of 25 that had been held by Carlos Toledo since 1953. Plata's most famous goal with the national team, however, might be the one he scored in the dying seconds of the 1998 CONCACAF Gold Cup match against Brazil, a header from a corner kick to equalize the score 1–1, a very surprising result considering Brazil were the reigning world champions at the time and fielded stars like Romario, Mauro Silva, Edmundo, Denilson and Taffarel.

El Pin retired from international play in 2006, after a friendly match against Panama. He did however earn a final cap in a testimonial match against Belize on 9 October 2010 in which he came on as a second-half substitute.

== Career statistics ==
=== International goals ===
Scores and results list Guatemala's goal tally first, score column indicates score after each Plata goal.

List of international goals scored by Juan Carlos Plata
No.	Date	Venue	Opponent	Score	Result	Competition	Ref.
1	27 March 1996	Estadio Doroteo Guamuch Flores, Guatemala City, Guatemala	Venezuela	1–0	3–0	Friendly	
2	27 March 1996	Estadio Doroteo Guamuch Flores, Guatemala City, Guatemala	Venezuela	2–0	3–0	Friendly	
3	23 April 1996	Los Angeles Memorial Coliseum, Los Angeles, United States	El Salvador	–	2–1	Friendly	
4	5 May 1996	Estadio Cacique Diriangén, Diriamba, Nicaragua	Nicaragua	1–0	1–0	1998 FIFA World Cup qualification	
5	10 May 1996	Estadio Doroteo Guamuch Flores, Guatemala City, Guatemala	Nicaragua	1–0	2–1	1998 FIFA World Cup qualification	
6	10 May 1996	Estadio Doroteo Guamuch Flores, Guatemala City, Guatemala	Nicaragua	2–0	2–1	1998 FIFA World Cup qualification	
7	18 August 1996	Weingart Stadium, Monterey Park, United States	Honduras	1–0	1–1	Friendly	
8	24 November 1996	Los Angeles Memorial Coliseum, Los Angeles, United States	Costa Rica	1–0	1–0	1998 FIFA World Cup qualification	
9	21 December 1996	Estadio Cuscatlán, San Salvador, El Salvador	United States	2–1	2–2	1998 FIFA World Cup qualification	
10	19 February 1997	Valley Children's Stadium, Fresno, United States	Mexico	1–1	1–1	Friendly	
11	16 April 1997	Estadio Doroteo Guamuch Flores, Guatemala City, Guatemala	Costa Rica	1–0	1–1	1997 UNCAF Nations Cup	
12	20 April 1997	Estadio Doroteo Guamuch Flores, Guatemala City, Guatemala	Nicaragua	2–0	6–1	1997 UNCAF Nations Cup	
13	20 April 1997	Estadio Doroteo Guamuch Flores, Guatemala City, Guatemala	Nicaragua	4–1	6–1	1997 UNCAF Nations Cup	
14	25 April 1997	Estadio Doroteo Guamuch Flores, Guatemala City, Guatemala	Honduras	1–0	1–0	1997 UNCAF Nations Cup	
15	5 February 1998	Miami Orange Bowl, Miami, United States	Brazil	1–1	1–1	1998 CONCACAF Gold Cup	
16	8 February 1998	Los Angeles Memorial Coliseum, Los Angeles, United States	Jamaica	1–0	2–3	1998 CONCACAF Gold Cup	
17	17 November 1998	Los Angeles Memorial Coliseum, Los Angeles, United States	Honduras	2–1	3–3	Friendly	
18	18 November 1998	Los Angeles Memorial Coliseum, Los Angeles, United States	Mexico	1–1	2–2	Friendly	
19	18 November 1998	Los Angeles Memorial Coliseum, Los Angeles, United States	Mexico	2–1	2–2	Friendly	
20	15 February 2000	Los Angeles Memorial Coliseum, Los Angeles, United States	Trinidad and Tobago	1–1	2–4	2000 CONCACAF Gold Cup	
21	7 May 2000	Estadio Cuscatlán, San Salvador, El Salvador	El Salvador	1–0	1–1	2002 FIFA World Cup qualification	
22	17 June 2000	Estadio Doroteo Guamuch Flores, Guatemala City, Guatemala	Antigua and Barbuda	4–0	8–1	2002 FIFA World Cup qualification	
23	17 June 2000	Estadio Doroteo Guamuch Flores, Guatemala City, Guatemala	Antigua and Barbuda	6–1	8–1	2002 FIFA World Cup qualification	
24	3 July 2000	Montreal, Canada	Haiti	1–0	4–1	Friendly	
25	20 January 2002	Rose Bowl, Pasadena, United States	Mexico	1–1	1–3	2002 CONCACAF Gold Cup	
26	8 July 2003	Reliant Stadium, Houston, United States	El Salvador	1–0	2–1	Friendly	
27	4 September 2004	Estadio Doroteo Guamuch Flores, Guatemala City, Guatemala	Costa Rica	1–1	2–1	2006 FIFA World Cup qualification	
28	4 September 2004	Estadio Doroteo Guamuch Flores, Guatemala City, Guatemala	Costa Rica	2–1	2–1	2006 FIFA World Cup qualification	
29	2 October 2004	Lockhart Stadium, Fort Lauderdale, United States	Jamaica	1–0	2–2	Friendly	
30	19 February 2005	Estadio Doroteo Guamuch Flores, Guatemala City, Guatemala	Belize	2–0	2–0	2005 UNCAF Nations Cup	
31	21 February 2005	Estadio Doroteo Guamuch Flores, Guatemala City, Guatemala	Nicaragua	1–0	4–0	2005 UNCAF Nations Cup	
32	27 February 2005	Estadio Doroteo Guamuch Flores, Guatemala City, Guatemala	Panama	2–0	3–0	2005 UNCAF Nations Cup	
33	27 February 2005	Estadio Doroteo Guamuch Flores, Guatemala City, Guatemala	Panama	3–0	3–0	2005 UNCAF Nations Cup	
34	1 October 2005	Lockhart Stadium, Fort Lauderdale, United States	Jamaica	1–1	1–2	Friendly	

== Coaching career ==
He started his coaching career in October 2012 as an assistant coach for Ramon Maradiaga in CSD Municipal, and continued in the assistant coach position in the club until December 2015. In January 2016 he joined Walter Claveri to be assistant coach for Guatemala's National Team.

In March 2017 he made his debut as coach with CSD Mixco in the Primera Division de Ascenso.

== Honours ==
Municipal

- Liga Nacional de Guatemala: 1992, 1994, Apertura 2000, Clausura 2000, Apertura 2001, Clausura 2002, Apertura 2003, Apertura 2004, Clausura 2005, Apertura 2005, Clausura 2006, Apertura 2006, Clausura 2008, Apertura 2009, Clausura 2010
- Domestic Cup: 1994, 1995, 1998, 2003, 2004
- UNCAF Interclub Cup: 2001, 2004

Individual

- Liga Nacional de Fútbol de Guatemala Top Goalscorer: 1996, 2005

Orders

- Order of the Quetzal: 2009

== Biography on film ==
Juan Carlos Plata's career received a tribute with the release in Guatemala of his biographic documentary film 321: Juan Carlos Plata on 16 February 2006. The 94-minute film makes emphasis on the scoring of goal 321, which gave Plata the record as top goal scorer in the history of professional Guatemalan football. It also covers his ongoing career as well as non-sport related subjects, such as family and business. The premiere took place at the Centro Cultural Miguel Ángel Asturias (national theatre), with over 2000 people in attendance. The documentary and other additional features, are included in a DVD which includes over 200 of his career goals and was released for sale to the public on the night of the film's premiere.

== Retirement from active career and number retirement ==
On 19 December 2010 Juan Carlos Plata played his last official game as a professional player in Guatemala, as a substitute in the final match for Apertura 2011, a series defining the national championship between CSD Municipal and Comunicaciones. The match ended in a draw 2–2 (being 3–3 the global score), so there was the need to define the championship on penalty series. At that time he scored a goal, however his team lost dramatically, he retired being a national Second Place.

On 9 January 2011 Juan Carlos Plata received a tribute and played a friendly match between his team CSD Municipal and an informal team composed by former and active players (all of them played at least once with Juan Carlos Plata either in CSD Municipal or Guatemala national team), named "Estrellas de Plata" (Plata's Stars). Right after the match completion, the number 15, which was used by Juan Carlos Plata during his whole career, was officially retired from CSD Municipal, being the first and only soccer player in Guatemala who is granted with this honour, thus he forms part of the Retired numbers in association football.

== Personal life ==
Plata was born to a family of five brothers and one sister in Guatemala City. Before becoming a professional footballer Plata quit school early to be a baker and help his family. Plata is married to Paty Francisco and has three children: Juan Carlos, Juan de Marco, and Ivan. Plata was born with Polydactyly, he has two thumbs on his left hand.
