= Edwin Westphal =

Guatemalan footballer (born 1966)

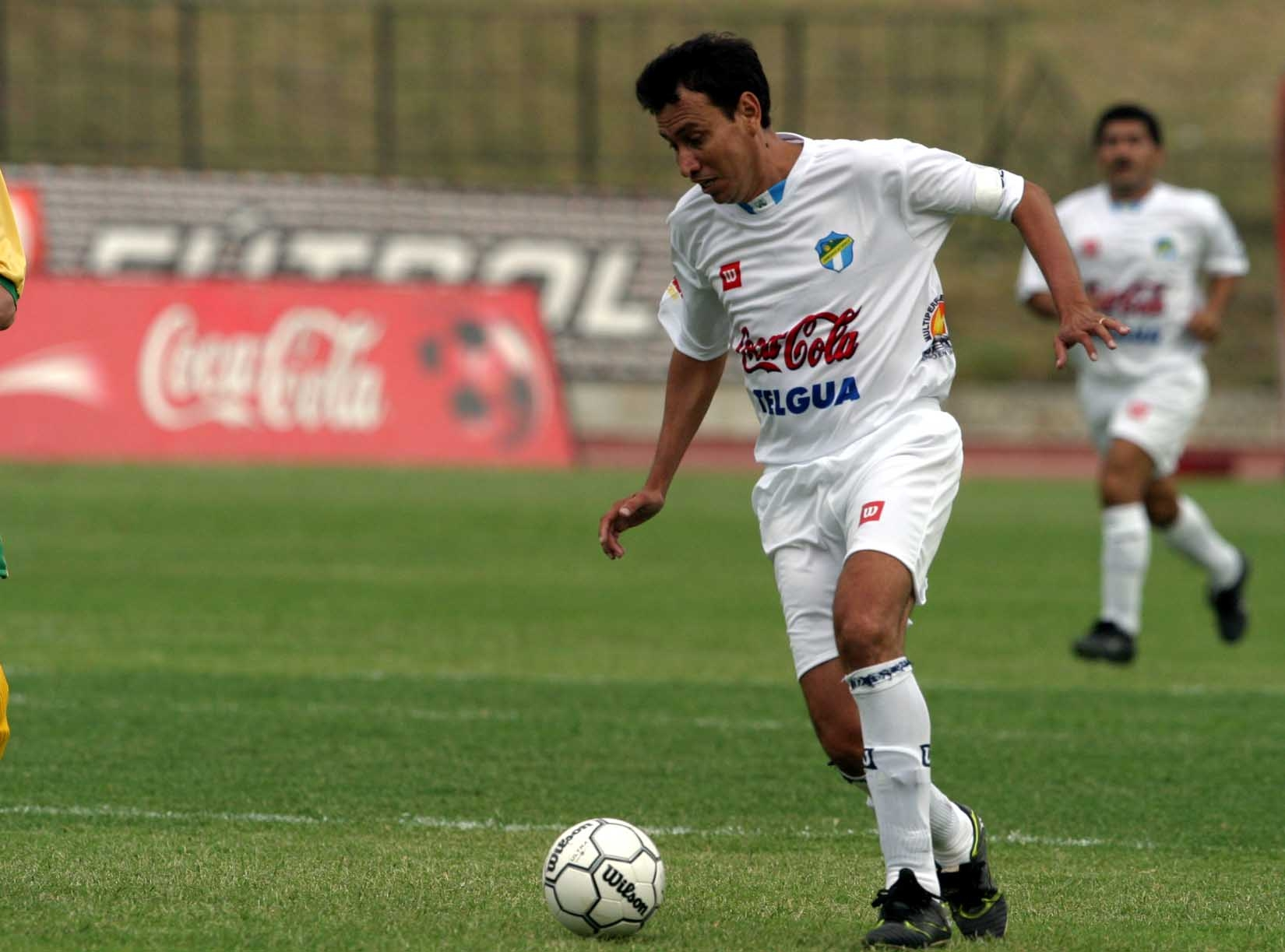
- Westphal playing for Comunicaciones in 2002

Personal information
- Full name: Edwin Rodolfo Westphal Véliz
- Date of birth: 4 March 1966 (age 60)
- Place of birth: Puerto Barrios, Guatemala
- Height: 1.90 m (6 ft 3 in)
- Position: Forward

Youth career
- Azucareros Sta Lucia Cotzumalguapa

Senior career*
Years	Team	Apps	(Gls)
1985–1990	Bandegua/Del Monte		
1990–1993	Izabal JC		(51)
1993–1996	Aurora		(48)
1996–1999	Comunicaciones		
2000–2001	USAC		(43)
2001–2002	Comunicaciones		
2002–2004	Antigua		

International career
1985–1998	Guatemala	47	(16)
- * Club domestic league appearances and goals

Edwin Rodolfo Westphal Véliz (born 4 March 1966) is a Guatemalan former professional footballer who played as a forward.

As a member of several clubs, he was a prolific goalscorer in the Guatemalan top-flight, especially during the 1990s. He was also a member of the Guatemala national team.

== Club career ==
A native of Puerto Barrios, Westphal began his career playing for local club Bandegua (Bananera de Guatemala, later renamed DelMonte), making his Liga Mayor debut in 1985 at the age of 18. While playing for Bandegua, the big striker was the top scorer of the 1987 championship. Later, he played for Izabal JC, where he won another goalscoring title. In the 1993–94 season, he played for Aurora F.C., and after that he joined Comunicaciones, where he was part of three championship-winning teams. After an unsuccessful stint with USAC, he returned to Comunicaciones, before ending his career playing for Antigua GFC. He retired from professional football in 2004 and had a farewell match in 2005. With 201 career league goals, he is the fourth-highest goalscorer in the history of the Guatemalan league.

== International career ==
Westphal was a member of the Guatemala national team for more than a decade, representing the country in three World Cup qualification processes (1990, 1994, and 1998). He also played at the Gold Cup tournaments of 1991, 1996, and 1998. Overall, he scored 16 international goals.

His final international was a February 1998 CONCACAF Gold Cup match against Jamaica.
