= 1998 CONCACAF Gold Cup =

4th edition of the CONCACAF Gold Cup

CONCACAF Championship

Tournament details
- Host country: United States
- Dates: February 1–15
- Teams: 10 (from 2 confederations)
- Venues: 3 (in 3 host cities)

Final positions
- Champions: Mexico (3rd title)
- Runners-up: United States
- Third place: Brazil
- Fourth place: Jamaica

Tournament statistics
- Matches played: 16
- Goals scored: 44 (2.75 per match)
- Attendance: 573,586 (35,849 per match)
- Top scorer(s): (Mexico) Luis Hernández (Costa Rica) Paulo Wanchope (4 goals each)
- Best player: (United States) Kasey Keller

The 1998 CONCACAF Gold Cup was the fourth edition of the Gold Cup, the soccer championship for the member associations of CONCACAF, which governs the sport in North America, Central America, and the Caribbean.

The tournament was once again held in the United States, with matches played in Los Angeles, Miami, and Oakland, California. The format of the tournament changed from 1996: it was expanded to ten teams, with four in Group A and three each in Groups B and C. The top team in each group, plus the second place in Group A would advance to the semifinals. Brazil was invited again, and brought their senior team this time. Prior to the tournament, Canada withdrew due to a lack of available players and were replaced by Jamaica.

Jamaica topped Group A over Brazil, who they tied 0–0, in a surprise result for the team. In the semi-finals, the United States beat Brazil, as Preki scored the lone goal and Kasey Keller preserved the clean sheet. The United States could not repeat that performance in front of a pro-Mexican final crowd in Los Angeles. Mexico won their third straight Gold Cup, 1–0, on a Luis Hernández goal.

== Venues ==
Los Angeles	Oakland	Miami
Los Angeles Memorial Coliseum	Oakland–Alameda County Coliseum	Orange Bowl
Capacity: 93,607	Capacity: 63,026	Capacity: 74,476
1998 CONCACAF Gold Cup is located in the United States

== Teams ==
=== Qualification ===
Team	Qualification	Appearances	Last appearance	Previous best performance	FIFA Ranking
North American zone
Mexico (TH)	Automatic	4th	1996	Champions (1993,1996)	5
United States	Automatic	4th	1996	Champions (1991)	28
Caribbean zone qualified through the 1997 Caribbean Cup
Trinidad and Tobago	Winners	3rd	1996	Group stage (1991, 1996)	56
Jamaica (Note: Canada withdrew and was replaced by Jamaica on November 26, 1997.)	Third Place	3rd	1993	Third Place (1993)	39
Cuba	Playoff	1st	None	Debut	88
Central American zone qualified through the 1997 UNCAF Nations Cup
Costa Rica	Winners	3rd	1993	Third Place (1993)	51
Guatemala	Runners-up	3rd	1996	Fourth Place (1996)	83
El Salvador	Third Place	2nd	1996	Group stage (1996)	64
Honduras	Fourth Place	4th	1996	Runners-up (1991)	73
Other
Brazil	Invitation	2nd	1996	Runners-up (1996)	1

==== Qualification play-off ====
A playoff between Cuba, the runner-up from the 1996 Caribbean Cup and Saint Kitts and Nevis, the runner-up from the 1997 Caribbean Cup, was held to determine which nation would qualify for the 1998 CONCACAF Gold Cup.

October 4, 1997

Cuba	2–0	Saint Kitts and Nevis
	Report

Trinidad and Tobago

=== Squads ===
The 10 national teams involved in the tournament were required to register a squad of 20 players; only players in these squads were eligible to take part in the tournament.

== Group stage ==
=== Group A ===
Pos	Team	Pld	W	D	L	GF	GA	GD	Pts	Qualification
1	Jamaica	3	2	1	0	5	2	+3	7	Advance to Knockout stage
2	Brazil	3	1	2	0	5	1	+4	5	Advance to Knockout stage
3	Guatemala	3	0	2	1	3	4	−1	2	
4	El Salvador	3	0	1	2	0	6	−6	1	

February 1, 1998

El Salvador	0–0	Guatemala
	Report

Los Angeles Memorial Coliseum, Los Angeles
Attendance: 26,391
Referee: Ali Bujsaim (United Arab Emirates)

February 3, 1998

Brazil	0–0	Jamaica
	Report

Orange Bowl, Miami
Attendance: 43,754
Referee: Esfandiar Baharmast (United States)

February 5, 1998

Brazil	1–1	Guatemala
Romário 79'	Report	Plata 90+2'

Orange Bowl, Miami
Attendance: 17,842
Referee: Ramesh Ramdhan (Trinidad and Tobago)

February 8, 1998

El Salvador	0–4	Brazil
	Report	Edmundo 7'; Romário 19'; Élber 87', 90'

Los Angeles Memorial Coliseum, Los Angeles
Attendance: 55,017
Referee: Rodrigo Badilla (Costa Rica)
February 8, 1998

Guatemala	2–3	Jamaica
Plata 16'; Westphal 84'	Report	Hall 14', 67'; Williams 55'

Los Angeles Memorial Coliseum, Los Angeles
Attendance: 55,017
Referee: Arturo Brizio Carter (Mexico)

February 9, 1998

Jamaica	2–0	El Salvador
Gayle 41'; Simpson 62'	Report

Los Angeles Memorial Coliseum, Los Angeles
Attendance: 5,790
Referee: Mohammed Nazri (Malaysia)

=== Group B ===
Pos	Team	Pld	W	D	L	GF	GA	GD	Pts	Qualification
1	Mexico	2	2	0	0	6	2	+4	6	Advance to Knockout stage
2	Trinidad and Tobago	2	1	0	1	5	5	0	3	
3	Honduras	2	0	0	2	1	5	−4	0	

February 1, 1998

Honduras	1–3	Trinidad and Tobago
Pavón 66'	Report	Nixon 35'; John 39', 70'

Oakland Coliseum, Oakland
Attendance: 11,234
Referee: Peter Prendergast (Jamaica)

February 4, 1998

Mexico	4–2	Trinidad and Tobago
Ramírez 37'; Hernández 63', 82'; Palencia 65'	Report	Marcelle 59'; Nixon 75'

Oakland Coliseum, Oakland
Attendance: 17,256
Referee: Mendoça (Brazil)

February 7, 1998

Mexico	2–0	Honduras
Blanco 22', 86'	Report

Oakland Coliseum, Oakland
Attendance: 36,240
Referee: Esfandiar Baharmast (United States)

=== Group C ===
Pos	Team	Pld	W	D	L	GF	GA	GD	Pts	Qualification
1	United States	2	2	0	0	5	1	+4	6	Advance to Knockout stage
2	Costa Rica	2	1	0	1	8	4	+4	3	
3	Cuba	2	0	0	2	2	10	−8	0	

February 1, 1998

United States	3–0	Cuba
Wegerle 55'; Wynalda 58'; Moore 76' (pen.)	Report

Oakland Coliseum, Oakland
Attendance: 11,234
Referee: Mourad Daami (Tunisia)

February 4, 1998

Costa Rica	7–2	Cuba
Berry 3'; Wanchope 21', 32', 64', 78'; López 29' (pen.); Myers 44'	Report	Martén 50'; Sebrango 90'

Oakland Coliseum, Oakland
Attendance: 17,256
Referee: Arturo Brizio Carter (Mexico)

February 7, 1998

United States	2–1	Costa Rica
Pope 7'; Preki 78'	Report	Oviedo 56'

Oakland Coliseum, Oakland
Attendance: 36,240
Referee: Mohammed Nazri (Malaysia)

== Knockout stage ==
=== Bracket ===
Semi-finals
February 10 – Los Angeles
United States	1
Brazil	0
February 12 – Los Angeles
Jamaica	0
Mexico (a.s.d.e.t.)	1

Final
February 15 – Los Angeles
United States	0
Mexico	1
Third place play-off
February 15 – Los Angeles
Brazil	1
Jamaica	0

=== Semi-finals ===
10 February 1998

United States	1–0	Brazil
Preki 65'	Report

Los Angeles Memorial Coliseum, Los Angeles
Attendance: 12,298
Referee: Ali Bujsaim (United Arab Emirates)

12 February 1998

Jamaica	0–1 (a.e.t./g.g.)	Mexico
	Report	Hernández 105'

Los Angeles Memorial Coliseum, Los Angeles
Attendance: 45,507
Referee: Rodrigo Badilla (Costa Rica)

=== Third place play-off ===
15 February 1998

Brazil	1–0	Jamaica
Romário 77'	Report

Los Angeles Memorial Coliseum, Los Angeles
Attendance: 91,255
Referee: Ali Bujsaim (United Arab Emirates)

=== Final ===
15 February 1998
18:00

United States	0–1	Mexico
	Report	Hernández 43'

Los Angeles Memorial Coliseum, Los Angeles
Attendance: 91,255
Referee: Ramesh Ramdhan (Trinidad and Tobago)

== Statistics ==
=== Goalscorers ===
There were 44 goals scored in 16 matches, for an average of 2.75 goals per match.

4 goals

- (Costa Rica) Paulo Wanchope
- (Mexico) Luis Hernández

3 goals

- (Brazil) Romário

2 goals

- (Brazil) Giovane Élber
- (Guatemala) Juan Carlos Plata
- (Jamaica) Paul Hall
- (Mexico) Cuauhtémoc Blanco
- (Trinidad and Tobago) Stern John
- (Trinidad and Tobago) Jerren Nixon
- (United States) Preki

1 goal

- (Brazil) Edmundo
- (Costa Rica) Austin Berry
- (Costa Rica) Wilmer López
- (Costa Rica) Roy Myers
- (Costa Rica) Allan Oviedo
- (Cuba) Luis Martén
- (Cuba) Eduardo Sebrango
- (Guatemala) Edwin Westphal
- (Honduras) Carlos Pavón
- (Jamaica) Marcus Gayle
- (Jamaica) Fitzroy Simpson
- (Jamaica) Andy Williams
- (Mexico) Ramón Ramírez
- (Mexico) Francisco Palencia
- (Trinidad and Tobago) Clint Marcelle
- (United States) Joe-Max Moore
- (United States) Eddie Pope
- (United States) Roy Wegerle
- (United States) Eric Wynalda

== Awards ==
=== Most Valuable Player ===
#	Player	Points
1st	(United States) Kasey Keller	32
2nd	(Brazil) Edmundo	30
3rd	(United States) Preki	27

=== Team of the Tournament ===
Gold Cup XI
Goalkeeper	Defenders	Midfielders	Forwards
(United States) Kasey Keller	(Mexico) Claudio Suárez (United States) Eddie Pope (Brazil) Zé Maria (Mexico) Ramón Ramírez	(United States) Preki (Jamaica) Paul Hall (Mexico) Cuauhtémoc Blanco	(Brazil) Edmundo (Costa Rica) Paulo Wanchope (Brazil) Romário
