= 2010 FIFA World Cup qualification – CONCACAF first round =

International football competition

The first round of qualifying matches for the 2010 FIFA World Cup in the CONCACAF section featured the 22 teams ranked 14 to 35 on the FIFA ranking for CONCACAF as of May 2007. The teams ranked 14th to 24th were randomly drawn against the teams ranked 25th to 35th. The draw took place on 25 November 2007 in Durban, South Africa. The top 13 CONCACAF teams received a bye and advanced directly to the second round.

== Format ==
In this round, there were 12 sub-groups played as 11 ties of two teams, plus a bye for Saint Vincent and the Grenadines. The winners and Saint Vincent and the Grenadines advanced to the second round to meet the highest ranked teams in their sub-groups, as determined by the preliminary draw. Further organisation was involved in the draw, with the 12 sub-groups drawn into three groups of four – each feeding into a separate third round group. All ties were played in home and away format, except for three: Puerto Rico–Dominican Republic, Grenada–U.S. Virgin Islands and Montserrat–Suriname were played over one leg in late March due to several Member Associations failing to meet the new FIFA Stadium standards and being unable to secure a home venue.

== Teams ==
Group 1	Group 2	Group 3
Dominica; Barbados; Turks and Caicos Islands; Saint Lucia; Bermuda; Cayman Islands; Aruba; Antigua and Barbuda	Belize; Saint Kitts and Nevis; Bahamas; British Virgin Islands; Puerto Rico; Dominican Republic; Saint Vincent and the Grenadines^{†}	Grenada; U.S. Virgin Islands; Montserrat; Suriname; El Salvador; Anguilla; Nicaragua; Netherlands Antilles

^{†} Placed in a first round sub-group, but received a bye to the second round.

== Group 1 ==
Team 1	Agg.	Team 2	1st leg	2nd leg
Dominica	1–2	Barbados	1–1	0–1
Turks and Caicos Islands	2–3	Saint Lucia	2–1	0–2
Bermuda	4–2	Cayman Islands	1–1	3–1
Aruba	0–4	Antigua and Barbuda	0–3	0–1

=== Group 1A ===
6 February 2008
19:00 UTC-4

Dominica	1–1	Barbados
Pacquette 21'	Report	Williams 43'

Windsor Park, Roseau
Attendance: 4,200
Referee: Wálter Quesada (Costa Rica)
26 March 2008
16:00 UTC-4

Barbados	1–0	Dominica
Stanford 80'	Report

Kensington Oval, Bridgetown
Attendance: 4,150
Referee: Carlos Batres (Guatemala)

Barbados won 2–1 on aggregate and advanced to play United States in the second round.

=== Group 1B ===
6 February 2008
19:45 UTC-5

Turks and Caicos Islands	2–1	Saint Lucia
Lowery 31'; G. Glinton 74'	Report	Nyhime 90+2'

National Stadium, Providenciales
Attendance: 2,200
Referee: Alfredo Whittaker (Cayman Islands)
26 March 2008
15:00 UTC-4

Saint Lucia	2–0	Turks and Caicos Islands
McPhee 28'; Elva 85'	Report

Vieux Fort National Stadium, Vieux Fort
Attendance: 1,200
Referee: Mark Forde (Barbados)

Saint Lucia won 3–2 on aggregate and advanced to play Guatemala in the second round.

=== Group 1C ===
3 February 2008
15:00 UTC-4

Bermuda	1–1	Cayman Islands
Burgess 18'	Report	Grant 87'

Bermuda National Stadium, Hamilton
Attendance: 2,000
Referee: Mauricio Navarro (Canada)
30 March 2008
20:00 UTC-5

Cayman Islands	1–3	Bermuda
M. Forbes 63' (pen.)	Report	DeGraff 18', 25'; Steede 52'

Truman Bodden Stadium, George Town
Attendance: 3,200
Referee: Jair Marrufo (United States)

Bermuda won 4–2 on aggregate and advanced to play Trinidad and Tobago in the second round.

=== Group 1D ===
6 February 2008
20:00 UTC-4

Aruba	0–3	Antigua and Barbuda
	Report	Dublin 23'; Gregory 27'; Sierra 40' (o.g.)

Trinidad Stadium, Oranjestad
Attendance: 250
Referee: Roberto Delgado (Cuba)
26 March 2008
16:15 UTC-4

Antigua and Barbuda	1–0	Aruba
Challenger 86'	Report

Antigua Recreation Ground, Saint John's
Attendance: 1,000
Referee: Courtney Campbell (Jamaica)

Antigua and Barbuda won 4–0 on aggregate and advanced to play Cuba in the second round.

== Group 2 ==
Team 1	Agg.	Team 2	1st leg	2nd leg
Belize	4–2	Saint Kitts and Nevis	3–1	1–1
Bahamas	3–3 (a)	British Virgin Islands	1–1	2–2
Dominican Republic	0–1 (Note: This tie was played as a one leg tie in Puerto Rico, as the Dominican Republic failed to meet FIFA's new stadium standards and was unable to secure a home venue.)	Puerto Rico	—	0–1 (a.e.t.)

=== Group 2A ===
6 February 2008
15:00 UTC-6

Belize	3–1	Saint Kitts and Nevis
McCauley 7', 41'; Roches 23'	Report	Williams 13'

Estadio Mateo Flores, Guatemala City (Guatemala) (Note: Belize moved their home leg to Guatemala.)
Attendance: 500
Referee: Howard Stennett (Jamaica)
26 March 2008
19:00 UTC-4

Saint Kitts and Nevis	1–1	Belize
Mitchum 84'	Report	Smith 39'

Warner Park, Basseterre
Attendance: 2,000
Referee: Neal Brizan (Trinidad and Tobago)

Belize won 4–2 on aggregate and advanced to play Mexico in the second round.

=== Group 2B ===
26 March 2008
19:00 UTC-4

Bahamas	1–1	British Virgin Islands
St. Fleur 47'	Report	Lennon 68'

Thomas Robinson Stadium, Nassau
Attendance: 450
Referee: Roberto Moreno (Panama)
30 March 2008
15:00 UTC-4

British Virgin Islands	2–2	Bahamas
Williams 78', 90' (pen.)	Report	Bethel 40'; Mitchell 52'

Thomas Robinson Stadium, Nassau (Bahamas) (Note: The British Virgin Islands elected to play their home leg in the Bahamas. The order of the legs (that is, which team was regarded as the "home team" in each match) was determined from the original draw. In the final event, this became crucial in determining the winner of the tie due to the application of the away goals rule.)
Attendance: 940
Referee: Felix Mercedes Suazo (Dominican Republic)

3–3 on aggregate. Bahamas advanced on the away goals rule to play Jamaica in the second round.

=== Group 2C ===
26 March 2008
20:00 UTC-4

Puerto Rico	1–0 (a.e.t.)	Dominican Republic
Villegas 96' (pen.)	Report

Juan Ramon Loubriel Stadium, Bayamón
Attendance: 8,000
Referee: Mauricio Morales (Mexico)

Puerto Rico advanced to play Honduras in the second round. This tie was played as a one leg tie in Puerto Rico, as the Dominican Republic failed to meet FIFA's new stadium standards and was unable to secure a home venue.

=== Group 2D ===
Saint Vincent and the Grenadines received a bye and were drawn to play Canada in the second round.

== Group 3 ==
Team 1	Agg.	Team 2	1st leg	2nd leg
U.S. Virgin Islands	0–10 (Note: This tie was played as a one leg tie in Grenada, as the U.S. Virgin Islands failed to meet FIFA's new stadium standards and was unable to secure a home venue.)	Grenada	—	0–10
Suriname	7–1 (Note: This tie was played as a one leg tie in Trinidad and Tobago, because neither side were able to provide a suitable venue according to FIFA's guidelines.)	Montserrat	—	7–1
El Salvador	16–0	Anguilla	12–0	4–0
Nicaragua	0–3	Netherlands Antilles	0–1	0–2

=== Group 3A ===
26 March 2008
15:00 UTC-4

Grenada	10–0	U.S. Virgin Islands
Roberts 3', 8'; R. Charles 9', 43', 65', 87'; Rennie 22'; Langiagne 56'; Bubb 82'; Ferguson 89' (o.g.)	Report

Grenada National Stadium, St. George's
Attendance: 3,000
Referee: Otis James (Guyana)

Grenada advanced to play Costa Rica in the second round. This tie was played as a one leg tie in Grenada, as the U.S. Virgin Islands failed to meet FIFA's new stadium standards and was unable to secure a home venue.

=== Group 3B ===
26 March 2008
18:00 UTC-4

Montserrat	1–7	Suriname
Farrell 48'	Report	Christoph 36', 56'; Wondel 44'; Valies 65'; Huur 82', 85'; Schuurman 88'

Marvin Lee Stadium, Macoya (Trinidad and Tobago)
Attendance: 100
Referee: Joel Aguilar (El Salvador)

Suriname advanced to play Guyana in the second round. This tie was played as a one leg tie in Trinidad and Tobago, because neither side were able to provide a suitable venue according to FIFA's guidelines.

=== Group 3C ===
6 February 2008
19:30 UTC-6

El Salvador	12–0	Anguilla
Martin 5', 18'; Corrales 31', 33', 54', 65', 68'; Cerritos 47', 77', 84'; Quintanilla 70'; Umaña 80'	Report

Estadio Cuscatlán, San Salvador
Attendance: 15,000
Referee: Javier Jauregui (Netherlands Antilles)
26 March 2008
20:00 UTC-4

Anguilla	0–4	El Salvador
	Report	Cerritos 7'; Corrales 15'; Monteagudo 22'; Torres 36'

RFK Stadium, Washington, D.C. (United States) (Note: Played in the United States, because Anguilla's stadium was not a suitable venue.)
Attendance: 22,670
Referee: Valman Bedeau (Grenada)

El Salvador won 16–0 on aggregate and advanced to play Panama in the second round.

=== Group 3D ===
6 February 2008
15:00 UTC-6

Nicaragua	0–1	Netherlands Antilles
	Report	Jongsma 15'

Estadio Cacique Diriangén, Diriamba
Attendance: 7,000
Referee: Walter Lopez (Guatemala)
26 March 2008
20:00 UTC-4

Netherlands Antilles	2–0	Nicaragua
Loran 42'; Zimmerman 81'	Report

Stadion Ergilio Hato, Willemstad
Attendance: 9,000
Referee: Enrico Wijngaarde (Suriname)

Netherlands Antilles won 3–0 on aggregate and advanced to play Haiti in the second round.

== Goalscorers ==
There were 68 goals scored in 19 matches, for an average of 3.58 goals per match.

6 goals

- (El Salvador) Rudis Corrales

4 goals

- (El Salvador) Ronald Cerritos
- (Grenada) Ricky Charles

2 goals

- (Belize) Deon McCauley
- (Bermuda) Devaun DeGraff
- (British Virgin Islands) Anadale Williams
- (El Salvador) Shawn Martin
- (Grenada) Jason Roberts
- (Suriname) Kenzo Huur
- (Suriname) Wensley Christoph

1 goal

- (Antigua and Barbuda) Gayson Gregory
- (Antigua and Barbuda) George Dublin
- (Antigua and Barbuda) Okeem Challenger
- (The Bahamas) Demont Mitchell
- (The Bahamas) Lesly St. Fleur
- (The Bahamas) Michael Bethel
- (Barbados) Dwayne Stanford
- (Barbados) Rashida Williams
- (Belize) Elroy Smith
- (Belize) Harrison Roches
- (Bermuda) Kwame Steede
- (Bermuda) Tyrell Burgess
- (British Virgin Islands) Rohan Lennon
- (Cayman Islands) Allean Grant
- (Cayman Islands) Marshall Forbes
- (Dominica) Richard Pacquette
- (El Salvador) Carlos Monteagudo
- (El Salvador) Eliseo Quintanilla
- (El Salvador) Emerson Umaña
- (El Salvador) William Torres
- (Grenada) Dorset Langiagne
- (Grenada) Shane Rennie
- (Grenada) Byron Bubb
- (Montserrat) Vladimir Farrell
- (Netherlands Antilles) Angelo Zimmerman
- (Netherlands Antilles) Anton Jongsma
- (Netherlands Antilles) Tyrone Loran
- (Puerto Rico) Petter Villegas
- (Saint Kitts and Nevis) Gerard Williams
- (Saint Kitts and Nevis) Orlando Mitchum
- (Saint Lucia) Gilbert Nyhime
- (Saint Lucia) Kenwin McPhee
- (Saint Lucia) Titus Elva
- (Suriname) Cleon Wondel
- (Suriname) Melvin Valies
- (Suriname) Raydell Schuurman
- (Turks and Caicos Islands) David Lowery
- (Turks and Caicos Islands) Gavin Glinton

1 own goal

- (Aruba) Dario Sierra (against Antigua and Barbuda)
- (United States Virgin Islands) Dwight Ferguson (against Grenada)
