= 2004 CONCACAF Champions' Cup =

29th edition of premier club football tournament organized by CONCACAF

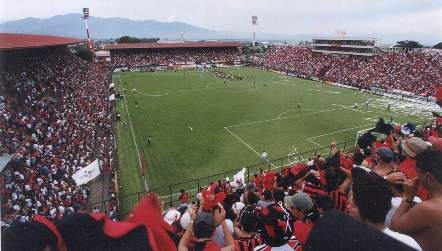
- Estadio Alejandro Morera Soto in Alajuela hosted the second leg of the final

Tournament details
- Dates: March 17 – May 12
- Teams: 8 (from 5 associations)

Final positions
- Champions: (Costa Rica) Alajuelense (2nd title)
- Runners-up: (Costa Rica) Saprissa

Tournament statistics
- Matches played: 14
- Goals scored: 38 (2.71 per match)
- Top scorer(s): (Costa Rica) Alonso Solís (Trinidad and Tobago) Cornell Glen (3 goals each)

The 2004 CONCACAF Champions' Cup was the 39th edition of the annual international club football competition held in the CONCACAF region (North America, Central America and the Caribbean), the CONCACAF Champions' Cup. It was won by Alajuelense after a 5–1 aggregate win over Deportivo Saprissa in the final.

To date, this is the last time a final has not featured a team from Mexico.

== Qualified teams ==
=== North American zone ===
- (Mexico) Pachuca - 2003 Apertura champion
- (Mexico) Monterrey - 2003 Clausura champion
- (United States) San Jose Earthquakes - 2003 MLS Cup champion
- (United States) Chicago Fire - 2003 MLS Eastern Conference/Supporters' Shield champion

=== Central American zone ===
- (Costa Rica) Saprissa - 2003 UNCAF Interclub Cup champion
- (Costa Rica) Alajuelense - 2003 UNCAF Interclub Cup third place
- (El Salvador) FAS - 2003 UNCAF Interclub Cup second best runner-up in the group stage

Notes

- (Guatemala) Comunicaciones - 2003 UNCAF Interclub Cup runner-up was disqualified from tournament because Guatemalan FA was suspended by CONCACAF and FIFA in January 2004. The place of Comunicaciones was given to C.D. FAS (as second best runner-up in the group stage).

=== Caribbean zone ===
- (Trinidad and Tobago) San Juan Jabloteh - 2003 CFU Club Championship champion

== Bracket ==
Quarterfinals
(Costa Rica)	Saprissa	2	0	3
(Mexico)	Pachuca	0	2	2
(Trinidad and Tobago)	San Juan Jabloteh	5	0	5
(United States)	Chicago Fire	2	4	6
(Costa Rica)	Alajuelense	3	0	3
(United States)	San Jose Earthquakes	0	1	1
(El Salvador)	FAS	0	1	1
(Mexico)	Monterrey	0	4	4

Semifinals
(Costa Rica)	Saprissa	2	1	3
(United States)	Chicago Fire	0	2	2
(Costa Rica)	Alajuelense	1	1	2
(Mexico)	Monterrey	1	0	1

Final
(Costa Rica)	Saprissa	1	0	1
(Costa Rica)	Alajuelense	1	4	5

== Quarterfinals ==
March 17, 2004

Saprissa (Costa Rica)	2–0	(Mexico) Pachuca
Muñoz 34'; Saborío 86'

Estadio Ricardo Saprissa
San Juan de Tibás, Costa Rica
Referee: Nery Alfaro (El Salvador)
March 24, 2004

Pachuca (Mexico)	2–0 (a.e.t.)	(Costa Rica) Saprissa
Álvez 30', 48'
Penalties
	2–3

Estadio Hidalgo
Pachuca, Mexico
Attendance: 8,000
Referee: Bogdan Stanescu (Canada)

2–2 on aggregate. Saprissa won 3–2 on penalties.

March 17, 2004

San Juan Jabloteh (Trinidad and Tobago)	5–2	(United States) Chicago Fire
Glen 8', 12', 37'; Noray 52', 74'		Elcock 40' (o.g.); Mapp 88'

Hasely Crawford Stadium
Port of Spain, Trinidad and Tobago
Attendance: 5,083
Referee: Peter Prendergast (Jamaica)
March 24, 2004

Chicago Fire (United States)	4–0	(Trinidad and Tobago) San Juan Jabloteh
Ralph 4'; Selolwane 51', 62'; Armas 90'

Soldier Field
Chicago, United States
Attendance: 6,123
Referee: Olger Mejia (Costa Rica)

Chicago Fire won 6–5 on aggregate.

March 17, 2004

Alajuelense (Costa Rica)	3–0	(United States) San Jose Earthquakes
Scott 11'; Ledezma 14'; Arnáez 62' (pen.)

Estadio Alejandro Morera Soto
Alajuela, Costa Rica
Referee: José Pineda (Honduras)
March 24, 2004

San Jose Earthquakes (United States)	1–0	(Costa Rica) Alajuelense
Mullan 89'

Spartan Stadium
San Jose, United States
Attendance: 5,130
Referee: Gilberto Alcalá (Mexico)

Alajuelense won 3–1 on aggregate.

March 17, 2004

FAS (El Salvador)	0–0	(Mexico) Monterrey

Estadio Cuscatlán
San Salvador, El Salvador
Referee: Roberto Moreno (Panama)
March 24, 2004

Monterrey (Mexico)	4–1	(El Salvador) FAS
Franco 12', 81'; Suárez 76'; Rodríguez 86'		Reyes 89'

Estadio Tecnológico
Monterrey, Mexico
Attendance: 20,000
Referee: Kevin Stott (United States)

Monterrey won 4–1 on aggregate.

== Semifinals ==
April 14, 2004

Saprissa (Costa Rica)	2–0	(United States) Chicago Fire
Núñez 50'; Solís 71'

Estadio Ricardo Saprissa
San Juan de Tibás, Costa Rica
Attendance: 4,126
Referee: Carlos Batres (Guatemala)
April 21, 2004

Chicago Fire (United States)	2–1	(Costa Rica) Saprissa
Williams 55'; Curtin 86'		Solís 11'

Soldier Field
Chicago, United States
Attendance: 7,126
Referee: Gilberto Alcalá (Mexico)

Saprissa won 3–2 on aggregate.

April 14, 2004

Alajuelense (Costa Rica)	1–0	(Mexico) Monterrey
Ruiz 3'

Estadio Alejandro Morera Soto
Alajuela, Costa Rica
Referee: Hugo Castillo (Guatemala)
April 21, 2004

Monterrey (Mexico)	1–1 (a.e.t.)	(Costa Rica) Alajuelense
Pérez 90'		Rodríguez 115'

Estadio Tecnológico
Monterrey, Mexico
Attendance: 30,000
Referee: Rodolfo Sibrian (El Salvador)

Alajuelense won 2–1 on aggregate.

== Final ==
=== First leg ===
May 5, 2004
First leg

Saprissa (Costa Rica)	1–1	(Costa Rica) Alajuelense
Solís 61'	Report	López 32'

Estadio Eladio Rosabal Cordero
Heredia, Costa Rica
Referee: Carlos Batres (Guatemala)

=== Second leg ===
May 12, 2004
Second leg

Alajuelense (Costa Rica)	4–0	(Costa Rica) Saprissa
Ledezma 7'; Alpízar 24', 40'; López 76'	Report

Estadio Alejandro Morera Soto
Alajuela, Costa Rica
Attendance: 13,000
Referee: José Pineda (Honduras)

Team details

Alajuelense
Saprissa

GK	(Costa Rica) Wardy Alfaro
DF	(Costa Rica) Luis Marín
DF	(Costa Rica) Michael Rodriguez
DF	(Costa Rica) Esteban Sirias
DF	(Costa Rica) Harold Wallace
MF	(Costa Rica) Luis Arnáez
MF	(Argentina) (Costa Rica) Pablo Gabas	(substituted off) 55'
MF	(Costa Rica) Wilmer López
MF	(Costa Rica) Steven Bryce
FW	(Costa Rica) Froylán Ledezma	(substituted off) 80'
FW	(Costa Rica) Alejandro Alpízar	(substituted off) 71'
Substitutions:
MF	(Argentina) Pablo Izaguirre	(substituted in) 55'
FW	(Costa Rica) Bryan Ruiz	(substituted in) 71'
FW	(Dominican Republic) Víctor Núñez	(substituted in) 80'
Manager:
(Costa Rica) Javier Delgado

GK	(Costa Rica) José Porras
DF	(Costa Rica) Reynaldo Parks
DF	(Costa Rica) Douglas Sequeira
DF	(Costa Rica) Jervis Drummond
DF	(Costa Rica) Try Bennett
MF	(Costa Rica) Wilson Muñoz
MF	(Costa Rica) José L. López
MF	(Costa Rica) Juan B, Esquivel
MF	(Costa Rica) Alonso Solís	(substituted off) 59'
FW	(Costa Rica) Gerald Drummond	(substituted off) 72'
FW	(Costa Rica) Álvaro Saborío	(substituted off) 65'
Substitutions:
MF	(Costa Rica) José F. Alfaro	(substituted in) 59'
FW	(Costa Rica) Erick Corrales	(substituted in) 65'
FW	(Costa Rica) Kenneth Vargas	(substituted in) 72'
Manager:
(Costa Rica) Hernán Medford

Alajuelense won 5–1 on aggregate.

== Champions ==
CONCACAF Champions' Cup
2004 Winners

Alajuelense
Second Title

== Top scorers ==
Rank	Player	Club	Goals
1	(Costa Rica) Alonso Solís	(Costa Rica) Saprissa	3
1	(Trinidad and Tobago) Cornell Glen	(Trinidad and Tobago) Jabloteh	3
3	(Uruguay) Gabriel Álvez	(Mexico) Pachuca	2
3	(Botswana) Dipsy Selolwane	(United States) Chicago Fire	2
3	(Trinidad and Tobago) Kerry Noray	(Trinidad and Tobago) Jabloteh	2
3	(Mexico) Guillermo Franco	(Mexico) Monterrey	2
3	(Costa Rica) Froylán Ledezma	(Costa Rica) Alajuelense	2
3	(Costa Rica) Wílmer López	(Costa Rica) Alajuelense	2
3	(Costa Rica) Alejandro Alpízar	(Costa Rica) Alajuelense	2
