= 2010 FIFA World Cup qualification – CONCACAF third round =

Football tournament qualification stage

The third round of qualifying matches for the 2010 FIFA World Cup from the CONCACAF section featured the 12 winners from the second round. The draw took place on 25 November 2007 in Durban, South Africa.

== Format ==
In this round, the winners from the second round were placed into three groups of four teams, determined by the draw. Here, they played a double round robin home and away schedule. The top two teams from each group advanced to the fourth round.

== Group 1 ==
Pos	Team	Pld	W	D	L	GF	GA	GD	Pts	(United States)	(Trinidad and Tobago)	(Guatemala)	(Cuba)
1	United States	6	5	0	1	14	3	+11	15	—	3–0	2–0	6–1
2	Trinidad and Tobago	6	3	2	1	9	6	+3	11	2–1	—	1–1	3–0
3	Guatemala	6	1	2	3	6	7	−1	5	0–1	0–0	—	4–1
4	Cuba	6	1	0	5	5	18	−13	3	0–1	1–3	2–1	—

20 August 2008
20:00 UTC-4

Cuba	1–3	Trinidad and Tobago
Márquez 85'	Report	Daniel 27', 61'; Glen 66'

Estadio Pedro Marrero, Havana
Attendance: 4,000
Referee: Benito Archundia (Mexico)
20 August 2008
20:10 UTC-6

Guatemala	0–1	United States
	Report	Bocanegra 69'

Estadio Nacional Mateo Flores, Guatemala City
Attendance: 26,000
Referee: Enrico Wijngaarde (Suriname)

6 September 2008
17:30 UTC-4

Trinidad and Tobago	1–1	Guatemala
Daniel 84'	Report	Gallardo 90'

Hasely Crawford Stadium, Port of Spain
Attendance: 9,500
Referee: Roberto Moreno (Panama)
6 September 2008
20:10 UTC-4

Cuba	0–1	United States
	Report	Dempsey 40'

Estadio Pedro Marrero, Havana
Attendance: 12,000
Referee: Joel Aguilar (El Salvador)

10 September 2008
19:10 UTC-5

United States	3–0	Trinidad and Tobago
Bradley 9'; Dempsey 18'; Ching 57'	Report

Toyota Park, Bridgeview
Attendance: 11,452
Referee: Courtney Campbell (Jamaica)
10 September 2008
20:00 UTC-6

Guatemala	4–1	Cuba
Ruiz 38', 55'; Rodríguez 85'; Contreras 90+1'	Report	Linares 25'

Estadio Nacional Mateo Flores, Guatemala City
Attendance: 19,750
Referee: Marco Antonio Rodríguez (México)

11 October 2008
19:10 UTC-4

United States	6–1	Cuba
Beasley 10', 30'; Donovan 48'; Ching 63'; Altidore 87'; Onyewu 89'	Report	Muñoz 31'

Robert F. Kennedy Memorial Stadium, Washington
Attendance: 20,249
Referee: Roberto Moreno (Panama)
11 October 2008
20:00 UTC-6

Guatemala	0–0	Trinidad and Tobago
	Report

Estadio Nacional Mateo Flores, Guatemala City
Attendance: 29,000
Referee: Silviu Petrescu (Canada)

15 October 2008
20:00 UTC-4

Cuba	2–1	Guatemala
Colomé 45' (pen.); Urgelles 90'	Report	Pappa 80'

Estadio Pedro Marrero, Havana
Attendance: 6,000
Referee: Courtney Campbell (Jamaica)
15 October 2008
20:10 UTC-4

Trinidad and Tobago	2–1	United States
Latapy 61'; Yorke 79' (pen.)	Report	Davies 75'

Hasely Crawford Stadium, Port of Spain
Attendance: 19,000
Referee: Wálter Quesada (Costa Rica)

19 November 2008
21:10 UTC-4

Trinidad and Tobago	3–0	Cuba
Jones 67'; Yorke 69'; Daniel 89'	Report

Hasely Crawford Stadium, Port of Spain
Attendance: 18,000
Referee: Enrico Wijngaarde (Suriname)
19 November 2008
18:10 UTC-7

United States	2–0	Guatemala
Cooper 54'; Adu 69'	Report

Dick's Sporting Goods Park, Commerce City
Attendance: 9,303
Referee: Benito Archundia (Mexico)

== Group 2 ==
Pos	Team	Pld	W	D	L	GF	GA	GD	Pts	(Honduras)	(Mexico)	(Jamaica)	(Canada)
1	Honduras	6	4	0	2	9	5	+4	12	—	1–0	2–0	3–1
2	Mexico	6	3	1	2	9	6	+3	10	2–1	—	3–0	2–1
3	Jamaica	6	3	1	2	6	6	0	10	1–0	1–0	—	3–0
4	Canada	6	0	2	4	6	13	−7	2	1–2	2–2	1–1	—

20 August 2008
19:30 UTC-4

Canada	1–1	Jamaica
De Guzman 47'	Report	Williams 52'

BMO Field, Toronto
Attendance: 22,000
Referee: Carlos Batres (Guatemala)
20 August 2008
20:00 UTC-5

Mexico	2–1	Honduras
Pardo 73', 75'	Report	De León 36'

Estadio Azteca, Mexico City
Attendance: 81,100
Referee: Joel Aguilar (El Salvador)

6 September 2008
17:00 UTC-5
(Note: The two matches between Jamaica and Mexico had their playing dates reversed due to the Hurricane Gustav.)

Mexico	3–0	Jamaica
Guardado 3'; Arce 33'; Magallón 63'	Report

Estadio Azteca, Mexico City
Attendance: 96,000
Referee: Baldomero Toledo (USA)
6 September 2008
20:00 UTC-4

Canada	1–2	Honduras
Serioux 4'	Report	R. Núñez 47', 56'

Saputo Stadium, Montreal
Attendance: 13,032
Referee: Wálter Quesada (Costa Rica)

10 September 2008
20:00 UTC-5

Mexico	2–1	Canada
Bravo 59'; Márquez 73'	Report	Gerba 78'

Estadio Víctor Manuel Reyna, Tuxtla Gutiérrez
Attendance: 26,900
Referee: Neal Brizan (Trinidad and Tobago)
10 September 2008
19:30 UTC-6

Honduras	2–0	Jamaica
R. Núñez 65'; Guevara 73' (pen.)	Report

Estadio Olímpico Metropolitano, San Pedro Sula
Attendance: 39,000
Referee: Roberto Moreno (Panama)

11 October 2008
19:00 UTC-5

Jamaica	1–0	Mexico
Fuller 34'	Report

Independence Park, Kingston
Attendance: 27,000
Referee: Wálter Quesada (Costa Rica)
11 October 2008
19:30 UTC-6

Honduras	3–1	Canada
W. Martínez 9'; Costly 65'; Thomas 90'	Report	Hainault 54'

Estadio Olímpico Metropolitano, San Pedro Sula
Attendance: 36,000
Referee: Jair Marrufo (USA)

15 October 2008
19:00 UTC-5

Jamaica	1–0	Honduras
Shelton 16'	Report

Independence Park, Kingston
Attendance: 25,000
Referee: Neal Brizan (Trinidad and Tobago)
15 October 2008
19:00 UTC-6

Canada	2–2	Mexico
Gerba 13'; Radzinski 50'	Report	Salcido 35'; Vuoso 64'

Commonwealth Stadium, Edmonton
Attendance: 14,145
Referee: Enrico Wijngaarde (Suriname)

19 November 2008
19:00 UTC-6

Honduras	1–0	Mexico
Osorio 52' (o.g.)	Report

Estadio Olímpico Metropolitano, San Pedro Sula
Attendance: 45,000
Referee: Carlos Batres (Guatemala)
19 November 2008
20:00 UTC-5

Jamaica	3–0	Canada
Shelton 28'; King 58' (pen.); Cummings 85'	Report

Independence Park, Kingston
Attendance: 28,000
Referee: Joel Aguilar (El Salvador)

== Group 3 ==
Pos	Team	Pld	W	D	L	GF	GA	GD	Pts	(Costa Rica)	(El Salvador)	(Haiti)	(Suriname)
1	Costa Rica	6	6	0	0	20	3	+17	18	—	1–0	2–0	7–0
2	El Salvador	6	3	1	2	11	4	+7	10	1–3	—	5–0	3–0
3	Haiti	6	0	3	3	4	13	−9	3	1–3	0–0	—	2–2
4	Suriname	6	0	2	4	4	19	−15	2	1–4	0–2	1–1	—

20 August 2008
17:00 UTC-5

Haiti	2–2	Suriname
Bertin 90'; Fucien 90+5'	Report	Christoph 31', 46'

Stade Sylvio Cator, Port-au-Prince
Attendance: 7,800
Referee: Mauricio Navarro (Canada)
20 August 2008
20:00 UTC-6

Costa Rica	1–0	El Salvador
Saborío 49' (pen.)	Report

Estadio Ricardo Saprissa, San José
Attendance: 27,000
Referee: Marco Antonio Rodríguez (México)

6 September 2008
19:30 UTC-6

El Salvador	5–0	Haiti
Zelaya 7', 24', 53'; Larios 58'; Torres 79'	Report

Estadio Cuscatlán, San Salvador
Attendance: 21,000
Referee: Jair Marrufo (USA)
6 September 2008
20:00 UTC-6

Costa Rica	7–0	Suriname
Ledezma 9', 41'; Alpízar 47'; Alonso 78'; Borges 79'; Solís 86'; Ruiz 88'	Report

Estadio Ricardo Saprissa, San José
Attendance: 11,000
Referee: Steven Depiero (Canada)

10 September 2008
16:30 UTC-3

Suriname	0–2	El Salvador
	Report	Martin 2'; Felter 12' (o.g.)

André Kamperveen Stadion, Paramaribo
Attendance: 4,500
Referee: Benito Archundia (Mexico)
10 September 2008
17:00 UTC-5

Haiti	1–3	Costa Rica
Alcénat 40'	Report	Ruiz 12', 75'; Alpízar 86'

Stade Sylvio Cator, Port-au-Prince
Attendance: 14,700
Referee: Carlos Batres (Guatemala)

11 October 2008
16:30 UTC-3

Suriname	1–4	Costa Rica
Sandvliet 48'	Report	Centeno 10'; Borges 41'; Alonso 47'; Solís 78'

André Kamperveen Stadion, Paramaribo
Attendance: 3,000
Referee: Courtney Campbell (Jamaica)
11 October 2008
17:00 UTC-5

Haiti	0–0	El Salvador
	Report

Stade Sylvio Cator, Port-au-Prince
Attendance: 10,000
Referee: Neal Brizan (Trinidad and Tobago)

15 October 2008
20:00 UTC-6

Costa Rica	2–0	Haiti
Díaz 16'; Núñez 90+2'	Report

Estadio Ricardo Saprissa, San José
Attendance: 5,500
Referee: Ricardo Salazar (USA)
15 October 2008
20:00 UTC-6

El Salvador	3–0	Suriname
Zelaya 8'; Quintanilla 27'; Garden 81' (o.g.)	Report

Estadio Cuscatlán, San Salvador
Attendance: 20,000
Referee: Carlos Batres (Guatemala)

19 November 2008
16:30 UTC-3

Suriname	1–1	Haiti
Christoph 40'	Report	Saint-Preux 28'

André Kamperveen Stadion, Paramaribo
Attendance: 800
Referee: Marco Antonio Rodríguez (México)
19 November 2008
19:30 UTC-6

El Salvador	1–3	Costa Rica
Corrales 18'	Report	Myrie 24', 90+4'; Fernández 30'

Estadio Cuscatlán, San Salvador
Attendance: 20,000
Referee: Silviu Petrescu (Canada)

== Goalscorers ==
There were 103 goals scored in 36 matches, for an average of 2.86 goals per match.

4 goals

- (El Salvador) Rodolfo Zelaya
- (Trinidad and Tobago) Keon Daniel

3 goals

- (Costa Rica) Bryan Ruiz
- (Honduras) Ramón Núñez
- (Suriname) Wensley Christoph

2 goals

- (Canada) Ali Gerba
- (Costa Rica) Armando Alonso
- (Costa Rica) Alejandro Alpízar
- (Costa Rica) Celso Borges
- (Costa Rica) Froylan Ledezma
- (Costa Rica) Roy Myrie
- (Costa Rica) Alonso Solís
- (Guatemala) Carlos Ruíz
- (Jamaica) Luton Shelton
- (Mexico) Pável Pardo
- (Trinidad and Tobago) Dwight Yorke
- (United States) DaMarcus Beasley
- (United States) Brian Ching
- (United States) Clint Dempsey

1 goal

- (Canada) Julian de Guzman
- (Canada) Andrew Hainault
- (Canada) Tomasz Radzinski
- (Canada) Adrian Serioux
- (Costa Rica) Walter Centeno
- (Costa Rica) Júnior Díaz
- (Costa Rica) Freddy Fernández
- (Costa Rica) Victor Núñez
- (Costa Rica) Álvaro Saborío
- (Cuba) Jaime Colomé
- (Cuba) Roberto Linares
- (Cuba) Yénier Márquez
- (Cuba) Jensy Muñoz
- (Cuba) Allianni Urgelles
- (El Salvador) Rudis Corrales
- (El Salvador) César Larios
- (El Salvador) Shawn Martin
- (El Salvador) Eliseo Quintanilla
- (El Salvador) William Torres
- (Guatemala) José Manuel Contreras
- (Guatemala) Carlos Gallardo
- (Guatemala) Marco Pappa
- (Guatemala) Mario Rodríguez
- (Haiti) Jean Alcénat
- (Haiti) Frantz Bertin
- (Haiti) Brunel Fucien
- (Haiti) Leonel Saint-Preux
- (Honduras) Carlo Costly
- (Honduras) Amado Guevara
- (Honduras) Julio César de León
- (Honduras) Walter Martínez
- (Honduras) Hendry Thomas
- (Jamaica) Omar Cummings
- (Jamaica) Ricardo Fuller
- (Jamaica) Marlon King
- (Jamaica) Andy Williams
- (Mexico) Fernando Arce
- (Mexico) Omar Bravo
- (Mexico) Andrés Guardado
- (Mexico) Jonny Magallon
- (Mexico) Rafael Márquez
- (Mexico) Carlos Salcido
- (Mexico) Matías Vuoso
- (Suriname) Clifton Sandvliet
- (Trinidad and Tobago) Cornell Glen
- (Trinidad and Tobago) Kenwyne Jones
- (Trinidad and Tobago) Russell Latapy
- (United States) Freddy Adu
- (United States) Jozy Altidore
- (United States) Carlos Bocanegra
- (United States) Michael Bradley
- (United States) Kenny Cooper
- (United States) Landon Donovan
- (United States) Charlie Davies
- (United States) Oguchi Onyewu

1 own goal

- (Mexico) Ricardo Osorio (against Honduras)
- (Suriname) Marlon Felter (against El Salvador)
- (Suriname) Derrik Garden (against El Salvador)
