= 2010 FIFA World Cup qualification – CONCACAF second round =

International football competition

The second round of qualifying matches for the 2010 FIFA World Cup from the CONCACAF section featured the 13 top-ranked CONCACAF teams in the FIFA World Rankings as of May 2007, along with the 11 winning teams from the first round. The draw took place on 25 November 2007 in Durban, South Africa.

== Format ==
In this round 12 of the remaining 24 teams would be eliminated. There were 12 ties and the winners advanced to the next round. All games were scheduled to be played in home and away format. Further organisation was involved in the draw, with the 12 ties grouped into three groups of four – each feeding into a separate third round group. Within each group of four ties, one tie included a team ranked 1–3, one included a team ranked 4–6 and two included teams ranked 7–12. The 13th ranked side (who received a bye in the first round), were ensured a tie against a team ranked 7–12. All other ties were against first round winners.

== Group 1 ==
Team 1	Agg.	Team 2	1st leg	2nd leg
United States	9–0	Barbados	8–0	1–0
Guatemala	9–1	Saint Lucia	6–0	3–1
Trinidad and Tobago	3–2	Bermuda	1–2	2–0
Antigua and Barbuda	3–8	Cuba	3–4	0–4

=== Group 1A ===
15 June 2008
14:00 UTC−7

United States	8–0	Barbados
Dempsey 1', 63'; Bradley 12'; Ching 20', 89'; Donovan 59'; Johnson 82'; Ferguson 86' (o.g.)	Report

The Home Depot Center, Carson
Attendance: 11,476
Referee: Marco Antonio Rodríguez (México)
22 June 2008
15:00 UTC−4

Barbados	0–1	United States
	Report	Lewis 21'

Kensington Oval, Bridgetown
Attendance: 2,000
Referee: Roberto Moreno (Panama)

United States won 9–0 on aggregate and advanced to the third round.

=== Group 1B ===
14 June 2008
20:00 UTC−6

Guatemala	6–0	Saint Lucia
Rodríguez 6'; Ruiz 36', 40', 58', 90+3'; Trigueros 90+1'	Report

Estadio Mateo Flores, Guatemala City
Attendance: 24,600
Referee: Benito Archundia (Mexico)
21 June 2008
19:00 UTC−7

Saint Lucia	1–3	Guatemala
McPhee 45'	Report	Romero 24', 43'; Trigueros 86'

Los Angeles Memorial Coliseum, Los Angeles (United States) (Note: Saint Lucia elected to play their home leg in the United States.)
Attendance: 12,000
Referee: Enrico Wijngaarde (Suriname)

Guatemala won 9–1 on aggregate and advanced to the third round.

=== Group 1C ===
15 June 2008
17:30 UTC−4

Trinidad and Tobago	1–2	Bermuda
John 22'	Report	Nusum 8', 40'

Marvin Lee Stadium, Macoya
Attendance: 4,585
Referee: Wálter Quesada (Costa Rica)
22 June 2008
19:30 UTC−3

Bermuda	0–2	Trinidad and Tobago
	Report	Roberts 9'; John 66'

Bermuda National Stadium, Hamilton
Attendance: 5,000
Referee: Carlos Batres (Guatemala)

Trinidad and Tobago won 3–2 on aggregate and advanced to the third round.

=== Group 1D ===
17 June 2008
19:00 UTC−4

Antigua and Barbuda	3–4	Cuba
Skepple 9', 13'; Simon 81'	Report	Colomé 10', 74'; Garfield Gonsalves 22' (o.g.); Duarte 85'

Sir Vivian Richards Stadium, St. John's
Attendance: 4,500
Referee: Roberto Moreno (Panama)
22 June 2008
17:00 UTC−4

Cuba	4–0	Antigua and Barbuda
Linares 10', 45+2', 53'; Márquez 69'	Report

Estadio Pedro Marrero, Havana
Attendance: 2,000
Referee: Wálter Quesada (Costa Rica)

Cuba won 8–3 on aggregate and advanced to the third round.

== Group 2 ==
Team 1	Agg.	Team 2	1st leg	2nd leg
Belize	0–9	Mexico	0–2	0–7
Jamaica	13–0	Bahamas	7–0	6–0
Honduras	6–2	Puerto Rico	4–0	2–2
Saint Vincent and the Grenadines	1–7 (Note: Order of legs reversed from originally published draw.)	Canada	0–3	1–4

=== Group 2A ===
15 June 2008
15:30 UTC−5

Belize	0–2	Mexico
	Report	Vela 66'; Borgetti 90+2' (pen.)

Reliant Stadium, Houston (United States) (Note: Belize elected to play their home leg in the United States.)
Attendance: 50,137
Referee: Javier Santillán (Netherlands Antilles)
21 June 2008
21:00 UTC−5

Mexico	7–0	Belize
Vela 7'; Guardado 33'; Arce 45+1', 48'; Borgetti 62', 90+4'; Lennen 90+2' (o.g.)	Report

Estadio Universitario, Monterrey
Attendance: 42,000
Referee: Silviu Petrescu (Canada)

Mexico won 9–0 on aggregate and advanced to the third round.

=== Group 2B ===
15 June 2008
18:00 UTC−5

Jamaica	7–0	Bahamas
Gardner 17'; Phillips 23'; King 34'; Shelton 51', 66'; Goodison 75'; Daley 89'	Report

Independence Park, Kingston
Attendance: 20,000
Referee: Mauricio Navarro (Canada)
18 June 2008
16:00 UTC−5

Bahamas	0–6	Jamaica
	Report	Burton 29', 56'; Shelton 35', 38' (pen.), 43'; Marshall 40'

Greenfield Stadium, Daniel Town (Jamaica) (Note: The Bahamas elected to play their home leg in Jamaica.)
Attendance: 10,500
Referee: Benito Archundia (México)

Jamaica won 13–0 on aggregate and advanced to the third round.

=== Group 2C ===
4 June 2008
20:30 UTC−6

Honduras	4–0	Puerto Rico
de León 25'; Palacios 51'; Suazo 52', 90+2'	Report

Estadio Olímpico Metropolitano, San Pedro Sula
Attendance: 20,000
Referee: Courtney Campbell (Jamaica)
14 June 2008
20:00 UTC−4

Puerto Rico	2–2	Honduras
Megaloudis 32'; Villegas 41'	Report	Suazo 23'; Palacios 52'

Estadio Juan Ramón Loubriel, Bayamón
Attendance: 5,000
Referee: Walter Lopez Castellanos (Guatemala)

Honduras won 6–2 on aggregate and advanced to the third round.

=== Group 2D ===
15 June 2008
15:00 UTC−4

Saint Vincent and the Grenadines	0–3	Canada
	Report	Nakajima-Farran 32'; Gerba 43', 88'

Arnos Vale Stadium, Kingstown
Attendance: 5,000
Referee: Carlos Batres (Guatemala)
20 June 2008
19:30 UTC−4

Canada	4–1	Saint Vincent and the Grenadines
De Rosario 29', 50'; Gerba 38', 63'	Report	James 76'

Saputo Stadium, Montreal
Attendance: 11,502
Referee: Joel Aguilar (El Salvador)

Canada won 7–1 on aggregate and advanced to the third round.

== Group 3 ==
Team 1	Agg.	Team 2	1st leg	2nd leg
Grenada	2–5	Costa Rica	2–2	0–3
Suriname	3–1	Guyana	1–0	2–1
Panama	2–3	El Salvador	1–0	1–3
Haiti	1–0	Netherlands Antilles	0–0	1–0

=== Group 3A ===
14 June 2008
16:00 UTC−4

Grenada	2–2	Costa Rica
P. Modeste 20'; Roberts 27'	Report	Alonso 42'; V. Núñez 75'

Grenada National Stadium, St. George's
Attendance: 10,000
Referee: Neal Brizan (Trinidad and Tobago)
21 June 2008
20:00 UTC−6

Costa Rica	3–0	Grenada
Saborío 17'; Ruiz 30'; Azofeifa 89'	Report

Estadio Ricardo Saprissa Aymá, San José
Attendance: 16,000
Referee: Jair Marrufo (United States)

Costa Rica won 5–2 on aggregate and advanced to the third round.

=== Group 3B ===
14 June 2008
16:00 UTC−3

Suriname	1–0	Guyana
Sandvliet 52'	Report

André Kamperveen Stadion, Paramaribo
Attendance: 3,000
Referee: Jose Guerrero (Nicaragua)
22 June 2008
15:30 UTC−4

Guyana	1–2	Suriname
Codrington 84'	Report	van Dijk 11'; Sandvliet 36'

Providence Stadium, Georgetown
Attendance: 12,000
Referee: Courtney Campbell (Jamaica)

Suriname won 3–1 on aggregate and advanced to the third round.

=== Group 3C ===
15 June 2008
16:00 UTC−4

Panama	1–0	El Salvador
Tejada 21'	Report

Estadio Nacional de Panamá, Panama City
Attendance: 22,150
Referee: Enrico Wijngaarde (Suriname)
22 June 2008
18:00 UTC−6

El Salvador	3–1	Panama
Quintanilla 70', 83' (pen.); Anaya 87'	Report	Garcés 14'

Estadio Cuscatlán, San Salvador
Attendance: 27,420
Referee: Marco Antonio Rodríguez (México)

El Salvador won 3–2 on aggregate and advanced to the third round.

=== Group 3D ===
15 June 2008
15:00 UTC−4

Haiti	0–0	Netherlands Antilles
	Report

Stade Sylvio Cator, Port-au-Prince
Attendance: 6,000
Referee: Joel Aguilar (El Salvador)
22 June 2008
18:00 UTC−4

Netherlands Antilles	0–1	Haiti
	Report	Martha 77' (o.g.)

Stadion Ergilio Hato, Willemstad
Attendance: 9,000
Referee: Neal Brizan (Trinidad and Tobago)

Haiti won 1–0 on aggregate and advanced to the third round.

== Goalscorers ==
There were 90 goals scored in 24 matches, for an average of 3.75 goals per match.

5 goals

- (Jamaica) Luton Shelton

4 goals

- (Canada) Ali Gerba
- (Guatemala) Carlos Ruíz

3 goals

- (Cuba) Roberto Linares
- (Honduras) David Suazo
- (Mexico) Jared Borgetti

2 goals

- (Antigua and Barbuda) Kerry Skepple
- (Bermuda) John Barry Nusum
- (Canada) Dwayne De Rosario
- (Cuba) Jaine Valencia
- (El Salvador) Eliseo Quintanilla
- (Guatemala) Gonzalo Romero
- (Guatemala) Abner Trigueros
- (Honduras) Wilson Palacios
- (Jamaica) Deon Burton
- (Mexico) Carlos Vela
- (Mexico) Fernando Arce
- (Suriname) Clifton Sandvliet
- (Trinidad and Tobago) Stern John
- (United States) Brian Ching
- (United States) Clint Dempsey

1 goal

- (Antigua and Barbuda) Tyio Simon
- (Canada) Issey Nakajima-Farran
- (Costa Rica) Álvaro Saborío
- (Costa Rica) Armando Alonso
- (Costa Rica) Bryan Ruiz
- (Costa Rica) Randall Azofeifa
- (Costa Rica) Victor Núñez
- (Cuba) Jaime Colomé
- (Cuba) Leonel Duarte
- (Cuba) Jeniel Márquez
- (El Salvador) Luis Anaya
- (Grenada) Jason Roberts
- (Grenada) Patrick Modeste
- (Guatemala) Mario Rafael Rodríguez
- (Guyana) Nigel Codrington
- (Honduras) Julio César de León
- (Jamaica) Demar Phillips
- (Jamaica) Ian Goodison
- (Jamaica) Marlon King
- (Jamaica) Omar Daley
- (Jamaica) Ricardo Gardner
- (Jamaica) Tyrone Marshall
- (Mexico) Andrés Guardado
- (Panama) Luis Tejada
- (Panama) José Luis Garcés
- (Puerto Rico) Chris Megaloudis
- (Puerto Rico) Petter Villegas
- (Saint Lucia) Kenwin McPhee
- (Saint Vincent and the Grenadines) Marlon James
- (Suriname) Germaine van Dijk
- (Trinidad and Tobago) Darryl Roberts
- (United States) Eddie Johnson
- (United States) Eddie Lewis
- (United States) Landon Donovan
- (United States) Michael Bradley

1 own goal

- (Barbados) Daryl Ferguson (against United States)
- (Belize) Tervor Lennen (against Mexico)
- (Netherlands Antilles) Eugene Martha (against Haiti)
