= Aztecazo =

Mexico versus Costa Rica football match 16 June 2001

El Aztecazo
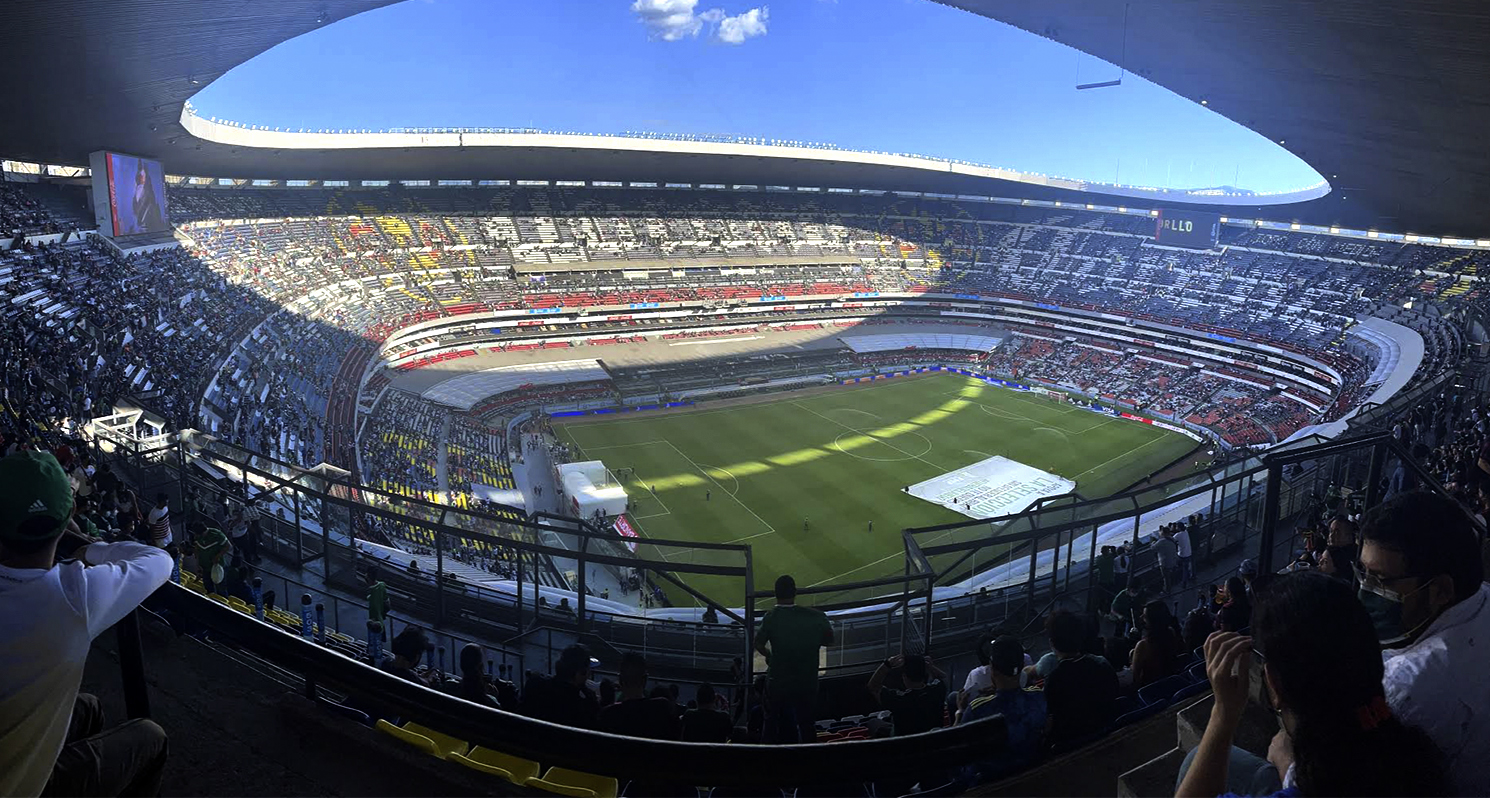
- The Estadio Azteca hosted the match.
- Event: 2002 FIFA World Cup qualification match
| Mexico | Costa Rica |
| 1 | 2 |
- Date: 16 June 2001
- Venue: Estadio Azteca, Mexico City, Mexico
- Man of the Match: Rolando Fonseca
- Referee: Carlos Batres (Guatemala)
- Attendance: 60,000

On 16 June 2001, Mexico played Costa Rica in a football match at the Estadio Azteca in Mexico City, Mexico on the fourth matchday of the final round in the qualification process for the 2002 FIFA World Cup.

Mexico and Costa Rica reached the matchday with four points, both losing as visitors against the United States. Arnoldo Rivera in La Nación described the match as "crucial" as lackluster results by both teams raised doubts prior to the match. The match ended in an unprecedented loss by Mexico. The Mexicans led 1–0 at half-time, with a header by José Manuel Abundis. Costa Rica then made a comeback in the second half, with goals by Rolando Fonseca and Hernán Medford, ending the match 1–2.

The game marked the first loss suffered by Mexico in the Azteca Stadium in a FIFA World Cup qualification match. It was subsequently referred to as the Aztecazo, a name created by Costa Rican journal La Nación. Costa Rica went on to qualify to the 2002 FIFA World Cup in first place with a record 23 points. Mexico suffered a second consecutive loss in a visit against Honduras, which prompted the resignation of coach Enrique Meza.

== Background ==
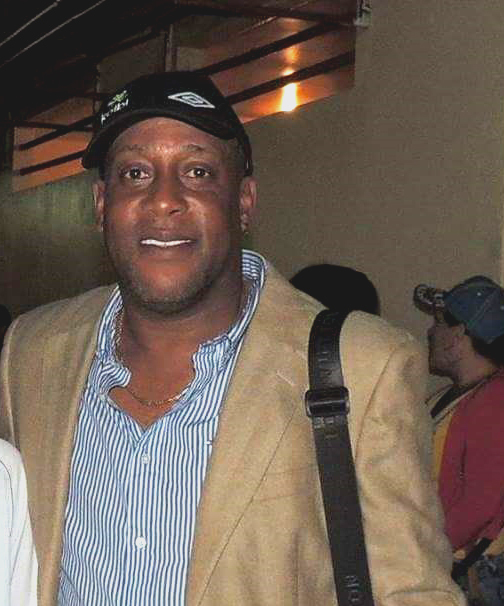
Costa Rican forward Hernán Medford caused controversy days before the match

Prior to the match Mexico had never lost a FIFA World Cup qualification match at their home Estadio Azteca. The only losses suffered by the Mexican team at the stadium were friendlies against Hungary, Brazil, Italy, Peru, Chile and Spain, between 1967 and 1981.

The previous encounter between Mexico and Costa Rica at the Estadio Azteca was a 1998 FIFA World Cup qualifier on November 9, 1997. The match saw the Ticos making a comeback to end the match with a 3–3 draw, cited by La Nación's José Eduardo Mora as "historic... and useless" as the draw proved to be insufficient for Costa Rica to qualify for the 1998 FIFA World Cup.

Prior to the match, both teams accumulated four points in the three previous matchdays of the final round. The United States, led in points because it defeated both Mexico and Costa Rica on U.S. soil. Costa Rica drew with Honduras in San José and defeated Trinidad and Tobago in Alajuela, while the Mexicans drew with the Trinidadians in Port of Spain, and defeated Jamaica at the Azteca Stadium. Doubts arose in both teams, as Costa Rica lost the 2001 UNCAF Nations Cup to Guatemala, while Mexico suffered a 4–0 defeat against England and a poor performance at the 2001 FIFA Confederations Cup.

Days before the match, Costa Rican player Hernán Medford questioned Mexico's status as the top team (or "giants") of the CONCACAF region by claiming that "Mexico are neither the giants of CONCACAF nor the invincible team of the region." In response, Rafael Márquez declared that "we speak on the pitch and not out of it, and we will see if Medford is right." Joaquín del Olmo also responded to Medford's declarations, saying that "[Medford] likes to get into controversy and to be honest it is annoying by the declarations of somebody who has eaten of us, of our country. On Saturday, on the pitch, we will talk." Medford replied with "I do not want to get into controversy. But, what do they want? To me to speak soft things? If they do not like it, they should dedicate to something else. We will see each other on the pitch."

== The match ==
=== First half ===
Mexico scored early in the match. In the seventh minute, Víctor Ruiz took a corner kick and sent a cross for José Manuel Abundis to overcome Gilberto Martínez and score a header past Erick Lonnis. Abundis celebrated by lifting his jersey, showing a T-shirt that read "Profe Meza, estamos con usted" (Professor Meza, we are with you) in support of his coach, Enrique Meza.

During the first half, Costa Rica lacked coordination on its defensive line, and did not show any communication with Lonnis. Paulo Wanchope had a chance blocked by Oswaldo Sánchez. La Nación's Arnoldo Rivera criticized the team for their offensive shortcomings, such as leaving Wanchope alone, which Rivera deemed "an orphanhood" that hindered the team during crucial opportunities. Rolando Fonseca was subbed on for Rodrigo Cordero in the fortieth minute.

=== Second half ===
Mexico substituted Cesáreo Victorino in the fifty-second minute. He caused difficulty for the Costa Rican side, but he was eventually covered by defenders Luis Marín and Gilberto Martínez.

During the second half, Costa Rican midfielder Wilmer López reemerged and was described as "the spark plug" of the team. Coach Alexandre Guimarães subbed on William Sunsing for Carlos Castro in the fifty-ninth minute. Sunsing's speed forced Mexican defender Duilio Davino to foul him close to the box. The free kick allowed Rolando Fonseca to score with his right foot in the seventy-second minute, drawing the match.

Hernán Medford was subbed on for Paulo Wanchope in the eightieth minute. Fonseca shot with his right foot from long distance, taking Oswaldo Sánchez by surprise. Sánchez managed to deflect the shot, only for Medford to score the second goal for the Ticos. Guatemalan referee Carlos Batres admitted on 16 March 2017 that Medford was offside when Fonseca made the shot and therefore his goal should not have been allowed. During the final minutes, Erick Lonnis made a crucial save to ensure the victory for the Costa Rican side.

=== Details ===
16 June 2001
12:00 (UTC-5)

| Mexico | 1–2 | Costa Rica |
|---|---|---|
| Abundis 7' | Report 1 Report 2 | Fonseca 72'; Medford 86' |

Estadio Azteca, Mexico City
Attendance: 60,000
Referee: Carlos Batres (Guatemala)

| Mexico | Costa Rica |

| GK | 24 | Oswaldo Sánchez |
| DF | 2 | Claudio Suárez |
| DF | 13 | Pável Pardo | (yellow card) 26' |
| DF | 5 | Duilio Davino | (yellow card) 61' |
| DF | 18 | Salvador Carmona | (yellow card) 64' |
| MF | 6 | Marco Antonio Ruiz | | (substituted off) 67' |
| MF | 20 | Víctor Ruiz |
| MF | 14 | Joaquín del Olmo | | (substituted off) 75' |
| LW | 19 | Miguel Zepeda | | (substituted off) 52' |
| FW | 9 | José Manuel Abundis |
| FW | 15 | Luis Hernández |
Substitutes:
| GK | 1 | Jorge Campos |
| DF | 3 | Sergio Almaguer |
| MF | 8 | Gerardo Torrado |
| FW | 11 | Daniel Osorno | | (substituted on) 67' |
| FW | 17 | Francisco Palencia | | (substituted on) 75' |
| MF | 21 | Cesáreo Victorino | | (substituted on) 52' |
| FW | 23 | Jared Borgetti |
Manager:
Enrique Meza

| GK | 1 | Erick Lonnis |
| DF | 2 | Jervis Drummond |
| DF | 3 | Luis Marín | (yellow card) 62' |
| DF | 21 | Reynaldo Parks |
| DF | 22 | Carlos Castro | (yellow card) 28' | (substituted off) 59' |
| DF | 5 | Gilberto Martínez |
| MF | 6 | Wílmer López |
| MF | 8 | Mauricio Solís | (yellow card) 55' |
| MF | 19 | Rodrigo Cordero | | (substituted off) 40' |
| FW | 16 | Steven Bryce |
| FW | 9 | Paulo Wanchope | (yellow card) 64' | (substituted off) 80' |
Substitutes:
| FW | 7 | Rolando Fonseca | | (substituted on) 40' |
| MF | 10 | Walter Centeno |
| DF | 14 | Austin Berry |
| DF | 15 | Harold Wallace |
| FW | 17 | Hernán Medford | | (substituted on) 80' |
| GK | 18 | Lester Morgan |
| FW | 20 | William Sunsing | | (substituted on) 59' |
Manager:
Alexandre Guimarães

== Reactions ==
=== Professional ===
After the match, the press of Mexico, Costa Rica and the United States rushed into what La Nación described as "a fierce battle" to interview Hernán Medford, who was subject of controversy prior to the match and eventually scored the winning goal. A smiling Medford described the win as "a historic result" and thanked coach Alexandre Guimarães by remembering his pass that helped Medford score against Sweden at the 1990 FIFA World Cup. "Eleven years ago I scored a goal thanks to a pass by Guima, today I returned the favor to make him the manager who broke such an important record that is beating Mexico in their Azteca."

Coach Guimarães said "this is the most important triumph of my career as a manager, player and even as a mejenguero [amateur player]." He then praised his team, commenting that "we achieved something that few national teams have done. This group deserved it because of the conviction, the desires and the quality. Each one of the boys want to do something big."

Costa Rican Wílmer López called for calm, commenting that the team needed to control their emotions in order to qualify to the 2002 FIFA World Cup. "Aside from the historical that is the result, we should be careful and know that there is too much left to walk. I am happy, of course, but not in excess," López said. Goalscorer Rolando Fonseca said that "the only giant is God. Mexico is no longer the big fish," replicating the controversial claim made by Hernán Medford before the match. Forward Paulo Wanchope celebrated the victory by saying "to all the Costa Ricans that believe in us: enjoy, because we made history today and we are in a good way."

Jervis Drummond expressed that the triumph meant an enormous boost to qualify for the World Cup, "we knew of the importance that surrounded this match and we never went down arms. We knew how to respond to the early goal and we brought out the courage." Erick Lonnis described his crucial save in the last minute of the match, "I saw that the ball was falling and I chose to put my hand. My location allowed me to deflect it, thus keeping the result," Lonnis said.

On the Mexican side, coach Enrique Meza commented "I recognize their victory, they were better than us and also their speed was very important." He also commented on the negative streak of the team by saying "There is a serious problem because we have not been able to win, but I am proud of this group of players." He ended by defending his lead of the team by declaring "I always fought to be here, today I put all my effort and my knowledge of the game, it may have not been enough, but I am not going."

Forward Luis Hernández commented on the difficulty to get the Mexican fans to trust in the team again. "I think the trust in Mexico has been totally lost and it is hard to go on this way."

=== Media ===
La Nación cover on June 17, 2001. It depicts the headline "¡Aztecazo!", which would go on to name the match

Costa Rican media celebrated the triumph. On June 17, newspaper La Nación published on both their website and printed issue the headline "¡Aztecazo!", depicting both Medford and Fonseca celebrating the second goal. The headline would go on to name the match. Diario Extra mocked the Mexicans with the headline "¡Quiúbole, manitos!" (What's up, dudes?).

Mexican journal Reforma noted the historical importance of the triumph for Costa Rica, and commented "as the Azteca turned into a funeral for most of the spectators and even the press, on one of the stands of the venue the Costa Rican party unleashed with more than ten thousand followers of the Central American team, who started to wave their flags and sing in gratitude to their national team." El Universal commented that "Costa Rica buried Mexico" and that "Ticos —and Medford— showed that Mexico is no longer the giant of CONCACAF."

EFE noted that when the match ended, the Costa Rican president Miguel Ángel Rodríguez, who was in the stadium, went down the steps to congratulate the team. The agency also commented that "the rest of the fans, Mexicans, kept silent shocked to see their team losing and began to yell "Meza out!" and "Return the tickets!"."

The Aztecazo is regarded as one of the worst defeats in the history of the Mexico national football team. On July 25, 2013, ESPN Deportes' Alberto Hernández cited the Aztecazo as one of the ten most painful defeats in the history of the Mexican team, while Univision's Dan Fridman named it as "one of the biggest humiliations in the history of El Tri." Milenio's Jorge García included the Aztecazo on his list of "black days in Mexican sports history."

== Aftermath ==
Costa Rica went on to finish as leaders of the final round with a record 23 points, thus qualifying to the 2002 FIFA World Cup. Four days after the Aztecazo, Mexico was defeated in an away game against Honduras by 3–1. This new loss, which was the sixth in a row for the Mexicans, caused Enrique Meza to resign from his charge as manager. He would be replaced by Javier Aguirre, with whom the Mexicans would qualify to the World Cup as the second placed team after defeating Honduras 3–0 at the Azteca stadium.

At the 2002 World Cup, Costa Rica would be allocated in Group C. The Ticos debuted by defeating China, drew with eventual third-place Turkey and lost against eventual champions Brazil. Despite finishing with four points, Costa Rica were eliminated in the group stage, as their goal difference was insufficient against that of the Turkish team. Mexico would be allocated in Group G, along with Croatia, Ecuador and Italy. As a result of victories against the Croatians and Ecuadorians, and a draw against the Italians, Mexico topped the group. The Mexicans were then eliminated in the round of sixteen by fellow North American rival the United States.

After the Aztecazo, Costa Rica spent twelve years without a single win against Mexico. The negative streak included four games at the Azteca Stadium: two 2–0 defeats in 2005 and 2009, a 1–0 defeat in 2012 and a 0–0 draw in 2013. Costa Rica would eventually end the streak by defeating the Mexicans 2–1 at the Costa Rica National Stadium on October 15, 2013, in a result that would’ve resulted in Mexico failing to qualify for the 2014 FIFA World Cup if Panama defeated the United States (the USA scored two goals in the dying minutes to turn a 2-1 deflict into a 3-2 victory which eliminated Panama instead of Mexico). This is Costa Rica's only victory in all competitions against Mexico since the Aztecazo. Since Medford's goal in the Aztecazo, Costa Rica has failed to score again at the Estadio Azteca.

Mexico would lose two more friendlies in the Azteca stadium, against Paraguay in June 2007 and the United States in August 2012.

=== Honduran Aztecazo ===
On September 6, 2013, Mexico would suffer their second loss at the stadium during a FIFA World Cup qualification match, this time losing against Honduras. Coincidentally, the match started with Mexico scoring in the early minutes but ultimately suffering a comeback by the Central American team. Mexican newspaper Récord also pointed out the coincidence of a goalkeeper making a mistake that resulted in the rival team scoring, as José de Jesús Corona's failure allowed Honduran player Jerry Bengtson to score, comparing it to Oswaldo Sánchez's mistaken save that resulted in Hernán Medford scoring for Costa Rica. The Honduran triumph would be known as Haztecazo, a portmanteau of Aztecazo and the silent pronunciation of the H in Honduras.

6 September 2013
20:30 (UTC-5)

| Mexico | 1–2 | Honduras |
|---|---|---|
| Peralta 6' | Report | Bengtson 63'; Costly 66' |

Estadio Azteca, Mexico City
Attendance: 73,981
Referee: Roberto Moreno (Panama)

| Mexico | Honduras |

== See also ==
- 2002 FIFA World Cup qualification
- Costa Rica–Mexico football rivalry
