= 2003 UNCAF Interclub Cup =

Tournament details
- Dates: 8 October–21 December 2003
- Teams: 13 (from 7 associations)

Final positions
- Champions: (Costa Rica) Saprissa (5th title)
- Runners-up: (Guatemala) Comunicaciones

Tournament statistics
- Matches played: 24
- Goals scored: 72 (3 per match)

The 2003 UNCAF Interclub Cup was the 21st edition of the international club football competition held in the UNCAF region representing the seven nations of Central America. Costa Rican side Deportivo Saprissa obtained their fifth regional title after defeating Comunicaciones F.C. in the final match. Both clubs, along with third placed Liga Deportiva Alajuelense, qualified to the 2004 CONCACAF Champions' Cup.

== Qualifying round ==
8 October 2003 1st leg	Boca (Belize)	0–5	(Costa Rica) Alajuelense	Independence and Mango Creek, Belize
(UTC−06:00)			Alpízar 22'; Montero 56'; Porras 62' 66'; Jiménez 90+4'	Stadium: Michael Ashcroft Stadium

22 October 2003 2nd leg	Alajuelense (Costa Rica)	10–0	(Belize) Boca	Alajuela, Costa Rica
(UTC−06:00)	Hernández 10' 19'; Granados 14' 64'; Ruiz 25' 53'; Izaguirre 34'; Núñez 45' 79' 82'			Stadium: Estadio Alejandro Morera Soto

- Alajuelense won 15–0 on aggregate score.

== First round ==
=== Group 1 ===
Diriamba, Estelí, and Managua, Nicaragua

Pos	Team	Pld	W	D	L	GF	GA	GD	Pts	Qualification
1	(Costa Rica) Saprissa	3	3	0	0	8	1	+7	9	Qualification for Final Round
2	(El Salvador) FAS	3	2	0	1	5	4	+1	6	
3	(Nicaragua) Real Estelí	3	0	1	2	2	4	−2	1	
4	(Nicaragua) Diriangén	3	0	1	2	2	8	−6	1	

Real Estelí (Nicaragua)	0-1	(Costa Rica) Deportivo Saprissa

Diriangén FC (Nicaragua)	1–2	(El Salvador) FAS	Nicaragua
Luis Martínez		William Reyes	Stadium: Estadio Cacique Diriangén

Diriangén FC (Nicaragua)	1–1	(Nicaragua) Real Estelí	Managua, Nicaragua
Emilio Palacio		Felix Zeledón	Stadium: Dennis Martínez National Stadium

Deportivo Saprissa (Costa Rica)	2-1	(El Salvador) FAS

' Deportivo Saprissa (Costa Rica)	5–0	(Nicaragua) Diriangén FC	Cacique Diriangén Stadium
Kénneth Vargas		Nil

FAS (El Salvador)	2-1	(Nicaragua) Real Estelí

=== Group 2 ===
All matches were at the Estadio Cementos Progreso, Guatemala City, Guatemala

Pos	Team	Pld	W	D	L	GF	GA	GD	Pts	Qualification
1	(Guatemala) Municipal	3	2	1	0	9	4	+5	7	Qualification for Final Round
2	(Guatemala) Comunicaciones	3	2	0	1	8	2	+6	6	Qualification for Final Round
3	(El Salvador) San Salvador	3	0	2	1	3	6	−3	2	
4	(Panama) Deportivo Árabe Unido	3	0	1	2	2	10	−8	1	

Comunicaciones (Guatemala)	4–0	(Panama) CD Árabe Unido

Municipal (Guatemala)	2-2	(El Salvador) San Salvador F.C.

Municipal (Guatemala)	2-1	(Guatemala) Comunicaciones

San Salvador F.C. (El Salvador)	1–1	(Panama) CD Árabe Unido

Municipal (Guatemala)	5-1	(Panama) CD Árabe Unido

Comunicaciones (Guatemala)	3-0	(El Salvador) San Salvador F.C.

=== Group 3 ===
All matches were at the Estadio Francisco Morazán, San Pedro Sula, Honduras

Pos	Team	Pld	W	D	L	GF	GA	GD	Pts	Qualification
1	(Costa Rica) Alajuelense	3	2	1	0	3	1	+2	7	Qualification for Final Round
2	(Honduras) Marathón	3	1	2	0	5	0	+5	5	
3	(Panama) San Francisco	3	1	0	2	1	6	−5	3	
4	(Honduras) Olimpia	3	0	1	2	1	3	−2	1	

5 November 2003 1st leg	Olimpia (Honduras)	1–2	(Costa Rica) Alajuelense
(UTC−06:00)	Cárcamo 50'		Fonseca 4' 11'

5 November 2003 1st leg	Marathón (Honduras)	5–0	(Panama) San Francisco
(UTC−08:00)	Pacini 31'; Costa 32' 60' 76'; Martínez 40' (pen.)

7 November 2003	San Francisco (Panama)	0-1	(Costa Rica) Alajuelense

7 November 2003	Marathón (Honduras)	0–0	(Honduras) Olimpia

9 November 2003	Olimpia (Honduras)	0-1	(Panama) San Francisco

9 November 2003	Marathón (Honduras)	0–0	(Costa Rica) Alajuelense

== Final round ==
Los Angeles, USA

=== Semifinals ===
Team #1	Score	Team #2
Alajuelense (Costa Rica)	0–1	(Costa Rica) Deportivo Saprissa
Municipal (Guatemala)	0(2-4)0	(Guatemala) Comunicaciones

Alajuelense (Costa Rica)	0-1	(Costa Rica) Deportivo Saprissa	Los Angeles
			Stadium: LA Memorial Coliseum

Municipal (Guatemala)	0 (2-4) 0	(Guatemala) Comunicaciones	Los Angeles
			Stadium: LA Memorial Coliseum

=== Third place ===
21 December 2003
14:00

Alajuelense (Costa Rica)	2–0	(Guatemala) Municipal
Jiménez 1'; Núñez 11'

Los Angeles Memorial Coliseum
Los Angeles
Referee: Kevin Stott (USA)

=== Final ===
21 December 2003
16:00

Comunicaciones (Guatemala)	2–3	(Costa Rica) Saprissa
Pezzarossi 8'; Morales 48'		Santana 26'; Saborío 78' (pen.) 88'

Los Angeles Memorial Coliseum
Los Angeles
Referee: Ricardo Valenzuela (USA)
- Deportivo Saprissa 2003 UNCAF champions.
- Deportivo Saprissa, Comunicaciones F.C., Liga Deportiva Alajuelense advance to 2004 CONCACAF Champions' Cup quarterfinals.
- As Guatemala were suspended by CONCACAF and FIFA in January 2004, the place of Comunicaciones F.C. was given to C.D. FAS (as second best runners-up in the group stage).
