= Pablo Chinchilla =

Costa Rican footballer (born 1978)

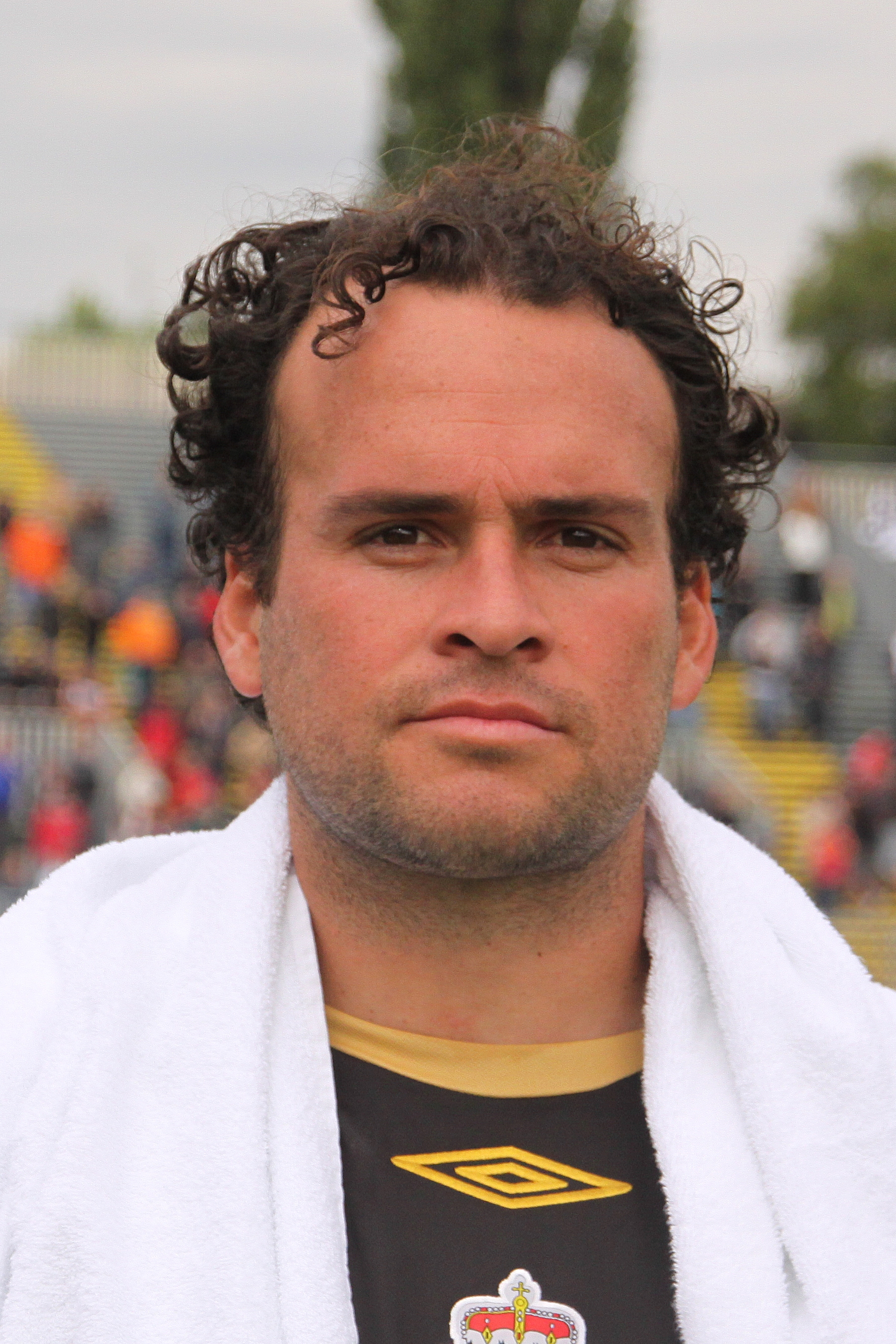

Personal information
- Full name: Pablo Chinchilla Vega
- Date of birth: December 21, 1978 (age 47)
- Place of birth: Escazú, Costa Rica
- Height: 1.86 m (6 ft 1 in)
- Position: Defender

Team information
- Current team: FC Koblach (player-manager)

Youth career
- Alajuelense
- 1997–1998: → Rheindorf Altach (loan)

Senior career*
Years	Team	Apps	(Gls)
1999–2004	Alajuelense	179	(8)
2005	Los Angeles Galaxy	19	(1)
2005–2006	Alajuelense	8	(0)
2006–2008	Rheindorf Altach	64	(2)
2008	Liberia Mía	10	(1)
2009–2011	LASK Linz	53	(3)
2011–2013	SV Lochau		
2013–present	FC Koblach		

International career^{‡}
1999–2008	Costa Rica	39	(1)
- * Club domestic league appearances and goals as of 9 May 2010 ‡ National team caps and goals as of 7 April 2009

Pablo Chinchilla Vega (born December 21, 1978, in Escazú) is a Costa Rican footballer who currently is the player-manager of Austrian lower league side FC Koblach.

== Career ==
=== Club ===
Chinchilla began his career in the youth system of Primera División de Costa Rica team Alajuelense. He was loaned to Austrian side Altach for a season before summoned back by Liga and he eventually graduated to their senior side making his professional debut for them on 15 August 1999 against Carmelita. He then scored his first goal on 12 September 1999 against San Carlos. After five years with the Rojinegros, during which time he won the 2004 CONCACAF Champions' Cup, he joined Los Angeles Galaxy of Major League Soccer prior to the 2005 season. His stay in the USA was largely unsuccessful and he returned to Alajuelense after just one season.

In summer 2006 Chinchilla rejoined Austrian club SC Rheindorf Altach, and spent two years playing with them in the Austrian Football Bundesliga. After a brief spell back home in Costa Rica at Liberia Mía Chinchilla returned to Austria by signing with LASK Linz in January 2009. He went amateur when he joined lower league side Lochau.

In summer 2013, Chinchilla left Lochau and moved to Austrian Landesklasse side Koblach to become player manager and extended his contract with a year in March 2014.

=== International ===
At junior level, Chinchilla played at the 1995 FIFA U-17 World Championship and the 1997 FIFA World Youth Championship.

He made his debut for Costa Rica in a November 1999 friendly match against Slovakia and earned a total of 39 caps, scoring 1 goal. He was a late addition to their 2002 World Cup squad, replacing the injured Reynaldo Parks and represented his country at the 2003 UNCAF Nations Cup as well as at the 2000 and 2003 CONCACAF Gold Cups. He was a non-playing squad member at the 2007 CONCACAF Gold Cup.

His final international was a February 2008 friendly game against Jamaica.

=== International goals ===
Scores and results list Costa Rica's goal tally first.

N.	Date	Venue	Opponent	Score	Result	Competition
1.	20 November 2002	Estadio Olímpico Atahualpa, Quito, Ecuador	Ecuador	1–0	2–2	Friendly match

== Honours ==
Alajuelense

- CONCACAF Champions' Cup: 2004

Los Angeles Galaxy

- Major League Soccer MLS Cup: 2005
