= Costa Rica–Mexico football rivalry =

International football rivalry

- Teams: Costa Rica; Mexico
- First meeting: April 2, 1935; Central American and Caribbean Games; Mexico 2–0 Costa Rica
- Latest meeting: June 22, 2025; CONCACAF Gold Cup; Mexico 0–0 Costa Rica

Statistics
- Total meetings: 57
- All-time series: Mexico, 32–19–6
- Largest victory: Mexico: 7–2, Aug 17, 1975; Costa Rica: 2–0 Nov 30, 1969

The Costa Rica-Mexico football rivalry is the match played between the two national teams. It is one of the most frequent football matches in the Confederation of North, Central American and Caribbean Association Football (CONCACAF) qualifiers for the FIFA World Cup and the CONCACAF Gold Cup.

The two teams have played fifty-seven official matches recognized by FIFA, and are the second most frequent opponents for the Mexican national team and the fourth for the Costa Rican national team. In their fifty matches, Mexico leads with thirty-two wins, Costa Rica has six wins, and they have drawn nineteen times.

They maintain a historic rivalry stemming from multiple factors, one of which is the North American country's sporting supremacy in Central America. During their first matches, both countries exercised hegemony in CONCACAF, having won three CONCACAF Nations Championships. They even played in the previous Clásico de Concacaf (Concacaf Classic) since both teams had a very balanced level.

== History ==
=== 1930-1950: Beginnings ===
The first official match between the two countries was played during the 1935 Central American and Caribbean Games, held in San Salvador on April 2, 1935. The result was a 2-0 victory in favor of Mexico with goals by Luis "Pochitos" Pérez and Tomás "Tiva" Campos. Two years later, at the IV Central American and Caribbean Games in Panama City, a 2-1 result was again achieved for the Mexicans with two goals by Mexican Horacio Casarín and one by Costa Rican Alejandro Morera.

=== 1960s: Costa Rican domain ===
During the 1960s, Costa Rica dominated Mexico, achieving a series of positive results. In the first CONCACAF Championship, held in 1965, Costa Rica eliminated Mexico from the first phase of the tournament and, at the conclusion, became the first champion in the tournament's history. Costa Rica's other victories over Mexico came in a 1962 World Cup qualifier (1-0 in San José) and another in the 1969 CONCACAF Championship (2-0), a title Costa Rica won that year. Despite this, Costa Rica failed to qualify for any FIFA World Cup, while Mexico earned spots in the 1962 and 1966 FIFA World Cups in Chile and England, with victories over the ticos.

=== 1970s: Mexico's path to victory ===
In the 1970s, the winning streak remained in Mexico's favor, winning two CONCACAF Championships (1971 and 1977) and becoming the host nation of the 1970 FIFA World Cup. Costa Rica, meanwhile, experienced a period of crisis in the continental championship and in the qualifiers, failing to achieve the success of the previous decade in the CONCACAF Championship or participating in a FIFA World Cup. The footballing balance between the two countries in this decade was evidenced by Mexico's resounding 7-0 victory in a friendly match held on August 17, 1975.

=== 1980s: Another decade of contrasts ===
In the 1980s, Costa Rica returned to success after winning the 1989 CONCACAF championship and qualifying for the first time in its history for a FIFA World Cup, for the 1990 edition of Italy. Mexico again experienced a period of ups and downs, having only competed in the 1986 edition as host country, while having failed in its attempt to compete in the 1982 and 1990 World Cups in Spain. During this decade, both countries played only two friendlies, both of which were won by the Mexicans.

=== 1990s: First match in the Copa América ===
On June 19, 1997, Costa Rica and Mexico competed in the Copa America held in Bolivia, where they shared the same group, marking the first match of the rivalry to be held in South America. The match ended in a 1-1 draw with goals from Luis "Matador" Hernández (penalty in the 14th minute) and Hernán Medford (60th minute). On November 11 of the same year, one of the most emotional matches of the rivalry was played, a 1998 World Cup qualification that ended in a 3-3 draw at the Estadio Azteca, in which Costa Rica salvaged a draw after trailing 3-1.

=== 2000s: the Aztecazo ===
On June 18, 2001, Costa Rica and Mexico faced each other in a qualifying match for the 2002 FIFA World Cup. The match had been crucial for both teams, as they arrived with four points, although Mexico was the clear favorite due to being the host country. The first half ended 1-0 in favor of Mexico, thanks to a header from José Manuel Abundis. However, Costa Rica managed to shock the world with a comeback that ended 2-1 after goals from Rolando Fonseca (72nd minute) and Hernán Medford (80th minute). The referee ended the match, marking the first defeat in Mexico's history in an official match played at the Estadio Azteca; the newspaper La Nación considered this a historic victory in Costa Rican football, dubbing the match the Aztecazo.

=== 2010s: New dominance by Mexico ===
The 2010s in this rivalry began with Mexico's crushing 4-1 victory over Costa Rica in the 2011 CONCACAF Gold Cup, featuring a strong performance from midfielder Andrés Guardado. A year later, the Mexicans claimed two wins in the CONCACAF Hexagonal pre-qualification quadrangular tournament: the first on September 7, 2012, at the Estadio Nacional in San José, with a score of 2-0, and the second on September 11 at the Estadio Azteca, with a score of 1-0. In 2015, the two faced each other in another memorable CONCACAF Gold Cup match, specifically in the quarterfinals. Just like four years ago, Andrés Guardado would be the Costa Ricans' executioner, scoring the goal that would give Mexico a place in the tournament's semifinals.

=== 2020s-present ===
In 2021, Mexico and Costa Rica faced off in the semifinals of the inaugural CONCACAF Nations League tournament. After 120 goalless minutes, the match went to a penalty shootout, where Mexico won 5-4.

== Summary ==
Competition	Played	CR. won	Draw	MX. won
FIFA World Cup qualification	24	4	8	12
CONCACAF Gold Cup	14	1	6	7
CONCACAF Nations League	1	0	1	0
Copa América	1	0	1	0
Panamerican Championship	3	0	2	1
Central American and Caribbean Games	2	0	0	2
Total	45	5	18	22
Exhibition games	12	1	1	10
Total	57	6	19	32

== Notable managers ==
Only three coaches have managed both teams.

1.- Bora Milutinović (Mexico 1983–1986 and 1995–1997, Costa Rica 1990):

Milutinović was the first coach to manage both teams. He was the manager of Mexico at the 1986 FIFA World Cup, the country's second hosting tournament, where the team topped the group stage with two wins and a draw, defeating Bulgaria 2-0 in the round of 16 before being eliminated by West Germany in the quarter-finals on penalties. His second spell with Mexico was highlighted by winning the 1996 CONCACAF Gold Cup (defeating Brazil in the final) and a strong performance at the 1997 Copa América, finishing third (defeating Peru). Milutinović was also the manager who led Costa Rica to its first World Cup in 1990, where the Costa Ricans defeated Scotland and Sweden in the group stage before being eliminated by Czechoslovakia 4-1.

He is also the only coach to have led both teams in FIFA World Cups.

2.- Ricardo Lavolpe (Mexico 2002–2006, Costa Rica 2011):

Following the departure of Javier Aguirre, he was appointed as the new head coach of Mexico. In 2003, Lavolpe led the team to win the CONCACAF Gold Cup by defeating Brazil (who were contesting the tournament as guests) with a score of 1-0. He subsequently also managed the Mexican national team at the 2005 FIFA Confederations Cup and the 2006 FIFA World Cup, in addition to officiating at the 2004 Olympic Games in Greece. After five years of coaching in club football, he was named the new head coach of Costa Rica, where he led the team to both the Copa América and the CONCACAF Gold Cup in 2011; however, the Costa Rican team's performance in these competitions was poor.

Lavolpe's playing philosophy (named Lavolpismo) has earned him praise from fans and critics alike, with The Guardian even naming him "Best Coach of the World Cup" for his attitude.

3.- Miguel Herrera (Mexico 2013–2015, Costa Rica 2025–2026):

In October 2013, Herrera was appointed coach of Mexico, largely due to his success as manager of Club América, which he led to a dramatic Liga MX title. He qualified the team for the 2014 FIFA World Cup after crushing 5-1 and 4-2 victories over New Zealand in the inter-confederation playoffs. When many considered Mexico eliminated in the first round of the World Cup, Herrera and his team shocked the world by reaching the knockout stage, only to be eliminated. The following year, he managed both the Copa América and the CONCACAF Gold Cup; in the former, Mexico was eliminated in the first round, although in the latter, they won by defeating Jamaica 3-1 in the final. In January 2025, Herrera was appointed as Costa Rica's new coach, and will look to guide them to the 2026 FIFA World Cup, but was dismissed in November from his role following Costa Rica's failure to qualify for the World Cup.
