= Armando Alonso =

Costa Rican footballer (born 1984)

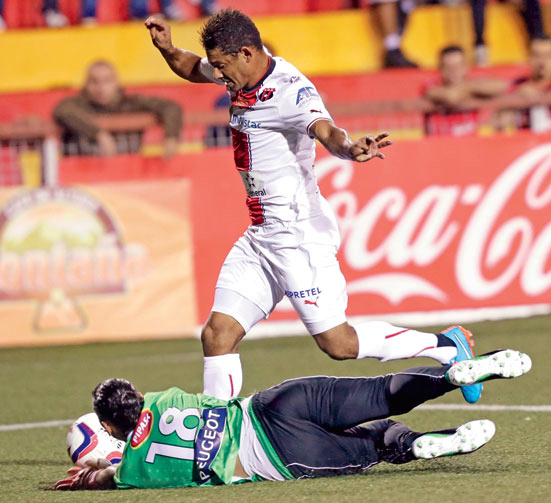
- Alonso playing for Alajuelense

Personal information
- Full name: Armando Alonso Rodríguez
- Date of birth: 21 March 1984 (age 42)
- Place of birth: San José, Costa Rica
- Height: 1.78 m (5 ft 10 in)
- Positions: Striker; winger; attacking midfielder

Team information
- Current team: Alajuelense
- Number: 8

Youth career
- Saprissa

Senior career*
Years	Team	Apps	(Gls)
2001–2011	Deportivo Saprissa	112	(24)
2005–2007	→ Cartaginés (loan)	46	(6)
2012–	Alajuelense	112	(28)

International career^{‡}
2008–	Costa Rica	23	(3)
- * Club domestic league appearances and goals as of 1 July 2015 ‡ National team caps and goals as of 1 January 2014

Armando Alonso Rodríguez (born 21 March 1984) is a Costa Rican professional footballer who used to play for Alajuelense. Alonso scored a goal in the CONCACAF Champions' Cup 2008 quarter-final match against Atlante F.C. on March 19, 2008.

== Club career ==
Alonso made his debut in the Costa Rican Premier Division on 20 February 2002 for Deportivo Saprissa against Santos de Guápiles. He then spent two years on loan at Cartaginés and joined Alajuelense in 2012 after being released along with Esteban Sirias by Saprissa in December 2011.

== International career ==
He played in the 2001 FIFA U-17 World Championship finals in Trinidad and Tobago.

Alonso made his senior debut for Costa Rica in a March 2008 friendly match against Peru and has earned a total of 21 caps, scoring 3 goals. He has represented his country in 13 FIFA World Cup qualification matches and played at the 2009 CONCACAF Gold Cup and the 2011 Copa América.

His final international was a September 2010 friendly against Jamaica.

== Career statistics ==
=== International goals ===
Scores and results list. Costa Rica's goal tally first.

#	Date	Venue	Opponent	Score	Result	Competition
1.	10 June 2008	Grenada National Stadium, St. George's, Grenada	Grenada	1–2	2–2	World Cup qualifier
2.	6 September 2008	Estadio Ricardo Saprissa, San José, Costa Rica	Suriname	3–0	7–0	World Cup qualifier
3.	12 October 2008	André Kamperveen Stadion, Paramaribo, Suriname	Suriname	3–0	4–1	World Cup qualifier
