= Esteban Sirias =

Costa Rican footballer (born 1980)

Personal information
- Full name: Ángel Esteban Sirias Aviles
- Date of birth: 3 October 1980 (age 46)
- Place of birth: Alajuela, Costa Rica
- Height: 1.70 m (5 ft 7 in)
- Position: Left wing back

Team information
- Current team: AS Puma

Senior career*
Years	Team	Apps	(Gls)
1999–2005	Alajuelense		
2006–2007	Cartaginés	48	(3)
2007–2010	Liberia Mía	83	(7)
2010–2011	Saprissa	20	(0)
2012	Belén	5	(2)
2013–2014	Cartaginés	53	(3)
2014–	AS Puma	6	(0)

International career^{‡}
2007–2009	Costa Rica	13	(0)
- * Club domestic league appearances and goals as of October 31, 2014 ‡ National team caps and goals as of October 16, 2008

Ángel Esteban Sirias Aviles (born 3 October 1980) is a Costa Rican professional footballer who currently plays for AS Puma.

== Club career ==
Sirias made his professional debut for Alajuelense in a league match against Limonense on April 28, 1999, coming up as a substitute and playing 12 minutes. He spent six seasons with Liga, winning four league championships, one UNCAF club championship and one CONCACAF club championship. In January 2006, he moved to Cartaginés where he played until he joined Liberia Mía in June 2007. After spells with Saprissa and Belén, Sirias returned to Cartaginés in December 2012 but was dismissed by the club in March 2014. After considering retirement, he was persuaded by Marvin Chinchilla to move to AS Puma for the 2014 Invierno season.

=== Goalkeeper ===
His debut as goalkeeper was in a match of the season summer 2013 against Deportivo Saprissa. In the match the unique goalkeeper that Cartaginés had, Luis Torres, was expulsed for an action made in his area. Sirias was named the substitute goalkeeper, but did not manage to stop the penalty.

== International career ==
Sirias made his debut for Costa Rica in an August 2007 friendly match against Peru and earned a total of 13 caps, scoring no goals. He represented his country in 8 FIFA World Cup qualification matches and played at the 2009 CONCACAF Gold Cup.

His final international was a November 2009 FIFA World Cup qualification match against Uruguay.
