= Hernán Medford =

Costa Rican footballer (born 1968)

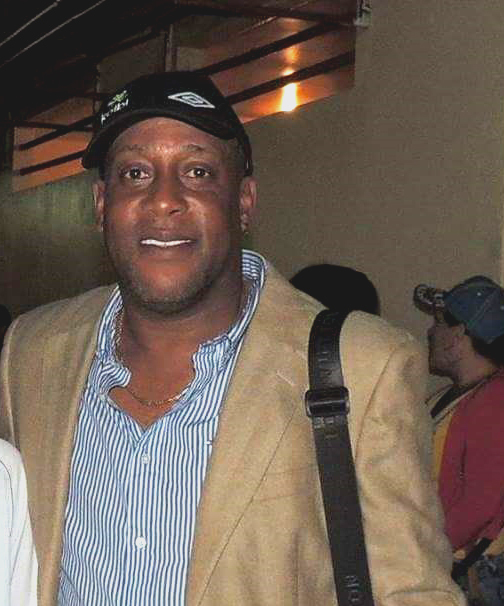

Personal information
- Full name: Hernán Evaristo Medford Bryan
- Date of birth: 23 May 1968 (age 58)
- Place of birth: San Jose, Costa Rica
- Height: 1.76 m (5 ft 9 in)
- Positions: Forward; winger

Team information
- Current team: Deportivo Saprissa (head coach)

Youth career
- 1980–1985: Barrio México

Senior career*
Years	Team	Apps	(Gls)
1986	Sagrada Familia	21	(2)
1987–1990	Saprissa	101	(30)
1990	Dinamo Zagreb	14	(4)
1991	Rapid Wien	14	(5)
1991–1992	Rayo Vallecano	30	(6)
1992–1993	Foggia	12	(1)
1993–1994	Saprissa	47	(20)
1994–1997	Pachuca	126	(36)
1997–2000	León	92	(18)
2000–2002	Necaxa	22	(6)
2002–2003	Saprissa	29	(7)
Total		508	(135)

International career^{‡}
1985	Costa Rica U17	11	(8)
1987–2002	Costa Rica	89	(18)

Managerial career
- 2003–2006: Saprissa
- 2006–2008: Costa Rica
- 2009: León
- 2010: Liberia Mía
- 2010–2011: Limón
- 2011–2013: Xelajú
- 2013–2014: Real España
- 2014: Honduras
- 2015: Real España
- 2015–2016: Xelajú
- 2016–2017: Herediano
- 2018: Municipal
- 2019: Herediano
- 2019: Real España
- 2019–2021: Cartaginés
- 2024–2025: Sporting San José
- 2025-: Marquense
- * Club domestic league appearances and goals as of 20 June 2006 ‡ National team caps and goals as of 20 June 2006

Hernán Evaristo Medford Bryan (/ɜːrˈnɑːn/ er-NAHN, Spanish: [eɾˈnam ˈmeðfoɾ(ð)]; born May 23, 1968) is a Costa Rican professional football manager and former player who is the head coach of Liga Guate club Marquense. Highly regarded as one of the most important figures in the history of Central American football, Medford achieved success as both a player and a coach.

As a player, Medford is fondly remembered in Costa Rica for two historic goals, both of which he considers his favorite, while playing for Costa Rica: the winning goal of a group stage match against Sweden to qualify to the knockout stage, and the winning goal of the Aztecazo, Mexico's first defeat in a non-friendly match at the Estadio Azteca.

Numerous media outlets regard Medford as the most successful coach in Central America, as he also found massive success across the region, winning championships in Costa Rica, Honduras, and Guatemala. He also coached Saprissa to win the 2005 CONCACAF Champions' Cup, thus qualifying to the 2005 FIFA Club World Championship, finishing in third place.

== Club career ==
Nicknamed Pelicano, or Pelican, Medford made his league debut for Sagrada Familia on 28 September 1986 against Cartaginés and scored his first goal on 4 January 1987 against Limonense. In Costa Rica's first division, he played for Deportivo Saprissa, where he won three national championships and the 1993 CONCACAF Champions Cup. After three years at Saprissa he played in several different leagues worldwide, including Serie A of Italy (Foggia Calcio), the Yugoslav First League (Dinamo Zagreb), the Austrian Bundesliga (SK Rapid Wien), La Liga in Spain (Rayo Vallecano), and the Primera División de México (Pachuca, León and Necaxa). Pachuca decided to retire Medford's number 17 after he scored his 100th goal in his career.

== International career ==
Medford was part of the 1985 FIFA U-16 World Championship held in China, the first FIFA World Cup tournament where Costa Rica ever appeared, and scored the first goal ever for his home country in this type of tournaments. He made his senior debut for Costa Rica in a February 1987 friendly match against South Korea and earned a total of 89 caps, scoring 18 goals. He represented his country in 37 FIFA World Cup qualification matches and played in two World Cups, Italy 1990 and Japan-Korea 2002. He scored a goal against Sweden in the 1990 World Cup, which resulted in qualification for the second round. He also scored the winning goal at the Azteca Stadium against Mexico in the qualification for the 2002 FIFA World Cup. The match, known as the Aztecazo, is one of only two World Cup qualifiers that Mexico have ever lost on home soil. He also played at the 1995 UNCAF Nations Cup as well as at the 1991, 2000, and 2002 CONCACAF Gold Cups and the 1997 and 2001 Copa Américas. His final international was a June 2002 FIFA World Cup match against Turkey.

== Managerial career ==
After retiring from professional football in 2003, he entered coaching. He first coached Deportivo Saprissa with great success, where he has won several championships, including 2 national tournaments, the Uncaf Cup and the CONCACAF Champions Cup, giving Saprissa the right to compete in the 2005 FIFA Club World Championship in Japan, in which Saprissa finished 3rd.

As of October 28, 2006, the Costa Rican Football Federation, or Federación Costarricense de Fútbol, announced him as the new head coach for the Costa Rica national football team. He was sacked on 28 June 2008 after a string of poor results and only a few wins, and showing unprecedent bias in favor of his old former players of Saprissa.

He took the reins of Club León for the Clausura 2009 season. His first game as head coach was against Tampico Madero, ending in a 1–1 tie. He was fired as manager by the president of the club owing to poor results in the pre-season and the season itself.

After leaving Club León Medford decided to take a break in coaching and decided to work as an administrator/manager but he was appointed manager of Liberia Mía in December 2009. In 2010 Hernan Medford signed with Limón, a club team from the province of Limon. He signed also as an administrator. The team seemed to have benefited from his previous experience as administrator. In June 2011 Carlos Pascal the team’s chairman was arrested due to accusations of drug trafficking leaving the club without a president. Medford tried to help the team survive this set back since without Pascal the team was left without financial support. Medford endured a difficult season with Limon F.C. In August 2011 Medford resigned, claiming it had nothing to do with the financial problems the club had suffered, but because of personal decisions. He took charge of Guatemalan side Xelajú in September 2011.

In May 2013, he was unveiled as the new manager of Honduran giants Real España. Under his direction Real España became the 2013 champion of the Honduran league. In July 2014 Medford was appointed the new national team manager of Honduras, leaving the post later in December due to the poor performance of the team during his tenure.

== Personal life ==
Medford is a son of Herman Medford Sterling and Gloria Bryan Givans and has two sisters. He has two daughters from his first marriage with Arlene Lewis. Currently he is married to model Ingrid Solís.

== Career statistics ==
Scores and results list Costa Rica's goal tally first, score column indicates score after each Medford goal.

List of international goals scored by Hernán Medford
No.	Date	Venue	Opponent	Score	Result	Competition
1	31 July 1988	Estadio Revolución, Panama City, Panama	Panama	2–0	2–0	1990 FIFA World Cup qualification
2	20 June 1990	Stadio Luigi Ferraris, Genoa, Italy	Sweden	2–1	2–1	1990 FIFA World Cup
3	1 July 1991	Rose Bowl, Pasadena, United States	Trinidad and Tobago	1–0	1–2	1991 CONCACAF Gold Cup
4	13 December 1992	Estadio Nacional de Costa Rica, San José, Costa Rica	Saint Vincent and the Grenadines	2–0	5–0	1994 FIFA World Cup qualification
5	17 November 1996	Estadio Ricardo Saprissa Aymá, San José, Costa Rica	Guatemala	2–0	3–0	1998 FIFA World Cup qualification
6	23 March 1997	Estadio Ricardo Saprissa Aymá, San José, Costa Rica	United States	1–1	3–2	1998 FIFA World Cup qualification
7	19 June 1997	Estadio Ramón Tahuichi Aguilera, San José, Bolivia	Mexico	1–1	1–1	1997 Copa América
8	9 November 1997	Estadio Azteca, Mexico City, Mexico	Mexico	1–2	3–3	1998 FIFA World Cup qualification
9	29 December 1999	Estadio Alejandro Morera Soto, Alajuela, Costa Rica	Honduras	1–0	1–1	Friendly
10	17 February 2000	LA Memorial Coliseum, Los Angeles, United States	South Korea	2–2	2–2	2000 CONCACAF Gold Cup
11	9 July 2000	Estadio Ricardo Saprissa Aymá, San José, Costa Rica	Saint Vincent and the Grenadines	2–0	7–1	Friendly
12	9 July 2000	Estadio Ricardo Saprissa Aymá, San José, Costa Rica	Saint Vincent and the Grenadines	3–0	7–1	Friendly
13	9 July 2000	Estadio Ricardo Saprissa Aymá, San José, Costa Rica	Saint Vincent and the Grenadines	4–1	7–1	Friendly
14	23 July 2000	Estadio Ricardo Saprissa Aymá, San José, Costa Rica	United States	2–1	2–1	2002 FIFA World Cup qualification
15	3 September 2000	Estadio Ricardo Saprissa Aymá, San José, Costa Rica	Barbados	3–0	3–0	2002 FIFA World Cup qualification
16	16 June 2001	Estadio Azteca, Mexico City, Mexico	Mexico	2–1	2–1	2002 FIFA World Cup qualification
17	11 January 2002	Estadio Alejandro Morera Soto, Alajuela, Costa Rica	Cameroon	2–1	2–1	Friendly
18	18 January 2002	Orange Bowl, Miami, United States	Martinique	1–0	2–0	2002 CONCACAF Gold Cup

== Honours ==
=== Player ===
Pachuca

- Primera División A: 1995–96

Rapid Wien

- Austrian Cup runner-up: 1990–91

Rayo Vallecano

- Segunda División runner-up: 1991–92

Saprissa

- Primera División: 1988, 1989, 1993–94
- CONCACAF Champions' Cup: 1993

Costa Rica

- CONCACAF Championship: 1989
- CONCACAF Gold Cup runner-up: 2002

Individual

- CONCACAF Team of the Century: 1998

=== Manager ===
Herediano

- Liga FPD: 2016 Verano, 2017 Verano; runner-up: 2016 Invierno, 2017 Apertura

Real España

- Honduran Liga Nacional: 2013 Apertura

Saprissa

- Primera División: 2003–04, 2005–06; runner-up: 2004–05
- CONCACAF Champions' Cup: 2005; runner-up: 2004
- FIFA Club World Championship third place: 2005
- UNCAF Interclub Cup: 2003; runner-up: 2004

Xelajú

- Guatemalan Liga Nacional: 2012 Clausura

Costa Rica

- UNCAF Nations Cup: 2007
