= Reynaldo Parks =

Costa Rican footballer (born 1974)

Personal information
- Full name: Reynaldo Parks Pérez
- Date of birth: 4 December 1974 (age 51)
- Place of birth: Limón, Costa Rica
- Height: 1.74 m (5 ft 9 in)
- Position: Defender

Senior career*
Years	Team	Apps	(Gls)
1991–1993	Limonense		
1993–1995	Herediano		
1996–1997	Municipal		
1997–2001	Tecos UAG	108	(8)
1997	→ Jaguares Colima (loan)		
2001–2007	Saprissa		
2002	→ La Piedad (loan)		
2007–2008	UCR	31	(9)
2008–2009	San Carlos	4	(0)
2009	Limonense		

International career^{‡}
1993–2003	Costa Rica	43	(1)
- * Club domestic league appearances and goals as of 17 October 2014 ‡ National team caps and goals as of 17 October 2014

Reynaldo Parks Pérez (born December 4, 1974) is a Costa Rican former football defender.

== Club career ==
He has played on different teams in Costa Rica, Mexico, and Guatemala. He started out in Costa Rica with his hometown team Limonense, and was later transferred to Herediano. Then he went on to play alongside compatriot Fernando Patterson with Municipal in Guatemala and Jaguares de Colima and Tecos UAG in Mexico, before coming back to Costa Rica to play for Saprissa and Universidad.

Parks was part of the team that played the 2005 FIFA Club World Championship, where Saprissa finished third behind São Paulo and Liverpool.

In 2008, he moved to San Carlos and retired in November 2009.

== International career ==
Parks made his debut for Costa Rica in a February 1993 UNCAF Nations Cup qualification match against Nicaragua and earned a total of 43 caps, scoring 1 goal. He represented his country in 15 FIFA World Cup qualification matches and played at the 1995 and 1999 UNCAF Nations Cups as well as at the 1993 and 2002 CONCACAF Gold Cups and the 2001 Copa América. Parks was a key member of the national team that qualified for the 2002 FIFA World Cup, serving as the captain. But just before the event started, a knee injury kept him away from participating and he was replaced by Pablo Chinchilla.

His final international was an October 2003 friendly match against South Africa.

=== International goals ===
Scores and results list Costa Rica's goal tally first.

N.	Date	Venue	Opponent	Score	Result	Competition
1.	6 January 2001	Orange Bowl, Miami, United States	Guatemala	3–1	2–5	2002 FIFA World Cup qualification

== Retirement ==
After retiring, Parks became chairman of the National Costa Rica Football Players Association but resigned from his post after 7 years in January 2014.

== Personal life ==
Parks was married to Irma Loaiciga Martinez, and they had three sons: Launy, Rey Jr, and Alanie Raquel Parks Loaiciga. His cousin Winston Parks also played for the Costa Rica national team.

== Honours ==
- Primera División de Costa Rica

2003–04, 2005–06, 2006–07

- CONCACAF Champions' Cup

2005

- Copa Interclubes UNCAF

2003
