= 2010 FIFA World Cup qualification (CONCACAF) =

Tournament details
- Dates: 3 February 2008 – 18 November 2009
- Teams: 35 (from 1 confederation)

Tournament statistics
- Matches played: 109
- Goals scored: 349 (3.2 per match)
- Attendance: 2,292,282 (21,030 per match)
- Top scorer(s): (El Salvador) Rudis Corrales (8 goals)

The CONCACAF (Confederation of North, Central American, and Caribbean Association Football) qualification stage for the 2010 FIFA World Cup in South Africa consisted of 35 national teams competing for the three berths given automatically to CONCACAF by FIFA. The United States, Mexico and Honduras qualified. The fourth-place finisher, Costa Rica, played a two-game playoff with the CONMEBOL fifth-place finisher, Uruguay, for a possible fourth berth.

== Format ==
For the first three rounds, a three group structure was created that spanned all three rounds. Each of the three groups had four sub-groups, with the winners of the 12 sub-groups advancing to the third round. The first and second rounds reduced the 35 entrants to 24 and 12 teams, respectively. The remaining 12 teams were then placed into three third-round groups of four based on the preliminary draw, with the top two teams in each group advancing to the fourth and final qualification group. The top three teams from the fourth round group of six (held from February to October 2009) qualified for the 2010 FIFA World Cup. The fourth-placed team competed in a home-and-away playoff against the 5th-place team from CONMEBOL.

== Seeding ==
The draw for the first three rounds took place on 25 November 2007 in Durban, South Africa, and it determined paths into each of the 12 slots of the three third round groups. In addition, because second round winners are paired off for the third round, the top 13 seeds were subdivided as follows:

- Pot A: The top 3 teams, who would be top seeds of each third round group.
- Pot B: The next 3 teams, who would be the seconds seeds of the third round groups.
- Pot C: The next 6 teams, who would receive a bye to the second round, and would not be drawn against a Pot A or Pot B team in that round.
- Pot D: St. Vincent and the Grenadines, who also receive a bye in the first round, but would be paired against one of the top 12 teams in Round 2.

In the second round, the 13 top-ranked CONCACAF teams from the May 2007 FIFA World Ranking joined 11 winners from the first round.

Pot A (byes to 2nd round) (ranked 1st to 3rd)	Pot B (byes to 2nd round) (ranked 4th to 6th)	Pot C (byes to 2nd round) (ranked 7th to 12th)
Mexico; United States; Costa Rica	Honduras; Panama; Trinidad and Tobago	Jamaica; Cuba; Haiti; Guatemala; Canada; Guyana
Pot D (bye to 2nd round) (ranked 13th)	Pot E (1st round) (ranked 14th to 24th)	Pot F (1st round) (ranked 25th to 35th)
Saint Vincent and the Grenadines	Barbados; Suriname; Bermuda; Antigua and Barbuda; Saint Kitts and Nevis; Dominican Republic; El Salvador; Bahamas; Nicaragua; Grenada; Saint Lucia	Turks and Caicos Islands; Netherlands Antilles; British Virgin Islands; Dominica; Cayman Islands; Puerto Rico; Anguilla; Belize; U.S. Virgin Islands; Montserrat; Aruba

== First round ==
The 22 teams ranked 14 to 35 competed in the first round. Teams ranked 14th–24th were randomly drawn against teams ranked 25th–35th. Teams played home and away against their opponents, except three ties: Puerto Rico–Dominican Republic, Grenada–U.S. Virgin Islands and Montserrat–Suriname, which were played over one leg in late March due to several Member Associations failing to meet the new FIFA Stadium standards and being unable to secure a home venue. The winners advanced to the second round.

Group 1

Team 1	Agg.	Team 2	1st leg	2nd leg
Dominica	1–2	Barbados	1–1	0–1
Turks and Caicos Islands	2–3	Saint Lucia	2–1	0–2
Bermuda	4–2	Cayman Islands	1–1	3–1
Aruba	0–4	Antigua and Barbuda	0–3	0–1

Group 2

Team 1	Agg.	Team 2	1st leg	2nd leg
Belize	4–2	Saint Kitts and Nevis	3–1	1–1
Bahamas	3–3 (a)	British Virgin Islands	1–1	2–2
Dominican Republic	0–1 (Note: This tie was played as a one leg tie in Puerto Rico, as the Dominican Republic failed to meet FIFA's new stadium standards and was unable to secure a home venue.)	Puerto Rico	—	0–1 (a.e.t.)

Group 3

Team 1	Agg.	Team 2	1st leg	2nd leg
U.S. Virgin Islands	0–10 (Note: This tie was played as a one leg tie in Grenada, as the U.S. Virgin Islands failed to meet FIFA's new stadium standards and was unable to secure a home venue.)	Grenada	—	0–10
Suriname	7–1 (Note: This tie was played as a one leg tie in Trinidad and Tobago, because neither side were able to provide a suitable venue according to FIFA's guidelines.)	Montserrat	—	7–1
El Salvador	16–0	Anguilla	12–0	4–0
Nicaragua	0–3	Netherlands Antilles	0–1	0–2

== Second round ==
In the second round, the 11 first round winners joined the 13 teams which received a bye to the second round. Teams ranked 1st–12th were randomly drawn against the unseeded teams (the 11 first round winners plus Saint Vincent and the Grenadines, which was ranked 13th). Teams played home and away against their opponents and the winners advanced to the next round. Matches took place in June 2008.

Group 1

Team 1	Agg.	Team 2	1st leg	2nd leg
United States	9–0	Barbados	8–0	1–0
Guatemala	9–1	Saint Lucia	6–0	3–1
Trinidad and Tobago	3–2	Bermuda	1–2	2–0
Antigua and Barbuda	3–8	Cuba	3–4	0–4

Group 2

Team 1	Agg.	Team 2	1st leg	2nd leg
Belize	0–9	Mexico	0–2	0–7
Jamaica	13–0	Bahamas	7–0	6–0
Honduras	6–2	Puerto Rico	4–0	2–2
Saint Vincent and the Grenadines	1–7 (Note: Order of legs reversed from originally published draw.)	Canada	0–3	1–4

Group 3

Team 1	Agg.	Team 2	1st leg	2nd leg
Grenada	2–5	Costa Rica	2–2	0–3
Suriname	3–1	Guyana	1–0	2–1
Panama	2–3	El Salvador	1–0	1–3
Haiti	1–0	Netherlands Antilles	0–0	1–0

== Third round ==
The winners from the second round were placed into three groups of four teams, where they played a double round robin home and away schedule. The top two teams from each group advanced to the fourth round.

=== Group 1 ===
Pos	Team	Pld	W	D	L	GF	GA	GD	Pts	(United States)	(Trinidad and Tobago)	(Guatemala)	(Cuba)
1	United States	6	5	0	1	14	3	+11	15	—	3–0	2–0	6–1
2	Trinidad and Tobago	6	3	2	1	9	6	+3	11	2–1	—	1–1	3–0
3	Guatemala	6	1	2	3	6	7	−1	5	0–1	0–0	—	4–1
4	Cuba	6	1	0	5	5	18	−13	3	0–1	1–3	2–1	—

=== Group 2 ===
Pos	Team	Pld	W	D	L	GF	GA	GD	Pts	(Honduras)	(Mexico)	(Jamaica)	(Canada)
1	Honduras	6	4	0	2	9	5	+4	12	—	1–0	2–0	3–1
2	Mexico	6	3	1	2	9	6	+3	10	2–1	—	3–0	2–1
3	Jamaica	6	3	1	2	6	6	0	10	1–0	1–0	—	3–0
4	Canada	6	0	2	4	6	13	−7	2	1–2	2–2	1–1	—

=== Group 3 ===
Pos	Team	Pld	W	D	L	GF	GA	GD	Pts	(Costa Rica)	(El Salvador)	(Haiti)	(Suriname)
1	Costa Rica	6	6	0	0	20	3	+17	18	—	1–0	2–0	7–0
2	El Salvador	6	3	1	2	11	4	+7	10	1–3	—	5–0	3–0
3	Haiti	6	0	3	3	4	13	−9	3	1–3	0–0	—	2–2
4	Suriname	6	0	2	4	4	19	−15	2	1–4	0–2	1–1	—

== Fourth round ==
The six teams that reached the fourth round formed one double-round-robin, home-and-away group nicknamed the "Hexagonal." The top three teams qualified for the 2010 FIFA World Cup. The fourth place team qualified for a home-and-away play-off against the fifth-place team from CONMEBOL.

The allocation of teams in the draw took place in Johannesburg, South Africa on 22 November 2008.

Pos	Team	Pld	W	D	L	GF	GA	GD	Pts	Qualification	(United States)	(Mexico)	(Honduras)	(Costa Rica)	(El Salvador)	(Trinidad and Tobago)
1	United States	10	6	2	2	19	13	+6	20	Qualification to 2010 FIFA World Cup	—	2–0	2–1	2–2	2–1	3–0
2	Mexico	10	6	1	3	18	12	+6	19	Qualification to 2010 FIFA World Cup	2–1	—	1–0	2–0	4–1	2–1
3	Honduras	10	5	1	4	17	11	+6	16	Qualification to 2010 FIFA World Cup	2–3	3–1	—	4–0	1–0	4–1
4	Costa Rica	10	5	1	4	15	15	0	16	Advance to inter-confederation play-offs	3–1	0–3	2–0	—	1–0	4–0
5	El Salvador	10	2	2	6	9	15	−6	8		2–2	2–1	0–1	1–0	—	2–2
6	Trinidad and Tobago	10	1	3	6	10	22	−12	6		0–1	2–2	1–1	2–3	1–0	—

== Inter-confederation play-offs ==
The 4th place team played the 5th place team from the CONMEBOL (South American Zone) Qualification in a home and away play-off. The winner of this play-off qualified for the 2010 FIFA World Cup.

The draw for the order in which the two matches were played was held on 2 June 2009 during the FIFA Congress in Nassau, the Bahamas. The CONCACAF side played the first leg at home.

Team 1	Agg.	Team 2	1st leg	2nd leg
Costa Rica	1–2	Uruguay	0–1	1–1

== Qualified teams ==
The following three teams from CONCACAF qualified for the final tournament.

Team	Qualified as	Qualified on	Previous appearances in FIFA World Cup^{1}
United States	fourth round winners	10 October 2009	8 (1930, 1934, 1950, 1990, 1994, 1998, 2002, 2006)
Mexico	fourth round runners-up	10 October 2009	13 (1930, 1950, 1954, 1958, 1962, 1966, 1970, 1978, 1986, 1994, 1998, 2002, 2006)
Honduras	fourth round third place	14 October 2009	1 (1982)

^{1} Bold indicates champions for that year. Italic indicates hosts for that year.

== Top goalscorers ==
There were 349 goals scored in 109 matches, for an average of 3.2 goals per match.

8 goals

- (El Salvador) Rudis Corrales

7 goals

- (Honduras) Carlos Pavón
- (Jamaica) Luton Shelton

6 goals

- (Canada) Ali Gerba
- (Costa Rica) Bryan Ruiz
- (El Salvador) Eliseo Quintanilla
- (Guatemala) Carlos Ruíz
- (Honduras) Carlo Costly
- (United States) Jozy Altidore

5 goals

- (Costa Rica) Celso Borges
- (Suriname) Wensley Christoph
- (United States) Clint Dempsey

Below are full goalscorer lists for each round:

- First round
- Second round
- Third round
- Fourth round
