= Vladimir Farrell =

Footballer (born 1981)

Personal information
- Full name: Vladimir Santos Farrell
- Date of birth: 31 May 1981 (age 45)
- Place of birth: San Pedro de Macorís, Dominican Republic
- Position: Striker

Senior career*
Years	Team	Apps	(Gls)
2008–2009	Sutton Town		
2009–2014	Hucknall Town	1	(0)
2015	Moca		

International career
2000–2010	Montserrat	12	(3)
- * Club domestic league appearances and goals

Vladimir Santos Farrell (born 31 May 1981) is a former footballer who played as a striker. Born in the Dominican Republic, he represented the Montserrat national team at international level.

== Career ==
Born in the Dominican Republic, Farrell and his family emigrated to Montserrat when he was a child.

He made his international debut for Montserrat in 2000, coincidentally, against Dominican Republic. He played in "The Other Final", squandering his team's only chance.

In February 2009 he signed for Conference North side Hucknall Town from Sutton Town, who he had joined the previous September.

He had previously played for South Normanton Athletic, Shirebrook Town and Long Eaton United.
