= Marvin Chinchilla =

Costa Rican footballer (born 1977)

Personal information
- Full name: Marvin Chinchilla Calderón
- Date of birth: February 11, 1977 (age 49)
- Place of birth: Costa Rica
- Position: Striker

Team information
- Current team: Puma Generaleña
- Number: 9

Senior career*
Years	Team	Apps	(Gls)
1997–2000	Pérez Zeledón		
2000–2002	Alajuelense		
2003	Pérez Zeledón		
2004	Cartaginés		
2004–2005	Liberia		
2006–2008	Santos de Guápiles		
2008	UCR		
2010–	Puma Generaleña		(39)

International career
1997	Costa Rica U-20		
1998–2000	Costa Rica U-23		
- * Club domestic league appearances and goals

Marvin Chinchilla Calderón (born 11 February 1977) is a Costa Rican football player who currently plays for Puma Generaleña in the Costa Rican Primera División.

== Club career ==
He played for several Costa Rica top-tier clubs, such as Pérez Zeledón, Alajuelense, Cartaginés and Liberia.

When Chinchilla was dismissed at Santos de Guápiles, he joined UCR in summer 2008 and then decided to start his own club with his brothers and bought the licence of second division side El Roble in 2009 to found Puma Generaleña for whom he became the club captain.

== International career ==
He played at the 1997 FIFA World Youth Championship, but never played for the senior Costa Rica national football team.

He also played in the football tournament of 1998 Central American and Caribbean Games

== Honours and awards ==
- Copa Interclubes UNCAF 2001
