= Michael Bethel =

Bahamian footballer

Personal information
- Date of birth: 21 April 1990 (age 36)
- Place of birth: Nassau, Bahamas
- Height: 5 ft 8 in (1.73 m)
- Position: Midfielder

Team information
- Current team: Lyford Cay

Youth career
- Bears

College career
| Years | Team | Apps | (Gls) |
| 2008–2010 | Tampa Spartans | 36 | (4) |

Senior career*
| Years | Team | Apps | (Gls) |
| 2012– | Renegades | | |

International career^{‡}
- Bahamas U17
- Bahamas U20
| 2008–2011 | Bahamas | 6 | (1) |
- * Club domestic league appearances and goals as of 7 December 2008 ‡ National team caps and goals as of 23 March 2021

Mike Bethel (born 21 April 1990) is a Bahamian footballer who plays for local side Renegades.

== Club career ==
Bethel attended St. Andrews School and joined the University of Tampa in 2008, for whom he scored 4 goals in 36 matches. He later returned to the Bahamas to join Lyford Cay.

== International career ==
He made his debut for the Bahamas national football team in a March 2008 World Cup qualification match against the British Virgin Islands. Bethel also played in the return match, scoring his first international goal. He had earned four caps by November 2008, all of them World Cup qualification games.

=== International goals ===
Scores and results list Bahamas' goal tally first.

| # | Date | Venue | Opponent | Score | Result | Competition | Refs |
|---|---|---|---|---|---|---|---|
| 1 | 30 March 2008 | BFA National Development Center, Nassau, Bahamas | British Virgin Islands | 1–0 | 2–2 | 2010 FIFA World Cup qualification | |

== Personal life ==
Born in Nassau, he is a son of Michael and Denise Bethel and has two sisters.
