= AS Puma Generaleña =

Costa Rican football club

Puma
- Full name: A.S. Puma Generaleña
- Nicknames: El Equipo del Pueblo; People´s team
- Founded: 2010
- Ground: Municipal Pérez Zeledón; San Isidro de El General, Costa Rica
- Capacity: 6,000
- Website: https://web.archive.org/web/20150217064436/http://www.aspumagene.com/
Home colours	Away colours	Third colours

AS Puma Generaleña was a professional football club in Costa Rica. They are based in San Isidro de El General and they played their home matches at the Estadio Municipal Pérez Zeledón.

== History ==
The club was only founded in 2010 after its predecessor Asociación Deportiva Generaleña merged in 1991 with Asociación Deportiva Pérez Zeledón to become Municipal Pérez Zeledón. After striker Marvin Chinchilla was dismissed by Santos de Guápiles, he decided to retire and start his own club along with his brothers Rigoberto, who became club president, German and Franklin. They took over the franchise of Second Division side El Roble FC de Alajuela and in May 2014 they won their first promotion to the Primera División de Costa Rica.

They became the third club in the league's history to last only one year at the highest level when they were relegated in April 2015.
