= Marshall Forbes =

Caymanian footballer

Personal information
- Full name: Marshall Lamar Forbes
- Date of birth: 16 November 1980 (age 45)
- Place of birth: George Town, Cayman Islands
- Position: Forward

College career
Years	Team	Apps	(Gls)
2005–2008	Lindsey Wilson College	61	(4)

Senior career*
Years	Team	Apps	(Gls)
2003–2016	Latinos FC		

International career
2002–2008	Cayman Islands	6	(2)
- * Club domestic league appearances and goals

Marshall Lamar Forbes-Moore (born 6 November 1980) is a Caymanian football forward. He has represented the Cayman Islands during World Cup qualifying matches in 2006 and 2010.
