= Alejandro Alpízar =

Costa Rican footballer (born 1979)

Personal information
- Full name: Alejandro Alpízar Delgado
- Date of birth: 14 June 1979 (age 47)
- Place of birth: Costa Rica
- Height: 1.76 m (5 ft 9 1/2 in)
- Position: Forward

Team information
- Current team: C.S. Uruguay
- Number: 10

Youth career
- Alajuelense

Senior career*
Years	Team	Apps	(Gls)
1997–2000	Alajuelense	23	(7)
2000–2001	→ UCR (loan)	?	(20)
2001–2002	→ Pérez Zeledón (loan)	39	(14)
2002–2006	Alajuelense	71	(25)
2006–2009	Saprissa	82	(29)
2009–2010	Liberia Mía	18	(6)
2010–2012	Alajuelense	34	(12)
2012	Xelajú	17	(7)
2013–2014	Alajuelense	43	(7)
2014–2015	Pérez Zeledón	14	(5)
2015–	C.S. Uruguay	15	(9)

International career^{‡}
2003–2009	Costa Rica	15	(3)
- * Club domestic league appearances and goals as of April 2015 ‡ National team caps and goals as of 20 October 2008

Alejandro Alpízar Delgado (born 14 June 1979) is a Costa Rican professional football player who plays for C.S. Uruguay.

Due to his haircut, facial hairstyle and his skinny figure, he was nicknamed El Mosquetero (The Musketeer), but is also known as Djorkaeff or El Matador.

== Club career ==
He made his professional debut for Alajuelense on 9 May 1999 against Herediano, then was loaned to Universidad de Costa Rica and spent the whole season playing in the second division. The following season, he was loaned again to Municipal Pérez Zeledón, and then came back to Alajuelense for a few more seasons. He suffered an injury to his knee, so he missed the entire 2005–2006 season, and by the end of the season he decided to move on and signed for Deportivo Saprissa. He signed up for the current local champion and became his best acquisition for this season.

His first season with Deportivo Saprissa was very hard; he did not score too much, but ended up with 13 assists. Later, he became one of the most dangerous forwards in the region, helping his team to earn the local title twice, being the top scorer of his team. In the summer of 2009 he left them for Liberia Mía after Saprissa did not meet his salary demands.

In June 2012 he moved abroad to play in Guatemala for Hernán Medford's Xelajú, but did not return to them ahead of the 2013 Clausura because he was not allowed to leave Costa Rica. He then rejoined Alajuelense.

== International career ==
Alpízar made his debut for Costa Rica in a February 2003 UNCAF Nations Cup match against Nicaragua and earned a total of 15 caps, scoring 3 goals. He has represented his country in 5 FIFA World Cup qualification matches and played at the 2003 and 2009 UNCAF Nations Cups.

His final international was a February 2009 UNCAF Nations Cup match against Panama. Alpízar also played for Costa Rica at the 2000 FIFA Futsal World Championship finals.

== Career statistics ==
=== International goals ===
Scores and results list. Costa Rica's goal tally first.

#	Date	Venue	Opponent	Score	Result	Competition
1.	26 March 2008	Estadio Max Agustin, Iquitos, Peru	Peru	1–1	1–3	Friendly
2.	6 September 2008	Estadio Ricardo Saprissa, San José, Costa Rica	Suriname	3–0	7–0	World Cup qualifier
3.	10 September 2008	Stade Sylvio Cator, Port-au-Prince, Haiti	Haiti	3–1	3–1	World Cup qualifier
