= Wardy Alfaro =

Costa Rican footballer (born 1977)

Personal information
- Full name: Wardy Alfaro Pizarro
- Date of birth: 31 December 1977 (age 48)
- Place of birth: Alajuela, Costa Rica
- Height: 1.80 m (5 ft 11 in)
- Position: Goalkeeper

Senior career*
Years	Team	Apps	(Gls)
1998–1999	Santos de Guápiles		
1999–2001	Guanacasteca		
2001–2004	Cartaginés	67	
2004–2010	Alajuelense	154	(0)
2010–2011	Santos de Guápiles	52	(0)
2012–2014	Cartaginés	40	(0)

International career^{‡}
2006–2007	Costa Rica	5	(0)
- * Club domestic league appearances and goals as of 11 December 2011 ‡ National team caps and goals as of 4 January 2009

Wardy Alfaro Pizarro (born 31 December 1977) is a retired Costa Rican football player, who currently is goalkeeper coach at Alajuelense.

He played as a goalkeeper, and was one of three that were named in the Costa Rica national squad for the 2006 World Cup held in Germany.

== Club career ==
He started his career playing in the Costa Rican Second Division with Santos de Guápiles and then he moved to AD Guanacasteca. Then in 2001, Cartaginés decided to bring him to the top division. He debuted on September 16 of that year against Pérez Zeledón and soon became a valuable player for this team, helping them to stay at the top division with his great saves. By the end of the 2003-2004 season, Alajuelense decided to loan Ricardo González to the Guatemalan club Comunicaciones so they asked Cartaginés to have him loaned. He debuted with his new team on April 25 of 2004 and became usual at the starting line-up soon after he got to the team. By the end of this season Alajuelense decided to purchase him and he went on to play 154 league games for Liga.

In 2010, Alfaro rejoined his first club Santos and in 2012 he returned to Cartaginés. Besides football, he owns an inflatable games rental company in El Tejar de El Guarco where he lives.

In December 2014, Alfaro retired and was named goalkeeper coach at Alajuelense.

== International career ==
Alfaro made his debut for Costa Rica in a friendly game against South Korea on 11 February 2006 and has earned 5 caps, scoring no goals. He has represented his country at the 2007 UNCAF Nations Cup and was a non-playing squad member at the 2006 FIFA World Cup and 2007 CONCACAF Gold Cup.
