= Víctor Núñez =

Costa Rican footballer (born 1980)

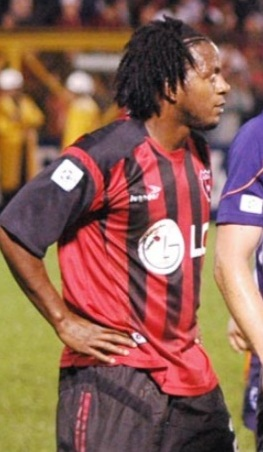

Personal information
- Full name: Víctor Amaury Núñez Rodríguez
- Date of birth: 15 April 1980 (age 46)
- Place of birth: Santo Domingo, Dominican Republic
- Height: 1.78 m (5 ft 10 in)
- Position: Forward

Team information
- Current team: Heredia U17 Manager

Youth career
- Saprissa

Senior career*
Years	Team	Apps	(Gls)
1999–2003	Saprissa	48	(11)
2000–2001	→ Limonense (loan)	31	(21)
2002–2003	→ Santa Bárbara (loan)	18	(16)
2003–2008	Alajuelense	57	(26)
2004–2006	→ Cartaginés (loan)	53	(29)
2008–2010	Liberia Mía	51	(31)
2010–2015	Herediano	105	(52)
2015	Real España	19	(2)
2015–2016	Santos de Guápiles	21	(11)
2016–2017	Herediano	48	(13)
2018	Santos de Guápiles	6	(1)
2018–2019	Cibao	1	(1)
Total		458	(214)

International career
2006–2013	Costa Rica	27	(7)
- * Club domestic league appearances and goals

Víctor Amaury Núñez Rodríguez (born 15 April 1980) is a retired professional footballer who played as a forward for multiple clubs, including C.S. Herediano, L.D. Alajuelense, and Deportivo Saprissa. He currently serves as assistant coach at C.S. Herediano.

He has the all-time record for the number of goals in Costa Rica's first division.

Born in the Dominican Republic, Núñez moved to Costa Rica at age 9. He was naturalised there on 31 January 2003, and subsequently opted to play internationally for the Costa Rica national team.

== Club career ==
Nuñez began his career in the minor league system of Deportivo Saprissa where he played his first seasons. He made his professional debut in a league match against Goicoechea on 16 December 1999.

Nuñez scored his first goal on 12 October 2000 against Alajuelense while playing on loan for Limonense. He has led the league in goal-scoring four times (Invierno 2007, Invierno 2008, Invierno 2009 and Verano 2013) and became the top active league goalscorer in March 2009 while becoming the second player to score more than 200 league goals in November 2013. He simultaneously amassed a total of 217 goals in all games, only 30 short of Costa Rican recordholder Juan Ulloa.

His nickname, El Mambo, references the traditional rhythm of his home country (mambo).

He never fully earned trust at Saprissa so he was loaned again once he went back to them. After a few bad disappointing seasons with Saprissa but with a high recognition in the country, he was signed by Saprissa's archrival Alajuelense. He did not have a lot of options during his first year, so he was, again, loaned to Cartaginés and after an amazing campaign he returned to Alajuelense and finally became an important piece of the team. In July 2010, he joined Herediano from Águilas Guanacastecas. After four years with Herediano, Núñez moved abroad to play for Honduran side Real España.

On 23 June 2018, he was signed by Cibao FC in his natal country, Dominican Republic, where he will not occupy a place of foreigners.

== International career ==
Núñez made his debut for Costa Rica in a February 2006 friendly match against South Korea and has, as of May 2014, earned a total of 28 caps, scoring 6 goals. He represented his country in 7 FIFA World Cup qualification matches and was part of the Costa Rica squad for 2006 FIFA World Cup held in Germany, making him the first Dominican Republic-born athlete to compete in a FIFA World Cup..

He also played at the 2009 UNCAF Nations Cup and 2011 Copa Centroamericana

== Career statistics ==
=== International ===
Appearances and goals by national team and year
National team	Year	Apps	Goals
Costa Rica	2006	3	0
Costa Rica	2007	6	3
Costa Rica	2008	8	3
Costa Rica	2009	5	0
Costa Rica	2010	1	0
Costa Rica	2011	3	1
Costa Rica	2012	–	
Costa Rica	2013	2	0
Total		28	7

=== International goals ===
Scores and results list Costa Rica's goal tally first.

No.	Date	Venue	Opponent	Score	Result	Competition
1	12 September 2007	National Soccer Stadium, Toronto, Canada	Canada	1–0	1–1	Friendly
2	13 October 2007	Estadio Cuscatlán, San Salvador, El Salvador	El Salvador	1–0	2–2	Friendly
3	21 November 2007	Estadio Rod Carew, Panama City, Panama	Panama	1–1	1–1	Friendly
4	6 February 2008	Independence Park, Kingston, Jamaica	Jamaica	1–1	1–1	Friendly
5	14 June 2008	Grenada National Stadium, St. George's, Grenada	Grenada	2–2	2–2	2010 FIFA World Cup qualification
6	15 October 2008	Estadio Ricardo Saprissa, San José, Costa Rica	Haiti	2–0	2–0	2010 FIFA World Cup qualification
7	14 January 2011	Estadio Rommel Fernández, Panama City, Panama	Honduras	1–0	1–1	2011 Copa Centroamericana
