= Pablo Izaguirre =

Argentine footballer and coach

Personal information
- Full name: Pablo Alejandro Izaguirre
- Date of birth: April 9, 1970 (age 56)
- Place of birth: Avellaneda, Argentina
- Height: 1.70 m (5 ft 7 in)
- Position: Midfielder

Team information
- Current team: LD Alajuelense (assistant head coach)

Youth career
- Independiente

Senior career*
Years	Team	Apps	(Gls)
1997	San Martín (T)	8	(0)
1997	Blooming		
1998	Unión de Santa Fe		
1999	Cerro Corá		
–	Nacional		
1999–2006	Alajuelense	186	(34)
- * Club domestic league appearances and goals

Pablo Alejandro Izaguirre (born April 9, 1970, in Avellaneda) is a former Argentine football player who is currently LD Alajuelense's Assistant Head Coach.

He played in Argentina, Paraguay, Uruguay and Bolivia, but his best years were in the Costa Rican Primera División playing for LD Alajuelense. He made his debut in Costa Rican Primera División back on 1999 playing for LD Alajuelense against Deportivo Saprissa, but only lasted 11 minutes on the field where he received two early yellow cards. That was probably the worst game he had, after returning from suspension, he became one of the most beloved players in the history of the institution. He declared that his time in Costa Rica was the most important thing in his career and after his retirement, he decided to stay in the country and help his beloved team with their youth teams.

In 2007, he began coaching, first with Carlos Restrepo as the head coach and currently as assistant coach with Luis Diego Arnáez as the head coach. They were teammates as a players from 1999 until 2005 when they decided to retire.
