= Wensley Christoph =

Surinamese football player

Personal information
- Date of birth: 9 December 1984 (age 41)
- Place of birth: Paramaribo, Suriname
- Position: Forward

Senior career*
| Years | Team | Apps | (Gls) |
| 2003–2006 | Cosmos | ? | (?) |
| 2006–2009 | Super Red Eagles | ? | (?) |
| 2009– | Excelsior | ? | (?) |

International career^{‡}
| 2004 – | Suriname | 22 | (6) |
- * Club domestic league appearances and goals as of 19 November 2008 ‡ National team caps and goals as of 19 November 2008

Wensley Christoph (born 9 December 1984 in Paramaribo) is a Surinamese football player. He is capped for Suriname's national team. Christoph has played for Suriname in qualifying matches for the 2006 and 2010 World Cups. In the 2010 qualifying campaign, he was Suriname's top goalscorer with five goals. He currently plays club football for SV Notch in the SVB Topklasse in Suriname and leads now in the football season 2017 the topscorerslist with 7 goals.
