= Eliseo Quintanilla =

Salvadoran footballer (born 1983)

Personal information
- Full name: Eliseo Antonio Quintanilla Ortíz
- Date of birth: 5 February 1983 (age 43)
- Place of birth: Santa Tecla, El Salvador
- Height: 1.68 m (5 ft 6 in)
- Positions: Winger; attacking midfielder

Youth career
- 1998–1999: Municipal Tecleño

Senior career*
Years	Team	Apps	(Gls)
1999–2000	FAS	19	(7)
2001–2002	Águila	50	(18)
2003–2004	D.C. United	27	(5)
2005	Alianza	18	(1)
2005–2007	San Salvador	47	(19)
2008	Alajuelense	30	(10)
2008–2009	Águila	11	(6)
2009	Ermis Aradippou	17	(3)
2009–2010	Correcaminos	17	(1)
2010–2011	Luis Ángel Firpo	35	(9)
2011–2012	Municipal	39	(9)
2012–2013	Isidro Metapán	15	(6)
2014	Águila	1	(0)

International career
2000–2012	El Salvador	69	(15)
- * Club domestic league appearances and goals

Eliseo Antonio Quintanilla Ortíz (born 5 February 1983), nicknamed El Cheyo, is a Salvadoran former professional footballer.

== Club career ==
Nicknamed Cheyo, Quintanilla started his professional career at Salvadorian giants FAS, making his professional debut in 1999 at age 16. In 2001, he moved to rivals Águila and while with them, he played in a friendly in Los Angeles.

=== Major League Soccer ===
The management at Major League Soccer outfit D.C. United watched the game tapes and signed the small playmaker with the club in 2002. Injuries however curtailed his MLS career. He scored just five goals and five assists in two years in the league, missing all of 2004 with an injury, and was subsequently released. In 2004, he was injured at a preseason training camp and was unable to play the entire season.

He returned to play in his native country but in 2008, Quintanilla signed a five-month deal with Costa Rican football club L.D. Alajuelense. After being released he again returned to El Salvador, where he rejoined Águila for two years.

=== Europe ===
In May 2009, Quintanilla signed to newly promoted Cypriot team Ermis Aradippou for the 2009/2010 season. His stay was somewhat short-lived, only playing 10 domestic league games and scoring one goal in the Cypriot Cup.

On 16 December 2009, Mexican lower league side Correcaminos UAT confirmed acquiring Quintanilla on a six-month contract. Shortly after Correcaminos were eliminated in the quarter-finals, it was announced that Quintanilla would no longer continue with the club. Quintanilla made 17 league appearances and only scored one goal for the club.

In May 2010, Quintanilla signed a one-year contract with Luis Ángel Firpo and on 24 May 2011, Quintanilla signed with Guatemalan club Municipal. Quintanilla scored an amazing goal from a free kick on 1 December 2011 against Marquense. The goal won the "Premios Matador" prize on ESPN Deportes. He received 96%, from the 10 players voting, which broke the voting record for "Premios Matador".

=== Match-fixing ban ===
On 20 September 2013, Quintanilla was banned for 6 months due to his involvement with match fixing.

== International career ==
Quintanilla made his debut for El Salvador, aged 16 years, in a February 2000 friendly match against Honduras and has, as of December 2011, earned a total of 59 caps, scoring 15 goals. He has represented his country in 19 FIFA World Cup qualification matches and played at the 2007 and 2009 UNCAF Nations Cups, as well as at the 2007, 2009 and 2011 CONCACAF Gold Cups.

On 22 June 2008, Eliseo scored two goals as El Salvador came back in a thriller to defeat Panama, 3–1. With the win, El Salvador advanced to Round 3 in the CONCACAF Zone in the World Cup Qualifiers for Africa 2010.

On 28 March 2009, Quintanilla scored his twelfth, and quite possibly most memorable goal with the national team. The goal came in a World Cup qualification match against the USA and marked the first time in over eleven years that El Salvador had managed to score a goal against them. The match ultimately ended in a 2–2 draw.

=== International goals ===
No.	Date	Venue	Opponent	Score	Result	Competition	Ref.
1.	24 January 2007	Estadio Cuscatlán, San Salvador, El Salvador	Denmark	1–0	1–0	Friendly	
2.	8 February 2007	Estadio Cuscatlán, San Salvador, El Salvador	Belize	2–0	2–1	2007 UNCAF Nations Cup	
3.	10 February 2007	Estadio Cuscatlán, San Salvador, El Salvador	Nicaragua	1–0	2–1	2007 UNCAF Nations Cup	
4.	10 February 2007	Estadio Cuscatlán, San Salvador, El Salvador	Nicaragua	2–1	2–1	2007 UNCAF Nations Cup	
5.	8 September 2007	Estadio Olímpico Atahualpa, Quito, Ecuador	Ecuador	1–2	1–5	Friendly	
6.	13 October 2007	Estadio Cuscatlán, San Salvador, El Salvador	Costa Rica	1–2	2–2	Friendly	
7.	6 February 2008	Estadio Cuscatlán, San Salvador, El Salvador	Anguilla	9–0	12–0	2010 FIFA World Cup qualification	
8.	22 June 2008	Estadio Cuscatlán, San Salvador, El Salvador	Panama	1–1	3–1	2010 FIFA World Cup qualification	
9.	22 June 2008	Estadio Cuscatlán, San Salvador, El Salvador	Panama	2–1	3–1	2010 FIFA World Cup qualification	
10.	15 October 2008	Estadio Cuscatlán, San Salvador, El Salvador	Suriname	2–0	3–0	2010 FIFA World Cup qualification	
11.	22 October 2008	Robert F. Kennedy Stadium, Washington, D.C., United States	Bolivia	1–0	2–0	Friendly	
12.	28 March 2009	Estadio Cuscatlán, San Salvador, El Salvador	United States	1–0	2–2	2010 FIFA World Cup qualification	
13.	6 June 2009	Estadio Cuscatlán, San Salvador, El Salvador	Mexico	2–1	2–1	2010 FIFA World Cup qualification	
14.	3 March 2010	Los Angeles Coliseum, Los Angeles, United States	Guatemala	2–1	2–1	Friendly	
15.	12 June 2011	Soldier Field, Chicago, United States	Cuba	6–1	6–1	2011 CONCACAF Gold Cup	

=== Overall international ===
Season	Games Started	Substituted In	Goals
2000	0	1	0
2006	3	0	0
2007	15	1	6
2008	8	1	5
2009	15	1	2
2010	3	0	1
2011	6	2	1
Total	50	6	15

== Honours ==
=== Club honours ===
- Municipal
  - Liga Nacional de Fútbol de Guatemala (1): 2011 Apertura
- Metapan
  - Salvadoran Primera División (1): Apertura 2012
