= Dia =

DIA or Dia may refer to:

== Government establishments ==
- Defence Industry Agency, Turkey
- Defense Intelligence Agency, United States foreign military intelligence agency
- Defence Intelligence Agency (India) Indian foreign military intelligence agency
- Defence Intelligence Agency (Nigeria)
- Defense Intelligence Agency (South Korea)
- Department of Internal Affairs, New Zealand public service department
- Department of Indian Affairs, Canadian federal department
- Direzione Investigativa Antimafia, an Italian law-enforcement agency

== Organizations and businesses ==
=== Airports ===
- Davao International Airport (DVO)
- Denver International Airport (DEN)
- Dubai International Airport (DXB)
- Doha International Airport (DIA)
- Durban International Airport (DUR)
- Washington Dulles International Airport (IAD)

=== Arts ===
- Design Institute of Australia, Australian design organisation
- Detroit Institute of Arts, American art museum
- Dia Art Foundation, non-profit arts organization

=== Charity ===
- Design and Industries Association, British charity

=== Education ===
- Dubai International Academy, a private school in the United Arab Emirates.

=== Entertainment ===
- Dia (film), a 2020 Indian Kannada language film
- DIA (group), a South Korean girl group
- Dia (singer), stage name for Kim Ji-Eun, a South Korean female singer

=== Trade ===
- Dia (supermarket chain), Spanish multinational supermarket chain

=== Youth ===
- Detroit International Academy for Young Women
- Development in Action (DiA), a youth-led UK NGO focusing on international development and global citizenship amongst young people
- Sakartvelos Gogona Skautebis Asociacia 'Dia', the Georgian Girl Scout Association

== Places ==
- Diá, Drôme, France
- Dia (Bithynia), an ancient town of Bithynia
- Dia (Coele-Syria), an ancient city of Coele-Syria
- Dia (island), Greek island off the coast of Crete
- Dia, Mali
- Dia (moon), a moon of Jupiter
- Naxos (island), Greek island in the Aegean, named Dia by the ancient Greeks

== Publications ==
- Al Día (disambiguation), various newspapers
- El Día (disambiguation), various newspapers
- O Dia, Brazilian newspaper
- Türkiye Diyanet Vakfı İslâm Ansiklopedisi (DİA) or İslâm Ansiklopedisi, Turkish encyclopedia for Islamic studies
- El Nuevo Dia Puerto Rican newspaper, commonly referred to as "El Dia"

== Science and technology ==
- Dia (software), a software program for diagram creation
- Document Interchange Architecture, an IBM standard for electronic mail, part of IBM Systems Application Architecture

== Other uses ==
- Dea Dia, lit. 'goddess Dia', a Roman goddess
- Dia (mythology), name of multiple figures in Greek mythology
- Dia (name), and persons with the name
- Dia language, a Torricelli language of Papua New Guinea
- Diameter, the width of a circle, often abbreviated to "dia."
- Diamond (Shugo Chara!), also known as Dia, a character from the manga series Shugo Chara!
- SS Dia, British cargo ship that sank in the Mediterranean in 1964
- Dow Diamonds (NYSE: DIA), an exchange-traded fund tracking the Dow Jones Industrial Average
- Data-independent acquisition, an acquisition type in mass spectrometry
- Diisopropylamine, a common organic base and precursor to Lithium Diisopropylamide

== See also ==
- Diaa, a given name
- Diya (disambiguation)
