= Dip =

Dip or DIP may refer to:

== Arts and entertainment ==
- The Dip, the tenth published book by Seth Godin
- Dip (album), a 2007 studio album by Scottish musician Aidan Moffat
- "Dip", a single by Danny Brown from his 2013 album Old
- "Dip" (song), a 2018 song by Tyga
- Dip (TV series), an online 201 Turkish TV series
- Death in Paradise (TV series), a 2011 British-French TV series

== Exercise ==
- Dip, a brief swim; for example skinny dipping
- Dip (dance move), a partner dance move
- Dip (exercise), a type of strength training exercise
  - Dip bar, a piece of fitness equipment

== Organisations ==
- DIP Research (Distributed Information Processing), a defunct company which designed the Atari Portfolio
- Revolutionary Workers' Party (Turkey)

== Places ==
- Dezhou East railway station (China Railway telegraph code)
- Diapaga Airport (IATA airport code), Burkina Faso
- Dubai Investments Park, United Arab Emirates

== Science and technology ==
=== Biology and medicine ===
- Database of Interacting Proteins, a catalog of protein interactions
- Defective interfering particle, a virus particle that is missing part or all of its genome
- Deletion/insertion polymorphism, a type of Mutation
- Desquamative interstitial pneumonia, a form of idiopathic interstitial pneumonia
- Distal interphalangeal joint (disambiguation), in anatomy

=== Computing ===
- Dependency inversion principle, in software architecture design
- Device-independent pixel or density-independent pixel (dip), a unit of measurement
- Digital image processing
- Directors IP address, in the Linux Virtual Server
- Distributed information processing
- Document image processing

=== Electronics ===
- Dual in-line package, a type of integrated circuit packaging
  - DIP switch, a number of electric switches in a dual in-line package
  - DIP DRAM, a memory module format for computers
- Voltage dip, a short-duration reduction in the voltage
- Dip reader, device for reading an electronically encoded card

=== Earth ===
- Dip (geology) (strike and dip), the orientation or attitude of a geologic feature
- Dip slope, a slope parallel to the dip in geology
- Dip circle, used to measure the angle between magnetic dip and the horizon
- Magnetic dip, the angle made with the horizontal at any point by the Earth's magnetic field
- Horizon dip, the angle below horizontal for an elevated observer at sea

=== Other science and technology ===
- Deinked pulp, in paper production
- Diiminopyridine, a class of ligand, in chemistry
- Diindenoperylene, an organic semiconductor
- Diisopinocampheyl, a stereoselection ligand
- Dip (geometry), a decagonal prism

== People ==
- Dip, a name in Gujarati meaning Diya (lamp)
- Dip Gogoi (born 1951), Indian politician
- Dip Orange (1900–1946), American baseball infielder

== Other uses ==
- Debtor in possession, a type of financing
- Dipping tobacco, a colloquial name for American moist snuff
- Dip (Catalan myth), an evil demonic dog that drinks people's blood
- Dip pen, a pen, also called a nib pen
- Diploma (abbreviation)
- Dipping sauce or dip, a condiment
- Direct Income Payments, agricultural support payments in the European Union
- Drug Interventions Programme, run by the United Kingdom's government
- Drunk in public, a summary offense in many countries
- Ductile iron pipe, a pipe made of ductile cast iron commonly used for potable water transmission and distribution
- Dvukhmyestnyi Istrebitel Pushechny ("twin-engined cannon fighter"), the military designation of the Tupolev ANT-29
- Flag dipping, to dip a flag that is being carried as a sign of respect or deference
- Plunge dip, a method of immersing livestock in pesticide

== See also ==
- Dipa (given name)
- DIPS (disambiguation)
- Dipping (disambiguation)
- Dip angle (disambiguation)
- Deep (disambiguation)
