= Raofat =

Raofat (Arabic: رفعت) is an Egyptian surname. Notable people with the surname include:

- Diaa Raofat (born 1988), Egyptian footballer
- Rami Raofat (born 1990), Egyptian-Danish footballer

== See also ==
- Rafat (surname)
