= Álvaro Saborío =

Costa Rican footballer (born 1982)

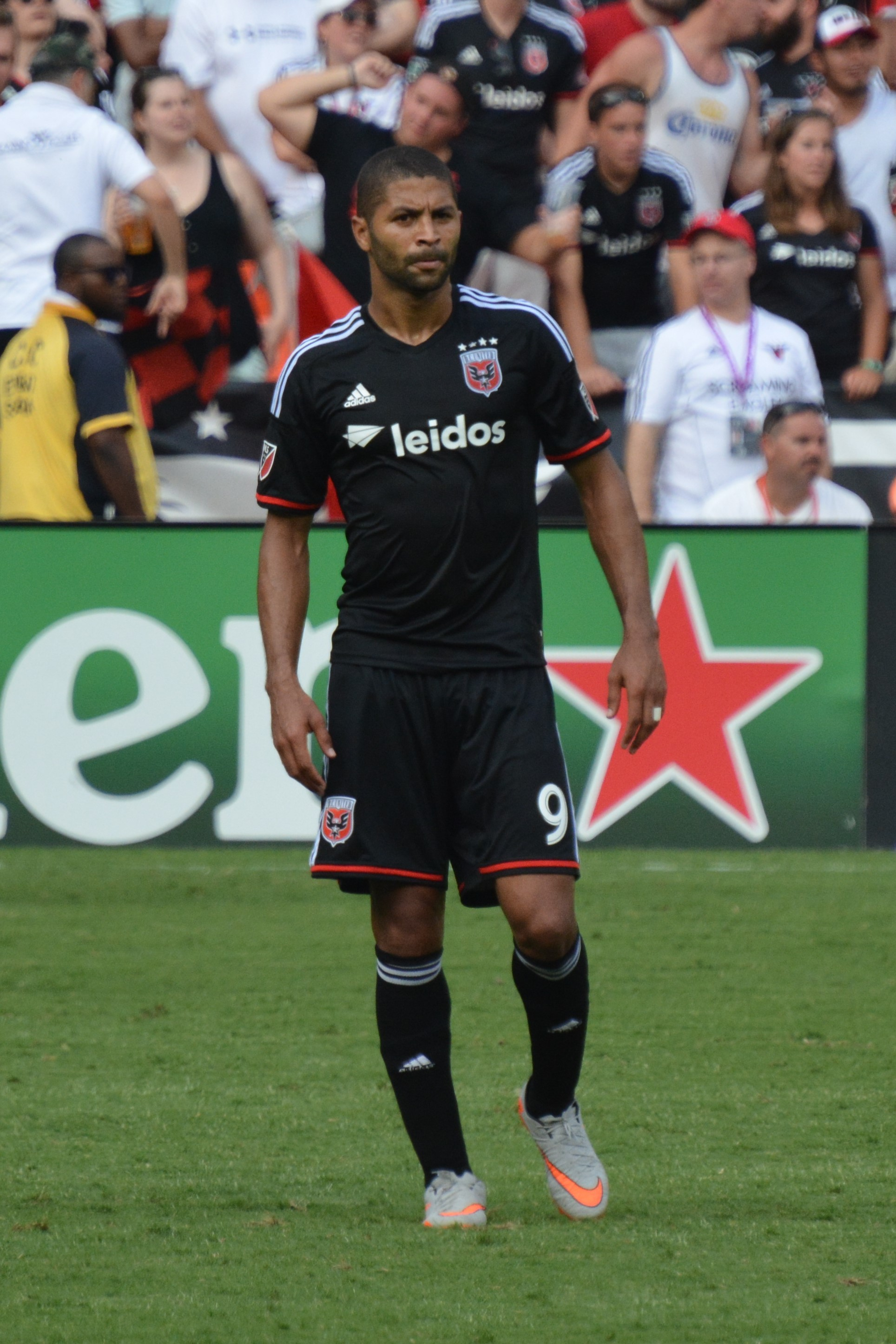
- Saborío playing for D.C. United in 2015

Personal information
- Full name: Álvaro Alberto Saborío Chacón
- Date of birth: 25 March 1982 (age 44)
- Place of birth: Ciudad Quesada, Costa Rica
- Height: 1.83 m (6 ft 0 in)
- Position: Forward

Youth career
- Monterrey B
- Coyotes de Saltillo

Senior career*
Years	Team	Apps	(Gls)
2001–2006	Saprissa	149	(95)
2006–2010	Sion	87	(36)
2009–2010	→ Bristol City (loan)	19	(2)
2010	→ Real Salt Lake (loan)	27	(12)
2011–2015	Real Salt Lake	100	(51)
2015–2016	D.C. United	31	(10)
2017	Saprissa	4	(1)
2018–2022	San Carlos	125	(62)
2020	→ Alajuelense (loan)	18	(6)
2023	San Carlos	8	(2)
Total		568	(277)

International career
2004	Costa Rica U23	15	(13)
2002–2021	Costa Rica	112	(36)
- * Club domestic league appearances and goals

Álvaro Alberto Saborío Chacón (Spanish pronunciation: [ˈalβaɾo saβoˈɾi.o]; born 25 March 1982) is a Costa Rican former professional footballer, who played as a forward. Saborío originally retired in 2017 but returned months later.

A full international for Costa Rica since 2002, Saborío has over 110 caps and 36 goals for the nation, whom he represented at five CONCACAF Gold Cups, in addition to one tournament each at the Olympics, FIFA World Cup, and Copa América.

== Club career ==
Saborío is a product of C.F. Monterrey's youth system. He played with the club's reserve team in the Segunda División de México and with affiliate Coyotes de Saltillo in the Primera A.

=== Deportivo Saprissa ===
Saborio began his professional career with Saprissa in his native Costa Rica. He made his Costa Rican Primera División debut against Limonense on 8 August 2001. Saborío was the leading goal-scorer of the 2003–2004 Costa Rican season, finishing the year with 25 goals, five above Whayne Wilson.

With Saprissa, he has won a league title and a CONCACAF Champions Cup and was part of the team that played the 2005 FIFA Club World Championship, where Saprissa finished third behind São Paulo and Liverpool. At the tournament, he scored two goals and ended up tied with three other players for top scoring honors.

=== FC Sion ===
He moved to Swiss Super League outfit FC Sion after playing for Costa Rica at the 2006 World Cup. He formed a good partnership at FC Sion with Poland's Zbigniew Zakrzewski.

His performances in Switzerland reportedly caught the eye of Stoke City's manager Tony Pulis who aimed to sign him in the summer of 2009, however he instead joined Bristol City on loan.

=== Bristol City ===
Saborío played his first game for Bristol City in a Championship match on 13 September against Coventry City making an impact by setting up fellow striker Nicky Maynard. Saborío also picked up his first yellow card in English football as the match ended in a 1–1 draw. Saborio scored his first goal for Bristol City in their 1–1 draw with Scunthorpe United.

He left Bristol City, and his contract was terminated with FC Sion in February 2010 so that he could return to Costa Rica.

=== Real Salt Lake ===
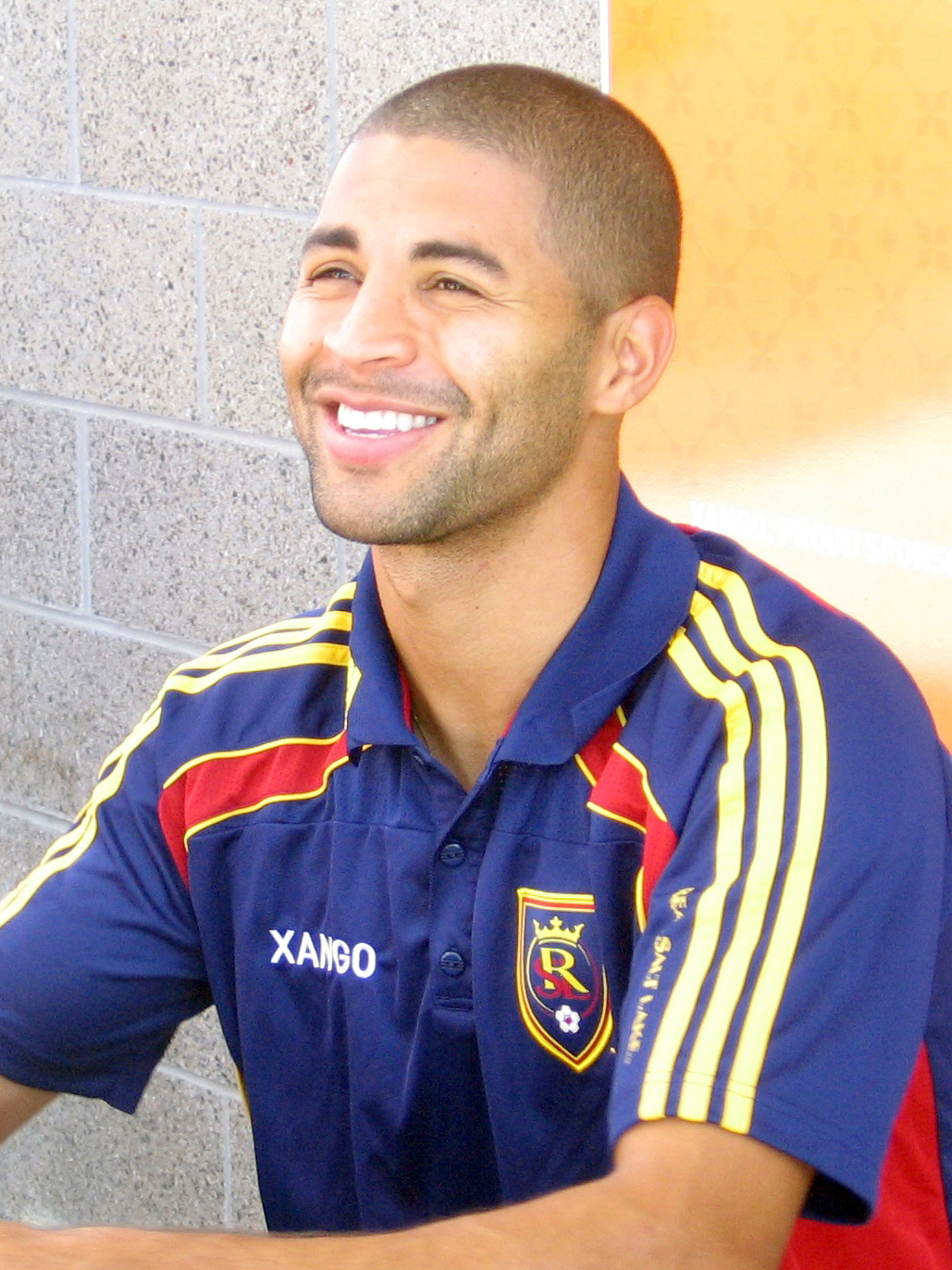
Saborío at a "Meet the Players" event for Real Salt Lake in 2010

Saborío signed with Major League Soccer club Real Salt Lake in March 2010. He made a huge impact in his first season in Salt Lake: RSL boasted the highest-scoring offense in MLS in 2010 (45 goals); Saborío led the way with a team-high 12 tallies. For his efforts, he earned the MLS Newcomer of the Year award. He also starred for the club in the CONCACAF Champions League tournament, scoring eight goals as Real Salt Lake advanced to the championship round.

After a successful first season at the club, Saborío was made Salt Lake's first ever Designated Player, signing a four-year contract with the club on 1 December 2010.

Saborío became the club's all-time leading scorer, and their key target man. As of 5 May 2012, Saborío had scored 38 goals across all competitions, eight of them coming from CONCACAF Champions League play.

On 18 November 2013 Saborío was named FutbolMLS.com's Latino del Año.

Saborío scored a goal in the 52nd minute of the 2013 MLS Cup on 7 December. His goal was equalized by Aurélien Collin in the 76th minute. He later missed his penalty kick when the game went into a penalty kick shoutout, in which Sporting Kansas City won.

=== D.C. United ===
On 16 July 2015, Saborío was traded to D.C. United for Luis Silva. He scored his first goal for United on 26 July 2015, against the Philadelphia Union. On 2 October 2015, Saborío scored a stoppage time winner against New York City FC to clinch United a spot in the 2015 MLS Playoffs.

Saborío re-signed with United on 17 November 2015.

On 14 November 2016, Saborío announced that he was to leave United after two seasons. He played 31 games, scored 10 goals, and contributed 10 assists for D.C. United.

=== Deportivo Saprissa ===
On 10 January 2017, Saborío signed a one-year contract with Deportivo Saprissa. On 9 February 2017, Saborío announced his retirement due to conflicts with Saprissa fans.

=== San Carlos ===
Saborío was a leading figure in San Carlos' double championship: first in the second division, and once in the first division, they won the Torneo de Clausura for the 2018–2019 season.

== International career ==
Saborío was an important player for the Costa Rica national team at numerous levels. He represented the U-23 team at the 2004 Olympics, scoring the qualifying goal that took them there, and subsequently started three of four games for the team, scoring a goal against Portugal.

Saborío made his senior debut for Costa Rica in an October 2002 friendly match against Ecuador and has, as of October 2021, earned a total of 112 caps, scoring 36 goals, placing him third at his country's all-time goalscorers list behind Rolando Fonseca and Paulo Wanchope.

Saborío, better known as Pipe, has been notably recognized for his accomplishments with Deportivo Saprissa, and the high number of goals he scored in a short period. But after a year at the club his Costa Rican coach got a hold of him and he took part in the 2006 FIFA World Cup. He was mostly a substitute for the side, behind Rónald Gómez and former Manchestet City forward Paulo Wanchope. He also scored the first goal ever in the Estadio Nacional de Costa Rica, in the inaugural match against China. Saborío was at the centre of much controversy in the 2011 CONCACAF Gold Cup, criticized heavily for his misses, including two penalty kicks in the quarterfinals against Honduras, and for a training pitch incident where he allegedly kicked a ball at a child who was in the stands.

Saborío scored eight times in Costa Rica's successful 2014 FIFA World Cup qualification campaign, including a hat-trick in a 4–0 away win over Guyana on 12 June 2012, and a further two goals on 16 October in a 7–0 win over the same opponents. On 12 May 2014, Saborío was named to Costa Rica's 30-man preliminary roster for the 2014 FIFA World Cup in Brazil. However, on 29 May, the Costa Rican Football Federation confirmed that Saborío had broken the fifth metatarsal bone in his left foot during a training session with the national team and would subsequently miss the World Cup.

Saborío was in Costa Rica's squad for the 2015 CONCACAF Gold Cup and earned his 100th cap on 11 July at the BBVA Compass Stadium in Houston, assisting Bryan Ruiz's goal in a 1–1 Group B draw with El Salvador; he was the fifth Costa Rican to make one hundred appearances.

== Personal life ==
A son of former Costa Rica international Álvaro Grant MacDonald and Marlene Saborío, Saborío can speak four languages: Portuguese, Spanish, French and English.

Saborío holds a U.S. green card which qualifies him as a domestic player for MLS roster purposes.

== Career statistics ==
=== Club ===
As of 30 July 2021

Appearances and goals by club, season and competition
Club	Season	League	
Club	Season	Apps	Goals
Saprissa	2001–02	24	11
Saprissa	2002–03	36	27
Saprissa	2003–04	37	25
Saprissa	2004–05	21	15
Saprissa	2005–06	31	17
Saprissa	Total	149	95
Sion	2006–07	31	14
Sion	2007–08	34	17
Sion	2008–09	22	5
Sion	Total	87	36
Bristol City (loan)	2009–10	19	2
Real Salt Lake	2010	27	12
Real Salt Lake	2011	23	11
Real Salt Lake	2012	31	17
Real Salt Lake	2013	16	12
Real Salt Lake	2014	16	8
Real Salt Lake	2015	14	3
Real Salt Lake	Total	127	63
D.C. United	2015	12	4
D.C. United	2016	19	6
D.C. United	Total	31	10
Saprissa	2016–17	4	1
A.D. San Carlos	2018–19	48	28
A.D. San Carlos	2019–20	28	13
A.D. San Carlos	2020–21	22	9
A.D. San Carlos	Total	98	50
Alajuelense (loan)	2020–21	18	6
Career total		533	263

=== International goals ===
Scores and results list Costa Rica's goal tally first, score column indicates score after each Saborío goal.

List of international goals scored by Álvaro Saborío
No.	Date	Venue	Opponent	Score	Result	Competition
1	7 September 2003	FIU Stadium, Miami, United States	China	1–0	2–0	Friendly
2	19 November 2003	Estadio Alejandro Morera Soto, Alajuela, Costa Rica	Finland	2–1	2–1	Friendly
3	12 June 2004	Estadio Pedro Marrero, Havana, Cuba	Cuba	2–1	2–2	2006 FIFA World Cup qualification
4	4 September 2005	Estadio Rommel Fernández, Panama City, Panama	Panama	1–0	3–1	2006 FIFA World Cup qualification
5	7 September 2005	Estadio Ricardo Saprissa, Tibás, Costa Rica	Trinidad and Tobago	1–0	2–0	2006 FIFA World Cup qualification
6	9 November 2005	Stade d'Honneur de Dillon, Fort-de-France, Martinique	France	1–0	2–3	Friendly
7	11 February 2006	Rose Bowl, Pasadena, United States	South Korea	1–0	1–0	Friendly
8	2 September 2006	Stade de Genève, Geneva, Switzerland	Austria	1–0	2–2	Friendly
9	2 September 2006	Stade de Genève, Geneva, Switzerland	Austria	2–2	2–2	Friendly
10	24 March 2007	Estadio Ricardo Saprissa, Tibás, Costa Rica	New Zealand	1–0	4–0	Friendly
11	24 March 2007	Estadio Ricardo Saprissa, Tibás, Costa Rica	New Zealand	4–0	4–0	Friendly
12	21 June 2008	Estadio Ricardo Saprissa, Tibás, Costa Rica	Grenada	1–0	3–0	2010 FIFA World Cup qualification
13	20 August 2008	Estadio Ricardo Saprissa, Tibás, Costa Rica	El Salvador	1–0	1–0	2010 FIFA World Cup qualification
14.	3 June 2009	Estadio Ricardo Saprissa, Tibás, Costa Rica	United States	1–0	3–1	2010 FIFA World Cup qualification
15	6 June 2009	Dwight Yorke Stadium, Bacolet, Trinidad and Tobago	Trinidad and Tobago	1–1	3–2	2010 FIFA World Cup qualification
16	27 June 2009	Estadio Ricardo Saprissa, Tibás, Costa Rica	Venezuela	1–0	1–0	Friendly
17	19 July 2009	Cowboys Stadium, Arlington, United States	Guadeloupe	2–0	5–1	2009 CONCACAF Gold Cup
18	19 July 2009	Cowboys Stadium, Arlington, United States	Guadeloupe	4–1	5–1	2009 CONCACAF Gold Cup
19	10 October 2009	Estadio Ricardo Saprissa, Tibás, Costa Rica	Trinidad and Tobago	3–0	4–0	2010 FIFA World Cup qualification
20	10 October 2009	Estadio Ricardo Saprissa, Tibás, Costa Rica	Trinidad and Tobago	4–0	4–0	2010 FIFA World Cup qualification
21	3 September 2010	Estadio Rommel Fernández, Panama City, Panama	Panama	2–2	2–2	Friendly
22	26 March 2011	Estadio Nacional de Costa Rica, San José, Costa Rica	China	1–0	2–2	Friendly
23	5 June 2011	Cowboys Stadium, Arlington, United States	Cuba	2–0	5–0	2011 CONCACAF Gold Cup
24	8 June 2012	Estadio Nacional de Costa Rica, San José, Costa Rica	El Salvador	1–0	2–2	2014 FIFA World Cup qualification
25	12 June 2012	Providence Stadium, Providence, Guyana	Guyana	1–0	4–0	2014 FIFA World Cup qualification
26	12 June 2012	Providence Stadium, Providence, Guyana	Guyana	2–0	4–0	2014 FIFA World Cup qualification
27	12 June 2012	Providence Stadium, Providence, Guyana	Guyana	3–0	4–0	2014 FIFA World Cup qualification
28	16 October 2012	Estadio Nacional de Costa Rica, San José, Costa Rica	Guyana	4–0	7–0	2014 FIFA World Cup qualification
29	16 October 2012	Estadio Nacional de Costa Rica, San José, Costa Rica	Guyana	7–0	7–0	2014 FIFA World Cup qualification
30	6 February 2013	Estadio Rommel Fernández, Panama City, Panama	Panama	1–2	2–2	2014 FIFA World Cup qualification
31	15 October 2013	Estadio Nacional de Costa Rica, San José, Costa Rica	Mexico	2–1	2–1	2014 FIFA World Cup qualification
32	5 March 2014	Estadio Nacional de Costa Rica, San José, Costa Rica	Paraguay	2–0	2–1	Friendly
33	10 October 2014	Sohar Regional Sports Complex, Sohar, Oman	Oman	1–0	4–3	Friendly
34	13 November 2014	Estadio Centenario, Montevideo, Uruguay	Uruguay	1–0	3–3	Friendly
35	31 March 2015	Estadio Rommel Fernández, Panamá City, Panama	Panama	1–2	1–2	Friendly
36	24 June 2019	Red Bull Arena, Harrison, United States	Haiti	1–0	1–2	2019 CONCACAF Gold Cup

== Honours ==
Saprissa

- Liga FPD: 2003–04, Apertura 2005, Clausura 2006
- CONCACAF Champions League: 2005
- Copa Interclubes UNCAF: 2003

Sion

- Swiss Cup: 2009

Real Salt Lake

- Major League Soccer Western Conference Championship: 2013

San Carlos

- Liga FPD: Clausura 2019
- Liga de Ascenso: 2017–18

Alajuelense

- Liga FPD: Apertura 2020

Costa Rica

- Copa Centroamericana: 2013

Individual

- MLS Newcomer of the Year: 2010
- CONCACAF Gold Cup All-Tournament Team: 2009

== See also ==
- List of footballers with 100 or more caps
