= Dipping =

Dipping may refer to:

- Flag dipping, the movement of a flag as a signal
- Sheep dip, a solution of insecticide and fungicide for sheep
- Plunge dip, a device for bathing livestock in pesticide
- Dip (exercise)
- Dip (dance move)
- Dipping tobacco, a smokeless tobacco product
- A brief session of swimming, as in skinny dipping
- An old term for baptism
- Bright dipping, a process of removing oxides from non-ferrous metals in chrome plating
- Treating a coin in a dilute acid solution as a way to clean it
- Dipping tone

== See also ==
- Dip (disambiguation)
