= Karthika =

Karthika or Kartika may refer to:

== Entertainment ==
- Kartika (album), a 2003 album by The Eternal
- Karthika (film), Indian Malayalam film in 1968
- Kartika (TV series), a Disney India sitcom

== People ==
- Karthika (name), including a list of persons with the name
- Karthika (Malayalam actress)
- Kartika (model) (born 1977), a Brazilian model

== Other ==
- Kartika (knife), used in Buddhist ritual
- Kartika (month), in the Hindu calendar or Karthikai in the Tamil calendar
- Kartika I (rocket), the first Indonesian sounding rocket
- Kartika Airlines, Indonesia
- Karthika Deepam, regional Indian festival, related to Diwali
  - Karthika Deepam (disambiguation)

== See also ==
- Karthik (disambiguation)
- Karthikeyan
