= Toofan =

Toofan (lit. 'typhoon' from the Greek storm giant Typhon) may refer to:

- Toofan (1976 film), a Pakistani Punjabi film
- Toofan (1989 film), Indian Hindi-language film directed by Ketan Desai starring Amitabh Bachchan
- Toofan (2002 film), Pakistani Urdu-language film directed by Parvez Rana starring Shaan Shahid
- Toofan (2010 film), Indian Hindi-language film starring Dileep
- Toofan (2012 film), an Indian Kannada-language romantic drama film
- Toofan (2024 film), Bangladeshi film directed by Raihan Rafi starring Shakib Khan
- Thoofan, also known as Zanjeer in Hindi, Indian Telugu-language film directed by Apoorva Lakhia starring Ram Charan
- Toofaan, 2021 Indian Hindi-language boxing film directed by Rakeysh Omprakash Mehra starring Farhan Akhtar
- Toofan Harirod FC, Afghan football club
- Toofan (MRAP), an Iranian armored vehicle
- Toofan, a fictional character from the 1976 Indian film Fakira, played by Danny Denzongpa
- Toofan Singh (1971–1990), militant in Punjab, India
  - Toofan Singh (film), 2017 Indian Punjabi-language biographical film based on his life
  - Toofan (singer) Iranian singer (1946-2012)

== See also ==
- Tufan (disambiguation)
- Tufani (disambiguation)
- Typhoon (disambiguation)
- Diya Aur Toofan (disambiguation)
- Tufang (disambiguation)
