= Tufan (name) =

Tufan is a masculine Turkish given name and surname. In Turkish it means "violent rainstorm" or "flood". Notable people with the name include:

== Given name ==
- Tufan Bahadur, Mughal soldier stationed in Bengal
- Tufan Erhürman (born 1970), Turkish Cypriot academic, lawyer, diplomat, and politician
- Tufan Ersöz, Turkish basketball player
- Tufan Esin, Turkish footballer
- Semih Tufan Gülaltay, founder of the militant Turkish Revenge Brigade
- Tufan Kelleci, Turkish footballer
- Tufan Tosunoğlu, Turkish footballer
- Tufan, Iranian singer 1946-2012

== Surname ==
- Ozan Tufan, Turkish footballer

== See also ==
- Tufan (disambiguation)
