= Depth =

Depth(s) may refer to:

== Science and mathematics ==
- Depth (ring theory), an important invariant of rings and modules in commutative and homological algebra
- Depth in a well, the measurement between two points in an oil well
- Color depth (or "number of bits" or "bit depth"), in computer graphics
- Market depth, in financial markets, the size of an order needed to move the market a given amount
- Moulded depth, a nautical measurement
- Sequence depth, or coverage, in genetic sequencing
- Depth (coordinate), a type of vertical distance
- Tree depth

== Art and entertainment ==
- Depth (video game), an asymmetrical multiplayer video game for Microsoft Windows
- Depths (novel), a 2004 novel by Henning Mankell
- Depths (Oceano album), 2009
- Depths (Windy & Carl album), 1998
- Depth (EP), a 2024 EP by Yuta
- "Depths" (Law & Order: Criminal Intent), an episode of Law & Order: Criminal Intent
- Depth, the Japanese title for the PlayStation game released in Europe under the name Fluid
- Depths of Wikipedia, social media account dedicated to interesting or unusual Wikipedia content

== See also ==
- Altitude, height, and depth (ISO definitions)
- Altitude
- Depth charge (disambiguation)
- Depth perception, the visual ability to perceive the world in three dimensions (3D)
- Fluid pressure
- Plumb-bob
- Sea level
- Deep (disambiguation)
