= DIPA =

DIPA may refer to:

- Dipa (given name)
- Dirección de Investigación de Políticas Antidemocráticas, Argentine political police of Juan Carlos Onganía's dictatorship, active in the 1969 Cordobazo uprising
- Democratic Alignment (DiPa), a political party in Cyprus
- Diisopropylamine, a chemical compound
- 2,6-Diisopropylaniline, a chemical compound
- Dauria International Protected Area
- Double India Pale Ale

== See also ==
- Deepa (disambiguation)
- Deepam (disambiguation)
- Diya (disambiguation)
- Deepika (disambiguation)
- Deep (disambiguation)
