= DIPS =

DIPS may refer to:

- Defense independent pitching statistics (baseball)
- Dip (exercise)
- Division of International Protection Services, under the United Nations High Commissioner for Refugees
- Washington Diplomats, a defunct professional soccer team
- Nickname of Bollywood actress, Deepika Padukone
- DIPS (Digital Image Processing with Sound)
- Dips (TV series), Swedish comedy series

== See also ==
- DIP (disambiguation)
