= Al Día =

Al Dia may refer to:

- Al Día (Costa Rica), a Costa Rican newspaper
- Al Día (Guatemala), a Guatemalan newspaper
- Al Día (Dallas), a Spanish-language U.S. newspaper in the Dallas-Fort Worth region
- Al Día (Philadelphia), a Spanish-language U.S. newspaper in the Philadelphia region

== See also ==
- El Día (disambiguation)
- Dia (disambiguation)
