= Deepam =

Deepam may refer to:

- Karthikai Deepam, post-Diwali Hindu "Festival of Lights" in southern India
- Diya (lamp), a type of oil lamp
- Deepam TV, a free-to-air Indian satellite television channel

== Films ==
- Amara Deepam (1956 film), a 1956 Indian Tamil-language film
- Amara Deepam (1977 film), a 1977 Indian Telugu-language film
- Dheepam, a 1977 Tamil-language film
- Deepam (film), a 1980 Indian Malayalam-language film
- Karthika Deepam (film), a 1979 Indian Telugu-language film

== See also ==
- Deepa (disambiguation)
- DIPA (disambiguation)
- Diya (disambiguation)
- Deepika (disambiguation)
- Deep (disambiguation)
- Deepavali (disambiguation)
- Karthika Deepam (disambiguation)
