= Dia (name) =

Dia is surname and given name.

== Persons ==
=== Surname ===
- Ali Dia (born 1965), Senegalese footballer
- Amadou Dia Ba (born 1958), former Senegalese athlete
- Boulaye Dia (born 1996), Senegalese footballer
- Fabé Dia (born 1977), French-Italian athlete
- Issiar Dia (born 1987), French footballer
- Mamadou Dia (1910–2009), the first Prime Minister of Senegal
- Mamadou Chérif Dia (born 1984), Senegalese athlete
- Modou Dia (born 1950), Senegalese politician
- Mohamed Dia (born 1973), fashion creator
- Omar Dia (born 1955), Senegalese basketball player
- Pape Cire Dia (born 1980), Senegalese footballer
- Tidiane Dia (born 1985), Senegalese football player
- Yero Dia (born 1982), French football player

=== Given name ===
- Dia Abdul Zahra Kadim (1970–2007), Iraqi cult leader
- Dia al-Azzawi (born 1939), Iraqi artist
- Dia Bell (born 2007), American football player; son of Raja Bell
- Dia Cha (born 1962), Hmong American author and professor
- Dia Chakravarty (born 1984), British political activist
- Dia Evtimova (born 1987), Bulgarian tennis player
- Dia Forrester (born ?), former Attorney General of Grenada
- Dia Frampton (born 1987), lead singer of the American band, Meg & Dia
- Dia Kurosawa, fictional character from the media-mix project Love Live! Sunshine!!
- Dia Mirza (born 1981), Indian model and actress
- Dia Nader de El-Andari (born 1950), Lebanese Venezuelan ambassador
- Dia Saba (born 1992), Israeli soccer player
- Dia Sokol Savage (born 1976), American film and television producer and director
