= Deepika =

Female given name

- Gender: Female
- Language: Malayalam, Hindi, Tamil, Konkani, Kannada

Origin
- Meaning: "fans" "light"
- Region of origin: India and Sri Lanka

Other names
- Related names: Deepali, Deeyah, Dipali, Dipika

Deepika (ദീപിക, दीपिका) is a Hindu/Sanskrit Indian feminine given name, which means "lantern" and "light".

== Notable people named Deepika ==
- Deepika Chikhalia (born 1965), Indian actress and politician
- Deepika Joshi-Shah (1976–2012), Indian actress and singer
- Deepika Kamaiah (born 1984), Indian actress and model
- Deepika Kumari (born 1994), Indian archer
- Deepika Kumari (field hockey) (born 2003), Indian field hockey player
- Deepika Kurup (born 1998), Indian inventor, scientist and clean water advocate
- Deepika Padukone (born 1986), Indian actress and model
- Deepika Rasangika (born 1983), Sri Lankan cricketer
- Deepika Singh (born 1989), Indian actress

== Notable people named Dipika ==
- Dipika Murthy (born 1980), Indian hockey player
- Dipika Pallikal (born 1991), Indian squash player
- Dipika Kakar (born 1986), Indian TV actress

== Notable people named Deeyah ==
- Deeyah Khan (born 1977), Norwegian film director, music producer, composer, and human rights defender

== Fictional characters ==
- Deepika, from the Mohammad Hossain Jemy's 2011 film Bajaw Biyer Bajna

== See also ==
- Deepali (disambiguation)
