= SS Hawkinge =

A number of steamships were named Hawkinge, including:

- SS Hawkinge (1924), a British cargo ship torpedoed and sunk in 1941
- SS Hawkinge (1943), a British cargo ship in service 1946–51
