= Tufan =

Tufan may refer to:

- Tufan (name), a masculine Turkish given name and surname
- Tibet, called Tufan or Tubo in Chinese historical texts
  - The Tibetan Empire (618–842)
- Tufan, Iran, a village in Razavi Khorasan Province
- Tufan Ganj, town in West Bengal, India

== See also ==
- Tufani (disambiguation)
- Toofan (disambiguation)
- Tufang (disambiguation)
