= Deep =

Deep may refer to:

== People ==
- Deep (given name)
- Deep (rapper), Punjabi rapper from Houston, Texas
- Ravi Deep (born 1954), Indian theatre and television director, writer and actor

== Arts and entertainment ==
=== Films ===
- Deep (2005 film)
- Deep (2014 film)
- Deep (2017 film)
- Deep (2021 film), a Thai mystery film

=== Music ===
==== Albums ====
- Deep (Junior Mance album), 1980
- Deep (Peter Murphy album), 1989
- Deep (Silent Running album), 1989
- Deep (Niacin album), 2000
- Deep – Teenagers from Outer Space, by Balzac, 1997
- Deep, by The Spooky Men's Chorale, 2009

==== Songs ====
- "Deep" (East 17 song), 1993
- "Deep" (Pearl Jam song), 1991
- "Deep" (Collide song), 1997
- "Deep" (Nine Inch Nails song), 2001
- "Deep", by Big Sean on Dark Sky Paradise, 2015
- "Deep", by Blackstreet on Level II, 2003
- "Deep", by Kehlani on Crash, 2024
- "Deep", by Nickelback on The State, 1998
- "Deep", by Hyo from the EP of the same name, 2022

== Other uses ==
- Deep (mixed martial arts), a Japanese mixed martial arts promotion and sanctioning organisation
- Deep Foods, an American manufacturer of Indian foods
- Tehom, a Biblical term translated as "deep" in Genesis 1:2
- Connecticut Department of Energy and Environmental Protection
- Defense Education Enhancement Program, a multinational military education program contributed to by the Partnership for Peace Consortium of Defense Academies and Security Studies Institutes
- Deep Robotics, a Chinese robotics company

== See also ==
- The Deep (disambiguation)
- Deeper (disambiguation)
- Depth (disambiguation)
- Deepa (disambiguation)
- Deepam (disambiguation)
- DIPA (disambiguation)
- Deepika (disambiguation)
- Dip (disambiguation)
