= Karthik =

Karthik or Kartik may refer to:

== People with the given name ==
=== Kartik ===
- Kartik Aaryan (born 1990), Indian actor
- Kartik Chandran, American environmental engineer
- Kartik Jeshwant (born 1964), Indian cricketer
- Kartik Joshi (born 1995), Indian cricketer
- Kartik Oraon (1924-1981), Indian politician and Adivasi Member of Parliament
- Kartik Shetty (born 1987), Indian actor and director
- Kartik Tyagi (born 2000), Indian cricketer

=== Karthik ===
- Karthik (actor) (born 1960), Indian Tamil actor known as Navarasa Nayagan
- Karthik (singer) (born 1980), Indian singer
- Karthik Ghattamneni, Indian cinematographer and film director in Telugu cinema
- Karthik Jayaram, Indian actor in Kannada films
- Karthik Netha, Indian poet and lyricist
- Karthik Raj, Indian actor who works in Tamil film and television
- Karthik Raja (born 1973), Indian composer
- Karthik Sarma (born 1974/1975), Indian-American billionaire hedge fund manager
- Karthik Subbaraj, Indian film director, writer and producer

== People with the surname ==
=== Kartik ===
- Kalpana Kartik (born 1931), Hindi film actress
- Murali Kartik (born 1976), Indian cricketer

=== Karthik ===
- Arun Karthik (born 1986), Indian cricketer
- Avishek Karthik, Indian film actor in Tamil films
- Dhanish Karthik (born 1989), Indian actor
- Dinesh Karthik (born 1985), Indian cricketer
- Dipika Pallikal Karthik (born 1991), Indian squash player
- Gautham Karthik (born 1989), Indian Tamil film actor
- Sabari Karthik (born 1990), Indian karate player
- Sai Karthik, or Sai Kartheek, Indian film score composer and music director
- T. M. Karthik, Indian stage and film actor

== Other ==
- Kartik (month), a month in the Indian National, Tamil and Bengali calendars
- Kartik (Nepali calendar), the seventh month in the Nepali calendar
- Kartik (Gemma Doyle Trilogy), a character in a trilogy of fantasy novels
- Kartik BLT, Indian armoured vehicle-launched bridge (AVLB)

== See also ==
- Kartikeya, the Hindu god of warfare
- Karthikeya (film), 2014 Indian Telugu-language film by Chandoo Mondeti
- Karlik (disambiguation)
- Karthick Naren, Indian filmmaker
- Karthick Ramakrishnan, Indian-American political scientist
- Karthick Singa, Indian actor
- Karthi (born 1977), Indian film actor who works primarily in Tamil cinema
- Karthika (disambiguation)
- Karthikeyan
