= Álvaro Grant =

Costa Rican footballer and manager (born 1938)

Personal information
- Full name: Álvaro Grant MacDonald
- Date of birth: 3 February 1938 (age 88)
- Place of birth: San José, Costa Rica
- Position: Defender

Youth career
- 1953: Saprissa
- 1955: Guadalupe

Senior career*
Years	Team	Apps	(Gls)
1956–1973	Herediano	298	

International career
1959–1969	Costa Rica	46	(1)

Managerial career
- 1973–1975: Herediano (assistant)
- 1978: San Carlos
- 1984: Alajuelense
- 1985: Costa Rica
- 1993: Costa Rica
- 1994–1995: Herediano
- 1998: Goicoechea
- * Club domestic league appearances and goals

Álvaro Grant MacDonald (born 3 February 1938) is a Costa Rican former football player and manager.

== Club career ==
Grant played for Saprissa and Guadalupe at youth and junior level but made his senior debut for Herediano in 1956 and remained with the club until his retirement in July 1973. He totalled 298 league games for the Rojiamarillos and 49 cup games.

== International career ==
Grant was capped by Costa Rica, playing 46 games and scoring 1 goal. He represented his country in 13 FIFA World Cup qualification matches. He also played at the inaugural 1963 CONCACAF Championship. Grant was named by both Radio Monumental and Al Dia newspaper in their squad of the best players of Costa Rica in the 20th century.

== Managerial career ==
After retiring, Grant managed Alajuelense, Herediano and the Costa Rica national football team as well as Puntarenas and Limonense. In October 1998 he took the reins at Goicoechea.

== Personal life ==
Grant was born to Alia Grant, who died when he was young, and had five brothers. He is married to Marla Vega Alfaro but Álvaro and Marlene Saborío are the parents of Costa Rica international forward Álvaro Saborío.
