= Tidiane (given name) =

Tidiane is a masculine given name. Notable people with the name include:

- Ahmed Tidiane Souaré (born 1951), Guinean politician
- Amadou Tidiane Tall (born 1975), Burkinabé footballer
- Cheick Tidiane Seck (born 1953), Malian musician
- Cheikh Tidiane Gadio (born 1956), Senegalese diplomat
- Sékou Tidiane Souare (born 1983), Ivorian footballer
- Tidiane Devernois (born 2007), French footballer
- Tidiane Dia (born 1985), Senegalese footballer
- Tidiane N'Diaye (1950–2025), Franco-Senegalese anthropologist, economist, and writer
- Tidiane Sane (born 1985), Senegalese footballer
