= Taifun =

Taifun may refer to:

== Military and transportation ==
- Taifun 9M15, a Soviet prototype anti-tank missile
- Taifun, German WWII Thermobaric weapon system
- Taifun (rocket), German anti-aircraft rocket system
- Taifun (radar), Soviet system used in Sukhoi Su-15
- Messerschmidt Taifun, a 1930s German aircraft (Bf 108)
- Valentin Taifun, 1980s sailplane
- Soviet trawler Taifun, also known as USS Penetrate (AM-271)
- Taifun, 8m sailing boat in which Norway won gold in the 1912 Olympics
- Wings of Change Taifun, an Austrian paraglider design

== Film and music ==
- Typhoon (1933 film), Original title Taifun

== See also ==
- Typhoon (disambiguation)
