= Deepali =

- Gender: Female
- Language: Hindi

Origin
- Meaning: "chain of lamps" "joy" "someone who brings happiness into one's life" "row of lamps"
- Region of origin: India

Other names
- Related names: Deepika, Deeyah, Dipali, Dipika

Deepali (Hindi : दीपाली) is a Hindu/Sanskrit Indian feminine given name, which means "joy", "happiness into one's life"

== Notable people named Deepali ==
- Deepali Deshpande (born 1969), Indian sport shooter
- Deepali Kishore (born 1989), Indian singer
- Deepali Pansare (born 1984), Indian actress
- Deepali (Kannada actress)
- Deepali Pant Joshi (born 1957), Indian banker, businesswoman and doctor

== Notable people named Dipali ==
- Dipali Barthakur (1941–2018), Indian singer
- Dipali Cunningham (born 1958), Australian ultramarathon woman runner

== Others ==
- Dipali Kumari, a 2008 TV Shortland Street fictional character
