= Karthikeyan =

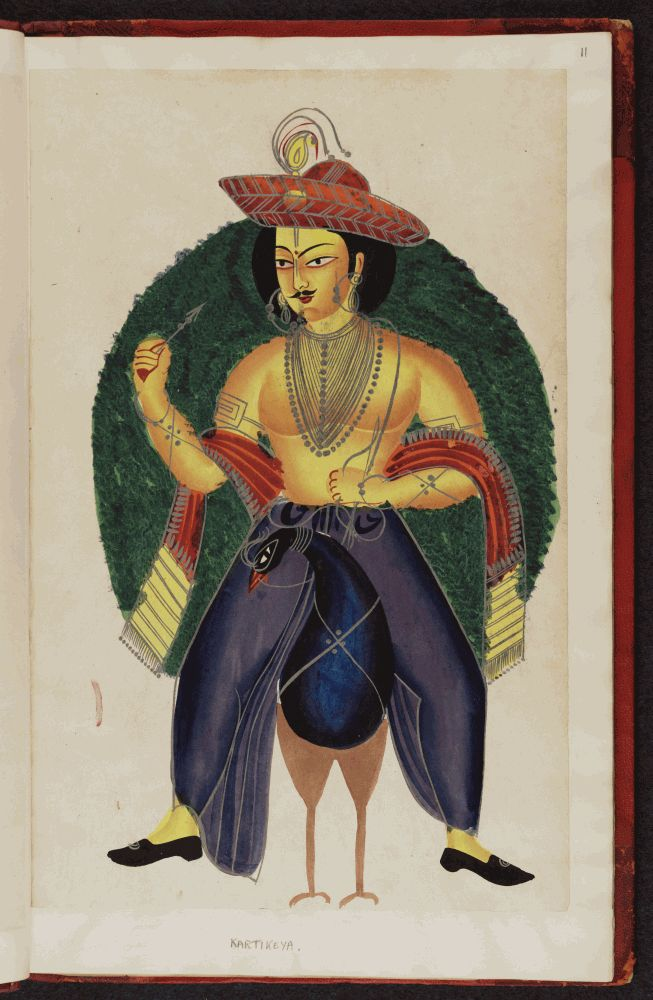
- Kartikeya mounted on a peacock. Indian painting from 1875.
- Gender: Male

Origin
- Region of origin: India

Other names
- Related names: Karthika, Karthikeyan, Karthik, Murugan, Aarumugan, Kartika

Karthikeyan (in short Karthikeya, Karthik, Kartik) is an Indian masculine given name derived from the Lord Kartikeya.

== People ==
- D. R. Karthikeyan, an Indian Police Service officer
- G. Karthikeyan, an Indian politician and the speaker of the Kerala Legislative Assembly
- M. L. R. Karthikeyan, an Indian playback singer
- Murali Karthikeyan, an Indian chess Grandmaster
- Narain Karthikeyan, the first Formula One motor racing driver from India
- P. S. Karthikeyan, an Indian politician who was a member of the Kerala Legislative Assembly
- Sivakarthikeyan, an Indian film actor, television anchor, and stand-up comedian of Tamil Nadu
- Sujata R. Karthikeyan, an IAS officer and wife of V. K. Pandian

== See also ==
- Karthik (disambiguation)
- Karthika (disambiguation)
- Kartik (month)
