= Slutdrop =

Type of dance

Slutdrop is a dance move. The move involves squatting as quickly and as low as possible and immediately popping back up. A hand is often put straight up to steady oneself, and the move is often performed whilst grinding a dance partner that the dropper is trying to impress. The term is a compound word combining the words "slut" and "drop", reflecting the sexual nature of the move and the act of dropping one's body lower to the ground. The move's popularity is attributed to its usage by Christina Aguilera in her music video for "Dirrty" in 2002. Other pop stars who have performed the move include the Pussycat Dolls (Don't Cha from 2005), Beyoncé and Britney Spears. As the move is essentially a type of squat exercise, doing it repeatedly is reported to lead to an increase in muscle strength in the thighs.

Sophie Wilkinson of The Guardian described naming the dance move a slutdrop an example of the word 'slut' being reclaimed by women, and also reclaiming the term 'slutdrop' from its previous meaning. Wilkinson states that slutdropping brings women together on the dance floor and called it a "true signifier of feminine camaraderie". In an article entitled "'Slut-Dropping' to Either Save or Ruin Feminism", Kat Stoefell from the magazine New York was skeptical of Wilkinson's assessment.

The term has also been attributed to stars from the reality television show Geordie Shore, and the move has also been called "Geordie Shore slut drop". Geordie Shore stars including Vicky Pattison and Sophie Kasaei explained the meaning of the term in an interview in 2011, and it is said to be Kasaei's signature move.

An alternative use of "slutdrop" that predates naming the dance move was using the term to describe a practice involving offering an intoxicated woman a lift home, taking her as far as possible in the opposite direction to where she wanted to go before ejecting her from the vehicle.

== See also ==
- Dip (dance move)
