= El Día =

El Día may refer to:

- El Día (La Plata), a newspaper published in La Plata, Argentina since 1884
- El Día (Canary Islands), a newspaper published in the Canary Islands, Spain since 1910
- El Día (Houston), a newspaper published in Houston, Texas from 1982 to 2009
- El Día (Chile), a newspaper published in La Serena, Chile serving the Coquimbo Region
- El Día (Uruguay), a newspaper published in Uruguay from 1886 to 1993
- El Nuevo Día, a Puerto Rican newspaper that was called El Día from 1911 to 1970

== See also ==
- Al Día (disambiguation)
- Dia (disambiguation)
