= Tufang =

Tufang may refer to:

- Taqanak, city in Chaharmahal and Bakhtiari Province, Iran
- Tufang, Changting County (涂坊镇), town in Changting County, Fujian, China
- Tufang (film), a 2023 Indian film
- Tufang (state), a Shang dynasty state active during the 13th Century BCE.

== See also ==
- Tufan (disambiguation)
- Toofan (disambiguation)
