= Diaa =

Diaa (Arabic: ضياء) is an Arabic male given name.

Notable people with this name include:

- Ahmed Diaa Eddine (1912–1976), Egyptian film director
- Diaa al-Din Dawoud (1926–2011), Egyptian politician
- Diaa Raofat (born 1988), Egyptian footballer
- Diaa Rashwan (born 1960), Egyptian journalist
- Karim Diaa Eddine, Egyptian director
- Diaa al-Awady, Egyptian physician
- Diaa Jubaili, Iraqi novelist
- Diaa Eddine Mechid, Algerian footballer

== See also ==
- DIAA, Delaware Interscholastic Athletic Association
- Diya (disambiguation)
