= Deep (given name) =

Deep is a given name and nickname/hypocorism which may refer to:

- Deep Dasgupta (born 1977), Indian cricketer
- Deep Dhillon (born 1956), Indian film actor
- Deep Joshi (born 1947), Indian social worker and activist
- Deep Ng (born 1983), Hong Kong singer-songwriter and actor
- Deep Roy (born 1957), Kenyan-born dwarf actor born Mohinder Purba
- Deep Saini (born 1954), Canadian plant physiologist and a vice president of the University of Toronto
- Deep Sandhu, Canadian politician
- Deep Sengupta (born 1988), Indian chess grandmaster

== See also ==
- Deepu (disambiguation)
