= Karthika Deepam (disambiguation) =

Karthika Deepam or Karthigai Deepam is a Hindu festival of lights in southern India, related to Diwali. It may also refer to:

- Karthika Deepam (film), a 1979 Indian Telugu-language film
- Karthika Deepam (Telugu TV series), a 2017 Indian Telugu-language TV series
- Karthika Deepam (Malayalam TV series), a 2020 Indian Malayalam-language TV series
- Karthigai Deepam (film), a 1965 Indian Tamil-language film
- Karthigai Deepam (TV series), a 2022 Indian Tamil-language TV series

== See also ==
- Karthika (disambiguation)
- Deepam (disambiguation)
- Deepavali (disambiguation)
- Festival of Lights (disambiguation)
