= Bryan Ruiz =

Costa Rican football player (born 1985)

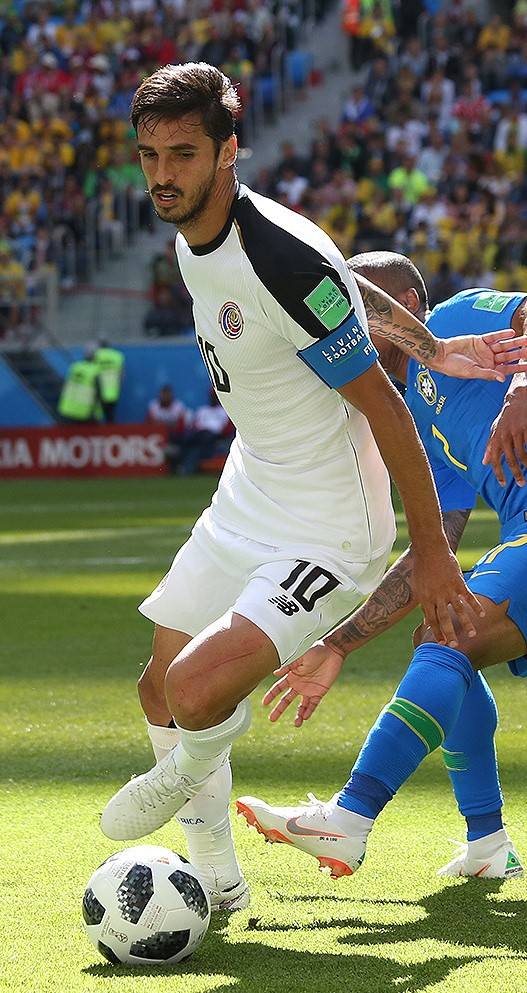
- Ruiz with Costa Rica at the 2018 FIFA World Cup

Personal information
- Full name: Bryan Jafet Ruiz González
- Date of birth: 18 August 1985 (age 41)
- Place of birth: San José, Costa Rica
- Height: 1.87 m (6 ft 2 in)
- Position: Attacking midfielder

Team information
- Current team: Costa Rica (head coach)

Senior career*
Years	Team	Apps	(Gls)
2003–2006	Alajuelense	86	(24)
2006–2009	Gent	79	(26)
2009–2011	Twente	65	(35)
2011–2015	Fulham	97	(12)
2014	→ PSV (loan)	14	(5)
2015–2018	Sporting CP	86	(12)
2018–2020	Santos	12	(0)
2020–2022	Alajuelense	63	(7)
Total		502	(121)

International career
2005–2022	Costa Rica	147	(29)

Managerial career
- 2026: Costa Rica (caretaker)
- 2026–: Costa Rica
- * Club domestic league appearances and goals

Bryan Jafet Ruiz González (Spanish pronunciation: [ˈbɾaʝan ˈrwis]; born 18 August 1985) is a Costa Rican professional football manager and former player who is currently head coach of the Costa Rica national team.

A left-footed attacking midfielder, he also played as a second striker. Ruiz is the only Central American footballer to have played in the UEFA Champions League, the UEFA Europa League, and the CONMEBOL Copa Libertadores.

== Club career ==
=== Alajuelense ===
Ruiz began his professional career at 18, making his debut for Alajuelense on 30 November 2003 against Pérez Zeledón, in Costa Rica's top division. He formed a trio with two strikers, Rolando Fonseca and Froylán Ledezma, with whom he built a reputation as a goalscorer and a play maker.

Ruiz scored his first goal on 23 December 2003 against Ramonense, netting twice against Fernando Patterson. In Alajuelense, he was nicknamed La comadreja (The weasel), for his quick and agile movements on the field. He was a part of the team that won both the 2004 CONCACAF Champions' Cup and the 2005 UNCAF Interclub Cup.

=== Gent ===
In the summer of 2006, Ruiz was signed by Gent in a four-year deal along with Alajuelense teammate Roy Myrie, as well as Randall Azofeifa from rivals Saprissa. He scored his first hat-trick playing on 8 December 2007 against Lokeren. In that season in the Belgian League, he was the captain and top scorer for the team.

=== Twente ===
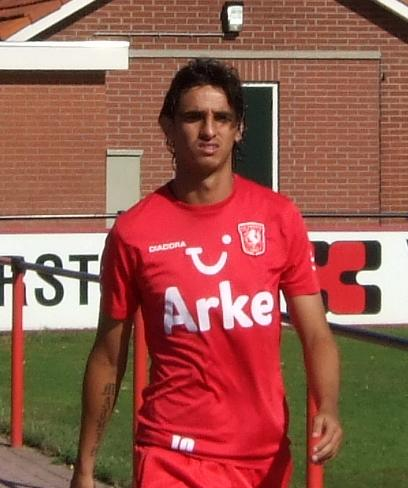
Ruiz with FC Twente in 2010

On 15 July 2009, the Dutch club FC Twente announced that they had signed Ruiz for a fee of around €5 million, and agreed to receive a percentage of a subsequent transfer. He signed a four-year deal with the Eredivisie side.

Ruiz made his debut for the new club by scoring the second goal of the match, with an assist from another newcomer, Miroslav Stoch, in an away defeat of Sparta Rotterdam. His goal against NAC Breda on 12 December 2009 marked the tenth consecutive match in which he had scored. On 27 March 2010, Ruiz made one of the quickest hat-tricks ever against Sparta, with goals in the 46th, 49th and 50th minutes.

On 2 May 2010, FC Twente were crowned champions of Eredivisie for the first time in their history, with a 2–0 win at NAC Breda; Ruiz scored the first goal of the match during the 23rd minute of play. He finished the season as top scorer for Twente with 24 goals in Eredivisie play.

In August 2011, Ruiz was being watched by scouts from Arsenal and Tottenham Hotspur; however, on 18 August 2011 Ruiz claimed that Fulham was in talks with him. He stated to a local source "Fulham is a serious option for me. "That is also a Premier League side and it is a fantastic league. "Fulham already contacted my agent. If Fulham does become serious, we will definitely talk."

=== Fulham ===
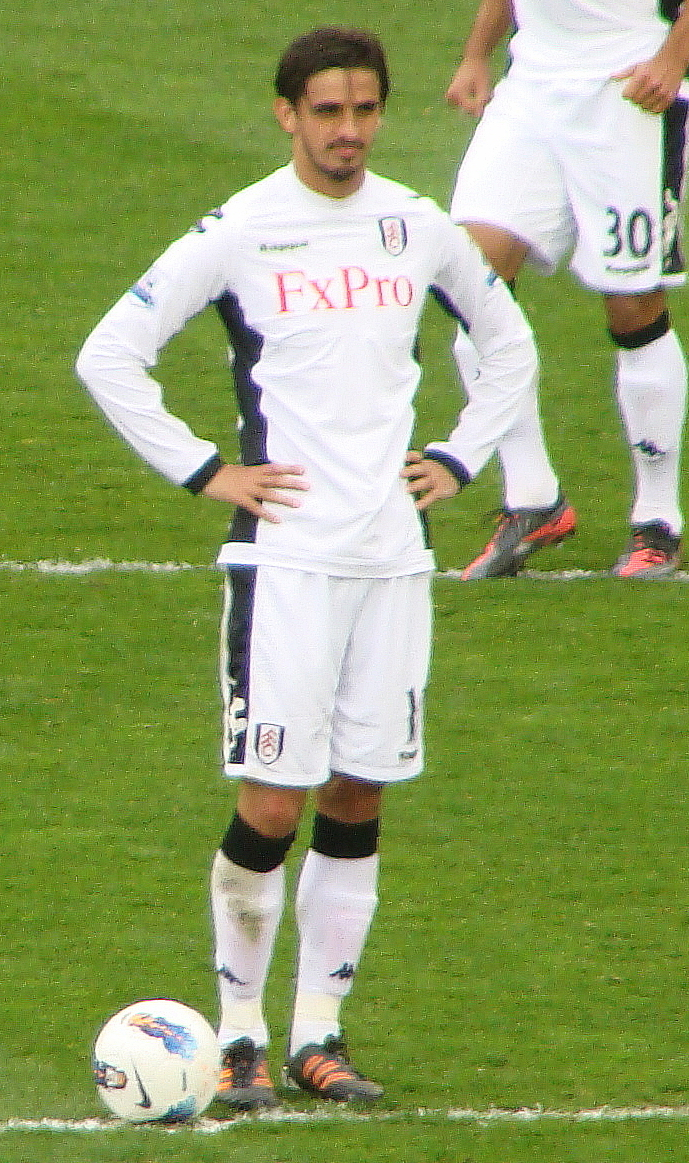
Ruiz playing for Fulham in 2012

On 31 August 2011, the last day of the Premier League summer transfer window, Fulham announced signing Ruiz for an undisclosed fee. His début was on Sunday, 11 September 2011 at home to Blackburn Rovers and he scored his first goal for Fulham in a 3–1 home defeat against Everton on 23 October 2011.

In the fixture against Bolton at the Reebok Stadium on 7 April 2012, Ruiz broke a bone in his foot, leading to a stretcher taking him off and him needing an operation, which sidelined him for 10 weeks.

On 18 August 2012, Ruiz started Fulham's first Premier League game of the season, a 5–0 win against Norwich and assisted Mladen Petrić in scoring his second goal in his debut match. He finished the 2012–13 season making 31 first-team appearances and scoring five goals.

==== PSV Eindhoven (loan) ====
Ruiz joined Eredivisie club PSV Eindhoven on 15 January 2014, on loan until the end of the season.

He made his debut on 19 January 2014 in a 1–0 loss to Ajax and scored his first goal for the club on 14 February with a 63rd-minute winner against Heracles Almelo.

=== Sporting CP ===
On 7 July 2015, Ruiz joined Sporting CP on a three-year contract. He made his debut for the club in the 2015 Supertaça match against Lisbon rivals S.L. Benfica, which Sporting won 1–0.

On 1 October 2015, Ruiz scored his first goal for Sporting against Beşiktaş in the group stage of the UEFA Europa League. His first goal in the Primeira Liga came in a 3–0 Lisbon derby defeat of Benfica at the Estádio da Luz on 25 October. In another derby, on 5 March 2016, he missed an open goal, and Benfica won the match 1–0 at Estádio José Alvalade, knocking out Sporting to second place in the league.

=== Santos ===
On 11 July 2018, free agent Ruiz signed a two-and-a-half-year contract with Santos FC. He made his debut for the club on 8 August, replacing Diego Pituca at half-time in a 1–1 away draw against Ceará.

After only 12 league matches during his first season, Ruiz failed to appear a single minute during his second, under Jorge Sampaoli. On 13 July 2020, after again failing to play under Jesualdo Ferreira, he terminated his contract with the club after alleging "wage breaches and moral damage".

=== Return to Alajuelense ===
On 23 July 2020, Ruiz announced his return to Alajuelense. In December 2022, he officially retired from the professional game, and marked the occasion by participating in a friendly between Alajuelense and his former club Twente.

== International career ==
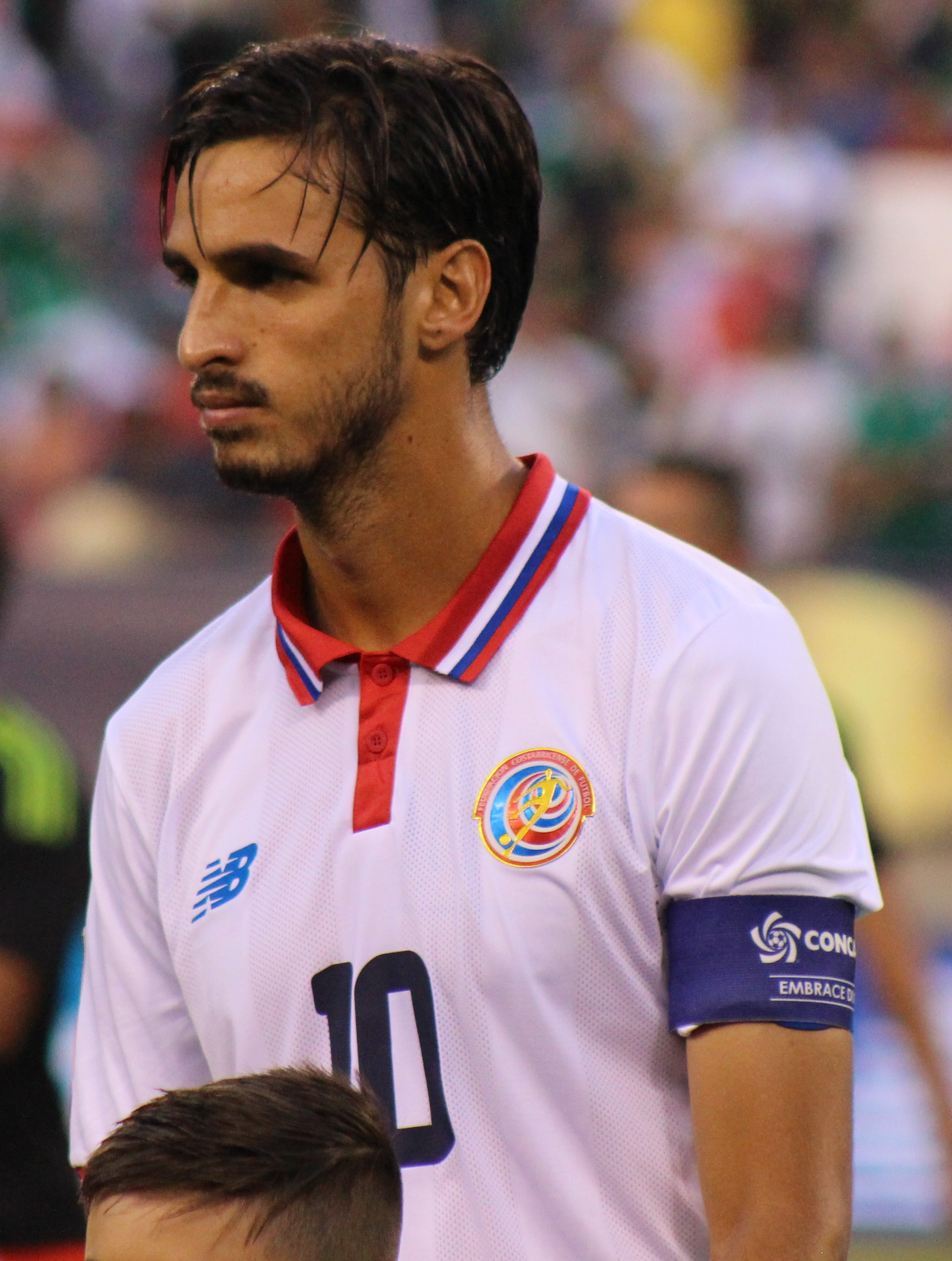
Ruiz was formerly the captain for the Costa Rica national team.

Ruiz made his debut for Costa Rica against China on 19 June 2005.

He has represented the Ticos at the 2005, 2011 and 2015 CONCACAF Gold Cups, captaining the team at the latter tournament. His first international goal came against Honduras in the 2005 tournament.

Ruiz scored six times during the 2010 FIFA World Cup qualification campaign, as Costa Rica was knocked out by Uruguay in the intercontinental play-off. In the 2014 qualifiers, he scored three goals to lead the team to the tournament finals in Brazil.

In June 2014, Ruiz was named in Costa Rica's squad for the 2014 FIFA World Cup. In the team's opening match, he captained Los Ticos to a 3–1 defeat of Uruguay in Fortaleza. On 20 June, Ruiz scored the only goal as Costa Rica upset four-time champions Italy 1–0 to qualify for the round of 16, while also confirming England's elimination; Ruiz played the entire match as Costa Rica went unbeaten in the group stage after a 0–0 draw with England in their final game.

In the round of 16 match against Greece, Ruiz scored the opening goal in a 1–1 draw after extra time, before successfully converting his kick as Costa Rica prevailed 5–3 in the penalty shootout. At the quarter-final stage, Ruiz was one of two Costa Ricans to have their kicks saved by Tim Krul in a 4–3 penalty shootout loss to the Netherlands.

In May 2018, he was named in Costa Rica's 23-man squad for the 2018 FIFA World Cup in Russia. In the last group-stage match against Switzerland, he scored a last-minute equalizing goal from a penalty spot in 2–2 draw; however, the goal was credited as an own goal by Swiss goalkeeper Yann Sommer.

In November 2022, Ruiz was named to the 26-man squad for the 2022 FIFA World Cup, his final tournament for Costa Rica as he retired after the tournament.

== Career statistics ==
=== Club ===
Appearances and goals by club, season and competition
Club	Season	League			National cup		League cup		Continental		Other		Total	
Club	Season	Division	Apps	Goals	Apps	Goals	Apps	Goals	Apps	Goals	Apps	Goals	Apps	Goals
Alajuelense	2003–04	Costa Rican Primera División	20	3	—		—		10 (Note: Six appearances and four goals in UNCAF Interclub Cup, four appearances and one goal in CONCACAF Champions Cup)	5	—		30	8
Alajuelense	2004–05	Costa Rican Primera División	31	13	—		—		—		—		31	13
Alajuelense	2005–06	Costa Rican Primera División	35	8	—		—		11 (Note: Seven appearances and six goals in UNCAF Interclub Cup, four appearances in CONCACAF Champions Cup)	6	—		46	14
Alajuelense	Total		86	24	—		—		21	11	0	0	107	35
Gent	2006–07	Belgian First Division	16	3	2	0	—		1 (Note: Appearance(s) in UEFA Intertoto Cup)	0	—		19	3
Gent	2007–08	Belgian First Division	31	11	7	3	—		1	0	—		39	14
Gent	2008–09	Belgian First Division	32	12	4	2	—		2 (Note: Appearance(s) in UEFA Europa League)	0	—		38	14
Gent	Total		79	26	13	5	—		4	0	—		96	31
Twente	2009–10	Eredivisie	34	24	2	2	—		12 (Note: Two appearances in UEFA Champions League, ten appearances and two goals in UEFA Europa League)	2	—		48	28
Twente	2010–11	Eredivisie	27	9	3	1	—		9 (Note: Five appearances in UEFA Champions League, four appearances in UEFA Europa League)	0	1 (Note: Appearance in Johan Cruyff Shield)	0	40	10
Twente	2011–12	Eredivisie	4	2	—		—		3 (Note: Appearance(s) in UEFA Champions League)	2	1	1	8	5
Twente	Total		65	35	5	3	—		24	4	2	1	96	43
Fulham	2011–12	Premier League	27	2	2	0	1	0	—		—		30	2
Fulham	2012–13	Premier League	29	5	2	0	1	0	—		—		32	5
Fulham	2013–14	Premier League	12	1	—		2	0	—		—		14	1
Fulham	2014–15	Championship	29	4	1	0	2	1	—		—		32	5
Fulham	Total		97	12	5	0	6	1	—		—		108	13
PSV Eindhoven (loan)	2013–14	Eredivisie	14	5	—		—		—		—		14	5
Sporting CP	2015–16	Primeira Liga	34	8	2	1	1	1	8 (Note: Two appearances in UEFA Champions League, six appearances and two goals in UEFA Europa League)	3	1 (Note: Appearance in Supertaça Cândido de Oliveira)	0	46	13
Sporting CP	2016–17	Primeira Liga	32	2	2	0	2	0	6	1	—		42	3
Sporting CP	2017–18	Primeira Liga	20	2	3	0	4	0	6	0	—		33	2
Sporting CP	Total		86	12	7	1	7	1	20	4	1	0	121	23
Santos	2018	Série A	12	0	—		—		2 (Note: Appearance(s) in Copa Libertadores)	0	—		14	0
Santos	2019	Série A	0	0	0	0	—		—		0	0	0	0
Santos	Total		12	0	0	0	0	0	2	0	0	0	14	0
Alajuelense	2020–21	Costa Rican Primera División	40	7	—		—		5 (Note: Four appearances and one goal in CONCACAF League, one appearance in CONCACAF Champions Cup)	1	—		45	8
Alajuelense	2021–22	Costa Rican Primera División	42	2	—		—		2 (Note: Appearance(s) in CONCACAF League)	0	1 (Note: Appearance in Supercopa de Costa Rica)	0	45	2
Alajuelense	2022–23	Costa Rican Primera División	13	2	—		—		5	0	—		18	2
Alajuelense	Total		95	11	0	0	0	0	12	1	1	0	108	12
Career total			534	125	30	9	13	2	83	20	4	1	664	157

=== International ===
Appearances and goals by national team and year
National team	Year	Apps	Goals
Costa Rica	2005	7	1
Costa Rica	2006	2	0
Costa Rica	2007	6	2
Costa Rica	2008	8	4
Costa Rica	2009	10	2
Costa Rica	2010	6	0
Costa Rica	2011	7	0
Costa Rica	2012	3	0
Costa Rica	2013	11	3
Costa Rica	2014	12	5
Costa Rica	2015	13	3
Costa Rica	2016	10	2
Costa Rica	2017	13	1
Costa Rica	2018	10	2
Costa Rica	2019	7	1
Costa Rica	2020	0	0
Costa Rica	2021	13	2
Costa Rica	2022	9	1
Total		147	29

Scores and results list Costa Rica's goal tally first, score column indicates score after each Ruiz goal.

List of international goals scored by Bryan Ruiz
No.	Date	Venue	Opponent	Score	Result	Competition
1	16 July 2005	Gillette Stadium, Foxborough, United States	Honduras	2–3	2–3	2005 CONCACAF Gold Cup
2	24 March 2007	Estadio Ricardo Saprissa Aymá, San José, Costa Rica	New Zealand	3–0	4–0	Friendly
3	2 June 2007	Estadio Ricardo Saprissa Aymá, San José, Costa Rica	Chile	2–0	2–0	Friendly
4	21 June 2008	Estadio Ricardo Saprissa Aymá, San José, Costa Rica	Grenada	2–0	3–0	2010 FIFA World Cup qualification
5	6 September 2008	Estadio Ricardo Saprissa Aymá, San José, Costa Rica	Suriname	7–0	7–0	2010 FIFA World Cup qualification
6	10 September 2008	Stade Sylvio Cator, Port-au-Prince, Haiti	Haiti	1–0	3–2	2010 FIFA World Cup qualification
7	10 September 2008	Stade Sylvio Cator, Port-au-Prince, Haiti	Haiti	2–1	3–2	2010 FIFA World Cup qualification
8	14 October 2009	Robert F. Kennedy Memorial Stadium, Washington, United States	United States	1–0	2–2	2010 FIFA World Cup qualification
9	14 October 2009	Robert F. Kennedy Memorial Stadium, Washington, United States	United States	2–0	2–2	2010 FIFA World Cup qualification
10	6 February 2013	Estadio Rommel Fernández, Panama City, Panama	Panama	2–2	2–2	2014 FIFA World Cup qualification
11	18 June 2013	Estadio Nacional, San José, Costa Rica	Panama	2–0	2–0	2014 FIFA World Cup qualification
12	15 October 2013	Estadio Nacional, San José, Costa Rica	Mexico	1–0	2–1	2014 FIFA World Cup qualification
13	2 June 2014	Raymond James Stadium, Tampa, United States	Japan	1–0	1–3	Friendly
14	20 June 2014	Arena Pernambuco, Recife, Brazil	Italy	1–0	1–0	2014 FIFA World Cup
15	29 June 2014	Arena Pernambuco, Recife, Brazil	Greece	1–0	1–1 (5–3 pen.)	2014 FIFA World Cup
16	13 September 2014	Los Angeles Memorial Coliseum, Los Angeles United States	Guatemala	1–1	2–1	2014 Copa Centroamericana
17	13 November 2014	Estadio Centenario, Montevideo, Uruguay	Uruguay	2–1	3–3	Friendly
18	11 July 2015	BBVA Compass Stadium, Houston, United States	El Salvador	1–0	1–1	2015 CONCACAF Gold Cup
19	8 September 2015	Estadio Nacional, San José, Costa Rica	Uruguay	1–0	1–0	Friendly
20	17 November 2015	Estadio Rommel Fernández, Panama City, Panama	Panama	1–0	2–1	2018 FIFA World Cup qualification
21	29 March 2016	Estadio Nacional, San José, Costa Rica	Jamaica	2–0	3–0	2018 FIFA World Cup qualification
22	9 October 2016	Krasnodar Stadium, Krasnodar, Russia	Russia	2–0	4–3	Friendly
23	13 June 2017	Estadio Nacional, San José, Costa Rica	Trinidad and Tobago	2–1	2–1	2018 FIFA World Cup qualification
24	11 June 2018	King Baudouin Stadium, Brussels, Belgium	Belgium	1–0	1–4	Friendly
25	11 October 2018	Estadio Universitario, San Nicolás de los Garza, Mexico	Mexico	2–1	2–3	Friendly
26	29 June 2019	NRG Stadium, Houston, United States	Mexico	1–1	1–1 (4–5 pen.)	2019 CONCACAF Gold Cup
27	20 July 2021	Exploria Stadium, Orlando, United States	Jamaica	1–0	1–0	2021 CONCACAF Gold Cup
28	10 October 2021	Estadio Nacional, San José, Costa Rica	El Salvador	1–1	2–1	2022 FIFA World Cup qualification
29	27 January 2022	Estadio Nacional, San José, Costa Rica	Panama	1–0	1–0	2022 FIFA World Cup qualification

== Honours ==
Alajuelense

- CONCACAF Champions' Cup: 2004
- Copa Interclubes UNCAF: 2005
- Primera División: Apertura 2005, Clausura 2006, Apertura 2020
- CONCACAF League: 2020

Twente

- Eredivisie: 2009–10
- KNVB Cup: 2010–11
- Johan Cruyff Shield: 2010, 2011

Sporting CP

- Taça da Liga: 2017–18
- Supertaça Cândido de Oliveira: 2015

Costa Rica

- Copa Centroamericana: 2014

Individual

- CONCACAF Men's Player of the Year: 2016
- CONCACAF Goal of the Year: 2014
- CONCACAF Best XI: 2015, 2016, 2017
- Jean-Claude Bouvy Trophy: 2008, 2009
- Player of the season at FC Twente: 2010
- BBC Goal of the Month: October 2011
- IFFHS CONCACAF team of the decade 2011–2020
- IFFHS CONCACAF Men's Team of All Time: 2021

== Personal life ==
Ruiz has two brothers; one of them, Yendrick, is also a football player. Both Bryan and Yendrick were teammates in Alajuelense for a period of two weeks before Bryan signed for Gent. It was not until 14 August 2013, when both played together for the first time, in a friendly that Costa Rica played against Dominican Republic.

Ruiz worked as a columnist for Costa Rican sports newspaper Al Día from 2011 until the journal's ceasing in 2014.

== See also ==
- List of men's footballers with 100 or more international caps
