= Deepika (disambiguation) =

Deepika or Dipika is an Indian female given name.

Deepika may also refer to:

- Deepika (newspaper), Malayalam newspaper published in India
- Deepika English Medium School, a primary, middle and senior secondary school in Odisha, India

== See also ==
- Deepa (disambiguation)
- Deepam (disambiguation)
- DIPA (disambiguation)
- Diya (disambiguation)
- Deep (disambiguation)
