= Karthika (name) =

Kartika
- Gender: Female
- Language: Tamil; Hindi; Sanskrit

Origin
- Meaning: "bestower of courage"
- Region of origin: India

Other names
- Related names: Karthik, Kartik, Kartika

Karthika or Kartika (Tamil : கார்த்திகா , Hindi : कर्थिका, Malayalam : കാർത്തിക) is a popular Indian divine feminine name derived from the god Kartikeya, which means "bestower of courage".

Notable people with the given name of Karthika include:

- Karthika (Malayalam actress) - Malayali actress from 1980s and 90s
- Karthika Adaikalam, Tamil actress
- Karthika Mathew, Malayali actress
- Karthika Nair (born 1992), Indian actress and model
- Karthika Thirunal Lakshmi Bayi (1916–2008), Indian queen and linguist
- Kartika Rane, Indian actress
- Kartika Liotard, member of the European Parliament

== See also ==
- Karthik (disambiguation)
- Karthikeyan
- alternative transliteration of Karthik
- Kartikeya, the son of Shiva in the Indian mythology
