= Diya =

Diya may refer to:

- Diya (film), 2018 Indian Tamil- and Telugu-language film
- Diya (Islam), Islamic term for monetary compensation for bodily harm or property damage
- Diya (lamp), ghee- or oil-based candle often used in religious ceremonies and worship in Indian religions
- Diya (name), list of people with the name
- Diya TV, American TV network dedicated to South Asian programming
- Diya Women Football Club, Pakistani football club in Karachi
- Ad-Diya, cultural magazine in Egypt
- The proper name of the star WASP-72

== See also ==
- Dia (disambiguation)
- Deepa (disambiguation)
- Deepam (disambiguation)
- Deepika (disambiguation)
- Diya Aur Toofan (disambiguation)
- Diaa, given name
- Diia, Ukrainian electronic public administration platform
- Deeya, given name
