= Diya Aur Toofan =

Diya Aur Toofan (lit. 'Lamp and Storm') may refer to:

- Diya Aur Toofan (1969 film), a 1969 Pakistani Urdu romantic comedy film
- Diya Aur Toofan (1995 film), a 1995 Indian Hindi-language film by K. Bapaiah, starring Mithun Chakraborty and Madhoo

== See also ==
- Diya (disambiguation)
- Toofan (disambiguation)
