= Deeya =

Deeya is a given name. Notable people with the name include:

- Deeya Suzannah Bajaj (born 1994), Indian adventure sports athlete
- Deeya Chopra (born 1985), Indian actress
- Deeya Maskey, Nepalese actress and dancer

== See also ==
- Deeyah
- Diya (disambiguation)
