= Deepa (disambiguation) =

Deepa is a Hindu/Sanskrit Indian given name.

Deepa may also refer to:

- Unni Mary, Indian actress, also known as Deepa
- Deepa Desai, a character in the Indian KGF (film series)
- Deepa (album), a 1992 album by American band Troop, and its title track
- Deepa, Meghalaya, India, site of a proposed station on the Dudhnoi - Mendipathar Rail Line
- Diya (lamp), an Indian clay lamp

== See also ==
- DIPA (disambiguation)
- Deepam (disambiguation)
- Diya (disambiguation)
- Deepika (disambiguation)
- Deep (disambiguation)
