= Dip angle =

Dip angle may refer to:

- Magnetic dip, the angle of the Earth's magnetic field lines relative to the horizontal
- Dip (geology), the angle of a planar geological feature relative to the horizontal
- Dip angle, the angle between the apparent and the astronomical horizons

== See also ==
- Dip (disambiguation)
