= Tufani =

Tufani may refer to:

- Tufani, a village in Independenţa, Constanţa County, Romania
- Tufani, a village in Drăgăneşti, Prahova County, Romania
- Tufani Saroj, Indian politician
- Toofani Tarzan, 1937 Indian film

== See also ==
- Tufan (disambiguation)
- Toofan (disambiguation)
