= Typhoon (disambiguation) =

A typhoon is a strong tropical cyclone in the western Pacific Ocean.

Typhoon may also refer to:

== Military ==
=== Aircraft ===
- Eurofighter Typhoon, a European-designed multirole combat aircraft
- Hawker Typhoon, a British World War II aircraft
- Messerschmitt Taifun, a German aircraft of the interwar period

=== Ships ===
- RMAS Typhoon (A95), an ocean-going tug of the Royal Maritime Auxiliary Service
- Typhoon-class submarine in the Soviet and Russian navies
- USS Typhoon, a US Navy ship launched in 1993

=== Other military ===
- Taifun (rocket), German World War II unguided anti-aircraft rocket system
- Typhoon, the German codename for the military offensive directed against Moscow in 1941; see Battle of Moscow
- Typhoon Weapon Station, an Israeli remote weapon station
- Typhoon (armored fighting vehicles family), Russian mine-resistant ambush protected armored vehicles
  - Kamaz Typhoon
  - Ural Typhoon

== Transportation ==
- Armstrong Siddeley Typhoon, a two-door coupé car
- FPV F6 Typhoon, a high-performance Australian sports sedan
- GMC Typhoon, a high-performance sport-utility vehicle
- Piaggio Typhoon, a motor scooter manufactured by Piaggio
- Rambler Typhoon, a special version of the Rambler Classic two-door hardtop
- Typhoon, a British steam locomotive operating on the Romney, Hythe and Dymchurch Railway
- Typhoon 18, an American sailboat design
- Typhoon Senior, an American sailboat design

== Arts and entertainment ==
=== Film ===
- The Typhoon, a 1914 American film
- Typhoon (1933 film), a German film directed by Robert Wiene
- Typhoon (1940 film), an American film
- Typhoon (2005 film), a 2005 South Korean action film

=== Literature ===
- Typhoon (novella), a 1902 novel by Joseph Conrad
- Typhoon (play) (Taifun), a 1909 play by Melchior Lengyel
- Typhoon, a 1992 novel by Mark Joseph
- De Typhoon, a Dutch local newspaper (1944–92)
- Typhoon (comics), a DC Comics villain

=== Music ===
- Typhoon (American band), a band based in Portland, Oregon
- Typhoon (South Korean band)
- Typhoon (Korean singer), former stage name of Kim Kyun-woo, now going by 'Jay'
- Typhoon (rapper), Dutch rapper
- Typhoons (album), a 2021 Royal Blood album

=== Other entertainment ===
- Typhoon, a water coaster ride at Six Flags New England amusement park
- Typhoon (video game), the name outside Japan for the video game A-Jax
- Typhoon (simulator), a motion simulator created by Triotech Amusement
- Typhoon Studios, a defunct Canadian video game developer
- Typhoon (Bobbejaanland), a Gerstlauer Euro-Fighter model roller coaster, Belgium
- Typhoon Graphics, a Japanese animation studio

== Sports ==
- Typhoon II, winner of the 1897 Kentucky Derby
- Frank Tyson (1930–2015), English cricketer, nicknamed Typhoon
- Fred Ottman (born 1956), American professional wrestler, stage name Typhoon
- Kyoji Horiguchi (born 1990), Japanese mixed martial artist, nickname The Typhoon
- Typhoons (women's cricket), an Irish women's cricket team

== Other uses ==
- HTC Typhoon, a Windows Mobile Smartphone

== See also ==
- Typhoon No.15 ~B'z Live-Gym The Final Pleasure "It's Showtime!!" in Nagisaen~, a live VHS/DVD by Japanese rock duo B'z
- Typhoo, a brand of tea in the UK
- Typhoon shelter, a shelter for fishing boats during typhoons
- Typhon (disambiguation)
- Taifun (disambiguation)
- Toofan (disambiguation)
