= Deeper and Deeper (disambiguation) =

"Deeper and Deeper" is a song by Madonna.

Deeper and Deeper may also refer to:

- Deeper and Deeper (film), a 2010 erotic psychological thriller starring David Lago
- "Deeper and Deeper" (hymn), a 1915 hymn by Oswald J. Smith
- "Saw Something / Deeper and Deeper", a 2008 song by Dave Gahan
- "Deeper and Deeper", a 1970 single by Freda Payne
- "Deeper and Deeper", a 1974 song by Bo Donaldson and The Heywoods
- "Deeper and Deeper", a song by Loretta Lynn from the album Making Love from Memory
- "Deeper and Deeper", a 1983 single by Joe Dolan
- "Deeper and Deeper", a 1984 song by The Fixx from the soundtrack to Streets of Fire

== See also ==
- Deeper (disambiguation)
