= Typhon (disambiguation) =

Typhon is a character from Greek mythology who is the final son of Gaia.

Typhon may also refer to:

== Fiction ==
- Typhon (comics), a Marvel Comics character who was an enemy of Hercules
- Typhon (Final Fantasy), a recurring character in the Final Fantasy franchise
- Typhon (Re:Zero), a character in the light novel series Re:Zero − Starting Life in Another World
- An antagonist in several Gene Wolfe novels including The Book of the New Sun
- One of the Titans in the 2019 film King of the Monsters
- An Arknights character who appears in multiple stories involving the country of Sami
- A species of alien in the 2017 video game Prey
- The main planetary setting in the 2016 video game Titanfall 2

== Other ==
- Typhon Combat System, a cancelled integrated weapons system developed by the United States Navy that used:
  - RIM-50 Typhon, a long-range anti-aircraft guided missile to provide ship-based fleet air defense
- Typhon missile launcher
- 42355 Typhon, a minor planet
- Caudron Typhon, a 1930s French high-speed single-seat monoplane utility aircraft built by Caudron-Renault
- French destroyer Typhon, a 1925 Bourrasque-class destroyer
- TVR Typhon, a sports car
- USS Typhon (ARL-28), a 1945 United States Navy Achelous-class landing craft repair ship
- A miniature gaming set made by Alternative Armies
- Dreadbox Typhon, an analog synthesizer made by instrument manufacturer Dreadbox FX

== See also ==
- Typhoon (disambiguation)
