= Deeper =

Deeper may refer to:

== Books ==
- Deeper (Gordon and Williams novel), a 2008 Tunnels novel by Roderick Gordon and Brian Williams
- Deeper (Long novel), a 2007 novel by Jeff Long

== Films ==
- Deeper (2010 film), an extreme alpine sports film by Teton Gravity Research
- Deeper (2025 film), an Australian feature documentary about cave diving by Jennifer Peedom

== Music ==
=== Bands ===
- Deeper (band)

=== Albums ===
- Deeper (Delirious? album) or the title song (see below), 2001
- Deeper (Lisa Stansfield album) or the title song, 2018
- Deeper (Meredith Andrews album) or the title song, 2016
- Deeper (The Soft Moon album) or the title song, 2015
- Deeper, by Julie Anne San Jose, 2014
- Deeper, by Planetshakers, 2009
- Deeper (EP), by MadGibbs, or the title song, 2013
- Deeper, an EP by Ella Eyre, or the title song, 2013

=== Songs ===
- "Deeper" (Boss song), 1993
- "Deeper" (Delirious? song), 1997
- "Deeper" (Serious Danger song), 1997
- "Deeper", by the Cat Empire from Where the Angels Fall, 2023
- "Deeper", by MNEK and Riton, 2017
- "Deeper", by Olly Murs from 24 Hrs, 2016
- "Deeper", by PartyNextDoor from Some Sexy Songs 4 U, 2025
- "Deeper", by Plan B from Heaven Before All Hell Breaks Loose, 2018
- "Deeper", by Samantha Fox from 21st Century Fox, 1997
- "Deeper", by Summer Walker, 2020

== See also ==
- Deep (disambiguation)
- Deeper and Deeper (disambiguation)
