= Kartik Chandran =

American environmental engineer

- Education: Indian Institute of Technology Roorkee (B.S.); University of Connecticut (Ph.D.)
- Awards: MacArthur Fellowship (2015); WERF Paul Busch Award (2010); NSF CAREER Award, (2009)
- Scientific career
- Fields: Environmental Engineering
- Workplaces: Columbia University

Kartik Chandran is an American environmental engineer and professor in the Department of Earth and Environmental Engineering at Columbia University. His research focuses on the intersection of environmental molecular microbiology, biotechnology and engineering, particularly in elucidating the molecular microbial ecology and metabolic pathways of the nitrogen cycle. Applications of his work include energy-efficient treatment of nitrogen-containing wastewater, sustainable sanitation approaches, and innovative models for resource recovery. Under his leadership, Columbia University established its first programs for resource recovery of biological wastewater treatment and biological nutrient removal were established for the first ever time in the history of Columbia University.

In 2015, he received the MacArthur Fellowship for his innovative work on "integrating microbial ecology, molecular biology, and engineering to transform wastewater from a troublesome pollutant to a valuable resource".

== Education and career ==
Chandran earned a B.S.(Honors) in chemical engineering from the University of Roorkee, now the Indian Institute of Technology, Roorkee. He obtained his Ph.D. in environmental engineering at the University of Connecticut in 1999, followed by a post-doctoral fellowship until 2001. From 2001 to 2004, he worked as a senior technical specialist with the engineering firm, Metcalf and Eddy (now part of AECOM). He then worked as a research associate at Virginia Polytechnic Institute and State University from 2004 to 2005 before joining Columbia University in 2005 as an assistant professor of Environmental Engineering.

== Select Awards and Honors ==
Chandran's contributions have been recognized with several award:

- Harry Kinsel Award for Best Scientific Publication, Metcalf and Eddy (2003)
- National Research Council Summer Faculty Fellow (2007)
- National Science Foundation Early CAREER Development Award (2009)
- Water Environment Research Foundation Paul Busch Award (2010)
- Member Board of Trustees, Water Environment Federation (2010–2013)
- Fellow, Water Environment Federation (2013)
- Guest Professor, Royal Dutch Academy of Arts and Sciences (2014)
- Invited Participant, National Academy of Engineering, China America Frontiers of Engineering (2015)
- MacArthur Fellows Program (2015)

== Selected works ==
Chandran has authored several notable publications, including:

- S Vajpeyi, K Chandran*, 2015, "Microbial conversion of synthetic and food waste-derived volatile fatty acids to lipids", Bioresource Technology 188, 49–55
- Khunjar, W.*, D. Jiang, B. Wett, S. Murthy and K. Chandran*, 2015 "Characterizing the metabolic tradeoff in Nitrosomonas europaea in response to changes in inorganic carbon supply", Environmental Science and Technology, 2015, 49 (4), pp 2523–2531
- Ma, Y., S. Sundar, H. Park, and K. Chandran*, 2015, "The effect of inorganic carbon on microbial interactions in a biofilm nitritation-anammox process", Water Research, 70, 246–254
- Lu, H., K. Chandran*, H. D. Stensel, 2014 "Microbial ecology of denitrification in biological wastewater treatment", Water Research, 64, 237–254
- Lu, H. M. Kalyuzhnaya and K. Chandran*, 2012 "Comparative proteomic and transcriptional analysis reveal insights into facultative methylotrophy of Methyloversatilis universalis FAM5*", Environmental Microbiology, 14(11), 2935–2945.
- Wang, J. S.*, S. P. Hamburg, D. E. Pryor, K. Chandran, G. T. Daigger, 2011 "Emissions credits: Opportunity to promote integrated nitrogen management in the wastewater sector", Environmental Science and Technology, 45(15), 6239–6246
- Ahn, J.-H., S. Kim, H. Park, K. Pagilla and K. Chandran*, 2010 "N2O emissions from activated sludge 2008-2009: Results of a nationwide monitoring survey in the United States" Environmental Science and Technology, 44(12), 4505–4511.
- Park, H., A. Rosenthal, K. Ramalingam, J. Fillos and K. Chandran*, 2010 "Linking community profiles, gene expression and N-removal in anammox bioreactors treating municipal anaerobic digestion reject water" Environmental Science and Technology, 44(16), 6110–6116.
- Yu, R., M. Kampschreur, M. C. M. van Loosdrecht and K. Chandran*, 2010 "Mechanisms and specific directionality in autotrophic nitrous oxide and nitric oxide generation during transient anoxia" Environmental Science and Technology, 44(4), 1313–1319.
- David Jenkins; Jiri Wanner (1 April 2014). "Nitrogen". Activated Sludge - 100 Years and Counting. IWA Publishing. pp. 77–. ISBN 978-1-78040-493-6.
