= Dia (Bithynia) =

Port city of ancient Bithynia

Coordinates: 41°05′15″N 31°07′26″E

Dia (Ancient Greek: Δῖα), also Diospolis (Διόσπολις), was a port city of ancient Bithynia on the Pontus Euxinus in Asia Minor. Marcian of Heraclea places it 60 stadia east of the mouth of the Hypius, which river is between the Sangarius River and Heraclea Pontica. The name in Marcian, Diaspolis (Δίας πόλις), may be a mistake for Diospolis, which Ptolemy has. There are some very rare coins with the epigraph Dias (Διας), which Sestini assigns to this place.

Its site is located near Akçakoca in Turkey.
