= Deepika Kurup =

American inventor and clean water advocate (born 1998)

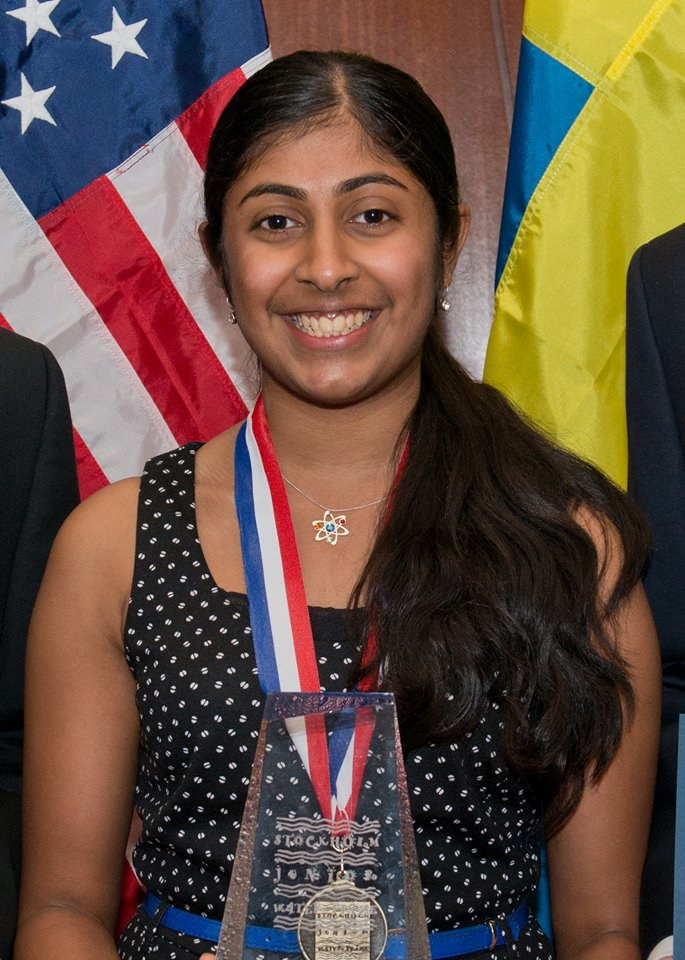
- Born: April 12, 1998 (age 28); Nashua, New Hampshire, U.S.
- Education: Harvard University Stanford University

Deepika Kurup (born April 12, 1998) is an inventor and clean water advocate. She is the recipient of the 2012 Discovery Education 3M Young Scientist Award. Kurup was awarded the $25,000 Award for her work in developing a new and inexpensive method to clean water using solar power. She also a finalist in the 2014 international Stockholm Junior Water Prize with her project "A Novel Photocatalytic Pervious Composite for Degrading Organics and Inactivating Bacteria in Wastewater."

In January 2015, Kurup was named as one of the Forbes 2015 30 Under 30 in Energy. She has also been featured in Teen Vogue for her work. She is currently a student at Stanford School of Medicine.

== Background ==
Deepika Kurup was born in Nashua, New Hampshire. She has given a number of accounts of what inspired her to work on water purification. In her entry video to the competition, she explains the mechanism used for developing her invention and also explains some of the factors that led to the invention.

== Water purification method ==
Kurup's initial idea that won her the Discovery Education 3M Young Scientist in 2012 is based on using a photocatalytic compound for water purification. This project involved a photocatalytic composite made up of titanium dioxide and zinc oxide, hollow glass microspheres, and Portland cement. In 2012 Kurup's photocatalytic composite was able to reduce the amount of total coliform from 8000 colony-forming units to 50. In addition, it oxidized Methylene blue at a faster rate than standard solar disinfection methods.

She improved her method and after 3 years developed a previous photocatalytic composite using sand, TiO_{2}, Portland cement and silver nitrate. This photocatalytic previous composite showed a 98% reduction in total coliform bacteria immediately after filtration. Exposure of the filtered water to sunlight with a photocatalytic composite disc resulted in 100% inactivation of total coliform bacteria in just 15 minutes. She was a finalist in the 2014 international Stockholm Junior Water Prize

She also is the National Geographic winner in the 2015 Google Science Fair.

== Personal life ==
Her father Pradeep Kurup, a civil engineering professor at the University of Massachusetts Lowell, came to United States in 1983 from India. Her mother, Meena Kurup, is originally from the southern Indian state of Kerala. Deepika Kurup grew up in Nashua, New Hampshire. Every year while she was growing up, Deepika’s parents would take her to visit India, where she noticed how different the two nations were. One of the most striking differences she observed was the access to clean water. In India, many of the children outside her grandparents’ house would be collecting dirty, unsanitary water in plastic bottles to use for drinking, cooking their food, and washing their clothes. Deepika saw the deeper issues with this crisis, such as the fact that girls without access to clean water are forced to sacrifice their education in certain circumstances such as during their period when they have no clean clothes. According to Deepika, “instead of spending time with their family and instead of spending time working and raising money, women have to walk hours on end every day to go collect water.” Deepika felt inspired to create something that would improve the global water crisis, and thus, started to educate herself on this international issue. In 2016, Deepika founded Catalyst for World Water, a social enterprise which is focused on expanding her water purification invention and distributing it across the globe to broaden access to clean water. Deepika’s efforts are tied with viewing access to clean water as a global human right. Deepika is planning on concentrating her study in Neurobiology.
