= Tufal =

Tufal طوفال
- Village
- Location within Iran
- Coordinates: 35°56′20″N 59°41′21″E
- Country: Iran
- Province: Razavi Khorasan
- County: Fariman
- Bakhsh: Central
- Rural District: Sang Bast

Population (2006)
  - Total: 124
- Time zone: UTC+3:30 (IRST)
  - Summer (DST): UTC+4:30 (IRDT)

Tufal (Persian: طوفال, also Romanized as Ţūfāl; also known as Ţūfān; Persian: طوفان) is a village in Sang Bast Rural District, in the Central District of Fariman County, Razavi Khorasan Province, Iran. At the 2006 census, its population was 124, in 27 families.
