= Digital Image Processing with Sound =

DIPS
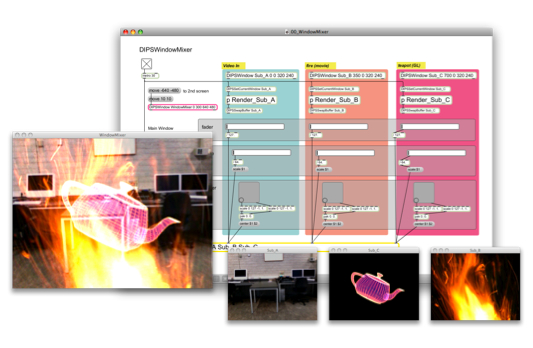
- Developer: DIPS Development Group
- Stable release: 4.1.1 / August 1, 2009; 17 years ago
- Operating system: Mac OS X
- Type: music and multimedia development
- Website: http://dips.kcm-sd.ac.jp

Digital Image Processing with Sound (DIPS) is a set of plug-in objects that handle real-time digital image processing in Max/MSP programming environment. Combining with the built-in objects of the environment, DIPS enables to program the interaction between audio and visual events with ease, and supports the realization of interactive multimedia art as well as interactive computer music.

== Summary of Features ==
- A plug-in software for Max/MSP (Max 5 and 6)
- More than 300 Max external objects and abstractions
- More than 90 OpenGL objects included
- More than 110 visual effect objects (Dfx library, Core Image Filters)
- A utility library for the easy of programming (prefix Dlib)
- A comprehensive set of sample patches, and a detailed tutorial
- Handling images & movie files (QuickTime, OpenGL)
- Render and move 3D models (OpenGL)
- Video signal input (QuickTime, video texture)
- Video input analysis: motion detect, face tracking (OpenCV, OpenGL)
- Importing 3D models (.obj file)
- Importing Quartz Composer files
- OpenGL Shading Language (GLSL) programming interface
- Easy integration of visual events using DIPSWindowMixer (OpenGL)

== Description ==
DIPS is a free plug-in software (a set of external objects) for Max/MSP. It supports the designing of the interaction between sound and visual events in Max using Apple’s Core Image, OpenGL and OpenCV technologies, and consequently, provides a powerful and user-friendly programming environment for the creation of interactive multimedia art.

DIPS can be used to detect a performer’s motions and to track positions of subtle details, such as the face, mouth, and eyes. It can also be used to measure the distance between objects and a Kinect sensor system, and offers powerful tools for realtime image processing of incoming video stream and stored movie files. In addition, it can be used to create complex images in a virtual three-dimensional space.

The DIPS consists of a library of more than 300 Max external objects and abstractions, a comprehensive set of sample patches, and a detailed tutorial. Some of its strong points, in comparison with other similar plug-ins and software, are its ease of programming, power, and efficiency.

The sample patches and tutorial contained in the installation package allows composers and artists who are interested in the creation of interactive art to realize sophisticated realtime video effects on a live video signal at their first practice. It aims to facilitate the acquisition of skills needed to create interactive performance works, multimedia installations, interactive multimedia artworks, and Max VJ applications using DIPS.

== History ==
Initially developed by Shu Matsuda in 1997, DIPS was a plug-in software for Max/FTS running on SGI Octane and O2 computers. Since 2000, it has been developed by the DIPS Development Group supervised by Takayuki Rai. Current active group members are Shu Matsuda, Yota Morimoto, Takuto Fukuda, and Keitaro Takahashi. Previously, Chikashi Miyama, Daichi Ando and Takayuki Hamano also contributed to its development.

- 2013 DIPS5 for Max (Mac OS X)
- 2009 DIPS4 for Max/MSP (Mac OS X)
- 2006 DIPS3 for Max/MSP (Mac OS X)
- 2003 DIPS2 for jMax4 (Mac OS X)
- 2002 DIPS for jMax2 (Mac OS X & Linux)
- 2000 DIPS for jMax (Linux)
