= Diindenoperylene =

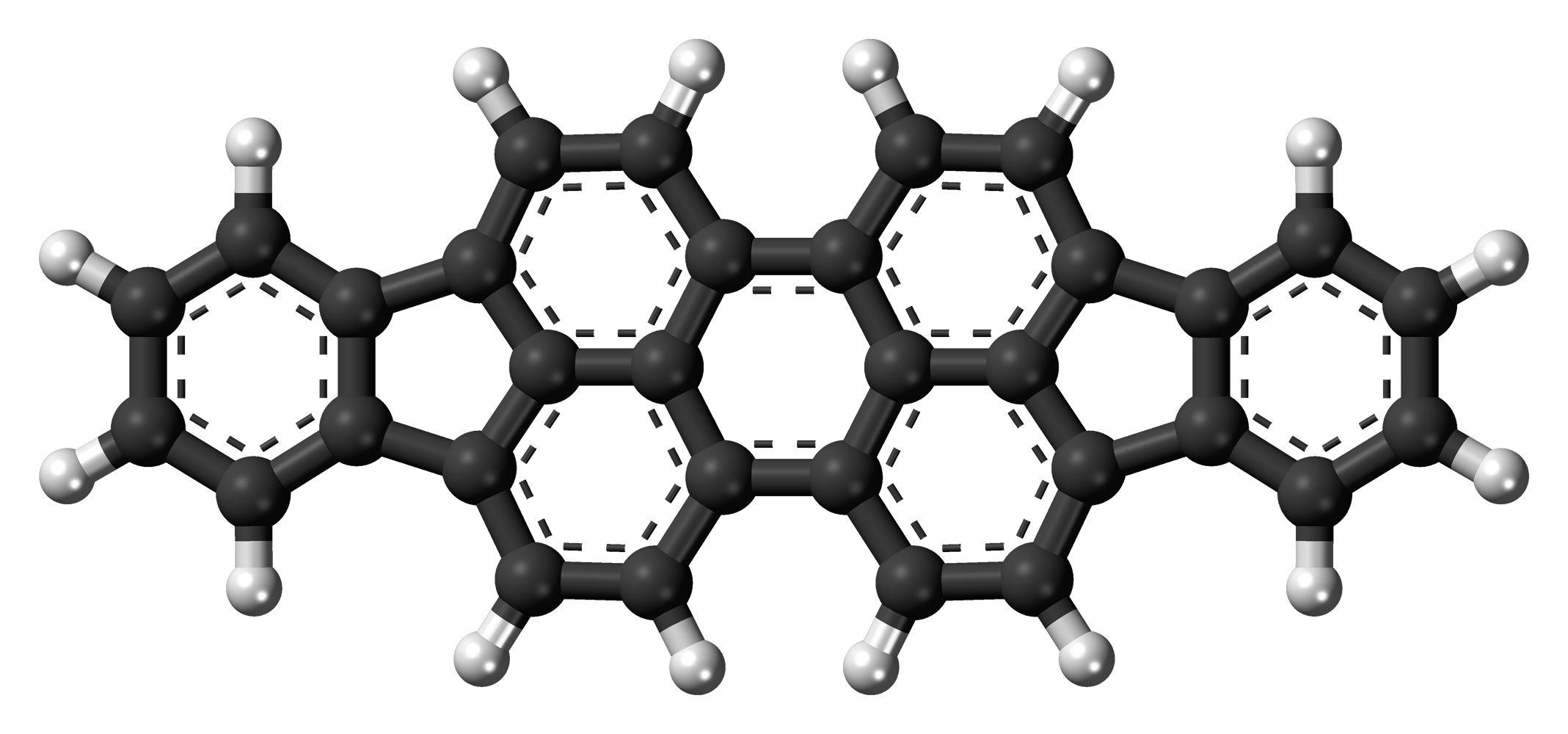

Names
- Preferred IUPAC name Diindeno[1,2,3-cd:1′,2′,3′-lm]perylene
- Other names Periflanthen; Periflanthene

Identifiers
CAS Number	188-94-3
3D model (JSmol)	Interactive image
Abbreviations	DIP
ChemSpider	87318
ECHA InfoCard	100.005.343
PubChem CID	96712
UNII	TQA4WPL7Y8
CompTox Dashboard (EPA)	DTXSID40172139
- InChI: InChI=1S/C32H16/c1-2-6-18-17(5-1)21-9-13-25-27-15-11-23-19-7-3-4-8-20(19)24-12-16-28(32(27)30(23)24)26-14-10-22(18)29(21)31(25)26/h1-16H Key: BKMIWBZIQAAZBD-UHFFFAOYSA-N; InChI=1/C32H16/c1-2-6-18-17(5-1)21-9-13-25-27-15-11-23-19-7-3-4-8-20(19)24-12-16-28(32(27)30(23)24)26-14-10-22(18)29(21)31(25)26/h1-16H Key: BKMIWBZIQAAZBD-UHFFFAOYAB
- SMILES: C1=CC2=C3C=CC4=C5C=CC6=C7C=CC=CC7=C8C6=C5C(=C9C4=C3C(=C2C=C1)C=C9)C=C8

Properties
Chemical formula	C_{32}H_{16}
Molar mass	400.480 g·mol^{−1}
Appearance	Orange solid
Boiling point	>330 °C (sublimation)
- Except where otherwise noted, data are given for materials in their standard state (at 25 °C [77 °F], 100 kPa). verify (what is ?) Infobox references

Diindenoperylene (DIP) is an organic semiconductor which receives attention because of its potential application in optoelectronics (solar cells, OLEDs) and electronics (RFID tags). DIP is a planar perylene derivative with two indeno-groups attached to opposite sides of the perylene core. Its chemical formula is C_{32}H_{16}, the full chemical name is diindeno[1,2,3-cd:1',2',3'-lm]perylene. Its chemical synthesis has been described.

== Properties and uses ==
The molecular weight is 400.48 g/mol, the dimensions of the molecule in its plane are ~18.4×7 Å. and its sublimation temperature is above 330 °C. It is non-polar and therefore only slightly soluble, for example in acetone.

DIP is a red dye and has been used as active material for optical recording. Because of its 'perylene-type' optical emission in the visible spectrum, it has also been used in organic light emitting diodes. Organic field effect transistors of DIP have been studied. The charge carrier mobility achieved was up to 0.1 cm^{2}/(V·s) for thin film transistors with silicon dioxide as gate dielectric, making DIP a good candidate for further optimisation.

The structure of bulk DIP crystals has recently been studied by Pflaum et al., who found two distinct phases at room temperature and at temperatures above 160 °C. In thin films for growth 'near equilibrium' (at substrate temperature of about 130 °C) by organic molecular beam deposition (OMBD), DIP has been shown to order very well. The structure of thin DIP films has been characterized 'post-growth', with structures differing from the room-temperature bulk structure. These thin-film structures depend on the substrate used, and also on the substrate temperature during growth.
