= Deepavali (disambiguation) =

Deepavali or Diwali is an Indian festival.

Deepavali or Dipawali may also refer to:

- Dipawali (Jainism), a festival in Jainism
- Deepavali (1960 film), an Indian Telugu-language mythological film
- Deepavali (2000 film), an Indian Kannada-language film starring Vishnuvardhan and Ramesh Aravind
- Deepavali (2007 film), an Indian Tamil-language film starring Jayam Ravi and Bhavana
- Deepavali (2008 film), an Indian Telugu-language film starring Venu Thottempudi and Megha Nair
- "Diwali" (The Office), an episode of the American comedy television series The Office

== See also ==
- Karthika Deepam (disambiguation)
- Deepavali Bonus, a 2024 Indian-Tamil language film
