= Depth charge (disambiguation) =

Depth charge may refer to:

- Depth charge, an anti-submarine weapon fused to go off at a certain depth
- Depth charge (cocktail), a cocktail made by dropping a shot glass of liquor into a glass partially filled with some other beverage
- Depth Charge (horse), a thoroughbred racehorse
- Depth Charge (film), a 1960 film directed by Jeremy Summers
- Depth Charge, a video game for the Apple II
- Depthcharge, a 1977 arcade game produced by UPL
- Depth Charge (Transformers), a character in Transformers universe
- Depth Charge (G.I. Joe), a fictional character in the G.I. Joe universe

== Music ==
- Depth Charge (EP), an EP by Little Nobody
- Depth Charge, an alias of British DJ and multi-instrumentalist Jonathan Saul Kane
- "Depth Charge", a song by Flume from his EP Skin Companion EP 2
- "Depth Charge", a song by Devin Townsend from his album Accelerated Evolution
- "Depth Charge", a song by DJ Shadow from his album The Mountain Will Fall
