= Deepu =

Deepu is a given name. Notable people with the name include:

- Deepu Karunakaran (born 1977), Indian film director
- Deepu Pradeep (born 1989), Indian script writer
