= Rami Raofat =

Egyptian/Danish footballer (born 1990)

Personal information
- Date of birth: August 20, 1990 (age 36)
- Place of birth: Copenhagen, Denmark
- Height: 1.82 m (6 ft 0 in)
- Positions: Central midfielder; right winger

Team information
- Current team: FC Nordsjælland
- Number: 6

Youth career
- 2006–: FC Nordsjælland

Senior career*
Years	Team	Apps	(Gls)
2008–2010	FC Nordsjælland		

International career^{‡}
2008–	Denmark U-17		
- Egypt U-20
- * Club domestic league appearances and goals as of October 1, 2009 ‡ National team caps and goals as of October 1, 2009

Rami Raofat (Arabic: رامي رفعت) (born August 20, 1990) is a footballer. An all-round midfielder, he played for the Danish club FC Nordsjælland at youth level. Born in Denmark, he represented that nation and Egypt at youth international levels.

== Career ==
In December 2006, he trialed at Serie A's Reggina, but his education meant that he would have to wait before leaving Denmark.

From 2007 to the end of 2009, he was the captain of the FC Nordsjælland youth team.

In summer 2010, he trialed at Premier League club Sunderland and his performance in the trial attracted several Football League Championship teams who were interested in his service.

== International career ==
In early 2007, Raofat was called up to the Denmark Under-17 team.

In June 2008, at the age of 17, he received a call-up from the Denmark Under-19 team, but there was controversy over which national team he would choose, as Egypt had also shown interest.

A few months later though, Rami became officially a member of Egypt's youth team. He was called up by former manager Rabie Yassin. He made his debut in a friendly against Rwanda before the team was heading to African Youth Championship.
