= Karthik Sarma =

Indian businessman

- Born: 1974 or 1975 (age 50–51); India
- Education: Indian Institute of Technology Madras; Princeton University
- Occupation: Hedge fund manager

Karthik Sarma (born 1974/1975) is an Indian billionaire hedge fund manager. As of June 2023, his net worth was estimated at US$2.9 billion.

Sarma earned a bachelor's degree from the Indian Institute of Technology Madras, and a master's degree from Princeton University.

Sarma worked as a consultant at McKinsey & Co for three years before joining Tiger Global Management, where he worked for five years. In 2006, he founded the hedge fund SRS Investment Management and now manages $10 billion. SRS owns 43% of Avis Budget Group and Sarma is a director.

In 2021, Sarma was one of eight hedge fund managers to earn over $1 billion, with $2 billion, mostly from a 5.5 times rise in the Avis share price.

He lives in New York City.
