= Dia Nader de El-Andari =

Lebanese Venezuelan politician and diplomat

Ambassador Extraordinary and Plenipotentiary of Venezuela to Syria
- In office 2006–2009

Personal details
- Born: 1950 (age 75–76) Beirut, Lebanon
- Education: Patrice Lumumba University

Dia Nader de El-Andari (born 1950) is a Lebanese Venezuelan politician and diplomat, Ambassador Extraordinary and Plenipotentiary of Venezuela to Syria in 2006―2009 and Chargée d'affaires of the Embassy of Venezuela in Serbia in 2011–2019.

== Biography ==
Dia Nader de El-Andari was born in 1950 in Beirut, Lebanon. At the age of seventeen, she came to study in USSR and graduated from the Faculty of Physics and Mathematics and Natural Sciences of Peoples' Friendship University, majoring in physics in 1972. In 1975–1978, she studied at the graduate school of the University of Friendship of Peoples and in 1978 she defended her thesis. Afterwards, she spoke very warmly about the years she spent in USSR: "My father sent me here for he wanted me to learn how to love my homeland. I learned about friendship and brotherhood, and I think that his dream came true", she said in an interview. After returning to Venezuela she had worked at the University of Zulia for more than twenty years.

In 2004–2006 she served as an Advisor to the Foreign Minister of Venezuela for Asia, the Middle East and Oceania. In 2006–2009 she was Ambassador Extraordinary and Plenipotentiary of Venezuela to Syria.

Since 2011 she has been an Counselor-messenger and Chargée d'affaires of the Embassy of Venezuela in Serbia.

Dia Nader de El-Andari is a widow and has three children.

She starred in Canadian-Serbian documentary film The Weight of Chains 2, which is dedicated to the political and economic situation of the countries of former Yugoslavia.

She is fluent in Spanish, Arabic, Russian and English.
