= Diya (name) =

- Gender: Female

Origin
- Word/name: Indian
- Meaning: Light, lamp

Diya is a feminine given name and a surname. It is derived from the Sanskrit word ‘diyam’ which means ‘light’ or ‘lamp’. The name Diya symbolizes enlightenment, knowledge, and wisdom. It is also associated with the Hindu goddess of knowledge, Saraswati.

Notable people with the name are as follows:

== Given name ==
- Diya (actress) or Diya Sharma (born 1985), Indian actress
- Diya Beeltah (born 1988), Mauritian model
- Diya Kumari (born 1971), Indian politician
- Diya Siddique (born 2004), Bangladeshi archer

== Surname ==
- Oladipo Diya (born 1944), Nigerian general
