= Diaa Raofat =

Egyptian footballer (born 1988)

Personal information
- Full name: Diaa Raofat
- Date of birth: December 12, 1988 (age 37)
- Place of birth: Denmark
- Position: Midfielder

Team information
- Current team: Hvidovre IF
- Number: 14

Youth career
- BK Frem

Senior career*
Years	Team	Apps	(Gls)
2007–2008	BK Frem		
2008	Hellerup IK		
2008	BK Avarta	1	(0)
2009	BK Frem	5	(0)
2010–	Hvidovre IF	7	(1)
- * Club domestic league appearances and goals as of June 16, 2010

Diaa Raofat (Arabic: ضياء رفعت) (born December 21, 1988) is an Egyptian professional footballer.

== Football career ==
Raofat plays as a midfielder for BK Avarta, which plays in the Danish 2nd Division East. He previously played for the clubs Boldklubben Frem, Ølstykke FC, and Hellerup IK. Raofat joined BK Avarta in July 2008 with a contract for a year, which ended on June 30, 2009.
