= SS Dia =

History
- Name: Empire Beaconsfield (1943-46); Hawkinge (1946-51); Angusbrae (1951-56); Hispania (1956-60); Dia (1960-64)
- Owner: Ministry of War Transport (1943-46; Constants (South Wales) Ltd (1946-51); Dundee, Perth & London Shipping Co (1951-56); Willem H Müller & Co NV (1956-60); West End Corporation (1960-64)
- Operator: Andrew Weir & Co Ltd (Bank Line) (1943); Constants (South Wales) Ltd (1943-51); Dundee, Perth & London Shipping Co (1951-56); Willem H Müller & Co NV (1956-60); West End Corporation (1960-64)
- Port of registry: (United Kingdom) West Hartlepool (1943-51); (United Kingdom) UK (1951-60); (Netherlands) Rotterdam (1956-60); Panama City (1960-64)
- Builder: William Gray & Co Ltd, West Hartlepool
- Yard number: 1159
- Launched: 2 October 1943
- Completed: November 1943
- Identification: UK Official Number 180066 (Empire Beaconsfield); Code Letters GFMX (Empire Beaconsfield)
- Fate: Sank, 14 October 1964

General characteristics
- Type: Cargo ship
- Tonnage: 2,905 GRT
- Length: 315 ft 4 in (96.11 m)
- Beam: 46 ft 5 in (14.15 m)
- Depth: 23 ft (7.01 m)
- Propulsion: 1 triple expansion steam engine, 281 hp (210 kW)

Location of the sinking of Dia.

SS Dia was a 2,905 GRT cargo ship which was built as Empire Beaconsfield in 1943. She was owned by the Ministry of War Transport (MoWT) and managed by Bank Line Ltd and Constants (South Wales) LTd. Postwar she was sold to her managers and renamed Hawkinge. She later saw service with different owners as Angusbrae, Hispania and Dia. She developed a leak and sank off Savona, Italy on 14 October 1964.

== Career ==
Empire Beaconsfield was built by William Gray & Sons Ltd, West Hartlepool, Co Durham. She was yard number 1159, Empire Beaconsfield was launched on 2 October 1943 and completed in December that year. Empire Beaconsfield was built for the MoWT and placed under the management of Andrew Weir & Co Ltd, trading as the Bank Line. Her port of registry was West Hartlepool.

In 1943, management was transferred from Bank Line to Constants (South Wales) Ltd, Cardiff. In 1946, she was sold to her managers and renamed Hawkinge. In 1951, she was sold to the Dundee, Perth & London Shipping Co and renamed Angusbrae. In 1956, she was sold to Willem H Müller & Co NV, Rotterdam and renamed Hispania. In 1960, she was sold to the West End Corporation, Panama and renamed Dia.

== Sinking ==
On 14 October 1964, Dia developed a leak and sank south of Savona, Italy at 44°12′N 08°38′E.

== Official Numbers and Code Letters ==
Official Numbers were a forerunner to IMO Numbers. Empire Beaconsfield had the UK Official Number 180066 and used the Code Letters GFMX.

== Propulsion ==
The ship was propelled by a triple expansion steam engine which had cylinders of 20 inches (51 cm), 31 inches (79 cm) and 55 inches (140 cm) diameter and 39 inches (99 cm) stroke. It was built by the Central Marine Engineering Works Ltd, West Hartlepool and developed 281 horsepower (210 kW).
