= 2004–05 Primera División (Costa Rica) =

Costa Rican Primera División
- Season: 2004–05
- Champions: –
- Relegated: –
- –: –

Primera División de Costa Rica (Costa Rica First Division) is a Costa Rican football tournament composed of two short tournaments that take up the entire year to determine the champion of Costa Rican football.

== Apertura 2004 ==
=== Group stage ===
Group A

Group A table
Pos	Team	Pld	W	D	L	GF	GA	GD	Pts	Qualification
1	Herediano	16	11	4	1	33	12	+21	37	Qualified to the 2nd round
2	Alajuelense	16	11	3	2	40	16	+24	36	Qualified to the 2nd round
3	Carmelita	16	5	5	6	18	30	−12	20	
4	Ramonense	16	4	3	9	16	27	−11	15	
5	Puntarenas F.C.	16	3	3	10	20	35	−15	12	
6	Liberia	16	2	6	8	18	33	−15	12	

Group B

Group B table
Pos	Team	Pld	W	D	L	GF	GA	GD	Pts	Qualification
1	Saprissa	16	9	3	4	24	16	+8	30	Qualified to the 2nd round
2	Pérez Zeledón	16	8	5	3	28	20	+8	29	Qualified to the 2nd round
3	Cartaginés	16	7	2	7	27	17	+10	23	
4	Brujas F.C.	16	6	3	7	20	19	+1	21	
5	Santos	16	5	6	5	18	24	−6	21	
6	Belén	16	2	3	11	16	29	−13	9	

=== Playoffs ===
Semifinals					Finals
1A	Herediano	1	0	1
2B	Perez Zeledon	0	3	3	Perez Zeledon	0	1	1
1B	Saprissa	1	1	2(4)	Saprissa	0	0	0
2A	Alajuelense	1	1	2(3)

Apertura 2004 winners

== Clausura 2005 ==
=== Group stage ===
Group A

Group A
Pos	Team	Pld	W	D	L	GF	GA	GD	Pts	Qualification
1	Saprissa	16	7	7	2	21	10	+11	28	Qualified to the 2nd round
2	Herediano	16	8	4	4	21	12	+9	28	Qualified to the 2nd round
3	Carmelita	16	8	2	6	27	21	+6	26	
4	Puntarenas F.C.	16	6	5	5	31	24	+7	23	
5	Liberia	16	4	3	9	17	26	−9	15	
6	Ramonense	16	4	3	9	17	27	−10	15	

Group B

Group B
Pos	Team	Pld	W	D	L	GF	GA	GD	Pts	Qualification
1	Alajuelense	16	7	6	3	30	21	+9	27	Qualified to the 2nd round
2	Cartaginés	16	5	9	2	22	19	+3	24	Qualified to the 2nd round
3	Brujas F.C.	16	6	4	6	25	28	−3	22	
4	Pérez Zeledón	16	4	6	6	17	25	−8	18	
5	Belén (R)	16	3	7	6	19	26	−7	16	
6	Santos	16	3	6	7	16	24	−8	15	

(R) Relegated

=== Playoffs ===
Semifinals					Finals
1A	Saprissa	0	2	2
2B	Cartaginés	0	1	1	Saprissa	0	2	2
1B	Alajuelense	1	1	2	Alajuelense	1	2	3
2A	Herediano	1	0	1

Clausura 2005 winners

== Final ==
1st Leg
May 22	Pérez Zeledón	1–3	Alajuelense
2nd Leg
May 29	Alajuelense	1–0	Pérez Zeledón

Primera División de Costa Rica 2004–05

24th title
