= Tidiane Dia =

Senegalese footballer

Personal information
- Full name: Cheikh Tidiane Dia
- Date of birth: 12 April 1985 (age 41)
- Place of birth: Dakar, Senegal
- Height: 1.80 m (5 ft 11 in)
- Position: Striker

Youth career
- Thies FC

Senior career*
Years	Team	Apps	(Gls)
2002–2003	Club Africain		
2003–2009	Valenciennes	36	(3)
2006–2007	→ Pau FC (loan)	22	(5)
2008	→ Paris FC (loan)	9	(0)
2009–2010	GSI Pontivy	9	(1)
- * Club domestic league appearances and goals

Tidiane Dia (born 12 April 1985) is a Senegalese former professional footballer who played as a striker.

== Career ==
In 2006–2007, Dia played for Pau FC, on loan from Paris FC, and in 2008 in Championnat de France amateur for GSI Pontivy.
