= Al Día (Costa Rica) =

Costa Rican newspaper

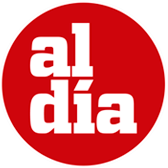

- 21 June 2014 cover, depicting Bryan Ruiz celebrating his goal against Italy at the 2014 FIFA World Cup
- Type: Daily newspaper (early); Daily sports newspaper (later)
- Format: Tabloid
- Owner: Grupo Nación
- Staff writers: Bryan Ruiz
- Ceased publication: 30 November 2014
- Language: Spanish
- Headquarters: San José
- City: San José
- Country: Costa Rica

Al Día was a sport newspaper published in Costa Rica. The paper was part of La Nación Media Group, which also owns La Nacion. Al Día was a national newspaper and had several regional editions. The paper ceased publication on 30 November 2014.
