= Dip (dance move) =

Partner dance move

Dips are common to many partner dance styles (tango, Lindy Hop, salsa, ballroom dances), as well as couple's disco.

Characteristics of a dip include:

- weight-sharing. Usually the follower supports part (or all) of her weight by the supporting leg bent at the knee. The lead frequently uses one foot to point and thus is supporting his weight, and part of the follower's weight, on one bent knee.
- the free leg of the follower is usually straight
- dancers' centres go lower than when standing
- "holding" (pausing) to accentuate the "floor-stopping" move

Some dance styles distinguish between sits, dips, and drops; as a general rule, the difference is the degree to which the base (usually the leader) ends up responsible for the mass and balance of the flyer (usually the follower). Where a distinction is made, it's usually a continuum from least to most responsibility, with sits being the least, drops the most, and dips in between.

Difficulty of the dip moves varies, with some dips being easy, and some requiring "considerable strength and flexibility".

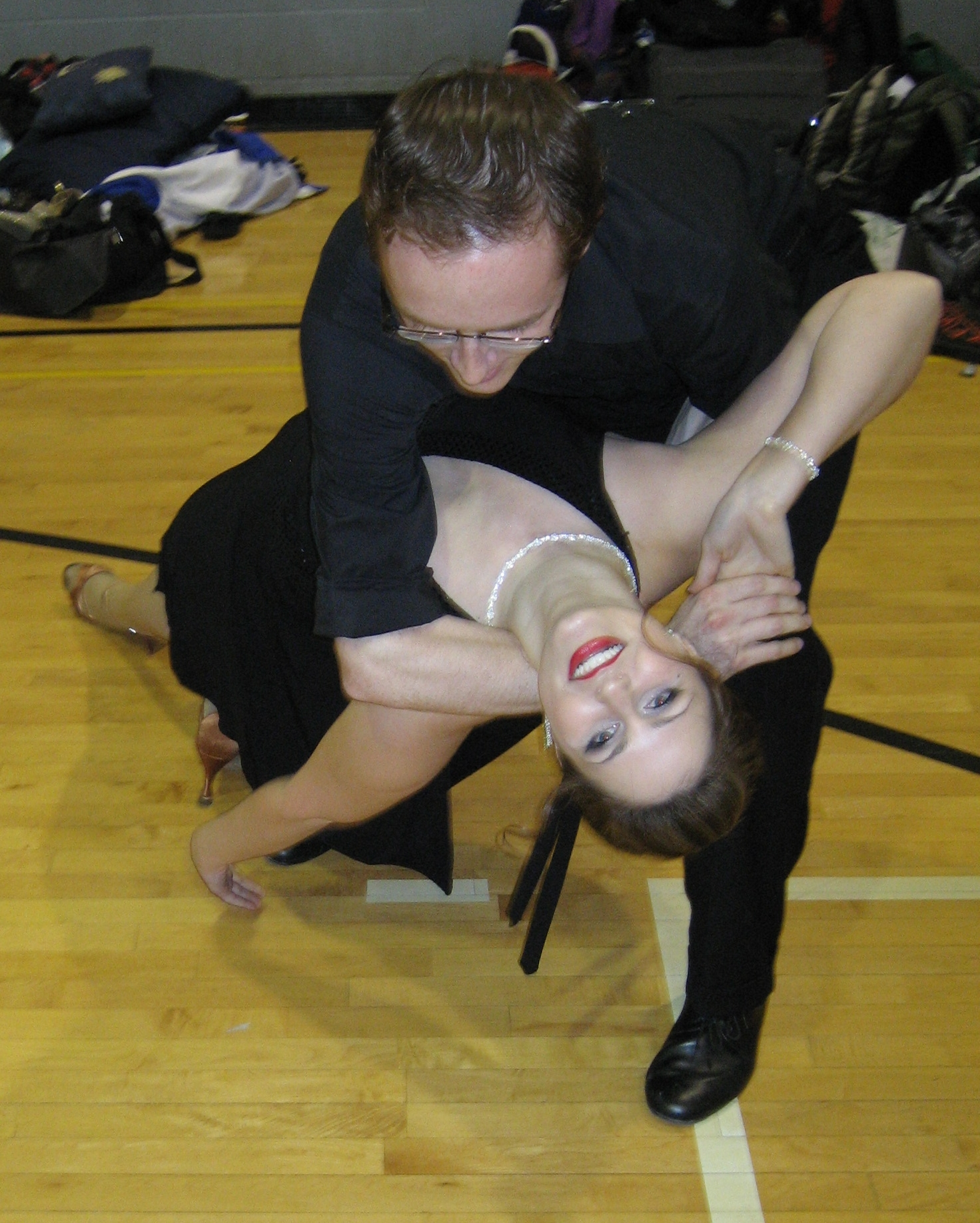
A dip in salsa

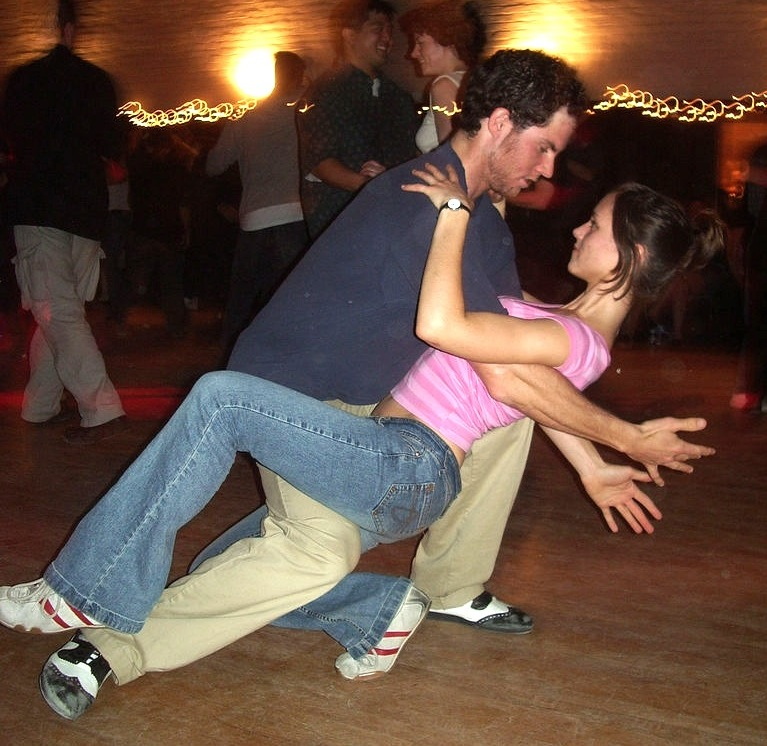
A dip in Lindy Hop

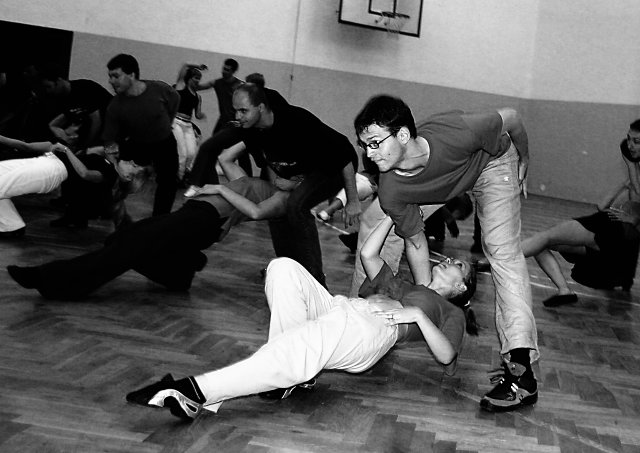
A drop in salsa

== See also ==
- Aerial (dance move)
- Boston dip
- One-Step (the "Dip")
- Slutdrop

== General and cited references ==
- Fallon, Dennis (1980). "Lifts and Dips". The Art of Disco Dancing (PDF). American Alliance for Health, Physical Edunlation, Recreation, and Dance. pp. 142–163.
- Nelson, Tom L. (2008). "Dip". Swing Dance Encyclopedia. AuthorHouse. p. 7.13. ISBN 978-1-4343-5960-5.
