= Toofan (singer) =

Iranian singer (1946–2012)

Toofan Hel-Ataei طوفان هل‌عطایی
- Also known as: Toofan
- Born: Toofan Hel-Ataei; December 16, 1946; Astara, Iran
- Died: June 5, 2012 (aged 65) Cedars-Sinai Medical Center Los Angeles
- Genres: Pop, dance-pop, rock, soft rock
- Occupations: Singer, songwriter
- Instruments: Electric guitar, acoustic guitar, piano
- Years active: 1972–2012
- Labels: Pars Video, Caltex, Taraneh Records, Avang Music
- Website: https://web.archive.org/web/20121210230528/http://www.toofanmusic.com/

Toofan Hel-Ataei Persian: طوفان هل‌‌عطایی (December 16, 1946 – June 5, 2012), known by his stage name Toofan (Persian: طوفان,) was an Iranian composer, musician, and singer based in Los Angeles. The song "Khodaye Asemoonah" is one of his most famous works.

== Early life ==
Toofan Hel-Ataei was born on December 16, 1946, in the city of Astara. As a teenager, he joined the band "Dangers" with his brother Mehrdad, and after a while Toofan became the leader of the band. He then formed another band with Naser Cheshmazar and other friends. During those years, Toofan had collaborated with singers such as Googoosh and Ebi and several other singers.

== Career ==
He was one of the composers who also turned to singing in 1976 and 1977 and gained attention. The famous song "Khodaye Asemoonah" was a product of this period. The peak of Toofan's career coincided with the 1978 revolution. And he could not achieve the fame he wanted. Toofan is survived by two children, Ramin and Yashar.

== Illness and death ==
In mid-2011, Toofan announced his lung cancer diagnosis, and artists tried to help him with their donations during his treatment. Iranian singer Andranik Madadian said at Toofan's funeral: "The year we found out that Toofan was sick, the pop music world turned upside down, and since then we have all been trying to get him better. But it didn't work." Toofan died on June 5, 2012, at Cedars-Sinai Medical Center in Los Angeles, due to serious lung cancer, at the age of 65. His body was buried the next day at Valley Oaks Cemetery in West Lake Village, California, next to his old colleagues, Vigan, and Jahan, by artists who attended his funeral.
