= 2006 FIFA World Cup qualification – CONCACAF fourth round =

In the fourth round of the CONCACAF 2006 World Cup qualification, the six remaining teams from the third round were put in a single group, and played against each other home-and-away. The three teams with most points qualified for the 2006 FIFA World Cup. The fourth-placed team, Trinidad and Tobago, advanced to the AFC-CONCACAF playoff against the winner of the fourth round of Asia, Bahrain.

== Standings ==
Pos	Team	Pld	W	D	L	GF	GA	GD	Pts	Qualification	(United States)	(Mexico)	(Costa Rica)	(Trinidad and Tobago)	(Guatemala)	(Panama)
1	United States	10	7	1	2	16	6	+10	22 (Note: Tied on head-to-head points (3). Head-to-head goal difference: United States +1, Mexico −1.)	2006 FIFA World Cup	—	2–0	3–0	1–0	2–0	2–0
2	Mexico	10	7	1	2	22	9	+13	22	2006 FIFA World Cup	2–1	—	2–0	2–0	5–2	5–0
3	Costa Rica	10	5	1	4	15	14	+1	16	2006 FIFA World Cup	3–0	1–2	—	2–0	3–2	2–1
4	Trinidad and Tobago	10	4	1	5	10	15	−5	13	Inter-confederation play-offs	1–2	2–1	0–0	—	3–2	2–0
5	Guatemala	10	3	2	5	16	18	−2	11		0–0	0–2	3–1	5–1	—	2–1
6	Panama	10	0	2	8	4	21	−17	2		0–3	1–1	1–3	0–1	0–0	—

== Matches ==
February 9, 2005

Costa Rica	1–2	Mexico
Wanchope 38'	Report	Lozano 8', 10'

Estadio Ricardo Saprissa
San José, Costa Rica
Attendance: 22,000
Referee: Carlos Batres (Guatemala)
February 9, 2005

Panama	0–0	Guatemala
	Report

Estadio Rommel Fernández
Panama City, Panama
Attendance: 20,000
Referee: Peter Prendergast (Jamaica)
February 9, 2005

Trinidad and Tobago	1–2	United States
Eve 89'	Report	Johnson 30'; Lewis 54'

Queen's Park Oval
Port of Spain, Trinidad and Tobago
Attendance: 11,000
Referee: Benito Archundia (Mexico)

March 26, 2005

Guatemala	5–1	Trinidad and Tobago
Ramírez 17'; Ruiz 30', 38'; Pezzarossi 78', 87'	Report	Edwards 32'

Estadio Mateo Flores
Guatemala City, Guatemala
Attendance: 22,506
Referee: Kevin Stott (United States)
March 26, 2005

Costa Rica	2–1	Panama
Wilson 40' (pen.); Myrie 90+1'	Report	Brown 58' (pen.)

Estadio Ricardo Saprissa
San José, Costa Rica
Attendance: 8,000
Referee: Marco Rodríguez (Mexico)
March 27, 2005

Mexico	2–1	United States
Borgetti 30'; Sinha 33'	Report	Lewis 59'

Estadio Azteca
Mexico City, Mexico
Attendance: 110,000
Referee: Rodolfo Sibrian (El Salvador)

March 30, 2005

Panama	1–1	Mexico
Tejada 75'	Report	Morales 26'

Estadio Rommel Fernández
Panama City, Panama
Attendance: 13,000
Referee: Jose Pineda (Honduras)
March 30, 2005

United States	2–0	Guatemala
Johnson 11'; Ralston 68'	Report

Legion Field
Birmingham, Alabama, United States
Attendance: 31,624
Referee: Ramesh Ramdhan (Trinidad & Tobago)
March 30, 2005

Trinidad and Tobago	0–0	Costa Rica
	Report

Hasely Crawford Stadium
Port of Spain, Trinidad and Tobago
Attendance: 8,000
Referee: Mauricio Navarro (Canada)

June 4, 2005

Trinidad and Tobago	2–0	Panama
John 34'; Lawrence 71'	Report

Hasely Crawford Stadium
Port of Spain, Trinidad and Tobago
Attendance: 18,000
Referee: Peter Prendergast (Jamaica)
June 4, 2005

United States	3–0	Costa Rica
Donovan 6', 62'; McBride 87'	Report

Rice-Eccles Stadium
Salt Lake City, United States
Attendance: 40,586
Referee: Carlos Batres (Guatemala))
June 4, 2005

Guatemala	0–2	Mexico
	Report	Sinha 41'; Cabrera 45' (o.g.)

Estadio Mateo Flores
Guatemala City, Guatemala
Attendance: 26,723
Referee: Brian Hall (United States)

June 8, 2005

Costa Rica	3–2	Guatemala
Hernández 34'; Gomez 65'; Wanchope 90+2'	Report	Villatoro 74'; Rodríguez 77'

Estadio Ricardo Saprissa
San José, Costa Rica
Attendance: 10,500
Referee: Benito Archundia (Mexico)
June 8, 2005

Panama	0–3	United States
	Report	Bocanegra 6'; Donovan 20'; McBride 40'

Estadio Rommel Fernández
Panama City, Panama
Attendance: 17,000
Referee: Mauricio Navarro (Canada)
June 8, 2005

Mexico	2–0	Trinidad and Tobago
Borgetti 63'; Pérez 88'	Report

Estadio Universitario
San Nicolás de los Garza, Mexico
Attendance: 32,833
Referee: Kevin Stott (United States)

August 17, 2005

Mexico	2–0	Costa Rica
Borgetti 63'; Fonseca 86'	Report

Estadio Azteca
Mexico City, Mexico
Attendance: 27,000
Referee: Jose Pineda (Honduras)
August 17, 2005

United States	1–0	Trinidad and Tobago
McBride 2'	Report

Rentschler Field
East Hartford, Connecticut, United States
Attendance: 25,488
Referee: Marco Rodríguez (Mexico)
August 17, 2005

Guatemala	2–1	Panama
Baloy 70' (o.g.); Romero 90+3'	Report	Valdés 19'

Estadio Mateo Flores
Guatemala City, Guatemala
Attendance: 24,000
Referee: Rodolfo Sibrian (El Salvador)

September 3, 2005

Panama	1–3	Costa Rica
Tejada 90'	Report	Saborio 44'; Centeno 51'; Gomez 73'

Estadio Rommel Fernández
Panama City, Panama
Attendance: 21,000
Referee: Kevin Stott (United States)
September 3, 2005

Trinidad and Tobago	3–2	Guatemala
Latapy 48'; John 85', 86'	Report	Andrews 3' (o.g.); Romero 61'

Hasely Crawford Stadium
Port of Spain, Trinidad and Tobago
Attendance: 15,000
Referee: Benito Archundia (Mexico)
September 3, 2005

United States	2–0	Mexico
Ralston 53'; Beasley 58'	Report

Columbus Crew Stadium
Columbus, Ohio, United States
Attendance: 24,685
Referee: Carlos Batres (Guatemala)

September 7, 2005

Costa Rica	2–0	Trinidad and Tobago
Saborio 15'; Centeno 50'	Report

Estadio Ricardo Saprissa
San José, Costa Rica
Attendance: 17,000
Referee: Carlos Batres (Guatemala)
September 7, 2005

Mexico	5–0	Panama
Pérez 31'; Márquez 54'; Borgetti 59'; Fonseca 75'; Pardo 76'	Report

Estadio Azteca
Mexico City, Mexico
Attendance: 40,000
Referee: Brian Hall (United States)
September 7, 2005

Guatemala	0–0	United States
	Report

Estadio Mateo Flores
Guatemala City, Guatemala
Attendance: 27,000
Referee: Marco Rodríguez (Mexico)

October 8, 2005

Costa Rica	3–0	United States
Wanchope 34'; Hernández 60', 88'	Report

Estadio Ricardo Saprissa
San José, Costa Rica
Attendance: 30,000
Referee: Benito Archundia (Mexico)
October 8, 2005

Mexico	5–2	Guatemala
Franco 19'; Fonseca 48', 51', 62', 66'	Report	Ruiz 1'; S. Ponciano 53'

Estadio Alfonso Lastras
San Luis Potosí, Mexico
Attendance: 30,000
Referee: Peter Prendergast (Jamaica)
October 8, 2005

Panama	0–1	Trinidad and Tobago
	Report	John 61'

Estadio Rommel Fernández
Panama City, Panama
Attendance: 1,000
Referee: Mauricio Navarro (Canada)

October 12, 2005

United States	2–0	Panama
Martino 51'; Twellman 57'	Report

Gillette Stadium
Foxboro, Massachusetts, United States
Attendance: 9,192
Referee: Gilberto Alcalá (Mexico)
October 12, 2005

Trinidad and Tobago	2–1	Mexico
John 43', 69'	Report	Lozano 38'

Hasely Crawford Stadium
Port of Spain, Trinidad & Tobago
Attendance: 23,000
Referee: Jose Pineda (Honduras)
October 12, 2005

Guatemala	3–1	Costa Rica
É. Ponciano 2'; García 16'; Ruiz 30'	Report	Myrie 60'

Estadio Mateo Flores
Guatemala City, Guatemala
Attendance: 23,912
Referee: Brian Hall (United States)

== Goalscorers ==
There were 83 goals scored in 30 matches, for an average of 2.77 goals per match.

6 goals

- (Mexico) Francisco Fonseca
- (Trinidad and Tobago) Stern John

4 goals

- (Guatemala) Carlos Ruiz
- (Mexico) Jared Borgetti

3 goals

- (Costa Rica) Carlos Hernández
- (Costa Rica) Paulo Wanchope
- (Mexico) Jaime Lozano
- (United States) Landon Donovan
- (United States) Brian McBride

2 goals

- (Costa Rica) Walter Centeno
- (Costa Rica) Rónald Gómez
- (Costa Rica) Roy Myrie
- (Costa Rica) Álvaro Saborío
- (Guatemala) Dwight Pezzarossi
- (Guatemala) Gonzalo Romero
- (Mexico) Luis Ernesto Pérez
- (Mexico) Sinha
- (Panama) Luis Tejada
- (United States) Eddie Johnson
- (United States) Eddie Lewis
- (United States) Steve Ralston

1 goal

- (Costa Rica) Whayne Wilson
- (Guatemala) Freddy García
- (Guatemala) Élmer Ponciano
- (Guatemala) Selvyn Ponciano
- (Guatemala) Guillermo Ramírez
- (Guatemala) Mario Rodríguez
- (Guatemala) Edwin Villatoro
- (Mexico) Guillermo Franco
- (Mexico) Rafael Márquez
- (Mexico) Ramon Morales
- (Mexico) Pável Pardo
- (Panama) Roberto Brown
- (Panama) Julio Dely Valdés
- (Trinidad and Tobago) Carlos Edwards
- (Trinidad and Tobago) Angus Eve
- (Trinidad and Tobago) Russell Latapy
- (Trinidad and Tobago) Dennis Lawrence
- (United States) DaMarcus Beasley
- (United States) Carlos Bocanegra
- (United States) Kyle Martino
- (United States) Taylor Twellman

1 own goal

- (Guatemala) Gustavo Cabrera (against Mexico)
- (Panama) Felipe Baloy (against Guatemala)
- (Trinidad and Tobago) Marvin Andrews (against Guatemala)
