= 2008–09 in Guatemalan football =

Football in Guatemala
- Season: 2008–09

The following article presents a summary of the 2008–09 football season in Guatemala.

== National leagues ==
=== Liga Nacional ===
- Apertura champion: Comunicaciones (22nd title).
  - Top scorer: Adrián Apellaniz (10).
- Clausura champion: Jalapa (2nd title).
  - Top scorer: Carlos González (10).
- International qualifiers:
  - 2009–10 CONCACAF Champions League: Comunicaciones, Jalapa.
- Relegated: Petapa.

Source: RSSSF

=== Primera División de Ascenso ===
- Apertura champion: San Pedro (1st title).
- Clausura champion: Juventud Retalteca (1st title).
- Promoted: USAC, Peñarol La Mesilla, Juventud Retalteca.
- Relegated: La Gomera, Sanarate, Amatitlán.

Source: RSSSF

== National team ==
This section covers the Guatemala national team matches from the beginning of June 2008 until the end of June 2009.

The Guatemala national team played the entirety of its 2010 World Cup qualification campaign from June 2008 to November 2008, being eliminated in the third round of the CONCACAF region as third place in its group.

Date	Venue	Opponents	Score	Comp	Guatemala scorers	Match Report(s)
June 4, 2008	Estadio Playa Ancha; Valparaíso, Chile	Chile	2 – 0	F		Report
June 14, 2008	Estadio Mateo Flores; Guatemala City, Guatemala	Saint Lucia	6 – 0	WCQ2010	Rodríguez 6'; Ruíz 36' 40' 58' 90+3'; Trigueros 90+1'	Report
June 21, 2008	Los Angeles Memorial Coliseum; Los Angeles, United States	Saint Lucia	1 – 3	WCQ2010	Romero 24' 43'; Trigueros 86'	Report
August 6, 2008	RFK Stadium; Washington, D.C., United States	Bolivia	0 – 3	F	Pezzarossi 52'; Ramírez 58'; Rodríguez 67'	Report
August 20, 2008	Estadio Mateo Flores; Guatemala City, Guatemala	United States	0 – 1	WCQ2010		Report
September 6, 2008	Hasely Crawford Stadium; Port of Spain, Trinidad and Tobago	Trinidad and Tobago	1 – 1	WCQ2010	Gallardo 90+2'	Report
September 10, 2008	Estadio Mateo Flores; Guatemala City, Guatemala	Cuba	4 – 1	WCQ2010	Ruíz 37' 54'; Rodríguez 85'; Contreras 90'	Report
October 11, 2008	Estadio Mateo Flores; Guatemala City, Guatemala	Trinidad and Tobago	0 – 0	WCQ2010		Report
October 15, 2008	Estadio Pedro Marrero; Havana, Cuba	Cuba	2 – 1	WCQ2010	Pappa 80'	Report
November 19, 2008	Dick's Sporting Goods Park; Commerce City, United States	United States	2 – 0	WCQ2010		Report
January 25, 2009	Estadio Tiburcio Carías Andino; Tegucigalpa, Honduras	Costa Rica	1 – 3	UNCAF 2009	López 51'	Report
January 27, 2009	Estadio Tiburcio Carías Andino; Tegucigalpa, Honduras	Panama	1 – 0	UNCAF 2009		Report
January 29, 2009	Estadio Tiburcio Carías Andino; Tegucigalpa, Honduras	Nicaragua	2 – 0	UNCAF 2009		Report
February 11, 2009	Estadio Monumental de Maturín; Maturín, Venezuela	Venezuela	2 – 1	F	Pezzarossi 49'	Report
June 28, 2009	Qualcomm Stadium; San Diego, United States	Mexico	0 – 0	F		Report
June 30, 2009	Oxnard College; Oxnard, California, United States	Canada	3 – 0	F		Report

KEY: F = Friendly match; WCQ2010 = 2010 FIFA World Cup qualification; UNCAF 2009 = UNCAF Nations Cup 2009

== See also ==
- Liga Nacional de Fútbol de Guatemala
- Primera División de Ascenso
- Liga Nacional de Guatemala 2008–09
- Guatemala national football team
