= Gustavo Cabrera =

Gustavo Cabrera may refer to:

- Gustavo Cabrera Acevedo, Mexican demographer laureated with the National Prize for Demography (1981), member of Colegio Nacional (Mexico)
- Gustavo Adolfo Cabrera, Guatemalan footballer
