= Edy Cabrera =

Guatemalan footballer

Personal information
- Full name: Edy Alberto Cabrera Marroquín
- Date of birth: 14 August 1976 (age 50)
- Place of birth: Santo Tomás, Guatemala
- Height: 1.78 m (5 ft 10 in)
- Position: Defender

Youth career
- Juca de Izabal

Senior career*
Years	Team	Apps	(Gls)
1995–2000	Comunicaciones		
2001–2005	Cobán Imperial	70	(3)
2005–2006	Jalapa	28	(0)
2007	Comunicaciones	8	(0)
2007–2009	Jalapa		
2009–2010	Juventud Retalteca		
2010	Malacateco		

International career^{‡}
2000–2004	Guatemala	6	(0)
- * Club domestic league appearances and goals as of 20 March 2007 ‡ National team caps and goals as of 31 January 2010

Edy Alberto Cabrera Marroquín (born 14 August 1977) is a Guatemalan former professional footballer who played as a defender.

== Club career ==
Cabrera is the older brother of national team stalwart Gustavo and both started playing football at JuCa de Izabal before moving to Guatemalan giants Comunicaciones. The brothers were separated when Edy joined Cobán Imperial. He later moved on to Deportivo Jalapa and had a second, short, spell at Comunicaciones before joining Juventud Retalteca in 2009.

== International career ==
Cabrera made his debut for Guatemala as a late substitute in a January 2000 friendly match against Panama and earned a total of 6 caps, scoring no goals. He has represented his country in 2 FIFA World Cup qualification matches.
