= 2006 FIFA World Cup qualification (CONCACAF) =

Tournament details
- Dates: 18 February 2004 – 12 October 2005
- Teams: 34 (from 1 confederation)

Tournament statistics
- Matches played: 110
- Goals scored: 377 (3.43 per match)
- Attendance: 1,669,098 (15,174 per match)
- Top scorer(s): (Mexico) Jared Borgetti (14 goals)

Listed below are the dates and results for the 2006 FIFA World Cup qualification rounds for North, Central America and the Caribbean. A total of 34 teams took part (out of 35 eligible – only Puerto Rico declined to participate), competing for 3.5 places in the World Cup.

The qualification process was divided in four stages. In the first stage, the 34 teams were divided in 10 groups of three teams each and two groups of two teams each. Groups with three teams had two rounds, with the best ranked team according to FIFA in each group entering the competition in the second round. In each group, teams were paired 2-by-2 and played home-and-away matches.

The 12 winners of the second stage advanced to the third stage, where they were divided into three groups of four teams each. Teams in each group would play against each other home-and-away, and the two teams with most points in each group would advance to the final round.

In the fourth stage, the six teams were put in a single group, and played against each other home-and-away. The three teams with most points qualified to the World Cup. The fourth placed team advanced to the AFC–CONCACAF play-off against the winner of a play-off between third placed teams in the third round of Asia.

== Format ==
The first and second rounds reduced the 34 entrants to 24 and 12 teams, respectively. The remaining 12 teams were then placed into three third round groups of four, with the top two teams in each group advancing to the fourth and final qualification group. The third round began in August 2004 and ended in November 2004. The top three teams from the fourth round group of six (held from February 2005 to October 2005) qualified for the 2006 FIFA World Cup. The fourth-placed team competed in a home-and-away play-off against the fifth-placed team from Asia.

== First round ==
Team 1	Agg.	Team 2	1st leg	2nd leg
Grenada	8–1	Guyana	5–0	3–1
Bermuda	20–0	Montserrat	13–0	7–0
Haiti	7–0	Turks and Caicos Islands	5–0	2–0
British Virgin Islands	0–10	Saint Lucia	0–1	0–9
Cayman Islands	1–5	Cuba	1–2	0–3
Aruba	2–10	Suriname	1–2	1–8
Antigua and Barbuda	2–3	Netherlands Antilles	2–0	0–3
Dominica	4–2	Bahamas	1–1	3–1
U.S. Virgin Islands	0–11	Saint Kitts and Nevis	0–4	0–7
Dominican Republic	6–0	Anguilla	0–0	6–0

== Second round ==
Team 1	Agg.	Team 2	1st leg	2nd leg
United States	6–2	Grenada	3–0	3–2
El Salvador	4–3	Bermuda	2–1	2–2
Haiti	1–4	Jamaica	1–1	0–3
Panama	7–0	Saint Lucia	4–0	3–0
Cuba	3–3 (a)	Costa Rica	2–2	1–1
Suriname	2–4	Guatemala	1–1	1–3
Netherlands Antilles	1–6	Honduras	1–2	0–4
Canada	8–0	Belize	4–0	4–0
Dominica	0–18	Mexico	0–10	0–8
Barbados	2–5	Saint Kitts and Nevis	0–2	2–3
Dominican Republic	0–6	Trinidad and Tobago	0–2	0–4
Nicaragua	3–6	Saint Vincent and the Grenadines	2–2	1–4

== Third round ==
=== Group 1 ===
Team	Pld	W	D	L	GF	GA	GD	Pts	Qualification	(United States)	(Panama)	(Jamaica)	(El Salvador)
United States	6	3	3	0	13	3	+10	12	Fourth round	—	6–0	1–1	2–0
Panama	6	2	2	2	8	11	−3	8	Fourth round	1–1	—	1–1	3–0
Jamaica	6	1	4	1	7	5	+2	7		1–1	1–2	—	0–0
El Salvador	6	1	1	4	2	11	−9	4		0–2	2–1	0–3	—

=== Group 2 ===
Team	Pld	W	D	L	GF	GA	GD	Pts	Qualification	(Costa Rica)	(Guatemala)	(Honduras)	(Canada)
Costa Rica	6	3	1	2	12	8	+4	10	Fourth round	—	5–0	2–5	1–0
Guatemala	6	3	1	2	7	9	−2	10	Fourth round	2–1	—	1–0	0–1
Honduras	6	1	4	1	9	7	+2	7		0–0	2–2	—	1–1
Canada	6	1	2	3	4	8	−4	5		1–3	0–2	1–1	—

=== Group 3 ===
Team	Pld	W	D	L	GF	GA	GD	Pts	Qualification	(Mexico)	(Trinidad and Tobago)	(Saint Vincent and the Grenadines)	(Saint Kitts and Nevis)
Mexico	6	6	0	0	27	1	+26	18	Fourth round	—	3–0	7–0	8–0
Trinidad and Tobago	6	4	0	2	12	9	+3	12	Fourth round	1–3	—	2–1	5–1
Saint Vincent and the Grenadines	6	2	0	4	5	12	−7	6		0–1	0–2	—	1–0
Saint Kitts and Nevis	6	0	0	6	2	24	−22	0		0–5	1–2	0–3	—

== Fourth round ==
Pos	Team	Pld	W	D	L	GF	GA	GD	Pts	Qualification	(United States)	(Mexico)	(Costa Rica)	(Trinidad and Tobago)	(Guatemala)	(Panama)
1	United States	10	7	1	2	16	6	+10	22 (Note: Tied on head-to-head points (3). Head-to-head goal difference: United States +1, Mexico −1.)	2006 FIFA World Cup	—	2–0	3–0	1–0	2–0	2–0
2	Mexico	10	7	1	2	22	9	+13	22	2006 FIFA World Cup	2–1	—	2–0	2–0	5–2	5–0
3	Costa Rica	10	5	1	4	15	14	+1	16	2006 FIFA World Cup	3–0	1–2	—	2–0	3–2	2–1
4	Trinidad and Tobago	10	4	1	5	10	15	−5	13	Inter-confederation play-offs	1–2	2–1	0–0	—	3–2	2–0
5	Guatemala	10	3	2	5	16	18	−2	11		0–0	0–2	3–1	5–1	—	2–1
6	Panama	10	0	2	8	4	21	−17	2		0–3	1–1	1–3	0–1	0–0	—

== Inter-confederation play-offs ==
The Fourth Round fourth-placed team then played the fifth-placed team of the AFC qualifying group, Bahrain, in a home-and-away play-off. The winner of this play-off qualified for the 2006 FIFA World Cup finals.

Team 1	Agg.	Team 2	1st leg	2nd leg
Trinidad and Tobago	2–1	Bahrain	1–1	1–0

== Qualified teams ==
The following four teams from CONCACAF qualified for the final tournament.

Team	Qualified as	Qualified on	Previous appearances in FIFA World Cup^{1}
United States	fourth round winners	3 September 2005	7 (1930, 1934, 1950, 1990, 1994, 1998, 2002)
Mexico	fourth round runners-up	7 September 2005	12 (1930, 1950, 1954, 1958, 1962, 1966, 1970, 1978, 1986, 1994, 1998, 2002)
Costa Rica	fourth round third place	8 October 2005	2 (1990, 2002)
Trinidad and Tobago	CONCACAF-AFC play-off winners	16 November 2005	0 (debut)

^{1} Bold indicates champions for that year. Italic indicates hosts for that year.

== Top goalscorers ==
There were 377 goals scored in 110 matches, for an average of 3.43 goals per match.

14 goals

- (Mexico national football team) Jared Borgetti

12 goals

- (Trinidad and Tobago national football team) Stern John

11 goals

- (Mexico national football team) Jaime Lozano

10 goals

- (Guatemala national football team) Carlos Ruiz
- (Mexico national football team) Francisco Fonseca

8 goals

- (Costa Rica national football team) Paulo Wanchope

7 goals

- (Bermuda national football team) John Barry Nusum
- (Saint Kitts and Nevis national football team) Ian Lake
- (United States men's national soccer team) Landon Donovan
- (United States men's national soccer team) Eddie Johnson

6 goals

- (Cuba national football team) Lester Moré
- (Jamaica national football team) Marlon King
- (Panama national football team) Roberto Brown

Below are full goalscorer lists for each round:

- First round
- Second round
- Third round
- Fourth round
