= 2008–09 Liga Nacional de Guatemala =

56th professional season of the top-flight football league in Guatemala

Liga Nacional de Guatemala
- Season: 2008–09
- Dates: 26 July 2008 – 14 June 2009
- Champions: Apertura: Comunicaciones (22nd title); Clausura: Jalapa (2nd title)
- Relegated: Petapa
- CONCACAF Champions League: Comunicaciones; Jalapa
- Top goalscorer: Apertura: Adrián Apellaniz (10); Clausura: Carlos González (10); Season: Carlos Castillo (16)

The 2008–09 Liga Nacional de Guatemala was the 56th professional season of the top-flight football league in Guatemala. The season was divided into two championships—the 2008 Apertura and the 2009 Clausura—each in an identical format and each contested by the same 12 teams.

The first six clubs in the standings at the end of each competition participate in the playoffs (a two-leg knock-out phase) to determine the champion; the first and second place teams qualify directly to the semi-finals, while the other two have to play in the quarter-finals. The winners of the Apertura and Clausura tournaments participate in the 2009–10 CONCACAF Champions League.

== Apertura ==
Final standings
Pos	Team	Pld	W	D	L	GF	GA	GD	Pts	Qualification
1	Municipal	18	7	8	3	29	18	+11	29	Qualified to the playoffs semifinals.
2	Comunicaciones	18	7	8	3	27	23	+4	29	Qualified to the playoffs semifinals.
3	Zacapa	18	8	4	6	21	17	+4	28	Qualified to the playoffs quarterfinals.
4	Xelajú	18	7	7	4	23	20	+3	28	Qualified to the playoffs quarterfinals.
5	Marquense	18	7	3	8	22	27	−5	24	Qualified to the playoffs quarterfinals.
6	Xinabajul	18	5	8	5	20	27	−7	23	Qualified to the playoffs quarterfinals.
7	Heredia	18	6	3	9	23	24	−1	21	
8	Petapa	18	6	3	9	16	20	−4	21	
9	Suchitepéquez	18	4	8	6	31	29	+2	20	
10	Jalapa	18	4	6	8	17	24	−7	18	

Source: League Stats (in Spanish)

=== Top scorers ===
Position	Player	Team	Goals
1	(Uruguay) Adrián Apellaniz	Comunicaciones	10
2	(Chile) Fabián Muñoz	Zacapa	9
2	(Uruguay) Gastón Linares	Heredia	9
2	(Guatemala) Carlos Castillo	Suchitepéquez	9
5	(Costa Rica) Rolando Fonseca	Comunicaciones	7
5	(Costa Rica) Jhonny Cubero	Xelajú	7
7	(Honduras) Francisco Pavón	Xelajú	6
7	(Guatemala) Jorge Estrada	Marquense	6

Final Update: December 1, 2008.

=== Results ===
Home \ Away	COM	HER	JAL	MAR	MUN	PET	SUC	XEL	XIN	ZAC
Comunicaciones		3–3	2–1	2–0	0–3	2–1	3–2	1–1	2–2	0–2
Heredia	2–2		2–0	0–1	1–2	2–1	2–1	2–0	2–0	2–0
Jalapa	0–2	1–0		3–0	0–0	1–0	1–1	1–1	2–2	1–0
Marquense	1–2	2–1	3–0		1–1	1–2	3–2	3–4	1–0	1–0
Municipal	0–0	3–1	5–4	1–1		2–0	3–2	1–1	0–1	4–0
Petapa	0–0	2–1	1–0	1–0	1–1		1–2	2–0	1–0	0–1
Suchitepéquez	2–2	1–1	1–1	1–2	1–1	3–1		1–1	2–0	3–0
Xelajú	1–3	2–0	2–0	2–0	1–0	2–1	3–2		2–2	0–0
Xinabajul	1–0	2–1	1–1	2–2	2–1	1–1	2–2	0–0		2–1
Zacapa	1–1	1–0	1–0	3–0	1–1	1–0	2–2	1–0	6–0	

Legend: Blue = home team win; Yellow = draw; Red = away team win.

Colors: Blue = home team win; White = draw; Red = away team win.

=== Playoffs ===
Quarterfinals; Dec. 3-7
3	Zacapa	0	0	0
6	Xinabajul	1	1	2
4	Xelajú	3	3	6
5	Marquense	2	3	5

Semifinals; Dec. 10-14
1	Municipal	2	2	4
6	Xinabajul	1	1	2
2	Comunicaciones	0	5	5
4	Xelajú	1	2	3

Finals; Dec. 17-21
1	Municipal	1	1	2
2	Comunicaciones	2	1	3

Comunicaciones as tournament champion qualified to the 2009–10 CONCACAF Champions League.

2008 Apertura winner
Comunicaciones
22nd title

== Clausura ==
Final standings
Pos	Team	Pld	W	D	L	GF	GA	GD	Pts	Qualification
1	Municipal	18	9	5	4	26	13	+13	32	Qualified to the playoffs semifinals.
2	Heredia	18	9	2	7	26	24	+2	29	Qualified to the playoffs semifinals.
3	Jalapa	18	7	7	4	17	13	+4	28	Qualified to the playoffs quarterfinals.
4	Suchitepéquez	18	7	6	5	25	23	+2	27	Qualified to the playoffs quarterfinals.
5	Xelajú	18	6	9	3	18	16	+2	27	Qualified to the playoffs quarterfinals.
6	Comunicaciones	18	6	5	7	25	22	+3	23	Qualified to the playoffs quarterfinals.
7	Xinabajul	18	6	5	7	24	26	−2	23	
8	Marquense	18	4	7	7	15	22	−7	19	
9	Petapa	18	3	7	8	22	30	−8	16	
10	Zacapa	18	3	7	8	14	23	−9	16	

Source: RSSSF

=== Top scorers ===
Position	Player	Team	Goals
1	(Paraguay) Carlos González	Municipal	10
2	(Colombia) Carlos Asprilla	Petapa	8
2	(Guatemala) Walter Estrada	Xinabajul	8
4	(Guatemala) Carlos Castillo	Suchitepéquez	7
4	(Paraguay) Carlos Leguizamón	Suchitepéquez	7
6	(Brazil) Evandro Ferreira	Heredia	6
6	(Guatemala) Mario Castellanos	Heredia	6

=== Results ===
Home \ Away	COM	HER	JAL	MAR	MUN	PET	SUC	XEL	XIN	ZAC
Comunicaciones		1–2	0–2	0–0	1–0	1–0	1–2	0–1	3–1	1–1
Heredia	0–0		3–1	4–1	0–3	3–2	2–0	1–1	2–0	1–0
Jalapa	2–1	1–0		0–0	2–0	2–1	0–0	0–0	1–0	2–0
Marquense	2–2	1–0	1–0		0–0	2–1	0–0	0–0	3–2	0–2
Municipal	2–3	2–0	1–1	1–0		3–2	4–0	2–1	0–0	2–1
Petapa	0–3	2–1	1–1	4–2	1–1		3–3	1–1	1–1	2–0
Suchitepéquez	1–1	2–4	2–0	2–1	0–0	3–0		1–0	4–3	4–0
Xelajú	3–2	3–2	1–1	1–0	1–0	0–0	0–0		1–1	2–1
Xinabajul	3–2	0–1	2–1	3–2	0–2	3–1	1–0	3–1		0–0
Zacapa	1–2	4–0	0–0	0–0	0–3	0–0	3–1	1–1	1–1	

Legend: Blue = home team win; Yellow = draw; Red = away team win.

Colors: Blue = home team win; White = draw; Red = away team win.

=== Playoffs ===
Quarterfinals; 1st leg: May 27/28 – 2nd leg: May 30/31
3	Jalapa	1	3	4
6	Comunicaciones	0	0	0
4	Suchitepéquez	1	4	5
5	Xelajú	3	0	3

Semifinals; 1st leg: June 4 – 2nd leg: June 7
2	Heredia	0	2	2
3	Jalapa	1	2	3
1	Municipal (aet)	0	2 (1)	3
4	Suchitepéquez	2	0 (0)	2

Finals; 1st leg: June 11 – 2nd leg: June 14
3	Jalapa	3	1	4
1	Municipal	1	0	1

Jalapa as tournament champion qualified to the 2009–10 CONCACAF Champions League.

2009 Clausura winner
Jalapa
2nd title

=== Relegation ===
At the end of the season, the 10th placed team (the team with the fewest points) in the aggregate table standings (the combined standings of both the Apertura and Clausura tournaments) is relegated to the second division automatically at the end of the Clausura tournament.

==== Aggregate table ====
Final standings
Pos	Team	Pld	W	D	L	GF	GA	GD	Pts	Relegation
1	Municipal	36	16	13	7	55	31	+24	61	
2	Xelajú	36	13	16	7	41	36	+5	55	
3	Comunicaciones	36	13	13	10	52	45	+7	52	
4	Heredia	36	15	5	16	49	48	+1	50	
5	Suchitepéquez	36	11	14	11	56	52	+4	47	
6	Jalapa	36	11	13	12	34	37	−3	46	
7	Xinabajul	36	11	13	12	44	53	−9	46	
8	Zacapa	36	11	11	14	35	40	−5	44	
9	Marquense	36	11	10	15	37	49	−12	43	
10	Petapa (R)	36	9	10	17	38	50	−12	37	Relegated to the First division

(R) Relegated

== See also ==
- Liga Nacional de Guatemala
- 2008–09 in Guatemalan football
