= Élmer Ponciano =

Guatemalan footballer

Personal information
- Full name: Élmer Ramón Ponciano Priego
- Date of birth: June 28, 1978 (age 48)
- Place of birth: Guatemala City, Guatemala
- Height: 1.70 m (5 ft 7 in)
- Position: Defender

Team information
- Current team: USAC

Senior career*
| Years | Team | Apps | (Gls) |
| 2000–2001 | Antigua GFC | | |
| 2001–2002 | Comunicaciones | | |
| 2002–2004 | Juventud Retalteca | | |
| 2004–2006 | Jalapa | 39 | (0) |
| 2006–2009 | Comunicaciones | 16 | (0) |
| 2009–2010 | Peñarol La Mesilla | | |
| 2010 | Zacapa | | |
| 2010–present | USAC | | |

International career^{‡}
| 2001–2007 | Guatemala | 19 | (1) |
- * Club domestic league appearances and goals as of 13 July 2010 ‡ National team caps and goals as of 13 July 2010

Élmer Ramón Ponciano Priego (born 28 June 1978) is a Guatemalan football defender who currently plays for USAC of the Guatemalan Premier Division.

== Club career ==
Ponciano started his professional career at Antigua GFC and had two spells at Guatemalan giants Comunicaciones. He joined newly promoted Peñarol La Mesilla in summer 2009 but left the Huehuetenango side for Zacapa in February 2010 and then moved to his hometown club USAC in June 2010.

== International career ==
He made his debut for Guatemala in a March 2001 friendly match against El Salvador and has earned a total of 19 caps, scoring 1 goal. He has represented his country in 5 FIFA World Cup qualification matches and played at the 2001 and 2007 UNCAF Nations Cup as well as at the 2005 CONCACAF Gold Cup

His final international was a January 2007 UNCAF Cup match against Panama.
