= Gustavo Cabrera (footballer) =

Guatemalan footballer (born 1979)

Personal information
- Full name: Gustavo Adolfo Cabrera Marroquín
- Date of birth: 13 December 1979 (age 46)
- Place of birth: Santo Tomás, Guatemala
- Height: 1.80 m (5 ft 11 in)
- Position: Centre-back

Senior career*
Years	Team	Apps	(Gls)
1995–2004	Comunicaciones	288	(10)
2005	Real Salt Lake	4	(0)
2005–2008	Comunicaciones	34	(4)
2008	AGF Aarhus	0	(0)
2009	Jalapa	18	(2)
2009–2010	Xelajú	42	(2)
2010–2011	Municipal	45	(0)
2011	Juv. Retalteca	13	(0)
2012	Marquense	21	(0)

International career^{‡}
2000–2012	Guatemala	104	(2)
- * Club domestic league appearances and goals as of 22 February 2010 ‡ National team caps and goals as of 29 August 2013

Gustavo Adolfo Cabrera Marroquín (born 13 December 1979) is a Guatemalan former professional footballer who played as a defender. On 12 September 2012 he was banned from play for life due to allegations of match-fixing.

== Club career ==
Cabrera is the younger brother of former national team player Edy and both started playing football at JuCa de Izabal before moving to Guatemalan giants Comunicaciones. The brothers were separated when Edy joined Cobán Imperial.

Prior to joining Major League Soccer outfit Real Salt Lake midway through the 2005 season, Cabrera spent ten seasons with Comunicaciones in his native Guatemala and again in 2006. He is a two-footed player that has been used on the left, right and center of his team's formations and has won four Guatemalan League championships between 1998–2005 and was also named MVP of the Guatemalan league in 2003.

On 6 June 2008, it was confirmed at a local newspaper that he was being transferred to Danish Superliga club AGF Aarhus. Cabrera left CSD Comunicaciones on a free transfer following a contract dispute with the club in which three players from the national team filed for free agency with the football federation since the club was in arrears for over three months of salary obligations. He was released from his AGF contract on 28 November 2008. The club said that they liked him, and that he had adapted well into the team, but he did not fit into the Scandinavian style of play. He never got to play on the first team.

Cabrera returned to his native Guatemala and signed a six-month contract with C.D. Jalapa on 11 January 2009 to play for them during the 2009 Clausura. He subsequently moved on to Xelaju.

=== Match fixing allegations and suspension ===
Cabrera, along with Guillermo Ramirez and Yony Flores were found guilty by the National Football Federation of Guatemala in September 2012 of conspiring to fix a pair of national team exhibitions and a CONCACAF Champions League game between CSD Municipal and Mexico's Santos Laguna. The trio played together at Municipal in the fall of 2010, when the club finished behind Santos and the Columbus Crew in its first-round group.

After being banned from the sport inside their native country, the players later also saw their exile extended worldwide.

== International career ==
He has been a regular member of the Guatemala national team since 2000, participating in the 2002, 2006, 2010, and 2014 World Cup qualifying processes. He made his debut against Belize and has since collected 100 caps as of 12 November 2011, which makes him the second-most capped player ever for Guatemala. Cabrera has also been the captain of the national team often throughout 2007 including wearing the captain's armband for the nation's 3–2 victory over Mexico. On 27 May 2012, Cabrera was separated from the Guatemala National Team on basis of suspected " to arrange a match's result of Guatemala against Sudafrica on 2010 " as well as other arrangements which led to the defeat of his clubs at different opportunities. In June 2012, this was confirmed by a teammates, Luis Rodriguez and Carlos Ruiz. Currently Ramires is under FIFA investigation as well as by the Ministerio Publico of Guatemala for Treason, Money laundering and other accounts.

=== International goals ===
#	Date	Venue	Opponent	Score	Result	Competition
1.	10 February 2007	Estadio Cuscatlán, San Salvador, El Salvador	Belize	1–0	1–0	UNCAF Cup
2.	6 September 2011	FFB Field, Belmopan, Belize	Belize	1–0	2–1	2014 FIFA World Cup qualification
Correct as of 13 January 2017

== Honours ==
Comunicaciones

- Liga Nacional de Guatemala: Clausura 2001, Apertura 2002, Clausura 2003

Jalapa

- Liga Nacional de Guatemala: Clausura 2009

== See also ==
- List of men's footballers with 100 or more international caps
