= 2006 FIFA World Cup qualification (inter-confederation play-offs) =

Tournament details
- Dates: 12–16 November 2005
- Teams: 4 (from 4 confederations)

Tournament statistics
- Matches played: 4
- Goals scored: 5 (1.25 per match)
- Attendance: 197,689 (49,422 per match)
- Top scorer(s): (Australia) Mark Bresciano (Bahrain) Salman Isa (Trinidad and Tobago) Chris Birchall (Trinidad and Tobago) Dennis Lawrence (Uruguay) Darío Rodríguez (1 goal each)

For the 2006 FIFA World Cup qualification, there were two scheduled inter-confederation play-offs to determine the final two qualification spots to the 2006 FIFA World Cup.

== Qualified teams ==
The four teams participating were:

Confederation	Placement	Team
AFC	Fourth round (play-off) winner	Bahrain
CONCACAF	Fourth round 4th place	Trinidad and Tobago
CONMEBOL	Round-robin 5th place	Uruguay
OFC	Final round winner	Australia

== Format ==
The draw for the order in which the two matches were played was held on 10 September 2005 during the FIFA Congress in Marrakesh, Morocco.

The ties themselves were not drawn, but were allocated by FIFA as:

- CONCACAF fourth round Fourth Place v AFC fourth round winner
- CONMEBOL Fifth Place vs OFC third round winner

== Matches ==
=== CONCACAF v AFC ===
Team 1	Agg.	Team 2	1st leg	2nd leg
Trinidad and Tobago	2–1	Bahrain	1–1	1–0

12 November 2005
18:30 UTC−04:00

Trinidad and Tobago	1–1	Bahrain
Birchall 76'	Report	Isa 72'

Hasely Crawford Stadium, Port of Spain
Attendance: 24,991
Referee: Mark Shield (Australia)
16 November 2005
19:00 UTC+03:00

Bahrain	0–1	Trinidad and Tobago
	Report	Lawrence 49'

Bahrain National Stadium, Riffa
Attendance: 35,000
Referee: Óscar Ruiz (Colombia)

Trinidad and Tobago won 2–1 on aggregate and qualified for the 2006 FIFA World Cup.

=== CONMEBOL v OFC ===
Team 1	Agg.	Team 2	1st leg	2nd leg
Uruguay	1–1 (2–4 p)	Australia	1–0	0–1 (a.e.t.)

12 November 2005
18:00 UTC−03:00

Uruguay	1–0	Australia
Rodríguez 37'	Report

Estadio Centenario, Montevideo
Attendance: 55,000
Referee: Claus Bo Larsen (Denmark)
16 November 2005
20:00 UTC+11:00

Australia	1–0 (a.e.t.)	Uruguay
Bresciano 35'	Report
Penalties
Kewell (penalty scored); Neill (penalty scored); Vidmar (penalty scored); Viduka (penalty missed); Aloisi (penalty scored)	4–2	(penalty missed) Rodríguez; (penalty scored) Varela; (penalty scored) Estoyanoff; (penalty missed) Zalayeta

Telstra Stadium, Sydney
Attendance: 82,698
Referee: Luis Medina Cantalejo (Spain)

1–1 on aggregate. Australia won 4–2 on penalties and qualified for the 2006 FIFA World Cup.

== Goalscorers ==
There were 5 goals scored in 4 matches, for an average of 1.25 goals per match.

1 goal

- (Australia) Mark Bresciano
- (Bahrain) Salman Isa
- (Trinidad and Tobago) Chris Birchall
- (Trinidad and Tobago) Dennis Lawrence
- (Uruguay) Darío Rodríguez
