= Gonzalo Romero =

Guatemalan footballer

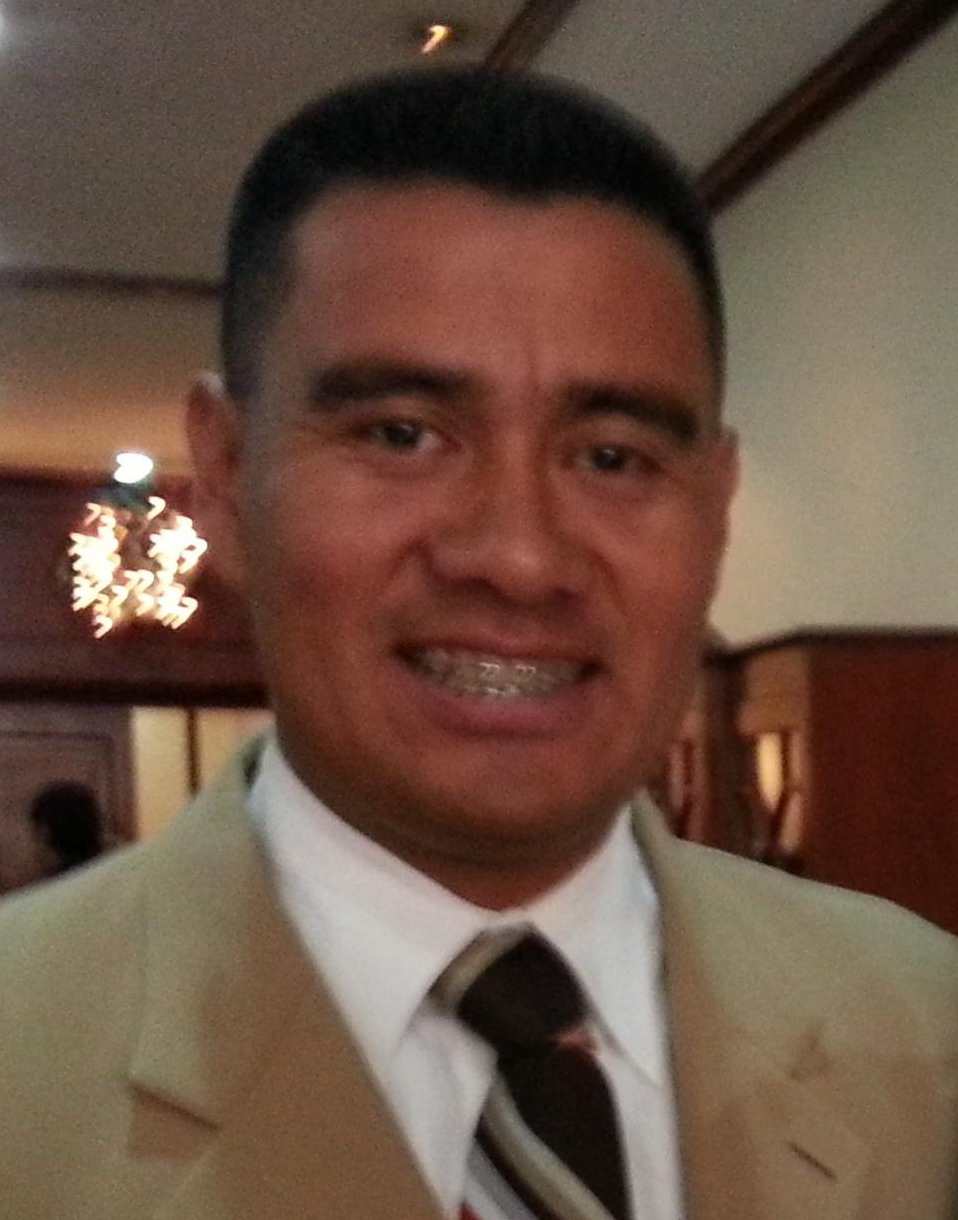
- Romero in 2018

Personal information
- Full name: Gonzalo Antonio Romero Paz
- Date of birth: March 25, 1975 (age 51)
- Place of birth: Guatemala City, Guatemala
- Height: 1.78 m (5 ft 10 in)
- Position: Midfielder

Senior career*
Years	Team	Apps	(Gls)
1993–1998	Municipal		
1998–1999	Aurora		
1999–2000	Cobán Imperial		
2000–2012	Municipal	198+	(14+)
2012	Marquense	7	(0)

International career
2000–2012	Guatemala	80	(9)
- * Club domestic league appearances and goals

Gonzalo Antonio Romero Paz (born 25 March 1975) is a Guatemalan former professional footballer who played as a midfielder.

== Club career ==
=== Municipal ===
Romero joined Guatemalan top side CSD Municipal in 2000 from Cobán Imperial.

== International career ==
He made his debut for the Guatemalan national team in a June 2000 World Cup qualification match against Antigua and Barbuda, coming on as a substitute for Edgar Valencia. He has, as of January 2010, earned 77 caps, scoring 9 goals and represented his country during the 2006 and 2010 World Cup qualification campaigns.

He also played at three CONCACAF Gold Cup tournaments.

=== International goals ===
Scores and results list. Guatemala's goal tally first.

#	Date	Venue	Opponent	Score	Result	Competition
1	2 July 2003	Candlestick Park, San Francisco, United States	Peru	1-2	1-2	Friendly match
2	31 March 2004	Estadio Cuscatlán, San Salvador, El Salvador	El Salvador	3-0	3-0	Friendly match
3	11 August 2004	Estadio Mateo Flores, Guatemala City, Guatemala	Trinidad and Tobago	3-0	4-1	Friendly match
4	23 February 2005	Estadio Mateo Flores, Guatemala City, Guatemala	Honduras	1-0	1-1	Continental qualifier
5	13 July 2005	Reliant Stadium, Houston, United States	South Africa	1-0	1-1	2005 CONCACAF Gold Cup
6	17 August 2005	Estadio Mateo Flores, Guatemala City, Guatemala	Panama	1-0	1-0	2006 FIFA World Cup qualification
7	3 September 2005	Hasely Crawford Stadium, Port of Spain, Trinidad and Tobago	Trinidad and Tobago	2-1	2-3	2006 FIFA World Cup qualification
8	21 June 2008	Los Angeles Memorial Coliseum, Los Angeles, United States	Saint Lucia	1-0	3-1	2010 FIFA World Cup qualification
9	21 June 2008	Los Angeles Memorial Coliseum, Los Angeles, United States	Saint Lucia	2-0	3-1	2010 FIFA World Cup qualification
