= Dennis Lawrence =

Trinidad and Tobago footballer (born 1974)

Dennis Lawrence CM
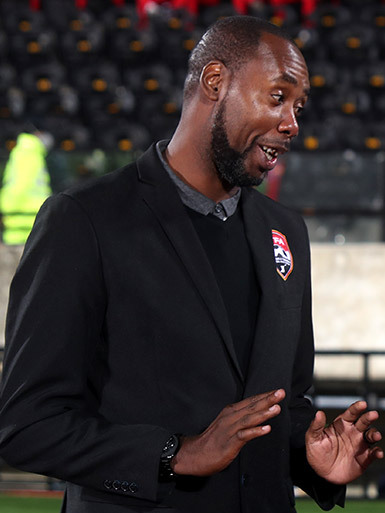
- Lawrence managing Trinidad and Tobago in 2018

Personal information
- Full name: Dennis William Lawrence
- Date of birth: 1 August 1974 (age 52)
- Place of birth: Morvant, Trinidad and Tobago
- Height: 6 ft 7 in (2.01 m)
- Position: Centre-back

Team information
- Current team: West Bromwich Albion (assistant head coach)

Senior career*
Years	Team	Apps	(Gls)
1992–1993	Barataria Ball Players		
1993–1998	Caledonia AIA		
1999–2000	Defence Force		
2001–2006	Wrexham	198	(14)
2006–2009	Swansea City	84	(7)
2008–2009	→ Crewe Alexandra (loan)	28	(3)
2009–2010	San Juan Jabloteh	7	(1)
Total		317	(25)

International career
2000–2010	Trinidad and Tobago	89	(5)

Managerial career
- 2017–2019: Trinidad and Tobago
- 2024–2026: Minnesota United (assistant)
- 2026–: West Bromwich Albion (assistant)
- * Club domestic league appearances and goals

Dennis William Lawrence (born 1 August 1974) is a Trinidadian professional football coach and former player who is currently assistant head coach of EFL Championship club West Bromwich Albion.

Prior to coaching, Lawrence had a successful playing career in England, Wales and Trinidad and Tobago. He lifted the Caribbean Cup with the Trinidad and Tobago national team and won several cup competitions with Wrexham before winning a league title with Swansea City.

Before moving to Everton in 2013, Lawrence had coached for three years at Wigan Athletic during which time he became the first Trinidadian to win the FA Cup. He was also the manager of the Soca Warriors from 2017 to 2019.

== Club career ==
Prior to becoming a footballer, Lawrence worked as a supermarket attendant in Port of Spain. He later joined the Trinidad and Tobago Defence Force and became eligible to play for their football team Defence Force.

Lawrence signed for Wrexham for a fee of £100,000 in 2001, joining from Defence Force of his native Trinidad, becoming the third Trinidadian at Wrexham along with Hector Sam and Carlos Edwards. Before signing for Wrexham, he had trials at Newcastle United and Bolton Wanderers.

After some poor performances when he first joined the club, Lawrence went on to become a valued and popular player at the Welsh club, winning the 2003–04 Player of the Season award. He has also become the first Wrexham player to play at a World Cup, starting all three of his country's games.

He signed for Swansea City on 16 August 2006 after Swansea had lost central defender and skipper Garry Monk to injury. He made an impressive Swansea debut in a 2–0 win over Doncaster Rovers winning the Man of the Match award.

On 30 September 2008 it was announced he had joined Crewe Alexandra on a 4-month loan until January. On 30 December 2008, the loan was extended until the end of the 2008–09 campaign, but he returned to the Liberty Stadium at the end of his loan spell on 2 May.

Lawrence was released from his contract after two years with Swansea City on 4 May, with his former loan employers Crewe Alexandra interested in a permanent move.

In September 2009 he signed a deal to play for San Juan Jabloteh in his native Trinidad.

On 18 March 2010, Wrexham manager Dean Saunders revealed that Lawrence was training at his former club along with fellow former Swansea player Kristian O'Leary.

== International career ==
Lawrence has been an important player for the Trinidad and Tobago national team, having made his debut on 18 March 2000. He was awarded the MVP (Most Valuable Player) award at the 2001 Caribbean Cup, which Trinidad and Tobago won. On 16 November 2005, he (in his 61st cap) scored the goal against Bahrain that awarded Trinidad and Tobago a ticket to the 2006 World Cup. He played every minute of his country's campaign in Germany as the Soca Warriors secured an impressive 0–0 draw against Sweden and gave England a run for their money.

He is also the player who approached Port Vale's Chris Birchall and asked him if he was interested in representing Trinidad and Tobago (Chris' mother was born there).

After a failed qualifying campaign for the 2010 FIFA World Cup, Lawrence, who had succeeded Dwight Yorke as national captain, announced his retirement from international football with 89 caps under his belt.

== Coaching career ==
Lawrence joined Wigan Athletic as a coach in October 2010 after impressing manager Roberto Martinez on a trial during the 2010–11 pre-season. When Martinez was appointed as manager of Everton, Lawrence was appointed as first-team development coach.

On 30 January 2017, Lawrence was appointed manager of Trinidad and Tobago.

On 25 June 2021, Lawrence was appointed as Coventry City's first-team coach, joining manager Mark Robins' coaching team. On 12 March 2022, Robins and his assistant Adi Viveash both tested positive for COVID-19, which left Lawrence in charge of the Sky Blues during their game against Sheffield United, which ended in a 4–1 win.

On 13 March 2024, Lawrence joined Minnesota United as an assistant coach alongside Eric Ramsay. In January 2026, Lawrence joined West Bromwich Albion as their assistant coach with Ramsay as first-team head coach.

== Personal life ==
As a member of the Trinidad and Tobago squad that competed at the 2006 FIFA World Cup in Germany, Lawrence was awarded the Chaconia Medal (Gold Class), the second highest state decoration of Trinidad and Tobago.

== Career statistics ==
=== International ===
Appearances and goals by national team and year
National team	Year	Apps	Goals
Trinidad and Tobago	2000	16	0
Trinidad and Tobago	2001	14	1
Trinidad and Tobago	2002	–	
Trinidad and Tobago	2003	5	0
Trinidad and Tobago	2004	9	0
Trinidad and Tobago	2005	15	3
Trinidad and Tobago	2006	11	0
Trinidad and Tobago	2007	–	
Trinidad and Tobago	2008	11	1
Trinidad and Tobago	2009	8	0
Total		89	5

Scores and results list Trinidad and Tobago's goal tally first, score column indicates score after each Lawrence goal.

List of international goals scored by Dennis Lawrence
No.	Date	Venue	Opponent	Score	Result	Competition
1	19 May 2001	Hasely Crawford Stadium, Port of Spain, Trinidad and Tobago	Martinique	1–1	1–2	2001 Caribbean Cup
2	25 May 2005	Hasely Crawford Stadium, Port of Spain, Trinidad and Tobago	Bermuda	3–0	4–0	Friendly
3	4 June 2005	Hasely Crawford Stadium, Port of Spain, Trinidad and Tobago	Panama	2–0	2–0	2006 FIFA World Cup qualification
4	16 November 2005	Bahrain National Stadium, Riffa, Bahrain	Bahrain	1–0	1–0	2006 FIFA World Cup qualification
5	3 September 2008	Hasely Crawford Stadium, Port of Spain, Trinidad and Tobago	Guyana	3–0	3–0	Friendly

== Managerial statistics ==
As of match played 17 November 2019

Managerial record by team and tenure
Team	Nat	From	To	Record							
Team	Nat	From	To	G	W	D	L	GF	GA	GD	Win %
Trinidad and Tobago	(Trinidad and Tobago)	30 January 2017	14 December 2019	31	5	7	19	36	53	−17	16.13
Total				31	5	7	19	36	53	−17	16.13

== Honours ==
Wrexham

- Football League Trophy: 2004–05
- FAW Premier Cup: 2000–01, 2002–03, 2003–04

Swansea City

- Football League One: 2007–08

Trinidad and Tobago

- Caribbean Cup: 2001
- Caribbean Cup MVP: 2001

Individual

- Wrexham Player of the Season: 2003–04
- Chaconia Medal Gold Class, 2006
