= Guatemala national football team =

Men's association football team

Guatemala
- Nickname(s): Los Chapines (The Chapines); La Azul y Blanco (The Blue and White); La Bicolor (The Bicolor); Los Mayas (The Mayans); Los Hombres de Maíz (The Men of Maize)
- Association: Federación de Fútbol de Guatemala (FFG)
- Confederation: CONCACAF (North America)
- Sub-confederation: UNCAF (Central America)
- Head coach: Luis Fernando Tena
- Captain: José Carlos Pinto
- Most caps: Carlos Ruiz (133)
- Top scorer: Carlos Ruiz (68)
- Home stadium: Various
- FIFA code: GUA
| First colours | Second colours | Third colours |

FIFA ranking
- Current: 94 (19 January 2026)
- Highest: 50 (August 2006)
- Lowest: 163 (November 1995)

First international
- Guatemala 9–0 Honduras (Guatemala City, Guatemala; 14 September 1921)

Biggest win
- Guatemala 10–0 Anguilla (Guatemala City, Guatemala; 5 September 2019); Guatemala 10–0 Saint Vincent and the Grenadines (Guatemala City, Guatemala; 4 June 2021)

Biggest defeat
- Costa Rica 9–1 Guatemala (San José, Costa Rica; 24 July 1955)

CONCACAF Championship / Gold Cup
- Appearances: 21 (first in 1963)
- Best result: Champions (1967)

Olympic Games
- Appearances: 3 (first in 1968)
- Best result: Quarter-finals (1968)

CCCF Championship
- Appearances: 6 (first in 1943)
- Best result: Runners-up (1943, 1946, 1948)

The Guatemala national football team (Spanish: Selección de fútbol de Guatemala) represents Guatemala in men's international football, and is governed by the Football Federation of Guatemala (Spanish: Federación de Fútbol de Guatemala), the governing body for football in Guatemala founded in 1919. It has been a full member of FIFA since 1946, is a founding member of CONCACAF which was founded in 1961, and is also a member of UNCAF in the Central American Zone. From 1938 to 1961, the team was a member of CCCF, the former governing body of football in Central America and Caribbean and a predecessor confederation of CONCACAF. Guatemala was also a member of PFC, the former unified confederation of the Americas.

Guatemala has never qualified for the FIFA World Cup, but qualified three times for the Olympic Games (1968, 1976, and 1988), and reaching the quarter-finals in 1968. Guatemala has participated twenty-one times in CONCACAF's premier continental competition, it is one of three Central American teams to have won a title, winning the CONCACAF Championship in 1967. The team's best performance under the CONCACAF Gold Cup format was finishing as fourth place in 1996 and reaching the semifinals in 2025. It has participated three times in League A, once in League B and once in League C of the CONCACAF Nations League.

In subcontinental competitions, the team won the 2001 UNCAF Nations Cup, it finished as runners-up three times in the CCCF Championship, and won the silver medal at the Central American and Caribbean Games in 1950.

== History ==
=== Beginnings ===
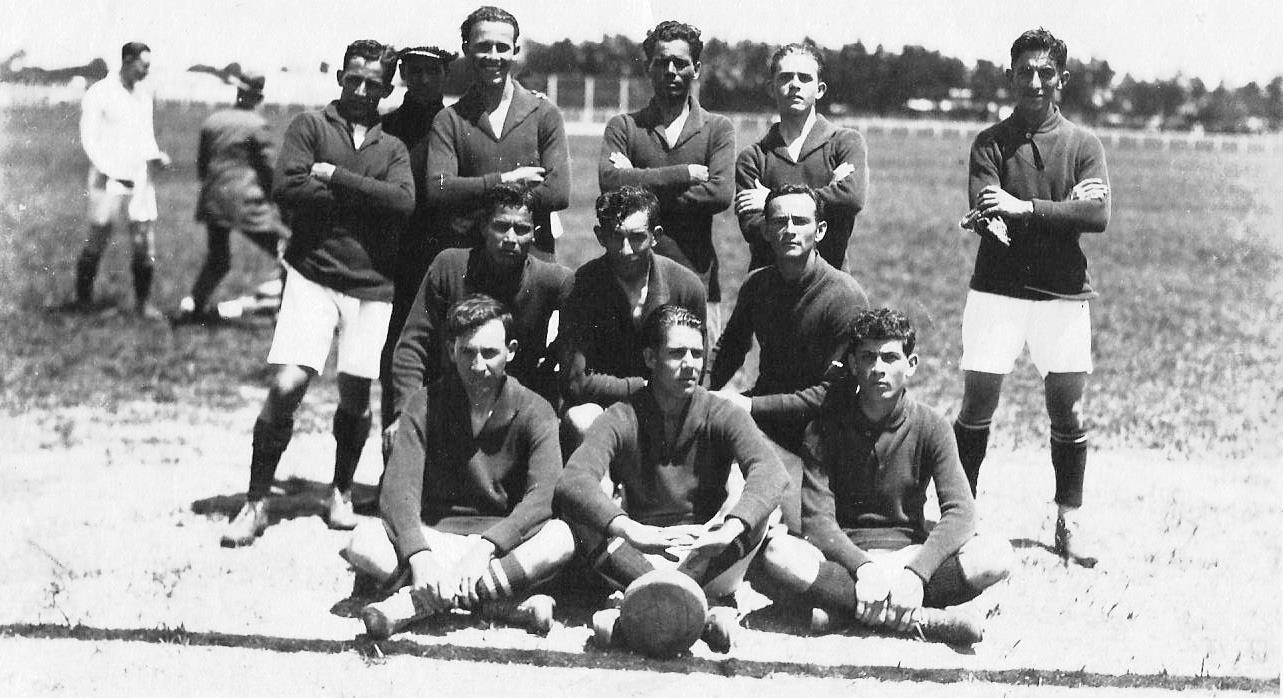
Guatemalan Squad (CRC vs GUA 1921)

Guatemala created its first football team, made up of 22 players, on 23 August 1902. The team was split into two sides, blue and white. With time, clubs were made and eventually the Guatemala national team, nicknamed "la Azul y Blanco" (the blue and white), was created in 1921. Guatemala had its first game on 16 September 1921, in the Independence Centenary Games held in Guatemala City, against Honduras. Guatemala beat Honduras 9–0. In the final, Guatemala were defeated 6–0 by Costa Rica.

Guatemala had success in several editions of the CCCF Championship, the precursor of the Gold Cup, by being the runners-up in 1943, 1946, and 1948. In 1958, Guatemala began participating in the qualifying rounds of the World Cup. They finished last, without a point, in a group with Costa Rica and the Netherlands Antilles.

=== Success in the 1960s ===
Guatemala's performance in the World Cup qualifying rounds began to improve in the 1960s. In 1962 they drew against both Costa Rica (4–4) and Honduras (1–1). However they again finished last in their qualifying group.

Guatemala did not participate in the qualifying round in 1966, as FIFA refused their participation for administrative reasons.

Guatemala joined CONCACAF in 1961. In 1967, they again showed the progress they had made when by participating by winning the Gold Cup for the only time in their history. In that tournament, hosted by Honduras, Guatemala began with a 2–1 win against Haiti, followed by a 1–0 win over the defending champions, Mexico, a 0–0 draw against Honduras, a 2–0 win over Trinidad and Tobago, and a 2–0 win over Nicaragua. The forward Manuel "Escopeta" Recinos was Guatemala's top scorer with four goals, including the goal against Mexico.

Guatemala were also the runners-up in the CONCACAF Championship in 1965 and 1969.

Results

| Rank | Team | Pts | Pld | W | D | L | GF | GA | GD |
|---|---|---|---|---|---|---|---|---|---|
| 1 | Guatemala | 9 | 5 | 4 | 1 | 0 | 7 | 1 | 6 |
| 2 | Mexico | 8 | 5 | 4 | 0 | 1 | 10 | 1 | 9 |
| 3 | Honduras | 6 | 5 | 2 | 2 | 1 | 4 | 2 | 2 |
| 4 | Trinidad and Tobago | 4 | 5 | 2 | 0 | 3 | 6 | 10 | −4 |
| 5 | Haiti | 2 | 5 | 1 | 0 | 4 | 5 | 9 | −4 |
| 6 | Nicaragua | 1 | 5 | 0 | 1 | 4 | 3 | 12 | −9 |

In 1967, Guatemala showed further progress by qualifying for the 1968 Olympic football tournament in Mexico City. In the first round, they won 1–0 against Czechoslovakia, and 4–1 against Thailand, and lost to Bulgaria 2–1. They went on the next round, where they lost 1–0 to the eventual champions, Hungary.

=== 2006 World Cup ===
Before the 2006 World Cup qualifiers, Carlos Ruiz was the main focus in providing goals for the national team along with Juan Carlos Plata. Many other stars such as Fredy Garcia, Gonzalo Romero, Guillermo Ramirez, and Martin Machón were expected to play huge roles as well. In the 2006 World Cup qualifying, Guatemala advanced to the third round by beating Suriname 4–2. There they finished second in Group B, behind Costa Rica, with 10 points each. In the fourth round they started with a 0–0 draw against Panama and a 5–1 win against Trinidad and Tobago. Then their fortunes would change starting with a 2–0 loss away against the United States and at home against Mexico followed by a 3–2 loss against Costa Rica. Many fans have begun to doubt the national team's chances of clinching their first World Cup berth, that was until a last second strike from Gonzalo Romero that gave them a 2–1 win against Panama. They lost against Trinidad and Tobago 3–2, drew against the United States 0–0 and then lost to Mexico 5–2. Guatemala had 8 points with one game left, and a win alongside a Trinidad and Tobago defeat against Mexico would send them into the play-offs. They won 3–1 against Costa Rica but Trinidad and Tobago beat Mexico 2–1. They finished in fifth place, two points away from the play-off spot. Juan Carlos Plata and Martin Machón announced their retirement from International Football in 2006.

| Pos | Team | Pld | W | D | L | GF | GA | GD | Pts | Qualification | (United States) | (Mexico) | (Costa Rica) | (Trinidad and Tobago) | (Guatemala) | (Panama) |
|---|---|---|---|---|---|---|---|---|---|---|---|---|---|---|---|---|
| 1 | United States | 10 | 7 | 1 | 2 | 16 | 6 | +10 | 22 (Note: Tied on head-to-head points (3). Head-to-head goal difference: United States +1, Mexico −1.) | 2006 FIFA World Cup | — | 2–0 | 3–0 | 1–0 | 2–0 | 2–0 |
| 2 | Mexico | 10 | 7 | 1 | 2 | 22 | 9 | +13 | 22 | 2006 FIFA World Cup | 2–1 | — | 2–0 | 2–0 | 5–2 | 5–0 |
| 3 | Costa Rica | 10 | 5 | 1 | 4 | 15 | 14 | +1 | 16 | 2006 FIFA World Cup | 3–0 | 1–2 | — | 2–0 | 3–2 | 2–1 |
| 4 | Trinidad and Tobago | 10 | 4 | 1 | 5 | 10 | 15 | −5 | 13 | Inter-confederation play-offs | 1–2 | 2–1 | 0–0 | — | 3–2 | 2–0 |
| 5 | Guatemala | 10 | 3 | 2 | 5 | 16 | 18 | −2 | 11 | | 0–0 | 0–2 | 3–1 | 5–1 | — | 2–1 |
| 6 | Panama | 10 | 0 | 2 | 8 | 4 | 21 | −17 | 2 | | 0–3 | 1–1 | 1–3 | 0–1 | 0–0 | — |

=== 2010 World Cup ===
After a third-place finish at the 2007 UNCAF Nations Cup, and reaching the knockout stage in the Gold Cup of the same year, along with a couple of satisfying friendly matches, including a 3–2 win against Mexico, Hernán Darío Gómez was to be the next coach to lead Guatemala into the Hexagonal in the World Cup qualifying stage. However, after losing 5–0 in early 2008 against the under-23 Argentine team, the Colombian soon departed. During 2010 World Cup qualifying, expectations of qualifying for the finals were set among the national team as Ramon Maradiaga returned as coach. They began well by advancing to the third round by defeating Saint Lucia 9–1 on aggregate.

In the third round, Guatemala began with a 1–0 home loss to the United States, with controversies surrounding the Panamanian referee Roberto Moreno, including not awarding a penalty to Guatemala in the first half after a handball from Steve Cherundolo, as well as Gustavo Cabrera being sent off after colliding with Eddie Lewis in the second half. In their second match, Los Chapines salvaged a draw in the closing minutes of the game against Trinidad and Tobago in Port of Spain after Carlos Gallardo deflected a free kick by Marco Pappa. On 10 September, Cuba shocked the Guatemalan supporters by taking the lead after Roberto Linares scored in the 25th minute, but by half-time, Carlos Ruiz had equalised, and in the second half, Ruiz scored again. Mario Rodríguez and José Manuel Contreras also scored and Guatemala won 4–1.

On 11 October, many fans gathered around the Estadio Mateo Flores for the game against Trinidad and Tobago. Despite being reduced to 10 men, the Soca Warriors were able to hold Guatemala to a 0–0 stalemate. Guatemala then lost in Cuba, falling behind 1–0 after Jaime Colome scored a penalty. Marco Pappa volleyed in an equalizer in the 80th minute, but Urgelles won the match for Cuba in the 90th minute. Meanwhile, the Trinidadians defeated the United States 2–1 at home, putting them in second place. Maradiaga was fired and Benjamin Monterroso was appointed, focusing on the Copa UNCAF the following January. A 2–0 away loss against the United States confirmed the elimination of the national team from the World Cup.

At the UNCAF nations cup, Monterroso wanted to introduce more youthful players into the starting line up such as Minor Lopez, Ricardo Jerez and Wilson Lalin, but Guatemala lost both group stage matches against Costa Rica and also lost 2–0 to Nicaragua in the play-off match for the final berth to attend the next Gold Cup; Minor Lopez was the lone goal scorer for Los Bicolores. As a result, the national team were inactive for the next two years and Monterroso stepped down after two months in charge.

| Pos | Team | Pld | W | D | L | GF | GA | GD | Pts | (United States) | (Trinidad and Tobago) | (Guatemala) | (Cuba) |
|---|---|---|---|---|---|---|---|---|---|---|---|---|---|
| 1 | United States | 6 | 5 | 0 | 1 | 14 | 3 | +11 | 15 | — | 3–0 | 2–0 | 6–1 |
| 2 | Trinidad and Tobago | 6 | 3 | 2 | 1 | 9 | 6 | +3 | 11 | 2–1 | — | 1–1 | 3–0 |
| 3 | Guatemala | 6 | 1 | 2 | 3 | 6 | 7 | −1 | 5 | 0–1 | 0–0 | — | 4–1 |
| 4 | Cuba | 6 | 1 | 0 | 5 | 5 | 18 | −13 | 3 | 0–1 | 1–3 | 2–1 | — |

=== 2014 World Cup ===
In May 2010, the Uruguayan-born Paraguayan Ever Hugo Almeida was appointed as the Guatemala's next coach. At the 2011 Copa Centroamericana, formerly known as the "UNCAF Nations Cup", Guatemala finished in fifth place, losing 2–0 to Costa Rica and 3–1 Honduras before defeating Nicaragua 2–1 to qualify for the 2011 Gold Cup.

At the Gold Cup, Guatemala drew 0–0 against Honduras despite being reduced to nine men. They lost against a physically superior Jamaica 2–0, but managed to redeem themselves by beating Grenada 4–0, with goals from José Javier del Águila, Marco Pappa, Carlos Ruiz, and Carlos Gallardo. In the quarter-finals, they lost to 2–1 the reigning champions Mexico, after Ruiz had given them the lead in the first half.

For the 2014 World Cup qualifiers, Guatemala began in the second round with six wins in six games, advancing to a third round group alongside the United States, Jamaica and Antigua and Barbuda. Before the third round, three key players – Guillermo Ramirez, Gustavo Cabrera and Yony Flores – were sent home during a practice session after their team-mates Ruiz and Luis Rodriguez heard of their involvement in money laundering and bribery in fixing multiple fixtures; they were subsequently banned for life.

The team began with an away loss to Jamaica, with Dwight Pezzarossi only managing to pull back one goal in stoppage time. In the next match, Guatemala drew at home against the United States, with Marco Pappa's free kick salvaging a draw for the Guatemalans. At home against Antigua and Barbuda, Guatemala again fell behind, but after the Antiguan goalkeeper Molvin James was sent off for wasting time, Ruiz scored a brace and a goal from Pezzarossi sealed a 3–1 victory. Four days later, a goal from Ruiz sufficed for an away win against the same opponents in North Sound.

Guatemala beat Jamaica at home 2–1, leaving them needing a draw against the United States to progress to the final stage of the qualifiers. After they took the lead in the first five minutes thanks to Ruiz, the United States scored three unanswered goals, and Guatemala finished behind Jamaica on goal difference.

In January 2013, still led by Almeida, Guatemala participated in the 2013 Copa Centroamericana. With a team of mainly younger players, they could only manage three draws in their group play (1–1 against Nicaragua, 0–0 against Belize and 1–1 against Costa Rica), losing out to Belize for direct qualification for the 2013 Gold Cup. They faced Panama in the fifth place match, but lost 3–1, and Almeida stepped down in favour of the technical director, Victor Hugo Monzón.

==== Group E ====
| Pos | Team | Pld | W | D | L | GF | GA | GD | Pts | Qualification | Guatemala national football team | Belize national football team | Saint Vincent and the Grenadines national football team | Grenada national football team |
|---|---|---|---|---|---|---|---|---|---|---|---|---|---|---|
| 1 | Guatemala | 6 | 6 | 0 | 0 | 19 | 3 | +16 | 18 | Advance to third round | — | 3–1 | 4–0 | 3–0 |
| 2 | Belize | 6 | 2 | 1 | 3 | 9 | 10 | −1 | 7 | | 1–2 | — | 1–1 | 1–4 |
| 3 | Saint Vincent and the Grenadines | 6 | 1 | 2 | 3 | 4 | 12 | −8 | 5 | | 0–3 | 0–2 | — | 2–1 |
| 4 | Grenada | 6 | 1 | 1 | 4 | 7 | 14 | −7 | 4 | | 1–4 | 0–3 | 1–1 | — |

==== Third Round (Group A) ====
| Pos | Team | Pld | W | D | L | GF | GA | GD | Pts | Qualification |
|---|---|---|---|---|---|---|---|---|---|---|
| 1 | United States | 6 | 4 | 1 | 1 | 11 | 6 | +5 | 13 | Advance to fourth round |
| 2 | Jamaica | 6 | 3 | 1 | 2 | 9 | 6 | +3 | 10 | Advance to fourth round |
| 3 | Guatemala | 6 | 3 | 1 | 2 | 9 | 8 | +1 | 10 | |
| 4 | Antigua and Barbuda | 6 | 0 | 1 | 5 | 4 | 13 | −9 | 1 | |

=== 2016 FIFA suspension ===
On 28 October 2016, the Guatemalan football federation was suspended indefinitely by FIFA, after the international football governing body had appointed an oversight committee to look into allegations of corruption. FIFA stated that the Guatemalan federation (FEDEFUT) had rejected the committee's mandate to run FEDEFUT's business, organize elections, and modernize its statutes, and would remain barred from international competition until FEDEFUT ratified an extension of the mandate. The football team missed their chance on qualifying on the 2017 and 2019 CONCACAF Gold Cup tournaments (2017 Copa Centroamericana and 2019–20 CONCACAF Nations League qualifying) as they missed deadlines to have their suspension lifted.

The suspension was lifted on 31 May 2018 after FEDEFUT's normalization committee became fully operational.

=== 2018 World Cup ===
After their FIFA suspension, Guatemala resumed normal operations and went through World Cup Qualification. They did not advance beyond qualification for the 2018 FIFA World Cup. Guatemala drew in the first leg against Bermuda, and won 1–0 in the second. After a loss of 0–1 to Antigua and Barbuda in the first leg, they won 2–0 in the second leg. Overall, they placed 3rd in their table and failed to advance further.

| Pos | Team | Pld | W | D | L | GF | GA | GD | Pts | Qualification |
|---|---|---|---|---|---|---|---|---|---|---|
| 1 | United States | 6 | 4 | 1 | 1 | 20 | 3 | +17 | 13 | Advance to fifth round |
| 2 | Trinidad and Tobago | 6 | 3 | 2 | 1 | 13 | 9 | +4 | 11 | Advance to fifth round |
| 3 | Guatemala | 6 | 3 | 1 | 2 | 18 | 11 | +7 | 10 | |
| 4 | Saint Vincent and the Grenadines | 6 | 0 | 0 | 6 | 6 | 34 | −28 | 0 | |

Source: FIFA

=== 2022 World Cup ===
Between 2018 and 2022, Guatemala had mixed results in their international meetings, losing 0–3 to intracontinental neighbors, Mexico, and 0–2 to Panama. However, they did beat Saint Vincent and the Grenadines, French Guiana, and El Salvador by large margins, those being 10–0, 2–0, and 4–0 respectively.

Before qualification, they had lost twice, drawn once and won only 3 of 6 matches in early 2020 before 2022 World Cup qualification.

Guatemala did not advance beyond qualification for the 2022 FIFA World Cup. Guatemala won 1–0 against Cuba with a goal from Luis Martinez in the 60th minute. They then won 0–3 against British Virgin Islands. Guatemala then scored 10 goals by 10 different players against Saint Vincent and the Grenadines. They drew 0–0 against Curaçao, leading to Curaçao and Guatemala being drawn with 10 points each in the table, and Curaçao went on to the next round of qualification due to having more goals scored, thus eliminating Guatemala from further eliminatory matches in qualification.

| Pos | Team | Pld | W | D | L | GF | GA | GD | Pts | Qualification |
|---|---|---|---|---|---|---|---|---|---|---|
| 1 | Curaçao | 4 | 3 | 1 | 0 | 15 | 1 | +14 | 10 | Advance to second round |
| 2 | Guatemala | 4 | 3 | 1 | 0 | 14 | 0 | +14 | 10 | |
| 3 | Cuba | 4 | 2 | 0 | 2 | 7 | 3 | +4 | 6 | |
| 4 | Saint Vincent and the Grenadines | 4 | 1 | 0 | 3 | 3 | 16 | −13 | 3 | |
| 5 | British Virgin Islands | 4 | 0 | 0 | 4 | 0 | 19 | −19 | 0 | |

Source: FIFA
Rules for classification: Tiebreakers

=== 2026 World Cup ===
Guatemala had a historic run in the 2023 CONCACAF Gold Cup, topping Group D, where they beat Cuba 1–0, drew against Canada, and won 2–3 in their final group stage game against Guadeloupe. They lost in the quarter-finals against Jamaica with a 0–1 score. They ended in fifth place at the tournament. In the following tournament, the 2023–24 CONCACAF Nations League, Guatemala finished 4th in Group A of League A, finishing below Martinique and Panama. They only won 1 of 4 matchdays with a 2–0 win against El Salvador, losing against Trinidad and Tobago and Panama.

In the beginning of 2024, Guatemala played a friendly against European national team Iceland, where they lost 0–1 in a late winner by Ísak Þorvaldsson in the 79th minute. In March, they played against South American national team Ecuador, losing 2–0 from an early 8th-minute goal by John Yeboah and a late finisher 86th-minute goal by Gonzalo Plata. Guatemala were winless in their first four national fixtures of 2024. Guatemala saw victories during the 2026 FIFA World Cup Qualification in their first 2 games, winning 6–0 against Dominica and 0–3 against the British Virgin Islands. In June, Guatemala played against 2022 FIFA World Cup champions Argentina, losing 4–1 with their only goal being by Lisandro Martinez, who scored an own goal in the fourth minute after a Guatemalan freekick. It is the first and only goal Guatemala has ever scored against Argentina. Nicholas Hagen recorded 6 saves against Argentina, with 5 being in the penalty box. Hagen saved an attempted bicycle kick from Ángel Di María, preventing an Argentinian goal. Guatemala participated in the 2024–25 CONCACAF Nations League, and ended their run in the tournament after placing 3rd in League A on goal difference.

In 2025, Guatemala achieved their best result in the CONCACAF Gold Cup by finishing 3rd. They qualified for the 2025 CONCACAF Gold Cup after beating Guyana 4–3 on aggregate in the preliminary round. Guatemala placed ahead of Jamaica and secured a 0–1 win (being their first in a Gold Cup tournament) against them marking only their 6th win against them. However, goalkeeper Nicholas Hagen suffered an injury that would prevent him from appearing in the next round of the competition, to which manager Tena responded with the start of Kenderson Navarro, who had not made many appearances with the national team. Guatemala advanced to the quarter-finals after placing 2nd in their group, and after doing so beat Canada 5–6 in penalties after drawing 1–1 after full time to qualify for the semi-finals.

| Pos | Team | Pld | W | D | L | GF | GA | GD | Pts | Qualification |
|---|---|---|---|---|---|---|---|---|---|---|
| 1 | Panama | 3 | 3 | 0 | 0 | 10 | 3 | +7 | 9 | Advance to knockout stage |
| 2 | Guatemala | 3 | 2 | 0 | 1 | 4 | 3 | +1 | 6 | Advance to knockout stage |
| 3 | Jamaica | 3 | 1 | 0 | 2 | 3 | 6 | −3 | 3 | |
| 4 | Guadeloupe | 3 | 0 | 0 | 3 | 5 | 10 | −5 | 0 | |

Source: CONCACAF

After having won the quarter-final against Canada, Guatemala qualified for the semi-finals for the first time since 1996, and faced the United States. Guatemala ended their tournament run in a 2–1 loss with a goal from youngster Olger Escobar in the 80th minute. Guatemala's international rankings moved up six places, reaching 100th on July 10, 2025.

During the second round of 2026 FIFA World Cup qualification, Guatemala secured their advance to the third round of qualification after beating Dominican Republic 4–2. However, after a successful second round of qualification, Guatemala fell short in the final round, placing 3rd and being eliminated from qualification, ending Guatemala's efforts to qualify for their first ever World Cup.

| Pos | Team | Pld | W | D | L | GF | GA | GD | Pts | Qualification |
|---|---|---|---|---|---|---|---|---|---|---|
| 1 | Panama | 6 | 3 | 3 | 0 | 9 | 4 | +5 | 12 | 2026 FIFA World Cup |
| 2 | Suriname | 6 | 2 | 3 | 1 | 9 | 6 | +3 | 9 | Inter-confederation play-offs |
| 3 | Guatemala | 6 | 2 | 2 | 2 | 8 | 7 | +1 | 8 | |
| 4 | El Salvador | 6 | 1 | 0 | 5 | 2 | 11 | −9 | 3 | |

Source: FIFA
Rules for classification: Tiebreakers

== Home stadium ==
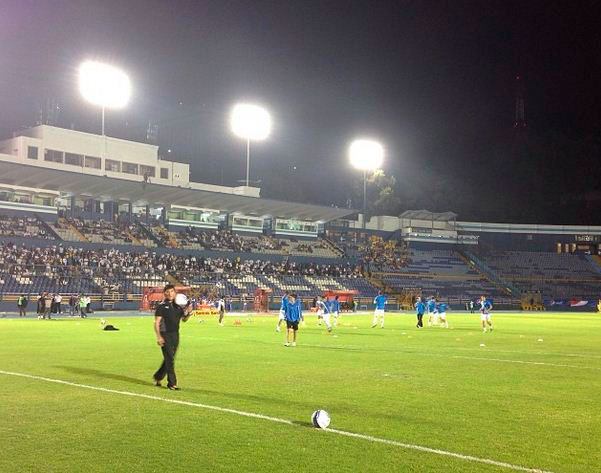
Training in the Estadio Doroteo Guamuch

The Estadio Doroteo Guamuch Flores, also known as Coloso de la Zona 5, is a multi-use national stadium in Guatemala City, the largest in Guatemala. It was built in 1948, to host the Central American and Caribbean Games in 1950, and was renamed after long-distance runner Mateo Flores, winner of the 1952 Boston Marathon. It has a capacity of 26,000 seats.

Used mostly for football matches, the stadium has hosted the majority of the home matches of the Guatemala national football team throughout its entire history. Its highest record attendance was of 82,000 during the 1950 Central American and Caribbean Games.

== Team image ==
Since the late 1990s, Guatemala's shirts has generally featured a sash. The sash is either blue on its white shirts or a lighter colored sash on its away kits. This has made the team more distinguishable from Central American neighbors that features similar color schemes such as El Salvador, Honduras, and Nicaragua.

=== Kit suppliers ===
| Kit supplier | Period |
|---|---|
| (Guatemala) Sportica | 1980–1981 |
| (West Germany) Erima | 1981–1983 |
| (West Germany) Adidas | 1986 |
| (South Korea) Pro-Specs | 1988–1989 |
| (Germany) Erima | 1992–1994 |
| (England) Umbro | 1996–1997 |
| (Mexico) Aba Sport | 1997–1998 |
| (Mexico) Atletica | 1998–2002 |
| (Germany) Adidas | 2005–2007 |
| (Germany) Puma | 2007–2010 |
| (England) Umbro | 2011–present |

== Results and fixtures ==
The following is a list of match results in the last 12 months, as well as any future matches that have been scheduled.

Win Draw Loss Fixture

=== 2025 ===
| 13 November 2026 FIFA World Cup qualification | Guatemala | 2–3 | Panama | Guatemala City, Guatemala |
| 20:00 UTC−6 | Ordóñez 69'; Muñoz 72' | Report | Waterman 30', 44'; Fajardo 78' | Stadium: Estadio Manuel Felipe Carrera; Attendance: 6,819; Referee: César Arturo Ramos (Mexico) |

| 18 November 2026 FIFA World Cup qualification | Guatemala | 3–1 | Suriname | Guatemala City, Guatemala |
| 19:00 UTC−6 | Lom 49'; Escobar 57'; Santis 65' | Report | Samayoa 90+3' (o.g.) | Stadium: Estadio Manuel Felipe Carrera; Referee: Juan Calderón (Costa Rica) |

=== 2026 ===
| 17 January Non-FIFA friendly | Canada | 1–0 | Guatemala | Los Angeles, United States |
| 19:00 UTC−8 | Russell-Rowe 66' | Report | | Stadium: BMO Stadium; Referee: Rosendo Mendoza (United States) |
Note: The Canadian Soccer Association previously said the match would be a full A-level international; however, the match was later reclassified as a B-level international according to the linked match report.

| 27 March Friendly | Algeria | 7–0 | Guatemala | Genoa, Italy |
| 20:45 UTC+2 | Gouiri 19', 60'; Mahrez 31' (pen.); Abada 45+1'; Aouar 47'; Ghedjemis 76'; Benbouali 82' | Report | | Stadium: Stadio Luigi Ferraris; Referee: Andrea Colombo (Italy) |

| 4 June Friendly | Czech Republic | 3–1 | Guatemala | Harrison, United States |
| 20:00 UTC−4 | Schick 11'; Chorý 72'; Višinský 79' | Report | Fajardo 40' | Stadium: Sports Illustrated Stadium; Referee: Pierre-Luc Lauzière (Canada) |

| 7 June Friendly | Ecuador | 3–0 | Guatemala | Columbus, United States |
| 16:00 UTC−4 | J. Caicedo 19' (pen.); Angulo 73'; Estupiñán 78' | Report | | Stadium: ScottsMiracle-Gro Field; Referee: Marco Ortíz (Mexico) |

| 25 September 2026–27 Nations League | Jamaica | 3–2 | Guatemala | Kingston, Jamaica |
| 19:00 UTC−5 | Palmer 37'; Burrell 53'; Cephas 90+4' | Report | Santis 2', 67' | Stadium: Independence Park; Attendance: 3,161; Referee: Keylor Herrera (Costa Rica) |

| 28 September 2026–27 Nations League | Guatemala | 6–0 | El Salvador | Guatemala City, Guatemala |
| 20:00 UTC−6 | Lom 8'; Rubín 28'; Fajardo 32', 89', 90+2'; Aparicio 56' | Report | | Stadium: Estadio Manuel Felipe Carrera; Attendance: 4,826; Referee: Luis Enrique Santander (Mexico) |

| 2 October 2026–27 Nations League | Suriname | 0–0 | Guatemala | Paramaribo, Suriname |
| 19:00 UTC−3 | | Report | | Stadium: Dr. Ir. Franklin Essed Stadion; Attendance: 3,592; Referee: Katia García (Mexico) |

| 5 October 2026–27 Nations League | Guatemala | 1–0 | Suriname | Guatemala City, Guatemala |
| 18:00 UTC−6 | Evans 90+6' | Report | | Stadium: Estadio Manuel Felipe Carrera; Referee: Joe Dickerson (United States) |

| 13 November 2026–27 Nations League QF 1st Leg | Guatemala | 2–3 | Canada | Guatemala City, Guatemala |
| 20:00 UTC−6 | Santis 54'; De Fougerolles 90+4' (o.g.) | Report | Oluwaseyi 18'; Millar 28'; J. David 45+2' | Stadium: Estadio Manuel Felipe Carrera; Referee: Iván Barton (El Salvador) |

| 16 November 2026–27 Nations League QF 2nd Leg | Canada | 4–1 (7–3 agg.) | Guatemala | Toronto, Canada |
| 20:00 UTC−5 | J. David 39' (pen.); Oluwaseyi 45+1', 62'; Buchanan 53' | Report | Santis 34' | Stadium: BMO Field; Referee: César Ramos (Mexico) |
Note: Canada won 7–3 on aggregate, advanced to the Finals and qualified for the 2027 Gold Cup. Guatemala qualified for the 2027 Gold Cup qualification.

== Coaching history ==
As of 2 July 2025

| Name | Period | Matches | Wins | Draws | Losses | Winning % | Notes |
|---|---|---|---|---|---|---|---|
| (Costa Rica) Roberto Figueredo | 1930 | 2 | 0 | 0 | 2 | 00.0% | |
| (England) Jimmy Elliott | 1935 | 5 | 0 | 1 | 4 | 20.0% | |
| (Guatemala) Manuel Felipe Carrera | 1943 | 6 | 4 | 1 | 1 | 66.7% | 1943 CCCF Championship 2nd place |
| (Guatemala) Juan Francisco Aguirre | 1946 | 5 | 3 | 1 | 1 | 60.0% | |
| (Guatemala) Juan Francisco Aguirre (Guatemala) Manuel Felipe Carrera | 1946 | 6 | 1 | 1 | 4 | 16.7% | |
| (Argentina) José Alberto Cevasco | 1948 | 8 | 3 | 4 | 1 | 37.5% | 1948 CCCF Championship 2nd place |
| (Argentina) Enrique Natalio Pascal Palomini | 1950 | 6 | 3 | 1 | 2 | 50.0% | |
| (Guatemala) Juan Francisco Aguirre | 1953 | | | | | | |
| (Argentina) Alfredo Cuevas | 1955–1957 | | | | | | |
| (Argentina) José Alberto Cevasco | 1960–1961 | | | | | | |
| (Spain) Lorenzo Ausina Tur | 1963 | | | | | | |
| (Argentina) César Viccino | 1965 | | | | | | |
| (Uruguay) Rubén Amorín | 1967 | | | | | | 1967 CONCACAF Championship |
| (Argentina) César Viccino | 1968–1969 | | | | | | |
| (Spain) Lorenzo Ausina Tur | 1969 | | | | | | |
| (Argentina) Carmelo Faraone | 1971 | | | | | | |
| (Italy) (Argentina) Afro Geronazzo | 1971–1972 | | | | | | |
| (Uruguay) Rubén Amorín | 1972 | | | | | | |
| (Chile) Néstor Valdés | 1972 | | | | | | |
| (Uruguay) Rubén Amorín | 1976 | | | | | | |
| (Argentina) Carlos Cavagnaro | 1976 | | | | | | |
| (Guatemala) Carlos Wellmann | 1976 | | | | | | |
| (Guatemala) José Ernesto Romero | 1979 | | | | | | |
| (Uruguay) Rubén Amorín | 1980 | | | | | | |
| (Argentina) Carlos Cavagnaro | 1983 | | | | | | |
| (Socialist Federal Republic of Yugoslavia) Dragoslav Šekularac | 1984–1985 | | | | | | |
| (Uruguay) Julio César Cortés | 1987 | | | | | | |
| (Guatemala) Jorge Roldán | 1988 | | | | | | |
| (Uruguay) Rubén Amorín | 1989–1990 | | | | | | |
| (Guatemala) Haroldo Cordón | 1991 | | | | | | |
| (Argentina) Miguel Angel Brindisi | 1992 | | | | | | |
| (Guatemala) Jorge Roldán | 1995 | | | | | | 1995 UNCAF Nations Cup 2nd place |
| (Argentina) Juan Ramón Verón | 1996 | 11 | 6 | 1 | 4 | 54.6% | |
| (Argentina) Horacio Cordero | 1996 | 18 | 7 | 5 | 6 | 48.1% | |
| (Argentina) Miguel Angel Brindisi | 1997–1998 | 23 | 9 | 11 | 3 | 39.1% | 1997 UNCAF Nations Cup 2nd place |
| (Argentina) Carlos Bilardo (Argentina) Eduardo Luján Manera | 1998 | 8 | 2 | 3 | 3 | 25.0% | |
| (Guatemala) Benjamín Monterroso | 1999 | 11 | 4 | 2 | 5 | 36.4% | 1999 UNCAF Nations Cup 2nd place |
| (Uruguay) Carlos Miloc | 2000 | 5 | 0 | 3 | 2 | 0.0% | |
| (Uruguay) Julio César Cortés | 2000–2003 | 33 | 13 | 12 | 7 | 39.4% | 2001 UNCAF Nations Cup; 2003 UNCAF Nations Cup (Runner-up) |
| (Mexico) Víctor Manuel Aguado | 2003 | 7 | 1 | 2 | 4 | 14.3% | |
| (Honduras) Ramón Maradiaga | 2004–2005 | 42 | 17 | 9 | 16 | 40.5% | |
| (Colombia) Hernán Darío Gómez | 2006–2008 | 21 | 5 | 4 | 12 | 23.8% | |
| (Honduras) Ramón Maradiaga | 2008 | 5 | 2 | 1 | 2 | 50.0% | |
| (Guatemala) Benjamín Monterroso | 2008–2009 | 5 | 1 | 0 | 4 | 20.0% | |
| (Uruguay) (Paraguay) Ever Hugo Almeida | 2010–2013 | 40 | 16 | 7 | 17 | 45.8% | |
| (Guatemala) Víctor Hugo Monzón | 2013 | 4 | 0 | 1 | 3 | 11.1% | |
| (Chile) Sergio Pardo | 2013-2014 | 1 | 0 | 0 | 1 | 0.0% | |
| (Argentina) Ivan Franco Sopegno | 2014–2015 | 23 | 9 | 4 | 10 | 44.9% | 2014 Copa Centroamericana (Runner-up) |
| (Guatemala) Walter Claverí | 2016–2019 | 11 | 4 | 2 | 5 | 40% | |
| (Guatemala) Amarini Villatoro | 2019–2021 | 23 | 14 | 6 | 3 | 76% | |
| (Mexico) Rafael Loredo (Interim) | 2021 | 03 | 0 | 1 | 2 | 0% | |
| (Mexico) Luis Fernando Tena | 2021–Present | 53 | 23 | 11 | 19 | 43.4% | 2023 CONCACAF Gold Cup 5th place 2025 CONCACAF Gold Cup 3rd place Final round of 2026 FIFA WC Qualifiers |

== Players ==
=== Current squad ===
The following players were called up for the friendly match against Algeria on 27 March 2026.
Caps and goals are correct as of 27 March 2026, after the match against Algeria.

| No. | Pos. | Player | Date of birth (age) | Caps | Goals | Club |
|---|---|---|---|---|---|---|
| 12 | GK | Kenderson Navarro | 25 February 2002 (age 24) | 6 | 0 | (National Football Federation of Guatemala) Municipal |
| 21 | GK | Luis Morán | 31 May 1996 (age 30) | 0 | 0 | (National Football Federation of Guatemala) Antigua |
| | DF | José Carlos Pinto (captain) | 16 June 1993 (age 33) | 78 | 4 | (National Football Federation of Guatemala) Comunicaciones |
| | DF | José Morales | 3 December 1996 (age 29) | 50 | 3 | (National Football Federation of Guatemala) Municipal |
| | DF | José Ardón | 20 January 2000 (age 26) | 37 | 1 | (National Football Federation of Guatemala) Antigua |
| 15 | DF | Allen Yanes | 4 July 1997 (age 29) | 20 | 1 | (National Football Federation of Guatemala) Mixco |
| | DF | Carlos Aguilar | 25 October 2006 (age 20) | 4 | 0 | (National Football Federation of Guatemala) Municipal |
| | DF | Marcelo Hernández | 19 November 2005 (age 20) | 1 | 0 | (Costa Rican Football Federation) Cartaginés |
| 17 | MF | Óscar Castellanos | 18 January 2000 (age 26) | 56 | 3 | (National Football Federation of Guatemala) Antigua |
| 13 | MF | Stheven Robles | 10 November 1995 (age 31) | 43 | 2 | (National Football Federation of Guatemala) Comunicaciones |
| 22 | MF | Jonathan Franco | 26 July 2003 (age 23) | 23 | 0 | (National Football Federation of Guatemala) Municipal |
| 5 | MF | José Rosales | 24 June 1993 (age 33) | 19 | 1 | (National Football Federation of Guatemala) Antigua |
| 20 | MF | Kevin Ramírez | 1 August 2002 (age 24) | 6 | 0 | (National Football Federation of Guatemala) Malacateco |
| 8 | MF | Matt Evans | 25 May 2006 (age 20) | 3 | 0 | (Austrian Football Association) Wacker Innsbruck |
| | MF | Diego Fernández | 1 November 2005 (age 21) | 0 | 0 | (National Football Federation of Guatemala) Antigua |
| 18 | FW | Óscar Santis | 25 March 1999 (age 27) | 55 | 18 | (Football Association of Brunei Darussalam) DPMM |
| 14 | FW | Darwin Lom | 14 July 1997 (age 29) | 46 | 13 | (Bolivian Football Federation) The Strongest |
| 10 | FW | Olger Escobar | 11 September 2006 (age 20) | 18 | 4 | (Canadian Soccer Association) Montréal |
| 11 | FW | Rudy Muñoz | 6 February 2005 (age 21) | 15 | 1 | (National Football Federation of Guatemala) Municipal |
| | FW | Arquímides Ordóñez | 5 August 2003 (age 23) | 12 | 1 | (United States Soccer Federation) FC Tulsa |
| | FW | Daniel Méndez | 6 February 2005 (age 21) | 0 | 0 | (Mexican Football Federation) Pachuca U21 |

=== Recent call-ups ===
The following players have been called up for the team in the last twelve months.

| Pos. | Player | Date of birth (age) | Caps | Goals | Club | Latest call-up |
|---|---|---|---|---|---|---|
| GK | Nicholas Hagen | 2 August 1996 (age 30) | 55 | 0 | (United States) Columbus Crew | v. Canada, 17 January 2026 |
| DF | Nicolás Samayoa | 2 August 1995 (age 31) | 35 | 2 | (Guatemala) Municipal | v. Canada, 17 January 2026 |
| DF | Diego Santis | 13 July 2002 (age 24) | 2 | 0 | (Guatemala) Antigua | v. Canada, 17 January 2026 |
| DF | Widvin Tebalán | 11 September 2000 (age 26) | 0 | 0 | (Guatemala) Xelajú | v. Canada, 17 January 2026 |
| DF | Héctor Prillwitz | 29 March 2006 (age 20) | 0 | 0 | (Guatemala) Antigua | v. Canada, 17 January 2026 ^{WD} |
| DF | Aaron Herrera | 6 June 1997 (age 29) | 22 | 0 | (United States) D.C. United | v. Suriname, 18 November 2025 |
| DF | Carlos Estrada | 12 September 1997 (age 29) | 1 | 0 | (Guatemala) Marquense | v. Suriname, 18 November 2025 |
| MF | Pedro Altán | 4 June 1997 (age 29) | 39 | 3 | (Guatemala) Municipal | v. Canada, 17 January 2026 |
| MF | Jefry Bantes | 8 March 2004 (age 22) | 1 | 0 | (Guatemala) Municipal | v. Canada, 17 January 2026 |
| MF | Marvin Ávila | 17 March 2008 (age 18) | 0 | 0 | (Brazil) São Paulo U20 | v. Canada, 17 January 2026 |
| MF | DeCarlo Guerra | 1 February 2008 (age 18) | 0 | 0 | (United States) Los Angeles 2 | v. Canada, 17 January 2026 ^{WD} |
| MF | Rodrigo Saravia | 22 February 1993 (age 33) | 64 | 0 | (Guatemala) Municipal | v. Suriname, 18 November 2025 |
| MF | Antonio López | 10 April 1997 (age 29) | 32 | 0 | (Guatemala) Xelajú | v. Suriname, 18 November 2025 |
| FW | Damian Rivera | 8 December 2002 (age 23) | 0 | 0 | (United States) Phoenix Rising | v. Canada, 17 January 2026 |
| FW | Rubio Rubin | 1 March 1996 (age 30) | 38 | 13 | (United States) El Paso Locomotive | v. Suriname, 18 November 2025 |
^{INJ} Player withdrew from the squad due to an injury.^{PRE} Preliminary squad.^{RET} Player retired from the national team.^{SUS} Player is serving suspension.^{WD} Player withdrew from the squad due to non-injury issue.

== Records ==
As of 7 June 2026.
Players in bold are still active with Guatemala.

=== Most appearances ===
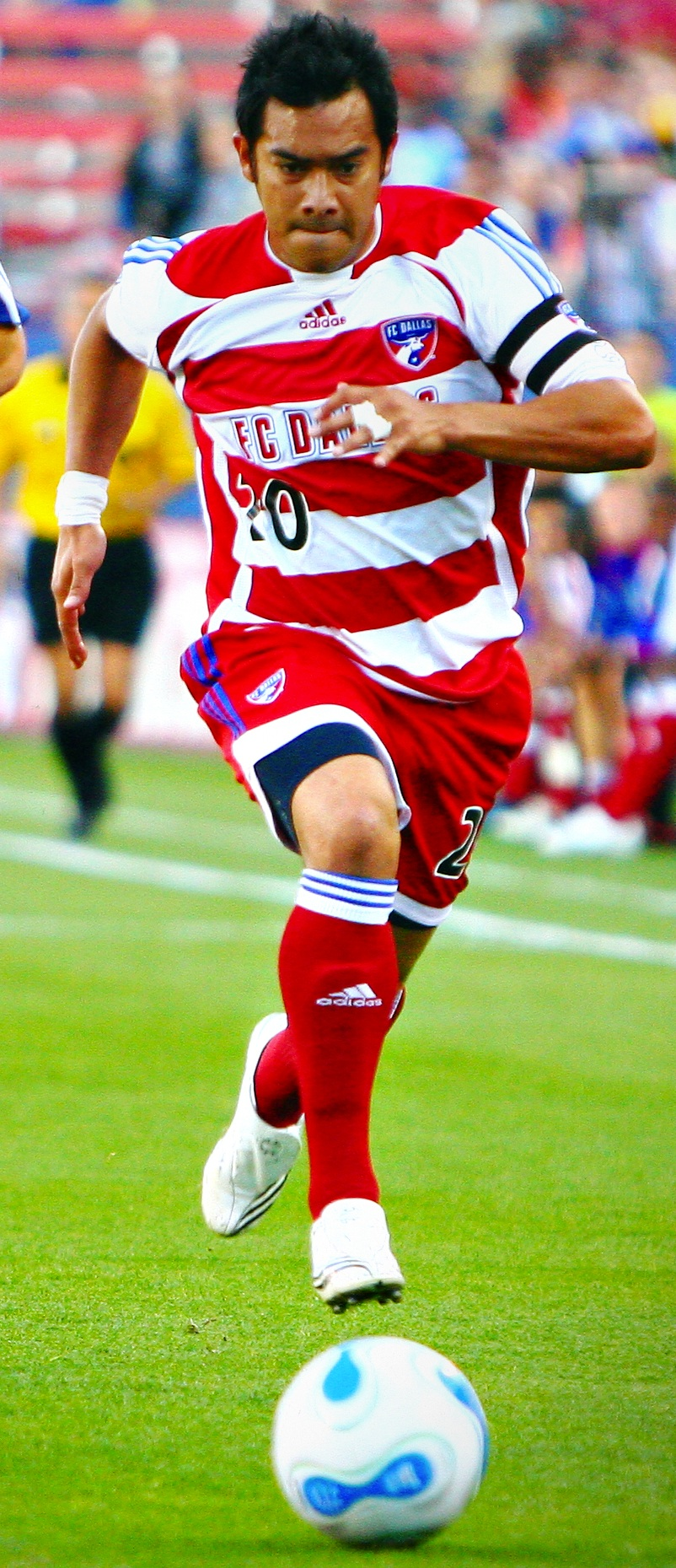
Carlos Ruiz is Guatemala's top goalscorer and their most capped player.

| Rank | Player | Caps | Goals | Career |
|---|---|---|---|---|
| 1 | Carlos Ruiz | 133 | 68 | 1998–2016 |
| 2 | Guillermo Ramírez | 106 | 16 | 1997–2012 |
| 3 | Gustavo Cabrera | 104 | 2 | 2000–2012 |
| 4 | Fredy Thompson | 96 | 3 | 2001–2015 |
| 5 | Juan Carlos Plata | 87 | 35 | 1996–2010 |
| 6 | **José Carlos Pinto** | 84 | 4 | 2016–present |
| 7 | Gonzalo Romero | 83 | 9 | 2000–2012 |
| 8 | Julio Girón | 82 | 0 | 1992–2006 |
| 9 | José Manuel Contreras | 80 | 5 | 2006–2021 |
| 9 | Edgar Estrada | 80 | 0 | 1995–2003 |

=== Top goalscorers ===
| Rank | Player | Goals | Caps | Ratio | Career |
|---|---|---|---|---|---|
| 1 | Carlos Ruiz | 68 | 133 | 0.51 | 1998–2016 |
| 2 | Juan Carlos Plata | 35 | 87 | 0.4 | 1996–2010 |
| 3 | Carlos Toledo | 25 | 17 | 1.47 | 1943–1953 |
| 4 | Mario Camposeco | 23 | 20 | 1.15 | 1943–1951 |
| 4 | Freddy García | 23 | 73 | 0.32 | 1998–2012 |
| 6 | **Óscar Santis** | 18 | 57 | 0.35 | 2021–present |
| 7 | Edwin Westphal | 16 | 47 | 0.34 | 1985–1998 |
| 7 | Dwight Pezzarossi | 16 | 72 | 0.22 | 2000–2012 |
| 7 | Guillermo Ramírez | 16 | 106 | 0.15 | 1997–2012 |
| 10 | Juan Manuel Funes | 15 | 66 | 0.23 | 1985–2000 |

== Competitive record ==
=== FIFA World Cup ===
| FIFA World Cup record | | | | | | | | | Qualification record | | | | | |
| Year | Round | Position | Pld | W | D | L | GF | GA | Pld | W | D | L | GF | GA |
|---|---|---|---|---|---|---|---|---|---|---|---|---|---|---|
| (Uruguay) 1930 | Not a FIFA member | | | | | | | | Not a FIFA member | | | | | |
| (Italy) 1934 | Not a FIFA member | | | | | | | | Not a FIFA member | | | | | |
| (France) 1938 | Not a FIFA member | | | | | | | | Not a FIFA member | | | | | |
| (Brazil) 1950 | Did not enter | | | | | | | | Did not enter | | | | | |
| (Switzerland) 1954 | Did not enter | | | | | | | | Did not enter | | | | | |
| (Sweden) 1958 | Did not qualify | | | | | | | | 3 | 0 | 0 | 3 | 4 | 12 |
| (Chile) 1962 | Did not qualify | | | | | | | | 4 | 0 | 2 | 2 | 7 | 10 |
| (England) 1966 | Entry not accepted | | | | | | | | Entry not accepted | | | | | |
| (Mexico) 1970 | Did not qualify | | | | | | | | 4 | 1 | 2 | 1 | 5 | 3 |
| (West Germany) 1974 | Did not qualify | | | | | | | | 7 | 2 | 3 | 2 | 6 | 6 |
| (Argentina) 1978 | Did not qualify | | | | | | | | 11 | 4 | 3 | 4 | 23 | 16 |
| (Spain) 1982 | Did not qualify | | | | | | | | 8 | 3 | 3 | 2 | 10 | 2 |
| (Mexico) 1986 | Did not qualify | | | | | | | | 4 | 2 | 1 | 1 | 7 | 3 |
| (Italy) 1990 | Did not qualify | | | | | | | | 10 | 3 | 2 | 5 | 9 | 11 |
| (United States) 1994 | Did not qualify | | | | | | | | 2 | 0 | 1 | 1 | 0 | 2 |
| (France) 1998 | Did not qualify | | | | | | | | 8 | 4 | 2 | 2 | 9 | 10 |
| (South Korea) (Japan) 2002 | Did not qualify | | | | | | | | 13 | 6 | 3 | 4 | 23 | 15 |
| (Germany) 2006 | Did not qualify | | | | | | | | 18 | 7 | 4 | 7 | 27 | 29 |
| (South Africa) 2010 | Did not qualify | | | | | | | | 8 | 3 | 2 | 3 | 15 | 8 |
| (Brazil) 2014 | Did not qualify | | | | | | | | 12 | 9 | 1 | 2 | 28 | 11 |
| (Russia) 2018 | Did not qualify | | | | | | | | 10 | 5 | 2 | 3 | 21 | 12 |
| (Qatar) 2022 | Did not qualify | | | | | | | | 4 | 3 | 1 | 0 | 14 | 0 |
| (Canada) (Mexico) (United States) 2026 | Did not qualify | | | | | | | | 10 | 5 | 2 | 3 | 21 | 12 |
| (Morocco) (Portugal) (Spain) 2030 | To be determined | | | | | | | | To be determined | | | | | |
| (Saudi Arabia) 2034 | To be determined | | | | | | | | To be determined | | | | | |
| Total | – | 0/20 | – | – | – | – | – | – | 136 | 57 | 34 | 45 | 229 | 162 |

=== CONCACAF Gold Cup ===
| CONCACAF Championship & Gold Cup record | | | | | | | | | | Qualification record | | | | | |
| Year | Round | Position | Pld | W | D* | L | GF | GA | Squad | Pld | W | D | L | GF | GA |
|---|---|---|---|---|---|---|---|---|---|---|---|---|---|---|---|
| (El Salvador) 1963 | Round 1 | 6th | 4 | 1 | 2 | 1 | 7 | 6 | Squad | Qualified automatically | | | | | |
| (Guatemala) 1965 | Runners-up | 2nd | 5 | 3 | 1 | 1 | 11 | 5 | Squad | Qualified as hosts | | | | | |
| (Honduras) 1967 | Champions | 1st | 5 | 4 | 1 | 0 | 7 | 1 | Squad | 2 | 2 | 0 | 0 | 6 | 2 |
| (Costa Rica) 1969 | Runners-up | 2nd | 5 | 3 | 2 | 0 | 10 | 2 | Squad | Qualified as defending champions | | | | | |
| (Trinidad and Tobago) 1971 | Did not qualify | | | | | | | | | 2 | 0 | 1 | 1 | 1 | 2 |
| (Haiti) 1973 | Fifth place | 5th | 5 | 0 | 3 | 2 | 4 | 6 | Squad | 2 | 2 | 0 | 0 | 2 | 0 |
| (Mexico) 1977 | Fifth place | 5th | 5 | 1 | 1 | 3 | 8 | 10 | Squad | 6 | 3 | 2 | 1 | 15 | 6 |
| (Honduras) 1981 | Did not qualify | | | | | | | | | 8 | 3 | 3 | 2 | 10 | 2 |
| 1985 | Round 1 | 5th | 4 | 2 | 1 | 1 | 7 | 3 | Squad | Qualified automatically | | | | | |
| 1989 | Fourth place | 4th | 6 | 1 | 1 | 4 | 4 | 7 | Squad | 4 | 2 | 1 | 1 | 5 | 4 |
| (United States) 1991 | Group stage | 7th | 3 | 1 | 0 | 2 | 1 | 5 | Squad | 3 | 0 | 2 | 1 | 0 | 1 |
| (Mexico) (United States) 1993 | Did not enter | | | | | | | | | Did not enter | | | | | |
| (United States) 1996 | Fourth place | 4th | 4 | 1 | 0 | 3 | 3 | 5 | Squad | 4 | 2 | 0 | 2 | 2 | 5 |
| (United States) 1998 | Group stage | 7th | 3 | 0 | 2 | 1 | 3 | 4 | Squad | 5 | 3 | 2 | 0 | 10 | 3 |
| (United States) 2000 | Group stage | 10th | 2 | 0 | 1 | 1 | 3 | 5 | Squad | 5 | 3 | 1 | 1 | 5 | 2 |
| (United States) 2002 | Group stage | 12th | 2 | 0 | 0 | 2 | 1 | 4 | Squad | 5 | 2 | 3 | 0 | 9 | 5 |
| (Mexico) (United States) 2003 | Group stage | 11th | 2 | 0 | 1 | 1 | 1 | 3 | Squad | 5 | 3 | 1 | 1 | 10 | 4 |
| (United States) 2005 | Group stage | 11th | 3 | 0 | 1 | 2 | 4 | 9 | Squad | 5 | 3 | 1 | 1 | 10 | 5 |
| (United States) 2007 | Quarter-finals | 8th | 4 | 1 | 1 | 2 | 2 | 5 | Squad | 5 | 3 | 1 | 1 | 3 | 2 |
| (United States) 2009 | Did not qualify | | | | | | | | | 3 | 0 | 0 | 3 | 1 | 6 |
| (United States) 2011 | Quarter-finals | 8th | 4 | 1 | 1 | 2 | 5 | 4 | Squad | 3 | 1 | 0 | 2 | 3 | 6 |
| (United States) 2013 | Did not qualify | | | | | | | | | 4 | 0 | 3 | 1 | 3 | 5 |
| (Canada) (United States) 2015 | Group stage | 12th | 3 | 0 | 1 | 2 | 1 | 4 | Squad | 4 | 3 | 0 | 1 | 7 | 4 |
| (United States) 2017 | Disqualified due to FIFA suspension | | | | | | | | | Disqualified due to FIFA suspension | | | | | |
| (Costa Rica) (Jamaica) (United States) 2019 | Disqualified due to FIFA suspension | | | | | | | | | Disqualified due to FIFA suspension | | | | | |
| (United States) 2021 | Group stage | 13th | 3 | 0 | 1 | 2 | 1 | 6 | Squad | 6 | 5 | 1 | 0 | 30 | 1 |
| (Canada) (United States) 2023 | Quarter-finals | 5th | 4 | 2 | 1 | 1 | 4 | 3 | Squad | 6 | 4 | 1 | 1 | 11 | 4 |
| (Canada) (United States) 2025 | Semi-finals | 3rd | 5 | 2 | 1 | 2 | 6 | 6 | Squad | 6 | 3 | 1 | 2 | 10 | 8 |
| 2027 | To be determined | | | | | | | | | To be determined | | | | | |
| Total | 1 Title | 21/28 | 81 | 23 | 23 | 35 | 93 | 103 | — | 93 | 47 | 24 | 22 | 153 | 77 |

CONCACAF Championship & Gold Cup history
| First match | Guatemala 2–1 Honduras (23 March 1963; San Salvador, El Salvador) |
| Biggest win | Guatemala 6–1 Netherlands Antilles (29 November 1969; San José, Costa Rica) |
| Biggest defeat | Mexico 4–0 Guatemala (9 July 2005; Los Angeles, United States) |
| Best result | Champions (1967) |
| Worst result | Group stage (1991, 1998, 2000, 2002, 2003, 2005, 2015, 2021) |

=== CONCACAF Nations League ===
CONCACAF Nations League record
| League phase / Quarter-finals | | | | | | | | | | Finals | | | | | | | | |
| Season | Division | Group | Pld | W | D | L | GF | GA | P/R | Year | Result | Pld | W | D | L | GF | GA | Squad |
|---|---|---|---|---|---|---|---|---|---|---|---|---|---|---|---|---|---|---|
| 2019–20 | C | C | 4 | 4 | 0 | 0 | 25 | 0 | ▲ | (United States) 2021 | Ineligible | | | | | | | |
| 2022–23 | B | D | 6 | 4 | 1 | 1 | 11 | 4 | ▲ | (United States) 2023 | Ineligible | | | | | | | |
| 2023–24 | A | A | 4 | 1 | 1 | 2 | 5 | 7 | Same position | (United States) 2024 | Did not qualify | | | | | | | |
| 2024–25 | A | A | 4 | 2 | 1 | 1 | 6 | 5 | Same position | (United States) 2025 | Did not qualify | | | | | | | |
| 2026–27 | A | B | 6 | 2 | 1 | 3 | 12 | 10 | Same position | (United States) 2027 | Did not qualify | | | | | | | |
| Total | — | — | 24 | 13 | 4 | 7 | 59 | 26 | — | Total | 0 Titles | — | — | — | — | — | — | — |

CONCACAF Nations League history
| First match | Guatemala 10–0 Anguilla (5 September 2019; Guatemala City, Guatemala) |
| Biggest win | Guatemala 10–0 Anguilla (5 September 2019; Guatemala City, Guatemala) |
| Biggest defeat | Panama 3–0 Guatemala (17 October 2023; Panama City, Panama); Costa Rica 3–0 Guatemala (11 October 2024; San José, Costa Rica) |
| Best result | — |
| Worst result | — |

=== Copa Centroamericana ===
Copa Centroamericana record
| Year | Round | Position | Pld | W | D | L | GF | GA |
|---|---|---|---|---|---|---|---|---|
| (Costa Rica) 1991 | Third place | 3rd | 3 | 0 | 2 | 1 | 0 | 1 |
| (Honduras) 1993 | Did not enter | | | | | | | |
| (El Salvador) 1995 | Runners-up | 2nd | 4 | 2 | 0 | 2 | 2 | 5 |
| (Guatemala) 1997 | Runners-up | 2nd | 5 | 3 | 2 | 0 | 10 | 3 |
| (Costa Rica) 1999 | Runners-up | 2nd | 5 | 3 | 1 | 1 | 5 | 2 |
| (Honduras) 2001 | Champions | 1st | 5 | 2 | 3 | 0 | 9 | 5 |
| (Panama) 2003 | Runners-up | 2nd | 5 | 3 | 1 | 1 | 10 | 4 |
| (Guatemala) 2005 | Third place | 3rd | 5 | 3 | 1 | 1 | 10 | 5 |
| (El Salvador) 2007 | Third place | 3rd | 5 | 3 | 1 | 1 | 3 | 2 |
| (Honduras) 2009 | Round 1 | 6th | 3 | 0 | 0 | 3 | 1 | 6 |
| (Panama) 2011 | Fifth place | 5th | 3 | 1 | 0 | 2 | 3 | 6 |
| (Costa Rica) 2013 | Sixth place | 6th | 4 | 0 | 3 | 1 | 3 | 5 |
| (United States) 2014 | Runners-up | 2nd | 4 | 3 | 0 | 1 | 7 | 4 |
| (Panama) 2017 | Disqualified due to FIFA suspension | | | | | | | |
| Total | 1 Title | 12/14 | 51 | 23 | 14 | 14 | 63 | 48 |

=== CCCF Championship ===
CCCF Championship record
| Year | Round | Position | Pld | W | D | L | GF | GA |
|---|---|---|---|---|---|---|---|---|
| (Costa Rica) 1941 | Did not enter | | | | | | | |
| (El Salvador) 1943 | Runners-up | 2nd | 6 | 4 | 1 | 1 | 21 | 11 |
| (Costa Rica) 1946 | Runners-up | 2nd | 5 | 3 | 1 | 1 | 20 | 10 |
| (Guatemala) 1948 | Runners-up | 2nd | 8 | 3 | 4 | 1 | 20 | 16 |
| (Panama) 1951 | Did not enter | | | | | | | |
| (Costa Rica) 1953 | Third place | 3rd | 6 | 3 | 2 | 1 | 8 | 8 |
| (Honduras) 1955 | Sixth place | 6th | 6 | 1 | 0 | 5 | 6 | 9 |
| (Netherlands Antilles) 1957 | Did not enter | | | | | | | |
| (Cuba) 1960 | Did not enter | | | | | | | |
| (Costa Rica) 1961 | Round 1 | 5th | 4 | 2 | 0 | 2 | 7 | 7 |
| Total | Runners-up | 6/10 | 35 | 16 | 8 | 11 | 82 | 61 |

=== Olympic Games ===
Olympic Games record
| Year | Round | Position | Pld | W | D | L | GF | GA | Squad |
|---|---|---|---|---|---|---|---|---|---|
| (France) 1900 | Only club teams participated | | | | | | | | |
| (United States) 1904 | Only club teams participated | | | | | | | | |
| (United Kingdom) 1908 | No national representative | | | | | | | | |
| (Sweden) 1912 | No national representative | | | | | | | | |
| (Belgium) 1920 | Not an IOC member | | | | | | | | |
| (France) 1924 | Not an IOC member | | | | | | | | |
| (Netherlands) 1928 | Not an IOC member | | | | | | | | |
| (Nazi Germany) 1936 | Not an IOC member | | | | | | | | |
| (United Kingdom) 1948 | Did not participate | | | | | | | | |
| (Finland) 1952 | Did not participate | | | | | | | | |
| (Australia) 1956 | Did not participate | | | | | | | | |
| (Italy) 1960 | Did not participate | | | | | | | | |
| (Japan) 1964 | Did not participate | | | | | | | | |
| (Mexico) 1968 | Quarter-finals | 8th | 4 | 2 | 0 | 2 | 6 | 4 | Squad |
| (West Germany) 1972 | Did not qualify | | | | | | | | |
| (Canada) 1976 | Group stage | 10th | 3 | 0 | 2 | 1 | 2 | 5 | Squad |
| (Soviet Union) 1980 | Did not qualify | | | | | | | | |
| (United States) 1984 | Did not qualify | | | | | | | | |
| (South Korea) 1988 | Group stage | 16th | 3 | 0 | 0 | 3 | 2 | 12 | Squad |
| Since 1992 | Under-23 national teams participated | | | | | | | | |
| Total | Quarter-finals | 3/11 | 3 | 0 | 1 | 2 | 2 | 8 | — |

Note: Football at the Summer Olympics has been an under-23 tournament since 1992.

=== Central American and Caribbean Games ===
Central American and Caribbean Games record
| Year | Round | Position | Pld | W | D | L | GF | GA |
|---|---|---|---|---|---|---|---|---|
| (Cuba) 1930 | Round 1 | 6th | 2 | 0 | 0 | 2 | 3 | 16 |
| (El Salvador) 1935 | Sixth place | 6th | 5 | 0 | 1 | 4 | 6 | 17 |
| (Panama) 1938 | Did not qualify | | | | | | | |
| (Colombia) 1946 | Sixth place | 6th | 6 | 1 | 1 | 4 | 12 | 20 |
| (Guatemala) 1950 | Silver medal | 2nd | 5 | 2 | 1 | 2 | 4 | 4 |
| (Mexico) 1954 | Did not qualify | | | | | | | |
| (Venezuela) 1959 | Did not qualify | | | | | | | |
| (Jamaica) 1962 | Did not qualify | | | | | | | |
| (Puerto Rico) 1966 | Fourth place | 4th | 5 | 1 | 2 | 2 | 5 | 9 |
| (Panama) 1970 | Did not qualify | | | | | | | |
| (Dominican Republic) 1974 | Did not qualify | | | | | | | |
| (Colombia) 1978 | Did not qualify | | | | | | | |
| (Cuba) 1982 | Did not qualify | | | | | | | |
| (Dominican Republic) 1986 | Withdrew | | | | | | | |
| Since 1990 | Youth teams participated | | | | | | | |
| Total | 1 Silver medal | 5/14 | 23 | 4 | 5 | 14 | 30 | 66 |

== Head-to-head record ==
As of 16 November 2026.

Positive Record Neutral Record Negative Record

| Opponents | Pld | W | D | L | GF | GA | GD |
|---|---|---|---|---|---|---|---|
| Algeria | 1 | 0 | 0 | 1 | 0 | 7 | −7 |
| Anguilla | 2 | 2 | 0 | 0 | 15 | 0 | +15 |
| Antigua and Barbuda | 8 | 7 | 0 | 1 | 29 | 3 | +26 |
| Argentina | 4 | 0 | 0 | 4 | 1 | 17 | −16 |
| Armenia | 2 | 0 | 1 | 1 | 2 | 8 | −6 |
| Barbados | 3 | 2 | 1 | 0 | 5 | 1 | +4 |
| Belize | 13 | 9 | 4 | 0 | 23 | 10 | +13 |
| Bermuda | 6 | 2 | 4 | 0 | 4 | 2 | +2 |
| Bolivia | 5 | 3 | 1 | 1 | 7 | 5 | +2 |
| Brazil | 2 | 0 | 1 | 1 | 1 | 4 | −3 |
| British Virgin Islands | 2 | 2 | 0 | 0 | 6 | 0 | +6 |
| Canada | 18 | 2 | 4 | 12 | 14 | 30 | −16 |
| Chile | 5 | 1 | 1 | 3 | 4 | 9 | −5 |
| Colombia | 6 | 1 | 2 | 3 | 8 | 15 | −7 |
| Costa Rica | 67 | 17 | 18 | 32 | 78 | 131 | −53 |
| Cuba | 20 | 10 | 7 | 3 | 25 | 13 | +12 |
| Curaçao (Note: Includes matches against the Netherlands Antilles.) | 12 | 3 | 7 | 2 | 24 | 19 | +5 |
| Czech Republic | 1 | 0 | 0 | 1 | 1 | 3 | −2 |
| Dominica | 1 | 1 | 0 | 0 | 6 | 0 | +6 |
| Dominican Republic | 4 | 2 | 2 | 0 | 7 | 3 | +4 |
| Ecuador | 11 | 2 | 3 | 6 | 4 | 14 | −10 |
| El Salvador | 90 | 40 | 27 | 23 | 110 | 75 | +35 |
| French Guiana | 2 | 1 | 0 | 1 | 4 | 2 | +2 |
| Grenada | 3 | 3 | 0 | 0 | 11 | 1 | +10 |
| Guadeloupe | 3 | 2 | 1 | 0 | 7 | 5 | +2 |
| Guyana | 8 | 7 | 0 | 1 | 25 | 4 | +21 |
| Haiti | 17 | 10 | 2 | 5 | 27 | 17 | +10 |
| Honduras | 52 | 14 | 18 | 20 | 58 | 61 | −3 |
| Iceland | 1 | 0 | 0 | 1 | 0 | 1 | −1 |
| Iran | 1 | 0 | 1 | 0 | 2 | 2 | 0 |
| Iraq | 1 | 0 | 0 | 1 | 0 | 3 | −3 |
| Israel | 2 | 0 | 1 | 1 | 0 | 7 | −7 |
| Italy | 1 | 0 | 0 | 1 | 2 | 5 | −3 |
| Jamaica | 23 | 5 | 5 | 13 | 22 | 37 | −15 |
| Japan | 2 | 0 | 0 | 2 | 1 | 5 | −4 |
| Martinique | 1 | 1 | 0 | 0 | 3 | 1 | +2 |
| Mexico | 37 | 4 | 10 | 23 | 28 | 70 | −42 |
| Nicaragua | 28 | 21 | 5 | 2 | 74 | 18 | +56 |
| Norway | 1 | 0 | 0 | 1 | 1 | 3 | −2 |
| Panama | 44 | 13 | 12 | 19 | 65 | 67 | −2 |
| Paraguay | 11 | 0 | 2 | 9 | 10 | 25 | −15 |
| Peru | 4 | 0 | 1 | 3 | 2 | 8 | −6 |
| Poland | 2 | 0 | 1 | 1 | 2 | 3 | −1 |
| Puerto Rico | 4 | 4 | 0 | 0 | 15 | 1 | +14 |
| Qatar | 1 | 0 | 0 | 1 | 0 | 2 | −2 |
| Russia (Note: Includes matches against the Soviet Union.) | 1 | 0 | 0 | 1 | 0 | 3 | −3 |
| Saint Lucia | 2 | 2 | 0 | 0 | 9 | 1 | +8 |
| Saint Vincent and the Grenadines | 6 | 6 | 0 | 0 | 33 | 3 | +30 |
| South Africa | 2 | 0 | 1 | 1 | 1 | 6 | −5 |
| South Korea | 3 | 1 | 1 | 1 | 3 | 4 | −1 |
| Suriname | 9 | 4 | 4 | 1 | 14 | 9 | +5 |
| Slovakia | 1 | 0 | 0 | 1 | 0 | 1 | −1 |
| Thailand | 1 | 1 | 0 | 0 | 4 | 1 | +3 |
| Trinidad and Tobago | 27 | 8 | 9 | 10 | 43 | 37 | +6 |
| United States | 28 | 5 | 6 | 17 | 20 | 49 | −29 |
| Uruguay | 3 | 0 | 1 | 2 | 3 | 8 | −5 |
| Venezuela | 9 | 2 | 2 | 5 | 9 | 11 | −2 |
| Zambia | 1 | 0 | 0 | 1 | 0 | 4 | −4 |
| Total (58) | 626 | 220 | 166 | 240 | 872 | 854 | +18 |

== Honours ==
=== Continental ===
- CONCACAF Championship
  - Champions (1): 1967
  - (silver) Runners-up (2): 1965, 1969

=== Subcontinental ===
- CCCF Championship (Note: Official competition organized by CCCF, the former subcontinental confederation affiliated with FIFA as the governing body of football in the Central American and Caribbean Zones (1938–1961), and a direct predecessor of CONCACAF.)
  - (silver) Runners-up (3): 1943, 1946, 1948
  - (bronze) Third place (1): 1953
- Copa de Naciones UNCAF / Copa Centroamericana
  - (gold) Champions (1): 2001
  - (silver) Runners-up (5): 1995, 1997, 1999, 2003, 2014
  - (bronze) Third place (3): 1991, 2005, 2007
- Central American and Caribbean Games
  - (silver) Silver medal (1): 1950

=== Friendly ===
- Marlboro Cup (1): 1988–III

=== Summary ===
Including honours in competitions directly organized/recognized by FIFA or an affiliated confederation.

| Competition | 1st place, gold medalist(s) | 2nd place, silver medalist(s) | 3rd place, bronze medalist(s) | Total |
|---|---|---|---|---|
| CONCACAF Championship | 1 | 2 | 0 | 3 |
| CCCF Championship | 0 | 3 | 1 | 4 |
| Total | 1 | 5 | 1 | 7 |

== Notes ==
1. National Football Teams awards a goal to Oscar Santis on 21 March 2025 against Guyana, however CONCACAF awards this goal to José Martínez.

== See also ==
- Guatemala women's national football team
- Guatemala national under-20 football team
- Guatemala national under-17 football team
