= 2006 FIFA World Cup qualification (CONCACAF–AFC play-off) =

2006 FIFA World Cup qualification (CONCACAF–AFC playoff)
- Event: 2006 FIFA World Cup qualification
Trinidad and Tobago	Bahrain
(Trinidad and Tobago)	(Bahrain)
2	1
- Trinidad and Tobago won 2–1 on aggregate

First leg
Trinidad and Tobago	Bahrain
1	1
- Date: 12 November 2005
- Venue: Hasely Crawford Stadium, Port of Spain
- Referee: Mark Shield (Australia)
- Attendance: 24,991
- Weather: Mostly cloudy 27 °C (81 °F)

Second leg
Bahrain	Trinidad and Tobago
0	1
- Date: 16 November 2005
- Venue: Bahrain National Stadium, Riffa
- Referee: Óscar Ruiz (Colombia)
- Attendance: 35,000
- Weather: Clear; 25 °C (77 °F)

The 2006 FIFA World Cup CONCACAF–AFC qualification playoff was a home-and-away playoff between the following teams:

- The fourth-place team in the CONCACAF qualifying tournament, Trinidad and Tobago.
- The fifth-place team of the AFC qualifying tournament, Bahrain.

The draw for determining the order of the home-and-away legs was made at a FIFA congress on 10 September 2005.

Trinidad and Tobago was awarded a place in 2006 FIFA World Cup after winning the playoff 2–1 on aggregate.

== Play-off match ==
=== First leg ===
12 November 2005
18:30 UTC-4

Trinidad and Tobago	1–1	Bahrain
Birchall 76'	(Report)	Isa 72'

Hasely Crawford Stadium, Port of Spain
Attendance: 24,991
Referee: Mark Shield (Australia)

Trinidad and Tobago
Bahrain

=== Second leg ===
16 November 2005
19:00 UTC+3

Bahrain	0–1	Trinidad and Tobago
	(Report)	Lawrence 49'

Bahrain National Stadium, Riffa
Attendance: 35,000
Referee: Óscar Ruiz (Colombia)

Bahrain
Trinidad and Tobago
