= 2022 Costa Rican Cup =

Torneo de Copa 2022
- Tournament logo

Tournament details
- Country: Costa Rica
- Dates: 15 November–21 December
- Teams: 16

Final positions
- Champions: Cartaginés
- Runners-up: Herediano
- Semifinalists: Alajuelense; Saprissa

Tournament statistics
- Matches played: 30
- Goals scored: 100 (3.33 per match)
- Top goal scorer: Javon East (5 goals)
- All statistics correct as of 22 December 2022.

The 2022 Costa Rican Cup (known as Torneo de Copa 2022 Suerox for sponsorship reasons) was the 4th staging of the Costa Rican Cup, and the first edition since 2015, following a seven-year hiatus. The tournament was dedicated to Anthony Vargas, goalkeeping coach for Guadalupe who had died from a heart attack during a training session in October 2022, aged 29.

The tournament featured all twelve teams from the Liga FPD plus four sides from the Segunda División de Costa Rica. The format consisted in a knockout tournament, starting from the Round 16 to the final, with all stages (including the final) being double-legged.

Cartaginés, who entered the tournament as the most recent champions after winning the 2015 edition, won the cup by defeating Herediano in the finals. It is the third consecutive time that Cartaginés wins the Costa Rican Cup.

== Participating teams ==
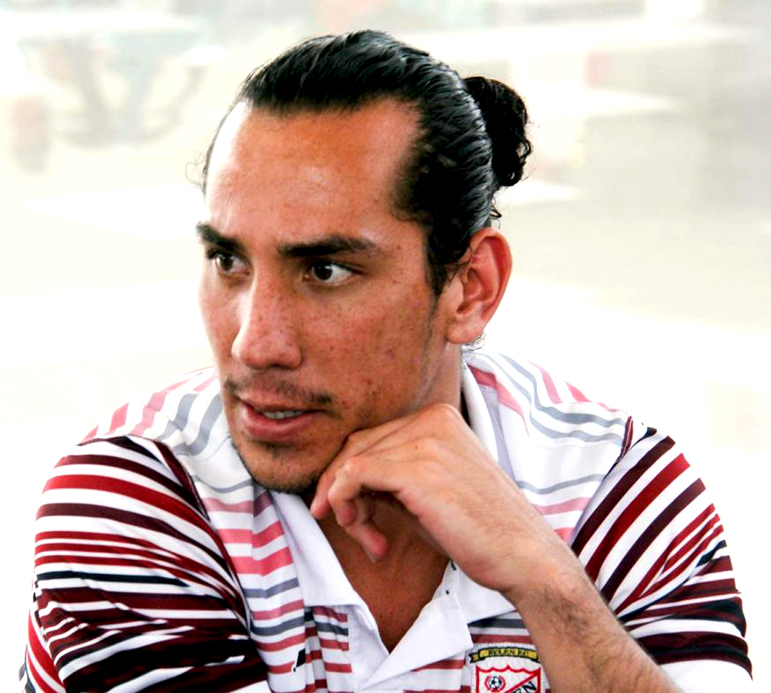
Anthony Vargas, Guadalupe's goalkeeping coach, died during a training session three weeks before the tournament, and the Cup is dedicated to his memory

Sixteen teams will participate in the 2022 Costa Rican Cup.

All twelve teams from the 2022–23 Liga FPD season:

- Alajuelense
- Cartaginés
- Grecia
- Guadalupe
- Herediano
- Guanacasteca
- Pérez Zeledón
- Puntarenas
- San Carlos
- Santos
- Saprissa
- Sporting

Four teams from the 2022–23 Liga de Ascenso season:

- Santa Ana
- Sarchí
- Turrialba
- Uruguay de Coronado

== Bracket ==
The bracket is divided into two sub-brackets, named Bracket A and Bracket B.

Round of 16
A1 | Herediano | 3 | 0 | 3
A2 | Santa Ana | 0 | 0 | 0
A3 | Guadalupe | 1 | 1 | 2 (10)
A4 | Puntarenas (p) | 1 | 1 | 2 (11)
A5 | Grecia | 0 | 3 | 3
A6 | Sarchí | 0 | 1 | 1
A7 | Alajuelense | 2 | 1 | 3
A8 | Guanacasteca | 1 | 0 | 1
B1 | Saprissa | 4 | 2 | 6
B2 | Uruguay | 0 | 0 | 0
B3 | Santos (p) | 4 | 1 | 5 (3)
B4 | San Carlos | 1 | 4 | 5 (2)
B5 | Cartaginés | 1 | 1 | 2
B6 | Turrialba | 0 | 0 | 0
B7 | Pérez Zeledón | 0 | 1 | 1
B8 | Sporting | 1 | 4 | 5

Quarter-finals
Herediano | 1 | 2 | 3
Puntarenas | 0 | 0 | 0
Grecia | 2 | 0 | 2
Alajuelense | 1 | 5 | 6
Saprissa | 3 | 1 | 4
Santos | 0 | 1 | 1
Cartaginés | 1 | 2 | 3
Sporting | 1 | 1 | 2

Semi-finals
Herediano | 1 | 1 | 2
Alajuelense | 1 | 0 | 1
Saprissa | 0 | 1 | 1
Cartaginés | 2 | 2 | 4

Final
Herediano | 2 | 0 | 2
Cartaginés | 1 | 2 | 3

== Round of 16 ==
=== Summary ===
Bracket A

The first legs were played on 15–17 November, and the second legs were played on 25–27 November.

| Team 1 | Agg. | Team 2 | 1st leg | 2nd leg |
|---|---|---|---|---|
| Herediano | 3–0 | Santa Ana | 3–0 | 0–0 |
| Guadalupe | 2–2 (10–11 p) | Puntarenas | 1–1 | 1–1 |
| Sarchí | 1–3 | Grecia | 0–0 | 1–3 |
| Alajuelense | 3–1 | Guanacasteca | 2–1 | 1–0 |

Bracket B

The first legs were played on 18–20 November, and the second legs were played on 22–24 November.

| Team 1 | Agg. | Team 2 | 1st leg | 2nd leg |
|---|---|---|---|---|
| Uruguay | 0–6 (Note: Order of legs reversed after original draw.) | Saprissa | 0–4 | 0–2 |
| Santos | 5–5 (3–2 p) | San Carlos | 4–1 | 1–4 |
| Turrialba | 0–2 | Cartaginés | 0–1 | 0–1 |
| Sporting | 5–1 | Pérez Zeledón | 1–0 | 4–1 |

=== Matches ===
Bracket A

15 November 2022
(20:00 UTC-6)

| Herediano | 3–0 | Santa Ana |
|---|---|---|
| Franco 12'; Brenes 50'; Ruiz 56' | Report |

"Coyella" Fonseca, Guadalupe (Note: Herediano are playing their home matches at the "Coyella" Fonseca stadium during the reconstruction of the Estadio Eladio Rosabal Cordero.)
Attendance: 500
Referee: Esteban Fallas
26 November 2022
(20:00 UTC-6)

| Santa Ana | 0–0 | Herediano |
|---|---|---|
| | Report |

Estadio de Piedades, Santa Ana
Attendance: 300
Referee: Kevin Ruiz

Herediano won 3–0 on aggregate.

17 November 2022
(20:00 UTC-6)

| Guadalupe | 1–1 | Puntarenas |
|---|---|---|
| A. Murillo 9' | Report | Montenegro 6' |

"Coyella" Fonseca, Guadalupe
Attendance: 300
Referee: William Mattus (Note: Not to be confused with his father, former referee William Mattus.)
25 November 2022
(21:00 UTC-6)

| Puntarenas | 1–1 | Guadalupe |
|---|---|---|
| Sancho 40' | Report | Mora 19' |
Penalties
| Gibbons (penalty missed); Pérez (penalty scored); Vega (penalty scored); J. Hernández (penalty scored); Fernández (penalty scored); Sancho (penalty scored); Y. Hernández (penalty scored); K. Ramírez (penalty scored); K. Gómez (penalty missed); Duarte (penalty scored); Barrera (penalty scored); Gibbons (penalty scored); Pérez (penalty scored) | 11–10 | (penalty scored) J. Cordero; (penalty scored) Ayala; (penalty scored) Juárez; (penalty missed) Azofeifa; (penalty scored) Pemberton; (penalty scored) A. Gómez; (penalty scored) F. Ramírez; (penalty scored) Mora; (penalty missed) Gutiérrez; (penalty scored) Araya; (penalty scored) Barrientos; (penalty scored) J. Cordero; (penalty missed) Ayala |

Lito Pérez, Puntarenas
Attendance: 500
Referee: Hugo Cruz

Tied 2–2 on aggregate, Puntarenas won on penalties and advanced to the quarter-finals.

16 November 2022
(15:00 UTC-6)

| Sarchí | 0–0 | Grecia |
|---|---|---|
| | Report |

Eliécer Pérez Conejo, Sarchí Norte
Attendance: 70
Referee: Josué Ugalde
27 November 2022
(16:00 UTC-6)

| Grecia | 3–1 | Sarchí |
|---|---|---|
| Lesme 9', 56'; Evans 50' | Report | Morera 33' |

Allen Riggioni, Grecia
Attendance: 500
Referee: Ricardo Montero

Grecia won 3–1 on aggregate.

16 November 2022
(20:00 UTC-6)

| Alajuelense | 2–1 | Guanacasteca |
|---|---|---|
| Alcócer 15'; D. Rodríguez 82' | Report | Johnson 49' |

Alejandro Morera Soto, Alajuela
Attendance: 500
Referee: Bryan Cruz
26 November 2022
(16:00 UTC-6)

| Guanacasteca | 0–1 | Alajuelense |
|---|---|---|
| | Report | Suárez 40' |

Estadio Chorotega, Nicoya
Attendance: 100
Referee: Juan Gabriel Calderón

Alajuelense won 3–1 on aggregate.

Bracket B

19 November 2022
(19:00 UTC-6)

| Uruguay | 0–4 | Saprissa |
|---|---|---|
| | Report | Hadden 27'; Angulo 37'; Bolaños 75'; East 86' |

"Coyella" Fonseca, Guadalupe (Note: On 15 November 2022, Uruguay announced they moved their home fixture against Saprissa to the "Coyella" Fonseca stadium, due to their home ground El Labrador not fulfilling UNAFUT's requirements.)
Attendance: 1,000
Referee: Marco Guido
23 November 2022
(19:00 UTC-6)

| Saprissa | 2–0 | Uruguay |
|---|---|---|
| Reyes 14'; East 77' | Report |

Edgardo Baltodano Briceño, Liberia (Note: Saprissa moved its home venue for this second leg to the Edgardo Baltodano stadium in Liberia to approach their fans in the Guanacaste province)
Attendance: 100
Referee: Jonathan Leitón

Saprissa won 6–0 on aggregate.

19 November 2022
(19:00 UTC-6)

| Santos | 4–1 | San Carlos |
|---|---|---|
| Zamora 12'; Matarrita 22', 82'; Solórzano 38' | Report | McDonald 64' |

Ebal Rodríguez, Guápiles
Attendance: 20
Referee: Steven Madrigal
24 November 2022
(21:00 UTC-6)

| San Carlos | 4–1 | Santos |
|---|---|---|
| Chirino 4', 48'; Piedra 28'; Pérez 59' | Report | Solórzano 37' |
Penalties
| McDonald (penalty missed); Román (penalty scored); Pérez (penalty missed); Zúñiga (penalty scored); Mena (penalty missed) | 2–3 | (penalty missed) Mason; (penalty scored) Hernández; (penalty scored) I. Salas; (penalty scored) Palma; (penalty missed) Matarrita |

Carlos Ugalde, Ciudad Quesada
Attendance: Unknown
Referee: Benjamín Pineda

Tied 5–5 on aggregate, Santos won on penalties and advanced to the quarter-finals.

20 November 2022
(15:00 UTC-6)

| Turrialba | 0–1 | Cartaginés |
|---|---|---|
| | Report | Guevara 31' |

Rafael Ángel Camacho, Turrialba
Attendance: 500
Referee: Roy Monge
24 November 2022
(19:00 UTC-6)

| Cartaginés | 1–0 | Turrialba |
|---|---|---|
| Ureña 25' | Report |

"Fello" Meza, Cartago
Attendance: 10
Referee: Keylor Herrera

Cartaginés won 2–0 on aggregate.

20 November 2022
(20:00 UTC-6)

| Sporting | 1–0 | Pérez Zeledón |
|---|---|---|
| Martínez 7' | Report |

Ernesto Rohrmoser, Pavas
Attendance: 500
Referee: Raúl Eduarte
22 November 2022
(19:00 UTC-6)

| Pérez Zeledón | 1–4 | Sporting |
|---|---|---|
| Monge 83' | Report | Martínez 6'; Aguirre 10'; Vega 15'; W. Madrigal 88' |

Estadio Municipal, San Isidro de El General
Attendance: 200
Referee: Pedro Navarro

Sporting won 5–1 on aggregate.

== Quarterfinals ==
=== Summary ===
Bracket A

The first legs were played on 30 November, and the second legs were played on 4 December.

| Team 1 | Agg. | Team 2 | 1st leg | 2nd leg |
|---|---|---|---|---|
| Herediano | 3–0 | Puntarenas | 1–0 | 2–0 |
| Grecia | 2–6 | Alajuelense | 2–1 | 0–5 |

Bracket B

The first legs were played on 29 November, and the second legs were played on 3 December.

| Team 1 | Agg. | Team 2 | 1st leg | 2nd leg |
|---|---|---|---|---|
| Saprissa | 4–1 | Santos | 3–0 | 1–1 |
| Cartaginés | 3–2 (Note: Order of legs reversed after original draw.) | Sporting | 1–1 | 2–1 |

=== Matches ===
Bracket A

30 November 2022
(19:00 UTC-6)

| Herediano | 1–0 | Puntarenas |
|---|---|---|
| Ruiz 63' | Report |

"Coyella" Fonseca, Guadalupe
Attendance: 200
Referee: Josué Ugalde
4 December 2022
(17:15 UTC-6)

| Puntarenas | 0–2 | Herediano |
|---|---|---|
| | Report | K. Vargas 42'; Escoe 71' |

Lito Pérez, Puntarenas
Attendance: 1,500
Referee: Ricardo Montero

Herediano won 3–0 on aggregate.

30 November 2022
(12:00 UTC-6)

| Grecia | 2–1 | Alajuelense |
|---|---|---|
| Lesme 47'; Agüero 89' | Report | Lesme 35' (o.g.) |

Allen Riggioni, Grecia
Attendance: 100
Referee: Keylor Herrera
4 December 2022
(17:00 UTC-6)

| Alajuelense | 5–0 | Grecia |
|---|---|---|
| Alfaro 40'; Suárez 45+5'; D. Rodríguez 56', 68'; Alcócer 83' | Report |

Alejandro Morera Soto, Alajuela
Attendance: 1,000
Referee: David Gómez

Alajuelense won 6–2 on aggregate.

Bracket B

29 November 2022
(20:15 UTC-6)

| Saprissa | 3–0 | Santos |
|---|---|---|
| East 27', 57'; Guzmán 68' | Report |

Ricardo Saprissa, San Juan
Attendance: 10,000
Referee: Carlos Salazar
3 December 2022
(20:00 UTC-6)

| Santos | 1–1 | Deportivo Saprissa |
|---|---|---|
| Ordain 64' | Report | East 56' |

Ebal Rodríguez, Guápiles
Attendance: 20
Referee: Raúl Eduarte

Saprissa won 4–1 on aggregate.

29 November 2022
(20:00 UTC-6)

| Sporting | 1–1 | Cartaginés |
|---|---|---|
| Martínez 36' | Report | Venegas 26' |

Ernesto Rohrmoser, Pavas
Attendance: 300
Referee: Adrián Chinchilla
3 December 2022
(18:00 UTC-6)

| Cartaginés | 2–1 | Sporting |
|---|---|---|
| Barrantes 60'; Guevara 88' | Report | Castillo 57' |

"Fello" Meza, Cartago
Attendance: 25
Referee: Róger Vindas

Cartaginés won 2–1 on aggregate.

== Semi-finals ==
=== Summary ===
Semi-final A

The first leg was played on 8 December, while the second leg was played on 11 December.

| Team 1 | Agg. | Team 2 | 1st leg | 2nd leg |
|---|---|---|---|---|
| Herediano | 2–1 | Alajuelense | 1–1 | 1–0 |

Semi-final B

The first leg was played on 7 December, while the second leg was played on 11 December.

| Team 1 | Agg. | Team 2 | 1st leg | 2nd leg |
|---|---|---|---|---|
| Saprissa | 1–4 | Cartaginés | 0–2 | 1–2 |

=== Matches ===
Semi-final A

8 December 2022
(20:00 UTC-6)

| Herediano | 1–1 | Alajuelense |
|---|---|---|
| Vargas 53' | Report | Góndola 21' |

"Coyella" Fonseca, Guadalupe
Attendance: 3,000
Referee: Keylor Herrera
11 December 2022
(16:00 UTC-6)

| Alajuelense | 0–1 | Herediano |
|---|---|---|
| | Report | Contreras 50' |

Alejandro Morera Soto, Alajuela
Attendance: 5,000
Referee: Ricardo Montero

Herediano won 2–1 on aggregate.

Semi-final B

7 December 2022
(20:00 UTC-6)

| Saprissa | 0–2 | Cartaginés |
|---|---|---|
| | Report | Espinoza 76'; J. Quirós 89' |

Ricardo Saprissa, San Juan
Attendance: 10,000
Referee: Juan Gabriel Calderón
11 December 2022
(11:00 UTC-6)

| Cartaginés | 2–1 | Saprissa |
|---|---|---|
| Cerdas 4'; Bonilla 57' | Report | Rodríguez 52' |

"Fello" Meza, Cartago
Attendance: 5,000
Referee: Benjamín Pineda

Cartaginés won 4–1 on aggregate.

== Finals ==
=== Summary ===
The first leg was played on 15 December, while the second leg was played on 21 December.

| Team 1 | Agg. | Team 2 | 1st leg | 2nd leg |
|---|---|---|---|---|
| Herediano | 2–3 | Cartaginés | 2–1 | 0–2 |

=== Matches ===
15 December 2022
(19:00 UTC-6)

| Herediano | 2–1 | Cartaginés |
|---|---|---|
| Fuller 76'; Tejeda 90+1' | Report | Cerdas 57' |

"Coyella" Fonseca, Guadalupe
Attendance: 1,000
Referee: Keylor Herrera
21 December 2022
(20:00 UTC-6)

| Cartaginés | 2–0 | Herediano |
|---|---|---|
| Barrantes 3'; Araya 5' | Report |

"Fello" Meza, Cartago
Attendance: 6,000
Referee: Ricardo Montero

Cartaginés won 3–2 on aggregate.

== Top goalscorers ==
| Rank | Player | Club | Goals |
|---|---|---|---|
| 1 | (Jamaica) Javon East | Saprissa | 5 |
| 2 | (Costa Rica) Allen Guevara | Cartaginés | 3 |
| 2 | (Mexico) Brian Martínez | Sporting | 3 |
| 2 | (Paraguay) Fernando Lesme | Grecia | 3 |
| 2 | (Costa Rica) Doryan Rodríguez | Alajuelense | 3 |
