= 2015–16 Liga FPD =

Primera División
- Season: 2015–16
- Champions: Invierno: Saprissa; Verano: Herediano
- Champions League: Saprissa; Herediano
- Biggest home win: Belén Siglo XXI 5-1 Santos de Guápiles (9 September 2015)
- Biggest away win: Carmelita 0-3 Deportivo Saprissa (13 August 2015)
- Highest scoring: Uruguay 4-3 Pérez Zeledón (16 August 2015)
- Longest winning run: Alajelense (5)
- Longest unbeaten run: Alajelense (9)
- Longest winless run: Pérez Zeledón (7)
- Longest losing run: UCR (5)

The 2015–16 Costa Rican FPD was the 95th season of the Costa Rican top-flight football league. It was divided in two championships: the Invierno and Verano seasons.

The Invierno season will be dedicated to Manuel Antonio "Pilo" Obando.

== Teams ==
The league will be contested by a total of 12 teams, including Municipal Liberia, promoted from the 2014–15 Liga de Ascenso, meanwhile Puma Generaleña were relegated.

Locations of the 2014-15 Costa Rican FPD teams

=== Personnel, kits and Stadia ===
Note: Table lists in alphabetical order.

Team	Manager	Kit manufacturer	Shirt sponsor(s)	Stadium	Capacity
Alajuelense	(Costa Rica) Javier Delgado	Puma	Movistar, Ibérico	Alejandro Morera Soto	18,000
Belén	(Argentina) José Giacone	Living Sports	Bridgestone	Polideportivo de Belén	3,000
Carmelita	(Uruguay) Daniel Casas	Sportek	Great Wall	Alejandro Morera Soto	18,000
Cartaginés	(Uruguay) César Eduardo Méndez	Joma	Huawei, Bancrédito	"Fello" Meza	13,500
Herediano	(Costa Rica) Minor Díaz	Umbro	kölbi, Roshfrans, Peugeot, La 400, San Miguel	Eladio Rosabal Cordero	8,500
Limón	(Costa Rica) Horacio Esquivel	Sportek	APM Terminals	Juan Gobán	3,000
Municipal Liberia	(Costa Rica) Erick Rodríguez	Sportek		Estadio Edgardo Baltodano	6,000
Pérez Zeledón	(Costa Rica) Mauricio Wright	Canastico	kölbi, GAFESO	Municipal de Pérez Zeledón	6,000
Santos	(Costa Rica) Johnny Chaves	Living Sports	PickLounge	Ebal Rodríguez	3,000
Saprissa	(Costa Rica) Carlos Watson	Kappa	Bimbo, Ibérico	Ricardo Saprissa	23,000
UCR	(Portugal) Guilherme Farinha	Propia	—	Estadio Ecológico	1,800
Uruguay de Coronado	(Costa Rica) Rónald González	Lotto	CoopeAlianza	Municipal El Labrador	4,000

== Managerial changes ==
=== Before the season ===
Team	Outgoing manager	Manner of departure	Date of vacancy	Replaced by	Appointed	Position in table
Limón	(Costa Rica) Kenneth Barrantes	TBD	2015	(Costa Rica) Horacio Esquivel	2015	th (2015)
Pérez Zeledón	(Uruguay) Víctor Abelenda	Sacked	2015	(Colombia) Juan Eugenio Jiménez	2015	th ( 2015)
Santos	(Uruguay) César Eduardo Méndez	Sacked	2015	(Costa Rica) Jhonny Chaves	2015	th (2015)
UCR	(Argentina) José Giacone	Sacked	2015	(Colombia) Omar Royero	2015	th ( 2015)
Alajuelense	(Costa Rica) Oscar Ramírez	Sacked	2015	(Colombia) Hernán Torres Oliveros	2015	th ( 2015)

=== During the season ===
Team	Outgoing manager	Manner of departure	Date of vacancy	Replaced by	Appointed	Position in table
Cartaginés	(Uruguay) Claudio Ciccia	Sacked	August 17, 2015	(Uruguay) Cesar Mendez	18 August 2015	th (2014)
Municipal Liberia	(Uruguay) Orlando De León	Passed Away	22 August 2015	(Argentina) Gustavo Martínez	26 August 2015	th ( 2015)
UCR	(Colombia) Omar Royero	Sacked	August 24, 2015	(Portugal) Guilherme Farinha	August 25, 2015	th (2015)
Pérez Zeledón	(Colombia) Juan Eugenio Jiménez	Sacked	September 2015	(Brazil) Flavio da Silva	September, 2015	th (2015)
Deportivo Saprissa	(Costa Rica) Jeaustin Campos	Sacked	September 2015	(Costa Rica) Douglas Sequeira	September, 2015	th (2015)
Belen	(Costa Rica) Gerardo Ureña	Sacked	September, 2015	(Argentina) Juan Cruz	September, 2015	th (2015)
Municipal Liberia	(Argentina) Gustavo Martínez	Sacked	October 2015	(Costa Rica) Erick Rodríguez	October 2015	th (2015)
Deportivo Saprissa	(Costa Rica) Douglas Sequeira	Sacked	October 2015	(Costa Rica) Carlos Watson	October 2015	th (2015)
Belen	(Argentina) Juan Cruz	Resigned	October 2015	(Argentina) José Giacone	October 2015	th (2015)
Carmelita	(Costa Rica) Hugo Robles	Sacked	November 2015	(Costa Rica) Harold López	November 2015	th (2015)

== Campeonato de Invierno ==
The tournament began on 2015, with TBD defeating TBD 2–0, with Guatemalan player TBD scoring the first goal of the tournament. It ended on 2015, with TBD winning their st title after they overcome TBD in the final.

=== First stage ===
==== Standings ====
Pos	Team	Pld	W	D	L	GF	GA	GD	Pts	Qualification
1	Alajuelense	22	13	6	3	42	17	+25	45	Advances to the Semifinals
2	Herediano	22	13	4	5	31	15	+16	43	Advances to the Semifinals
3	Deportivo Saprissa	22	11	6	5	45	19	+26	39	Advances to the Semifinals
4	Limón	22	10	7	5	39	33	+6	37	Advances to the Semifinals
5	Cartaginés	22	10	6	6	31	32	−1	36	
6	Santos de Guápiles	22	9	7	6	32	32	0	34	
7	UCR	22	8	3	11	30	25	+5	27	
8	Uruguay	22	6	6	10	27	32	−5	24	
9	Belén Siglo XXI	22	5	6	11	27	40	−13	21	
10	Municipal Liberia	22	5	6	11	25	42	−17	21	
11	Carmelita	22	5	5	12	12	32	−20	20	
12	Pérez Zeledón	22	3	6	13	22	44	−22	15	

Updated to match(es) played on 21 September 2015. Source: Soccerway.com
Rules for classification: 1) points; 2) goal difference; 3) goals scored; 4) head-to-head points; 5) head-to-head goal difference; 6) head-to-head goals scored; 7) draw

=== Results ===
Home \ Away	ALA	BEL	CRM	CAR	HER	LIB	LIM	PEZ	SAN	SAP	UCR	URU
Alajuelense		0–0	3–0	3–0	2–3	1–1	1–1	1–0	2–0	1–0	1–3	3–0
Belén	1–5		0–0	1–2	0–1	1–1	2–2	0–1	5–1	0–2	3–2	1–1
Carmelita	0–2	2–1		1–2	1–0	1–0	1–2	1–1	0–1	0–3	1–0	1–0
Cartaginés	1–1	2–1	1–1		0–2	2–1	3–1	1–1	0–0	3–3	1–0	2–1
Herediano	0–0	1–2	2–0	2–0		3–0	2–0	1–0	2–2	0–0	0–2	3–1
Municipal Liberia	2–2	2–3	5–0	3–2	1–3		0–0	2–1	3–0	1–1	2–0	0–1
Limón	0–2	4–1	1–0	2–2	2–1	5–0		4–4	2–2	2–1	2–0	1–0
Pérez Zeledón	2–7	2–2	1–1	0–2	0–2	2–0	1–2		1–3	0–1	0–3	1–1
Santos	0–2	3–1	1–1	3–0	0–1	4–2	2–0	1–0		0–4	2–2	1–1
Saprissa	1–2	3–0	3–0	2–3	0–0	3–0	5–0	5–0	2–2		1–0	3–1
Universidad de Costa Rica	0–1	2–0	1–0	1–2	2–1	0–1	6–0	0–1	0–2	2–2		2–0
Uruguay	2–0	1–2	2–0	2–0	0–1	3–3	1–1	4–3	1–2	2–0	2–2	

Legend: Blue = home team win; Yellow = draw; Red = away team win.

=== Second stage ===
Semifinals
1	Alajuelense	0	3	3
4	Limón	0	0	0
2	Herediano	0	2	2
3	Saprissa	3	0	3

Finals
1	Alajuelense	0	1	1
2	Saprissa	2	2	4

==== Semifinals ====
First legs

14 December 2015

Limón	0–0	Alajuelense

Referee: Hugo Cruz

14 December 2015

Saprissa	3–0	Herediano
Colindres 8'; Angulo 32', 71'

Ricardo Saprissa, Tibás
Referee: Ricardo Montero

Second legs

17 December 2015

Alajuelense	3–0	Limón
Ortiz 23'; Rodríguez 47'; Guevara 70'

Alejandro Morera Soto, Alajuela
Referee: Randall Poveda

Alajuelense won 3–0 on aggregate.

18 December 2015

Herediano	2–0	Saprissa
Hansen 50' (pen.); Condenga 93'

Eladio Rosabal Cordero, Heredia
Referee: Henry Bejarano

Saprissa won 3–2 on aggregate.

==== Finals ====
First leg

21 December 2015

Saprissa	2–0	Alajuelense
Calvo 57', 68'

Ricardo Saprissa, Tibás
Referee: Hugo Cruz

Second leg

24 December 2015

Alajuelense	1–2	Saprissa
McDonald 65'		Imperiale 22'; Colindres 71'

Alejandro Morera Soto, Alajuela
Referee: Henry Bejarano

Saprissa won 4–1 on aggregate.

=== List of foreign players in the league ===
This is a list of foreign players in Invierno 2015. The following players:

1. have played at least one apertura game for the respective club.
2. have not been capped for the Costa Rica national football team on any level, independently from the birthplace

A new rule was introduced a few season ago, that clubs can only have three foreign players per club and can only add a new player if there is an injury or player/s is released.

Alajuelense

- (Honduras) Carlos Discua
- (Honduras) Jorge Claros
- (Panama) Harold Cummings
- (Argentina) Hernán Rivero

Belén

- (Mexico) Sebastián Fassi

Carmelita

- (Argentina) Lucas Monzon
- (Brazil) Jorge Barbosa
- (Brazil) Weller Pereira
- (Brazil) Carlos Souza

Cartaginés

- (Colombia) William Palacios
- (Uruguay) Fabrizio Ronchetti

Herediano

- (Mexico) Omar Hernandez
- (Mexico) Edgar Solis
- (Panama) Gabriel Enrique Gómez
- (Argentina) Jonathan Hansen

Limón

- (Colombia) Mauricio Rivas
- (Colombia) Manuel Lopera
- (Brazil) Serginho Barboza

(player released during the season)

Pérez Zeledón

- (Argentina) Tomas Fonseca
- (Brazil) Cleiton Januario Franko Kanu
- (Uruguay) Christian Yeladián

Municipal Liberia

- None

Saprissa

- (Argentina) Andres Imperiale
- (Panama) Adolfo Machado

Santos

- (Mexico) Eder Cruz
- (Mexico) Carlos Lopez

Universidad de Costa Rica

- (Argentina) Maximiliano Joel Silva

Uruguay

- (Argentina) Ismael Gomez
- (Argentina) Walter Silva
- (Uruguay) Washington Lencina

== Top goalscorers ==
Rank	Goalscorer	Team	Goals
1	(Costa Rica) Ariel Rodríguez	Saprissa	20
2	(Costa Rica) Erick Scott	Limón	18
3	(Costa Rica) Víctor Núñez	Guápiles	11
4	(Costa Rica) Alejandro Alpízar	Uruguay	10
5	(Costa Rica) Leonardo Adams	Belén Siglo	9
6	(Argentina) Walter Silva	Uruguay	9
7	(Costa Rica) Randall Brenes	Cartaginés	8
8	(Costa Rica) Jonathan McDonald	Alajuelense	8
9	(Honduras) Carlos Discua	Alajuelense	7
10	(Argentina) Jonathan Hansen	Herediano	7

== Campeonato de Verano ==
The tournament began in January 2016, with TBD defeating TBD 2–0, with TBD scoring the first goal of the tournament. It will end in June 2016, with TBD winning their st title after they overcome TBD in the final.

=== Personnel, kits and stadia ===
Note: Table lists in alphabetical order.

Team	Manager	Kit manufacturer	Shirt sponsor(s)	Stadium	Capacity
Alajuelense	(Costa Rica) Javier Delgado	Puma	Movistar, Ibérico	Alejandro Morera Soto	18,000
Belén	(Argentina) José Giacone	Livin Sports	Bridgestone	Polideportivo de Belén	3,000
Carmelita	(Uruguay) Daniel Casas	Sportek	Great Wall	Alejandro Morera Soto	18,000
Cartaginés	(Uruguay) Cesar Eduardo Mendez	Lotto	Huawei, Bancrédito	"Fello" Meza	8,300
Herediano	(Brazil) Odir Jacques	Umbro	kölbi, Roshfrans, Peugeot, La 400, San Miguel	Eladio Rosabal Cordero	8,500
Limón	(Costa Rica) Horacio Esquivel	Sportek	APM Terminals	Juan Gobán	3,000
Municipal Liberia	(Costa Rica) Erick Rodríguez	Sportek		Estadio Edgardo Baltodano	6,000
Pérez Zeledón	(Costa Rica) Mauricio Wright	Canastico	kölbi, GAFESO	Municipal de Pérez Zeledón	6,000
Santos	(Costa Rica) Jhonny Chaves	Livin Sports	PickLounge	Ebal Rodríguez	3,000
Saprissa	(Costa Rica) Carlos Watson	Kappa	Bimbo, Ibérico	Ricardo Saprissa	23,000
UCR	(Portugal) Guilherme Farinha	Propia	—	Estadio Ecológico	1,800
Uruguay de Coronado	(Argentina) Martín Cardetti	Lotto	CoopeAlianza	Municipal El Labrador	4,000

=== Managerial changes ===
==== During the season ====
Team	Outgoing manager	Manner of departure	Date of vacancy	Replaced by	Appointed	Position in table
Uruguay	(Argentina) Martin Cardetti	Sacked	2016	(Costa Rica) Ronald Gonzales	2016	th (2016)
Herediano	(Brazil) Odir Jacques	Resigned	2016	(Costa Rica) Mauricio Solis	2016	th ( 2015)
Herediano	(Costa Rica) Mauricio Solis	Caretaker ended	2016	(Costa Rica) Hernan Medford	2016	th (2016)
Carmelita	(Uruguay) Daniel Casas	Sacked	2016	(Costa Rica) Vincio Alvarado	2016	th (2016)

==== First stage ====
===== Standings =====
Pos	Team	Pld	W	D	L	GF	GA	GD	Pts	Qualification
1	Herediano	22	16	2	4	35	13	+22	50	Advances to the Semifinals
2	Saprissa	22	15	2	5	36	16	+20	47	Advances to the Semifinals
3	Alajuelense	22	13	3	6	47	22	+25	42	Advances to the Semifinals
4	Belén	22	11	6	5	27	14	+13	39	Advances to the Semifinals
5	Universidad de Costa Rica	22	9	5	8	29	29	0	32	
6	Cartaginés	22	9	4	9	25	26	−1	31	
7	Pérez Zeledón	22	9	2	11	28	30	−2	29	
8	Municipal Liberia	22	7	4	11	19	27	−8	25	
9	Carmelita	22	6	5	11	25	40	−15	23	
10	Limón	22	6	3	13	15	36	−21	21	
11	Santos	22	5	3	14	18	34	−16	18	
12	Uruguay	22	4	5	13	16	33	−17	17	

Updated to match(es) played on 9 May 2016. Source: Soccerway
Rules for classification: 1) points; 2) goal difference; 3) number of goals scored.

==== Results ====
Home \ Away	ALA	BEL	CRM	CAR	HER	LIB	LIM	PEZ	SAN	SAP	UCR	URU
Alajuelense		1–3	3–0	3–1	2–1	4–0	4–0	4–1	4–2	1–0	4–0	4–0
Belén	1–1		1–0	1–0	0–1	1–0	3–0	1–0	1–1	3–0	2–2	2–0
Carmelita	0–1	0–0		1–1	2–2	1–0	0–1	1–2	0–5	1–3	2–4	1–0
Cartaginés	3–3	1–0	2–3		1–0	1–0	1–0	2–1	3–0	1–4	2–1	2–2
Herediano	2–1	1–0	3–1	1–0		2–0	4–0	2–0	2–0	2–0	2–1	2–0
Municipal Liberia	1–2	0–0	1–1	2–1	1–0		1–0	3–2	3–0	1–1	1–2	0–2
Limón	1–0	2–1	1–4	1–0	0–1	0–1		1–0	2–4	1–2	1–1	3–1
Pérez Zeledón	2–2	0–1	1–2	0–2	2–2	1–0	2–0		3–0	2–1	2–0	4–0
Santos	0–2	0–2	0–1	0–0	0–2	1–0	0–1	3–1		0–3	0–0	1–0
Saprissa	1–3	2–1	4–0	2–0	1–0	0–0	2–1	0–1	1–0		3–0	3–0
Universidad de Costa Rica	2–1	1–1	3–2	1–0	1–2	4–0	3–1	0–1	1–0	1–2		0–0
Uruguay	1–0	1–2	2–2	0–1	0–1	1–1	1–1	3–0	2–1	0–1	0–1	

Legend: Blue = home team win; Yellow = draw; Red = away team win.

=== Second stage ===
Semifinals
1	Herediano	1	1	2
4	Belén	1	1	2
2	Saprissa	0	1	1
3	Alajuelense	2	3	5

Finals
1	Herediano	1	2	3
3	Alajuelense	0	0	0

==== Semifinals ====
First legs

30 April 2016

Alajuelense	2–0	Saprissa
Ortiz 45'; Rojas 88'

Alejandro Morera Soto, Alajuela
Referee: Randall Poveda

1 May 2016

Belén	1–1	Herediano
Torres 7'		Salazar 40'

Estadio Eladio Rosabal Cordero, Heredia
Referee: Jeffery Solis

Second legs

4 May 2016

Herediano	1–1	Belén
Núñez 66'		López 54'

Estadio Eladio Rosabal Cordero, Heredia
Referee: Allen Quirós

2-2 on aggregate. Herediano progressed as the higher seed.

4 May 2016

Saprissa	1–3	Alajuelense
Flores 84'		Ortiz 20', 51'; Diego Madrigal 97' (pen.)

Estadio Ricardo Saprissa Aymá, San Juan de Tibás
Referee: Ricardo Montero

Alajuelense won 5–1 on aggregate.

==== Finals ====
First leg

9 May 2016

Alajuelense	0–1	Herediano
		Granados 93'

Estadio Alejandro Morera Soto, Alajuela
Referee: Walter Quesada

Second leg

14 May 2016

Herediano	2–0	Alajuelense
Cubero 11'; Ruiz 52'

Estadio Eladio Rosabal Cordero, Heredia
Referee: Ricardo Montero

Herediano won 3–0 on aggregate.

=== List of foreign players in the league ===
This is a list of foreign players in Verano 2016. The following players:

1. have played at least one apertura game for the respective club.
2. have not been capped for the Costa Rica national football team on any level, independently from the birthplace

A new rule was introduced a few season ago, that clubs can only have three foreign players per club and can only add a new player if there is an injury or player/s is released.

Alajuelense

- (Honduras) Carlos Discua
- (Honduras) Jorge Claros
- (Panama) Harold Cummings
- (Argentina) Hernán Rivero

Belén

- (Mexico) Sebastián Fassi

Carmelita

- (Uruguay) Christian Yeladián
- (Brazil) Weller Pereira

Cartaginés

- (Uruguay) Fabrizio Ronchetti

Herediano

- (Argentina) Walter Silva
- (Mexico) Omar Hernandez
- (Panama) Gabriel Enrique Gómez
- (Argentina) Jonathan Hansen

Limón

- (Venezuela) Leonardo Javier Terán
- (Panama) Brunet Hay

(player released during the season)

Pérez Zeledón

- (Colombia) Tirso Guío
- (Colombia) Cristian Rivas
- (Brazil) Cleiton Januario Franko Kanu
- (Brazil) Pedrinho

Municipal Liberia

- (Nicaragua) Justo Llorente
- (Mexico) Jonathan De León

Saprissa

- (Panama) Adolfo Machado
- (Panama) Jaime Penedo
- (Trinidad and Tobago) Aubrey David

Santos

- (Mexico) Eder Cruz
- (Mexico) Marco Jovanni Rojas
- (Nicaragua) Marlon López

Universidad de Costa Rica

- (Argentina) Maximiliano Joel Silva

Uruguay

- (Argentina) Ismael Gomez

== Aggregate table ==
The following table combined the two seasons together.

Pos	Team	Pld	W	D	L	GF	GA	GD	Pts	Qualification or relegation
1	Herediano	44	29	6	9	66	28	+38	93	Qualification to the 2016–17 CONCACAF Champions League
2	Alajuelense	44	26	9	9	47	22	+25	87	
3	Saprissa	44	26	8	10	81	35	+46	86	Qualification to the 2016–17 CONCACAF Champions League
4	Cartaginés	44	19	10	15	56	58	−2	67	
5	Belén	44	16	12	16	54	54	0	60	
6	Universidad de Costa Rica	44	17	8	19	59	54	+5	59	
7	Limón	44	16	10	18	54	69	−15	58	
8	Santos	44	14	10	20	50	66	−16	52	
9	Municipal Liberia	44	12	10	22	44	69	−25	46	
10	Pérez Zeledón	44	12	8	24	50	54	−4	44	
11	Carmelita	44	11	10	23	37	72	−35	43	
12	Uruguay (R)	44	10	11	23	43	77	−34	41	Relegation to the 2016–17 Segunda División

Updated to match(es) played on 9 May 2016. Source: Soccerway
Rules for classification: 1) points; 2) goal difference; 3) number of goals scored.
(R) Relegated
