= 2015 Costa Rican Cup =

Costa Rican Cup
Torneo de Copa Banco Popular
- Official tournament banner

Tournament details
- Country: Costa Rica
- Teams: 20

Final positions
- Champions: Cartaginés
- Runners-up: Herediano

Tournament statistics
- Matches played: 26
- Goals scored: 83 (3.19 per match)
- Top goal scorer(s): Jonathan Hansen (5 goals)

The 2015 Costa Rican Cup (known as Torneo de Copa Banco Popular for sponsorship reasons) is the 3rd staging of the Costa Rican Cup. The competition began on July 4 and finished on November 19 with the final at the Estadio Nacional. The cup featured 20 teams, composed of all 12 teams of the FPD and 8 from the Liga de Ascenso. Originally, teams from the Liga Nacional de Fútbol Aficionado were expected to participate as well, but were withdrawn due to lack of budget.

The format of the tournament marked several differences to that of its predecessor, such as the lack of a group stage (similar to the 2013 edition), and the addition of a "best loser" rule, in which a team could still qualify to a further round, despite having lost a match.

The tournament saw the defending champions Cartaginés earning a second title by defeating Herediano in the final.

== Qualified teams ==
The following teams were announced to participate in the 2015 Costa Rican Cup:

12 teams from the 2015–16 FPD:

- Alajuelense
- Belén
- Carmelita
- Cartaginés
- Herediano
- Municipal Liberia
- Limón
- Pérez Zeledón
- Santos de Guápiles
- Saprissa
- Universidad de Costa Rica
- Uruguay de Coronado

8 teams from the 2014–15 Liga de Ascenso:

- AS Puma Generaleña
- Aserrí
- Barrio México
- Cariari
- Escazuceña
- Guanacasteca
- Osa
- Turrialba

== Bracket ==
First round
9 July
Guanacasteca	1
Saprissa	2
5 July
Pérez Zeledón	4
AS Puma Generaleña	2
5 July
Municipal Liberia	2 (2)
Cartaginés (p)	2 (4)
5 July
Aserrí	0
Uruguay de Coronado	6
5 July
Turrialba	2 (3)
Alajuelense (p)	2 (4)
5 July
Limón	1
Santos de Guápiles	2
4 July
Osa	0
Herediano	3
5 July
UCR (p)	0 (6)
Escazuceña	0 (5)
5 July
Belén (p)	0 (4)
Barrio México	0 (1)
5 July
Cariari (p)	0 (5)
Carmelita	0 (4)

Second round
12 July
Saprissa	0 (5)
Pérez Zeledón	0 (6)
12 July
Cartaginés	4
Uruguay de Coronado	1
Best ranked loser (second round)
Alajuelense
10 July
Alajuelense	2 (1)
Santos de Guápiles (p)	2 (3)
16 July
Herediano	2
UCR	1
12 July
Belén	3
Cariari	0

Third round
Best ranked loser (third round)
Cartaginés
19 and 26 July
Pérez Zeledón	5	1	6
Cartaginés	4	1	5
21 and 30 July
Alajuelense	2	2	4
Santos de Guápiles	0	1	1
22 and 26 July
Herediano	3	2	5
Belén	2	0	2

Semi-finals
2 and 30 September
Cartaginés	1	4	5
Pérez Zeledón	0	1	1
2 and 30 September
Alajuelense	1	2	3
Herediano	2	3	5

Final
19 November
Cartaginés (p)	1 (3)
Herediano	1 (1)

== First round ==
The draw for the first round was held on 26 June 2015.

=== Matches ===
4 July	Osa	0–3	Herediano	Ciudad Cortés, Osa
14:00			Hansen 60' (pen.); Cunningham 83'; Arias 88'	Stadium: Estadio Municipal; Referee: Juan G. Calderón

5 July	Pérez Zeledón	4–2	AS Puma	San Isidro, Pérez Zeledón
11:00	Davis 20', 43'; Yeladian 56'; Valderramos 90+'		Calvo 47'; Robles 61'	Stadium: Estadio Municipal; Referee: Adrián Elizondo

5 July	Liberia	2–2 (2–4 p)	Cartaginés	Liberia, Liberia
11:00	Chévez 10', 20'		Aguilar 65'; Brenes 74'	Stadium: Edgardo Baltodano; Referee: Keylor Herrera
	Penalties
	Chévez (penalty missed); García (penalty scored); Flores (penalty scored); J. Jiménez (penalty missed)		(penalty scored) Brenes; (penalty scored) Scott; (penalty scored) P. Jiménez; (penalty scored) Guzmán

5 July	UCR	0–0 (6–5 p)	Escazuceña	Guadalupe, Goicoechea
11:00				Stadium: "Coyella" Fonseca; Referee: Jimmy Torres

5 July	Turrialba	2–2 (3–4 p)	Alajuelense	Turrialba, Turrialba
13:00	Solano 4'; 84'		Calvo 2', 60'	Stadium: Rafael Ángel Camacho; Referee: Danny Lobo

5 July	Aserrí	0–6	Uruguay	Aserrí, Aserrí
14:00			Alpízar 45' (pen.) (o.g.); Gómez	Stadium: ST Center; Referee: Andrey Vega

5 July	Limón	1–2	Santos	Limón
14:00	Hudson 10'		Monguío; Zapata	Stadium: Juan Gobán; Referee: Adrián Chinchilla

5 July	Cariari	0–0 (5–4 p)	Carmelita	Cariari, Pococí
15:00				Stadium: Estadio Comunal; Referee: Andrés Alpízar

5 July	Barrio México	0–0 (1–4 p)	Belén	Guadalupe, Goicoechea
15:00				Stadium: "Coyella" Fonseca; Referee: Isaac Mendoza

8 July	Guanacasteca	1–2	Saprissa	Liberia
20:00	Meis 33'		Segura 47'; Soto 74'	Stadium: Edgardo Baltodano; Referee: Pedro Navarro

== Second round ==
The draw for the second round was held on 6 July 2015.

=== Matches ===
9 July	Alajuelense	2–2 (1–3 p)	Santos	Alajuela
20:00	Alonso 51', 53'		Pérez 47'; Matarrita 75' (o.g.)	Stadium: Alejandro Morera Soto; Referee: Allen Quirós
	Penalties
	Acosta (penalty missed); Matarrita (penalty scored); F. Rodríguez (penalty missed); Guevara (penalty missed)		(penalty scored) Quirós; (penalty missed) Camacho; (penalty scored) Zapata; (penalty scored) Pérez

12 July	Cartaginés	4–1	Uruguay	Cartago
11:00	Brenes 34', 77'; Sánchez 39'; Marrero 72'		Herrera 84'	Stadium: "Fello" Meza; Referee: Danny Lobo

12 July	Saprissa	0–0 (5–6 p)	Pérez Zeledón	Guadalupe, Goicoechea
13:15				Stadium: "Coyella" Fonseca; Referee: Adrián Chinchilla

12 July	Belén	3–0	Cariari	Heredia
14:00	Adams 52'; Rodríguez 55'; Solórzano 84'			Stadium: Eladio Rosabal Cordero

15 July	Herediano	2–1	UCR	Heredia
20:00	Hansen 71' (pen.); Cunningham 89'		Sibaja 30'	Stadium: Eladio Rosabal Cordero; Referee: Adrián Elizondo

== Third round ==
=== First leg ===
19 July	Pérez Zeledón	5–4	Cartaginés	San Isidro, Pérez Zeledón
12:00	Mitchell 1'; Yeladian 24'; Garro 75'; Montoya 77'; Porras 86'		Delgado 39'; Aguilar 47', 60'; Scott 50' (pen.)	Stadium: Estadio Municipal

20 July	Alajuelense	2–0	Santos	Alajuela
20:00	Calvo 38'; Alonso 57'			Stadium: Alejandro Morera Soto; Referee: Juan Gabriel Calderón

21 July	Herediano	3–2	Belén	Heredia
20:00	Azofeifa 65'; Hansen 70' (pen.); Scott 90+2'		Adams 31', 42'	Stadium: Eladio Rosabal Cordero; Referee: Andrey Vega

=== Second leg ===
26 July	Cartaginés	1–1 (5–6 agg.)	Pérez Zeledón	Cartago
14:30	Ronchetti 81'		Montoya 22'	Stadium: "Fello" Meza; Referee: Adrián Elizondo

29 July	Santos	1–2 (1–4 agg.)	Alajuelense	Guápiles, Pococí
20:00	J. Pérez 79'		Lezcano 15'; Alonso 86'	Stadium: Ebal Rodríguez; Referee: Jimmy Torres

25 July	Belén	0–2 (2–5 agg.)	Herediano	Heredia
11:00			Hay 14'; Núñez 50'	Stadium: Eladio Rosabal Cordero; Referee: Andrés Alpízar

== Semi-finals ==
=== First leg ===
2 September	Cartaginés	1–0	Pérez Zeledón	Cartago
20:00	Fonseca 37'			Stadium: "Fello" Meza; Referee: Adrián Chinchilla

2 September	Alajuelense	1–2	Herediano	Alajuela
20:00	McDonald 71'		Brown 12'; Hansen 18'	Stadium: Estadio Alejandro Morera Soto

=== Second leg ===
29 September	Pérez Zeledón	1–4	Cartaginés	San Isidro, Pérez Zeledón
20:00	Mitchell 20'		Castillo 9', 25'; Vega 15'; Brenes 81'	Stadium: Estadio Municipal

29 September	Herediano	3–2	Alajuelense	Heredia
20:00	Hansen 2' (pen.); Granados 76', 82'		Guevara 18'; Ortiz 23'	Stadium: Eladio Rosabal Cordero

== Final ==
19 November	Cartaginés	1–1 (3–1 p)	Herediano	San José
20:00	37' (pen.) Brenes		Aguilar 87'	Stadium: Estadio Nacional

Costa Rican Cup Champion
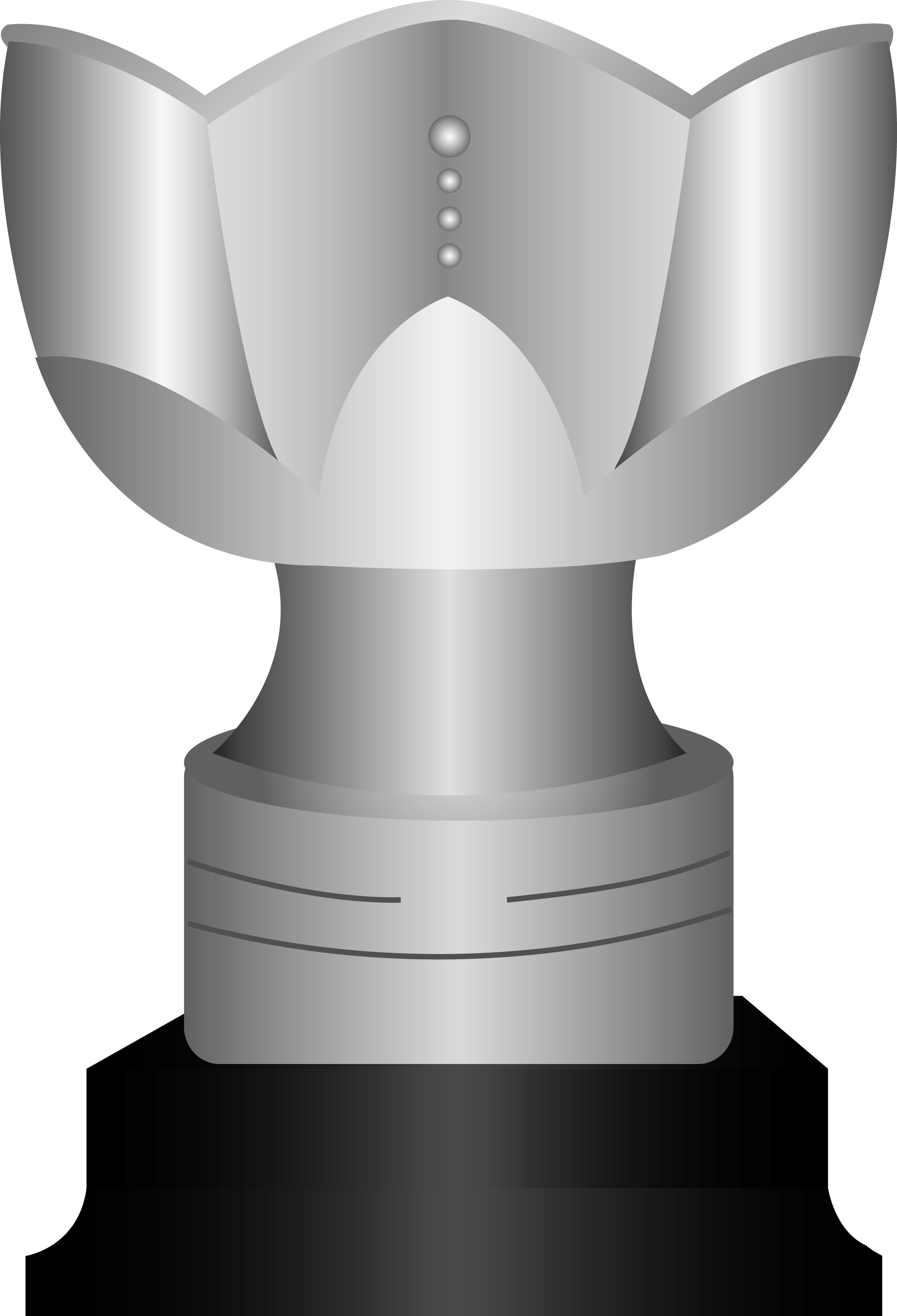

5th title
