= 2013–14 Costa Rican Primera División season =

Primera División
- Season: 2013–14
- Champions: 2013 Invierno: Alajuelense (29th title); 2014 Verano: Saprissa (30th title)
- Champions League: Alajuelense; Saprissa; Herediano
- Matches: 132
- Goals: 364 (2.76 per match)
- Top goalscorer: (Costa Rica) Cristian Lagos (13 goals)
- Biggest home win: Saprissa 5–1 Limón
- Biggest away win: Pérez Zeledón 0–4 Alajuelense
- Highest scoring: Saprissa 4–4 Alajuelense (22 September 2013)
- Longest unbeaten run: Saprissa (11 games)
- Highest attendance: 32,631; Alajuelense 3–0 Saprissa (10 November 2013)
- All statistics correct as of 24 November 2013.

The 2013–14 Primera División season (known as the Campeonato JPS 2013–14 for sponsorship reasons) is the 95th of Costa Rica's top-flight professional football league. The season was divided into two championships: the Invierno and the Verano. Universidad de Costa Rica is the newly promoted member.

The Invierno season was dedicated to Guillermo Vargas Roldán.

== Campeonato de Invierno ==
The tournament began on 11 August 2013 and will end on 22 December 2013.

=== First Stage ===
==== Standings ====
Pos	Team	Pld	W	D	L	GF	GA	GD	Pts	Qualification
1	Herediano	22	15	4	3	49	23	+26	49	Advances to the Semifinals
2	Alajuelense	22	15	2	5	38	18	+20	47	Advances to the Semifinals
3	Saprissa	22	12	6	4	38	25	+13	42	Advances to the Semifinals
4	Cartaginés	22	7	11	4	24	23	+1	32	Advances to the Semifinals
5	Santos	22	7	6	9	32	32	0	27	
6	Universidad de Costa Rica	22	6	9	7	25	26	−1	27	
7	Carmelita	22	6	8	8	29	33	−4	26	
8	Puntarenas	22	6	7	9	21	29	−8	25	
9	Pérez Zeledón	22	6	5	11	32	43	−11	23	
10	Uruguay	22	4	9	9	23	30	−7	21	
11	Limón	22	5	5	12	23	39	−16	20	
12	Belén	22	3	8	11	23	36	−13	17	

Updated to match(es) played on 24 November 2013. Source: Soccerway
Rules for classification: 1) points; 2) goal difference; 3) number of goals scored.

=== Results ===
Home \ Away	ALA	BEL	CRM	CAR	HER	LIM	PEZ	PUN	SAN	SAP	UCR	URU
Alajuelense		1–0	1–2	4–0	1–0	2–0	3–1	0–1	2–1	3–0	2–0	2–1
Belén	1–2		1–3	2–2	1–4	0–2	2–2	3–0	2–1	1–1	0–1	2–2
Carmelita	1–0	1–1		0–1	2–2	2–3	2–0	2–3	1–2	2–1	0–0	1–1
Cartaginés	0–1	2–0	1–1		1–1	2–0	2–1	1–1	2–2	0–0	0–0	2–2
Herediano	2–0	1–0	2–1	2–0		4–1	3–1	5–2	3–2	3–0	4–1	1–1
Limón	2–2	1–0	1–2	0–0	1–2		3–1	0–1	1–1	1–2	1–2	2–1
Pérez Zeledón	0–4	2–2	3–2	1–2	2–3	3–1		2–1	3–2	0–1	2–2	1–1
Puntarenas	2–1	3–1	1–1	0–1	1–2	0–0	0–0		1–0	0–0	1–1	1–2
Santos	0–1	2–2	4–0	2–1	3–2	2–0	2–1	1–1		1–2	1–1	0–3
Saprissa	4–4	2–0	3–1	1–1	1–0	5–1	4–2	2–1	2–0		3–1	4–1
Universidad de Costa Rica	0–1	1–1	0–0	1–2	1–1	4–1	1–2	3–0	1–3	0–0		2–1
Uruguay	0–1	0–1	2–2	1–1	0–2	1–1	0–2	1–0	0–0	2–0	0–2	

Updated to match(es) played on 24 November 2013. Source: Soccerway
Legend: Blue = home team win; Yellow = draw; Red = away team win.

== Second stage ==
Semifinals
1	Herediano	2	3	5
4	Cartaginés	0	0	0
2	Alajuelense	0	1	1
3	Saprissa	1	0	1

Finals
1	Herediano	0	0	0 (3)
2	Alajuelense	0	0	0 (5)

=== Semifinals ===
==== First legs ====
1 December 2013
11:00

Saprissa	1–0	Alajuelense
Vega 64'	Report	Guevara (red card) 55'

Estadio Ricardo Saprissa Aymá, Tibas
Attendance: 15,110
Referee: Hugo Cruz

1 December 2013
16:00

Cartaginés	0–2	Herediano
	Report	Arias 56' (pen.); Núñez 63'

Estadio José Rafael Fello Meza, Cartago
Attendance: 5,696
Referee: Henry Bejarano

==== Second legs ====
8 December 2013
16:00

Herediano	3–0	Cartaginés
Cubero 12'; Granados 19'; Leandrinho 54'	Report

Estadio Eladio Rosabal Cordero, Heredia
Attendance: 6,459
Referee: Jeffrey Solis

9 December 2013
18:00

Alajuelense	1–0	Saprissa
P. López 25'	Report

Estadio Alejandro Morera Soto, Alajuela
Attendance: 15,463
Referee: Walter Quesada

=== Finals ===
==== First leg ====
16 December 2013
20:00 (UTC-6)

Alajuelense	0–0	Herediano
	Report

Estadio Alejandro Morera Soto, Alajuela
Referee: Hugo Cruz

==== Second leg ====
22 December 2013
19:00 (UTC-6)

Herediano	0–0	Alajuelense
	Report
Penalties
Salazar (penalty scored); Soto (penalty missed); Olman Vargas (penalty scored); Leandrinho (penalty scored)	3–5	Guzmán (penalty scored); Aguirre (penalty scored); Sancho (penalty scored); Palacios (penalty scored); Oviedo (penalty scored)

Estadio Eladio Rosabal Cordero, Heredia
Referee: Walter Quesada

== Campeonato de Verano ==
The tournament began on 11 January 2014.

=== First Stage ===
==== Standings ====
Pos	Team	Pld	W	D	L	GF	GA	GD	Pts	Qualification
1	Saprissa (A)	22	13	7	2	43	18	+25	46	Advances to the Semifinals
2	Alajuelense (A)	22	12	6	4	40	21	+19	42	Advances to the Semifinals
3	Herediano (A)	22	12	5	5	41	23	+18	41	Advances to the Semifinals
4	Universidad de Costa Rica (A)	22	11	2	9	31	32	−1	35	Advances to the Semifinals
5	Carmelita	22	9	4	9	30	27	+3	31	
6	Belén	22	8	5	9	27	36	−9	29	
7	Uruguay	22	8	4	10	27	31	−4	28	
8	Limón	22	6	7	9	26	31	−5	25	
9	Cartaginés	22	5	9	8	21	29	−8	24	
10	Pérez Zeledón	22	5	8	9	28	36	−8	23	
11	Santos	22	4	7	11	23	37	−14	19	
12	Puntarenas	22	3	8	11	24	40	−16	17	

Updated to match(es) played on 23 April 2014. Source: Soccerway
Rules for classification: 1) points; 2) goal difference; 3) number of goals scored.
(A) Advance to a further round

=== Results ===
Home \ Away	ALA	BEL	CRM	CAR	HER	LIM	PEZ	PUN	SAN	SAP	UCR	URU
Alajuelense		1–0	1–0	1–1	5–2	3–0	1–1	3–0	3–1	0–0	5–2	3–0
Belén	1–3		2–1	2–2	1–4	3–2	1–1	2–0	1–1	1–2	1–2	2–2
Carmelita	1–2	0–2		1–1	2–0	4–2	3–1	2–0	1–0	2–2	2–1	2–1
Cartaginés	0–0	1–2	2–1		0–0	1–1	2–2	0–1	2–0	1–0	0–1	2–0
Herediano	1–0	0–1	3–1	3–0		2–0	0–0	3–1	4–2	2–2	5–0	2–1
Limón	4–2	3–0	3–2	1–3	0–2		1–0	0–0	0–0	1–1	1–1	3–0
Pérez Zeledón	2–2	2–2	1–2	2–2	1–3	2–0		4–2	3–1	0–1	2–1	1–1
Puntarenas	1–1	0–2	1–1	2–0	1–1	1–1	4–0		2–2	1–1	2–3	0–2
Santos	0–2	0–1	0–0	3–0	1–0	1–0	3–0	3–3		2–4	0–3	1–1
Saprissa	3–1	4–0	1–0	3–0	1–1	1–1	1–2	2–1	4–0		1–0	2–0
Universidad de Costa Rica	0–1	2–0	0–2	1–1	2–0	0–1	2–1	4–1	2–1	0–3		2–1
Uruguay	1–0	3–0	1–0	2–0	1–3	2–1	1–0	3–0	1–1	2–4	1–2	

Updated to match(es) played on 19 April 2014. Source: Soccerway
Legend: Blue = home team win; Yellow = draw; Red = away team win.

== Second stage ==
Semifinals
1	Saprissa	2	2	4
4	Universidad de Costa Rica	2	0	2
2	Alajuelense	1	3	4
3	Herediano	1	1	2

Finals
1	Saprissa	0	1	1
2	Alajuelense	0	0	0

=== Semifinals ===
==== First legs ====
TBD 2014

v

TBD 2014

v

==== Second legs ====
TBD 2014

v

TBD 2014

v

=== Finals ===
==== First leg ====
TBD 2014

–

==== Second leg ====
TBD 2014

–
