= Marco Ureña =

Costa Rican footballer (born 1990)

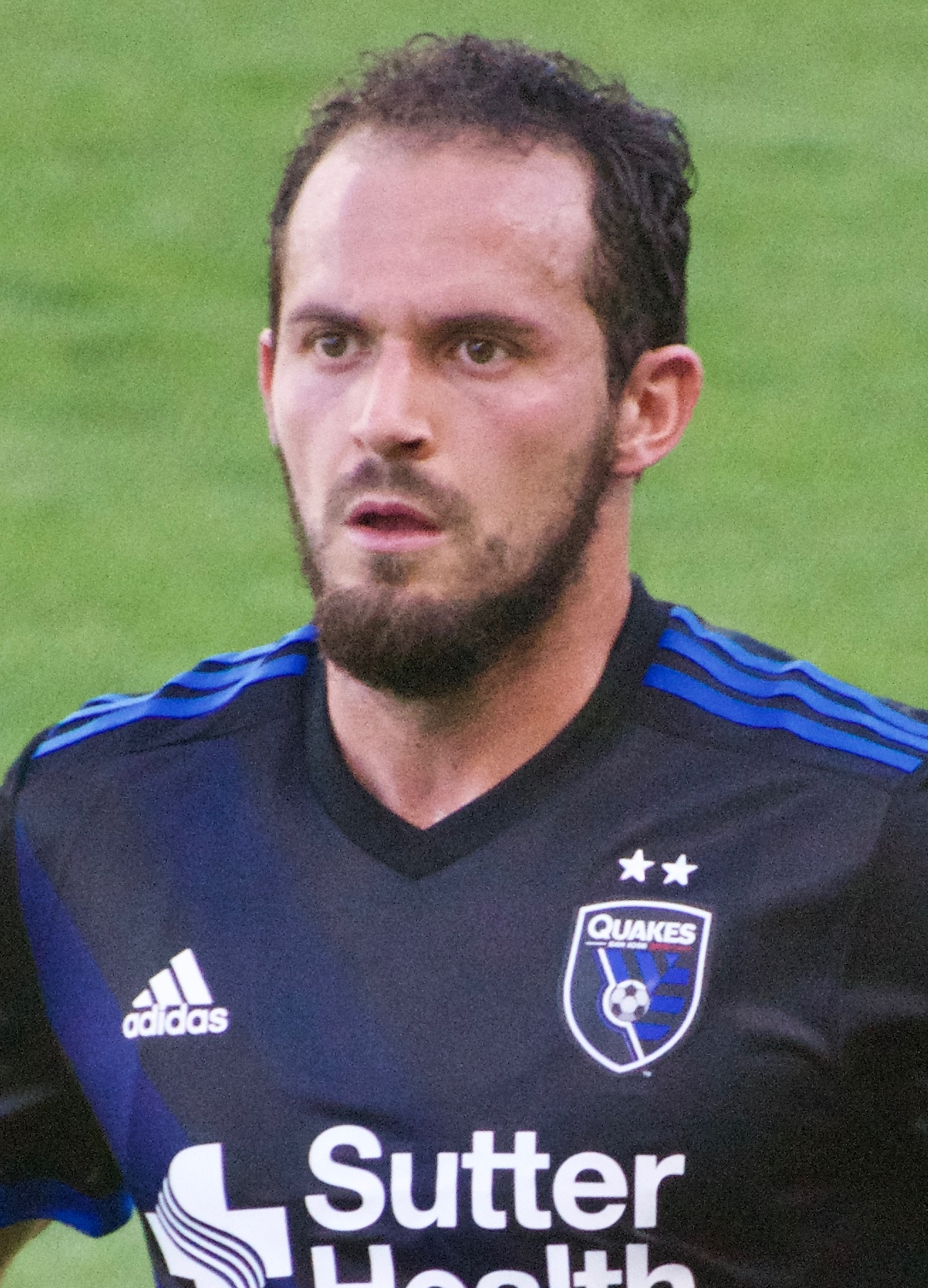
- Ureña with the San Jose Earthquakes in 2017

Personal information
- Full name: Marcos Danilo Ureña Porras
- Date of birth: 5 March 1990 (age 36)
- Place of birth: San José, Costa Rica
- Height: 1.76 m (5 ft 9 in)
- Position: Striker

Team information
- Current team: Sporting San José
- Number: 21

Senior career*
| Years | Team | Apps | (Gls) |
| 2008–2010 | Alajuelense | 59 | (10) |
| 2011–2014 | Kuban Krasnodar | 31 | (0) |
| 2014 | → FC Midtjylland (loan) | 10 | (2) |
| 2015–2016 | FC Midtjylland | 19 | (3) |
| 2016–2017 | Brøndby IF | 13 | (0) |
| 2017 | San Jose Earthquakes | 25 | (5) |
| 2018 | Los Angeles FC | 18 | (1) |
| 2019–2020 | Alajuelense | 40 | (12) |
| 2020 | Gwangju FC | 8 | (0) |
| 2020–2022 | Central Coast Mariners | 48 | (12) |
| 2022–2025 | Cartaginés | 103 | (18) |
| 2026– | Sporting San José | 2 | (0) |

International career^{‡}
| 2009 | Costa Rica U20 | 7 | (3) |
| 2009–2018 | Costa Rica | 67 | (15) |
- * Club domestic league appearances and goals as of 3 July 2024 ‡ National team caps and goals as of 1 February 2020

Marcos Danilo Ureña Porras, known as Marco Ureña (born 5 March 1990), is a Costa Rican professional footballer who plays as a striker for Sporting San José. He has also played for the Costa Rica national team.

== Club career ==
Born in San José, Costa Rica, Ureña started his career at Primera División side Alajuelense and in March 2011, he joined Russian Premier League side Kuban Krasnodar.

In August 2014, Ureña moved to Danish Superliga side FC Midtjylland on a four-month loan deal. The contract was made permanent on 10 December 2014.

On 21 July 2016, Midtjylland and Brøndby IF agreed to swap Ureña with Jonas Borring in a three-year deal.

It was announced on 27 January 2017 that Ureña had been signed by Major League Soccer side San Jose Earthquakes. He scored his first MLS goal in a 2–1 road loss to New York City FC at Yankee Stadium on 1 April 2017. Ureña recorded his first MLS assist at home to achieve a 1–1 draw against Seattle Sounders FC on 8 April 2017. His game-winning goal over Minnesota United FC on 22 October secured San Jose's sixth-place spot in the 2017 MLS Cup Playoffs, the team's first playoff appearance since 2012.

On 12 December 2017, MLS expansion side Los Angeles FC selected Ureña as its third pick in the 2017 MLS Expansion Draft.

Following his release by Los Angeles, Ureña was selected by Chicago Fire in the MLS Waiver Draft on 12 December 2018. However, he opted to join Alajuelense on 21 January 2019.

On 24 March 2020, Ureña joined Gwangju FC of the South Korean K League.

On 22 December 2020, Urena signed with the Central Coast Mariners in the Australian A-League.

== International career ==
Ureña participated in the 2009 FIFA U-20 World Cup for Costa Rica where Costa Rica U-20 national football team, placed 4th after losing to Hungary in the match for the 3rd place. He scored three goals on that competition.

In 2009, Ureña made his debut for the Costa Rica national football team in a match against Venezuela.

In June 2014, Ureña was named in Costa Rica's squad for the 2014 FIFA World Cup. In the team's opening match, he scored the third goal for Los Ticos in a 3–1 defeat of Uruguay.

At the 2017 CONCACAF Gold Cup, he scored the winner in Costa Rica's opening match and 0–1 victory against Honduras off of an assist from New York City FC man and fellow MLS player Rodney Wallace on 7 July 2017, at Red Bull Arena. This performance earned him CONCACAF Man of the Match honors.

On 1 September 2017, Ureña recorded a brace in Costa Rica's crucial World Cup qualifier against the United States, again at Red Bull Arena. On 5 September 2017, Ureña scored off of a volley to equalize the match against Mexico, which also served as his first goal at the Estadio Nacional de Costa Rica.

In May 2018 he was named in Costa Rica's 23 man squad for the 2018 FIFA World Cup in Russia. This would be Ureña's last call to play for Costa Rica. Upon his return to Costa Rican football in 2022, Ureña explained that his disappearance from the national team was due to internal conflicts he had with both players and personnel from the Costa Rican Football Federation. He cited Rónald González as the only coach that would call him up, but upon the arrival of Gustavo Matosas, Ureña knew he would not be called up anymore.

== Career statistics ==
=== Club ===
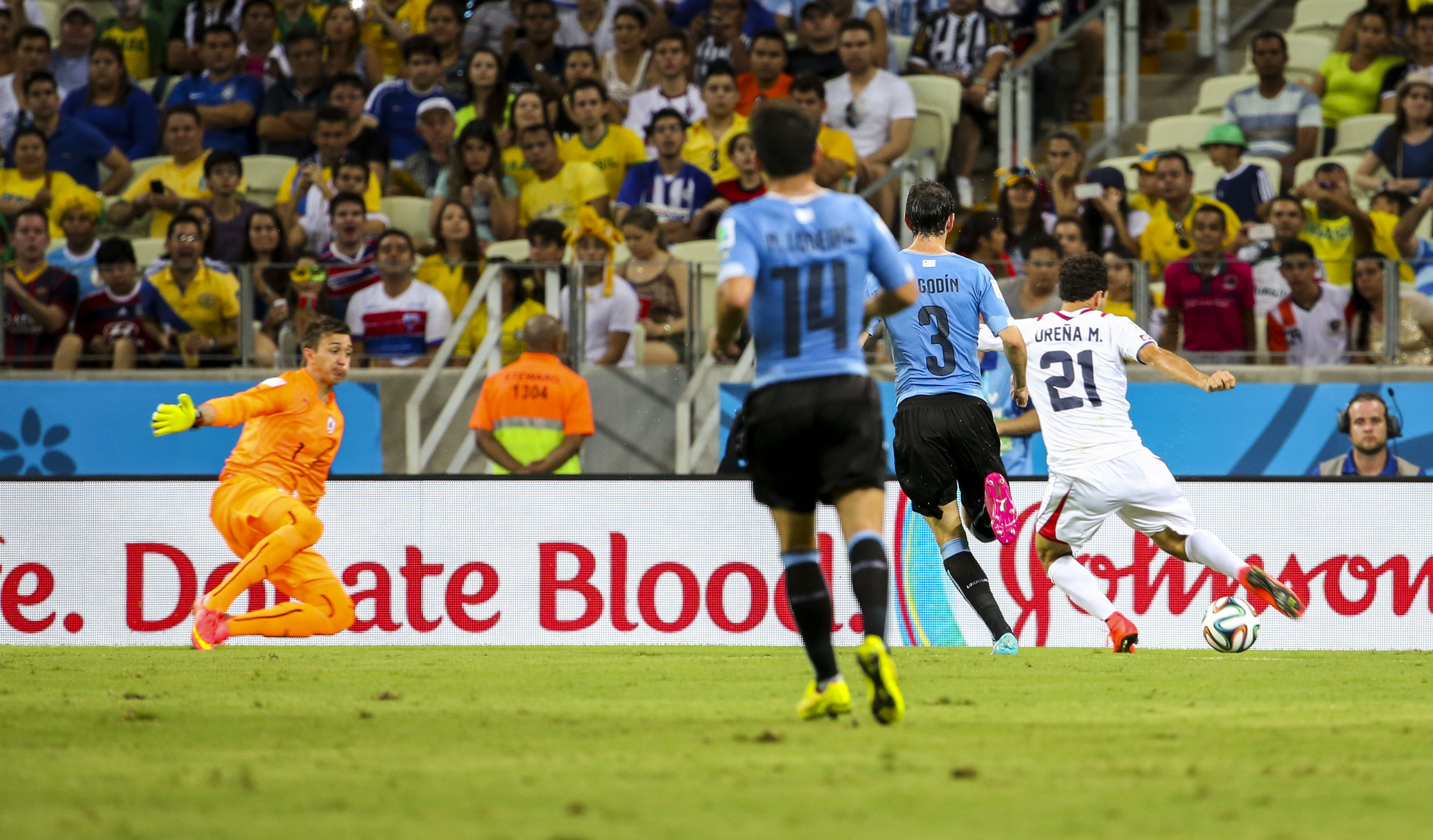
Ureña beats Fernando Muslera to score against Uruguay in the 2014 FIFA World Cup

As of 15 May 2022

| Club performance | | League | | | Cup | | Continental | | Total | |
| Season | Club | Division | Apps | Goals | Apps | Goals | Apps | Goals | Apps | Goals |
|---|---|---|---|---|---|---|---|---|---|---|
| 2011–12 | Kuban Krasnodar | Russian Premier League | 20 | 0 | 1 | 0 | — | | 21 | 0 |
| 2012–13 | Kuban Krasnodar | Russian Premier League | 6 | 0 | 1 | 0 | — | | 7 | 0 |
| 2013–14 | Kuban Krasnodar | Russian Premier League | 5 | 0 | 1 | 0 | 2 | 0 | 7 | 0 |
| 2014–15 | FC Midtjylland | Danish Superliga | 21 | 3 | 1 | 1 | 0 | 0 | 22 | 4 |
| 2015–16 | FC Midtjylland | Danish Superliga | 8 | 2 | 1 | 0 | 7 | 0 | 16 | 2 |
| 2016–17 | Brøndby IF | Danish Superliga | 0 | 0 | 0 | 0 | 0 | 0 | 0 | 0 |
| 2017 | San Jose Earthquakes | Major League Soccer | 25 | 5 | 0 | 0 | — | | 25 | 5 |
| 2018 | Los Angeles FC | Major League Soccer | 9 | 1 | 1 | 1 | — | | 10 | 2 |
| 2018–19 | Alajuelense | Liga FPD | 9 | 0 | — | | — | | 9 | 0 |
| 2019–20 | Alajuelense | Liga FPD | 31 | 12 | — | | — | | 31 | 12 |
| 2020 | Gwangju | K League 1 | 8 | 0 | 1 | 0 | — | | 9 | 0 |
| 2020–21 | Central Coast Mariners | A-League | 22 | 5 | — | | — | | 22 | 5 |
| 2021–22 | Central Coast Mariners | A-League Men | 26 | 7 | 4 | 1 | — | | 30 | 8 |
| Total | Russia | | 31 | 0 | 3 | 0 | 2 | 0 | 36 | 0 |
| Total | Denmark | | 29 | 5 | 2 | 1 | 7 | 0 | 38 | 6 |
| Total | United States | | 34 | 6 | 1 | 1 | — | | 35 | 7 |
| Total | Costa Rica | | 40 | 12 | — | | — | | 40 | 12 |
| Total | South Korea | | 8 | 0 | 1 | 0 | — | | 9 | 0 |
| Total | Australia | | 48 | 12 | 4 | 1 | — | | 52 | 13 |
| Career total | | | 190 | 35 | 11 | 3 | 9 | 0 | 210 | 38 |

=== International ===
As of 1 February 2020

Costa Rica
| Year | Apps | Goals |
|---|---|---|
| 2009 | 1 | 0 |
| 2010 | 5 | 0 |
| 2011 | 13 | 7 |
| 2012 | 0 | 0 |
| 2013 | 0 | 0 |
| 2014 | 11 | 2 |
| 2015 | 8 | 1 |
| 2016 | 7 | 0 |
| 2017 | 15 | 4 |
| 2018 | 6 | 1 |
| 2019 | 0 | 0 |
| 2020 | 1 | 0 |
| Total | 67 | 15 |

==== International goals ====
Scores and results list Costa Rica's goal tally first.

| No. | Date | Venue | Opponent | Score | Result | Competition |
|---|---|---|---|---|---|---|
| 1. | 16 January 2011 | Estadio Rommel Fernández, Panama City, Panama | Panama | 1–0 | 2–0 | 2011 Copa Centroamericana |
| 2. | 16 January 2011 | Estadio Rommel Fernández, Panama City, Panama | Panama | 2–0 | 2–0 | 2011 Copa Centroamericana |
| 3. | 23 January 2011 | Estadio Rommel Fernández, Panama City, Panama | Honduras | 1–2 | 1–2 | 2011 Copa Centroamericana |
| 4. | 9 February 2011 | Estadio Olímpico Luis Ramos, Barcelona, Venezuela | Venezuela | 2–1 | 2–2 | Friendly |
| 5. | 5 June 2011 | Cowboys Stadium, Arlington, United States | Cuba | 1–0 | 5–0 | 2011 CONCACAF Gold Cup |
| 6. | 5 June 2011 | Cowboys Stadium, Arlington, United States | Cuba | 3–0 | 5–0 | 2011 CONCACAF Gold Cup |
| 7. | 12 June 2011 | Soldier Field, Chicago, United States | Mexico | 1–4 | 1–4 | 2011 CONCACAF Gold Cup |
| 8. | 14 June 2014 | Castelão, Fortaleza, Brazil | Uruguay | 3–1 | 3–1 | 2014 FIFA World Cup |
| 9. | 3 September 2014 | Robert F. Kennedy Memorial Stadium, Washington, D.C., United States | Nicaragua | 2–0 | 3–0 | 2014 Copa Centroamericana |
| 10. | 17 November 2015 | Estadio Rommel Fernández, Panama City, Panama | Panama | 2–0 | 2–1 | 2018 FIFA World Cup qualification |
| 11. | 7 July 2017 | Red Bull Arena, Harrison, United States | Honduras | 1–0 | 1–0 | 2017 CONCACAF Gold Cup |
| 12. | 1 September 2017 | Red Bull Arena, Harrison, United States | United States | 1–0 | 2–0 | 2018 FIFA World Cup qualification |
| 13. | 1 September 2017 | Red Bull Arena, Harrison, United States | United States | 2–0 | 2–0 | 2018 FIFA World Cup qualification |
| 14. | 5 September 2017 | Estadio Nacional de Costa Rica, San José, Costa Rica | Mexico | 1–1 | 1–1 | 2018 FIFA World Cup qualification |
| 15. | 23 March 2018 | Hampden Park, Glasgow, Scotland | Scotland | 1–0 | 1–0 | Friendly |

== Personal life ==
Ureña married Ana Paula Aguilar in May 2014.

== Honours ==
Alajuelense

- Costa Rican Championship: Invierno 2010

Midtjylland

- Danish Superliga: 2014–15

Cartaginés

- Costa Rican Cup: 2022

Costa Rica U20

- CONCACAF U-20 Championship: 2009

Individual

- Copa Centroamericana Golden Boot: 2011
