= Randall Brenes =

Costa Rican footballer (born 1983)

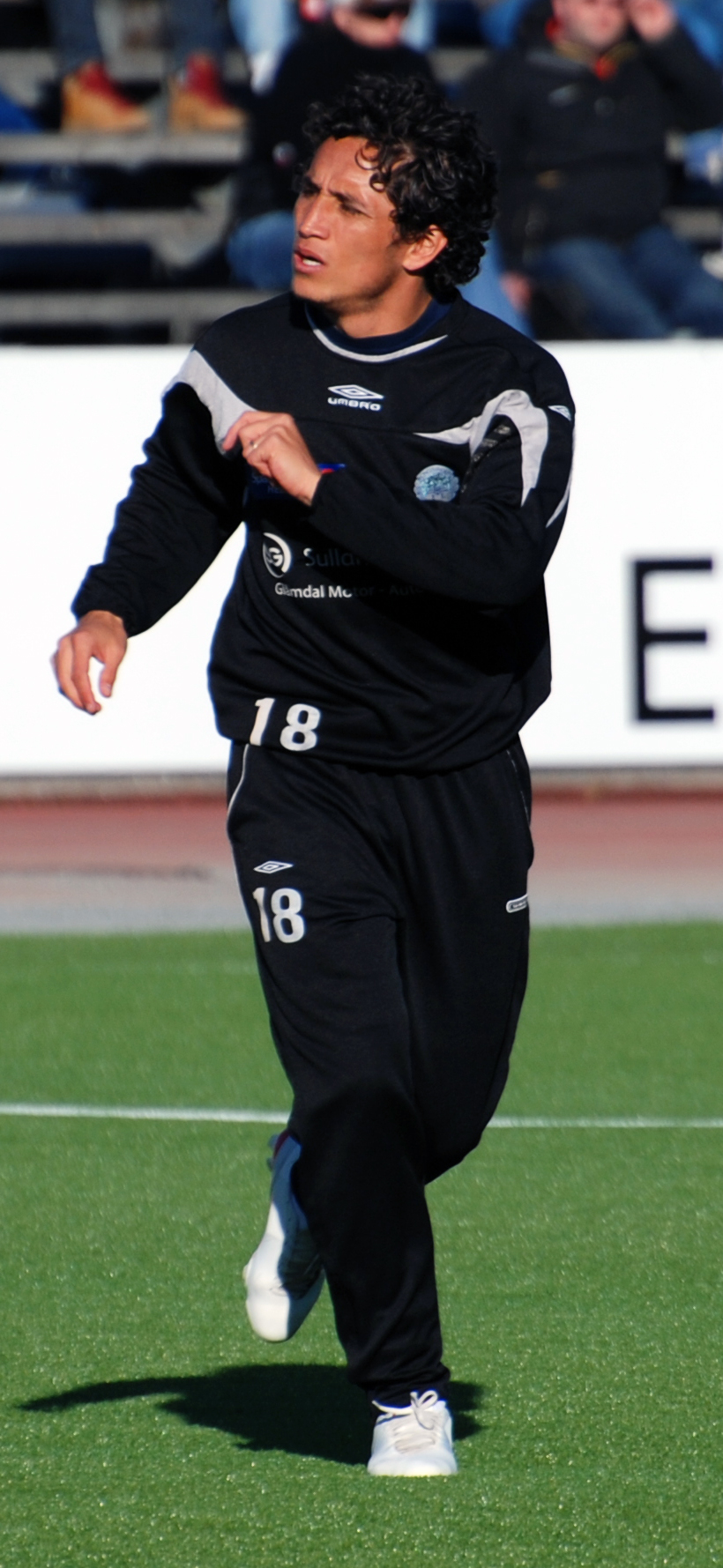
- Brenes with Kongsvinger in 2009

Personal information
- Full name: Randall Brenes Moya
- Date of birth: 13 August 1983 (age 43)
- Place of birth: Cartago, Costa Rica
- Height: 1.73 m (5 ft 8 in)
- Positions: Striker; second striker

Senior career*
Years	Team	Apps	(Gls)
2004–2005	Cartaginés	32	(16)
2005–2008	Bodø/Glimt	54	(15)
2008	→ Kongsvinger (loan)	14	(7)
2009	Kongsvinger	32	(8)
2010–2012	Cartaginés	66	(36)
2012	Khazar Lankaran	11	(1)
2012–2018	Cartaginés	182	(51)
2014	→ Sandnes Ulf	11	(4)

International career^{‡}
2005–2014	Costa Rica	43	(8)
- * Club domestic league appearances and goals as of 16 November 2014 ‡ National team caps and goals as of 30 June 2014

Randall Brenes Moya, in Norway known as «Ragnar Bremnes» (born 13 August 1983) is a Costa Rican former professional footballer, who played most of his career as a striker for Cartaginés, from which is currently the second historical goalscorer, with 103 league goals. He also played for the Costa Rica national football team

== Club career ==
=== Early career ===
Nicknamed El Chiqui (meaning Short or Small), due his height when he was at youth levels, he turned professional with Cartaginés before moving to the north of Norway. Making an impressive rookie season scoring 16 goals in only 32 games.

=== Bodø/Glimt ===
He joined Bodø/Glimt with his compatriot Roy Miller, who was also a teammate in Cartaginés, in 2005. At this point Bodø/Glimt was part of the Norwegian top division (Tippeligaen), but got relegated the same year. The team therefore played in Adeccoligaen in 2006 where Brenes was top scorer with 13 goals, 6 of them off headers. In 2007, the team gained promotion to Tippeligaen after winning at home and away against Odd Grenland from Tippeligaen. Bodø/Glimt had a big positive surprise the following season in Tippeligaen, ending on a fourth place.

=== Kongsvinger ===
Brenes was loaned at the middle of the season to Adeccoligaen team Kongsvinger to help them in the division, his compatriot Roy Miller, in the meantime, was sold to Rosenborg of Trondheim. In 2009, Brenes signed a full-time contract and helped Kongsvinger win promotion to Tippeligaen. But after the season ended, Brenes came to an agreement with the club to terminate his contract, because he wanted to move home to Costa Rica with his family.

=== Cartaginés ===
Randall Brenes back for the tournament in Summer 2010 and Winter tournament in the same year shared the scoring with Éver Alfaro and helping the team reach the semifinals. Brenes spent the 2010 and 2011 seasons with Cartaginés and winning two scoring titles, one in the tournament in 2010 winter and the other in the 2011 winter tournament and being the best player declared by the Primera División de Costa Rica in the winter 2011 and carrying to Cartaginés to fourth in the table, scoring in four minutes in the first half on the first semifinal but losing against the Herediano 3–1 on aggregate.

=== Khazar Lankaran ===
On 9 February 2012 Brenes signed a 2-year long contract with Khazar Lankaran. On 20 February 2012, made his debut in the season in a 2–1 defeat against Gabala and entering the 35th minute change by António Semedo and receiving a yellow card. On 7 March 2012, plays its first game start against Turan, playing 90 minutes. 14 March 2012, plays its first match in the quarterfinals of the Azerbaijan Cup in the 3–2 defeat against Baku Inter, scoring his first goal for the club and the second goal of the team at minute 57 and playing 90 minutes. On 28 March 2012, played 90 minutes in the second leg of the Azerbaijan Cup against Inter Baku scoring his second goal, a 1–1 draw at 76 minutes. On 11 May 2012, income also a starter in the 4–1 victory against Qarabağ, scoring the second goal at 22 minutes and out of change by Stevan Bates at minute 70. In the 2012–13 season, Brenes played four games for the club, all the Europe League. On 5 July 2012, playing 90 minutes against Nõmme Kalju and received a yellow card 53 minutes. On 10 July 2012, plays the second leg entering the 84th minute change by Sadio Tounkara. Then play in both games as a substitute, for the second round of Europa League against Lech Poznan. On 31 July 2012, Brenes signed his termination of contract due to breaches of the team with the player.

=== Cartaginés ===
On 7 August 2012, Brenes sign a 1-year long contract with Cartaginés.

=== Sandnes Ulf ===
On 4 August 2014, Brenes signed a loan deal with Sandnes Ulf.

== International career ==
He made his debut for the Ticos in 2005 as a substitute against Cuba at the CONCACAF Gold Cup Finals, immediately making an impact by scoring 2 goals. In January 2011, he returned to play in the selection of Ricardo La Volpe in Panama 2011 Copa Centroamericana, playing 5 games. On 26 March 2011, Randall Brenes played on the first game of the Estadio Nacional de Costa Rica against China and be in the history scoring the second goal of Costa Rica. In June 2011, played in two 2011 CONCACAF Gold Cup matches against Cuba and El Salvador scoring in stoppage time. In July, Brenes played two match against Colombia and Argentina in the 2011 Copa América.

=== 2014 FIFA World Cup ===
As of January 2014, he has earned a total of 36 caps, scoring 8 goals and has represented his country in 8 FIFA World Cup qualification matches.

On 20 June 2014, Brenes make his debut at the second round of group stage matches in the 2014 FIFA World Cup, entering replacing of Bryan Ruiz at 81 minutes, playing 9 minutes plus 4 minutes replenishment at the Itaipava Arena Pernambuco, taking a chance on goal but his shot went wide. In the third round of group stage matches, against England in the Estádio Mineirão, entry from the beginning and came out in the 59th minute by Christian Bolaños. On 29 June 2014, plays his third game in the cup against Greece at the Itaipava Arena Pernambuco for the round of 16, entering as a substitute in the 83rd minute, replacing of Christian Bolaños, playing all the extra time and make history with the Ticos, winning the game 5–3 on penalties shoot-out after the 1–1 on the 120th minutes and advance to the Quarter-finals.

=== International goals ===
As of 8 July 2018

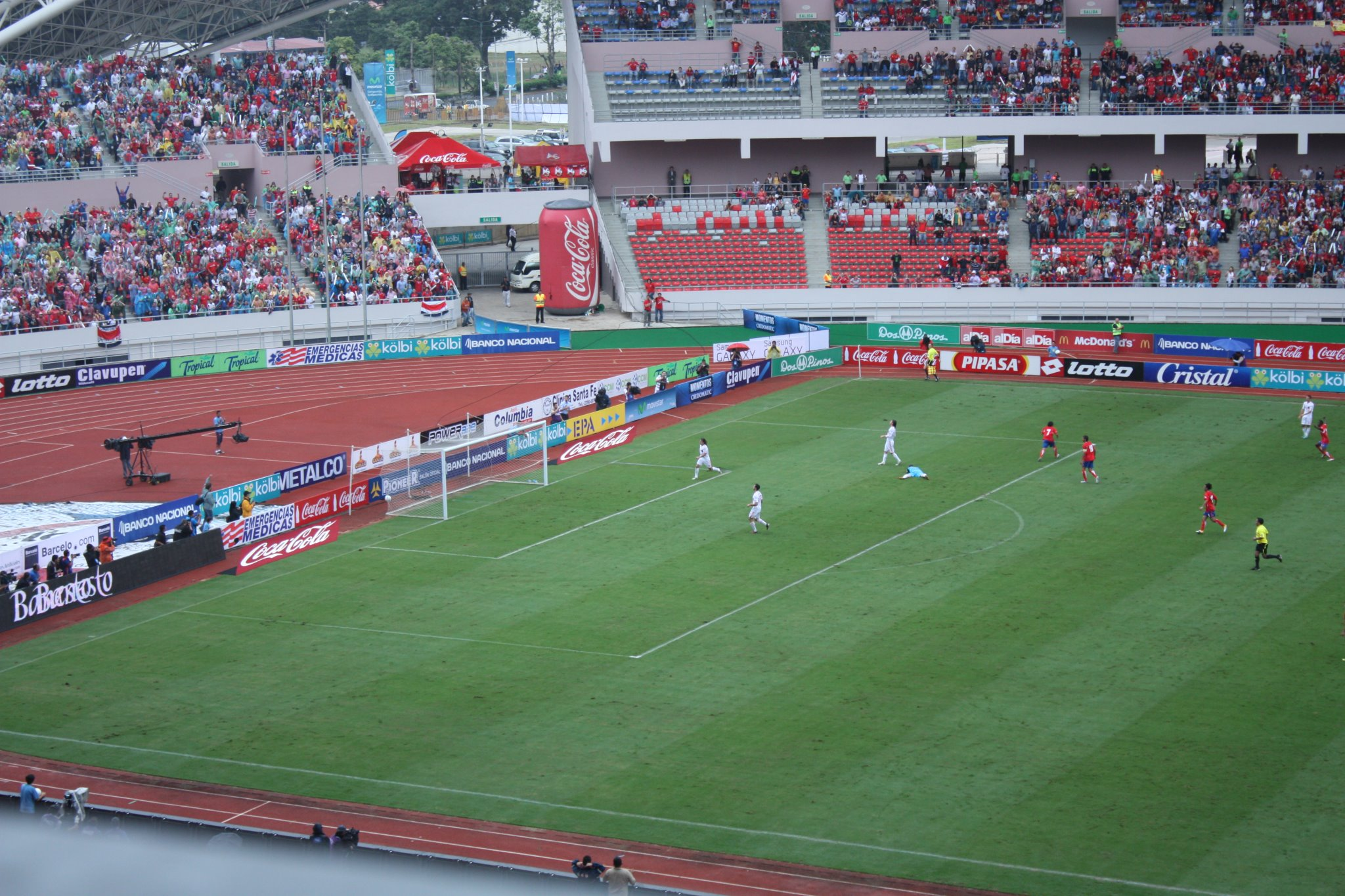
Brenes scoring against Spain

#	Date	Venue	Opponent	Score	Result	Competitions
1	July 8, 2005	Qwest Field, Seattle, United States	Cuba	1 – 0	3–1	2005 CONCACAF Gold Cup
2	July 8, 2005	Qwest Field, Seattle, United States	Cuba	2 – 1	3–1	2005 CONCACAF Gold Cup
3	26 March 2011	Estadio Nacional de Costa Rica, San José, Costa Rica	China	2 – 0	2–2	Friendly
4	9 June 2011	Bank of America Stadium, Charlotte, United States	El Salvador	1 – 1	1–1	2011 CONCACAF Gold Cup
5	15 November 2011	Estadio Nacional de Costa Rica, San José, Costa Rica	Spain	1 – 0	2–2	Friendly
6	16 October 2012	Estadio Nacional de Costa Rica, San José, Costa Rica	Guyana	1 – 0	7–0	2014 World Cup qualifier
7	16 October 2012	Estadio Nacional de Costa Rica, San José, Costa Rica	Guyana	3 – 0	7–0	2014 World Cup qualifier
8	10 September 2013	Independence Park, Kingston, Jamaica	Jamaica	1 – 0	1–1	2014 World Cup qualifier

== Career statistics ==
As of 8 July 2018

Club performance			League		Cup		Continental		Total	
Season	Club	League	Apps	Goals	Apps	Goals	Apps	Goals	Apps	Goals
Costa Rica			League		Cup		North America		Total	
2004–05	Cartaginés	Primera División	32	16	-		-		32	16
Norway			League		Norwegian Cup		Europe		Total	
2005	Bodø/Glimt	Tippeligaen	7	0			-		7	0
2006	Bodø/Glimt	Adeccoligaen	23	13			-		23	13
2007	Bodø/Glimt	Adeccoligaen	17	2	3	1	-		20	3
2008	Bodø/Glimt	Tippeligaen	7	0	2	0	-		9	0
2008	Kongsvinger (loan)	Adeccoligaen	14	7	0	0	-		14	7
2009	Kongsvinger	Adeccoligaen	29	8	3	1	-		32	8
Costa Rica			League		Cup		North America		Total	
2009–10	Cartaginés	Primera División	13	5	-		-		13	5
2010–11	Cartaginés	Primera División	32	17	-		-		32	17
2011–12	Cartaginés	Primera División	21	14	-		-		21	14
Azerbaijan			League		Azerbaijan Cup		Europe		Total	
2011–12	Khazar Lankaran	Premier League	11	2	2	2	-		13	4
Costa Rica			League		Cup		North America		Total	
2012–13	Cartaginés	Primera División	25	4	-		-		25	4
2013–14	Cartaginés	Primera División	35	4	-		4	0	39	4
Norway			League		Norwegian Cup		Europe		Total	
2014	Sandnes Ulf	Tippeligaen	11	4	0	0	-		11	4
Costa Rica			League		Cup		North America		Total	
2014–15	Cartaginés	Primera División	12	3	1	1	-		13	4
2015–16	Cartaginés	Primera División	38	15	7	5			45	20
2016–17	Cartaginés	Primera División	38	15					38	15
2017–18	Cartaginés	Primera División	34	10					34	10
Total	Costa Rica		280	103	8	6	4	0	292	109
Total	Norway		107	30	8	2	0	0	115	32
Total	Azerbaijan		11	2	2	2	0	0	13	4
Career total			398	135	18	10	4	0	424	145

== Honours ==
=== Club ===
Cartaginés

- Costa Rican Cup (2): 2014, 2015

=== International ===
Costa Rica

- UNCAF Nations Cup: 2013

=== Individual ===
- Player of the season at Cartaginés: 2010 and 2011
