= Mauricio Villalobos =

Costa Rican footballer (born 1999)

Personal information
- Full name: Mauricio de Jesús Villalobos Vega
- Date of birth: 20 August 1999 (age 27)
- Place of birth: San José, Costa Rica
- Height: 1.75 m (5 ft 9 in)
- Position: Midfielder

Team information
- Current team: C.S. Cartaginés

Youth career
- –2018: Deportivo Saprissa

College career
Years	Team	Apps	(Gls)
2018–2022	UCF Knights		

Senior career*
Years	Team	Apps	(Gls)
2023	SK Bischofshofen	1	(0)
2024	Uruguay de Coronado		
2024–2025	Santa Ana	42	(3)
2025	→ Deportivo Saprissa (loan)	8	
2026	Municipal Liberia	13	(1)
2026-	Cartaginés	2	(0)

International career^{‡}
2025–	Costa Rica	1	(0)
- * Club domestic league appearances and goals as of 3 October 2026 ‡ National team caps and goals as of 14 October 2025

Mauricio de Jesús Villalobos Vega (born 20 August 1999) is a Costa Rican professional footballer who plays as a midfielder for C.S. Cartaginés, and the Costa Rica national football team.

== Early life ==
He is the twin brother of the Costa Rica women's national football team player Gloriana Villalobos, they have an older brother Diego, and are the children of Carlos Villalobos and Flor Vega. They grew up in the El Socorro neighborhood of San Miguel de Santo Domingo, Heredia, Costa Rica.

== Club career ==
He joined the youth pathway at Deportivo Saprissa when he was nine years-old in 2009, and left in 2018 without making his debut although he did appear as an unused substitute for the first-team. He played for UFC Knights in college soccer in the United States, becoming team captain. He later played in Austria with SK Bischofshofen.

He then played for Uruguay de Coronado in Costa Rica and made his Liga FPD debut with Santa Ana in July 2024, where he featured in 42 out of 44 matches prior to rejoining Saprissa in June 2025 on a one-year loan.

He played again at Deportivo Saprissa but struggled for game time. In 2026, he joined Municipal Liberia and scored on his debut for the club against Liga Deportiva Alajuelense in January 2026. In July 2026, he signed for C.S. Cartaginés.

== International career ==
He played for the Costa Rica national football team in a friendly against Catalonia on 28 May 2025.

== Personal life ==
He studied for four years at the University of Central Florida where he graduated with a bachelor's degree in Sports Management and a master's degree in Advanced Education, with a focus on the administrative needs of an educational establishment. Whilst in Florida he had a close friendship with compatriot and teammate Gino Vivi.

== Career statistics ==
=== International ===
As of match played 14 October 2025

Appearances and goals by national team and year
National team	Year	Apps	Goals
Costa Rica	2025	1	0
Total		1	0
