= 2010–11 Costa Rican Primera División season =

Campeonato Nacional de Costa Rica 2010-2011
- Season: 2010–11
- Champions: Alajuelense (Winter 2010); Alajuelense (Summer 2011)
- Promoted: Belén Siglo XXI
- Relegated: Barrio México; Universidad de Costa Rica
- 2011–12 CONCACAF Champions League: Alajuelense & Herediano
- Matches played: 212
- Goals scored: 621 (2.93 per match)
- Top goalscorer: Ever Alfaro (Pérez Zeledón) & Randall Brenes (CSC) 10 goals (Winter 2010); Mínor Díaz (UCR) 12 goals (Summer 2011)
- Highest attendance: 14340 (LDA vs. CSH / Winter 2010) 15696 (LDA vs. ADSC / Summer 2011)
- Average attendance: 2050 (Winter 2010) 2125 (Summer 2011)

The 2010–11 Primera División season is the 92nd of Costa Rica's top-flight professional football league. The season is divided into two championships: the Invierno and the Verano.

== Promotion and relegation ==
Teams promoted from 2009 to 2010 Segunda División

- Barrio México
- Limón F.C.

Teams relegated to 2010–11 Segunda División

- Águilas Guanacastecas
- Ramonense

== Team information ==
Team	Manager	City	Stadium	Capacity
Alajuelense	(Costa Rica) Oscar "El Macho" Ramirez	Alajuela	Alejandro Morera Soto	17,895
Barrio México	(Costa Rica) Marvin Solano	San José	Estadio José Joaquín "Colleya" Fonseca	4,500
Brujas	(Costa Rica) Daniel Torres	Desamparados	"Cuty" Monge	6,000
Cartaginés	(Costa Rica) Jhonny Chavez	Cartago	Fello Meza	13,500
Herediano	(Uruguay) Orlando de León	Heredia	Rosabal Cordero	8,144
Limón F.C.	(Costa Rica) Ronald "El Macho" Mora	Limón	Estadio Nuevo de Limón/Estadio Juan Gobán	3,000/2,000
Pérez Zeledón	(Mexico) Rafael Bautista Arenas	San Isidro	Municipal	6,000
Puntarenas	(Uruguay) Jorge González Estévez	Puntarenas	"Lito" Pérez	4,105
San Carlos	(Uruguay) Daniel Casas	Ciudad Quesada	Carlos Álvarez	5,600
Santos	(Costa Rica) Ronald Gómez	Guápiles	Ebal Rodríguez	3,000
Saprissa	(Costa Rica) Roy Myers	Tibás	Ricardo Saprissa	24,000
Universidad de Costa Rica	(Costa Rica) Juan Diego Quesada	San Pedro	Ecologico	1,800

== Campeonato de Invierno ==
The 2010 Campeonato de Invierno, officially the 2010 Campeonato de Invierno Scotiabank for sponsorship reasons, is the first tournament of the season. The tournament began on July 24, 2010, and is scheduled to end in December.

=== First stage ===
==== Standings ====
Group A
Pos	Team	Pld	W	D	L	GF	GA	GD	Pts	Qualification
1	Barrio México	16	9	4	3	26	16	+10	31	Advances to the Quarterfinals
2	Cartaginés	16	6	5	5	22	20	+2	23	Advances to the Quarterfinals
3	Pérez Zeledón	16	6	3	7	18	22	−4	21	Advances to the Quarterfinals
4	Puntarenas	16	5	3	8	23	27	−4	18	
5	Limón	16	5	2	9	18	22	−4	17	
6	Saprissa	16	4	4	8	26	27	−1	16	

Group B
Pos	Team	Pld	W	D	L	GF	GA	GD	Pts	Qualification
1	Alajuelense	16	11	3	2	29	13	+16	36	Advances to the Quarterfinals
2	Herediano	16	8	5	3	33	18	+15	29	Advances to the Quarterfinals
3	San Carlos	16	7	4	5	19	18	+1	25	Advances to the Quarterfinals
4	Brujas	16	6	3	7	33	29	+4	21	Advances to the Quarterfinals
5	Santos	16	4	8	4	16	26	−10	20	Advances to the Quarterfinals
6	Universidad de Costa Rica	16	2	2	12	13	38	−25	8	

Updated to match(es) played on November 7, 2010. Source: Nación (in Spanish)
Rules for classification: 1) points; 2) goal difference; 3) number of goals scored.

==== Results ====
Home \ Away	ALA	BRM	BRU	CAR	HER	LIM	PEZ	PUN	SAC	SAN	SAP	UCR
Alajuelense		2–1	3–2	2–0	3–1	2–1			0–1	3–0		3–0
Barrio México				2–0	1–0	1–0	0–1	1–1	2–1	0–0	3–2	
Brujas	2–4	0–1		3–3	2–1	3–1			0–0	5–0		0–1
Cartaginés		0–0			0–0	2–1	1–0	3–1	0–0	7–1	1–1	
Herediano	2–2		1–1				3–2	2–0	4–1	1–1	3–1	4–1
Limón		3–2		2–1	1–2		0–0	4–1	2–0	0–1	0–0	
Pérez Zeledón	0–1	1–1	0–2	1–2		2–1		1–0			4–3	2–1
Puntarenas	0–2	2–5	5–2	2–0		2–0	1–2				1–1	3–0
San Carlos	3–1		4–1		0–3		1–0	2–1		2–3	1–0	2–0
Santos	0–0		0–2		2–2		1–1	1–1	0–0		2–0	2–0
Saprissa	0–0	2–3	3–2	1–2		3–1	4–1	1–2				4–1
Universidad de Costa Rica	0–1	1–3	2–6	3–0	0–4	0–1			1–1	2–2		

Updated to match(es) played on November 9, 2010. Source: Nación
Legend: Blue = home team win; Yellow = draw; Red = away team win.

=== Second stage ===
Quarterfinals
8	Santos	3	3	6
2	Barrio México	0	0	0
7	Pérez Zeledón	2	1	3
1	Alajuelense	2	4	6
4	San Carlos	2	0	2
3	Herediano	0	4	4
6	Brujas	2	1	3
5	Cartaginés	3	1	4

Semifinals
5	Cartaginés	1	0	1
1	Alajuelense	2	3	5
8	Santos	1	0	1
3	Herediano	0	1	1^{1}

Final
1	Alajuelense	0	1 (4)	1
3	Herediano	0	1 (3)	1

^{1}advances on regular season away goal differential

Campeonato de Invierno Scotiabank
2010 champion
Alajuelense

== Campeonato de Verano ==
The 2010 Campeonato de Verano began on January 8, 2011, and is scheduled to end in May. During the competition, Barrio México were expelled from the competition due to various financial difficulties. After this decision, all of Barrio México's matches were awarded 3–0 against them.

=== First stage ===
==== Standings ====
Group A
Pos	Team	Pld	W	D	L	GF	GA	GD	Pts	Qualification
1	Saprissa	16	10	3	3	31	14	+17	33	Advances to the Quarterfinals
2	Limón	16	8	5	3	31	18	+13	29	Advances to the Quarterfinals
3	Cartaginés	16	7	7	2	25	14	+11	28	Advances to the Quarterfinals
4	Pérez Zeledón	16	6	3	7	23	21	+2	21	Advances to the Quarterfinals
5	Puntarenas	16	3	2	11	16	27	−11	11	
6	Barrio México	16	2	2	12	11	37	−26	8	

Group B
Pos	Team	Pld	W	D	L	GF	GA	GD	Pts	Qualification
1	Alajuelense	16	9	4	3	26	20	+6	31	Advances to the Quarterfinals
2	San Carlos	16	9	3	4	23	16	+7	30	Advances to the Quarterfinals
3	Herediano	16	6	8	2	25	19	+6	26	Advances to the Quarterfinals
4	Santos	16	4	4	8	18	24	−6	16	Advances to the Quarterfinals
5	Brujas	16	4	4	8	22	31	−9	16	
6	Universidad de Costa Rica	16	4	3	9	18	28	−10	15	

Source: Nación (in Spanish)
Rules for classification: 1) points; 2) goal difference; 3) number of goals scored.

==== Results ====
Home \ Away	ALA	BRM	BRU	CAR	HER	LIM	PEZ	PUN	SAC	SAN	SAP	UCR
Alajuelense			4–1		1–1		1–0	3–2	0–0	3–2	2–1	2–2
Barrio México	3–2		0–2	1–3		0–3	1–2	1–0			0–3	2–4
Brujas	3–0				2–2		1–3	1–1	3–3	1–2	0–4	1–2
Cartaginés	1–1	3–0	1–1			4–1	2–2	2–0			1–2	1–0
Herediano	0–1	1–1	2–1	3–3		2–2			3–2	2–0		1–0
Limón	1–0	1–1	2–1	2–2			4–0	3–1			0–2	3–0
Pérez Zeledón		3–0		0–1	2–2	1–1		3–1	0–1	3–0	2–3	
Puntarenas		3–0		0–1	0–1	1–4	1–2		0–2	2–0	2–2	
San Carlos	1–2	2–1	3–0	1–0	2–1	2–0				1–0		1–0
Santos	1–2	2–0	1–2	0–0	1–1	1–1			1–1			4–1
Saprissa		3–0		0–0	0–2	0–3	1–0	2–0	3–0	3–0		
Universidad de Costa Rica	1–2		1–2		1–1		1–0	0–2	2–1	1–3	2–2	

Source: Nación
Legend: Blue = home team win; Yellow = draw; Red = away team win.

=== Second stage ===
Quarterfinals
A1	Saprissa	2	1	3
B4	Santos	1	1	2
B2	San Carlos	1	4	5
A3	Cartaginés	1	1	2
A2	Limón	0	2	2
B3	Herediano	2	2	4
B1	Alajuelense	1	1	2
A4	Pérez Zeledón	1	0	1

Semifinals
A1	Saprissa	2	0	2
B2	San Carlos	1	2	3
B3	Herediano	4	0	4
B1	Alajuelense	2	4	6

Final
B2	San Carlos	0	0	0
B1	Alajuelense	1	1	2

Campeonato de Verano Scotiabank
2011 champion
Alajuelense

== Aggregate table ==
Pos	Team	Pld	W	D	L	GF	GA	GD	Pts	Qualification or relegation
1	Alajuelense	32	20	7	5	55	33	+22	67	Qualified to the 2011–12 CONCACAF Champions League Group Stage
2	Herediano	32	14	13	5	58	37	+21	55	Qualified to the 2011–12 CONCACAF Champions League Preliminary Round (Note: Because Alajuelense won both season tournaments, Herediano qualify for 2011–12 CONCACAF Champions League as the better of the two seasons' runners-up.)
3	San Carlos	32	16	7	9	44	34	+10	55	
4	Cartaginés	32	13	12	7	47	34	+13	51	
5	Saprissa	32	14	7	11	57	41	+16	49	
6	Limón	32	13	7	12	49	40	+9	46	
7	Pérez Zeledón	32	12	6	14	40	43	−3	42	
8	Barrio México (R)	32	11	6	15	37	52	−15	39	Relegated to the Segunda División (Note: Barrio Mexico were relegated due to financial problems that caused them to be removed from the competition in mid-season.)
9	Brujas	32	10	7	15	55	60	−5	37	
10	Santos	32	8	12	12	34	50	−16	36	
11	Puntarenas	32	8	5	19	37	52	−15	29	
12	Universidad de Costa Rica (R)	32	6	5	21	31	66	−35	23	Relegated to the Segunda División

Source: Nación (in Spanish)
Rules for classification: 1) points; 2) goal difference; 3) number of goals scored.
(R) Relegated
