= Omar Royero =

Colombian footballer (born 1975)

Personal information
- Full name: Omar Royero Gutiérrez
- Date of birth: 23 July 1975 (age 51)
- Place of birth: Colombia
- Height: 1.85 m (6 ft 1 in)
- Position: Defender

Senior career*
Years	Team	Apps	(Gls)
1997	Atlético Junior		
1998	Deportivo Cali		
1999–2001	Deportivo Pasto	56	(2)
2003–2004	Pérez Zeledón	28	(3)
2005	Cobán Imperial		
2006	Liberia Mía	6	(0)
2006–2007	Santos de Guápiles	21	(0)
2007–2009	Carmelita	58	(3)
2009–2011	UCR	56	(2)

Managerial career
- 2012–2015: UCR (assistant)
- 2015: UCR
- 2015–2016: Belén (assistant)
- 2016: Alajuelense (assistant)
- 2016–2019: Pérez Zeledón (assistant)
- 2019–2020: Pérez Zeledón
- 2020: Pérez Zeledón (sporting director)
- 2021–2022: Sporting (assistant)
- 2023: San José
- 2023: CD Pavas
- 2024: CD Pavas
- 2024–2025: Pérez Zeledón (assistant)
- 2025: Pérez Zeledón (caretaker)
- * Club domestic league appearances and goals

Omar Royero Gutiérrez (born 23 July 1975) is a Colombian professional football coach and a former defender.

During his career, he also appeared with Atlético Junior, Deportivo Cali, Deportivo Pasto, Cobán Imperial, Liberia Mía, Santos de Guápiles, Carmelita, and UCR. Royero participated in the 1998 Copa Merconorte with runners-up Deportivo Cali.
