= Fernando Lesme =

Paraguayan footballer

Personal information
- Full name: Fernando José Lesme
- Date of birth: 8 April 2002 (age 24)
- Place of birth: Fernando de la Mora, Paraguay
- Height: 1.95 m (6 ft 5 in)
- Position: Center-forward

Team information
- Current team: Municipal Liberia (on loan from Celaya)
- Number: 33

Senior career*
Years	Team	Apps	(Gls)
2020–2021	General Caballero		
2021–2022	Potros del Este	22	(5)
2022	→ Grecia (loan)	33	(14)
2023–2024	Grecia	0	(0)
2023	→ Celaya (loan)	14	(5)
2024	→ Alajuelense (loan)	12	(3)
2024–	Celaya	14	(5)
2024–2025	→ Lugo (loan)	8	(0)
2025	→ General Caballero JLM (loan)	10	(1)
2025–	→ Municipal Liberia (loan)	10	(3)

International career^{‡}
2023–	Paraguay U23	2	(0)
- * Club domestic league appearances and goals as of 19 November 2024 ‡ National team caps and goals as of 22 September 2025

Fernando Lesme (born 8 April 2002) is a Paraguayan footballer who plays for Costa Rican club Municipal Liberia on loan from the Mexican side Celaya.

== Club career ==
Lesme was born in Fernando de la Mora, Paraguay. As a youth, he played for Club 29 de Setiembre, Club Olimpia, and General Caballero Sport Club. In 2021, he played for the General Caballero first team in the Primera C. Later in 2021, he moved abroad and made his top flight debut at age eighteen with Potros del Este of Panama's LPF. He made twenty-two appearances for the club, scoring five goals, during the Clausura 2021 and Apertura 2022.

In May 2022, Lesme then moved to Costa Rica to join Municipal Grecia, originally on loan then permanently, for a reported transfer fee of €225,000. In his first twelve league matches with the club, Lesme scored seven goals, tied for most in the league at that point. He went on to be the league's sole top scorer for the Apertura 2022. In June 2023, with one year left on his deal with Grecia, Lesme went on trial with Celaya F.C. of Mexico's Liga de Expansión MX. The player also reportedly received interest from C.S. Herediano and LD Alajuelense, both of Costa Rica's Liga FPD. Grecia also received an offer from a club in Denmark but the club declined.

Lesme was signed by the Mexican club on loan following the trial. He went on to score five goals in fourteen matches. In January 2024, he finally joined Alajuelense on loan ahead of the 2024 Clausura with the deal running through December 2024. In March 2024, Lesme started Alajuelense's 2024 CONCACAF Champions Cup Round of 16 match against Major League Soccer's New England Revolution. However, the player fell out of favor when Alexandre Guimarães took over as manager of the club. At the time, Red Star Belgrade, Hellas Verona, and Austin FC were reportedly among the clubs expressing interest in acquiring the frustrated Lesme.

On 30 August 2024, it was announced that Lugo of Spain's Primera Federación had acquired Lesme on loan until the end of the 2024–25 season with an option to buy.

== International career ==
In December 2023, Lesme was called up to the Paraguay national under-23 team for a series of friendlies against Ecuador and Panama.
