= Darril Araya =

Costa Rican association football player

Personal information
- Full name: Darril Araya Samuels
- Date of birth: 28 November 2000 (age 25)
- Position: Defender

Team information
- Current team: Herediano

Senior career*
Years	Team	Apps	(Gls)
2018–2021	Limon	44	(2)
2021–2023	Guadalupe	54	(2)
2023–	Herediano	98	(3)

International career^{‡}
2026-	Costa Rica	6	(0)
- * Club domestic league appearances and goals as of 23:25 (UTC) 19 September 2026 ‡ National team caps and goals as of 1 October 2026

Darril Araya Samuels (born 8 November 2000) is a Costa Rican footballer who plays as a defender for Herediano and the Costa Rica national team.

== Club career ==
Araya is from Estrada de Matina, Limón, and excelled at football from a young-age, necessitating his mother, who was also a footballer and played in the Women's First Division, to give her permission for him to play in above-age football from the age of six years-old. He started his professional career at Limon, making his professional league debut for the club, prior to moving to Guadalupe. He became a key player at left-back for Herediano, with the club manager Gustavo Pérez describing him as the best in the country at his position by 2026.

== International career ==
Araya made his debut for the Costa Rica national football team on 27 March 2026 in a friendly match against Jordan in Antalya, Turkey, in a 2–2 draw.

== Career statistics ==
=== International ===
As of match played 1 October 2026

Appearances and goals by national team and year
National team	Year	Apps	Goals
Costa Rica	2026	6	0
Total		6	0
