= Jonathan McDonald =

Costa Rican footballer (born 1987)

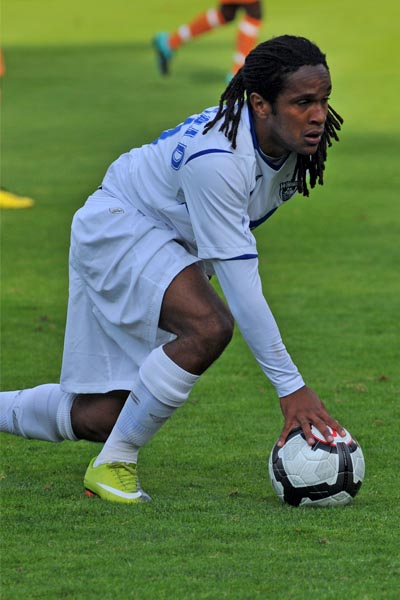
- McDonald in 2010

Personal information
- Full name: Jonathan André McDonald Porras
- Date of birth: October 28, 1987 (age 39)
- Place of birth: San Jose, Costa Rica
- Height: 1.73 m (5 ft 8 in)
- Position: Forward

Team information
- Current team: Herediano
- Number: 19

Youth career
- Carmelita

Senior career*
Years	Team	Apps	(Gls)
2004–2005	Carmelita	3	(0)
2005–2010	Herediano	63	(16)
2010	Vancouver Whitecaps	7	(0)
2010–2011	Alajuelense	38	(21)
2012–2013	Kalmar FF	55	(6)
2014–2019	Alajuelense	179	(94)
2019	Al Ahli	6	(0)
2019–2020	Alajuelense	42	(14)
2020–	Herediano	31	(8)

International career^{‡}
2006–2007	Costa Rica U20	7	(2)
2010	Costa Rica U23	2	(0)
2011–2019	Costa Rica	15	(1)
- * Club domestic league appearances and goals as of 8 November 2021 ‡ National team caps and goals as of 30 June 2019

Jonathan André McDonald Porras (born October 28, 1987) is a Costa Rican professional footballer for Liga FPD club Herediano.

== Career ==
=== Club ===
McDonald made his professional debut as a 16-year-old with AD Carmelita, making three appearances in his first season. In 2006, he moved to top Costa Rican side CS Herediano. During his stay with Herediano he appeared in 41 First Division matches, scoring 17 goals.

McDonald joined the Vancouver Whitecaps on August 5, 2010. He made his Whitecaps debut as a second-half substitute coming on for striker Cornelius Stewart during a 1–0 victory at NSC Minnesota Stars on August 14, and made his first start for Vancouver on September 11 in 3–0 victory at Crystal Palace Baltimore. On October 19, 2010, the Vancouver Whitecaps released McDonald, along with five fellow players, citing their need to purge certain players in preparation for their upcoming promotion to Major League Soccer.

On November 14, 2011, Kalmar FF of Allsvenskan in Sweden announced they had signed McDonald on a three-year contract, starting January 2012.

On 13 November 2019, Al Ahli has signed McDonald for one seasons from Alajuelense.

=== International ===
McDonald has represented his native Costa Rica at both the U-20 and U-23 Olympic levels, and made his debut for the senior side in August 2011, against Ecuador.

=== International goals ===
Scores and results list Costa Rica's goal tally first.

No.	Date	Venue	Opponent	Score	Result	Competition
1.	20 November 2018	Estadio Monumental Virgen de Chapi, Arequipa, Peru	Peru	1–1	3–2	Friendly

=== Trivia ===
As a marketing gag, McDonald changed his name on his jersey during a match (a 0–2 loss on 31 May 2020 against Deportivo Saprissa) to Burger King instead of McDonald.

== Honours ==
Alajuelense

- Liga FPD: Clausura 2011, Apertura 2011

Individual

- Liga FPD Top Scorer: 2017–18
