= Allen Guevara =

Costa Rican footballer (born 1989)

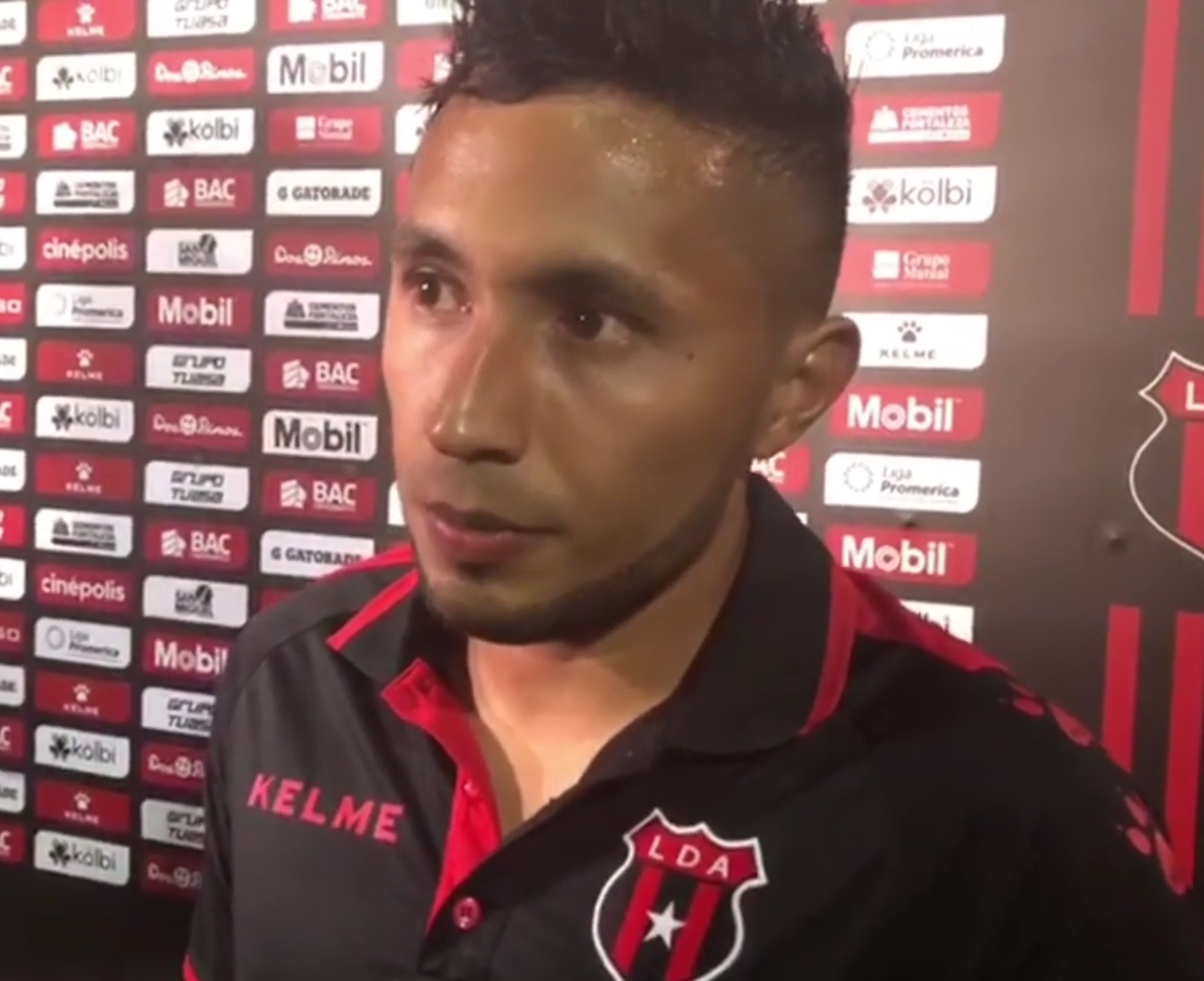

Personal information
- Full name: Allen Esteban Guevara Zúñiga
- Date of birth: 16 April 1989 (age 37)
- Place of birth: Liberia, Costa Rica
- Height: 1.61 m (5 ft 3 1/2 in)
- Position: Winger

Team information
- Current team: Cartaginés
- Number: 7

Youth career
- Municipal Liberia

Senior career*
Years	Team	Apps	(Gls)
2008–2010	Municipal Liberia	56	(3)
2010–2020	Alajuelense	379	(44)
2020–	Cartaginés	209	(37)

International career^{‡}
2009	Costa Rica U20	7	(0)
2011–	Costa Rica	15	(0)
- * Club domestic league appearances and goals as of 7 May 2025 ‡ National team caps and goals as of 3 June 2022

Allen Esteban Guevara Zúñiga (born 16 April 1989) is a Costa Rican professional football player who plays as a winger for Cartaginés.

== International career ==
Guevara played in the 2009 FIFA U-20 World Cup, where Costa Rica under-20 national team placed 4th after losing to Hungary in the match for the 3rd place.
