= Estadio José Rafael Fello Meza Ivankovich =

Multi-use stadium in Cartago, Costa Rica

Estadio José Rafael "Fello" Meza
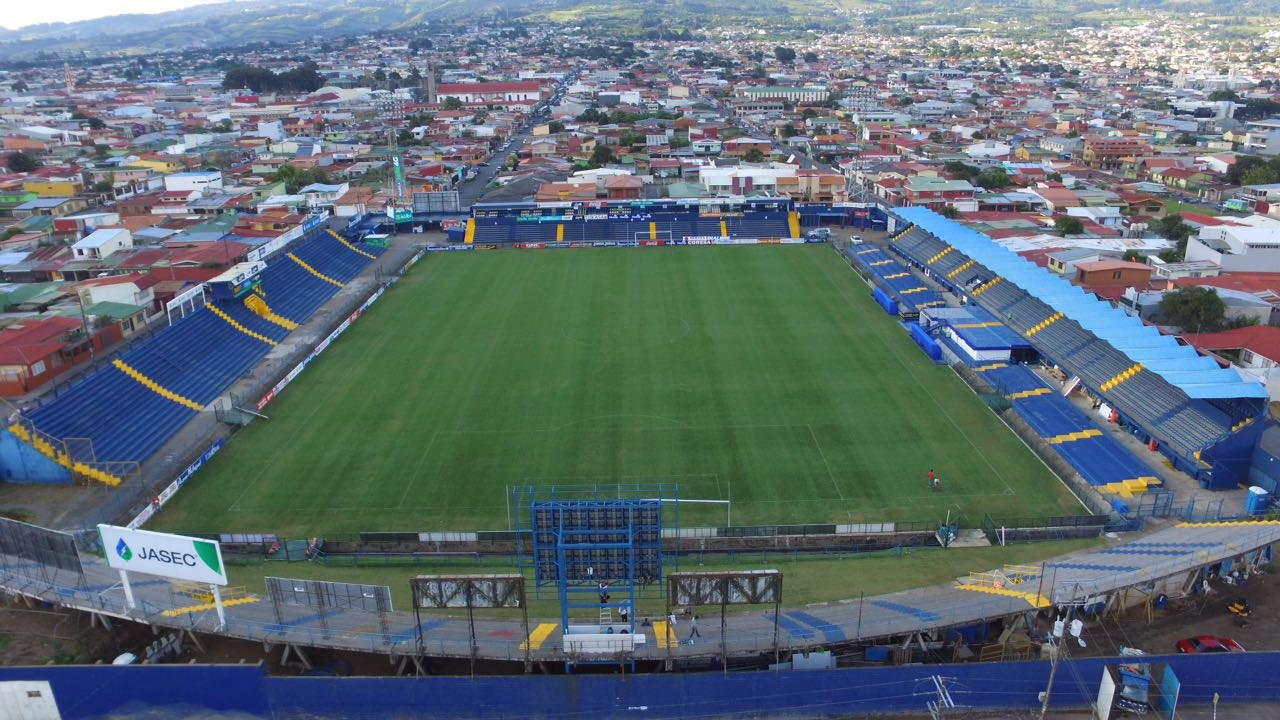
- Interactive map of Estadio José Rafael "Fello" Meza
- Full name: Estadio José Rafael "Fello" Meza Ivankovich
- Location: Cartago, Costa Rica
- Coordinates: 9.8584718°N 83.9187133°W
- Capacity: 8,831
- Surface: Grass
- Field size: 105 m × 68 m (344 ft × 223 ft)

Construction
- Groundbreaking: 1946
- Built: 1946–1949
- Opened: 1949
- Expanded: 2016

Tenant
- Cartaginés

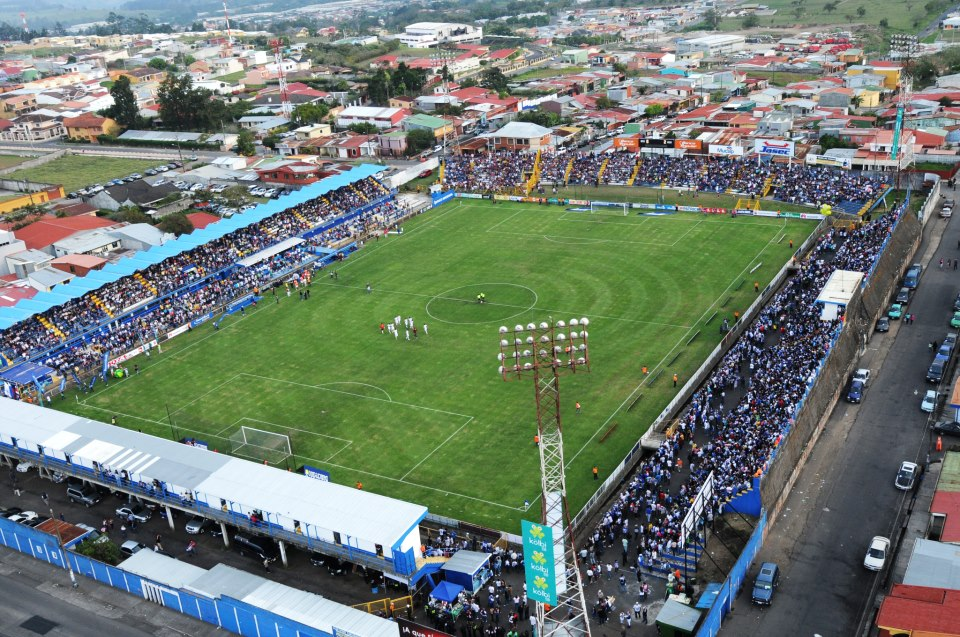

Estadio Jose Rafael "Fello" Meza Ivankovich is a multi-use stadium in Cartago, Costa Rica named after Costa Rican footballer Fello Meza. It is currently used mostly for football matches and is the home stadium of C.S. Cartaginés. The stadium holds 8350 people and was built in 1949.

On June 8, 2024, strong storms and winds hit the city of Cartago and Paraíso. Among the affected areas was the Fello Meza, whose roof was detached and destroyed. A Cartaginés under-21 game was being played, but in the 70th minute it was suspended due to the amount of water falling on the field and in the stands, the ceiling that began to collapse and bend. No injuries were reported, but the cables were affected. The team was forced to use cranes to remove the roof and then rebuild it.
