= Club Sport Uruguay =

Costa Rican football club

Uruguay
- Full name: Club Sport Uruguay de Coronado
- Nicknames: Los Josefinos; El Cuadro Lechero
- Founded: 3 January 1936; 90 years ago
- Ground: Estadio Municipal El Labrador, Coronado, Costa Rica
- Capacity: 2,500
- Chairman: Freddy Campos
- Manager: Marco Antonio Herrera
- League: Liga de Ascenso
- Apertura 2023: 3° - Group B
Home colours	Away colours	Third colours

C.S. Uruguay de Coronado is a Costa Rican football club that competes in the Costa Rican Segunda División.

== History ==
Founded 3 January 1936, they were named after the first FIFA World Cup champions, Uruguay. They changed their first club colors, red and black like Alajuelense, to the yellow and black of Uruguayan giants Peñarol and made their Primera División debut in 1950. In 1961, they became runner-up to champions El Carmen, when the big clubs left the Federación Costarricense de Fútbol and founded their own ASOFUTBOL league and the title was contested between three clubs only: Carmen, Uruguay de Coronado and Gimnástica Española. However, the ASOFUTBOL teams returned to the league and only Uruguay retained their place in the top tier.

In 1963, they surprisingly won the league with players like "Caballo" Otárola, "Camarón" Padilla, Luis Chacón, Carlos Luis "Piche" García and Rodrigo "Riguín" Sandoval.

They played in the Primera División from 1988 until relegation in 1992. Uruguay returned to the top flight in summer 2012.

== Stadium ==
Club Sport Uruguay plays its home games at the El Labrador Municipal Stadium, which bears that name in honor of San Isidro Labrador, Patron Saint of the Cantón of Vázquez de Coronado.

The stadium is located about 250 meters south of the Church of San Isidro de Coronado (central district of the canton). It has a capacity for 2,500 seated people (approximately); its grass is synthetic with a striped design (it was the first with this design in Costa Rica) and has great drainage capacity.

It is municipal property and is under the administration of Club Sport Uruguay since 12/01/2014, thanks to an agreement signed between both parties.

On September 21, 2008, the team said goodbye to the stadium's natural grass, to make way for a high-quality synthetic grass. An eight-lane athletics track was also installed around the pitch and a gymnasium for club and public use. It is currently receiving other works in its infrastructure and has plenty of space around where it is planned to place more bleachers to increase its capacity.

== Honours ==
=== National ===
- Primera División de Costa Rica:
  - Winners (1): 1963
- Costa Rican Super Cup
  - Winners (1): 1963
- Segunda División de Costa Rica
  - Winners (5): 1949, 1960, 1967–68, 1986–87, Clausura 2011
- Tercera División de Costa Rica
  - Winners (1): 1940

== Current squad ==
As of June 7, 2023

Note: Flags indicate national team as defined under FIFA eligibility rules; some limited exceptions apply. Players may hold more than one non-FIFA nationality.

No.	Pos.	Nation	Player
1	GK	CRC	Issac Alfaro
2	MF	CRC	Samir Taylor
3	DF	CRC	Erick Rojas
4	DF	CRC	Joshua Munguia
5	MF	CRC	Carlos Navarro
6	MF	CRC	Emmanuel Pérez
7	MF	CRC	Gustavo Portuguez
8	FW	CRC	Jeiner Ballesteros
9	FW	CRC	Pablo Abarca
10	MF	CRC	Kevin Ortiz
15	DF	CRC	Luis Obando
16	FW	CRC	Brandon Camacho
18	DF	CRC	Athim Rooper

No.	Pos.	Nation	Player
19	DF	CRC	Kenneth González
20	DF	CRC	Erikson Arias
21	DF	CRC	Johel Montero
23	MF	CRC	Jefferson Quintero
24	MF	CRC	Tristan Drummond
25	FW	CRC	Kendall Gallardo
69	MF	CRC	Carlos Coto (Captain)
—	GK	CRC	Brandon Calvo
—	GK	CRC	Joandrick Sánchez
—	DF	CRC	Gerson Salas
—	MF	CRC	Alexander Monge
—	MF	CRC	Eder Navas

== Championship 1963 ==
List of players and coaching staff who won the Costa Rica First Division National Soccer Championship on November 3, 1963.

Note: Flags indicate national team as defined under FIFA eligibility rules; some limited exceptions apply. Players may hold more than one non-FIFA nationality.

No.	Pos.	Nation	Player
—		CRC	Hérberth Ulloa
—		CRC	Germán Sánchez
—		CRC	Rodrigo Sandoval
—		CRC	Enrique Briceño
—		CRC	Fabio Morera Agüero
—		CRC	Luis Chacón
—		CRC	Carlos García
—		CRC	Guillermo Valenciano
—		CRC	Guillermo Padilla
—		CRC	Guillermo Elizondo

No.	Pos.	Nation	Player
—		CRC	Rudy Sobalbarro
—		CRC	Guillermo Otárola
—		CRC	Roberto Montero
—		CRC	Tarciso Rodríguez
—		CRC	Juan de Dios Núñez
—		CRC	Ananías Ruiz
—		CRC	Manuel Soto
—		CRC	Mario Cháves
—		CRC	Miguel Chacón
—		CRC	Jorge Bolaños
