= C.S. Cartaginés =

Association football club in Costa Rica

Cartaginés
- Full name: Club Sport Cartaginés Deportiva S.A.
- Nicknames: Los Azules (The Blues); Brumosos (The Foggers); La Vieja Metrópoli (The Old Metropolis)
- Founded: July 1, 1906; 120 years ago
- Ground: Estadio José Rafael Fello Meza Ivankovich, Cartago, Costa Rica
- Capacity: 13,500
- Chairman: Leonardo Vargas Monge
- Manager: Amarini Villatoro
- League: Liga Promerica
- Apertura 2024: 2°
- Website: cscartagines.com
Home colours	Away colours	Third colours

Club Sport Cartaginés Deportiva S.A., also known as Cartaginés, is a Costa Rican football club, that currently plays in the Liga de Fútbol de Primera División, the top division of Costa Rican football league system. Cartaginés' home venue is Estadio Jose Rafael Fello Meza, located in Barrio Asis of Cartago.

Established in 1906, Cartaginés is currently the oldest club competing at the top division. It has won 4 Costa Rican league championships, 5 national cups, 1 national Supercup, and 1 CONCACAF Champions' Cup (in 1994).

== History ==
Club Sport Cartaginés was founded on July 1, 1906, by Willie Pirie, a Canadian immigrant, together with a group of Costa Ricans of British descent and some England immigrants that lived in Cartago. Since there were few football teams at the time in the country, games were repeatedly held against teams in Cartago such as Combate and Monte Libano. The team's original uniform colors were red and blue. Club Sport Cartaginés' first official match was seen as a local social event as the municipal Philharmonic played prior to the game.

In 1914, Club Sport Cartaginés got into the Costa Rican football scene with a new name: The Americano. The name Americano lasted until 1921 when Costa Rica's Primera División started its national championship. At that time, Americano reverted to its original name of Club Sport Cartaginés and changed their uniform and colors to vertical white and blue stripes, a scheme that still prevails today. The 1923 National Championship Final saw Club Sport Cartaginés face La Libertad, a match that Cartaginés won by a score of two to one giving the club its first of three national titles.

After the seasons many of Cartaginés' players left the team to play in Europe and in teams based in San José. Due to the mass exodus of players from the team Club Sport Cartaginés disbanded in 1925. By 1934 the popularity of football in Cartago reemerged as a tournament of local Cartago teams participated. After the tournament it was decided to form Club Sport Cartaginés once again with the best players that participated in the tournament and to emerge as a third division team winning the third division title in 1935. In 1936 the team managed to be victorious in the Second Division, winning all of its games and being crowned the champions, thus earning them a spot in the top flight.

In their returning season to the First Division, Club Sport Cartaginés once again made it to the Final, and once again facing La Libertad, defeating them by a score of 1-0 and achieving the status of national champions in Costa Rica's national stadium in San Jose. By 1940 Cartaginés only had three players left from its 1936 championship season, but they still managed to make it to the final against heavily favorites Herediano. At half time the score was in favor of the latter as they led 3–1, but Cartaginés fought back in the second half, scoring three goals and beating Herediano by a score of 4–3.

The 1940 Cartaginés team was the last one to win any national league championship for Cartago for the next 81 years, something which a local myth states to be the result of a curse set that year on the team by a priest at the highly revered temple Basílica de Los Ángeles, when the players celebrated their victory by storming the Basilica riding on top of their horses, which was considered sacrilegious. Another myth credits the lack of titles to the curse of "El Muñeco", a strange voodoo-like doll that was supposedly buried under Cartaginés' turf at their stadium in order to prevent them from winning further titles and bringing bad luck to the club.

In the years following the 1940 Championship, the club discovered their currently considered greatest player, José Rafael "Fello" Meza Ivancovich. Within a few years, Jose Rafael became known as "El Maestro", the teacher. He was named so because his new tricks and ways of playing, innovative at the time. The influence of "Fello" Meza was so deep, that the club's current stadium is named in his honor. Also, in 2009 he was included in UNAFUT's (governing body of Costa Rican football clubs) official list of Costa Rica's 100 best players of the 20th century.

In 1966 Cartaginés was the first Costa Rican club to travel to the United States playing against Guadalajara and Emelec. During those years the club assembled one of its most famous squads, called the "Ballet Azul" (Blue Ballet, because their graceful style of play), trained by coach Alfredo "Chato" Piedra, and spearheaded by their current historical top scorer, Leonel Hernández (164 goals), which stayed in the club during his entire career. As a recognition for Hernández for his loyalty, the club retired his jersey number, 11.

Cartaginés struggled during the 80s, a low point being the relegation in 1982 to the second division, which forced a club rebuilding in order to obtain a spot in Costa Rica's Primera División. A breakthrough came for Cartaginés when in 1983 they won the "Segunda" championship, and returned to the top flight, in which has remained since then. In 1987 they lost the championship final to Herediano.

In the 90s, the club was unable to break Saprissa and Alajuelense's hold on the top position, finishing runners-up in 1993 and 1996. The former season, however, allowed them to participate and win the CONCACAF Champions' Cup in 1994, their current biggest achievement, defeating Mexican club Atlante 3–2 in the final.

In the 21st century, the club tried to push for the championship during the 2000s and 2010s decades, with a runners-up position in the 2012-2013 season their best league result. However, they won the 2014 and 2015 editions of the Costa Rican Cup, the national knockout football competition. Their most decorated player of this period was Randall Brenes, known as "Chiqui", which in 2017 became the second striker of the club (after Leonel Hernández) to reach the 100 league goals cap, and retired with a total of 103 in 280 appearances.

The long wait for the national title was over for the 2021-2022 season, when Cartaginés defeated Liga Deportiva Alajuelense (2–1 aggregate) in the Clausura final to win their 4th league championship. Those days Cartago was filled with people celebrating with bugles and flags that finally, after 81 years, they had won the tournament. They also won that year the Costa Rican Cup for the third consecutive time, defeating Herediano in the final (3–2 aggregate).

== Stadium ==
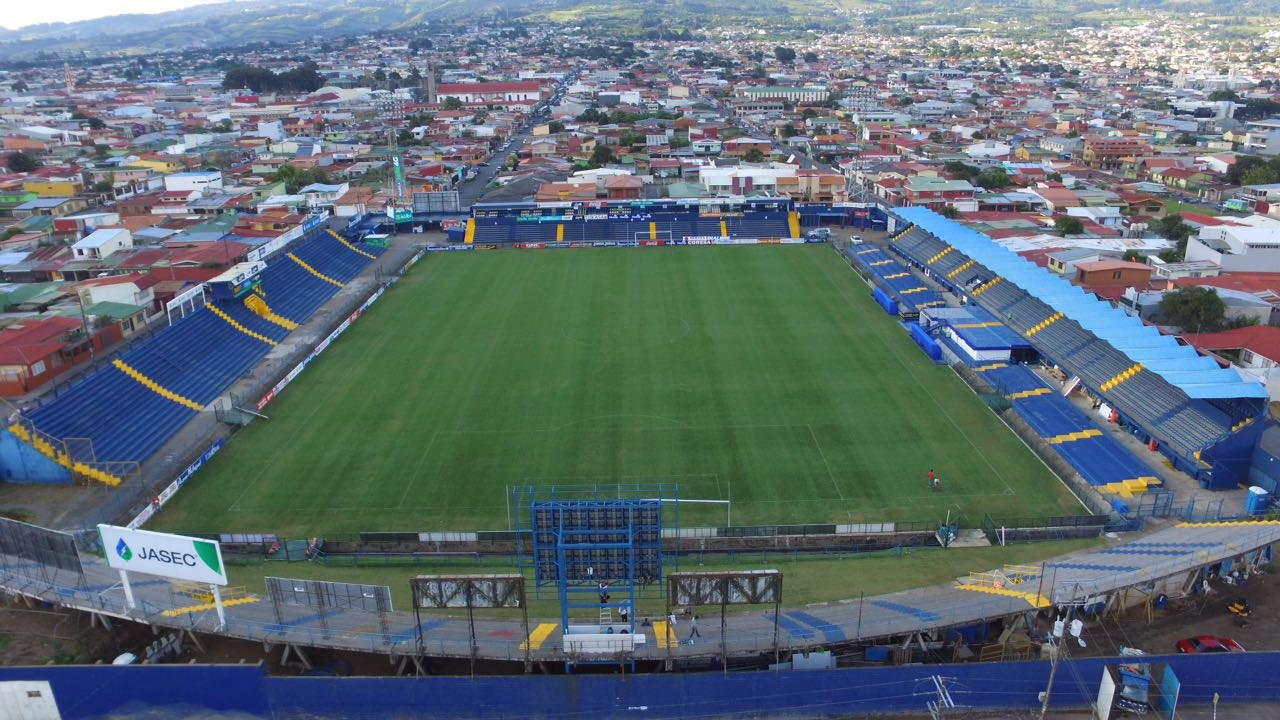
Aerial take of José Rafael "Fello" Meza Stadium

The stadium Jose Rafael "Fello" Meza is located in Barrio Asis in Cartago, it has a capacity of 13,500 and is the fourth of the highest capacity stadiums in Costa Rica.

== Honours ==
=== Domestic ===
- Primera División de Costa Rica
  - Winners (4): 1923, 1936, 1940, 2022 Clausura
- Costa Rican Cup
  - Winners (5): 1963, 1984, 2014, 2015, 2022
- Costa Rican Super Cup
  - Winners (1): 1979

=== International ===
- CONCACAF Champions' Cup
  - Winners (1): 1994
- Copa Interamericana
  - Runners-up (1): 1994
- Copa Fraternidad: 1 appearance
  - Runners-up (1): 1978

== Current squad ==
As of 21 August, 2026.

Note: Flags indicate national team as defined under FIFA eligibility rules; some limited exceptions apply. Players may hold more than one non-FIFA nationality.

No.	Pos.	Nation	Player
1	GK	CRC	Kevin Briceño
2	DF	CRC	Randal Cordero
3	DF	CRC	Fernán Faerrón
4	DF	MEX	Luis Olivas
6	MF	CRC	Claudio Montero
7	FW	PAN	Manuel Morán
8	MF	CRC	Douglas López
9	FW	MEX	José González
11	MF	CRC	Leonardo Alfaro
12	DF	CRC	José Luis Quirós
13	FW	CHI	Juan Carlos Gaete
14	MF	CRC	Andrés Rodríguez
15	MF	CRC	Luis Flores
16	MF	CRC	Geancarlo Castro

No.	Pos.	Nation	Player
17	DF	CRC	Yael López
18	DF	CRC	Carlos Barahona
19	DF	MEX	Diego González
20	DF	CRC	Diego Mesén
22	FW	USA	Alonso Hernández
26	MF	CRC	Bernald Alfaro
29	FW	CRC	Nicolás Vargas
30	MF	CRC	Andrey Mora
31	MF	CRC	Gian Mauro Morera
33	GK	CRC	Christopher Moya
34	GK	CRC	Darién Hidalgo
33	DF	CRC	Emmanuel Brenes
39	FW	CRC	Mauricio Villalobos

=== Out on loan ===
Note: Flags indicate national team as defined under FIFA eligibility rules; some limited exceptions apply. Players may hold more than one non-FIFA nationality.

No.	Pos.	Nation	Player

== Retired numbers ==
11 – (Costa Rica) Leonel Hernández, Winger (1957–77)

== Player records ==
Most appearances
Rank	Nat.	Player	Tenure	Apps
1	Costa Rica	Danny Fonseca	1998–2018	537
2	Costa Rica	Paolo Jiménez	2003–2022	392
3	Costa Rica	Leonel Hernández	1957–1977	360
4	Costa Rica	Marco Tulio Hidalgo	1985–1998	329
4	Costa Rica	Miguel Calvo	1982–1993	329

Most goals
Rank	Nat.	Player	Tenure	Goals
1	Costa Rica	Leonel Hernández	1957–1977	164
2	Costa Rica	Randall Brenes	2004–2018	103
3	Costa Rica	Walford 'Wally' Vaughns	1964–1978	78
4	Costa Rica	Marcel Hernández Campanioni	2018-2023	74
5	Costa Rica	Alexis Goñi Fonseca	1950-1961	71

Honorable mention to Bernald Mullins Campbell, who almost entered the historic list of Club Sport Cartaginés'goal scorers

== Historical list of coaches ==
- (Costa Rica) Giovanny Alfaro
- (Costa Rica) Rodolfo Arias
- (Czech Republic) Ivan Mráz
- (Costa Rica) Fello Meza (1950s)
- (Spain) Carlos Farres (1965)
- (Costa Rica) Alfredo Piedra (1965–74)
- (Costa Rica) Marvin Rodríguez (1968–70)
- (Argentina) Armando Mareque (1973), (1975), (1990)
- (Uruguay) Luis Borghini (1973), (1975)
- (Costa Rica) Walter Elizondo (1977), (1979)
- (Costa Rica) Álvaro Grant (1982)
- (Costa Rica) Juan José Gámez (1982–86)
- (Uruguay) Gustavo de Simone (1987)
- (Honduras) Chelato Uclés (1990–91)
- (Brazil) (Honduras) Flavio Ortega (1994)
- (Costa Rica) Rolando Villalobos (1995–96)
- (Costa Rica) Juan José Gámez (1996–97)
- (Costa Rica) Miguel Calvo (1997–99)
- (Uruguay) José Matera (1999–00)
- (Spain) Juan Luis Hernández (2000), (2004–05)
- (Czech Republic) Josef Pešice (Jan 1, 2001 – June 30, 2001)
- (Czech Republic) Michal Bílek (July 1, 2001–02)
- (Argentina) Carlos de Toro (2002–03)
- (Costa Rica) Alexandre Guimarães (2003)
- (Costa Rica) Marvin Rodríguez (2004)
- (Uruguay) Carlos Linaris (2004–05)
- (Costa Rica) Rónald Mora (2005–06)
- (Argentina) Luis Manuel Blanco (2006 – June 30, 2006), (Jan 1, 2008 – Feb 26, 2008)
- (Spain) Juan Luis Hernández (Feb 26, 2008 – June 30, 2010)
- (Costa Rica) Johnny Chaves (July 1, 2010 – Aug 28, 2012)
- (Brazil) Odir Jaques (Aug 28, 2012 – Nov 1, 2012)
- (Costa Rica) Rolando Villalobos (interim) (Nov 2, 2012 – Dec 31, 2012)
- (Costa Rica) Javier Delgado (Jan 1, 2013 – March 31, 2014)
- (Uruguay) Claudio Ciccia (April 1, 2014 – June 30, 2014)
- (Costa Rica) Mauricio Wright (July 1, 2014 – December 22, 2014)
- (Mexico) Enrique Meza Jr. (Dec 23, 2014 – March 12, 2015)
- (Uruguay) Claudio Ciccia (March 13, 2015 – August 2015)
- (Uruguay) César Eduardo Méndez (August 2015 – April 2016)
- (Costa Rica) Jeaustin Campos (April 2016 –)
- (Costa Rica) Adrián Leandro (2017–18)
- (Costa Rica) Greivin Mora (2018)
- (Uruguay) Gustavo Roverano (2018)
- (Costa Rica) Paulo Wanchope (2018)
- (Uruguay) Martín Arriola (2018–19)
- (Costa Rica) Hernán Medford (2019–21)
- (Costa Rica) Géiner Segura (2021–22)
- (Costa Rica) Paulo Wanchope (2022–23)
- (Costa Rica) Mauricio Wright (2023)
- (Mexico) Mario García (2023–24)
- (Costa Rica) Greivin Mora (2024)
- (Argentina) Andrés Carevic (2025–Present)
