= 2005 UNCAF Nations Cup squads =

Below are the rosters for the UNCAF Nations Cup 2005 tournament in Guatemala, from February 19 to 27, 2005.

== Group A ==
=== Belize ===
Head coach: (Belize) Anthony Adderly

No.	Pos.	Player	Date of birth (age)	Caps	Goals	Club
1	GK	Shane Moody-Orio	7 August 1980 (aged 24)	5	0	(Football Federation of Belize) Boca FC
2	DF	Albert Thurton	4 June 1977 (aged 27)	0	0	(Football Federation of Belize) Kulture Yabra
3	DF	Vallan Symms	20 March 1980 (aged 24)	9	2	(Football Federation of Belize) Kulture Yabra
4	DF	Dalton Eiley	10 December 1983 (aged 21)	0	0	(Football Federation of Belize) Placencia Pirates
5	MF	Raúl Celiz	30 August 1977 (aged 27)	7	1	(Football Federation of Belize) Juventus
6	MF	Bernard Linarez	29 October 1985 (aged 19)	0	0	(Football Federation of Belize) Placencia Pirates
8	FW	Giovanni Celize	11 September 1985 (aged 19)	0	0	(Football Federation of Belize) Verdes FC
9	MF	Norman Pipersburgh	12 June 1971 (aged 33)	8	3	(Football Federation of Belize) Kulture Yabra
10	MF	Harrison Roches	29 November 1983 (aged 21)	1	0	(Football Federation of Belize) Boca FC
12	FW	Trevor Lennan	5 June 1983 (aged 21)	0	0	(Football Federation of Belize) Verdes FC
14	MF	Gilmore Palacio	11 October 1982 (aged 22)	0	0	(Football Federation of Belize) San Pedro Seahawks
15	FW	Víctor Morales	11 July 1982 (aged 22)	2	0	(Football Federation of Belize) Boca FC
17	MF	Jorge Dorado	17 April 1985 (aged 19)	1	0	(Football Federation of Belize) Verdes FC
18	DF	Orland Lyons	25 September 1983 (aged 21)	4	0	(Football Federation of Belize) Kulture Yabra
19	DF	Elroy Smith	30 November 1981 (aged 23)	2	0	(Football Federation of Belize) Print Belize
20	DF	Jarbi Álvarez	1 November 1976 (aged 28)	2	0	(Football Federation of Belize) San Pedro Seahawks
22	MF	Carlos Slusher	28 November 1971 (aged 33)	8	0	(Football Federation of Belize) Kulture Yabra
23	GK	Woodrow West	19 September 1985 (aged 19)	0	0	(Football Federation of Belize) San Isidro Eagles

=== Guatemala ===
Head coach: (Honduras) Ramón Maradiaga

No.	Pos.	Player	Date of birth (age)	Caps	Goals	Club
1	GK	Miguel Ángel Klée	19 February 1977 (aged 28)	10	0	(National Football Federation of Guatemala) Cobán Imperial
2	DF	Nelson Morales	20 September 1976 (aged 28)	22	0	(National Football Federation of Guatemala) Cobán Imperial
6	DF	Gustavo Cabrera	13 December 1979 (aged 25)	36	0	(National Football Federation of Guatemala) Comunicaciones
8	MF	Gonzalo Romero	25 March 1975 (aged 29)	38	3	(National Football Federation of Guatemala) Municipal
9	MF	Carlos Castillo	14 September 1977 (aged 27)	10	1	(National Football Federation of Guatemala) Xelajú
10	FW	Edwin Villatoro	18 February 1980 (aged 25)	3	1	(National Football Federation of Guatemala) Suchitepéquez
11	MF	Guillermo Ramírez	26 March 1978 (aged 26)	63	9	(National Football Federation of Guatemala) Municipal
12	MF	Carlos Figueroa	19 April 1980 (aged 24)	13	3	(National Football Federation of Guatemala) Municipal
13	DF	Néstor Martínez	13 March 1981 (aged 23)	30	0	(National Football Federation of Guatemala) Comunicaciones
14	MF	Andrés Rivera	25 June 1978 (aged 26)	9	3	(National Football Federation of Guatemala) Xelajú
15	FW	Juan Carlos Plata	1 January 1971 (aged 34)	68	30	(National Football Federation of Guatemala) Municipal
16	FW	José Zacarías Antonio	15 March 1982 (aged 22)	15	0	(National Football Federation of Guatemala) Xelajú
18	MF	Carlos Quiñónez	20 July 1977 (aged 27)	6	0	(National Football Federation of Guatemala) Comunicaciones
23	FW	Hernán Sandoval	22 July 1983 (aged 21)	4	0	(National Football Federation of Guatemala) Comunicaciones
24	MF	Maynor Dávila	12 February 1982 (aged 23)	12	1	(National Football Federation of Guatemala) Aurora
25	GK	Paulo César Motta	29 March 1983 (aged 21)	4	0	(National Football Federation of Guatemala) Municipal
26	DF	Ángel Sanabria	26 July 1984 (aged 20)	14	0	(National Football Federation of Guatemala) Cobán Imperial
27	DF	Elton Gerson Brown	20 November 1980 (aged 24)	2	0	(National Football Federation of Guatemala) Deportivo Heredia

=== Honduras ===
Head coach: (Honduras) José de la Paz Herrera

No.	Pos.	Player	Date of birth (age)	Caps	Goals	Club
1	GK	Víctor Coello	10 April 1974 (aged 30)	18	0	(National Autonomous Federation of Football of Honduras) Marathón
3	DF	Astor Henriquez	26 February 1983 (aged 21)	0	0	(National Autonomous Federation of Football of Honduras) Pumas UNAH
5	DF	Milton Reyes	2 May 1974 (aged 30)	33	0	(National Autonomous Federation of Football of Honduras) Motagua
6	DF	Sergio Mendoza	23 May 1981 (aged 23)	15	0	(National Autonomous Federation of Football of Honduras) Real España
8	MF	Wilson Palacios	29 July 1984 (aged 20)	15	0	(National Autonomous Federation of Football of Honduras) Olimpia
9	FW	Luis Ramírez	21 November 1977 (aged 27)	2	1	(National Autonomous Federation of Football of Honduras) Victoria
10	FW	Wilmer Velásquez	28 April 1972 (aged 32)	28	16	(National Autonomous Federation of Football of Honduras) Olimpia
11	FW	Milton Núñez	30 November 1972 (aged 32)	66	24	(National Autonomous Federation of Football of Honduras) Marathón
12	MF	Elkin González	29 September 1980 (aged 24)	7	0	(National Autonomous Federation of Football of Honduras) Real España
13	MF	Dennis Ferrera	3 December 1980 (aged 24)	0	0	(National Autonomous Federation of Football of Honduras) Marathón
15	DF	Darwin Pacheco	24 July 1976 (aged 28)	0	0	(National Autonomous Federation of Football of Honduras) Marathón
16	MF	Walter Lopez	1 September 1977 (aged 27)	6	1	(National Autonomous Federation of Football of Honduras) Olimpia
17	DF	Érick Vallecillo	29 January 1980 (aged 25)	9	0	(National Autonomous Federation of Football of Honduras) Real España
19	DF	Mario Berrios	29 May 1982 (aged 22)	1	0	(National Autonomous Federation of Football of Honduras) Marathón
20	DF	Hendry Thomas	23 February 1985 (aged 19)	0	0	(National Autonomous Federation of Football of Honduras) Olimpia
22	GK	Junior Morales	4 March 1978 (aged 26)	4	0	(National Autonomous Federation of Football of Honduras) Real España
23	MF	Iván Guerrero	30 November 1977 (aged 27)	51	3	(United States Soccer Federation) Chicago Fire
24	DF	Carlos Morán	19 July 1984 (aged 20)	0	0	(National Autonomous Federation of Football of Honduras) Victoria

=== Nicaragua ===
Head coach: (Argentina) Marcelo Zuleta

No.	Pos.	Player	Date of birth (age)	Caps	Goals	Club
1	GK	Denis Espinoza	25 August 1983 (aged 21)	1	0	(Nicaraguan Football Federation) Diriangén
2	DF	Hevel Quintanilla	14 November 1977 (aged 27)	11	0	(Nicaraguan Football Federation) Diriangén
3	DF	Ezequiel Jérez	30 April 1971 (aged 33)	15	1	(Nicaraguan Football Federation) Deportivo Masatepe
4	DF	Elvis Balladares	15 November 1979 (aged 25)	4	0	(Nicaraguan Football Federation) Deportivo Masatepe
5	DF	Juan Carlos Vílchez	18 April 1980 (aged 24)	6	0	(Nicaraguan Football Federation) Diriangén
6	DF	Carlos Alonso	25 August 1979 (aged 25)	20	0	(Nicaraguan Football Federation) Real Estelí
7	MF	Tyron Acevedo	12 July 1978 (aged 26)	17	0	(Nicaraguan Football Federation) Diriangén
8	MF	Franklin López	16 August 1982 (aged 22)	4	1	(Nicaraguan Football Federation) Diriangén
9	MF	Sergio Iván Rodríguez	20 May 1977 (aged 27)	11	0	(Nicaraguan Football Federation) Real Estelí
10	MF	Milton Busto	19 April 1982 (aged 22)	2	0	(Nicaraguan Football Federation) Diriangén
11	FW	Rudel Calero	20 December 1982 (aged 22)	14	3	(Nicaraguan Football Federation) Real Estelí
12	FW	Armando Ismael Reyes	29 July 1981 (aged 23)	4	0	(Nicaraguan Football Federation) Deportivo Bluefields
13	FW	Miguel Ángel Sánchez	2 July 1980 (aged 24)	4	0	(Nicaraguan Football Federation) Diriangén
14	DF	Eustace Martín	21 December 1983 (aged 21)	0	0	(Nicaraguan Football Federation) Parmalat
15	DF	Jaime Raúl Ruíz	24 August 1981 (aged 23)	9	0	(Nicaraguan Football Federation) Real Estelí
16	MF	Mario Acevedo	12 July 1972 (aged 32)	8	0	(National Football Federation of Guatemala) Antigua Guatemala
17	DF	Silvio Avilés	11 August 1980 (aged 24)	7	0	(Nicaraguan Football Federation) Diriangén
25	GK	Carlos Mendieta	3 November 1979 (aged 25)	2	0	(Nicaraguan Football Federation) Parmalat

== Group B ==
=== Costa Rica ===
Head coach: (Colombia) Jorge Luis Pinto

No.	Pos.	Player	Date of birth (age)	Caps	Goals	Club
1	GK	Donny Grant	12 April 1976 (aged 28)	0	0	(Costa Rican Football Federation) Municipal Pérez Zeledón
3	DF	Michael Umaña	16 July 1982 (aged 22)	3	0	(Costa Rican Football Federation) Herediano
4	DF	Alexander Castro	14 February 1979 (aged 26)	21	0	(Costa Rican Football Federation) Alajuelense
6	MF	Danny Fonseca	7 November 1979 (aged 25)	7	0	(Costa Rican Football Federation) Cartaginés
7	FW	Jhonny Cubero	23 February 1976 (aged 28)	1	0	(National Football Federation of Guatemala) Comunicaciones
8	DF	Berny Peña	19 October 1980 (aged 24)	1	0	(Costa Rican Football Federation) Municipal Liberia
10	MF	Alonso Solís	14 October 1978 (aged 26)	20	3	(Costa Rican Football Federation) Saprissa
11	MF	Jafet Soto	1 April 1976 (aged 28)	46	7	(Costa Rican Football Federation) Herediano
12	DF	Roy Miller	24 November 1984 (aged 20)	1	0	(Costa Rican Football Federation) Cartaginés
13	MF	Géiner Segura	14 October 1974 (aged 30)	2	0	(Costa Rican Football Federation) Municipal Pérez Zeledón
14	MF	Cristian Badilla	11 July 1978 (aged 26)	9	0	(Costa Rican Football Federation) Herediano
15	DF	Junior Díaz	12 September 1983 (aged 21)	5	0	(Costa Rican Football Federation) Herediano
17	FW	Ever Alfaro	1 October 1982 (aged 22)	1	1	(Costa Rican Football Federation) Municipal Pérez Zeledón
18	GK	José Francisco Porras	8 November 1970 (aged 34)	5	0	(Costa Rican Football Federation) Saprissa
19	MF	Roy Myrie	21 August 1982 (aged 22)	1	0	(Costa Rican Football Federation) Alajuelense
20	DF	Douglas Sequeira	23 August 1977 (aged 27)	10	1	(Costa Rican Football Federation) Saprissa
21	FW	Whayne Wilson	7 September 1975 (aged 29)	2	0	(Costa Rican Football Federation) Brujas
22	FW	Erick Scott	21 May 1981 (aged 23)	22	6	(Costa Rican Football Federation) Alajuelense

=== El Salvador ===
Head coach: (Argentina) Carlos Cavagnaro

No.	Pos.	Player	Date of birth (age)	Caps	Goals	Club
1	GK	Álvaro Misael Alfaro	6 January 1971 (aged 34)	37	0	(Salvadoran Football Federation) Alianza
2	DF	José Rafael Tobar	24 November 1975 (aged 29)	4	0	(Salvadoran Football Federation) FAS
3	DF	Marvin González	17 April 1982 (aged 22)	22	0	(Salvadoran Football Federation) FAS
4	DF	Marvin Benítez	14 August 1974 (aged 30)	13	0	(Salvadoran Football Federation) Águila
5	DF	Víctor Velásquez	12 April 1976 (aged 28)	43	4	(Salvadoran Football Federation) FAS
6	DF	Erick Dowson Prado	24 January 1976 (aged 29)	19	0	(Salvadoran Football Federation) Isidro Metapán
7	MF	Cristian Álvarez	19 April 1978 (aged 26)	10	0	(Salvadoran Football Federation) FAS
8	MF	Emerson Umaña	12 November 1981 (aged 23)	0	0	(Salvadoran Football Federation) FAS
9	FW	Alexander Campos	8 May 1980 (aged 24)	11	0	(Salvadoran Football Federation) Águila
12	DF	Deris Umanzor	7 January 1980 (aged 25)	17	1	(Salvadoran Football Federation) Águila
13	MF	Dennis Alas	10 January 1985 (aged 20)	14	0	(Salvadoran Football Federation) San Salvador
14	FW	Rudis Corrales	6 November 1979 (aged 25)	28	4	(Salvadoran Football Federation) Águila
15	DF	Alexander Escobar	4 April 1984 (aged 20)	4	0	(Salvadoran Football Federation) Isidro Metapán
16	MF	Isaac Zelaya	3 October 1985 (aged 19)	2	0	(Salvadoran Football Federation) Luis Ángel Firpo
18	MF	Gilberto Murgas	22 January 1981 (aged 24)	29	4	(Salvadoran Football Federation) FAS
19	DF	Alfredo Pacheco	1 December 1982 (aged 22)	22	3	(Salvadoran Football Federation) FAS
23	FW	José Martínez	30 September 1979 (aged 25)	21	2	(Salvadoran Football Federation) Luis Ángel Firpo
25	GK	Santos Rivera	8 April 1974 (aged 30)	21	0	(Salvadoran Football Federation) Municipal Limeño

=== Panama ===
Head coach: (Colombia) José Hernández

No.	Pos.	Player	Date of birth (age)	Caps	Goals	Club
1	GK	Donaldo González	27 November 1971 (aged 33)	24	0	(National Autonomous Federation of Football of Honduras) Marathón
2	DF	Joel Solanilla	24 December 1983 (aged 21)	5	0	(Panamanian Football Federation) Plaza Amador
3	DF	Luis Moreno	19 March 1981 (aged 23)	26	0	(Panamanian Football Federation) Tauro
4	DF	José Anthony Torres	27 August 1972 (aged 32)	39	0	(National Autonomous Federation of Football of Honduras) Marathón
5	DF	Luis Henríquez	23 November 1981 (aged 23)	17	0	(Panamanian Football Federation) Árabe Unido
6	MF	Engin Mitre	16 October 1981 (aged 23)	14	0	(Panamanian Football Federation) Plaza Amador
7	FW	Blas Pérez	13 March 1981 (aged 23)	11	0	(Colombian Football Federation) Centauros Villavicencio
8	MF	Gabriel Enrique Gómez	29 May 1984 (aged 20)	12	0	(Colombian Football Federation) Deportivo Pasto
9	FW	José Luis Garcés	6 May 1981 (aged 23)	10	3	(Panamanian Football Federation) San Francisco
10	MF	Julio Medina III	14 July 1976 (aged 28)	28	0	(Salvadoran Football Federation) Águila
11	MF	Amílcar Henríquez	2 August 1983 (aged 21)	0	0	(Panamanian Football Federation) Árabe Unido
12	GK	Jaime Penedo	26 September 1981 (aged 23)	10	0	(Panamanian Football Federation) Árabe Unido
13	MF	Juan Ramón Solís	14 June 1984 (aged 20)	4	1	(Panamanian Football Federation) San Francisco
14	DF	Armando Gun	17 January 1986 (aged 19)	1	0	(Panamanian Football Federation) Chorrillo
15	FW	Ricardo Phillips	31 January 1975 (aged 30)	34	6	(Panamanian Football Federation) Tauro
16	MF	William Aguilar	8 May 1982 (aged 22)	10	0	(Panamanian Football Federation) Tauro
18	FW	Orlando Rodríguez	9 August 1984 (aged 20)	2	0	(Panamanian Football Federation) Árabe Unido
20	DF	Juan Carlos Cubillas	20 October 1971 (aged 33)	53	2	(Panamanian Football Federation) Tauro
