= Costa Rica national football team results (2000–2009) =

Below are listed all the matches played by the Costa Rica national football team between 2000 and 2009.

== Results ==
=== 2000 ===
26 January Friendly	Costa Rica	2–1	Trinidad and Tobago	San Juan de Tibás, Costa Rica
20:00 (UTC−6)	López 55'; Soto 79'	Report	40' Trotman	Stadium: Estadio Ricardo Saprissa Aymá; Referee: Édgar Rangel (Mexico)

2 February Friendly	Costa Rica	1–0	Chile	San Juan de Tibás, Costa Rica
20:00 (UTC−6)	Alfaro 79'	Report		Stadium: Estadio Ricardo Saprissa Aymá; Referee: Rafael Rodríguez (El Salvador)

13 February Gold Cup GS	Costa Rica	2–2	Canada	San Diego, United States
12:00 (UTC−5)	Soto 11'; Wallace 54'	Report	19' (pen.), 57' Corazzin	Stadium: Qualcomm Stadium; Attendance: 22,131; Referee: Peter Prendergast (Jamaica)

17 February Gold Cup GS	South Korea	2–2	Costa Rica	Los Angeles, United States
21:00 (UTC−5)	Lee Dong-gook 14'; Lee Min-sung 75'	Report	66' Wanchope; 85' Medford	Stadium: Los Angeles Memorial Coliseum; Attendance: 54,246; Referee: Argelio Sabillón (Honduras)

20 February Gold Cup QF	Costa Rica	1–2 (a.e.t.)	Trinidad and Tobago	San Diego, United States
12:00 (UTC−5)	Wanchope 89'	Report	26' Dwarika; 101' Trotman	Stadium: Qualcomm Stadium; Attendance: 18,062; Referee: Kim Young-yoo (South Korea)

21 June Friendly	Paraguay	1–0	Costa Rica	Ciudad del Este, Paraguay
6:30 (UTC−4)	Paredes 51'	Report		Stadium: Estadio Antonio Oddone Sarubbi; Referee: Robert Troxler (Paraguay)

1 July Friendly	Costa Rica	5–1	Panama	Alajuela, Costa Rica
20:00 (UTC−6)	Fonseca 24', 70', 75'; Centeno 45'; Wanchope 90+3'	Report	22' Brown	Stadium: Estadio Alejandro Morera Soto; Referee: Carlos Torres (Costa Rica)

9 July Friendly	Costa Rica	7–1	Saint Vincent and the Grenadines	San Juan de Tibás, Costa Rica
11:00 (UTC−6)	Wanchope 42', 76'; Medford 52', 56', 75'; Robinson 87'; Soto 90'	Report	72' Velox	Stadium: Estadio Ricardo Saprissa Aymá; Referee: José Araya (Costa Rica)

16 July 2002 FIFA WCQ	Barbados	2–1	Costa Rica	Bridgetown, Barbados
20:00 (UTC−4)	Riley 49'; Forde 89'	Report	Madrigal 48'	Stadium: Barbados National Stadium; Attendance: 8,000; Referee: Mauricio Navarro (Canada)

23 July 2002 FIFA WCQ	Costa Rica	2–1	United States	San Juan de Tibás, Costa Rica
11:00 (UTC−6)	Fonseca 9'; Medford 90+1' (pen.)	Report	66' Stewart	Stadium: Estadio Ricardo Saprissa Aymá; Attendance: 17,000; Referee: Peter Prendergast (Jamaica)

10 August Friendly	Costa Rica	1–5	Venezuela	Alajuela, Costa Rica
20:00 (UTC−6)	Robinson 14'	Report	2', 25' Urdaneta; 5' Rey; 62' de Ornelas; 88' Álvarez	Stadium: Estadio Alejandro Morera Soto; Referee: Carlos Torres (Paraguay)

15 August 2002 FIFA WCQ	Costa Rica	2–1	Guatemala	Alajuela, Costa Rica
11:00 (UTC−6)	Wanchope 34', 58'	Report	68' Pezzarossi	Stadium: Estadio Alejandro Morera Soto; Attendance: 18,000; Referee: Argelio Sabillón (Honduras)

3 September 2002 FIFA WCQ	Costa Rica	3–0	Barbados	San Juan de Tibás, Costa Rica
11:00 (UTC−6)	Soto 35'; Fonseca 40'; Medford 54'	Report		Stadium: Estadio Ricardo Saprissa Aymá; Attendance: 17,000; Referee: Manlio Brizio (Mexico)

11 October 2002 FIFA WCQ	United States	0–0	Costa Rica	Columbus, United States
20:00 (UTC−4)		Report		Stadium: Columbus Crew Stadium; Attendance: 24,430; Referee: Ramesh Ramdhan (Trinidad and Tobago)

15 November 2002 FIFA WCQ	Guatemala	2–1	Costa Rica	Mazatenango, Guatemala
13:00 (UTC−6)	Ruiz 51', 87'	Report	74' Fonseca	Stadium: Estadio Carlos Salazar Hijo; Attendance: 10,400; Referee: Antonio Marrufo (Mexico)

=== 2001 ===
6 January 2002 FIFA WCQ	Costa Rica	5–2	Guatemala	Miami, United States
20:00 (UTC−5)	Wanchope 6'; Fonseca 43', 59'; Parks 58'; Soto 87'	Report	3', 89' (pen.) Ruiz	Stadium: Miami Orange Bowl; Attendance: 41,000; Referee: Rodolfo Sibrian (El Salvador)

28 February 2002 FIFA WCQ	Costa Rica	2–2	Honduras	San Juan de Tibás, Costa Rica
20:00 (UTC−6)	Fonseca 65'; Cordero 90+4'	Report	3' Pineda; 85' Núñez	Stadium: Estadio Ricardo Saprissa Aymá; Attendance: 20,000; Referee: Ali Bujsaim (United Arab Emirates)

28 March 2002 FIFA WCQ	Costa Rica	3–0	Trinidad and Tobago	Alajuela, Costa Rica
20:00 (UTC−6)	Bryce 46'; Wanchope 80', 89'	Report		Stadium: Estadio Alejandro Morera Soto; Attendance: 17,500; Referee: Kim Young-joo (South Korea)

18 April Friendly	Costa Rica	2–2	Venezuela	Alajuela, Costa Rica
20:00 (UTC−6)	Fonseca 35'; Díaz 83'	Report	61' Rondón; 88' (o.g.) Arias	Stadium: Estadio Alejandro Morera Soto; Referee: Rónald Cedeño (Costa Rica)

25 April 2002 FIFA WCQ	United States	1–0	Costa Rica	Kansas City, United States
18:30 (UTC−5)	Wolff 69'	Report		Stadium: Arrowhead Stadium; Attendance: 37,319; Referee: Jorge Larrionda (Uruguay)

23 May UNCAF first round	Costa Rica	4–0	Belize	San Pedro Sula, Honduras
17:30 (UTC−6)	Fonseca 27' (pen.), 37', 85'; Marín 58'	Report		Stadium: Estadio Olímpico Metropolitano; Referee: Nery Alfaro (El Salvador)

27 May UNCAF first round	Costa Rica	1–1	Guatemala	San Pedro Sula, Honduras
15:30 (UTC−6)	Núñez 44'	Report	70' (pen.) Mario Acevedo	Stadium: Estadio Olímpico Metropolitano; Referee: Germán Arredondo (Mexico)

30 May UNCAF final round	Costa Rica	2–1	Panama	San Pedro Sula, Honduras
19:30 (UTC−6)	Gómez 42'; Centeno 80'	Report	47' Ju. Dely	Stadium: Estadio Olímpico Metropolitano; Attendance: 160; Referee: Germán Arredondo (Mexico)

1 June UNCAF final round	Costa Rica	0–2	Guatemala	San Pedro Sula, Honduras
19:30 (UTC−6)		Report	1' Pezzarossi; 51' Estrada	Stadium: Estadio Olímpico Metropolitano; Referee: Óscar Bardales (Honduras)

3 June UNCAF final round	Costa Rica	1–1	El Salvador	San Pedro Sula, Honduras
17:00 (UTC−6)	Centeno 55'	Report	40' Galdámez	Stadium: Estadio Olímpico Metropolitano; Referee: Germán Arredondo (Mexico)

16 June 2002 FIFA WCQ	Mexico	1–2	Costa Rica	Mexico City, Mexico
12:00 (UTC−5)	Abundis 7'	Report	72' Fonseca; 86' Medford	Stadium: Estadio Azteca; Attendance: 60,000; Referee: Carlos Batres (Guatemala)

20 June 2002 FIFA WCQ	Costa Rica	2–1	Jamaica	Alajuela, Costa Rica
20:00 (UTC−6)	Marín 4'; Wanchope 38'	Report	10' Lowe	Stadium: Estadio Alejandro Morera Soto; Attendance: 17,800; Referee: John Toro (Colombia)

1 July 2002 FIFA WCQ	Honduras	2–3	Costa Rica	Tegucigalpa, Honduras
16:00 (UTC−6)	Guevara 25', 38'	Report	9' Wanchope; 13' Fonseca; 83' Solís	Stadium: Estadio Nacional; Attendance: 38,000; Referee: Óscar Ruiz (Colombia)

13 July Copa América GS	Honduras	0–1	Costa Rica	Medellín, Colombia
20:15 (UTC−5)		Report	63' Wanchope	Stadium: Estadio Atanasio Girardot; Referee: Mario Sánchez (Chile)

16 July Copa América GS	Uruguay	1–1	Costa Rica	Medellín, Colombia
18:00 (UTC−5)	C. Morales 53'	Report	28' Wanchope	Stadium: Estadio Atanasio Girardot; Referee: Carlos Simon (Brazil)

19 July Copa América GS	Bolivia	0–4	Costa Rica	Medellín, Colombia
18:00 (UTC−5)		Report	45', 71' Wanchope; 63' Bryce; 71' Fonseca	Stadium: Estadio Atanasio Girardot; Referee: Luis Solórzano (Venezuela)

22 July Copa América QF	Uruguay	2–1	Costa Rica	Armenia, Colombia
17:30 (UTC−5)	Lemos 61' (pen.); Lima 87'	Report	52' Wanchope	Stadium: Estadio Centenario; Attendance: 29,000; Referee: Óscar Ruiz (Colombia)

1 September 2002 FIFA WCQ	Trinidad and Tobago	0–2	Costa Rica	Port of Spain, Trinidad and Tobago
16:00 (UTC−4)		Report	4', 35' Gómez	Stadium: Hasely Crawford Stadium; Attendance: 2,500; Referee: Mohammed Kousa (Syria)

5 September 2002 FIFA WCQ	Costa Rica	2–0	United States	San Juan de Tibás, Costa Rica
20:00 (UTC−6)	Fonseca 39' (pen.), 68'	Report		Stadium: Estadio Ricardo Saprissa Aymá; Attendance: 24,000; Referee: Carlos Batres (Guatemala)

7 October 2002 FIFA WCQ	Costa Rica	0–0	Mexico	San Juan de Tibás, Costa Rica
12:00 (UTC−6)		Report		Stadium: Estadio Ricardo Saprissa Aymá; Attendance: 24,000; Referee: Antônio Pereira (Brazil)

11 November 2002 FIFA WCQ	Jamaica	0–1	Costa Rica	Kingston, Jamaica
15:00 (UTC−5)		Report	5' Sunsing	Stadium: Independence Park; Attendance: 7,000; Referee: Ramesh Ramdhan (Trinidad and Tobago)

=== 2002 ===
18 January Gold Cup GS	Martinique	0–2	Costa Rica	Miami, United States
		Report	38' Medford; 55' Fonseca	Stadium: Miami Orange Bowl; Attendance: 14,508; Referee: Gilberto Alcalá (Mexico)

20 January Gold Cup GS	Costa Rica	1–1	Trinidad and Tobago	Miami, United States
	Fonseca 56'	Report	90' John	Stadium: Miami Orange Bowl; Attendance: 12,253; Referee: Brian Hall (United States)

26 January Gold Cup QF	Costa Rica	2–1 (a.e.t.)	Haiti	Miami, United States
	Centeno 2'; Gómez 97'	Report	62' Pierre	Stadium: Miami Orange Bowl; Attendance: 14,823; Referee: Gilberto Alcalá (Mexico)

30 January Gold Cup SF	Costa Rica	3–1	South Korea	Pasadena, United States
	Gómez 44'; Wanchope 77', 82'	Report	81' Choi	Stadium: Rose Bowl; Attendance: 7,241; Referee: Rodolfo Sibrian (El Salvador)

2 February Gold Cup Final	United States	2–0	Costa Rica	Pasadena, United States
	Wolff 37'; Agoos 63'	Report		Stadium: Rose Bowl; Attendance: 14,432; Referee: Carlos Batres (Guatemala)

27 March Friendly	Costa Rica	0–1	Morocco	San Juan de Tibás, Costa Rica
20:00 (UTC−6)		Report	52' Bouden	Stadium: Estadio Ricardo Saprissa Aymá; Referee: Luis Rodríguez (Costa Rica)

17 April Friendly	Japan	1–1	Costa Rica	Yokohama, Japan
	Myojin 69'	Report	76' Parks	Stadium: International Stadium Yokohama; Attendance: 64,783; Referee: Huang Junjie (China)

20 April Friendly	South Korea	2–0	Costa Rica	Daegu, South Korea
	Cha 25'; Choi 83'	Report		Stadium: Daegu Stadium; Attendance: 35,000; Referee: Toshimitsu Yoshida (Japan)

9 May Friendly	Costa Rica	1–2	Colombia	San Juan de Tibás, Costa Rica
20:00 (UTC−6)	Centeno 53' (pen.)	Report	39' (pen.), 42' Castillo	Stadium: Estadio Ricardo Saprissa Aymá; Referee: Clareth Jiménez (Costa Rica)

26 May Friendly	Belgium	1–0	Costa Rica	Kumamoto, Japan
14:00 (UTC+9)	Goor 23'	Report		Stadium: Kumamoto Athletics Stadium; Referee: Yasuhiro Matsuzaki (Japan)

4 June World Cup GS	China	0–2	Costa Rica	Gwangju, South Korea
15:30 (UTC+9)		Report	61' Gómez; 65' Wright	Stadium: Gwangju World Cup Stadium; Attendance: 27,217; Referee: Kyros Vassaras (Greece)

9 June World Cup GS	Costa Rica	1–1	Turkey	Incheon, South Korea
18:00 (UTC+9)	Parks 86'	Report	56' Belözoğlu	Stadium: Incheon Munhak Stadium; Attendance: 42,299; Referee: Coffi Codjia (Benin)

13 June World Cup GS	Costa Rica	2–5	Brazil	Suwon, South Korea
15:30 (UTC+9)	Wanchope 39'; Gómez 56'	Report	10', 13' Ronaldo; 38' Edmílson; 62' Rivaldo; 64' Júnior	Stadium: Suwon World Cup Stadium; Attendance: 38,524; Referee: Gamal Al-Ghandour (Egypt)

16 October Friendly	Costa Rica	1–1	Ecuador	San Juan de Tibás, Costa Rica
20:40 (UTC−6)	Bryce 53'	Report	82' C. Tenorio	Stadium: Estadio Ricardo Saprissa Aymá; Referee: Rodrigo Badilla (Costa Rica)

20 November Friendly	Ecuador	2–2	Costa Rica	Quito, Ecuador
	Aguinaga 75' (pen.); Kaviedes 85'	Report	29' Chinchilla; 45' Herron	Stadium: Estadio Olímpico Atahualpa; Referee: Pedro Ramos (Ecuador)

=== 2003 ===
11 February UNCAF Nations Cup	El Salvador	0–1	Costa Rica	Panama City, Panama
21:00 (UTC−5)		Report	60' Scott	Stadium: Estadio Rommel Fernández; Referee: Carlos Batres (Guatemala)

13 February UNCAF Nations Cup	Costa Rica	1–1	Guatemala	Panama City, Panama
21:00 (UTC−5)	Centeno 24' (pen.)	Report	48' García	Stadium: Estadio Rommel Fernández; Referee: Felipe Ramos (Mexico)

15 February UNCAF Nations Cup	Costa Rica	1–0	Nicaragua	Panama City, Panama
15:00 (UTC−5)	Scott 16'	Report		Stadium: Estadio Rommel Fernández; Referee: Joel Aguilar (El Salvador)

20 February UNCAF Nations Cup	Costa Rica	1–0	Honduras	Panama City, Panama
21:00 (UTC−5)	Bryce 45+2'	Report		Stadium: Estadio Rommel Fernández; Referee: Carlos Batres (Guatemala)

23 February UNCAF Nations Cup	Panama	0–1	Costa Rica	Panama City, Panama
17:00 (UTC−5)		Report	73' Solís	Stadium: Estadio Rommel Fernández; Referee: Carlos Batres (Guatemala)

29 March Friendly	Costa Rica	2–1	Paraguay	Alajuela, Costa Rica
20:00 (UTC−6)	Parks 35'; Bennett 89'	Report	51' Cáceres	Stadium: Estadio Alejandro Morera Soto; Referee: Wálter Quesada (Costa Rica)

30 April Friendly	Chile	1–0	Costa Rica	Santiago, Chile
20:00 (UTC−4)	Contreras 60'	Report		Stadium: Estadio Nacional Julio Martínez Prádanos; Attendance: 10,000; Referee: Ubaldo Aquino (Paraguay)

8 June Friendly	Costa Rica	1–0	Chile	San Juan de Tibás, Costa Rica
11:00 (UTC−6)	Fonseca 87'	Report		Stadium: Estadio Ricardo Saprissa Aymá; Referee: Benigno Pineda (Honduras)

11 July Gold Cup GS	Canada	1–0	Costa Rica	Foxborough, United States
13:00 (UTC−4)	Stalteri 59'	Report		Stadium: Gillette Stadium; Attendance: 33,652; Referee: Richard Piper (Trinidad and Tobago)

15 July Gold Cup GS	Costa Rica	3–0	Cuba	Foxborough, United States
16:30 (UTC−4)	Centeno 45'; Bryce 72'; Scott 77'	Report		Stadium: Gillette Stadium; Attendance: 10,361; Referee: Benito Archundia (Mexico)

19 July Gold Cup QF	Costa Rica	5–2	El Salvador	Foxborough, United States
18:00 (UTC−4)	Scott 11'; Centeno 47', 68' (pen.), 90+3' (pen.); Bryce 72'	Report	34' (pen.) Murgas; 54' Pacheco	Stadium: Gillette Stadium; Attendance: 15,627; Referee: Felipe Ramos (Mexico)

24 July Gold Cup SF	Mexico	2–0	Costa Rica	Mexico City, Mexico
21:00 (UTC−5)	Márquez 19'; Borgetti 28'	Report		Stadium: Estadio Azteca; Attendance: 35,000; Referee: Nery Alfado (El Salvador)

26 July Gold Cup 3rd place	United States	3–2	Costa Rica	Miami, United States
20:00 (UTC−4)	Bocanegra 29'; Stewart 56'; Convey 67'	Report	24', 39' Fonseca	Stadium: Miami Orange Bowl; Attendance: 5,039; Referee: Richard Piper (Trinidad and Tobago)

20 August Friendly	Austria	2–0	Costa Rica	Vienna, Austria
20:30 (UTC+2)	Glieder 34' (pen.); Roman Wallner 70'	Report		Stadium: Ernst-Happel-Stadion; Referee: Alain Hamer (Luxembourg)

7 September Friendly	Costa Rica	2–0	China	Fort Lauderdale, United States
18:45 (UTC−4)	Saborío 13'; Bryce 25'	Report		Stadium: Lockhart Stadium; Referee: Kevin Stott (United States)

11 October Friendly	South Africa	2–1	Costa Rica	Potchefstroom, South Africa
16:00 (UTC+2)	Nomvethe 74'; Mayo 86'	Report	78' (o.g.) Mokoena	Stadium: Olën Park; Referee: Tendai Bwanya (Zimbabwe)

19 November Friendly	Costa Rica	2–1	Finland	Alajuela, Costa Rica
20:00 (UTC−6)	Marín 15'; Saborío 72'	Report	62' (pen.) Nurmela	Stadium: Estadio Alejandro Morera Soto; Referee: Carlos Batres (Guatemala)

=== 2004 ===
31 March Friendly	Mexico	2–0	Costa Rica	Carson, United States
	García 12'; D. Martínez 40'	Report		Stadium: Home Depot Center

12 June 2006 FIFA WCQ	Cuba	2–2	Costa Rica	Havana, Cuba
16:30 (UTC−5)	Moré 24', 75'	Report	12' Douglas Sequeira; 42'	Stadium: Estadio Pedro Marrero; Attendance: 18,500; Referee: Benito Archundia (Mexico)

20 June 2006 FIFA WCQ	Costa Rica	1–1	Cuba	Alajuela, Costa Rica
11:00 (UTC−6)	Gómez 31'	Report	45+1' Cervantes	Stadium: Estadio Alejandro Morera Soto; Attendance: 12,000; Referee: Peter Prendergast (Jamaica)

8 July Copa América GS	Costa Rica	0–1	Paraguay	Arequipa, Peru
17:30 (UTC−5)		Report	85' (pen.) dos Santos	Stadium: Estadio Monumental Virgen de Chapi; Attendance: 30,000; Referee: Óscar Ruiz (Colombia)

11 July Copa América GS	Brazil	4–1	Costa Rica	Arequipa, Peru
15:00 (UTC−5)	Adriano 45', 54', 67'; Juan 49'	Report	81' Marín	Stadium: Estadio Monumental Virgen de Chapi; Referee: Héctor Baldassi (Argentina)

14 July Copa América GS	Costa Rica	2–1	Chile	Tacna, Peru
17:30 (UTC−5)	Wright 59'; Herron 90+3'	Report	40' Olarra	Stadium: Estadio Jorge Basadre; Referee: René Ortubé (Bolivia)

17 July Copa América QF	Colombia	2–0	Costa Rica	Chiclayo, Peru
19:45 (UTC−5)	Aguilar 41'; Moreno 45+1' (pen.)	Report		Stadium: Estadio Elías Aguirre; Referee: Carlos Amarilla (Paraguay)

18 August 2006 FIFA WCQ	Costa Rica	2–5	Honduras	Alajuela, Costa Rica
20:00 (UTC−6)	Herron 20', 36'	Report	22' Suazo; 35' de León; 77' Guevara; 87' Guerrero; 89' S. Martínez	Stadium: Estadio Alejandro Morera Soto; Attendance: 14,000; Referee: Marco Rodríguez (Mexico)

5 September 2006 FIFA WCQ	Guatemala	2–1	Costa Rica	Guatemala City, Guatemala
12:00 (UTC−6)	Plata 58', 73'	Report	24' Solís	Stadium: Estadio Mateo Flores; Attendance: 27,460; Referee: Kevin Stott (United States)

8 September 2006 FIFA WCQ	Costa Rica	1–0	Canada	San Juan de Tibás, Costa Rica
20:00 (UTC−6)	Wanchope 46'	Report		Stadium: Estadio Ricardo Saprissa Aymá; Attendance: 13,000; Referee: Ramesh Ramdhan (Trinidad and Tobago)

9 October 2006 FIFA WCQ	Costa Rica	5–0	Guatemala	San Juan de Tibás, Costa Rica
19:30 (UTC−6)	C. Hernández 19'; Wanchope 36', 62', 69'; R. Fonseca 83'	Report		Stadium: Estadio Ricardo Saprissa Aymá; Attendance: 18,000; Referee: Benito Archundia (Mexico)

13 October 2006 FIFA WCQ	Canada	1–3	Costa Rica	Burnaby, Canada
19:00 (UTC−8)	De Rosario 12'	Report	49' Wanchope; 81' Sunsing; 87' Hernández	Stadium: Swangard Stadium; Attendance: 4,000; Referee: Peter Prendergast (Jamaica)

17 November 2006 FIFA WCQ	Honduras	0–0	Costa Rica	San Pedro Sula, Honduras
17:00 (UTC−6)		Report		Stadium: Estadio Francisco Morazán; Attendance: 18,000; Referee: Rodolfo Sibrian (El Salvador)

=== 2005 ===
12 January Friendly	Costa Rica	3–3	Haiti	San Juan de Tibás, Costa Rica
20:00 (UTC−6)	Centeno 2'; Scott 10'; Herron 13' (pen.)	Report	18', 39' Cadet; 90+2' Germain	Stadium: Estadio Ricardo Saprissa Aymá; Referee: Greivin Porras (Costa Rica)

9 February 2006 FIFA WCQ	Costa Rica	1–2	Mexico	San Juan de Tibás, Costa Rica
20:00 (UTC−6)	Wanchope 38'	Report	8', 10' Lozano	Stadium: Estadio Ricardo Saprissa Aymá; Attendance: 22,000; Referee: Carlos Batres (Guatemala)

16 February Friendly	Costa Rica	1–2	Ecuador	Heredia, Costa Rica
20:00 (UTC−6)	Alfaro 46'	Report	60' (pen.) M. Ayoví; 86' Guagua	Stadium: Estadio Eladio Rosabal Cordero; Referee: Édgar Durán (Costa Rica)

21 February UNCAF GS	Costa Rica	2–1	El Salvador	Ciudad de Guatemala, Guatemala
	Wilson 70'; Myrie 90+2'	Report	40' Alas	Stadium: Estadio Mateo Flores; Attendance: Less than 1,000; Referee: Carlos Batres (Guatemala)

23 February UNCAF GS	Costa Rica	1–0	Panama	Ciudad de Guatemala, Guatemala
	Myrie 81'	Report		Stadium: Estadio Mateo Flores; Referee: Benito Archundia (Mexico)

25 February UNCAF SF	Guatemala	0–4	Costa Rica	Ciudad de Guatemala, Guatemala
20:00 (UTC−6)		Report	8' Segura; 21' Sequeira; 40' Wilson; 60' Scott	Stadium: Estadio Mateo Flores; Referee: Benito Archundia (Mexico)

27 February UNCAF Final	Costa Rica	1–1 (7–6 p)	Honduras	Ciudad de Guatemala, Guatemala
16:00 (UTC−6)	Wilson 67'	Report	57' Núñez	Stadium: Estadio Mateo Flores; Referee: Carlos Batres (Guatemala)
	Penalties
	Soto (penalty missed); Alfaro (penalty scored); Wilson (penalty scored); Cubero (penalty scored); Sequeira (penalty scored); Fonseca (penalty scored); Díaz (penalty scored); Umaña (penalty scored)		(penalty scored) Velásquez; (penalty scored) López; (penalty scored) Mendoza; (penalty missed) Berríos; (penalty scored) Núñez; (penalty scored) Guerrero; (penalty scored) Reyes; (penalty missed) Vallecillo

26 March 2006 FIFA WCQ	Costa Rica	2–1	Panama	San Juan de Tibás, Costa Rica
18:00 (UTC−6)	Wilson 40' (pen.); Myrie 90+1'	Report	58' (pen.) Brown	Stadium: Estadio Ricardo Saprissa Aymá; Attendance: 8,000; Referee: Marco Antonio Rodríguez (Mexico)

30 March 2006 FIFA WCQ	Trinidad and Tobago	0–0	Costa Rica	Port of Spain, Trinidad and Tobago
16:30 (UTC−4)		Report		Stadium: Hasely Crawford Stadium; Attendance: 8,000; Referee: Mauricio Navarro (Canada)

24 May Friendly	Norway	1–0	Costa Rica	Oslo, Norway
19:30 (UTC+2)	F. Johnsen 77'	Report		Stadium: Ullevaal Stadion; Attendance: 21,251; Referee: Dick van Egmond (Netherlands)

4 June 2006 FIFA WCQ	United States	3–0	Costa Rica	Salt Lake City, United States
17:30 (UTC−7)	Donovan 10', 62'; McBride 87'	Report		Stadium: Rice-Eccles Stadium; Attendance: 40,576; Referee: Carlos Batres (Guatemala)

8 June 2006 FIFA WCQ	Costa Rica	3–2	Guatemala	San Juan de Tibás, Costa Rica
20:00 (UTC−6)	C. Hernández 34'; Ró. Gómez 65'; Wanchope 90+2'	Report	74' Villatoro; 77' Rodríguez	Stadium: Estadio Ricardo Saprissa Aymá; Attendance: 10,500; Referee: Benito Archundia (Mexico)

19 June Friendly	China	2–2	Costa Rica	Changsha, China
19:30 (UTC+8)	Yaokun 27'; Xiang 79'	Report	57' Solís; 75' Gómez	Stadium: Helong Sports Center Stadium; Referee: Lee Gi-young (South Korea)

22 June Friendly	China	2–0	Costa Rica	Guangzhou, China
19:30 (UTC+8)	Zhi 44' (pen.); Hui 54'	Report		Stadium: Tianhe Stadium; Referee: Yu Byung-seob (South Korea)

7 July Gold Cup GS	Canada	0–1	Costa Rica	Seattle, United States
		Report	30' (pen.) Soto	Stadium: Qwest Field; Attendance: 15,831; Referee: Peter Prendergast (Jamaica)

9 July Gold Cup GS	Costa Rica	3–1	Cuba	Seattle, United States
	Brenes 61', 85' (pen.); Soto 81' (pen.)	Report	72' Galindo	Stadium: Qwest Field; Attendance: 15,109; Referee: Benito Archundia (Mexico)

11 July Gold Cup GS	United States	0–0	Costa Rica	Foxborough, United States
		Report		Stadium: Gillette Stadium; Attendance: 15,211; Referee: Benito Archundia (Mexico)

16 July Gold Cup QF	Honduras	3–2	Costa Rica	Foxborough, United States
	Velásquez 6'; Turcios 27'; Núñez 30'	Report	40' Bolaños; 81' Ruiz	Stadium: Gillette Stadium; Attendance: 22,108; Referee: Benito Archundia (Mexico)

17 August 2006 FIFA WCQ	Mexico	2–0	Costa Rica	Mexico City, Mexico
21:00 (UTC−6)	63' Borgetti; 86' J. Fonseca	Report		Stadium: Estadio Azteca; Attendance: 27,000; Referee: José Piñeda (Honduras)

3 September 2006 FIFA WCQ	Panama	1–3	Costa Rica	Panama City, Panama
20:00 (UTC−5)	Tejada 90'	Report	44' Saborío; 51' Centeno; 73' R. Gómez	Stadium: Estadio Rommel Fernández; Attendance: 21,000; Referee: Kevin Stott (United States)

7 September 2006 FIFA WCQ	Costa Rica	2–0	Trinidad and Tobago	San Juan de Tibás, Costa Rica
20:00 (UTC−6)	Saborío 15'; Centeno 50'	Report		Stadium: Estadio Ricardo Saprissa Aymá; Attendance: 17,000; Referee: Carlos Batres (Guatemala)

8 October 2006 FIFA WCQ	Costa Rica	3–0	United States	San Juan de Tibás, Costa Rica
19:00 (UTC−6)	Wanchope 34'; Hernández 60', 88'	Report		Stadium: Estadio Ricardo Saprissa Aymá; Attendance: 18,000; Referee: Benito Archundia (Mexico)

12 October 2006 FIFA WCQ	Guatemala	3–1	Costa Rica	Ciudad de Guatemala, Guatemala
18:00 (UTC−6)	É. Ponciano 2'; García 16'; Ruiz 30'	Report	60' Myrie	Stadium: Estadio Mateo Flores; Attendance: 23,912; Referee: Brian Hall (United States)

9 November Friendly	France	3–2	Costa Rica	Fort-de-France, Martinique
16:00 (UTC−4)	Anelka 48'; Cissé 79'; Henry 86'	Report	13' Saborío; 40' Fonseca	Stadium: Stade Pierre-Aliker; Attendance: 16,216; Referee: Gilberto Alcalá (Mexico)

=== 2006 ===
11 February Friendly	South Korea	0–1	Costa Rica	Oakland, United States
15:00 (UTC−7)		Report	40' (pen.) Saborío	Stadium: McAfee Coliseum; Referee: Terry Vaughn (United States)

1 March Friendly	Iran	3–2	Costa Rica	Tehran, Iran
16:00 (UTC+3:30)	Karimi 9'; Daei 15'; Hashemian 33'	Report	43' Hernández; 59' Fonseca	Stadium: Azadi Stadium; Attendance: 30,000; Referee: Fareed Al-Marzouqi (United Arab Emirates)

28 May Friendly	Ukraine	4–0	Costa Rica	Kyiv, Ukraine
17:00 (UTC+3)	Nazarenko 18'; Vorobey 33'; Kalynychenko 38'; Byelik 56'	Report		Stadium: Olympic Stadium; Attendance: 29,000; Referee: Nikolai Ivanov

30 May Friendly	Czech Republic	1–0	Costa Rica	Jablonec, Czech Republic
18:00 (UTC+2)	Lokvenc 82'	Report		Stadium: Stadion Střelnice; Attendance: 6,244; Referee: Ferenc Bede (Hungary)

9 June World Cup GS	Germany	4–2	Costa Rica	Munich, Germany
18:00 (UTC+2)	Lahm 6'; Klose 17', 61'; Frings 87'	Report	12', 73' Wanchope	Stadium: FIFA WM-Stadion München; Attendance: 66,000; Referee: Horacio Elizondo (Argentina)

15 June World Cup GS	Ecuador	3–0	Costa Rica	Hamburg, Germany
15:00 (UTC+2)	C. Tenorio 8'; Delgado 54'; Kaviedes 90+2'	Report		Stadium: FIFA WM Stadion Hamburg; Attendance: 50,000; Referee: Coffi Codjia (Benin)

20 June World Cup GS	Costa Rica	1–2	Poland	Hanover, Germany
16:00 (UTC+2)	Gómez 25'	Report	33', 65' Bosacki	Stadium: FIFA WM Stadion Hanover; Attendance: 43,000; Referee: Shamsul Maidin (Singapore)

1 September Friendly	Austria	2–2	Costa Rica	Geneva, Switzerland
	Linz 35' (pen.), 59'	Report	16' (pen.), 40' Saborío	Stadium: Stade de Genève; Referee: Claudio Circhetta (Switzerland)

5 September Friendly	Switzerland	2–0	Costa Rica	Geneva, Switzerland
20:15 (UTC+2)	Streller 12'; Frei 39'	Report		Stadium: Stade de Genève; Attendance: 12,000; Referee: Dick van Egmond (Netherlands)

- Costa Rica played the non-FIFA Catalonia team on 24 May 2006; this did not contribute to ranking points or individual cap totals.

=== 2007 ===
4 February Friendly	Costa Rica	4–0	Trinidad and Tobago	Alajuela, Costa Rica
17:00 (UTC−6)	Wallace 29'; Solís 43', 51'; Fonseca 56'	Report		Stadium: Estadio Alejandro Morera Soto; Referee: Greivin Porras and Ricardo Cerdas (Costa Rica)

9 February UNCAF GS	Costa Rica	3–1	Honduras	San Salvador, El Salvador
19:30 (UTC−6)	Fonseca 4', 70'; González 46'	Report	58' E. Martínez	Stadium: Estadio Cuscatlán; Referee: Benito Archundia (Mexico)

13 February UNCAF GS	Panama	1–0	Costa Rica	San Salvador, El Salvador
19:30 (UTC−6)	Blanco 42'	Report		Stadium: Estadio Cuscatlán; Referee: Carlos Batres (Guatemala)

16 February UNCAF SF	El Salvador	0–2	Costa Rica	San Salvador, El Salvador
20:00 (UTC−6)		Report	10' Wallace; 11' Fonseca	Stadium: Estadio Cuscatlán; Referee: Benito Archundia (Mexico)

18 February UNCAF Final	Panama	1–1 (1–4 p)	Costa Rica	San Salvador, El Salvador
17:00 (UTC−6)	Tejada 35'	Report	80' Bernard	Stadium: Estadio Cuscatlán; Referee: Carlos Batres (Guatemala)
	Penalties
	Baloy (penalty missed); Herrera (penalty missed); Escobar (penalty scored)		(penalty scored) Centeno; (penalty scored) Fonseca; (penalty scored) Hernández; (penalty scored) Barrantes

24 March Friendly	Costa Rica	4–0	New Zealand	San Juan de Tibás, Costa Rica
20:00 (UTC−6)	Saborío 7', 80' (pen.); Solís 18'; Ruiz 57'	Report		Stadium: Estadio Ricardo Saprissa Aymá; Referee: Édgar Rodríguez (Costa Rica)

28 March Friendly	Chile	1–1	Costa Rica	Talca, Chile
22:00 (UTC−4)	Navia 3'	Report	60' Fonseca	Stadium: Estadio Fiscal de Talca; Referee: René Oturbé (Bolivia)

2 June Friendly	Costa Rica	2–0	Chile	San Juan de Tibás, Costa Rica
19:00 (UTC−6)	Badilla 28'; Ruiz 58'	Report		Stadium: Estadio Ricardo Saprissa Aymá; Referee: Manuel Glower (Mexico)

=== 2008 ===
30 January Friendly	Iran	0–0	Costa Rica	Tehran, Iran
15:00 (UTC+3:30)				Stadium: Azadi Stadium; Referee: Fareed Al-Marzouqi (United Arab Emirates)

7 February Friendly	Jamaica	1–1	Costa Rica	Kingston, Jamaica
18:00 (UTC−5)	Marshall 90'		Núñez 79'	Stadium: National Stadium; Referee: Neal Brizan (Trinidad and Tobago)

6 September 2010 FIFA WCQ	Costa Rica	7–0	Suriname	San José, Costa Rica
20:00 (UTC−6)	Ledezma 9', 41'; Alpízar 47'; Alonso 78'; Borges 79'; Solís 86'; Ruiz 88'			Stadium: Estadio Ricardo Saprissa; Attendance: 11,000; Referee: Steven Depiero (Canada)

11 October 2010 FIFA WCQ	Suriname	1–4	Costa Rica	Paramaribo, Suriname
16:30 (UTC−3)	Sandvliet 48'		Centeno 10'; Borges 41'; Alonso 47'; Solís 78'	Stadium: André Kamperveen Stadion; Attendance: 3,000; Referee: Courtney Campbell (Jamaica)

=== 2009 ===
23 January UNCAF GS	Costa Rica	3–0	Panama	Tegucigalpa, Honduras
19:30 (UTC−6)	Furtado 10', 16'; Sánchez 55'			Stadium: Estadio Nacional; Attendance: 2,000; Referee: Courtney Campbell (Jamaica)

25 January UNCAF GS	Guatemala	1–3	Costa Rica	Tegucigalpa, Honduras
18:00 (UTC−6)	López 51'		34' Sánchez; 59' Herrera; 60' Segura	Stadium: Estadio Nacional; Attendance: 3,000; Referee: Marco Rodríguez (Mexico)

30 January UNCAF SF	Costa Rica	3–0; Awarded	El Salvador	Tegucigalpa, Honduras
20:00 (UTC−6)	Furtado 18'			Stadium: Estadio Nacional; Attendance: 2,500; Referee: Roberto Moreno (Panama)

1 February UNCAF Final	Panama	0–0 (5–3 p)	Costa Rica	Tegucigalpa, Honduras
18:00 (UTC−6)				Stadium: Estadio Nacional; Attendance: 900; Referee: Carlos Batres (Guatemala)
	Penalties
	Herrera (penalty scored); Aguilar (penalty scored); Phillips (penalty scored); Jaramillo (penalty scored); Henríquez (penalty scored)		(penalty scored) Furtado; (penalty scored) Núñez; (penalty missed) Jiménez; (penalty scored) Oviedo

11 February 2010 FIFA WCQ	Costa Rica	2–0	Honduras	San Juan de Tibás, Costa Rica
20:30 (UTC−6)	Furtado 48', 59'	Report		Stadium: Estadio Ricardo Saprissa Aymá; Attendance: 18,000; Referee: Joel Aguilar (El Salvador)

28 March 2010 FIFA WCQ	Mexico	2–0	Costa Rica	Mexico City, Mexico
17:00 (UTC−6)	Bravo 20'; Pardo 53' (pen.)	Report		Stadium: Estadio Azteca; Attendance: 90,000; Referee: Terry Vaughn (United States)

1 April 2010 FIFA WCQ	Costa Rica	1–0	El Salvador	San Juan de Tibás, Costa Rica
20:00 (UTC−6)	Centeno 69'	Report		Stadium: Estadio Ricardo Saprissa Aymá; Attendance: 19,200; Referee: Jair Marrufo (United States)

13 May Friendly	Venezuela	1–1	Costa Rica	San Cristóbal, Venezuela
20:00 (UTC−4:30)	Velázquez 24'	Report	28' W. Granados	Stadium: Estadio Polideportivo de Pueblo Nuevo; Referee: Marlon Escalante (Venezuela)

3 June 2010 FIFA WCQ	Costa Rica	3–1	United States	San Juan de Tibás, Costa Rica
20:00 (UTC−6)	Saborío 2'; Borges 13'; Herrera; 68'	Report	90+2' (pen.) Donovan	Stadium: Estadio Ricardo Saprissa Aymá; Attendance: 19,200; Referee: Neal Brizan (Trinidad and Tobago)

6 June 2010 FIFA WCQ	Trinidad and Tobago	2–3	Costa Rica	Scarborough, Trinidad and Tobago
18:05 (UTC−4)	Edwards 29'; Samuel 63'	Report	40' Saborío; 52', 68' Borges	Stadium: Dwight Yorke Stadium; Attendance: 8,000; Referee: Courtney Campbell (Jamaica)

26 June Friendly	Costa Rica	1–0	Venezuela	San Juan de Tibás, Costa Rica
	Saborío 38'	Report		Stadium: Estadio Ricardo Saprissa Aymá; Referee: Ricardo Zelaya (Honduras)

3 July Gold Cup GS	Costa Rica	1–2	El Salvador	Carson, United States
19:00 (UTC−7)	Granados 64'	Report	19', 87' Romero	Stadium: Home Depot Center; Attendance: 27,000; Referee: Benito Archundia (Mexico)

7 July Gold Cup GS	Jamaica	0–1	Costa Rica	Columbus, United States
19:00 (UTC−4)		Report	62' Borges	Stadium: Columbus Crew Stadium; Attendance: 7,059; Referee: Jair Marrufo (United States)

10 July Gold Cup GS	Costa Rica	2–2	Canada	Miami, United States
19:00 (UTC−4)	Herron 23'; Centeno 35'	Report	25' Bernier; 28' de Jong	Stadium: FIU Stadium; Attendance: 17,269; Referee: Terry Vaughn (United States)

19 July Gold Cup QF	Guadeloupe	1–5	Costa Rica	Arlington, United States
15:00 (UTC−5)	Alphonse 64'	Report	3' Borges; 16', 71' Saborío; 47' Herron; 89' Herrera	Stadium: Cowboys Stadium; Attendance: 85,000; Referee: José Pineda (Honduras)

23 July Gold Cup SF	Costa Rica	1–1 (3–5 p)	Mexico	Chicago, United States
22:00 (UTC−5)	Ledezma 90+3'	Report	88' Franco	Stadium: Soldier Field; Attendance: 55,173; Referee: Roberto Moreno (Panama)
	Penalties
	Saborío (penalty scored); Borges (penalty scored); Ledezma (penalty missed); Oviedo (penalty scored)		(penalty scored) Franco; (penalty scored) dos Santos; (penalty scored) Torrado; (penalty scored) Juárez; (penalty scored) Vela

12 August 2010 FIFA WCQ	Honduras	4–0	Costa Rica	San Pedro Sula, Honduras
19:30 (UTC−6)	Costly 30', 90+2'; Pavón 51'; M. Valladares 89'	Report		Stadium: Estadio Olímpico Metropolitano; Attendance: 30,000; Referee: Marco Rodríguez (Mexico)

5 September 2010 FIFA WCQ	Costa Rica	0–3	Mexico	San Juan de Tibás, Costa Rica
20:00 (UTC−6)		Report	45+1' dos Santos; 62' Franco; 71' Guardado	Stadium: Estadio Ricardo Saprissa Aymá; Attendance: 20,000; Referee: Neal Brizan (Trinidad and Tobago)

9 September 2010 FIFA WCQ	El Salvador	1–0	Costa Rica	San Salvador, El Salvador
19:00 (UTC−6)	Corrales 90+1'	Report		Stadium: Estadio Cuscatlán; Attendance: 18,000; Referee: Benito Archundia (Mexico)

10 October 2010 FIFA WCQ	Costa Rica	4–0	Trinidad and Tobago	San Juan de Tibás, Costa Rica
20:00 (UTC−6)	James 26' (o.g.); Centeno 51'; Saborío 61', 64'	Report		Stadium: Estadio Ricardo Saprissa Aymá; Attendance: 10,000; Referee: Jair Marrufo (United States)

14 October 2010 FIFA WCQ	United States	2–2	Costa Rica	Washington, D.C., United States
20:05 (UTC−4)	Michael Bradley 71'; Bornstein 90+4'	Report	20', 23' Ruiz	Stadium: Robert F. Kennedy Memorial Stadium; Attendance: 26,243; Referee: Benito Archundia (Mexico)

14 November 2010 FIFA WCQ	Costa Rica	0–1	Uruguay	San Juan de Tibás, Costa Rica
20:00 (UTC−6)		Report	21' Lugano	Stadium: Estadio Ricardo Saprissa Aymá; Attendance: 19,500; Referee: Alberto Undiano Mallenco (Spain)

18 November 2010 FIFA WCQ	Uruguay	1–1	Costa Rica	Montevideo, Uruguay
21:00 (UTC−2)	Abreu 70'	Report	74' Centeno	Stadium: Estadio Centenario; Attendance: 55,000; Referee: Massimo Busacca (Switzerland)

== See also ==
- Costa Rica at the Copa América
