= 2017–18 Liga FPD – Clausura season =

Liga FPD
- Promotional image for the tournament
- Season: 2017–18
- Matches played: 12
- Goals scored: 26 (2.17 per match)
- Top goalscorer: 26 players (1 goal)
- Biggest away win: A.D. Municipal Liberia 0–3 Saprissa (7 January)

The 2018 Apertura season served as the opening half of the 2017–18 Liga FPD season. It began on 6 January 2018 and, given the possibility of a final, will end on 20 May 2018.

Pérez Zeledón are the defending champions.

== Personnel and kits ==
Team	Chairman	Manager	Captain	Kit manufacturer	Shirt sponsor
Alajuelense	Fernando Ocampo	(Uruguay) Nicolás dos Santos	(Costa Rica) José Salvatierra	Kelme	Claro, Toyota, Mobil
Carmelita	Isidro Zamora	(Costa Rica) Mario Víquez	(Costa Rica) Carlos Acosta	Sportek	Great Wall Motors, Universidad Santa Lucía
Cartaginés	Luis Vargas	(Costa Rica) Adrián Leandro	(Costa Rica) Danny Fonseca	Joma	Meco, Premium, Toyota
Grecia	Dagoberto Matamoros	(Costa Rica) Walter Centeno	(Costa Rica) Daniel Vallejos	ProSport	ROES, Super Rosvil
Guadalupe	Vacant	(Mexico) Antonio Abasolo	To be determined	Pirma	Dream Travels, Papa John's
Herediano	David Patey	Jafet Soto	(Costa Rica) Óscar Granados	Umbro	Kölbi, San Miguel, Toyota
Liberia	Julio Salas	(Uruguay) Víctor Abelenda	(Costa Rica) Rafael Núñez	Prosport	Pulmitan, Condovac, Toyota, Philips, Papa John's
Limón	Noel Ferguson	(Costa Rica) Horacio Esquivel	(Costa Rica) Kareem McLean	Sportek	Reina's
Pérez Zeledón	Juan Artavia	(Argentina) José Giacone	(Costa Rica) Keilor Soto	Living Sport	Kölbi, Tracopa
Santos	Rafael Arias	(Costa Rica) Johnny Chávez	(Costa Rica) Edder Monguío	Living Sport	El Colono, Eusse, CopyVisión
Saprissa	Carlos Watson	(Costa Rica) Vladimir Quesada	(Costa Rica) Daniel Colindres	Kappa	Bimbo, Huawei, Toyota
UCR	Fernando Ocampo Cano	(Colombia) Marco Arias	(Costa Rica) Darío Delgado	Roma	INS

== Managerial changes ==
Team	Outgoing manager	Manner of departure	Date of vacancy	Position in table	Incoming manager	Date of appointment
Alajuelense	(Costa Rica) Wílmer López	Stepped back to assistant	19 December 2017	Pre-season	(Uruguay) Rubén Israel	19 December 2017
Herediano	(Costa Rica) Hernán Medford	Resigned	26 December 2017	Pre-season	(Costa Rica) Jafet Soto	2 January 2018
Liberia	(Costa Rica) Fernando Castro	End of caretaker spell	30 December 2017	Pre-season	(Uruguay) Víctor Abelenda	30 December 2017
Alajuelense	(Uruguay) Rubén Israel	Resigned	6 January 2018	Pre-season	(Uruguay) Nicolás dos Santos	6 January 2018

== League table ==
=== Regular season ===
==== Standings ====
Pos	Team	Pld	W	D	L	GF	GA	GD	Pts	Qualification
1	Saprissa	14	9	1	4	26	10	+16	28	Advance to the quadrangular and a possible final
2	Herediano	14	8	4	2	22	9	+13	28	Advance to the quadrangular
3	Alajuelense	14	7	3	4	25	15	+10	24	Advance to the quadrangular
4	Santos	14	6	6	2	19	10	+9	24	Advance to the quadrangular
5	Pérez Zeledón	14	5	5	4	18	18	0	20	
6	Guadalupe	14	4	6	4	18	19	−1	18	
7	Limón	14	4	6	4	17	18	−1	18	
8	UCR	14	4	5	5	13	18	−5	17	
9	Grecia	14	4	4	6	17	20	−3	16	
10	Carmelita	14	5	1	8	13	25	−12	16	
11	Cartaginés	14	1	6	7	11	21	−10	9	
12	Liberia	14	1	5	8	11	27	−16	8	

Rules for classification: 1) points; 2) goal difference; 3) goals scored; 4) head-to-head points; 5) head-to-head goal difference; 6) head-to-head goals scored; 7) draw

==== Positions by round ====
Quadrangular and possible final
Quadrangular
Relegation (Aggregate table)

Team ╲ Round	1	2	3	4	5	6	7	8	9	10	11	12	13	14	15	16	17	18	19	20	21	22
Saprissa	1	1	1								3	1	2	1								
Herediano	4	5									2	2	1	2								
Alajuelense	2	2	2								1	3	3	3								
Santos	5	9									6	5	4	4								
Pérez Zeledón	8	6									4	4	5	5								
Guadalupe	7	4									7	8	6	6								
Limón	6	8									10	10	9	7								
UCR	11	10									9	9	10	8								
Grecia	10	12	12								8	6	7	9								
Carmelita	3	3									5	7	8	10								
Cartaginés	9	7									12	11	11	11								
Liberia	12	11									11	12	12	12								

==== Results ====
Home \ Away	ALA	CRM	CAR	GRE	GUA	HER	LIB	LIM	PEZ	SAN	SAP	UCR
Alajuelense		MD22	MD16	2–3	1–0	1–0	4–0	1–0	MD15	MD20	MD18	4–0
Carmelita	0–5		2–1	MD21	1–4	1–2	MD19	MD17	0–1	1–2	MD15	1–0
Cartaginés	1–1	4–1		MD18	MD15	MD20	MD22	1–1	MD17	0–3	0–3	1–1
Grecia	1–2	2–1	0–0		2–3	MD15	2–0	1–1	MD19	0–0	MD17	MD22
Guadalupe	MD19	MD18	1–0	2–1		1–1	1–1	1–2	0–0	2–3	MD21	MD16
Herediano	1–1	0–1	3–0	3–0	MD17		6–3	MD19	2–0	MD22	1–0	1–1
Liberia	MD17	0–1	1–1	MD20	0–0	MD21		3–1	1–1	MD15	0–3	MD18
Limón	2–1	0–1	MD21	2–1	MD20	0–1	MD16		1–1	MD18	3–2	1–1
Pérez Zeledón	4–1	MD16	3–2	1–0	MD22	MD18	2–2	2–2		2–1	MD20	0–1
Santos	0–0	1–1	MD19	MD16	1–1	0–0	2–0	1–1	MD21		1–0	4–1
Saprissa	3–1	3–1	1–0	2–2	4–0	MD16	1–0	MD22	3–0	1–0		MD19
C.F. Universidad de Costa Rica	MD21	MD20	0–0	1–2	2–2	0–1	2–0	MD15	2–1	MD17	1–0	

Updated to match(es) played on unknown. Source:
Legend: Blue = home team win; Yellow = draw; Red = away team win.
