= Luis Swisher =

Guatemalan footballer

Personal information
- Full name: Luis Arturo Swisher Salguero
- Date of birth: 21 June 1978 (age 48)
- Place of birth: Guatemala City, Guatemala
- Height: 1.74 m (5 ft 9 in)
- Position: Defender

Senior career*
Years	Team	Apps	(Gls)
1998–2001	Aurora F.C.	63	(2)
2001–2002	Comunicaciones	9	(0)
2002	→ USAC (loan)	16	(3)
2002–2003	Cobán Imperial	32	(0)
2003–2004	Antigua GFC	25	(0)
2004–2005	CD Suchitepéquez	39	(1)
2005–2006	Polonia Warszawa	14	(0)
2006–2007	CD Suchitepéquez	16	(0)
2007–2008	Club Xelajú MC	57	(2)
2008–2009	Deportivo Jalapa	16	(0)
2009	Deportivo Petapa	8	(0)
2009–2013	USAC	153	(6)
Total		448	(14)

International career
2000–2007	Guatemala	23	(0)

Managerial career
- 2017–2018: FC Boulder USL 2
- 2018–2021: Saint Louis FC U19
- 2021–2022: St. Louis City SC U17
- 2022–2024: St. Louis City SC U21
- 2024–: St. Louis City SC U18
- * Club domestic league appearances and goals

Luis Arturo Swisher Salguero (born 21 June 1978) is a Guatemalan former professional footballer who played as a defender.

== Club career ==
Swisher started his professional career with Aurora F.C. making his debut with the club in 1997. He then played for some other local teams before he joined Polish side Polonia Warszawa from CD Suchitepéquez in June 2005, after several exceptional years in Guatemala. He lasted only two seasons in Europe and returned to Suchitepéquez only to play for four different teams in the next four seasons. After joining Petapa in 2009 he moved to USAC before the 2009–2010 season. In March 2010, his former club Jalapa were deducted 6 points for breach of contract after not paying the salaries of Swisher and Maynor Dávila. He became champion with Club Xelajú MC in 2007. He then moved to USAC before the 2009–2010 season. In June 2013, Swisher announces his retirement from professional football, making USAC his last team.

== International career ==
Swisher made his debut for Guatemala in a January 2000 friendly match against Panama and has, as of January 2010, earned a total of 23 caps, scoring no goals. He has represented his country in 9 FIFA World Cup qualification matches as well as at the 2002 CONCACAF Gold Cup. He then was not considered for the national team by Ramón Maradiaga for four years before returning to the squad in 2006 and to play at the 2007 CONCACAF Gold Cup. He also played at the UNCAF Nations Cup 2001 where they won the title.

== Managerial career ==
Following retirement, he began work as a coach for the New York Red Bulls Academy. Swisher was named head coach of FC Boulder of the USL Premier Development League for the 2017 season.

In June 2018, Swisher was appointed as the new coach of Saint Louis FC U19, bronze medalist finish on the 2018/19 season of the U.S. Soccer Development Academy. Swisher joined St. Louis City SC in June 2021, initially coaching the U17 team. He currently serves as the head coach of the U18 team. Previously, he coached the U21s, leading them to a runner-up finish in the 2024 United Premier Soccer League.

== Honours ==
Club Xelajú MC

- Liga Nacional de Guatemala: Clausura 2007

UNCAF Nations Cup 2001

- UNCAF Nations Cup 2001 Champion
