= Miguel Ángel Sánchez (Nicaraguan footballer) =

Nicaraguan footballer

Personal information
- Full name: Miguel Ángel Sánchez López
- Date of birth: July 2, 1980 (age 46)
- Place of birth: Somoto, Nicaragua
- Position: Forward

Senior career*
| Years | Team | Apps | (Gls) |
| 2001–2004 | Real Madriz | | |
| 2004–2006 | Diriangén | | |
| 2006–2013 | Real Madriz | | |
| 2013–2014 | Matagalpa | | |

International career
| 2004–2005 | Nicaragua | 7 | (0) |
- * Club domestic league appearances and goals

Miguel Ángel Sánchez López (born 2 July 1980) is a Nicaraguan footballer who played for Matagalpa.

== Club career ==
He has played for Nicaraguan league sides Real Madriz and Diriangén whom he left in summer 2006 to return to Madriz. His contract with Matagalpa was terminated in March 2014.

== International career ==
Sánchez made his debut for Nicaragua in a February 2004 friendly match against Haiti and has earned a total of 7 caps, scoring no goals. He has represented his country in 1 FIFA World Cup qualification match and played at the 2005 UNCAF Nations Cup.

His final international was a February 2005 UNCAF Nations Cup match against Belize.
