= Néstor Martínez =

Guatemalan footballer

Personal information
- Full name: Néstor Fernando Martínez Norales
- Date of birth: March 13, 1981 (age 45)
- Place of birth: Livingston, Guatemala
- Height: 1.71 m (5 ft 7 in)
- Position: Defender

Senior career*
Years	Team	Apps	(Gls)
2001–2006	Comunicaciones	69	(3)
2006–2009	Deportivo Marquense	25	(0)
2009	Deportivo Petapa		

International career^{‡}
2002–2007	Guatemala	51	(0)
- * Club domestic league appearances and goals as of 21 February 2010 ‡ National team caps and goals as of 21 February 2010

Néstor Martínez (born March 13, 1981) is a Guatemalan football defender who most recently played for Deportivo Petapa of Guatemala's second division.

== Club career ==
Martínez started his professional career at local giants Comunicaciones where he would win two league titles before moving to Deportivo Marquense in 2006. In summer 2009 he joined Petapa, but in November 2009 he was deemed surplus to requirements.

== International career ==
Martínez made his debut for Guatemala as a late substitute in an October 2002 friendly match against Jamaica and went on to collect a total of 51 caps, scoring no goals. He has represented his country in 11 FIFA World Cup qualification matches and at the 2003, 2005 and 2007 CONCACAF Gold Cup Finals as well as at the 2003, 2005 and 2007 UNCAF Cup tournaments.

His final international was a November 2007 friendly match, also against Jamaica.
