= Maynor Dávila =

Guatemalan footballer

Personal information
- Full name: Maynor Alejandro Dávila Reynoso
- Date of birth: February 12, 1982 (age 44)
- Place of birth: Guatemala City, Guatemala
- Height: 1.79 m (5 ft 10 1/2 in)
- Position: Midfielder

Team information
- Current team: Juventud Retalteca

Senior career*
Years	Team	Apps	(Gls)
2004–2005	Aurora	20	(1)
2005–2006	Comunicaciones	17	(1)
2006–2008	Zacapa		
2008–2009	Jalapa		
2009	CD Suchitepéquez		
2009–present	Juventud Retalteca		

International career^{‡}
2004–present	Guatemala	26	(1)
- * Club domestic league appearances and goals as of 13 July 2010 ‡ National team caps and goals as of 13 July 2010

Maynor Alejandro Dávila Reynoso (born 12 February 1982) is a Guatemalan football midfielder who currently plays for Juventud Retalteca of the Guatemalan premier division.

== Club career ==
Dávila started his professional career at army club Aurora and had a spell at Guatemalan giants Comunicaciones. In March 2010, his former club Jalapa were deducted 6 points for breach of contract after not paying the salaries of Dávila and Luis Swisher.

== International career ==
He made his debut for Guatemala in a July 2004 friendly match against El Salvador and has, as of May 2010, earned a total of 26 caps, scoring 1 goal. He has represented his country in 8 FIFA World Cup qualification matches and played at the 2005 UNCAF Nations Cup and the 2005 CONCACAF Gold Cup

His was recalled to the national team in June 2009 after a 4-year absence and played against Mexico and Canada.

=== International goals ===
Scores and results list. Guatemala's goal tally first.

#	Date	Venue	Opponent	Score	Result	Competition
1	2 October 2004	Lockhart Stadium, Fort Lauderdale, United States	Jamaica	0-2	2-2	Friendly match
