= Bryan Segura =

Costa Rican footballer (born 1997)

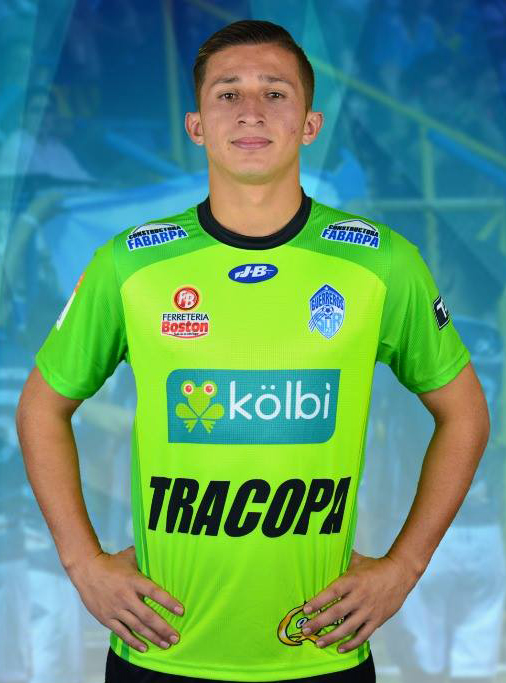

Personal information
- Full name: Bryan Andrés Segura Cruz
- Date of birth: 14 January 1997 (age 29)
- Place of birth: San Isidro de El General, Costa Rica
- Height: 1.80 m (5 ft 11 in)
- Position: Goalkeeper

Team information
- Current team: Pérez Zeledón
- Number: 1

Senior career*
Years	Team	Apps	(Gls)
2013–2019	Pérez Zeledón	101	(0)
2020–2024	Herediano	96	(0)
2024	→ Pérez Zeledón (loan)	36	(0)
2025–	Pérez Zeledón	20	(0)

International career^{‡}
2016	Costa Rica U20	2	(0)
2019	Costa Rica U23	2	(0)
- * Club domestic league appearances and goals as of 7 May 2025 ‡ National team caps and goals as of 21 July 2019

Bryan Andrés Segura Cruz (born 14 January 1997) is a Costa Rican football goalkeeper who plays for Liga FPD club Pérez Zeledón.

Segura has never been capped but has been benched four times for Costa Rica U20, at the 2017 FIFA U-20 World Cup, and seven times for Costa Rica, including at the 2019 CONCACAF Gold Cup.

== Career ==
Segura started his career with Pérez Zeledón.
