= Carlos Castillo (Guatemalan footballer) =

Guatemalan football midfielder

Personal information
- Full name: Carlos Rafael Castillo Rosales
- Date of birth: September 14, 1977 (age 49)
- Place of birth: Guatemala City, Guatemala
- Height: 1.77 m (5 ft 9 1/2 in)
- Position: Midfielder

Team information
- Current team: Municipal
- Number: 30

Senior career*
Years	Team	Apps	(Gls)
2002–2003	Municipal		
2004–2007	Xelajú MC	42	(1)
2007–2010	CD Suchitepéquez		
2010–	Municipal		

International career^{‡}
2004–present	Guatemala	25	(1)
- * Club domestic league appearances and goals as of 27 August 2010 ‡ National team caps and goals as of 27 August 2010

Carlos Rafael Castillo Rosales (born 14 September 1977) is a Guatemalan football midfielder who currently plays for Municipal in Guatemala's top division.

== Club career ==
Castillo started his professional career at local giants Municipal but had a longer spell at Xelajú MC and then CD Suchitepéquez. He returned to Municipal in summer 2010.

== International career ==
He made his debut for Guatemala in an October 2004 friendly match against Jamaica and, as of August 2010, has earned a total of 25 caps, scoring one goal. He has represented his country in 7 FIFA World Cup qualification match and played at the 2005 and 2009 UNCAF Nations Cups.

=== International goals ===
Scores and results list. Guatemala's goal tally first.

#	Date	Venue	Opponent	Score	Result	Competition
1	13 February 2005	Lockhart Stadium, Fort Lauderdale, United States	Haiti	2-1	2-1	Friendly match
