= Hernán Sandoval =

Guatemalan footballer

Personal information
- Full name: Hernán René Sandoval Villatoro
- Date of birth: July 22, 1983 (age 43)
- Place of birth: Guatemala City, Guatemala
- Height: 1.81 m (5 ft 11 in)
- Position: Forward

Team information
- Current team: Comunicaciones
- Number: 20

Youth career
- Comunicaciones

Senior career*
Years	Team	Apps	(Gls)
2004–2005	Comunicaciones	28	(7)
2005–2006	→ Antigua GFC (loan)	33	(15)
2006–present	Comunicaciones	24	(10)

International career^{‡}
2003–2007	Guatemala	20	(3)
- * Club domestic league appearances and goals as of 22 March 2010 ‡ National team caps and goals as of 22 March 2010

Hernán René Sandoval Villatoro (born 22 July 1983) is a Guatemalan football striker who plays for local club Comunicaciones in the Guatemala's top division.

== Club career ==
Nicknamed el Camello (the camel), Sandoval played for the U-20's of local giants Comunicaciones before becoming professional and has also had a loan spell at Antigua GFC. In November 2007 he suffered a double fracture of his right leg in a game against CD Zacapa which took him out of the game until the start of the 2009 preseason.

== International career ==
Sandoval made his debut for Guatemala in an August 2003 friendly match against Ecuador and has earned a total of 20 caps, scoring 3 goals. He has represented his country in 2 FIFA World Cup qualification matches as well as at the 2005 and 2007 CONCACAF Gold Cups and the UNCAF Nations Cup 2005.

His final international was an August 2007 friendly match against Panama.

== Career statistics ==
=== International ===
Appearances and goals by national team and year
National team	Year	Apps	Goals
Guatemala	2003	2	0
Guatemala	2005	13	2
Guatemala	2006	3	1
Guatemala	2007	2	0
Total		20	3

Scores and results list Guatemala's goal tally first, score column indicates score after each Sandoval goal.

List of international goals scored by Hernán Sandoval
No.	Date	Venue	Opponent	Score	Result	Competition	Ref.
1	21 February 2005	Estadio Mateo Flores, Guatemala City, Guatemala	Nicaragua	2–0	4–0	2005 UNCAF Nations Cup	
2	21 February 2005	Estadio Mateo Flores, Guatemala City, Guatemala	Nicaragua	4–0	4–0	2005 UNCAF Nations Cup	
3	6 September 2006	Estadio Mateo Flores, Guatemala City, Guatemala	Panama	1–2	1–2	Friendly	
