= Roy Myrie =

Costa Rican footballer (born 1982)

Personal information
- Full name: Roy Alexander Myrie Medrano
- Date of birth: 21 August 1982 (age 44)
- Place of birth: Limón, Costa Rica
- Height: 1.88 m (6 ft 2 in)
- Position: Defender

Senior career*
| Years | Team | Apps | (Gls) |
| 2001–2008 | Alajuelense | 75 | (6) |
| 2008–2012 | Gent | 32 | (1) |
| 2012–2013 | Uruguay De Coronado | 21 | (0) |
| 2013–2014 | Belén | 26 | (1) |
| 2014–2017 | Pérez Zeledón | | |

International career^{‡}
| 2005–2011 | Costa Rica | 22 | (6) |
- * Club domestic league appearances and goals as of 25 June 2014 ‡ National team caps and goals as of 21 June 2010

Roy Alexander Myrie Medrano (born 21 August 1982) is a Costa Rican former professional footballer who played as a defender.

== Club career ==
Myrie started his career at Alajuelense where he stayed for 7 years.

In 2005, he tested with PSV in the Netherlands, but after an injury during the testing, he was sent back to Costa Rica. In June 2008, he signed with Gent and stayed there until the summer of 2012.

=== KAA Gent ===
Myrie quickly became a player in the first team during the 2008–2009 season Myrie. His excellent dribbling was remarkable. After the winter he injured his knee and had a long period of rehabilitation. He missed the preparation and the first eight games of the season 2009/2010. He made his debut back in the home match against KVC Westerlo. He made the full game and he also did the next games. Shortly after he got injured again and it took three months before he played a match again. In late 2009 he was allowed to play after 80 minutes against SV Roeselare. After the match, he was as usual again a player in the basic team. But Myrie was unlucky, in early January 2011 he re-injured his knee and he couldn't play for months once again.

In September 2012 he moved to Uruguay De Coronado. After a year at Belén, he joined Pérez Zeledón in summer 2014.

== International career ==
Myrie has played at the 2001 FIFA World Youth Championship and was a member of the Costa Rica national football team at the 2004 Olympics in Athens.

Myrie made his senior debut for Costa Rica in a February 2005 friendly match against Ecuador and has, as of May 2014, earned a total of 22 caps, scoring 6 goals. He represented his country in 7 FIFA World Cup qualification matches and appeared in all four matches and scored twice as Costa Rica won the UNCAF Nations Cup 2005 tournament.

=== International goals ===
Scores and results list. Costa Rica's goal tally first.

| # | Date | Venue | Opponent | Score | Result | Competition |
|---|---|---|---|---|---|---|
| 1. | February 21, 2005 | Estadio Mateo Flores, Guatemala City, Guatemala | El Salvador | 2–1 | 2–1 | 2005 UNCAF Nations Cup qualification |
| 2. | February 23, 2005 | Estadio Mateo Flores, Guatemala City, Guatemala | Panama | 1–0 | 1–0 | 2005 UNCAF Nations Cup qualification |
| 3. | March 26, 2005 | Estadio Ricardo Saprissa, San José, Costa Rica | Panama | 2–1 | 2–1 | 2006 World Cup qualification |
| 4. | October 12, 2005 | Estadio Mateo Flores, [uatemala City, Guatemala | Guatemala | 3–1 | 3–1 | 2006 World Cup qualification |
| 5. | November 19, 2008 | Estadio Cuscatlán, San Salvador, El Salvador | El Salvador | 1–1 | 3–1 | 2010 World Cup qualification |
| 6. | November 19, 2008 | Estadio Cuscatlán, San Salvador, El Salvador | El Salvador | 3–1 | 3–1 | 2010 World Cup qualification |

== Personal life ==
Roy is the elder brother of fellow Costa Rican international defender David Myrie.
