= Juan Ramón Solís =

Panamanian footballer (born 1984)

Personal information
- Full name: Juan Ramón Solís Barragán
- Date of birth: June 14, 1984 (age 42)
- Place of birth: Chitré, Herrera, Panama
- Height: 1.77 m (5 ft 10 in)
- Position: Defensive midfielder

Youth career
- Pan de Azúcar
- 1999: Sporting'89

Senior career*
Years	Team	Apps	(Gls)
2002–2006	San Francisco	66	(5)
2005	Envigado		
2007	Águila	25	(1)
2007–2012	San Francisco	56	(6)
2010	Belize Defence Force		
2013	Sporting San Miguelito	32	(0)
2014–2015	Plaza Amador	28	(1)

International career^{‡}
2003–2010	Panama	25	(2)
- * Club domestic league appearances and goals as of 18 June 2007 ‡ National team caps and goals as of 1 August 2015

Juan Ramón Solís Barragán (born June 14, 1984) is a retired Panamanian football midfielder.

== Club career ==
Juanra played in the Pan de Azúcar youth teams and made his senior debut in 1999 for Sporting '89, then played for San Francisco and moved abroad to play in Colombia with Envigado in 2005 and for Salvadoran side Águila in February 2007. He returned for another lengthy spell at San Francisco and moved to Sporting San Miguelito in January 2013, only to leave them in October 2013 after he claimed the club owed him money. He was snapped up by Plaza Amador in January 2014.

He retired in December 2014, after several knee injuries had hampered his career.

== International career ==
Solís participated in the 2003 FIFA World Youth Championship held in the United Arab Emirates as captain of the first Panama representative football team who qualified to the final phase of any football World Cup.

He made his senior debut for Panama in a February 2003 UNCAF Nations Cup match El Salvador and has earned a total of 25 caps, scoring 2 goals. He represented his country in 4 FIFA World Cup qualification matches and played seven matches at the 2003 and 2005 UNCAF Nations Cups.

His final international was an October 2010 friendly match against Cuba.

=== International goals ===
Scores and results list. Panama's goal tally first.

#	Date	Venue	Opponent	Score	Result	Competition
1.	August 20, 2003	Estadio Rommel Fernández, Panama City, Panama	Paraguay	1–2	1–2	Friendly
2.	February 19, 2005	Estadio Mateo Flores, Guatemala City, Guatemala	El Salvador	1–0	1–0	Continental qualifier

== Honors ==
Club

- ANAPROF (2): 2007 (A), 2008 (A)
