= William Sunsing =

Costa Rican bodybuilder and footballer (born 1977)

Personal information
- Full name: William Sunsing Hidalgo
- Date of birth: May 12, 1977 (age 49)
- Place of birth: Heredia, Costa Rica
- Height: 1.75 m (5 ft 9 in)
- Position: Winger

Senior career*
| Years | Team | Apps | (Gls) |
| 1994–1996 | Herediano | | |
| 1996–1998 | Ramonense | | |
| 1998–2000 | Herediano | | |
| 2000–2001 | New England Revolution | 48 | (4) |
| 2002 | Herediano | | |
| 2003 | Saprissa | | (1) |
| 2003 | Ramonense | | |
| 2004 | Santa Bárbara | | (1) |
| 2004–2005 | Pérez Zeledón | 21 | (9) |
| 2005 | → Teplice (loan) | 8 | (0) |
| 2006 | → Akratitos (loan) | 9 | (0) |
| 2006–2007 | Brujas | 47 | (8) |
| 2008–2010 | Liberia Mía | 78 | (17) |
| 2010 | Brujas | 11 | (1) |
| 2011 | Limón | 14 | (6) |
| 2011 | Orión | 4 | (0) |
| 2011 | Cobán Imperial | | |
| 2012 | Sayaxché | | |

International career
| 2000–2009 | Costa Rica | 35 | (4) |
- * Club domestic league appearances and goals

William Sunsing Hidalgo (born 12 May 1977) is a Costa Rican bodybuilder and former football player.

== Association football career ==
=== Club career ===
The dreadlocked Sunsing made his professional debut for played for Herediano on 5 April 1995 against San Carlos and scored his first goal on 5 March 1997 for Ramonense against Saprissa. A much-travelled winger, he played abroad for New England Revolution in the United States, FK Teplice in the Czech Republic and Akratitos in Greece where he played alongside compatriots Froylán Ledezma and Berny Peña. He also played for Deportivo Saprissa, Santa Bárbara and Pérez Zeledón in Costa Rica. He was nicknamed The Menace during his trip through Major League Soccer.

In summer 2007 Brujas sold Sunsing to Liberia Mía where he signed for three years.

He joined Limón in December 2010, but left them in summer 2011 after falling out with manager Ronald Mora. He later left Orión in September 2011 due to financial problems at the club which allowed him to move abroad to play in Guatemala for Cobán Imperial. His final club was Guatemala second division outfit Sayaxché after Xelajú were unable to lure him away from Cobán.

Sunsing retired on 7 December 2012, after amassing 352 Costa Rica Primera División matches in which he scored 76 goals.

=== International career ===
Sunsing made his debut for Costa Rica in a January 2000 friendly match against Trinidad & Tobago and earned a total of 35 caps, scoring 4 goals. He represented his country in 18 FIFA World Cup qualification matches and was a non-playing squad member at the 2002 FIFA World Cup and the 2001 Copa América. He scored the only goal in the only ever match the Ticos won over Jamaica, in 2001.

He also played at the 2000 and 2002 CONCACAF Gold Cups.

His final international was a September 2009 FIFA World Cup qualification match against El Salvador.

== Bodybuilding career ==
In 2019, Sunsing made his debut as a bodybuilder.

== Personal life ==
Sunsing is married to Ivannia Quesada and has a daughter, Keylin.

== See also ==
- List of Costa Rican MLS players
