= Alonso Solís =

Costa Rican footballer and singer (born 1978)

Alonso Solís Calderón
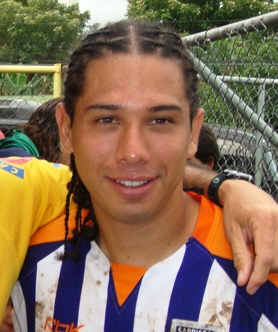
- Solís with Saprissa in 2007

Personal information
- Full name: Alonso Jorge Solís Calderón
- Date of birth: October 14, 1978 (age 48)
- Place of birth: San Jose, Costa Rica
- Height: 1.78 m (5 ft 10 in)
- Positions: Attacking midfielder; striker

Youth career
- –1995: Deportivo Saprissa

Senior career*
Years	Team	Apps	(Gls)
1996–1997	Saprissa	3	(1)
1998	Universidad Católica		(0)
1998–1999	Saprissa	22	(6)
1999–2001	OFI	17	(3)
2001–2002	Saprissa	25	(10)
2002	Brann	14	(4)
2002–2012	Saprissa	190	(79)
2008	→ Necaxa (loan)	9	(1)
2013	San Francisco de Dos Ríos		
2013	Generación Saprissa		

International career
1999–2008	Costa Rica	48	(9)
- * Club domestic league appearances and goals as of June 1, 2008

Alonso Jorge Solís Calderón (born October 14, 1978) is a Costa Rican retired footballer and singer who played for Saprissa as attacking midfielder or striker.

== Club career ==
Known as El Mariachi, Solís made his professional debut for Saprissa on 28 January 1996 against Municipal Pérez Zeledón and scored his first goal on 13 April 1997 against Carmelita.

=== Europe ===
He then spent a good deal of time abroad, with Universidad Católica in Chile, OFI in Greece, and SK Brann in Norway.

=== Saprissa ===
Solís had an awe-inspiring 2003/4 season with Saprissa, finishing third in the league in goals with 17 while leading Saprissa to an easy first-place finish in the league. With Saprissa, he has won four national championships and a CONCACAF Champions Cup, and was part of the team that played the 2005 FIFA Club World Championship, where Saprissa finished third behind São Paulo and Liverpool. His club career was a testament to his skill and dedication to the sport.

Due to his performance, at the end of the last season, he received many offers from clubs in Mexico, Brazil, and even in Costa Rica, but he decided to stay in Saprissa. Due to Walter Gaitán's injury, Solis was loaned to Necaxa for 3 months, starting on March 17, 2008. The Mexicans could not offer him a contract due to the foreign player quota. He was one of the most loved and claimed by the crowd while he played at Deportivo Saprissa. In his final game with Saprissa, visiting archrival Liga Deportiva Alajuelense, Solis scored an excellent goal, which gave them the 0–1 win, Saprissa's 9th consecutive win in the 2008 Clausura Championship. He ended up playing 292 league games for Saprissa, scoring 98 goals.

In January 2012, Solís was signed by Bengal Premier League side Durgapur only to discover the league was postponed and eventually cancelled.

In November 2012, he was cleared to play for LINAFA outfit San Francisco de Dos Ríos, after having officially retired In August 2013, Solís made his debut as player-manager for second division side Generación Saprissa, Saprissa's reserve team.

== International career ==
At junior level, he played in the 1995 FIFA U-17 World Championship held in Ecuador, and the 1997 FIFA World Youth Championship held in Malaysia.

Solís made his debut for Costa Rica in a May 1999 friendly match against Chile and earned a total of 48 caps, scoring eight goals. He represented his country in 18 FIFA World Cup qualification matches and played at the 2003, 2005, and 2007 UNCAF Nations Cup, as well as at the 2007 CONCACAF Gold Cup and the 2004 Copa América.

Alonso Solís's final international match was an October 2008 FIFA World Cup qualification game against the Haiti. This match marked the end of his illustrious career with Costa Rica.
