= Berny Peña =

Costa Rican footballer (born 1980)

Bernabé "Berny" Peña
Personal information
- Full name: Berny Peña Pizarro
- Date of birth: 19 October 1980 (age 46)
- Place of birth: Carrillo, Costa Rica
- Height: 1.84 m (6 ft 0 in)
- Position: Defender

Senior career*
Years	Team	Apps	(Gls)
2002–2004	Guanacasteca		
2004–2005	Municipal Liberia	26	(3)
2005–2010	Brujas	98	(6)
2006	→ Akratitos (loan)	12	(0)
2007	→ Municipal Liberia (loan)	10	(1)
2009	→ Kavala (loan)	7	(1)
2010	Municipal Liberia		
2011	Deportivo Quevedo	9	(0)
2011	Platense		

International career
2005	Costa Rica	5	(0)
- * Club domestic league appearances and goals as of 1 June 2008

Bernabé "Berny" Peña Pizarro (born 19 October 1980) is a Costa Rican football player.

In a 2009 Al Día poll of 71 Costa Rica Premier Division players, Peña was selected as the dirtiest player in the league. He responded, "You have never seen any of my rivals die after one of my fouls, so I don't see the dirty play people talk about".

== Club career ==
He started his career at Guanacasteca, before joining Municipal Liberia in 2004. A year later he signed for Brujas. He was sent on loan to Greek club Akratitos, where he played alongside compatriots Froylán Ledezma and William Sunsing, but could not save the club from relegation. He then was loaned back to Municipal Liberia and again to Greece to play for second division Kavala. In summer 2010 he returned to Liberia Mía/Águilas Guanacastecas and later had spells in Ecuador with Deportivo Quevedo, whom he left after only three months and in Honduras with Platense, whom he left in November 2011 after new coach Roque Alfaro told him he did not fit into his plans.

== International career ==
He was first called up by Steve Sampson in 2004, but Peña made his debut for Costa Rica in a February 2005 friendly match against Ecuador and has earned a total of 5 caps, scoring no goals. He represented his country at the 2005 UNCAF Nations Cup.

His final international was a February 2005 UNCAF Nations Cup match against Honduras.
