= Anthony Adderly =

Belizean football manager (born 1968)

Personal information
- Date of birth: 5 May 1968 (age 58)
- Place of birth: Belize

Senior career*
Years	Team	Apps	(Gls)
1974–1975	Berger 404		

International career
- Belize

Managerial career
- 1997–2000: Grigamandala
- 2003–2006: Belize
- * Club domestic league appearances and goals

Anthony "Garrincha" Adderly (born 5 May 1968) is a Belizean football former player and manager who managed the Belize national team and played for Berger 404 in Belize.

Garrincha played for Berger 404 for two or three years in the 1970s. He also coached the national team from 1 July 2003 to 30 June 2005. His record is 0-5 with the national team. They lost twice to Canada in the 2006 FIFA World Cup qualification – CONCACAF second round by identical 0-4 scores on 13 June and 16 June 2004, and lost all three matches in Group A in the qualifying round of the 2005 Gold Cup, to Guatemala (0-2, 19 February 2005), Honduras (0-4, 21 February) and Nicaragua (0-1, 23 February).

His older brother James was also a footballer; he also played for Berger 404, at left wing.
