= Erick Scott =

Costa Rican footballer (born 1981)

Personal information
- Full name: Erick Arnoldo Scott Bernard
- Date of birth: May 21, 1981 (age 45)
- Place of birth: Limón, Costa Rica
- Height: 1.69 m (5 ft 6 1/2 in)
- Position: Striker

Team information
- Current team: Limón
- Number: 27

Youth career
- Alajuelense

Senior career*
Years	Team	Apps	(Gls)
2001–2004	Alajuelense	79	(43)
2004	Columbus Crew	6	(0)
2005–2007	Alajuelense	29	(9)
2007	→ Marathón (loan)		(7)
2008	Shanghai Shenhua	26	(5)
2009	Marathón		(4)
2010	Alajuelense	21	(2)
2010	Luis Ángel Firpo		
2011	San Carlos	21	(9)
2011	Saprissa	10	(1)
2012	Santos de Guápiles	20	(3)
2012–2013	Uruguay de Coronado	40	(10)
2013–2014	Cartaginés	39	(10)
2014	Uruguay de Coronado		
2015–	Limón		

International career^{‡}
2002–2012	Costa Rica	28	(7)
- * Club domestic league appearances and goals ‡ National team caps and goals as of October 7, 2012

Erick Arnoldo Scott Bernard (born 21 May 1981) is a Costa Rican professional footballer who currently plays for Limón.

== Club career ==
Scott joined the Columbus Crew of Major League Soccer on loan in March 2004, after several exceptional years with Alajuelense, with whom he had played since May 2001. Scott scored 13 goals in the 2001–02 season, and another 20 in the 2002–03 season, propelling Alajuelense to two straight league titles. Scott also scored several goals against MLS and Mexican league teams in the CONCACAF Champions Cup, and was a key player during his first episode with Alajuelense.

After joining the Crew, however, Scott saw minimal playing time, and did not return for the 2005 season. He was picked up by Real Salt Lake with the last pick of the 2004 MLS Expansion Draft, but was not brought into the squad. Instead, he stayed in Costa Rica and returned to Alajuelense.

Scott found himself playing with a different squad and a different manager at Alajuelense, and his performances were not up to the level they were when he left the squad less than a year earlier. Accordingly, he wasn't involved in many matches during what was left of the 2005 Clausura tournament. Observers expected him to begin the following Apertura tournament in the starting line-up but due some differences with fans and some members of the managerial team, he was sent on loan for 6 months to Marathón in Honduras.

He returned to fitness and started playing well for Marathón, scoring important goals as the club won the 2007 championship. This resulted in attention from clubs in the Chinese Super League, and ultimately in a move to Shanghai Shenhua in January 2008 along with Honduran player Emil Martinez. They were teammates at Alajuelense and at Marathón and were acquired together by the Chinese team. He returned to Marathón ahead of the 2009 Clausura.

In summer 2010, Scott moved to Salvadoran side Luis Ángel Firpo after Alajuelense did not want to renew his contract. In summer 2011, Scott joined Saprissa from San Carlos only to leave them in January 2012 for Santos de Guápiles.

In June 2013, Scott joined Cartaginés, only for the club to release him a year later.

== International career ==
Scott has made 28 appearances for the senior Costa Rica national team, scoring 7 goals in the process. At the youth level, he appeared in the 2001 World Youth Championship held in Argentina as well as the 2004 Summer Olympics. Scott made his debut for the senior team in a friendly match against Ecuador on October 16, 2002. He has appeared in the UNCAF Nations Cup 2003 and UNCAF Nations Cup 2005, as well as the 2003 CONCACAF Gold Cup held in the United States. Additionally, he appeared in five qualifying matches for the 2006 FIFA World Cup.

Scott was recently called into the Costa Rica national team for a 2010 FIFA World Cup qualifying match, where he was an unused substitute.

== Career statistics ==
=== International goals ===
Scores and results list. Costa Rica's goal tally first.

#	Date	Venue	Opponent	Score	Result	Competition
1.	February 11, 2003	Estadio Rommel Fernández, Panama City, Panama	Nicaragua	1–0	1–0	Continental qualifier
2.	February 15, 2003	Estadio Rommel Fernández, Panama City, Panama	El Salvador	1–0	1–0	Continental qualifier
3.	July 16, 2003	Gillette Stadium, Foxboro, Massachusetts, United States	Cuba	3–0	3–0	Continental championship
4.	July 19, 2003	Gillette Stadium, Foxboro, Massachusetts, United States	El Salvador	1–0	5–2	Continental championship
5.	June 4, 2004	Estadio Carlos Ugalde Álvarez, San Carlos, Costa Rica	Nicaragua	1–0	5–0	Friendly
6.	January 12, 2005	Estadio Ricardo Saprissa, San José, Costa Rica	Haiti	2–0	3–3	Friendly
7.	February 25, 2005	Estadio Mateo Flores, Guatemala City, Guatemala	Guatemala	4–0	4–0	Continental qualifier
