= Edwin Villatoro =

Guatemalan footballer

Personal information
- Full name: Edwin Roberto Villatoro Acevedo
- Date of birth: 18 February 1980 (age 46)
- Place of birth: Guatemala City, Guatemala
- Height: 1.68 m (5 ft 6 in)
- Position: Striker

Team information
- Current team: Chiquimulilla

Senior career*
Years	Team	Apps	(Gls)
2004–2006	Suchitepéquez	75	(31)
2006–2007	Municipal	20	(4)
2007–2008	Suchitepéquez	23	(6)
2008	Municipal		
2008–2012	Suchitepéquez		
2012–2013	Xelajú	38	(3)
2013-2016	Nueva Concepción		
2016-2017	Sacachispas		
2017-2018	Nueva Concepción		
2018-2021	Suchitepéquez		
2021–2022	Nueva Concepción	16	(3)
2022-	Chiquimulilla	0	(0)

International career^{‡}
2005–2009	Guatemala	28	(6)
- * Club domestic league appearances and goals as of 21 August 2021 ‡ National team caps and goals as of October 29, 2008

Edwin Roberto Villatoro Acevedo (born 18 February 1980 in Guatemala City) is a Guatemalan football forward who currently plays for Segunda Division club Chiquimulilla.

== Club career ==
Villatoro started his career at Suchitepéquez and has also had two spells at local giants CSD Municipal.

== International career ==
Villatoro made his debut for Guatemala in a January 2005 friendly match against Colombia and has, as of January 2010, earned a total of 27 caps, scoring 5 goals. He has represented his country in 4 FIFA World Cup qualification matches and played two matches at the 2005 CONCACAF Gold Cup. He played in five matches at the UNCAF Nations Cup 2005, where he scored three goals.

== Career statistics ==
=== International goals ===
Scores and results list. Guatemala's goal tally first.

#	Date	Venue	Opponent	Score	Result	Competition
1	February 13, 2005	Lockhart Stadium, Fort Lauderdale, United States	Haiti	1–0	2–1	Friendly
2	February 19, 2005	Estadio Mateo Flores, Guatemala City, Guatemala	Belize	1–0	2–0	Continental qualifier
3	February 21, 2005	Estadio Mateo Flores, Guatemala City, Guatemala	Nicaragua	3–0	4–0	Continental qualifier
4	February 27, 2005	Estadio Mateo Flores, Guatemala City, Guatemala	Panama	1–0	3–0	Continental qualifier
5	June 8, 2005	Estadio Ricardo Saprissa, San José, Costa Rica	Costa Rica	1–2	2–3	2006 FIFA World Cup qualification
