= Géiner Segura =

Costa Rican footballer (born 1974)

Personal information
- Full name: Géiner Segura Mora
- Date of birth: October 14, 1974 (age 52)
- Place of birth: Costa Rica
- Height: 1.72 m (5 ft 7 1/2 in)
- Position: Midfielder

Team information
- Current team: Alajuelense (Assistant coach)

Senior career*
Years	Team	Apps	(Gls)
1994–1995	Pérez Zeledón		
1995–1997	Cartaginés		
1997–2006	Pérez Zeledón	137	(5)
2007	Santos de Guápiles		
2007–2008	Brujas	19	(0)
2008–2009	Universidad	21	(0)
2009	Águilas Guanacastecas		
2010–2012	San Carlos	56	(0)
Total		529	

International career
1995–2005	Costa Rica	13	(1)

Managerial career
- 2013–2016: San Carlos (assistant)
- 2016: San Carlos
- 2017: AD Cofutpa
- 2018–2020: Guadalupe
- 2020–: Alajuelense (assistant)
- * Club domestic league appearances and goals

Géiner Segura Mora (born 14 October 1974) is a retired Costa Rican professional football player. He is currently a coach.

== Club career ==
Segura made his Primera Division debut for Municipal Pérez Zeledón on 9 February 1994 then played for Cartagines before returning to play 10 seasons for Municipal Pérez Zeledón. In 2007, he decided to call it a day at Pérez Zeledón and signed for Santos de Guápiles only to leave them a few months later for Brujas. After playing a year for Universidad he had a season at second division Águilas Guanacastecas. He joined San Carlos ahead of the 2010 Verano season.

=== Retirement ===
In a 19-season career, Segura has appeared in 529 Costa Rican league matches, he retired in November 2012. He has made the third-most all-time league appearances for Pérez Zeledón with 365 league matches.

== International career ==
The midfielder made his debut for the Ticos in 1995 against the USA and played in the Korea Cup that year, but was left out for 10 years to be recalled for a friendly international against Haïti in 2005. He then also played at the UNCAF Nations Cup 2005 and the 2005 CONCACAF Gold Cup.

He collected a total of 13 caps, scoring 1 goal.

== Career statistics ==
=== International goals ===
Scores and results list. Costa Rica's goal tally first.

#	Date	Venue	Opponent	Score	Result	Competition
1.	February 25, 2005	Estadio Mateo Flores, Guatemala City, Guatemala	Guatemala	1–0	4–0	Continental qualifier

== Personal life ==
Segura is married to Vanessa Jorge and they have three children.
