= Whayne Wilson =

Costa Rican footballer (1975–2005)

Personal information
- Full name: Whayne Wilson Harris
- Date of birth: September 7, 1975
- Place of birth: Limón, Costa Rica
- Date of death: May 18, 2005 (aged 29)
- Place of death: San José, Costa Rica
- Position: Striker

Senior career*
Years	Team	Apps	(Gls)
1995–1997	Limonense		
1997–1999	Herediano		(6)
1999–2001	Cartaginés		(25)
2001–2002	Herediano		(10)
2002–2003	Santos de Guápiles		(2)
2003–2004	Ramonense		(20)
2004	Cartaginés		(4)
2005	Brujas		(5)
Total		192	(72)

International career
2004–2005	Costa Rica	8	(4)
- * Club domestic league appearances and goals

Whayne Wilson Harris (born 7 September 1975 in Limón – died 18 May 2005 in Costa Rica) was a Costa Rican professional footballer.

== Club career ==
Wilson started his career at second division Limonense and made his professional debut with Herediano on November 26, 1997, and scored his first league goal for Herediano against Goicoechea on March 4, 1998. He had his best season with Ramonense where he scored 20 goals to be the second leading scorer of the 2003–04 season. Wilson played for Cartaginés and then Brujas during the 2004–05 season. Overall, he scored 72 goals in 192 matches in the Primera División de Costa Rica.

His brother Kéndall is also a professional footballer.

== International career ==
Wilson made 8 appearances for the senior Costa Rica national football team, his debut coming in the Copa América 2004 against Chile on 16 February 2005. He appeared in all four matches and scored three goals as Costa Rica won the UNCAF Nations Cup 2005 tournament. Wilson also made two appearances during qualifying for the 2006 FIFA World Cup.

Wilson was a member of the Costa Rica national football team at the 2004 Summer Olympics in Athens.

== Death ==
On May 14, 2005, Wilson's car collided with a truck on a highway along the Caribbean coast of Costa Rica. Wilson died four days later in the Calderón Guardia hospital in San José, Costa Rica. He is survived by four young daughters and his partner Corina McKenzie. In 2011 another Costa Rican international, Dennis Marshall, died in a car accident on the same road.

== Career statistics ==
=== International goals ===
Scores and results list. Costa Rica's goal tally first.

#	Date	Venue	Opponent	Score	Result	Competition
1	February 21, 2005	Estadio Mateo Flores, Guatemala City, Guatemala	El Salvador	1–0	2–1	2005 UNCAF Nations Cup
2	February 25, 2005	Estadio Mateo Flores, Guatemala City, Guatemala	Guatemala	3–0	4–0	2005 UNCAF Nations Cup
3	February 27, 2005	Estadio Mateo Flores, Guatemala City, Guatemala	Honduras	1–1	1–1	2005 UNCAF Nations Cup
4	March 26, 2005	Estadio Ricardo Saprissa, San José, Costa Rica	Panama	1–0	2–1	2006 FIFA World Cup qualification
