= Júnior Díaz (footballer, born 1983) =

Costa Rican footballer (born 1983)

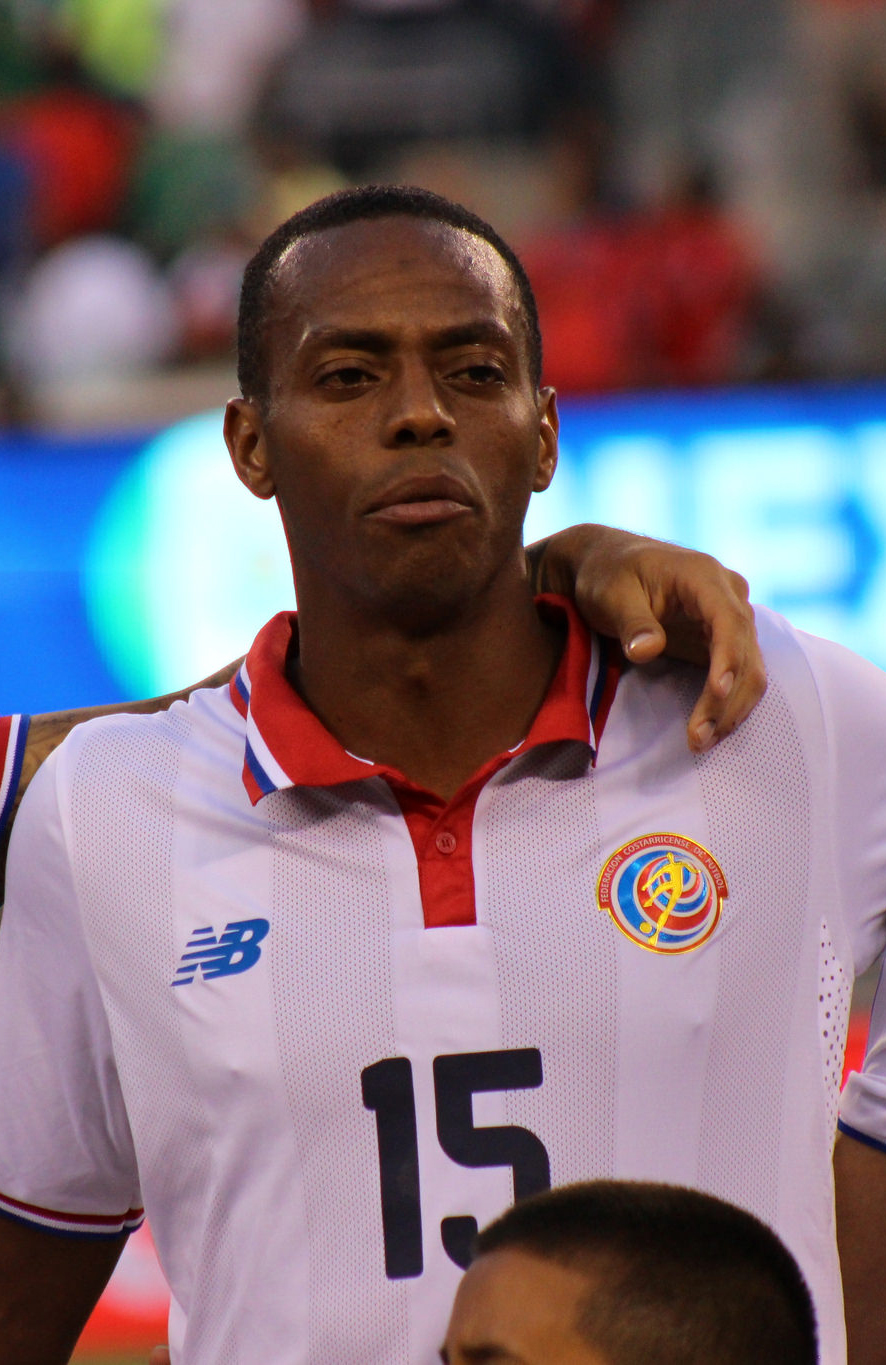
- Díaz before a match against Mexico at the 2015 CONCACAF Gold Cup

Personal information
- Full name: Júnior Enrique Díaz Campbell
- Date of birth: 12 September 1983 (age 43)
- Place of birth: Heredia, Costa Rica
- Height: 1.85 m (6 ft 1 in)
- Position: Left-back

Senior career*
Years	Team	Apps	(Gls)
2003–2007	Herediano	129	(10)
2008–2010	Wisła Kraków	66	(5)
2010–2012	Club Brugge	13	(0)
2011–2012	→ Wisła Kraków (loan)	20	(1)
2012–2015	Mainz 05	57	(2)
2015–2016	Darmstadt 98	12	(0)
2016–2017	Würzburger Kickers	24	(0)
2017–2019	Herediano	49	(2)
2019–2021	LD Alajuelense	58	(2)

International career
2002	Costa Rica U20	6	(0)
2003–2004	Costa Rica U23	17	(4)
2003–2016	Costa Rica	81	(1)
- * Club domestic league appearances and goals

Júnior Enrique Díaz Campbell (born 12 September 1983) is a Costa Rican former professional footballer who played as a left-back. He played for the Costa Rica national team. At a top speed of 33.8 km/h, he was deemed by FIFA as the fastest player of the 2014 FIFA World Cup.

== Club career ==
Born in Heredia, Costa Rica, Díaz started his career at local side Herediano before moving abroad to join Polish side Wisła Kraków in January 2008. He moved on to Belgian club Club Brugge in September 2010 and was snapped up by German Bundesliga outfit Mainz 05 in summer 2012.

In 2015, after three years in Mainz, Díaz joined Darmstadt 98, a newly promoted team for the 2015–16 season.

== International career ==
Júnior Díaz made his Costa Rica national team debut in a friendly against China on 7 September 2003. Díaz made one appearance at Copa América 2004, entering as a second-half substitute against Chile. He appeared in all four matches as Costa Rica won the UNCAF Nations Cup 2005 tournament. Díaz also appeared in one match at the 2005 CONCACAF Gold Cup finals.

Díaz was a member of the Costa Rica national team at the 2004 Olympics in Athens. Ten years later, he became a member of the squad that reached the quarterfinals at the 2014 FIFA World Cup. He was crucial in the victory against Italy, as he served a cross to assist Bryan Ruiz's header for the lone goal of the match. In a note for La Nación, Díaz reflected on the assist, stating that "I am sure that, once I retire, many will summarize my career in one single cross."

== Personal life ==
He is a son of former Costa Rica international footballer Enrique Díaz and Yamileth Campbell, who divorced when he was 12. He has two brothers, Jefferson and Reydel.

== Career statistics ==
=== Club ===
As of 8 July 2013

Appearances and goals by club, season and competition
Club	Season	League			National cups		Continental		Total	
Club	Season	Division	Apps	Goals	Apps	Goals	Apps	Goals	Apps	Goals
Herediano	2003–04	Primera División	36	1	–		–		36	1
Herediano	2004–05	Primera División	16	1	–		4	0	20	1
Herediano	2005–06	Primera División	26	3	–		–		26	3
Herediano	2006–07	Primera División	33	2	–		–		33	2
Herediano	Apertura 2007	Primera División	18	3	–		–		18	3
Herediano	Total		129	10	–		4	0	133	10
Wisła Kraków	2007–08	Ekstraklasa	7	1	9	0	–		16	1
Wisła Kraków	2008–09	Ekstraklasa	28	2	5	2	5	1	38	5
Wisła Kraków	2009–10	Ekstraklasa	27	2	5	1	2	0	34	3
Wisła Kraków	2010–11	Ekstraklasa	4	0	0	0	3	1	7	1
Wisła Kraków	Total		66	5	19	3	10	2	95	10
Club Brugge	2010–11	Pro League	13	0	0	0	4	0	17	0
Wisła Kraków (loan)	2011–12	Ekstraklasa	20	1	4	0	12	0	36	1
Mainz 05	2012–13	Bundesliga	18	1	3	0	–		21	1
Mainz 05	2013–14	Bundesliga	20	0	0	0	–		20	0
Mainz 05	2014–15	Bundesliga	19	1	1	0	–		20	1
Mainz 05	Total		57	2	4	0	–		61	2
Career total			285	18	27	3	30	2	342	23

=== International ===
Scores and results list Costa Rica's goal tally first, score column indicates score after each Díaz goal.

List of international goals scored by Júnior Díaz
No.	Date	Venue	Opponent	Score	Result	Competition
1	15 October 2008	Estadio Ricardo Saprissa, San José, Costa Rica	Haiti	1–0	2–0	2010 FIFA World Cup qualification

== Honours ==
Wisła Kraków

- Ekstraklasa: 2007–08, 2008–09, 2010–11

Alajuelense

- Liga FPD: Apertura 2020
- CONCACAF League: 2018, 2020

International

- UNCAF Nations Cup: 2005
