= Jafet Soto =

Costa Rican footballer (born 1976)

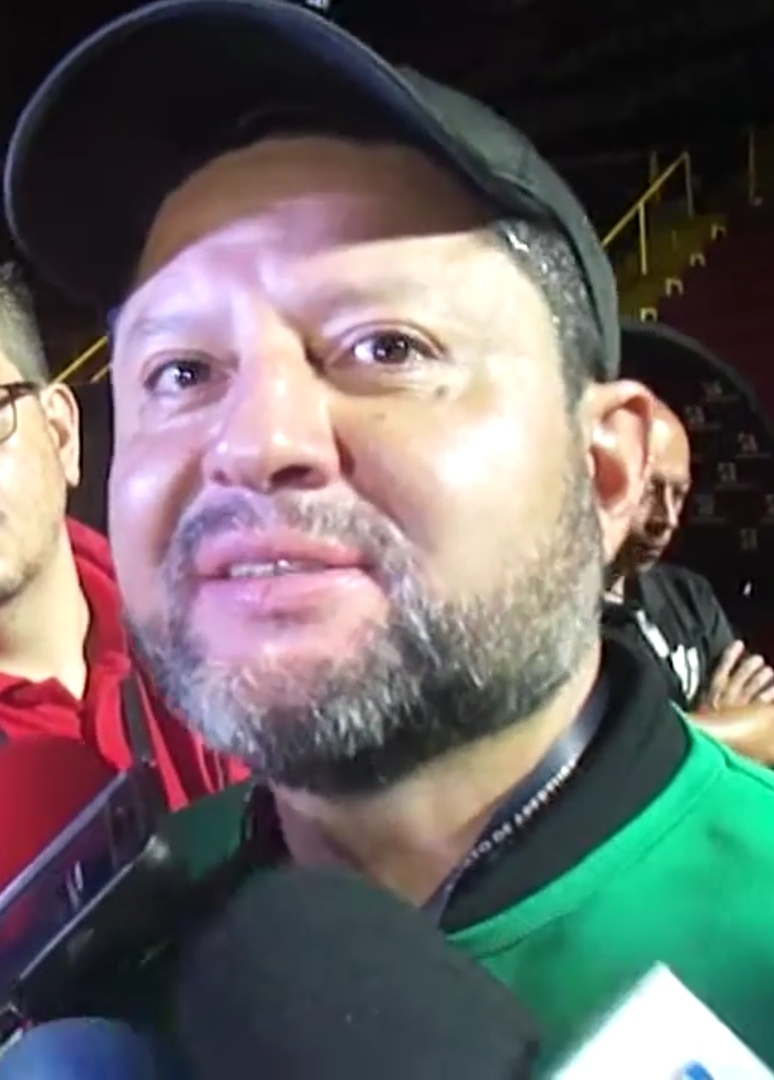
- Soto in 2020

Personal information
- Full name: Jafet Soto Molina
- Date of birth: 1 April 1976 (age 50)
- Place of birth: San José, Costa Rica
- Height: 1.73 m (5 ft 8 in)
- Position: Midfielder

Senior career*
Years	Team	Apps	(Gls)
1994–1995	Herediano		
1995–1998	Atlético Morelia	67	(10)
1998	Atlas	21	(3)
1998–1999	Pachuca	30	(2)
1999–2000	Puebla	33	(14)
2000–2001	UAG	28	(9)
2001	Morelia	1	(0)
2002	Puebla	15	(2)
2003	Herediano		
2003–2004	Puebla	16	(3)
2004–2006	Herediano	58	(4)
2006	Real Salt Lake	8	(1)
2007–2009	Herediano	48	(7)

International career
1994–2005	Costa Rica	63	(10)

Managerial career
- 2011–2012: Herediano
- 2012: Pérez Zeledón
- 2012–2013: Costa Rica U20
- 2014–: Herediano
- 2014–: Costa Rica (assistant)
- * Club domestic league appearances and goals

Jafet Soto Molina (born 1 April 1976), is a Costa Rican football coach, general manager and retired player who played for Club Sport Herediano.

== Club career ==
In Costa Rica, Soto has only played for Herediano, where he is considered an idol by local fans. He left the club for a 10-year spell in the Mexican premier league, and played for teams such as Puebla (three stints), Monarcas Morelia (twice), Atlas, Pachuca and Tecos UAG.

In summer 2006, Soto joined Major League Soccer outfit Real Salt Lake and after several months in Salt Lake, Soto went back to his country Costa Rica, where he returned at Herediano as captain of this team. He announced his retirement in November 2008 and he played his final game was played on 17 January 2009 against Brujas where he scored a goal in the 19th minute that made Herediano win the match 1–0. He was substituted after scoring the goal.

== International career ==
Soto played in the U-20 Football World Youth Championship held in Qatar in 1995.

He made his senior debut for Costa Rica in a January 1994 friendly match against Norway and earned a total of 63 caps, scoring 10 goals. He represented his country in 21 FIFA World Cup qualification matches but injuries and bad luck came his way and denied him of playing in the 2002 FIFA World Cup. He played at the 1999, 2001 UNCAF Nations Cups and 2005 UNCAF Nations Cups as well as at the 2000 and 2005 CONCACAF Gold Cups and the 1997 Copa América.

His final international was an October 2005 FIFA World Cup qualification match against Guatemala.

== Managerial career ==
In September 2011, Soto became Herediano's administrative manager. In May 2012 he took charge at Pérez Zeledón, only to leave them in August that year to take over at the Costa Rica U20s. In 2013, he became sports director of Herediano.

In August 2014, Soto returned at the helm at Herediano.

== Career statistics ==
Appearances and goals by national team and year
National team	Year	Apps	Goals
Costa Rica	1994	2	0
Costa Rica	1995	3	1
Costa Rica	1996	3	0
Costa Rica	1997	9	1
Costa Rica	1999	6	1
Costa Rica	2000	11	4
Costa Rica	2001	6	1
Costa Rica	2002	1	0
Costa Rica	2003	3	0
Costa Rica	2004	1	0
Costa Rica	2005	18	2
Total		63	10

Scores and results list Costa Rica's goal tally first, score column indicates score after each Soto goal.

List of international goals scored by Jafet Soto
No.	Date	Venue	Opponent	Score	Result	Competition	Ref.
1	28 May 1995	Tampa Stadium, Tampa, United States	United States	2–1	2–1	Friendly	
2	9 November 1997	Estadio Azteca, Mexico City, Mexico	Mexico	2–3	3–3	1998 FIFA World Cup qualification	
3	17 March 1999	Estadio Nacional, San José, Costa Rica	Belize	5–0	7–0	1999 UNCAF Nations Cup	
4	26 January 2000	Estadio Ricardo Saprissa Aymá, San Juan de Tibás, Costa Rica	Trinidad and Tobago	2–1	2–1	Friendly	
5	13 February 2000	San Diego Stadium, San Diego, United States	Canada	1–0	2–2	2000 CONCACAF Gold Cup	
6	9 July 2000	Estadio Ricardo Saprissa Aymá, San Juan de Tibás, Costa Rica	Saint Vincent and the Grenadines	7–1	7–1	Friendly	
7	3 September 2000	Estadio Ricardo Saprissa Aymá, San Juan de Tibás, Costa Rica	Barbados	1–0	3–0	2002 FIFA World Cup qualification	
8	6 January 2001	Miami Orange Bowl, Miami, United States	Guatemala	5–1	5–2	2002 FIFA World Cup qualification	
9	7 July 2005	Qwest Field, Seattle, United States	Canada	1–0	1–0	2005 CONCACAF Gold Cup	
10	9 July 2005	Qwest Field, Seattle, United States	Cuba	2–1	3–1	2005 CONCACAF Gold Cup	

== Honours ==
Individual

- CONCACAF Gold Cup Best XI (Honorable Mention): 2005
