= Jhonny Cubero =

Costa Rican footballer (born 1976)

Personal information
- Full name: Jhonny Cubero Quesada
- Date of birth: February 23, 1976 (age 50)
- Place of birth: Grecia, Costa Rica
- Height: 1.75 m (5 ft 9 in)
- Position: Striker

Team information
- Current team: Coatepeque

Youth career
- Pococí 2000

Senior career*
Years	Team	Apps	(Gls)
1996–1997	Puntarenas	18	(6)
1997–2001	Alajuelense	66	(28)
2001–2002	→ San Carlos (loan)	33	(19)
2002	Alajuelense	2	(0)
2003–2006	Comunicaciones		(49)
2006–2010	Xelajú		
2010	Santos de Guápiles	6	(2)
2010–2012	Suchitepéquez		
2011	→ Mictlán (loan)	22	(7)
2012	Deportivo Ayutla		
2013	Juventud Escuintleca	16	(3)
2013–2014	Coatepeque	13	(1)

International career^{‡}
2005–2007	Costa Rica	5	(0)
- * Club domestic league appearances and goals ‡ National team caps and goals as of October 16, 2008

Jhonny Cubero Quesada (born 23 March 1976 in Grecia) is a Costa Rican professional footballer who last played for Coatepeque in Guatemala.

== Club career ==
A much-travelled forward, Cubero made his professional debut on 23 March 1996 for Puntarenas against Municipal Goicochea and spent the first seasons of his career at Costa Rican sides Puntarenas, Alajuelense and San Carlos for whom he scored 19 in the 2002 season before moving abroad to play in Guatemala for over 10 years. He won the 2007 Clausura title with Xelajú.

In June 2010 Cubero returned to his native Costa Rica but in September 2010 he was released by Santos de Guápiles for alleged indiscipline. He then returned to Guatemala and was snapped up by Suchitepéquez.

In August 2012 he signed for Guatemalan second division side Deportivo Ayutla, he joined Juventud Escuintleca for the 2013 Clausura and moved to Coatepeque in September 2013.

== International career ==
Cubero has made five appearances for the Costa Rica national football team, his debut coming in a friendly against Ecuador on February 16, 2005. He made two substitute appearances at the UNCAF Nations Cup 2005 and two substitute appearances at the 2007 CONCACAF Gold Cup.

== Personal life ==
Cubero is a son of former Costa Rican international José Pepe Cubero. He has become a Guatemalan citizen.
