= Éver Alfaro =

Costa Rican footballer (born 1982)

Ever Alfaro
Personal information
- Full name: Ever Alfaro Víquez
- Date of birth: 1 October 1982 (age 44)
- Place of birth: Grecia, Costa Rica
- Height: 1.81 m (5 ft 11 1/2 in)
- Position: Striker

Senior career*
Years	Team	Apps	(Gls)
2003–2005	Pérez Zeledón	32	(13)
2005–2006	Herediano	20	(3)
2006–2008	Deportivo Saprissa	34	(4)
2009–2010	UCR	34	(6)
2010	Pérez Zeledón	16	(10)
2011	Atlante	6	(1)
2011–2013	Belén Siglo XXI	20	(5)
2012	Mérida	22	(6)
2013	Carmelita	6	(1)

International career
2005–2010	Costa Rica	6	(1)
- * Club domestic league appearances and goals as of 27 July 2012

Ever Alfaro Víquez (born 1 October 1982) is a Costa Rican professional footballer, who most recently played for Carmelita.

== Club career ==
Alfaro made his professional debut with Municipal Pérez Zeledón and played for Herediano, before having a slow start with Saprissa after a delayed transfer from Herediano with his season ending with a major knee injury.

He moved abroad in January 2011 to play for Mexican side Atlante and later played for Mérida before returning home to join Carmelita.

== International career ==
As of January 2014, Alfaro has made 6 appearances for the Costa Rica national football team, his debut coming in a friendly against Ecuador on 16 February 2005 immediately scoring his first international goal as well. He appeared in three matches as Costa Rica won the UNCAF Nations Cup 2005 tournament.

His final international was an October 2010 friendly match against El Salvador.

=== International goals ===
Scores and results list Honduras' goal tally first.

N.	Date	Venue	Opponent	Score	Result	Competition
1.	16 February 2005	Estadio Eladio Rosabal Cordero, Heredia, Costa Rica	Ecuador	1–0	1–2	Friendly match
