= Danny Fonseca =

Costa Rican footballer (born 1979)

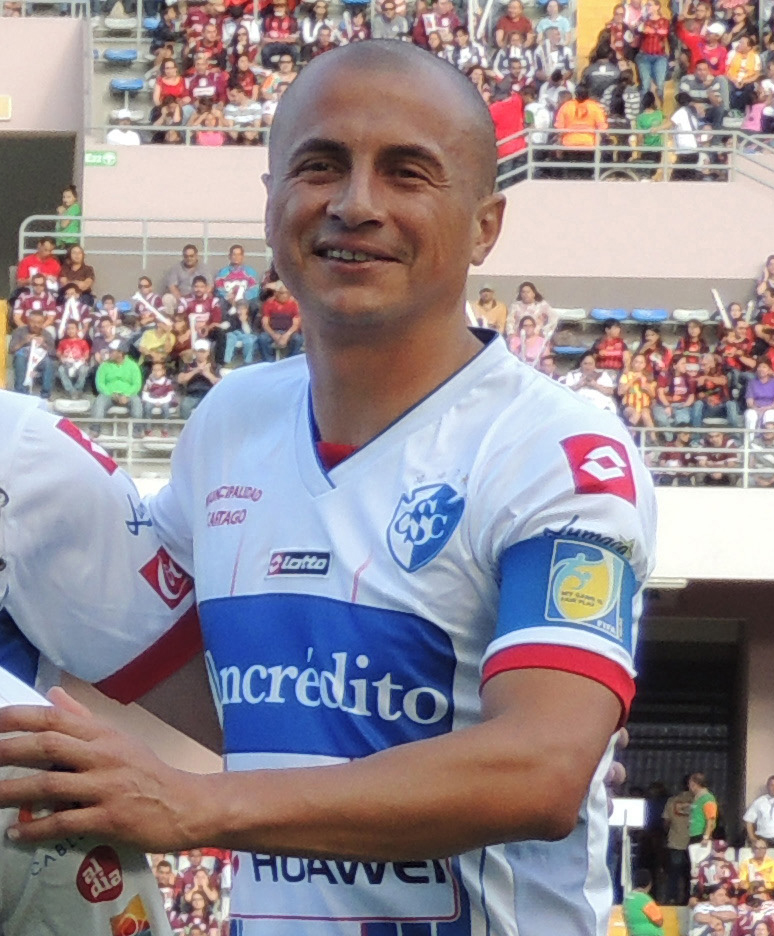

Personal information
- Full name: Danny Alberto Fonseca Bravo
- Date of birth: 7 November 1979 (age 46)
- Place of birth: Cartago, Costa Rica
- Height: 1.79 m (5 ft 10 1/2 in)
- Position: Defensive midfielder

Team information
- Current team: Cartaginés (assistant coach)

Youth career
- Municipal Paraíso

Senior career*
Years	Team	Apps	(Gls)
1998–2006	Cartaginés	273	(35)
2006–2009	Brujas	116	(9)
2010–2018	Cartaginés	264	(14)
Total		653	(58)

International career
2003–2008	Costa Rica	28	(2)

Managerial career
- 2018–2021: Cartaginés (assistant)
- 2021: Cartaginés (caretaker)
- 2024–: Cartaginés (assistant)
- 2024–: Cartaginés (U20)
- * Club domestic league appearances and goals

Danny Alberto Fonseca Bravo (born 7 November 1979) is a Costa Rican professional football coach and a former midfielder. He is an assistant coach with Cartaginés.

== Club career ==
A native of Cartago, Fonseca played the majority of his career at local side Cartaginés. In February 2013 he tied club legend Leonel Hernández for most league games played for the club, with 360. He also had a few seasons at Brujas, but returned to Cartaginés in May 2010.

In October 2013, Fonseca reached 500 league games in the Costa Rican Primera División, the 14th player in the league history to do so.

== International career ==
Fonseca played at the 1999 FIFA World Youth Championship held in Nigeria.

He made his senior debut for Costa Rica in a February 2003 UNCAF Nations Cup match against Honduras and collected a total of 28 caps, scoring 2 goals. He represented his country in 4 FIFA World Cup qualification matches and was selected as a member of the Costa Rica squad at the 2006 FIFA World Cup finals. He was the first player to be booked in the FIFA World Cup 2006 during his country's 4–2 defeat to Germany. Also he played at the 2003 and 2005 UNCAF Nations Cups as well as at the 2005 CONCACAF Gold Cup. He was a non-playing squad member at the 2004 Copa América.

His final international was a January 2008 friendly match 1994 against Iran.

=== International goals ===
Scores and results list Costa Rica's goal tally first.

N.	Date	Venue	Opponent	Score	Result	Competition
1.	9 November 2005	Stade d'Honneur de Dillon, Fort-de-France, Martinique	France	2–0	2–3	Friendly match
2.	1 March 2006	Azadi Stadium, Teheran, Iran	Iran	2–3	2–3	Friendly match
