= 2005 UNCAF Nations Cup =

Tournament details
- Host country: Guatemala
- Teams: 7 (from 1 sub-confederation)

Final positions
- Champions: Costa Rica (5th title)
- Runners-up: Honduras
- Third place: Guatemala
- Fourth place: Panama

Tournament statistics
- Matches played: 13
- Goals scored: 34 (2.62 per match)
- Top scorer(s): (Honduras) Wilmer Velásquez (6 goals)

The eighth edition of the bi-annual UNCAF Nations Cup was held in Guatemala, from February 19 to 27, 2005. All matches were played at the Estadio Mateo Flores in Guatemala City. The four semifinalists qualified for 2005 CONCACAF Gold Cup.

== Participating teams ==
7 UNCAF teams participated in the tournament

- Belize
- Costa Rica (Defending Champions)
- El Salvador
- Guatemala (Hosts)
- Honduras
- Nicaragua
- Panama

== Squads ==
For a complete list of all participating squads see UNCAF Nations Cup 2005 squads

== Venue ==
Guatemala City
Estadio Mateo Flores
Capacity: 26,000
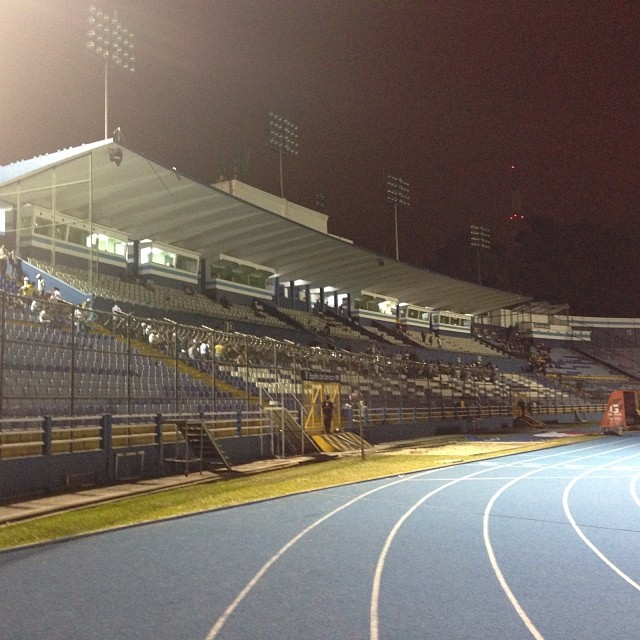

== First round ==
=== Group A ===
Pos	Team	Pld	W	D	L	GF	GA	GD	Pts	Qualification
1	Honduras	3	2	1	0	10	2	+8	7	Qualified to semifinals
2	Guatemala	3	2	1	0	7	1	+6	7	Qualified to semifinals
3	Nicaragua	3	1	0	2	2	9	−7	3	
4	Belize	3	0	0	3	0	7	−7	0	

19 February 2005
(UTC−06:00)

Honduras	5–1	Nicaragua
Núñez 19', 84'; Velásquez 42', 51', 73'		Bustos 54'

Estadio Mateo Flores, Guatemala City
Attendance: 5,306
Referee: Roberto Moreno (PAN)
19 February 2005
(UTC−06:00)

Guatemala	2–0	Belize
Villatoro 35'; Plata 72' (pen.)

Estadio Mateo Flores, Guatemala City
Attendance: 10,000
Referee: Wálter Quesada (CRC)

21 February 2005
(UTC−06:00)

Belize	0–4	Honduras
		Velásquez 7'; Núñez 33', 80'; Palacios 88'

Estadio Mateo Flores, Guatemala City
Attendance: 3,000
Referee: Donald Campos (NCA)
21 February 2005
(UTC−06:00)

Guatemala	4–0	Nicaragua
Plata 11'; Sandoval 30', 77'; Villatoro 66'

Estadio Mateo Flores, Guatemala City
Attendance: 8,000
Referee: Rodolfo Sibrián (SLV)

23 February 2005
(UTC−06:00)

Belize	0–1	Nicaragua
		Vílchez 85'

Estadio Mateo Flores, Guatemala City
Attendance: 3,000
Referee: Wálter Quesada (CRC)
23 February 2005
(UTC−06:00)

Guatemala	1–1	Honduras
Romero 22'		Velásquez 72'

Estadio Mateo Flores, Guatemala City
Attendance: 3,000
Referee: Roberto Moreno (PAN)

=== Group B ===
Pos	Team	Pld	W	D	L	GF	GA	GD	Pts	Qualification
1	Costa Rica	2	2	0	0	3	1	+2	6	Qualified to semifinals
2	Panama	2	1	0	1	1	1	0	3	Qualified to semifinals
3	El Salvador	2	0	0	2	1	3	−2	0	

19 February 2005
(UTC−06:00)

El Salvador	0–1	Panama
		Solís 77'

Estadio Mateo Flores, Guatemala City
Attendance: 10,000
Referee: Benito Archundia (MEX)

21 February 2005
(UTC−06:00)

Costa Rica	2–1	El Salvador
Wilson 75'; Myrie 90+1'		Alas 40'

Estadio Mateo Flores, Guatemala City
Attendance: 3,000
Referee: Carlos Batres (GUA)

23 February 2005
(UTC−06:00)

Costa Rica	1–0	Panama
Myrie 81'

Estadio Mateo Flores, Guatemala City
Attendance: 3,000
Referee: Benito Archundia (MEX)

== Knockout stage ==
Semi-finals
February 25 - Guatemala City
Honduras	1
Panama	0
February 25 - Guatemala City
Costa Rica	4
Guatemala	0

Final
February 27 - Guatemala City
Honduras	1 (6)
Costa Rica	1 (7)
Third place
February 27 - Guatemala City
Panama	0
Guatemala	3

=== Semifinals ===
25 February 2005
(UTC−06:00)

Honduras	1–0	Panama
Velásquez 72'

Estadio Mateo Flores, Guatemala City
Attendance: 11,159
Referee: Rodolfo Sibrián (SLV)

25 February 2005
(UTC−06:00)

Guatemala	0–4	Costa Rica
		Segura 8'; Sequeira 22'; Wilson 42'; Scott 61'

Estadio Mateo Flores, Guatemala City
Attendance: 11,159
Referee: Benito Archundia (MEX)

=== Third place match ===
27 February 2005
(UTC−06:00)

Guatemala	3–0	Panama
Villatoro 7'; Plata 41', 49'

Estadio Mateo Flores, Guatemala City
Attendance: 1,491
Referee: Wálter Quesada (CRC)

=== Final ===
27 February 2005
(UTC−06:00)

Costa Rica	1–1 (a.e.t)	Honduras
Wilson 68'		Núñez 58'
Penalties
Soto (penalty missed); Alfaro (penalty scored); Wilson (penalty scored); Cubero (penalty scored); Sequeira (penalty scored); Fonseca (penalty scored); Díaz (penalty scored); Umaña (penalty scored)	7–6	(penalty scored) Velásquez; (penalty scored) López; (penalty scored) Mendoza; (penalty missed) Berríos; (penalty scored) Núñez; (penalty scored) Guerrero; (penalty scored) Reyes; (penalty missed) Vallecillo

Estadio Mateo Flores, Guatemala City
Attendance: 1,491
Referee: Carlos Batres (GUA)

Costa Rica	Honduras

GK	18	José Porras
DF	3	Michael Umaña
DF	6	Danny Fonseca
DF	8	Berny Peña
DF	15	Júnior Díaz	(yellow card) 60'
DF	19	Roy Myrie
DF	20	Douglas Sequeira
MF	10	Alonso Solís	(substituted off) 59'
MF	13	Géiner Segura	(substituted off) 65'
FW	21	Whayne Wilson
FW	22	Erick Scott	(substituted off) 90'
Substitutions:
MF	11	Jafet Soto	(substituted in) 59'	(yellow card) 75'
FW	7	Jhonny Cubero	(substituted in) 65'	(yellow card) 89'
FW	17	Éver Alfaro	(substituted in) 90'
Manager:
(Colombia) Jorge Pinto

GK	1	Víctor Coello
DF	6	Sergio Mendoza
DF	15	Darwin Pacheco
DF	17	Érick Vallecillo
DF	23	Iván Guerrero
MF	8	Wilson Palacios	(substituted off) 68'
MF	13	Dennis Ferrera
MF	16	Walter López
MF	19	Mario Berríos
FW	10	Wilmer Velásquez
FW	11	Milton Núñez
Substitutions:
DF	5	Milton Reyes	(substituted in) 68'
Manager:
(Honduras) José Herrera

== Awards ==
2005 UNCAF Nations Cup winner

Costa Rica
Fifth title

== Goalscorers ==
6 goals

- (Honduras) Wilmer Velásquez

5 goals

- (Honduras) Milton Núñez

4 goals

- (Guatemala) Juan Carlos Plata

3 goals

- (Guatemala) Edwin Villatoro
- (Costa Rica) Whayne Wilson

2 goals

- (Costa Rica) Roy Myrie
- (Guatemala) Hernán Sandoval

1 goal

- (Costa Rica) Erick Scott
- (Costa Rica) Géiner Segura
- (Costa Rica) Douglas Sequeira
- (El Salvador) Dennis Alas
- (Guatemala) Gonzalo Romero
- (Nicaragua) Milton Bustos
- (Nicaragua) Juan Vílchez
- (Panama) Juan Ramón Solís
