= Municipal Pérez Zeledón =

Costa Rican football club

Pérez Zeledón
- Full name: Asociación Deportiva Municipal de Pérez Zeledón
- Nicknames: Guerreros del Sur (Southern Warriors)
- Founded: 1991; 35 years ago
- Ground: Estadio Municipal Pérez Zeledón; San Isidro de El General, Costa Rica
- Capacity: 6,000
- Chairman: Juan Luis Artavia
- Manager: Luis Orozco
- League: Liga Promerica
- Clausura 2023: 9°
- Website: www.municipalpz.net
Home colours	Away colours	Third colours

Asociación Deportiva Municipal de Pérez Zeledón is a Costa Rican football team playing at the top level in the Primera División de Costa Rica.

It is based in San Isidro de El General. Their home stadium is Estadio Municipal Pérez Zeledón. Their nickname is Guerreros del Sur or The Southern Warriors.

== History ==
Municipal Pérez Zeledón was founded in 1962 and they reached the Second Division in 1976.

=== A.D. Generaleña and A.D. Pérez Zeledón merger ===
In 1988, Asociación Deportiva Municipal Generaleña won promotion to the Primera Division and in 1991 a second team from Pérez Zeledón, Asociación Deportiva Pérez Zeledón, also clinched the second division title, prompting to merge the teams into Asociación Deportiva Municipal de Pérez Zeledón which would go and represent the canton in the top tier. In 2010, Puma Generaleña was founded as successor to AD Generaleña.

=== 2004 Apertura champions ===
The team were surprise winners of the 2004–05 Apertura in the Primera División, their first and only title so far, under the coaching of Carlos Restrepo against Saprissa defeated them on their own home stadium 0–1. Although, they missed out on the overall championship title, losing against Alajuelense 1–4 on aggregate. The club's top goalscorer that season was Ever Alfaro. Also in the team were William Sunsing and Géiner Segura, who were both part of the Ticos along their path to 2006's World Cup held in Germany.

== Honours ==
- Primera División de Costa Rica
  - Champions (1): Apertura 2017

== Current squad ==
As of 6 April, 2026

Note: Flags indicate national team as defined under FIFA eligibility rules; some limited exceptions apply. Players may hold more than one non-FIFA nationality.

No.	Pos.	Nation	Player
1	GK	CRC	Bryan Segura
4	DF	CRC	Rawy Rodríguez (on loan from Carmelita)
5	DF	CRC	William Fernández
6	DF	CRC	Luis José Hernández
7	MF	CRC	Rodrigo Garita
8	MF	CRC	José Mora
10	MF	CRC	Silvio Rodríguez
11	DF	CRC	Barlon Sequeira
12	MF	CRC	Kendall Porras
14	MF	CRC	Gustavo Méndez
15	MF	CRC	Alejandro Porras
16	DF	CRC	Kenneth Carvajal
17	FW	CRC	Andrey Soto
19	FW	ARG	Máximo Pereira

No.	Pos.	Nation	Player
20	FW	CRC	Royner Rojas
21	MF	CRC	Pablo Gamboa
23	DF	URU	Joaquin Aguirre
25	DF	SLV	Adán Clímaco
26	MF	CRC	Ethan Drummond
27	MF	CRC	Allan Fallas
28	DF	MEX	Eduardo Pastrana
30	DF	CRC	Jefferson Rivera
31	DF	CRC	Keral Ríos
32	MF	HON	Joshua Canales
33	FW	PAN	Manuel Morán
93	DF	CRC	Mauricio Núñez
99	GK	CRC	Miguel Ajú

=== Out on loan ===
Note: Flags indicate national team as defined under FIFA eligibility rules; some limited exceptions apply. Players may hold more than one non-FIFA nationality.

No. / Pos. / Nation / Player; — / MF / CRC / Anderson Barboza (at Jicaral until 30 June 2025)	No. / Pos. / Nation / Player; — / MF / CRC / Aarón Fallas (at Jicaral until 30 June 2025)

== Championship Apertura 2017 ==
List of players and coaching staff who won the Apertura 2017 National Soccer Championship of Costa Rica First Division, by defeating Club Sport Herediano on December 20, 2017.

Note: Flags indicate national team as defined under FIFA eligibility rules; some limited exceptions apply. Players may hold more than one non-FIFA nationality.

No.	Pos.	Nation	Player
1	GK	ARG	Luis Aseff
3	DF	CRC	Porfirio López Meza
5	DF	CRC	Dave Myrie Medrano
6	MF	CRC	Jeikel Venegas McCarthy
7	MF	CRC	Juan Gabriel Guzmán Otarola
8	MF	CRC	Fabián Garita
9	FW	CRC	Frank Zamora
10	MF	CRC	Esyin Cordero
11	MF	CRC	Anthony López Muñoz
12	FW	CRC	Josué Mitchell Omier
13	GK	CRC	Guido Jiménez López
15	DF	CRC	César Carrillo Madrigal
16	MF	CRC	Anthony Mata Flores

No.	Pos.	Nation	Player
17	FW	CRC	Josué Martínez Arias
21	DF	CRC	Keilor Soto Vega (Captain)
22	MF	ARG	Milton Martínez
23	DF	CRC	Mauricio Núñez Morales
24	MF	CRC	Luis Carlos Barrantes Campos
25	MF	CRC	Fernando Monge
26	GK	CRC	Bryan Segura Cruz
27	FW	CRC	Warren Cordero
28	MF	ARG	Pablo Azcurra
29	FW	PAR	Lauro Cazal
33	MF	CRC	Álvaro Sánchez Álfaro
61	MF	CRC	Carlos Hernández Valverde
77	DF	CRC	Kevin Sancho Ramos

=== Coaching staff ===
- Coach - José Giacone Garita
- Attached - Omar Royero Gutiérrez & José Carlos Cancela Durán
- Goalkeepers - Giovanny Chacón Obando
- Physio - Andres Mata Leiva
- Doctor - William Cruz Umaña
- Props - Melvin Bonilla Villalobos
