= 2011–12 Costa Rican Primera División season =

2011–12 Campeonato Nacional de Costa Rica
- Season: 2011–12
- Champions: Alajuelense (2011 Invierno); Herediano (2012 Verano)
- Relegated: TBD
- Champions League: Alajuelense; Herediano
- Matches played: 116
- Goals scored: 321 (2.77 per match)
- Top goalscorer: Invierno: Randall Brenes (13); Verano: TBD
- Biggest home win: Invierno: Pérez Zeledón 7–1 Puntarenas
- Biggest away win: Invierno: San Carlos 0–4 Herediano
- Highest scoring: Invierno: Herediano 6–3 Cartaginés

The 2011–12 Primera División season is the 93rd of Costa Rica's top-flight professional football league. The season was divided into two championships: the Invierno and the Verano. The season began on 31 July 2011.

== Promotion and relegation ==
Universidad de Costa Rica finished last season in last place in the overall table at the end of last season and were relegated to the Segunda División. Replacing them in the league for this season are the overall champions of last season's Segunda División competition, Belén Siglo XXI.

Barrio México were expelled from last year's competition during the 2011 Verano tournament and were eventually relegated from the league due to various financial difficulties. They were not replaced for this season.

For this season, Brujas changed their name to Orión FC Desamparados.

== Format changes ==
Due to the reduction of the league to 11 teams for this season, the league's format was changed for this season. There would be no groups this season. Instead, for both tournaments, the clubs would play every other club twice, once at home and once away, for a total of 20 matches each. At the end of the regular season, the top 4 teams in the league standings would participate in the playoffs. At the end of the season, the last place club would participate in a promotion-relegation playoff against the Segunda División overall runners-up, while the Segunda División overall champions would be promoted to next season's competition automatically.

== Average attendance ==
- Saprissa 14,990
- Alajuelense 9,720
- Herediano 4,064
- Limón 3,220
- Cartaginés 3,090
- Santos de Guápiles 2,058
- San Carlos 2,109
- Puntarenas 2,027
- Pérez Zeledón 1,119
- Belén 1,117
- Orión 544

== Team information ==
Team	Manager	City	Stadium	Capacity
LD Alajuelense	(Costa Rica) Oscar "El Machillo" Ramírez	Alajuela	Alejandro Morera Soto	17,895
Belén Siglo XXI	(Costa Rica) Vinicio Alvarado	Belén	Estadio Polideportivo de Belén	3,000
C.S. Cartaginés	(Costa Rica) Jhonny Chávez	Cartago	Fello Meza	13,500
CS Herediano	(Costa Rica) Jafet Soto	Heredia	Rosabal Cordero	8,144
Limón F.C.	(Uruguay) Hernán Fernando Sossa	Limón	Estadio Nuevo de Limón/Estadio Juan Gobán	3,000/2,000
Orión F.C.	(Uruguay) Martín Arreola	Tarrazú	Estadio Municipal de Tarrazú	1,500
Municipal Pérez Zeledón	(Costa Rica) Mauricio Wright	San Isidro	Municipal	6,000
Puntarenas FC	(Costa Rica) Luis Fernando Fallas	Puntarenas	"Lito" Pérez	4,105
Asociación Deportiva San Carlos	(Costa Rica) Marvin Solano	Ciudad Quesada	Carlos Álvarez	5,600
Santos de Guápiles	(Argentina) Gustavo Martínez	Guápiles	Ebal Rodríguez	3,000
Deportivo Saprissa	(Costa Rica) Alexander Guimaraes	Tibás	Ricardo Saprissa	23,000

== Campeonato de Invierno ==
The 2011 Campeonato de Invierno, officially the 2011 Campeonato de Invierno Scotiabank for sponsorship reasons, was the first tournament of the season. The tournament began on 31 July 2011 and ended on 18 December 2011.

=== First stage ===
==== Standings ====
Pos	Team	Pld	W	D	L	GF	GA	GD	Pts	Qualification
1	Herediano	20	11	6	3	39	19	+20	39	Advances to the Semifinals
2	Alajuelense	20	11	4	5	38	23	+15	37	Advances to the Semifinals
3	Deportivo Saprissa	20	9	8	3	34	21	+13	35	Advances to the Semifinals
4	Cartaginés	20	7	9	4	31	27	+4	30	Advances to the Semifinals
5	Puntarenas	20	7	7	6	27	34	−7	28	
6	Pérez Zeledón	20	7	5	8	31	30	+1	26	
7	Santos	20	6	7	7	26	27	−1	25	
8	San Carlos	20	5	6	9	22	33	−11	21	
9	Belén	20	4	7	9	21	30	−9	19	
10	Limón	20	5	4	11	19	30	−11	19	
11	Orión	20	4	5	11	20	34	−14	17	

Rules for classification: 1) points; 2) goal difference; 3) number of goals scored.

==== Results ====
Home \ Away	ALA	BEL	CAR	HER	LIM	ORI	PEZ	PUN	SAC	SAN	SAP
Alajuelense		1–0	4–0	2–2	0–2	4–2	4–0	0–1	3–1	0–2	1–1
Belén	1–2		1–1	1–2	3–1	1–1	1–3	1–0	1–1	3–0	1–1
Cartaginés	2–0	3–2		3–1	3–0	3–1	2–2	3–0	0–0	1–1	2–1
Herediano	4–0	1–1	6–3		1–1	1–0	2–1	3–1	5–0	1–0	1–1
Limón	0–2	2–1	1–1	1–2		3–2	1–0	3–3	0–1	0–2	0–2
Orión	1–1	3–1	0–0	0–1	1–0		0–1	0–0	1–0	1–3	1–4
Pérez Zeledón	1–3	0–1	0–0	2–1	1–1	5–1		7–1	1–0	2–1	2–2
Puntarenas	1–3	3–0	2–1	1–1	1–0	2–1	3–2		2–0	2–2	3–3
San Carlos	0–3	4–0	1–1	0–4	2–1	2–2	3–0	0–0		3–1	1–4
Santos	0–3	1–1	1–1	0–0	2–1	1–2	1–1	3–0	2–2		3–2
Deportivo Saprissa	2–2	0–0	3–1	1–0	0–1	1–0	2–0	1–1	2–1	1–0	

Legend: Blue = home team win; Yellow = draw; Red = away team win.

=== Second stage ===
Semifinals
1	Herediano	2	1	3
4	Cartaginés	1	0	1
2	Alajuelense	1	2	3
3	Saprissa	0	2	2

Finals
Herediano	1	1 (5)	2
Alajuelense	1	1 (6)	2

=== Semifinals ===
==== First legs ====
27 November 2011
11:00 UTC-6

Cartaginés	1–2	Herediano
Brenes 4'		Vargas 18'; Cordero 39'

Estadio José Rafael Fello Meza Ivankovich, Cartago

27 November 2011
16:00 UTC-6

Saprissa	0–1	Alajuelense
		Alpizar 71'

Estadio Ricardo Saprissa Aymá, San Juan de Tibás

==== Second legs ====
4 December 2011
22:00 UTC-6

Herediano	1–0	Cartaginés
Vargas 37'

Estadio Eladio Rosabal Cordero, Heredia

4 December 2011
12:30 UTC-6

Alajuelense	2–2	Saprissa
Alpizar 37'; Fernández 90'		Ortiz 39'; Martínez 50'

Estadio Alejandro Morera Soto, Alajuela

=== Finals ===
==== First leg ====
11 December 2011
12:00 UTC-6

Alajuelense	1–1	Herediano
Alpízar 33'		Cordero 46'

Estadio Alejandro Morera Soto, Alajuela

==== Second leg ====
18 December 2011
22:00 UTC-6

Herediano	1 – 1 (a.e.t.)	Alajuelense
Cordero 73'		Sarvas 56'
Penalties
	5–6

Estadio Eladio Rosabal Cordero, Heredia

2–2 on aggregate score, Alajuelense wins on penalties 6–5

Campeonato de Invierno Scotiabank champion
Alajuelense
27th title

== Top goalscorers ==
Rank	Player	Club	Goals
1	Randall Brenes	Cartaginés	13
2	Jairo Arrieta	Saprissa	12
4	José Luis Cordero	Herediano	12
5	Victor Núñez	Herediano	9
6	Yendrick Ruiz	Puntarenas	8
6	Olman Vargas	Herediano	8
7	Jonathan McDonald	Alajuelense	7
7	Kenny Cunnighan	San Carlos	7
7	Alejandro Castro	Santos	7
8	Ismael Gómez	Limón	6
8	Alejandro Alpízar	Alajuelense	6
8	Luciano Bostal	Pérez Zeledón	6
8	Josué Martínez	Saprissa	6
9	José Cancela	Herediano	5
9	Álvaro Sánchez	San Carlos	5
9	Diego Joaquín País	San Carlos	5

== Campeonato de Verano ==
The 2012 Campeonato de Verano began on 15 January 2012 and ended in May 2012.

=== First stage ===
==== Standings ====
Pos	Team	Pld	W	D	L	GF	GA	GD	Pts	Qualification
1	Pérez Zeledón	20	11	4	5	38	25	+13	37	Advances to the Semifinals
2	Santos	20	12	1	7	32	28	+4	37	Advances to the Semifinals
3	Deportivo Saprissa	20	10	6	4	38	23	+15	36	Advances to the Semifinals
4	Herediano	20	10	4	6	33	20	+13	34	Advances to the Semifinals
5	Alajuelense	20	10	3	7	34	25	+9	33	
6	Cartaginés	20	10	3	7	33	30	+3	33	
7	San Carlos	20	8	5	7	23	25	−2	29	
8	Belén	20	7	7	6	35	28	+7	28	
9	Puntarenas	20	5	3	12	23	35	−12	18	
10	Limón	20	4	4	12	18	37	−19	16	
11	Orión	20	2	2	16	12	42	−30	8	

Updated to match(es) played on 24 April 2012. Source: Posiciones – Unafut.com
Rules for classification: 1) points; 2) goal difference; 3) number of goals scored.

==== Results ====
Home \ Away	ALA	BEL	CAR	HER	LIM	ORI	PEZ	PUN	SAC	SAN	SAP
Alajuelense		1–1	0–1	2–0	3–1	2–0	1–1	2–0	1–2	2–0	1–2
Belén	4–2		1–0	3–3	7–0	1–0	2–1	2–0	1–1	1–1	2–4
Cartaginés	2–2	3–2		2–1	3–0	2–0	0–2	3–2	0–0	5–1	1–3
Herediano	2–3	2–1	3–0		3–2	4–0	1–1	2–0	2–0	1–2	0–0
Limón	0–2	0–0	1–0	0–2		3–2	2–2	2–0	0–1	1–2	1–1
Orión	0–2	2–2	0–1	0–2	1–0		1–3	2–1	1–1	0–3	1–5
Pérez Zeledón	2–4	2–1	2–3	0–0	1–0	4–1		3–2	2–0	3–1	1–0
Puntarenas	1–0	4–1	2–2	1–2	3–1	2–1	0–3		0–0	0–2	1–1
San Carlos	3–1	0–3	1–3	1–0	0–1	1–0	2–1	2–1		1–3	3–4
Santos	3–1	2–0	3–2	1–0	2–1	2–0	2–1	1–2	1–3		0–1
Deportivo Saprissa	0–2	0–0	4–0	1–3	2–2	1–0	2–3	3–1	1–1	3–0	

Updated to match(es) played on 23 April 2012. Source: Resultados – Unafut.com
Legend: Blue = home team win; Yellow = draw; Red = away team win.

=== Second stage ===
Semifinals
1	Pérez Zeledón	1	0	1
4	Herediano	1	2	3
2	Santos	0	1	1
3	Saprissa	1	0	1

Finals
Herediano	4	2	6
Santos	2	1	3

=== Semifinals ===
==== First legs ====
28 April 2012
20:00 UTC-6

Herediano	1–1	Pérez Zeledón
Pérez 4'		Wong 69'

Estadio Eladio Rosabal Cordero
Referee: Allen Quiros

29 April 2012
11:00 UTC-6

Saprissa	1–0	Santos
Escoe 4' (penalty)

Estadio Ricardo Saprissa Aymá

==== Second legs ====
5 May 2012
20:00 UTC-6

Santos	1–0	Saprissa
Lagos 30'

Estadio Ebal Rodríguez

6 May 2012
11:00 UTC-6

Pérez Zeledón	0–2	Herediano
		Núñez 65' 80'

Estadio Municipal Pérez Zeledón
Referee: Rafael Vega

=== Finals ===
==== First leg ====
12 May 2012
20:00 UTC-6

Herediano	4–2	Santos
Cubero 47'; Núñez 71' 87'; Cancela 77'		Rodríguez 24'; Porras 51'

Estadio Eladio Rosabal Cordero
Referee: Walter Quesada

==== Second leg ====
19 May 2012
19:00 UTC-6

Santos	1–2	Herediano
Lagos 36'		Cancela 44'; Núñez 92'

Estadio Ebal Rodríguez

Campeonato de Verano Scotiabank champion
Herediano
22nd title

== Aggregate table ==
Pos	Team	Pld	W	D	L	GF	GA	GD	Pts	Qualification
1	Herediano	40	21	10	9	72	39	+33	73	Qualification for 2012–13 CONCACAF Champions League Group Stage
2	Deportivo Saprissa	40	19	14	7	72	44	+28	71	
3	Alajuelense	40	21	7	12	72	48	+24	70	Qualification for 2012–13 CONCACAF Champions League Group Stage
4	Pérez Zeledón	40	18	9	13	68	54	+14	63	
5	Cartaginés	40	17	12	11	64	57	+7	63	
6	Santos	40	18	8	14	58	55	+3	62	
7	San Carlos	40	13	11	16	45	59	−14	50	
8	Belén	40	11	14	15	55	57	−2	47	
9	Puntarenas	40	12	10	18	50	69	−19	46	
10	Limón	40	9	8	23	37	67	−30	35	
11	Orión	40	6	7	27	32	76	−44	25	Promotion-relegation playoff

Updated to match(es) played on 24 April 2012. Source: Posiciones – Unafut.com (Tabla de posiciones General Acumulada 2011–2012)
Rules for classification: 1) points; 2) goal difference; 3) number of goals scored.
