= 2009–10 Costa Rican Primera División season =

Campeonato Scotiabank
- Season: 2009–10
- Champions: Invierno: Brujas (1st title); Verano: Saprissa (29th title)
- Relegated: Ramonense
- Champions League: Brujas; Saprissa

The 2009–10 Primera División season is the 91st of Costa Rica's top-flight professional football league. The season began on July 25 and ended on May 16. The season was divided into two championships: the Invierno and the Verano

== Format ==
The format for both championships are similar. Each championship will have two stages: a first "regular" stage and a second "playoff" stage. Prior to the start of the season, the twelve teams were designated into groups based on their positions in the 2008-09 aggregate table. The teams that finished 1, 4, 5, 8, 9, and Liga de Ascenso winner were placed into Group A. The teams that finished in 2, 3, 6, 7, 10, and 11 were placed into Group B.

The first stage was divided into two rounds: the first round for each championship had a single round-robin format; the second round for championship is different. The second round in the Invierno had the teams in each group play against each in a single round-robin format. The second round for the Verano will have the teams from each group play the teams in the other group in a single round-robin format. The top three teams from each group at the end of the stage will advance the second stage.

The second stage for each championship is identical: The teams that finishes 2 & 3 in their groups will play against the opposite seed from the other group over two legs. The winner of that tie will advance to the semifinals and play against one of the top teams from the groups. The winners of that tie will advance to the finals, which will determine the tournament champion.

== Team information ==
Team	City	Stadium	Capacity
Águilas Guanacastecas	Liberia	Edgardo Briceño	6,500
Alajuelense	Alajuela	Alejandro Morera Soto	17,895
Brujas	Desamparados	"Cuty" Monge	5,000
Cartaginés	Cartago	Fello Meza	18,000
Herediano	Heredia	Rosabal Cordero	8,144
Pérez Zeledón	San Isidro del General	Municipal	6,000
Puntarenas	Puntarenas	"Lito" Pérez	4,105
Ramonense	San Ramón	Guillermo Roldán	5,000
San Carlos	Ciudad Quesada	Carlos Álvarez	5,600
Santos de Guápiles	Guápiles	Ebal Rodríguez	3,000
Saprissa	Tibás	Ricardo Saprissa	24,000
Universidad de Costa Rica	San Pedro	Ecologico	1,800

== Campeonato de Invierno ==
The 2009 Campeonato de Invierno, officially the 2009 Campeonato de Invierno Scotiabank for sponsorship reasons, was the first tournament of the season. The tournament began on July 25, 2009, and ended on December 28, 2009.

=== First stage ===
==== Standings ====
Group 1
Pos	Team	Pld	W	D	L	GF	GA	GD	Pts	Qualification
1	Pérez Zeledón	16	8	5	3	23	20	+3	29	Advances to the Semifinals
2	Cartaginés	16	7	3	6	21	16	+5	24	Advances to the Quarterfinals
3	Liberia Mía	16	7	3	6	25	22	+3	24	Advances to the Quarterfinals
4	Saprissa	16	6	6	4	19	17	+2	24	
5	Alajuelense	16	6	5	5	21	16	+5	23	
6	Santos	16	5	6	5	14	18	−4	21	

Group 2
Pos	Team	Pld	W	D	L	GF	GA	GD	Pts	Qualification
1	Herediano	16	9	2	5	20	16	+4	29	Advances to the Semifinals
2	Brujas	16	6	5	5	19	17	+2	23	Advances to the Quarterfinals
3	Puntarenas	16	5	5	6	17	21	−4	20	Advances to the Quarterfinals
4	Universidad de Costa Rica	16	4	4	8	21	20	+1	16	
5	Ramonense	16	3	7	6	13	16	−3	16	
6	San Carlos	16	2	5	9	9	23	−14	11	

Source: RSSSF
Rules for classification: 1) points; 2) goal difference; 3) number of goals scored.

==== Results ====
Home \ Away	ALA	BRU	CAR	HER	LIB	PEZ	PUN	RAM	SAC	SAN	SAP	UCR
Alajuelense			2–1		1–1	1–2	2–0	2–1		1–1	3–0	2–1
Brujas	0–0			1–2	2–1		1–0	0–0	3–1		0–1	2–1
Cartaginés	1–0	2–0		2–1	0–1	2–3			0–1	4–0	2–1	
Herediano	1–0	2–1			1–0		2–1	2–0	2–0		1–1	1–0
Liberia Mía	3–2		2–3			4–1	3–1	2–0		1–0	1–0	1–1
Pérez Zeledón	3–3	3–2	1–0	4–1	1–1				1–0	0–0	1–1	
Puntarenas		2–2	0–0	1–0		2–0		2–1	1–1	0–0		3–2
Ramonense		0–0	2–3	0–0		3–1	1–1		0–0	0–0		2–1
San Carlos	0–0	0–2		0–2	3–1		0–2	0–0			1–2	1–1
Santos	1–0	0–0	1–0	3–1	3–2	0–1			2–1		2–2	
Saprissa	0–2		0–0		3–1	0–0	4–1	2–1		2–1		0–0
Universidad de Costa Rica		2–3	1–1	2–1		0–1	2–0	0–2	4–0	3–0		

Updated to match(es) played on unknown. Source:
Legend: Blue = home team win; Yellow = draw; Red = away team win.

=== Playoffs ===
Quarterfinals
A2	Cartaginés	1	1	2
B3	Puntarenas	2	1	3
B2	Brujas	2	3	5
A3	Liberia Mía	1	1	2

Semifinals
B1	Herediano	1	2	3
B3	Puntarenas	3	1	4
A1	Pérez Zeledón	1	1	2
B2	Brujas	2	2	4

Finals
B3	Puntarenas	0	1	1(4)
B2	Brujas	0	1	1(5)

Campeonato de Invierno Scotiabank
2009 champion
Brujas
1st title

== Campeonato de Verano ==
The 2010 Campeonato de Verano, officially the 2010 Campeonato de Verano Scotiabank for sponsorship reasons, was the second tournament of the season. The tournament began on January 17, 2010, and ended on May 2, 2010.

=== First stage ===
==== Standings ====
Group 1
Pos	Team	Pld	W	D	L	GF	GA	GD	Pts	Qualification
1	Saprissa	16	10	5	1	26	12	+14	35	Advances to the Semifinals
2	Alajuelense	16	11	1	4	19	6	+13	34	Advances to the Quarterfinals
3	Santos	16	6	2	8	18	19	−1	20	Advances to the Quarterfinals
4	Cartaginés	16	4	8	4	14	15	−1	20	
5	Pérez Zeledón	16	5	4	7	18	22	−4	19	
6	Águilas Guanacastecas	16	3	6	7	19	24	−5	15	

Group 2
Pos	Team	Pld	W	D	L	GF	GA	GD	Pts	Qualification
1	San Carlos	16	8	5	3	16	12	+4	29	Advances to the Semifinals
2	Herediano	16	5	5	6	20	22	−2	20	Advances to the Quarterfinals
3	Puntarenas	16	3	8	5	14	21	−7	17	Advances to the Quarterfinals
4	Ramonense	16	2	10	4	15	18	−3	16	
5	Universidad de Costa Rica	16	3	7	6	13	14	−1	16	
6	Brujas	16	2	7	7	11	18	−7	13	

Updated to match(es) played on April 18, 2010. Source: (in Spanish)
Rules for classification: 1) points; 2) goal difference; 3) number of goals scored.

==== Results ====
Home \ Away	AGU	ALA	BRU	CAR	HER	PEZ	PUN	RAM	SAC	SAN	SAP	UCR
Liberia Mía		1–2	0–2	0–1	2–1	5–1			1–1	2–3	2–3	
Alajuelense	3–0		2–0	2–0	1–0	1–0			1–0	1–0	1–0	
Brujas				1–1	4–2	0–0	0–0	1–1	1–2	0–2		1–1
Cartaginés	0–0	1–0				1–1	1–1	2–2		1–0	2–2	1–0
Herediano			2–0	0–0		1–3	0–0	3–3	2–1	1–0		2–1
Pérez Zeledón	2–2	1–0		3–2			2–3	2–0		1–0	1–1	0–2
Puntarenas	0–1	1–0	0–0		2–2			2–1	2–2		2–2	0–2
Ramonense	1–1	0–2	1–1		1–0		3–1		0–0		0–0	0–0
San Carlos			1–0	1–0	0–0	1–0	1–0	1–0		2–1		1–1
Santos	1–1	1–3		2–1		1–0	4–0	1–1			0–2	2–1
Saprissa	3–1	1–0	1–0	0–0	3–2	2–1			2–0	2–0		
Universidad de Costa Rica	0–0	0–0	2–0		1–2		0–0	1–1	1–2		0–2	

Updated to match(es) played on 18 April 2010. Source: (in Spanish)
Legend: Blue = home team win; Yellow = draw; Red = away team win.

=== Playoffs ===
Quarterfinals
B2	Herediano	1	1	2
A3	Santos	2	1	3
A2	Alajuelense	2	3	5
B3	Puntarenas	1	2	3

Semifinals
A1	Saprissa	1	0	1
A3	Santos	0	0	0
B1	San Carlos	1	2	3
A2	Alajuelense	1	1	2

Finals
A1	Saprissa	4	3	7
B1	San Carlos	2	0	2

Campeonato de Verano Scotiabank
2010 champion
Saprissa
29th title

== Aggregate table ==
Pos	Team	Pld	W	D	L	GF	GA	GD	Pts	Qualification or relegation
1	Saprissa	36	19	12	5	53	31	+22	69	Qualified to the 2010–11 CONCACAF Champions League Group Stage
2	Alajuelense	36	19	7	10	47	28	+19	64	
3	Herediano	36	15	8	13	45	45	0	53	
4	Brujas	38	12	14	12	40	40	0	50	Qualified to the 2010–11 CONCACAF Champions League Preliminary Round
5	Pérez Zeledón	34	13	9	12	43	46	−3	48	
6	Santos	36	12	10	14	35	40	−5	46	
7	Puntarenas	40	10	16	14	42	53	−11	46	
8	Cartaginés	34	11	12	11	37	34	+3	45	
9	San Carlos	36	11	11	14	30	44	−14	44	
10	Águilas Guanacastecas (R)	34	10	9	15	46	51	−5	39	Relegated to the Segunda División de Costa Rica
11	Universidad de Costa Rica	32	7	14	11	34	34	0	35	
12	Ramonense (R)	32	5	17	10	28	34	−6	32	Relegated to the Segunda División de Costa Rica

Updated to match(es) played on May 16, 2010. Source: UNAFUT (in Spanish)
Rules for classification: 1) points; 2) goal difference; 3) number of goals scored.
(R) Relegated
