= Danny Carvajal =

Costa Rican footballer (born 1989)

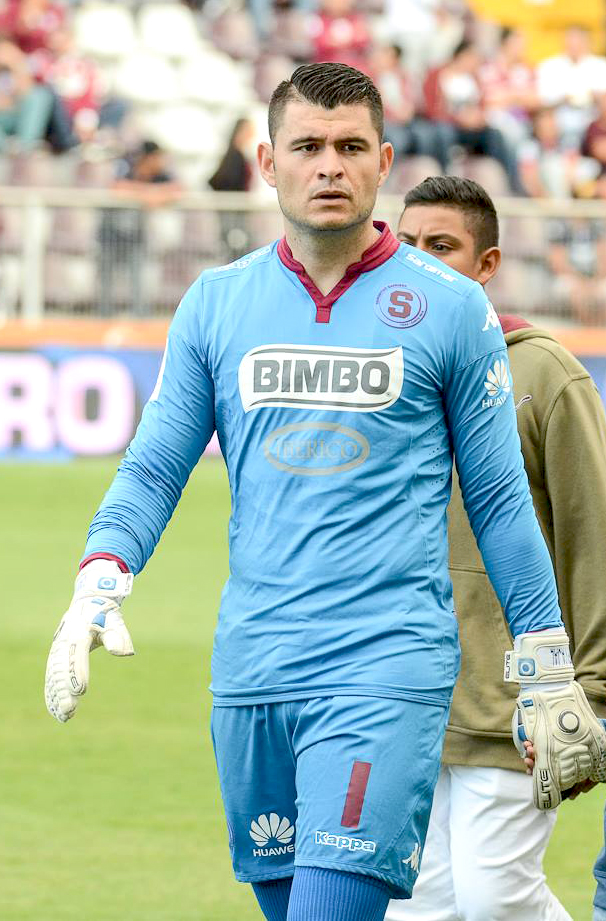
- Carvajal representing Saprissa in 2016

Personal information
- Full name: Danny Gabriel Carvajal Rodríguez
- Date of birth: 8 January 1989 (age 37)
- Place of birth: San Ramón, Costa Rica
- Height: 1.83 m (6 ft 0 in)
- Position: Goalkeeper

Team information
- Current team: Herediano
- Number: 1

Youth career
- 2004–2008: Saprissa
- 2008–2009: Brujas

Senior career*
Years	Team	Apps	(Gls)
2009–2011	Brujas	14	(0)
2011–2013	San Carlos	63	(0)
2013–2017	Saprissa	126	(0)
2017–2018	Albacete	2	(0)
2018	→ Tokushima Vortis (loan)	7	(0)
2018–2019	Mito HollyHock	0	(0)
2019–2023	FC Ryukyu	94	(0)
2024	San Carlos	45	(0)
2025–	Herediano	8	(0)

International career^{‡}
2017	Costa Rica	4	(0)
- * Club domestic league appearances and goals as of 12 March 2025 ‡ National team caps and goals as of 19 November 2018

Danny Gabriel Carvajal Rodríguez (Spanish pronunciation: [ˈdani kaɾβaˈxal]; born 8 January 1989) is a Costa Rican footballer who plays for Herediano as a goalkeeper.

== Club career ==
Born in San Ramón, Carvajal was a Deportivo Saprissa youth graduate. He made his first team debut for Brujas F.C. on 6 December 2009 by coming on as a second-half substitute in a 0–0 away draw against A.D. Ramonense.

Carvajal started to appear more regularly during the 2010–11 season, contributing with 12 appearances. In July 2011, after leaving the club after the end of the campaign due to economic problems, he joined fellow league team A.D. San Carlos.

Carvajal was an undisputed starter for San Carlos during his two-year spell, and on 15 May 2013 he returned to Saprissa, now assigned to the first team. Initially a backup to Donny Grant and Luis Ernesto Michel in his first campaign, he subsequently became first-choice and featured regularly in the following three years.

On 29 June 2017, Carvajal moved abroad for the first time in his career, signing for Segunda División side Albacete Balompié and becoming the third Costa Rican goalkeeper to represent the club (after Luis Conejo and Keylor Navas). The following 16 January, however, he was loaned to Tokushima Vortis until the end of the year.

== International career ==
Carvajal was called up to Costa Rica under-20s ahead of the 2009 FIFA U-20 World Cup, but was only a backup to Esteban Alvarado during the tournament. In June 2011 he was included in the main side's squad ahead of 2011 Copa América, but again remained a second-choice to Alvarado.

Carvajal was also called up to 2015 CONCACAF Gold Cup, Copa América Centenario, 2017 Copa Centroamericana and 2017 CONCACAF Gold Cup, mainly behind Alvarado and Navas. He only made his full international debut on 18 January 2017, starting in a 0–0 draw against Nicaragua.

== Honours ==
Brujas

- Liga FPD: 2009 Invierno

Saprissa

- Liga FPD: 2014 Verano, 2014 Invierno, 2015 Invierno, 2016 Invierno
- Costa Rican Cup: 2013
