= Football in Costa Rica =

- Country: Costa Rica
- Governing body: Costa Rican Football Federation
- National teams: Men's national team Women's national team
- First played: 1962

National competitions
- Liga Fútbol de Primera División; Liga de Ascenso Transcomer; Segunda B de LINAFA

International competitions
- CONCACAF Champions Cup; CONCACAF Central American Cup; FIFA Club World Cup; CONCACAF Gold Cup (National Team); CONCACAF Nations League (National Team); FIFA World Cup (National Team); CONCACAF Women's Championship (National Team); CONCACAF W Gold Cup (National Team); FIFA Women's World Cup (National Team)

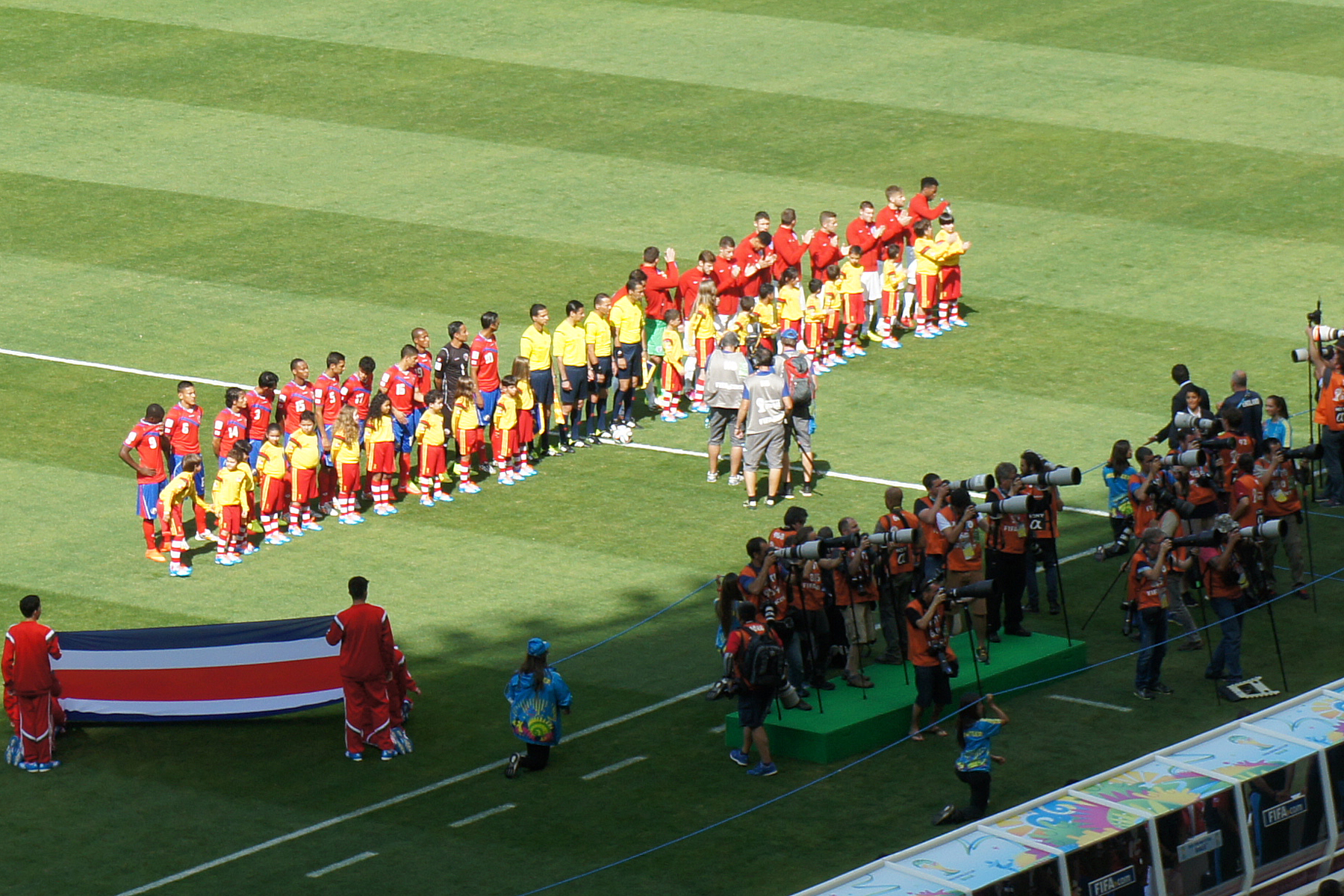
Costa Rica and England teams line up for national anthems at Mineirão stadium in Belo Horizonte during their match at the FIFA World Cup 2014, Brazil.

Football is the most popular sport in Costa Rica. Approximately 70% of the people in Costa Rica are interested in football.

Costa Rica has long been considered an exporter of footballers within Central America, with 19 players in European professional football leagues during 2006. The newspaper, La Nación, has prepared an annual census of these "Legionnaires" since 1994.

== Professional leauges ==
The main professional league in the country is Costa Rican Primera División run by UNAFUT. There is a second-tier league, Segunda División de Costa Rica, to which the last team of Primera is relegated after each season, and from which the champion is promoted to Primera. There is also a third tier league, in addition to many amateur players.

== History ==
Costa Rican players have made significant contributions to other nations' professional leagues, most notably the Mexican Primera Division since it became professional in 1943. These "Legionnaires" have represented the Costa Rica national football team, which most recently has included several players contracted to clubs outside Costa Rica during its 2014 FIFA World Cup qualification campaign.

On 24 June 2014, the Costa Rica team qualified for the knockout stages of the FIFA World Cup, topping a group that contained three former World Champions, beating Uruguay 3–1, Italy 1-0 and drawing their final game against England. Victory over Greece on penalties in the knock out stage secured them a place in the quarter-finals. In November 2020, FIFA announced that the Bureau of Council awarded Costa Rica the hosting rights for the 2022 FIFA U-20 Women's World Cup, which was earlier to be hosted between 20 January and 6 February 2021.

== League system ==
Level	League(s)/Division(s)
1	Primera División; 12 clubs
	↓↑ 1 club
2	Segunda División de Costa Rica; 18 clubs divided in 2 series of 9
	↓↑ 1 club
3	Torneo LINAFA; 60 clubs divided in 8 series, five of 8 clubs, two of 7 clubs and one of 6 clubs

== Stadiums in Costa Rica ==
Stadium	Country	Capacity	Tenants	Image
Estadio Nacional de Costa Rica	San José	35,062	Costa Rica national football team	
Estadio Ricardo Saprissa Aymá	San Juan de Tibás	23,112	Deportivo Saprissa	
Estadio Alejandro Morera Soto	Alajuela	17,895	Liga Deportiva Alajuelense	
Estadio José Rafael Fello Meza Ivankovich	Cartago	13,500	C.S. Cartaginés	
Estadio Edgardo Baltodano Briceño	Liberia	6,500	A.D. Municipal Liberia	
Estadio Jorge "Cuty" Monge	Desamparados	5,500	La U Universitarios	
Estadio José Joaquin "Colleya" Fonseca	Guadalupe	4,500	Guadalupe F.C.	
Estadio Miguel "Lito" Perez	Puntarenas	4,105	Puntarenas F.C.	

== Attendances ==
The average attendance per top-flight football league season and the club with the highest average attendance:

Season	League average	Best club	Best club average
2025 Clausura	3,002	Alajuelense	12,207

== See also ==
- Costa Rica national football team
- Lists of stadiums
