= Gabriel Badilla =

Costa Rican footballer (1984-2016)

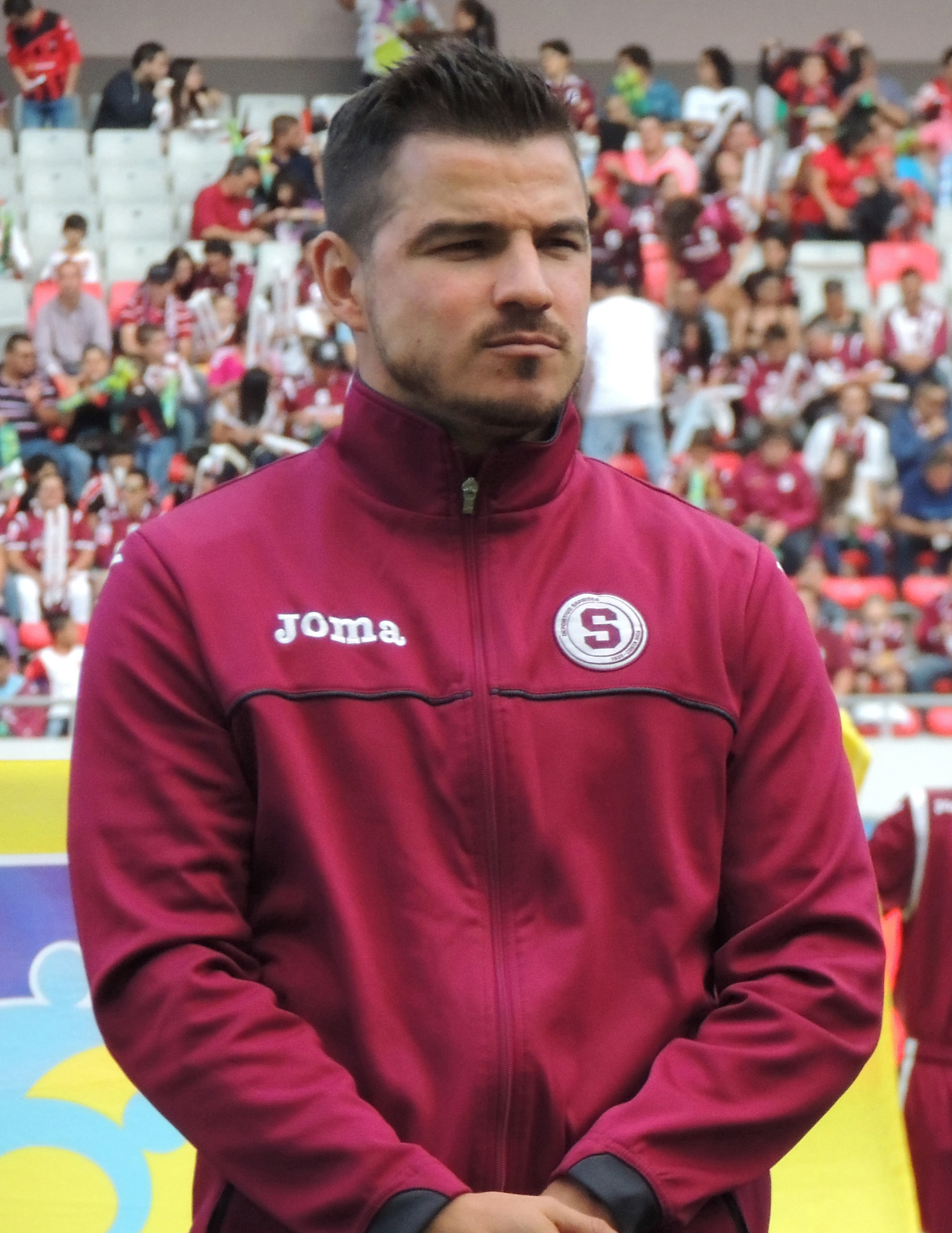
- Badilla before a game with Saprissa in 2016

Personal information
- Full name: Gabriel Badilla Segura
- Date of birth: June 30, 1984
- Place of birth: San José, Costa Rica
- Date of death: November 20, 2016 (aged 32)
- Height: 5 ft 11 in (1.80 m)
- Position: Defender

Youth career
- Saprissa

Senior career*
Years	Team	Apps	(Gls)
2001–2008	Saprissa	128	(12)
2008–2009	New England Revolution	6	(0)
2010–2016	Saprissa	111	(6)
Total		245	(18)

International career
2005–2012	Costa Rica	25	(1)
- * Club domestic league appearances and goals

Gabriel Badilla Segura (June 30, 1984 – November 20, 2016) was a Costa Rican footballer who played as a defender.

== Club career ==
Badilla began his career with Deportivo Saprissa, with whom he won two national championships as well as a UNCAF Cup title and a CONCACAF Champions Cup title. He was part of the team that played the 2005 FIFA Club World Championship and finished third behind São Paulo and Liverpool

Badilla signed for New England Revolution on August 18, 2008. He became an important part of the Revolution backline as the 2008 season progressed.

Badilla was released by New England on March 24, 2010.

== International career ==
Badilla was the captain of the Costa Rica national team that played in the 2001 FIFA U-17 World Championship held in Trinidad and Tobago He played for the senior Costa Rica national football team since 2005, including one appearance at the 2006 FIFA World Cup in Germany. He made his debut in a friendly against China on June 19, 2005.

He appeared in one match for Costa Rica at the 2005 CONCACAF Gold Cup and four matches at the 2007 CONCACAF Gold Cup. Most recently, Badilla has played in two qualifying matches for the 2010 FIFA World Cup.

== Honors ==
Saprissa

- Liga FPD
  - Winner (8): 2003–04, 2005–06, 2006–07, 2007 Invierno, 2008 Verano, 2014 Verano, 2014 Invierno, 2015 Invierno
  - Runner-up: 2002–03
- CONCACAF Champions Cup
  - Winner: 2005
  - Runner-up: 2004
- UNCAF Interclub Cup
  - Winner: 2003
  - Runner-up: 2001, 2004, 2007
- Costa Rican Cup
  - Winner: 2013
  - Runner-up: 2014
- FIFA Club World Cup
  - Third place: 2005

== Personal life ==
In 2013, Badilla underwent successful surgery to remove a benign tumor from his heart.

== Death ==
On November 20, 2016, Badilla was participating in a local marathon known as Lindora Run. Shortly before reaching the finish line, Badilla collapsed. After a long attempt to revive him, he was declared dead due to a cardiorespiratory arrest.
