= List of football clubs in Costa Rica =

This is a list of association football clubs located in Costa Rica. For a complete list, see Category:Football clubs in Costa Rica

== Active teams ==
=== A ===
- Alajuelense

=== B ===
- Barrio Mexico
- Belen
- Brujas F.C.

=== C ===
- Carmelita
- Cartaginés
- Coto Brus

=== D ===
- Deportivo Saprissa

=== H ===
- Herediano

=== L ===
- Liberia
- Limonense

=== O ===
- Orión F.C.

=== P ===
- Perez Zeledon
- Puntarenas F.C.

=== R ===
- Ramonense

=== S ===
- San Carlos
- Santacruceña
- Santos de Guápiles

=== U ===
- Universidad
- Uruguay de Coronado

== Defunct Teams ==
=== G ===
- Gimnástica de San José

=== L ===
- Limon FC
