= History of Deportivo Saprissa =

The history of Deportivo Saprissa begins with the club's foundation in 1935.

== Foundation and the amateur era (1935–1948) ==
Deportivo Saprissa was founded on July 16, 1935 by Roberto Fernández in his shoe store in el barrio Los Ángeles in downtown San José, Costa Rica. After a meeting with the football club's members Beto Fernandez decided to name his team after the man who sponsored their uniform, Don Ricardo Saprissa Aymá and with this announcement they entered the Costa Rican Third Division as Saprissa F.C.

In 1947 with Ricardo Saprissa's financial support and excellent coaching by Francisco García, Llos morados won the Costa Rican Third Division Championship. In 1948 they were promoted to the Costa Rican Second Division and then won the championship, winning promotion to the Primera División de Costa Rica, making their debut in the top flight on 21 August 1949. The club has remained in the Costa Rican top flight ever since.

== Professional era (1948–1990s) ==
In March 1959, Deportivo Saprissa achieved recognition as being the first Latin American soccer team to travel around the world. They played 22 games in 6 countries and 3 colonial enclaves, in which they won 14 games, tied one, and lost 7. In Costa Rica, they were named the "Team of the Century" as they had participated in 50 Costa Rican Championships. They also have the immense prestige of winning six consecutive Costa Rican National Championships between 1972 and 1977, a record that stands in Costa Rica, and is shared with Olimpia of Paraguay within the Americas.

On August 15, 1961, Real Madrid faced Saprissa in the old Estadio Nacional de Costa Rica. Real Madrid had stars like Ferenc Puskás, Alfredo Di Stéfano and Paco Gento. The match ended 4–2 with a victory for Real Madrid.

During the end of the 1980s and beginning of the 1990s, Saprissa was the backbone of the Costa Rica national football team, whose international pinnacle came at the 1990 FIFA World Cup held in Italy, when against all odds, Costa Rica reached the second round, eliminating countries such as Scotland and Sweden.

== 1959 tour ==
In March 1959, Deportivo Saprissa achieved recognition for being the first Latin American football team to travel around the world. On their travels they visited 25 different countries, playing 22 games in nine countries. They won 14 games, drew one, and lost seven.

Date	Opponent	Score	Venue
1959-03-31	Curaçao	1-0	Willemstad, Netherlands Antilles
1959-04-02	Aruba	0-1	Oranjestad, Aruba
1959-04-07	Deportivo Español	6-1	Caracas, Venezuela
1959-04-09	Deportivo Portugués	4-2	Caracas, Venezuela
1959-04-14	FK Austria Wien	1-6	Vienna, Austria
1959-04-20	Maccabi Haifa F.C.	1-0	Haifa, Israel
1959-04-23	Hapoel Tel Aviv F.C.	2-2	Jaffa, Israel
1959-04-27	Tel Aviv all-stars	8–2	Tel Aviv, Israel
1959-05-02	Hong Kong First Division League all-stars	4–1	Hong Kong
1959-05-03	Hong Kong	4-1	Hong Kong
1959-05-06	China	2-1	Hong Kong
1959-05-10	Persija Jakarta	4-6	Jakarta, Indonesia
1959-05-12	Indonesia	3-0	Jakarta, Indonesia
1959-05-16	Sydney	2-4	Sydney, Australia
1959-05-17	South Australia	5-1	Sydney, Australia
1959-05-20	Sydney	1-6	Sydney, Australia
1959-05-23	New South Wales all-stars	2-4	Sydney, Australia
1959-05-27	Waikato	2-1	Auckland, New Zealand
1959-05-30	Auckland	4-1	Auckland, New Zealand
1959-06-01	South Island	2-1	Auckland, New Zealand
1959-06-04	Wellington	6-2	Auckland, New Zealand
1959-06-06	New Zealand	2–3	Auckland, New Zealand

== 2000–present ==
Since the 2000s, Saprissa continues to make international and national history. Saprissa's first historic event was finishing third in the 2005 FIFA Club World Championship, qualifying after winning the 2005 CONCACAF Champions' Cup. In they road, they defeated 1–0 Sydney FC in the quarter-finals, but they lost 3–0 against Liverpool in the semifinals, but they would get the third place winning 3–2 against Al-Ittihad in the third place match, and Álvaro Saborío being the top scorer in the tournament, sharing record with Amoroso, Mohammed Noor, and Peter Crouch.

On August 4, 2012, Atlético de Madrid faced Saprissa in the Estadio Ricardo Saprissa Aymá for a trip through America. The match ended 0–0.

They would go from having 22 to 40 national titles, being the top winners in the country, including a four-time championship from 2022 to 2024, and signing new footballers such as Kendall Waston, Mariano Torres and Kevin Chamorro. The three-time championship made Saprissa one of the 30 most title-winning teams in the world with 50 titles.
