= Supercopa Centroamericana =

- Founded: 2015
- Region: UNCAF (Central America)
- Teams: 2
- 2015 Supercopa Centroamericana

The Supercopa Centroamericana is an annual football match organized and contested by the reigning champions of the Costa Rican Cup and the Honduran Cup. It takes place before the start of each domestic season, between July and August.

The first edition will be played between 2014 Costa Rican Cup champions C.S. Cartaginés and 2015 Honduran Cup champions C.D. Olimpia in a two-legged series between 25 July and 1 August 2015.

== History ==
Year	Winner	Runner-up
2015	TBD	TBD

== Performance by club ==
Club	Winners	Runners-up	Years won
TBD	–	–	–
TBD	–	–	–

== By countries ==
Nation	Winners	Runners-up
TBD	–	–
TBD	–	–
