= 1921 Costa Rican Primera División season =

Costa Rican professional football season

Primera División
- Season: 1921
- Dates: 3 July–
- Goals scored: 133

The 1921 Primera División was the inaugural season of the Costa Rican Primera División, the top division of Costa Rican football. The league was formed on 13 June. The first match was played on 3 July between S.G. Limonense and C.S. La Libertad which ended in a 0–1 win to the away team.

== Standings ==
Pos	Team	Pld	W	D	L	GF	GA	GD	Pts
1	Herediano	11	9	1	1	37	12	+25	19
2	Gimnástica Española	11	5	2	4	22	19	+3	12
3	La Libertad	11	5	2	4	17	9	+8	12
4	Cartaginés	12	5	1	6	12	22	−10	11
5	Limonense	12	5	0	7	14	18	−4	10
6	La Unión	11	4	0	7	17	23	−6	8
7	Alajuelense	12	3	2	7	14	30	−16	8
