= Carlos Restrepo (football manager) =

Colombian football coach (born 1961)

Personal information
- Full name: Carlos Alberto Restrepo Isaza
- Date of birth: 5 March 1961 (age 65)
- Place of birth: Medellín, Colombia

Managerial career
- Years: Team
- 1992–1994: Once Caldas
- 1995: Junior
- 1996–1997: Independiente Medellín
- 1998: Deportes Tolima
- 1999: Deportes Quindío
- 2000: Deportivo Pasto
- 2001: Deportivo Táchira
- 2002–2005: Pérez Zeledón
- 2005–2007: Brujas
- 2007: Alajuelense
- 2008: Municipal Liberia
- 2008–2009: Pérez Zeledón
- 2009: Puntarenas
- 2010–2011: CD Olimpia
- 2011: Pérez Zeledón
- 2012–2016: Colombia U20
- 2015–2016: Colombia U23
- 2017–2018: CD Olimpia
- 2019–2020: Real España
- 2020: San Carlos
- 2022: Atlético Nacional (assistant)
- 2023: Jaguares de Córdoba

Carlos Alberto "Piscis" Restrepo Isaza (born 5 March 1961) es un entrenador profesional de fútbol, dirigió a la selección Colombia para el mundial sub-20 del año 2011 en París. Actualmente es un empresario dedicado al coaching y conferencista con proyectos empresariales.

== Career ==
Never having the opportunity of playing the sport professionally because of an injury, he began his coaching career at his early 20s. After some time spent managing in minor leagues and regional teams in his home country, he took over several U-17 and U-20 Colombia national football teams. He then began coaching teams such as Once Caldas, Independiente Medellín, Atlético Junior, Deportes Quindío and Deportes Tolima. He won the first division tournament of Fútbol Profesional Colombiano in 1995 with Atlético Junior.

He then went on to manage Deportivo Táchira of the Primera División Venezolana, or Venezuelan Professional Football League. He arrived to Costa Rica in 2002, and coached Municipal Pérez Zeledón for three years, where he won the Apertura Championship of Costa Rica's first division in 2004, against all odds. In 2005, he was signed by Brujas where he was able to build a very competitive team and battled to win the Costa Rica's first division title.

In 2013, he managed Colombia U-20 team to win their third South American Youth Championship. In 2017, he was named coach for Olimpia after Hector Vargas was fired.

In 2019, he was named coach for Real España. After that, in 2020 he was named coach of AD San Carlos in Costa Rican first division.

== Managerial statistics ==
Statistics accurate as of 12 June 2017

Team	Nat	From	To	Record				
Team	Nat	From	To	P	W	D	L	Win %
Alajuelense	Costa Rica	July 2007	November 2007	13	6	5	2	46.15
Puntarenas	Costa Rica	July 2009	November 2009	22	7	7	8	31.82
Olimpia	Honduras	January 2010	March 2011	61	25	22	14	40.98
Pérez Zeledón	Costa Rica	July 2011	November 2011	17	6	5	6	35.29
Colombia U20	Colombia	February 2012	February 2017	52	23	13	16	44.23
Colombia Olympic	Colombia	February 2012	February 2017	12	5	6	1	41.67
Total				177	72	58	47	40.68

== Honors ==
Junior

- Categoría Primera A (1): 1995

Olimpia

- Liga Nacional (1): 2009 Clausura

Pérez Zeledón

- Primera División (1): 2004 Apertura
