= 2014 Costa Rican Cup =

Costa Rican Cup
Copa Popular

Tournament details
- Country: Costa Rica
- Teams: 16

Final positions
- Champions: Cartaginés
- Runners-up: Saprissa

Tournament statistics
- Matches played: 29
- Goals scored: 86 (2.97 per match)
- Top goal scorer(s): Ariel Rodríguez (5 goals)

The 2014 Costa Rican Cup (known as Copa Popular for sponsorship reasons) is the 2nd staging of the Costa Rican Cup. The competition began on July 12 and finished on August 10 with the final at the Estadio Nacional.

The Cup featured 16 teams, including 12 from the FPD (including the newly promoted team AS Puma Generaleña), and 4 from the Liga de Ascenso (not including the recently relegated team, Puntarenas).

The tournament marked several differences compared to its predecessor. A Group Stage was added, with the first placed teams of each group qualifying to the Semi-Finals.

The tournament saw Cartaginés defeating defending champions Saprissa in the final to achieve their first Costa Rican Cup.

== Qualified teams ==
The following teams competed in the 2014 Copa Popular.

12 teams from the 2014–15 FPD:

- Alajuelense
- AS Puma Generaleña
- Belén
- Carmelita
- Cartaginés
- Herediano
- Limón
- Pérez Zeledón
- Santos de Guápiles
- Saprissa
- Universidad de Costa Rica
- Uruguay de Coronado

4 teams from the 2014 15 Liga de Ascenso:

- Cariari
- Guanacasteca
- Jacó Rays
- San Carlos

== Group stage ==
=== Group A ===
Team	Pld	W	D	L	GF	GA	GD	Pts
Saprissa	3	3	0	0	15	4	+11	9
Limón	3	1	0	2	4	6	−2	3
Santos	3	1	0	2	4	6	−2	3
Cariari	3	1	0	2	3	10	−7	3

=== Group B ===
Team	Pld	W	D	L	GF	GA	GD	Pts
Alajuelense	3	2	0	1	5	2	+3	6
Carmelita	3	2	0	1	4	2	+2	6
UCR	3	1	0	2	5	3	+2	3
Guanacasteca	3	1	0	2	1	8	−7	3

=== Group C ===
Team	Pld	W	D	L	GF	GA	GD	Pts
Cartaginés	3	2	1	0	7	4	+3	7
Pérez Zeledón	3	1	1	1	4	4	0	4
AS Puma Generaleña	3	0	3	0	4	4	0	3
Jacó Rays	3	0	1	2	2	5	−3	1

=== Group D ===
Team	Pld	W	D	L	GF	GA	GD	Pts
Herediano	3	3	0	0	6	1	+5	9
San Carlos	3	1	1	1	3	3	0	4
Belén	3	1	0	2	2	4	−2	3
Uruguay	3	0	1	2	2	5	−3	1

== Knockout stage ==
Semi-Finals
D	Herediano	1	1	2 (5)
A	Saprissa (pen.)	1	1	2 (6)
B	Alajuelense	1	1	2
C	Cartaginés	2	2	4

Finals
Saprissa	2
Cartaginés	3
