= Rafael Bolaños =

Costa Rican stadium

Coordinates: 9.99608°N 84.24373°W

Estadio Rafael Bolaños
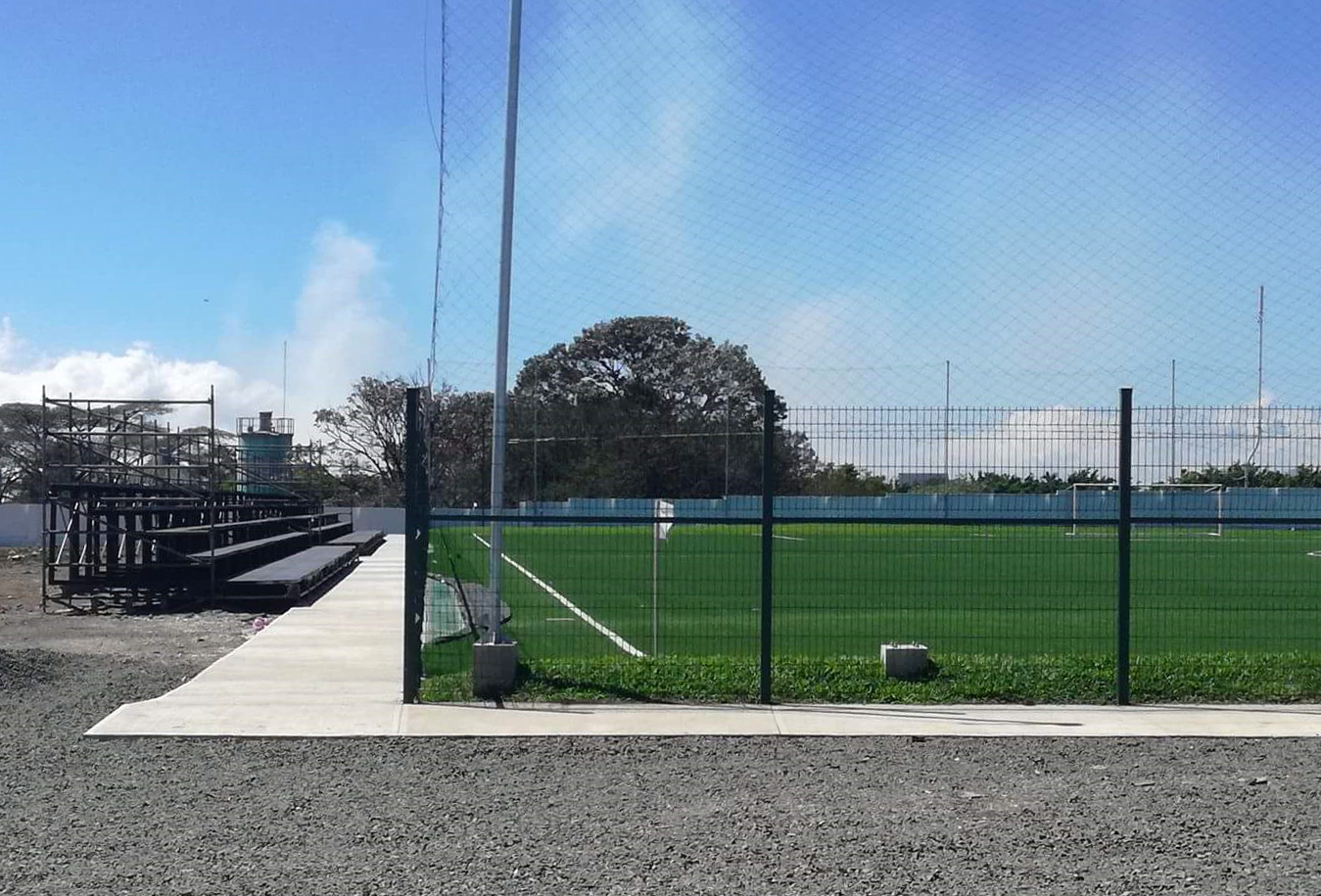
- Interactive map of Estadio Rafael Bolaños
- Location: (Alajuela Province) El Coyol, Alajuela
- Owner: Group of Investors
- Operator: A.D. Carmelita
- Capacity: 2,500
- Surface: Artificial
- Field size: 105 m × 60 m (344 ft × 197 ft)

Construction
- Built: 2003
- Renovated: 2017

Tenants
- A.D. Carmelita

The Rafael Bolaños Stadium is a private multi use stadium located in El Coyol, in the outskirts of the city of Alajuela, Costa Rica.

It was inaugurated in 2003 and in 2017 it received an overhaul in the infrastructure. Is part of the Wilmer López Sport Complex.

The stadium is used by A.D. Carmelita for his home games in the Liga FDP

== History ==
When the Wilmer López Sport Complex was built, they had in thought building a place different than the other ones already existing. It was built in mind of people enjoying the place and practicing sports, especially soccer (or football as is it called in Costa Rica). That's why it was built, taking the name of one of the most iconic soccer player that had ever played for the local team Liga Deportiva Alajuelense.

It was inaugurated in 2003 within the Sport Complex, who already had 5 5v5 soccer fields, 1 7v7 soccer field, 1 9v9 soccer field, gym, a theater, restaurant, and a sports shop.

In 2017 the Sport Complex started building and renovating for a new soccer pitch that will allow a team to play their home games in the Costa Rican First Division of Soccer called Liga FDP with a new artificial ground and a 2400 capacity seats.

It was inaugurated in January 2018 with a match between A.D. Carmelita against A.D. Municipal Pérez Zeledón for the winter season of the Liga FDP, with a 0-1 win for the visitors.

It was named "Rafael Bolaños" in honor of the father of the landlord and majority shareholder of the A.D. Carmelita team.
