= Honduran Cup =

Honduran association football tournament

- Honduran Cup logo
- Founded: 1968
- Abolished: 2019
- Region: Honduras
- Teams: 64
- Qualifier for: Supercopa Centroamericana
- Last champions: Platense
- Most championships: Olimpia (3 times); Platense (3 times)
- Website: copapresidente.hn
- 2018 Honduran Cup

The Honduran Cup was the top knock-out football tournament in Honduras. The first tournament was played in 1968, four years later the second tournament took the name Copa Presidente (English: President's Cup) in honor of Dr. Ramón Cruz; later, General Oswaldo López changed the name and called it Copa Jefe de Estado (English: Head of State Cup). Twenty years later the third tournament was played. From 1992 to 1994, the Cup tournament was played as a separate tournament from the league (played from June to August). From 1995 to 1999, the winner of the first stage of the league tournament was declared Cup champions. In 2015, the tournament was yet again re-launched and re-branded as Copa Presidente. Since 2015, the Honduran Cup serves as a qualifier to the Supercopa Centroamericana.

== Re-launch ==
In May 2013, the National League and the Liga de Ascenso proposed to reactive the tournament in the near future. The new Cup would consist of 64 clubs from the first, second and third division. The tournament hasn't been played since 1998. The new cup will run for an entire year starting 2015. Beginning in the 2015–16 edition, the tournament will run from August to May.

== Champions ==
Season	Champion	Runner-up
1968	Motagua	España
1969–1971	Not held	
1972	España	Marathón
1973–1991	Not held	
1992	Real España	Victoria
1993	Real Maya	Motagua
1994	Marathón	Real Maya
1995	Olimpia	Motagua
1996	Platense	Victoria
1997	Platense	Motagua
1998	Olimpia	Motagua
1999–2014	Not held	
2015	Olimpia	Platense
2015–16	Juticalpa	Real España
2017	Marathón	Gimnástico
2018	Platense	Real España
2019	Cancelled	

=== Titles by club ===
Club	Champion	Runners-up
Platense	3	1
Olimpia	3	0
Real España	2	2
Marathón	2	1
Motagua	1	4
Real Maya	1	1
Juticalpa	1	0
Victoria	0	2
Gimnástico	0	1

== See also ==
- Honduran Liga Nacional
- Honduran Supercup
