= Juan Luis Hernández =

Spanish association football player

Personal information
- Full name: Juan Luis Hernández Fuertes
- Date of birth: 24 June 1949 (age 77)
- Place of birth: Spain

Managerial career
- Years: Team
- 1986–1987: Ramonense
- 1987–1988: Cartaginés
- 1993–1994: Costa Rica
- 1997: Costa Rica
- 2005: Cobán Imperial
- 2008–2010: Cartaginés
- 2011: Puntarenas
- 2012–2013: Orión

Juan Luis Hernández Fuertes (born 24 June 1949) is a Spanish former football manager who last managed Orión.

== Early life ==
He was born in 1949 in Madrid, Spain.

== Career ==
In 1986, he arrived in Costa Rica. He helped Costa Rican side Herediano win the league. After that, he was appointed manager of the Costa Rica national football team. He has managed the most games in the Costa Rican top flight. he has been regarded as a controversial manager.

== Personal life ==
He has suffered from cancer.
