= 2015 Supercopa Centroamericana =

Cartaginés	Olimpia
Costa Rican Cup	Honduran Cup
- Venue: Estadio Fello Meza, Cartago
- Venue: Estadio Nacional, Tegucigalpa

The 2015 Supercopa Centroamericana was an announced two-legged football match-up scheduled to be played in July and August 2015 between C.S. Cartaginés, winners of the 2014 Costa Rican Cup, and C.D. Olimpia, winners of the 2015 Honduran Cup. It was intended to be the first edition of the competition; however, without further explanation from the organizers, the matches were never played.

== Match details ==
=== First leg ===
25 July 2015	Cartaginés	–	Olimpia	Cartago, Costa Rica
(UTC−06:00)				Stadium: Estadio José Rafael Fello Meza Ivankovich

=== Second leg ===
1 August 2015	Olimpia	–	Cartaginés	Tegucigalpa, Honduras
(UTC−06:00)				Stadium: Estadio Tiburcio Carías Andino

== See also ==
- 2014 Costa Rican Cup
- 2015 Honduran Cup
