= José Luis Cordero (footballer) =

Costa Rican footballer (born 1987)

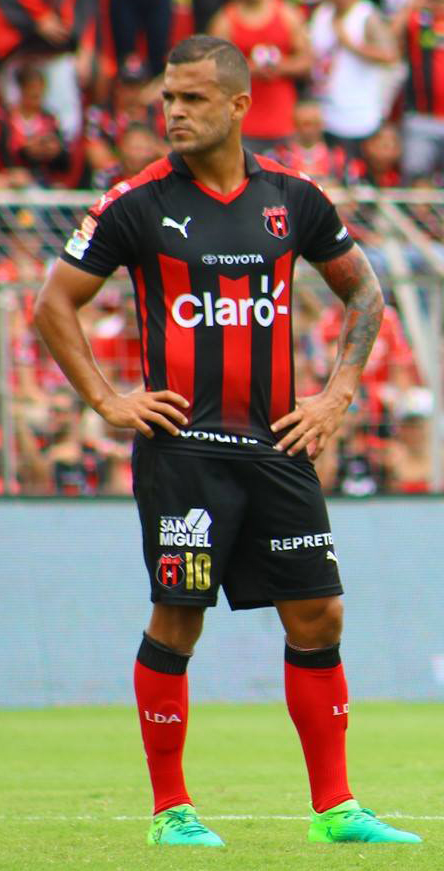
- Cordero in 2017

Personal information
- Full name: José Luis Cordero Manzanares
- Date of birth: 31 January 1987 (age 39)
- Place of birth: San José, Costa Rica
- Height: 1.68 m (5 ft 6 in)
- Positions: Left midfielder; right midfielder

Team information
- Current team: Guadalupe

Youth career
- Saprissa

Senior career*
Years	Team	Apps	(Gls)
2005–2010	Saprissa		
2010	Ramonense		
2010–2011	Brujas	16	(4)
2011–2012	Herediano	37	(14)
2012–2013	Saprissa	38	(4)
2013–2014	Ratchaburi	14	(4)
2014	Herediano	5	(0)
2014–2015	Belén	22	(5)
2015–2016	Herediano	22	(2)
2015–2017	→ Belén (loan)	39	(20)
2016–2019	Alajuelense	67	(14)
2019	→ San Carlos (loan)	21	(4)
2019	San Carlos	18	(2)
2020–2021	Guadalupe	43	(5)

International career
- Costa Rica U20
- * Club domestic league appearances and goals as of 00:38, 5 October 2021 (UTC)

José Luis Cordero Manzanares (born 31 January 1987) in Costa Rica is a footballer who plays as a midfielder.

== Club career ==
Cordero came through the Saprissa youth system and made his senior debut for them 2008. He left Saprissa for Ramonense before the 2010 Verano championship. He later played for Brujas in the CONCACAF Champions League and Herediano.

He was elected the season's best player after the 2011 Invierno when with Herediano but forced the club to sell him to rivals Saprissa in March 2012.

In June 2013 Saprissa sold Cordero to Thai football club Ratchaburi but in January 2014, he returned to Herediano to sign a three-year contract and apologize to the fans for insulting the club when he left for Saprissa in 2012. In May 2014, Cordero left Herediano by mutual consent.
