= 2013 Costa Rican Cup =

Costa Rican Cup
Copa BN

Tournament details
- Country: Costa Rica
- Teams: 16

Final positions
- Champions: Saprissa
- Runners-up: Carmelita

Tournament statistics
- Matches played: 29
- Goals scored: 87 (3 per match)
- Top goal scorer(s): Diego Estrada (5 goals)

The 2013 Costa Rican Cup (known as the Torneo de Copa Banco Nacional or Copa BN for sponsorship reasons) is the 1st staging of the Costa Rican Cup. The competition began on July 7 and finished on August 4 with Saprissa crowned as the first champions after defeating Carmelita in the penalty shoot-outs in the final at the national stadium.

The 2013 Copa BN featured 16 teams, 12 from the Primera División (including the newly promoted team, Universidad de Costa Rica) and 4 from the Segunda División (not including the recently relegated team, A.D. San Carlos).

== Qualified teams ==
The following teams competed in the 2013 Costa Rican Cup

11 teams of 2012–13 Costa Rican Primera División season:

- Alajuelense
- Belén
- Carmelita
- Cartaginés
- Herediano
- Limón
- Pérez Zeledón
- Puntarenas
- Santos de Guápiles
- Saprissa
- Uruguay de Coronado

5 teams of 2012-13 Costa Rican Segunda División season:

- AS Puma Generaleña
- Guanacasteca
- Jacó Rays
- Juventud Escazuceña
- Universidad de Costa Rica

== Bracket ==
The seeding was made on 20 June 2013.

Round of 16
1	Puntarenas	1	2	3 (2)
16	Uruguay (pen.)	1	2	3 (4)
8	Guanacasteca	0	0	0
9	Saprissa	1	3	4
5	Escazuceña	1	2	3
12	Cartaginés	3	2	5
4	Santos de Guápiles	2	1	3
13	Limón	0	2	2
6	A.D. Belén	1	2	3 (2)
11	Carmelita (pen.)	2	1	3 (3)
3	UCR	2	1	3
14	Alajuelense	1	3	4
7	Jacó Rays (pen.)	1	2	3 (6)
10	C.S. Herediano	0	3	3 (5)
2	AS Puma	2	4	6
15	Municipal Pérez Zeledón	3	0	3

Quarter-finals
Uruguay	1	1	2
Saprissa	4	2	6
Cartaginés	1	4	5
Santos	1	2	3
Carmelita	1	2	3
L.D. Alajuelense	1	1	2
Jacó Rays	1	2	3
AS Puma	1	0	1

Semi-finals
Deportivo Saprissa (pen.)	1	2	3 (7)
Cartaginés	1	2	3 (6)
Carmelita	2	1	3
Jacó Rays	1	1	2

Final
Deportivo Saprissa	0 (4)
Carmelita	0 (2)

== Top goalscorers ==
Rank	Player	Club	Goals
1	(Costa Rica) Diego Estrada	Saprissa	5
2	(Costa Rica) Mario Camacho	Carmelita	4
3	(Costa Rica) Randall Brenes	Cartaginés	3
Source: La Nación
