= Orión F.C. =

Association football club in Costa Rica

Orión
- Full name: Orión F.C. Sociedad Anónima Deportiva
- Nickname(s): Azulgranas; Orionistas
- Founded: 26 June 1926; 98 years ago
- Ground: Estadio Cuty Monge; Desamparados, Costa Rica
- Capacity: 5,500
Home colours	Away colours

Orión F.C. is a Costa Rican football club, based in Desamparados. It was founded in 1926 and has most recently played in Costa Rica's First Division in 2012. They were crowned national league champions twice.

== History ==
The Orion F.C. football club was founded on June 26, 1926. Playing in First Division 36 tournaments, the club secured two Costa Rican national championships and six runners-up, ranking sixth in Costa Rican football history. In 1931 Orión was national runner-up after losing in the finals against Herediano. In 1938 Orión, led by national hero Ricardo Saprissa, won its first championship title in a final match against Sociedad Gimnástica, and its second against Herediano in 1944, ending the season undefeated. They received more runner-up finishes in 1940 (Cartaginés), 1945 (Alajuelense), 1949 (Alajuelense again), 1951 (Herediano) and the last consolation trophy in 1964 before the Saprissa.

=== Years in the darkness ===
Orion F.C. dropped to Costa Rica's Second Division in 1968. In 1998, following twenty years of fruitless efforts and a disappointing match against Siquirres La France (3–3) the team descended to the Third Division and its president Manolo Gómez Mora decided to lower the flag of the historic football and retire Orion F.C. as a football club.

The club resurfaced in 2006–2007 through efforts initiated by its current president, Juan Luis Hernández. It was given the opportunity to compete in the Liga Ascenso (Second Division) after acquiring the franchise of Asociación Deportiva Puntarenense-Parrita (ASODEPU).

Over their 80-year history the club has allied with Orion HS, Orion, Peripherals, Orion-Tibas, Orion-Carthaginian among others. The team began the 2009–2010 season playing in the Estadio Municipal in the city of Orotina. In January 2010 relocated its head office to the Estadio Lito Monge in Curridabat.

=== Primera Division return ===
In April 2011 Brujas' Primera División franchise was transferred to Orión, who continued to play at the Cuty Monge stadium and acquired by Spaniard Juan Luis Hernández Fuertes. and returned to the top tier after 43 years of absence. In summer 2012 they lost a promotion/relegation playoff to Carmelita but later unsuccessfully filed a complaint with FIFA over irregularities with other clubs in a bid to stay in the top tier.

== Honours ==
- Primera División de Costa Rica

Champion (2): 1938, 1944

== Players 1938 ==
List of champion players: Enrique Umaña, Juan Tellini, Carlos Silva Loaiza, Claudio Gómez, Ubaldo Cháves, José Monge, Numa Ruiz, Víctor Valerín, Walker Rodríguez, Carlos Robles, Carlos Muñoz, Armando Calleza, Oscar Rodríguez, Oscar Bolaños, Manuel Jiménez, Jesús Araya, Alfredo Chacón, Jorge Lozano, Israel Delgado, Eugenio Jiménez, Jesús Jiménez, Alejandro Arguedas, Alfredo Piedra, Guido Matamoros and Miguel Bolaños.

== Players 1944 ==
List of champion players: José Torres, Edgar Silva, Ignacio García, Olman Vargas, Alberto Armijo, Hernán Solano, Mario Parreaguirre, Ricardo Jiménez, Ulises Alpizar, Mario Masís, Walter Allen, Hernán Umaña, Fernando Soto, Alfredo Piedra, Walker Rodríguez, Elías Valenciano, Marco Mora, Miguel Zeledón, Carlos Silva, Manuel Cantillo, Claudio Gómez, Rafael Campos, José Rodríguez and Alfredo García.
