= Estadio Guillermo Vargas Roldán =

- Interactive map of Estadio Guillermo Vargas Roldán
- Full name: Estadio Guillermo Vargas Roldán
- Coordinates: 10°5′30.16″N 84°28′34.58″W
- Owner: City of San Ramón
- Capacity: 4,000
- Surface: grass
- Field size: 100 x 72 m

Construction
- Opened: 1961

Tenant
- Asociación Deportiva Ramonense

Estadio Guillermo Vargas Roldán is a multi-use stadium in Alajuela, Costa Rica. It is currently used mostly for football matches and is the home stadium of Asociación Deportiva Ramonense. The stadium holds up to 4,000 people.

The stadium was named in December 1978 after former Ramonense club president Guillermo Vargas Roldán, who died in April 2014, aged 82. He had been president of the club for a record 22 years.
