= Costa Rican Cup =

Costa Rican association football tournament

- Founded: 2013
- Region: Costa Rica
- Teams: 16
- Qualifier for: Supercopa Centroamericana; CONCACAF League
- Current champions: Cartaginés
- Most championships: Cartaginés (3 titles)
- 2025–26 Costa Rican Cup

The Costa Rican Cup (Torneo de Copa de Costa Rica) is the top knock-out football tournament in Costa Rica which also serves as a qualification to the Supercopa Centroamericana.

It was played for three seasons from 2013 to 2015. A 2019 edition was announced, with the winner earning a berth to the CONCACAF League, but it was ultimately abandoned. The tournament returned in 2022.

== Champions ==
Season	Champion	Score	Runner up
2013	Deportivo Saprissa	0–0 (a.e.t.) (4–2 pen.)	Carmelita
2014	Cartaginés	3–2	Deportivo Saprissa
2015	Cartaginés	1–1 (a.e.t.) (3–1 pen.)	Herediano
2022	Cartaginés	3–2 (agg.)	Herediano
2023	Alajuelense	2–0	Deportivo Saprissa
2024–25	Alajuelense	1–0	Puntarenas
2025–26	Deportivo Saprissa	3–1	Sporting
