= Municipal Osa =

Osa
- Full name: Selección de Osa
- Nicknames: La Fuerza del Térraba; Oseños; Sureños
- Founded: 6 June 1983; 42 years ago
- Stadium: Estadio Municipal de Osa
- Capacity: 1,200
- League: LINAFA
- Clausura 2022: Group D - Metro Sur
Home colours	Away colours

Selección de Osa is a Costa Rican football club, currently playing in the Tercera Division.

They are based in the south of the country, in Ciudad Cortés, near the Panamanian border.

== History ==
Founded in June 1983 as Deportivo Hospital Tomás Casas, the name was changed to Municipal Osa quickly. They won promotion to the Segunda División in 1996 and reached the top flight after 4 more years. They won promotion after beating Municipal Liberia in a championship playoff. It was the same Liberia team that beat Osa in May 2003 to send them down to the Segunda División again.

They spent a total of 3 seasons in the Primera División.

== Honours ==
=== National ===
- Segunda División de Costa Rica: 1

2000

== Current squad ==
As of June 2, 2022

Note: Flags indicate national team as defined under FIFA eligibility rules; some limited exceptions apply. Players may hold more than one non-FIFA nationality.

No.	Pos.	Nation	Player
1		CRC	Justin Gabriel Quesada Espinoza
2		CRC	Pablo Alexander Jiménez López
3		CRC	José Ricardo Morales Méndez
4		CRC	Bayron Sibaja Samudio
5		CRC	Jeison Fernando Samudio Durán
6		CRC	Jesús Alberto Rodríguez Abrigo
7		CRC	Teylor Ransel Olivares Nuñes
8		CRC	Jonathan Elizondo Morales
9		CRC	Anthony Gonzales Cabrera
10		CRC	Kendall Fauricio Zúñiga Jiménez

No.	Pos.	Nation	Player
11		CRC	David Castro Valverde
12		CRC	Rafael Ángel Calderón Navarro
13		CRC	Carlos Alberto Matarrita Sandi
14		CRC	Derek Marcelo Salas Picado
15		CRC	Jorman Mauricio Jiménez Guzmán
16		CRC	Moisés Cerdas Robles
17		CRC	Gustavo Adolfo Ibarra Arguello
18		CRC	Kevin Alfredo Quesada Vargas
19		CRC	Gerald Alberto Arias Saborio
