= LINAFA =

Costa Rican association football league

- Founded: 2008; 2003–2008 (as Anafa); 1982–2003 (as Tercera Division); 1962–1982 (as Conafa)
- Country: Costa Rica
- Number of clubs: 36
- Level on pyramid: 3
- Promotion to: Liga de Ascenso
- Relegation to: LINAFA Third Division
- Broadcaster(s): -
- Website: Official website

The LINAFA Second B, also known as the Costa Rican Third Division, is a Costa Rican football league below the Costa Rican Second Division and above the LINAFA 3rd Division in the Costa Rican football pyramid. The league is very competitive as only one team per season is promoted.

== History ==
At the beginning of the 1920s, amateur soccer became established in the various cantons of Costa Rica. Several football projects of great importance are developed: the Third Division National League, the Inter-district or Neighborhood Tournaments, the Cantonal and Inter-cantonal League; the independent third divisions. The first official third division championship was played in 1924 with the Guadalupe club as the champion.

In 1962 the National League of Regional Subsidiaries (Costa Rican Cantons National Championship) was created. But it was not until the end of the National League championship in 1968, that the CONAFA (National Amateur Soccer Committee) was founded. Together with the local soccer committees, they organized the third division national championship (2nd Division of Promotion) in its final octagonal and quadrangular phase.

The third division championships in the case of CONAFA have an important precedent in the Amistad and Pueblos championships. Therefore, this league was of an official nature and was aimed at the district and cantonal champion clubs; however, a qualifying series was played to hold the national title; and from there came the next tenant of the second division.

In 1977, the Costa Rican Football Federation (FEDEFUTBOL) instituted the practice of promotion and relegation in the third division. This resulted from frequent requests from some clubs in the third division to the Costa Rican Federation of Amateur Soccer. FEDEFUTBOL was looking for the option to fill some quotas in the 2nd division. But in April 1979, COFA, which was the Organizing Committee for Amateur Soccer, separated from the federation.

In 1980, another football entity called Organizing Commission for Amateur Football (COFA) was founded and was supported by the General Directorate of Sports, which supported CONAFA and continued to be an accessory committee of FEDEFUTBOL (unrented football).

On Thursday, October 9 of the same year, COFA became an association and had 16 representatives at the regional level, including Hernán Redondo, Herman Solano, Jorge Meneses, José Calderón, Rafael Moya, Oscar Luis Vega and Manuel Riotte. Rodrigo Cháves served as attorney general.

For 1981, CONAFA organized the championship of the Third Division (2nd Division of Promotion) for the Second Division of Costa Rica, being in charge of the Competition Committee Mr. Carlos Luis Redondo. In the meantime COFA renamed ACOFA (Costa Rican Amateur Football Association) directed the Third Division (2nd Division B) and Second Amateur Division. Without underestimating the children's and youth tournaments (Fourth Division).

The 7 regional representatives of ACOFA were: José María Calderón, Hernán Redondo, José Joaquín Navarro, Hernán Solórzano, Jorge Meneses, Rafael Moya and Rigoberto Ugalde.

Among the participating and outstanding clubs for the Third Division (2nd Promotion Division) were A.D. San Lorenzo F.C, Deportivo San Pablo F.C, A.D. Guanacasteca F.C, Real Deportivo Rafaeleño Association, Deportivo Fértica F.C, A.D. San Miguel, Santa Barbara National Team, A.D. El Carmen F.C, Deportivo Yuba Paniagua, A.D. Selection of Escazú, Aserrí F.C, A.D. Orotinense, Deportivo Juan Gobán F.C, A.D. Barveña, A.D. Sagrada Familia, Deportivo Astúrias de Philadelphia, Juventus F.C, A.D. Llorente de Tibás, Rincón de Palmares C.F, C.D. Taboga de Guanacaste, among many.

For 1982 the Second Division by ACOFA organized, its national championship with 32 clubs with extensive football experience, being the first classified of the previous year the A.D. Tecnológico de Cartago (T.E.C), Deportivo Cariari de Plaza Viquez F.C, Asoc. Deportivo Diablos Rojos F.C and Deportivo Muelle Grande de San Carlos.

Within this count, the First Division by ACOFA also stands out, which allowed some clubs to rise to their Second Amateur Division. Some clubs that rose to the Second Amateur Division included the A.D. Fraternity, A.D. Belén Calle Flores, Independiente de Turrialba F.C and Santos de Guápiles F.C, who was Monarch Champion that year.

Likewise, on April 11, 1982, the third-tier championship began at the national level, and after the product of an eliminatory series, the agreement was made by the clubs for a respective registration in ANAFA (National Association of Amateur Soccer). The 3rd tier championship was founded on November 18 of that same year. By 1983, the second division B appeared, where only the clubs that qualified from the third division of ANAFA played.

In the 1997–98 season, the league was renamed as the First Division of ANAFA, and again in 2008-09 became National Amateur Football League (LINAFA), which is a Costa Rican soccer league equivalent to the third promotion division. Large national soccer clubs have passed through it, such as Club Sport Cartaginés, currently in the First Division; Club Sport Uruguay currently in the First Division; Orión F.C currently in the Second Division; and Club Sport La Libertad, which is in this league.

The Second B of LINAFA has a national character. It is organized in 10 groups of 7 and 8 teams each according to their geographical area (region). This tournament is too competitive (High Performance), due to the fact that only 1 team per season obtains the long-awaited title. And the LINAFA First Division champion goes up to the Ascent League; and the team with the lowest ranking in each group (10 in total) are relegated to the LINAFA Third Division (Fourth Division), and the top ten ranked in the latter are promoted, although in some cases there are relegations due to regulatory aspects.

== Competition system ==
2 tournaments are held, Opening and Closing (respectively). The winners of each tournament will be guaranteed a Grand Final between them to define the new participant for next season in the Costa Rican Second Division. In the event that the Champion of the Closing Tournament is the same as the Opening Tournament, there will be no grand final.

- First Phase:

In each group of 6, the team s will play 2 rounds, home and away. There is 10 match days for each team. The 4 best teams from each group qualify for the next phase.

- Second Phase:

Round-trip direct elimination classification system. The 12 winners of the series and the 4 best losers qualify for the next phase.

- Third Phase: (round of 16)

Round-trip direct elimination classification system.

- Fourth Phase: (quarterfinals)

Round-trip direct elimination classification system.

- Fifth Phase: (semifinals)

Round-trip direct elimination classification system.

- Sixth Phase: (final)

Play back and forth between the two competing teams,

== Clubs: 2022–23 ==
Some teams participating in different groups and stages depending on various factors such as geographic location and the economy, are divided into some groups.

- Teams by Groups

Group	Zone	Teams
Group A	Pacífico Chorotega	Águila FC; Tsunami Azul; Deportivo Upala F.C.; AD Cuajiniquil; Puntarenas San Luis F.C.; AD Esparza
Group B	Occidente	ADAFIA Atenas; AD Bajo Los Molinos; AD Ramonense; Barrio México F.C.; Nativet SC; GBT Fútbol Club
Group C	Metro A	Unión Escazú; AD Lankester; ACF Gallada; San Migool – Valle Central; MW-C.E.F; Puriscal FC
Group D	Metro Sur	Municipal Coto Brus; Selección de Osa; ASODEPA; A.D.F.C.F. UCR; Municipal Atenas; Asociación Deportiva Buenos Aires
Group E	Metro B	A.D. Valencia; P.R.S F.C. Desamparados; Deportivo Aurora Fusión; CCDR San Pablo; CD Pavas; Deportivo Los Guido
Group F	Atlántico	Talentos del Caribe; A.D.F. Siquirres; Athletic CR; La Colonia Revolution; Soccer Viza; Family Batán FC

== Promotion history ==
List of teams that won their right to play the championship in the Liga de Ascenso.

Season	Team
2011–12	Finca Austria de Nosara
2012–13	A.D.F. Siquirreña
2013–14	Pococi FC
2014–15	COFUTPA
2015–16	A.D. Santa Rosa
2016–17	Municipal Santa Ana
2017–18	Municipal Coto Brus
2018–19	Puerto Golfito F.C.
2019–20	A.D. Cariari Pococí
2020–21	No champions due to the COVID-19 pandemic
2021–22	A.D. Quepos Cambute
2022–23	
