= Jorge Hernán "Cuty" Monge Stadium =

Costa Rican sports stadium

Coordinates: 9.88962°N 84.04929°W

Jorge Hernán "Cuty" Monge
- "Cuty" Monge
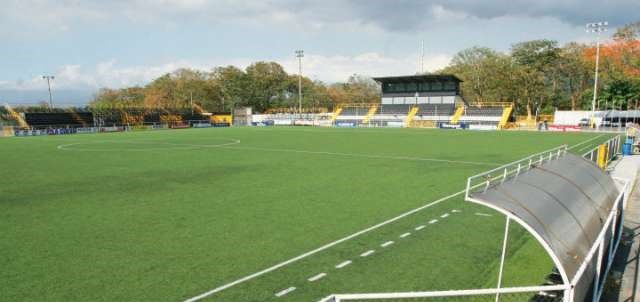
- Interactive map of Jorge Hernán "Cuty" Monge
- Location: Desamparados, San José (San José, Costa Rica)
- Owner: Desamparados Local Government
- Operator: Desamparados Municipality
- Capacity: 5,500
- Field size: 105 x 70 m
- Surface: Artificial

Construction
- Opened: 1997
- Renovated: 2006
- Expanded: 2008

Tenants
- C.F. Universidad de Costa Rica; Desamparados F.C.

Website
- https://www.desamparados.go.cr/es/servicios/villa-olimpica

Jorge Hernán "Cuty" Monge Stadium is a football stadium in Desamparados, Costa Rica. It is the home ground of the La U Universitarios team.

== Etymology ==
The stadium took its name from the former Costa Rican soccer player Jorge Monge, nicknamed "Cuty", who played in the 1950s and 1960s with the Deportivo Saprissa and the Costa Rica national football team.

== History ==
Because of Monge's achievements in the domestic league and national team, and with the national sporting games of 1997 in mind, the then president José María Figueres Olsen, with the minister of sports (in that year called National Sports Institute) named the stadium that was already in the José Figueres Ferrer Olympic Village in his honor.

The stadium was abandoned for almost 9 years until the national investor Minor Vargas negotiated with the Desamparados Municipality to renovate the stadium. The work was finished by 2008.

== Teams ==
For almost 4 years, the former club Brujas F.C. had no home venue, so they used the stadium as part of a list of rotating venues for their home games, including the Old Costa Rican National Stadium. In 2008 the club's owner and stadium investor Minor Vargas negotiated a 10 years contract for the use of the stadium as a home venue for the team including some infrastructure improvements for it; but his arrest in the United States brought financial troubles to the team that in 2011 was sold to the Spanish investor Juan Luis Hernández Fuertes and became Orion F.C.

Nowadays the stadium is in full use by the C.F. Universidad de Costa Rica team, which plays its home games there.
