= Estadio Lito Pérez =

Coordinates: 9.976422°N 84.838781°W

Estadio Municipal de Puntarenas Miguel Ángel "Lito" Pérez Treacy
- La Olla Mágica "The Magic Pot"
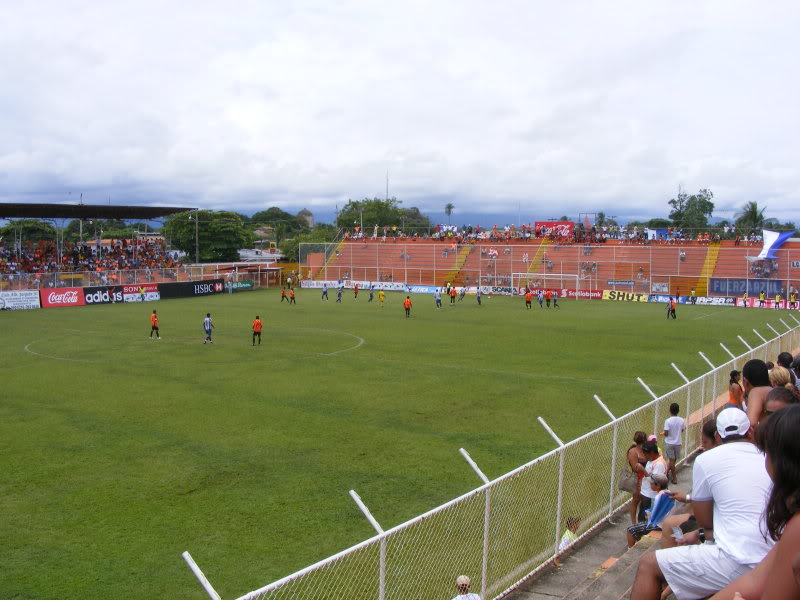
- Interactive map of Estadio Municipal de Puntarenas Miguel Ángel "Lito" Pérez Treacy
- Former names: Estadio Municipal de Puntarenas
- Location: 200 m. oeste de los Tribunales de Justicia, sobre Avenida Centenario, Puntarenas Centro, Puntarenas, Costa Rica
- Owner: Municipalidad de Puntarenas
- Operator: Score One Soccer
- Capacity: 4,105
- Surface: Grass

Construction
- Opened: 1958

Tenants
- A.D. Municipal Puntarenas F.C. (UNAFUT 1964–2002), (LIASCE 1951–1964, 2002– 2009), (LINAFA 2009–); Puntarenas F.C. (2004–)

Estadio Municipal de Puntarenas Miguel Ángel "Lito" Pérez Treacy is a multi-use stadium in Puntarenas Centro, Puntarenas, Costa Rica. It is nicknamed “La Olla Mágica” ("The Magic Pot") due to the warm weather that is common in the stadium.

Formerly known as Estadio Municipal de Puntarenas. In 1974, then mayor Lorgio Álvarez proposed to rename the stadium after Puntarenas native football star "Lito" Perez. The motion was approved by the municipal council and the stadium took its new name.

It is currently used mostly for football matches and is the home stadium of Puntarenas F.C., S.A.D and A.D. Municipal Puntarenas F.C. The stadium holds 4,105 people.

In 2009, Score One Soccer was granted a 10-year contract by Municipalidad de Puntarenas to operate the stadium.

In late 2009 and early 2010, the stadium's locker and press rooms were renovated, field lighting was improved and it is believed to be the best stadium lighting in Central America.
