= Brujas F.C. =

Association football club in Costa Rica

Brujas
- Full name: Brujas Fútbol Club
- Nickname: Hechiceros
- Founded: 2004
- Dissolved: 2011
- Ground: Estadio Jorge "Cuty" Monge; Desamparados, Costa Rica
- Capacity: 5,500
Home colours	Away colours

Brujas F.C. was a Costa Rican football club, based in Desamparados, Costa Rica.

The name Brujas translates to Witches. The team's home town used to be Escazú, known around the country as "La ciudad de las Brujas" or "The Witches' Town", but the franchise later transferred to Desamparados. The team was dissolved in July 2011.

== History ==
=== A.D. Guanacasteca ===
The club was founded in 2004 as Brujas de Escazú when they took over the Asociación Deportiva Guanacasteca (A.D. Guanacasteca or ADG) licence to play in the Primera División de Costa Rica. Guanacasteca, known as Los Pamperos, were founded on 3 March 1973 as Nicoya F.C. but were renamed when they made their debut in the second division in 1974; they were once more renamed Sociedad Deportiva Guanacasteca in 2001. Guanacasteca were crowned Second Division champions 4 times, in 1975, 1985, 1995 and 2002.
In 2005, ADG was reestablished after buying Ciudad Colón's second division franchise.

=== Brujas de Escazú ===
The newly founded team was subsequently moved from Nicoya, where they played at the Estadio Chorotega, in Guanacaste to Escazú in an attempt to get more support from fans. Club president Percy Chamberlain kept Uruguayan manager Hernán Fernando Sosa, who had taken Guanacasteca to 4th place in the previous season, at the helm but he was eventually dismissed in September 2004 and replaced by compatriot Carlos Blanco on an interim basis and later Manuel Keosseián. By June 2005, the team had signed one of the best coaches from the 2004 tournament, Colombian coach Carlos Restrepo and they played in the National Stadium of Costa Rica. In September 2005, Chamberlain was replaced as president of the club by former Saprissa president Mínor Vargas and Restrepo was released from his managerial duties in May 2007 and club president Mínor Vargas replaced him with Mauricio Wright, who was a member of Costa Rica's 2002 World Cup national team.

=== Brujas F.C. ===
In summer 2007, the club moved again to play at the Estadio Jorge "Cuty" Monge in Desamparados and were renamed Brujas F.C. In December 2009 Brujas won the Invierno 2009 championship after beating Puntarenas in the final, which was the first to be decided on penalties in 38 years.

Wright was replaced by Luis Torres in May 2010 and in November 2010 club president Vargas resigned after it was claimed his company Grupo Ícono not only owned Brujas but also the then recently from the premier division expelled Barrio México. Vargas was arrested in the United States for alleged fraud with the PCI company in January 2011 and was found guilty to seven counts of fraud and three counts of money laundering in April 2012 and sentenced to 60 years in prison in October 2012.

In April 2011 the club's franchise was transferred to Orión, who continued to play at the Cuty Monge stadium, and acquired by Spaniard Juan Luis Hernández Fuertes. Hernández was later acquitted of charges pressed by the Vargas family over bad checks.

The club's supporters were known for using the now infamous phrase, Menores de lo que pensábamos (Smaller than we thought) as their official motto.

== Honours ==
=== Domestic ===
- Primera División de Costa Rica
  - Champions (1): Invierno 2009

== Championship Invierno 2009 ==
List of players and coaching staff who won the Costa Rica First Division National Soccer Championship on December 28, 2009.

Note: Flags indicate national team as defined under FIFA eligibility rules; some limited exceptions apply. Players may hold more than one non-FIFA nationality.

No.	Pos.	Nation	Player
1	GK	CRC	Luis Diego Sequeira
2	DF	CRC	Roy Smith
3	DF	CRC	Luis Pena
5	MF	CRC	Osman López
7	MF	CRC	Paolo Jiménez
8	MF	CRC	Danny Fonseca
9	MF	CRC	Pablo Brenes
10	MF	CRC	Yosimar Arias
11	MF	CRC	Allan Alemán
12	GK	CRC	Dany Carvajal
13	MF	CRC	Maykol Ortiz
14	MF	CRC	Rodolfo Rodríguez
16	DF	CRC	Jameson Scott
18	MF	CRC	Andrés Barquero
20	FW	ARG	Lucas Gómez
21	DF	CRC	Keilor Soto
23	DF	CRC	Tray Bennette (Captain)
25	FW	CRC	Daniel Jiménez

No.	Pos.	Nation	Player
27	DF	CRC	Héiner Mora
29	DF	CRC	Esteban Maitland
30	GK	CRC	Warner Hernández
32	MF	CRC	Randy Cubero
—	DF	CRC	Berny Peña
—	DF	CRC	James Scott
—	DF	CRC	Derrick Johnson
—	DF	CRC	Jason Scott
—	DF	CRC	Ariel Soto
—	DF	CRC	Brandón Poltronieri
—	DF	CRC	Sergei James
—	MF	CRC	Marlon Arias
—	MF	CRC	Daniel Varela
—	GK	CRC	Norberto Bonilla
—	FW	CRC	Bryan Vega
—	FW	CRC	Cristhiam Lagos
—	FW	CRC	Sergio Hernández
—	FW	CRC	Mynor Escoe
—	FW	CRC	Olman Vargas

=== History ===
After the 1964 campaign in which the Carmen FC team defeated Club Sport Uruguay de Coronado, there had been no finals without one of the 3 major teams in the league; Liga Deportiva Alajuelense, Club Sport Herediano and Deportivo Saprissa, until then, causing interest for the Costa Rican soccer fans. The match began at 7:05 p.m, with an attack to the front by the Buenos Aires team, but with no major breakthroughs. The first actions of proximity took place approximately 25 minutes later, and until the 37-minute mark when Luis Lara passed through the defenses, but the ball crashed into the vertical. In the second half the "shark" had gotten chances to score, but didn’t score yet. Similarly, the "sorcerers" attacked, but didn’t manage to score either. The first leg final didn’t cause much movement, especially since Brujas FC didn’t perform up to expectations like on the Municipal Pérez Zeledon and Liberia Mía. The team’s defining stake took place on Monday, December 28, 2009, at 2:00 p.m.

The return leg was played at the Jorge Hernán "Cuty" Monge Stadium in a contested game that welcomed 5,500 people; some had to seat in the yellow zones, and at least 150 more stayed outside the stadium. The game was very disputed in the first few minutes. Eventually, Puntarenas FC took the lead in the 13th minute through Luis Lara. The first half did not leave much to be said.

In the second half at minute 46' Daniel "naughty" Jiménez tied the game in a dressing room goal and would leave it that way until the end. The team from Desamparadeño won on penalties 5–4 with the failure of Josimar Arias in favor of Brujas FC and Mario Viquez together with Bryan Zamora for Puntarenas FC. With this, Brujas FC earned their first star on their shield, in other words their first national title.

== Historical list of coaches ==
- (Uruguay) Hernán Fernando Sosa (2004)
- (Uruguay) Carlos Blanco (September 2004)
- (Uruguay) Manuel Keosseián (September 2004 – March 2005)
- (Colombia) Carlos Restrepo (June 2005 – May 2007)
- (Costa Rica) Mauricio Wright (May 2007 – May 2010)
- (Costa Rica) José Luis Torres Mora (May 2010 – April 2011)
