= Asociación Deportiva Carmelita =

Costa Rican football club

Carmelita
- Full name: Asociación Deportiva Carmelita
- Nicknames: El Carmen; Los Carmelos
- Founded: October 20, 1948; 77 years ago
- Ground: Rafael Bolaños; Stadium, Alajuela, Costa Rica
- Capacity: 2,400
- Chairman: Edgar Artavia
- Manager: Alexander Vargas
- League: Liga de Ascenso
- Clausura 2022: 3° – Group A
Home colours	Away colours

Asociación Deportiva Carmelita is a Costa Rican football team playing in the Segunda División. The team is based in Barrio El Carmen, Alajuela, Costa Rica and their home stadium is Rafael Bolaños Stadium in El Coyol, Alajuela

== History ==
=== El Carmen ===
Founded as Costa Rica on 20 October 1948 by Manuel Guillén Fernández, the club joined the Costa Rican Third Division in 1949 and changed its name to Carmen Asociación Deportiva or just El Carmen de Alajuela a year later. They spent a few years in that league before reaching the second division in 1953 and on 9 April 1958 they debuted in the Primera División de Costa Rica against Alajuelense.

=== 1961 League title dispute ===
They won one championship in 1961, when the big clubs left the Federación Costarricense de Fútbol and founded their own ASOFUTBOL league and the title was contested between three club only: Carmen, Uruguay de Coronado and Gimnástica Española. However, the ASOFUTBOL teams returned to the league and their league winners Herediano were named champions only to recognize Carmen's title 40 years later.

=== Carmelita ===
From 1968 through 1975 they played in the third tier of the Costa Rican football pyramid again and from 1975 through 1991 they were in the second division except for one season in the top division in 1983. Renamed Carmelita, they won promotion to the Premier Division after Pérez Zeledón and Generaleña merged. In 2009 they dropped down again after 16 years in the Primera, only to bounce back again in summer 2012 after beating Orión in a promotion/relegation play-off.

== Stadium ==
In 2017, the construction and remodeling of a soccer field suitable for First Division matches began, and finally that same year the works for the installation of the artificial turf and the bleachers that will have capacity for around 2,400 people were concluded., to the south from the city of Alajuela. After its inauguration, it was baptized with the name of Rafael Bolaños Stadium, who administers the Wílmer “El Pato” López Sports Complex, where the facilities are located. The stadium was used for the first time in the 2018 Clausura Championship on January 21, 2018 in the Carmelita Sports Association match against Pérez Zeledón, with a score of 0-1 in favor of the visitors.

== Honours ==
- Primera División de Costa Rica: 1

1961

== Current squad ==
As of July 30, 2023

Note: Flags indicate national team as defined under FIFA eligibility rules; some limited exceptions apply. Players may hold more than one non-FIFA nationality.

No.	Pos.	Nation	Player
2	DF	CRC	Sergio Rosales
3	DF	CRC	Cedric Solano
4	DF	CRC	Fernando Brenes
5	DF	CRC	Antonio Aguilar
8	DF	CRC	Jose Garro (Captain)
7	MF	CRC	Sebastián Castro
6	MF	CRC	Danny Arroyo
9	FW	CRC	Bryan Jiménez
10	FW	CRC	Luis Campos
11	FW	CRC	Fernando Rodriguez

No.	Pos.	Nation	Player
14	FW	MEX	Salvador González
15	MF	CRC	Ignacio Quesada
16	MF	CRC	Juan Pablo Arce
17	MF	CRC	Jose Pablo González
18	MF	VEN	Víctor Pérez
19	MF	CRC	Junior Dávila
22	DF	CRC	Endrick Alvarado
24	MF	CRC	Carlos Umaña
28	DF	CRC	John Jairo Lara
30	GK	CRC	Jose Daniel Rojas

== Historic scorers ==
- Carlos Wanchope 34 goals
- Marcelo Donato Bruno 31 goals
- Bryan Rojas 19 goals
- David Diach 13 goals
- Alejandro Sequeira 12 goals
- Minor Díaz 10 goals
- Alejandro Aguilar 10 goals

== Championship 1961 ==
List of players and coaching staff who won the Costa Rica First Division National Soccer Championship on August 6, 1961 under the name of Carmen Fútbol Club.

Note: Flags indicate national team as defined under FIFA eligibility rules; some limited exceptions apply. Players may hold more than one non-FIFA nationality.

No.	Pos.	Nation	Player
—		CRC	José Francisco Fonseca
—		CRC	Jorge Luis Segura
—		CRC	Joaquín Bernardo Guillén
—		CRC	Demetrio Molina
—		CRC	Francisco Young
—		CRC	Gilberto Dormond
—		CRC	Jorge Bolaños
—		CRC	Luis Alberto Miranda
—		CRC	Álvaro Araya
—		CRC	Chucheca Álvarez
—		CRC	Arturo Herrera
—		CRC	Eduardo Bato Montero

No.	Pos.	Nation	Player
—		CRC	Francisco Solera
—		CRC	José Luis Vargas
—		CRC	Daniel Salmerón
—		CRC	José Chito Soto
—		CRC	Walter Casorla
—		CRC	Marco Tulio Bravo
—		CRC	Marcial Dijeres
—		CRC	José Rafael Villalobos
—		CRC	Guillermo Memo Elizondo
—		CRC	Rodrigo Obando
—		CRC	Carlos Morales

=== History ===
Barely 13 years after its official foundation, on November 20, 1948, Carmen FC de Alajuela won the first division title in 1961, organized by the National Football Federation (today the Costa Rican Football Federation, Fedefútbol), after a two-round triangular that was awarded without losing to Club Sport Uruguay, from Coronado, and the Sociedad Gimnástica Española.

In that short competition, the purslane reached the Major League championship with seven points won out of a possible eight (87.5% return), product of three wins and one draw in four games, with nine goals for and three against.

Monarchs were crowned on August 6, 1961, when they defeated Uruguay 2-1 at the National Stadium in San José. It was the last Tico club that reached the title as an unbeaten team.

The scoring leadership was shared between two Carmelite figures, Jorge Bolaños and José Chito Soto, along with Eduardo Pachuco Meléndez, from Club Sport Uruguay de Coronado, all with three conquests.

At the same time, in one of the biggest internal conflicts in local football in its history, there were five dissident clubs – Liga Deportiva Alajuelense, Club Sport Herediano, Club Sport Cartaginés, Deportivo Saprissa and Orión FC – who left the Federation and founded the Association National Football (Asofutbol), endorsed by the General Directorate of Sports.

This tournament was won by Herediano with 25 points obtained from 32 in dispute in 16 games (yield of 78%). So there were then two monarchs in that year.

The purslane club underwent a transformation in 1992, when Generaleña merged with Pérez Zeledón, monarch of the Second Division, so the vacancy in the highest category was filled by Carmen FC, which changed its name: Carmelite Sports Association.

Later, the Carmelos waged a lengthy legal claim to be credited with the 1961 title. Finally, in 2003, the Union of First Division Clubs (Unafut) recognized Carmelita and Herediano as winners of each contest, the first in the Federation and the second of the Asofutbol.
