= Segunda División de Costa Rica =

Costa Rican association football league

Segunda Division
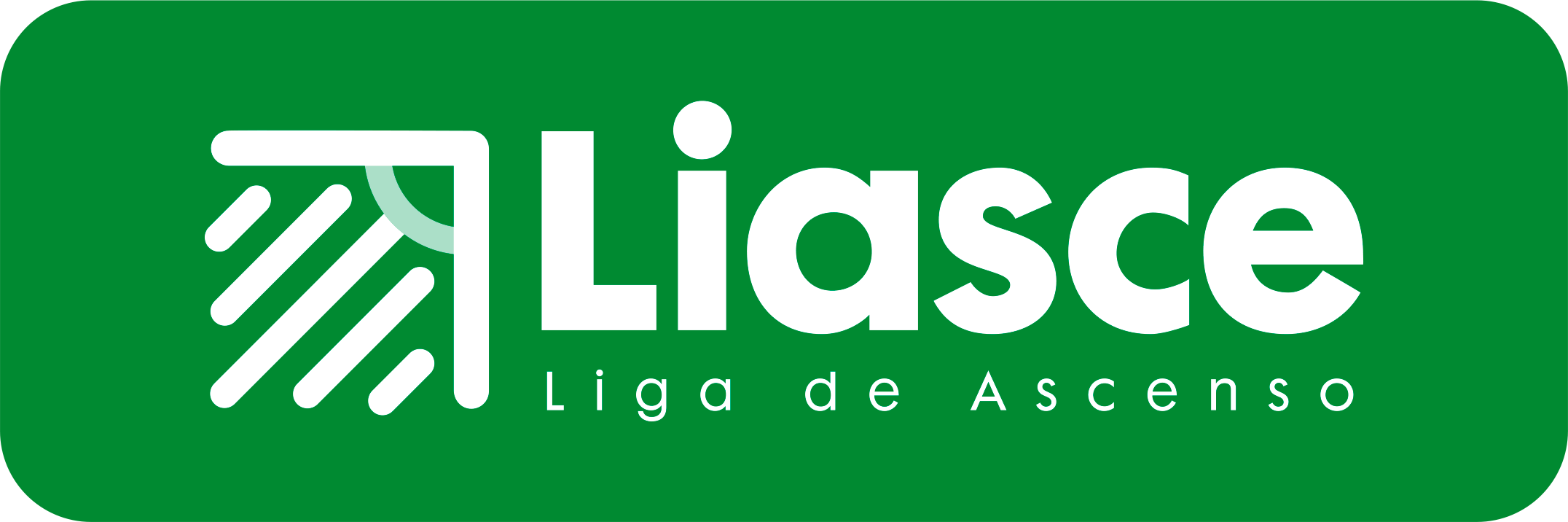
- Founded: 1921; 105 years ago
- Country: Costa Rica
- Confederation: CONCACAF
- Number of clubs: 17
- Level on pyramid: 2
- Promotion to: Liga Promerica
- Relegation to: LINAFA
- Sponsor: Transcomer
- Website: liasce.com
- Current: 2024–2025

Costa Rican Second Division (also known as Liga Transcomer for sponsorship reasons) is a professional league incorporated in 1921 for association football clubs in Costa Rica. It is the country's second-tier/division football competition, which is contested by 18 clubs and operates by a system of promotion and relegation.

== History ==
Many teams for Costa Rican soccer have passed through this division, such as Liga Deportiva Alajuelense, C.S. Cartagines, C.S. Liberty, C.S. Uruguay de Coronado, Orión F.C., Municipal Puntarenas and Deportivo Barrio México. The second division has been called over the years as the First Division "B" for Ascent and the Major League of Soccer.

The first Second Division championship was held in 1921. The Moravia Sports Union was the winner of that contest, which was only participatory until 1934. From 1935 to 1963, the Second Division champion played a promotion league with the last place in the First division. The Second Division teams lost that league in all cases except Uruguay in 1949; Moravia, in 1950 and Deportivo Nicolás Marín (currently Barrio México) in 1963 that did manage to win it and ascend. From 1964 and to date, the champion of the Second Division is promoted directly to the First Division. From 1987 to 2003, the winners of the semifinals faced each other home and away for the chance to be promoted to the First Division.. In 2003, the system of short tournaments was established, in which the winners of the opening and closing finals of each year compete in a final series for promotion in a home and way format.

== Promotion history ==
List of teams that have won their right to play the championship in the Costa Rican First Division.

| Season | Team |
|---|---|
| 1921 | U.D. Moravia |
| 1922 | C.S. La Libertad |
| 1923 | C.S. La Libertad |
| 1924 | C.S. Guadalupe |
| 1925 | C.S. Independencia |
| 1926 | Juventud de Mata Redonda |
| 1927 | A.D. Santo Domingo |
| 1928 | C.S. México |
| 1929 | Orión F.C. |
| 1930 | C.S. La Libertad |
| 1931 | Buenos Aires F.C. |
| 1932 | A.D. Alajuela Junior |
| 1933 | C.S. La Libertad |
| 1934 | C.S. La Libertad |
| 1935 | C.S. Cartaginés |
| 1936 | C.S. Herediano |
| 1937 | La Unión de Tres Ríos |
| 1938 | Orión F.C. |
| 1939 | C.S. La Libertad |
| 1940 | Liga Deportiva Alajuelense |
| 1941 | Orión F.C. |
| 1942 | C.S. Uruguay de Coronado |
| 1943 | Sindicato del Calzado |
| 1944 | U.D. Moravia |
| 1945 | Club Atlético Álvarez |
| 1946 | Rohrmoser F.C. |
| 1947 | Rohrmoser F.C. |
| 1948 | Deportivo Saprissa |
| 1949 | C.S. Uruguay de Coronado |
| 1950 | U.D. Moravia |
| 1951 | No determined champion |
| 1952 | Nicolás Marín |
| 1953 | C.S. Guadalupe |
| 1954 | No determined champion |
| 1955 | C.S. Guadalupe |
| 1956 | No determined champion |
| 1957 | Carmen F.C. |
| 1958 | Orión F.C. |
| 1959 | C.S. La Libertad |
| 1960 | C.S. Uruguay de Coronado |
| 1961 | Nicolás Marín |
| 1962 | Nicolás Marín |
| 1963 | Nicolás Marín |
| 1964 | Municipal Turrialba |
| 1965 | A.D. San Carlos |
| 1966 | Nicolás Marín |
| 1967 | A.D. Ramonense |
| 1968 | C.S. Uruguay de Coronado |
| 1969 | Municipal Turrialba |
| 1970 | Rohrmoser F.C. |
| 1971 | Limón F.C. |
| 1972 | Municipal Turrialba |
| 1973 | C.F. Universidad de Costa Rica |
| 1974 | Municipal Turrialba |
| 1975 | A.D. Guanacasteca |
| 1976 | A.D.M. Puntarenas |
| 1977 | A.D. San Carlos |
| 1978 | A.D. San Carlos |
| 1979 | A.D. San Miguel |
| 1980 | Municipal San José |
| 1981 | A.D. Sagrada Familia |
| 1982 | Carmen F.C. |
| 1983 | C.S. Cartaginés |
| 1984 | Municipal Curridabat |
| 1985 | A.D. Guanacasteca |
| 1986 | Municipal Curridabat |
| 1987 | C.S. Uruguay de Coronado |
| 1988 | A.D. Palmares |
| 1989 | A.D. Generaleña |
| 1990 | No determined champion |
| 1990–91 | Municipal Pérez Zeledón |
| 1991–92 | A.D. Ramonense |
| 1992–93 | A.D. Belén |
| 1993–94 | A.D. Sagrada Familia |
| 1994–95 | A.D. Guanacasteca |
| 1995–96 | A.D.M. Goicoechea |
| 1996–97 | A.D. Santa Bárbara |
| 1997–98 | A.D. Limonense |
| 1998–99 | Santos de Guápiles |
| 1999–2000 | A.D. Municipal Osa |
| 2000–01 | Municipal Liberia |
| 2001–02 | A.D. Guanacasteca |
| 2002–03 | A.D. Ramonense |
| 2003–04 | A.D. Belén |
| 2004–05 | A.D. Santacruceña |
| 2005–06 | A.D. San Carlos |
| 2006–07 | C.F. Universidad de Costa Rica |
| 2007–08 | A.D. Ramonense |
| 2008–09 | Santos de Guápiles |
| 2009–10 | Limón F.C. |
| 2010–11 | A.D. Belén |
| 2011–12 | C.S. Uruguay de Coronado |
| 2012–13 | C.F. Universidad de Costa Rica |
| 2013–14 | A.S. Puma |
| 2014–15 | Municipal Liberia |
| 2015–16 | A.D. San Carlos |
| 2016–17 | Municipal Grecia |
| 2017–18 | A.D. San Carlos |
| 2018–19 | Jicaral Sercoba |
| 2019–20 | Sporting F.C. |
| 2020–21 | A.D. Guanacasteca |
| 2021–22 | Puntarenas F.C. |
| 2022–23 | Municipal Liberia |
| 2023–24 | Santa Ana F.C. |
| 2024–25 | Guadalupe F.C. |
