= Sociedad Gimnástica Española de San José =

Gimnástica Española
- Full name: Sociedad Gimnástica Española
- Nickname(s): Los Diablos Rojos
- Founded: 11 June 1911
- Ground: San José, Costa Rica
- pattern_la1=
Home colours

The Sociedad Gimnástica Española was a football club based in San José, Costa Rica.

== History ==
Founded in 1911, Sociedad Gimnástica Española debuted in the Primera División de Costa Rica on 17 July 1921 against Gimnástica Limonense and played 39 seasons at the top level until their final season in 1961, when they were relegated after the ASOFUTBOL league split.

In 2007, Spanish native Ceferino Casero started a project to revive the club for the Spanish community in Costa Rica.

== Honours ==
- Costa Rican Primera División
  - Runners-up (7): 1921, 1928, 1930, 1933, 1937, 1938, 1942
