= Liga FPD =

Costa Rican association football league

Liga Promerica
- Founded: 13 June 1921; 105 years ago
- Country: Costa Rica
- Confederation: CONCACAF
- Number of clubs: 10
- Level on pyramid: 1
- Relegation to: Liga de Ascenso
- Domestic cup: Costa Rican Cup
- International cup(s): Regional; CONCACAF Central American Cup; Continental; CONCACAF Champions Cup
- Current champions: Herediano (32nd title) (2026 Clausura)
- Most championships: Saprissa (40 titles)
- Broadcasters: FUTV; Tigo Sports; TD+
- Website: unafut.com
- Current: 2025–26 Liga FPD

The Primera División of Costa Rica, commonly known as Liga de Fútbol de Primera División (Liga FPD), and Liga Promerica for sponsorship reasons, is the top professional association football division in Costa Rica. It is administered by the Unión de Clubes de Fútbol de la Primera División (UNAFUT). The league consists of 10 teams, with the last-placed team relegated to the Liga de Ascenso.

The league was founded in 1921, with Herediano crowned as the first champions. Saprissa is the most successful club having won the championship a record 40 times. Together with Alajuelense (31 titles)and Herediano (32 titles)they have dominated the league.

== Competition format ==
Former logo

The Liga FPD features a format in which two separate tournaments are held over the course of one particular season. The Torneo de Apertura (Spanish for "Opening Tournament") lasts from July to December, while the Torneo de Clausura (Spanish for "Closing Tournament") lasts from January to May. From 2007 to 2017, these were known respectively as Torneo de Invierno ("Winter Tournament") and Torneo de Verano ("Summer Tournament"), based on the Costa Rican seasons, with the Invierno tournament played during the rainy season and the Verano tournament played during the dry season.

A separate tournament is played on stages. The first stage follows the usual double round-robin format. During the course of a tournament, each club plays every other club twice, once at home and once away, for a total of 22 matchdays. Teams receive three points for a win, one point for a draw, and no points for a loss. Teams are ranked by total points, with the top-four clubs at the end of the stage qualifying to the second stage. The second stage consists of a quadrangular in which the best four teams qualified will face each other twice again, adding 6 additional matchdays. If the top team of the first stage also wins the quadrangular, the club will be crowned as champions; otherwise, a double-legged final will be played between the winners of the first stage and the winners of the quadrangular to determine the champion.

=== Promotion and relegation ===
A system of promotion and relegation exists between the Primera División and the Segunda División. In spite of having two champions during a regular season, the Liga FPD only relegates one team per season based on the aggregate performance in both Apertura and Clausura tournaments. The last-placed team in the aggregate table is relegated to the Liga de Ascenso.

=== Qualifying for CONCACAF competitions ===
The top teams in the Liga FPD qualify to the CONCACAF Champions League. Starting in the 2017–18 season, the CONCACAF Champions League will be separated into two stages. The first stage is CONCACAF League, which consists of sixteen teams from Central America and the Caribbean, in which the winner qualifies to the second stage, the Champions League, joining other fifteen teams. Because of this format, the qualification criteria in the Liga FPD are:

- If one team wins both the Apertura and Clausura tournaments
  - The double champion will qualify directly to the second stage of the Champions League
  - The two non-champion teams with the best aggregate record at the end of the season will qualify to the CONCACAF League
- If two teams are crowned champions over the season
  - The champion with the best aggregate record will qualify directly to the second stage of the Champions League
  - The champion with the worst aggregate record will qualify to the CONCACAF League
  - The non-champion team with the best aggregate record will qualify to the CONCACAF League

== History ==
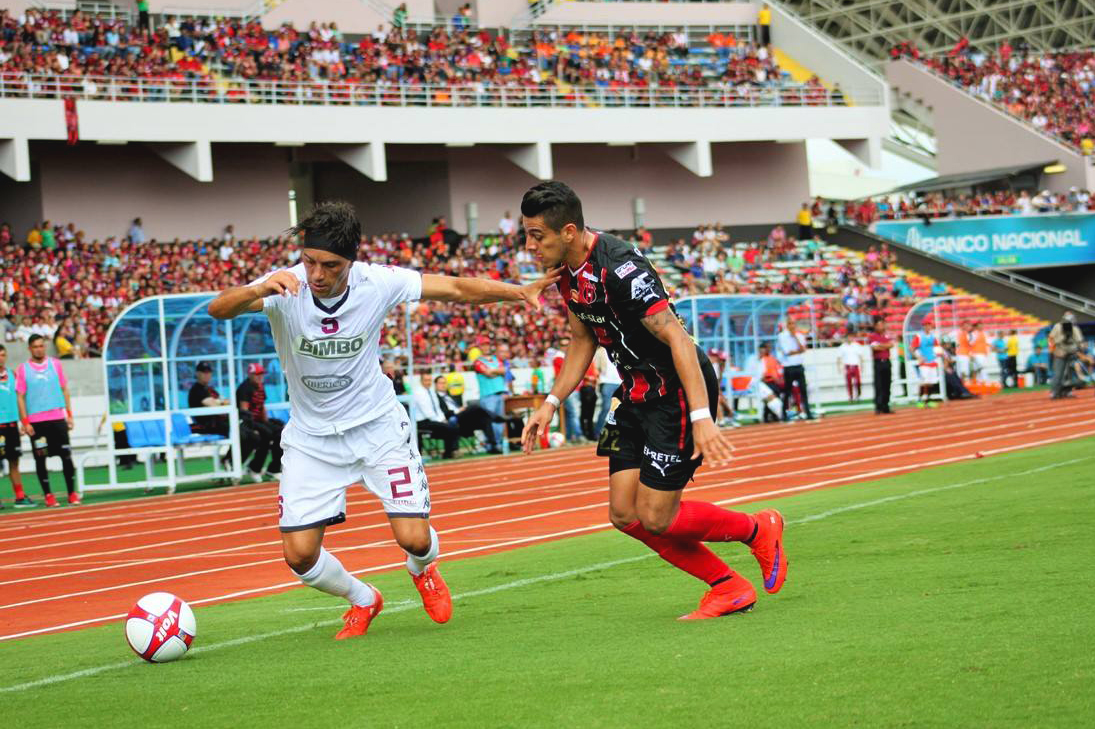
Saprissa's Christian Bolaños disputes the ball against Alajuelense's Rónald Matarrita. Alajuelense and Saprissa have the biggest rivalry in the league, known as El Clásico

On 13 June 1921, the Costa Rican Football Federation was created. With its creation, the need of a tournament also emerged, along with the establishment of a national team, as a result of Costa Rica being invited to the 1921 Juegos del Centenario in Guatemala.

The first season of the Costa Rican Primera División was played in 1921 with seven teams: Alajuelense, Cartaginés, Herediano, La Libertad, Sociedad Gimnástica Española, Sociedad Gimnástica Limonense and La Unión de Tres Ríos. La Libertad and Gimnástica Limonense played the first ever match of the Liga FPD, with La Libertad emerging victorious with a lone goal scored by Rafael Madrigal. Herediano were crowned as champions.

In 1999, the Costa Rican Football Federation created the UNAFUT (acronym of Unión de Clubes de Fútbol de la Primera División), an entity designed for the organization and administration of the Primera División tournament and its youth leagues (known as Alto Rendimiento).

On 9 January 2014, UNAFUT decided to rename the tournament to Liga FPD, in order to give more identity to the league.

The main rivalry in the league is El Clásico, played by Alajuelense and Saprissa, as both teams are the most successful in the league and both share the vast majority of followers throughout the country. Since their first encounter at the old national stadium on 12 October 1949, the two teams have faced each other in over 300 matches, with the winning balance in favor of Saprissa.

== Clubs 2025-26 ==
Location of clubs in 2025-26 season
Location of clubs in San José province

Team	Location	Stadium	Capacity	Founded
Alajuelense	Alajuela, Alajuela	Alejandro Morera Soto	17,895	1919
Cartaginés	Cartago, Cartago	José Rafael "Fello" Meza	13,500	1906
Herediano	Heredia, Heredia	Eladio Rosabal Cordero (Note: Herediano is temporarily playing at Estadio "Colleya" Fonseca in Guadalupe, San José while their home stadium undergoes renovation)	8,068	1921
Guadalupe	Guadalupe, San José	"Colleya" Fonseca	4,500	2017
Liberia	Liberia, Guanacaste	Edgardo Baltodano	6,500	1977
Pérez Zeledón	San Isidro de El General, San José	Estadio Municipal	3,259	1991
Puntarenas F.C.	Puntarenas, Puntarenas	Estadio Lito Pérez	4,105	2004
San Carlos	Ciudad Quesada, Alajuela	Carlos Ugalde Álvarez	4,080	1965
Saprissa	San Juan de Tibás, San José	Ricardo Saprissa	23,112	1935
Sporting F.C.	Pavas, San José	Ernesto Rohrmoser	3,000	2016

== Champions ==
Ed.	Season	Champion	Runner-up
1	1921	Herediano	Gimnástica Española
2	1922	Herediano	La Libertad
3	1923	Cartaginés	La Libertad
4	1924	Herediano	Cartaginés
5	1925	La Libertad	Herediano
6	1926	La Libertad	Cartaginés
7	1927	Herediano	La Libertad
8	1928	Alajuelense	Gimnástica Española
9	1929	La Libertad	Alajuelense
10	1930	Herediano	Gimnástica Española
11	1931	Herediano	Orión
12	1932	Herediano	Orión
13	1933	Herediano	Gimnástica Española
14	1934	La Libertad	Alajuela Junior
15	1935	Herediano	Alajuela Junior
16	1936	Cartaginés	La Libertad
17	1937	Herediano	Gimnástica Española
18	1938	Orión	Gimnástica Española
19	1939	Alajuelense	Herediano
20	1940	Cartaginés	Orión
21	1941	Alajuelense	La Libertad
22	1942	La Libertad	Gimnástica Española
23	1943	Universidad de Costa Rica	Alajuelense
24	1944	Orión	Herediano
25	1945	Alajuelense	Orión
26	1946	La Libertad	Herediano
27	1947	Herediano	La Libertad
28	1948	Herediano	Alajuelense
29	1949	Alajuelense	Orión
30	1950	Alajuelense	Saprissa
31	1951	Herediano	Orión
32	1952	Saprissa	Alajuelense
33	1953	Saprissa	Herediano
34	1954	No tournament.	
35	1955	Herediano	Saprissa
36	1956	No tournament.	
37	1957	Saprissa	Alajuelense
38	1958	Alajuelense	Saprissa
39	1959	Alajuelense	Saprissa
40	1960	Alajuelense	Herediano
41	1961 Asofútbol	Herediano	Saprissa
42	1961 Fedefútbol	Carmelita	Uruguay de Coronado
43	1962	Saprissa	Alajuelense
44	1963	Uruguay de Coronado	Saprissa
45	1964	Saprissa	Orión
46	1965	Saprissa	Alajuelense
47	1966	Alajuelense	Saprissa
48	1967	Saprissa	Alajuelense
49	1968	Saprissa	Cartaginés
50	1969	Saprissa	Alajuelense
51	1970	Alajuelense	Saprissa
52	1971	Alajuelense	Saprissa
53	1972	Saprissa	Alajuelense
54	1973	Saprissa	Cartaginés
55	1974	Saprissa	Herediano
56	1975	Saprissa	Cartaginés
57	1976	Saprissa	Deportivo México
58	1977	Saprissa	Cartaginés
59	1978	Herediano	Municipal Puntarenas
60	1979	Herediano	Cartaginés
61	1980	Alajuelense	Herediano
62	1981	Herediano	Limonense
63	1982	Saprissa	Municipal Puntarenas
64	1983	Alajuelense	Municipal Puntarenas
65	1984	Alajuelense	Saprissa
66	1985	Herediano	Alajuelense
67	1986	Municipal Puntarenas	Alajuelense
68	1987	Herediano	Cartaginés
69	1988	Saprissa	Herediano
70	1989	Saprissa	Alajuelense
71	1990	No tournament.	
72	1990–91	Alajuelense	Saprissa
73	1991–92	Alajuelense	Saprissa
74	1992–93	Herediano	Cartaginés
75	1993–94	Saprissa	Alajuelense
76	1994–95	Saprissa	Alajuelense
77	1995–96	Alajuelense	Cartaginés
78	1996–97	Alajuelense	Saprissa
79	1997–98	Saprissa	Alajuelense
80	1998–99	Saprissa	Alajuelense
81	1999–00	Alajuelense	Saprissa
82	2000–01	Alajuelense	Herediano
83	2001–02	Alajuelense	Santos de Guápiles
84	2002–03	Alajuelense	Saprissa
85	2003–04	Saprissa	Herediano
86	2004–05	Alajuelense	Pérez Zeledón
87	2005–06	Saprissa	Puntarenas F.C.
88	2006–07	Saprissa	Alajuelense
89	2007 Invierno	Saprissa	Herediano
90	2008 Verano	Saprissa	Alajuelense
91	2008 Invierno	Saprissa	Alajuelense
92	2009 Verano	Liberia Mía	Herediano
93	2009 Invierno	Brujas	Puntarenas F.C.
94	2010 Verano	Saprissa	San Carlos
95	2010 Invierno	Alajuelense	Herediano
96	2011 Verano	Alajuelense	San Carlos
97	2011 Invierno	Alajuelense	Herediano
98	2012 Verano	Herediano	Santos de Guápiles
99	2012 Invierno	Alajuelense	Herediano
100	2013 Verano	Herediano	Cartaginés
101	2013 Invierno	Alajuelense	Herediano
102	2014 Verano	Saprissa	Alajuelense
103	2014 Invierno	Saprissa	Herediano
104	2015 Verano	Herediano	Alajuelense
105	2015 Invierno	Saprissa	Alajuelense
106	2016 Verano	Herediano	Alajuelense
107	2016 Invierno	Saprissa	Herediano
108	2017 Verano	Herediano	Saprissa
109	2017 Apertura	Pérez Zeledón	Herediano
110	2018 Clausura	Saprissa	Herediano
111	2018 Apertura	Herediano	Saprissa
112	2019 Clausura	San Carlos	Saprissa
113	2019 Apertura	Herediano	Alajuelense
114	2020 Clausura	Saprissa	Alajuelense
115	2020 Apertura	Alajuelense	Herediano
116	2021 Clausura	Saprissa	Herediano
117	2021 Apertura	Herediano	Saprissa
118	2022 Clausura	Cartaginés	Alajuelense
119	2022 Apertura	Saprissa	Herediano
120	2023 Clausura	Saprissa	Alajuelense
121	2023 Apertura	Saprissa	Herediano
122	2024 Clausura	Saprissa	Alajuelense
123	2024 Apertura	Herediano	Alajuelense
124	2025 Clausura	Herediano	Alajuelense
125	2025 Apertura	Alajuelense	Saprissa
126	2026 Clausura	Herediano	Saprissa

== Performance by club ==
Rank	Club	Winners	Runners-up	Winning years
1	Saprissa	40	23	1952, 1953, 1957, 1962, 1964, 1965, 1967, 1968, 1969, 1972, 1973, 1974, 1975, 1976, 1977, 1982, 1988, 1989, 1993–94, 1994–95, 1997–98, 1998–99, 2003–04, 2005–06, 2006–07, 2007 Invierno, 2008 Verano, 2008 Invierno, 2010 Verano, 2014 Verano, 2014 Invierno, 2015 Invierno, 2016 Invierno, 2018 Clausura, 2020 Clausura, 2021 Clausura, 2022 Apertura, 2023 Clausura, 2023 Apertura, 2024 Clausura
2	Herediano	32	25	1921, 1922, 1924, 1927, 1930, 1931, 1932, 1933, 1935, 1937, 1947, 1948, 1951, 1955, 1961 Asofútbol, 1978, 1979, 1981, 1985, 1987, 1992–93, 2012 Verano, 2013 Verano, 2015 Verano, 2016 Verano, 2017 Verano, 2018 Apertura, 2019 Apertura, 2021 Apertura, 2024 Apertura, 2025 Clausura, 2026 Clausura
3	Alajuelense	31	31	1928, 1939, 1941, 1945, 1949, 1950, 1958, 1959, 1960, 1966, 1970, 1971, 1980, 1983, 1984, 1990–91, 1991–92, 1995–96, 1996–97, 1999–00, 2000–01, 2001–02, 2002–03, 2004–05, 2010 Invierno, 2011 Verano, 2011 Invierno, 2012 Invierno, 2013 Invierno, 2020 Apertura, 2025 Apertura
4	La Libertad	6	6	1925, 1926, 1929, 1934, 1942, 1946
5	Cartaginés	4	11	1923, 1936, 1940, 2022 Clausura
6	Orión	2	7	1938, 1944
7	Municipal Puntarenas	1	3	1986
7	San Carlos	1	2	2019 Clausura
7	Uruguay de Coronado	1	1	1963
7	Pérez Zeledón	1	1	2017 Apertura
7	Universidad de Costa Rica	1	0	1943
7	Carmelita	1	0	1961 Fedefútbol
7	Liberia Mía	1	0	2009 Verano
7	Brujas	1	0	2009 Invierno

== Player records ==
=== Top scorers ===
Rank	Nat.	Player	Goals
1	(Costa Rica)	Victor Núñez Rodríguez	246
2	(Costa Rica)	Errol Daniels	196
3	(Costa Rica)	Jonathan McDonald	183
4	(Costa Rica)	Roy Sáenz	168
5	(Costa Rica)	Álvaro Saborio	167
6	(Costa Rica)	Leonel Hernández	164
7	(Costa Rica)	Guillermo Guardia	149
8	(Costa Rica)	Evaristo Coronado	148
9	(Costa Rica)	Alejandro Alpízar	147
9	(Costa Rica)	Erick Scott	147
11	(Costa Rica)	Juan Ulloa	140
12	(Costa Rica)	Vicente Wanchope	133

=== Most appearances ===
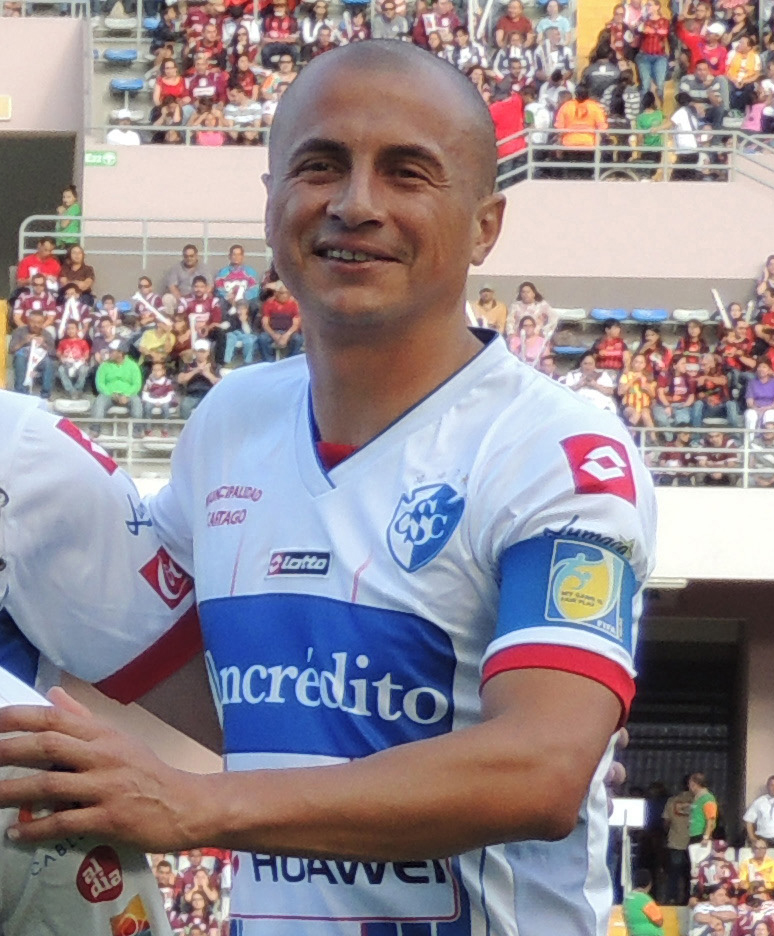
Danny Fonseca is the fourth most capped player in the Liga FPD

Rank	Nat.	Player	Years	Apps
1	(Costa Rica)	Marvin Obando	1979–2000	685
2	(Costa Rica)	Julio Fuller	1975–1994	684
3	(Costa Rica)	Enrique Díaz	1977–1996	676
4	(Costa Rica)	Danny Fonseca	1999–2018	656
5	(Costa Rica)	Allen Guevara	2008–	625
6	(Costa Rica)	Félix Montoya	1999–2019	619
7	(Costa Rica)	Óscar Granados	2004–2022	608
8	(Costa Rica)	Marvin Angulo	2006–	606
9	(Costa Rica)	Luis Diego Arnáez	1987–2005	579
10	(Costa Rica)	Keilor Soto	2001–2021	576
11	(Costa Rica)	Mauricio Montero	1980–1990	557
12	(Costa Rica)	Wílmer López	1992–2009	550
13	(Costa Rica)	Óscar Ramírez	1983–1999	542
14	(Costa Rica)	Evaristo Coronado	1981–1995	536
15	(Costa Rica)	Luis Quirós	1986–2000	531
