= Puntarenas F.C. =

Association football club in Costa Rica

Puntarenas
- Full name: Puntarenas Fútbol Club
- Nicknames: Areneros; Chuchequeros; Naranjas (Oranges); Porteños; Tiburones (The Sharks); Fuerza Naranja
- Founded: 30 June 2004; 22 years ago
- Ground: Estadio Lito Pérez
- Capacity: 4,105
- Chairman: Héctor Trejos
- Manager: Cesar Alpizar
- League: Liga Promerica
- Clausura 2023: 10°
- Website: www.puntarenasfc.com
Home colours	Away colours

Puntarenas Fútbol Club S.A.D. is a Costa Rican football club, currently competing in the Primera División de Costa Rica.

The team plays its home games in the Estadio Municipal de Puntarenas Miguel Ángel "Lito" Pérez Treacy nicknamed "La Olla Mágica" ("The Magic Cauldron") in Puntarenas Centro, Puntarenas Province, Costa Rica, known by that name because of the high temperatures of the zone and the unstopping support from the fans along the games.

== History ==
=== A.D. Municipal Puntarenas ===
The club was founded in June 2004, by Adrián Castro Velásquez and Eduardo Li Sánchez and is basically a spinoff of the A.D. Municipal Puntarenas club, founded on January 9, 1952 which until 2001 had spent 34 seasons in the Primera División (UNAFUT). Municipal Puntarenas debuted in the Primera División on 19 April 1964 and won their first and only division title in the 1986–87 season against Alajuelense, they also finished second three more times. In 2002 Municipal Puntarenas was relegated to Liga de Ascenso, Segunda División (LIASCE) and in 2009 to third division Primera División de Liga Nacional de Futbol Aficionado (LINAFA).

=== A.D. Sánta Barbara franchise purchased ===
Municipal Puntarenas's relegation in 2001 and Municipal Osa's descent in 2003 left Puntarenas Province without a Primera División club so Li and Castro purchased the franchise of A.D. Santa Bárbara to restore the province's presence in the top tier.

Santa Bárbara had made their debut in the Primera in the 1997–98 season with 4th place being their best league result.

=== Puntarenas F.C. ===
Puntarenas F.C. counts with the supporter group "Estação La Samba Primeira" that brings cheers and music to the local games. Puntarenas F.C. played its first game on August 22, 2004, in Estadio Miguel "Lito" Pérez, beating Belén 2–1. They became one of the best teams in the Primera División, being in the first 3 places in their first 3 years as a new team, starting a rivalry with Saprissa and Alajuelense, the most successful teams in the country. According to IFFHS Club World Ranking, Puntarenas F.C. ranked 342 (285) in the World in 2007, making them one of the best squads in Costa Rica and in the UNCAF region.

On July 4, 2007, Eduardo Li Sánchez resigned as team owner and President to take over the reins of Federación Costarricense de Fútbol (FEDEFUTBOL) as president. Owner and Vice President Adrián Castro Velásquez became the club's new president and sole proprietor.

On December 9, 2008, it was announced that Alejandro Márquez, owner of Mexican second division football club Atlético Celaya had bought 50 percent of the shares of Puntarenas F.C. making it the second Costa Rican team with Mexican interest. Márquez was elected vice president.

On February 16, 2009, Adrián Castro Velásquez was assassinated as he left his house in Miramar de Montes de Oro en route to Puntarenas Centro, by a pair of hitman on a motorbike to settle a business dispute. As a result of Castro's tragic death, his wife María Alejandra Ordóñez Lucovich took over his half of the club's shares. The board of directors elected Adrian's son Marcelo Enrique Castro as second Vice President and Víctor Herrera as president.

On June 27, 2009, it was reported that Alejandro Márquez defaulted on his contract with the club. Alejandra Ordóñez took full ownership, control of all club assets and the Presidency.

In 2009, Score One Soccer became equity partner of Puntarenas F.C. and was also granted a 10-year contract by Municipalidad de Puntarenas to operate Estadio Miguel "Lito" Pérez.

In April 2014, Puntarenas were relegated to the Second Division.

In May 2022, Puntarenas beat Carmelita 3–0 on aggregate to win the second division and ascend to Costa Rica's top flight for the first time since 2014.

== Honours ==
- UNCAF Interclub Cup
  - Winners (1): 2006

== Stadium ==
The stadium belongs to the municipality of Puntarenas and is used by the teams of the Liga Gatorade de Ascenso, Puntarenas Fútbol Club and Marineros de Puntarenas, in addition to the Third Division team, the Puntarenas San Luis Fútbol Club.

The stadium is being upgraded with lighting. The Municipality of Puntarenas plans to have the best lighting in all of Central America. According to the Ministry of Health, the recommended capacity is 4,105 spectators:

North or Shadow Grandstand: 1680 people

South Grandstand: 825 people

East Grandstand: 800 people

West Grandstand: 800 people

It has natural grass but the company Score One Soccer, which has shares of the Puntarenas Fútbol Club and will manage the stadium for 10 years, will remodel it. The dressing rooms and press areas of the stadium have already been remodeled. It is located 200 m. west of the Courts of Justice, on Avenida Centenario. Downtown Puntarenas.

== Current squad ==
As of 24 September 2026

Note: Flags indicate national team as defined under FIFA eligibility rules; some limited exceptions apply. Players may hold more than one non-FIFA nationality.

No.	Pos.	Nation	Player
2	DF	CRC	Walter Cortés
3	DF	CRC	Kevin Fajardo
5	MF	CRC	Yeltsin Tejeda
6	MF	CRC	Kevin Cabezas
7	MF	ARG	Lucas Comachi
8	MF	CRC	Ulises Segura
10	MF	CRC	Raheem Cole
11	MF	PAN	Randy Taylor
12	DF	CRC	Krisler Villalobos
14	MF	CRC	Amferny Sinclair
15	DF	MEX	Hiram Muñoz
17	DF	HON	Wesly Decas
20	MF	CRC	Berny Segura

No.	Pos.	Nation	Player
21	FW	CRC	Doryan Rodríguez
22	FW	CRC	Dariel Castrillo
25	DF	CRC	Kliver Gómez
26	MF	CRC	Jordy Hernández
29	MF	PAN	Vladimir Edghill
33	MF	CRC	Jaylon Hadden
35	GK	CRC	Daniel Rojas
40	FW	CRC	José López
41	DF	CRC	Derek Cordero
50	MF	CRC	Jaret Hernández
60	MF	CRC	José Leiva
77	FW	CRC	Pablo Álvarez
97	GK	NCA	Adonis Pineda

== A.D.M. Puntarenas ==
Players from Asociación Deportiva Municipal Puntarenas who won championship (1986–1987).

Note: Flags indicate national team as defined under FIFA eligibility rules; some limited exceptions apply. Players may hold more than one non-FIFA nationality.

No.	Pos.	Nation	Player
18	GK	CRC	Jorge Arturo Hidalgo
21	GK	CRC	Bismarck Duarte
31	GK	CRC	Hermidio Barrantes
—	DF	CRC	Alfredo “Diablo” Contreras
—	DF	CRC	Ricardo “Sardina” García
—	DF	CRC	Jorge Badilla
—	DF	CRC	Marvin Bustos
—	DF	CRC	Carlos Morales
—	DF	CRC	Carlos Nicanor Toppings
—	DF	CRC	Sergio Angulo
—	DF	CRC	Adolfo "El Coyolito" Rojas
—	DF	CRC	Marvin Huertas
—	DF	BRA	Carlo Iranil Carvalho Do Nascimento
—	MF	CRC	Sandro Alfaro
—	MF	CRC	Carlos Alberto “El Pistoncillo” Velásquez

No.	Pos.	Nation	Player
23	MF	CRC	Luis Enrique Galagarza
—	MF	CRC	Juan Carlos Aguirre
—	MF	CRC	Rodolfo Ramírez Binns
1	MF	CRC	Francisco Arias
10	MF	CRC	Juan Carlos Díaz
—	MF	CRC	Tomás Eduardo “El Pistón” Velásquez
4	MF	BRA	Kleber Ponce
9	FW	CRC	Leonidas “Leoni” Flores
—	FW	CRC	Gilberto Rhoden
—	FW	CRC	Didier Morales
—	FW	CRC	Roberto Stevanovich
—	FW	CRC	Danilo Anderson
—	FW	CRC	Donaldo Vega
—	FW	CRC	Franklin "El Chino" Vargas

== See also ==
- List of soccer clubs in Costa Rica
