= List of foreign Liga FPD players =

This is a list of foreign players in Liga FPD. The following players:

1. have played at least one official game for their respective clubs.
2. are listed as squad members for the current.
3. have not been capped for the Costa Rica national team at any level.
4. includes uncapped players with dual nationality.

In italic: Players currently signed, but have yet to play a league match.

In Bold: Current foreign Liga de Fútbol de Primera División. players and their present team.

== Naturalized players (Note: Players that have been born abroad, moved to Costa Rica later than the age of twelve, acquired Costa Rican citizenship and waived the opportunity to play for the national teams of their native countries in order to be eligible to play for Costa Rica) ==
- (El Salvador) Ricardo Saprissa – Orión F.C.
- (Brazil) Odir Jacques – Saprissa
- (Dominican Republic) Víctor Núñez – Alajuelense, Saprissa, Cartagines, Herediano, Liberia Mía, Santos de Guápiles
- (Nicaragua) Hernán Bolaños
- (Brazil) Nilton Nóbrega – Saprissa, Herediano
- (Brazil) Alexandre Guimaraes – Saprissa, Municipal Puntarenas, Turrialba

== Africa – CAF ==
=== Cameroon ===
- Alain Ekwe – Puntarenas
- Simon Pasteur – Liberia Mía

=== Congo (Republic of the Congo) ===
- Kanga Nzeza – Cartaginés

=== Equatorial Guinea ===
- Danny Quendambú – Herediano, UCR, San Carlos

=== Guinea ===
- Joao Johanning – Perez Zeledon, Club Sport Uruguay

=== Kenya ===
- Charles Otieno – Herediano
- Austin Makacha – Herediano
- Titus Mulama – Herediano

=== Sierra Leone ===
- Michael Tommy – Herediano, Belén, Puntarenas, Cartaginés, Liberia Mía

=== South Africa ===
- Kiki Kabanga – Cartaginés

== Asia – AFC ==
=== Iraq ===
- Yohan Salwan Zetuna - Municipal Grecia

== South America (CONMEBOL) ==
=== Argentina ===
- Santiago Aloi – Municipal Liberia
- Lautaro Ayala - Guadalupe
- Pablo Azcurra - Pérez Zeledón
- Maximiliano Badell – Herediano
- Lucio Barroca - Pérez Zeledón
- Patricio Gómez Barroche – Herediano
- Alejandro Cabral - Saprissa
- Jonathan Camio - Carmelita
- Facundo Crespo – Pérez Zeledón, Cartaginés
- Jorge Drovandi – Herediano
- Alexis Esparza – Cartaginés
- Hernan Fener – Cartaginés, Pérez Zeledón
- Gustavo Fernández – Saprissa
- José Luis García – Municipal Liberia
- Lucas Giovagnoli - Grecia
- Ismael Gómez - San Carlos, Jicaral
- Marcelo Gómez – Alajuelense
- Lucas Emanuel Gómez – Brujas, Alajuelense, Cartaginés
- Manuel González - San Carlos
- Nelson Emanuel González – Cartaginés
- Nicolás Hernández – Alajuelense
- Andrés Imperiale – Saprissa
- Pablo Alejandro Izaguirre – Alajuelense
- Daniel Juárez – Alajuelense
- Javier Liendo - Pérez Zeledón
- Esteban Espíndola López – Saprissa
- Adrián Mahía – Saprissa
- Diego Joaquín País – Pérez Zeledón, Cartaginés, San Carlos
- Leonel Peralta - Grecia
- Claudio Daniel Pérez - San Carlos
- Sebastián Pol – Cartaginés
- Leandro Gastón Rodríguez - Pérez Zeledón
- Emiliano Romay – Saprissa
- Rodrigo Salomón – Pérez Zeledón
- Héctor Sanabria – Pérez Zeledón
- Ariel Segalla – Cartaginés
- Juan Ignacio Sills – Alajuelense
- Fernando Gaston Soler – Pérez Zeledón
- Mariano Torres – Saprissa
- José Luis Zelaye – Cartaginés
- Facundo Zabala – Alajuelense

=== Bolivia ===
- Carlos Saucedo – Saprissa

=== Brazil ===
- Anderson Andrade Antunes – Brujas, Herediano, Alajuelense, Municipal Liberia, Cartaginés
- Paulo Cézar - Grecia
- Leandro da Silva – Alajuelense
- Iago Soares – Alajuelense
- Anderson Leite – Saprissa
- Rodinei Martins – Herediano, Alajuelense
- Ricardo Mion Varella Costa – Saprissa
- Luciano Xavier Cunha – Alajuelense
- Nilton Nóbrega – Herediano
- Marcelo Sarvas – Alajuelense
- Paulo César Rodrigues Lima – Brujas
- Leandro Barrios Rita dos Martires – Herediano, Alajuelense
- Adonis Hilario – Saprissa, Herediano, Guanacasteca
- Jorge Barbosa – Santos de Guápiles, Brujas, Puntarenas F.C., Cartaginés, Barrio México, UCR
- Rafael Gomes de Oliveira – Herediano
- Ismael Nery de Souza – Saprissa
- Pablo Rodrigues - Guanacasteca
- Kennedy Rocha Pereira - Jicaral
- Enrique Moura – Pérez Zeledón
- Tássio Maia - Saprissa

=== Chile ===
- Horacio Díaz Luco – Herediano, Limón Sprite, Cartaginés, Municipal Turrialba, Municipal Limón
- Ismael Fuentes – Santos de Guápiles
- Alejandro González – Alajuelense
- Carlos González – Saprissa
- Eduardo Quintanilla – San Carlos
- Rubén Rodríguez-Peña – Herediano
- Adrián Rojas – Cartaginés
- Nino Rojas – Alajuelense
- Carlos Soza - Limón
- Francisco Ugarte - Limón

=== Colombia ===
- Elier Aponzá – Pérez Zeledón
- César Arias – Belen
- Carlos Asprilla – Herediano
- Jose Balanta- Municipal Liberia
- Ronald Benavides - Limón
- Sebastián Bermúdez - UCR
- Oscar Briceño – Herediano
- Fernando Cárdenas - UCR
- Sebastian Gonzales – Belén FC, Guadalupe
- Wilmer Cabrera – Herediano
- Jhon Culma – Brujas
- Jhon Ibargüen - UCR
- Neco Martínez – Guanacasteca
- Junior Murillo - Limón
- Daniel Ocampo - UCR
- Carlos Palacios - Limón
- Nixon Perea – Alajuelense
- Roberto Polo – Brujas
- Sergio Reina – Cartaginés
- Andres Riascos - UCR
- Omar Royero – Pérez Zeledón, Liberia Mía, Santos de Guápiles, Carmelita, UCR
- Ricardo Steer – Pérez Zeledón, Brujas
- Carlos Salazar – Alajuelense
- Luis Martínez - Guanacasteca

=== Ecuador ===
- Jefferson Hurtado – Alajuelense

=== Paraguay ===
- Lauro Cazal - Pérez Zeledón
- Óscar Nadin Díaz González – Herediano
- Luis Rodríguez - UCR

=== Perú (Peru) ===
- Alfonso Yañez – Saprissa – 2000
- Mario Parreaguirre – Herediano – 1947
- Braulio Valverde – La Libertad – 1929
- Sigifredo Vargas – San Ramón – 1968–1970
- José Chicona – San Ramón – 1977-1978
- Reynaldo Jaime – Cartaginés – 1979-1980
- Manuel Lobatón – Saprissa – 1979
- Carlos Izquierdo Sánchez – Turrialba, Cartaginés, San Ramón – 1979, 1980, 1981
- Augusto Palacios – Cartaginés – 1979-1980
- Alberto Castillo – Herediano – 1993–1994
- Aguinaldo Otta – Pérez Zeledón — 1997-1998
- Karl Wiliams – Saprissa
- Pascual Ramirez – Cartaginés (Reserve) — 1980
- Carlos Salazar – Cartaginés (Reserve)
- Mauricio Zumaeta – Cartaginés (Reserve)

=== Uruguay ===
- Leonardo Abelenda – A.D. San Carlos
- Carim Adippe – Cartaginés
- Edgardo Baldi – Alajuelense
- Rafael Bianchi – Herediano
- Sergio Blanco - Ramonense
- José Cancela – Herediano, Saprissa, Belén, Liberia Mía, Pérez Zeledón
- James Cantero – Club Sport Uruguay de Coronado
- Paolo Cardozo – Cartaginés
- Claudio Ciccia – Alajuelense, Cartaginés, Puntarenas F.C.
- Sebastián Diana – Saprissa
- Gustavo Ferreyra – Saprissa
- Sebastián Fuentes – Puntarenas F.C.
- Carlos Macchi – Alajuelense
- Miguel Mansilla – Saprissa, Puntarenas F.C.
- Edgar Martínez – Santos de Guápiles
- Julio Modernell – Puntarenas F.C.
- Juan Manuel Morales – Saprissa
- Néstor Fabián Morais – Pérez Zeledón
- Mario Orta – Herediano, Saprissa
- César Pellegrín – Herediano
- Álvaro Enrique Peña – Puntarenas F.C.
- Miguel Ángel Pereira (Oso) - Saprissa
- Gerardo Priori - Turrialba
- Fabrizio Ronchetti - A.D. San Carlos, Santos de Guápiles
- Joaquin Santellan - Jicaral
- Jonathan Soto - A.D. San Carlos
- Pablo Tiscornia – Herediano, Cartaginés, Puntarenas F.C.
- Nicolás Vigneri – Cartaginés

=== Venezuela ===
- Roberto Brito Jr. – Puntarenas F.C.
- Víctor Pérez - Grecia

== North and Central America, Caribbean (CONCACAF) ==
=== Bahamas (The Bahamas) ===
- Kamal Degregory – Belén

=== Belize ===
- Deon McCaulay – Puntarenas F.C.
- Shane Orio – Puntarenas F.C., Ramonense

=== Canada ===
- Manjrekar James - Alajuelense, Santos de Guápiles

=== Cuba ===
- Frank Mejías – Club Sport La Libertad
- Marcel Hernández Campanioni - Cartaginés

=== El Salvador ===
- Lester Blanco – San Carlos, Jicaral
- Norberto Huezo – Herediano
- Alexander Larin – Herediano
- Carlos Antonio Meléndez – Asociación Deportiva San Miguel
- Conrado Miranda – Uruguay, Club Sport La Libertad
- Nildeson – Herediano
- Eliseo Quintanilla – Alajuelense
- Luis Ramírez Zapata – Cartaginés
- José Sigifredo Espinoza (Bucky) – Alajuelense

=== Guatemala ===
- Sixto Betancourt – Cartaginés
- Moises Hernandez – Saprissa
- Rafael Morales – Saprissa
- Ángelo Padilla – Puntarenas F.C., Carmelita, Municipal Liberia
- Ignacio González (Nacho) – Saprissa

=== Haiti ===
- Roody Lormera – Puntarenas F.C.
- Nael Elysee - Grecia

=== Honduras ===
- Ciro Paulino Castillo- Alajuelense, Cartaginés
- Rubilio Castillo - Saprissa
- Arnold Cruz – Cartaginés
- Juan Carlos Espinoza – Alajuelense
- Danilo Galindo – Herediano
- Henry Figueroa - Alajuelense
- José Roberto Figueroa – Cartaginés
- Eugenio Dolmo Flores – Alajuelense
- Luis Garrido – Alajuelense
- Nahamán González – Alajuelense, Herediano
- Amado Guevara – Saprissa
- José Güity – Herediano
- Alexander López - Alajuelense
- Emil Martínez – Alajuelense
- Saúl Martínez – Herediano
- Ninrrol Medina – Saprissa
- Ramón Núñez – Alajuelense
- César Obando – Cartaginés
- Jerry Palacios – Alajuelense
- Roger Rojas – Alajuelense
- Nicolás Suazo – Herediano
- Christian Santamaría – Cartaginés
- Ángel Tejeda – Pérez Zeledón, Alajuelense

=== Jamaica ===
- Javon East - San Carlos
- Maalique Foster - Alajuelense
- Craig Foster - Pérez Zeledón

=== Mexico ===
- Alejandro Abasolo – Belén, Guadalupe
- Manuel Arce - Guadalupe
- Omar Arellano – Herediano
- Julio César Cruz – Belén, Herediano, San Carlos
- Juan Felipe Delgadillo - Cartaginés
- Alberto García Jr. – Belén
- Julio Cruz González - Cartaginés
- Sebastián Fassi – Belén
- Francisco Fonseca – Santos de Guápiles
- Diego Franco – Belén
- Juan de Dios Hernández – Alajuelense
- Luis Omar Hernandez – Herediano
- Luis Ángel Landín – Herediano
- Édgar Gerardo Lugo - Herediano
- Aldo Magaña - Herediano, Grecia
- Luis Ernesto Michel – Saprissa
- Alfonso Nieto – Herediano
- Julio César Pardini – Herediano
- César de la Peña – Belén
- Moctezuma Serrato – Herediano

=== Nicaragua ===
- Byron Bonilla - Cartaginés, Grecia
- Luis Fernando Copete – AS Puma Generaleña
- Francisco Flores - Santos de Guápiles
- Jason Ingram - Santos de Guápiles
- Raúl Leguías – AS Puma Generaleña
- Marlon López – Santos de Guápiles
- Justo Lorente – Municipal Liberia
- Danny Téllez – Guanacasteca
- Hamilton West – Guanacasteca

=== Panama ===
- Jorman Israel Aguilar - San Carlos
- Empanada Arosemena - Libertad
- Abdiel Arroyo – Alajuelense
- Nelson Barahona - Cartaginés
- Ricardo Buitrago – Cartaginés
- Roberto Brown – Cartaginés
- Diógenes Cáceres – Herediano
- Ronaldo Dinolis - Santos de Guápiles
- Richard Dixon - Limón
- Luis Gallardo – Herediano
- Freddy Góndola – Alajuelense
- Victor Griffith - Santos de Guápiles
- Armando Gun – Alajuelense
- Brunet Hay – Pérez Zeledón, Herediano, Belén
- Amílcar Henríquez – Santacruceña
- Adolfo Machado – Saprissa, Alajuelense
- Óscar McFarlane – Pérez Zeledón
- Víctor René Mendieta Jr. – Santacruceña
- Víctor Miranda – UCR
- Jaime Penedo – Saprissa
- Pércival Piggott – Liberia
- Armando Polo – Pérez Zeledón
- Álex Rodríguez – Pérez Zeledón
- Roberto Tyrrel – Alajuelense
- Alejandro Vélez – Guanacasteca
- Amir Waithe - Carmelita
- Humberto Ward - Limón

=== Saint Lucia ===
- Kurt Frederick – Alajuelense

=== Trinidad and Tobago ===
- Michael Maurice – Herediano
- Aubrey David – Saprissa

=== United States ===
- Javier Clavijo - Limón
- Roy Lassiter – Alajuelense, Carmelita
- David Quesada – Alajuelense, Ramonense, Saprissa
- Kurt Kelley - Saprissa, Belén, Goicoechea and Carmelita

== Oceania (ONC) ==
=== New Zealand ===
- Maksim Manko – Santos de Gualipes

== Europe (UEFA) ==
=== Czech Republic ===
- Pavel Karoch – Alajuelense
- Ladislav Jakubec – Alajuelense
- Tomáš Poštulka – Carmelita

=== Denmark ===
- Jacob Sloth Bennedsen – Cartaginés

=== England ===
- Antonio Pedroza - Herediano

=== Switzerland ===
- Thomas Alder – Carmelita

=== France ===
- Román Calvo - UCR
- Michel Gafour – Liberia Mía
- Jacques Rémy – Liberia Mía
- Bruno Savry – Liberia Mía

=== Italy ===
- José Cróceri - Cartaginés

=== Serbia ===
- Boris Balinović – Limón, Liberia
- Miroslav Bjeloš – Limón
- Vladimir Vujasinović – Limón, Liberia
- Zoran Zec – Limón

=== Spain ===
- Aram Pazos – Municipal Liberia
- Lázaro Candal – Club Sport La Libertad
- Francisco Javier De Lucas – Ramonense, San Carlos
- Nicolás Nogales – Turrialba, Sagrada Familia

=== Slovakia ===
- Josef Miso – Herediano, Alajuelense
