= Tigo Sports =

Latin American pay television network

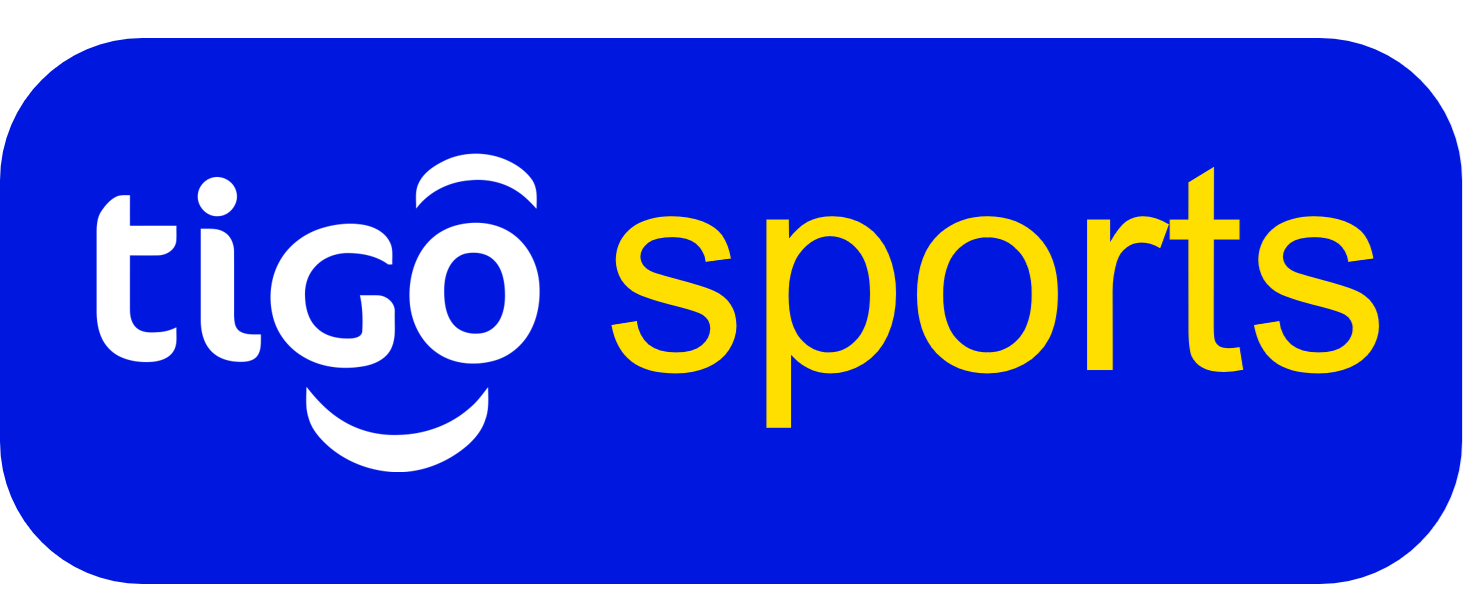
- Type: Sports
- Country: Paraguay; Bolivia
- Broadcast area: Paraguay; Bolivia; Formerly: El Salvador; Guatemala; Costa Rica; Honduras; Panama

Programming
- Language: Spanish
- Picture format: 1080i HDTV (downscaled to 16:9 480i/576i for the SDTV feed)

Ownership
- Owner: Millicom

History
- Launched: 1 February 2014
- Replaced by: Fox (exc. Bolivia and Paraguay)

Links
- Website: www.tigosports.com.py www.tigosports.com.bo www.tigosports.com.hn www.tigosports.gt www.tigosports.cr www.tigosports.com.sv www.tigosports.com.pa

Tigo Sports is a Latin American pay television network operated by the telecommunications company Tigo, dedicated exclusively to sports. The brand was launched in February 2014 by Tigo Paraguay, and was later extended to other Latin American countries.

In April 2026, Fox Corporation purchased the Tigo Sports operations in Guatemala, Honduras, El Salvador, Nicaragua, Costa Rica and Panama. The following month, the assets started being rebranded into Fox and Fox+ Channels, ahead of the 2026 FIFA World Cup. Tigo Sports continues operating in Paraguay and Bolivia.

== By country ==
=== Paraguay ===
The channel was launched on February 1, 2014, with the broadcast of Paraguayan football, basketball and rugby matches, which were broadcast exclusively by Unicanal and by the Tigo Star Paraguay events channel.

On April 30, 2015, Tigo Sports used the black ribbon in mourning, due to the death of sports journalist Gustavo Köhn, who died at the Camargo Cancer Center in São Paulo, Brazil, due to colon cancer that he suffered in the last years.

In February 2016, the Tigo Sports channels began to broadcast all their programming in a 16:9 aspect ratio.

On June 6, 2018, representatives of Tigo Star Paraguay announced the launch of Tigo Sports+, a parallel backup signal for the main channel.

On February 1, 2019, it was revealed that Tigo Sports acquired the rights to the 2019 Copa Sudamericana. And on June 14, 2020, it was revealed they acquired the rights to the Spanish La Liga for the 2019/2020 season, up to 5 exclusive matches on the Tigo Sports and Tigo Sports + signal.

In mid-2022 Tigo Sports 3 was released.

The 3 channels broadcast Paraguayan football matches on Saturdays and Mondays, volleyball on Wednesdays, basketball on Thursdays, and futsal on Fridays.

=== Bolivia ===
Tigo Sports began its broadcasts in Bolivia on November 27, 2014, with the La Paz derby that was played at the Hernando Siles Stadium, between The Strongest and Bolívar, which was the event chosen for the launch of the first Bolivian channel specialized in sports. Minutes before the start of the match, company executives officially announced the beginning of the programming of Tigo Sports, a channel that broadcasts its signal through the cable operator Tigo Star, visible on channel 800 of the standard service, 900 in HD and on 8 in satellite service.

== See also ==
- Claro Sports
- ESPN (Latin America)
- TyC Sports Internacional
- Fox Sports (Latin America)
- GolTV (Latin America)
- DSports
- Telefuturo
- Trece
- Noticias PY
- Paraguay TV
- Unicanal
- FUTV
- TD+
- Televicentro
- COS
- RPC TV
- TVMax
