= 2007–08 Watford F.C. season =

English football team season

Watford
2007–08 season
- Chairman: Graham Simpson
- Manager: Aidy Boothroyd
- Stadium: Vicarage Road
- Football League Championship: 6th
- Football League Championship play-offs: Semi final (eliminated by Hull City)
- FA Cup: Fourth round (eliminated by Wolverhampton Wanderers)
- League Cup: Second round (eliminated by Southend United)
- Highest home attendance: 18,698: Watford v Queens Park Rangers, 29 December 2007
- Lowest home attendance: 8,166: Watford v Gillingham, 14 August 2007
| Home colours | Away colours |

The 2007–08 football season was Watford Football Club's 62nd consecutive season of competitive football since the Second World War. It began on 1 July 2007, and concluded on 30 June 2008, although competitive games were only played between August and May.

== Season summary ==
Following relegation from the Premier League in 2006–07, Watford started the 2007–08 season strongly, winning eleven of their opening sixteen games and opening up an 8-point gap at the top of the Championship table. However, after the departure of Adam Johnson to Middlesbrough on 11 November 2007 Watford's form declined; they won six of their next sixteen Championship games, and only one of their final sixteen. In January 2008 Watford sold captain Gavin Mahon and top scorer Marlon King, but purchased Mat Sadler, Leigh Bromby and John Eustace. Watford finished the 2007–08 season in 6th position, and were eliminated in the play-off semi finals to Hull City.

== Matches ==
Legend

Win Draw Loss

=== Championship ===
Championship match details
| Date | Opponent | Venue | Result F–A | Scorers | Attendance | Ref. |
|---|---|---|---|---|---|---|
| 11 August 2007 | Wolverhampton Wanderers | Away | 2–1 | Stewart 87', King 90' pen. | 23,115 | |
| 18 August 2007 | Sheffield United | Home | 1–0 | Williamson 56' | 16,414 | |
| 25 August 2007 | Leicester City | Away | 1–4 | King 90' pen. | 21,642 | |
| 1 September 2007 | Ipswich Town | Home | 2–0 | Henderson 6', Smith 75' | 17,295 | |
| 16 September 2007 | Southampton | Home | 3–2 | Shittu 42', Henderson 81', 90' | 15,915 | |
| 19 September 2007 | Cardiff City | Away | 2–1 | Henderson 17', 78' | 13,169 | |
| 22 September 2007 | Queens Park Rangers | Away | 1–1 | Johnson 49' | 14,240 | |
| 29 September 2007 | Blackpool | Home | 1–1 | Johnson 41' | 16,580 | |
| 2 October 2007 | Sheffield Wednesday | Home | 2–1 | Henderson 6', King 16' pen. | 15,743 | |
| 6 October 2007 | Scunthorpe United | Away | 3–1 | Johnson 10', Henderson 61', King 63' | 7,515 | |
| 20 October 2007 | Hull City | Home | 1–0 | King 20' | 15,803 | |
| 23 October 2007 | Coventry City | Away | 3–0 | Johnson 30', King 42', Henderson 46' | 17,032 | |
| 29 October 2007 | Crystal Palace | Away | 2–0 | Smith 32', King 67' | 13,986 | |
| 3 November 2007 | West Bromwich Albion | Home | 0–3 | | 18,273 | |
| 6 November 2007 | Norwich City | Away | 3–1 | Henderson 36', Marshall 43' o.g., King 88' | 24,192 | |
| 10 November 2007 | Colchester United | Home | 2–2 | Johnson 4', King 64' | 16,069 | |
| 24 November 2007 | Barnsley | Away | 2–3 | Shittu 36', 45' | 10,117 | |
| 27 November 2007 | Burnley | Home | 1–2 | Shittu 86' | 15,021 | |
| 1 December 2007 | Bristol City | Home | 1–2 | O'Toole 87' | 16,689 | |
| 4 December 2007 | Colchester United | Away | 3–2 | King 40', O'Toole 42', Priskin 64' | 5,760 | |
| 9 December 2007 | Stoke City | Away | 0–0 | | 15,516 | |
| 15 December 2007 | Plymouth Argyle | Home | 0–1 | | 18,532 | |
| 22 December 2007 | Sheffield Wednesday | Away | 1–0 | McAnuff 6' | 19,641 | |
| 26 December 2007 | Cardiff City | Home | 2–2 | DeMerit 49', McAnuff 90' | 17,014 | |
| 29 December 2007 | Queens Park Rangers | Home | 2–4 | Francis 52', Shittu 84' | 18,698 | |
| 1 January 2008 | Southampton | Away | 3–0 | Francis 45', King 55', Henderson 62' | 23,008 | |
| 12 January 2008 | Preston North End | Away | 0–1 | | 12,347 | |
| 19 January 2008 | Charlton Athletic | Home | 1–1 | Ellington 59' | 17,214 | |
| 29 January 2008 | Sheffield United | Away | 1–1 | Ellington 21' | 23,161 | |
| 2 February 2008 | Wolverhampton Wanderers | Home | 3–0 | Kabba 1', Smith 76', 78' | 18,082 | |
| 9 February 2008 | Ipswich Town | Away | 2–1 | Smith 33', Ellington 56' | 24,227 | |
| 12 February 2008 | Leicester City | Home | 1–0 | Henderson 45' | 15,944 | |
| 16 February 2008 | Charlton Athletic | Away | 2–2 | O'Toole 54', Shittu 55' | 26,337 | |
| 23 February 2008 | Preston North End | Home | 0–0 | | 16,798 | |
| 1 March 2008 | Burnley | Away | 2–2 | Henderson 23', Stewart 85' | 13,677 | |
| 4 March 2008 | Norwich City | Home | 1–1 | Shittu 11' | 16,537 | |
| 11 March 2008 | Bristol City | Away | 0–0 | | 19,026 | |
| 15 March 2008 | Stoke City | Home | 0–0 | | 18,338 | |
| 22 March 2008 | Plymouth Argyle | Away | 1–1 | Williamson 37' | 17,511 | |
| 29 March 2008 | Hull City | Away | 0–3 | | 23,501 | |
| 5 April 2008 | Coventry City | Home | 2–1 | Ellington 7', Smith 79' | 17,188 | |
| 9 April 2008 | Barnsley | Home | 0–3 | | 16,129 | |
| 12 April 2008 | West Bromwich Albion | Away | 1–1 | Bromby 6' | 26,508 | |
| 19 April 2008 | Crystal Palace | Home | 0–2 | | 17,694 | |
| 26 April 2008 | Scunthorpe United | Home | 0–1 | | 16,454 | |
| 4 May 2008 | Blackpool | Away | 1–1 | Smith 62' | 9,640 | |

==== League standings by round ====
Automatic promotion position Playoff position

| Game | 1 | 2 | 3 | 4 | 5 | 6 | 7 | 8 | 9 | 10 | 11 | 12 | 13 | 14 | 15 | 16 | 17 | 18 | 19 | 20 | 21 | 22 | 23 | 24 | 25 | 26 | 27 | 28 | 29 | 30 | 31 | 32 | 33 | 34 | 35 | 36 | 37 | 38 | 39 | 40 | 41 | 42 | 43 | 44 | 45 | 46 |
|---|---|---|---|---|---|---|---|---|---|---|---|---|---|---|---|---|---|---|---|---|---|---|---|---|---|---|---|---|---|---|---|---|---|---|---|---|---|---|---|---|---|---|---|---|---|---|
| Ground | A | H | A | H | H | A | A | H | H | A | H | A | A | H | A | H | A | H | H | A | A | H | A | H | H | A | A | H | A | H | A | H | A | H | A | H | A | H | A | A | H | H | A | H | H | A |
| Result | W | W | L | W | W | W | D | D | W | W | W | W | W | L | W | D | L | L | L | W | D | L | W | D | L | W | L | D | D | W | W | W | D | D | D | D | D | D | D | L | W | L | D | L | L | D |
| Points | 3 | 6 | 6 | 9 | 12 | 15 | 16 | 17 | 20 | 23 | 26 | 29 | 32 | 32 | 35 | 36 | 36 | 36 | 36 | 39 | 40 | 40 | 43 | 44 | 44 | 47 | 47 | 48 | 49 | 52 | 55 | 58 | 59 | 60 | 61 | 62 | 63 | 64 | 65 | 65 | 68 | 68 | 69 | 69 | 69 | 70 |
| Position | 5 | 1 | 4 | 2 | 1 | 1 | 1 | 1 | 1 | 1 | 1 | 1 | 1 | 1 | 1 | 1 | 1 | 1 | 1 | 1 | 1 | 2 | 1 | 2 | 2 | 2 | 3 | 2 | 3 | 2 | 1 | 1 | 2 | 3 | 3 | 2 | 3 | 3 | 4 | 5 | 4 | 5 | 5 | 5 | 5 | 6 |

==== Play-offs ====
Watford's sixth-placed finish meant that they qualified for the play-off semi finals, where they would play a home and away match against third-placed Hull City. As 6–1 aggregate winners, Hull qualified for the final at Wembley Stadium, and as a result of victory in that match they earned qualification to the Premier League for the 2008–09 season.

| Round | Date | Opponent | Venue | Result F–A | Scorers | Attendance | Ref. |
|---|---|---|---|---|---|---|---|
| Semi-final, first leg | 11 May 2008 | Hull City | Home | 0–2 | | 14,713 | |
| Semi-final, second leg | 15 May 2008 | Hull City | Away | 1–4 | Henderson 12' | 23,155 | |

=== FA Cup ===
As a Championship club, Watford did not enter the FA Cup until the third round stage. Their potential opponents were the 20 Premier League teams, the 23 other Championship clubs, and 20 teams from lower divisions which had progressed through the first and second rounds, and in some cases additional qualifying games.

| Round | Date | Opponent | Venue | Result F–A | Scorers | Attendance | Ref. |
|---|---|---|---|---|---|---|---|
| Third round | 5 January 2008 | Crystal Palace | Home | 2–0 | Shittu 28', 65' | 10,480 | |
| Fourth round | 26 January 2008 | Wolverhampton Wanderers | Home | 1–4 | O'Toole 70' | 12,719 | |

=== League Cup ===
For the 2007–08 season, all Football League clubs entered the League Cup in the first round. For the first round, the draw was split into two regional sections of 36 teams. The 18 highest placed teams in the league from the previous season were seeded in each region. Watford, having been relegated from the Premier League, were therefore seeded, and placed in the southern section of the draw.

| Round | Date | Opponent | Venue | Result F–A | Scorers | Attendance | Ref. |
|---|---|---|---|---|---|---|---|
| First round | 14 August 2007 | Gillingham | Home | 3–0 | Priskin 22', Rinaldi 36', Campana 71' | 8,166 | |
| Second round | 28 August 2007 | Southend United | Away | 0–2 | | 5,554 | |

== Ownership and finance ==
Watford Football Club is owned by the holding company Watford Leisure Plc (LSE: WFC). Its 2007–08 financial year coincided with the football season, running from 1 July 2007 until 30 June 2008. The company's annual accounts were released in November 2008, showing an operating loss of £10.977 million, but a net profit of £426,000 as a result of the sale of player registrations and land. Watford Leisure's chief executive was Mark Ashton, while their chairman was self-professed lifelong Watford fan Graham Simpson, who also owned shares in the company. The club's other major shareholders were Deputy Chairman of the Conservative Party Michael Ashcroft through his investment company Fordwat, and brothers Jimmy and Vince Russo through their business Valley Grown Salads.

== Squad details ==
=== Player statistics ===
Key

† Permanent player left club during the season.
‡ On loan at Watford from another club during season.
¤ On loan to another club from Watford during season.
* First appearance(s) for Watford.

# = Squad number; Pos = Playing position; P = Number of games played; G = Number of goals scored; = Yellow cards; = Red cards; GK = Goalkeeper; DF = Defender; MF = Midfielder; FW = Forward

Statistics do not include games played for other clubs. Starting appearances are given first, followed by substitute appearances in parentheses where applicable. (Note: All players who were named in a Watford first-team matchday squad are listed. This includes players who only featured as unused substitutes.)

This table of statistics is incomplete. You can help by expanding it.

| Pos | Name | P | G | P | G | P | G | P | G | P | G | A yellow card | A red card |
| Pos | Name | League | | FA Cup | | League Cup | | Playoffs | | Total | | Discipline | |
|---|---|---|---|---|---|---|---|---|---|---|---|---|---|
| MF | Lionel Ainsworth | 3(5) | 0 | 0 | 0 | 0 | 0 | 1(1) | 0 | 4(6) | 0 | 0 | 0 |
| DF | Cédric Avinel | 0 | 0 | 0 | 0 | 2 | 0 | 0 | 0 | 2 | 0 | 1 | 0 |
| MF | Al Bangura | 3(4) | 0 | 1 | 0 | 2 | 0 | 0 | 0 | 6(4) | 0 | 2 | 0 |
| DF | Leigh Bromby | 16 | 1 | 0 | 0 | 0 | 0 | 2 | 0 | 18 | 0 | 0 | 0 |
| MF | Alex Campana | 0 | 0 | 0 | 0 | 1(1) | 1 | 0 | 0 | 1(1) | 1 | 0 | 0 |
| MF | Ewan Clarke | 0 | 0 | 0 | 0 | 0 | 0 | 0 | 0 | 0 | 0 | 0 | 0 |
| DF | Calum Davenport | 1 | 0 | 0 | 0 | 0 | 0 | 0 | 0 | 1 | 0 | 0 | 0 |
| DF | Jay DeMerit | 30(5) | 1 | 2 | 0 | 0 | 0 | 1(1) | 0 | 31(6) | 1 | 2 | 0 |
| DF | Lloyd Doyley | 36 | 0 | 2 | 0 | 0 | 0 | 1 | 0 | 39 | 0 | 4 | 0 |
| FW | Nathan Ellington | 18(16) | 4 | 1(1) | 0 | 0 | 0 | 2 | 0 | 21(17) | 4 | 1 | 0 |
| MF | John Eustace | 13 | 0 | 0 | 0 | 0 | 0 | 2 | 0 | 15 | 0 | 3 | 2 |
| MF | Kieran Forbes | 0 | 0 | 0 | 0 | 0(1) | 0 | 0 | 0 | 0(1) | 0 | 0 | 0 |
| MF | Damien Francis | 6(5) | 2 | 1 | 0 | 0 | 0 | 0 | 0 | 7(5) | 2 | 1 | 0 |
| FW | Liam Henderson | 0 | 0 | 0 | 0 | 0 | 0 | 0 | 0 | 0 | 0 | 0 | 0 |
| FW | Darius Henderson | 34(6) | 12 | 1 | 0 | 0 | 0 | 1 | 1 | 36(6) | 12 | 10 | 1 |
| FW | Will Hoskins | 0(1) | 0 | 0 | 0 | 2 | 0 | 0 | 0 | 2(1) | 0 | 0 | 0 |
| DF | Matt Jackson | 6 | 0 | 0 | 0 | 2 | 0 | 0 | 0 | 8 | 0 | 2 | 0 |
| FW | Collins John | 3(2) | 0 | 0 | 0 | 0 | 0 | 0 | 0 | 3(2) | 0 | 0 | 0 |
| MF | Adam Johnson | 11(1) | 5 | 0 | 0 | 0 | 0 | 0 | 0 | 11(1) | 5 | 1 | 0 |
| FW | Steve Kabba | 7(7) | 1 | 1 | 0 | 1 | 0 | 0 | 0 | 9(7) | 1 | 2 | 1 |
| FW | Marlon King | 25(2) | 11 | 1 | 0 | 0 | 0 | 0 | 0 | 26(2) | 11 | 2 | 0 |
| GK | Richard Lee | 34(1) | 0 | 2 | 0 | 2 | 0 | 2 | 0 | 40(1) | 0 | 0 | 0 |
| GK | Scott Loach | 0 | 0 | 0 | 0 | 0 | 0 | 0 | 0 | 0 | 0 | 0 | 0 |
| DF | Malky Mackay | 0 | 0 | 0 | 0 | 0(1) | 0 | 0 | 0 | 0(1) | 0 | 0 | 0 |
| MF | Gavin Mahon | 19 | 0 | 0 | 0 | 0 | 0 | 0 | 0 | 19 | 0 | 3 | 0 |
| DF | Adrian Mariappa | 13(12) | 0 | 0(2) | 0 | 2 | 0 | 1 | 0 | 16(14) | 0 | 1 | 0 |
| MF | Jobi McAnuff | 31(8) | 2 | 2 | 0 | 0 | 0 | 2 | 0 | 35(8) | 2 | 5 | 0 |
| MF | Anthony McNamee | 0 | 0 | 0 | 0 | 2 | 0 | 0 | 0 | 2 | 0 | 0 | 0 |
| MF | John-Joe O'Toole | 23(12) | 3 | 1 | 1 | 0(1) | 0 | 0(1) | 0 | 24(14) | 3 | 4 | 1 |
| DF | Junior Osbourne | 0 | 0 | 0 | 0 | 0(1) | 0 | 0 | 0 | 0(1) | 0 | 0 | 0 |
| DF | Jordan Parkes | 0 | 0 | 0 | 0 | 2 | 0 | 0 | 0 | 2 | 0 | 0 | 0 |
| GK | Mart Poom | 12 | 0 | 0 | 0 | 0 | 0 | 0 | 0 | 12 | 0 | 0 | 0 |
| FW | Tamás Priskin | 7(7) | 1 | 1(1) | 0 | 2 | 1 | 0(2) | 0 | 10(10) | 2 | 2 | 0 |
| DF | Douglas Rinaldi | 0 | 0 | 0 | 0 | 2 | 1 | 0 | 0 | 2 | 1 | 2 | 0 |
| DF | Mat Sadler | 14(1) | 0 | 1 | 0 | 0 | 0 | 2 | 0 | 16(1) | 0 | 2 | 0 |
| DF | Danny Shittu | 37(2) | 7 | 1 | 2 | 0 | 0 | 1 | 0 | 39(2) | 9 | 4 | 0 |
| MF | Tommy Smith | 44 | 7 | 1(1) | 0 | 0 | 0 | 2 | 0 | 47(1) | 7 | 3 | 0 |
| MF | Jordan Stewart | 33(6) | 2 | 1 | 0 | 0 | 0 | 0 | 0 | 34(6) | 2 | 3 | 0 |
| FW | Lee Williamson | 27(5) | 2 | 1 | 0 | 0 | 0 | 2 | 0 | 30(5) | 2 | 5 | 1 |

== Transfers ==
=== In ===
| Date | Player | From | Fee | Ref. |
|---|---|---|---|---|
| 22 May 2007 | Douglas Rinaldi | Veranópolis | £250,000 | |
| 24 May 2007 | Matt Jackson | Wigan Athletic | Free | |
| 26 May 2007 | Mart Poom | Arsenal | Undisclosed | |
| 5 June 2007 | Jobi McAnuff | Crystal Palace | £1,750,000 | |
| 29 August 2007 | Nathan Ellington | West Bromwich Albion | £3,250,000 | |
| 22 October 2007 | Ian Joyce | | Free | |
| 5 January 2008 | Lionel Ainsworth | Hereford United | Undisclosed | |
| 24 January 2008 | Mat Sadler | Birmingham City | £750,000 | |
| 31 January 2008 | Leigh Bromby | Sheffield United | £600,000 | |
| 31 January 2008 | John Eustace | Stoke City | £250,000 | |

=== Out ===
| Date | Player | To | Fee | Ref. |
|---|---|---|---|---|
| 30 June 2007 | Chris Powell | Charlton Athletic | Released | |
| 30 June 2007 | Dominic Blizzard | Milton Keynes Dons | Released | |
| 30 June 2007 | Albert Jarrett | | Released | |
| 30 June 2007 | Joel Grant | Aldershot Town | Released | |
| 11 July 2007 | Harry Forrester | Aston Villa | | |
| 7 August 2007 | Hamer Bouazza | Fulham | £3,000,000 (can rise up to £4,000,000) | |
| 16 August 2007 | Clarke Carlisle | Burnley | £200,000 | |
| 20 August 2007 | Johan Cavalli | | Mutual consent | |
| 18 January 2008 | Anthony McNamee | Swindon Town | | |
| 25 January 2008 | Marlon King | Wigan Athletic | Undisclosed | |

=== Loans in ===
| Start date | Player | From | End date | Ref. |
|---|---|---|---|---|
| 31 August 2007 | Santiago Aloi | River Plate | End of season | |
| 14 September 2007 | Adam Johnson | Middlesbrough | 16 November 2007 | |
| 22 November 2007 | Lionel Ainsworth | Hereford United | 5 January 2008 | |
| 18 January 2008 | Calum Davenport | West Ham United | | |
| 25 January 2008 | Collins John | Fulham | End of season | |

=== Loans out ===
| Start date | Player | To | End date | Ref. |
|---|---|---|---|---|
| 10 August 2007 | Toumani Diagouraga | Hereford United | 31 December 2007 (later extended) | |
| 10 August 2007 | Theo Robinson | Hereford United | 31 December 2007 (later extended) | |
| 14 September 2007 | Cédric Avinel | Stafford Rangers | October 2007 | |
| 18 September 2007 | Scott Loach | Stafford Rangers | October 2007 | |
| 18 September 2007 | Will Hoskins | Millwall | | |
| 30 November 2007 | Alex Campana | Wealdstone | | |
| 1 January 2008 | Scott Loach | Morecambe | | |
| 1 January 2008 | Gavin Mahon | Queen's Park Rangers | End of season | |
| 17 January 2008 | Jordan Parkes | Brentford | | |
| 18 January 2008 | Moses Ashikodi | Swindon Town | | |
| 18 January 2008 | Anthony McNamee | Swindon Town | | |
| 28 January 2008 | Scott Loach | Bradford City | | |
