= Mbei =

Mbei may refer to:

- Mbeya River, a river of Gabon and Equatorial Guinea
- Mbei, a village in the Santa subdivision in Cameroon
- Manila Bay Enterprises, Inc. (MBEI), see Gambling in Metro Manila
- Mbei Ekwem, a footballer from FC Dunărea Călărași
- Simon Pasteur, full name Mbei Simon Pasteur, Cameroonian professional football midfielder
- Multi-band Earth Imager, as used on satellites such as EgyptSat 1
