= Simon Pasteur =

Cameroonian footballer

Personal information
- Full name: Mbei Simon Pasteur Emmanuel
- Date of birth: 20 February 1988 (age 38)
- Place of birth: Cameroon
- Position: Midfielder

Senior career*
Years	Team	Apps	(Gls)
2004–2005	Union Douala		
2006–?	Impôts FC		
2008–?	Liberia Mia	12	(1)
2011	Bőcs KSC	12	(0)
2011–2012	KBSC	10	(0)
- * Club domestic league appearances and goals as of 3 December 2008

Mbei Simon Pasteur Emmanuel (born 20 February 1988) is a Cameroonian professional football midfielder who currently plays for KBSC in the Ness Hungary NB II.

== Club career ==
Prior to joining Liberia, Pasteur played for Union Douala and Impôts FC in the Cameroon Premiere Division. He scored his first professional goal for Union Douala in a league match against Tonnerre Yaoundé on 30 June 2005. Pasteur participated in the CAF Confederation Cup 2005 with Union Douala, as they lost in the third round to Enugu Rangers.

Pasteur became the first player from Cameroon to appear in the Costa Rican Primera División after Liberia Mia manager Alain Gay-Hardy signed him in 2008.
