= La Tele (Paraguayan TV channel) =

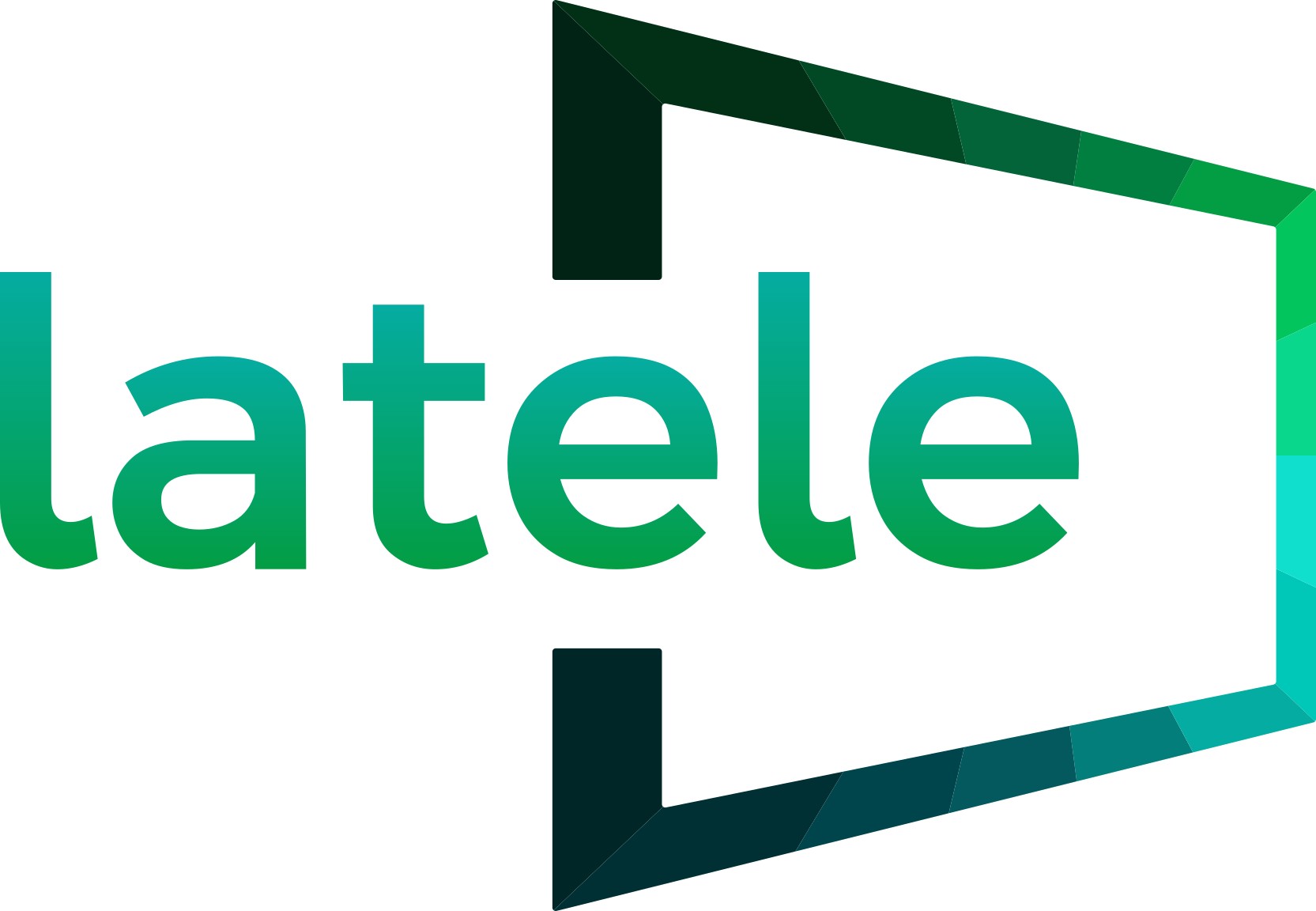
- Country: Paraguay
- Broadcast area: Paraguay
- Headquarters: Asunción, Paraguay

Programming
- Picture format: 1080i HDTV

Ownership
- Owner: A.J. Vierci Group
- Sister channels: Telefuturo; Noticias PY; E40 TV

History
- Launched: 21 September 2008; 17 years ago

Availability

Terrestrial
- Analog VHF: Channel 11 (Asunción and Gran Asunción, until 2025)
- Digital UHF: Channel 28.1 (HD)

La Tele (styled latele) is a Paraguayan over-the-air television channel owned by Grupo Vierci, launched on 21 September 2008, under the license Hispanoamérica TV. The station is a general outlet with original and imported programming (initially absorbing most of what Telefuturo used to air).

== History ==
The company Hispanoamérica TV was registered in Panama on 28 February 2005, put up under the control of Troche Robbiani on March 9. The Paraguayan subsidiary, which was used to exploit its over-the-air signal on VHF channel 11 in Asunción, Hispanoamérica TV del Paraguay SA, was formed in 2007. After conducting test broadcasts during 2008, the station started regular commercial broadcasts on 21 September 2008. The channel opened with an educational offer, containing preschool shows, documentaries, investigative reports and national and international news. At launch time, it had a ten-hour educational programming block (from midnight to 10am) with a substantial amount of documentaries acquired from Discovery Communications and educational courses made locally, paid by for Servicio Nacional de Promoción Profesional.

In 2011, the channel was responsible for airing the acts of Paraguay's Bicentennial, with Telefuturo in charge of the footage outside of Asunción.

On 20 February 2012, it premiered No Somos Ángeles, a celebrity gossip program, based on the Bolivian format of the same name on Red Uno. The format arrived to Paraguay from Bolivian producer Hans Bravo and was previously adapted for Sur Televisora Itapúa before moving to Asunción.

Although the channel since launch was under the editorial control of Grupo A. J. Vierci, the channel in its early years was legally owned by an offshore company, Hispanoamérica TV SA, a Panama-registered offshore created by Mossack Fonseca. Figureheads like Hispanoamérica TV are forbidden in Paraguayan legislation; for which end in 2012 it was suggested that the legal company would be dissolved, which was achieved in April 2013. Hispanoamérica TV never properly operated, as a company, it was rather used to exploit a television license and had no direct relations with Vierci or La Tele.

Latele held the OTA rights of UEFA Euro 2020 (24 matches).
