= NPY =

NPY may refer to:

- Neuropeptide Y, a 36 amino-acid neuropeptide that is involved in various physiological and homeostatic processes in both the central and peripheral nervous systems
- NPY, the IATA airport code for Mpanda Airport, Tanzania
- *.npy files are binary files to store numpy arrays
- Noticias PY, a Paraguayan television news channel
