= UEFA Euro 2000 broadcasting rights =

Football tournament broadcasting rights

The article lists about the broadcasting rights for UEFA Euro 2000.

== Broadcasters ==
=== UEFA ===
Territory	Rights holder	Ref
Albania	RTSH	
Austria	ORF	
Belarus	BTRC	
Belgium	VRT; RTBF	
Bulgaria	BNT	
Croatia	HRT	
Czech Republic	Czech Television	
Denmark	DR; TV 2	
Estonia	ETV	
Finland	Yle	
France	TF1; France Télévisions	
Georgia	GPB	
Germany	ARD; ZDF	
Greece	ERT	
Hungary	MTV	
Iceland	Sjónvarpið	
Israel	IBA	
Italy	RAI	
Latvia	LTV	
Lithuania	LRT	
Macedonia	MKRTV	
Moldova	TRM	
Netherlands	NOS	
Norway	NRK	
Poland	TVP	
Portugal	RTP	
Republic of Ireland	RTÉ	
Romania	TVR	
Russia	ORT; RTR; Kultura	
Slovakia	STV	
Slovenia	RTV Slovenija	
Spain	RTVE; TVE; Eurosport Spain	
Sweden	SVT; TV4	
Switzerland	SRG SSR	
Turkey	TRT	
Ukraine	First National Channel; STB	
United Kingdom	BBC; ITV; British Eurosport	
FR Yugoslavia	RTCG (Montenegro); RTS (Serbia)	

=== Rest of the world ===
Territory	Rights holder	Ref
Argentina	América TV (Some matches); Cable Sport (Highlights)	
Bolivia	TVB	
Brazil	SporTV	
Canada	TSN	
Chile	TVN	
Colombia	RCN Televisión	
People's Republic of China	CCTV	
India	Sony Entertainment Television	
Indonesia	RCTI; SCTV	
Iran	IRIB, IRIZ	
Latin America	ESPN & ESPN 2 (All matches)	
Malaysia	TV3, Astro	
Mexico	Televisa & TV Azteca (Some matches)	
Panama	TVN (Some matches); TV Max (Highlights)	
Paraguay	Red Guaraní (Some matches); Movistar Sports (Highlights)	
Peru	Canal A	
Philippines	ABS-CBN; ESPN Philippines	
Thailand	Channel 3	
Trinidad and Tobago	Sports Max	
United States	Setanta Sports (English); Univision (Some matches on tape delay) (Spanish)	
Uruguay	Red Charrúa (Some matches); Movistar Sports (Highlights)	
Venezuela	Red Global	
Vietnam	VTV, HTV	
