= Última Hora (Paraguay) =

Newspaper published in Paraguay

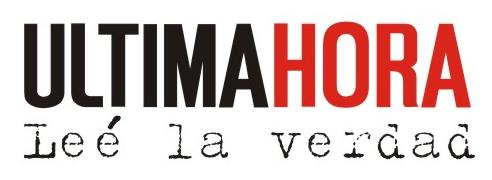
- Type: Daily morning newspaper
- Owner: Editorial El País S.A. (Grupo A.J. Vierci)
- Founded: 8 October 1973
- Language: Spanish
- Headquarters: Asunción, Paraguay
- Country: Paraguay
- Website: www.ultimahora.com

Última Hora is a newspaper published in Paraguay. It was founded in 1973, with Isaac Kostianovsky, known as "Kostia", its founding editor. Founded as an evening newspaper, it launched a morning edition in 1999, and ceased publication of the evening edition in 2002. It launched a Sunday edition in 2004, after 30 years of operating Monday-to-Saturday.

The parent company Editorial El País was taken over by Antonio J. Vierci in March 2003.
