= Mínor Díaz =

Costa Rican footballer and manager (born 1980)

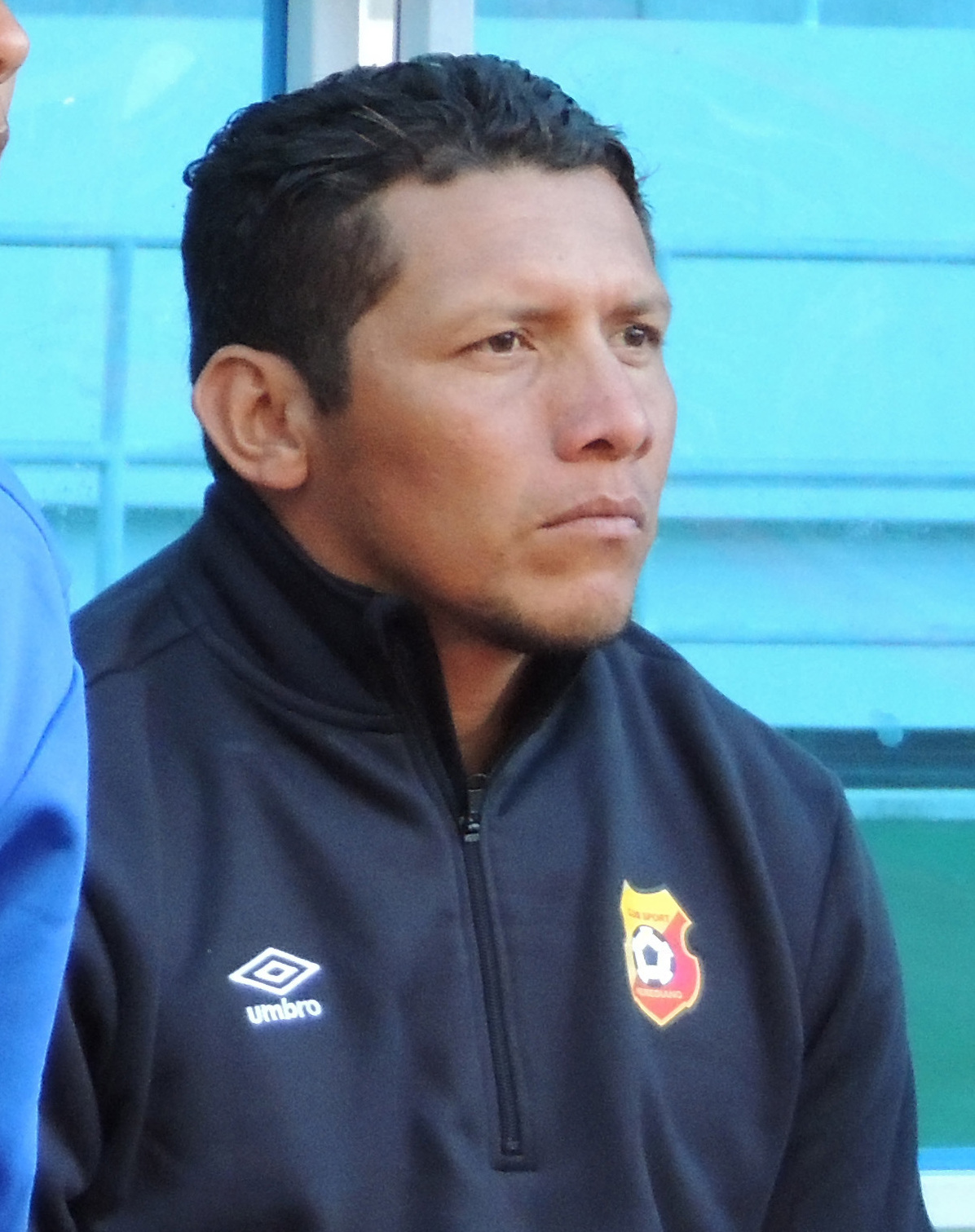

Personal information
- Full name: Mínor Díaz Araya
- Date of birth: 26 December 1980 (age 45)
- Place of birth: Acoyapa de Nicoya, Costa Rica
- Height: 1.75 m (5 ft 9 in)
- Position: Forward

Team information
- Current team: Guanacasteca (ACG) (Manager)

Senior career*
Years	Team	Apps	(Gls)
1998–1999	Santa Bárbara		
1999–2000	Karlsruher SC	6	(0)
2000–2005	Herediano	86	(46)
2005–2006	Alajuelense	32	(11)
2006–2008	Cartaginés	47	(16)
2008–2010	Liberia Mia	48	(6)
2010–2011	UCR	31	(19)
2011	Alajuelense	9	(3)
2012–2014	Herediano	52	(14)
2014	Belén	3	(1)

International career
2001–2005	Costa Rica	6	(1)

Managerial career
- 2014–2018: Herediano (assistant)
- 2016: Herediano (caretaker)
- 2018: Herediano B
- 2018–2019: La U Universitarios
- 2019–: Desamparados
- * Club domestic league appearances and goals

Mínor Díaz Araya (born 26 December 1980 in Acoyapa) is a retired Costa Rican professional footballer and current manager of Fútbol Consultants Desamparados.

== Club career ==
Díaz had a brief spell with Karlsruher SC in the German 2. Fußball-Bundesliga during the 1999–00 season, appearing in six matches. He then had a lengthy spell at Herediano where he became the league's top goalscorer in 2000/01 and played for Alajuelense and Cartaginés. In May 2008 he moved to Liberia Mia, he then sued his club which was renamed Águilas Guanacastecas for owing him 4 months' wages and in summer 2010 joined UCR.

In January 2012 he returned to Herediano, winning two league titles, and in summer 2014 joined Belén.

== International career ==
Díaz played for Costa Rica at the 1997 FIFA U-17 World Cup finals in Egypt and at the 1999 FIFA U-20 World Cup finals in Nigeria.

Díaz has made 6 appearances for the senior Costa Rica national football team, his debut coming in a friendly against Venezuela on April 18, 2001. He appeared in four matches as Costa Rica finished second at the UNCAF Nations Cup 2001 tournament.

== Coaching career ==
Two months after signing with A.D. Belén, Díaz decided to retire after getting offered an assistant manager position at his former club C.S. Herediano. On 16 February 2016, Díaz took charge of Herediano on an interim basis after manager Odir Jacques was fired until Hernán Medford was hired on 21 February. In the summer 2018, he took charge of the club's reserve team, before he was appointed manager of La U Universitarios on 30 October 2018. On 23 September 2019 the club reported through a press release, that Díaz had left the club by mutual agreement.

On 1 October 2019, Díaz was appointed manager of Fútbol Consultants Desamparado.

== Career statistics ==
=== International goals ===
Scores and results list. Costa Rica's goal tally first.

#	Date	Venue	Opponent	Score	Result	Competition
1.	April 18, 2001	Estadio Alejandro Morera Soto, Alajuela, Costa Rica	Venezuela	2–1	2–2	Friendly
