= Yeison Molina =

Costa Rican footballer (born 1996)

Personal information
- Full name: Yeison Molina Ruiz
- Date of birth: 25 January 1996 (age 30)
- Place of birth: Nicoya, Costa Rica
- Height: 1.80 m (5 ft 11 in)
- Position: Centre-back

Team information
- Current team: Municipal Liberia
- Number: 5

Senior career*
Years	Team	Apps	(Gls)
2017–2020	Jicaral		
2020–	Guanacasteca	116	(10)

International career^{‡}
2024–	Costa Rica	1	(0)
- * Club domestic league appearances and goals as of 16 June 2024 ‡ National team caps and goals as of 16 June 2024

Yeison Molina Ruiz (born 25 January 1996) is a Costa Rican professional footballer who plays as a centre-back for Guanacasteca and the Costa Rica national team.

== Club career ==
Born in Nicoya, Molina began his career with Jicaral. After arriving as a forward, he played in several positions for the club during his spell. He also helped Jicaral to achieve promotion to the Liga FPD in 2019.

In July 2020, Molina moved to Guanacasteca in the second division, achieving promotion to the top tier in his first year.

== International career ==
In May 2024, Molina was called up to the Costa Rica national team by manager Gustavo Alfaro for a friendly against Uruguay. He made his full international debut late in the month, starting in the 0–0 draw at the Estadio Nacional in San José.
