= Noticias PY =

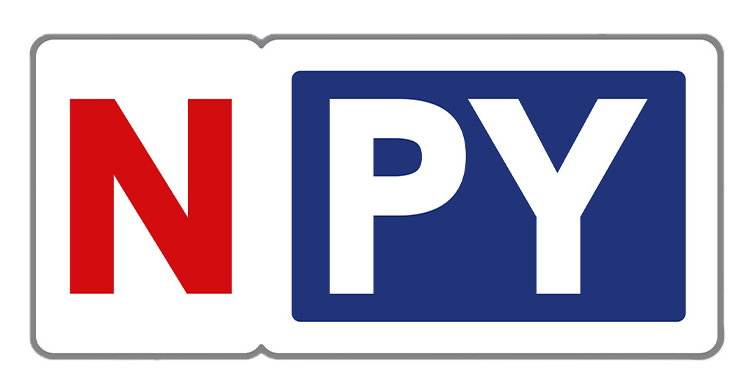
- Country: Paraguay
- Broadcast area: Paraguay
- Headquarters: Asunción, Paraguay

Programming
- Picture format: 1080i HDTV

Ownership
- Owner: A.J. Vierci Group
- Sister channels: Telefuturo; La Tele; E40 TV

History
- Launched: 17 April 2017; 9 years ago

Availability

Terrestrial
- Analog VHF: Channel 2 (Asunción and Gran Asunción, listings may vary)
- Digital UHF: Channel 18.1 (HD)

Noticias PY (read as Noticias Paraguay, abbreviated NPY) is a Paraguayan over-the-air television channel owned by Grupo Vierci, launched on 17 April 2017. It was the first all-news channel in Paraguay, starting as a cable channel, a fact that led to Vierci's competitor SNT setting up C9N over-the-air. It did not gain an OTA network after the group decided to close Red Guaraní, using its frequencies solely for Noticias PY on 1 January 2019.

== History ==
In November 2016, Grupo Vierci reserved channels 15 (SD) and 705 (HD) on Tigo Star for Noticias Paraguay, which was initially scheduled to launch that month.

Noticias Paraguay started broadcasting on 17 April 2017. From the beginning, it employed synergies from its three extant over-the-air television networks, Telefuturo, La Tele and Red Guaraní.

On 1 January 2019, NPY began over-the-air broadcasts by taking over Red Guaraní's over-the-air transmitter network, moving to its slot on cable companies. The former NPY cable-only slot, vacated by the move, was replaced by E40 TV. Vierci used it as a strategy to find ratings, as the Paraguayan unit of IBOPE did not measure cable channels back then. Up until the OTA launch, NPY programs were seen on La Tele in the 6-8 a.m and 1-2 p.m slots, attracting good ratings.

== Technical information ==
As of August 2019, NPY's transmitter network was rented from Red Guaraní's owner José Manzoni and was still broadcasting exclusively on analog television, and not in dual mode like the other networks. It is unknown when NPY started digital broadcasts on channel 18.1; the analog transmitter in Asunción was switched off on the early hours of 1 January 2025.
