= Antonny Monreal =

Mexican footballer (born 1994)

Personal information
- Full name: Antonny Adrián Monreal de la Cruz
- Date of birth: 14 October 1994 (age 32)
- Place of birth: Noria de Ángeles, Zacatecas, Mexico
- Height: 1.87 m (6 ft 1 1/2 in)
- Position: Goalkeeper

Team information
- Current team: Municipal Liberia
- Number: 1

Youth career
- 2011–2014: Pachuca

Senior career*
Years	Team	Apps	(Gls)
2014–2021	Zacatecas	16	(0)
2021–2022	Municipal Grecia	24	(0)
2023–2024	A.D. Guanacasteca	65	(0)
2025–	Municipal Liberia	0	(0)
- * Club domestic league appearances and goals as of 28 November 2024

Antonny Adrián Monreal de la Cruz (born 14 October 1994) is a Mexican professional footballer who plays as a goalkeeper for Liga FPD club A.D. Municipal Liberia.
