= Jesús Henestrosa =

Mexican footballer (born 1994)

Personal information
- Full name: Jesús Henestrosa Vega
- Date of birth: 19 June 1994 (age 32)
- Place of birth: Oaxaca, Mexico
- Height: 1.66 m (5 ft 5 in)
- Position: Midfielder

Team information
- Current team: Herediano

Youth career
- 2009–2014: Cruz Azul

Senior career*
Years	Team	Apps	(Gls)
2014–2016	Cruz Azul Hidalgo	57	(11)
2016	Chapulineros	8	(1)
2017–2019	UAEM	26	(3)
2018–2019	→ Atlético Reynosa (loan)	34	(3)
2019	Veracruz	9	(0)
2020	Oaxaca	5	(0)
2020–2022	Zacatecas	68	(2)
2023–2024	UdeG	58	(7)
2025–2026	Municipal Liberia	19	(4)
2026	Tepatitlán	4	(0)
2026–	Herediano	0	(0)
- * Club domestic league appearances and goals as of 29 August 2026

Jesús Henestrosa Vega (born 19 June 1994) is a Mexican professional footballer who plays as a midfielder at Liga FPD club Herediano.
