= Fabrizio Ronchetti =

Uruguayan footballer (born 1985)

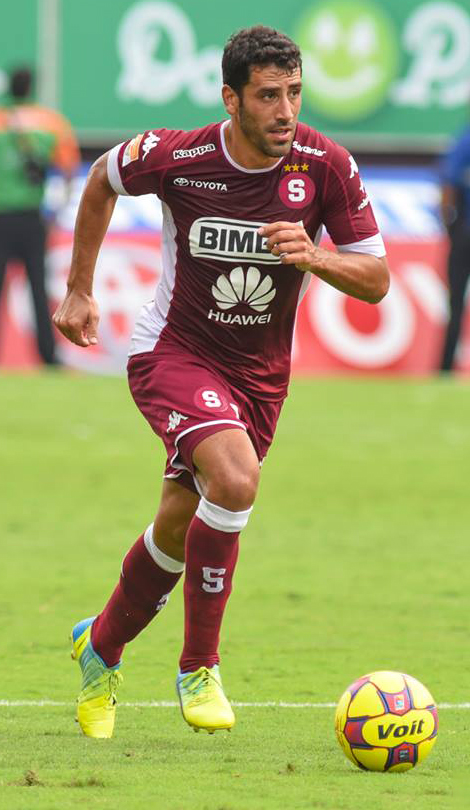
- A full picture of Fabrizio Ronechetti

Personal information
- Full name: Fabrizio Santiago Ronchetti Amaral
- Date of birth: 26 June 1985 (age 41)
- Place of birth: Uruguay
- Position: Forward

Senior career*
| Years | Team | Apps | (Gls) |
- Juventud de Las Piedras
| -2008 | U.S. Adriese | | |
| 2008/2009 | La Luz F.C. | | |
| 2009 | Universidad de Las Palmas CF | 14 | (2) |
| 2009/2010 | Club Plaza Colonia de Deportes | | |
| 2010-2012 | Club Sportivo Cerrito | 5+ | (1+) |
| 2012-2013 | C.D. Suchitepéquez | 40 | (14) |
| 2013 | Club Sportivo Cerrito | 5 | (1) |
| 2014 | A.D. Municipal Pérez Zeledón | 39 | (20) |
| 2014-2016 | C.S. Cartaginés | 52 | (13) |
| 2016-2017 | Deportivo Saprissa | 35 | (12) |
| 2017 | C.S. Cartaginés | 12 | (2) |
| 2018 | A.D. Municipal Pérez Zeledón | 7 | (0) |
| 2018 | A.D. San Carlos | 13 | (1) |
| 2018-2019 | Santos de Guápiles F.C. | 8 | (2) |
| 2019- | A.D. Carmelita | | |
- * Club domestic league appearances and goals

Fabrizio Ronechetti (born 26 June 1985 in Uruguay) is a Uruguayan footballer who now plays for A.D. Carmelita in Costa Rica.

== Career ==
Ronchetti started his senior career with Juventud de Las Piedras. In 2013, he signed for Club Sportivo Cerrito in the Uruguayan Segunda División, where he made five league appearances and scored one goal. After that, A.D. Municipal Pérez Zeledón, C.S. Cartaginés, Deportivo Saprissa, A.D. San Carlos, Santos de Guápiles, and A.D. Carmelita, where he now plays.
