= Néstor Morais =

Uruguayan footballer (born 1980)

Personal information
- Full name: Néstor Fabián Morais González
- Date of birth: 6 March 1980 (age 46)
- Place of birth: Montevideo, Uruguay
- Height: 1.82 m (6 ft 0 in)
- Position: Forward

Senior career*
Years	Team	Apps	(Gls)
2000	Liverpool Montevideo		
2001–2002	Rentistas		
2002	Unión Española	7	(0)
2003	Cerro		
2003–2005	Plaza Colonia		
2005	Envigado	3	(0)
2006–2009	Uruguay Montevideo		
2011	Pérez Zeledón	2	(0)
2011–2012	Progreso	16	(6)
2012	Atlético Policial	3	(0)
2013	Villa Teresa	17	(3)
- * Club domestic league appearances and goals

Néstor Fabián Morais González (born 6 March 1980) is a Uruguayan former professional footballer who played as a forward.

== Teams ==
- (Uruguay) Liverpool 2000
- (Uruguay) Rentistas 2001–2002
- (Chile) Unión Española 2002
- (Uruguay) Cerro 2003
- (Uruguay) Plaza Colonia 2003–2006
- (Colombia) Envigado 2005
- Uruguay Montevideo 2006–2009
- (Costa Rica) Pérez Zeledón 2010–2011
- (Uruguay) Progreso 2011–2012
- (Argentina) Atlético Policial 2012–2013
- (Uruguay) Villa Teresa 2013
