= Municipal Liberia =

Costa Rican football club

- Full name: Asociación Deportiva Municipal Liberia
- Nicknames: Coyotes; Pamperos; Liberianos; Los de la Ciudad Blanca
- Founded: June 7, 1977; 49 years ago
- Ground: Estadio Edgardo Baltodano Briceño
- Capacity: 6,500
- Owner: Grupo Eusse
- Chairman: Juan E. Eusse Salazar
- Manager: José Saturnino Cardozo
- League: Liga Promerica
- Clausura 2026: 8th
- Website: admliberia.com
Home colours	Away colours

Asociación Deportiva Municipal Liberia is a Costa Rican professional football club based in Liberia, Guanacaste. They currently compete in the Liga FPD and play their home matches at the Estadio Edgardo Baltodano Briceño.

== History ==
=== Founding and early years ===
Founded on June 7, 1977, the club began in the second division after purchasing the franchise of Deportivo Fertica. After decades of fluctuating between the second and third divisions, the club finally achieved promotion to the Costa Rican Primera División in 2001.

=== The Sotela Era and first title ===
In 2007, businessman Mario Sotela purchased the club, rebranding it as Liberia Mía. Heavy investment in veteran talent led the team to its first-ever Primera División title in Verano 2009, defeating Herediano 3–0 in the final. However, financial instability led to multiple rebrandings, and the team was eventually expelled by UNAFUT in March 2011 due to mounting debts.

=== Rebirth ===
In mid-2011, the club was refounded as Los Coyotes del Municipal Liberia after acquiring the franchise of AD Desamparados. The club returned to the top flight for the 2015–2016 season and most recently earned promotion again in 2023.

== Colours and Crest ==
=== Uniform ===
Liberia Mia crest badge used during the Sotela era

Municipal Liberia's primary colors are aurum yellow and obsidian black, a combination that has defined the club's visual identity since its founding in 1977.
Aurum Yellow: represents the golden sun of the Guanacaste pampas and the energy of the "Ciudad Blanca" (White City).
Obsidian Black: symbolizes strength and the fierce nature of the Coyote, the club’s primary mascot and namesake.
While the primary kit is yellow and black, the club frequently incorporates pure white into its alternate designs. This is a direct reference to Liberia's nickname, the Ciudad Blanca, historically named for its white gravel streets and colonial buildings made of bahareque.

=== Crest ===
The club's crest is a circular emblem featuring a howling coyote silhouetted against a rising sun. The sun's rays are often depicted as bold, sharp lines that represent the intense heat and spirit of the northern region of Costa Rica. White City Connection.

=== Sponsorship ===
Period	Kit manufacturer	Main sponsor
2024–present	Monarca	Grupo Eusse
2022–2024	Umbro	Coopeguanacaste
2021–2022	Joma	Municipalidad de Liberia
2018–2021	Lotto	Tigo

== Broadcasting ==
Municipal Liberia matches are broadcast through various media outlets in Costa Rica.

Type	Network	Language
TV Cable	FUTV	Spanish
Radio	Columbia Deportiva	Spanish
Streaming	FUTV / App	Spanish

== Stadium ==
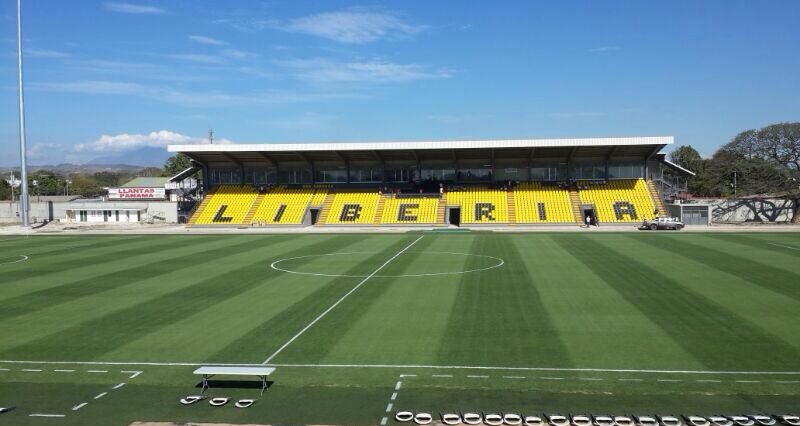
Front view of the Edgardo Baltodano Stadium.

The stadium was built in 1970 and is owned by the Municipality of Liberia. It underwent major renovations in 2013 to serve as a host venue for the 2014 FIFA U-17 Women's World Cup. It has a capacity of 6,500 spectators.

== Club culture ==
=== Rivalries ===
==== Clásico de la Pampa ====
The club's primary rival is A.D. Guanacasteca, with whom they contest the Clásico de la Pampa. The rivalry is deeply rooted in regional identity, as both clubs represent the Guanacaste province but hail from different socio-economic hubs—Liberia (the "White City") and Nicoya (the "Colonial City").

The first encounter in the Primera División took place on August 3, 2002, resulting in a 2–1 victory for Guanacasteca. After ADG's relegation in 2004, the derby was largely played in the Segunda División for nearly two decades. The rivalry returned to the top flight in September 2023, following Liberia's promotion, an event celebrated by the league as a restoration of Guanacaste's footballing heritage.

Head-to-head statistics As of March 26, 2026

Competition	Played	Liberia wins	Draws	ADG wins
Primera División	18	3	6	9
Segunda División	18	4	3	11
Total	36	7	9	20

==== Club Sport Herediano ====
While not a traditional regional derby, the matches between Municipal Liberia and CS Herediano carry significant historical weight. During the late 2000s, the two clubs shared a close administrative and sporting relationship, leading fans and the media to dub Herediano as Liberia's "Big Brother."

This relationship reached its peak—and its most ironic moment—during the 2008–09 Verano Championship. In a historic final, Municipal Liberia (then known as Liberia Mía) defeated Herediano 3–0 in the second leg at the Estadio Eladio Rosabal Cordero to claim their first-ever Primera División title. The victory remains one of the greatest upsets in Costa Rican football history, as the "younger brother" claimed the trophy on the "big brother's" home turf.

Head-to-head statistics As of March 2026

Competition	Played	Liberia wins	Draws	Herediano wins
Primera División	35	8	6	21

== Players ==
=== Current squad ===
As of 16 March 2026

Note: Flags indicate national team as defined under FIFA eligibility rules; some limited exceptions apply. Players may hold more than one non-FIFA nationality.

No.	Pos.	Nation	Player
1	GK	MEX	Antonny Monreal
3	DF	CRC	Douglas Sequeira (on loan from Deportivo Saprissa)
4	MF	CRC	Jared Ríos
5	DF	CRC	Yeison Molina
6	MF	CRC	Ricardo Peña
7	DF	CRC	Shawn Johnson (on loan from Herediano)
10	MF	CRC	Yoserth Hernández
11	FW	MEX	Erick Torres
12	FW	CRC	Jefferson Sánchez
15	DF	NCA	Christian Reyes
16	FW	USA	Alonso Hernández
19	MF	PAR	Thobías Arévalo
21	FW	COL	Lorenzo Orellano

No.	Pos.	Nation	Player
22	FW	CRC	Abner Hudson
23	GK	CRC	Daniel Villegas
24	DF	CRC	Waylon Francis
27	DF	CRC	Adrián Chévez
30	DF	CRC	Joaquín Huertas
31	MF	CRC	Sebastián Padilla
32	GK	CRC	Joel Castrillo
33	FW	PAR	Fernando Lesme (on loan from Celaya)
34	MF	MEX	Jesús Henestrosa
39	MF	CRC	Mauricio Villalobos
42	DF	CRC	John Ruiz (on loan from Alajuelense)
70	DF	CRC	Daniel Chacón (on loan from Alajuelense)
99	FW	CRC	Randy Ramírez

=== Notable players ===
Name
(Costa Rica)	Víctor Núñez
(Costa Rica)	Daniel Colindres
(Costa Rica)	Michael Umaña
(Costa Rica)	Alonso Solís
(Costa Rica)	Marvin Angulo
(Costa Rica)	Mínor Díaz

Name
(Costa Rica)	Harold Wallace
(France)	Jacques Rémy
(Costa Rica)	Cristian Gamboa
(Costa Rica)	Alejandro Alpízar
(Costa Rica)	Kenneth García
(Costa Rica)	Walter Chévez

Name
(Costa Rica)	Pablo Salazar
(Panama)	Pércival Piggott
(Paraguay)	Fernando Lesme
(Mexico)	Antonny Monreal
(Mexico)	Erick Torres

== Coaches ==
=== Coaching staff ===
Coaching staff
Head coach	(Paraguay) José Cardozo
Assistant coach	(Uruguay) Fabrizio Ronchetti
Assistant coach	(Costa Rica) Kevin Obando
Fitness coach	(Argentina) Gabriel Patat
Goalkeeper coach	(Costa Rica) Erick Sanchez
Sporting Director	(Costa Rica) Hancer Zuñiga

=== Head coach history ===
The following is a list of Municipal Liberia managers from 2007 to the present.

Coach	Tenure	
(Paraguay) José Cardozo	Feb 2025	Present
(Uruguay) Fabrizio Ronchetti	Jan 2025	Feb 2025
(Costa Rica) Mínor Díaz	Oct 2021	Jan 2025
(Costa Rica) Marvin Solano	Apr 2021	Oct 2021
(Costa Rica) Christian Oviedo	Sep 2020	Apr 2021
(Spain) Miguel Ulecia	Feb 2020	Sep 2020
(Argentina) Carlos de Toro	Jul 2019	Aug 2019
(Brazil) Flávio da Silva	Jul 2018	Dec 2018

Coach	Tenure	
(Costa Rica) Erick Rodríguez	Feb 2018	Apr 2018
(Uruguay) Víctor Abelenda	Nov 2017	Jan 2018
(Costa Rica) Vinicio Alvarado	Aug 2017	Nov 2017
(Costa Rica) Marvin Solano	Aug 2016	Mar 2017
(Mexico) Gustavo Martínez	Aug 2015	Oct 2015
(Uruguay) Orlando de León	Feb 2015	Aug 2015
(France) Alain Gay-Hardy	Jul 2008	Dec 2009
(Colombia) Carlos Restrepo	Jan 2008	Jun 2008

== Honours ==
Competition	Titles	Seasons
Primera División de Costa Rica	1	Verano 2009
Segunda División de Costa Rica	3	2000–01, 2014–15, 2022–23
Costa Rican Third Division	1	1985

== Records ==
=== Year-by-year ===
The following table lists the club's performance in national competitions since its return to the Liga FPD in 2023.

Season	Domestic League								Domestic Cup
Season	Pld	W	D	L	GF	GA	Pts	Position	Domestic Cup
2023–24	44	15	14	15	63	75	59	9th (A) / 5th (C)	Quarter-finals
2024–25	44	14	8	22	52	60	50	8th (A) / 7th (C)	Round of 16
2025–26	33	14	9	10	44	42	51	Semi-finals (A)	Semi-finals

- Note: The 2025–26 Clausura season is currently in progress. League statistics reflect the completed Apertura 2025 (including playoffs) and the Clausura regular season through March 2026.

=== International competitions ===
The following is a list of all international competitions in which Municipal Liberia has participated.

Year	Competition	Round	Opponent	Home	Away	Aggregate
2009–10	CONCACAF Champions League	Preliminary round	(Honduras) Real España	3–0	0–6	3–6
