= Ariel Segalla =

Argentine footballer

Ariel Rubén Segalla (born 8 February 1976) is an Argentine former professional footballer who played as a midfielder.

== Career ==
- Colón de Santa Fe 1997–2000
- Palestino 2000–2002
- Universidad de Concepción 2003
- C.S. Cartaginés 2004
- Comunicaciones 2005
- 9 de Julio de Rafaela 2005–2006
- Patronato de Paraná 2006–2007
- C.S. Cartaginés 2007
- Luján de Cuyo 2008
- San Luis Quillota 2008–2009
