= Kanga Nzeza =

Democratic Republic of the Congo footballer

Personal information
- Full name: Pitshou Kangza Nzeza
- Date of birth: 1973 (age 52–53)
- Place of birth: Democratic Republic of the Congo
- Position: Striker

Senior career*
Years	Team	Apps	(Gls)
- Juan Aurich
- Club Olimpia
-1999	Kaizer Chiefs F.C.		
1999-2000	C.S. Cartaginés		
- * Club domestic league appearances and goals

Kangza Nzeza (born in 1973 in the Democratic Republic of the Congo) is a Democratic Republic of the Congo retired footballer.
