= Santiago Aloi =

Argentine footballer (born 1987)

Personal information
- Date of birth: 26 March 1987 (age 39)
- Place of birth: Villa María, Argentina
- Height: 1.75 m (5 ft 9 in)
- Position: Midfielder

Team information
- Current team: TuS Bersenbrück
- Number: 27

Youth career
- River Plate

Senior career*
Years	Team	Apps	(Gls)
2006–2008	River Plate	0	(0)
2007–2008	→ Watford (loan)	0	(0)
2008–2009	Belgrano	1	(0)
2009–2012	Municipal Liberia	2	(0)
2012–2014	Alumni	18	(2)
2014	Kidderminster Harriers	4	(0)
2014	→ Worcester City (loan)	6	(0)
2014–2015	Mitre	14	(2)
2015–2017	Instituto	1	(0)
2017–2018	Inter Leipzig	41	(9)
2018	Chemnitzer FC	0	(0)
2018–2019	Schwarz-Weiß Rehden	21	(4)
2019–	TuS Bersenbrück	93	(14)
- * Club domestic league appearances and goals as of 1 July 2024

Santiago Aloi (born 25 March 1987) is an Argentine footballer who plays as a midfielder for German Oberliga Niedersachsen club TuS Bersenbrück.

Beginning his career in his native Argentina with River Plate, Aloi spent the 2007–08 season on loan with Watford in the Football League Championship. He later returned to South America, playing in his homeland as well as representing Municipal Liberia in the Costa Rican Primera División. In 2014, he returned to England with Kidderminster Harriers and spent a month on loan at Worcester City.

== Career ==
Aloi was spotted by Watford scouts in May 2007 and was signed on loan on 31 August 2007 with a view to a permanent deal. However, he never appeared for the first team and did not join permanently. He made just one substitute appearance in the Primera B Nacional for Belgrano before heading to Costa Rica, where he appeared twice in the Primera División for Municipal Liberia. He went on trial with Scottish side Falkirk in 2011.

In 2012 Aloi returned to Argentina with hometown club Alumni in the third division of Argentine football. He played 14 times, scoring 2 goals. His good form attracted the attention of Milton Keynes Dons manager Karl Robinson who offered Aloi a trial at the club in the summer of 2013. No permanent deal materialised and after another year with Alumni playing four more times, Aloi returned to the United Kingdom with Conference Premier side Kidderminster Harriers in January 2014. In March, he signed a month-long loan deal with Worcester City where he played 6 times.

He returned to his homeland to play for Club Atlético Mitre in July 2014.
