= Alain Gay-Hardy =

French footballer (born 1949)

Personal information
- Date of birth: 23 December 1949 (age 76)
- Place of birth: Avignon, France
- Position: Midfielder

Senior career*
Years	Team	Apps	(Gls)
–1968	Quevilly-Rouen		
1968–1975	Amiens		
1975–1977	Quevilly-Rouen		
1981–1984	AC Avignon		

Managerial career
- 1981–1984: AC Avignon
- 1985–1990: Carpentras
- 2008–2009: Municipal Liberia
- * Club domestic league appearances and goals

Alain Gay-Hardy (born 23 December 1949) is a French former football player and manager.

== Playing career ==
A midfielder, Gay-Hardy started his career with French third tier side Quevilly-Rouen, helping them reach the semi-finals of the 1967–68 Coupe de France.

== Managerial career ==
In 1981, Gay-Hardy was appointed manager of AC Avignon in the French third tier, where he suffered relegation to the French fourth tier.

In 1985, he was appointed manager of French sixth tier club Carpentras, helping them earn promotion to the French fifth tier. In 2008, Gay-Hardy was appointed manager of Liberia in the Costa Rican top flight, helping them win their only league title.
