= Thomas Alder (footballer) =

Swiss footballer (born 1970)

Personal information
- Date of birth: 9 September 1970 (age 56)
- Place of birth: Switzerland
- Position: Goalkeeper

Senior career*
Years	Team	Apps	(Gls)
1992–1994	FC Gossau		
1994–1995	FC Wil		
1995–1996	SC Brühl		
1996–2001	St. Gallen	22	(0)
2001	Carmelita		
- * Club domestic league appearances and goals

Thomas Alder (born 9 September 1970) is a Swiss former professional footballer who played as a goalkeeper.

== Career ==
In 1992, Alder signed for Swiss third division side FC Gossau. In 1996, he signed for St. Gallen in the Swiss top flight, where he made 24 appearances. On 14 April 1997, Alder debuted for St. Gallen during a 8–0 loss to Grasshoppers. In 2001, he signed for Costa Rican club Carmelita.
