= Red Guaraní =

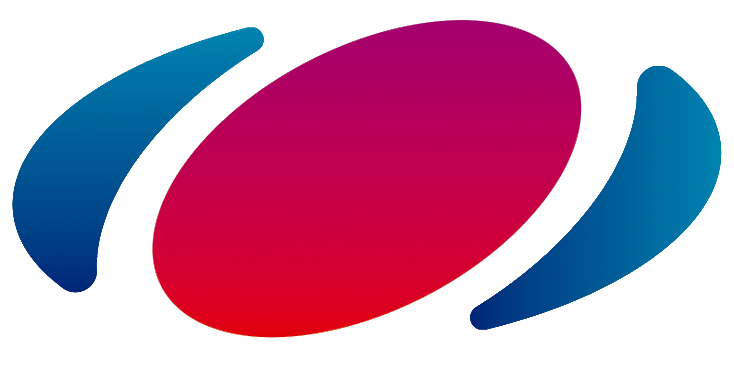
- Country: Paraguay
- Broadcast area: Paraguay
- Headquarters: Asunción, Paraguay

Programming
- Picture format: 1080i HDTV

Ownership
- Owner: A.J. Vierci Group

History
- Launched: 12 November 1997; 28 years ago
- Closed: 1 January 2019; 7 years ago

Availability

Terrestrial
- Analog VHF: Channel 2 (Asunción and Gran Asunción, listings may vary)
- Digital UHF: Channel 18.1 (HD)

Red Guaraní was a Paraguayan over-the-air television channel owned by Grupo Vierci, launched on 1 July 2002. It was available nationwide thanks to 28 relay stations. It shut down on 1 January 2019, being replaced, depending on the provider, by Noticias PY or E40 TV.

== History ==
Tevedos was created by Cámara Paraguaya de Exportadores y Comercializadores de Cereales y Oleaginosa (Capeco)'s subsidiary CapecoVisión S.A., having as its main shareholder José Luis Manzoni Wasmosy, cousin of former president of the Republic, Juan Carlos Wasmosy, to whom his government used television as a propaganda outlet. Tevedos had a pivotal role in the restoration of SNT's broadcasts in March 1998, after a tornado knocked down its transmitter. The channel faced constant problems in its management, causing it to be sold to new partners, UIises Aristides and Dany Espinola Durand, on 7 March 2002. The relaunch as Red Guaraní was scheduled for 14 May the country's independence day. When the administration changed, 45% of its output was produced by the station, including programming aimed at women, game shows, youth programs and news bulletins. The two were attending the 2002 MipTV to find new international partners. Ulises was also president of Bakus, a distributor of SBT's content.

In January 2003, its owners accepted a sale to Obedira Comunicación Integral (now Red de Comunicación Integral), a Mennonite Evangelical media company, headed by Arnoldo Wiens Durksen and journalist Oscar Escobar Morínigo, who was in charge of operation. Obedira was one of the entities who demanded that, in late 2002, Red Guaraní should remove Playboy's pornographic program, which would cause adverse effects to the youth.

The Obedira management, during its decade of control, had a "very precise" idea of what shouldn't be shown on television. While defending family values, Red Guaraní refused to air commercials for cigarettes, alcoholic beverages and gambling. The channel protected its viewers against these vices. The telenovelas aired were mostly Korean period dramas. Commercial breaks featured religious messages.

On 31 December 2013, the channel was sold to Grupo A.J. Vierci's subsidiary Team, and announced changes to its output, removing its Christian programming. The channel shut down on 1 January 2019, with its terrestrial signal being replaced by Noticias PY, up until then a cable channel. The former cable slot of NPY in its place was replaced by E40 TV.
