= Sergio Reina =

Colombian footballer (born 1985)

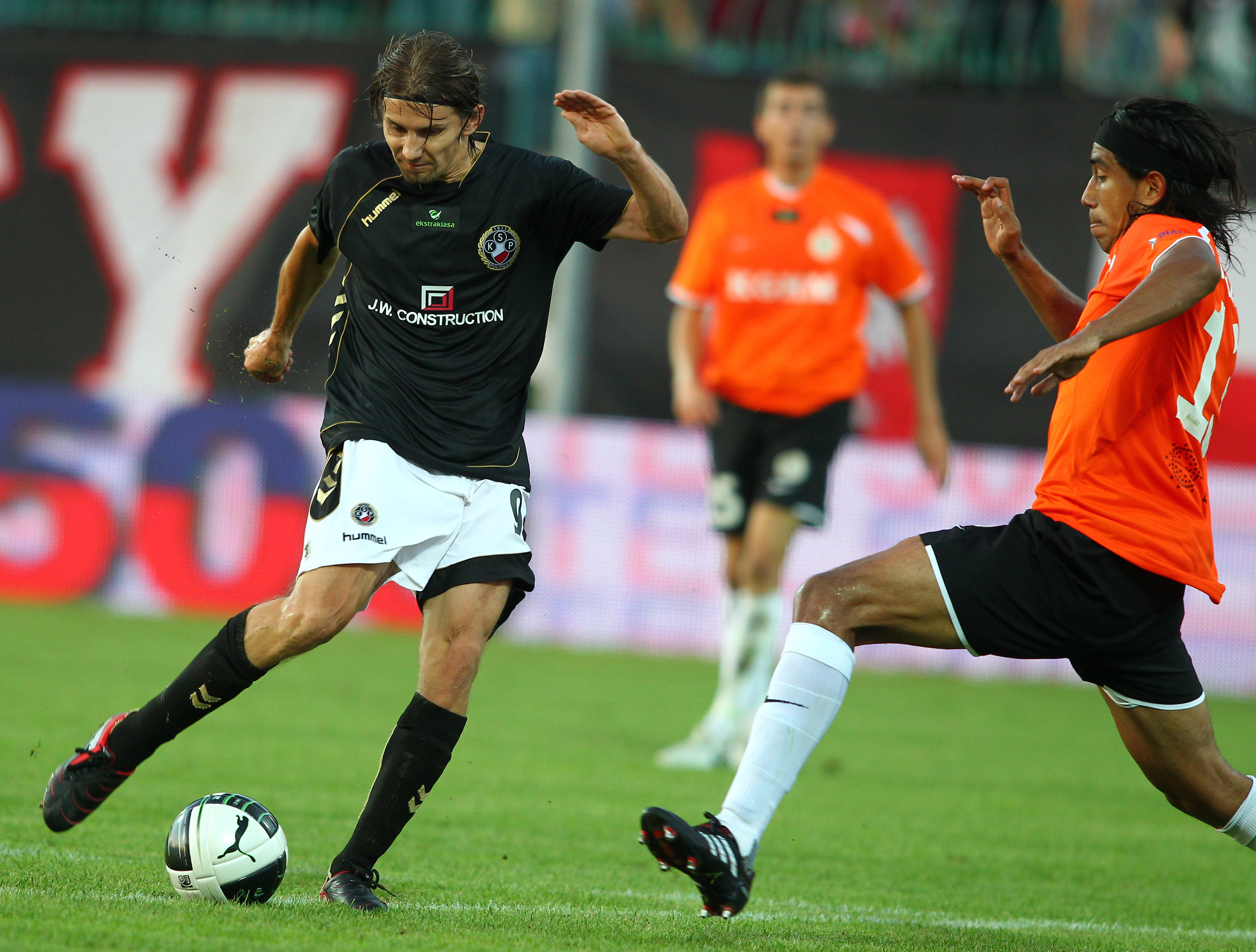
- Reina (right)

Personal information
- Full name: Sergio Mauricio Reyna Piedrahita
- Date of birth: January 26, 1985 (age 41)
- Place of birth: Cali, Colombia
- Height: 1.87 m (6 ft 1 1/2 in)
- Position: Defender

Senior career*
Years	Team	Apps	(Gls)
2004–2005	América de Cali		
2005–2006	Pumas de Casanare		
2006–2008	Depor		
2006–2007	→ C.S. Cartaginés (loan)		
2008–2009	Patriotas	3	(1)
2009	Inti Gas Deportes	42	(4)
2010–2013	Zagłębie Lubin	48	(0)
2013	Patriotas	11	(0)
2013	Blooming	11	(0)
- * Club domestic league appearances and goals as of 6 May 2011

Sergio Mauricio Reina Piedrahita (born January 26, 1985) is a Colombian football defender, lastly playing for Club Blooming in the Bolivian first division and currently a free agent.

== Career ==
In January 2010 Zaglebie Lubin signed the centre-back from Peruvian club Inti Gas Deportes. 14.01.2013 he joined Patriotas F.C.
