= Alexis Esparza =

Argentine footballer

Personal information
- Full name: Alexis Gabriel Esparza
- Date of birth: June 20, 1993 (age 33)
- Place of birth: Cipolletti, Argentina
- Height: 1.72 m (5 ft 8 in)
- Position: Forward

Senior career*
Years	Team	Apps	(Gls)
2011–2014	Cipolletti	24	(2)
2013–2014	→ Alianza Cutral Có (loan)	21	(5)
2015	Independiente	13	(0)
2016	Cartaginés		
2016	Naval		
2017–2018	Deportivo La Amistad	42	(4)
- * Club domestic league appearances and goals

Alexis Gabriel Esparza (born June 20, 1993, in Cipolletti (Río Negro), Argentina) is an Argentine footballer who currently plays for Naval of the Segunda División Profesional in Chile.

== Teams ==
- (Argentina) Cipolletti 2012–2015
- (Argentina) Independiente de Neuquén 2015
- (Costa Rica) Cartaginés 2016
- (Chile) Naval 2016–present
