= Alex Campana =

English footballer (born 1988)

Personal information
- Full name: Alessandro Campana
- Date of birth: 11 October 1988 (age 38)
- Place of birth: Harrow, England
- Positions: Right midfielder; striker

Senior career*
Years	Team	Apps	(Gls)
2005–2008	Watford	0	(0)
2007–2008	→ Wealdstone (loan)	8	(4)
2008	Grays Athletic	3	(0)
2008	Wivenhoe Town	7	(6)
2008–2009	Thurrock		
2009	Enfield Town	16	(4)
2009	Hemel Hempstead Town		
2012–2014	Hemel Hempstead Town	37	(4)
2013–2014	→ Kings Langley (loan)	23	(29)
2014–2015	Kings Langley	49	(25)
2015–2018	Berkhamsted	100	(28)
2018–2019	Tring Athletic	16	(1)
- * Club domestic league appearances and goals as of 17:13, 24 January 2022 (UTC)

Alessandro Campana (born 11 October 1988) is an English footballer who last played for Tring Athletic. He is a right midfielder or striker.

== Career ==
Campana started his career at Watford's Academy but made his first–team debut on 23 August 2005 against Notts County whilst still a first year scholar. He came on as a substitute for Ashley Young, in a weakened side played in the League Cup first round fixture.

Campana did not make a first team appearance in Watford's 2006–07 Premiership season. However, he captained the club's under-18 side, and was a regular in the reserves. He signed his first professional contract with Watford on 18 April 2007.

Campana's next first-team appearance came on 14 August 2007, coming on as a substitute in a League Cup tie at home to Gillingham. He went on to score his first professional goal, a header and the third in Watford's 3–0 win. He made his first start for the club in the next round, a 2–0 loss away at Southend United.

On 1 December 2007 Campana joined Isthmian League side Wealdstone on a month's loan. This was in order for him to play competitive football in a gap in reserve team fixtures. Campana made a total of 8 league and cup appearances for Wealdstone scoring 4 goals.

Campana joined Grays Athletic at the start of the 2008–09 season, making his debut on 9 August 2008 in the 3–1 away defeat to Weymouth, coming on as a substitute. He had his contract terminated by mutual consent on 21 October 2008, and signed for Eastern Counties League Premier Division side Wivenhoe Town. A month later, Campana signed for Thurrock who play in the Conference South league, and made his debut versus Bromley on 29 November 2008. Campana terminated his contract with Thurrock in February 2009. He then joined Isthmian League side Enfield Town.

After initially joining Hemel Hempstead Town in 2009, Alex left the club to focus on his university studies. Whilst at University, Campana was selected for the Great Britain Universities Futsal Team, representing the side at the World University Championships in Serbia.

Campana rejoined Hemel Hempstead Town in July 2012, joining Kings Langley on loan for the 2013–14 season before signing for them permanently following their promotion to the Spartan South Midlands Premier Division in 2014.

In November 2015, Campana left Kings Langley to sign for Berkhamsted. In the summer of 2018 Campana left Berkhamsted after their promotion to the Southern Football League, moving to Spartan South Midlands Premier Division side Tring Athletic.
