= Assis (footballer, born 1979) =

Brazilian footballer

Personal information
- Full name: Luciano Xavier Cunha
- Date of birth: 27 February 1979 (age 47)
- Place of birth: Irati, Brazil
- Height: 1.71 m (5 ft 7 1/2 in)
- Position: Striker

Senior career*
Years	Team	Apps	(Gls)
–2003	Iraty Sport Club		
2003	Spartak Ivano-Frankivsk	12	(7)
2004	L.D. Alajuelense		
2004–2005	Spartak Ivano-Frankivsk	26	(2)
2006–2007	Dibba Al-Fujairah		
2007	Goiânia Esporte Clube		
2008	Palmas Futebol e Regatas		
- * Club domestic league appearances and goals as of 10.03.2011

Luciano Xavier Cunha, known as Assis (born 27 February 1979), is a Brazilian footballer.

Luciano made his professional debut for Iraty Sport Club in the Campeonato Paranaense. In August 2003 Luciano transferred to Spartak Ivano-Frankivsk. After, he played for L.D. Alajuelense in Costa Rica. Luciano was transferred from the United Arab Emirates side Dibba Al-Fujairah Cultural S.C. to Goiânia Esporte Clube on March 8, 2007 He spent the following season with Palmas Futebol e Regatas in the Campeonato Tocantinense.
