= Impôts FC =

Cameroonian football club

- Full name: Impôts Football Club
- Founded: 2000; 25 years ago
- Ground: Stade Municipal; Yaoundé, Cameroon
- Capacity: 5,000
- League: Cameroon Second Division
- 2005/06: Cameroon Premiere Division, 14th (Relegated)
Home colours

Impôts FC is a Cameroonian football club based in Yaoundé. They are a member of the Cameroonian Football Federation. They won the 2005 Coupe de Cameroun, winning unexpectedly from the second division, with a 1-0 win over Unisport Bafang.

The club was relegated from Cameroon Premiere Division in 2006.

== Honours ==
- Cameroon Première Division: 0
- Cameroon Cup: 1

2005.

- Super Coupe Roger Milla: 0

== Performance in CAF competitions ==
- CAF Confederation Cup: 1 appearance

2006 – Preliminary Round
