= Antonio J. Vierci =

Paraguayan businessman

- Born: 1 June 1945 (age 81); Asunción, Paraguay

Antonio Juan Bautista Vierci Mendoza (Asunción, June 1, 1945) known as Antonio J. Vierci or A. J. Vierci, is a Paraguayan businessman and CEO, owner of several media outlets in Paraguay, such as Telefuturo, Radio Monumental 1080 AM, Diario Extra, Última Hora and Estación 40. He is the founder and executive director of Grupo Vierci; ownes the local franchises of Burger King and Domino's Pizza among others, and is considered to be among the richest businessmen of his country.

== Biography ==
=== Origins and family context ===
Antonio J. Vierci was born on June 1, 1945, in Asunción, Paraguay. He is married to Ana María Yakisich, with whom he had a son. The Vierci family is of Genovese origin and has a commercial tradition. His ancestors immigrated to the La Plata River in the mid 19th century. His father, Juan Bautista Vierci, was a businessman in the yerba mate sector, owner of plantations which hired workers known as mensú. His commercial activity covered Paraguay, Brazil, Argentina , Bolivia and Uruguay.

=== Career ===
In 1967, age 22 and just married, Antonio J. Vierci started his business activity in an independenr manner. He installed his first office in the family's residence at Colón Street, Asunción, where his wife worked as a typewriter. His first operations consisted in the acquisition of products from the port area of Garibaldi Street, Asunción, to resell them in the city of Pedro Juan Caballero. In parallel, he resumed his yerba mate family business. The Argentine newspaper La Nación reported in 2018 that Vierci's links with the dictatorial regime of Alfredo Stroessner allowed him to conduct smuggling operations and other business ventures outside the margins of the law.

In 1997, he founded Telefuturo. Later, in 2003, he acquired Editorial País, which included Última Hora and Radio Guarania 91.1 FM, the latter of which was renamed, first as Radio La Estación, later as Estación 40. In 2005, he launched Radio Urbana 106.9 FM. Later, in 2008, he founded La Tele, which in its early years was legally owned by a Panamanian offshore. Two years later, in 2010, he acquired Radio Nanawa 1080 AM (renamed Radio Monumental 1080 AM). In 2012, he incorporated digital platforms Paraguay.com and Clasipar.com. In 2013, he acquired Red Guaraní, channel 2. Later, in 2016, he acquired Diario Extra Press. In the next year, in 2017, he acquired Radio Global Mix 106.5 FM (renamed Radio Palma 106.5 FM). Finally, in 2022, he acquired Radio Chaco Boreal 1330 AM.

== A. J. Vierci ==
The A. J. Vierci company was founded in 1967. At the beginning, the company distributed national and imported products, and over time it incorporated a variety of industries, such as beverages, electronics and technology. This expansion was achieved with the creation of independent companies such as Láser Import and Compañía de Desarrollo Agropecuario.

In the 1980s and 90s, A. J. Vierci began exporting yerba mate, coffee, soy and natural essences, whereas locally, it increased its offer with the importing household items from China, Lee jeans, wines and liquors. He also established strategic alliances with companies such as Yerbatera Campesino y Boston, consolidating his market position.

In the early 2000s, the group launched Centro de Distribución San Antonio, a 16,000 square meter technologically capable center, able to dispatch requests within 24 hours in any point of the country. This development strengthened the company's distribution efforts, which enabled it to gain offices in Argentina, Bolivia, Chile and Uruguay, as well as subsidiaries in the largest cities of Paraguay. As of 2018, the conglomerate empoloys over 1000 people and continues diversifying its investments in areas such as real estate,the food industry and retail.

The group acquired Supermercados Stock in 2003 for the sum of US$4 million. His media assets include companies such as Telefuturo, Última Hora, Radio Monumental 1080 AM and Estación 40.

As of 2017, Grupo Vierci operates in five key sectors: importers, media, retail, investments and industries. This diversified business model includes companies such as Superseis, Burger King (local franchise), Embutidos Franz and Yerbatera Campesino, among others.
