= FUTV =

Costa Rican television channel

- Country: Costa Rica

Programming
- Picture format: 1080i HDTV (downscaled to 480i for the SDTV feed)

Ownership
- Owner: Teletica; Repretel

History
- Launched: February 29, 2020; 6 years ago

FUTV is a Costa Rican soccer television channel. It started broadcasting on February 29, 2020 and is a joint operation of Repretel and Teletica.

== History ==
On September 28, 2019, Costa Rican media informed that the Teletica and Repretel networks were jointly planning the creation of a dedicated subscription television network dedicated to Costa Rican soccer (the Primera División), having as its expectation starting alongside the 2020-21 season with nine clubs. Facing the rumors given by social media, on October 2, Repretel's president Fernando Contreras, announced that the channel would become reality and discarded the hypothesis of being a joint company, instead, both television companies would serve as providers with their technical equipment and commentators.

On December 13, 2019, it was revealed that the name of the channel would be FUTV and was presented alongside teams, commercial partners of the TV networks and people associated to soccer. Also, it became known that its location would be in Escazú where a specialist who worked with ESPN would assume the project.

On January 23, 2020, the channel was officially launched on cable companies and Teletica and Repretel's teams ceded their television rights. It formally launched on February 29 under the directorate of its president Gabriel Vargas, supporter of director of strategy Rodolfo Travers.
