= Telefuturo =

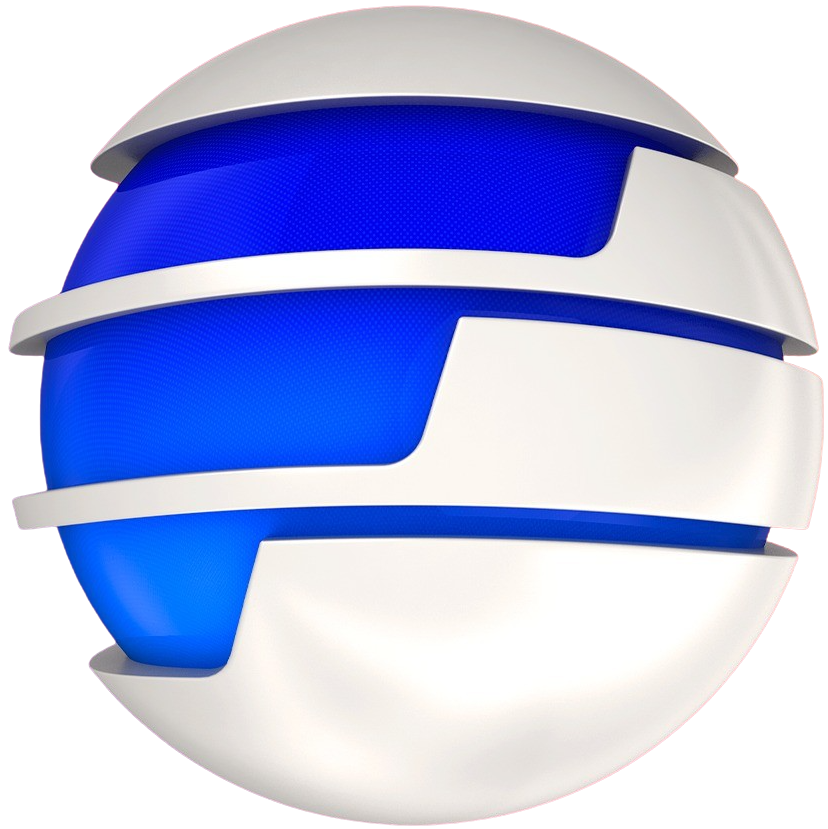
- Country: Paraguay
- Headquarters: Asunción, Paraguay

Programming
- Picture format: 1080i HDTV

Ownership
- Owner: A.J. Vierci Group
- Sister channels: La Tele, Noticias PY, E40 TV, Palma TV

History
- Launched: 12 November 1997; 28 years ago

Links
- Website: https://www.telefuturo.com.py/

Availability

Terrestrial
- Analog VHF: Channel 4 (Asunción and Gran Asunción, listings may vary)
- Digital UHF: Channel 18.1 (HD)

Telefuturo, sometimes known as Canal 4, is a Paraguayan television network. The station operates on physical channel 18.1 in Asunción, and reaches almost the entire population of Paraguay. Telefuturo's coverage reaches almost all the Región Oriental, where approximately 97% of the population of Paraguay lives. Since its inception it maintained a steady growth and currently has 14 repeaters.

As of 2024, the network employs close to 500 staff and is a leader in local television production, including the production of Paraguayan fiction. That year, it also launched its streaming service.

== History ==
In early November 1997, TV Acción S.A. announced the launch of Telefuturo on November 12. TeleFuturo has national coverage by means of four signal repeaters, relayed by satellite, and a daily schedule of 14 hours, from 11am to 1am. Content at launch included programs from the Televisa catalog, TV series from Universal, feature films and children's programming. The channel was associated to Televisa at launch and held a launch party in Asunción at the Yacht and Golf Club Paraguayo, attended by over 1,500 guests from all over South America, including important executives, singers and Televisa talents. The network was founded by Led Monteiro, creating the network from scratch out of his own initiative. Within a year, Telefuturo became a success.

In February 2000, Telefuturo announced the expansion of its national signal to 23 new locations in remote areas. This was to achieve three goals: the completion of the national transmitting network, consolidation of the channel's quality and serving the TV audience in its demand for a national television network that reflected viewers' needs and expectations.

It was the most-watched network in 2003, with 44% of the audience share, and aimed to increase its national programming in 2004.

The channel appointed Bolivian Eric Jurgensen as its director of programming in 2000, up until then he worked at Bolivia's ATB. He left the network and returned to Bolivia in 2001, where he was set to become director of Red Uno from January 2002.

The network's first fiction, González vs. Bonetti (or GvsB) aired in the first half of 2005. It lasted for a single season of twelve episodes and was repeated in November 2015.

On October 19, 2016, Telefuturo launched its high-definition over-the-air signal on channel 18.1 in Asunción and its metropolitan area.

On November 11, 2017, the channel celebrated its 20th anniversary with a special gala, beginning with the Blue Carpet and during such, the channel's branding was changed.

On November 11, 2022, the date of its 25th anniversary, the channel changed its branding and aesthetic. It also launched its first digital terrestrial relay station for Ciudad del Este and its surroundings. In September 2024, Telefuturo launched TF Stream, an online streaming channel with a twelve-hour schedule, consisting of exclusive programming.

The network will hold the inaugural local edition of Big Brother in 2027, Gran Hermano Paraguay.

== Programming ==
=== News ===
- Día a Día
- Meridiano Informativo
- Telediario
- La Lupa
- AAM

=== Sports ===
- Telefútbol
- Coche a la Vista
- El Deportivo
- Fútbol a lo Grande TV

=== Variety ===
- Vive la Vida
- Vive la Tarde

=== Entertainment ===
- Baila Conmigo Paraguay
- El Conejo
- Dragon Ball
- The Simpsons
- 9-1-1
- MasterChef Paraguay
- Secretos de familia
- Amor en alquiler
- Margarita
- Renacer
- Perdidos en el amor
- Polémica en el Bar Paraguay
- Telembopi
- Yo me Llamo

=== Upcoming programs ===
- La Voz... Paraguay (reality show)
- Got Talent Paraguay (reality show)
