= 2017 CONCACAF League final =

- Event: 2017 CONCACAF League
Olimpia	Santos de Guápiles
(Honduras)	(Costa Rica)
1	1
- on aggregate Olimpia won 4–1 on penalties

First leg
Olimpia	Santos de Guápiles
0	1
- Date: 19 October 2017
- Venue: Estadio Olímpico Metropolitano, San Pedro Sula
- Referee: Ismail Elfath (United States)
- Attendance: 0
- Weather: Mostly cloudy 26 °C (79 °F); 100% humidity

Second leg
Santos de Guápiles	Olimpia
0	1
- Date: 26 October 2017
- Venue: Estadio Nacional de Costa Rica, San José
- Referee: Luis Enrique Santander (Mexico)
- Attendance: 10,460
- Weather: Rain; 19 °C (66 °F); 100% humidity

The 2017 CONCACAF League final was the final round of the 2017 CONCACAF League, the inaugural edition of the CONCACAF League, the secondary club football tournament organised by CONCACAF, the regional governing body of North America, Central America, and the Caribbean.

The final was contested in two-legged home-and-away format between Olimpia from Honduras and Santos de Guápiles from Costa Rica. The first leg was hosted by Olimpia at the Estadio Olímpico Metropolitano in San Pedro Sula on 19 October 2017, while the second leg was hosted by Santos de Guápiles at the Estadio Nacional de Costa Rica in San José on 26 October 2017.

With Santos de Guápiles winning the first leg and Olimpia winning the second leg, both by the score of 1–0, the tie finished 1–1 on aggregate, and Olimpia won 4–1 on a penalty shoot-out to win the title. As CONCACAF League winners, Olimpia qualified for the 2018 CONCACAF Champions League.

== Teams ==
Team	Zone
(Honduras) Olimpia	Central America (UNCAF)
(Costa Rica) Santos de Guápiles	Central America (UNCAF)

While Olimpia were the only team to have competed in all nine editions in the CONCACAF Champions League era since 2008, and would continue this streak if they won the final, Santos de Guápiles had never competed in the CONCACAF Champions League and had the chance to qualify for the first time.

== Venues ==
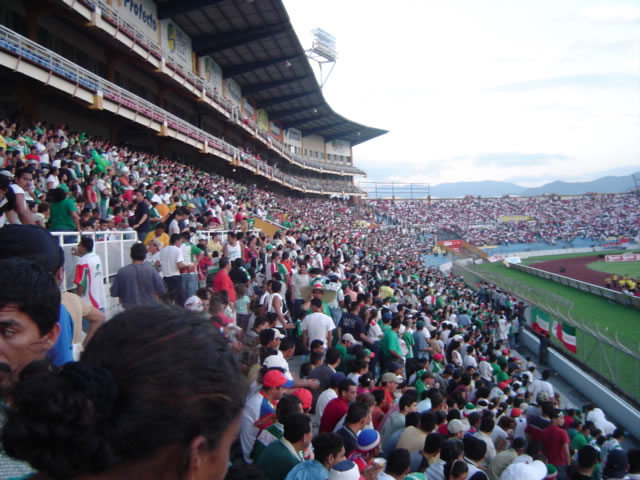
Estadio Olímpico Metropolitano in San Pedro Sula, Honduras, hosted the first leg.

Estadio Nacional de Costa Rica in San José, Costa Rica, hosted the second leg.

== Road to the final ==
Note: In all results below, the score of the finalist is given first (H: home; A: away).

(Honduras) Olimpia				Round	(Costa Rica) Santos de Guápiles			
Opponent	Agg.	1st leg	2nd leg	2017 CONCACAF League	Opponent	Agg.	1st leg	2nd leg
(Costa Rica) Alajuelense	3–0	2–0 (H)	1–0 (A)	Round of 16	(Trinidad and Tobago) San Juan Jabloteh	8–3	6–2 (H)	2–1 (A)
(El Salvador) Alianza	3–2	0–1 (A)	3–1 (H)	Quarter-finals	(Panama) Chorrillo	2–0	1–0 (A)	1–0 (H)
(Panama) Plaza Amador	8–2	7–1 (A)	1–1 (H)	Semi-finals	(Panama) Árabe Unido	1–0	0–0 (A)	1–0 (H)

== Format ==
The final was played on a home-and-away two-legged basis, with the team with the better performance in previous rounds hosting the second leg.

If the aggregate score was tied after the second leg, the away goals rule would be applied, and if still tied, a penalty shoot-out would be used to determine the winner.

=== Performance ranking ===
Pos	Team	Pld	W	D	L	GF	GA	GD	Pts	Host
1	(Costa Rica) Santos de Guápiles	6	5	1	0	11	3	+8	16	2nd leg
2	(Honduras) Olimpia	6	4	1	1	14	4	+10	13	1st leg

Source: CONCACAF
Rules for classification: 1) Points; 2) Goal difference; 3) Goals scored; 4) Away goals scored; 5) Wins; 6) Away wins; 7) Drawing of lots.

== Matches ==
=== First leg ===
19 October 2017
20:00 UTC−6

Olimpia (Honduras)	0–1	(Costa Rica) Santos de Guápiles
	Report	Azofeifa 62'

Estadio Olímpico Metropolitano, San Pedro Sula
Attendance: 0
Referee: Ismail Elfath (United States)

Olimpia	Santos de Guápiles

GK	28	(Honduras) Donis Escober
RB	19	(Honduras) José Tobías	(yellow card) 65'
CB	30	(Honduras) Johnny Palacios
CB	35	(Colombia) Andrés Quejada
LB	5	(Honduras) Éver Alvarado		(substituted off) 84'
DM	23	(Honduras) Brayan Moya
CM	8	(Honduras) Luis Garrido		(substituted off) 65'
CM	20	(Honduras) Alexander López
CM	33	(Honduras) Michaell Chirinos
CF	13	(Honduras) Carlo Costly (c)
CF	21	(Honduras) Roger Rojas		(substituted off) 71'
Substitutes:
GK	1	(Honduras) Edrick Menjívar
DF	2	(Honduras) Kevin Álvarez
DF	17	(Honduras) Jonathan Paz
MF	7	(Honduras) Carlos Will Mejía	(yellow card) 90+2'	(substituted on) 71'
MF	16	(Honduras) Gerson Rodas		(substituted on) 65'
MF	29	(Honduras) German Mejía
FW	18	(Colombia) Javier Estupiñán		(substituted on) 84'
Manager:
(Colombia) Carlos Restrepo

GK	1	(Costa Rica) Bryan Morales
CB	15	(Costa Rica) Juan Diego Madrigal
CB	28	(Costa Rica) José Garro
CB	8	(Costa Rica) Edder Monguío (c)
RWB	4	(Costa Rica) Ian Smith
LWB	17	(Costa Rica) Marvin Obando	(yellow card) 35'
CM	12	(Costa Rica) Youstin Salas
CM	20	(Costa Rica) Wílmer Azofeifa
RF	71	(Costa Rica) Osvaldo Rodríguez		(substituted off) 82'
CF	27	(Costa Rica) Edder Solórzano		(substituted off) 78'
LF	24	(Costa Rica) Kenneth Dixon	(yellow card) 20'	(substituted off) 67'
Substitutes:
GK	21	(Costa Rica) Alejandro Gómez
DF	2	(Costa Rica) Michael Barquero		(substituted on) 78'
DF	19	(Costa Rica) Alexis Gamboa
DF	29	(Costa Rica) Rigoberto Jiménez
MF	23	(Costa Rica) Diego Díaz
FW	11	(Costa Rica) Reimond Salas		(substituted on) 82'
FW	26	(Costa Rica) Leonardo Adams		(substituted on) 67'
Manager:
(Costa Rica) Johnny Cháves

Assistant referees:
Corey Parker (United States)
Ian Anderson (United States)
Fourth official:
Baldomero Toledo (United States)

Match rules

- 90 minutes.
- Seven named substitutes, of which up to three may be used.

=== Second leg ===
26 October 2017
20:00 UTC−6

Santos de Guápiles (Costa Rica)	0–1	(Honduras) Olimpia
	Report	Chirinos 21'
Penalties
Azofeifa (penalty missed); Lagos (penalty scored); Barquero (penalty missed)	1–4	(penalty scored) Costly; (penalty scored) Moya; (penalty scored) López; (penalty scored) C. Mejía

Estadio Nacional de Costa Rica, San José
Attendance: 10,460
Referee: Luis Enrique Santander (Mexico)

Santos de Guápiles	Olimpia

GK	1	(Costa Rica) Bryan Morales	(yellow card) PSO 3'
CB	15	(Costa Rica) Juan Diego Madrigal
CB	28	(Costa Rica) José Garro
CB	8	(Costa Rica) Edder Monguío (c)
RWB	4	(Costa Rica) Ian Smith
LWB	2	(Costa Rica) Michael Barquero
CM	71	(Costa Rica) Osvaldo Rodríguez		(substituted off) 86'
CM	20	(Costa Rica) Wílmer Azofeifa	(yellow card) 44'
RF	7	(Costa Rica) Kenny Cunningham	(yellow card) 34'	(substituted off) 68'
CF	88	(Costa Rica) Starling Matarrita		(substituted off) 78'
LF	11	(Costa Rica) Reimond Salas
Substitutes:
GK	21	(Costa Rica) Alejandro Gómez
DF	3	(Costa Rica) Pablo Arboine
MF	12	(Costa Rica) Youstin Salas		(substituted on) 86'
MF	23	(Costa Rica) Diego Díaz
MF	27	(Costa Rica) Edder Solórzano		(substituted on) 78'
FW	9	(Costa Rica) Cristhian Lagos		(substituted on) 68'
FW	26	(Costa Rica) Leonardo Adams
Manager:
(Costa Rica) Johnny Cháves

GK	28	(Honduras) Donis Escober
RB	2	(Honduras) Kevin Álvarez
CB	30	(Honduras) Johnny Palacios
CB	35	(Colombia) Andrés Quejada		(substituted off) 18'
LB	5	(Honduras) Éver Alvarado
DM	23	(Honduras) Brayan Moya
CM	29	(Honduras) German Mejía	(yellow card) 30'
CM	20	(Honduras) Alexander López
CM	33	(Honduras) Michaell Chirinos		(substituted off) 60'
CF	13	(Honduras) Carlo Costly (c)
CF	21	(Honduras) Roger Rojas		(substituted off) 90'
Substitutes:
GK	1	(Honduras) Edrick Menjívar
DF	17	(Honduras) Jonathan Paz		(substituted on) 18'
MF	7	(Honduras) Carlos Will Mejía		(substituted on) 90'
MF	8	(Honduras) Luis Garrido	(yellow card) 79'	(substituted on) 60'
MF	16	(Honduras) Gerson Rodas
MF	46	(Honduras) José Reyes
FW	25	(Honduras) Jorge Benguché
Manager:
(Colombia) Carlos Restrepo

Assistant referees:
Pablo Hernández (Mexico)
Andrés Hernández (Mexico)
Fourth official:
Óscar Macías (Mexico)

Match rules

- 90 minutes.
- Penalty shoot-out if tied on aggregate and away goals.
- Seven named substitutes, of which up to three may be used.

== See also ==
- 2018 CONCACAF Champions League
