= 2017 CONCACAF League =

2017 Scotiabank CONCACAF League

Tournament details
- Dates: 1 August – 26 October
- Teams: 16 (from 8 associations)

Final positions
- Champions: (Honduras) Olimpia (1st title)
- Runners-up: (Costa Rica) Santos de Guápiles

Tournament statistics
- Matches played: 30
- Goals scored: 64 (2.13 per match)
- Top scorer: (Honduras) Roger Rojas (5 goals)
- Best player: (Honduras) Michaell Chirinos
- Best young player: (Honduras) Kevin Álvarez
- Best goalkeeper: (Costa Rica) Bryan Morales
- Fair play award: (Costa Rica) Santos de Guápiles

The 2017 CONCACAF League (officially the 2017 Scotiabank CONCACAF League for sponsorship purposes) was the inaugural edition of the CONCACAF League, a football club competition organized by CONCACAF, the regional governing body of North America, Central America, and the Caribbean.

The tournament was created as part of a new CONCACAF club competition platform consisting of two tournaments (CONCACAF League and CONCACAF Champions League) and a total of 31 teams competing during the season (an increase from the previous 24 teams), with 16 teams competing in the CONCACAF League from August to October, and the winner of the CONCACAF League joining the 15 direct entrants competing in the CONCACAF Champions League from February to April. Details of the inaugural edition of the CONCACAF League was confirmed on 8 May 2017.

Olimpia defeated Santos de Guápiles in the final, and qualified for the 2018 CONCACAF Champions League.

== Qualification ==
A total of 16 teams participate in the CONCACAF League:

- Central American Zone: 13 teams (from six associations; ordinarily from seven associations, but Guatemalan teams were excluded from this season's tournament)
- Caribbean Zone: 3 teams (from two or three associations)

Therefore, teams from either 8 or 9 out of the 41 CONCACAF member associations may participate in the CONCACAF League.

=== Central America ===
The 13 berths for the Central American Football Union (UNCAF) are allocated to the seven UNCAF member associations as follows: two berths for each of Costa Rica, El Salvador, Guatemala, Honduras, Panama, and Nicaragua, and one berth for Belize.

All of the leagues of Central America employ a split season with two tournaments in one season, so the following teams qualify for the CONCACAF League:

- In the league of Costa Rica, the champions with the worse aggregate record, and the non-champions with the best aggregate record, qualify. If there is any team which are champions of both tournaments, the non-champions with the second best aggregate record qualify.
- In the leagues of El Salvador, Guatemala, Honduras, and Panama, the champions with the worse aggregate record, and the runners-up with the better aggregate record (or any team which are runners-up of both tournaments), qualify. If there is any team which are finalists of both tournaments, the runners-up with the worse aggregate record qualify. If there are any two teams which are finalists of both tournaments, the semi-finalists with the best aggregate record qualify.
- In the league of Nicaragua, both champions qualify. If there is any team which are champions of both tournaments, the runners-up with the better aggregate record (or any team which are runners-up of both tournaments) qualify.
- In the league of Belize, the champions with the better aggregate record (or any team which are champions of both tournaments) qualify.

If teams from any Central American associations are excluded, they are replaced by teams from other Central American associations, with the associations chosen based on results from previous CONCACAF Champions League tournaments. For this season, the two teams from Guatemala were excluded due to the suspension of their federation by FIFA and were replaced by an additional team each from Panama and Honduras.

=== Caribbean ===
The three berths for the Caribbean Football Union (CFU) are allocated via the Caribbean Club Championship, a subcontinental tournament open to the clubs of all 31 CFU member associations. To qualify for the Caribbean Club Championship, teams have to finish as the champions or runners-up of their respective association's league in the previous season, but professional teams may also be selected by their associations if they play in the league of another country.

The runners-up, third-placed and fourth-placed teams of the Caribbean Club Championship qualify for the CONCACAF League.

== Teams ==
The following 16 teams (from eight associations) qualified for the tournament.

Qualified teams from Central America (13 teams)
Association	Team	Qualifying method
(Costa Rica) Costa Rica (2 berths)	Alajuelense	Non-champions with best aggregate record in 2016–17 season
(Costa Rica) Costa Rica (2 berths)	Santos de Guápiles	Non-champions with 2nd best aggregate record in 2016–17 season
Honduras (2 + 1 berths)	Honduras Progreso	Runners-up with better aggregate record in 2016–17 season (2017 Clausura)
Honduras (2 + 1 berths)	Platense	Runners-up with worse aggregate record in 2016–17 season (2016 Apertura)
Honduras (2 + 1 berths)	Olimpia	Semi-finalists with best aggregate record in 2016–17 season (2016 Apertura and 2017 Clausura)
Panama (2 + 1 berths)	Árabe Unido	Champions with worse aggregate record in 2016–17 season (2016 Apertura)
Panama (2 + 1 berths)	Plaza Amador	2016 Apertura runners-up
Panama (2 + 1 berths)	Chorrillo	Semi-finalists with best aggregate record in 2016–17 season (2016 Apertura)
(El Salvador) El Salvador (2 berths)	Alianza	2016 Apertura and 2017 Clausura runners-up
(El Salvador) El Salvador (2 berths)	Águila	Semi-finalists with best aggregate record in 2016–17 season (2016 Apertura and 2017 Clausura)
Nicaragua (2 berths)	Real Estelí	2016 Apertura and 2017 Clausura champions
Nicaragua (2 berths)	Walter Ferretti	2016 Apertura and 2017 Clausura runners-up
Belize (1 berth)	Belmopan Bandits	2016 Opening and 2017 Closing champions

Qualified teams from Caribbean (3 teams)
Association	Team	Qualifying method
(Trinidad and Tobago) Trinidad and Tobago	San Juan Jabloteh	2017 Caribbean Club Championship runners-up
Jamaica	Portmore United	2017 Caribbean Club Championship third place
(Trinidad and Tobago) Trinidad and Tobago	Central	2017 Caribbean Club Championship fourth place

Notes

1. Costa Rica (CRC): The "wild card" berth reallocated from Guatemala to Costa Rica passed to the non-champions with the second best aggregate record, Santos de Guápiles.
2. Guatemala (GUA): On 28 October 2016, FIFA suspended the National Football Federation of Guatemala for political interference by the Government of Guatemala. Until the suspension is lifted, Guatemalan teams are not permitted to participate in international competitions. CONCACAF set the deadline of 1 May 2017 for the suspension to be lifted in order for Guatemala's teams to participate in this season's tournaments, and expelled all Guatemalan teams on 5 May 2017 after the federation failed to be reinstated by FIFA. The two Guatemalan teams which would have qualified for the CONCACAF League were:
  - Antigua GFC, champions with worse aggregate record in 2016–17 season (2016 Apertura champions)
  - Guastatoya, 2017 Clausura runners-up
  Moreover, Municipal (2017 Clausura champions and 2016 Apertura runners-up) would have qualified for the CONCACAF Champions League as champions with better aggregate record in 2016–17 season, and Herediano, which would have qualified for the first Costa Rican berth in the CONCACAF League, were moved from the CONCACAF League to the CONCACAF Champions League to replace them. As a result, the three vacated berths were replaced by teams from Costa Rica (Santos de Guápiles), Honduras (Olimpia), and Panama (Chorrillo), all entering the CONCACAF League as "wild card" teams, based on the performance of the Central American associations in the last five years, giving Honduras and Panama three berths each.
3. Honduras (HON): The "wild card" berth reallocated from Guatemala to Honduras passed to the semi-finalists with the best aggregate record, Olimpia.
4. Panama (PAN): The "wild card" berth reallocated from Guatemala to Panama passed to the semi-finalists with the best aggregate record, Chorrillo.

== Draw ==
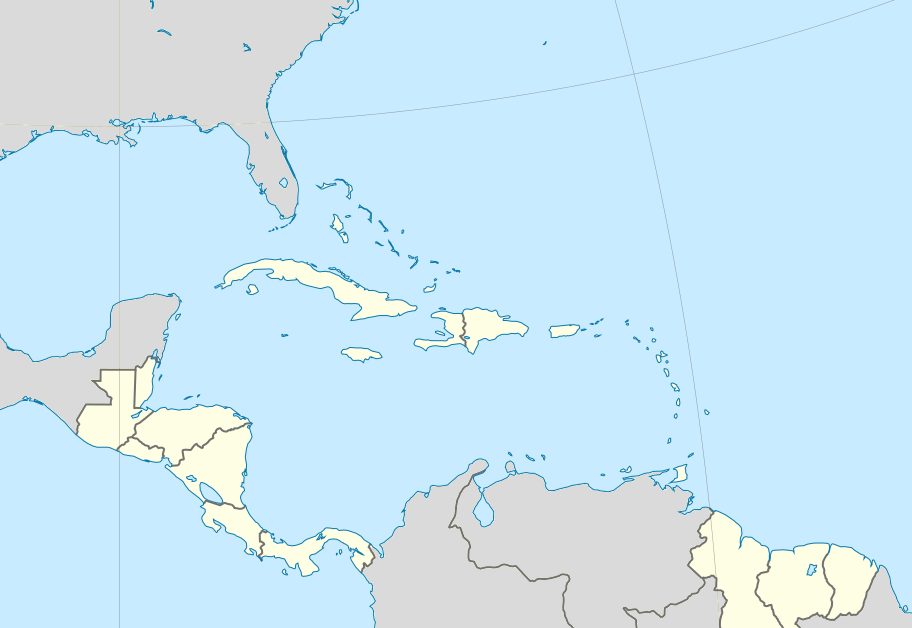
Location of teams of the 2017 CONCACAF League
Central American Zone Caribbean Zone

The draw for the 2017 CONCACAF League was held on 31 May 2017, 19:00 EDT (UTC−4), at the Hilton Miami Airport Hotel in Miami, Florida, United States, and was streamed on YouTube.

The draw determined each tie in the round of 16 (numbered 1 through 8) between a team from Pot 1 and a team from Pot 2, each containing eight teams. The "Bracket Position Pots" (Pot A and Pot B) contained the bracket positions numbered 1 through 8 corresponding to each tie. The teams from Pot 1 were assigned a bracket position from Pot A and the teams from Pot 2 were assigned a bracket position from Pot B. Teams from the same association could not be drawn against each other in the round of 16 except for "wildcard" teams which replaced a team from another association.

The 16 teams were distributed in the pots as follows:

Pot	Slot	Team
Pot 1	CRC3	(Costa Rica) Alajuelense
Pot 1	PAN2	(Panama) Árabe Unido
Pot 1	PAN3	(Panama) Plaza Amador
Pot 1	HON2	Honduras Progreso
Pot 1	SLV2	(El Salvador) Alianza
Pot 1	NCA1	(Nicaragua) Real Estelí
Pot 1	BLZ1	(Belize) Belmopan Bandits
Pot 1	CFU2	(Trinidad and Tobago) San Juan Jabloteh
Pot 2	CRC4	(Costa Rica) Santos de Guápiles (wildcard)
Pot 2	PAN4	(Panama) Chorrillo (wildcard)
Pot 2	HON3	(Honduras) Platense
Pot 2	HON4	(Honduras) Olimpia (wildcard)
Pot 2	SLV3	(El Salvador) Águila
Pot 2	NCA2	(Nicaragua) Walter Ferretti
Pot 2	CFU3	(Jamaica) Portmore United
Pot 2	CFU4	(Trinidad and Tobago) Central

== Format ==
In the CONCACAF League, the 16 teams played a single-elimination tournament. Each tie was played on a home-and-away two-legged basis. If the aggregate score was tied after the second leg, the away goals rule would be applied, and if still tied, the penalty shoot-out would be used to determine the winner (Regulations, II. D. Tie-Breaker Procedures).

== Schedule ==
The schedule of the competition was as follows.

	First leg	Second leg
Round of 16	1–3 August 2017	8–10 August 2017
Quarter-finals	15–17 August 2017	22–24 August 2017
Semi-finals	13–14 September 2017	21 September 2017
Final	19 October 2017	26 October 2017

All times were Eastern Daylight Time, i.e., UTC−4 (local times were in parentheses).

== Bracket ==
Round of 16
(Costa Rica) Santos de Guápiles	6	2	8
(Trinidad and Tobago) San Juan Jabloteh	2	1	3
(Panama) Chorrillo	1	1	2
Honduras Progreso	0	0	0
(Trinidad and Tobago) Central	1	0	1
(Panama) Árabe Unido	2	3	5
(El Salvador) Águila (p)	1	0	1 (4)
(Nicaragua) Real Estelí	0	1	1 (3)
(Honduras) Olimpia	2	1	3
(Costa Rica) Alajuelense	0	0	0
(Honduras) Platense	1	1	2
(El Salvador) Alianza	2	2	4
(Jamaica) Portmore United	1	0	1 (4)
(Panama) Plaza Amador (p)	0	1	1 (5)
(Nicaragua) Walter Ferretti	4	1	5
(Belize) Belmopan Bandits	1	0	1

Quarter-finals
(Panama) Chorrillo	0	0	0
(Costa Rica) Santos de Guápiles	1	1	2
(El Salvador) Águila	0	1	1
(Panama) Árabe Unido	2	0	2
(El Salvador) Alianza	1	1	2
(Honduras) Olimpia	0	3	3
(Nicaragua) Walter Ferretti	0	1	1
(Panama) Plaza Amador	0	2	2

Semi-finals
(Panama) Árabe Unido	0	0	0
(Costa Rica) Santos de Guápiles	0	1	1
(Panama) Plaza Amador	1	1	2
(Honduras) Olimpia	7	1	8

Final
(Honduras) Olimpia (p)	0	1	1 (4)
(Costa Rica) Santos de Guápiles	1	0	1 (1)

== Round of 16 ==
In the round of 16, the matchups were decided by draw: R16-1 through R16-8. The teams from Pot 1 in the draw hosted the second leg.

=== Summary ===
The first legs were played on 1–3 August, and the second legs were played on 8–10 August 2017.

Team 1	Agg.	Team 2	1st leg	2nd leg
Santos de Guápiles (Costa Rica)	8–3	(Trinidad and Tobago) San Juan Jabloteh	6–2	2–1
Chorrillo (Panama)	2–0	Honduras Progreso	1–0	1–0
Central (Trinidad and Tobago)	1–5	(Panama) Árabe Unido	1–2	0–3
Águila (El Salvador)	1–1 (4–3 p)	(Nicaragua) Real Estelí	1–0	0–1
Olimpia (Honduras)	3–0	(Costa Rica) Alajuelense	2–0	1–0
Platense (Honduras)	2–4	(El Salvador) Alianza	1–2	1–2
Portmore United (Jamaica)	1–1 (4–5 p)	(Panama) Plaza Amador	1–0	0–1
Walter Ferretti (Nicaragua)	5–1	(Belize) Belmopan Bandits	4–1	1–0

=== Matches ===
1 August 2017
22:00 (20:00 UTC−6)

Santos de Guápiles (Costa Rica)	6–2	(Trinidad and Tobago) San Juan Jabloteh
Cunningham 4' (pen.); Matarrita 31'; Salas 39'; Monguio 58'; Rodríguez 72'; Madrigal 78' (pen.)	Report	Simpson 50'; Lewis 89'

Estadio Ricardo Saprissa Aymá, San José
Referee: Armando Castro (Honduras)
8 August 2017
20:00 (20:00 UTC−4)

San Juan Jabloteh (Trinidad and Tobago)	1–2	(Costa Rica) Santos de Guápiles
Reid 3' (pen.)	Report	Garro 33'; Solórzano 72'

Hasely Crawford Stadium, Port of Spain
Referee: Gladwyn Johnson (Guyana)

Santos de Guápiles won 8–3 on aggregate.

1 August 2017
20:00 (19:00 UTC−5)

Chorrillo (Panama)	1–0	Honduras Progreso
Sierra 47'	Report

Estadio Rommel Fernández, Panama City
Referee: David Gantar (Canada)
9 August 2017
22:00 (20:00 UTC−6)

Honduras Progreso	0–1	(Panama) Chorrillo
	Report	Stephens 61'

Estadio Francisco Morazán, San Pedro Sula
Referee: Kimbell Ward (Saint Kitts and Nevis)

Chorrillo won 2–0 on aggregate.

3 August 2017
20:00 (20:00 UTC−4)

Central (Trinidad and Tobago)	1–2	(Panama) Árabe Unido
Peltier 20'	Report	C. Small 39'; E. Small 62'

Hasely Crawford Stadium, Port of Spain
Referee: Saíd Martínez (Honduras)
10 August 2017
20:00 (19:00 UTC−5)

Árabe Unido (Panama)	3–0	(Trinidad and Tobago) Central
Addles 3', 23'; C. Small 69'	Report

Estadio Rommel Fernández, Panama City
Referee: Erick Miranda (Mexico)

Árabe Unido won 5–1 on aggregate.

2 August 2017
20:00 (18:00 UTC−6)

Águila (El Salvador)	1–0	(Nicaragua) Real Estelí
García 89'	Report

Estadio Cuscatlán, San Salvador
Referee: Daneon Parchment (Jamaica)
8 August 2017
20:00 (18:00 UTC−6)

Real Estelí (Nicaragua)	1–0	(El Salvador) Águila
Peralta 85'	Report
Penalties
Acosta (penalty scored); Copete (penalty scored); Chavarría (penalty missed); Mejía (penalty scored); Torres (penalty missed)	3–4	(penalty scored) Cabezas; (penalty scored) Flores; (penalty scored) Sánchez; (penalty scored) García

Estadio Independencia, Estelí
Referee: Bryan López (Guatemala)

1–1 on aggregate. Águila won 4–3 on penalties.

3 August 2017
20:00 (18:00 UTC−6)

Olimpia (Honduras)	2–0	(Costa Rica) Alajuelense
Costly 3'; Álvarez 25'	Report

Estadio Tiburcio Carías Andino, Tegucigalpa
Referee: Mario Escobar (Guatemala)
10 August 2017
22:00 (20:00 UTC−6)

Alajuelense (Costa Rica)	0–1	(Honduras) Olimpia
	Report	Rojas 45+2'

Estadio Nacional de Costa Rica, San José
Referee: Ismail Elfath (United States)

Olimpia won 3–0 on aggregate.

2 August 2017
22:00 (20:00 UTC−6)

Platense (Honduras)	1–2	(El Salvador) Alianza
Hay 85'	Report	Zelaya 72'; Portillo 88'

Estadio Excélsior, Puerto Cortés
Referee: José Kellys (Panama)
8 August 2017
22:00 (20:00 UTC−6)

Alianza (El Salvador)	2–1	(Honduras) Platense
Zelaya 15'; Larín 31'	Report	Marroquín 27' (o.g.)

Estadio Cuscatlán, San Salvador
Referee: Luis Enrique Santander (Mexico)

Alianza won 4–2 on aggregate.

2 August 2017
20:00 (19:00 UTC−5)

Portmore United (Jamaica)	1–0	(Panama) Plaza Amador
Lynch 73'	Report

National Stadium, Kingston
Referee: Armando Villarreal (United States)
9 August 2017
20:00 (19:00 UTC−5)

Plaza Amador (Panama)	1–0	(Jamaica) Portmore United
Pimentel 75'	Report
Penalties
Sinclair (penalty scored); Murillo (penalty scored); Dixon (penalty scored); Pimentel (penalty scored); Hughes (penalty scored)	5–4	(penalty missed) Grandison; (penalty scored) Binns; (penalty scored) Williams; (penalty scored) Dyce; (penalty scored) Morris

Estadio Rommel Fernández, Panama City
Referee: Juan Gabriel Calderón (Costa Rica)

1–1 on aggregate. Plaza Amador won 5–4 on penalties.

3 August 2017
22:00 (20:00 UTC−6)

Walter Ferretti (Nicaragua)	4–1	(Belize) Belmopan Bandits
Méndez 12'; Laureiro 75', 90+2'; Anderson 90' (o.g.)	Report	Welcome 79' (pen.)

Estadio Independencia, Estelí
Referee: Michel Rodríguez (Cuba)
10 August 2017
22:00 (20:00 UTC−6)

Belmopan Bandits (Belize)	0–1	(Nicaragua) Walter Ferretti
	Report	Robinson 12'

Isidoro Beaton Stadium, Belmopan
Referee: Ameth Sánchez (Panama)

Walter Ferretti won 5–1 on aggregate.

== Quarter-finals ==
In the quarter-finals, the matchups were determined as follows:

- QF1: Winner R16-1 vs. Winner R16-2
- QF2: Winner R16-3 vs. Winner R16-4
- QF3: Winner R16-5 vs. Winner R16-6
- QF4: Winner R16-7 vs. Winner R16-8

The winners of round of 16 matchups 1, 3, 5, 7 hosted the second leg.

=== Summary ===
The first legs were played on 15–17 August, and the second legs were played on 22–24 August 2017.

Team 1	Agg.	Team 2	1st leg	2nd leg
Chorrillo (Panama)	0–2	(Costa Rica) Santos de Guápiles	0–1	0–1
Águila (El Salvador)	1–2	(Panama) Árabe Unido	0–2	1–0
Alianza (El Salvador)	2–3	(Honduras) Olimpia	1–0	1–3
Walter Ferretti (Nicaragua)	1–2	(Panama) Plaza Amador	0–0	1–2

=== Matches ===
15 August 2017
22:00 (21:00 UTC−5)

Chorrillo (Panama)	0–1	(Costa Rica) Santos de Guápiles
	Report	Rodríguez 40'

Estadio Rommel Fernández, Panama City
Referee: Kevin Morrison (Jamaica)
22 August 2017
22:00 (20:00 UTC−6)

Santos de Guápiles (Costa Rica)	1–0	(Panama) Chorrillo
Matarrita 18'	Report

Estadio Nacional de Costa Rica, San José
Referee: Yadel Martínez (Cuba)

Santos de Guápiles won 2–0 on aggregate.

16 August 2017
22:00 (20:00 UTC−6)

Águila (El Salvador)	0–2	(Panama) Árabe Unido
	Report	C. Small 47', 81'

Estadio Cuscatlán, San Salvador
Referee: Sherwin Moore (Guyana)
23 August 2017
22:00 (21:00 UTC−5)

Árabe Unido (Panama)	0–1	(El Salvador) Águila
	Report	Lezcano 10'

Estadio Rommel Fernández, Panama City
Referee: Héctor Rodríguez (Honduras)

Árabe Unido won 2–1 on aggregate.

17 August 2017
22:00 (20:00 UTC−6)

Alianza (El Salvador)	1–0	(Honduras) Olimpia
Zelaya 51'	Report

Estadio Cuscatlán, San Salvador
Referee: Wilson Da Costa (Bahamas)
24 August 2017
22:00 (20:00 UTC−6)

Olimpia (Honduras)	3–1	(El Salvador) Alianza
Rojas 2'; Costly 55', 90+5'	Report	Guerreño 45'

Estadio Tiburcio Carías Andino, Tegucigalpa
Referee: Luis Enrique Santander (Mexico)

Olimpia won 3–2 on aggregate.

17 August 2017
20:00 (18:00 UTC−6)

Walter Ferretti (Nicaragua)	0–0	(Panama) Plaza Amador
	Report

Estadio Independencia, Estelí
Referee: Raúl Castro (Honduras)
24 August 2017
20:00 (19:00 UTC−5)

Plaza Amador (Panama)	2–1	(Nicaragua) Walter Ferretti
Murillo 1'; Sinclair 55'	Report	Laureiro 40' (pen.)

Estadio Rommel Fernández, Panama City
Referee: Juan Guerra (Guatemala)

Plaza Amador won 2–1 on aggregate.

== Semi-finals ==
In the semi-finals, the matchups were determined as follows:

- SF1: Winner QF1 vs. Winner QF2
- SF2: Winner QF3 vs. Winner QF4

The semi-finalists in each tie which had the better performance in previous rounds hosted the second leg.

Pos	Team	Pld	W	D	L	GF	GA	GD	Pts	Host
1 (SF1)	(Costa Rica) Santos de Guápiles	4	4	0	0	10	3	+7	12	2nd leg
2 (SF1)	(Panama) Árabe Unido	4	3	0	1	7	2	+5	9	1st leg
1 (SF2)	(Honduras) Olimpia	4	3	0	1	6	2	+4	9	2nd leg
2 (SF2)	(Panama) Plaza Amador	4	2	1	1	3	2	+1	7	1st leg

Source: CONCACAF
Rules for classification: 1) Points; 2) Goal difference; 3) Goals scored; 4) Away goals scored; 5) Wins; 6) Away wins; 7) Drawing of lots.

=== Summary ===
The first legs were played on 13–14 September, and the second legs were played on 21 September 2017.

Team 1	Agg.	Team 2	1st leg	2nd leg
Árabe Unido (Panama)	0–1	(Costa Rica) Santos de Guápiles	0–0	0–1
Plaza Amador (Panama)	2–8	(Honduras) Olimpia	1–7	1–1

=== Matches ===
13 September 2017
22:00 (21:00 UTC−5)

Árabe Unido (Panama)	0–0	(Costa Rica) Santos de Guápiles
	Report

Estadio Rommel Fernández, Panama City
Referee: Walter López (Guatemala)
21 September 2017
22:00 (20:00 UTC−6)

Santos de Guápiles (Costa Rica)	1–0	(Panama) Árabe Unido
Cunningham 86'	Report

Estadio Nacional de Costa Rica, San José
Referee: Mario Escobar (Guatemala)

Santos de Guápiles won 1–0 on aggregate.

14 September 2017
22:00 (21:00 UTC−5)

Plaza Amador (Panama)	1–7	(Honduras) Olimpia
Zorrilla 39'	Report	Costly 12'; López 22'; Rojas 28', 65'; Chirinos 61', 68'; Canales 81'

Estadio Rommel Fernández, Panama City
Referee: Armando Villarreal (United States)
21 September 2017
20:00 (18:00 UTC−6)

Olimpia (Honduras)	1–1	(Panama) Plaza Amador
Rojas 81'	Report	Murillo 20'

Estadio Olímpico Metropolitano, San Pedro Sula
Referee: Joel Aguilar (El Salvador)

Olimpia won 8–2 on aggregate.

== Final ==
In the final (Winner SF1 vs. Winner SF2), the finalists which had the better performance in previous rounds hosted the second leg.

Pos	Team	Pld	W	D	L	GF	GA	GD	Pts	Host
1	(Costa Rica) Santos de Guápiles	6	5	1	0	11	3	+8	16	2nd leg
2	(Honduras) Olimpia	6	4	1	1	14	4	+10	13	1st leg

Source: CONCACAF
Rules for classification: 1) Points; 2) Goal difference; 3) Goals scored; 4) Away goals scored; 5) Wins; 6) Away wins; 7) Drawing of lots.

=== Summary ===
The first leg was played on 19 October, and the second leg was played on 26 October 2017.

Team 1	Agg.	Team 2	1st leg	2nd leg
Olimpia (Honduras)	1–1 (4–1 p)	(Costa Rica) Santos de Guápiles	0–1	1–0

=== Matches ===
19 October 2017
22:00 (20:00 UTC−6)

Olimpia (Honduras)	0–1	(Costa Rica) Santos de Guápiles
	Report	Azofeifa 62'

Estadio Olímpico Metropolitano, San Pedro Sula
Attendance: 0
Referee: Ismail Elfath (United States)
26 October 2017
22:00 (20:00 UTC−6)

Santos de Guápiles (Costa Rica)	0–1	(Honduras) Olimpia
	Report	Chirinos 21'
Penalties
Azofeifa (penalty missed); Lagos (penalty scored); Barquero (penalty missed)	1–4	(penalty scored) Costly; (penalty scored) Moya; (penalty scored) López; (penalty scored) C. Mejía

Estadio Nacional de Costa Rica, San José
Attendance: 10,460
Referee: Luis Enrique Santander (Mexico)

1–1 on aggregate. Olimpia won 4–1 on penalties.

== Top goalscorers ==
Team eliminated for this round.

Rank	Player	Team	Goals	By round							
Rank	Player	Team	Goals	1R1	1R2	QF1	QF2	SF1	SF2	F1	F2
1	(Honduras) Roger Rojas	(Honduras) Olimpia	5		1		1	2	1		
2	(Honduras) Carlo Costly	(Honduras) Olimpia	4	1			2	1			
2	(Panama) Carlos Small	(Panama) Árabe Unido	4	1	1	2					
4	(Honduras) Michaell Chirinos	(Honduras) Olimpia	3			2					1
4	(Uruguay) Bernardo Laureiro	(Nicaragua) Walter Ferretti	3	2			1				
4	(El Salvador) Rodolfo Zelaya	(El Salvador) Alianza	3	1	1	1					
7	(Panama) Renán Addles	(Panama) Árabe Unido	2		2						
7	(Costa Rica) Kenny Cunningham	(Costa Rica) Santos de Guápiles	2	1					1		
7	(Costa Rica) Starling Matarrita	(Costa Rica) Santos de Guápiles	2	1			1				
7	(Panama) José Murillo	(Panama) Plaza Amador	2				1		1		
7	(Costa Rica) Osvaldo Rodríguez	(Costa Rica) Santos de Guápiles	2	1		1					

Source:CONCACAF

== Awards ==
Award	Player	Team
Golden Ball	(Honduras) Michaell Chirinos	(Honduras) Olimpia
Golden Boot	(Honduras) Roger Rojas	(Honduras) Olimpia
Golden Glove	(Costa Rica) Bryan Morales	(Costa Rica) Santos de Guápiles
Best Young Player	(Honduras) Kevin Álvarez	(Honduras) Olimpia
Fair Play Award	—	(Costa Rica) Santos de Guápiles

Best XI
Position	Player	Team
GK	(Costa Rica) Bryan Morales	(Costa Rica) Santos de Guápiles
DF	(Costa Rica) Youstin Salas	(Costa Rica) Santos de Guápiles
DF	(Honduras) Kevin Álvarez	(Honduras) Olimpia
DF	(Costa Rica) Juan Diego Madrigal	(Costa Rica) Santos de Guápiles
DF	(Costa Rica) Edder Monguio	(Costa Rica) Santos de Guápiles
MF	(Honduras) Alexander López	(Honduras) Olimpia
MF	(Costa Rica) Wílmer Azofeifa	(Costa Rica) Santos de Guápiles
MF	(Honduras) Michaell Chirinos	(Honduras) Olimpia
MF	(Costa Rica) Kenny Cunningham	(Costa Rica) Santos de Guápiles
FW	(Honduras) Roger Rojas	(Honduras) Olimpia
FW	(Panama) Carlos Small	(Panama) Árabe Unido

== See also ==
- 2018 CONCACAF Champions League
