= Andrés Carevic =

Argentine footballer and manager (born 1978)

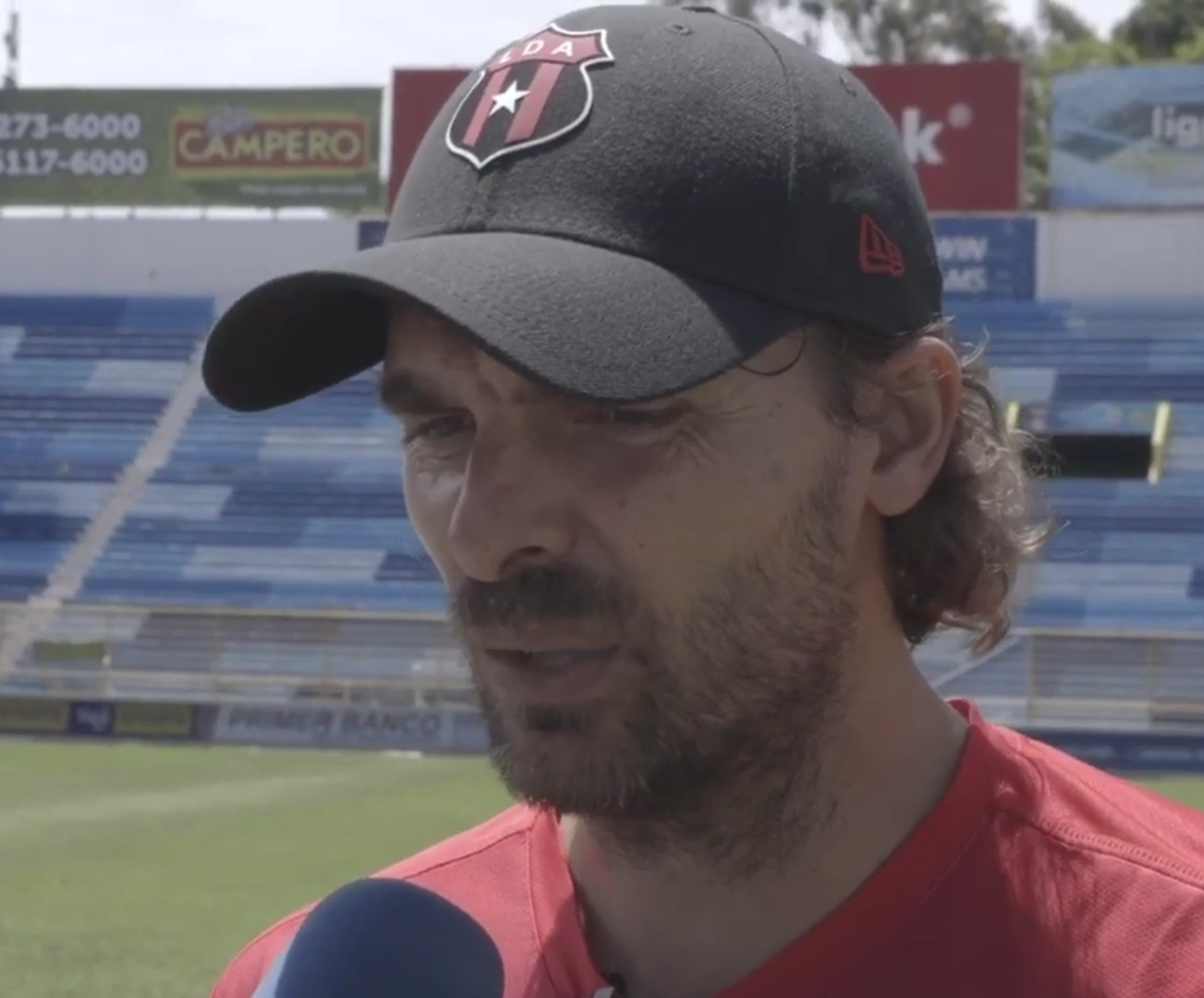
- Carevic in 2019

Personal information
- Full name: Andrés José Carevic Ghelfi
- Date of birth: 13 December 1978 (age 47)
- Place of birth: Santa Fe, Argentina
- Height: 1.83 m (6 ft 0 in)
- Position: Defender

Team information
- Current team: Cartaginés (manager)

Youth career
- 1998–1999: Boca Juniors
- 1999–2000: AZ Alkmaar

Senior career*
| Years | Team | Apps | (Gls) |
| 2000–2001 | Marte | 37 | (8) |
| 2002 | Chapulineros de Oaxaca | 12 | (1) |
| 2002–2003 | Acapulco | 39 | (6) |
| 2003 | Atlante | 12 | (0) |
| 2004–2005 | Mérida | 39 | (6) |
| 2005 | General Paz Juniors | 15 | (1) |
| 2006 | Blooming | 12 | (0) |
| 2006 | The Strongest | 10 | (0) |
| 2007 | C.A.I. | 17 | (0) |
| 2007–2011 | Atlante | 76 | (3) |
| 2011–2012 | Venados | 19 | (0) |

Managerial career
- 2012–2013: Atlante Reserves and Academy
- 2013: Atlante (Interim)
- 2013–2014: Atlante Reserves and Academy
- 2014: Alto Rendimiento Tuzo
- 2015–2016: Pachuca Reserves and Academy
- 2016–2017: Puebla (Assistant)
- 2018–2019: Mineros de Zacatecas
- 2019–2021: Alajuelense
- 2022: Venados
- 2023–2024: Alajuelense
- 2024: Puebla
- 2024: Deportivo Cuenca
- 2025: Cartaginés
- 2025–: Sporting San José
- * Club domestic league appearances and goals

Andrés José Carevic Ghelfi (Croatian: Andrija Josip Carević; born 13 December 1978) is an Argentine-Mexican professional football manager and former player who is the manager of Costa Rican club Sporting San José.

== Club career ==
Carevic played in the Primera Division A for many years with teams like Potros Marte and Acapulco F.C. In 2006, he moved to Bolivia, where he made appearances for first-division clubs Blooming and The Strongest. In 2007, he came to Atlante as the fifth foreign player (Teams in the Mexican League are only allowed five foreign players). Carevic eventually acquired Mexican nationality and has been an Atlante mainstay ever since.

As a player, Carevic had a successful career, winning the national championship with Atlante during the Apertura 2007 tournament.

== Honours ==
=== Player ===
Atlante F.C.

- Primera División de México: Apertura 2007
- CONCACAF Champions League: 2008–09

=== Manager ===
Alajuelense

- Liga FPD: 2020–21
- CONCACAF League: 2020
- CONCACAF Central American Cup: 2023
