= Barlon Sequeira =

Costa Rican football player (born 1998)

Personal information
- Full name: Barlon Andrés Sequeira Sibaja
- Date of birth: 25 May 1998 (age 28)
- Height: 1.77 m (5 ft 10 in)
- Position: Midfielder

Team information
- Current team: Municipal Pérez Zeledón
- Number: 11

Senior career*
Years	Team	Apps	(Gls)
2016–2022	Alajuelense	136	(9)
2022–2023	Sporting San José	28	(0)
2023–2024	Puntarenas	37	(0)
2024–2025	Municipal Liberia	45	(3)
2026-	Zeledon	10	(1)

International career^{‡}
2015	Costa Rica U17	4	(0)
2017	Costa Rica U20	4	(0)
2018	Costa Rica U21	3	(0)
2019–	Costa Rica	4	(0)
- * Club domestic league appearances and goals as of 26 May 2026 ‡ National team caps and goals as of 28 January 2020

Barlon Andrés Sequeira Sibaja (born 25 May 1998) is a Costa Rican professional footballer who plays for Municipal Pérez Zeledón in the Liga FPD.

== Career ==
Sequeuira made his league debut for Liga Deportiva Alajuelense on 28 August 2016 against San Carlos. In October 2020 he signed a new contract with the club of which he said he “had dreamt of playing for as a child” to take him up to 2023. Sequeira was present during Apertura 2020 when Alajuelense won the national title. However, the following season, with the arrival of Albert Rudé as the new manager, Sequeira saw fewer opportunities and a transfer to Sporting San José followed in 2022.

== International career ==
He made his debut for the Costa Rica national football team on 17 October 2018 against Colombia at the Red Bull Arena (New Jersey).

== Honours ==
Alajuelense

- Liga FPD: Apertura 2020
- CONCACAF League: 2020
