= Ian Smith (footballer, born 1998) =

Costa Rican association football player

Personal information
- Full name: Ian Rey Smith Quirós
- Date of birth: 6 March 1998 (age 28)
- Place of birth: Guápiles, Costa Rica
- Height: 1.77 m (5 ft 10 in)
- Position: Right-back

Team information
- Current team: Quepos

Youth career
- Santos de Guápiles

Senior career*
Years	Team	Apps	(Gls)
2014–2018	Santos de Guápiles	32	(0)
2016	→ Hammarby IF (loan)	0	(0)
2018–2020	Norrköping	37	(2)
2020–2022	Alajuelense	87	(0)
2023–2025	Sporting San José	68	(2)
2026	Inter de San Carlos	0	(0)
2026–	Quepos	0	(0)

International career
2021	Costa Rica U23	2	(0)
2018–2019	Costa Rica	11	(0)
- * Club domestic league appearances and goals as of 19:13, 24 December 2023 (UTC)

Ian Rey Smith Quirós (born 6 March 1998) is a Costa Rican professional footballer who plays as a right-back for Quepos and plays at the Costa Rica national team.

In May 2018, he was named in Costa Rica's 23-man squad for the 2018 World Cup in Russia.

== Career statistics ==
=== International ===
As of match played 11 October 2018

Costa Rica
Year	Apps	Goals
2018	7	0
Total	7	0

== Honours ==
Alajuelense

- Liga FPD: Apertura 2020
- CONCACAF League: 2020
