= 2020 CONCACAF League =

Association football tournament in North America

2020 Scotiabank CONCACAF League
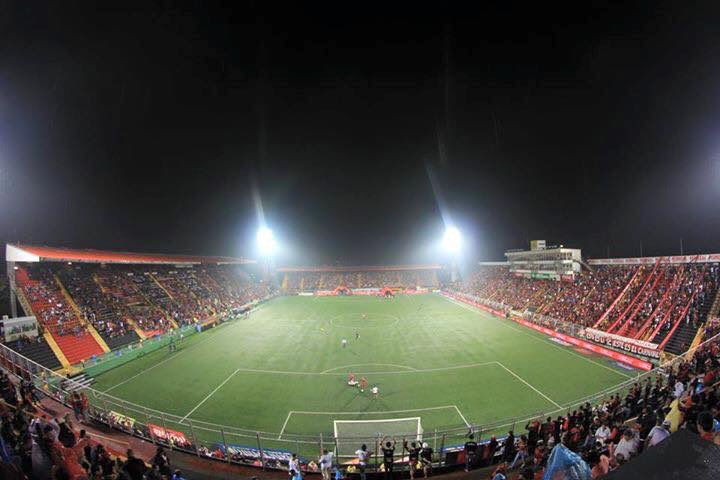
- The Alejandro Morera Soto Stadium in Alajuela hosted the final

Tournament details
- Dates: 20 October 2020 – 3 February 2021
- Teams: 22 (from 11 associations)

Final positions
- Champions: (Costa Rica) Alajuelense (1st title)
- Runners-up: (Costa Rica) Saprissa

Tournament statistics
- Matches played: 22
- Goals scored: 60 (2.73 per match)
- Attendance: 0 (0 per match)
- Top scorer(s): (Costa Rica) Johan Venegas (6 goals)
- Best player: (Honduras) Alexander López
- Best young player: (Costa Rica) Fernán Faerron
- Best goalkeeper: (Costa Rica) Leonel Moreira
- Fair play award: (Costa Rica) Alajuelense

The 2020 CONCACAF League (officially the 2020 Scotiabank CONCACAF League for sponsorship purposes) was the fourth edition of the CONCACAF League, a football club competition organized by CONCACAF, the regional governing body of North America, Central America, and the Caribbean.

Due to the COVID-19 pandemic, CONCACAF announced on 23 June 2020 that the start of the tournament, which was scheduled to begin on 28 July 2020 and end in November, had been postponed. On 7 August 2020, they announced the tournament would begin on 20 October and end on 28 January 2021. To ease the schedule, CONCACAF originally announced that the preliminary round and round of 16 would be played as single-leg matches, but on 29 October 2020, CONCACAF announced that this format had been extended to all rounds, with ties hosted by the higher-seeded teams based on the CONCACAF Club Ranking. The final was also rescheduled to 3 February 2021.

Alajuelense defeated title holders Saprissa in the final to win their first CONCACAF League title. As winners, they and the next best five teams qualified for the 2021 CONCACAF Champions League. After the format change of all rounds to single-leg matches, it was decided a play-in round would be added for the four losing quarter-finalists to compete for the last two places in the CONCACAF Champions League.

== Qualification ==
A total of 22 teams participated in the CONCACAF League:

- North American Zone: 1 team (from one association)
- Central American Zone: 18 teams (from seven associations)
- Caribbean Zone: 3 teams (from two or three associations)

Therefore, teams from either 10 or 11 out of the 41 CONCACAF member associations could participate in the CONCACAF League.

=== North America ===
The one berth for the North American Zone (NAFU) was allocated to the Canadian Soccer Association through the previous year's Canadian Premier League, where the champions, decided by the Canadian Premier League Finals, contested between the Spring and Fall season champions, qualified. They were the second Canadian representative included in CONCACAF competitions, not including the Canadian Championship winners which qualified for the CONCACAF Champions League.

=== Central America ===
The 18 berths for the Central American Football Union (UNCAF), which consisted of seven member associations, were allocated as follows: three berths for each of Costa Rica, El Salvador, Guatemala, Honduras, Panama, two berths for Nicaragua, and one berth for Belize.

All of the leagues of Central America employed a split season with two tournaments in one season, so the following teams qualified for the CONCACAF League:

- In the league of Costa Rica, both champions, and the non-champions with the best aggregate record, qualified. If there was any team which were champions of both tournaments, the non-champions with the second best aggregate record qualified.
- In the leagues of El Salvador, Guatemala, Honduras, and Panama, both champions, and the runners-up with the better aggregate record (or any team which were runners-up of both tournaments), qualified. If there was any team which were finalists of both tournaments, the runners-up with the worse aggregate record qualify. If there were any two teams which were finalists of both tournaments, the semi-finalists with the best aggregate record would qualify.
- In the league of Nicaragua, both champions qualified. If there was any team which were champions of both tournaments, the runners-up with the better aggregate record (or any team which were runners-up of both tournaments) qualified.
- In the league of Belize, the champions with the better aggregate record (or any team which were champions of both tournaments) qualified.

If teams from any Central American associations were excluded, they were to be replaced by teams from other Central American associations, with the associations chosen based on results from previous CONCACAF League and CONCACAF Champions League tournaments.

=== Caribbean ===
The three berths for the Caribbean Football Union (CFU), which consisted of 31 member associations, were allocated via the CONCACAF Caribbean Club Championship and CONCACAF Caribbean Club Shield, the first-tier and second-tier subcontinental Caribbean club tournaments. Since 2018, the CONCACAF Caribbean Club Championship had been open to teams from professional leagues, where they could qualify as champions or runners-up of their respective association's league in the previous season, while the CONCACAF Caribbean Club Shield was open to teams from non-professional leagues, where they could qualify as champions of their respective association's league in the previous season.

Besides the champions of the CONCACAF Caribbean Club Championship which qualified for the CONCACAF Champions League, the runners-up and third-placed team of the CONCACAF Caribbean Club Championship, and the winners of a playoff between the fourth-placed team of the CONCACAF Caribbean Club Championship and the champions of the CONCACAF Caribbean Club Shield, qualified for the CONCACAF League. For the champions of the CONCACAF Caribbean Club Shield to be eligible for the playoff, they had to comply with the minimum CONCACAF Club Licensing requirements for the CONCACAF League.

== Teams ==
The following 22 teams (from eleven associations) qualified for the tournament.

- Ten teams entered in the round of 16: two each from Costa Rica, Honduras, and Panama, and one each from El Salvador, Guatemala, Nicaragua, and the Caribbean.
- Twelve teams entered in the preliminary round: two each from El Salvador, Guatemala, and the Caribbean, and one each from Canada, Costa Rica, Honduras, Panama, Nicaragua, and Belize.

Due to the COVID-19 pandemic, the deadline for registration was extended to 28 June 2020.

Qualified teams from North America (1 team: entering in preliminary round)
Association	Team	Entry round	Qualifying method	App. (last)	Previous best (last)
Canada (1 PR berth)	Forge FC	Preliminary round	2019 Canadian Premier League champions	2nd (2019)	Round of 16 (2019)

Qualified teams from Central America (18 teams: 9 entering in round of 16, 9 entering in preliminary round)
Association	Team	Entry round	Qualifying method	App. (last)	Previous best (last)
Costa Rica (3 berths: 2 R16 + 1 PR)	Saprissa	Round of 16	Champions with better 2019–20 aggregate record (2020 Clausura)	2nd (2019)	Champions (2019)
Costa Rica (3 berths: 2 R16 + 1 PR)	Herediano	Round of 16	Champions with worse 2019–20 aggregate record (2019 Apertura)	3rd (2019)	Champions (2018)
Costa Rica (3 berths: 2 R16 + 1 PR)	Alajuelense	Preliminary round	Non-champions with best 2019–20 aggregate record	2nd (2017)	Round of 16 (2017)
Honduras (3 berths: 2 R16 + 1 PR)	Olimpia	Round of 16	2019 Apertura champions	3rd (2019)	Champions (2017)
Honduras (3 berths: 2 R16 + 1 PR)	Marathón	Round of 16	Non-champions with best 2019–20 aggregate record	2nd (2019)	Preliminary round (2019)
Honduras (3 berths: 2 R16 + 1 PR)	Motagua	Preliminary round	Non-champions with 2nd best 2019–20 aggregate record	3rd (2019)	Runners-up (2019)
Panama (3 berths: 2 R16 + 1 PR)	Tauro	Round of 16	2019 Apertura champions	3rd (2019)	Semi-finals (2018)
Panama (3 berths: 2 R16 + 1 PR)	San Francisco	Round of 16	Non-champions with best 2019–20 aggregate record	2nd (2019)	Preliminary round (2019)
Panama (3 berths: 2 R16 + 1 PR)	Independiente	Preliminary round	Non-champions with 2nd best 2019–20 aggregate record	2nd (2019)	Quarter-finals (2019)
El Salvador (3 berths: 1 R16 + 2 PR)	Alianza	Round of 16	2019 Apertura champions	3rd (2019)	Semi-finals (2019)
El Salvador (3 berths: 1 R16 + 2 PR)	FAS	Preliminary round	Non-champions with best 2019–20 aggregate record	2nd (2018)	Quarter-finals (2018)
El Salvador (3 berths: 1 R16 + 2 PR)	Municipal Limeño	Preliminary round	Non-champions with 2nd best 2019–20 aggregate record	1st	Debut
Guatemala (3 berths: 1 R16 + 2 PR)	Municipal	Round of 16	2019 Apertura champions	1st	Debut
Guatemala (3 berths: 1 R16 + 2 PR)	Comunicaciones	Preliminary round	Non-champions with best 2019–20 aggregate record	2nd (2019)	Quarter-finals (2019)
Guatemala (3 berths: 1 R16 + 2 PR)	Antigua GFC	Preliminary round	Non-champions with 2nd best 2019–20 aggregate record	2nd (2019)	Preliminary round (2019)
Nicaragua (2 berths: 1 R16 + 1 PR)	Real Estelí	Round of 16	2019 Apertura and 2020 Clausura champions	3rd (2019)	Round of 16 (2017)
Nicaragua (2 berths: 1 R16 + 1 PR)	Managua	Preliminary round	2019 Apertura and 2020 Clausura runners-up	2nd (2019)	Round of 16 (2019)
Belize (1 PR berth)	Verdes	Preliminary round	2019 Opening champions	1st	Debut

Qualified teams from Caribbean (3 teams: 1 entering in round of 16, 2 entering in preliminary round)
Association	Team	Entry round	Qualifying method	App. (last)	Previous best (last)
Jamaica	Waterhouse	Round of 16	2nd best ranked team of 2020 CONCACAF Caribbean Club Championship group stage	2nd (2019)	Quarter-finals (2019)
Haiti	Arcahaie	Preliminary round	3rd best ranked team of 2020 CONCACAF Caribbean Club Championship group stage	1st	Debut
Dominican Republic	Cibao	Preliminary round	4th best ranked team of 2020 CONCACAF Caribbean Club Championship group stage	1st	Debut

Notes

1. Belize (BLZ): The 2020 Closing tournament of the 2019–20 Premier League of Belize season was abandoned due to the COVID-19 pandemic in Belize, and the title was not awarded. The team that qualified to represent the Football Federation of Belize in the 2020 CONCACAF League was Verdes (entering in the preliminary round), the 2019 Opening tournament champions (also the team with the best 2019–20 aggregate record at the time of suspension).
2. Caribbean (CFU): The 2020 CONCACAF Caribbean Club Shield and the final stage of the 2020 CONCACAF Caribbean Club Championship were cancelled by CONCACAF due to the COVID-19 pandemic in the Caribbean. The three teams that qualified to represent the Caribbean Football Union in the 2020 CONCACAF League were Waterhouse from Jamaica (entering in the round of 16), Arcahaie from Haiti and Cibao from the Dominican Republic (both entering in the preliminary round), the 2nd, 3rd and 4th best ranked teams of the 2020 CONCACAF Caribbean Club Championship group stage.
3. El Salvador (SLV): The 2020 Clausura tournament of the 2019–20 Primera División de El Salvador season was abandoned due to the COVID-19 pandemic in El Salvador, and the title was not awarded. The three teams that qualified to represent the Salvadoran Football Federation in the 2020 CONCACAF League were Alianza (entering in the round of 16), the 2019 Apertura tournament champions, and FAS and Municipal Limeño (both entering in the preliminary round), the non-champions with the best and second-best 2019–20 aggregate record at the time of suspension (Once Deportivo, the 2020 Clausura regular season leaders at the time of suspension, were originally declared 2020 Clausura tournament champions, but the title and 2020 CONCACAF League berth were later retracted).
4. Guatemala (GUA): The 2020 Clausura tournament of the 2019–20 Liga Nacional de Guatemala season was abandoned due to the COVID-19 pandemic in Guatemala, and the title was not awarded. The three teams that qualified to represent the National Football Federation of Guatemala in the 2020 CONCACAF League were Municipal (entering in the round of 16), the 2019 Apertura tournament champions, and Comunicaciones and Antigua GFC (both entering in the preliminary round), the non-champions with the best and second-best 2019–20 aggregate record at the time of suspension.
5. Honduras (HON): The 2020 Clausura tournament of the 2019–20 Honduran Liga Nacional season was abandoned due to the COVID-19 pandemic in Honduras, and the title was not awarded. The three teams that qualified to represent the National Autonomous Federation of Football of Honduras in the 2020 CONCACAF League were Olimpia (entering in the round of 16), the 2019 Apertura tournament champions, and Marathón and Motagua (entering in the round of 16 and preliminary round, respectively), the non-champions with the best and second-best 2019–20 aggregate record at the time of suspension.
6. Panama (PAN): The 2020 Apertura tournament of the 2019–20 Liga Panameña de Fútbol season was abandoned due to the COVID-19 pandemic in Panama, and the title was not awarded. The three teams that qualified to represent the Panamanian Football Federation in the 2020 CONCACAF League were Tauro (entering in the round of 16), the 2019 Apertura tournament champions, and San Francisco and Independiente (entering the round of 16 and preliminary round, respectively), the non-champions with the best and second-best 2019–20 aggregate record at the time of suspension.

== Draw ==
Location of teams of the 2020 CONCACAF League
North American Zone
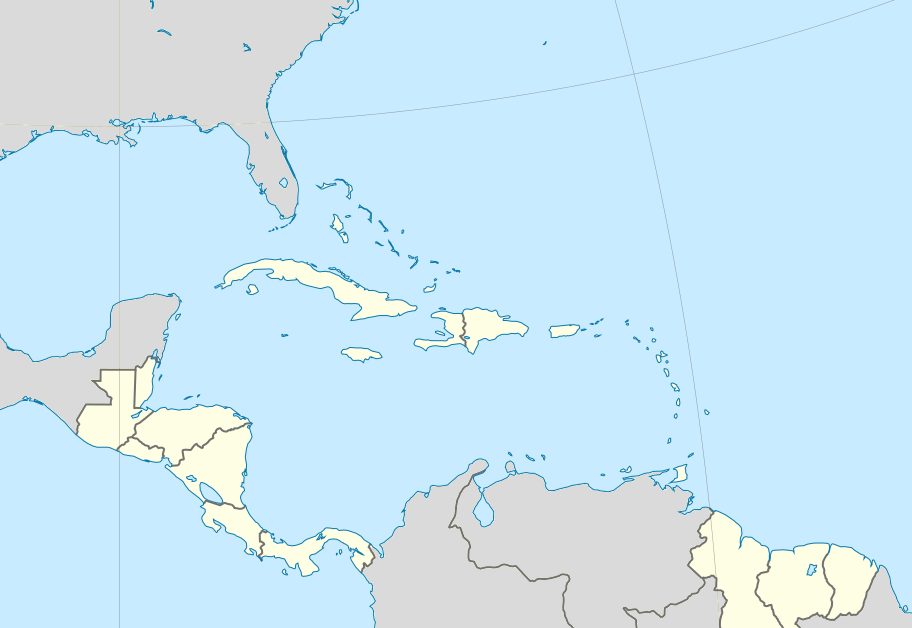
Location of teams of the 2020 CONCACAF League
Central American Zone Caribbean Zone
Teams in bold enter in the round of 16

The draw for the 2020 CONCACAF League was held on 21 September 2020, 19:00 EDT (UTC−4), at the CONCACAF headquarters in Miami, United States.

The draw determined each tie in the preliminary round (numbered 1 through 6) between a team from Pot 1 and a team from Pot 2, each containing six teams. A team from Pot 1 and a team from Pot 2 were drawn into each tie. Teams from the same association could not be drawn against each other in the preliminary round except for "wildcard" teams which could replace a team from another association.

The draw also determined each tie in the round of 16 (numbered 1 through 8) between a team from Pot 3 and a team from Pot 4, each containing eight teams, with the six preliminary round winners, whose identity was not known at the time of the draw, in Pot 4. A team from Pot 3 and a team from Pot 4 were drawn into each tie.

The seeding of teams was based on the CONCACAF Club Index. The CONCACAF Club Index, instead of ranking each team, was based on the on-field performance of the teams that had occupied the respective qualifying slots in the previous five editions of the CONCACAF League and CONCACAF Champions League. To determine the total points awarded to a slot in any single edition of the CONCACAF League or CONCACAF Champions League, CONCACAF used the following formula:

Points per	Participation	Win	Draw	Stage advanced	Champions
CONCACAF Champions League (2015–16 – 2019)	4	3	1	1	2
CONCACAF League (2017 – 2019)	2	3	1	0.5	1

Teams qualified for the CONCACAF League based on criteria set by their association (e.g., tournament champions, runners-up, cup champions), resulting in an assigned slot (e.g., CRC1, CRC2) for each team.

The 22 teams were distributed in the pots as follows:

Teams in preliminary round draw
Pot	Rank	Slot	2015–16 CCL	2016–17 CCL	2017 CL or 2018 CCL	2018 CL or 2019 CCL	2019 CL	Total	Team
Pot 1	1	CRC3	0	0	2	19.5	27	48.5	(Costa Rica) Alajuelense
Pot 1	2	SLV2	6	5	11.5	5	7.5	35	(El Salvador) FAS
Pot 1	3	SLV3	0	0	8.5	6.5	16.5	31.5	(El Salvador) Municipal Limeño
Pot 1	4	PAN3	0	0	11	15	2	28	(Panama) Independiente
Pot 1	5	HON3	0	0	2	21.5	3	26.5	(Honduras) Motagua
Pot 1	6	CCC3	5	4	5	5.5	4	23.5	(Haiti) Arcahaie
Pot 2	7	BLZ1	8	4	2	2	2	18	(Belize) Verdes
Pot 2	8	GUA2	8	6	0	0	3	17	(Guatemala) Comunicaciones
Pot 2	9	NCA2	0	0	9.5	2	5	16.5	(Nicaragua) Managua
Pot 2	10	CCC4	0	0	2	5	5.5	12.5	(Dominican Republic) Cibao
Pot 2	11	GUA3	0	0	0	0	12	12	(Guatemala) Antigua GFC
Pot 2	12	CAN2	0	0	0	0	9.5	9.5	(Canada) Forge FC

Teams in round of 16 draw
Pot	Rank	Slot	2015–16 CCL	2016–17 CCL	2017 CL or 2018 CCL	2018 CL or 2019 CCL	2019 CL	Total	Team
Pot 3	1	PAN1	10	20	8	12	5	55	(Panama) Tauro
Pot 3	2	HON1	10	11	5	4	16.5	46.5	(Honduras) Olimpia
Pot 3	3	PAN2	10	8	13	8.5	6.5	46	(Panama) San Francisco
Pot 3	4	HON2	11	11	2	3	13	40	(Honduras) Marathón
Pot 3	5	CRC1	10	8	5	7	7.5	37.5	(Costa Rica) Saprissa
Pot 3	6	CRC2	9	14	5	3	4	35	(Costa Rica) Herediano
Pot 3	7	SLV1	7	9	7	5	5	33	(El Salvador) Alianza
Pot 3	8	CCC2	7	5	2	5	5.5	24.5	(Jamaica) Waterhouse
Pot 4	9	GUA1	8	9	0	4	3	24	(Guatemala) Municipal
Pot 4	10	NCA1	4	6	5	5.5	3	23.5	(Nicaragua) Real Estelí
Pot 4	11	Winner preliminary round 1							
Pot 4	12	Winner preliminary round 2							
Pot 4	13	Winner preliminary round 3							
Pot 4	14	Winner preliminary round 4							
Pot 4	15	Winner preliminary round 5							
Pot 4	16	Winner preliminary round 6							

== Format ==
In the CONCACAF League, the 22 teams played a single-elimination tournament. Each tie was played as a single match.

- In all rounds except the final, if the score was tied after the end of regulation, a penalty shoot-out was used to determine the winner.
- In the final, extra time was played if the score was tied after regulation. If the score was still tied after extra time, a penalty shoot-out was used to determine the winner.

== Schedule ==
The schedule of the competition was as follows.

Round	Dates
Preliminary round	20–22 October 2020
Round of 16	3–5 November 2020
Quarter-finals	1–2 December 2020 (previously 1–3 and 8–10 December 2020 as two-leg matches)
Play-in round	8–9 December 2020 (previously not scheduled)
Semi-finals	20 January 2021 (previously 5–7 and 12–14 January 2021 as two-leg matches)
Final	3 February 2021 (previously 19–21 and 26–28 January 2021 as two-leg matches)

Times are Eastern Time, as listed by CONCACAF (local times are in parentheses):

- Times up to 31 October 2020 (originally scheduled preliminary round matches) are Eastern Daylight Time, i.e., UTC−4.
- Times thereafter (all other matches) are Eastern Standard Time, i.e., UTC−5.

== Bracket ==
Preliminary round
(Costa Rica) Alajuelense	3
(Dominican Republic) Cibao	0
(El Salvador) FAS	1 (4)
(Nicaragua) Managua (p)	1 (5)
(Honduras) Motagua (p)	2 (15)
(Guatemala) Comunicaciones	2 (14)
(Panama) Independiente	0 (2)
(Guatemala) Antigua GFC (p)	0 (4)
(Haiti) Arcahaie (w/o)	3
(Belize) Verdes	0
(El Salvador) Municipal Limeño	1
(Canada) Forge FC	2

Round of 16
(Costa Rica) Alajuelense	1
(Panama) San Francisco	0
(Costa Rica) Herediano	0
(Nicaragua) Real Estelí	1
(Honduras) Olimpia	6
(Nicaragua) Managua	0
(El Salvador) Alianza	1 (3)
(Honduras) Motagua (p)	1 (4)
(Honduras) Marathón (p)	1 (4)
(Guatemala) Antigua GFC	1 (3)
(Costa Rica) Saprissa	4
(Guatemala) Municipal	1
(Jamaica) Waterhouse	1
(Haiti) Arcahaie	3
(Panama) Tauro	1
(Canada) Forge FC	2

Quarter-finals
(Costa Rica) Alajuelense	2
(Nicaragua) Real Estelí	1
(Honduras) Olimpia	2
(Honduras) Motagua	0
(Honduras) Marathón	0
(Costa Rica) Saprissa	2
(Haiti) Arcahaie (p)	1 (4)
(Canada) Forge FC	1 (2)

Semi-finals
(Costa Rica) Alajuelense (p)	0 (5)
(Honduras) Olimpia	0 (4)
(Costa Rica) Saprissa	5
(Haiti) Arcahaie	0

Final
(Costa Rica) Alajuelense	3
(Costa Rica) Saprissa	2

Play-in round
(Honduras) Marathón	1
(Canada) Forge FC	0

Play-in round
(Honduras) Motagua	2 (2)
(Nicaragua) Real Estelí (p)	2 (4)

== Preliminary round ==
In the preliminary round, the matchups were decided by draw: PR-1 through PR-6. The team from Pot 1 in the draw hosted the single-leg match.

=== Summary ===
Four of the six matches were played from 20–22 October 2020. Due to CONCACAF's COVID-19 testing protocol, one match was cancelled, and another match was rescheduled to 4 November.

Team 1	Score	Team 2
FAS (El Salvador)	1–1 (4–5 p)	(Nicaragua) Managua
Alajuelense (Costa Rica)	3–0	(Dominican Republic) Cibao
Municipal Limeño (El Salvador)	1–2	(Canada) Forge FC
Independiente (Panama)	0–0 (2–4 p)	(Guatemala) Antigua GFC
Arcahaie (Haiti)	3–0 (w/o) (Note: The preliminary round match between Arcahaie and Verdes, originally scheduled to be played on 20 October 2020, 20:00 UTC−4, at the Estadio Olímpico Félix Sánchez, Santo Domingo, was postponed due to four players and four staff members from Verdes testing positive for COVID-19. Verdes later withdrew from the competition, awarding Arcahaie a 3–0 walkover win into the Round of 16.)	(Belize) Verdes
Motagua (Honduras)	2–2 (15–14 p)	(Guatemala) Comunicaciones

=== Matches ===
20 October 2020
22:00 (20:00 UTC−6)

FAS (El Salvador)	1–1	(Nicaragua) Managua
Areco 13' (pen.)	Report	Mendieta 58'
Penalties
García (penalty scored); Areco (penalty missed); Peñaranda (penalty scored); Torres (penalty scored); Rodriguez (penalty scored); Chigüila (penalty missed)	4–5	(penalty missed) Peláez; (penalty scored) Gallego; (penalty scored) Zúñiga; (penalty scored) Castillo; (penalty scored) Serapio; (penalty scored) Figueroa

Estadio Cuscatlán, San Salvador
Attendance: 0
Referee: Oliver Vergara (Panama)

4 November 2020 (Note: The preliminary round match between Alajuelense and Cibao was originally scheduled to be played on 21 October 2020, 20:00 UTC−6, but was rescheduled to 22 October 2020, 16:00 UTC−6, due to eleven COVID-19 cases in the Alajuelense team. It was postponed for a second time to allow for additional COVID-19 testing due to unspecified inconsistencies which indicated that CONCACAF protocols may not have been followed. It was rescheduled to 4 November 2020, 17:00 UTC−6.)
18:00 (17:00 UTC−6)

Alajuelense (Costa Rica)	3–0	(Dominican Republic) Cibao
Saborío 23' (pen.), 82'; Mora 36'	Report

Estadio Alejandro Morera Soto, Alajuela
Attendance: 0
Referee: Selvin Brown (Honduras)

22 October 2020
20:15 (18:15 UTC−6)

Municipal Limeño (El Salvador)	1–2	(Canada) Forge FC
K. Oviedo 38'	Report	Choinière 21'; Novak 83'

Estadio Cuscatlán, San Salvador
Attendance: 0
Referee: Selvin Brown (Honduras)

21 October 2020
20:00 (19:00 UTC−5)

Independiente (Panama)	0–0	(Guatemala) Antigua GFC
	Report
Penalties
Fajardo (penalty missed); Rouse (penalty scored); Browne (penalty scored); González (penalty missed)	2–4	(penalty scored) Arriola; (penalty scored) Domínguez; (penalty scored) M. Hernández; (penalty scored) Ojeda

Estadio Rommel Fernández, Panama City
Attendance: 0
Referee: Diego Montaño (Mexico)

20 October 2020
20:00 (20:00 UTC−4)

Arcahaie (Haiti)	3–0 Awarded (w/o)	(Belize) Verdes
	Report

Estadio Olímpico Félix Sánchez, Santo Domingo (Dominican Republic) (Note: The preliminary round match between Arcahaie and Verdes played at Estadio Olímpico Félix Sánchez, Santo Domingo (Dominican Republic), due to the inability of Arcahaie to play the match at Stade Sylvio Cator, Port-au-Prince.)
Attendance: 0
Referee: Reon Radix (Grenada)

22 October 2020
22:30 (20:30 UTC−6)

Motagua (Honduras)	2–2	(Guatemala) Comunicaciones
Galvaliz 55'; López 60'	Report	Lezcano 38'; Herrera 49'
Penalties
Moreira (penalty scored); Crisanto (penalty scored); Galvaliz (penalty scored); López (penalty missed); Castillo (penalty scored); Méndez (penalty scored); Montes (penalty missed); Izaguirre (penalty scored); Castellanos (penalty scored); Rougier (penalty scored); Moreira (penalty scored); Crisanto (penalty scored); Galvaliz (penalty scored); Castillo (penalty scored); López (penalty scored); Méndez (penalty scored); Izaguirre (penalty missed); Montes (penalty scored)	15–14	(penalty scored) Contreras; (penalty missed) Galindo; (penalty scored) Murillo; (penalty scored) Lezcano; (penalty scored) Herrera; (penalty scored) Mejía; (penalty missed) Gordillo; (penalty scored) Grijalva; (penalty scored) Castrillo; (penalty scored) Calderón; (penalty scored) Contreras; (penalty scored) Galindo; (penalty scored) Murillo; (penalty scored) Lezcano; (penalty scored) Herrera; (penalty scored) Mejía; (penalty missed) Gordillo; (penalty missed) Grijalva

Estadio Tiburcio Carías Andino, Tegucigalpa
Attendance: 0
Referee: Keylor Herrera (Costa Rica)

== Round of 16 ==
In the round of 16, the matchups were decided by draw: R16-1 through R16-8. The team from Pot 3 in the draw hosted the single-leg match, except for the match between Alajuelense and San Francisco, where the higher-seeded team based on the CONCACAF Club Ranking hosted the match.

=== Summary ===
Six of the eight matches were played from 3–5 November 2020. Due to CONCACAF's COVID-19 testing protocol, one match was rescheduled to 24 November. Another match was also rescheduled to 24 November due to the postponement of a preliminary round match.

Team 1	Score	Team 2
Saprissa (Costa Rica)	4–1	(Guatemala) Municipal
Marathón (Honduras)	1–1 (4–3 p)	(Guatemala) Antigua GFC
Tauro (Panama)	1–2	(Canada) Forge FC
Waterhouse (Jamaica)	1–3	(Haiti) Arcahaie
Alianza (El Salvador)	1–1 (3–4 p)	(Honduras) Motagua
Olimpia (Honduras)	6–0	(Nicaragua) Managua
Alajuelense (Costa Rica)	1–0 (Note: The round of 16 match between Alajuelense and San Francisco was originally drawn as a home match of San Francisco as they were from Pot 3 in the draw, but was later played as a home match of Alajuelense after the format change, as they were the higher-seeded team based on the CONCACAF Club Ranking.)	(Panama) San Francisco
Herediano (Costa Rica)	0–1	(Nicaragua) Real Estelí

=== Matches ===
5 November 2020 (Note: The round of 16 match between Saprissa and Municipal was originally scheduled to be played on 4 November 2020, 19:15 UTC−6, but was rescheduled to 5 November 2020, 21:30 UTC−6, to allow for additional testing after three new COVID-19 cases were detected in the Municipal team during pre-match testing.)
22:30 (21:30 UTC−6)

Saprissa (Costa Rica)	4–1	(Guatemala) Municipal
Venegas 33', 38', 50', 54'	Report	Rocca 20'

Estadio Ricardo Saprissa Aymá, San José
Attendance: 0
Referee: Luis Enrique Santander (Mexico)

3 November 2020
22:15 (21:15 UTC−6)

Marathón (Honduras)	1–1	(Guatemala) Antigua GFC
Banegas 41' (pen.)	Report	N. Martínez 5'
Penalties
Volpi (penalty scored); Banegas (penalty missed); Palermo (penalty scored); Cálix (penalty scored); Johnson (penalty scored)	4–3	(penalty missed) Arriola; (penalty scored) Dominguez; (penalty scored) M. Hernández; (penalty scored) Ojeda; (penalty missed) Arreola

Estadio Olímpico Metropolitano, San Pedro Sula
Attendance: 0
Referee: Ismael Cornejo (El Salvador)

3 November 2020
20:00 (20:00 UTC−5)

Tauro (Panama)	1–2	(Canada) Forge FC
Aguilar 18'	Report	Babouli 11'; Krutzen 90+1' (pen.)

Estadio Rommel Fernández, Panama City
Attendance: 0
Referee: Nima Saghafi (United States)

5 November 2020
18:00 (18:00 UTC−5)

Waterhouse (Jamaica)	1–3	(Haiti) Arcahaie
Howell 81'	Report	Calixte 12'; Louis-Jean 31'; Pierre Paul 60'

Stadium East, Kingston
Attendance: 0
Referee: Ricangel de Leça (Aruba)

4 November 2020
22:30 (21:30 UTC−6)

Alianza (El Salvador)	1–1	(Honduras) Motagua
Zelaya 80' (pen.)	Report	Castellanos 90+1'
Penalties
Cienfuegos (penalty missed); Mercado (penalty scored); Blanco (penalty missed); Zelaya (penalty scored); Tamacas (penalty scored)	3–4	(penalty scored) Moreira; (penalty scored) Galvaliz; (penalty scored) Elvir; (penalty missed) López; (penalty scored) Castillo

Estadio Cuscatlán, San Salvador
Attendance: 0
Referee: John Pitti (Panama)

5 November 2020
22:30 (21:30 UTC−6)

Olimpia (Honduras)	6–0	(Nicaragua) Managua
Casildo 8'; Chirinos 17'; Arboleda 51'; Rodríguez 62'; Bengtson 64'; Bernárdez 82'	Report

Estadio Tiburcio Carías Andino, Tegucigalpa
Attendance: 0
Referee: Oscar Moncada (Honduras) (Note: Oshane Nation of Jamaica was originally scheduled to officiate the round of 16 match between Olimpia and Managua, but the officiating crew was unable to travel to Honduras in time for the match due to adverse weather conditions caused by Hurricane Eta. As a result, a back-up officiating crew of local FIFA referees was appointed.)

24 November 2020 (Note: The round of 16 match between San Francisco and the winner of the preliminary round match between Alajuelense and Cibao was originally scheduled to be played on 3 November 2020, 20:15 UTC−5, but was postponed due to the postponement of the preliminary round match between Alajuelense and Cibao. It was rescheduled to be played on 24 November 2020, 21:15 UTC−6.)
22:15 (21:15 UTC−6)

Alajuelense (Costa Rica)	1–0	(Panama) San Francisco
Montenegro 61'	Report

Estadio Alejandro Morera Soto, Alajuela
Attendance: 0
Referee: Daneon Parchment (Jamaica)

24 November 2020 (Note: The round of 16 match between Herediano and Real Estelí was originally scheduled to be played on 5 November 2020, 19:15 UTC−6, but was postponed after members of both teams tested positive for COVID-19 and discrepancies in testing were discovered. It was rescheduled to 24 November 2020, 19:00 UTC−6.)
20:00 (19:00 UTC−6)

Herediano (Costa Rica)	0–1	(Nicaragua) Real Estelí
	Report	Betancur 19'

Estadio Nacional de Costa Rica, San José
Attendance: 0
Referee: Bryan López (Guatemala)

== Quarter-finals ==
In the quarter-finals, the matchups were determined as follows:

- QF1: Winner R16-1 vs. Winner R16-2
- QF2: Winner R16-3 vs. Winner R16-4
- QF3: Winner R16-5 vs. Winner R16-6
- QF4: Winner R16-7 vs. Winner R16-8

The higher-seeded team based on the CONCACAF Club Ranking hosted the single-leg match.

=== Summary ===
The winners of the quarter-finals qualified for the 2021 CONCACAF Champions League. The losers entered the play-in round. The matches were played on 1–2 December 2020.

Team 1	Score	Team 2
Marathón (Honduras)	0–2	(Costa Rica) Saprissa
Arcahaie (Haiti)	1–1 (4–2 p)	(Canada) Forge FC
Olimpia (Honduras)	2–0	(Honduras) Motagua
Alajuelense (Costa Rica)	2–1	(Nicaragua) Real Estelí

=== Matches ===
1 December 2020
22:15 (21:15 UTC−6)

Marathón (Honduras)	0–2	(Costa Rica) Saprissa
	Report	Venegas 13', 55'

Estadio Tiburcio Carías Andino, Tegucigalpa
Attendance: 0
Referee: Oscar Macías (Mexico)

1 December 2020
20:00 (21:00 UTC−4)

Arcahaie (Haiti)	1–1	(Canada) Forge FC
Jolicoeur 59'	Report	Krutzen 45+1' (pen.)
Penalties
Thomas (penalty scored); Alesy (penalty scored); Anacius (penalty scored); Charles (penalty scored)	4–2	(penalty missed) Krutzen; (penalty missed) Achinioti-Jönsson; (penalty scored) Edgar; (penalty scored) Babouli

Estadio Olímpico Félix Sánchez, Santo Domingo (Dominican Republic) (Note: The quarter-final match between Arcahaie and Forge FC was played at Estadio Olímpico Félix Sánchez, Santo Domingo (Dominican Republic), due to the inability of Arcahaie to play the match at Stade Sylvio Cator, Port-au-Prince.)
Attendance: 0
Referee: Oshane Nation (Jamaica)

2 December 2020
22:15 (21:15 UTC−6)

Olimpia (Honduras)	2–0	(Honduras) Motagua
Nuñez 32'; Flores 54'	Report

Estadio Tiburcio Carías Andino, Tegucigalpa
Attendance: 0
Referee: Adonai Escobedo (Mexico)

2 December 2020
20:00 (19:00 UTC−6)

Alajuelense (Costa Rica)	2–1	(Nicaragua) Real Estelí
Ruiz 24'; Martínez 56'	Report	Barrera 44'

Estadio Alejandro Morera Soto, Alajuela
Attendance: 0
Referee: Rubiel Vazquez (United States)

== Play-in round ==
In the play-in, the matchups were determined as follows:

- PI1: Loser QF1 vs. Loser QF2
- PI2: Loser QF3 vs. Loser QF4

The higher-seeded team based on the CONCACAF Club Ranking hosted the single-leg match.

=== Summary ===
The winners of the play-in round qualified for the 2021 CONCACAF Champions League. The matches were played on 8 and 9 December 2020.

Team 1	Score	Team 2
Marathón (Honduras)	1–0	(Canada) Forge FC
Motagua (Honduras)	2–2 (2–4 p)	(Nicaragua) Real Estelí

=== Matches ===
8 December 2020
22:00 (21:00 UTC−6)

Marathón (Honduras)	1–0	(Canada) Forge FC
Solano 18'	Report

Estadio Tiburcio Carías Andino, Tegucigalpa
Attendance: 0
Referee: Bryan López (Guatemala)

9 December 2020
22:00 (21:00 UTC−6)

Motagua (Honduras)	2–2	(Nicaragua) Real Estelí
K. López 37'; Galvaliz 52' (pen.)	Report	Barrera 66'; Mercado 90'
Penalties
W. Crisanto (penalty scored); Méndez (penalty scored); Elvir (penalty missed); Peña (penalty missed)	2–4	(penalty scored) Rosas; (penalty scored) Rodríguez; (penalty scored) Acuña; (penalty scored) L. López

Estadio Tiburcio Carías Andino, Tegucigalpa
Attendance: 0
Referee: Keylor Herrera (Costa Rica)

== Semi-finals ==
In the semi-finals, the matchups were determined as follows:

- SF1: Winner QF1 vs. Winner QF2
- SF2: Winner QF3 vs. Winner QF4

The higher-seeded team based on the CONCACAF Club Ranking hosted the single-leg match.

=== Summary ===
The matches were played on 20 and 22 January 2021.

Team 1	Score	Team 2
Saprissa (Costa Rica)	5–0	(Haiti) Arcahaie
Alajuelense (Costa Rica)	0–0 (5–4 p)	(Honduras) Olimpia

=== Matches ===
22 January 2021 (Note: The semi-final match between Saprissa and Arcahaie was originally scheduled to be played on 20 January 2021, 19:00 UTC−6, but was rescheduled to 22 January 2021, 16:00 UTC−6, to ensure Arcahaie had enough time to complete all necessary immigration processes required prior to traveling from Haiti to Costa Rica.)
17:00 (16:00 UTC−6)

Saprissa (Costa Rica)	5–0	(Haiti) Arcahaie
Espíndola 16'; Rodríguez 31'; Marín 48'; Bolaños 56'; Torres 66'	Report

Estadio Ricardo Saprissa Aymá, San José
Attendance: 0
Referee: Reon Radix (Grenada)

20 January 2021
22:00 (21:00 UTC−6)

Alajuelense (Costa Rica)	0–0	(Honduras) Olimpia
	Report
Penalties
Ruiz (penalty scored); Román (penalty scored); Cubero (penalty scored); Faerrón (penalty scored); Arreola (penalty scored)	5–4	(penalty scored) Arboleda; (penalty scored) Chirinos; (penalty scored) Hernández; (penalty missed) Fonseca; (penalty scored) Leverón

Estadio Alejandro Morera Soto, Alajuela
Attendance: 0
Referee: Mario Escobar (Guatemala)

== Final ==
In the final (Winner SF1 vs. Winner SF2), the higher-seeded team based on the CONCACAF Club Ranking hosted the single-leg match.

=== Summary ===
The match was played on 3 February 2021.

Team 1	Score	Team 2
Alajuelense (Costa Rica)	3–2	(Costa Rica) Saprissa

=== Match ===
3 February 2021
22:00 (21:00 UTC−6)

Alajuelense (Costa Rica)	3–2	(Costa Rica) Saprissa
Sequeira 33'; Román 63'; López 66'	Report	Bolaños 18'; Angulo 87'

Estadio Alejandro Morera Soto, Alajuela
Attendance: 0
Referee: Iván Barton (El Salvador)

== Top goalscorers ==
Team eliminated or inactive for this round.

Rank	Player	Team	Goals	By round					
Rank	Player	Team	Goals	PR	R16	QF	PI	SF	F
1	(Costa Rica) Johan Venegas	(Costa Rica) Saprissa	6		4	2			
2	(Nicaragua) Juan Barrera	(Nicaragua) Real Estelí	2			1	1		
2	(Costa Rica) Christian Bolaños	(Costa Rica) Saprissa	2					1	1
2	(Argentina) Matías Galvaliz	(Honduras) Motagua	2	1			1		
2	(Belgium) Daniel Krutzen	(Canada) Forge FC	2		1	1			
2	(Honduras) Kevin López	(Honduras) Motagua	2	1			1		
2	(Costa Rica) Álvaro Saborío	(Costa Rica) Alajuelense	2	2					

== Qualification to CONCACAF Champions League ==
The top six teams qualified for the 2021 CONCACAF Champions League, i.e., champions, runners-up, both losing semi-finalists, and the two winners of the play-in round contested by the four losing quarter-finalists.

Pos	Team	Pld	W	D	L	GF	GA	GD	Pts	Qualification
1	(Costa Rica) Alajuelense	4	3	1	0	6	3	+3	10	Champions; 2021 CONCACAF Champions League
2	(Costa Rica) Saprissa	4	3	0	1	13	4	+9	9	Runners-up; 2021 CONCACAF Champions League
3	(Honduras) Olimpia	3	2	1	0	8	0	+8	7	Semi-finalists; 2021 CONCACAF Champions League
4	(Haiti) Arcahaie	3	1	1	1	4	7	−3	4	Semi-finalists; 2021 CONCACAF Champions League
5	(Nicaragua) Real Estelí	3	1	1	1	4	4	0	4	Play-in round winners; 2021 CONCACAF Champions League
6	(Honduras) Marathón	3	1	1	1	2	3	−1	4	Play-in round winners; 2021 CONCACAF Champions League
7	(Canada) Forge FC	3	1	1	1	3	3	0	4	Play-in round losers
8	(Honduras) Motagua	3	0	2	1	3	5	−2	2	Play-in round losers
9	(Guatemala) Antigua GFC	1	0	1	0	1	1	0	1	Round of 16 losers
10	(El Salvador) Alianza	1	0	1	0	1	1	0	1	Round of 16 losers
11	(Panama) Tauro	1	0	0	1	1	2	−1	0	Round of 16 losers
12	(Costa Rica) Herediano	1	0	0	1	0	1	−1	0	Round of 16 losers
13	(Panama) San Francisco	1	0	0	1	0	1	−1	0	Round of 16 losers
14	(Jamaica) Waterhouse	1	0	0	1	1	3	−2	0	Round of 16 losers
15	(Guatemala) Municipal	1	0	0	1	1	4	−3	0	Round of 16 losers
16	(Nicaragua) Managua	1	0	0	1	0	6	−6	0	Round of 16 losers

Source: CONCACAF
Rules for classification: 1) Points; 2) Goal difference; 3) Goals scored; 4) Away goals scored; 5) Wins; 6) Away wins; 7) Disciplinary points; 8) Drawing of lots (Regulations Article 12.11).

== Awards ==
The following awards were given at the conclusion of the tournament:

Award	Player	Team
Golden Ball	(Honduras) Alexander López	(Costa Rica) Alajuelense
Golden Boot	(Costa Rica) Johan Venegas	(Costa Rica) Saprissa
Golden Glove	(Costa Rica) Leonel Moreira	(Costa Rica) Alajuelense
Best Young Player	(Costa Rica) Fernán Faerron	(Costa Rica) Alajuelense
Fair Play Award	—	(Costa Rica) Alajuelense

Team of the Tournament
Position	Player	Team
GK	(Costa Rica) Leonel Moreira	(Costa Rica) Alajuelense
DF	(Costa Rica) Yurguin Román	(Costa Rica) Alajuelense
DF	(Costa Rica) Fernán Faerron	(Costa Rica) Alajuelense
DF	(Argentina) Esteban Espíndola	(Costa Rica) Saprissa
DF	(Honduras) Elvin Oliva	(Honduras) Olimpia
MF	(Honduras) Alexander López	(Costa Rica) Alajuelense
MF	(Costa Rica) Adrián Martínez	(Costa Rica) Alajuelense
MF	(Costa Rica) Michael Barrantes	(Costa Rica) Saprissa
MF	(Argentina) Mariano Torres	(Costa Rica) Saprissa
FW	(Haiti) Kervens Jolicoeur	(Haiti) Arcahaie
FW	(Costa Rica) Johan Venegas	(Costa Rica) Saprissa

== See also ==
- 2021 CONCACAF Champions League
