= Leonel Moreira =

Costa Rican football player (born 1990)

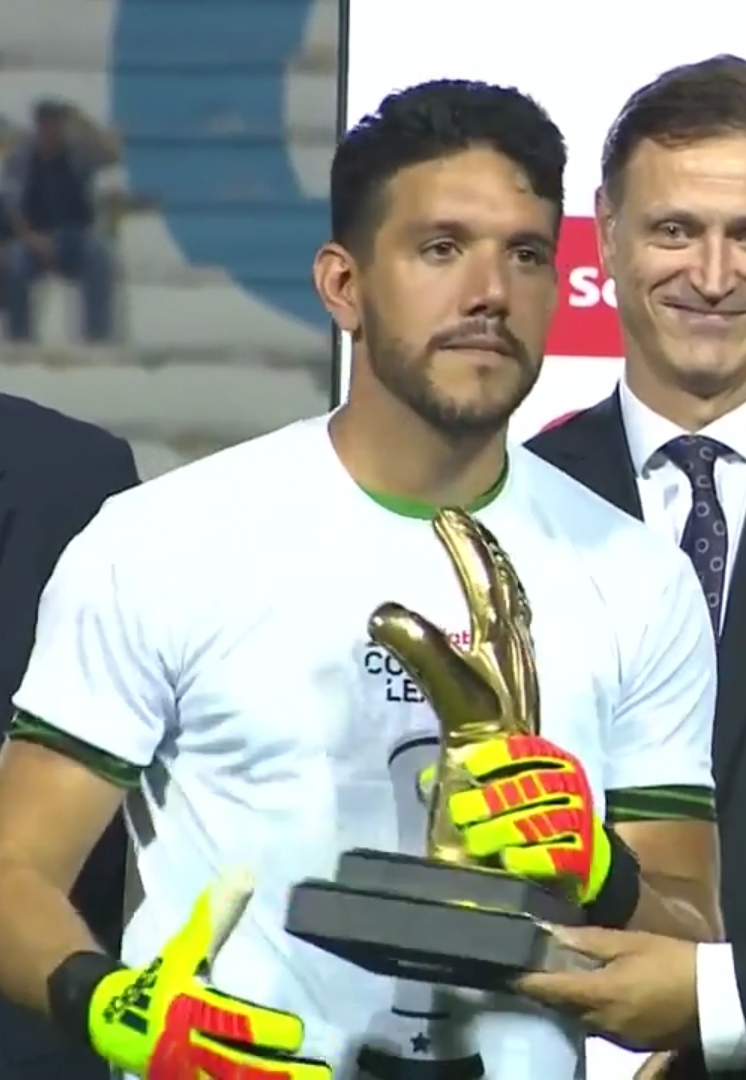
- Moreira in 2018

Personal information
- Full name: Leonel Gerardo Moreira Ledezma
- Date of birth: 2 April 1990 (age 36)
- Place of birth: Heredia, Costa Rica
- Height: 1.80 m (5 ft 11 in)
- Position: Goalkeeper

Team information
- Current team: Sporting San José
- Number: 23

Senior career*
Years	Team	Apps	(Gls)
2009–2019	Herediano	293	(0)
2019–2021	Pachuca	0	(0)
2019	→ Bolívar (loan)	23	(0)
2020–2021	→ Alajuelense (loan)	57	(0)
2021–2024	Alajuelense	136	(0)
2025	Puntarenas	24	(0)
2025–	Sporting San José	0	(0)

International career^{‡}
2011–2022	Costa Rica	24	(0)
- * Club domestic league appearances and goals as of 14 May 2025 ‡ National team caps and goals as of 2 June 2022

Leonel Gerardo Moreira Ledezma (born 2 April 1990) is a Costa Rican professional footballer who plays as a goalkeeper for Sporting San José.

== Club career ==
Moreira came through the Herediano youth system and has only played for the Florenses.

== International career ==
Moreira was in Costa Rica's 2007 FIFA U-17 World Cup squad.

He made his senior debut for Costa Rica in a July 2011 Copa América match against Colombia and has, as of May 2014, earned a total of 5 caps, scoring no goals. He was a non-playing squad member at the 2011 and 2013 CONCACAF Gold Cups.

In May 2018 he was named in Costa Rica's 23 man squad for the 2018 FIFA World Cup in Russia.

== Career statistics ==
=== International ===
Statistics accurate as of match played 21 July 2021

Costa Rica
Year	Apps	Goals
2011	3	0
2013	1	0
2014	1	0
2016	1	0
2017	2	0
2018	2	0
2019	5	0
2021	8	0
2022	1	0
Total	24	0

== Honours ==
Herediano

- Liga FPD: Clausura 2012, Clausura 2013, Clausura 2015, Clausura 2016, Clausura 2017, Apertura 2019
- CONCACAF League: 2018

Alajuelense

- Liga FPD: Apertura 2020
- CONCACAF League: 2020
- CONCACAF Central American Cup: 2023, 2024

Individual

- CONCACAF League Golden Glove: 2018, 2020, 2022
- CONCACAF Central American Cup Golden Glove: 2023, 2024

== Personal life ==
Moreira is married to Yuli Granados and they have a son, Santiago.
