= Roger Rojas =

Honduran footballer (born 1990)

Personal information
- Full name: Roger Fabricio Rojas Lazo
- Date of birth: 9 June 1990 (age 36)
- Place of birth: Tegucigalpa, Honduras
- Height: 1.72 m (5 ft 8 in)
- Position: Striker

Team information
- Current team: Sporting San José

Senior career*
Years	Team	Apps	(Gls)
2007–2017	Olimpia	119	(70)
2014–2015	→ Al-Ettifaq (loan)	11	(4)
2015–2016	→ Necaxa (loan)	13	(5)
2018–2019	Alajuelense	68	(37)
2019	Sabah	11	(0)
2020	Tolima	7	(0)
2021	Cartaginés	34	(10)
2022–	Sporting San José	14	(2)

International career^{‡}
2007	Honduras U17		(9)
2008–2009	Honduras U20		(13)
2010–	Honduras	33	(3)
- * Club domestic league appearances and goals as of 12:37, 2 June 2022 (UTC) ‡ National team caps and goals as of 25 July 2021

Roger Fabricio Rojas Lazo (born 9 June 1990), nicknamed RoRo, is a Honduran professional footballer for Costa Rican club Sporting San José.

Due to his style of play, has been compared to Wilmer Velásquez.

== Club career ==
Born in Tegucigalpa, Rojas plays as a striker for Olimpia. In April 2013, he scored his 50th league goal against Platense aged 22, making him the youngest player to reach the milestone and surpassing national team striker Jerry Bengtson who was 24 when he scored his 50th.

=== Al-Ettifaq ===
In July 2014, Rojas was loaned to Saudi Arabian side Ettifaq for a year. and scored his first goal in Crown Prince Cup against Al Mojzel.

=== Necaxa ===
In January 2015, Rojas was loaned to Mexican side Necaxa for six months.

=== Sabah ===
On 20 August 2019, Rojas signed a one-year contract with Azerbaijan Premier League side Sabah FC. On 26 December 2019, Rojas left Sabah by mutual consent.

=== Tolima ===
Following his departure from Sabah, Rojas was signed by Deportes Tolima at the request of head coach Hernán Torres, his former Alajuelense coach.

== International career ==
He represented Honduras in the 2009 FIFA U-20 World Cup.

Rojas made his senior debut against El Salvador on 5 September 2010, scoring his first goal in the process. This goal also meant that Rojas became the youngest ever goal scorer in the Honduras national team's history.

=== International goals ===
Scores and results list Honduras' goal tally first.

#	Date	Venue	Opponent	Score	Result	Competition
1	4 September 2010	Los Angeles Memorial Coliseum, Los Angeles, United States	El Salvador	2–1	2–2	Friendly
2	12 October 2010	Los Angeles Memorial Coliseum, Los Angeles, United States	Guatemala	1–0	2–0	Friendly
3	11 June 2013	Estadio Tiburcio Carías Andino, Tegucigalpa, Honduras	Jamaica	2–0	2–0	2014 FIFA World Cup qualification

== Honours ==
C.D. Olimpia

- Liga Profesional de Honduras (6): 2009–10 C, 2011–12 A, 2011–12 C, 2012–13 A, 2012–13 C, 2013–14 C
- CONCACAF League: 2017

Individual

- CONCACAF League Team of the Tournament: 2017
- CONCACAF League Golden Boot: 2017
