= Alexander López =

Honduran footballer (born 1992)

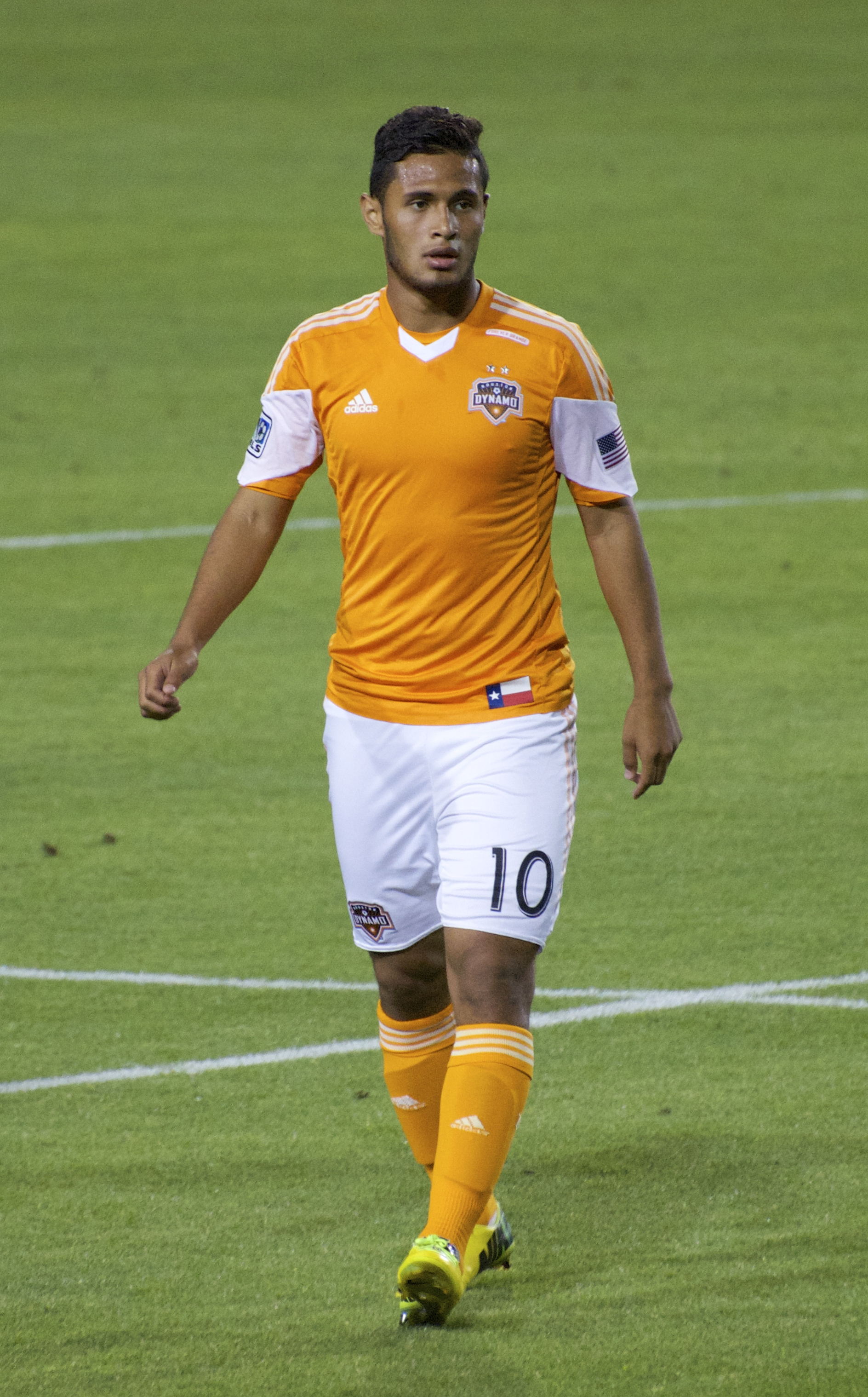
- López with the Houston Dynamo in 2014

Personal information
- Full name: Alexander Agustín López Rodríguez
- Date of birth: 5 June 1992 (age 34)
- Place of birth: Tegucigalpa, Honduras
- Height: 1.77 m (5 ft 10 in)
- Position: Attacking midfielder

Team information
- Current team: Sporting
- Number: 10

Youth career
- 1999–2009: Olimpia

Senior career*
Years	Team	Apps	(Gls)
2010–2013	Olimpia	95	(6)
2013–2015	Houston Dynamo	28	(0)
2016	Olimpia	19	(2)
2016–2017	Al-Khaleej	11	(2)
2017	Olimpia	27	(12)
2018–2023	Alajuelense	245	(30)
2024–2025	Olancho FC	62	(12)
2026–	Sporting	5	(0)

International career^{‡}
2009	Honduras U17	3	(0)
2010–2011	Honduras U20	6	(3)
2011–2012	Honduras U23	9	(1)
2010–2025	Honduras	68	(7)
Medal record
Men's football
Representing Honduras
CONCACAF Nations League
Bronze medal – third place	2021
- * Club domestic league appearances and goals as of 16 February 2026 ‡ National team caps and goals as of 29 December 2025

Alexander Agustín López Rodríguez (born 5 June 1992) is a Honduran professional footballer who plays as an attacking midfielder for Liga FPD club Sporting.

== Club career ==
=== Early career ===
Born in Tegucigalpa, Distrito Central, Francisco Morazán, López joined Olimpia's youth system at the age of 7. He remained in the youth ranks until 2010, where he was finally able to make the breakthrough into the first team.

=== Olimpia ===
On 8 August 2010, López made his league debut against Hispano F.C., coming on for Bani Lozano in the 70th minute. He scored his first goal – which was the second of the match – to help seal a 2–0 victory.

Following the 2012 Summer Olympics, López was continuously linked with a move to Europe, with English side Wigan Athletic being an alleged suitor for the young playmaker. However, these transfer links came to nothing, and López remained at Olimpia for the following season. In 2022, a British journalist called Kieran Morris claimed that Wigan's interest in the player, which was reported as fact in national newspapers in the UK and Honduras, had been fabricated by him and his friends, who contacted various press outlets pretending to be a club insider or journalist as a prank.

=== Houston Dynamo ===
On 6 August 2013, López signed for Major League Soccer side Houston Dynamo as a Designated Player. He made his debut for the club on 20 August in the CONCACAF Champions League against W Connection F.C. in a 0–0 draw. He made his league debut 3 days later in the 5–0 defeat against the Montreal Impact. Despite impressing fans with demonstrations of his individual skill – most notably his 30-yard rabona chip for Jason Johnson on his first start against the New York Red Bulls – López was unable to hold down a place in the Dynamo side for the remainder of the 2013 season, as issues with homesickness and fitness prevented Dominic Kinnear from giving the Honduran an extended run in the side. He finished the season with 2 appearances, and providing 1 assist, playing no part in Dynamo's performance in the 2013 Eastern Conference finals.

=== Return to Olimpia ===
On 18 January 2016, López returned to Olimpia and signed a six-month contract after it was confirmed that he would no longer continue with Houston Dynamo. He made his first appearance since his return the following 31 January in a 0–0 draw against Real España, replacing Romell Quioto in the 56th minute. He would help Olimpia win the 2016 Clausura tournament, which was also the club's 30th title win.

=== Al-Khaleej ===
López signed a two-year deal with Saudi Professional League side Khaleej FC on 28 June 2016. He made his debut the following 12 August in the 3–1 defeat against Al-Faisaly, scoring his first goal. On 22 January 2017, the club announced through their social networks that they had terminated the contract of López.

=== Second return to Olimpia ===
After his contract with Al-Khaleej was terminated, López re-signed with Olimpia. On 9 February 2017 he scored in his return match, a 7–1 win over C.D.S. Vida. López would win the inaugural CONCACAF League tournament with Olimpia in October 2017, after his side defeated Santos de Guápiles 4–1 on penalties in the second leg.

=== Alajuelense ===
On 13 January 2018, López signed for Costa Rican side Liga Deportiva Alajuelense. He made his league debut for the club in a 3–1 loss against Pérez Zeledón. López would score his first goal in the return fixture against Pérez Zeledón in a 3–0 win.

=== Sporting ===
On 26 December 2025, after having a brief return to his home country Honduras and playing with Olancho FC, López returned to Costa Rica to sign with first-tier side Sporting F.C.

== International career ==
On 18 November 2008, López made his debut for the Honduras U-17 during the 2009 CONCACAF U-17 Championship qualification match against Belize. He scored his first goal in the 53rd minute in a 9–0 victory. In 2009, he was included by Emilio Umanzor in the 21-man squad for the 2009 FIFA U-17 World Cup in Nigeria.

López represented his country at the 2012 Summer Olympics in London. He would only play three games, as Honduras would be eliminated by Brazil in the quarter-finals.

In October 2010, López made his senior debut for Honduras in a friendly match against Guatemala. He scored his first senior international goal on 1 September 2017 in the 2018 World Cup qualifying match against Trinidad and Tobago in a 2–1 win. His second goal would come on 21 November 2018 in a 4–1 friendly loss against Chile.

== Career statistics ==
=== Club ===
As of match played 29 September 2022

Appearances and goals by club, season and competition
Club	Season	League			National cup (Note: Includes Honduran Cup, U.S. Open Cup, and Kings Cup)		Continental (Note: Includes CONCACAF Champions League and CONCACAF League)		Other (Note: Includes MLS Cup Playoffs and Supercopa de Costa Rica)		Total	
Club	Season	Division	Apps	Goals	Apps	Goals	Apps	Goals	Apps	Goals	Apps	Goals
Olimpia	2009–10	Liga Nacional	6	0	0	0	0	0	—		6	0
Olimpia	2010–11	Liga Nacional	37	3	0	0	7	0	—		44	3
Olimpia	2011–12	Liga Nacional	20	0	0	0	2	0	—		22	0
Olimpia	2012–13	Liga Nacional	32	3	0	0	1	0	—		33	3
Olimpia	Total		95	6	0	0	10	0	—		105	6
Houston Dynamo	2013	Major League Soccer	2	0	—		4	0	0	0	6	0
Houston Dynamo	2014	Major League Soccer	10	0	2	1	—		—		12	1
Houston Dynamo	2015	Major League Soccer	16	0	2	0	—		—		18	0
Houston Dynamo	Total		28	0	4	1	4	0	0	0	36	1
Olimpia	2015–16	Liga Nacional	19	2	0	0	—		—		19	2
Al-Khaleej	2016–17	Saudi Professional League	11	2	1	0	—		—		12	2
Olimpia	2016–17	Liga Nacional	14	9	0	0	—		—		14	9
Olimpia	2017–18	Liga Nacional	13	3	0	0	8	1	—		21	4
Olimpia	Total		27	12	0	0	8	1	—		35	13
Alajulense	2017–18	Liga FPD	25	3	—		—		—		25	3
Alajulense	2018–19	Liga FPD	38	6	—		—		—		38	6
Alajulense	2019–20	Liga FPD	44	7	—		—		—		44	7
Alajulense	2020–21	Liga FPD	36	4	—		5	1	—		42	5
Alajulense	2021–22	Liga FPD	39	4	—		2	0	1	0	42	4
Alajulense	2022–23	Liga FPD	15	1	—		5	1	—		20	2
Alajulense	Total		197	25	—		12	2	1	0	210	27
Career total			377	47	5	1	34	3	1	0	417	51

=== International ===
Scores and results list Honduras goal tally first, score column indicates score after each López goal.

List of international goals scored by Alexander López
No.	Date	Venue	Opponent	Score	Result	Competition
1	1 September 2017	Ato Boldon Stadium, Couva, Trinidad and Tobago	Trinidad and Tobago	1–0	2–1	2018 FIFA World Cup qualification
2	20 November 2018	Estadio Municipal Germán Becker, Temuco, Chile	Chile	1–1	1–4	Friendly
3	15 November 2020	Estadio Doroteo Guamuch Flores, Guatemala City, Guatemala	Guatemala	1–2	1–2	Friendly
4	24 March 2021	Torpedo Stadium, Zhodino, Zhodzina, Belarus	Belarus	1–1	1–1	Friendly
5	17 July 2021	BBVA Stadium, Houston, United States	Panama	2–2	3–2	2021 CONCACAF Gold Cup
6	2 September 2021	BMO Field, Toronto, Canada	Canada	1–0	1–1	2022 FIFA World Cup qualification
7	6 September 2024	Estadio Nacional Chelato Uclés, Tegucigalpa, Honduras	Trinidad and Tobago	1–0	4–0	2024–25 CONCACAF Nations League A

== Honours ==
Olimpia

- CONCACAF League: 2017

Alajuelense

- Liga FPD: Apertura 2020
- CONCACAF League: 2020

Honduras

- CONCACAF Nations League third place: 2021

Individual

- CONCACAF League Team of the Tournament: 2017
- CONCACAF League Golden Ball: 2020
