= Juan Diego Madrigal =

Costa Rican footballer (born 1987)

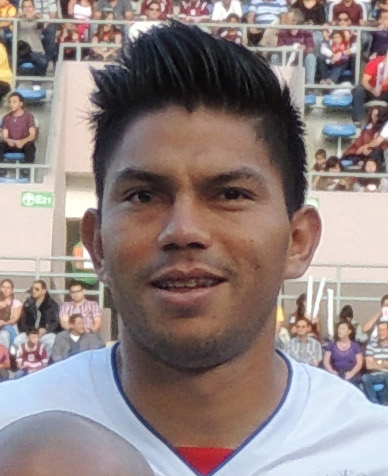

Personal information
- Full name: Juan Diego Madrigal Espinoza
- Date of birth: May 21, 1987 (age 39)
- Place of birth: San José, Costa Rica
- Height: 1.82 m (5 ft 11 1/2 in)
- Position: Defender

Team information
- Current team: Santos Guápiles
- Number: 15

Youth career
- Barrio México

Senior career*
| Years | Team | Apps | (Gls) |
| 2010 | Municipal Liberia | 1 | (0) |
| 2010–2011 | Barrio México | 21 | (1) |
| 2011–2013 | Santos Guápiles | 67 | (5) |
| 2013 | → Fredrikstad (loan) | 6 | (0) |
| 2013 | Deportivo Saprissa | 15 | (0) |
| 2014–2016 | Cartaginés | 71 | (2) |
| 2016 | Municipal Liberia | 17 | (1) |
| 2017– | Santos Guápiles | 193 | (9) |

International career^{‡}
| 2013 | Costa Rica | 7 | (0) |
- * Club domestic league appearances and goals as of 15:01, 22 April 2021 (UTC) ‡ National team caps and goals as of 00:08, 6 October 2021 (UTC)

Juan Diego Madrigal Espinoza (born 21 May 1987) is a Costa Rican footballer who plays for Santos Guápiles as a defender.

== Club career ==
Madrigal started his career with Municipal Liberia making first team debut with the club in 2010. After playing just one match he was transferred to Barrio México. He made 21 appearances for the side, before joining Santos Guápiles in 2011.

In 2013, he joined Norwegian club Fredrikstad on a year loan. However the contract was soon terminated because of the financial difficulties faced by them. Then he returned to Costa Rica by signing for Deportivo Saprissa.

== International career ==
On 10 July 2014, he made his international debut against Cuba in 2013 CONCACAF Gold Cup.

As of 24 September 2014

Costa Rica
| Year | Apps | Goals |
|---|---|---|
| 2013 | 6 | 0 |
| 2014 | 1 | 0 |
| Total | 7 | 0 |

== Honours ==
=== Individual ===
- CONCACAF League Team of the Tournament: 2017
