= Kevin Álvarez (footballer, born 1996) =

Honduran association football player

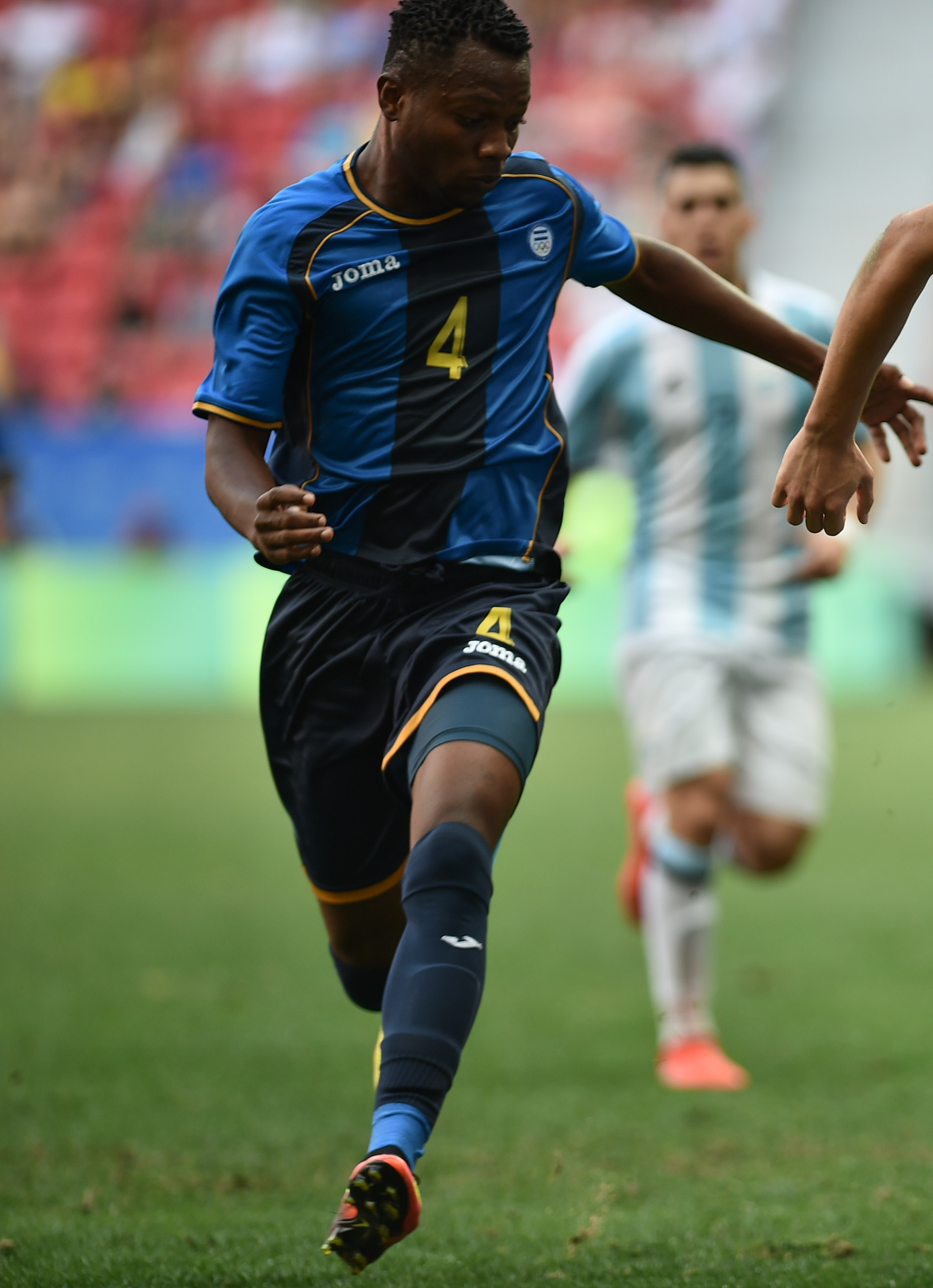
- Álvarez with Honduras at the 2016 Summer Olympics

Personal information
- Full name: Kevin Javier Álvarez Hernández
- Date of birth: 3 August 1996 (age 30)
- Place of birth: San Pedro Sula, Honduras
- Height: 1.81 m (5 ft 11 in)
- Position: Right-back

Senior career*
Years	Team	Apps	(Gls)
2013–2019	Olimpia	121	(8)
2019–2023	Norrköping	6	(0)
2021–2022	→ Real España (loan)	50	(2)
2023–2025	Motagua	33	(1)
2024–2025	→ UPNFM (loan)	6	(2)
Total		216	(13)

International career
2013	Honduras U17	12	(1)
2015	Honduras U20	6	(1)
2015	Honduras U21	4	(0)
2016	Honduras U23	7	(0)
2015–2024	Honduras	15	(0)
Medal record
Men's football
Representing Honduras
CONCACAF Nations League
Third place	2021
- * Club domestic league appearances and goals

Kevin Javier Álvarez Hernández (born 3 August 1996) is a Honduran former professional footballer who played as a right-back. He represented Honduras in the football competition at the 2016 Summer Olympics.

== Honours ==
Olimpia

- CONCACAF League: 2017

Individual

- CONCACAF League Team of the Tournament: 2017
- CONCACAF League Best Young Player: 2017
