= Wílmer Azofeifa =

Costa Rican footballer (born 1994)

Personal information
- Full name: Wílmer Jesus Azofeifa Valverde
- Date of birth: 4 June 1994 (age 32)
- Place of birth: Pococí, Costa Rica
- Height: 1.70 m (5 ft 7 in)
- Position: Midfielder

Team information
- Current team: San Carlos

Senior career*
Years	Team	Apps	(Gls)
2015–2018	Santos de Guápiles	127	(13)
2016	→ Pachuca (loan)	0	(0)
2019–2020	Sarpsborg 08	5	(0)
2019	→ Aalesund (loan)	3	(0)
2020–	San Carlos	190	(17)

International career
2018–	Costa Rica	9	(0)
- * Club domestic league appearances and goals as of 28 December 2025 (UTC)

Wílmer Jesus Azofeifa Valverde (born 4 June 1994) is a Costa Rican professional footballer who plays as a midfielder. He began his professional career with Santos de Guápiles, where his performances earned him international attention and a loan move to Mexican club Pachuca in 2016.

He was born in Pococí and currently plays for Liga FPD club San Carlos.

== International career ==
Azofeifa was called up by coach Óscar Ramírez for friendly matches in March 2018 against Scotland and Tunisia as part of Costa Rica's preparations for the 2018 FIFA World Cup. He made his senior international debut for Costa Rica on 23 March 2018 in a friendly match in Glasgow against Scotland.

In 2019 he joined Norwegian club Sarpsborg 08, marking his first move to European football.

== Honours ==
Individual

- CONCACAF League Team of the Tournament: 2017
