= Ernesto Sinclair =

Panamanian footballer (born 1989)

Personal information
- Full name: Ernesto Arturo Sinclair Chávez
- Date of birth: March 10, 1989 (age 37)
- Place of birth: Panama City, Panama
- Height: 1.67 m (5 ft 6 in)
- Position: Midfielder

Youth career
- Colo-Colo

Senior career*
Years	Team	Apps	(Gls)
2008	Estudiantes		
2008–2009	→ Palestino (loan)		
2010	Arlesey Town		
2010–2011	Sporting San Miguelito	11	(0)
2012–2013	Alianza	16	(1)
2013–2015	Independiente	60	(15)
2016	Plaza Amador	10	(4)
2016–2017	Mineros de Guayana	14	(4)
2017–2018	Plaza Amador	40	(9)
2018–2019	Costa del Este	19	(9)
2019–2020	Sporting San Miguelito	25	(7)
2020	Costa del Este	10	(2)
2021	Universitario	8	(0)
2022	Tauro	25	(1)

International career^{‡}
2019–	Panama	1	(0)
- * Club domestic league appearances and goals as of 20:07, 25 December 2023 (UTC) ‡ National team caps and goals as of 27 January 2019

Ernesto Arturo Sinclair Chávez (born March 10, 1989) is a Panamanian footballer.

== Club career ==
Sinclair moved to Chile with his parents when only 11 years, then played with Argentinian side Estudiantes and in the summer 2008 he returned to Chile, where he played in the Colo-Colo and Magallanes youth teams, to play on loan for Palestino.

He only returned to Panama to join Sporting San Miguelito from English lower league outfit Arlesey Town, then Alianza and later moved to Independiente.

== International ==
He made his debut for Panama on 27 January 2019 in a friendly against the United States, as a starter.

== Honours ==
=== Player ===
Palestino

- Primera División de Chile (1): Runner-up 2008 Clausura
