= Marcos Méndez =

Nicaraguan footballer

Personal information
- Full name: Marcos Noel Méndez Dávila
- Date of birth: February 6, 1986 (age 40)
- Place of birth: Masatepe, Nicaragua
- Position: Midfielder

Team information
- Current team: Managua
- Number: 11

Senior career*
Years	Team	Apps	(Gls)
2004–2007	Masatepe		
2007–2011	Diriangén		
2011–present	Managua		

International career^{‡}
2011–2012	Nicaragua	7	(0)
- * Club domestic league appearances and goals as of 00:49, 25 February 2012 (UTC) ‡ National team caps and goals as of 24 December 2013

Marcos Noel Méndez Dávila (born 6 February 1986) is a Nicaraguan professional midfielder currently playing for Managua.

== Club career ==
Méndez started his career at hometown club Masatepe and played for Diriangén before moving on to Managua in 2011.

== International career ==
Méndez made his debut for Nicaragua in a May 2011 friendly match against Cuba and has, as of December 2013, earned a total of 8 caps, scoring no goals. He has represented his country in 2 FIFA World Cup qualification matches.
