= Michaell Chirinos =

Honduran footballer (born 1995)

Personal information
- Full name: Michaell Anthony Chirinos Cortez
- Date of birth: 17 June 1995 (age 31)
- Place of birth: Tegucigalpa, Honduras
- Height: 1.65 m (5 ft 5 in)
- Position: Winger

Team information
- Current team: Olimpia
- Number: 33

Youth career
- Olimpia

Senior career*
| Years | Team | Apps | (Gls) |
| 2014–2022 | Olimpia | 174 | (50) |
| 2018–2019 | → BUAP (loan) | 33 | (6) |
| 2019 | → Vancouver Whitecaps (loan) | 7 | (1) |
| 2023 | Volos | 14 | (1) |
| 2023–2024 | Saprissa | 14 | (1) |
| 2024– | Olimpia | 65 | (12) |

International career^{‡}
| 2014–2015 | Honduras U20 | 10 | (2) |
| 2017– | Honduras | 22 | (1) |
- * Club domestic league appearances and goals as of 09:38, 12 October 2025 (UTC) ‡ National team caps and goals as of 6 June 2024

Michaell Anthony Chirinos Cortez (born 17 June 1995) is a Honduran professional footballer who plays as a winger for Liga Nacional club Olimpia and the Honduras national team.

== Club career ==
On 14 June 2018, Chirinos signed with Lobos BUAP of Liga MX on a one-year loan from C.D. Olimpia. He scored his first goal on 4 February 2019 in a 1–1 draw against Pachuca.

On 3 August 2019, Chirinos signed with Major League Soccer team Vancouver Whitecaps FC for the remainder of the MLS season. He scored his first goal for the club on September 30, the winner in a 4–3 away victory against the LA Galaxy.

On 22 December 2022, Chirinos signed with Super League Greece club Volos on a one-year contract with the option to extend for a further year. He made his debut two weeks later in the league against Olympiacos, starting and playing 65 minutes in the 0–4 home defeat. He scored his first goal the following 28 January in a 2–3 home defeat to Panetolikos. On 12 May 2023, Chirinos and Volos reached an agreement to terminate his contract at the club.

On 26 July 2023, Chirinos signed with Liga FPD club Deportivo Saprissa. He made his debut the following 10 August in Saprissa's second match of the CONCACAF Central American Cup group stage, scoring once in the 4–0 win against Jocoro. On 4 January 2024, Saprissa announced the departure of Chirinos, citing personal issues as the reason.

One week after departing from Saprissa, Chirinos returned to Olimpia ahead of the Clausura 2024 season.

== International career ==
On 24 March 2024, Chirinos scored his team's only goal in an eventual 3–1 defeat to Costa Rica in the 2024 Copa América qualifying play-offs. The goal was nominated for Goal of the Year at the 2023–24 CONCACAF Awards, before being nominated for the 2024 FIFA Puskás Award.

== Honours ==
Olimpia

- Liga Nacional: 2016 Clausura, 2019 Apertura, 2020 Apertura, 2021 Clausura, 2023 Apertura, 2024 Clausura, 2025 Clausura
- CONCACAF League: 2017, 2022

Saprissa

- Liga FPD: 2023 Apertura

Individual

- CONCACAF League Team of the Tournament: 2017
- CONCACAF League Golden Ball: 2017, 2022
