= Víctor García (footballer, born 1995) =

Salvadoran footballer

Victor García
Personal information
- Full name: Victor Vladimir García Campos
- Date of birth: June 15, 1995 (age 31)
- Place of birth: Usulután, El Salvador
- Height: 1.74 m (5 ft 9 in)
- Position: Winger

Youth career
- 2012–2013: CD Santiagueño
- 2013–2014: Turín FESA FC

Senior career*
Years	Team	Apps	(Gls)
2014–2015	Turín FESA FC		
2015	Toros FC		
2016–2018	CD Águila		
2018–2019	CD FAS		
2020	CD Águila		

International career
2017–	El Salvador	1	(0)
- * Club domestic league appearances and goals

Victor Vladimir García Campos, better known as Victor García (born June 15, 1995) is a Salvadoran professional footballer.

== Club career ==
=== Toros FC ===
In 2015, García signed with Toros FC of Segunda División.

=== Águila ===
García signed with C.D. Águila of the Primera División for the Clausura 2016. With Águila, García reached the final of that tournament, but they were defeated by Dragón (0–1). García did not play in the final.

In December 2018, Águila left García out of the team.

== International career ==
García was called up to the El Salvador for a friendly against Curaçao, on 22 March 2017.

== Honours ==
=== Player ===
==== Club ====
C.D. Águila

- Primera División
  - Runners-up: Clausura 2016
