= Osvaldo Rodríguez (footballer, born 1990) =

Costa Rican footballer

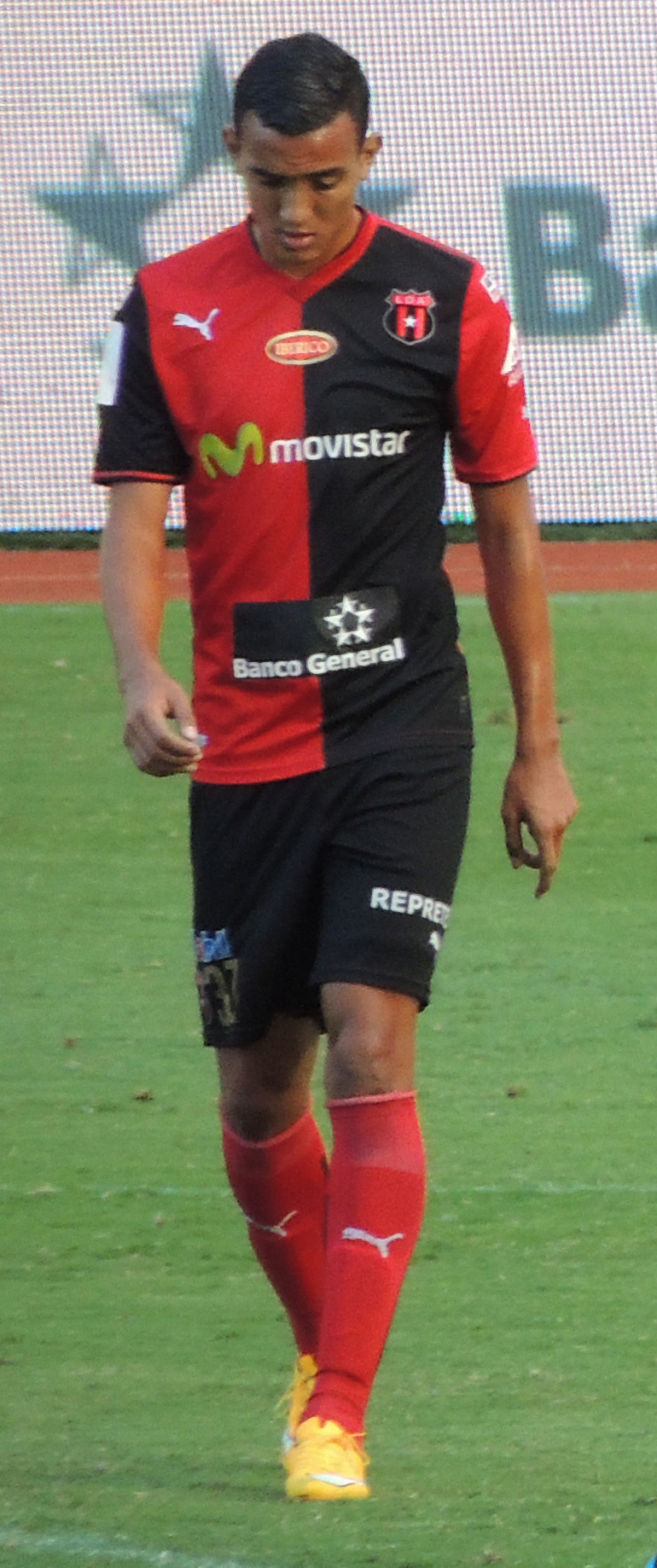
- Osvaldo Rodríguez Flores in 2015

Personal information
- Full name: Osvaldo Roberto Rodríguez Flores
- Date of birth: 17 December 1990 (age 35)
- Place of birth: Guápiles, Costa Rica
- Height: 1.81 m (5 ft 11 in)
- Position: Midfielder

Team information
- Current team: Santos de Guápiles
- Number: 71

Youth career
- –2010: Santos de Guápiles

Senior career*
Years	Team	Apps	(Gls)
2009–2014	Santos de Guápiles	97	(11)
2014–2016	Alajuelense	49	(5)
2016–2018	Santos de Guápiles	100	(13)
2018–2019	San Carlos	30	(3)
2019–	Santos de Guápiles	46	(5)

International career^{‡}
2013–2020	Costa Rica	18	(0)
- * Club domestic league appearances and goals as of 10:04, 9 April 2021 (UTC) ‡ National team caps and goals as of 11 November 2020

Osvaldo Roberto Rodríguez Flores (born 17 December 1990) is a Costa Rican footballer who plays as a right winger.

== Club career ==
Rodríguez started his career at hometown club Santos de Guápiles and joined Alajuelense in 2014.

== International career ==
Rodríguez made his debut for Costa Rica in a January 2013 Copa Centroamericana match against Belize and has, as of June 2014, earned a total of 11 caps, scoring no goals. He represented his country in 1 FIFA World Cup qualification match and he played at the 2013 Copa Centroamericana and the 2013 CONCACAF Gold Cup.

== Honours ==
Costa Rica

- Copa Centroamericana: 2013
