= José Murillo =

Panamanian footballer (born 1995)

Personal information
- Full name: José Manuel Murillo Morán
- Date of birth: 24 February 1995 (age 31)
- Place of birth: Bogotá, Colombia
- Height: 1.74 m (5 ft 9 in)
- Position: Midfielder

Team information
- Current team: Plaza Amador
- Number: 20

Senior career*
Years	Team	Apps	(Gls)
2012–2015	Chepo	24	(8)
2015–2019	Plaza Amador	100	(12)
2019–2020	Deportivo Municipal	30	(3)
2020	Plaza Amador	7	(2)
2020–2021	Comunicaciones	10	(1)
2021–2024	Plaza Amador	82	(11)
2024–2025	Monagas	23	(3)
2025–	Plaza Amador	41	(12)

International career^{‡}
2016–	Panama	19	(1)
- * Club domestic league appearances and goals as of 23 May 2026 ‡ National team caps and goals as of 3 June 2026

José Manuel Murillo Morán (born 24 February 1995) is a Panamanian football player who plays as midfielder for Comunicaciones and the Panama national team.

== Playing career ==
Murillo spent most of his early career with Plaza Amador, before a stint with Deportivo Municipal in 2019. Murillo made his professional debut with Deportivo Municipal in a 3-0 Peruvian Primera División win over Melgar on 17 February 2019. He signed with Comunicaciones on 12 August 2020.

== International career ==
Murillo made his debut for the Panama national team in a 0–0 friendly tie with Nicaragua on 26 February 2020.

== Career statistics ==
As of match played 3 June 2026

Appearances and goals by national team and year
National team	Year	Apps	Goals
Panama	2016	1	0
Panama	2020	3	1
Panama	2021	2	0
Panama	2022	3	0
Panama	2023	6	0
Panama	2025	1	0
Panama	2026	3	0
Total		19	1

=== International goals ===
Scores and results list Panama's goal tally first.

No.	Date	Venue	Opponent	Score	Result	Competition
1.	4 March 2020	Estadio Doroteo Guamuch Flores, Guatemala City, Guatemala	Guatemala	1–0	2–0	Friendly
