= Sporting F.C. =

Association football club in Costa Rica

Sporting
- Full name: Sporting Football Club
- Nicknames: Libertos; Los Albinegros (The White and Blacks)
- Founded: 24 June 2016; 10 years ago
- Ground: Ernesto Rohrmoser Stadium, San José, Costa Rica
- Capacity: 3,000
- Manager: Andrés Carevic
- League: Liga FPD
- 2026 Clausura: 6th
- Website: https://sporting.cr/
Home colours	Away colours

Sporting Football Club, also known as Sporting San José, is a Costa Rican professional football club, that currently competes in the Liga de Fútbol de Primera División, the top division of Costa Rican football league system.

== History ==
On 2 March 2003, a group of Mexican businessmen, led by Jorge Vergara, arrived in Costa Rica to purchase Deportivo Saprissa, of the First Division of that country, in order to acquire all the shares and reduce debts of the club finances. Within the set of owners was Jorge Alarcón, who served as the general manager. The main objectives were the promotion of new talents and transcendence at an international level, which were successfully achieved. For seven years he remained in charge of the team until its sale to another administration. During that time, Alarcón greatly appreciated the country for the opportunity to work in management, so he did not rule out returning.

On 16 June 2016, the disappearance of the subsidiary club that participated in the Second Division, the Saprissa Generation, was confirmed at a press conference by the saprissistas. Due to this, the franchise was released and Jorge learned about this news. For this reason he contacted the owner Andrés Calderón, to found the new team with a different name. Calderón accepted the proposal and the group was renamed "Sporting San José", with its headquarters in the district of Pavas, in the capital. The businessman affirmed that it will give an increase in the football level of the Costa Rican capital, through the creation of schools and the contribution of experienced players. The colours navy blue and gold were chosen for the uniform, and its first coach would be Randall Row, while Gerald Drummond and Marco Herrera would serve as the talent trainers, in U-17 and U-20 categories, respectively. The team's first game in the 2016 Opening Tournament was held on 6 August, at the "Cuty" Monge Stadium in Desamparados, due to the fact that its main venue did not meet the distance requirements between the field and the walls of the stadium. infrastructure. On that occasion the rival was Jacó Rays. At minute 10 of the meeting, the football player Cristian Carrillo scored the first official goal in the history of the club, which meant the 1-0 victory of the Josefinos in his debut. The team was placed in group C, finished as leader with 29 points and obtained 8 wins, 5 draws and 2 losses. With this performance, they qualified for the quarterfinals to face AS Puma Generaleña. The first leg was away on 12 November, and ended in a 4-1 loss. For the round developed a week later, those from the central canton of the capital won with a score of 1-0, but insufficient for the aggregate result, so they were eliminated.

Their second competition of the season was the Clausura 2017, in which the team advanced to the knockout round again after finishing third in group C. Statistically, they recorded seven wins, five draws and three losses, for a total of twenty-five goals in favor. and eighteen against. In the first leg of the quarterfinals, those from the capital won 1-0 over Juventud Escazuceña at the Ernesto Rohrmoser Stadium, this on 9 April. Despite losing 2-1 in the second leg played at the Nicolás Masís Stadium, the series was decided on penalties for equality added to two goals. On that occasion, figures of 2-3 favoured the team to continue in the tournament. However, the two losses in the semifinals of 0-1 in the first leg and 4-0 in the second leg against Jicaral, had repercussions in the elimination of the club. On the other hand, the top scorer in the first year for the Josefinos was Byron Bonilla, who scored eight goals.

On 5 September 2019, it renewed its shield and colours, using black and white as a tribute to the extinct La Libertad team. It was also renamed to "Sporting Football Club". On 23 June 2020 Sporting F.C. manages to win the grand finale of the promotion league, and with this ascend to the First Division of Costa Rica for the first time in its history.

== Stadium ==
Sporting San José plays its home games at Ernesto Rohrmoser Stadium, located in Pavas, San José, with a capacity of 3,000 spectators. The stage was inaugurated on 28 February 2013, for the Central American Games of that year.

Before the founding of the team, the headquarters was used by other Second Division clubs, as well as in various sports, for which Jorge Alarcón negotiated the property negotiations with Johnny Araya, mayor of San José.

== Current squad ==
As of 9 August, 2026

Note: Flags indicate national team as defined under FIFA eligibility rules; some limited exceptions apply. Players may hold more than one non-FIFA nationality.

No.	Pos.	Nation	Player
2	DF	CRC	Yostin Salinas
3	DF	CRC	Kevin Espinoza
4	DF	CRC	Fabio Coronado
5	DF	CRC	Ariel Soto
6	MF	CRC	Gabriel Leiva
7	FW	HON	José Pinto
8	MF	HON	Carlos Pineda
9	FW	CRC	Mayron George
10	MF	HON	Alexander López
11	FW	PAR	Renzo Carballo
16	FW	CRC	Randy Ramírez
17	GK	CRC	Johnny Álvarez

No.	Pos.	Nation	Player
19	FW	CRC	Josimar Méndez
20	DF	CRC	Ryan Bolaños
21	FW	CRC	Marco Ureña
22	MF	CRC	Youstin Salas
23	GK	CRC	Leonel Moreira
24	MF	CRC	Anderson Barboza
25	FW	CRC	Kaden Farrier
26	DF	CRC	Giancarlo González (captain)
27	DF	CRC	Adrián Chévez
28	FW	CRC	Joshua Navarro (on loan from Herediano)
33	DF	MEX	Eduardo Pastrana
36	FW	CRC	Joser González
