= CONCACAF League =

North American annual club football competition

- Organiser(s): CONCACAF
- Founded: 2017; 9 years ago
- Abolished: 2022; 4 years ago
- Region: North America; Central America; Caribbean
- Teams: 22
- Qualifier for: CONCACAF Champions League
- Related competitions: CONCACAF Central American Cup; CONCACAF Caribbean Cup
- Last champions: (Honduras) Olimpia (2nd title)
- Most championships: (Honduras) Olimpia (2 titles)
- Website: www.concacaf.com/concacaf-league/

The CONCACAF League was an international association football competition organized by CONCACAF as its secondary continental tournament for clubs from North America, Central America and the Caribbean. It was announced on 8 May 2017.

The competition used a knockout cup format with each round having two legs. The top six teams proceeded to the CONCACAF Champions League. From 2019 to 2022 the tournament featured 22 teams, an increase from 16 in the 2017 and 2018 editions.

The competition ended after the 2022 edition due to the expansion of the CONCACAF Champions League, (renamed to Champions Cup) starting with the 2024 edition. Two regional competitions – the Central American Cup and the Caribbean Cup – were created as qualifying competitions to the CONCACAF Champions Cup.

== Qualification ==
Since the 2019 edition, a total of 22 teams participated in the CONCACAF League: 18 from Central America (from 7 associations), 3 from the Caribbean (from 2 or 3 associations), and 1 from North America (from 1 association).

18 from the Central American Zone:

3 clubs from Costa Rica
3 clubs from El Salvador
3 clubs from Guatemala
3 clubs from Honduras
3 clubs from Panama
2 clubs from Nicaragua
1 club from Belize

3 from the Caribbean Zone:

2 clubs from the Caribbean Club Championship (runner-up, third place)
Caribbean Club Championship fourth place vs. Caribbean Club Shield winner playoff

1 from the North American Zone:

1 club from Canada

== Results ==
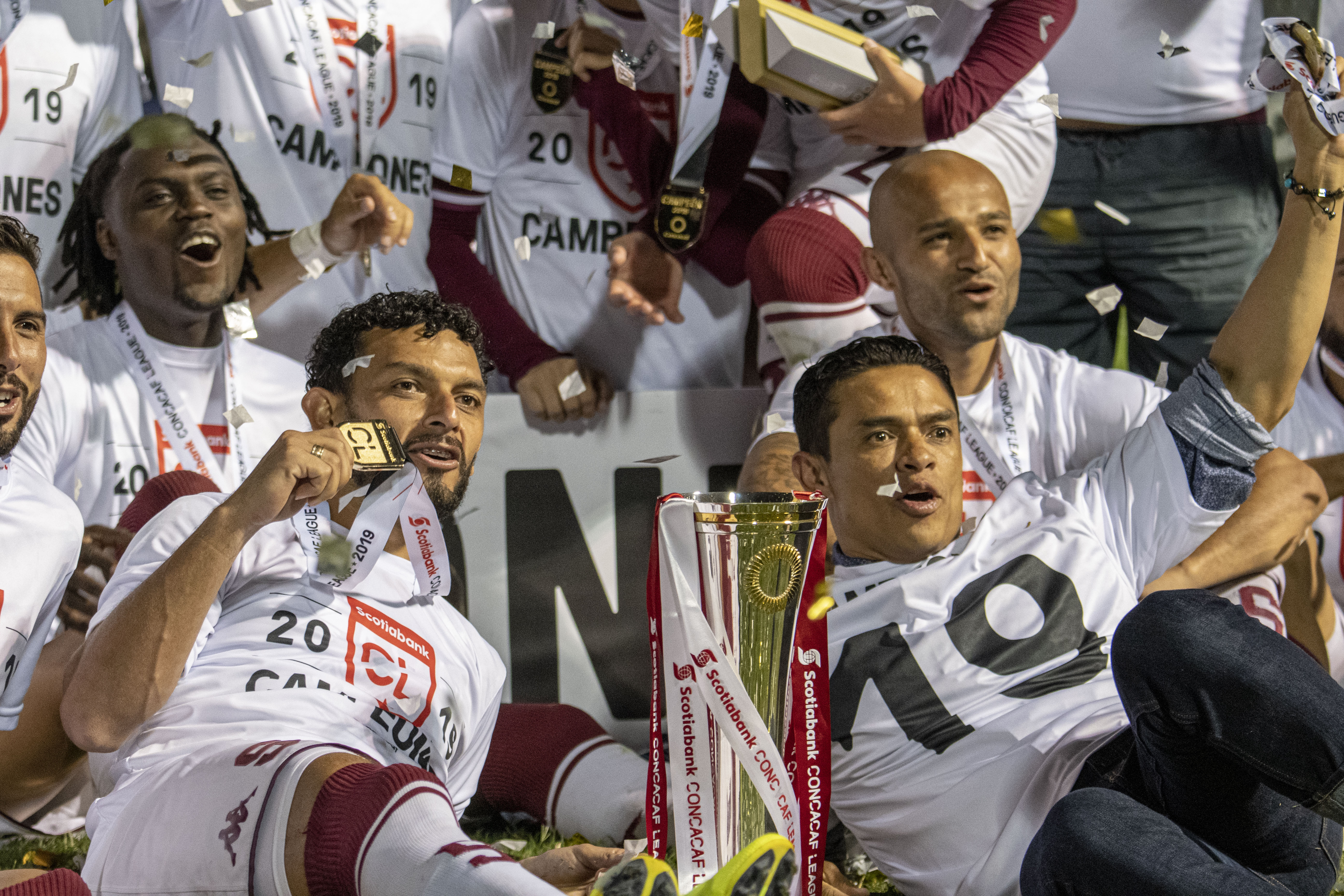
Deportivo Saprissa celebrating winning the 2019 CONCACAF League

Year	Champions	Results	Runners-up	Venue
2017	(Honduras) Olimpia	0–1	(Costa Rica) Santos de Guápiles	(Honduras) Estadio Olímpico Metropolitano, San Pedro Sula
2017	(Honduras) Olimpia	1–0 (4–1 p)	(Costa Rica) Santos de Guápiles	Estadio Nacional de Costa Rica, San José
2018	(Costa Rica) Herediano	2–0	(Honduras) Motagua	(Costa Rica) Estadio Eladio Rosabal Cordero, Heredia
2018	(Costa Rica) Herediano	1–2	(Honduras) Motagua	(Honduras) Estadio Tiburcio Carías Andino, Tegucigalpa
2019	(Costa Rica) Saprissa	1–0	(Honduras) Motagua	(Costa Rica) Estadio Ricardo Saprissa Aymá, San José
2019	(Costa Rica) Saprissa	0–0	(Honduras) Motagua	(Honduras) Estadio Tiburcio Carías Andino, Tegucigalpa
2020	(Costa Rica) Alajuelense	3–2	(Costa Rica) Saprissa	(Costa Rica) Estadio Alejandro Morera Soto, Alajuela
2021	(Guatemala) Comunicaciones	2–1	(Honduras) Motagua	(Honduras) Estadio Tiburcio Carías Andino, Tegucigalpa
2021	(Guatemala) Comunicaciones	4–2	(Honduras) Motagua	Estadio Doroteo Guamuch Flores, Guatemala City
2022	(Honduras) Olimpia	3–2	(Costa Rica) Alajuelense	(Honduras) Estadio Nacional Chelato Uclés, Tegucigalpa
2022	(Honduras) Olimpia	2–2	(Costa Rica) Alajuelense	(Costa Rica) Estadio Alejandro Morera Soto, Alajuela

== Performances ==
Performance by club
Club	Titles	Runners-up	Years won	Years runners-up
(Honduras) Olimpia	2	0	2017, 2022	–
(Costa Rica) Saprissa	1	1	2019	2020
(Costa Rica) Alajuelense	1	1	2020	2022
(Costa Rica) Herediano	1	0	2018	–
(Guatemala) Comunicaciones	1	0	2021	–
(Honduras) Motagua	0	3	–	2018, 2019, 2021
(Costa Rica) Santos de Guápiles	0	1	–	2017

Performance by nation
Nation	Titles	Runners-up	Total
Costa Rica	3	3	6
Honduras	2	3	5
Guatemala	1	0	1

== See also ==
- CONCACAF Champions Cup
- CONCACAF Cup Winners Cup
- CONCACAF Giants Cup
