= Jimmy Marín =

Costa Rican footballer (born 1997)

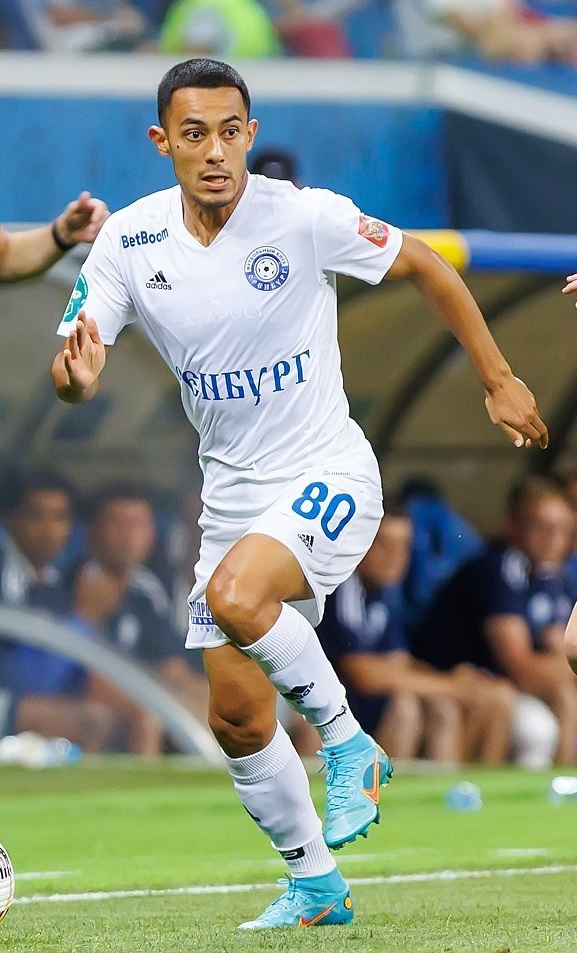
- Marín with Orenburg in 2022

Personal information
- Full name: Jimmy Marín Vílchez
- Date of birth: 8 October 1997 (age 29)
- Place of birth: San José, Costa Rica
- Height: 1.70 m (5 ft 7 in)
- Positions: Wide midfielder; winger

Team information
- Current team: Krylia Sovetov Samara
- Number: 26

Youth career
- Liga Deportiva Alajuelense

Senior career*
| Years | Team | Apps | (Gls) |
| 2015–2016 | Saprissa | 3 | (1) |
| 2016–2019 | Herediano | 71 | (10) |
| 2016 | → Belén (loan) | 15 | (1) |
| 2019–2020 | Hapoel Be'er Sheva | 13 | (1) |
| 2020 | → Ashdod (loan) | 3 | (1) |
| 2020–2022 | Saprissa | 82 | (22) |
| 2022–2025 | Orenburg | 75 | (14) |
| 2025– | Krylia Sovetov Samara | 21 | (1) |

International career^{‡}
| 2017 | Costa Rica U20 | | |
| 2018 | Costa Rica U21 | | |
| 2021 | Costa Rica U23 | 3 | (0) |
| 2018– | Costa Rica | 13 | (1) |
- * Club domestic league appearances and goals as of 10 May 2026 ‡ National team caps and goals as of 8 September 2021

Jimmy Marín Vílchez (born 8 October 1997) is a Costa Rican professional footballer who plays as a midfielder for Russian club Krylia Sovetov Samara and the Costa Rica national team. He is used as a wide midfielder or winger, on left or the right flanks.

== Club career ==
Born in San José, Costa Rica, Marín started his senior professional career with Deportivo Saprissa in 2015. On 6 May 2015, he made his first team debut in a 3–2 victory against Carmelita. On 23 August, he scored his first goal for the club in a 1–0 victory against Pérez Zeledón. He played no further in the league, with his side going on to win it on 23 December.

On 18 May 2016, Marín moved to Herediano on a three-year contract and was immediately loaned out to Belén. On 31 October 2016, he scored his debut goal for the club in a 3–2 triumph over UCR.

Marín made his debut for Herediano on 9 January 2017, finding the net in a 2–0 victory over Pérez Zeledón.

On 2 July 2022, Marín signed with Orenburg in Russia. Marín left Orenburg on 7 June 2025 as his contract expired.

On 11 July 2025, Marín joined Krylia Sovetov Samara on a three-season deal.

== International career ==
=== Youth ===
Marín has been capped by Costa Rica at under-20 level, representing the side at 2017 CONCACAF U-20 Championship. He was also selected by manager Marcelo Herrera in the under-20 team for the 2017 FIFA U-20 World Cup. On 7 July 2018, he was included in the under-21 team for the Central American and Caribbean Games.

=== Senior ===
On 16 June 2017, Marín was included in the provisional 26-man squad for the CONCACAF Gold Cup. However, he was omitted from the final 23-man squad. On 15 July, he was recalled to the senior team for the same competition as an injury replacement.

On 28 August 2018, Marín was called to the team as a part of a generational of new footballers for friendlies against South Korea and Japan. On 7 September, he made his debut, starting in a 2–0 defeat against Japan.

== Career statistics ==
=== Club ===
As of match played 14 October 2026

Appearances and goals by club, season and competition
| Club | Season | League | | | Cup | | Continental | | Other | | Total | |
| Club | Season | Division | Apps | Goals | Apps | Goals | Apps | Goals | Apps | Goals | Apps | Goals |
|---|---|---|---|---|---|---|---|---|---|---|---|---|
| Saprissa | 2014–15 | Liga FPD | 1 | 0 | — | | — | | — | | 1 | 0 |
| Saprissa | 2015–16 | Liga FPD | 2 | 1 | — | | — | | — | | 2 | 1 |
| Belén | 2016–17 | Liga FPD | 15 | 1 | — | | — | | — | | 15 | 1 |
| Herediano | 2016–17 | Liga FPD | 8 | 1 | — | | — | | — | | 8 | 1 |
| Herediano | 2017–18 | Liga FPD | 31 | 3 | — | | — | | — | | 31 | 3 |
| Herediano | 2018–19 | Liga FPD | 32 | 6 | — | | 8 (Note: Six appearances, three goals in the CONCACAF League, two appearances in the CONCACAF Champions League) | 3 | — | | 40 | 9 |
| Herediano | Total | | 71 | 10 | 0 | 0 | 8 | 3 | 0 | 0 | 79 | 13 |
| Hapoel Be'er Sheva | 2019–20 | Israeli Premier League | 13 | 1 | — | | 8 (Note: Appearances in the UEFA Europa League) | 0 | 2 (Note: Appearances in the Toto Cup) | 0 | 23 | 1 |
| Ashdod | 2019–20 | Israeli Premier League | 3 | 1 | — | | — | | — | | 3 | 1 |
| Saprissa | 2020–21 | Liga FPD | 40 | 8 | — | | 6 (Note: Four appearances, one goal in the CONCACAF League, two appearances in the CONCACAF Champions League) | 1 | 1 (Note: Appearance in the Supercopa de Costa Rica) | 0 | 47 | 9 |
| Saprissa | 2021–22 | Liga FPD | 42 | 14 | — | | 6 (Note: Four appearances in the CONCACAF League, two appearances in the CONCACAF Champions League) | 0 | — | | 48 | 14 |
| Saprissa | Total | | 85 | 23 | 0 | 0 | 12 | 1 | 1 | 0 | 98 | 24 |
| Orenburg | 2022–23 | Russian Premier League | 25 | 7 | 1 | 0 | — | | — | | 26 | 7 |
| Orenburg | 2023–24 | Russian Premier League | 27 | 3 | 10 | 1 | — | | — | | 37 | 4 |
| Orenburg | 2024–25 | Russian Premier League | 23 | 4 | 3 | 1 | — | | — | | 26 | 5 |
| Orenburg | Total | | 75 | 14 | 14 | 2 | — | | — | | 89 | 16 |
| Krylia Sovetov Samara | 2025–26 | Russian Premier League | 21 | 1 | 6 | 1 | — | | — | | 27 | 2 |
| Krylia Sovetov Samara | 2026–27 | Russian Premier League | 0 | 0 | 3 | 0 | — | | — | | 3 | 0 |
| Krylia Sovetov Samara | Total | | 21 | 1 | 9 | 1 | 0 | 0 | 0 | 0 | 30 | 2 |
| Career total | | | 283 | 51 | 23 | 3 | 28 | 4 | 3 | 0 | 337 | 58 |

=== International ===
As of match played 8 September 2021

Appearances and goals by national team and year
| National team | Year | Apps | Goals |
|---|---|---|---|
| Costa Rica | 2018 | 5 | 0 |
| Costa Rica | 2021 | 4 | 1 |
| Total | | 9 | 1 |

==== International goals ====
Scores and results list Costa Rica's goal tally first.

List of international goals scored by Jimmy Marín
| No. | Date | Venue | Opponent | Score | Result | Competition |
|---|---|---|---|---|---|---|
| 1 | 8 September 2021 | Estadio Nacional, San José, Costa Rica | Jamaica | 1–0 | 1–1 | 2022 FIFA World Cup qualification |

== Honours ==
Saprissa

- Liga FPD: Apertura 2015, Clausura 2021

Herediano

- Liga FPD: Clausura 2017, Apertura 2018
- CONCACAF League: 2018

Individual

- CONCACAF League Best Young Player: 2018
