= 2018–19 Liga FPD =

Liga FPD
- Season: 2018–19
- Champions: Apertura: Herediano (27th title); Clausura: San Carlos (1st title)
- Relegated: Carmelita
- CONCACAF League: San Carlos; Herediano; Saprissa
- Top goalscorer: Marcel Hernández (15 goals)
- Biggest home win: Alajuelense 6–1 Herediano (9 September 2018)
- Biggest away win: Grecia 0–5 Saprissa (28 April 2019)
- Highest scoring: Herediano 6–2 Limón (11 November 2018)
- All statistics correct as of 11 November 2018.

The 2018–19 Liga FPD season, also known as Campeonato Banco Popular for sponsorship reasons, is the 98th since its establishment. The tournament is the second since the 2006–07 season to use the Apertura and Clausura names to their short tournaments, marking a departure from the Invierno and Verano tournaments.

The Voit Lummo is the official match ball of the tournament. Deportivo Saprissa are the defending champions, after defeating Herediano in the Clausura 2018 tournament.

== Teams and Structure Changes ==
A total of 12 teams will contest the league, including 11 sides from the 2017–18 season, one team promoted from the Liga de Ascenso.

San Carlos were promoted for the first time to the Liga FPD after defeating Jicaral in the Liga de Ascenso final, thus replacing Liberia in the Liga FPD.

For this season, the league has changed the playoff format. The top 4 teams in the regular season will progress to a two-legged knockout tournament. If the same team that wins the regular season wins the playoff, that team wins the season championship immediately. Should a different team win the playoff than won the regular season, those two teams will meet in a two-legged Grand Final for the season championship.

=== Personnel, kits and Stadia ===
Locations of the 2018–19 Costa Rican FPD teams

Note: Table lists in alphabetical order.

Team	Manager	Kit manufacturer	Shirt sponsor(s)	Stadium	Capacity
Alajuelense	(Costa Rica) Luis Diego Arnáez	Kelme	Claro	Alejandro Morera Soto	18,000
Carmelita	(Costa Rica) Mario Víquez	Monarca	Almacenes Decavisa	Estadio Rafael Bolaños	4,500
Cartaginés	(Uruguay) Martin Arriola	Joma	Bancrédito	"Fello" Meza	13,500
Municipal Grecia	(Costa Rica) Walter Centeno	Living Sports	Super Rosvil	Estadio Allen Riggioni	3,000
Guadalupe F.C.	(Costa Rica) Geiner Segura	Pirma	Papa John's Pizza	Estadio José Joaquín "Coyella" Fonseca	4,500
Herediano	(Colombia) Jaime de la Pava	Umbro	kölbi	Eladio Rosabal Cordero	8,721
Limón	(Costa Rica) Ricardo Allen Thomas	Sportek	APM Terminals	Estadio Juan Gobán	3,000
Pérez Zeledón	(Argentina) José Giacone	Textiles JB	kölbi	Municipal de Pérez Zeledón	6,000
San Carlos	(Argentina) Martin Cardetti	ARN	Dos Pinos	Estadio Carlos Ugalde Álvarez	5,600
Santos	(Costa Rica) Johnny Chaves	Capelli Sport	Grupo Colono	Ebal Rodríguez	3,000
Saprissa	(Costa Rica) Vladimir Quesada	Kappa	Bimbo, Ibérico	Ricardo Saprissa	23,000
UCR	(Costa Rica) Minor Díaz	Saeta	TBD	Estadio Jorge Hernán "Cuty" Monge	5,500

== Managerial changes ==
=== Before the start of the season ===
Team	Outgoing manager	Manner of departure	Date of vacancy	Replaced by	Date of appointment	Position in table
CF Universidad de Costa Rica	(Costa Rica) TBD	Resigned	June 2018	(Colombia) Octavio Bermúdez	July 2018	TBD (2017–2018)
Herediano	(Costa Rica) TBD	Resigned	June 2018	(Colombia) Jaime de la Pava	July 2018	TBD (2017–2018)
Cartaginés	(Costa Rica) TBD	Resigned	June 2018	(Costa Rica) Paulo Wanchope	July 2018	TBD (2017–2018)

=== During the Apertura season ===
Team	Outgoing manager	Manner of departure	Date of vacancy	Replaced by	Date of appointment	Position in table
Limón F.C.	(Costa Rica) Horacio Esquivel	Resigned	September 2018	(Costa Rica) Ricardo Allen Thomas	September 2018	12th (Apertura 2018)
Herediano	(Colombia) Jaime de la Pava	Sacked	September 2018	(Costa Rica) Jafet Soto	September 2018	th (Apertura 2018)
C.S. Cartaginés	(Costa Rica) Paulo Wanchope	Resigned	September 2018	(Uruguay) Martin Arriola	September 2018	th (Apertura 2018)
Limón F.C.	(Costa Rica) Ricardo Allen Thomas	Moved to assistant coach	September 2018	(Costa Rica) Marvin Solano	September 2018	th (Apertura 2018)
UCR	(Colombia) Octavio Bermúdez	Sacked	October 2018	(Costa Rica) Minor Díaz	October 2018	12th (Apertura 2018)
Herediano	(Costa Rica) Jafet Soto	Sacked	October 2018	(Costa Rica) Paulo Wanchope	October 2018	th (Apertura 2018)
Carmelita	(Costa Rica) Mario Víquez	Sacked	October 2018	(Costa Rica) Luis José Herra y Luis Carlos Mejías	October 2018	th (Apertura 2018)

=== Between the Apertura and Clausura season ===
Team	Outgoing manager	Manner of departure	Date of vacancy	Replaced by	Date of appointment	Position in table
Herediano	(Costa Rica) Jafet Soto	Sacked	December 2018	(Costa Rica) Hernan Medford	December 2018	12th (Apertura 2018)

=== During the Clausura season ===
Team	Outgoing manager	Manner of departure	Date of vacancy	Replaced by	Date of appointment	Position in table
San Carlos	(Argentina) Martin Cardetti	Sacked	January 2019	(Costa Rica) Luis Marin	January 2019	th (Apertura 2018)
Alajuelense	(Costa Rica) Luis Diego Arnáez	Sacked	January 2019	(Colombia) Hernán Torres	January 2019	th (Apertura 2018)
Herediano	(Costa Rica) Hernan Medford	Sacked	March 2019	(Costa Rica) Jafet Soto	March 2019	th (Apertura 2018)
Limon	(Costa Rica) Marvin Solano	Sacked	February 2019	(Costa Rica) Ricardo Allen	February 2019	th (Apertura 2018)

== Apertura ==
The Apertura tournament will be played in the second half of 2018, starting on 21 July.

=== Regular season ===
The regular season began on 21 July 2018 and ended on 11 November 2018.

On 17 October 2018, the match between Limón and Grecia was suspended in the 25th minute due to a waterlogged pitch. The remaining 65 minutes were played the next day.

==== Standings ====
Pos	Team	Pld	W	D	L	GF	GA	GD	Pts	Qualification or relegation
1	Saprissa	22	14	6	2	45	17	+28	48	Advance to Playoffs and (if necessary) Grand final
2	Alajuelense	22	16	0	6	44	22	+22	48	Advance to Playoffs
3	San Carlos	22	11	5	6	38	29	+9	38	Advance to Playoffs
4	Herediano	22	11	5	6	35	26	+9	38	Advance to Playoffs
5	Pérez Zeledón	22	10	7	5	31	24	+7	37	
6	Cartaginés	22	8	8	6	40	34	+6	32	
7	Santos de Guápiles	22	7	4	11	26	29	−3	25	
8	Carmelita	22	6	6	10	31	40	−9	24	
9	Grecia	22	7	3	12	27	36	−9	24	
10	Guadalupe	22	6	5	11	25	40	−15	23	
11	Limón	22	5	5	12	27	43	−16	20	
12	UCR	22	2	4	16	23	52	−29	10	

Source: Soccerway
Rules for classification: 1) points; 2) goal difference; 3) goals scored; 4) head-to-head points; 5) head-to-head goal difference; 6) head-to-head goals scored; 7) draw

==== Results ====
Home \ Away	ALA	CARM	CART	GRE	GUA	HER	LIM	PER	SCA	SNT	SAP	UCR
Alajuelense	—	2–3	2–1	2–0	3–1	6–1	1–0	1–2	2–1	1–0	1–0	5–1
Carmelita	0–1	—	1–1	1–2	3–0	0–0	2–1	1–1	2–4	0–3	2–2	3–2
Cartaginés	2–3	3–2	—	2–3	5–1	3–2	3–0	3–0	1–1	4–3	0–1	2–2
Grecia	1–4	2–0	1–1	—	2–0	2–0	1–2	1–2	1–0	1–1	1–3	2–1
Guadalupe	0–2	2–1	1–1	1–1	—	2–2	3–1	1–1	2–3	2–1	0–2	1–0
Herediano	1–0	2–0	0–0	4–2	2–1	—	6–2	0–1	1–0	3–0	2–0	4–0
Limón	0–1	1–1	1–3	2–1	5–2	3–0	—	0–3	1–2	0–2	1–1	3–1
Pérez Zeledón	3–1	2–2	1–1	2–1	0–1	1–1	1–1	—	2–1	2–1	0–2	2–0
San Carlos	2–1	1–2	1–1	2–1	2–1	1–2	2–0	2–1	—	2–2	2–2	2–0
Santos de Guápiles	0–2	2–1	3–0	2–0	0–2	0–1	1–1	1–0	0–2	—	0–0	2–1
Saprissa	2–1	3–0	4–1	1–0	2–0	1–0	4–0	2–2	3–3	2–1	—	4–0
UCR	1–2	3–4	1–2	3–1	1–1	1–1	2–2	0–2	1–2	2–1	0–4	—

Source: Soccerway
Legend: Blue = home team win; Yellow = draw; Red = away team win.
For upcoming matches, an "a" indicates there is an article about the rivalry between the two participants.

=== Playoffs ===
Semifinals
1	Saprissa	0	1	1 (2)
4	Herediano	1	0	1 (4)
2	Alajuelense	1	1	2 (3)
3	San Carlos	1	1	2 (1)

Finals
4	Herediano	2	1	3 (4)
2	Alajuelense	1	2	3 (2)

==== Semifinals ====
===== First legs =====
24 November 2018
19:55 (UTC-6)

Herediano	1–0	Saprissa
H. Saravia 21'

Estadio Eladio Rosabal Cordero
Referee: Adrian Elizondo
25 November 2018
18:00 (UTC-6)

San Carlos	1–1	Alajuelense
J. McDonald 38' (pen.)		54' Á. Saborío

Estadio Carlos Ugalde Álvarez
Referee: Christian Rodríguez

===== Second legs =====
28 November 2018
20:00 (UTC-6)

Saprissa	1–0 (a.e.t.)	Herediano
J. Venegas 33'
Penalties
	2–4

Estadio Ricardo Saprissa Aymá
Referee: Pedro Navarro
28 November 2018
20:05 (UTC-6)

Alajuelense	1–1	San Carlos
A. López 55'		Goal
Penalties
	3–1

Estadio Alejandro Morera Soto
Referee: Geiner Zuñiga

==== Finals ====
===== First leg =====
2 December 2018
18:00 (UTC-6)

Herediano	2–1	Alajuelense
Y. Ruiz 60' (pen.) 75'		88' M. Foster

Estadio Eladio Rosabal Cordero
Referee: Keylor Herrera

===== Second leg =====
10 December 2018
11:00 (UTC-6)

Alajuelense	2–1	Herediano
Jonathan Mcdonald 28'; Jonathan Moya 72'		Allan Cruz 60'
Penalties
Roger Rojas (penalty scored); Freddy Álvarez (penalty missed); Jonathan McDonald (penalty missed); Kenner Gutiérrez (penalty scored)	2–4	Randall Azofeifa (penalty scored); Pablo Salazar (penalty scored); Gerardo Lugo (penalty scored); Antonio Pedroza (penalty scored)

Estadio Alejandro Morera Soto
Referee: Christian Rodriguez

=== Grand final ===
If the regular season winners are unable to win the playoffs, a double-legged final will be played against the playoffs winner in order to determine the champions of the Apertura tournament. The team with the better accumulated record over the regular season and playoffs will host the second leg.

==== First leg ====
16 December 2018
(UTC-6)

Herediano	2–2	Saprissa
Ó. Granados 40'; A. Magaña 78'		69' J. Venegas; 87' A. Cabral

Estadio Eladio Rosabal Cordero
Referee: Adrian Elizondo

==== Second leg ====
23 December 2018
(UTC-6)

Saprissa	2–3 (a.e.t.)	Herediano
O. Arellano 36' (o.g.); J. Venegas 66'		47' J. Marín; 70' C. Reyes; 112' A. Magaña

Estadio Ricardo Saprissa Aymá
Referee: Pedro Navarro

Apertura 2018 champions

27th title

== Clausura ==
=== Regular season ===
The regular season began on 12 January 2019 and will end of 28 April 2019.

==== Standings ====
Pos	Team	Pld	W	D	L	GF	GA	GD	Pts	Qualification or relegation
1	San Carlos	22	11	6	5	36	20	+16	39	Advance to Playoffs and (if necessary) Grand final
2	Saprissa	22	11	5	6	41	27	+14	38	Advance to Playoffs
3	Pérez Zeledón	22	9	10	3	35	27	+8	37	Advance to Playoffs
4	Herediano	22	9	7	6	31	24	+7	34	Advance to Playoffs
5	Cartaginés	22	9	7	6	34	28	+6	34	
6	Alajuelense	22	8	8	6	33	27	+6	32	
7	Grecia	22	8	7	7	32	32	0	31	
8	UCR	22	8	7	7	35	38	−3	31	
9	Santos de Guápiles	22	8	3	11	33	39	−6	27	
10	Limón	22	7	5	10	22	32	−10	26	
11	Guadalupe	22	4	6	12	20	37	−17	18	
12	Carmelita	22	2	5	15	19	40	−21	11	

Source: Soccerway
Rules for classification: 1) points; 2) goal difference; 3) goals scored; 4) head-to-head points; 5) head-to-head goal difference; 6) head-to-head goals scored; 7) draw

==== Results ====
Home \ Away	ALA	CARM	CART	GRE	GUA	HER	LIM	PER	SCA	SNT	SAP	UCR
Alajuelense	—	1–0	2–2	1–0	3–0	2–2	1–0	1–2	0–1	0–1	1–1	3–3
Carmelita	1–1	—	0–3	0–1	4–1	0–3	2–0	2–4	1–3	2–2	0–1	1–1
Cartaginés	2–4	2–1	—	1–1	2–3	2–1	1–0	1–1	0–0	2–1	2–0	2–2
Grecia	1–0	1–1	0–1	—	2–2	1–2	0–0	2–2	2–1	5–0	0–5	2–0
Guadalupe	0–3	1–1	0–3	1–2	—	0–0	1–1	0–1	1–2	2–0	0–2	1–4
Herediano	2–0	1–0	2–1	2–3	1–0	—	2–1	0–0	1–1	3–2	2–0	1–2
Limón	1–1	2–0	1–0	0–2	1–1	1–0	—	3–1	1–0	2–1	2–1	1–2
Pérez Zeledón	2–4	2–1	0–0	2–2	2–1	1–1	3–0	—	1–0	1–1	2–3	3–1
San Carlos	3–0	1–0	2–0	2–2	0–0	3–2	5–1	2–2	—	1–0	0–2	3–1
Santos de Guápiles	1–3	2–0	2–1	3–0	1–2	1–1	4–2	0–1	1–5	—	5–3	2–1
Saprissa	0–0	4–1	1–2	4–2	1–3	2–1	2–2	1–1	1–1	1–0	—	4–0
UCR	2–2	3–1	4–4	2–1	1–0	1–1	2–0	1–1	1–0	1–3	0–2	—

Source: Soccerway
Legend: Blue = home team win; Yellow = draw; Red = away team win.
For upcoming matches, an "a" indicates there is an article about the rivalry between the two participants.

=== Playoffs ===
Semifinals
1	San Carlos	0	4	4
4	Herediano	2	1	3
2	Saprissa	1	2	3
3	Pérez Zeledón	1	1	2

Finals
1	San Carlos	1	0	1 (a)
2	Saprissa	1	0	1

==== Semifinals ====
===== First legs =====
4 May 2019
20:00 (UTC-6)

Herediano	2–0	San Carlos
J. Marín 47'; J. Ortiz 59'

Estadio Eladio Rosabal Cordero
Referee: Pedro Navarro
5 May 2019
15:00 (UTC-6)

Pérez Zeledón	1–1	Saprissa
L. Cazal 10'		45+2' C. Bolaños

Estadio Municipal Pérez Zeledón
Referee: Adrian Chinchilla

===== Second legs =====
8 May 2019
20:00 (UTC-6)

San Carlos	4–1	Herediano
Á. Saborío 9'; R. Chirino 26'; L. Días 64' (o.g.); P. Leal 84'		24' J. Ortiz

Estadio Carlos Ugalde Álvarez
Referee: Christian Rodríguez

San Carlos progress 4–3 on aggregate.

8 May 2019
20:00 (UTC-6)

Saprissa	2–1	Pérez Zeledón
M. Torres 21'; M. Barrantes 75'		24' J. Sánchez

Estadio Ricardo Saprissa Aymá
Referee: Adrián Elizondo

Saprissa progress 3–2 on aggregate.

==== Finals ====
===== First leg =====
12 May 2019
16:00 (UTC-6)

Saprissa	1–1	San Carlos
R. Castillo 64'		42' M. Mena

Estadio Ricardo Saprissa Aymá
Referee: Adrian Chinchilla

===== Second leg =====
15 May 2019
20:00 (UTC-6)

San Carlos	0–0	Saprissa

Estadio Carlos Ugalde Álvarez
Referee: Christian Rodríguez

1–1 on aggregate. San Carlos wins 1–0 on away goals.

=== Grand final ===
If the regular season winners are unable to win the playoffs, a double-legged final will be played against the playoffs winner in order to determine the champions of the Clausura tournament. The team with the better accumulated record over the regular season and playoffs will host the second leg. For this tournament, San Carlos won both the regular season and playoffs, so they were declared champions without a grand final.

Clausura 2019 champions

1st title

== Aggregate table ==
Pos	Team	Pld	W	D	L	GF	GA	GD	Pts	Qualification or relegation
1	Saprissa (Q)	44	25	11	8	86	44	+42	86	CONCACAF League preliminary round (Note: As non-champions with best aggregate record (CRC3))
2	Alajuelense	44	24	8	12	77	49	+28	80	
3	San Carlos (Q)	44	22	11	11	74	49	+25	77	CONCACAF League round of 16 (Note: As Clausura champions (CRC1))
4	Pérez Zeledón	44	19	17	8	66	51	+15	74	
5	Herediano (Q)	44	20	12	12	66	50	+16	72	CONCACAF League round of 16 (Note: As Apertura champions (CRC2))
6	Cartaginés	44	17	15	12	74	62	+12	66	
7	Grecia	44	15	10	19	59	68	−9	55	
8	Santos de Guápiles	44	15	7	22	59	68	−9	52	
9	Limón	44	12	10	22	49	75	−26	46	
10	UCR	44	10	11	23	58	90	−32	41	
11	Guadalupe	44	10	11	23	45	77	−32	41	
12	Carmelita (R)	44	8	11	25	50	80	−30	35	Relegated to Liga de Ascenso

Source: Soccerway Soccerway
Rules for classification: 1) points; 2) goal difference; 3) goals scored; 4) head-to-head points; 5) head-to-head goal difference; 6) head-to-head goals scored; 7) draw
(Q) Qualified for the phase indicated; (R) Relegated

== List of foreign players in the league ==
This is a list of foreign players in the 2018–19 season. The following players:

1. Have played at least one game for the respective club.
2. Have not been capped for the Costa Rica national football team on any level, independently from the birthplace

A new rule was introduced this season, that clubs can have four foreign players per club and can only add a new player if there is an injury or a player is released and it's before the close of the season transfer window.

Alajuelense

- (Panama) Abdiel Arroyo
- (Honduras) Alexander López
- (Honduras) Luis Garrido
- (Honduras) Roger Rojas
- (Honduras) Henry Figueroa
- (Jamaica) Maalique Foster
- (Argentina) Facundo Zabala

Carmelita

- (Panama) Amir Waithe
- (Argentina) Jonathan Camio

Cartaginés

- (Argentina) Hernán Fener
- (Panama) Nelson Barahona
- (Mexico) Julio Cruz González
- (Mexico) Juan Felipe Delgadillo
- (Cuba) Marcel Hernández Campanioni

Grecia

- (Brazil) Paulo Cézar
- (Nicaragua) Byron Bonilla
- (Venezuela) Víctor Pérez
- (Argentina) Lucas Giovagnoli

Herdiano

- (Mexico) Aldo Magaña
- (Mexico) Omar Arellano
- (Mexico) Édgar Gerardo Lugo
- (England) Antonio Pedroza

Guadalupe

- (Argentina) Lautaro Ayala
- (Colombia) Sebastián González
- (Mexico) Alejandro Abasolo
- (Mexico) Moisés Arce

Limón

- (Colombia) Carlos Palacios
- (Colombia) Ronald Benavides
- (Colombia) Junior Murillo
- (Panama) Richard Dixon
- (Panama) Humberto Ward
- (United States) Javier Clavijo

Pérez Zeledón

- (Argentina) Leandro Gastón Rodríguez
- (Argentina) Javier Liendo
- (Argentina) Pablo Azcurra
- (Paraguay) Lauro Cazal
- (Argentina) Lucio Barroca

San Carlos

- (Argentina) Manuel González
- (Argentina) Ismael Gómez
- (Uruguay) Fabrizio Ronchetti
- (Uruguay) Jonathan Soto
- (Argentina) Claudio Daniel Pérez

Santos de Guápiles

- (Nicaragua) Francisco Flores
- (Panama) Victor Griffith
- (Panama) Ronaldo Dinolis
- (Uruguay) Fabrizio Ronchetti

Deportivo Saprissa

- (Argentina) Mariano Torres
- (Argentina) Alejandro Cabral
- (Brazil) Tássio Maia
- (Trinidad and Tobago) Aubrey David
- (Honduras) Rubilio Castillo

Universidad

- (Colombia) Andres Riascos
- (Colombia) Jhon Ibargüen
- (Colombia) Fernando Cárdenas
- (Colombia) Daniel Ocampo
- (Colombia) Sebastián Bermúdez
- (France) Román Calvo
- (Paraguay) Luis Rodríguez

(player released during the Apertura season) (player released between the Apertura and Clausura seasons) (player released during the Clausura season)
