= 2017–18 Liga FPD =

Liga FPD
- Season: 2017–18
- Dates: Apertura 2017: 29 July – 23 December; Clausura 2018: 7 January – 20 May
- Champions: Apertura: Pérez Zeledón (1st title); Clausura: Saprissa (34th title)
- Champions League: Saprissa
- CONCACAF League: Pérez Zeledón; Herediano; Santos de Guápiles
- Matches: 146
- Goals: 426 (2.92 per match)
- Top goalscorer: Jonathan McDonald (15 goals)
- Biggest home win: Saprissa 6–1 Grecia (3/4 September 2017); Santos 5–0 Grecia (29 October 2017); Herediano 5–0 UCR (1 November 2017)
- Biggest away win: Guadalupe 0–4 Santos (15 October 2017); Cartaginés 2–6 Carmelita (25 October 2017); Liberia 1–5 Saprissa (19 November 2017)
- Highest scoring: Cartaginés 2–6 Carmelita (25 October 2017)
- Longest winning run: 5 matches Herediano (Two times)
- Longest unbeaten run: 22 matches Herediano
- Longest winless run: 8 matches Guadalupe; UCR (Two times)
- Longest losing run: 6 matches Alajuelense; Guadalupe; Liberia
- Highest attendance: 17,037; Saprissa 2–0 Alajuelense (29 October 2017)
- Lowest attendance: 210; Santos 4–0 Pérez Zeledón (30 July 2017)
- Total attendance: 388,793

The 2017–18 Liga FPD season, also known as Campeonato Banco Popular for sponsorship reasons, is the 97th since its establishment. The tournament is the first since the 2006–07 season to use the Apertura and Clausura names to their short tournaments, marking a departure from the Invierno and Verano tournaments.

The Voit Lummo is the official match ball of the tournament. Herediano entered as the defending champions, but lost the title in the Apertura finals to Pérez Zeledón.

== Teams ==
Twelve teams contested for the league title; ten sides from the 2016–17 season, one team promoted from the Liga de Ascenso and a newly formed team.

Grecia were promoted for their debut in the Liga FPD after defeating Jicaral in the Liga de Ascenso final, thus replacing San Carlos in the Liga FPD.

Guadalupe is a newly established team that take over the previous franchise of Belén. UNAFUT authorized the name change just two days before the beginning of the season.

On 2 June 2017 Henning Jensen, rector of the University of Costa Rica, announced the cease of the agreement between the university and its homonymous club, citing that the transfer of the administrative management of the team to the Colombian company Con Talla Mundial was neither requested nor advised to the university. Jensen also stated that the club did not comply with the correction in the financial part of the club. On 19 June 2017, Con Talla Mundial announced that the club will now be under the name "Universitarios FC". The administration of the team had revealed the team badge and their intentions to use the Estadio Nacional as their home stadium. However, the Asociación Filial Club de Fútbol UCR, which holds the rights of the team within the league, sued the University because of their cease of the agreement. The club then retains its original name and is due to return to the Estadio Ecológico.

=== Stadia and locations ===
Alajuelense	Carmelita	Cartaginés	Grecia	Guadalupe	Herediano
Alejandro Morera Soto		"Fello" Meza	Allen Riggioni	"Coyella" Fonseca	Eladio Rosabal Cordero
Capacity: 18,000		Capacity: 13,500	Capacity: 4,000	Capacity: 4,500	Capacity: 8,500
Liberia	Limón	Pérez Zeledón	Santos de Guápiles	Saprissa	UCR
Edgardo Baltodano	Juan Gobán	Estadio Municipal	Ebal Rodríguez	Ricardo Saprissa	Estadio Ecológico
Capacity: 5,979	Capacity: 3,000	Capacity: 6,000	Capacity: 3,000	Capacity: 23,112	Capacity: 1,800

Locations of the 2014-15 Costa Rican FPD teams

== Torneo Apertura ==
The Apertura tournament will be played in the second half of 2017, starting on 29 July and, given the possibility of a final, ending on 23 December. The tournament is dedicated to former referee Luis Paulino Siles who, in 1982, became the first Costa Rican to officiate a match at a FIFA World Cup.

The tournament began with two scoreless draws in the UCR vs Cartaginés and Herediano vs Guadalupe matches. Saprissa's Luis Stewart Pérez scored the first goal of the tournament, during his team's match against Carmelita.

=== Regular season ===
Defending champions Herediano topped the season undefeated with 54 points. By achieving this, Herediano broke two records in the league. They became the first team with the longest undefeated streak (surpassing the 21-match streak by Saprissa in the 2003–04 season, the team being coincidentally managed by Hernán Medford). The team also broke the record for more points achieved in a regular season, surpassing Alajuelense in the 2014 Invierno season.

On 3 September 2017, the match between Saprissa and Grecia was suspended at the 81st minute due to a false bomb threat. The remaining nine minutes were played the next morning.

==== Standings ====
Pos	Team	Pld	W	D	L	GF	GA	GD	Pts	Qualification
1	Herediano	22	16	6	0	41	12	+29	54	Advanced to the quadrangular and a possible final
2	Saprissa	22	13	4	5	50	27	+23	43	Advanced to the quadrangular
3	Santos de Guápiles	22	11	7	4	46	28	+18	40	Advanced to the quadrangular
4	Pérez Zeledón	22	10	6	6	43	33	+10	36	Advanced to the quadrangular
5	Alajuelense	22	8	7	7	38	31	+7	31	
6	Grecia	22	8	7	7	31	37	−6	31	
7	Limón	22	7	9	6	35	36	−1	30	
8	Cartaginés	22	4	11	7	27	38	−11	23	
9	UCR	22	4	8	10	16	28	−12	20	
10	Carmelita	22	4	6	12	29	38	−9	18	
11	Guadalupe	22	3	7	12	22	36	−14	16	
12	Liberia	22	4	2	16	23	57	−34	14	

Updated to match(es) played on 16 November 2017. Source: Soccerway
Rules for classification: 1) points; 2) goal difference; 3) goals scored; 4) head-to-head points; 5) head-to-head goal difference; 6) head-to-head goals scored; 7) draw

=== Quadrangular – Apertura ===
==== Standings ====
Pos	Team	Pld	W	D	L	GF	GA	GD	Pts	Qualification
1	Pérez Zeledón	6	4	1	1	9	6	+3	13	Final
2	Saprissa	6	3	1	2	7	6	+1	10	
3	Herediano	6	2	0	4	5	5	0	6	Final
4	Santos de Guápiles	6	1	2	3	3	7	−4	5	

Source: UNAFUT.com
Rules for classification: 1) points; 2) goal difference; 3) goals scored; 4) head-to-head points; 5) head-to-head goal difference; 6) head-to-head goals scored; 7) draw

=== Apertura finals ===
Since regular season leaders Herediano were unable to top the quadrangular stage, a double-legged final will be played against the quadrangular winner Pérez Zeledón in order to determine the champions of the Apertura tournament. By getting more points in the aggregate table, Herediano will host the second leg.

20 December 2017
20:00 (UTC-6)

Pérez Zeledón	1–0	Herediano
Venegas 15'

Estadio Municipal Pérez Zeledón
Referee: Ricardo Montero

23 December 2017
20:00 (UTC-6)

Herediano	0–0	Pérez Zeledón

Estadio Eladio Rosabal Cordero
Referee: Keylor Herrera

== Torneo Clausura ==
The Clausura tournament will be played in the first half of 2018, starting on 7 January and, given the possibility of a final, ending on 20 May. The tournament is dedicated to the Costa Rica national football team squad that played in the 1990 FIFA World Cup, represented by their captain Róger Flores.

=== Regular season ===
==== Standings ====
Pos	Team	Pld	W	D	L	GF	GA	GD	Pts	Qualification
1	Herediano	22	13	6	3	34	14	+20	45	Advance to the quadrangular and a possible final
2	Saprissa	22	13	5	4	43	21	+22	44	Advance to the quadrangular
3	Alajuelense	22	13	4	5	46	25	+21	43	Advance to the quadrangular
4	Santos	22	10	9	3	30	16	+14	39	Advance to the quadrangular
5	Guadalupe	22	7	8	7	28	32	−4	29	
6	Limón	22	7	7	8	31	31	0	28	
7	Pérez Zeledón	22	7	7	8	27	32	−5	28	
8	UCR	22	6	7	9	26	32	−6	25	
9	Carmelita	22	7	4	11	26	39	−13	25	
10	Grecia	22	6	6	10	27	34	−7	24	
11	Liberia	22	3	6	13	18	44	−26	15	
12	Cartaginés	22	1	9	12	16	32	−16	12	

Rules for classification: 1) points; 2) goal difference; 3) goals scored; 4) head-to-head points; 5) head-to-head goal difference; 6) head-to-head goals scored; 7) draw

==== Results ====
Home \ Away	ALA	CRM	CAR	GRE	GUA	HER	LIB	LIM	PEZ	SAN	SAP	UCR
Alajuelense		^{MD22}	^{MD16}	^{MD12}	^{MD08}	^{MD03}	^{MD06}	1–0	^{MD15}	^{MD20}	^{MD18}	^{MD10}
Carmelita	^{MD11}		2–1	^{MD21}	^{MD07}	^{MD13}	^{MD19}	^{MD17}	^{MD05}	^{MD03}	^{MD15}	^{MD09}
Cartaginés	^{MD05}	^{MD12}		^{MD18}	^{MD15}	^{MD20}	^{MD22}	^{MD10}	^{MD17}	^{MD08}	^{MD03}	1–1
Grecia	1–2	^{MD10}	^{MD07}		^{MD13}	^{MD15}	^{MD09}	^{MD03}	^{MD19}	^{MD05}	^{MD17}	^{MD22}
Guadalupe	^{MD19}	^{MD18}	2–1	2–1		^{MD06}	^{MD14}	^{MD09}	^{MD11}	^{MD12}	^{MD21}	^{MD16}
Herediano	^{MD14}	0–1	^{MD09}	^{MD04}	^{MD17}		^{MD10}	^{MD19}	^{MD07}	^{MD22}	^{MD05}	^{MD12}
Liberia	^{MD17}	^{MD08}	^{MD11}	^{MD20}	^{MD03}	^{MD21}		^{MD05}	^{MD13}	^{MD15}	0–3	^{MD18}
Limón	^{MD13}	^{MD06}	^{MD21}	^{MD14}	^{MD20}	^{MD08}	^{MD16}		1–1	^{MD18}	^{MD11}	^{MD04}
Pérez Zeledón	^{MD04}	^{MD16}	^{MD06}	^{MD08}	^{MD22}	^{MD18}	2–2	^{MD12}		^{MD10}	^{MD20}	^{MD14}
Santos	^{MD09}	^{MD14}	^{MD19}	^{MD16}	1–1	^{MD11}	^{MD04}	^{MD07}	^{MD21}		^{MD13}	^{MD06}
Saprissa	^{MD07}	^{MD04}	^{MD14}	^{MD06}	^{MD10}	^{MD16}	^{MD12}	^{MD22}	^{MD09}	1–0		^{MD19}
C.F. Universidad de Costa Rica	^{MD21}	^{MD20}	^{MD13}	^{MD11}	^{MD05}	0–1	^{MD07}	^{MD15}	2–1	^{MD17}	^{MD08}	

Updated to match(es) played on unknown. Source:
Legend: Blue = home team win; Yellow = draw; Red = away team win.

=== Quadrangular – Clausura ===
Pos	Team	Pld	W	D	L	GF	GA	GD	Pts	Qualification
1	Saprissa	6	3	2	1	13	8	+5	11	Final
2	Alajuelense	6	3	2	1	10	8	+2	11	
3	Herediano	6	3	0	3	8	7	+1	9	Final
4	Santos	6	1	0	5	5	13	−8	3	

Rules for classification: 1) points; 2) goal difference; 3) goals scored; 4) head-to-head points; 5) head-to-head goal difference; 6) head-to-head goals scored; 7) draw

=== Clausura Finals ===
Since regular season leaders Herediano were unable to top the quadrangular stage, a double-legged final will be played against the quadrangular winner Saprissa in order to determine the champions of the Clausura tournament.

15 May 2018
20:05 (UTC-6)

Herediano	1–1	Saprissa
O. Arrellano 11'		80' Y. Salinas

Estadio Eladio Rosabal Cordero
Referee: Henry Bejarano

20 May 2018

Saprissa	0–0 (a.e.t.)	Herediano
Penalties
	4-3

Estadio Ricardo Saprissa Aymá
Referee: Ricardo Montero

== Aggregate table ==
Pos	Team	Pld	W	D	L	GF	GA	GD	Pts	Qualification or relegation
1	Herediano	44	29	12	3	75	26	+49	99	2018 CONCACAF League
2	Saprissa	44	26	9	9	93	48	+45	87	2019 CONCACAF Champions League
3	Santos de Guápiles	44	21	16	7	76	44	+32	79	2018 CONCACAF League
4	Alajuelense	44	21	11	12	84	56	+28	74	
5	Pérez Zeledón	44	17	13	14	70	65	+5	64	2018 CONCACAF League
6	Limón	44	14	16	14	66	67	−1	58	
7	Grecia	44	14	13	17	58	71	−13	55	
8	Guadalupe	44	10	15	19	50	68	−18	45	
9	UCR	44	10	15	19	42	60	−18	45	
10	Carmelita	44	11	10	23	55	77	−22	43	
11	Cartaginés	44	5	20	19	43	70	−27	35	
12	Liberia	44	7	8	29	41	89	−48	29	Relegation to the 2018–19 Liga de Ascenso

Updated to match(es) played on 15 November 2017. Source:
Rules for classification: 1) points; 2) goal difference; 3) goals scored; 4) head-to-head points; 5) head-to-head goal difference; 6) head-to-head goals scored; 7) draw
