= 2014–15 Liga FPD =

Primera División
- Season: 2014–15
- Champions: Invierno: Saprissa (31st title); Verano: Herediano (24th title)
- Champions League: Saprissa; TBD
- Matches: 138
- Goals: 374 (2.71 per match)
- Top goalscorer: Yendrick Ruiz (15 goals)
- Biggest home win: Alajuelense 5–0 Puma Generaleña
- Biggest away win: Belén Siglo XXI 1–4 Carmelita; Limón 1–4 Herediano; Carmelita 0–3 Santos; Carmelita 0–3 UCR
- Highest scoring: Pérez Zeledón 6–4 Santos
- Longest winning run: Alajuelense (6)
- Longest unbeaten run: Alajuelense (10)
- Longest winless run: Belén Siglo XXI (8)
- Longest losing run: Uruguay (5)
- Highest attendance: 25,992; Alajuelense 0–2 Saprissa
- Lowest attendance: 23; AS Puma 1–1 Carmelita
- All statistics correct as of 15 October 2014.

The 2014–15 Costa Rican FPD was the 95th season of the Costa Rican top-flight football league. It was divided into two championships: the Invierno [winter] and Verano [summer] seasons.

The Invierno season was dedicated to Manuel Antonio "Pilo" Obando.

== Teams ==
The league was contested by a total of 12 teams, including Puma Generaleña, promoted from the 2013–14 Liga de Ascenso. While Puntarenas were relegated.

Locations of the 2014-15 Costa Rican FPD teams

=== Personnel, kits and Stadia ===
Note: Table lists in alphabetical order.

| Team | Manager | Kit manufacturer | Shirt sponsor(s) | Stadium | Capacity |
|---|---|---|---|---|---|
| Alajuelense | (Costa Rica) Óscar Ramírez | Puma | Movistar, Ibérico | Alejandro Morera Soto - Scotiabank | 18,000 |
| Puma Generaleña | (Costa Rica) Édgar Carvajal | JB | Arroz Sabanero | Municipal de Pérez Zeledón | 6,000 |
| Belén | (Costa Rica) Briance Camacho | JB | Bridgestone | Polideportivo de Belén | 3,000 |
| Carmelita | (Portugal) Guilherme Farinha | Sportek | Great Wall | Alejandro Morera Soto - Scotiabank | 18,000 |
| Cartaginés | (Costa Rica) Mauricio Wright | Lotto | Huawei, Bancrédito | "Fello" Meza | 13,500 |
| Herediano | (Uruguay) César Méndez | Umbro | kölbi, Roshfrans, Peugeot, La 400, San Miguel | Eladio Rosabal Cordero | 8,500 |
| Limón | (Costa Rica) Rónald Gómez | Sportek | APM Terminals | Juan Gobán | 3,000 |
| Pérez Zeledón | (Costa Rica) Marvin Solano | Canastico | kölbi, GAFESO | Municipal de Pérez Zeledón | 6,000 |
| Santos | (Mexico) Enrique Meza, Jr. | Joma | PickLounge | Ebal Rodríguez | 3,000 |
| Saprissa | (Costa Rica) Rónald González | Kappa | Bimbo, Ibérico | Ricardo Saprissa | 23,000 |
| UCR | (Argentina) José Giacone | Sportek | — | Estadio Ecológico | 1,800 |
| Uruguay de Coronado | (Costa Rica) Carlos Watson | Lotto | CoopeAlianza | Municipal El Labrador | 4,000 |

== Managerial changes ==
=== During the season ===
| Team | Outgoing manager | Manner of departure | Date of vacancy | Replaced by | Appointed | Position in table |
|---|---|---|---|---|---|---|
| Herediano | (Uruguay) Eduardo Méndez | TBD | 2014 | (Costa Rica) Jafet Soto | 2014 | th (2014) |
| Limón | (Costa Rica) Ronald Gomez | Sacked | 2014 | (Costa Rica) Kenneth Barrantes | 2014 | th ( 2014) |
| Pérez Zeledón | (Costa Rica) Marvin Solano | Sacked | 2014 | (Uruguay) Víctor Abelenda | 2014 | th (2014) |
| Puma Generaleña | (Costa Rica) Edgar Carvajal | Sacked | 2014 | (Argentina) Mario Carrera | 2014 | th ( 2014) |
| Saprissa | (Costa Rica) Ronald Gonzalez | Sacked | 2014 | (Costa Rica) Jeaustin Campos | 2014 | th ( 2014) |

== Campeonato de Invierno ==
The tournament began on 15 August 2014, with Carmelita defeating Limón 2–0, with Guatemalan player Angelo Padilla scoring the first goal of the tournament. It ended on 21 December 2014, with Saprissa winning their 31st title after they overcome Herediano in the final.

=== First Stage ===
==== Standings ====
| Pos | Team | Pld | W | D | L | GF | GA | GD | Pts | Qualification |
|---|---|---|---|---|---|---|---|---|---|---|
| 1 | Alajuelense | 22 | 17 | 2 | 3 | 38 | 15 | +23 | 53 | Advances to the Semifinals |
| 2 | Herediano | 22 | 14 | 4 | 4 | 45 | 19 | +26 | 46 | Advances to the Semifinals |
| 3 | Cartaginés | 22 | 13 | 3 | 6 | 29 | 19 | +10 | 42 | Advances to the Semifinals |
| 4 | Saprissa | 22 | 13 | 2 | 7 | 39 | 28 | +11 | 41 | Advances to the Semifinals |
| 5 | Universidad de Costa Rica | 22 | 9 | 8 | 5 | 30 | 21 | +9 | 35 | |
| 6 | Pérez Zeledón | 22 | 8 | 5 | 9 | 31 | 36 | −5 | 29 | |
| 7 | Carmelita | 22 | 7 | 6 | 9 | 22 | 26 | −4 | 27 | |
| 8 | Santos | 22 | 8 | 2 | 12 | 29 | 34 | −5 | 26 | |
| 9 | Belén | 22 | 6 | 8 | 8 | 28 | 31 | −3 | 26 | |
| 10 | Limón | 22 | 4 | 4 | 14 | 19 | 33 | −14 | 16 | |
| 11 | Uruguay | 22 | 4 | 4 | 14 | 17 | 41 | −24 | 16 | |
| 12 | Puma Generaleña | 22 | 3 | 4 | 15 | 21 | 46 | −25 | 13 | |

Updated to match(es) played on 10 September 2014. Source: Resultados Invierno 2014 - UNAFUT.com
Rules for classification: 1) points; 2) goal difference; 3) number of goals scored.

=== Results ===
| Home \ Away | ALA | BEL | CRM | CAR | HER | LIM | PEZ | PUM | SAN | SAP | UCR | URU |
|---|---|---|---|---|---|---|---|---|---|---|---|---|
| Alajuelense | | 2–2 | 2–0 | 2–1 | 1–0 | 2–1 | 2–1 | 5–0 | 1–0 | 0–2 | 2–1 | 3–0 |
| Belén | 2–0 | | 1–4 | 0–1 | 2–2 | 1–0 | 0–0 | 3–1 | 1–1 | 4–3 | 1–1 | 4–2 |
| Carmelita | 0–2 | 2–0 | | 1–1 | 0–1 | 2–0 | 1–2 | 3–2 | 0–3 | 1–0 | 0–3 | 2–0 |
| Cartaginés | 0–2 | 2–0 | 1–2 | | 4–2 | 1–0 | 1–0 | 2–1 | 1–0 | 1–0 | 0–0 | 3–1 |
| Herediano | 1–0 | 1–1 | 2–0 | 1–0 | | 3–0 | 5–1 | 5–1 | 2–0 | 3–2 | 0–0 | 6–2 |
| Limón | 0–1 | 2–1 | 0–0 | 2–4 | 1–4 | | 1–2 | 0–1 | 3–1 | 2–3 | 2–0 | 1–1 |
| Pérez Zeledón | 2–3 | 1–1 | 1–1 | 1–0 | 2–1 | 2–1 | | 2–1 | 6–4 | 1–1 | 2–3 | 4–2 |
| Puma Generaleña | 1–2 | 0–0 | 1–1 | 0–1 | 1–4 | 0–0 | 1–0 | | 1–2 | 0–2 | 3–3 | 2–1 |
| Santos | 1–2 | 1–2 | 2–1 | 2–1 | 0–1 | 0–2 | 2–2 | 2–1 | | 0–1 | 2–1 | 2–0 |
| Saprissa | 0–2 | 2–1 | 2–1 | 1–2 | 1–0 | 2–0 | 4–1 | 4–2 | 3–2 | | 3–1 | 2–1 |
| Universidad de Costa Rica | 0–0 | 2–1 | 0–0 | 1–1 | 0–0 | 1–0 | 2–1 | 3–1 | 2–0 | 2–0 | | 3–0 |
| Uruguay | 0–2 | 1–0 | 0–0 | 0–1 | 0–1 | 1–1 | 1–0 | 1–0 | 0–2 | 1–1 | 2–1 | |

Updated to match(es) played on 2014. Source:
Legend: Blue = home team win; Yellow = draw; Red = away team win.

=== Second stage ===
Semifinals
1 | Alajuelense | 0 | 1 | 1
4 | Saprissa | 1 | 1 | 2
2 | Herediano | 3 | 0 | 3
3 | Cartaginés | 2 | 0 | 2

Finals
4 | Saprissa | 4 | 1 | 5
2 | Herediano | 2 | 1 | 3

==== Semifinals ====
First legs

3 December 2014
20:00

| Cartaginés | 2–3 | Herediano |
|---|---|---|
| Scott 63' (pen.); Vega 90+1' | | 7' 81' (pen.) Ruiz; 9' Núñez |

Fello Meza, Cartago
Attendance: 5,129
Referee: Jeffrey Solís

4 December 2014
20:10

| Saprissa | 1–0 | Alajuelense |
|---|---|---|
| Mora 90+1' |

Ricardo Saprissa, Tibás
Attendance: 18,328
Referee: Randall Poveda

Second legs

7 December 2014
18:00

| Herediano | 0–0 | Cartaginés |

Eladio Rosabal Cordero, Heredia
Attendance: 4,900
Referee: Henry Bejarano

8 December 2014
20:00

| Alajuelense | 1–1 | Saprissa |
|---|---|---|
| Ortíz 61' | | 43' Vega |

Alejandro Morera Soto, Alajuela
Attendance: 15,341
Referee: Walter Quesada

==== Finals ====
First leg

14 December 2014
21:00

| Saprissa | 4–2 | Herediano |
|---|---|---|
| Mora 4'; Rodríguez 12'; Bustos 50'; Colindres 90' | | 29' 68' (pen.) Ruiz |

Ricardo Saprissa, Tibás
Attendance: 19,784
Referee: Walter Quesada

Second leg

21 December 2014
20:00

| Herediano | 1–1 | Saprissa |
|---|---|---|
| Salazar 59' | | 36' Vega |

Eladio Rosabal Cordero, Heredia
Attendance: 5,283
Referee: Henry Bejarano

=== Top scorers ===
| Rank | Player | Club | Goals |
|---|---|---|---|
| 1 | (Costa Rica) Armando Alonso | Alajuelense | 6 |
| 2 | (Guatemala) Angelo Padilla | Carmelita | 5 |
| 2 | (Uruguay) Fabrizio Ronchetti | Pérez Zeledón | 5 |
| 2 | (Costa Rica) Jonathan Sibaja | UCR | 5 |
| 5 | (Costa Rica) Alejandro Alpízar | Pérez Zeledón | 4 |
| 5 | (Costa Rica) Ariel Contreras | UCR | 4 |
| 5 | (Costa Rica) Cristian Lagos | Santos | 4 |
| 5 | (Honduras) Jerry Palacios | Alajuelense | 4 |
| 5 | (Costa Rica) Ariel Rodríguez | Saprissa | 4 |
| 10 | (Costa Rica) Leonardo Adams | Belén | 3 |
| 10 | (Costa Rica) Juan Bustos | Saprissa | 3 |
| 10 | (Costa Rica) Victor Coto | UCR | 3 |
| 10 | (Costa Rica) Allan Duarte | UCR | 3 |
| 10 | (Costa Rica) Kevin Fajardo | Santos | 3 |
| 10 | (Chile) Ismael Fuentes | Santos | 3 |
| 10 | (Costa Rica) Josué Martínez | UCR | 3 |
| 10 | (Costa Rica) Aaron Navarro | Puma | 3 |
| 10 | (Costa Rica) Víctor Núñez | Herediano | 3 |
| 10 | (Mexico) Antonio Pedroza | Herediano | 3 |
| 10 | (Costa Rica) Olman Vargas | UCR | 3 |

=== List of foreign players in the league ===
This is a list of foreign players in Invierno 2014. The following players:

1. have played at least one apertura game for the respective club.
2. have not been capped for the Costa Rica national football team on any level, independently from the birthplace

A new rule was introduced a few season ago, that clubs can only have three foreign players per club and can only add a new player if there is an injury or player/s is released.

Alajuelense

- (Honduras) Ramon Nunez
- (Honduras) Jerry Palacios

Belén

- (Uruguay) José Carlos Cancela

Carmelita

- (Guatemala) Angelo Padilla

Cartaginés

- (Argentina) Luciano Bostal
- (Uruguay) Paolo Cardozo
- (Uruguay) Leandro Silva

Herediano

- (Canada) Keven Alemán
- (El Salvador) Alexander Larin
- (England) (Mexico) Antonio Pedroza
- (Panama) Gabriel Enrique Gómez
- (Panama) Brunet Hay

Limón

- (Argentina) Rodrigo Lucas Martella

(player released during the season)

Pérez Zeledón

- (Argentina) Tomas Fonseca
- (Brazil) Maurim
- (Colombia) Andrés Santamaría
- (Panama) Óscar McFarlane
- (Uruguay) Fabrizio Ronchetti

Puma Generaleña

- (Panama) Yamir Vergara

Saprissa

- (Bolivia) Carlos Saucedo
- (Guatemala) Rafael Morales
- (Panama) Adolfo Machado

Santos

- (Chile) Ismael Fuentes
- (Mexico) Jorge Hernández
- (Mexico) Antonio Salazar

Universidad de Costa Rica

- (Brazil) Jorge Barbosa
- (Colombia) Pablo Madrigal
- (Colombia) Omar Royero

Uruguay

- (Honduras) Jeffrey Brooks Martines

== Campeonato de Verano ==
The tournament will begin in January 2015.

=== Personnel and sponsoring (2015 Verano) ===
| Team | Manager | Captain | Kit manufacturer | Shirt sponsor |
|---|---|---|---|---|
| Alajuelense | (Costa Rica) Oscar Ramírez | TBD | Puma SE | Movistar, Ibérico, Banco General |
| Belén | (Costa Rica) Briance Camacho | TBD | TBD | TBD |
| Carmelita | (Portugal) Guilherme Farinha | (Costa Rica) | TBD | TBD |
| Cartaginés | (Mexico) Enrique Meza | (Costa Rica) TBD | Lotto | Bancrédito, Huawei |
| Herediano | (Costa Rica) Mauricio Wright | TBD | Umbro | kölbi |
| Limón | (Uruguay) Mario Silva | (Uruguay) TBD | TBD | TBD |
| Pérez Zeledón | (Uruguay) Víctor Abelenda | (Costa Rica) TBD | TBD | TBD |
| Puma Generaleña | (Costa Rica) Marvin Solano | (Costa Rica) TBD | TBD | TBD |
| Santos | (Uruguay) César Eduardo Méndez | (Costa Rica) TBD | TBD | TBD |
| Saprissa | (Costa Rica) Jeaustin Campos | (Costa Rica) TBD | Kappa | Bimbo, Ibérico, Gatorade, Claro |
| Universidad de Costa Rica | (Argentina) José Giacone | (Costa Rica) TBD | LaTres | Banco Nacional |
| Uruguay | (Argentina) Martín Cardetti | (Costa Rica) TBD | Lotto | CoopeAlianza, Jaúles, Peugeot |

=== During the season ===
| Team | Outgoing manager | Manner of departure | Date of vacancy | Replaced by | Date of appointment | Position in table |
|---|---|---|---|---|---|---|
| Belén | (Costa Rica) Briance Camacho | TBD | 2015 | (Costa Rica) Gerardo Ureña | 2015 | th (Clausura 2015) |
| Limón | (Uruguay) Mario Silva | Sacked | 2015 | (Costa Rica) Kenneth Barrantes | 2015 | th (Clausura 2015) |
| Cartaginés | (Mexico) Enrique Maximiliano Meza | | 2015 | (Uruguay) Claudio Fabián Ciccia | 2015 | th (Clausura 2015) |
| AD Carmelita | (Portugal) Guillerme Farinha | Sacked | 2015 | (Costa Rica) Erick Guillén Interim | 2015 | th (Clausura 2015) |
| AD Carmelita | (Costa Rica) Erick Guillén | | 2015 | (Costa Rica) Hugo Robles | 2015 | th (Clausura 2015) |
| AS Puma Generaleña | (Costa Rica) Marvin Solano | Sacked | 2015 | (Costa Rica) Edgar Carvajal | 2015 | th (Clausura 2015) |
| Herediano | (Costa Rica) Mauricio Wright | Sacked | 2015 | (Brazil) Odir Jacques | 2015 | th (Clausura 2015) |

=== First Stage ===
==== Standings ====
| Pos | Team | Pld | W | D | L | GF | GA | GD | Pts | Qualification |
|---|---|---|---|---|---|---|---|---|---|---|
| 1 | Saprissa | 22 | 14 | 3 | 5 | 44 | 22 | +22 | 45 | Advances to the Semifinals |
| 2 | Santos | 22 | 12 | 4 | 6 | 32 | 28 | +4 | 40 | Advances to the Semifinals |
| 3 | Herediano | 22 | 11 | 6 | 5 | 28 | 23 | +5 | 39 | Advances to the Semifinals |
| 4 | Alajuelense | 22 | 10 | 7 | 5 | 43 | 23 | +20 | 37 | Advances to the Semifinals |
| 5 | Pérez Zeledón | 22 | 10 | 2 | 10 | 31 | 31 | 0 | 32 | |
| 6 | Uruguay | 22 | 7 | 8 | 7 | 28 | 27 | +1 | 29 | |
| 7 | Cartaginés | 22 | 6 | 9 | 7 | 29 | 27 | +2 | 27 | |
| 8 | Carmelita | 22 | 7 | 5 | 10 | 23 | 34 | −11 | 26 | |
| 9 | Limón | 22 | 8 | 0 | 14 | 26 | 39 | −13 | 24 | |
| 10 | Puma Generaleña | 22 | 6 | 5 | 11 | 24 | 36 | −12 | 23 | |
| 11 | Universidad de Costa Rica | 22 | 4 | 10 | 8 | 27 | 29 | −2 | 22 | |
| 12 | Belén | 22 | 6 | 3 | 13 | 25 | 41 | −16 | 21 | |

Updated to match(es) played on 14 March 2015. Source:
Rules for classification: 1) points; 2) goal difference; 3) number of goals scored.

=== Results ===
| Home \ Away | ALA | BEL | CRM | CAR | HER | LIM | PEZ | PUM | SAN | SAP | UCR | URU |
|---|---|---|---|---|---|---|---|---|---|---|---|---|
| Alajuelense | | 6–0 | 0–1 | 6–2 | 4–0 | 1–2 | 1–0 | 5–0 | 2–2 | 0–2 | 2–2 | 3–0 |
| Belén | 1–1 | | 5–0 | 1–1 | 1–3 | 1–4 | 1–0 | 2–0 | 2–4 | 1–2 | 0–0 | 1–0 |
| Carmelita | 2–0 | 3–0 | | 2–0 | 0–0 | 1–0 | 0–3 | 0–1 | 0–1 | 2–3 | 1–0 | 1–3 |
| Cartaginés | 3–1 | 2–0 | 2–2 | | 1–1 | 7–2 | 1–0 | 2–0 | 0–1 | 1–1 | 1–1 | 0–0 |
| Herediano | 0–1 | 1–0 | 2–1 | 1–0 | | 2–0 | 2–1 | 3–2 | 1–1 | 1–0 | 3–2 | 2–2 |
| Limón | 0–2 | 3–0 | 0–3 (Note: The Limón–Carmelita match was suspended because of an unpaid ₡30 million debt to the Caja Costarricense de Seguro Social. Limón tried to appeal the suspension in order to reprogram the game. However, the appeal was denied by the Competition Committee and Limón was sanctioned with a 0–3 loss.) | 1–0 | 2–1 | | 2–1 | 0–1 | 2–0 | 1–2 | 3–2 | 1–3 |
| Pérez Zeledón | 1–2 | 2–1 | 5–2 | 1–1 | 1–0 | 2–1 | | 3–2 | 3–1 | 1–3 | 1–0 | 1–1 |
| Puma Generaleña | 2–2 | 1–0 | 4–1 | 1–1 | 1–1 | 1–0 | 1–2 | | 2–1 | 1–1 | 0–2 | 0–1 |
| Santos | 1–2 | 3–2 | 1–1 | 3–2 | 1–0 | 2–0 | 2–1 | 2–0 | | 0–1 | 2–1 | 2–1 |
| Saprissa | 1–1 | 1–2 | 4–0 | 1–0 | 1–2 | 1–0 | 5–1 | 3–2 | 4–0 | | 2–1 | 4–1 |
| Universidad de Costa Rica | 1–1 | 3–2 | 0–0 | 1–1 | 0–0 | 4–2 | 1–2 | 1–1 | 0–1 | 2–1 | | 1–1 |
| Uruguay | 0–0 | 1–2 | 0–0 | 0–1 | 1–2 | 3–1 | 2–0 | 3–1 | 1–1 | 2–1 | 2–2 | |

Legend: Blue = home team win; Yellow = draw; Red = away team win.

=== Second stage ===
Semifinals
1 | Saprissa | 1 | 0 | 1
4 | Alajuelense | 0 | 2 | 2
2 | Santos de Guápiles | 1 | 1 | 2
3 | Herediano | 2 | 1 | 3

Finals
4 | Alajuelense | 1 | 2 | 3 (2)
3 | Herediano (p) | 1 | 2 | 3 (3)

==== Semifinals ====
First legs

9 May 2015

| Herediano | 2 – 1 | Santos de Guápiles |
|---|---|---|
| Cristhian Lagos 12'; Jonathan Hansen 68' | | 71' Edder Monguio |

Eladio Rosabal Cordero, Heredia
Attendance: 7,000
Referee: Ricardo Montero

10 May 2015

| Alajuelense | 2 – 0 | Saprissa |
|---|---|---|
| 21' 39' Jonathan McDonald | | None |

Alejandro Morera Soto, Alajuela
Attendance: 15,400
Referee: Hugo Cruz

Second legs

13 May 2015

| Santos de Guápiles | 1 – 1 | Herediano |
|---|---|---|
| Kenneth Dixon 1' | | Randall Azofeifa 6' |

Estadio Ebal Rodríguez, Pococcí, Ciudad de Limón
Attendance: 5,000
Referee: Henry Bejarano

13 May 2015

| Saprissa | 1 – 0 | Alajuelense |
|---|---|---|
| Deyver Vega 54' | | None |

Ricardo Saprissa, Tibás
Attendance: 18,000
Referee: Randall Poveda

==== Finals ====
First leg

19 May 2015
22:15

| Alajuelense | 1 – 1 | Herediano |
|---|---|---|
| José Guillermo Ortiz 1' | | Elías Aguilar 84' |

Alejandro Morera Soto, Alajuela
Referee: Walter Quesada

Second leg

23 May 2015
22:00

| Herediano | 2 – 2 (a.e.t.) | Alajuelense |
|---|---|---|
| Jonathan Hansen 31'; Keyner Brown 118' | | Pablo Gabas 54'; Johan Venegas 95' |
Penalties
| Penalty missed Penalty scored | 3-2 | Penalty scored Penalty missed |

Eladio Rosabal Cordero, Heredia

== Top goalscorers ==
| Rank | Player | Team | Goals |
|---|---|---|---|
| 1 | (Costa Rica) Jonathan McDonald | Alajuelense | 19 |
| 2 | (Costa Rica) Jonathan Moya | Saprissa | 18 |
| 3 | (Costa Rica) Yendrick Ruiz | Herediano | 18 |
| 4 | (Costa Rica) Ariel Rodriguez | Saprissa | 15 |
| 5 | (Costa Rica) Kenneth Dixon | Santos | 15 |
| 6 | (Costa Rica) Alejandro Alpizar | Uruguay de Cornado | 14 |

== List of foreign players in the league ==
This is a list of foreign players in Verano 2015. The following players:

1. have played at least one Verano game for the respective club.
2. have not been capped for the Costa Rica national football team on any level, independently from the birthplace

A new rule was introduced a few season ago, that clubs can only have three foreign players per club and can only add a new player if there is an injury or player/s is released.

Alajuelense

- (Brazil) Yvanilton de Almeida
- (Argentina) Leonel Peralta

Belén

- (Panama) Brunet Hay
- (Mexico) Carlos Elizalde Gomez
- (Mexico) Misael Martín Reynoso
- (Colombia) David Arguello Escobar

Carmelita

- (Guatemala) Angelo Padilla
- (Honduras) Víctor Ortiz
- (Argentina) Lucas Monzón

Cartaginés

- (Colombia) William Palacio
- (Uruguay) Fabrizio Ronchetti

Herediano

- (El Salvador) Alexander Larin
- (Mexico) Luis Omar Hernández
- (Panama) Gabriel Enrique Gómez
- (Argentina) Jonathan Hansen

Limón

- (Argentina) Ismael Gómez
- (Argentina) Walter Ariel Silva

(player released during the season)

Pérez Zeledón

- (Argentina) Tomas Fonseca
- (Colombia) Camilo Aguirre
- (Uruguay) Christian Yeladian
- (Uruguay) José Carlos Cancela

Puma Generaleña

- (Panama) David Daniels Gittens
- (Nicaragua) Luis Fernando Copete
- (Nicaragua) Raúl Leguías
- (Argentina) Lucas Carrera

Saprissa

- (Argentina) Andrés Imperiale
- (Panama) Adolfo Machado
- (Uruguay) Sebastián Diana

Santos

- (Guatemala) Jonathan López
- (Honduras) Osman Elis Martínez

Universidad de Costa Rica

- (Brazil) Jorge Barbosa
- (Argentina) Maximiliano Joell Silva

Uruguay

- (Argentina) Gustavo Udrizard
- (Uruguay) Bruno Weisser

== Overall standings ==
| Pos | Team | Pld | W | D | L | GF | GA | GD | Pts | Relegation |
|---|---|---|---|---|---|---|---|---|---|---|
| 1 | Alajuelense | 33 | 22 | 5 | 6 | 56 | 28 | +28 | 71 | |
| 2 | Herediano | 32 | 18 | 8 | 6 | 56 | 26 | +30 | 62 | |
| 3 | Saprissa | 32 | 20 | 2 | 10 | 59 | 37 | +22 | 62 | |
| 4 | Cartaginés | 32 | 16 | 7 | 9 | 41 | 32 | +9 | 55 | |
| 5 | Universidad de Costa Rica | 33 | 11 | 14 | 8 | 42 | 33 | +9 | 47 | |
| 6 | Santos | 33 | 14 | 3 | 16 | 43 | 46 | −3 | 45 | |
| 7 | Pérez Zeledón | 33 | 13 | 6 | 14 | 53 | 58 | −5 | 45 | |
| 8 | Carmelita | 33 | 10 | 10 | 13 | 35 | 40 | −5 | 40 | |
| 9 | Uruguay | 33 | 8 | 8 | 17 | 31 | 53 | −22 | 32 | |
| 10 | Belén | 33 | 7 | 10 | 16 | 36 | 52 | −16 | 31 | |
| 11 | Limón^{1} | 33 | 9 | 4 | 20 | 32 | 50 | −18 | 31 (Note: UNAFUT sanctioned Limón with a 0–3 defeat against Carmelita due to an unpaid debt. Due to this sanction, Limón will be relegated to the Liga de Ascenso if tied in points with another team in the last place, regardless of their goal difference.) | |
| 12 | Puma Generaleña | 32 | 7 | 5 | 20 | 33 | 62 | −29 | 26 | Relegation to Liga de Ascenso |

Updated to match(es) played on 2015. Source:
Rules for classification: 1) points; 2) goal difference; 3) number of goals scored.
