= Keyner Brown =

Costa Rican football player (born 1991)

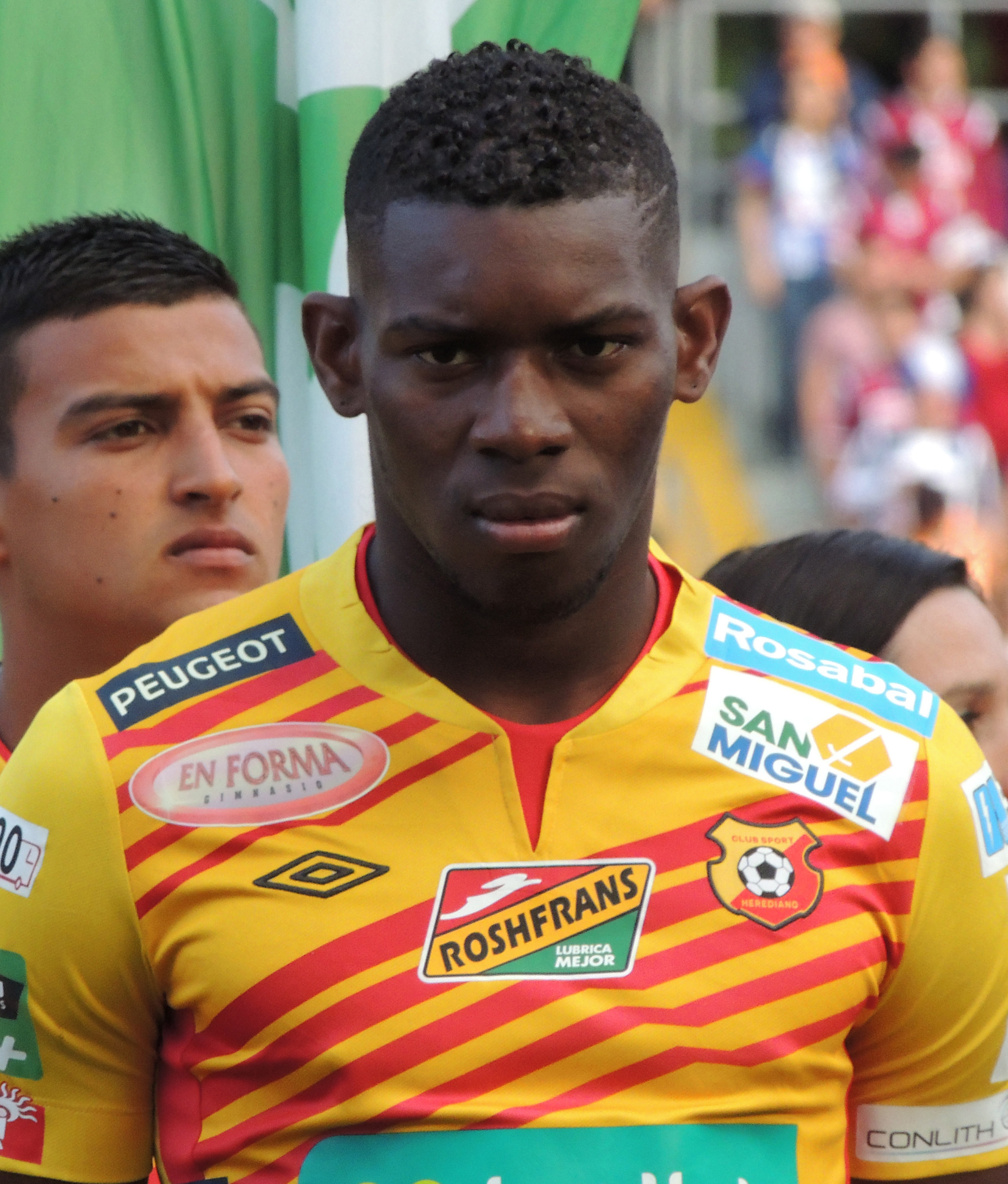
- Brown with Herediano in 2015

Personal information
- Full name: Keyner Yamal Brown Blackwood
- Date of birth: December 30, 1991 (age 34)
- Place of birth: Puerto Limón, Costa Rica
- Height: 1.87 m (6 ft 2 in)
- Position: Defender

Team information
- Current team: Herediano
- Number: 99

Senior career*
Years	Team	Apps	(Gls)
2010–2011	Brujas	7	(0)
2011–2012	Orión	4	(0)
2011–2012	→ Limón (loan)	8	(0)
2012–2014	Uruguay	72	(11)
2014–	Herediano	262	(10)
2016	→ Houston Dynamo (loan)	4	(0)

International career
2015–	Costa Rica	5	(0)
- * Club domestic league appearances and goals as of 13:58, 6 June 2022 (UTC)

Keyner Yamal Brown Blackwood (born 30 December 1991) is a Costa Rican professional footballer who plays for Liga FPD club Herediano and the Costa Rica national team.

== Career ==
=== Professional ===
Brown began his career with Brujas in 2010. He spent his entire career in Costa Rica, before going on loan to Major League Soccer side Houston Dynamo on 3 August 2016. The Dynamo rejected the option to buy and Brown returned to Herediano at the end of 2016.

== Honors ==
Herediano

- Costa Rican Primera División: Clausura 2015, Clausura 2016, Clausura 2017, Apertura 2018, Apertura 2019
- CONCACAF League: 2018
