= 2018 CONCACAF League =

2018 Scotiabank CONCACAF League

Tournament details
- Dates: 31 July – 1 November
- Teams: 16 (from 8 associations)

Final positions
- Champions: (Costa Rica) Herediano (1st title)
- Runners-up: (Honduras) Motagua

Tournament statistics
- Matches played: 30
- Goals scored: 76 (2.53 per match)
- Top scorer(s): (Panama) Edwin Aguilar (Honduras) Román Castillo (Costa Rica) Yendrick Ruiz (5 goals each)
- Best player: (Costa Rica) Yendrick Ruiz
- Best young player: (Costa Rica) Jimmy Marín
- Best goalkeeper: (Costa Rica) Leonel Moreira
- Fair play award: (Honduras) Motagua

The 2018 CONCACAF League (officially the 2018 Scotiabank CONCACAF League for sponsorship purposes) was the second edition of the CONCACAF League, a football club competition organized by CONCACAF, the regional governing body of North America, Central America, and the Caribbean.

Herediano defeated Motagua in the final to win their first CONCACAF League, and qualified for the 2019 CONCACAF Champions League to join the 15 direct entrants. Olimpia were the title holders, but did not qualify for this tournament and were unable to defend their title, and consequently their streak of participating in all ten editions of the CONCACAF Champions League since 2008 ended.

== Qualification ==
A total of 16 teams participate in the CONCACAF League:

- Central American Zone: 13 teams (from six associations; ordinarily from seven associations, but Guatemalan teams were excluded from this season's tournament)
- Caribbean Zone: 3 teams (from two or three associations)

Therefore, teams from either 8 or 9 out of the 41 CONCACAF member associations may participate in the CONCACAF League.

=== Central America ===
The 13 berths for the Central American Football Union (UNCAF) are allocated to the seven UNCAF member associations as follows: two berths for each of Costa Rica, El Salvador, Guatemala, Honduras, Panama, and Nicaragua, and one berth for Belize.

All of the leagues of Central America employ a split season with two tournaments in one season, so the following teams qualify for the CONCACAF League:

- In the league of Costa Rica, the champions with the worse aggregate record, and the non-champions with the best aggregate record, qualify. If there is any team which are champions of both tournaments, the non-champions with the second best aggregate record qualify.
- In the leagues of El Salvador, Guatemala, Honduras, and Panama, the champions with the worse aggregate record, and the runners-up with the better aggregate record (or any team which are runners-up of both tournaments), qualify. If there is any team which are finalists of both tournaments, the runners-up with the worse aggregate record qualify. If there are any two teams which are finalists of both tournaments, the semi-finalists with the best aggregate record qualify.
- In the league of Nicaragua, both champions qualify. If there is any team which are champions of both tournaments, the runners-up with the better aggregate record (or any team which are runners-up of both tournaments) qualify.
- In the league of Belize, the champions with the better aggregate record (or any team which are champions of both tournaments) qualify.

If teams from any Central American associations are excluded, they are replaced by teams from other Central American associations, with the associations chosen based on results from previous CONCACAF League and CONCACAF Champions League tournaments. For this season, the two teams from Guatemala were excluded due to the suspension of their federation by FIFA and were replaced by an additional team each from Costa Rica and Panama.

=== Caribbean ===
The three berths for the Caribbean Football Union (CFU), which consists of 31 member associations, are allocated via the CONCACAF Caribbean Club Championship and CONCACAF Caribbean Club Shield, the first-tier and second-tier subcontinental Caribbean club tournaments. Since 2018, the CONCACAF Caribbean Club Championship is open to teams from professional leagues, and the CONCACAF Caribbean Club Shield is open to teams from non-professional leagues. To qualify for the CONCACAF Caribbean Club Championship, teams have to finish as the champions or runners-up of their respective association's league in the previous season, while to qualify for the CONCACAF Caribbean Club Shield, teams have to finish as the champions of their respective association's league in the previous season.

The runners-up and third-placed team of the CONCACAF Caribbean Club Championship, and the winners of a playoff between the fourth-placed team of the CONCACAF Caribbean Club Championship and the champions of the CONCACAF Caribbean Club Shield, qualify for the CONCACAF League. For the champions of the CONCACAF Caribbean Club Shield to be eligible for the playoff, they must comply with the minimum CONCACAF Club Licensing requirements for the CONCACAF League.

== Teams ==
The following 16 teams (from eight associations) qualified for the tournament.

Qualified teams from Central America (13 teams)
Association	Team	Qualifying method	App. (last)	Previous best (last)
Costa Rica (2 + 1 berths)	Pérez Zeledón	Champions with worse aggregate record in 2017–18 season (2017 Apertura)	1st	Debut
Costa Rica (2 + 1 berths)	Herediano	Non-champions with best aggregate record in 2017–18 season	1st	Debut
Costa Rica (2 + 1 berths)	Santos de Guápiles	Non-champions with 2nd best aggregate record in 2017–18 season	2nd (2017)	Runners-up (2017)
Panama (2 + 1 berths)	Universitario	Champions with worse aggregate record in 2017–18 season (2017 Apertura)	2nd (2017)	Quarter-finals (2017)
Panama (2 + 1 berths)	Árabe Unido	Runners-up with better aggregate record in 2017–18 season (2017 Apertura)	2nd (2017)	Semi-finals (2017)
Panama (2 + 1 berths)	Tauro	Runners-up with worse aggregate record in 2017–18 season (2018 Clausura)	1st	Debut
El Salvador (2 berths)	Santa Tecla	2017 Apertura and 2018 Clausura runners-up	1st	Debut
El Salvador (2 berths)	FAS	Semi-finalists with best aggregate record in 2017–18 season (2017 Apertura)	1st	Debut
Honduras (2 berths)	Real España	Champions with worse aggregate record in 2017–18 season (2017 Apertura)	1st	Debut
Honduras (2 berths)	Motagua	2017 Apertura and 2018 Clausura runners-up	1st	Debut
Nicaragua (2 berths)	Walter Ferretti	Champions with better aggregate record in 2017–18 season (2017 Apertura)	2nd (2017)	Quarter-finals (2017)
Nicaragua (2 berths)	Diriangén	Champions with worse aggregate record in 2017–18 season (2018 Clausura)	1st	Debut
Belize (1 berth)	Belmopan Bandits	Champions with better aggregate record in 2017–18 season (2018 Closing)	2nd (2017)	Round of 16 (2017)

Qualified teams from Caribbean (3 teams)
Association	Team	Qualifying method	App. (last)	Previous best (last)
Jamaica	Arnett Gardens	2018 CONCACAF Caribbean Club Championship runners-up	1st	Debut
Jamaica	Portmore United	2018 CONCACAF Caribbean Club Championship third place	2nd (2017)	Round of 16 (2017)
Martinique	Club Franciscain	2018 Caribbean CONCACAF League playoff winners	1st	Debut

Notes

1. Guatemala (GUA): On 28 October 2016, FIFA suspended the National Football Federation of Guatemala for political interference by the Government of Guatemala. Until the suspension is lifted, Guatemalan teams were not permitted to participate in international competitions. CONCACAF set the deadline of 31 March 2018 for the suspension to be lifted in order for Guatemalan teams to participate in the 2018 CONCACAF League, and confirmed on 18 May 2018 that Guatemalan teams were expelled after the federation failed to be reinstated by FIFA. The two Guatemalan teams which would have qualified for the CONCACAF League were:
  - Guastatoya, champions with worse aggregate record in 2017–18 season (2018 Clausura champions)
  - Xelajú MC, runners-up with better aggregate record in 2017–18 season (2018 Clausura runners-up)
  Antigua GFC, champions with better aggregate record in 2017–18 season (2017 Apertura champions), would have qualified directly to the Champions League. As a result, the two vacated berths were replaced by teams from Costa Rica (Santos de Guápiles) and Panama (Tauro), all entering the CONCACAF League as "wild card" teams, based on the performance of the Central American associations in the last five years, giving Costa Rica and Panama three berths each. Guatemala were ultimately reinstated by FIFA on 1 June 2018, and it was decided that the representative of Guatemala in the 2019 CONCACAF Champions League would be decided by a two-legged playoff between Antigua GFC and Guastatoya.

== Draw ==
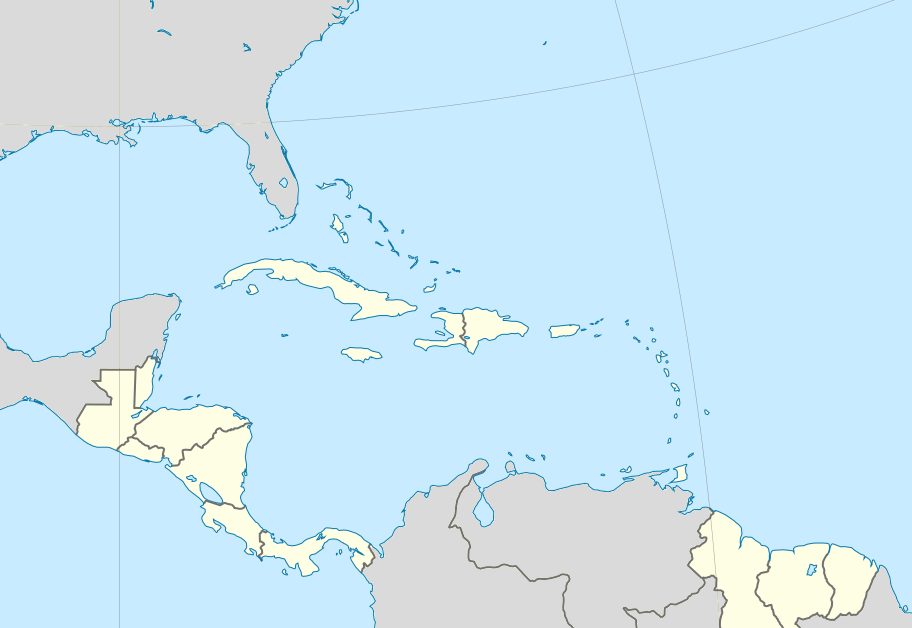
Location of teams of the 2018 CONCACAF League
Central American Zone Caribbean Zone

The draw for the 2018 CONCACAF League was held on 23 May 2018, 19:00 EDT (UTC−4), at the Pullman Hotel in Miami, Florida, United States.

The draw determined each tie in the round of 16 (numbered 1 through 8) between a team from Pot 1 and a team from Pot 2, each containing eight teams. The "Bracket Position Pots" (Pot A and Pot B) contained the bracket positions numbered 1 through 8 corresponding to each tie. The teams from Pot 1 were assigned a bracket position from Pot A and the teams from Pot 2 were assigned a bracket position from Pot B. Teams from the same association could not be drawn against each other in the round of 16 except for "wildcard" teams which replaced a team from another association.

The seeding of teams were based on the CONCACAF Club Index. Each team qualified for the CONCACAF League based on criteria set by the respective associations (e.g., tournament champions, runners-up, cup champions), resulting in an assigned slot (e.g., CRC2, CRC3) for each team. The CONCACAF Club Index, instead of ranking each team, was based on the on-field performance of the teams that have occupied the respective qualifying slots in the previous five editions of the CONCACAF League and CONCACAF Champions League. To determine the total points awarded to a slot in any single edition of the CONCACAF League or CONCACAF Champions League, CONCACAF used the following formula:

Points per	Participation	Win	Draw	Stage advanced	Champions
CONCACAF Champions League (2013–14 – 2018)	4	3	1	1	2
CONCACAF League (2017)	2	3	1	0.5	1

The 16 teams were distributed in the pots as follows:

Pot	Rank	Slot	2013–14 CCL	2014–15 CCL	2015–16 CCL	2016–17 CCL	2017 CL or 2018 CCL	Total	Team
Pot 1	1	CRC2	10	18	9	14	5	56	(Costa Rica) Pérez Zeledón
Pot 1	2	PAN2	7	8	10	8	13	46	(Panama) Universitario
Pot 1	3	SLV2	11	5	6	5	11.5	38.5	(El Salvador) Santa Tecla
Pot 1	4	HON2	4	8	11	11	2	36	(Honduras) Real España
Pot 1	5	CCC2	4	10	7	5	2	28	(Jamaica) Arnett Gardens
Pot 1	6	NCA1	5	6	4	6	5	26	(Nicaragua) Walter Ferretti
Pot 1	7	CCC3	4	4	5	4	5	22	(Jamaica) Portmore United
Pot 1	8	BLZ1	0	0	8	4	2	14	(Belize) Belmopan Bandits
Pot 2	9	PAN3	0	0	0	0	11	11	(Panama) Árabe Unido
Pot 2	10	NCA2	0	0	0	0	9.5	9.5	(Nicaragua) Diriangén
Pot 2	11	SLV3	0	0	0	0	8.5	8.5	(El Salvador) FAS
Pot 2	12	HON3	0	0	0	0	2	2	(Honduras) Motagua
Pot 2	13	CRC3	0	0	0	0	2	2	(Costa Rica) Herediano
Pot 2	14	CCC4	0	0	0	0	2	2	(Martinique) Club Franciscain
Pot 2	15	CRC4	Wildcard team, automatically placed in Pot 2						(Costa Rica) Santos de Guápiles
Pot 2	16	PAN4	Wildcard team, automatically placed in Pot 2						(Panama) Tauro

Notes

1. ^{NCA} The identity of the teams qualifying for the two slots for Nicaragua (NCA1 and NCA2) was not known at the time of the draw.

== Format ==
In the CONCACAF League, the 16 teams played a single-elimination tournament. Each tie was played on a home-and-away two-legged basis.

- In the round of 16, quarter-finals, and semi-finals, the away goals rule would be applied if the aggregate score was tied after the second leg. If still tied, the penalty shoot-out would be used to determine the winner (Regulations II, Article F).
- In the final, the away goals rule would not be applied, and extra time would be played if the aggregate score was tied after the second leg. If the aggregate score was still tied after extra time, the penalty shoot-out would be used to determine the winner (Regulations II, Article G).

== Schedule ==
The schedule of the competition was as follows.

	First leg	Second leg
Round of 16	31 July – 2 August 2018	7–9 August 2018
Quarter-finals	21–23 August 2018	28–30 August 2018
Semi-finals	18–20 September 2018	25–27 September 2018
Final	23–25 October 2018	30 October – 1 November 2018

All times are Eastern Daylight Time, i.e., UTC−4, as listed by CONCACAF (local times are in parentheses).

== Bracket ==
Round of 16
(Costa Rica) Herediano (a)	1	1	2
(El Salvador) Santa Tecla	0	2	2
(Nicaragua) Diriangén	0	1	1
(Panama) Universitario	4	3	7
(El Salvador) FAS	2	1	3
(Costa Rica) Pérez Zeledón	1	1	2
(Panama) Árabe Unido	3	1	4
(Jamaica) Arnett Gardens	0	2	2
(Panama) Tauro	1	1	2
(Honduras) Real España	0	1	1
(Martinique) Club Franciscain	1	0	1 (1)
(Nicaragua) Walter Ferretti (p)	0	1	1 (4)
(Honduras) Motagua	2	1	3
(Belize) Belmopan Bandits	0	0	0
(Costa Rica) Santos de Guápiles	1	2	3 (6)
(Jamaica) Portmore United (p)	2	1	3 (7)

Quarter-finals
(Costa Rica) Herediano	3	2	5
(Panama) Universitario	0	1	1
(El Salvador) FAS	0	1	1
(Panama) Árabe Unido	1	3	4
(Panama) Tauro	3	4	7
(Nicaragua) Walter Ferretti	1	0	1
(Honduras) Motagua	3	2	5
(Jamaica) Portmore United	2	0	2

Semi-finals
(Costa Rica) Herediano	2	0	2
(Panama) Árabe Unido	0	1	1
(Panama) Tauro	2	0	2
(Honduras) Motagua	1	2	3

Final
(Costa Rica) Herediano	2	1	3
(Honduras) Motagua	0	2	2

== Round of 16 ==
In the round of 16, the matchups were decided by draw: R16-1 through R16-8. The teams from Pot 1 in the draw hosted the second leg.

=== Summary ===
The first legs were played on 31 July – 2 August, and the second legs were played on 7–9 August 2018.

Team 1	Agg.	Team 2	1st leg	2nd leg
Santos de Guápiles (Costa Rica)	3–3 (6–7 p)	(Jamaica) Portmore United	1–2	2–1
Motagua (Honduras)	3–0	(Belize) Belmopan Bandits	2–0	1–0
Club Franciscain (Martinique)	1–1 (1–4 p)	(Nicaragua) Walter Ferretti	1–0	0–1
Tauro (Panama)	2–1	(Honduras) Real España	1–0	1–1
Árabe Unido (Panama)	4–2	(Jamaica) Arnett Gardens	3–0	1–2
FAS (El Salvador)	3–2	(Costa Rica) Pérez Zeledón	2–1	1–1
Diriangén (Nicaragua)	1–7	(Panama) Universitario	0–4	1–3
Herediano (Costa Rica)	2–2 (a)	(El Salvador) Santa Tecla	1–0	1–2

=== Matches ===
1 August 2018
22:00 (20:00 UTC−6)

Santos de Guápiles (Costa Rica)	1–2	(Jamaica) Portmore United
Arboine 80' (pen.)	Report	East 14'; Foster 18'

Estadio Nacional de Costa Rica, San José
Referee: Trevester Richards (Saint Kitts and Nevis)
9 August 2018
19:30 (18:30 UTC−5)

Portmore United (Jamaica)	1–2	(Costa Rica) Santos de Guápiles
Foster 45'	Report	Dinolis 30'; López 42'
Penalties
Foster (penalty scored); Johnson (penalty scored); Solomon (penalty missed); Evans (penalty scored); Morris (penalty scored); East (penalty scored); Willis (penalty scored); Harriott (penalty scored)	7–6	(penalty scored) Azofeifa; (penalty scored) Arboine; (penalty scored) Rodríguez; (penalty scored) Matarrita; (penalty missed) Madrigal; (penalty scored) Solórzano; (penalty scored) Barquero; (penalty missed) Salas

National Stadium, Kingston
Referee: Fernando Hernández (Mexico)

3–3 on aggregate. Portmore United won 7–6 on penalties.

31 July 2018
22:00 (20:00 UTC−6)

Motagua (Honduras)	2–0	(Belize) Belmopan Bandits
López 47'; Galvaliz 78'	Report

Estadio Tiburcio Carías Andino, Tegucigalpa
Referee: Iván Barton (El Salvador)
7 August 2018
20:00 (18:00 UTC−6)

Belmopan Bandits (Belize)	0–1	(Honduras) Motagua
	Report	Moreira 56'

Isidoro Beaton Stadium, Belmopan
Referee: Juan Gabriel Calderón (Costa Rica)

Motagua won 3–0 on aggregate.

1 August 2018
20:00 (20:00 UTC−4)

Club Franciscain (Martinique)	1–0	(Nicaragua) Walter Ferretti
Marajo 69'	Report

Stade Pierre-Aliker, Fort-de-France
Referee: Reon Radix (Grenada)
8 August 2018
20:00 (18:00 UTC−6)

Walter Ferretti (Nicaragua)	1–0	(Martinique) Club Franciscain
Chávez 79'	Report
Penalties
Zúñiga (penalty scored); Aguirre (penalty scored); Espinoza (penalty scored); Montiel (penalty scored)	4–1	(penalty missed) Ephestion; (penalty missed) Jougon; (penalty scored) Etinof

Estadio Eladio Rosabal Cordero, Heredia (Costa Rica) (Note: All home matches of Nicaraguan teams Walter Ferretti and Diriangén were required to be played outside of their country due to security concerns caused by civil unrest in Nicaragua.)
Referee: Oshane Nation (Jamaica)

1–1 on aggregate. Walter Ferretti won 4–1 on penalties.

2 August 2018
20:00 (19:00 UTC−5)

Tauro (Panama)	1–0	(Honduras) Real España
Aguilar 71'	Report

Estadio Agustín Sánchez, La Chorrera
Referee: Ismael Cornejo (El Salvador)
9 August 2018
22:00 (20:00 UTC−6)

Real España (Honduras)	1–1	(Panama) Tauro
Velásquez 45'	Report	Polo 9'

Estadio Olímpico Metropolitano, San Pedro Sula
Referee: Bryan López (Guatemala)

Tauro won 2–1 on aggregate.

31 July 2018
20:00 (19:00 UTC−5)

Árabe Unido (Panama)	3–0	(Jamaica) Arnett Gardens
Hormechea 58', 81'; Murillo 90+7'	Report

Estadio Rommel Fernández, Panama City
Referee: Rubiel Vazquez (United States)
9 August 2018
22:00 (21:00 UTC−5)

Arnett Gardens (Jamaica)	2–1	(Panama) Árabe Unido
Morgan 5'; Neil 64'	Report	Heráldez 29'

National Stadium, Kingston
Referee: Gladwyn Johnson (Guyana)

Árabe Unido won 4–2 on aggregate.

31 July 2018
22:00 (20:00 UTC−6)

FAS (El Salvador)	2–1	(Costa Rica) Pérez Zeledón
Montaño 57'; Stradella 80'	Report	Cazal 2'

Estadio Cuscatlán, San Salvador
Referee: Armando Villarreal (United States)
7 August 2018
22:00 (20:00 UTC−6)

Pérez Zeledón (Costa Rica)	1–1	(El Salvador) FAS
López 62'	Report	Soto 90+5' (o.g.)

Estadio Alejandro Morera Soto, Alajuela
Referee: Oliver Vergara (Panama)

FAS won 3–2 on aggregate.

1 August 2018
20:00 (18:00 UTC−6)

Diriangén (Nicaragua)	0–4	(Panama) Universitario
	Report	Moreno 54' (pen.), 79'; Villarreal 66'; Núñez 77'

Estadio Eladio Rosabal Cordero, Heredia (Costa Rica)
Referee: Keylor Herrera (Costa Rica)
7 August 2018
20:00 (19:00 UTC−5)

Universitario (Panama)	3–1	(Nicaragua) Diriangén
Villarreal 5', 30'; Moreno 77'	Report	Ruiz 86'

Estadio Agustín Sánchez, La Chorrera
Referee: Daneon Parchment (Jamaica)

Universitario won 7–1 on aggregate.

2 August 2018
22:00 (20:00 UTC−6)

Herediano (Costa Rica)	1–0	(El Salvador) Santa Tecla
Díaz 20'	Report

Estadio Eladio Rosabal Cordero, Heredia
Referee: Yadel Martínez (Cuba)
8 August 2018
22:00 (20:00 UTC−6)

Santa Tecla (El Salvador)	2–1	(Costa Rica) Herediano
Torres 16'; Ricardinho 34'	Report	Ruiz 41'

Estadio Cuscatlán, San Salvador
Referee: Saíd Martínez (Honduras)

2–2 on aggregate. Herediano won on away goals.

== Quarter-finals ==
In the quarter-finals, the matchups were determined as follows:

- QF1: Winner R16-1 vs. Winner R16-2
- QF2: Winner R16-3 vs. Winner R16-4
- QF3: Winner R16-5 vs. Winner R16-6
- QF4: Winner R16-7 vs. Winner R16-8

The winners of round of 16 matchups 1, 3, 5, 7 hosted the second leg.

=== Summary ===
The first legs were played on 21–23 August, and the second legs were played on 28–30 August 2018.

Team 1	Agg.	Team 2	1st leg	2nd leg
Motagua (Honduras)	5–2	(Jamaica) Portmore United	3–2	2–0
Tauro (Panama)	7–1	(Nicaragua) Walter Ferretti	3–1	4–0
FAS (El Salvador)	1–4	(Panama) Árabe Unido	0–1	1–3
Herediano (Costa Rica)	5–1	(Panama) Universitario	3–0	2–1

=== Matches ===
23 August 2018
22:00 (20:00 UTC−6)

Motagua (Honduras)	3–2	(Jamaica) Portmore United
Montes 6', 90+5'; Castillo 25'	Report	Morris 67'; East 81'

Estadio Tiburcio Carías Andino, Tegucigalpa
Referee: José Kellys (Panama)
30 August 2018
22:00 (21:00 UTC−5)

Portmore United (Jamaica)	0–2	(Honduras) Motagua
	Report	Castillo 31', 90+2'

National Stadium, Kingston
Referee: David Gantar (Canada)

Motagua won 5–2 on aggregate.

23 August 2018
20:00 (19:00 UTC−5)

Tauro (Panama)	3–1	(Nicaragua) Walter Ferretti
González 12'; Polo 43'; Aguilar 84' (pen.)	Report	Morais 22' (pen.)

Estadio Rommel Fernández, Panama City
Referee: Melvin Matamoros (Honduras)
30 August 2018
20:00 (18:00 UTC−6)

Walter Ferretti (Nicaragua)	0–4	(Panama) Tauro
	Report	Aguilar 9'; Anderson 33'; Small 77'; Polo 90+3' (pen.)

Estadio Eladio Rosabal Cordero, Heredia (Costa Rica)
Referee: Henry Bejarano (Costa Rica)

Tauro won 7–1 on aggregate.

21 August 2018
22:00 (20:00 UTC−6)

FAS (El Salvador)	0–1	(Panama) Árabe Unido
	Report	Gil 88'

Estadio Cuscatlán, San Salvador
Referee: Kimbell Ward (Saint Kitts and Nevis)
28 August 2018
22:00 (21:00 UTC−5)

Árabe Unido (Panama)	3–1	(El Salvador) FAS
Pérez 51', 62'; Gil 76'	Report	Morán 45'

Estadio Rommel Fernández, Panama City
Referee: Ismail Elfath (United States)

Árabe Unido won 4–1 on aggregate.

22 August 2018
22:00 (20:00 UTC−6)

Herediano (Costa Rica)	3–0	(Panama) Universitario
Marín 20'; Ruiz 78', 85'	Report

Estadio Eladio Rosabal Cordero, Heredia
Referee: Erick Miranda (Mexico)
29 August 2018
22:00 (21:00 UTC−5)

Universitario (Panama)	1–2	(Costa Rica) Herediano
Brown 58' (o.g.)	Report	Brown 62'; Ortiz 74'

Estadio Agustín Sánchez, La Chorrera
Referee: Mario Escobar (Guatemala)

Herediano won 5–1 on aggregate.

== Semi-finals ==
In the semi-finals, the matchups were determined as follows:

- SF1: Winner QF1 vs. Winner QF2
- SF2: Winner QF3 vs. Winner QF4

The semi-finalists in each tie which had the better performance in previous rounds hosted the second leg.

Pos	Team	Pld	W	D	L	GF	GA	GD	Pts	Host
1 (SF1)	(Honduras) Motagua	4	4	0	0	8	2	+6	12	2nd leg
2 (SF1)	(Panama) Tauro	4	3	1	0	9	2	+7	10	1st leg
1 (SF2)	(Panama) Árabe Unido	4	3	0	1	8	3	+5	9	2nd leg
2 (SF2)	(Costa Rica) Herediano	4	3	0	1	7	3	+4	9	1st leg

Source: CONCACAF
Rules for classification: 1) Points; 2) Goal difference; 3) Goals scored; 4) Away goals scored; 5) Wins; 6) Away wins; 7) Disciplinary points; 8) Drawing of lots (Regulations II, Article H).

=== Summary ===
The first legs were played on 20 September, and the second legs were played on 27 September 2018.

Team 1	Agg.	Team 2	1st leg	2nd leg
Tauro (Panama)	2–3	(Honduras) Motagua	2–1	0–2
Herediano (Costa Rica)	2–1	(Panama) Árabe Unido	2–0	0–1

=== Matches ===
20 September 2018
20:00 (19:00 UTC−5)

Tauro (Panama)	2–1	(Honduras) Motagua
Aguilar 12', 55' (pen.)	Report	Montes 84'

Estadio Rommel Fernández, Panama City
Referee: Iván Barton (El Salvador)
27 September 2018
22:00 (20:00 UTC−6)

Motagua (Honduras)	2–0	(Panama) Tauro
Moreira 42' (pen.); López 73'	Report

Estadio Tiburcio Carías Andino, Tegucigalpa
Referee: Walter López (Guatemala)

Motagua won 3–2 on aggregate.

20 September 2018
22:00 (20:00 UTC−6)

Herediano (Costa Rica)	2–0	(Panama) Árabe Unido
Ruiz 28' (pen.), 90+2'	Report

Estadio Eladio Rosabal Cordero, Heredia
Referee: Saíd Martínez (Honduras)
27 September 2018
20:00 (19:00 UTC−5)

Árabe Unido (Panama)	1–0	(Costa Rica) Herediano
Palacios 20'	Report

Estadio Rommel Fernández, Panama City
Referee: Oshane Nation (Jamaica)

Herediano won 2–1 on aggregate.

== Final ==
In the final (Winner SF1 vs. Winner SF2), the finalists which had the better performance in previous rounds hosted the second leg.

Pos	Team	Pld	W	D	L	GF	GA	GD	Pts	Host
1	(Honduras) Motagua	6	5	0	1	11	4	+7	15	2nd leg
2	(Costa Rica) Herediano	6	4	0	2	9	4	+5	12	1st leg

Source: CONCACAF
Rules for classification: 1) Points; 2) Goal difference; 3) Goals scored; 4) Away goals scored; 5) Wins; 6) Away wins; 7) Disciplinary points; 8) Drawing of lots (Regulations II, Article H).

=== Summary ===
The first leg was played on 25 October, and the second leg was played on 1 November 2018.

Team 1	Agg.	Team 2	1st leg	2nd leg
Herediano (Costa Rica)	3–2	(Honduras) Motagua	2–0	1–2

=== Matches ===
25 October 2018
22:00 (20:00 UTC−6)

Herediano (Costa Rica)	2–0	(Honduras) Motagua
Marín 23'; Cruz 62'	Report

Estadio Eladio Rosabal Cordero, Heredia
Referee: Marco Ortíz (Mexico)
1 November 2018
22:00 (20:00 UTC−6)

Motagua (Honduras)	2–1	(Costa Rica) Herediano
Castillo 45+1', 58'	Report	Marín 85'

Estadio Tiburcio Carías Andino, Tegucigalpa
Referee: Mario Escobar (Guatemala)

Herediano won 3–2 on aggregate.

== Top goalscorers ==
Team eliminated for this round.

Rank	Player	Team	Goals	By round							
Rank	Player	Team	Goals	1R1	1R2	QF1	QF2	SF1	SF2	F1	F2
1	(Panama) Edwin Aguilar	(Panama) Tauro	5	1		1	1	2			
1	(Honduras) Román Castillo	(Honduras) Motagua	5			1	2				2
1	(Costa Rica) Yendrick Ruiz	(Costa Rica) Herediano	5		1	2		2			
4	(Costa Rica) Jimmy Marín	(Costa Rica) Herediano	3			1				1	1
4	(Honduras) Juan Pablo Montes	(Honduras) Motagua	3			2		1			
4	(Panama) S. Moreno	(Panama) Universitario	3	2	1						
4	(Panama) Armando Polo	(Panama) Tauro	3		1	1	1				
4	(Panama) Óscar Villarreal	(Panama) Universitario	3	1	2						
9	(Jamaica) Jovan East	(Jamaica) Portmore United	2	1		1					
9	(Jamaica) Maalique Foster	(Jamaica) Portmore United	2	1	1						
9	(Colombia) Faber Gil	(Panama) Árabe Unido	2			1	1				
9	(Panama) Chin Hormechea	(Panama) Árabe Unido	2	2							
9	(Honduras) Kevin López	(Honduras) Motagua	2	1					1		
9	(Paraguay) Roberto Moreira	(Honduras) Motagua	2		1				1		
9	(Panama) Blas Pérez	(Panama) Árabe Unido	2				2				

Source:CONCACAF

== Awards ==
The following awards were given at the conclusion of the tournament:

Award	Player	Team
Golden Ball	(Costa Rica) Yendrick Ruiz	(Costa Rica) Herediano
Golden Boot	(Honduras) Román Castillo	(Honduras) Motagua
Golden Glove	(Costa Rica) Leonel Moreira	(Costa Rica) Herediano
Best Young Player	(Costa Rica) Jimmy Marín	(Costa Rica) Herediano
Fair Play Award	—	(Honduras) Motagua

== See also ==
- 2019 CONCACAF Champions League
