= 2016–17 Liga FPD =

Primera División
- Season: 2016–17
- Champions: Invierno: Saprissa (33rd title); Verano: Herediano (26th title)
- Relegated: San Carlos
- Champions League: Saprissa; Herediano
- CONCACAF League: Alajuelense; Santos
- Matches: 290
- Goals: 787 (2.71 per match)
- Top goalscorer: Invierno: Yendrick Ruiz (13 goals); Verano: Erick Scott (22 goals)
- Highest attendance: 19,331; Saprissa 2–0 Alajuelense (29 October 2016)
- Lowest attendance: 139; UCR 0–0 Carmelita (8 January 2017)
- Total attendance: Invierno: 477,867; Verano: 475,996

The 2015–16 Costa Rican FPD is the 96th season of the Costa Rican top-flight football league. It is divided in two championships: the Invierno and Verano seasons.

== Format ==
The season format was changed from previous years. The season will still be split into two tournaments, the Invierno and Verano. Also, each tournament's regular stage will still consist of a double-round robin. However, the top four teams from the regular stage will advance to a "quadrangular" double-round robin instead of a play-off stage. If the team with the most points in regular stage finishes with the most points in the quadrangular, they will automatically win the tournament. Otherwise, the regular stage and quadrangular winners will play to decide the tournament's champion.

== Teams ==
Note: Table lists in alphabetical order.

Team	Location	Stadium	Capacity
Alajuelense	Alajuela	Alejandro Morera Soto	18,000
Belén	Belén	Polideportivo de Belén	3,000
Carmelita	Alajuela	Alejandro Morera Soto	18,000
Cartaginés	Cartago	"Fello" Meza	13,500
Herediano	Heredia	Eladio Rosabal Cordero	8,500
Liberia	Liberia	Edgardo Baltodano	6,000
Limón	Limón	Juan Gobán	3,000
Pérez Zeledón	San Isidro	Municipal Pérez Zeledón	6,000
Santos	Limón	Ebal Rodríguez	3,000
Saprissa	San José	Ricardo Saprissa	23,000
San Carlos	Quesada	Carlos Ugalde Álvarez	5,600
UCR	San José	Estadio Ecológico	1,800

== Invierno ==
=== First stage ===
Pos	Team	Pld	W	D	L	GF	GA	GD	Pts	Qualification
1	Saprissa	22	15	4	3	52	19	+33	49	Advance to the Quadrangular
2	Herediano	22	12	8	2	44	24	+20	44	Advance to the Quadrangular
3	Alajuelense	22	12	3	7	31	20	+11	39	Advance to the Quadrangular
4	Santos de Guápiles	22	10	5	7	30	27	+3	35	Advance to the Quadrangular
5	Cartaginés	22	8	9	5	35	31	+4	33	
6	Limón	22	9	4	9	22	39	−17	31	
7	Carmelita	22	7	5	10	22	33	−11	26	
8	Pérez Zeledón	22	6	6	10	26	27	−1	24	
9	Belén	22	6	5	11	28	38	−10	23	
10	UCR	22	5	7	10	31	38	−7	22	
11	Municipal Liberia	22	4	7	11	27	34	−7	19	
12	San Carlos	22	4	5	13	16	34	−18	17	

Source: RSSSF
Rules for classification: 1) points; 2) goal difference; 3) goals scored; 4) head-to-head points; 5) head-to-head goal difference; 6) head-to-head goals scored; 7) draw

=== Quadrangular ===
Pos	Team	Pld	W	D	L	GF	GA	GD	Pts	Qualification
1	Saprissa	6	4	1	1	11	4	+7	13	2018 CONCACAF Champions League (Note: Since Saprissa won both stages, they won the Invierno outright and no final was needed. Saprissa qualified for the 2018 CONCACAF Champions League as a result.)
2	Herediano	6	3	2	1	12	4	+8	11	
3	Alajuelense	6	1	2	3	7	12	−5	5	
4	Santos de Guápiles	6	1	1	4	4	14	−10	4	

Source: RSSSF
Rules for classification: 1) points; 2) goal difference; 3) goals scored; 4) head-to-head points; 5) head-to-head goal difference; 6) head-to-head goals scored; 7) draw

== Verano ==
=== First stage ===
Pos	Team	Pld	W	D	L	GF	GA	GD	Pts	Qualification
1	Saprissa	22	13	5	4	30	19	+11	44	Advances to the Quadrangular
2	Herediano	22	11	6	5	41	24	+17	39	Advances to the Quadrangular
3	Limón	22	11	4	7	43	31	+12	37	Advances to the Quadrangular
4	Santos de Guápiles	22	9	7	6	32	26	+6	34	Advances to the Quadrangular
5	Pérez Zeledón	22	10	4	8	32	30	+2	34	
6	Cartaginés	22	9	6	7	28	28	0	33	
7	Alajuelense	22	8	7	7	27	23	+4	31	
8	Liberia	22	6	9	7	20	32	−12	27	
9	San Carlos	22	7	3	12	26	34	−8	24	
10	UCR	22	5	7	10	22	33	−11	22	
11	Belén	22	4	7	11	24	37	−13	19	
12	Carmelita	22	4	5	13	21	29	−8	17	

Source: RSSSF
Rules for classification: 1) points; 2) goal difference; 3) goals scored; 4) head-to-head points; 5) head-to-head goal difference; 6) head-to-head goals scored; 7) draw

=== Quadrangular ===
Pos	Team	Pld	W	D	L	GF	GA	GD	Pts	Qualification
1	Herediano	6	3	2	1	11	5	+6	11	2018 CONCACAF Champions League
2	Santos de Guápiles	6	2	2	2	8	6	+2	8	
3	Saprissa	6	2	2	2	11	12	−1	8	
4	Limón	6	2	0	4	8	15	−7	6	

Source: RSSSF
Rules for classification: 1) points; 2) goal difference; 3) goals scored; 4) head-to-head points; 5) head-to-head goal difference; 6) head-to-head goals scored; 7) draw

=== Verano Finals ===
Because different teams won the regular season title and the quadrangular tournament, those two winners, Saprissa and Herediano, will play a two-legged play-off to determine the Verano champions.

17 May 2017
20:15 CST

Herediano	3–0	Saprissa
Arrieta 9'; Núñez 31'; Granados 36'	Report

Eladio Rosabal Cordero
Attendance: 4,669
Referee: Henry Bejarano

21 May 2017
15:00 CST

Saprissa	0–2	Herediano
	Report	66' Arrieta; 87' Núñez

Ricardo Saprissa
Attendance: 15,718
Referee: Hugo Cruz

== Aggregate table ==
The aggregate table only factors in regular season results and ignores the quadrangular tournaments.

Pos	Team	Pld	W	D	L	GF	GA	GD	Pts	Qualification or relegation
1	Saprissa	44	28	9	7	82	38	+44	93	2018 CONCACAF Champions League
2	Herediano	44	23	14	7	85	48	+37	83	2018 CONCACAF Champions League (Note: Due to Guatemala's suspension from FIFA, its teams will not participate in the 2017-18 CONCACAF club competitions. Due to this, Costa Rica gained an additional qualifier for the 2018 CONCACAF Champions League.)
3	Alajuelense	44	20	10	14	58	14	+44	70	2017 CONCACAF League
4	Santos de Guápiles	44	19	12	13	63	53	+10	69	2017 CONCACAF League
5	Limón	44	20	8	16	65	70	−5	68	
6	Cartaginés	44	17	15	12	63	59	+4	66	
7	Pérez Zeledón	44	16	10	18	58	57	+1	58	
8	Municipal Liberia	44	10	16	18	47	66	−19	46	
9	UCR	44	10	14	20	53	71	−18	44	
10	Carmelita	44	11	10	23	43	62	−19	43	
11	Belén	44	10	12	22	52	75	−23	42	
12	San Carlos (R)	44	11	8	25	42	68	−26	41	Relegation to the 2017–18 Segunda División

Source: RSSSF
Rules for classification: 1) points; 2) goal difference; 3) goals scored; 4) head-to-head points; 5) head-to-head goal difference; 6) head-to-head goals scored; 7) draw
(R) Relegated

== Awards ==
On 31 May 2017, the UNAFUT held a ceremony in the national auditorium of the Museo de los Niños to deliver the Liga FPD awards for the season.

=== Per individual tournament ===
Category	Season	
Category	Invierno 2016	Verano 2017
Champions	Saprissa (33rd title)	Herediano (26th title)
Runners-up	Herediano (20th time)	Saprissa (15th time)
Dedicated to	(Costa Rica) Rodolfo Ferguson	(Uruguay) Orlando de León
Goalscorer	(Costa Rica) Yendrick Ruiz (Herediano)	(Costa Rica) Erick Scott (Limón)
Best player	(Costa Rica) Marvin Angulo (Saprissa)	(Costa Rica) Randall Azofeifa (Herediano)
Best U-21 player	(Costa Rica) Gerson Torres (Herediano)	(Costa Rica) Jimmy Marín (Herediano)
Best manager	(Costa Rica) Carlos Watson (Saprissa)	(Costa Rica) Hernán Medford (Herediano)
Best goalkeeper	(Costa Rica) Danny Carvajal (Saprissa)	(Costa Rica) Leonel Moreira (Herediano)
Best foreign player	(Panama) Adolfo Machado (Saprissa)	(Mexico) Luis Ángel Landín (Pérez Zeledón)
Best goal	(Costa Rica) Marvin Angulo (Saprissa)	(Costa Rica) Carlos Hernández (Carmelita)
Most disciplined team	Cartaginés	Pérez Zeledón
Best movers	Santos de Guápiles	Pérez Zeledón

=== Per overall season ===
Award	Winner
Special tribute^{1}	Danny Fonseca (Cartaginés – 600 appearances); Víctor Núñez (Herediano – 500 appearances); Félix Montoya (Liberia – 500 appearances)
Best save	Leonel Moreira (Herediano)
Arbitration work	Ricardo Montero; Rafael Andrade; Juan Carlos Mora; Juan Gabriel Calderón; Honorific mentions: Wálter Quesada; Adrián Jiménez
Fair play award	Minor Álvarez^{2} (Pérez Zeledón)

^{1} Awarded to the mentioned players due to their number of matches played in the Liga FPD.
^{2} Goalkeeper Minor Álvarez received the award for aiding San Carlos' Érick Zúñiga during the last matchday of the Verano 2017 season, at the cost of receiving a goal during his action.

== Attendances ==
Team	Home average
Deportivo Saprissa	9,228
Alajuelense	8,807
CS Herediano	4,247
CS Cartaginés	3,874
AD San Carlos	2,261
Municipal Liberia	1,786
Municipal Pérez Zeledón	1,375
Limón FC	1,176
Santos de Guápiles	1,121
Universidad de Costa Rica	968
AD Carmelita	862
Belén FC	564
