= Sergio Moreno (footballer, born 1992) =

Panamanian footballer

Personal information
- Full name: Sergio Jordan Moreno Aparicio
- Date of birth: 28 July 1992 (age 34)
- Place of birth: Panama City, Panama
- Height: 1.73 m (5 ft 8 in)
- Position: Midfielder

Youth career
- Chorrillo

Senior career*
Years	Team	Apps	(Gls)
2012–2016	Chorrillo	97	(31)
2016–2017	Deportivo Municipal	64	(10)
2017–2019	Universitario	52	(17)
2019–2020	Al-Kawkab		
2020	Al-Riyadh		
2020	Universitario	8	(1)
2021–2022	San Francisco		
2023	Santos de Guápiles	10	(1)

International career
2016	Panama	1	(0)
- * Club domestic league appearances and goals as of 19:19, 10 August 2023 (UTC)

Sergio Jordan Moreno Aparicio (born 28 July 1992) is a Panamanian international footballer who plays as a midfielder.

== Career ==
Born in Panama City, Moreno has played for Chorrillo, Deportivo Municipal, Unión Deportivo Universitario, Al-Kawkab and Al-Riyadh.

He made his international debut for Panama in 2016.
