= Yendrick Ruiz =

Costa Rican footballer (born 1987)

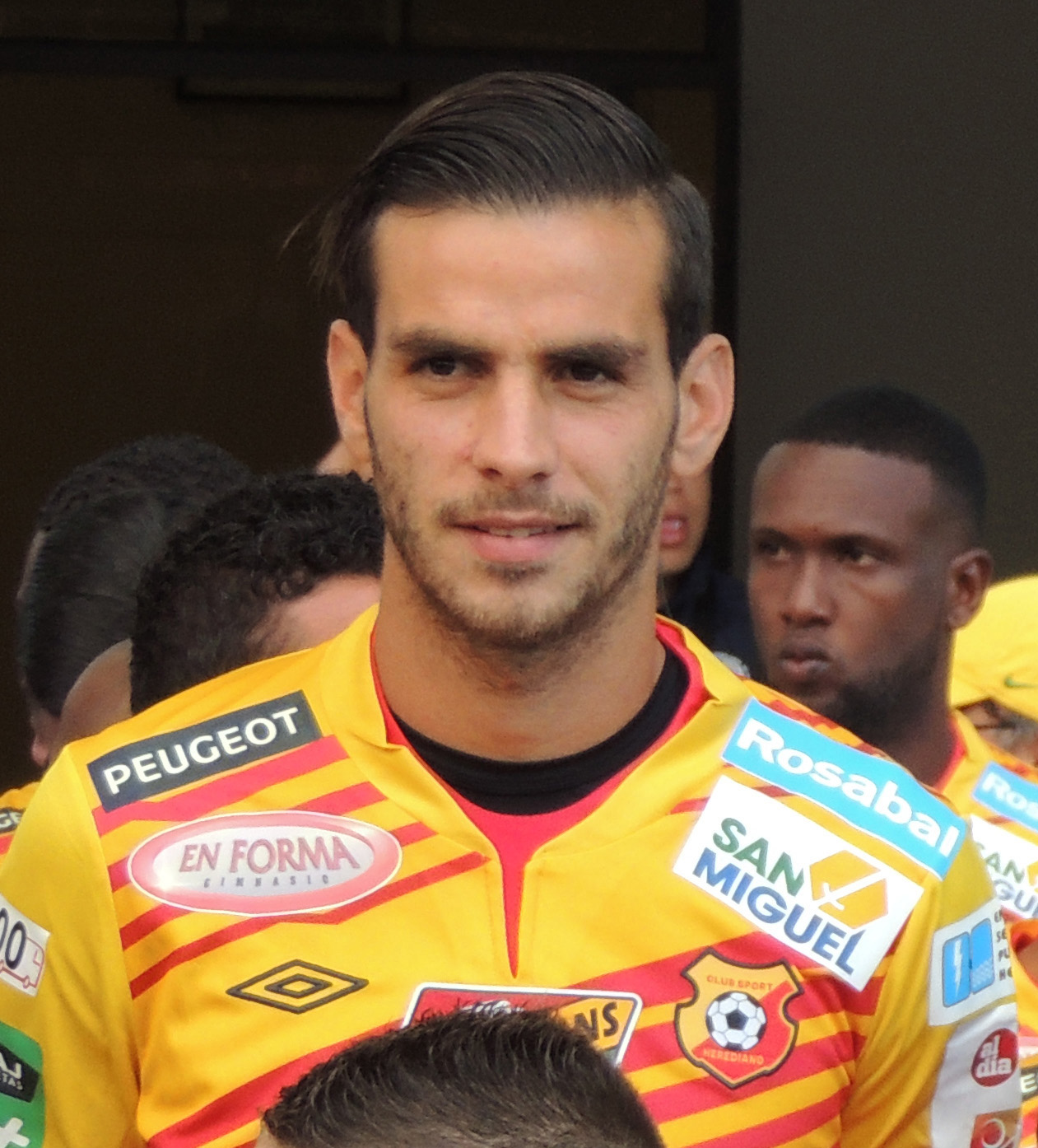
- Ruiz with Herediano in 2015

Personal information
- Full name: Yendrick Alberto Ruiz González
- Date of birth: 4 December 1987 (age 38)
- Place of birth: San José, Costa Rica
- Height: 1.85 m (6 ft 1 in)
- Position: Forward

Team information
- Current team: Herediano
- Number: 7

Youth career
- 2006–2008: Alajuelense

Senior career*
Years	Team	Apps	(Gls)
2008–2009	Alajuelense		
2010	Brujas	3	(0)
2010	Alajuela Junior		
2011	Puntarenas	36	(13)
2012–2019	Herediano	165	(71)
2015	→ Pune City (loan)	9	(0)
2017	→ Chiangmai (loan)	21	(7)
2019	Oriente Petrolero	15	(3)
2020–	Herediano	81	(26)

International career^{‡}
2013–	Costa Rica	6	(0)
- * Club domestic league appearances and goals as of 19:21, 13 June 2022 (UTC) ‡ National team caps and goals as of 23 March 2018

Yendrick Alberto Ruiz González (San José, Costa Rica, 12 April 1987) is a Costa Rican professional football player who plays as a forward for Liga FPD club Herediano. He is the younger brother of footballer Bryan Ruiz.

He made his international debut for Costa Rica on May 28, 2013, in a friendly against Canada.

== Honours ==
Herediano

- Liga FPD: Clausura 2013, Clausura 2015, Clausura 2016, Apertura 2018, Apertura 2019
- CONCACAF League: 2018

Individual

- Liga FPD Top Scorer: 2014–15 Invierno, 2015–16 Verano, 2016–17 Invierno
- CONCACAF League Golden Ball: 2018
- CONCACAF League Golden Boot (Shared): 2018
