= Kevin Fajardo =

Costa Rican footballer (born 1989)

Personal information
- Full name: Kevin José Fajardo Martínez
- Date of birth: 5 September 1989 (age 37)
- Place of birth: Guápiles, Costa Rica
- Height: 1.80 m (5 ft 11 in)
- Position: Centre back

Team information
- Current team: Pérez Zeledón
- Number: 3

Youth career
- Santos de Guápiles

Senior career*
Years	Team	Apps	(Gls)
2009–2015	Santos de Guápiles	145	(12)
2015	Coban Imperial	13	(1)
2015–2018	Cartaginés	61	(8)
2018	Carmelita	10	(1)
2018	→ Cartaginés (loan)	10	(0)
2018–2019	Municipal Grecia	51	(7)
2020–2022	Jicaral	73	(4)
2022	San Carlos	15	(0)
2023	Sporting	18	(2)
2024–	Pérez Zeledón	55	(2)

International career
2011	Costa Rica	1	(0)
- * Club domestic league appearances and goals as of 3 May 2025

Kevin José Fajardo Martínez (born 5 September 1989) is a Costa Rican football defender who plays for Pérez Zeledón.

== International career ==
He was included in the Costa Rica national football team for the 2011 Copa América, but did not play at all in the tournament.
