= Damano Solomon =

Jamaican footballer (born 1994)

Personal information
- Full name: Damano Rio Solomon
- Date of birth: 13 October 1994 (age 32)
- Place of birth: Kingston, Jamaica
- Height: 1.82 m (6 ft 0 in)
- Position: Defender

Senior career*
Years	Team	Apps	(Gls)
2012–2013	Sporting Central Academy	4	(0)
2013–2019	Portmore United	99	(3)
2019	UWI FC	11	(0)
2020–2021	Portmore United	10	(1)

International career^{‡}
2018–	Jamaica	2	(0)
- * Club domestic league appearances and goals as of 11:35, 9 June 2020 (UTC) ‡ National team caps and goals as of 11:35, 9 June 2020 (UTC)

Damano Rio Solomon (born 13 October 1994) is a Jamaican international footballer who plays as a defender.

== Career ==
Born in Kingston, Solomon has played club football for Sporting Central Academy, Portmore United and UWI FC.

He made his international debut for Jamaica in 2018.
