= Guilherme Farinha =

Portuguese manager

Personal information
- Full name: Guilherme Adolfo Almeida Farinha
- Date of birth: 11 February 1956 (age 70)
- Place of birth: Lisbon, Portugal

Managerial career
- Years: Team
- 1985–1986: Fanhões U19
- 1988–1989: Oliveira do Hospital
- 1990–1994: Guinea-Bissau
- 1994–1995: Praiense
- 1995–1996: Horta
- 1997–1999: Cerro Corá
- 1999–2001: Alajuelense
- 2001–2002: Casa Pia
- 2002–2003: Académico Viseu
- 2003: Cerro Corá
- 2003–2005: Casa Pia
- 2005: Sportivo Luqueño
- 2005: Herediano
- 2005–2006: Loures
- 2008: Foolad
- 2010–2013: Municipal
- 2013–2015: Carmelita
- 2015: Deportivo Cartagena
- 2015–2016: UCR
- 2016: LD Alajuelense
- 2017: Carmelita
- 2018: Turrialba
- 2019: Carmelita
- 2023-2024: Carmelita (assistant)
- 2024: Carmelita (interim)

Guilherme Adolfo Almeida Farinha (born 11 February 1956) is a Portuguese manager who most recently was in charge of Costa Rican side Carmelita.

In May 2013, Farinha was announced as the new manager of Costa Rican side Liga Deportiva Alajuelense.
