= Estadio Carlos Ugalde Álvarez =

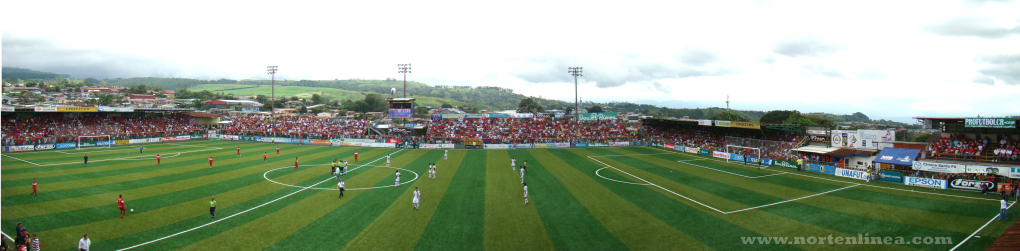
- Interactive map of Estadio Carlos Ugalde Álvarez
- Location: Ciudad Quesada, Costa Rica
- Coordinates: 10.324119°N 84.423867°W
- Capacity: 4,080
- Surface: Artificial
- Field size: 100 x 72 m

Construction
- Opened: 1966
- Renovated: 2010

Tenant
- A.D. San Carlos

Estadio Carlos Ugalde Álvarez is a multi-use stadium in Ciudad Quesada, Costa Rica. It is currently used mostly for football matches and is the home stadium of A.D. San Carlos. The stadium holds 5,600 people.

== History ==
The first game at the stadium was on 24 April 1966, with San Carlos losing 1-0 to Cartaginés with Carlos García scoring the first even goal at the venue. In September 2009, the stadium hosted its 600th Primera División match.
