= Belén F.C. =

Association football club in Costa Rica

Escorpiones
- Full name: Escorpiones de Belén Fútbol Club
- Nickname: Belemitas
- Founded: 10 July 2021; 5 years ago
- Ground: Estadio Polideportivo de Belén
- Capacity: 4,500
- Owner: Jorge España
- Manager: Andrés Arias
- League: Liga de Ascenso
- Clausura 2022: 5° - Grupo A
Home colours	Away colours

Escorpiones de Belén Fútbol Club is a soccer club from the city of Belén, in the province of Heredia in Costa Rica, which plays in the Second Division of that country. It will play in the Liga de Ascenso after the acquisition of the San Ramón Municipal franchise

== Honours ==
- Costa Rican Cup
  - Winners (1): 1996

== History ==
Former badge

- 1979 (13 June): Asociación Deportiva Belén is founded. A.D. Belen will go on to become the second team in the province of Heredia to participate in Primera División the First Division of Costa Rica.
- 1987: Using the name "Belén-Calle Flores" (Bethlehem, Street of Flowers), Belén wins the title of the National Association of Soccer as well as the title of the National Association of Amateur Soccer (ANAFA), and is placed in Segunda División de Costa Rica, the Second Division of Costa Rica, under the leadership of head coach Enrique "Quique" Vasquez.
- 1993: Belén, led by coach Armando Rodríguez, is proclaimed Division II National Champion defeating Sagrada Familia 4–2 in the final round.
- 1993–94: A.D. Belén officially debuts in Primera División, Division I, and plays in the old national stadium but loses to Deportivo Saprissa 4–1. Belén talent Eusebio Montero wins the World Youth Cup in Saudi Arabia.
- 1995–96: Head coach Alexander Guimaraes guides Belén to a fifth-place finish in the championships as the team wins 50% of its games. This is Belén's best finish in Division I. 1996–97 head coach Carlos Santana will match this feat.
- 1996 (2 June): Under head coach Alexandre Guimarães, former player in the FIFA World Cup A.D. Belén wins the last game of the Torneo de Copa en Costa Rica, beating Club Sport Cartaginés, 1–0.
- 1997–98: The team returns to the second division.
- 1998: The entire community of Belén receives honor when A.D. Belén participates for the first time in an international competition, the CONCACAF Winners Cup. In the first phase, under coach "Quique" Vasquez, Belén eliminates Diriangen Nicaragua (2–1 and 3–2). But in the second stage the team stumbles to rival Olympia Honduras (3–0).
- 2003: Under strategist Mario Solis, A.D. Belén ascends to Division I again following the team's triumph over Cartagena in the final.
- 2004–05: Belén drops back down to the second division. The last head coach in the premier division is Benjamin Mayorga.
- 2010–11: Led by Vinicio Alvarado and playing at Polideportivo de Belén, Belén Siglo XXI wins "El Campeonato de la Liga de Ascenso," the National Championship of the League of Ascension, defeating Cartagena, 3–0. And the team is promoted back to Division I.
- 2011 (31 July): A.D. Belén begins competing in Torneo de Invierno Campeonato Nacional de Invierno, the Winter National Championship Tournament, now under the name Belén Bridgestone F.C.
- 2017 (24 April) the team was relocated to Guadalupe suburb in San José city and renamed as Guadalupe F.C.
- 2021 (10 July) For the 2021–2022 season, the canton of Belén, under the name of Escorpiones, reappears in the Second Division of Costa Rican soccer, after the purchase of the Cartagena franchise, which was playing under the name of San Ramón in the Liga de Ascenso since 2016.

== Current squad ==
As of July 24, 2023

Note: Flags indicate national team as defined under FIFA eligibility rules; some limited exceptions apply. Players may hold more than one non-FIFA nationality.

No.	Pos.	Nation	Player
1	GK	CRC	Ricardo Montenegro
3	DF	CRC	Erick Rojas
4	MF	NCA	Nendali Mendoza
5	MF	COL	Cesar Acuña
6	MF	CRC	Jedwin Lester
8	FW	CRC	Randy Chirino
9	FW	CRC	José Rodolfo Montiel
10	MF	CRC	Greivin Fonseca
11	MF	CRC	Anderson Fernández
12	DF	CRC	Rutsell Mora
13	DF	CRC	Jameson Scott
15	MF	CRC	Jairo Vargas

No.	Pos.	Nation	Player
16	FW	CRC	Lopsang Balmaceda
17	FW	CRC	Josue Martínez (Captain)
19	MF	CRC	Josue Serrano
21	MF	CRC	Verny Scott
23	GK	CRC	Anyelo Fernández
24	MF	CRC	Jecxy Jarquín
25	GK	CRC	Allan Jiménez
29	MF	CRC	Josue Abarca
30	MF	CRC	Abner Hidalgo
—	MF	CRC	Jordy Hernández
—	FW	CRC	Erick Zúñiga
