= Estadio Ricardo Saprissa Aymá =

Football stadium in San José, Costa Rica

- La Cueva del Monstruo "The Monster's Cave"
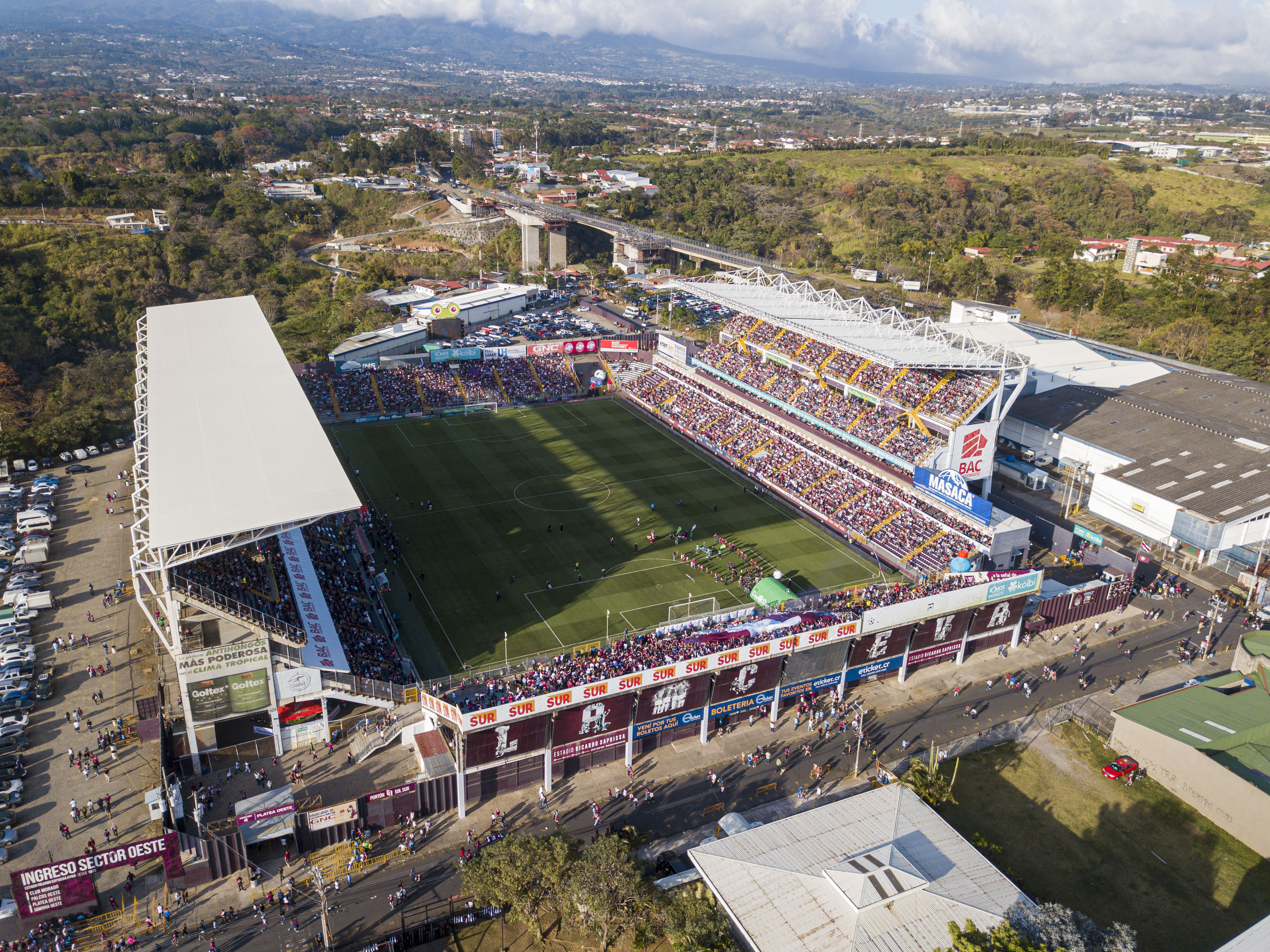
- Interactive map of Estadio Ricardo Saprissa Aymá
- Location: San Juan de Tibás, Costa Rica
- Coordinates: 9.965427°N 84.075455°W
- Capacity: 23,112
- Surface: Grass 1972 to 2003; Artificial turf 2004 to 2014; Grass 2015 to present
- Field size: 105 x 68 m

Construction
- Opened: August 27, 1972

Tenants
- Deportivo Saprissa (1972–present); Costa Rica national football team

Estadio Ricardo Saprissa Aymá is a football stadium in San Juan de Tibás, with a seating capacity of 23,112, making it the second-largest stadium in the country.

The stadium is the home of Deportivo Saprissa, and was named in honor of the team's founder Ricardo Saprissa. The stadium's nickname "The Monster's Cave" (La Cueva del Monstruo) is derived from the team's nickname "The Purple Monster".

== History ==
Saprissa originally played at the Estadio Nacional de Costa Rica (Costa Rica National Stadium), a rented and shared facility. It was Costa Rica's first national stadium.

In 1955, Ricardo Saprissa sought out a permanent site which could serve the training ground and competition play location needs of Deportivo Saprissa. He had several qualities he wanted in the site: a location with easy access from the capital city of San Jose and provincial cities such as Alajuela, Cartago, and Heredia. On 3 August 1965, he bought a site in San Juan de Tibás for ₡363,398.90. On 12 October 1966, the initial construction program was a football pitch with stands. On 27 August 1972, following a six-year construction and improvement program, Estadio Ricardo Saprissa was officially opened. The first match was between Deportivo Saprissa and Comunicaciones of Guatemala. Peter Sandoval of Comunicaciones made the first goal at the stadium. The match ended in a 1-1 draw.

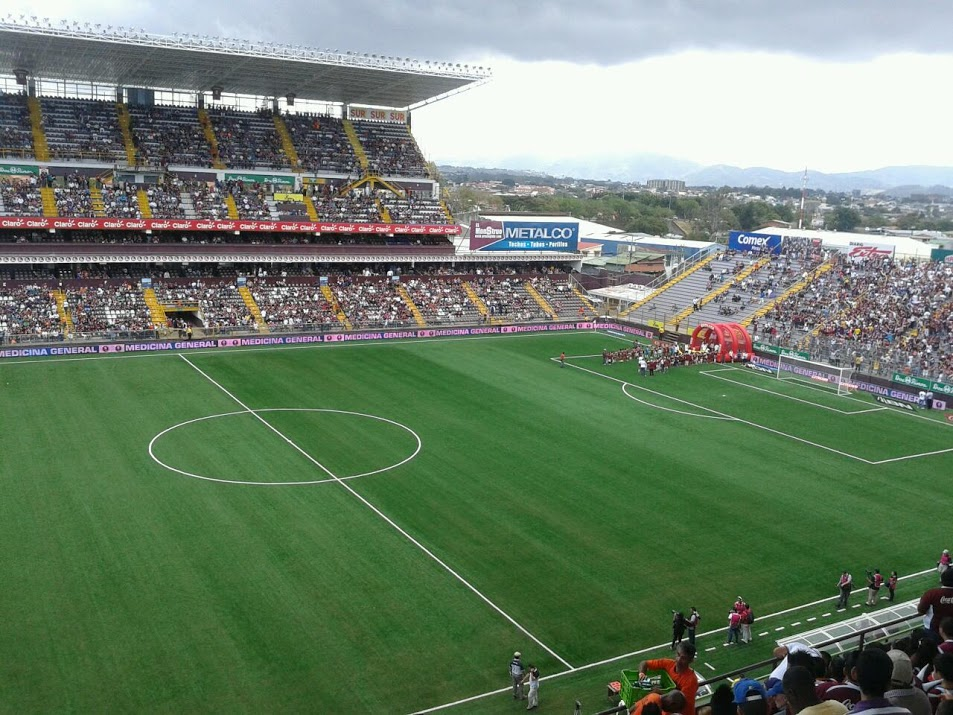
Interior view of the stadium, 2014

In 2003, the long tropical rainy season at the stadium caused Saprissa to apply and be granted by FIFA, permission to change the pitch from natural grass to synthetic turf, the then-only stadium in Latin America to have this type of turf. The stadium has also been used for Costa Rica national football team matches. It is the second-largest football stadium in Costa Rica after Estadio Nacional de Costa Rica (the current national stadium). The local mountains and downtown San José overlook Estadio Saprissa.

In 2005, the stadium became the world's first to host a World Cup qualifying match on FieldTurf. The team replaced the FieldTurf field with a new natural playing surface in 2015. The stadium also regularly hosts concerts by local and international artists. It was used to host matches during the 2020 FIFA U-20 Women's World Cup with the country and Panama.

The stadium is seen with infamy by players of the United States men's national soccer team. On numerous occasions, Alexi Lalas has described the stadium as the most "difficult" and "intimidating" to play at; even depicting it as "daunting . . . worse than Azteca." Landon Donovan called the stadium his favorite, noting "you only think to get out of there alive." During an interview with CONCACAF, Costa Rican captain Bryan Ruiz, who was Clint Dempsey's teammate at Fulham, said Dempsey hated the stadium because of the proximity of the stands and the artificial turf.

== See also ==
- Lists of stadiums
