= Estadio Ebal Rodríguez =

Coordinates: 10°12′41″N 83°47′23″W

Estadio Ebal Rodriguez
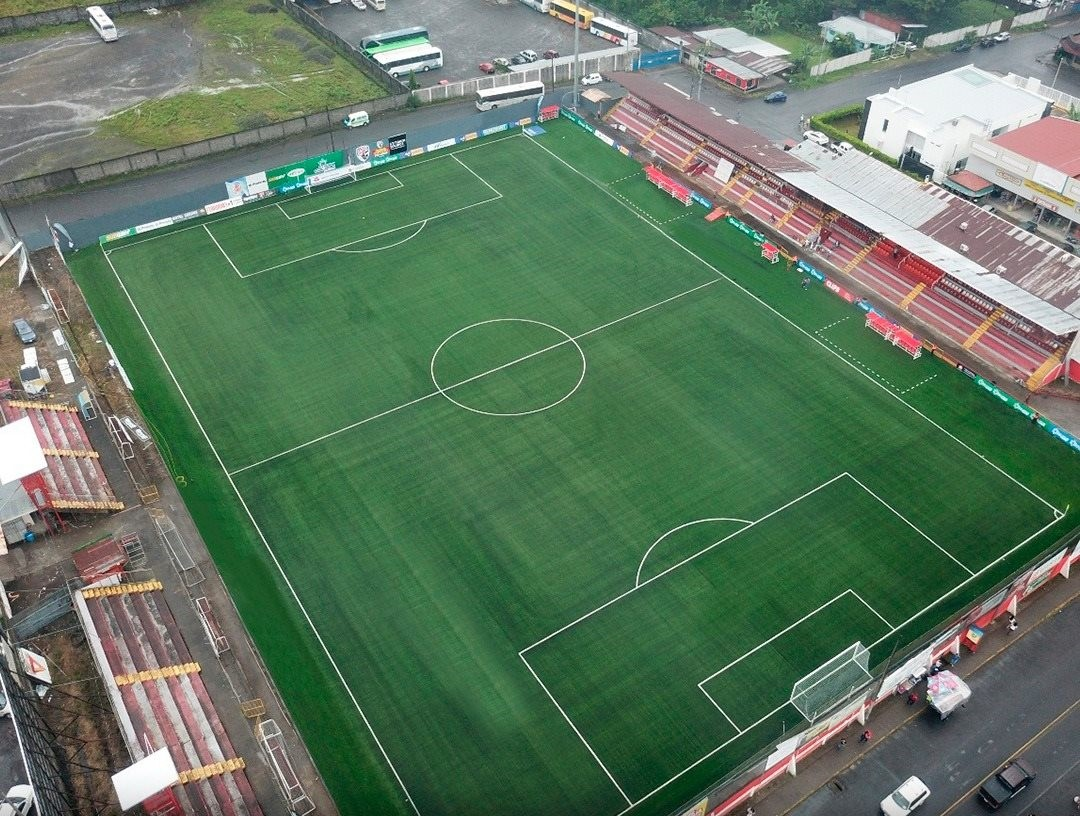
- Interactive map of Estadio Ebal Rodriguez
- Full name: Estadio Ebal Rodriguez Aguilar
- Location: Guápiles, Costa Rica
- Owner: Municipal de Guápiles
- Capacity: 2,250
- Surface: Artificial turf
- Field size: 105 x 75 m

Construction
- Opened: 1964
- Renovated: 2009-2010
- Expanded: 2010

Tenant
- Santos de Guápiles

Estadio Ebal Rodriguez is a multi-use stadium in Guápiles, Costa Rica. It is currently used mostly for football matches and is the home stadium of Santos de Guápiles. The stadium holds 3,000 people.

== History ==
Alajuelense's Wilson Muñoz scored the first Primera División goal scored in the stadium in a 1999 4-0 league win over the hosts.

The stadium is currently undergoing a number of renovations. An artificial pitch has been installed, the building was newly painted, the transmission cabins were improved and a roof for the main stand will follow up. The offices will also be remodeled. US$20,000 will also be invested in seeking the inspection and approval of the stadium by FIFA for international games.
