= Santos de Guápiles =

Association football club in Costa Rica

Santos
- Full name: Asociación Deportiva Santos
- Nicknames: Los Guapileños (The Guapileños); Rojiblancos (The Red and Whites); La Marea Roja (Red Tide)
- Founded: 1961; 65 years ago
- Ground: Estadio Ebal Rodríguez; Guápiles, Costa Rica
- Capacity: 3,000
- Manager: Randall Row
- League: Liga Promerica
- Clausura 2023: 8°
Home colours	Away colours

Asociación Deportiva Santos, commonly known simply as Santos de Guápiles, is a Costa Rican association football club, which played in the Liga FPD.

The club plays in Estadio Ebal Rodríguez in Guápiles, Limón, Costa Rica.

== History ==
The club was founded in 1961 and have never been league champions. They were runner-up twice, in 2001–02 and in the 2012 Verano championship. They reached the top tier after winning promotion in 1999 after beating Municipal Liberia in a May 1999 play-off final marred by violence off the pitch.

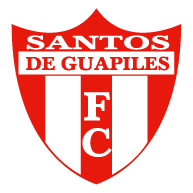
Former club crest

=== Licensing issues ===
In late 2025, Santos and Guanacasteca were disqualified from the 2025–26 Liga FPD by the Licensing Committee of the Costa Rican Football Federation (FCRF) after both teams failed to meet financial requirements to compete. This led to the next season of the Liga FPD having 10 teams instead of 12.

== Stadium ==
Santos play their home games in the Estadio Ebal Rodríguez, where Alajuelense's Wilson Muñoz scored the first Primera División goal in a 1999 4–0 league win over the hosts.

== Current squad ==
As of 28 August, 2024

Note: Flags indicate national team as defined under FIFA eligibility rules; some limited exceptions apply. Players may hold more than one non-FIFA nationality.

No.	Pos.	Nation	Player
1	GK	CRC	Brayan Morales
3	DF	CRC	Jhamir Ordain
4	DF	CRC	Kendrick Enríquez
5	DF	PAN	Reyniel Perdomo (on loan from Alianza Panama)
7	FW	COL	Cristian Zúñiga
8	MF	CRC	Denilson Mason
9	FW	HON	Joshua Canales (on loan from Herediano)
11	MF	CRC	Reimond Salas
12	MF	CRC	Jefferson Sánchez
14	MF	CRC	Gustavo Méndez (on loan from San Carlos)
15	MF	CRC	Davis Paniagua
16	MF	CRC	Isaac Salas
19	FW	CRC	Marvin Chinchilla

No.	Pos.	Nation	Player
20	DF	CRC	Armando Ruiz
21	DF	CRC	Juan Diego Madrigal
23	GK	CRC	Alejandro Barrientos
25	DF	SLV	Adán Clímaco
26	DF	CRC	Jordan Smith
28	MF	CRC	Randy Chirino
29	DF	CRC	Rigoberto Jiménez
30	GK	CRC	Iker Sanabria
31	GK	CRC	Alexandre Lezcano (on loan from Herediano)
53	FW	PAN	Juan Villalobos (on loan from Árabe Unido)
70	FW	COL	Lorenzo Orellano
79	DF	PAN	Óscar Linton
91	DF	CRC	Jordy Evans
