= Costa Rican football clubs in international competitions =

This is a list of Costa Rican football clubs in international competitions. Costa Rican clubs have participated in competitive international soccer competitions since at least 1962 for the first CONCACAF Champions' Cup.

Costa Rican teams have traditionally been one of the more successful group of teams in the CONCACAF Champions Cup, winning the title six times and having five runners-up.

== Who qualifies for CONCACAF competitions ==
Since 2024, Costa Rican teams do not directly qualify for the CONCACAF Champions Cup. The top four finishers of the Liga FPD, the top tier of football in Costa Rica, qualify for the CONCACAF Central American Cup, which is a regional tournament. If a Costa Rican team finishes in the top six, they earn a berth into the CONCACAF Champions Cup.

== Results by competition ==
=== FIFA Club World Cup ===
Year	Team	Progress	Score	Opponent
2005	Saprissa	Third place	3–2	(Saudi Arabia) Al-Ittihad

=== CONCACAF Champions' Cup / Champions League ===
Year	Team	Progress	Aggregate	Opponents	Results
1962	Alajuelense	Second round	4–5	(Guatemala) Comunicaciones	3–2 home, 1–3 away
1962	Herediano	First round	0–5	(Mexico) Guadalajara	0–3 home, 0–2 away
1963	Saprissa	Semi-finals	0–3	(Mexico) Guadalajara	0–1 home, 0–2 away
1967	none entered				
1968	Alajuelense	First round	1–2	(Guatemala) Aurora	0–2 home, 1–0 away
1969	Saprissa	Semi-finals	3–4	(Mexico) Cruz Azul	2–2 home, 1–2 away
1970	Saprissa	Semi-finals	w/o	(Mexico) Cruz Azul	withdrew
1971	Alajuelense	Final	1–5	(Mexico) Cruz Azul	
1971	Saprissa	Second round	4–5	(Costa Rica) Alajuelense	1–5 home, 3–0 away
1972	none entered				
1973	Alajuelense	Semi-finals	w/o	(Suriname) Transvaal	withdrew
1973	Saprissa	Semi-finals	w/o	(Suriname) Transvaal	withdrew
1974	Cartaginés	First round	0–3	(Honduras) Motagua	0–2 home, 0–1 away
1974	Saprissa	First round	3–3 (4–5 p)	(Guatemala) Aurora	2–1 home, 1–2 away
1975	Herediano	Quarter-finals	2–3	(Costa Rica) Saprissa	2–1 home, 0–2 away
1975	Saprissa	Semi-finals	2–4	(Mexico) Atlético Español	1–2 home, 1–2 away
1976	none entered				
1977	Saprissa	Semi-finals	w/o	(Mexico) América	withdrew
1978	Cartaginés	First round	1–3	(El Salvador) FAS	1–1 home, 0–2 away
1978	Saprissa	Semi-finals	0–3	(Guatemala) Comunicaciones	0–1 home, 0–2 away
1979	Cartaginés	Quarter-finals	0–3	(El Salvador) FAS	0–1 home, 0–2 away
1980	Herediano	First round	3–4	(Honduras) Marathón	3–1 home, 0–3 away
1981	none entered				
1982	none entered				
1983	Puntarenas	First round	w/o	(El Salvador) Atlético Marte	withdrew
1983	Saprissa	First round	2–3	(Guatemala) Suchitepéquez	2–2 home, 0–1 away
1984	Sagrada Familia	Second round	w/o	(Guatemala) Comunicaciones	withdrew
1985	none entered				
1986	Alajuelense	Winners	4–2	(Suriname) Transvaal	2–1 home, 2–1 away
1986	Saprissa	First round	2–3	(Guatemala) Comunicaciones	0–3 home, 2–0 away
1987	Herediano	Group C	3rd place	(Honduras) Olimpia, (Honduras) Real España, (Costa Rica) Saprissa	
1987	Saprissa	Quarter-finals	3–4	(Mexico) América	2–2 home, 1–2 away
1988	Alajuelense	Semi-finals	1–2	(Honduras) Olimpia	1–1 home, 0–1 away
1988	Puntarenas	Group B	4th place	(Guatemala) Aurora, (El Salvador) FAS, (Honduras) Olimpia	
1989	Cartaginés	Group C	4th place	(Costa Rica) Herediano, (Honduras) Olimpia, (Honduras) Real España	
1989	Herediano	Semi-finals	2–6	(Mexico) UNAM	1–1 home, 1–5 away
1990	none entered				
1991	Alajuelense	Third round	0–3	(Honduras) Real España	0–2 home, 0–1 away
1991	Saprissa	Quarter-finals	1–4	(Honduras) Real España	1–2 home, 0–2 away
1992	Alajuelense	Final	0–1	(Mexico) América	0–1 neutral
1992	Saprissa	First round	2–4	(Mexico) América	0–0 home, 2–4 away
1993	Alajuelense	Second round	1–2	(Mexico) León	0–0 home,1–2 away
1993	Saprissa	Winners	1st place	(Mexico) León, (Guatemala) Municipal, (Suriname) Robinhood	
1994	Cartaginés	Winners	3–2	(Mexico) Atlante	3–2 neutral
1994	Herediano	Second round	4–6	(Mexico) Atlante	3–3 home,1–3 away
1995	Alajuelense	Third place	9–1	(Guadeloupe) Moulien	9–1 neutral
1995	Saprissa	Winners	1–0	(Guatemala) Municipal	1–0 home
1996	Alajuelense	Second round	2–5	(Mexico) Cruz Azul	0–2 home, 2–3 away
1996	Saprissa	Quarter-finals	3–4	(Mexico) Necaxa	2–2 home, 1–2 away
1997	Alajuelense	Second round	1–2	(Costa Rica) Cartaginés	0–0 home, 1–2 away
1997	Cartaginés	Quarter-finals	0–1	(Mexico) Guadalajara	0–1 neutral
1998	Alajuelense	Quarter-finals	0–2	(Mexico) Toluca	0–2 neutral
1998	Saprissa	Third place	2–0	(Mexico) León	2–0 neutral
1999	Alajuelense	Final	1–2	(Mexico) Necaxa	1–2 neutral
1999	Saprissa	Quarter-finals	2–3	(Mexico) Necaxa	2–3 neutral
2000	Alajuelense	Quarter-finals	1–2	(United States) D.C. United	1–2 neutral
2002	Alajuelense	Semi-finals	2–3	(Mexico) Pachuca	2–1 home, 0–2 away
2002	Saprissa	First round	1–3	(Mexico) Morelia	1–1 home, 0–2 away
2003	Alajuelense	Quarter-finals	3–5	(Mexico) América	3–1 home, 0–4 away
2004	Alajuelense	Winners	5–1	(Costa Rica) Saprissa	4–0 home, 1–1 away
2004	Saprissa	Final	1–5	(Costa Rica) Alajuelense	1–1 home, 0–4 away
2005	Saprissa	Winners	3–2	(Mexico) UNAM	2–0 home, 1–2 away
2006	Alajuelense	Semi-finals	1–2	(Mexico) América	1–2 home, 0–0 away
2006	Saprissa	Semi-finals	3–4	(Mexico) Toluca	3–2 home, 0–2 away
2007	Puntarenas	Quarter-finals	1–2	(United States) Houston Dynamo	1–0 home, 0–2 away
2008	Saprissa	Final	2–3	(Mexico) Pachuca	1–1 home, 1–2 away
2008–09	Alajuelense	Preliminary round	2–3	(Puerto Rico) Puerto Rico Islanders	1–1 home, 1–2 away
2008–09	Saprissa	Group stage	3rd	(Mexico) Cruz Azul, (United States) D.C. United, (Honduras) Marathón	
2009–10	Herediano	Preliminary round	2–6	(Mexico) Cruz Azul	2–6 home, 0–0 away
2009–10	Liberia	Preliminary round	3–6	(Honduras) Real España	3–0 home, 0–6 away
2009–10	Saprissa	Group stage	3rd	(United States) Columbus Crew, (Mexico) Cruz Azul, Puerto Rico Islanders	
2010–11	Brujas	Preliminary round	4–6	(Trinidad and Tobago) Joe Public	2–2 home, 2–4 away
2010–11	Saprissa	Semi-finals	2–3	(United States) Real Salt Lake	2–1 home, 0–2 away
2011–12	Alajuelense	Group stage	3rd	(United States) LA Galaxy, (Mexico) Morelia, (Honduras) Motagua	
2011–12	Herediano	Group stage	4th	(Guatemala) Comunicaciones, (Mexico) Monterrey, (United States) Seattle Sounders FC	
2012–13	Alajuelense	Group stage	2nd	(Nicaragua) Real Estelí, (Mexico) UANL	
2012–13	Herediano	Quarter-finals	1–4	(United States) LA Galaxy	0–0 home, 1–4 away
2013–14	Alajuelense	Semi-finals	0–3	(Mexico) Toluca	0–1 home, 0–2 away
2013–14	Cartaginés	Group stage	2nd	(United States) LA Galaxy, (El Salvador) Metapán	
2013–14	Herediano	Group stage	2nd	(Mexico) América, (Panama) Sporting San Miguelito	
2014–15	Alajuelense	Semi-finals	4–4 (a)	(Canada) Montreal Impact	4–2 home, 0–2 away
2014–15	Herediano	Semi-finals	3–6	(Mexico) América	3–0 home, 0–6 away
2014–15	Saprissa	Quarter-finals	0–5	(Mexico) América	0–3 home, 0–2 away
2015–16	Herediano	Group stage	2nd	(El Salvador) Metapán, (Mexico) UANL	
2015–16	Saprissa	Group stage	2nd	(Mexico) Santos Laguna, (Trinidad and Tobago) W Connection	
2016–17	Herediano	Group stage	2nd	(Panama) Plaza Amador, (Mexico) UANL	
2016–17	Saprissa	Quarter-finals	0–4	(Mexico) Pachuca	0–0 home, 0–4 away
2018	Herediano	Round of 16	3–5	(Mexico) UANL	2–2 home, 1–3 away
2018	Saprissa	Round of 16	2–6	(Mexico) América	1–5 home, 1–1 away
2019	Herediano	Round of 16	2–5	(United States) Atlanta United FC	3–1 home, 0–4 away
2019	Saprissa	Round of 16	3–5	(Mexico) UANL	1–0 home, 1–5 away
2020	San Carlos	Round of 16	3–6	(United States) New York City FC	3–5 home, 0–1 away
2020	Saprissa	Round of 16	2–2 (a)	(Canada) Montreal Impact	2–2 home, 0–0 away
2021	Alajuelense	Round of 16	0–2	(United States) Atlanta United FC	0–1 home, 0–1 away
2021	Saprissa	Round of 16	0–5	(United States) Philadelphia Union	0–1 home, 0–4 away
2022	Santos de Guápiles	Round of 16	0–6	(United States) New York City FC	0–2 home, 0–4 away
2022	Saprissa	Round of 16	3–6	(Mexico) UNAM	2–2 home, 1–4 away
2023	Alajuelense	Round of 16	2–4	(United States) Los Angeles FC	0–3 home, 2–1 away
2024	Alajuelense	Round of 16	1–5	(United States) New England Revolution	1–1 home, 0–4 away
2024	Herediano	Quarter-finals	1–7	(Mexico) Pachuca	0–5 home, 1–2 away
2024	Saprissa	Round one	5–6 (a.e.t.)	(United States) Philadelphia Union	2–3 home, 3–3 away
2025	Alajuelense	Round of 16	1–3	(Mexico) UNAM	1–1 home, 0–2 away
2025	Herediano	Round of 16	2–4	(United States) LA Galaxy	1–0 home, 1–4 away
2025	Saprissa	Round one	2–3	(Canada) Vancouver Whitecaps FC	2–1 home, 0–2 away

=== UNCAF Interclub Cup / CONCACAF Central American Cup ===
Interclub Cup Era (1971–1973)
Year	Team	Progress	Aggregate	Opponents	Results
1971	Herediano	Final round	3rd	(El Salvador) Alianza, (El Salvador) Atlético Marte, (Guatemala) Cementos, (Guatemala) Comunicaciones, (Costa Rica) Saprissa	
1971	Saprissa	Final round	2nd	(El Salvador) Alianza, (El Salvador) Atlético Marte, (Guatemala) Cementos, (Guatemala) Comunicaciones, (Costa Rica) Herediano	
1972	Alajuelense	Group B	3rd	(Guatemala) Aurora, (El Salvador) Alianza, (Guatemala) Municipal, (Costa Rica) Puntarenas, (El Salvador) Universidad	
1972	Herediano	Group A	2nd	(El Salvador) Atlético Marte, (Guatemala) Cementos, (Guatemala) Comunicaciones, (El Salvador) Olímpica, (Costa Rica) Saprissa	
1972	Puntarenas	Group B	6th	(Guatemala) Aurora, (Costa Rica) Alajuelense, (El Salvador) Alianza, (Guatemala) Municipal, (El Salvador) Universidad	
1972	Saprissa	Winners	2–1	(Guatemala) Aurora	1–0 home, 1–1 away
1973	Alajuelense	Final round	3rd	(El Salvador) Aguila, (Guatemala) Comunicaciones, (El Salvador) Olímpica, (Guatemala) Municipal, (Costa Rica) Saprissa	
1973	Saprissa	Winners	5–4	(El Salvador) Aguila	5–2 home, 0–2 away

Central American Cup Era (2023–)
Year	Team	Progress	Aggregate	Opponents	Results
2023	Alajuelense	Winners	4–1	(Nicaragua) Real Estelí	1–1 home, 3–0 away
2023	Cartaginés	Quarter-finals	1–6	(Costa Rica) Alajuelense	1–3 home, 0–3 away
2023	Herediano	Semi-finals	4–4 (4–5 p)	(Costa Rica) Alajuelense	2–2 home, 2–2 away
2023	Saprissa	Quarter-finals	2–3	(Nicaragua) Real Estelí	2–2 home, 0–1 away
2024	Alajuelense	Winners	3–2	(Nicaragua) Real Estelí	2–1 home, 1–1 away
2024	Guanacasteca	Group stage	5th	(Nicaragua) Managua, (Guatemala) Municipal, (Nicaragua) Real Estelí, (Costa Rica) Saprissa	
2024	Herediano	Semi-finals	2–2 (a)	(Nicaragua) Real Estelí	0–0 home, 2–2 away
2024	Saprissa	Quarter-finals	0–3	(Guatemala) Antigua GFC	0–3 home, 0–0 away
2025	Alajuelense	Winners	2–2 (4–3 p)	(Guatemala) Xelajú	1–1 home, 1–1 away
2025	Cartaginés	Quarter-finals	2–5	(Honduras) Olimpia	1–2 home, 1–3 away
2025	Herediano	Group stage	5th	(Nicaragua) Diriangén, (Guatemala) Municipal, (Honduras) Real España, (Panama) Sporting San Miguelito	
2025	Saprissa	Group stage	3rd	(Costa Rica) Cartaginés, (Panama) Independiente, (Honduras) Motagua, (Belize) Verdes	

=== CONCACAF League (defunct) ===
Year	Team	Progress	Aggregate	Opponents	Results
2017	Alajuelense	Round of 16	0–3	(Honduras) Olimpia	0–1 home, 0–2 away
2017	Santos de Guápiles	Final	1–1 (1–4 p)	(Honduras) Olimpia	1–0 home, 0–1 away
2018	Herediano	Winners	3–2	(Honduras) Motagua	2–0 home, 1–2 away
2018	Pérez Zeledón	Round of 16	2–3	(El Salvador) FAS	1–1 home, 1–2 away
2018	Santos de Guápiles	Round of 16	3–3 (6–7 p)	(Jamaica) Portmore United	1–2 home, 2–1 away
2019	Herediano	Round of 16	3–3 (6–7 p)	(Jamaica) Waterhouse	1–2 home, 2–1 away
2019	San Carlos	Quarter-finals	1–2	(El Salvador) Alianza	1–0 home, 0–2 away
2019	Saprissa	Winners	1–0	(Honduras) Motagua	1–0 home, 0–0 away
2020	Alajuelense	Winners	3–2	(Costa Rica) Saprissa	3–2 home
2020	Herediano	Round of 16	0–1	(Nicaragua) Real Estelí	0–1 home
2020	Saprissa	Final	2–3	(Costa Rica) Alajuelense	2–3 away
2021	Alajuelense	Round of 16	3–3 (a)	(Guatemala) Guastatoya	2–2 home, 1–1 away
2021	Santos de Guápiles	Quarter-finals	3–4	(Canada) Forge FC	3–1 home, 0–3 away
2021	Saprissa	Quarter-finals	5–5 (a)	(Guatemala) Comunicaciones	4–3 home, 1–2 away
2022	Alajuelense	Final	4–5	(Honduras) Olimpia	2–2 home, 2–3 away
2022	Cartaginés	Round of 16	0–4	(Honduras) Real España	0–2 home, 0–2 away
2022	Herediano	Quarter-finals	2–4	(Honduras) Real España	1–1 home, 1–3 away

=== Copa Interamericana (defunct) ===
Year	Team	Progress	Aggregate	Opponent	Results
1987	Alajuelense	Runners-up	0–3	(Argentina) River Plate	0–0 home, 0–3 away
1994	Saprissa	Runners-up	4–6 (a.e.t.)	(Chile) Universidad Católica	3–1 home, 1–5 away
1996	Cartaginés	Runners-up	0–2	(Argentina) Vélez Sársfield	0–0 home, 0–2 away
1997	Saprissa	Runners-up	2–3	(Colombia) Atlético Nacional	2–3 home, 0–0 away
