= 2019 CONCACAF League final =

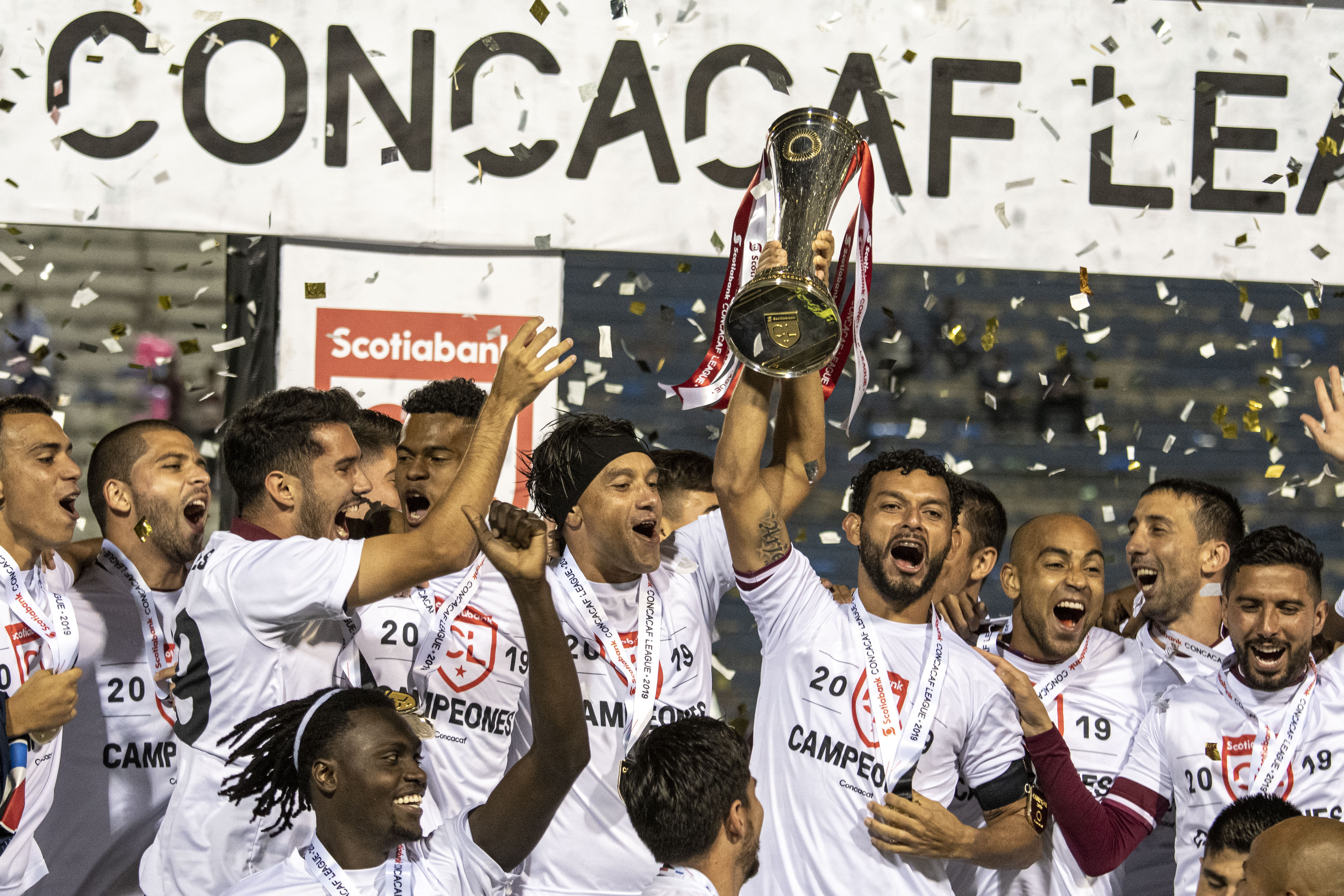
- Saprissa players celebrating with the trophy
- Event: 2019 CONCACAF League
Saprissa	Motagua
(Costa Rica)	(Honduras)
1	0
- on aggregate

First leg
Saprissa	Motagua
1	0
- Date: 7 November 2019
- Venue: Estadio Ricardo Saprissa Aymá, San José
- Referee: Daneon Parchment (Jamaica)

Second leg
Motagua	Saprissa
0	0
- Date: 26 November 2019
- Venue: Estadio Tiburcio Carías Andino, Tegucigalpa
- Referee: César Ramos (Mexico)

The 2019 CONCACAF League final was the final round of the 2019 CONCACAF League, the third edition of the CONCACAF League, the secondary club football tournament organised by CONCACAF, the regional governing body of North America, Central America, and the Caribbean.

The final was contested in two-legged home-and-away format between Saprissa from Costa Rica and Motagua from Honduras. The first leg was hosted by Saprissa at the Estadio Ricardo Saprissa Aymá in San José on 7 November 2019, while the second leg was hosted by Motagua at the Estadio Tiburcio Carías Andino in Tegucigalpa on 26 November 2019.

Saprissa won the final 1–0 on aggregate for their first CONCACAF League title.

== Teams ==
Team	Zone	Previous final appearances (bold indicates winners)
(Costa Rica) Saprissa	Central America (UNCAF)	None
(Honduras) Motagua	Central America (UNCAF)	1 (2018)

For the third consecutive season, the final of the CONCACAF League was competed between teams from Costa Rica and Honduras.

== Venues ==
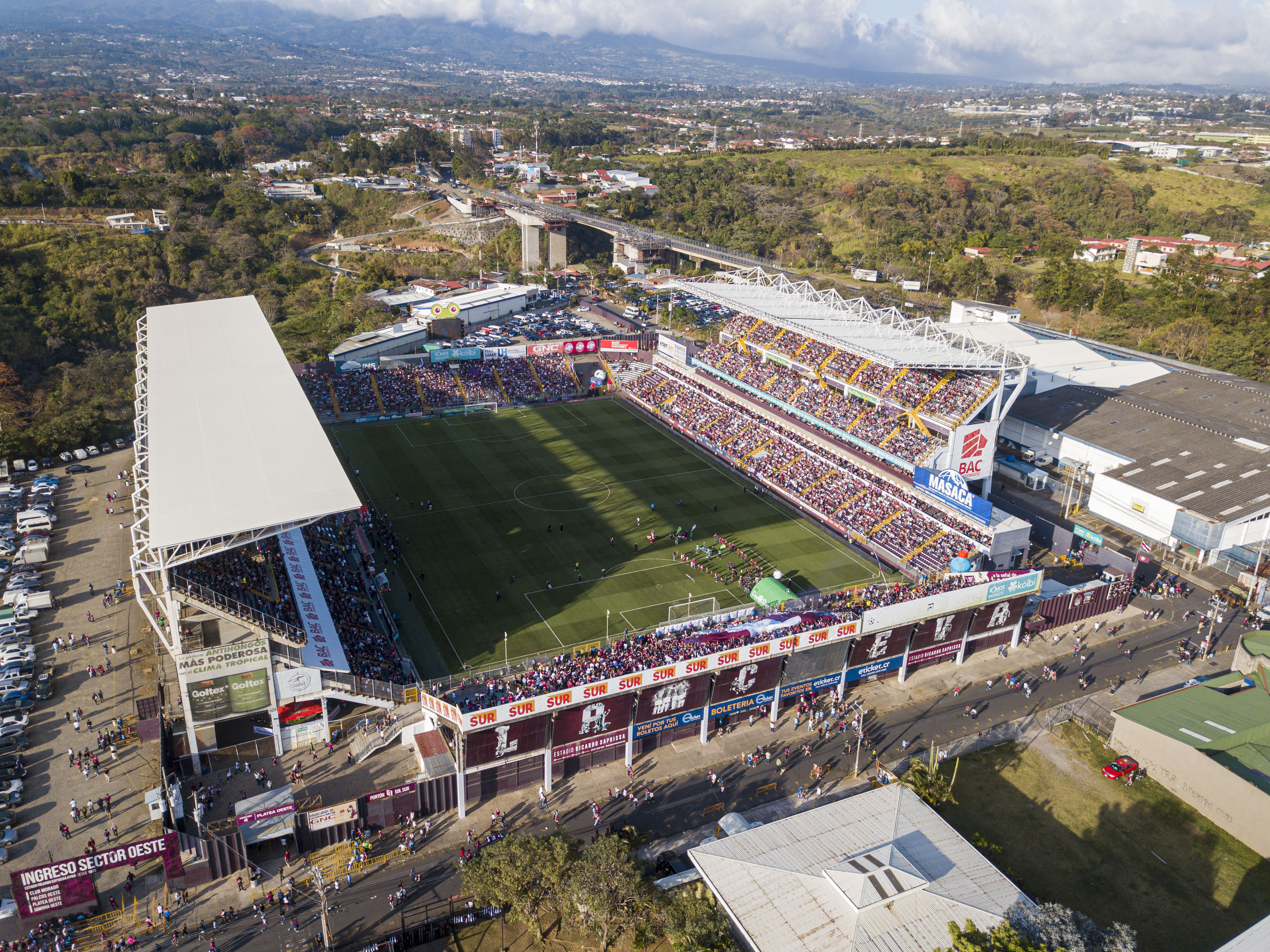
Estadio Ricardo Saprissa Aymá in San José, Costa Rica, hosted the first leg.

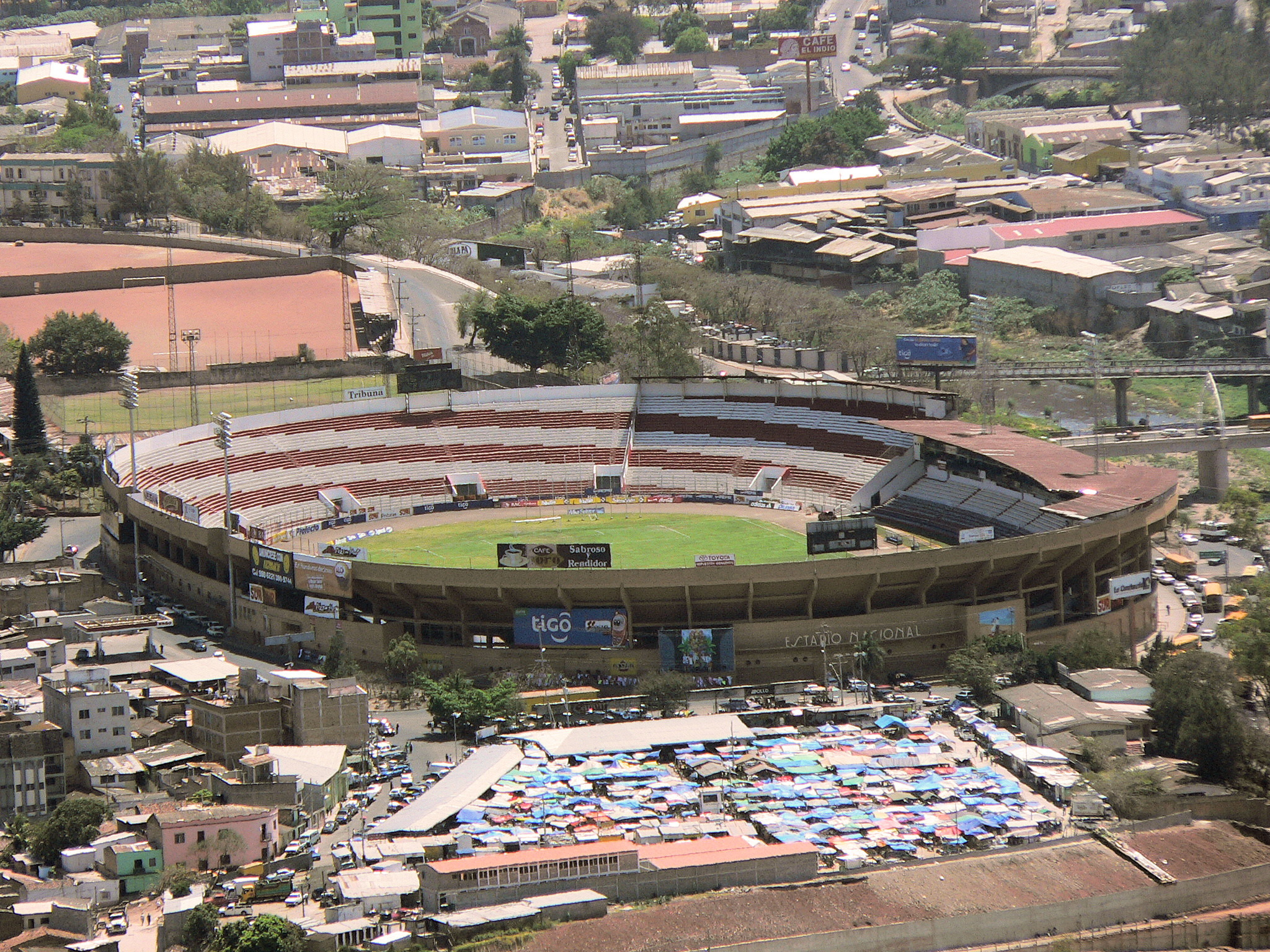
Estadio Tiburcio Carías Andino in Tegucigalpa, Honduras, hosted the second leg.

== Road to the final ==
Note: In all results below, the score of the finalist is given first (H: home; A: away).

(Costa Rica) Saprissa				Round	(Honduras) Motagua			
Opponent	Agg.	1st leg	2nd leg	2019 CONCACAF League	Opponent	Agg.	1st leg	2nd leg
(Belize) Belmopan Bandits	6–2	3–1 (A)	3–1 (H)	Preliminary round	Bye			
(El Salvador) Águila	2–1	2–0 (H)	0–1 (A)	Round of 16	(Nicaragua) Managua	3–2	2–1 (A)	1–1 (H)
(Panama) Independiente	4–2	3–2 (H)	1–0 (A)	Quarter-finals	(Jamaica) Waterhouse	2–0	2–0 (A)	0–0 (H)
(Honduras) Olimpia	4–3	0–2 (A)	4–1 (H)	Semi-finals	(El Salvador) Alianza	4–1	1–1 (A)	3–0 (H)

== Format ==
The final was played on a home-and-away two-legged basis, with the team with the better performance in previous rounds (excluding preliminary round) hosting the second leg.

The away goals rule would not be applied, and extra time would be played if the aggregate score was tied after the second leg. If the aggregate score was still tied after extra time, the penalty shoot-out would be used to determine the winner (Regulations II, Article G).

=== Performance ranking ===
Pos	Team	Pld	W	D	L	GF	GA	GD	Pts	Host
1	(Honduras) Motagua	6	3	3	0	9	3	+6	**12**	2nd leg
2	(Costa Rica) Saprissa	6	4	0	2	10	6	+4	**12**	1st leg

Source: CONCACAF
Rules for classification: 1) Points; 2) Goal difference; 3) Goals scored; 4) Away goals scored; 5) Wins; 6) Away wins; 7) Disciplinary points; 8) Drawing of lots (Regulations II, Article I).

== Matches ==
=== First leg ===
7 November 2019
20:00 UTC−6

Saprissa (Costa Rica)	1–0	(Honduras) Motagua
Venegas 19'	Report

Estadio Ricardo Saprissa Aymá, San José
Referee: Daneon Parchment (Jamaica)

**Saprissa**	**Motagua**

GK	13	(Costa Rica) Aarón Cruz
RB	12	(Costa Rica) Ricardo Blanco	(yellow card) 52'
CB	52	(Trinidad and Tobago) Aubrey David
CB	32	(Costa Rica) Alexander Robinson
LB	3	(Costa Rica) Yostin Salinas	(yellow card) 64' (yellow-red card) 75'
RM	11	(Costa Rica) Michael Barrantes (c)	(yellow card) 68'
CM	10	(Costa Rica) Marvin Angulo		(substituted off) 77'
CM	2	(Costa Rica) Christian Bolaños		(substituted off) 84'
LM	8	(Costa Rica) Randall Leal
ST	7	(Costa Rica) Johan Venegas
ST	27	(Costa Rica) Manfred Ugalde		(substituted off) 70'
Substitutes:
GK	22	(Costa Rica) Alejandro Gómez
DF	5	(Costa Rica) Jean Carlo Agüero
FW	9	(Costa Rica) David Ramírez		(substituted on) 70'
DF	14	(Costa Rica) Jaikel Medina
MF	21	(Costa Rica) Esteban Rodríguez
MF	24	(Costa Rica) Suhander Zúñiga		(substituted on) 84'
MF	33	(Costa Rica) Jaylon Hadden		(substituted on) 77'
Manager: (Costa Rica) Walter Centeno

GK	19	(Argentina) Jonathan Rougier
RB	2	(Honduras) Juan Pablo Montes (c)	(yellow card) 63'
CB	5	(Honduras) Marcelo Pereira
CB	17	(Honduras) Denil Maldonado
LB	24	(Honduras) Omar Elvir
RM	34	(Honduras) Kevin López		(substituted off) 46'
CM	3	(Honduras) Emilio Izaguirre	(yellow card) 30'
CM	16	(Honduras) Héctor Castellanos
LM	10	(Argentina) Matías Galvaliz	(yellow card) 58'	(substituted off) 71'
ST	21	(Paraguay) Roberto Moreira
ST	22	(Argentina) Marcelo Estigarribia		(substituted off) 81'
Substitutes:
GK	25	(Honduras) Marlon Licona	(yellow card) 22'
MF	4	(Honduras) Sergio Peña
MF	8	(Honduras) Walter Martínez		(substituted on) 46'
FW	11	(Honduras) Marco Tulio Vega		(substituted on) 81'
MF	12	(Honduras) Raúl Santos
DF	18	(Honduras) Wilmer Crisanto
DF	27	(Honduras) Félix Crisanto		(substituted on) 71'
Manager: (Argentina) Diego Vásquez

Assistant referees:
Ojay Duhaney (Jamaica)
Caleb Wales (Trinidad and Tobago)
Fourth official:
Reon Radix (Grenada)

**Match rules**

- 90 minutes.
- Seven named substitutes, of which up to three could be used.

=== Second leg ===
26 November 2019
21:00 UTC−6

Motagua (Honduras)	0–0	(Costa Rica) Saprissa
	Report

Estadio Tiburcio Carías Andino, Tegucigalpa
Referee: César Ramos (Mexico)

**Motagua**	**Saprissa**

GK	19	(Argentina) Jonathan Rougier
RB	2	(Honduras) Juan Pablo Montes (c)
CB	5	(Honduras) Marcelo Pereira	(substituted off) 46'
CB	17	(Honduras) Denil Maldonado
LB	24	(Honduras) Omar Elvir
RM	34	(Honduras) Kevin López
CM	3	(Honduras) Emilio Izaguirre	(substituted off) 64'
CM	16	(Honduras) Héctor Castellanos
LM	10	(Argentina) Matías Galvaliz
ST	21	(Paraguay) Roberto Moreira
ST	22	(Argentina) Marcelo Estigarribia	(substituted off) 46'
Substitutes:
GK	25	(Honduras) Marlon Licona
MF	4	(Honduras) Sergio Peña
MF	8	(Honduras) Walter Martínez	(substituted on) 64'
FW	11	(Honduras) Marco Tulio Vega	(substituted on) 46'
DF	18	(Honduras) Wilmer Crisanto
DF	27	(Honduras) Félix Crisanto	(substituted on) 46'
DF	35	(Honduras) Cristopher Meléndez
Manager: (Argentina) Diego Vásquez

GK	13	(Costa Rica) Aarón Cruz	(yellow card) 90+3'
RB	12	(Costa Rica) Ricardo Blanco	(yellow card) 83'
CB	52	(Trinidad and Tobago) Aubrey David
CB	32	(Costa Rica) Alexander Robinson
LB	31	(Costa Rica) Roy Miller
RM	11	(Costa Rica) Michael Barrantes (c)		(substituted off) 84'
CM	10	(Costa Rica) Marvin Angulo		(substituted off) 78'
CM	2	(Costa Rica) Christian Bolaños
LM	8	(Costa Rica) Randall Leal
ST	7	(Costa Rica) Johan Venegas
ST	27	(Costa Rica) Manfred Ugalde		(substituted off) 63'
Substitutes:
GK	22	(Costa Rica) Alejandro Gómez
DF	5	(Costa Rica) Jean Carlo Agüero		(substituted on) 78'
FW	9	(Costa Rica) David Ramírez		(substituted on) 63'
DF	14	(Costa Rica) Jaikel Medina
MF	19	(Costa Rica) Yael López
MF	20	(Argentina) Mariano Torres		(substituted on) 84'
MF	24	(Costa Rica) Suhander Zúñiga
Manager: (Costa Rica) Walter Centeno

Assistant referees:
Christian Espinosa (Mexico)
Michel Morales (Mexico)
Fourth official:
Luis Enrique Santander (Mexico)

**Match rules**

- 90 minutes.
- 30 minutes of extra time if tied on aggregate (no away goals rule applied).
- Penalty shoot-out if still tied after extra time.
- Seven named substitutes, of which up to three could be used, with a fourth allowed in extra time.
