= 2020 CONCACAF League final =

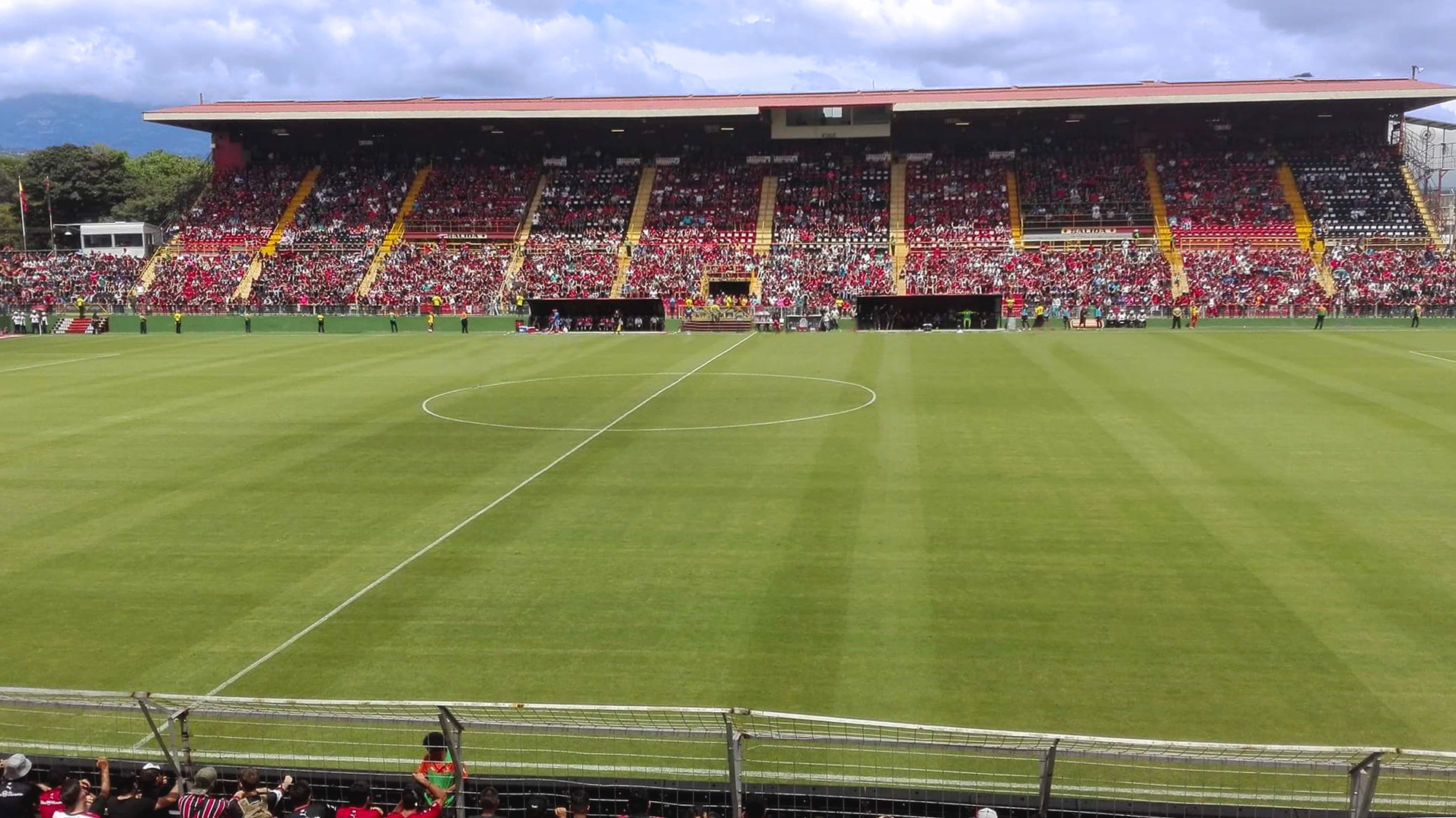
- Estadio Alejandro Morera Soto in Alajuela, Alajuela hosted the match.
- Event: 2020 CONCACAF League
Alajuelense	Saprissa
(Costa Rica)	(Costa Rica)
3	2
- Date: 3 February 2021
- Venue: Estadio Alejandro Morera Soto, Alajuela
- Referee: Iván Barton (El Salvador)

The 2020 CONCACAF League final was the final round of the 2020 CONCACAF League, the fourth edition of the CONCACAF League, the secondary club football tournament organised by CONCACAF, the regional governing body of North America, Central America, and the Caribbean.

The final was contested in a single match format between Alajuelense and Saprissa, both clubs being from Costa Rica. The final was hosted by Alajuelense at the Estadio Alejandro Morera Soto in Alajuela on 3 February 2021.

== Teams ==
Team	Zone	Previous final appearances (bold indicates winners)
(Costa Rica) Alajuelense	Central America (UNCAF)	None
(Costa Rica) Saprissa	Central America (UNCAF)	1 (**2019**)

== Road to the final ==
Note: In all results below, the score of the finalist is given first (H: home; A: away).

(Costa Rica) Alajuelense		Round	(Costa Rica) Saprissa	
Opponent	Score	2020 CONCACAF League	Opponent	Score
(Dominican Republic) Cibao	3–0 (H)	Preliminary round	Bye	
(Panama) San Francisco	1–0 (H)	Round of 16	(Guatemala) Municipal	4–1 (H)
(Nicaragua) Real Estelí	2–1 (H)	Quarter-finals	(Honduras) Marathón	2–0 (A)
(Honduras) Olimpia	0–0 (5–4 p) (H)	Semi-finals	(Haiti) Arcahaie	5–0 (H)

== Match ==
3 February 2021
22:00 (21:00 UTC−6)

Alajuelense (Costa Rica)	3–2	(Costa Rica) Saprissa
Sequeira 33'; Román 63'; López 66'	Report	Bolaños 18'; Angulo 87'

Estadio Alejandro Morera Soto, Alajuela
Attendance: 0
Referee: Iván Barton (El Salvador)

**Alajuelense**	**Saprissa**

GK	23	(Costa Rica) Leonel Moreira
RB	6	(Costa Rica) José Salvatierra
CB	3	(Costa Rica) Fernán Faerron
CB	4	(Mexico) Daniel Arreola
LB	5	(Costa Rica) Yurguin Román
RM	16	(Costa Rica) Adrián Martínez		(substituted off) 77'
CM	11	(Honduras) Alexander López		(substituted off) 83'
CM	10	(Costa Rica) Bryan Ruiz (c)
LM	22	(Costa Rica) Barlon Sequeira		(substituted off) 83'
ST	7	(Costa Rica) Jurguens Montenegro		(substituted off) 90+3'
ST	99	(Cuba) Marcel Hernández
Substitutes:
GK	18	(Costa Rica) Mauricio Vargas
DF	15	(Costa Rica) Junior Díaz
FW	8	(Costa Rica) José Miguel Cubero		(substituted on) 83'
DF	17	(Costa Rica) Carlos Mora	(yellow card) 52'	(substituted on) 77'
MF	26	(Costa Rica) Bernald Alfaro		(substituted on) 90+3'
MF	28	(Costa Rica) Brandon Aguilera
MF	14	(Costa Rica) Geancarlo Castro		(substituted on) 83'
Manager: (Argentina) Andrés Carevic

GK	13	(Costa Rica) Aarón Cruz
RB	39	(Costa Rica) Jordy Evans
CB	4	(Costa Rica) Kendall Waston	(yellow card) 37'
CB	8	(Costa Rica) David Guzmán		(substituted off) 75'
CB	5	(Argentina) Esteban Espíndola
LB	52	(Trinidad and Tobago) Aubrey David
RM	2	(Costa Rica) Christian Bolaños
CM	11	(Costa Rica) Michael Barrantes		(substituted off) 64'
CM	20	(Argentina) Mariano Torres (c)	(yellow card) 31'	(substituted off) 75'
LM	26	(Costa Rica) Daniel Colindres		(substituted off) 64'
ST	14	(Costa Rica) Ariel Rodríguez		(substituted off) 68'
Substitutes:
GK	22	(Costa Rica) Alejandro Gómez
DF	29	(Costa Rica) Luis José Hernández
FW	10	(Costa Rica) Marvin Angulo		(substituted on) 75'
DF	12	(Costa Rica) Ricardo Blanco		(substituted on) 75'
MF	21	(Costa Rica) Esteban Rodríguez		(substituted on) 64'
MF	80	(Argentina) Jimmy Marín	(yellow card) 77'	(substituted on) 64'
MF	24	(Costa Rica) Orlando Sinclair		(substituted on) 68'
Manager: (Costa Rica) Walter Centeno

== Post-match ==
Both Alajuelense and Saprissa qualified for the 2021 CONCACAF Champions League for their performance in the CONCACAF League. Alajuelense took on Atlanta United of the United States in the first round, while Saprissa played American side, Philadelphia Union.
