= José Salamanca =

José Salamanca may refer to:

- Eliseo Salamanca
- José Salamanca y Mayol, Spanish businessman, politician and noble
