= Jaikel =

Jaikel is a given and family name. Notable people with the name include:

- José Jaikel (born 1966), Costa Rican former footballer
- Jaikel Medina (born 1992), Costa Rican footballer
