= 2022 CONCACAF League final =

- Event: 2022 CONCACAF League
Olimpia	Alajuelense
(Honduras)	(Costa Rica)
5	4
- on aggregate

First leg
Olimpia	Alajuelense
3	2
- Date: 26 October 2022
- Venue: Estadio Nacional Chelato Uclés, Tegucigalpa
- Referee: Drew Fischer (Canada)
- Attendance: 19,320

Second leg
Alajuelense	Olimpia
2	2
- Date: 2 November 2022
- Venue: Estadio Alejandro Morera Soto, Alajuela
- Referee: Adonai Escobedo (Mexico)
- Attendance: 13,486

The 2022 CONCACAF League final was the final round of the 2022 CONCACAF League, the sixth and final edition of the CONCACAF League, the secondary club football tournament organised by CONCACAF, the regional governing body of North America, Central America, and the Caribbean.

The final was contested in two-legged home-and-away format between Olimpia from Honduras and Alajuelense from Costa Rica.

The first leg was hosted by Olimpia at the Estadio Nacional Chelato Uclés in Tegucigalpa on 26 October 2022, and the second leg was hosted by Alajuelense at the Estadio Alejandro Morera Soto in Alajuela on 2 November 2022.

== Teams ==
Team	Zone	Previous final appearances (bold indicates winners)
(Honduras) Olimpia	Central America (UNCAF)	1 (**2017**)
(Costa Rica) Alajuelense	Central America (UNCAF)	1 (**2020**)

== Venues ==
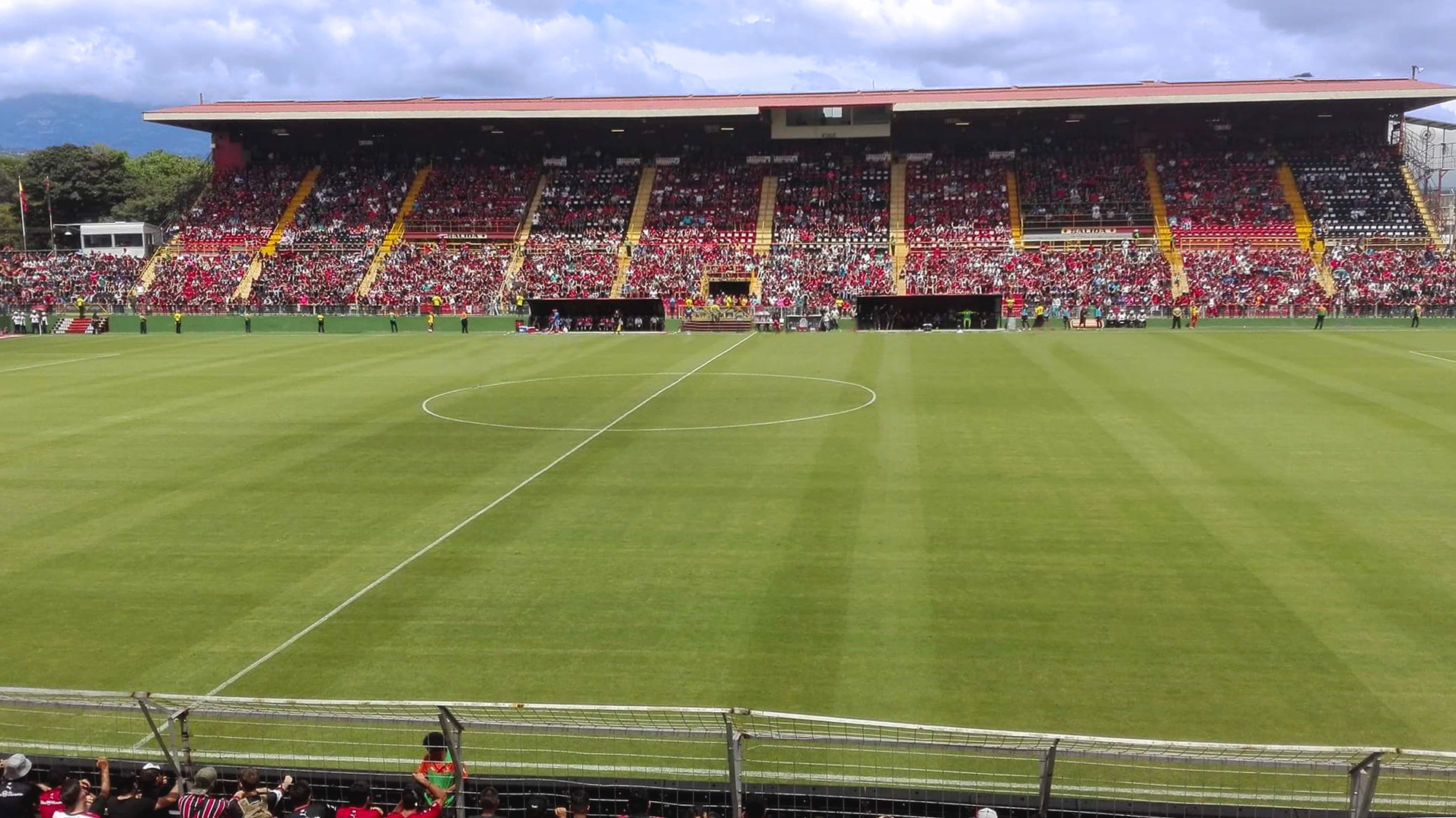
Estadio Alejandro Morera Soto in Alajuela, Costa Rica, hosted the second leg.

== Road to the final ==
Note: In all results below, the score of the finalist is given first (H: home; A: away).

(Honduras) Olimpia				Round	(Costa Rica) Alajuelense			
Opponent	Agg.	1st leg	2nd leg	2022 CONCACAF League	Opponent	Agg.	1st leg	2nd leg
Bye				Preliminary round	(El Salvador) Águila	4–1	1–1 (A)	3–0 (H)
(Guatemala) Municipal	3–2	2–2 (A)	1–0 (H)	Round of 16	(Panama) Alianza	6–1	5–0 (H)	1–1 (A)
(Nicaragua) Diriangén	7–1	0–4 (A)	3–1 (H)	Quarter-finals	(El Salvador) Alianza	3–0	0–1 (A)	2–0 (H)
(Honduras) Motagua	1–0	0–0 (A)	1–0 (H)	Semi-finals	(El Salvador) Real España	5–2	0–3 (A)	2–2 (H)

== Format ==
The final was on a home-and-away two-legged basis, with the team with the better performance in previous rounds (excluding preliminary round) hosting the second leg.

The away goals rule was not to be applied, and extra time would be played if the aggregate score was tied after the second leg. If the aggregate score was still tied after extra time, the penalty shoot-out would be used to determine the winner (Regulations II, Article G).

=== Performance ranking ===
Pos	Team	Pld	W	D	L	GF	GA	GD	Pts	Host
1	(Costa Rica) Alajuelense	6	4	2	0	14	3	+11	**14**	Second leg
2	(Honduras) Olimpia	6	4	2	0	11	3	+8	**14**	First leg

Source: CONCACAF
Rules for classification: 1) Points; 2) Goal difference; 3) Goals scored; 4) Away goals scored; 5) Wins; 6) Away wins; 7) Disciplinary points (1 point for yellow card, 3 points for indirect red card, 4 points for direct red card, 5 points for yellow card and direct red card); 8) Drawing of lots

== Matches ==
=== First leg ===
26 October 2022
21:00 (19:00 UTC−6)

Olimpia (Honduras)	3–2	(Costa Rica) Alajuelense
Pinto 12'; Álvarez 47'; Chirinos 68'	Report	Venegas 45+4'; González 84'

Estadio Nacional Chelato Uclés, Tegucigalpa
Attendance: 19,320
Referee: Drew Fischer (Canada)

**Olimpia**	**Alajuelense**

=== Second leg ===
2 November 2022
21:00 (19:00 UTC−6)

Alajuelense (Costa Rica)	2–2	(Honduras) Olimpia
Suárez 35'; Gamboa 40'	Report	Pinto 28'; Araújo 87'

Estadio Alejandro Morera Soto, Alajuela
Attendance: 13,486
Referee: Adonai Escobedo (Mexico)

**Alajuelense**	**Olimpia**
