= 2019 CONCACAF League =

2019 edition of football club competition

2019 Scotiabank CONCACAF League

Tournament details
- Dates: 30 July – 26 November
- Teams: 22 (from 11 associations)

Final positions
- Champions: (Costa Rica) Saprissa (1st title)
- Runners-up: (Honduras) Motagua

Tournament statistics
- Matches played: 42
- Goals scored: 85 (2.02 per match)
- Top scorer(s): (Costa Rica) Johan Venegas (7 goals)
- Best player: (Costa Rica) Johan Venegas
- Best young player: (Costa Rica) Manfred Ugalde
- Best goalkeeper: (Argentina) Jonathan Rougier
- Fair play award: (Costa Rica) Saprissa

The 2019 CONCACAF League (officially the 2019 Scotiabank CONCACAF League for sponsorship purposes) was the third edition of the CONCACAF League, a football club competition organized by CONCACAF, the regional governing body of North America, Central America, and the Caribbean.

The tournament was expanded from 16 to 22 teams for the 2019 edition, with the addition of a preliminary round. The six new entrants were five teams from Central America, which had previously directly qualified for the CONCACAF Champions League, and a team from Canada playing in the Canadian Premier League, bringing the total number of teams playing in the CONCACAF League/Champions League from 31 to 32. Moreover, a total of six teams now qualified from the CONCACAF League to the CONCACAF Champions League, meaning that the winners of the 2019 CONCACAF League and the next best five teams qualified for the 2020 CONCACAF Champions League.

Saprissa defeated Motagua in the final to win their first CONCACAF League. Herediano were the title holders, but were eliminated by Waterhouse in the Round of 16.

== Qualification ==
A total of 22 teams participated in the CONCACAF League:

- North American Zone: 1 team (from one association)
- Central American Zone: 18 teams (from seven associations)
- Caribbean Zone: 3 teams (from two or three associations)

Therefore, teams from either 10 or 11 out of the 41 CONCACAF member associations could participate in the CONCACAF League.

=== North America ===
The one berth for the North American Zone (NAFU) was allocated to the Canadian Soccer Association through the Canadian Premier League. As the inaugural 2019 Canadian Premier League season was not scheduled to finish by the start of the 2019 CONCACAF League, the Canadian CONCACAF League berth for this season was decided by the winners of the home and away matches in the Canadian Premier League spring season between FC Edmonton, Forge FC, and Valour FC, the three "inaugural teams" of the Canadian Premier League. They were the second Canadian representative included in CONCACAF competitions, besides the Canadian Championship champions which qualified for the CONCACAF Champions League. In future seasons, the previous year's Canadian Premier League champions would qualify for the CONCACAF League.

=== Central America ===
The 18 berths for the Central American Football Union (UNCAF), which consisted of seven member associations, were allocated as follows: three berths for each of Costa Rica, El Salvador, Guatemala, Honduras, Panama, two berths for Nicaragua, and one berth for Belize.

All of the leagues of Central America employed a split season with two tournaments in one season, so the following teams qualified for the CONCACAF League:

- In the league of Costa Rica, both champions, and the non-champions with the best aggregate record, qualified. If there was any team which were champions of both tournaments, the non-champions with the second best aggregate record qualified.
- In the leagues of El Salvador, Guatemala, Honduras, and Panama, both champions, and the runners-up with the better aggregate record (or any team which were runners-up of both tournaments), qualified. If there was any team which were finalists of both tournaments, the runners-up with the worse aggregate record qualified. If there were any two teams which were finalists of both tournaments, the semi-finalists with the best aggregate record qualified.
- In the league of Nicaragua, both champions qualified. If there was any team which were champions of both tournaments, the runners-up with the better aggregate record (or any team which were runners-up of both tournaments) qualified.
- In the league of Belize, the champions with the better aggregate record (or any team which were champions of both tournaments) qualified.

If teams from any Central American associations were excluded, they were replaced by teams from other Central American associations, with the associations chosen based on results from previous CONCACAF League and CONCACAF Champions League tournaments.

=== Caribbean ===
The three berths for the Caribbean Football Union (CFU), which consisted of 31 member associations, were allocated via the CONCACAF Caribbean Club Championship and CONCACAF Caribbean Club Shield, the first-tier and second-tier subcontinental Caribbean club tournaments. Since 2018, the CONCACAF Caribbean Club Championship was open to teams from professional leagues, where they could qualify as champions or runners-up of their respective association's league in the previous season, while the CONCACAF Caribbean Club Shield was open to teams from non-professional leagues, where they could qualify as champions of their respective association's league in the previous season.

Besides the champions of the CONCACAF Caribbean Club Championship which qualified for the CONCACAF Champions League, the runners-up and third-placed team of the CONCACAF Caribbean Club Championship, and the winners of a playoff between the fourth-placed team of the CONCACAF Caribbean Club Championship and the champions of the CONCACAF Caribbean Club Shield, qualified for the CONCACAF League. For the champions of the CONCACAF Caribbean Club Shield to be eligible for the playoff, they had to comply with the minimum CONCACAF Club Licensing requirements for the CONCACAF League.

== Teams ==
The following 22 teams (from eleven associations) qualify for the tournament.

- Ten teams enter in the round of 16: two each from Costa Rica, Honduras, and Panama, and one each from El Salvador, Guatemala, Nicaragua, and the Caribbean.
- Twelve teams enter in the preliminary round: two each from El Salvador, Guatemala, and the Caribbean, and one each from Canada, Costa Rica, Honduras, Panama, Nicaragua, and Belize.

Qualified teams from North America (1 team: entering in preliminary round)
Association	Team	Entry round	Qualifying method	App. (last)	Previous best (last)
Canada (1 PR berth)	Forge FC	Preliminary round	2019 Canadian CONCACAF League series winners	1st	Debut

Qualified teams from Central America (18 teams: 9 entering in round of 16, 9 entering in preliminary round)
Association	Team	Entry round	Qualifying method	App. (last)	Previous best (last)
Costa Rica (3 berths: 2 R16 + 1 PR)	San Carlos	Round of 16	Champions with better 2018–19 aggregate record (2019 Clausura)	1st	Debut
Costa Rica (3 berths: 2 R16 + 1 PR)	Herediano	Round of 16	Champions with worse 2018–19 aggregate record (2018 Apertura)	2nd (2018)	Champions (2018)
Costa Rica (3 berths: 2 R16 + 1 PR)	Saprissa	Preliminary round	Non-champions with best 2018–19 aggregate record	1st	Debut
Honduras (3 berths: 2 R16 + 1 PR)	Motagua	Round of 16	2018 Apertura and 2019 Clausura champions	2nd (2018)	Runners-up (2018)
Honduras (3 berths: 2 R16 + 1 PR)	Olimpia	Round of 16	2018 Apertura and 2019 Clausura runners-up	2nd (2017)	Champions (2017)
Honduras (3 berths: 2 R16 + 1 PR)	Marathón	Preliminary round	Semi-finalists with best 2018–19 aggregate record (2019 Clausura)	1st	Debut
Panama (3 berths: 2 R16 + 1 PR)	Tauro	Round of 16	Champions with better 2018–19 aggregate record (2018 Apertura)	2nd (2018)	Semi-finals (2018)
Panama (3 berths: 2 R16 + 1 PR)	Independiente	Round of 16	Champions with worse 2018–19 aggregate record (2019 Clausura)	1st	Debut
Panama (3 berths: 2 R16 + 1 PR)	San Francisco	Preliminary round	Runners-up with better 2018–19 aggregate record (2019 Clausura)	1st	Debut
El Salvador (3 berths: 1 R16 + 2 PR)	Águila	Round of 16	Champions with better 2018–19 aggregate record (2019 Clausura)	2nd (2017)	Quarter-finals (2017)
El Salvador (3 berths: 1 R16 + 2 PR)	Santa Tecla	Preliminary round	Champions with worse 2018–19 aggregate record (2018 Apertura)	2nd (2018)	Round of 16 (2018)
El Salvador (3 berths: 1 R16 + 2 PR)	Alianza	Preliminary round	2018 Apertura and 2019 Clausura runners-up	2nd (2017)	Quarter-finals (2017)
Guatemala (3 berths: 1 R16 + 2 PR)	Guastatoya	Round of 16	Champions with better 2018–19 aggregate record (2018 Apertura)	1st	Debut
Guatemala (3 berths: 1 R16 + 2 PR)	Antigua GFC	Preliminary round	Champions with worse 2018–19 aggregate record (2019 Clausura)	1st	Debut
Guatemala (3 berths: 1 R16 + 2 PR)	Comunicaciones	Preliminary round	Runners-up with better 2018–19 aggregate record (2018 Apertura)	1st	Debut
Nicaragua (2 berths: 1 R16 + 1 PR)	Managua	Round of 16	Champions with better 2018–19 aggregate record (2018 Apertura)	1st	Debut
Nicaragua (2 berths: 1 R16 + 1 PR)	Real Estelí	Preliminary round	Champions with worse 2018–19 aggregate record (2019 Clausura)	2nd (2017)	Round of 16 (2017)
Belize (1 PR berth)	Belmopan Bandits	Preliminary round	Champions with better 2018–19 aggregate record (2018 Opening)	3rd (2018)	Round of 16 (2018)

Qualified teams from Caribbean (3 teams: 1 entering in round of 16, 2 entering in preliminary round)
Association	Team	Entry round	Qualifying method	App. (last)	Previous best (last)
Jamaica	Waterhouse	Round of 16	2019 CONCACAF Caribbean Club Championship runners-up	1st	Debut
Haiti	Capoise	Preliminary round	2019 CONCACAF Caribbean Club Championship third place	1st	Debut
Suriname	Robinhood	Preliminary round	2019 Caribbean CONCACAF League playoff winners	1st	Debut

Notes

1. Canada (CAN): As the inaugural 2019 Canadian Premier League season was not scheduled to finish by the start of the 2019 CONCACAF League, the Canadian CONCACAF League berth for this season was decided by the winners of the home and away matches in the Canadian Premier League spring season between FC Edmonton, Forge FC, and Valour FC, the three "inaugural teams" of the Canadian Premier League.

== Draw ==
Location of teams of the 2019 CONCACAF League
North American Zone
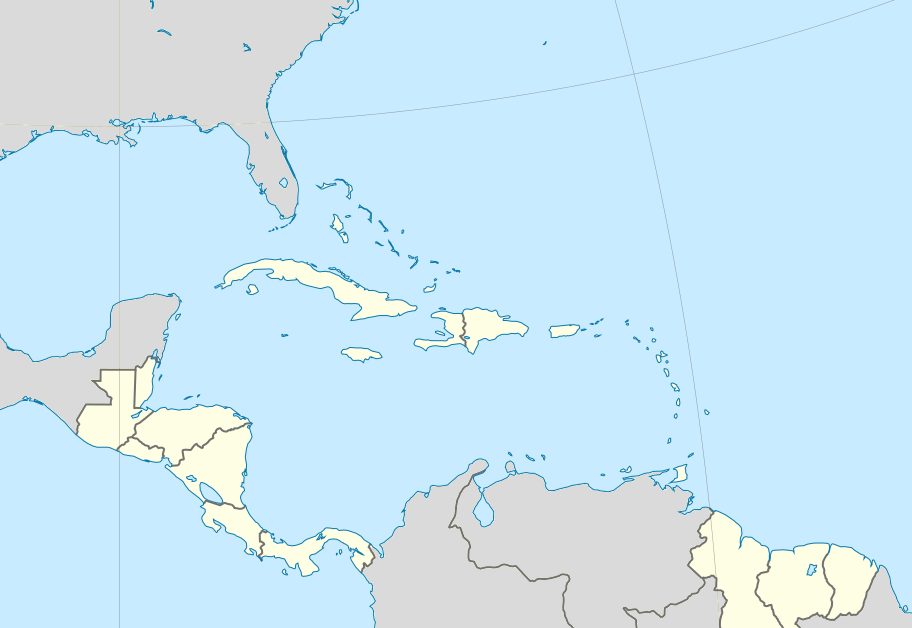
Location of teams of the 2019 CONCACAF League
Central American Zone Caribbean Zone
Teams in bold enter in the round of 16

The draw for the 2019 CONCACAF League was held on 30 May 2019, at 20:00 Eastern Time (18:00 local time), at the Grand Tikal Futura Hotel in Guatemala City, Guatemala.

The draw determined each tie in the preliminary round (numbered 1 through 6) between a team from Pot 1 and a team from Pot 2, each containing six teams. The "Bracket Position Pots" (Pot A and Pot B) contained the bracket positions numbered 1 through 6 corresponding to each tie. The teams from Pot 1 were assigned a bracket position from Pot A and the teams from Pot 2 were assigned a bracket position from Pot B. Teams from the same association could not be drawn against each other in the preliminary round except for "wildcard" teams which replaced a team from another association.

The draw also determined each tie in the round of 16 (numbered 1 through 8) between a team from Pot 3 and a team from Pot 4, each containing eight teams, with the six preliminary round winners, whose identity was not known at the time of the draw, in Pot 4. The "Bracket Position Pots" (Pot A and Pot B) contained the bracket positions numbered 1 through 8 corresponding to each tie. The teams from Pot 3 were assigned a bracket position from Pot A and the teams from Pot 4 were assigned a bracket position from Pot B.

The seeding of teams was based on the CONCACAF Club Index. The CONCACAF Club Index, instead of ranking each team, was based on the on-field performance of the teams that had occupied the respective qualifying slots in the previous five editions of the CONCACAF League and CONCACAF Champions League. To determine the total points awarded to a slot in any single edition of the CONCACAF League or CONCACAF Champions League, CONCACAF used the following formula:

Points per	Participation	Win	Draw	Stage advanced	Champions
CONCACAF Champions League (2014–15 – 2019)	4	3	1	1	2
CONCACAF League (2017 – 2018)	2	3	1	0.5	1

Teams qualified for the CONCACAF League based on criteria set by their association (e.g., tournament champions, runners-up, cup champions), resulting in an assigned slot (e.g., CRC1, CRC2) for each team.

The 22 teams were distributed in the pots as follows:

Teams in preliminary round draw
Pot	Rank	Slot	2014–15 CCL	2015–16 CCL	2016–17 CCL	2017 CL or 2018 CCL	2018 CL or 2019 CCL	Total	Team
Pot 1	1	SLV2	5	6	5	11.5	5	32.5	(El Salvador) Santa Tecla
Pot 1	2	PAN3	0	0	0	11	15	26	(Panama) San Francisco
Pot 1	3	HON3	0	0	0	2	21.5	23.5	(Honduras) Marathón
Pot 1	4	CCC3	4	5	4	5	5.5	23.5	(Haiti) Capoise
Pot 1	5	GUA2	8	8	6	0	0	22	(Guatemala) Antigua GFC
Pot 1	6	CRC3	0	0	0	2	19.5	21.5	(Costa Rica) Saprissa
Pot 2	7	BLZ1	0	8	4	2	2	16	(Belize) Belmopan Bandits
Pot 2	8	SLV3	0	0	0	8.5	6.5	15	(El Salvador) Alianza
Pot 2	9	NCA2	0	0	0	9.5	2	11.5	(Nicaragua) Real Estelí
Pot 2	10	CCC4	0	0	0	2	5	7	(Suriname) Robinhood
Pot 2	11	GUA3	0	0	0	0	0	0	(Guatemala) Comunicaciones
Pot 2	12	CAN2	0	0	0	0	0	0	(Canada) Forge FC

Teams in round of 16 draw
Pot	Rank	Slot	2014–15 CCL	2015–16 CCL	2016–17 CCL	2017 CL or 2018 CCL	2018 CL or 2019 CCL	Total	Team
Pot 3	1	PAN1	4	10	20	8	12	54	(Panama) Tauro
Pot 3	2	CRC2	18	9	14	5	3	49	(Costa Rica) Herediano
Pot 3	3	PAN2	8	10	8	13	8.5	47.5	(Panama) Independiente
Pot 3	4	HON1	15	10	11	5	4	45	(Honduras) Motagua
Pot 3	5	CRC1	12	10	8	5	7	42	(Costa Rica) San Carlos
Pot 3	6	HON2	8	11	11	2	3	35	(Honduras) Olimpia
Pot 3	7	SLV1	4	7	9	7	5	32	(El Salvador) Águila
Pot 3	8	GUA1	11	8	9	0	4	32	(Guatemala) Guastatoya
Pot 4	9	CCC2	10	7	5	2	5	29	(Jamaica) Waterhouse
Pot 4	10	NCA1	6	4	6	5	5.5	26.5	(Nicaragua) Managua
Pot 4	11	Winner preliminary round 1							
Pot 4	12	Winner preliminary round 2							
Pot 4	13	Winner preliminary round 3							
Pot 4	14	Winner preliminary round 4							
Pot 4	15	Winner preliminary round 5							
Pot 4	16	Winner preliminary round 6							

Notes

1. ^{CAN} The identity of the team qualifying for the slot for Canada (CAN2) was not known at the time of the draw.
2. ^{HON} The identity of the teams qualifying for two of the three slots for Honduras (HON1 and HON2) was not known at the time of the draw. However, as both Motagua and Olimpia were certain to be in Pot 3 for the round of 16 draw, they were included and assigned a bracket position from Pot A by the round of 16 draw.
3. ^{PAN} The identity of the teams qualifying for the three slots for Panama (PAN1, PAN2 and PAN3) was not known at the time of the draw.

== Format ==
In the CONCACAF League, the 22 teams played a single-elimination tournament. Each tie was played on a home-and-away two-legged basis.

- In the preliminary round, round of 16, quarter-finals, and semi-finals, the away goals rule was applied if the aggregate score was tied after the second leg. If still tied, a penalty shoot-out was used to determine the winner (Regulations II, Article G).
- In the final, the away goals rule was not applied, and extra time was played if the aggregate score was tied after the second leg. If the aggregate score was still tied after extra time, the penalty shoot-out was used to determine the winner (Regulations II, Article H).

== Schedule ==
The schedule of the competition was as follows.

Round	First leg	Second leg
Preliminary round	30 July – 1 August 2019	6–8 August 2019
Round of 16	20–22 August 2019	27–29 August 2019
Quarter-finals	24–26 September 2019	1–3 October 2019
Semi-finals	24 October 2019	31 October 2019
Final	7 November 2019	26 November 2019

Times are Eastern Time, as listed by CONCACAF (local times are in parentheses):

- Times up to 2 November 2019 (preliminary round, round of 16, quarter-finals, and semi-finals) are Eastern Daylight Time, i.e., UTC−4.
- Times thereafter (final) are Eastern Standard Time, i.e., UTC−5.

== Bracket ==
Preliminary round
(Canada) Forge FC	2	0	2
(Guatemala) Antigua GFC	1	0	1
(Guatemala) Comunicaciones	2	1	3
(Honduras) Marathón	1	1	2
(Belize) Belmopan Bandits	1	1	2
(Costa Rica) Saprissa	3	3	6
(Suriname) Robinhood (a)	0	1	1
(Haiti) Capoise	0	1	1
(El Salvador) Alianza	5	1	6
(Panama) San Francisco	1	0	1
(Nicaragua) Real Estelí	2	0	2
(El Salvador) Santa Tecla (a)	1	1	2

Round of 16
(Canada) Forge FC	1	1	2
(Honduras) Olimpia	0	4	4
(Guatemala) Comunicaciones	2	0	2
(Guatemala) Guastatoya	1	0	1
(Costa Rica) Saprissa	2	0	2
(El Salvador) Águila	0	1	1
(Suriname) Robinhood	1	1	2
(Panama) Independiente	1	2	3
(El Salvador) Alianza	2	0	2
(Panama) Tauro	0	1	1
(El Salvador) Santa Tecla	0	0	0 (2)
(Costa Rica) San Carlos (p)	0	0	0 (4)
(Jamaica) Waterhouse (p)	1	1	2 (7)
(Costa Rica) Herediano	1	1	2 (6)
(Nicaragua) Managua	1	1	2
(Honduras) Motagua	2	1	3

Quarter-finals
(Honduras) Olimpia	2	0	2
(Guatemala) Comunicaciones	0	0	0
(Costa Rica) Saprissa	3	1	4
(Panama) Independiente	2	0	2
(El Salvador) Alianza	2	0	2
(Costa Rica) San Carlos	0	1	1
(Jamaica) Waterhouse	0	0	0
(Honduras) Motagua	2	0	2

Semi-finals
(Honduras) Olimpia	2	1	3
(Costa Rica) Saprissa	0	4	4
(El Salvador) Alianza	1	0	1
(Honduras) Motagua	1	3	4

Final
(Costa Rica) Saprissa	1	0	1
(Honduras) Motagua	0	0	0

== Preliminary round ==
In the preliminary round, the matchups were decided by draw: PR-1 through PR-6. The teams from Pot 1 in the draw hosted the second leg.

=== Summary ===
The first legs were played on 30 July – 1 August, and the second legs were played on 6–8 August 2019.

Team 1	Agg.	Team 2	1st leg	2nd leg
Alianza (El Salvador)	6–1	(Panama) San Francisco	5–1	1–0
Robinhood (Suriname)	1–1 (a)	(Haiti) Capoise	0–0	1–1
Belmopan Bandits (Belize)	2–6	(Costa Rica) Saprissa	1–3	1–3
Forge FC (Canada)	2–1	(Guatemala) Antigua GFC	2–1	0–0
Comunicaciones (Guatemala)	3–2	(Honduras) Marathón	2–1	1–1
Real Estelí (Nicaragua)	2–2 (a)	(El Salvador) Santa Tecla	2–1	0–1

=== Matches ===
1 August 2019
20:00 (18:00 UTC−6)

Alianza (El Salvador)	5–1	(Panama) San Francisco
Jiménez 15'; Peñaranda 25'; Cabrera 35' (o.g.); Monterrosa 75'; Soto 81'	Report	Cabrera 42'

Estadio Cuscatlán, San Salvador
Referee: Bryan López (Guatemala)
8 August 2019
20:00 (19:00 UTC−5)

San Francisco (Panama)	0–1	(El Salvador) Alianza
	Report	Cerén 77'

Estadio Agustín Sánchez, La Chorrera
Referee: Diego Montaño (Mexico)

Alianza won 6–1 on aggregate.

31 July 2019
20:00 (21:00 UTC−3)

Robinhood (Suriname)	0–0	(Haiti) Capoise
	Report

André Kamperveen Stadion, Paramaribo
Referee: Okeito Nicholson (Jamaica)
7 August 2019
20:00 (20:00 UTC−4)

Capoise (Haiti)	1–1	(Suriname) Robinhood
Kohinor 22' (o.g.)	Report	Da Costa 79'

Stade Sylvio Cator, Port-au-Prince
Referee: Reon Radix (Grenada)

1–1 on aggregate. Robinhood won on away goals.

31 July 2019
22:00 (20:00 UTC−6)

Belmopan Bandits (Belize)	1–3	(Costa Rica) Saprissa
James 34'	Report	Ugalde 13', 44'; Venegas 42' (pen.)

Isidoro Beaton Stadium, Belmopan
Referee: Nitzar Sandoval (Nicaragua)
7 August 2019
22:00 (20:00 UTC−6)

Saprissa (Costa Rica)	3–1	(Belize) Belmopan Bandits
Martínez 54'; Bolaños 83'; Ugalde 90+3' (pen.)	Report	Hernández 38'

Estadio Ricardo Saprissa Aymá, San José
Referee: José Torres (Puerto Rico)

Saprissa won 6–2 on aggregate.

1 August 2019
18:00 (18:00 UTC−4)

Forge FC (Canada)	2–1	(Guatemala) Antigua GFC
Krutzen 46'; Choinière 90+1'	Report	Pacheco 33'

Tim Hortons Field, Hamilton
Attendance: 4,644
Referee: Juan Gabriel Calderón (Costa Rica)
8 August 2019
20:00 (18:00 UTC−6)

Antigua GFC (Guatemala)	0–0	(Canada) Forge FC
	Report

Estadio Doroteo Guamuch Flores, Guatemala City
Referee: Randy Encarnación (Dominican Republic)

Forge FC won 2–1 on aggregate.

1 August 2019
22:00 (20:00 UTC−6)

Comunicaciones (Guatemala)	2–1	(Honduras) Marathón
Gordillo 47'; Vargas 54'	Report	Solano 5'

Estadio Doroteo Guamuch Flores, Guatemala City
Referee: Oshane Nation (Jamaica)
8 August 2019
22:00 (20:00 UTC−6)

Marathón (Honduras)	1–1	(Guatemala) Comunicaciones
Arboleda 80'	Report	Hernández 89'

Estadio Olímpico Metropolitano, San Pedro Sula
Referee: Ismael Cornejo (El Salvador)

Comunicaciones won 3–2 on aggregate.

30 July 2019
22:00 (20:00 UTC−6)

Real Estelí (Nicaragua)	2–1	(El Salvador) Santa Tecla
Barroca 8'; Barrera 59'	Report	Flores 34'

Nicaragua National Football Stadium, Managua
Referee: Rubiel Vazquez (United States)
6 August 2019
22:00 (20:00 UTC−6)

Santa Tecla (El Salvador)	1–0	(Nicaragua) Real Estelí
Polo 9'	Report

Estadio Las Delicias, Santa Tecla
Referee: Tristley Bassue (Saint Kitts and Nevis)

2–2 on aggregate. Santa Tecla won on away goals.

== Round of 16 ==
In the round of 16, the matchups were decided by draw: R16-1 through R16-8. The teams from Pot 3 in the draw hosted the second leg.

=== Summary ===
The first legs were played on 20–22 August, and the second legs were played on 27–29 August 2019.

Team 1	Agg.	Team 2	1st leg	2nd leg
Managua (Nicaragua)	2–3	(Honduras) Motagua	1–2	1–1
Waterhouse (Jamaica)	2–2 (7–6 p)	(Costa Rica) Herediano	1–1	1–1
Santa Tecla (El Salvador)	0–0 (2–4 p)	(Costa Rica) San Carlos	0–0	0–0
Alianza (El Salvador)	2–1	(Panama) Tauro	2–0	0–1
Robinhood (Suriname)	2–3	(Panama) Independiente	1–1	1–2
Saprissa (Costa Rica)	2–1	(El Salvador) Águila	2–0	0–1
Comunicaciones (Guatemala)	2–1	(Guatemala) Guastatoya	2–1	0–0
Forge FC (Canada)	2–4	(Honduras) Olimpia	1–0	1–4

=== Matches ===
20 August 2019
22:00 (20:00 UTC−6)

Managua (Nicaragua)	1–2	(Honduras) Motagua
Gállego 51'	Report	Fuentes 19' (o.g.); Maldonado 59'

Nicaragua National Football Stadium, Managua
Referee: John Pitti (Panama)
27 August 2019
22:00 (20:00 UTC−6)

Motagua (Honduras)	1–1	(Nicaragua) Managua
Moreira 37' (pen.)	Report	Peralta 16'

Estadio Olímpico Metropolitano, San Pedro Sula (Note: The round of 16 home matches of Honduran clubs Olimpia and Motagua were moved from Estadio Tiburcio Carías Andino, Tegucigalpa to Estadio Olímpico Metropolitano, San Pedro Sula, and required by CONCACAF to be played behind closed doors, after incidents before the domestic league match between the two teams on 17 August 2019 at the Estadio Tiburcio Carías Andino.)
Attendance: 0
Referee: Ismael Cornejo (El Salvador)

Motagua won 3–2 on aggregate.

22 August 2019
18:00 (17:00 UTC−5)

Waterhouse (Jamaica)	1–1	(Costa Rica) Herediano
Fletcher 3'	Report	Brown 17'

National Stadium, Kingston
Referee: José Kellys (Panama)
29 August 2019
22:00 (20:00 UTC−6)

Herediano (Costa Rica)	1–1	(Jamaica) Waterhouse
Tejeda 2'	Report	Murray 28'
Penalties
Magaña (penalty scored); González (penalty scored); Tejeda (penalty missed); Torres (penalty scored); Rodríguez (penalty scored); Álvarez (penalty scored); Soto (penalty missed); Brown (penalty scored); Alvarado (penalty missed)	6–7	(penalty missed) Stewart; (penalty scored) Simpson; (penalty scored) Finlayson; (penalty scored) Binns; (penalty scored) Williams; (penalty scored) Miller; (penalty missed) Murray; (penalty scored) Lawes; (penalty scored) Chambers

Estadio Eladio Rosabal Cordero, Heredia
Referee: Oliver Vergara (Panama)

2–2 on aggregate. Waterhouse won 7–6 on penalties.

20 August 2019
20:00 (18:00 UTC−6)

Santa Tecla (El Salvador)	0–0	(Costa Rica) San Carlos
	Report

Estadio Las Delicias, Santa Tecla
Referee: Oliver Vergara (Panama)
27 August 2019
22:00 (20:00 UTC−6)

San Carlos (Costa Rica)	0–0	(El Salvador) Santa Tecla
	Report
Penalties
Saborío (penalty scored); Ramírez (penalty scored); Rodríguez (penalty missed); Pérez (penalty scored); Arrieta (penalty scored)	4–2	(penalty scored) Cienfuegos; (penalty scored) Wi. Torres; (penalty missed) Domínguez; (penalty missed) E. Rivera

Estadio Alejandro Morera Soto, Alajuela
Referee: Jorge Pérez (Mexico)

0–0 on aggregate. San Carlos won 4–2 on penalties.

22 August 2019
22:00 (20:00 UTC−6)

Alianza (El Salvador)	2–0	(Panama) Tauro
Peñaranda 38'; Mancía 57'	Report

Estadio Cuscatlán, San Salvador
Referee: Walter López (Guatemala)
29 August 2019
20:00 (19:00 UTC−5)

Tauro (Panama)	1–0	(El Salvador) Alianza
Góndola 4'	Report

Estadio Rommel Fernández, Panama City
Referee: Jair Marrufo (United States)

Alianza won 2–1 on aggregate.

20 August 2019
20:00 (21:00 UTC−3)

Robinhood (Suriname)	1–1	(Panama) Independiente
Cairo 90+3'	Report	Fajardo 78' (pen.)

André Kamperveen Stadion, Paramaribo
Referee: Ricangel de Leça (Aruba)
27 August 2019
20:00 (19:00 UTC−5)

Independiente (Panama)	2–1	(Suriname) Robinhood
Ayarza 8'; Fajardo 35'	Report	Rosebel 78'

Estadio Agustín Sánchez, La Chorrera
Referee: Tristley Bassue (Saint Kitts and Nevis)

Independiente won 3–2 on aggregate.

21 August 2019
22:00 (20:00 UTC−6)

Saprissa (Costa Rica)	2–0	(El Salvador) Águila
Venegas 38' (pen.); Barrantes 45+2'	Report

Estadio Ricardo Saprissa Aymá, San José
Referee: David Gantar (Canada)
28 August 2019
22:00 (20:00 UTC−6)

Águila (El Salvador)	1–0	(Costa Rica) Saprissa
Castillo 78'	Report

Estadio Cuscatlán, San Salvador
Referee: Adonai Escobedo (Mexico)

Saprissa won 2–1 on aggregate.

21 August 2019
20:00 (18:00 UTC−6)

Comunicaciones (Guatemala)	2–1	(Guatemala) Guastatoya
Herrera 53' (pen.); Gordillo 79'	Report	Herrarte 17'

Estadio Doroteo Guamuch Flores, Guatemala City
Referee: Benjamín Pineda (Costa Rica)
28 August 2019
20:00 (18:00 UTC−6)

Guastatoya (Guatemala)	0–0	(Guatemala) Comunicaciones
	Report

Estadio Doroteo Guamuch Flores, Guatemala City
Referee: Oshane Nation (Jamaica)

Comunicaciones won 2–1 on aggregate.

22 August 2019
20:00 (20:00 UTC−4)

Forge FC (Canada)	1–0	(Honduras) Olimpia
Nanco 4'	Report

Tim Hortons Field, Hamilton
Referee: José Torres (Puerto Rico)
29 August 2019
22:00 (20:00 UTC−6)

Olimpia (Honduras)	4–1	(Canada) Forge FC
Ferrari 30'; Flores 42'; Lacayo 75'; Bengtson 79'	Report	Choinière 88'

Estadio Olímpico Metropolitano, San Pedro Sula
Attendance: 0
Referee: Henry Bejarano (Costa Rica)

Olimpia won 4–2 on aggregate.

== Quarter-finals ==
In the quarter-finals, the matchups were determined as follows:

- QF1: Winner R16-1 vs. Winner R16-2
- QF2: Winner R16-3 vs. Winner R16-4
- QF3: Winner R16-5 vs. Winner R16-6
- QF4: Winner R16-7 vs. Winner R16-8

The winners of round of 16 matchups 1, 3, 5, 7 hosted the second leg.

=== Summary ===
The first legs were played on 24–26 September, and the second legs were played on 1–3 October 2019.

Team 1	Agg.	Team 2	1st leg	2nd leg
Waterhouse (Jamaica)	0–2	(Honduras) Motagua	0–2	0–0
Alianza (El Salvador)	2–1	(Costa Rica) San Carlos	2–0	0–1
Saprissa (Costa Rica)	4–2	(Panama) Independiente	3–2	1–0
Olimpia (Honduras)	2–0	(Guatemala) Comunicaciones	2–0	0–0

=== Matches ===
25 September 2019
22:00 (21:00 UTC−5)

Waterhouse (Jamaica)	0–2	(Honduras) Motagua
	Report	Pereira 66'; López 71'

National Stadium, Kingston
Referee: Reon Radix (Grenada)
2 October 2019
22:00 (20:00 UTC−6)

Motagua (Honduras)	0–0	(Jamaica) Waterhouse
	Report

Estadio Olímpico Metropolitano, San Pedro Sula
Referee: Walter López (Guatemala)

Motagua won 2–0 on aggregate.

26 September 2019
20:00 (18:00 UTC−6)

Alianza (El Salvador)	2–0	(Costa Rica) San Carlos
Peñaranda 16'; Monterrosa 68'	Report

Estadio Cuscatlán, San Salvador
Referee: John Pitti (Panama)
3 October 2019
20:00 (18:00 UTC−6)

San Carlos (Costa Rica)	1–0	(El Salvador) Alianza
Brenes 87'	Report

Estadio Alejandro Morera Soto, Alajuela
Referee: Mario Escobar (Guatemala)

Alianza won 2–1 on aggregate.

24 September 2019
22:00 (20:00 UTC−6)

Saprissa (Costa Rica)	3–2	(Panama) Independiente
Venegas 17', 45+1', 90+2' (pen.)	Report	Aguilar 48'; Browne 61'

Estadio Ricardo Saprissa Aymá, San José
Referee: Iván Barton (El Salvador)
1 October 2019
22:00 (21:00 UTC−5)

Independiente (Panama)	0–1	(Costa Rica) Saprissa
	Report	Venegas 56'

Estadio Agustín Sánchez, La Chorrera
Referee: Ismael Cornejo (El Salvador)

Saprissa won 4–2 on aggregate.

26 September 2019
22:00 (20:00 UTC−6)

Olimpia (Honduras)	2–0	(Guatemala) Comunicaciones
Garrido 1'; Alvarado 5'	Report

Estadio Olímpico Metropolitano, San Pedro Sula
Attendance: 0
Referee: Armando Villarreal (United States)
3 October 2019
22:00 (20:00 UTC−6)

Comunicaciones (Guatemala)	0–0	(Honduras) Olimpia
	Report

Estadio Doroteo Guamuch Flores, Guatemala City
Referee: Adonai Escobedo (Mexico)

Olimpia won 2–0 on aggregate.

== Semi-finals ==
In the semi-finals, the matchups were determined as follows:

- SF1: Winner QF1 vs. Winner QF2
- SF2: Winner QF3 vs. Winner QF4

The semi-finalists in each tie which had the better performance in previous rounds (excluding preliminary round) hosted the second leg.

Pos	Team	Pld	W	D	L	GF	GA	GD	Pts	Host
1 (SF1)	(Honduras) Motagua	4	2	2	0	5	2	+3	8	2nd leg
2 (SF1)	(El Salvador) Alianza	4	2	0	2	4	2	+2	6	1st leg
1 (SF2)	(Costa Rica) Saprissa	4	3	0	1	6	3	+3	9	2nd leg
2 (SF2)	(Honduras) Olimpia	4	2	1	1	6	2	+4	7	1st leg

Source: CONCACAF
Rules for classification: 1) Points; 2) Goal difference; 3) Goals scored; 4) Away goals scored; 5) Wins; 6) Away wins; 7) Disciplinary points; 8) Drawing of lots (Regulations II, Article I).

=== Summary ===
The first legs were played on 24 October, and the second legs were played on 31 October 2019.

Team 1	Agg.	Team 2	1st leg	2nd leg
Alianza (El Salvador)	1–4	(Honduras) Motagua	1–1	0–3
Olimpia (Honduras)	3–4	(Costa Rica) Saprissa	2–0	1–4

=== Matches ===
24 October 2019
22:00 (20:00 UTC−6)

Alianza (El Salvador)	1–1	(Honduras) Motagua
Peñaranda 45+2'	Report	Montes 4'

Estadio Cuscatlán, San Salvador
Referee: José Kellys (Panama)
31 October 2019
20:00 (18:00 UTC−6)

Motagua (Honduras)	3–0	(El Salvador) Alianza
Vega 31'; Montes 36'; Estigarribia 88'	Report

Estadio Olímpico Metropolitano, San Pedro Sula
Referee: Fernando Guerrero (Mexico)

Motagua won 4–1 on aggregate.

24 October 2019
20:00 (18:00 UTC−6)

Olimpia (Honduras)	2–0	(Costa Rica) Saprissa
Benguché 24', 80'	Report

Estadio Olímpico Metropolitano, San Pedro Sula
Referee: Ismael Cornejo (El Salvador)
31 October 2019
22:00 (20:00 UTC−6)

Saprissa (Costa Rica)	4–1	(Honduras) Olimpia
Ugalde 32'; Angulo 69', 89'; Ramírez 90+4'	Report	Álvarez 62'

Estadio Ricardo Saprissa Aymá, San José
Referee: Ismail Elfath (United States)

Saprissa won 4–3 on aggregate.

== Final ==
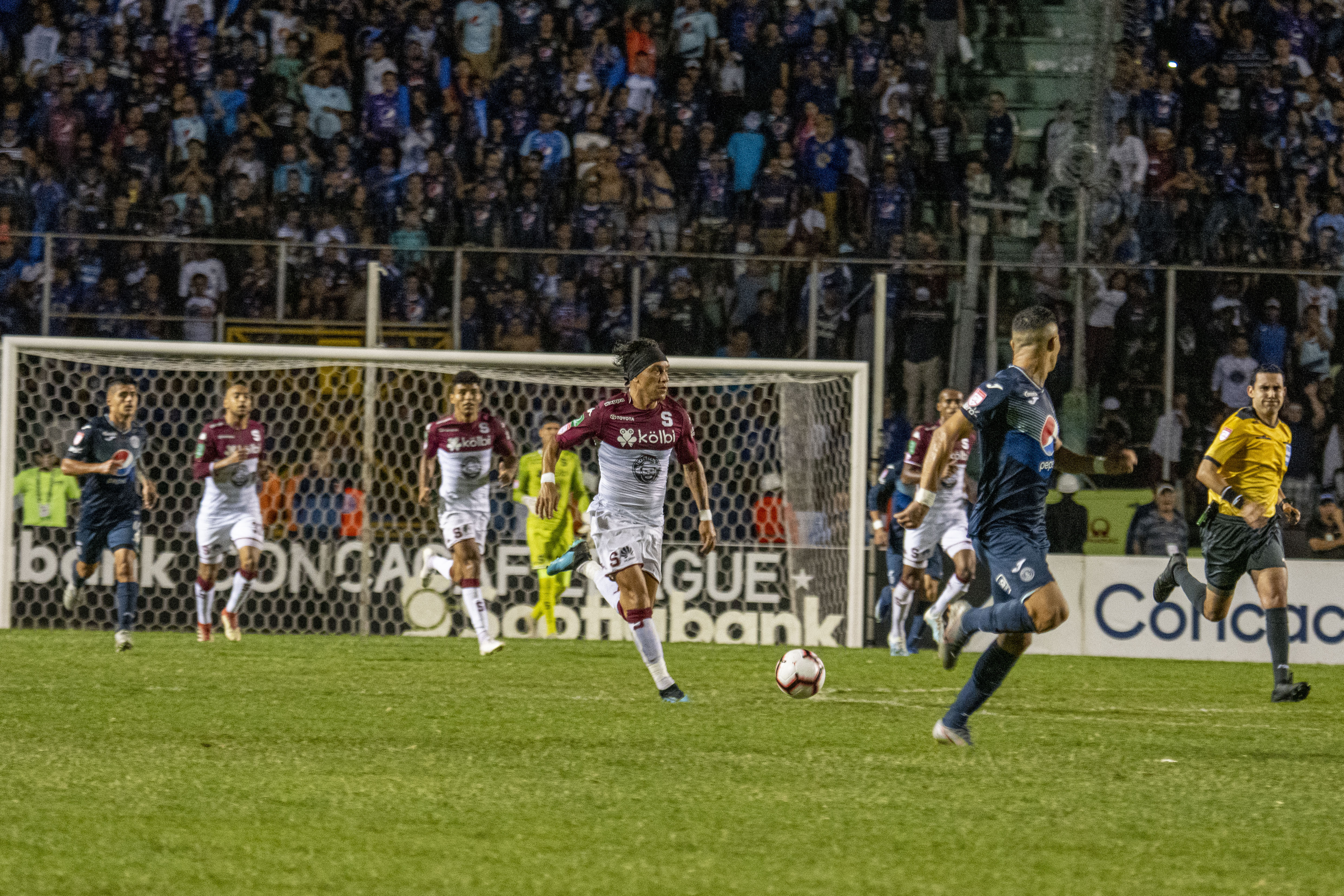
Christian Bolaños with the ball during the second leg of the final

In the final (Winner SF1 vs. Winner SF2), the finalists which had the better performance in previous rounds (excluding preliminary round) hosted the second leg.

Pos	Team	Pld	W	D	L	GF	GA	GD	Pts	Host
1	(Honduras) Motagua	6	3	3	0	9	3	+6	12	2nd leg
2	(Costa Rica) Saprissa	6	4	0	2	10	6	+4	12	1st leg

Source: CONCACAF
Rules for classification: 1) Points; 2) Goal difference; 3) Goals scored; 4) Away goals scored; 5) Wins; 6) Away wins; 7) Disciplinary points; 8) Drawing of lots (Regulations II, Article I).

=== Summary ===
The first leg was played on 7 November, and the second leg was played on 26 November 2019.

Team 1	Agg.	Team 2	1st leg	2nd leg
Saprissa (Costa Rica)	1–0	(Honduras) Motagua	1–0	0–0

=== Matches ===
7 November 2019
21:00 (20:00 UTC−6)

Saprissa (Costa Rica)	1–0	(Honduras) Motagua
Venegas 19'	Report

Estadio Ricardo Saprissa Aymá, San José
Referee: Daneon Parchment (Jamaica)
26 November 2019
22:00 (21:00 UTC−6)

Motagua (Honduras)	0–0	(Costa Rica) Saprissa
	Report

Estadio Tiburcio Carías Andino, Tegucigalpa
Referee: César Ramos (Mexico)

Saprissa won 1–0 on aggregate.

== Top goalscorers ==
Team eliminated or inactive for this round.

Rank	Player	Team	Goals	By round									
Rank	Player	Team	Goals	PR1	PR2	2R1	2R2	QF1	QF2	SF1	SF2	F1	F2
1	(Costa Rica) Johan Venegas	(Costa Rica) Saprissa	7	1		1		3		1		1	
2	(Colombia) Raúl Peñaranda	(El Salvador) Alianza	4	1		1		1		1			
2	(Costa Rica) Manfred Ugalde	(Costa Rica) Saprissa	4	2	1						1		
4	(Costa Rica) Marvin Angulo	(Costa Rica) Saprissa	2								2		
4	(Honduras) Jorge Benguché	(Honduras) Olimpia	2							2			
4	(Canada) David Choinière	(Canada) Forge FC	2	1			1						
4	(Panama) José Fajardo	(Panama) Independiente	2			1	1						
4	(Guatemala) Gerardo Gordillo	(Guatemala) Comunicaciones	2	1		1							
4	(El Salvador) Marvin Monterrosa	(El Salvador) Alianza	2	1				1					
4	(Honduras) Juan Montes	(Honduras) Motagua	2							1	1		

== Qualification to CONCACAF Champions League ==
Starting from the round of 16, teams were ranked based on their results (excluding preliminary round) using the following criteria (Regulations II, Article I):

1. Points (3 points for a win, 1 point for a draw, 0 points for a loss, except that teams advancing via a penalty shoot-out were considered to have won the match and thus earned 3 points);
2. Goal difference;
3. Goals scored;
4. Away goals scored;
5. Wins;
6. Away wins;
7. Disciplinary points (1 point for yellow card, 3 points for indirect red card, 4 points for direct red card, 5 points for yellow card and direct red card);
8. Drawing of lots

Based on the ranking, the top six teams, i.e., champions, runners-up, both losing semi-finalists, and best two losing quarter-finalists, qualified for the 2020 CONCACAF Champions League.

Pos	Team	Pld	W	D	L	GF	GA	GD	Pts	Qualification
1	(Costa Rica) Saprissa	8	5	1	2	11	6	+5	16	Champions; 2020 CONCACAF Champions League
2	(Honduras) Motagua	8	3	4	1	9	4	+5	13	Runners-up; 2020 CONCACAF Champions League
3	(Honduras) Olimpia	6	3	1	2	9	6	+3	10	Semi-finalists; 2020 CONCACAF Champions League
4	(El Salvador) Alianza	6	2	1	3	5	6	−1	7	Semi-finalists; 2020 CONCACAF Champions League
5	(Costa Rica) San Carlos	4	2	1	1	1	2	−1	7	Quarter-finalists; 2020 CONCACAF Champions League
6	(Guatemala) Comunicaciones	4	1	2	1	2	3	−1	5	Quarter-finalists; 2020 CONCACAF Champions League
7	(Jamaica) Waterhouse	4	1	2	1	2	4	−2	5	Quarter-finalists
8	(Panama) Independiente	4	1	1	2	5	6	−1	4	Quarter-finalists
9	(El Salvador) Águila	2	1	0	1	1	2	−1	3 (Note: Disciplinary points: Águila –2, Tauro –4.)	Round of 16
10	(Panama) Tauro	2	1	0	1	1	2	−1	3	Round of 16
11	(Canada) Forge FC	2	1	0	1	2	4	−2	3	Round of 16
12	(Costa Rica) Herediano	2	0	1	1	2	2	0	1	Round of 16
13	(El Salvador) Santa Tecla	2	0	1	1	0	0	0	1	Round of 16
14	(Suriname) Robinhood	2	0	1	1	2	3	−1	1 (Note: Disciplinary points: Robinhood –1, Managua –5.)	Round of 16
15	(Nicaragua) Managua	2	0	1	1	2	3	−1	1	Round of 16
16	(Guatemala) Guastatoya	2	0	1	1	1	2	−1	1	Round of 16

Source: CONCACAF
Rules for classification: 1) Points; 2) Goal difference; 3) Goals scored; 4) Away goals scored; 5) Wins; 6) Away wins; 7) Disciplinary points; 8) Drawing of lots (Regulations II, Article I).

== Awards ==
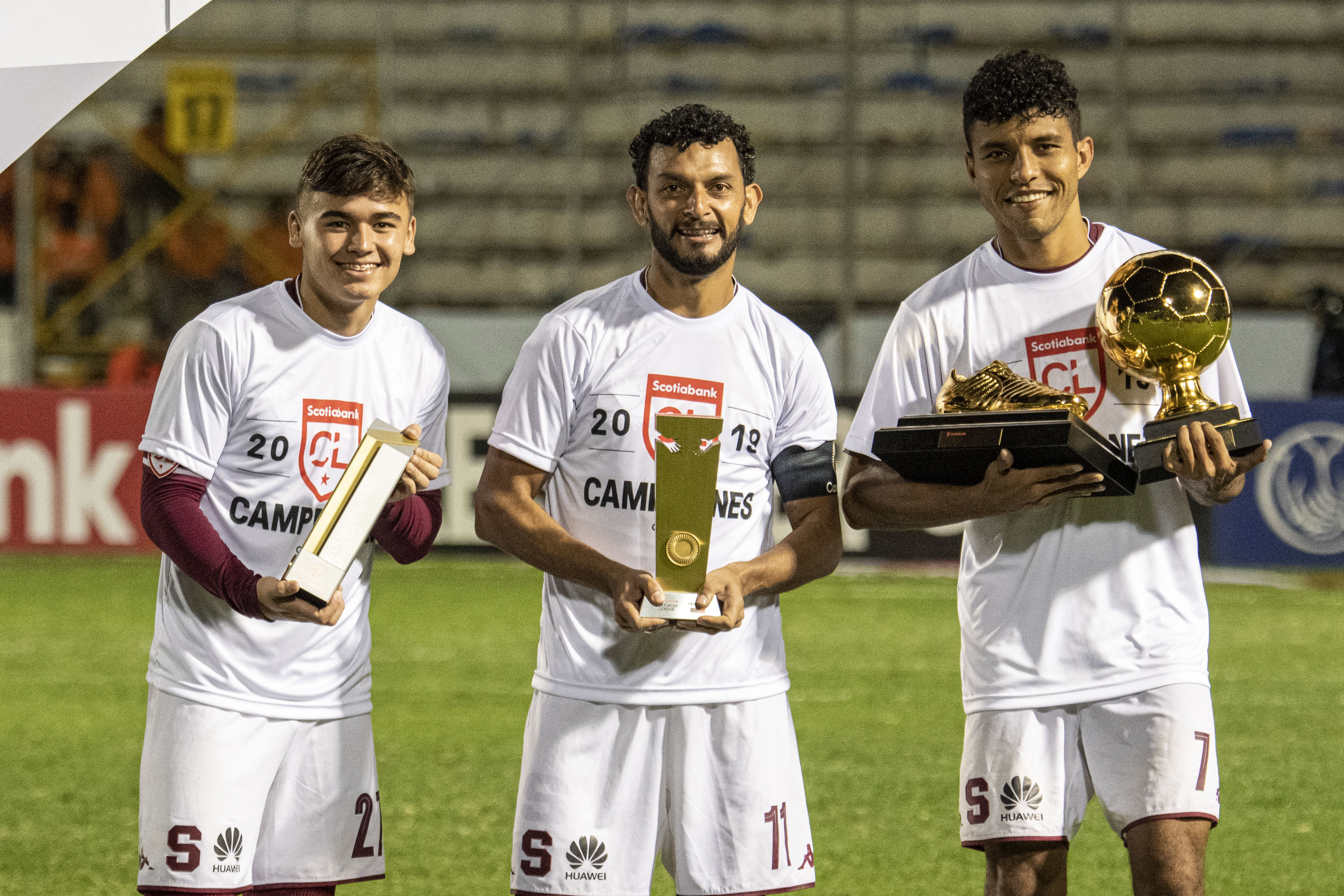
Following their victory in the final, Saprissa players Manfred Ugalde, Michael Barrantes and Johan Venegas (left to right) pose with the Best Young Player, Fair Play Award, Golden Boot and Golden Ball awards, respectively.

The following awards were given at the conclusion of the tournament:

Award	Player	Team
Golden Ball	(Costa Rica) Johan Venegas	(Costa Rica) Saprissa
Golden Boot	(Costa Rica) Johan Venegas	(Costa Rica) Saprissa
Golden Glove	(Argentina) Jonathan Rougier	(Honduras) Motagua
Best Young Player	(Costa Rica) Manfred Ugalde	(Costa Rica) Saprissa
Fair Play Award	—	(Costa Rica) Saprissa

== See also ==
- 2020 CONCACAF Champions League
