= Eliseo Salamanca =

Salvadoran football player (born 1979)

Personal information
- Full name: José Eliseo Salamanca Bermúdez
- Date of birth: October 24, 1979 (age 47)
- Place of birth: San Rafael Oriente, El Salvador
- Height: 1.79 m (5 ft 10 in)
- Position: Midfielder

Senior career*
Years	Team	Apps	(Gls)
1995–2000	Universidad G Barrios		
2001–2006	Águila		
2006–2007	Chalatenango		
2007–2010	Águila	71	(6)
2010	FAS		
2011	UES		
- C.D. Guadalupano

International career^{‡}
2006–2007	El Salvador	3	(0)
- * Club domestic league appearances and goals ‡ National team caps and goals as of 12:34, 8 April 2010 (UTC)

José Eliseo Salamanca Bermúdez (born October 24, 1979) is a Salvadoran professional football player.

== Club career ==
Nicknamed Toro (The Bull), Salamanca started his career at Salvadoran second division side Universidad Gerardo Barrios and joined top tier outfit Águila in 2001. In 2006, he joined Chalatenango only to rejoin Águila a year later. He moved to FAS for the 2010 Apertura and played the 2011 Clausura for UES.

== International career ==
Salamanca made his debut for El Salvador in a September 2006 friendly match against Honduras and has earned a total of 3 caps, scoring no goals. He has represented his country at the 2007 UNCAF Nations Cup.

His final international game was a February 2007 UNCAF Nations Cup match against Guatemala.
