= Erick Rivera (footballer, born 1989) =

Salvadoran footballer

Personal information
- Full name: Erick Alejandro Rivera
- Date of birth: 10 October 1989 (age 37)
- Place of birth: Santa Tecla, El Salvador
- Height: 1.90 m (6 ft 3 in)
- Position: Forward

Senior career*
Years	Team	Apps	(Gls)
2010–2012	C.D. Salvadoreño	39	(7)
2013	Firpo	9	(2)
2013	Santa Tecla	8	(0)
2014	Juventud Independiente	26	(3)
2015	FAS	11	(0)
2016–2018	Suchitepequez	4	(0)
2018–2018	Municipal Limeno	20	(2)
2018–2019	Santa Tecla	34	(6)
2019–2021	Club Aurora	20	(5)
2021–2022	Santa Tecla	10	(1)

International career^{‡}
2020–2022	El Salvador	5	(0)
- * Club domestic league appearances and goals as of 25 September 2020 ‡ National team caps and goals as of 25 September 2020

Erick Alejandro Rivera (born 10 October 1989) is a Salvadoran professional footballer who plays as a forward.

== Club career ==
=== Aurora ===
On 6 January 2020, Rivera was signed to Bolivian club Club Aurora. He made his Aurora debut in January 2020 in a 4–0 win over Real Potosi, he ended up scoring a goal in his third game against Jorge Wilstermann. He made 12 appearances and score 3 goals, before the season was suspended due to the COVID-19 Pandemic.

On 10 June 2020, he signed a one-year contract extension to remain in Bolivia.

On 15 August 2022, Rivera was banned from all football until 5 October 2025 due to testing positive for clostebol – a synthetic derivative of a muscle-building steroid that the body naturally produces in larger amounts in men – following after a 3–0 loss to Canada on 8 September 2021

== Honours ==
Santa Tecla

- Copa El Salvador: 2018–19
