= Manfred Ugalde =

Costa Rican football player (born 2002)

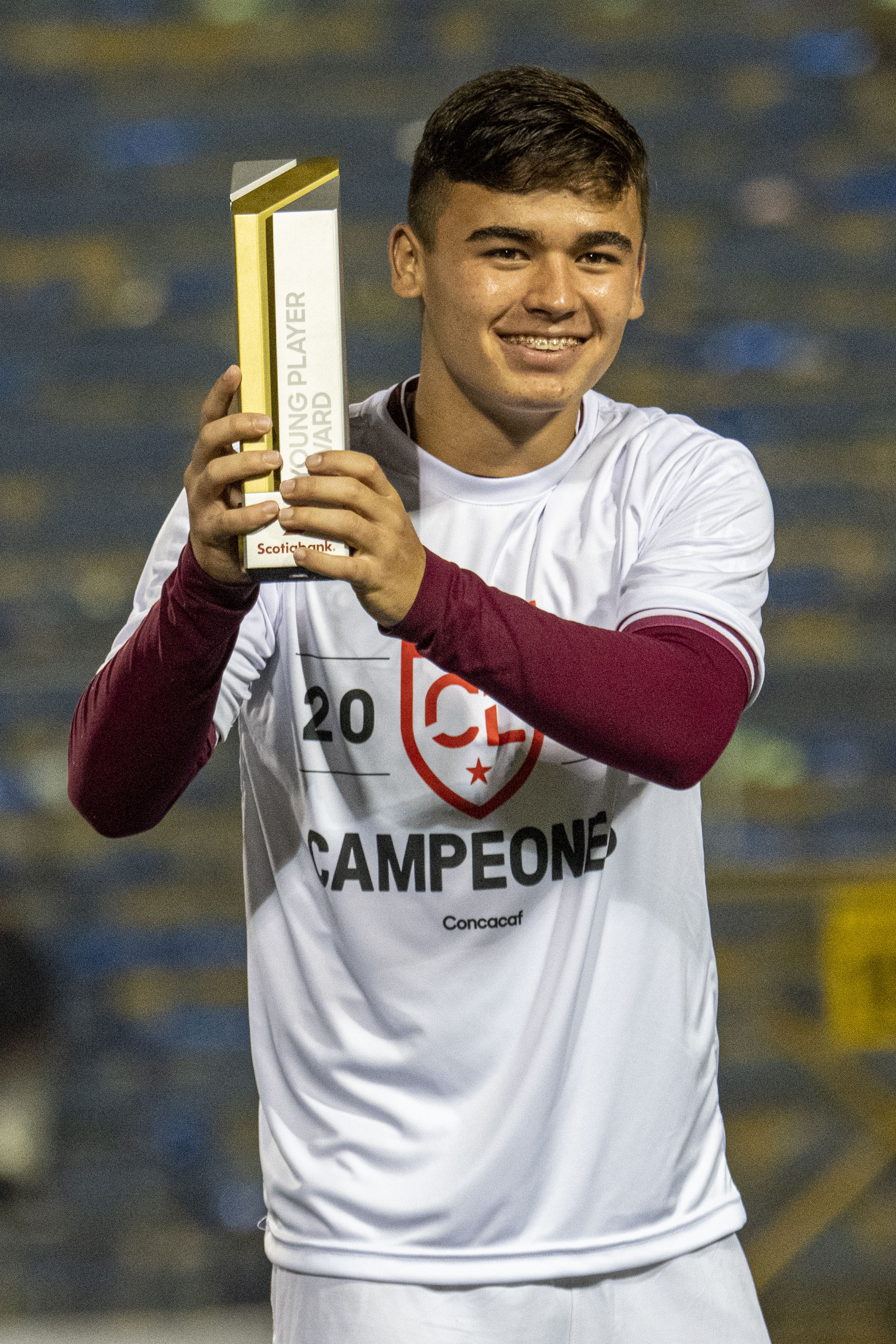
- Ugalde celebrating the CONCACAF League with Saprissa in 2019

Personal information
- Full name: Manfred Alonso Ugalde Arce
- Date of birth: 25 May 2002 (age 24)
- Place of birth: Heredia, Costa Rica
- Height: 1.72 m (5 ft 8 in)
- Position: Forward

Team information
- Current team: Spartak Moscow
- Number: 9

Senior career*
Years	Team	Apps	(Gls)
2019–2020	Saprissa	37	(13)
2020–2023	Lommel	22	(11)
2021–2023	→ Twente (loan)	49	(11)
2023–2024	Twente	18	(7)
2024–	Spartak Moscow	85	(28)

International career^{‡}
2018–2019	Costa Rica U17	5	(3)
2020–	Costa Rica U23	3	(1)
2020–	Costa Rica	35	(11)
- * Club domestic league appearances and goals as of 22 November 2026 ‡ National team caps and goals as of 17 November 2026

Manfred Alonso Ugalde Arce (born 25 May 2002) is a Costa Rican professional footballer who plays as a forward for Russian Premier League club Spartak Moscow and the Costa Rica national team.

== Club career ==
=== Saprissa ===
Debuting for Saprissa in early 2019, Ugalde scored two goals in a 3–1 victory over Belmopan Bandits in CONCACAF League play on 31 July 2019. He scored his first professional hat-trick in a 6–0 victory over Limón on 21 October. In November, Ugalde was named as the Best Younger Player of the 2019 CONCACAF League tournament, with four goals in seven matches.

=== Lommel ===
In July 2020 Ugalde signed a contract with City Football Group and joined Challenger Pro League club Lommel.

==== Loan to Twente ====
On 25 June 2021, Ugalde joined Eredivisie side Twente on a season-long loan deal. On 1 July 2022, the loan was renewed for the 2022–23 season.

=== Twente ===
On 6 July 2023, Ugalde signed for Twente on a permanent basis for four years.

=== Spartak Moscow ===
On 29 January 2024, Ugalde moved to Russian Premier League club Spartak Moscow on a four-and-a-half-year contract. On 23 November 2024, Ugalde scored 4 goals in a 5–2 victory against Lokomotiv Moscow, taking the top spot in the league goalscorers' race with 12 goals. He went into the winter break of the Russian season in December with 15 goals scored. He became the league's top scorer of the season with 17 goals.

== International career ==
Ugalde made his international senior debut for Costa Rica on 1 February 2020 against the United States, coming on as a substitute for Marco Ureña in a 1–0 defeat.

In September 2021 after a difficult international window for Costa Rica during the third round of 2022 FIFA World Cup qualification and criticisms of his performance by head coach Luis Fernando Suárez, Ugalde announced he would no longer accept call-ups to Los Ticos as long as Suárez remained coach.

After the dismissal of Luis Fernando Suárez after the 2023 CONCACAF Gold Cup, In August 2023 Ugalde accepted a call-up from interim coach Claudio Vivas to Costa Rica ahead of a friendly against Saudi Arabia. During the match on September 8, he scored his first goal for his country, netting the second goal in an eventual 3–1 victory.

== Career statistics ==
=== Club ===
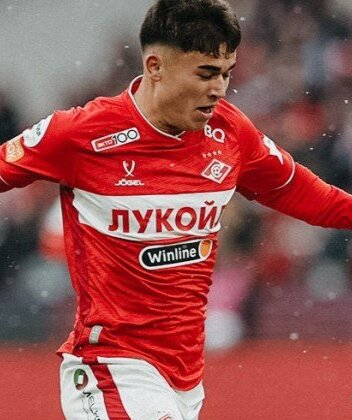
Ugalde with Spartak Moscow

As of match played 22 November 2026

Appearances and goals by club, season and competition
Club	Season	League			National cup (Note: Includes Belgian Cup, KNVB Cup, Russian Cup)		Continental		Other		Total	
Club	Season	Division	Apps	Goals	Apps	Goals	Apps	Goals	Apps	Goals	Apps	Goals
Saprissa	2018–19	Liga FPD	7	1	—		8 (Note: Appearances in CONCACAF League)	4	—		15	5
Saprissa	2019–20	Liga FPD	30	12	—		2 (Note: Appearances in CONCACAF Champions League)	0	5 (Note: Appearances in Liga FPD play-offs)	0	37	12
Saprissa	Total		37	13	—		10	4	5	0	52	17
Lommel	2020–21	Challenger Pro League	22	11	1	0	—		—		23	11
Twente (loan)	2021–22	Eredivisie	25	3	3	1	—		—		28	4
Twente (loan)	2022–23	Eredivisie	24	8	2	0	1 (Note: Appearance(s) in UEFA Europa Conference League)	0	4 (Note: Appearances in Eredividie European play-offs)	1	31	9
Twente (loan)	Total		49	11	5	1	1	0	4	1	59	13
Twente	2023–24	Eredivisie	18	7	1	1	6	1	—		25	9
Spartak Moscow	2023–24	Russian Premier League	12	0	4	1	—		—		16	1
Spartak Moscow	2024–25	Russian Premier League	29	17	7	1	—		—		36	18
Spartak Moscow	2025–26	Russian Premier League	29	5	9	3	—		—		38	8
Spartak Moscow	2026–27	Russian Premier League	15	6	5	4	—		1 (Note: Appearance in Russian Super Cup)	0	21	10
Spartak Moscow	Total		85	28	25	9	—		1	0	111	37
Career total			211	70	32	11	17	5	10	1	270	87

=== International ===
As of match played 17 November 2026

Appearances and goals by national team and year
National team	Year	Apps	Goals
Costa Rica	2020	1	0
Costa Rica	2021	1	0
Costa Rica	2023	4	1
Costa Rica	2024	12	2
Costa Rica	2025	13	8
Costa Rica	2026	4	0
Total		35	11

Scores and results list Costa Rica's goal tally first.

List of international goals scored by Manfred Ugalde
No.	Date	Venue	Opponent	Score	Result	Competition
1	8 September 2023	St James' Park, Newcastle upon Tyne, England	Saudi Arabia	2–0	3–1	Friendly
2	26 March 2024	Los Angeles Memorial Coliseum, Los Angeles, United States	Argentina	1–0	1–3	Friendly
3	9 June 2024	Kirani James Athletic Stadium, St. George's, Grenada	Grenada	1–0	3–0	2026 FIFA World Cup qualification
4	21 March 2025	FFB Stadium, Belmopan, Belize	Belize	1–0	7–0	2025 CONCACAF Gold Cup qualification
5	21 March 2025	FFB Stadium, Belmopan, Belize	Belize	2–0	7–0	2025 CONCACAF Gold Cup qualification
6	25 March 2025	Estadio Nacional, San José, Costa Rica	Belize	4–0	6–1	2025 CONCACAF Gold Cup qualification
7	7 June 2025	BFA Technical Centre, Wildey, Barbados	Bahamas	5–0	8–0	2026 FIFA World Cup qualification
8	15 June 2025	Snapdragon Stadium, San Diego, United States	Suriname	2–0	4–3	2025 CONCACAF Gold Cup
9	15 June 2025	Snapdragon Stadium, San Diego, United States	Suriname	4–3	4–3	2025 CONCACAF Gold Cup
10	18 June 2025	AT&T Stadium, Arlington, United States	Dominican Republic	1–0	2–1	2025 CONCACAF Gold Cup
11	14 October 2025	Estadio Nacional, San José, Costa Rica	Nicaragua	3–1	4–1	2026 FIFA World Cup qualification

== Honours ==
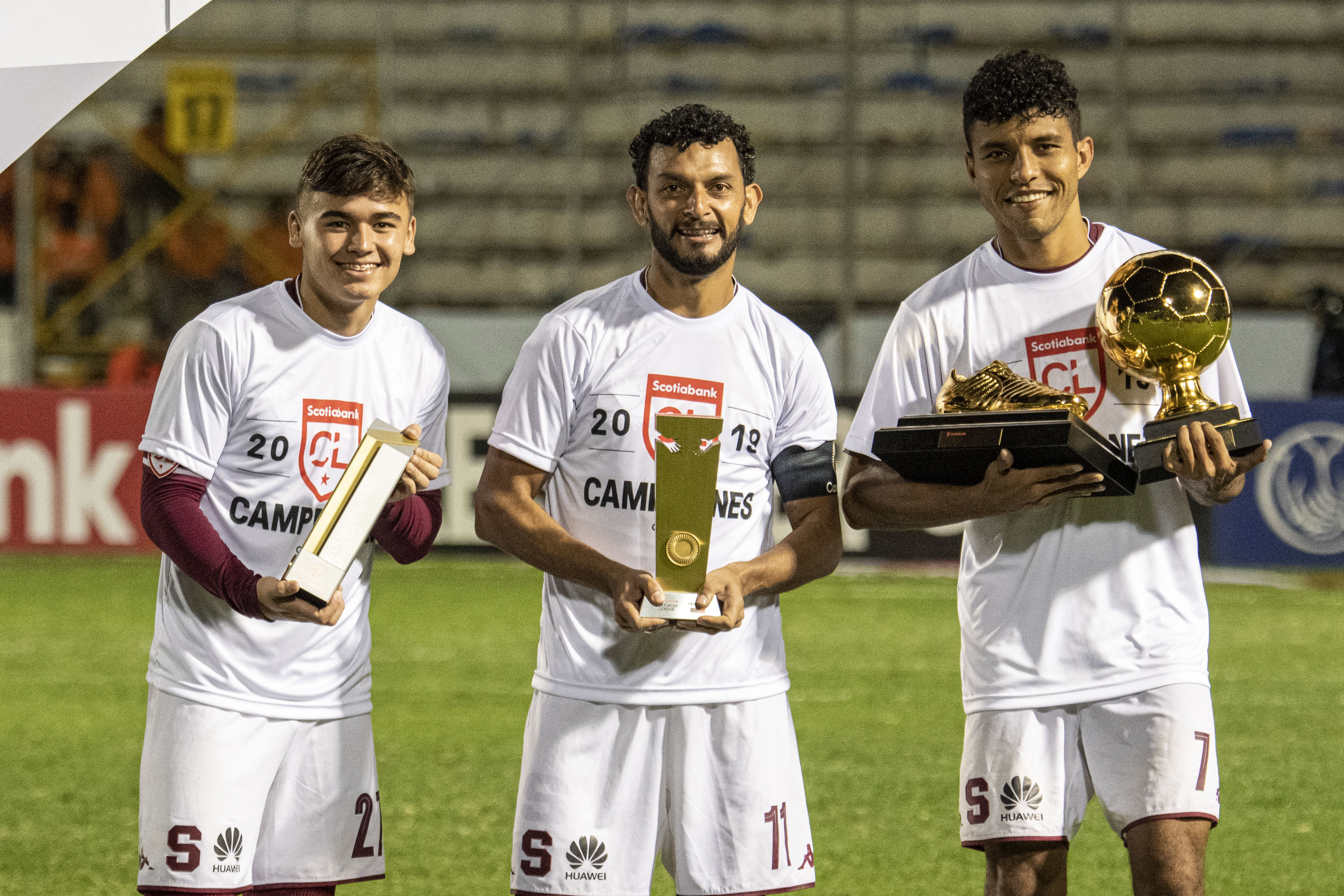
Ugalde (left) won the 2019 CONCACAF League with Saprissa, while also winning the Best Young Player award of the tournament

Saprissa

- Liga FPD: Clausura 2020
- CONCACAF League: 2019

Spartak Moscow

- Russian Cup: 2025–26

Individual

- CONCACAF League Best Young Player: 2019,
- Eredivisie Talent of the Month: March 2023
- Russian Premier League Player of the Month: November/December 2024.
- Russian Premier League top scorer: 2024–25 (17 goals).
