= Jaikel Medina =

Costa Rican footballer (born 1992)

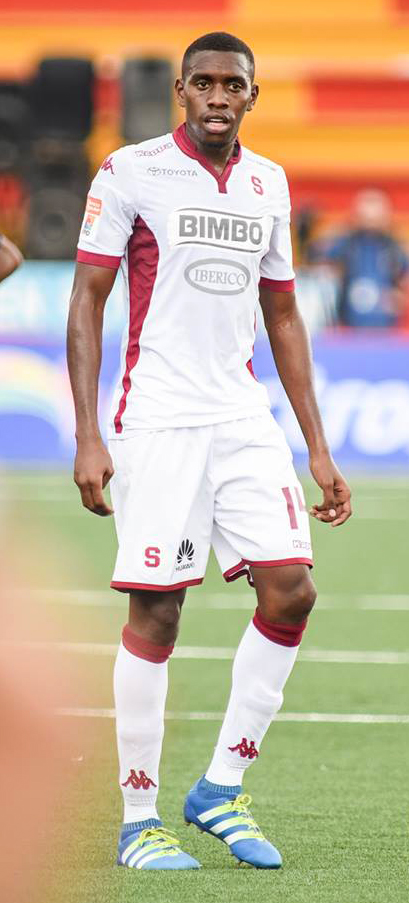
- Medina in 2016

Personal information
- Full name: Jaikel Lloyd Medina Scarlett
- Date of birth: 8 January 1992 (age 34)
- Place of birth: Alajuela, Costa Rica
- Positions: Defender; midfielder

Senior career*
Years	Team	Apps	(Gls)
-2011/12	Orión F.C.	3	(0)
2012-2015/16	C.S. Uruguay de Coronado	72	(4)
2015/2016	A.D. Municipal Liberia	16	(1)
2016-2020	Deportivo Saprissa	97	(4)
2020	A.D. Municipal Pérez Zeledón	9	(1)
2021-2022	Sporting San Jose	7	(0)
2022-2023	Malacateco	33	(0)
- * Club domestic league appearances and goals

Jaikel Medina (born 8 January 1992 in Costa Rica) is a Costa Rican footballer.
