= Marvin Angulo =

Costa Rican footballer (born 1986)

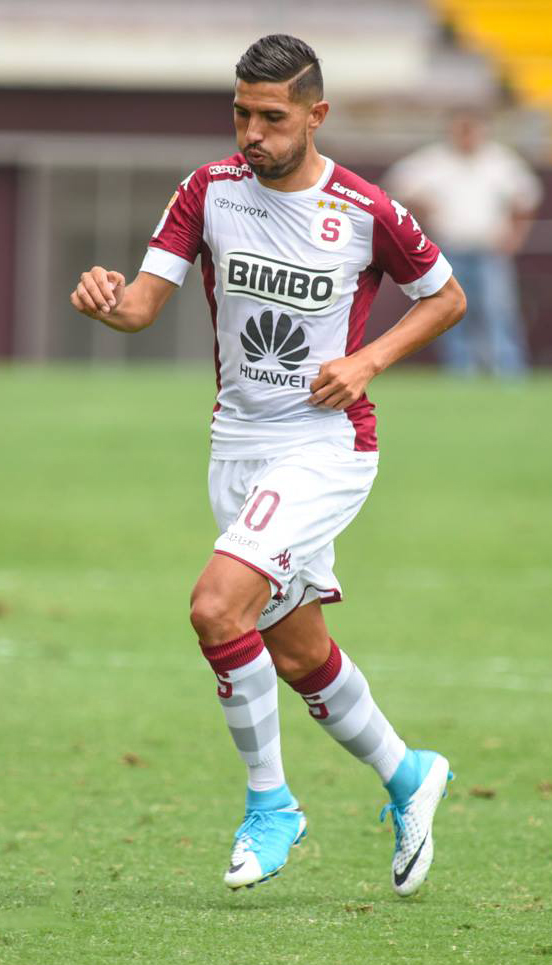
- Angulo playing for Saprissa in 2017

Personal information
- Full name: Marvin Jesús Angulo Borbón
- Date of birth: 30 September 1986 (age 40)
- Place of birth: Heredia, Costa Rica
- Height: 1.72 m (5 ft 8 in)
- Position: Attacking midfielder

Team information
- Current team: Municipal Liberia
- Number: 10

Senior career*
| Years | Team | Apps | (Gls) |
| 2006–2010 | Herediano | 46 | (9) |
| 2009–2010 | → Melbourne Victory (loan) | 10 | (0) |
| 2010–2011 | Melbourne Victory | 27 | (0) |
| 2011–2013 | Herediano | 45 | (2) |
| 2013–2014 | Uruguay de Coronado | 41 | (6) |
| 2014–2023 | Deportivo Saprissa | 366 | (69) |
| 2023– | Municipal Liberia | 75 | (13) |

International career^{‡}
| 2007– | Costa Rica | 10 | (0) |
- * Club domestic league appearances and goals as of 7 May 2025 ‡ National team caps and goals as of 14 October 2020

Marvin Jesús Angulo Borbón (born 30 September 1986) is a Costa Rican professional footballer who plays for Municipal Liberia.

== Club career ==
On 1 October 2009 it was thought he will join the Melbourne Victory from CS Herediano as an injury replacement player for Billy Celeski. The deal was agreed in principle on 21 September 2009. However, he was yet to gain clearance from FIFA, and was unable to take the field for Melbourne Victory until the 10 January 2010 fixture against the Newcastle Jets.

He was released by Melbourne Victory during the 10–11 off-season and returned to Herediano, despite rumours of Melbourne wanting to extend his loan. In 2016, he was linked to a transfer to the Major League Soccer team New York Red Bulls.

== International career ==
Angulo has made two appearances for the Costa Rica national football team, his debut coming in a friendly against Peru on 22 August 2007. In January 2008 he played his second and final international against Sweden.

== Honours ==
Herediano

- Liga FPD: Clausura 2012

Saprissa

- Liga FPD: Clausura 2014, Apertura 2014, Apertura 2015, Apertura 2016, Clausura 2018, Clausura 2020, Clausura 2021
- CONCACAF League: 2019

Individual

- Liga FPD Player of the Year: Apertura 2007, Apertura 2015, Apertura 2016
