= Aarón Cruz =

Costa Rican footballer (born 1991)

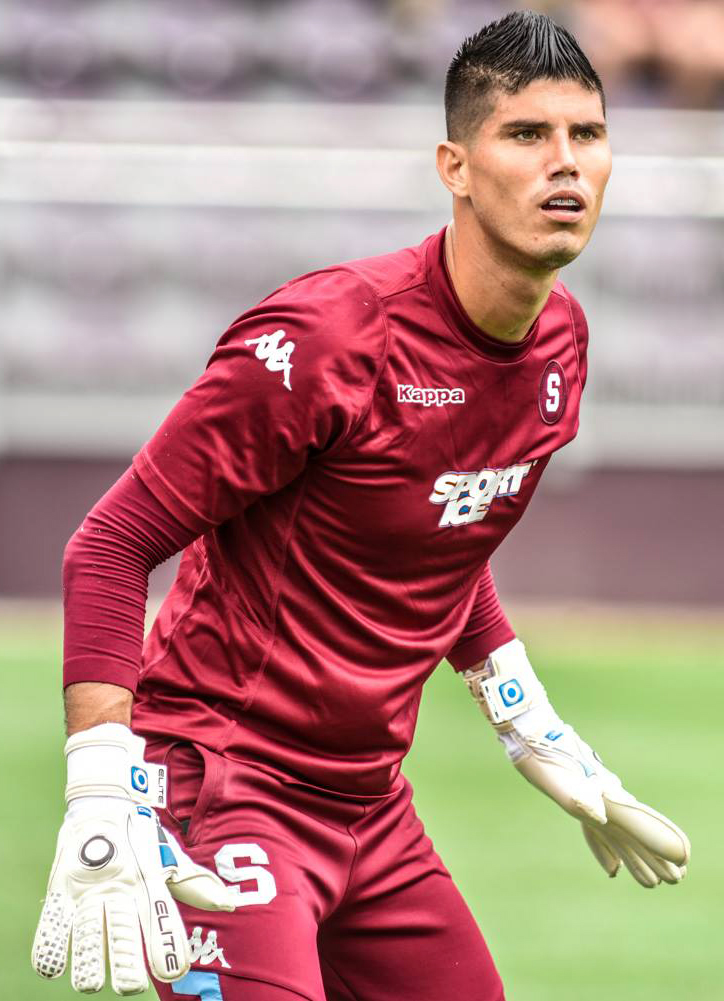
- Cruz with Saprissa in 2017

Personal information
- Full name: Aarón Moisés Cruz Esquivel
- Date of birth: 25 May 1991 (age 35)
- Place of birth: San Carlos, Costa Rica
- Height: 1.81 m (5 ft 11 in)
- Position: Goalkeeper

Team information
- Current team: Herediano
- Number: 1

Senior career*
Years	Team	Apps	(Gls)
2010–2012	San Carlos	10	(0)
2015	San Carlos	2	(0)
2015	Pérez Zeledón	0	(0)
2015–2017	La U Universitarios	35	(0)
2017–2023	Saprissa	168	(0)
2023–	Herediano	51	(0)

International career^{‡}
2011	Costa Rica U20	3	(0)
2021–	Costa Rica	6	(0)
- * Club domestic league appearances and goals as of 1 November 2025 ‡ National team caps and goals as of 2 February 2024

Aarón Moisés Cruz Esquivel (born 25 May 1991) is a Costa Rican professional footballer who plays as a goalkeeper for Liga FPD club Herediano.

== Club career ==
=== A. D. San Carlos ===
On 22 January 2011, Cruz made his professional debut with San Carlos, playing all 90 minutes in the 2–1 home win over Barrio México. He made just one more league appearance that season as San Carlos reached the finals, where they were defeated by Alajuelense.

At the 2011 Winter Championships, Cruz made 7 appearances, while his team finished in eighth place with 21 points. In Summer 2012 he only saw action for one game. On 19 January 2011, Cruz unexpectedly announced his retirement at age 20, to devote more time to his PE career.

On 14 January 2015, the team issued a press release and made Cruz's return official for the Closing Tournament in the Costa Rican Second Division. He appeared as a substitute on 21 January in the visit to Generación Saprissa, the match that concluded tied at a goal. After waiting on the bench, he started on 8 April in the match that faced CD Liberia at the Carlos Ugalde Stadium. Cruz conceded a goal in the 0–1 defeat. His team finished in ninth place in group A.

=== Pérez Zeledón ===
In mid-2015, Cruz signed with Pérez Zeledón, returning to the top flight. However, the team went through a performance crisis that was forced to separate several players, including Cruz himself, and he never made his team debut. The other dismissed were Pedro Leal, Daniel Ramírez, Cristian Bermúdez, and Julián Pino.

=== La U Universitarios ===
Cruz signed with La U Universitarios ahead of the 2015 Winter tournament. He made his team debut on 25 October, playing the full 90 minutes in a 1–0 win against Carmelita at the Ecological Stadium. Cruz made seven appearances on the season as his club finished seventh. In the 2016 Summer Championship, he began a regular part of the starting lineup for manager Guilherme Farinha. Cruz played 21 games and conceded 29 goals. The team finished in sixth place. Cruz missed the first round of the 2016 Winter Championship due to a broken finger. He returned on 21 September in a 4–0 defeat to Deportivo Saprissa. In all competitions, he played 7 matches with 664 minutes of participation.

=== Deportivo Saprissa ===
On 20 December 2016, Deportivo Saprissa announced that they had signed Cruz for three and a half years. Cruz was the starter on the first date of the Apertura 2017. For the start of the 2017 Summer Championship on 8 January, the Saprissista team had a visit to the Carlos Ugalde Stadium, where they faced San Carlos. On his side, Cruz made his official debut with the number "22" and conceded a goal in the 1–0 defeat.

The resumption of the Concacaf Champions League, in the first leg of the quarterfinals, took place on 21 February, the date on which his club hosted Pachuca at the Ricardo Saprissa Stadium. He was left as a substitute and the process of the match was consumed in a scoreless draw.

On 28 February was the second leg of the continental tournament, at the Hidalgo Stadium. The final score was 4–0 in favor of the Tuzos. On 12 April, in the rough game against Pérez Zeledón at the Ricardo Saprissa Stadium, his club was losing just four minutes into the second half. The defensive block of the generals closed the spaces to Saprissa to deploy the offensive system of coach Carlos Watson, but at the 85th minute, his teammate Daniel Colindres assisted Fabrizio Ronchetti, who scored with his left leg. Shortly before the end of the supplementary stage, defender Dave Myrie scored the winning goal 2–1. With the win, the Saprissa secured the tournament lead in the absence of a qualifying round commitment.

With a 1–2 loss at home against Santos de Guápiles, his team reached third place in the home run and thus was established in the last instance by not having obtained the first place again. On 17 May, the first leg of the final against Herediano took place at the Rosabal Cordero Stadium. The goalkeeper saw no action in the 3–0 loss. In the return match on 21 May at the Ricardo Saprissa Stadium, they were defeated 2–0, thus losing by an aggregate score of 5–0.

He made his 2017 season debut on July 30 at home at the "Fello" Meza de Cartago Stadium against Carmelita. Cruz conceded two goals in the 4–2 victory. The Saprissistas advanced to the home run in second place with 43 points, and at the end of it, the Tibaseño team was left without possibilities of opting for the title. Cruz made eight appearances, executed nineteen interventions and one shutout.

Ahead of the 2018 Closing Tournament, Saprissa promoted assistant Vladimir Quesada to the manager position due to the retirement of Carlos Watson. Cruz appeared as a starter for the 90 minutes in the 0–3 victory over Liberia at the Edgardo Baltodano Stadium, where he had a relatively quiet game in his goal which kept him undefeated. On 20 May, he was proclaimed champion of the tournament with his club after beating Herediano in the penalty shootout. Cruz made 15 appearances, intervened 27 times and recorded 5 shutouts.

He faced his first match of the 2019 Clausura Tournament on 3 January, reaching all the minutes in the 2–2 draw at home against Limón. On 15 May, he obtained the runner-up of the contest.

He began the 2019 Opening Tournament with a 1–0 loss against San Carlos, in which Cruz started. On 28 July, he was sent off in the match against Santos de Guápiles after having intercepted with his hands in a clear play of goal outside the area, for which he received a two-game suspension. On 26 November, he was proclaimed champion of the 2019 Concacaf League, after defeating Motagua from Honduras in the final.

He played the first date of the 2020 Closing Tournament on 11 January against San Carlos at the Carlos Ugalde Stadium. Cruz reached all the minutes and left the fence undefeated in the 1–0 win. In the competition he was the most regular player on the team with 23 appearances. On 29 June, he won the national title with Saprissa, after beating Alajuelense in the final series. On 7 July, Cruz renewed his contract until May 2023.

The new season began on 15 August 2020, for the first date of the Opening Tournament with a 4–0 home victory over Limón. In this competition he made 18 appearances.

He made his debut on the first day of the 2021 Closing Tournament on 13 January, as a starter in the goalless draw against Municipal Grecia. On 21 February, he suffered a muscle tear and was ruled out for two to three weeks. On 9 March, he was allowed to play after his recovery. His team entered the semifinals of the tournament in fourth place.

On 16 May, he was the hero in stopping a penalty shot from Bryan Ruiz, for the first leg, and three days later he stopped a shot at Ruiz himself. The purple team made it to the final after defeating Alajuelense with a 5–6 aggregate. He was the starting keeper in both legs and was proclaimed champion by winning the series. Cruz had saved most penalties in the championship (4). On 17 June, he was named the best goalkeeper of the contest.

== International career ==
=== Youth ===
On 23 November 2010, Cruz participated in the 2011 CONCACAF Under-20 Championship qualification held in Guatemala. Costa Rica beat Nicaragua 4–0 and lost to Panama 1–0. They obtained second place in the table and played the playoffs against El Salvador. The round-trip games ended 1–0 and 1–1, in favor of the Salvadorans, but they were disqualified for fielding an ineligible player. Costa Rica won the series by default and thus qualified for the regional tournament.

The Costa Rica U20s participated at the 2011 FIFA U-20 World Cup in Colombia, and were placed in a group with Spain, Australia and Ecuador. Cruz remained on the bench for all three group stage matches. Costa Rica suffered a 4–1 defeat to Spain before beating Australia 3–2. They were then defeated 3–0 by Ecuador in the final group stage game. Costa Rica advanced to the next stage among the best third parties. On 9 August, they faced the hosts, Colombia, in the round of 16 at the Estadio El Campín in Bogotá. Cruz started and the score ended 3–2 in favor of the Colombians, leaving his country eliminated.

=== Senior ===
On 14 March 2019, Cruz received his first call up to the senior national team by Gustavo Matosas, to face a couple of friendlies of the month. On 24 March 23, a day after the game against Guatemala, Cruz was left on the bench, with a muscle injury that was confirmed in training that prevented him from continuing to concentrate. His place was taken over by Marco Madrigal.

On 23 January 2020, Cruz was called up again by new manager Rónald González Brenes, with the purpose of making a blank on a non-FIFA date. He remained on the bench in a match against the United States at Dignity Health Sports Park on 1 February as Costa Rica lost 1–0.

On 9 May 2021, Cruz was named in the preliminary squad to participate in the 2021 CONCACAF Nations League Finals. He was included in the final 23-man roster on 25 May. However, Cruz tested positive for COVID-19, and was replaced by Patrick Sequeira on 27 May.
