= Universidad Gerardo Barrios =

Salvadorian university

Gerardo Barrios University
- Universidad Gerardo Barrios
- Other names: Universidad; UGB
- Location: Las Flores Street and Las Magnolias Avenue, Escolan Colony, San Miguel, El Salvador
- Website: https://ugb.edu.sv/

Universidad Gerardo Barrios, commonly known as Universidad, is a private university in San Miguel, El Salvador.
