= Ricardo Blanco (Costa Rican footballer) =

Costa Rican footballer (born 1989)

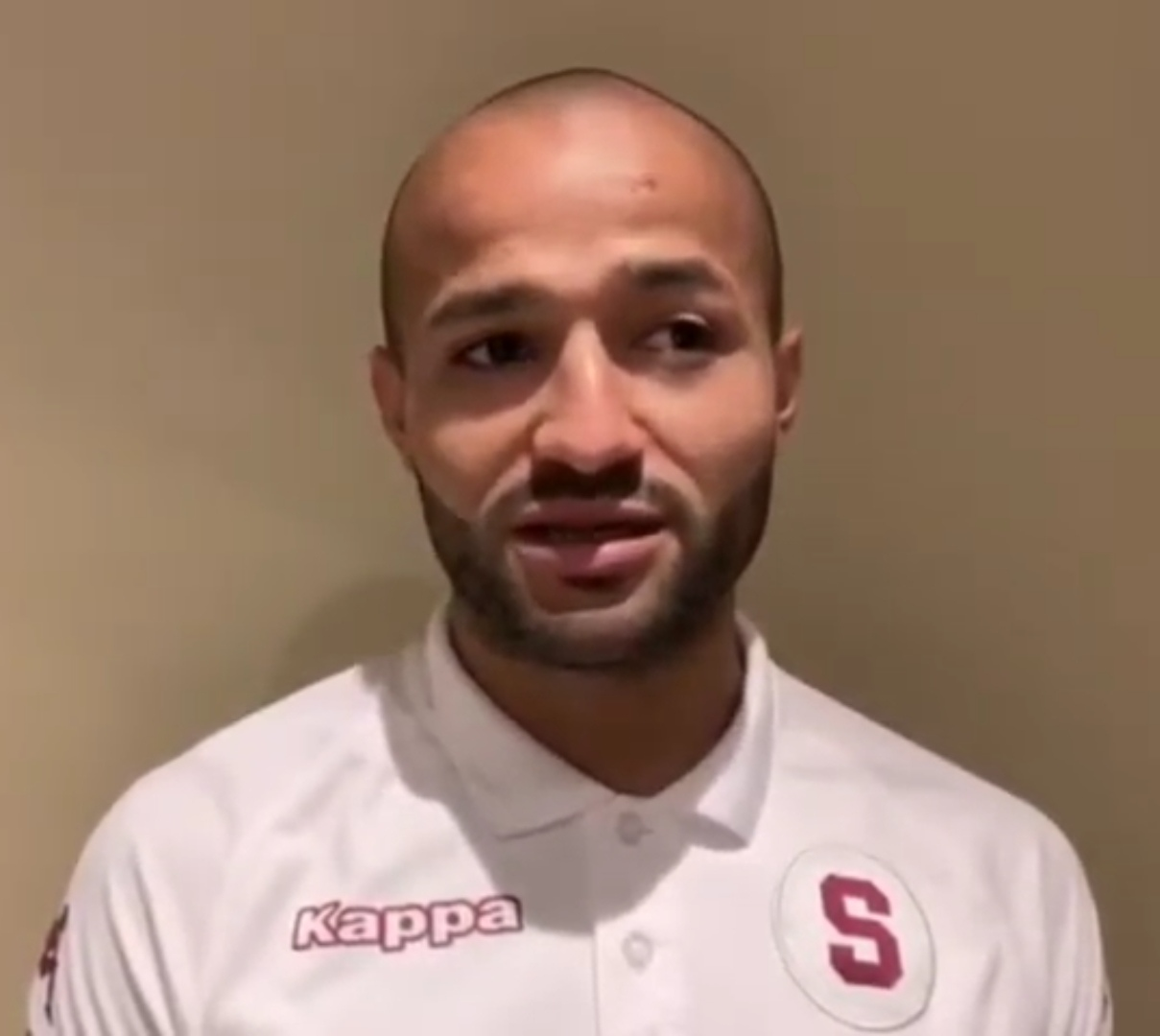

Personal information
- Full name: Ricardo Jose Blanco Mora
- Date of birth: 12 May 1989 (age 37)
- Place of birth: Alajuela, Costa Rica
- Height: 1.72 m (5 ft 8 in)
- Position: Left back

Team information
- Current team: Saprissa
- Number: 12

Senior career*
Years	Team	Apps	(Gls)
2009–2012	Saprissa	44	(0)
2012–2016	Belén	95	(13)
2014	→ Herediano (loan)	8	(0)
2016–2018	Cartaginés	86	(6)
2018–	Saprissa	161	(4)

International career
2010–2022	Costa Rica	15	(0)
- * Club domestic league appearances and goals as of 23:33, 18 June 2024 (UTC)

Ricardo Jose Blanco Mora (born 12 May 1989) is a Costa Rican professional footballer who plays as a left-back for Liga FPD club Saprissa.
