= Winter Classic (disambiguation) =

Winter Classic often refers to the NHL Winter Classic, a series of in-season outdoor ice-hockey games played in the National Hockey League (NHL) in North American professional ice hockey.

Winter Classic may also refer to:

== Ice hockey ==
- GET Winter Classic, a 2017 regular season outdoor game played in the Norwegian GET-ligaen in the 2016–17 GET-ligaen season
- ICEHL Winter Classic, a series played in the International Central European Hockey League (ICE Hockey League)
- NLA Winter Classic, a series played in the Swiss National League A (NLA); such as the 2014 game played in the Stade de Genève
- SDHL Winter Classic, a series of games, such as the 2017 game played by Djurgårdens IF Hockey (women) of the Swedish Women's Hockey League (SDHL)
- Talviklassikko (Finnish: Winter Classic), a series of outdoor games in Finland

== Other uses ==
- A Whitehorse Winter Classic, a 2018 album by Whitehorse (band)

== Similarly named ==
A number of ice hockey games have similar names, including:

In the American Hockey League (AHL)

- AHL All-Star Classic, branding of the league's all-star activities, first used during the 1995–96 season
- AHL Outdoor Classic, a recurring series first played in 2010

In the National Hockey League (NHL)

- NHL 100 Classic, a game played in Ottawa in December 2017
- NHL Centennial Classic, a game played in Toronto in January 2017
- NHL Heritage Classic, an infrequent series of games contested in Canadian football stadiums

In other leagues

- 2016 Outdoor Women's Classic, an outdoor game between National Women's Hockey League teams played in December 2015 in Massachusetts, U.S.
- DEL Winter Game, a series of outdoor games in the Deutsche Eishockey Liga (German Ice Hockey League)

== See also ==
- Outdoor Classic (disambiguation)
- Fall Classic
- Spring Classic
- Summer Classic
