= Outdoor Classic =

Outdoor Classic or outdoor classic may refer to:

- AHL Outdoor Classic, series of annual outdoor ice hockey games in the AHL
- Liberty Outdoor Classic, first outdoor pro regular season basketball game
- NHL Outdoor Classic, National Hockey League outdoor games
- 2016 Outdoor Women's Classic, first outdoor pro game in women's ice hockey (NWHL+CWHL interleague play)

== See also ==
- Outdoor Women's Classic, a series of outdoor women's ice hockey games
- Winter Classic (disambiguation), including outdoor classics in winter
- Classic (disambiguation)#Sports
- Classics (disambiguation)#Sports
