= St. Monica Academy (Montrose, California) =

Catholic school in California, United States

Location
- 2361 Del Mar Rd. Montrose, (Los Angeles County) 91020; United States; 34°12′42″N 118°13′50″W

Information
- Type: Private, Coeducational, Classical
- Motto: Fides ∙ Ratio ∙ Virtus (Faith ∙ Reason ∙ Virtue)
- Religious affiliation: Roman Catholic
- Patron saint: St. Monica
- Established: September, 2001
- Headmaster: Peter Halpin
- Teaching staff: 33
- Grades: 1-12
- Student to teacher ratio: 12 students per teacher
- Colors: Navy Blue and Green
- Sports: Baseball, Basketball (Men and Women), Volleyball (Women), Cross Country (Men and Women), Swimming (Men and Women), Golf
- Mascot: The Crusader
- Accreditation: Western Association of Schools and Colleges
- Retired Numbers: 55
- President of Board of Directors: Peter Grimm
- Website: www.stmonicaacademy.com

St. Monica Academy is a private, independent Roman Catholic high school in Montrose, California. It is operated independently of the Roman Catholic Archdiocese of Los Angeles.

== Background ==
St. Monica Academy, a classical Catholic school in the Los Angeles area for grades 1–12, was established in 2001 by lay parents. While not under the direct authority of the Los Angeles Archdiocese, the academy does have Archdiocesan approval similar to other private, Catholic schools in the area. St. Monica Academy is accredited by WASC and WCEA.

In 2012, St. Monica Academy's high school was named to the Cardinal Newman Society's Catholic High School Honor Roll, making it one of the Top 50 Catholic high schools in the United States. In 2013, it achieved the highest mean SAT scores of any Catholic high school in the Los Angeles Archdiocese, on all three sections of the SAT. In 2014, it was recognized by the Cardinal Newman Society as a national School of Excellence. In 2018, it was again awarded a place in said Society's Catholic Education Honor Roll, and is currently one of only 73 Newman Guide Recommended elementary and secondary schools in the United States.

From 2001 until 2015, St. Monica Academy was the tenant of Neighborhood Unitarian Church in Pasadena, CA. Following the 2015 academic year, the school relocated to the campus of the former parochial school at Holy Redeemer Catholic Church in Montrose, CA. St. Monica Academy celebrated its 25th anniversary during the 2025-2026 school year.
