= Eurotel World Chess Trophy =

2002 chess tournament in Prague

EuroTel World Chess Trophy
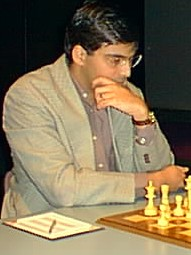
- Viswanathan Anand

Tournament information
- Sport: Chess
- Location: Prague, Czech Republic
- Dates: 28 April 2002–6 May 2002
- Administrator: Online Chess World
- Format: Rapid, Classical
- Tournament format: Single-elimination
- Participants: 32
- Purse: €500,000

Final positions
- Champion: (India) Viswanathan Anand
- Runner-up: (Russia) Anatoly Karpov

The Eurotel World Chess Trophy was a 32-player single-elimination chess tournament hosted in Prague, Czech Republic from 27 April to 5 May 2002. Presented under the auspices of Online World Chess, 14 of the world's top 15 players were in attendance, including the reigning world champion Vladimir Kramnik and the world's No. 1-ranked player Garry Kasparov. At stake was a share of the €500,000 prize fund and the EuroTel Trophy. The finalists of the tournament were determined by a series of knockout matches played at rapid time controls, but the finals alone were played at a classical time control. Indian grandmaster Vishwanathan Anand won the tournament, defeating Anatoly Karpov 1½–½ in the finals.

== Details ==
=== Format ===
Except for the finals, each knockout match was best-of-two games, with both games played at a rapid time control of 25 minutes + 5 seconds per move. In the case of a 1–1 tie, a two-game blitz match would be played. If still tied, the match would come down to armageddon. The finals was also a best-of-two games, but was played at a classical time control of 40 moves in 2 hours, followed an additional hour for 20 more moves, and 30 minutes for the rest of the game.

=== Participants ===
1. Garry Kasparov (RUS), 2838
2. Vladimir Kramnik (RUS), 2809
3. Viswanathan Anand (IND), 2752
4. Veselin Topalov (BUL), 2745
5. Michael Adams (ENG), 2744
6. Evgeny Bareev (RUS), 2724
7. Alexander Morozevich (RUS), 2718
8. Vasyl Ivanchuk (UKR), 2711
9. Boris Gelfand (ISR), 2710
10. Peter Leko (HUN), 2707
11. Alexei Shirov (ESP), 2704
12. Alexander Grischuk (RUS), 2702
13. Alexander Khalifman (RUS), 2698
14. Anatoly Karpov (RUS), 2690
15. Peter Svidler (RUS), 2688
16. Judit Polgar (HUN), 2677
17. Ye Jiangchuan (CHN), 2676
18. Nigel Short (ENG), 2673
19. Jeroen Piket (NED), 2659
20. Viktor Bologan (MDA), 2652
21. Ivan Sokolov (BIH), 2647
22. Loek van Wely (NED), 2642
23. Mikhail Gurevich (BEL), 2641
24. Vladislav Tkachiev (FRA), 2633
25. Yasser Seirawan (USA), 2631
26. Sergei Movsesian (CZE), 2624
27. Artur Jussupow (GER), 2618
28. Jan Timman (NED), 2616
29. Teimour Radjabov (AZE), 2610
30. Vadim Milov (SUI), 2606
31. Zbyněk Hráček (CZE), 2596
32. Gilberto Milos (BRA), 2594

=== Schedule ===
Date	Day	Round	Time
28 Apr	Sunday	Round 1	14:00
29 Apr	Monday	Round 1	14:00
30 Apr	Tuesday	Round 2	14:00
1 May	Wednesday	Quarterfinals	14:00
2 May	Thursday	Semifinals	14:00
5 May	Sunday	Finals	12:30
6 May	Monday	Finals	12:30

== Results ==
The surprise of the tournament was Anatoly Karpov, who put together an impressive run with wins against Short, Kramnik, Morozevich, and Shirov to reach the finals. In the other half of the bracket, the No. 1 seed Kasparov was upset by Vasyl Ivanchuk in a sudden-death game after the rapid and blitz games did not produce a winner; Ivanchuk would subsequently lose to Indian grandmaster Viswanathan Anand in the semifinals, bowing out with a loss in the second blitz tiebreak game after both rapid games ended in a draw.

Quarterfinals
(Russia) Garry Kasparov	2
(Ukraine) Vasyl Ivanchuk	3
(India) Viswanathan Anand	1½
(Netherlands) Ivan Sokolov	½
(Russia) Anatoly Karpov	1½
(Russia) Alexander Morozevich	½
(Bulgaria) Veselin Topalov	½
(Spain) Alexei Shirov	1½

Semifinals
(Ukraine) Vasyl Ivanchuk	1½
(India) Viswanathan Anand	2½
(Russia) Anatoly Karpov	3
(Spain) Alexei Shirov	1

Final
(India) Viswanathan Anand	1½
(Russia) Anatoly Karpov	½

In the final, Anand defeated Karpov in Game 1 with White to take a 1–0 lead; Anand maneuvered his light-squared bishop to slowly gain an advantage throughout the game, before 54... a5? gave the Indian a winning advantage. In Game 2, Karpov pressed but was unable to crack Anand's Semi-Slav Defense, leading to a 34-move draw.

2002 EuroTel Knockout Tournament – Final
Name	Rating	1	2	Total
Viswanathan Anand (IND)	2752	1	½	1½
Anatoly Karpov (RUS)	2690	0	½	½
