= Classics II =

Classics II or Classics 2 may refer to:

- Classics II (Era album), a 2010 album by French musical project Era
- Classics II (George Canyon album), a 2012 album by Canadian singer George Canyon
- Classics Volume Two, an 2015 album by American music group Two Steps from Hell

== See also ==
- Classics (disambiguation)
- Classics: Vol 1 (disambiguation)
