= Classics: Vol 1 =

Classics: Vol 1, Classics Volume One and similar titles may refer to

- Classics: Vol 1, an album by Big Moe
- Classics Volume 1, a compilation album of songs by Herb Alpert
- Classics Volume One, a 2013 album by Two Steps From Hell

== See also ==
- Classics (disambiguation)
- Classics II (disambiguation)
