= Fall Classic (disambiguation) =

Fall Classic often refers to the championship series of Major League Baseball, the World Series.

Fall Classic may also refer to one of the following annual sporting events:

== Curling ==
- Crestwood Ladies Fall Classic, a defunct bonspiel in Alberta, Canada
- Direct Horizontal Drilling Fall Classic, a defunct bonspiel in Alberta, Canada
- KW Fall Classic, a bonspiel in Ontario, Canada
- Oakville Fall Classic, a bonspiel in Ontario, Canada

== Other uses ==
- Fall Classic 200, a former name of a stock car race in Indiana, U.S.
- Fall Classic at Arrowhead, an alternate name of the Northwest Missouri State−Pittsburg State college football rivalry
- Straight Down Fall Classic, a golf tournament in California, U.S.

== See also ==
- Spring Classic
- Summer Classic
- Winter Classic
