= Classic (disambiguation) =

A classic is something that is a perfect example of a particular style, something of lasting worth or with a timeless quality.

Classic or The Classic may also refer to:

== Common uses ==
- Classics, study of culture of Ancient Greece and Ancient Rome

== Literature ==
- Classic book
- Classic (novel), a novel in the It Girl series

== Film ==
- Classic (1998 film), a Russian film
- The Classic (2001 film), a Finnish film
- The Classic (2003 film), a South Korean film
- Classic (2016 film), a Nepali film

== Music ==
- Classical period

=== Albums ===
- Classic (Eric B. & Rakim album)
- The Classic (Joan as Police Woman album)
- Classic (Joe McElderry album), 2011
- Classic (Living Legends album), 2005
- Classic (Rah Digga album)
- The Classic (Shinhwa album)
- Classic (Terri Clark album), 2012
- Classic (Bryan Adams album), 2022

=== Extended plays ===
- Classic by Robyn Ottolini, 2020

=== Songs ===
- "Classic" (Adrian Gurvitz song), 1982
- "Classic" (The Knocks song), 2014
- "Classic" (MKTO song), 2013
- "Classic (Better Than I've Ever Been)", by Rakim, Kanye West, Nas, and KRS-One, 2007
- "Classic", by Dallas Smith, 2020
- "Classic", by Hieroglyphics from Full Circle, 2003

== Sports ==
=== Association football ===
- Several football rivalries that are translations of the word "classic", or include translations in their names

=== Golf ===
- Air Capital Classic
- AT&T Champions Classic
- Atlanta Classic
- Bob Hope Classic
- Byron Nelson Classic
- Chile Classic
- CIMB Classic
- Colombian Classic
- Dubai Desert Classic
- Greenbrier Classic
- Heritage Classic (PGA Tour), now the RBC Heritage
- Heritage Classic (PGA Tour of Australasia)
- Honda Classic
- John Deere Classic
- Kia Classic
- Lexus Panama Classic
- Marathon Classic
- McGladrey Classic
- Meijer LPGA Classic
- OHL Classic at Mayakoba
- Pennsylvania Classic
- Personal Classic
- Portland Classic
- ShopRite LPGA Classic
- Southern Farm Bureau Classic
- St. Jude Classic
- Stonebrae Classic
- Thornberry Creek LPGA Classic
- Toto Japan Classic
- True Thailand Classic
- Volunteers of America LPGA North Dallas Classic
- Walt Disney World Golf Classic
- Zurich Classic of New Orleans

=== Tennis ===
- Birmingham Classic (tennis)
- Stanford Classic
- Thunderbird Classic (tennis)

=== Other sports ===
- Classic (snooker), a professional snooker tournament, 1980–1992
- Fall Classic, colloquial term for the World Series in Major League Baseball
- World Baseball Classic, major senior national championship of baseball

== Other uses ==
- Classic 22, a Canadian sailboat design
- Classic (transit bus), a bus developed by GM
- Classic (cigarette), Indian cigarette brand
- BlackBerry Classic, a smartphone by BlackBerry Limited
- Classic Environment, the OS X environment for running pre-OS X Mac applications
- The Classic (newspaper), the school newspaper of Townsend Harris High School
- The Classic, South African literary journal founded in 1963 by Nat Nakasa

== See also ==
- Classical (disambiguation)
- Classics (disambiguation)
- El Clásico (disambiguation)
