= Townsend Harris High School =

Public school in New York City

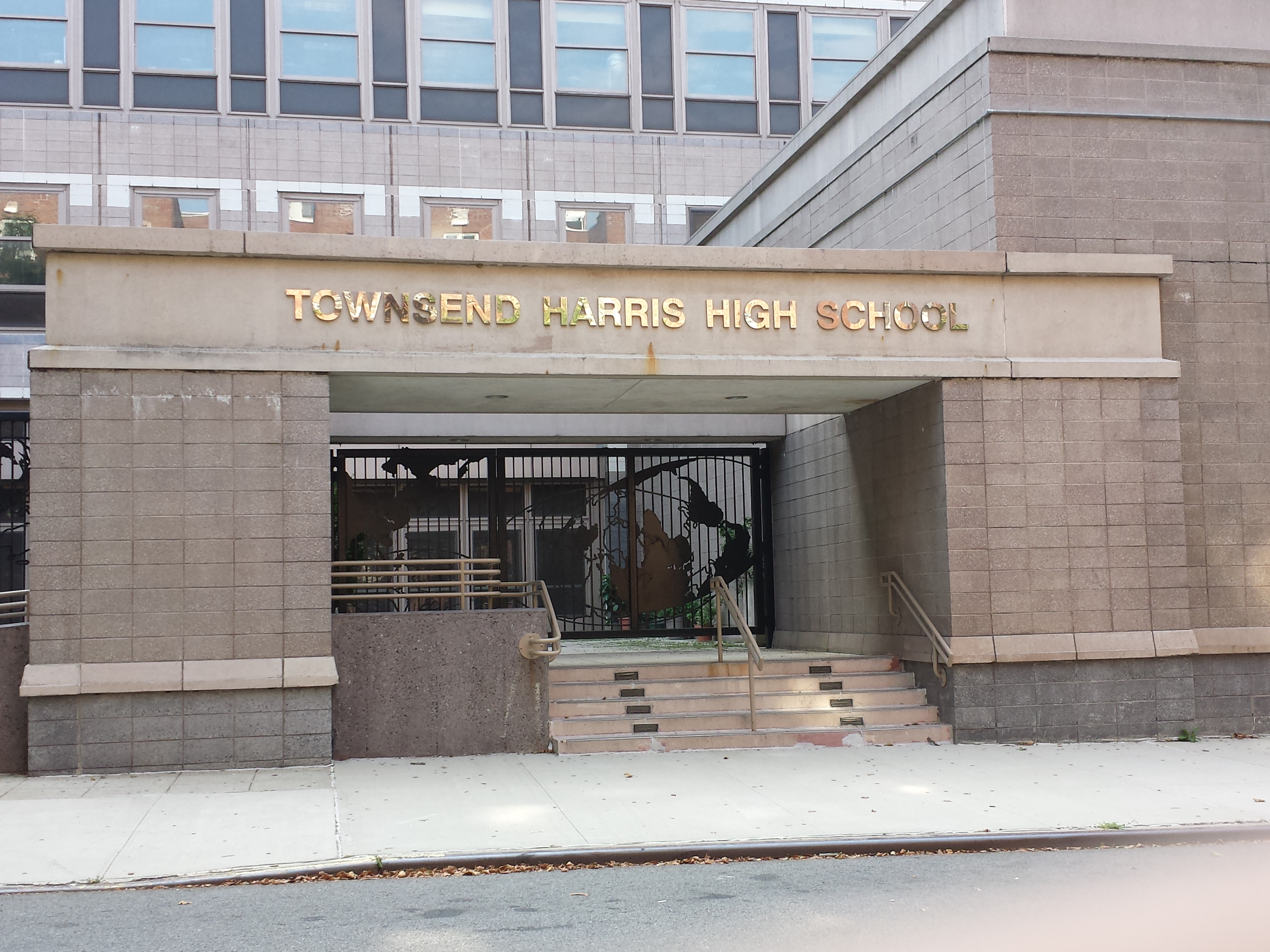
- Entrance on 149th Street

Location
- 149-11 Melbourne Ave; Flushing, Queens, New York 11367; United States; 40.735°N 73.8215°W

Information
- Type: Public
- Established: 1984 (predecessor founded 1904)
- School district: New York City Department of Education
- NCES School ID: 360012204485
- Principal: Brian Condon
- Teaching staff: 90.47 (on an FTE basis)
- Grades: 9-12
- Enrollment: 1,323 (2022-2023)
- Student to teacher ratio: 14.61
- Colors: Crimson and gold
- Mascot: Hawks
- Newspaper: The Classic
- Yearbook: The Crimson and Gold
- Website: www.thhs.qc.edu

Townsend Harris High School (THHS; often also shortened to Townsend Harris or simply Townsend) is a public high school for the humanities in the New York City borough of Queens. It is located on the campus of Queens College, a public college part of the City University of New York system. The school was named in honor of Townsend Harris, the 19th-century merchant, politician, founder of City College, and diplomat who served as the first American Consul to Japan.

== History ==
Townsend Harris High School was founded in 1984 by alumni of Townsend Harris Hall Prep School, who desired to reopen their school that was closed in the 1940s. This process started in 1980.

The first principal was Malcolm Largmann, a former high school English teacher with a strong belief in a classical education who also handpicked the school's original faculty. Largmann served as principal of Townsend Harris from 1984 until his retirement in 2001. Largmann died in 2021. The new school began in a small building on Parsons Boulevard, originally intended as a temporary home until a permanent facility could be realized. In early 1995, the school moved into a new building located on the campus of Queens College.

Brian Condon became principal after a heated debate concerning interim Principal Rosemarie Jahoda, which was covered extensively by student reporters from The Classic.

== Enrollment ==
Admission is available to all New York City residents in the 8th grade. Prior to the COVID-19 pandemic, a minimum grade point average of 91 was required of all applicants to be considered for admission, as well as standardized reading and math scores at a minimum of the 90th percentile (4.3 on both English and Math). Post-pandemic, beginning in 2022, students are grouped in tiers based on their final 7th grade core subjects (ELA, Social Studies, Math and Science) averages, with Tier 1, an average greater than 94, having priority for admissions. A short video and a humanities/science essay are also required as part of the application process. As of 2004, AP World History became a mandatory subject and replaced the Regents-level course.

== Academics ==
In addition to the standard three-year Regents English program, all students take a "fifth year" of English as freshmen in the form of a "Writing Process" composition course. In addition to the standard modern language requirement which may be fulfilled with classes in Spanish, French, or Japanese, students must meet a two-year classical language requirement which can be fulfilled by classes in Latin or classical Greek. There is also a rigorous physical education requirement, especially in freshman year, and a senior project required of students. A variety of electives and AP classes are also offered to students.

In the 2022-23 school year, Townsend Harris offered the following Advanced Placement (AP) classes: Computer Science A, Computer Science Principles, English Language and Composition, English Literature and Composition, Art History, Calculus AB & BC, Statistics, Capstone, Biology, Chemistry, Environmental Science, Physics 1, French Language and Culture, Japanese Language and Culture, Spanish Language and Culture, Spanish Literature and Culture, Macroeconomics, Psychology, United States Government and Politics, United States History, and World History: Modern.

== Extracurriculars ==
Townsend Harris High School offers a wide range of extracurricular activities spanning the humanities, cultural societies, STEM, pre-professional clubs, and community service organizations. These student-led groups are typically organized with faculty advisors and provide opportunities for students to engage in academic interests, cultural exchange, leadership, and volunteer work outside the classroom.

Two of the school’s most prominent annual extracurricular traditions are SING! and the Festival of Nations (FON). SING! is a student theater competition in which students are divided into two teams: Freshiors (freshmen and juniors) and Semores (sophomores and seniors). Each team produces an original musical performance built around a central theme, such as escapism or historical adventures, incorporating acting, choreography, set design, and music.

The Festival of Nations (FON) is a cultural performance that highlights the diversity of the school’s student body. Students organize and perform dances representing different cultural traditions, with the event serving as a celebration of the various cultural backgrounds represented within the school community.

== Student body ==
Townsend Harris was originally an all-boys school, but is now open to all.

As of 2023, the school's population is largely Asian; the 2022–23 school survey showed Asians making up 57% of the student body total, comprising the largest segment of the school's population. White students comprise 16% of the population, Hispanic students 16% and black students 6%.

As of 2024, 60% of students at Townsend Harris are from an economically disadvantaged background.

The school has a 99% graduation rate.

Scores on standardized examinations are also high when compared to other public high schools; in the year 2005–2006, Harrisites had average scores of 628 and 632 on the SAT verbal and math sections, respectively, compared to 551 and 565 for what the city deems "similar schools" and 444 and 467 for students citywide.

== Accomplishments ==
- The Blue Ribbon Schools of Excellence Foundation named THHS a 21st Century School of Distinction in June 2004. In December of that year, the school was named a Lighthouse School by the same organization.
- In 2005 and 2006, the school had the highest percentage of students passing Regents exams of any New York City Department of Education high school.
- THHS was awarded with the 2006-2007 Highest Percentage Passing AP World History Scores in the US for a Large School.
- In 2008, Intel awarded THHS with the Intel Schools of Distinction Award in Science Excellence. It was one of three schools, one elementary, middle, and high school, to be awarded such, and one of six to be awarded at all. The schools were each awarded "a $10,000 cash grant from the Intel Foundation and an award package that includes curriculum materials, professional development resources, hardware and software valued at more than $160,000."
- As of 2024, THHS has been awarded with the First Amendment Press Freedom Award six times. Its last of these awards was in 2014. The award celebrates freedom of speech in student publications, in this case, Townsend's The Classic.

== Notable alumni ==
=== Writing and journalism ===
- Neil Drumming, journalist, writer, and director of the film Big Words (2013), and podcast producer for This American Life, Serial, and The New York Times
- Michael Weiss, journalist; contributing editor at New Lines magazine and senior correspondent for Yahoo News

=== Performing arts and entertainment ===
- Sam Jaffe (1908), actor
- Hari Kondabolu, stand-up comic

=== Business, economics, and philanthropy ===
- Divya Narendra, co-founder of SumZero and the now-defunct ConnectU (originally HarvardConnection)

=== Psychology ===
- Solomon Asch (1924), City College alumnus who went on to become a leading figure in social psychology.

=== Law, politics, and activism ===
- Nily Rozic, politician and assemblywoman for New York's 25th State Assembly district
