= Superclasico (disambiguation) =

The Superclásico is any match between the Buenos Aires soccer clubs Boca Juniors and River Plate.

Superclasico, Super Clasico or Superclassico may also refer to:

== Sports ==
- El Súper Clásico (Mexico), matches between the Mexican soccer clubs Club América and Guadalajara
- SuperClasico, matches between the Los Angeles soccer clubs LA Galaxy and Chivas USA
- Superclassic of the Americas, the soccer rivalry between the national teams of Argentina and Brazil
  - Superclásico de las Américas or Superclássico das Américas, a former annual soccer match between Argentina and Brazil
- Superclásico de Quito, matches between the Quito soccer clubs S. D. Aucas and LDU Quito
- Chilean Superclásico, matches between the Chilean soccer clubs Colo-Colo and Universidad de Chile
- Colombian Superclásico, matches between the Colombian soccer clubs Atlético Nacional and Millonarios F.C.
- Honduran Superclásico, matches between the Tegucigalpa soccer clubs F.C. Motagua and C.D. Olimpia
- Indonesian Superclásico, matches between the Indonesian soccer clubs Persija Jakarta and Persib Bandung
- Paraguayan Superclásico, matches between the Asunción soccer clubs Club Cerro Porteño and Club Olimpia
- Peruvian Superclásico, matches between the Lima soccer clubs Alianza Lima and Universitario
- 2018 Superclásico Championship, a four-way international soccer tournament between Saudi Arabia, Iraq, Argentina and Brazil

== Other uses ==
- SuperClásico, a 2011 Danish romantic comedy film
- "Superclassico", a 2020 song by Italian rapper Ernia

== See also ==
- El Clásico (disambiguation)
