= 2013 Denham Hospitality Summer Classic =

- Host city: Leduc, Alberta
- Arena: Leduc Curling Club
- Dates: September 6–8
- Men's winner: (China) Liu Rui
- Curling club: Harbin CC, Harbin
- Skip: Liu Rui
- Third: Zang Jialiang
- Second: Xu Xiaoming
- Lead: Ba Dexin
- Finalist: (British Columbia) Daylan Vavrek
- Women's winner: (China) Wang Bingyu
- Curling club: Harbin CC, Harbin
- Skip: Wang Bingyu
- Third: Liu Yin
- Second: Yue Qingshuang
- Lead: Zhou Yan
- Finalist: (Alberta) Valerie Sweeting

The 2013 Denham Hospitality Summer Classic was held from September 6 to 8 at the Leduc Curling Club in Leduc, Alberta as part of the 2013–14 World Curling Tour. Both the men's and women's events were held in a round robin format. The purse for both the men's and the women's events were CAD$9,100 each.

== Men ==
=== Teams ===
The teams are listed as follows:

| Skip | Third | Second | Lead | Locale |
|---|---|---|---|---|
| Kim Soo-hyuk | Kim Tae-huan | Park Jong-duk | Nam Yoon-ho | South Korea |
| Liu Rui | Zang Jialiang | Xu Xiaoming | Ba Dexin | Harbin, China |
| Kenton Maschmeyer | Ben Bellamy | Brayden Power | Brayden Oswald | Edmonton, Alberta |
| Chris Lemishka (fourth) | Dean Ross (skip) | Tyler Pfeiffer | Neal Woloschuk | Edmonton, Alberta |
| Michael Roy | Karsten Sturmay | Jordan MacKenzie | Mac Lenton | Airdrie, Alberta |
| Tom Sallows | Jordan Steinke | Matthew Brown | Kendell Warawa | Edmonton, Alberta |
| Robert Schlender | Aaron Sluchinski | Justin Sluchinski | Dylan Webster | Airdrie, Alberta |
| Danny Sherrard | Kyle Reynolds | Scott McClements | Todd Kaasten | Edmonton, Alberta |
| Daylan Vavrek | Jason Ginter | Tristan Steinke | Brett Winfield | Dawson Creek, British Columbia |
| Morgan van Doesburg | Clint Hoffart | Deryk Kuny | Blake Weslosky | Leduc, Alberta |

=== Knockout results ===
The draw is listed as follows:

==== A event ====
First Knockout
(Alberta) Morgan van Doesburg | 1
(British Columbia) Daylan Vavrek | 8
(Alberta) Kenton Maschmeyer | 6
(Alberta) Danny Sherrard | 8

Quarterfinals
(British Columbia) Daylan Vavrek | 6
(Alberta) Robert Schlender | 4
(Alberta) Tom Sallows | w/o
(South Korea) Kim Soo-hyuk
(Alberta) Danny Sherrard | 6
(China) Liu Rui | 8
(Alberta) Dean Ross | 7
(Alberta) Michael Roy | 6

Semifinals
(British Columbia) Daylan Vavrek | 7
(Alberta) Tom Sallows | 6
(China) Liu Rui | 5
(Alberta) Dean Ross | 7

Qualifier 1
(British Columbia) Daylan Vavrek | 5
(Alberta) Dean Ross | 4

==== B event ====
Second Knockout
(Alberta) Michael Roy | 5
(Alberta) Kenton Maschmeyer | 1

Semifinals
(Alberta) Michael Roy | 6
(Alberta) Tom Sallows | 7
(Alberta) Robert Schlender | 2
(China) Liu Rui | 8

Qualifier 2
(Alberta) Tom Sallows | 4
(China) Liu Rui | 6

| Second Knockout | | Semifinals | | Qualifier 3 |
| (South Korea) Kim Soo-hyuk |
| (Alberta) Morgan van Doesburg | w/o | (Alberta) Morgan van Doesburg | 1 |
| | | (Alberta) Danny Sherrard | 8 |
| | | | | (Alberta) Danny Sherrard | 6 |
| | | | | (Alberta) Dean Ross | 0 |

==== C event ====
| Third Knockout | | Qualifier 4 |
| (Alberta) Michael Roy | 1 |
| (Alberta) Robert Schlender | 7 | (Alberta) Robert Schlender | 5 |
| | | (Alberta) Tom Sallows | 3 |

| Third Knockout | | Semifinals | | Qualifier 5 |
| (South Korea) Kim Soo-hyuk |
| (Alberta) Kenton Maschmeyer | w/o | (Alberta) Kenton Maschmeyer | 6 |
| | | (Alberta) Morgan van Doesburg | 5 |
| | | | | (Alberta) Kenton Maschmeyer | 3 |
| | | | | (Alberta) Dean Ross | 9 |

=== Playoffs ===
The playoffs draw is listed as follows:

Quarterfinals
(Alberta) Robert Schlender | 5
(Alberta) Dean Ross | 0

Semifinals
(Alberta) Robert Schlender | 5
(British Columbia) Daylan Vavrek | 6
(China) Liu Rui | 9
(Alberta) Danny Sherrard | 5

Final
(British Columbia) Daylan Vavrek | 1
(China) Liu Rui | 6

== Women ==
The teams are listed as follows:

=== Teams ===
| Skip | Third | Second | Lead | Locale |
|---|---|---|---|---|
| Laura Crocker | Erin Carmody | Rebecca Pattinson | Jen Gates | Edmonton, Alberta |
| Delia DeJong | Amy Janko | Brittany Whittemore | Stephanie Yanishewski | Grande Prairie, Alberta |
| Lisa Eyamie | Desirée Owen | Jodi Marthaller | Stephanie Malekoff | Grande Prairie, Alberta |
| Jiang Yilun | Wang Rui | Yaoi Mingyue | She Qiutong | Harbin, China |
| Jessie Kaufman | Tiffany Steuber | Dayna Demmans | Stephanie Enright | Spruce Grove, Alberta |
| Nicky Kaufman | Pam Appelman | Brittany Zelmer | Jennifer Sheehan | Edmonton, Alberta |
| Patti Knezevic | Jen Rusnell | Kristen Fewster | Rhonda Camozzi | Prince George, British Columbia |
| Chana Martineau | Candace Reid | Kara Lindholm | Kandace Lindholm | Edmonton, Alberta |
| Leslie Rogers | Kathleen Dunbar | Jenilee Goertzen | Kelsey Latawiec | Edmonton, Alberta |
| Valerie Sweeting | Dana Ferguson | Joanne Taylor | Rachelle Pidherny | Edmonton, Alberta |
| Wang Bingyu | Liu Yin | Yue Qingshuang | Zhou Yan | Harbin, China |
| Holly Whyte | Heather Steele | Deena Benoit | Karynn Flory | Grande Prairie, Alberta |

=== Knockout results ===
The draw is listed as follows:

==== A event ====
First Knockout
(China) Jiang Yilun | 8
(Alberta) Nicky Kaufman | 7
(Alberta) Lisa Eyamie | 3
(Alberta) Delia DeJong | 8

Semifinals
(China) Jiang Yilun | 5
(Alberta) Laura Crocker | 4
(Alberta) Delia DeJong | 8
(Alberta) Chana Martineau | 5

Qualifier 1
(China) Jiang Yilun | 8
(Alberta) Delia DeJong | 2

First Knockout
(Alberta) Jessie Kaufman | 5
(Alberta) Holly Whyte | 7
(British Columbia) Patti Knezevic | 2
(Alberta) Leslie Rogers | 8

Semifinals
(Alberta) Holly Whyte | 3
(Alberta) Valerie Sweeting | 4
(Alberta) Leslie Rogers | 5
(China) Wang Bingyu | 4

Qualifier 2
(Alberta) Valerie Sweeting | 6
(Alberta) Leslie Rogers | 2

==== B event ====
| Second Knockout | | Semifinals | | Qualifier 3 |
| (Alberta) Chana Martineau | 2 |
| (Alberta) Nicky Kaufman | 6 | (Alberta) Nicky Kaufman | 4 |
| (Alberta) Laura Crocker | 3 | (Alberta) Lisa Eyamie | 6 |
| (Alberta) Lisa Eyamie | 4 | | | (Alberta) Lisa Eyamie | 3 |
| | | | | (Alberta) Leslie Rogers | 6 |

| Second Knockout | | Semifinals | | Qualifier 4 |
| (China) Wang Bingyu | 8 |
| (Alberta) Jessie Kaufman | 4 | (China) Wang Bingyu | 8 |
| (Alberta) Holly Whyte | 3 | (British Columbia) Patti Knezevic | 2 |
| (British Columbia) Patti Knezevic | 7 | | | (China) Wang Bingyu | 7 |
| | | | | (Alberta) Delia DeJong | 0 |

==== C event ====
| Second Knockout | | Semifinals | | Qualifier 3 |
| | | | | (Alberta) Lisa Eyamie | 8 |
| | | | | (Alberta) Laura Crocker | 4 |
| | | (British Columbia) Patti Knezevic | 2 |
| (Alberta) Chana Martineau | 2 | (Alberta) Laura Crocker | 8 |
| (Alberta) Laura Crocker | 5 |

| Third Knockout | | Semifinals | | Qualifier 5 |
| | | | | (Alberta) Delia DeJong | 7 |
| | | | | (Alberta) Nicky Kaufman | 5 |
| | | (Alberta) Nicky Kaufman | 8 |
| (Alberta) Jessie Kaufman | 5 | (Alberta) Holly Whyte | 2 |
| (Alberta) Holly Whyte | 6 |

=== Playoffs ===
The playoffs draw is listed as follows:

Quarterfinals
(Alberta) Lisa Eyamie | 4
(China) Wang Bingyu | 7
(Alberta) Delia DeJong | 7
(Alberta) Leslie Rogers | 2

Semifinals
(China) Jiang Yilun | 3
(China) Wang Bingyu | 7
(Alberta) Valerie Sweeting | 7
(Alberta) Delia DeJong | 4

Final
(China) Wang Bingyu | 9
(Alberta) Valerie Sweeting | 2
