= Snow Clasico =

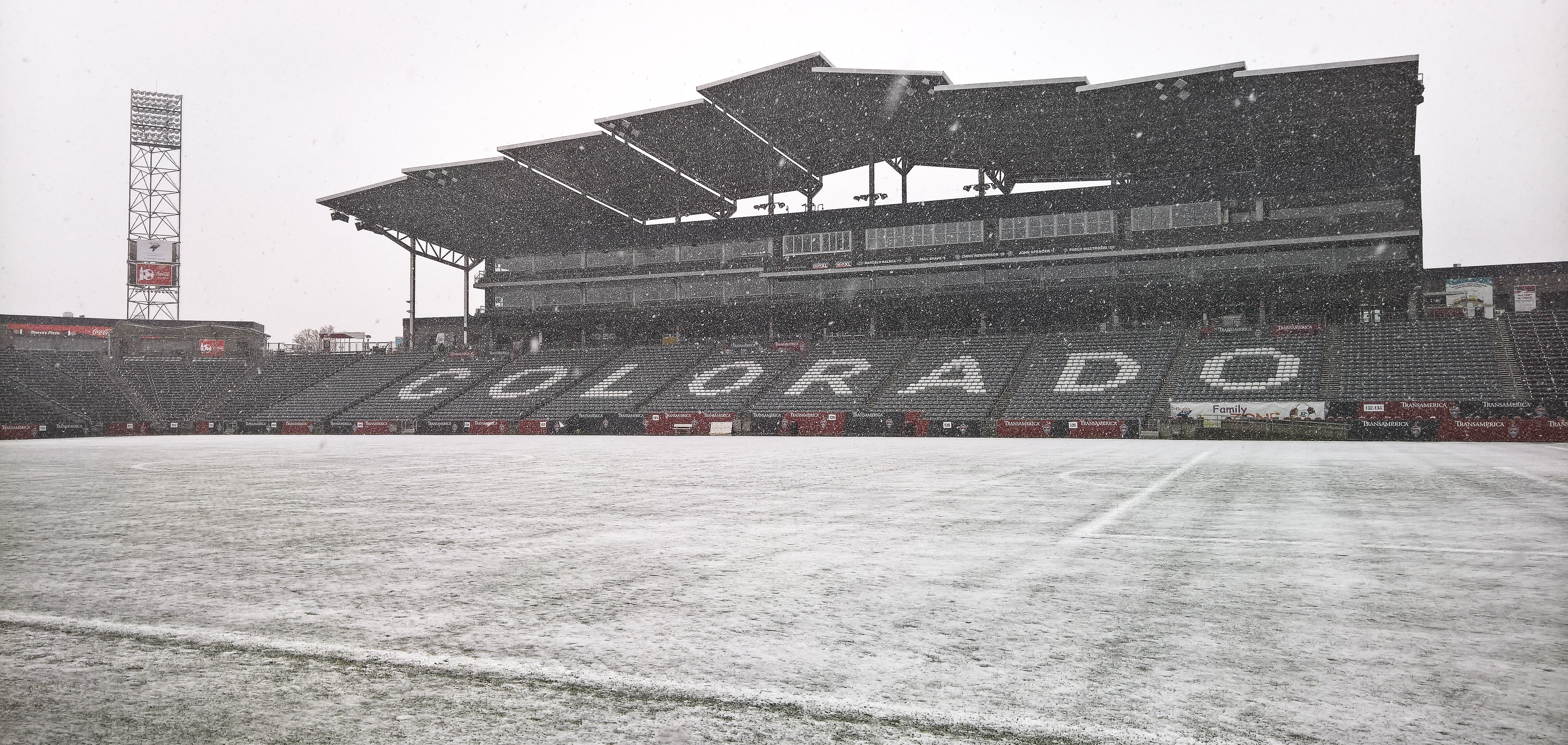
- The Dick's Sporting Goods Park hosted the match under similar conditions as in this picture
- Event: 2014 FIFA World Cup qualification match
United States	Costa Rica
1	0
- Date: 22 March 2013
- Venue: Dick's Sporting Goods Park, Commerce City, Colorado, United States
- Referee: Joel Aguilar (El Salvador)
- Attendance: 19,734
- Weather: Snowstorm; 28 °F (−2 °C)

The United States versus Costa Rica football (soccer) match was held on 22 March 2013 at the Dick's Sporting Goods Park in Commerce City, Colorado. It was part of the second matchday of the final qualification round in CONCACAF for the 2014 FIFA World Cup.

Both teams reached the match after not winning as visitors on the first matchday; the United States lost in San Pedro Sula against Honduras and Costa Rica reached a draw in Panama City against Panama.

Under heavy snowfall, the United States won the match with a lone goal by Clint Dempsey. The unusual conditions of the match sparked outrage in Costa Rica, whose football federation's formal complaint was rejected by FIFA; in contrast, US players and commentators point out that both teams had to play in the same conditions. Subsequent reactions from Costa Rican fans saw them turning their backs on FIFA's Fair Play anthem and flag during Costa Rica's following home match, as well as receiving the American players with hostility for their game in San José months later.

American media refers to the match as Snow Clasico, a name subsequently evoked by MLS matches played under similar conditions. In contrast, the match is considered by Costa Rican media as a watershed moment, as the following months saw their national team qualify to the 2014 World Cup with five consecutive victories at home—including a 3–1 victory against the United States seen as a revenge—and achieve their best performance at a FIFA World Cup by reaching the quarter-finals.

== Background ==
Both teams reached the match without victories in the Hexagonal, as the first matchday saw the United States lose 2–1 in Honduran soil and Costa Rica draw 2–2 as visitors against Panama.

This was the first FIFA World Cup qualification match between both teams since their 2–2 draw at Washington's Robert F. Kennedy Memorial Stadium, in the last matchday of the Hexagonal for the 2010 FIFA World Cup. In that game, a last minute equalizer by Jonathan Bornstein prevented Costa Rica from qualifying directly to the World Cup; instead, Honduras qualified, while Costa Rica was sent to an intercontinental play-off, which they lost against Uruguay. The United States Soccer Federation noted that "no goal resonated more in Costa Rica" than Bornstein's, who became "a national hero in Honduras." La Nación's Álvaro Murillo recounted the moments that led to the goal in a note titled "That damned corner [kick]".

Hours before the match in Colorado, another FIFA World Cup qualifier match in Europe between Northern Ireland and Russia, scheduled to be held at Windsor Park in Belfast, was suspended because of a heavy snowfall. The match was postponed to the next day, but because the conditions did not improve, it was postponed once more to be played in August.

About three hours before the match, La Nación's Juan José Herrera reported an increasing snowfall, and that despite forecasts of worsening conditions, the stadium authorities expressed that calling the match off was "very unlikely."

== The match ==
=== First half ===
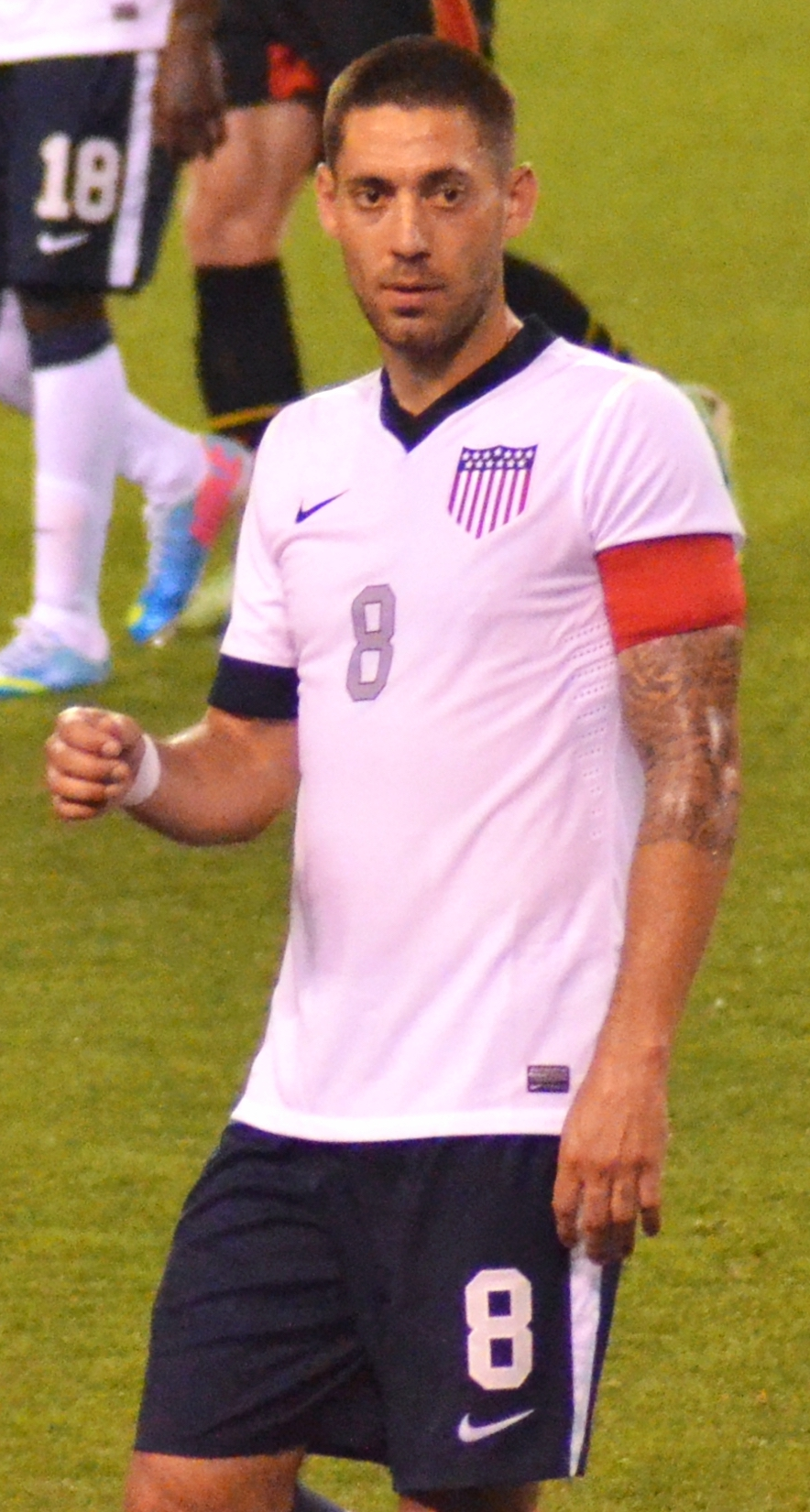
Clint Dempsey scored the winning goal

Sixteen minutes into the match, Clint Dempsey scored the winning goal, as he took advantage of a shot by Jozy Altidore that was deflected to Dempsey's position by Costa Rican defender Roy Miller. La Nación's Diego Ureña reported, at the end of the first half, that the field was threatening to the players' integrity, and that by the end of the 21st minute, after a missed chance by Costa Rican player Christian Bolaños, the game showed little actual football, highlighting the foul play and slips, which coincides with Jorge Luis Pinto's description that "football-wise, the match can only be evaluated from its earlier twenty or twenty-five minutes."

For Michael Bradley, the field during the first half "was still O.K. even though it was a little hard to see." La Nación's Ureña, once the match was finished, expressed that "the match actually lasted fifteen minutes and became a snowfight afterwards."

=== Second half ===
Conditions worsened heavily during the second half. Bradley described that "as the snow accumulated in the second half, it was almost impossible to play." Around the fifty-fourth minute, referee Joel Aguilar halted the match momentarily, and gathered captains Clint Dempsey and Bryan Ruiz to discuss a possible suspension of the match with FIFA commissioner Victor Daniel. The United States' coach Jurgen Klinsmann ran to the pitch as he angrily expressed, in a "bad Spanish", his desire for the match to continue.

Eventually, the match resumed, as some of the personnel of the stadium used plows and shovels to remove the snow off the field demarcations. While recounting the minute-by-minute action of the match, Costa Rican newspaper Al Día indicated that the game "is being played under unsportsmanlike conditions," that "the ball is rolling very slowly," and "the snowfall is getting stronger." Costa Rica had a goal disallowed on the 70th minute as Michael Umaña was caught offside, while the United States were denied a penalty after Clint Dempsey was tripped on the box.

=== Details ===
2014 FIFA World Cup qualification – CONCACAF fourth round – Second matchday
22 March 2013
20:11 (UTC-6)

United States	1–0	Costa Rica
Dempsey 16'	Report

Dick's Sporting Goods Park, Commerce City
Attendance: 19,734
Referee: Joel Aguilar (El Salvador)

United States	Costa Rica

GK	1	Brad Guzan
DF	3	Omar Gonzalez
DF	7	DaMarcus Beasley
DF	20	Geoff Cameron
DF	21	Clarence Goodson
MF	4	Michael Bradley
MF	13	Jermaine Jones	(substituted off) 81'
MF	19	Graham Zusi	(substituted off) 73'
FW	8	Clint Dempsey (c)
FW	9	Herculez Gomez	(substituted off) 90'
FW	17	Jozy Altidore
Substitutes:
GK	12	Nick Rimando
GK	22	Sean Johnson
DF	2	Tony Beltran
DF	14	Matt Besler
DF	15	Justin Morrow
MF	5	Kyle Beckerman	(substituted on) 90'
MF	6	Maurice Edu	(substituted on) 81'
MF	10	Joe Corona
MF	11	Brek Shea
MF	16	Sacha Kljestan
FW	18	Eddie Johnson	(substituted on) 73'
FW	23	Terrence Boyd
Manager:
(Germany) Jürgen Klinsmann

GK	1	Keylor Navas
DF	2	Cristian Gamboa		(substituted off) 79'
DF	3	Giancarlo González	(yellow card) 90'
DF	4	Michael Umaña
DF	8	Bryan Oviedo		(substituted off) 72'
DF	19	Roy Miller	(yellow card) 49'
MF	7	Christian Bolaños		(substituted off) 59'
MF	10	Bryan Ruiz (c)
MF	11	Michael Barrantes
MF	13	Ariel Rodríguez
FW	9	Álvaro Saborío
Substitutes:
GK	18	Patrick Pemberton
DF	6	Juan Diego Madrigal		(substituted on) 79'
DF	14	Christopher Meneses
DF	20	Kendall Waston
DF	21	Keilor Soto
MF	5	Celso Borges
MF	15	Osvaldo Rodríguez
MF	16	Diego Calvo		(substituted on) 72'
MF	17	Yeltsin Tejeda
FW	12	Joel Campbell		(substituted on) 59'
FW	22	Jairo Arrieta
Manager:
(Colombia) Jorge Luis Pinto

Assistant referees:
Juan Zumba (El Salvador)
William Torres (El Salvador)
Fourth official:
Marlon Mejía (El Salvador)

== Reactions ==
=== Professional ===
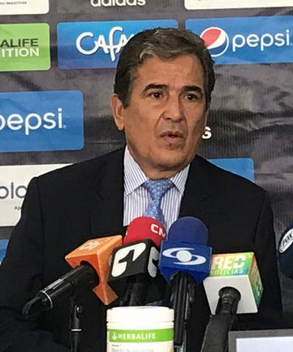
For Jorge Luis Pinto, the Snow Clasico was "an embarrassment" to the sport

Members of the Costa Rican team were enraged by the conditions of the match and the decision to let it continue. Coach Jorge Luis Pinto called the match "an embarrassment to soccer" and "an insult." He also stated that referee Joel Aguilar "should be suspended, because he allowed this woesome spectacle to happen, and both Costa Rica and the people who attended the match to be insulted." Midfielder Michael Barrantes said "You could not see the lines, you could not see the ball, this could not be played." Forward Álvaro Saborío stated that "we know that, under normal conditions, they would not have beaten us," while goalkeeper Keylor Navas expressed his sadness for the decision, reprimanding the referee for "doing nothing" to stop the match. Eduardo Li, president of the Costa Rican Football Federation, reported that "when the match was suspended, we [the federative members] were taken to a meeting with FIFA officials, and the match was resumed at that precise moment."

Costa Rican players took to social media, particularly Twitter, to express their discomfort with the match. Joel Campbell tweeted "regarding last night... Well, it is clear that we could not play this way;" he also tweeted another picture of the match while comparing it to the X Games. Celso Borges described the match conditions as "vulgar" and "unbelievable." In a milder tone, captain Bryan Ruiz tweeted "I never thought that something like this could happen during a World Cup qualification match," Bryan Oviedo expressed that "it hurts to lose three points this way, because I was sure we could have won with the team we have" and "I hope FIFA could do something against this kind of injustices."

In contrast, and given their win, the Americans took the match in a lighter tone. Defender Geoff Cameron expressed the conditions were "the same for both teams" and, regarding the Costa Ricans' outrage, he said "both teams are playing in it, so I'm not sure what their issue would be." Brad Guzan, DaMarcus Beasley, Jozy Altidore, and Herculez Gomez celebrated the victory and thanked the fans for their support, whereas Omar Gonzalez called the match "the craziest game I've ever played in my life!" It was also pointed out that Costa Rica had the opportunities to lodge a complaint with the officials during the game, including during the stoppage after halftime when both captains met with the referee and the coaches talked to him, but did not; the feeling was expressed that Costa Rica's complaints occurred only after the game because they had lost.

Jurgen Klinsmann, who defended the continuity of the match, expressed that "the match was equal for both teams and what the referee wanted by stopping the match was asking [the stadium personnel] to make the field lines visible, and those were cleared." He also said that "both teams would have liked to play on a big, green surface, but we had some fun anyway." Months later, he expressed that "We know that some people are angry because of the snow match, but it was not our fault. I did not ask God to send us snow." and that the United States would have won by more goals without snow.

=== Media ===
The match also caused an outrage in Costa Rican media. In his arbitration analysis for Teletica Canal 7, former referee Ramón Luis Méndez was heavily critical of Joel Aguilar's handling of the match, particularly in his decision to resume it, as well as allowing personnel of the stadium to invade the pitch during the course of the game. Méndez asserted that, while neither the American goal nor the disallowed Costa Rican goal could come into questioning, the match "violated every rule in football" as the snow impaired the visibility of the field. CRHoy's Laura Salas questioned the legitimacy of FIFA's Fair Play campaign, and replicated Méndez declarations that "if there had been rules, this match would have been suspended." She also questioned why the match was resumed given the postponement of the match between Northern Ireland and Russia earlier that day due to similar conditions.

Cristian Williams, for La República, praised the effort displayed by the players to find the equalizer, but pointed its futility as "it was impossible to generate any good football on that pitch, worthy of snowskating rather than football," and also criticized Jorge Luis Pinto because his idea for the game was "not losing, rather than winning."

Costa Rican president Laura Chinchilla expressed her discomfort with the match by tweeting "What a horror! They are demeaning this sport!" and "I feel pride for [the team's] effort, but shame for the match conditions."

After the match, former Costa Rican player Mauricio Montero was scathing against the Costa Rican Football Federation and their inability to do anything to stop the match, as he stated that "even a syndicate of snow cone vendors would be stronger than the FEDEFUTBOL."

== Aftermath ==
=== Following days ===
People removing the snow from Keylor Navas' goalkeeping area. This was one of the focal points of Costa Rica's protest letter

The Costa Rican Football Federation submitted a protest letter to FIFA, citing four points:

1. The physical integrity of the players was neglected.
2. The stadium personnel invaded the pitch during the course of the match.
3. The snow covered and concealed the pitch demarcations.
4. The ball could not roll properly because of the thick layer of snow.

FIFA confirmed the receipt of the letter, and informed that they would analyze the claims. FIFA released a statement in which they dismissed the Costa Rican complain given that "the conditions established in the regulations for an official appeal have not been met by the Costa Rica FA."

The match prompted Costa Rican fans to immediately sell out tickets for their encounter against Jamaica on 26 March, four days later. Moments before the match, Costa Rican fans in attendance turned their backs during the display of FIFA's Fair Play flag. Jamaican newspaper The Jamaica Star pointed that the fans were also booing and chanting "hijo de puta" (son of a bitch) during the Fair Play anthem, and also noted the usage of English signs as a way of insulting both FIFA and its president Sepp Blatter despite Costa Rica being a Spanish-speaking country. Costa Rica defeated Jamaica 2–0 with goals by Michael Umaña and Diego Calvo, a victory that Teletica referred to as "a thawing."

The United States' following match saw the team earning a point after a scoreless draw against Mexico at the Estadio Azteca.

=== Following months ===
One month after the snow match, Panamanian coach Julio Dely Valdés visited Seattle and its CenturyLink Field, venue of the World Cup qualification match between the United States and Panama played on 11 June, with the objective of ensuring that the logistics were adequate for his team; his motivation arising "because of everything that happened with Costa Rica in the case of the snow."

Costa Rica and the United States would face each other once again as part of a 2013 CONCACAF Gold Cup group stage match, which saw the Americans earn a new victory thanks to a goal by Brek Shea. La Nación's Randall Corella commented that "there was no revenge, but rather another blow to the heart" and that the loss "only pumps that feeling of wanting to defeat the Americans on September 6th." For the Americans, this match was part of a winning streak that began with a 4–3 triumph against Germany.

=== Match in Costa Rica ===
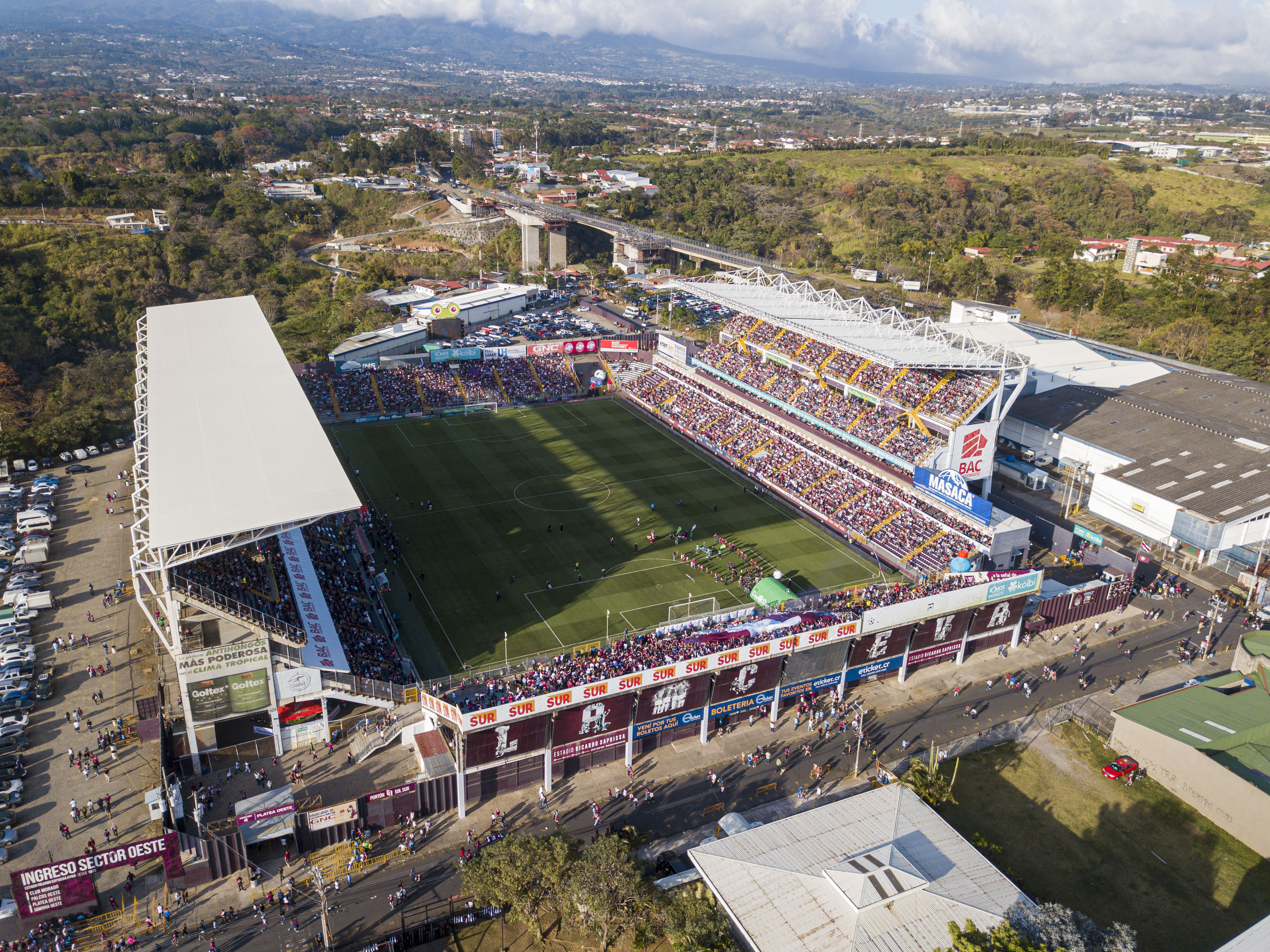
The Costa Rican Football Federation considered moving the match to the Estadio Ricardo Saprissa Aymá (top) because of its negative reputation among American players. They discarded the idea and kept the Estadio Nacional (bottom) as the venue

With a 12-match winning streak, that had them close to the world record set by Spain between 2008 and 2009, the United States' following match was a FIFA World Cup qualifier against Costa Rica in San José, a place where the Americans have never achieved a single victory. During the following months after the Snow Clásico, the Costa Rican Football Federation contemplated moving the match to the Estadio Ricardo Saprissa Aymá, given the stadium's bad reputation among American players for its hostile environment. In June, the federation discarded the option and kept the Estadio Nacional as the venue for the match.

CRHoy's Pablo Rojas noted the "desire of revenge" from fans on social media, with hashtags as #RevanchaCR.

Concerned over security issues, the American team reportedly asked for special measures upon arrival to Costa Rican soil. However, Costa Rican president Laura Chinchilla stated that the Americans would receive the same treatment they gave to the Costa Rican team, also asserting that "in the diplomatic language, this is called reciprocity," while members of her office reaffirmed that the United States team would not receive any special treatment. Upon arrival, the team was met with hostility by Costa Rican fans, who insulted the players and threw eggs to their bus, to which some players responded with obscene hand gestures. The Americans also complained of difficulties in finding a training ground. MLSSoccer informed that, the day before the match, Jurgen Klinsmann was interrupted during a post-training interview by a man in a cow suit (specifically as Lula, the mascot of Costa Rican dairy products company Dos Pinos) who was blowing a horn nearby.

Instants before the match, the fans who filled the Estadio Nacional to capacity booed the American anthem, for which FIFA imposed a fine of over $13,000 to the Costa Rican Football Federation. In contrast, the fans sang their national anthem with passion, and maintained a strong presence throughout the match, as Christian Bolaños expressed that "this is the match in which I have felt the fans the most involved."

The match saw an emotional stadium celebrate as Jhonny Acosta scored the first goal within two minutes, and Celso Borges netted the second goal seven minutes later, as Costa Rica was winning 2–0 before the 10th minute. Impressed by the start, David Faitelson tweeted "Costa Rica keep sending clear and overwhelming messages that they want to be at Brazil 2014." On the 40th minute, Keylor Navas would concede a penalty to the United States after fouling Clint Dempsey, who then scored the penalty to reduce the Costa Rican advantage to 2–1 by the end of the first half. During the second half, the Americans looked relentlessly for the equalizer, with Dempsey hitting the post at the 56th minute. However, their attempts did not come to fruition as Joel Campbell took advantage of a clearance by José Miguel Cubero to score the definitive 3–1 after outrunning Matt Besler.

Moments after scoring, another incident between Campbell and Besler occurred, as Campbell fell behind Besler. Referee Marco Antonio Rodríguez did not see the action, and after relying on one of his assistants, he booked a yellow card to Besler, rendering him unable to play the next qualifying match against Mexico due to accumulation of yellow cards. The United States Soccer Federation sent a video to FIFA, who reprimanded Campbell for his dive.

The match ended the United States' 12-game winning streak, while Costa Rica became leaders of the Hexagonal. This leadership, however, would only last four days as Costa Rica would get a 1–1 draw in Jamaica, while the United States would regain the first place after a "Dos a Cero" (2–0) victory over Mexico in Columbus. Some minutes after their respective matches ended, both Americans and Costa Ricans would qualify to the 2014 FIFA World Cup as Honduras and Panama drew in Tegucigalpa.

2014 FIFA World Cup qualification – CONCACAF fourth round – Seventh matchday
6 September 2013
20:00 (UTC-6)

Costa Rica	3–1	United States
Acosta 2'; Borges 10'; Campbell 76'	Report	Dempsey 43' (pen.)

Estadio Nacional, San José
Attendance: 35,000
Referee: Marco Rodríguez (Mexico)

=== Long term ===
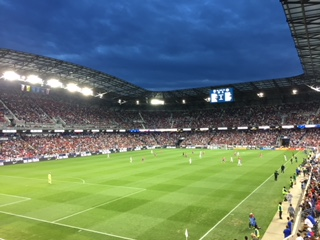
In 2017, Costa Rica defeated the United States in New Jersey, a significant blow to American hopes of qualifying to the 2018 FIFA World Cup

American media refer to the game as Snow Clasico, evoking the "El Clásico" name used for matches between Real Madrid and Barcelona, as well as numerous rivalries throughout the globe. The Colorado Rapids, who use the Dick's Sporting Goods Park as their home stadium, cited the match as "likely the most iconic soccer match ever played in Colorado." CRHoy's Adrián Mendoza has pointed that the United States Soccer Federation often uses pictures from the Snow Clasico to promote future matches against Costa Rica.

In Costa Rica, the Snow Clasico is retrospectively seen as a watershed moment for their national team. After qualifying to the 2014 FIFA World Cup, Jorge Luis Pinto admitted his players showed a change in their attitudes after the match, which he described as "the worst rudeness I have ever seen in football." At the 2014 World Cup, Costa Rica surprisingly reached the quarter-finals after topping their group against three former world champions, winning a penalty shoot-out against Greece, and losing against the Netherlands through the same means, thus leaving the tournament undefeated. Costa Rican media traces the origin of this successful campaign to the Snow Clasico. Guatemalan magazine ContraPoder echoed this view, stating that Costa Rica's performance at the World Cup was a butterfly effect "unleashed when a snowflake fell on the pitch of the Dick's Sporting Goods Park."

The 2018 FIFA World Cup qualification saw the United States failing to qualify to the World Cup, becoming the first time the USA missed the tournament since 1986. Costa Rica played a key role in that elimination, as a heavy 4–0 win over the United States resulted in Jürgen Klinsmann being sacked and replaced by Bruce Arena. With Arena as coach, the Americans achieved a 14-match unbeaten run (which included winning the 2017 CONCACAF Gold Cup), but, in a similar fashion to their 2013 streak under Klinsmann, they were once again stopped by the Costa Ricans in September after an unexpected 0–2 defeat in New Jersey, the first time Costa Rica defeated the United States at a World Cup qualifying match in American soil since 1985. This home loss, described as "shocking" and "a devastating blow", is pinpointed by American media as a major factor to their elimination from the 2018 FIFA World Cup. Former USAMNT player Brian McBride stated that such a crucial loss was in part by a mistaken decision from the United States Soccer Federation in scheduling the game in New Jersey, given a large presence of Costa Ricans in the area, which resulted in a significant portion of the crowd being Costa Rican fans.

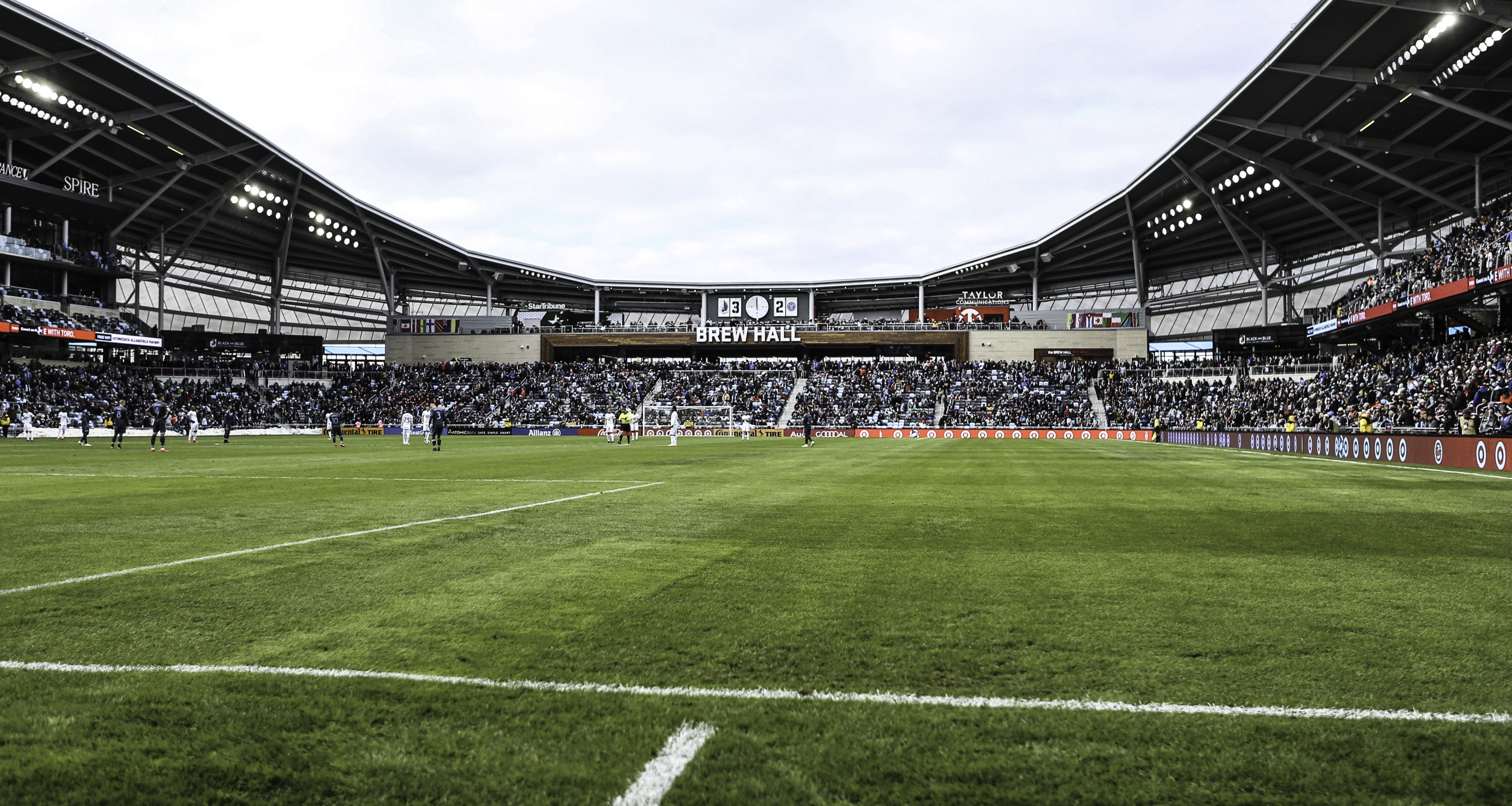
In 2022, the United States took Honduras to another match under freezing conditions, this time at Saint Paul's Allianz Field

On 2 February 2022, the United States took another Central American team to a match under freezing conditions, as they defeated Honduras by 3–0 as part of the 2022 FIFA World Cup qualifying process. While the pitch was not covered in snow, the temperature was significantly lower than that experienced during the Snow Clásico, as news outlets reported a temperature ranging from 5 °F (−15 °C) to 1 °F (−17 °C), becoming the coldest match ever played by the United States' men national team history. Two Honduran players, goalkeeper Luis López and forward Romell Quioto, had to be substituted at half-time as they were showing symptoms of hypothermia. FIFPRO indicates that FIFA does not have any guidelines for "extreme cold" situations, but that FIFPRO themselves recommend that "training and matches be cancelled and rescheduled when the air temperature is less than -15 degrees Centigrade and when the Wind Chill Temperature is less than -27 degrees Centigrade."

The USSF was criticized as a result of the harsh conditions of the match. Honduras' coach Hernán Darío Gómez said "playing like this is of no use. It is not a football spectacle, it is not normal" and that "football is not meant to be suffered. All of my players are unwell, some even with intravenous therapy." New York Times' Sam Stejskal said that "playing Wednesday’s match in such brutal weather was by no means necessary", and that the USSF could have chosen a venue in Southern areas, with little Honduran presence. Former USMNT player Herculez Gomez took to Twitter to criticize both the Snow Clásico (which he played) and the match against Honduras, saying "Iconic? Yes. Stupid? Also yes." David Faitelson described CONCACAF, FIFA, and the USSF as "shameless" and that "footballers' physical integrity must be above everything." Like their Snow Clásico counterparts, American players took the match in a lighter tone after the victory, but some such as Reggie Cannon, Weston McKennie, and Timothy Weah hinted at their unwillingness to ever play again under such conditions. Also, like Klinsmann did in 2013, coach Gregg Berhalter defended the legitimacy of the match, and said that "when we go down to those countries, and it's 90 degrees and 90% dew point and it's unbearable humidity and guys are getting dehydrated and cramping up and getting heat exhaustion, that's the nature of our competition."

The Snow Clasico remained the last American victory over Costa Rica at a FIFA World Cup qualification match for more than eight years, until a 2–1 victory at Columbus' Lower.com Field on 13 October 2021. In contrast, a March 2022 match in San José saw a youngster-filled Costa Rica score a 2–0 win to increase their winning streak against the Americans at home soil.

=== Reception of referee Joel Aguilar in Costa Rica ===
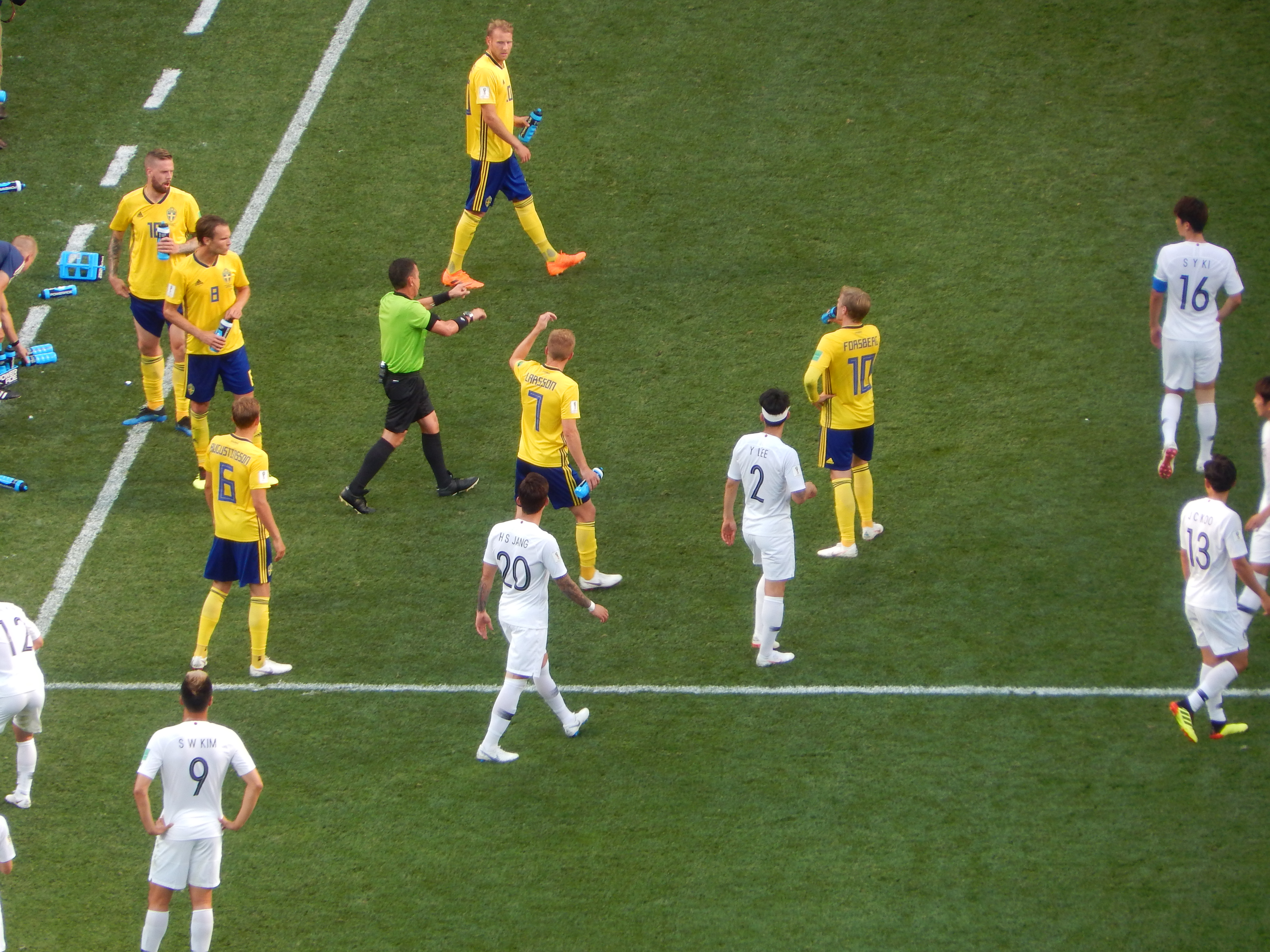
Joel Aguilar awarding a VAR-reviewed penalty to Sweden during their 2018 FIFA World Cup match against South Korea. A La Nación journalist was critical of Aguilar's officiating during this match because of this action

After officiating in the Snow Clasico, Salvadoran referee Joel Aguilar is seen in a widely negative light in Costa Rica. Local media refer to him as "el árbitro de la nieve" (the snow referee), and often scrutinize his designations and nominations. AMPrensa's Esteban Fallas called both Aguilar and Walter López Castellanos "disastrous."

Following the controversial refereeing at the 2015 CONCACAF Gold Cup, the Costa Rican Football Federation issued a formal request to CONCACAF, demanding that a number of referees, including Aguilar, do not officiate future Costa Rica matches; in the case of Aguilar, the letter cites his involvement in the Snow Clasico. CONCACAF denied this request, and Aguilar, cited by CONCACAF's deputy general secretary Ted Howard as "the best CONCACAF referee in 2015," has since officiated further Costa Rica matches. When asked in a 2019 interview for El Diario de Hoy, Aguilar himself said that having teams request that certain referees do not officiate their matches "is something that should not happen." In 2017, Honduran newspaper Diario Diez pointed the negative reaction by Costa Rican media whenever Aguilar was designated to officiate one of their matches.

Since the Snow Clasico, Aguilar has been subject to scrutiny by Costa Rican sports media, even for matches not involving any Costa Rican team. In 2016, he officiated a Copa América Centenario semi-final match between Colombia and Chile, which had to be suspended momentarily because of a thunderstorm. CRHoy echoed two tweets by Mexican journalist Rafael Ramos, who questioned why Aguilar stopped the Copa América match but resumed the Snow Clasico, and also signaled complaints by Colombian coach José Pekerman about Aguilar's refereeing. At the 2018 FIFA World Cup, Sweden defeated South Korea with a VAR-conceded penalty scored by Andreas Granqvist. The match was officiated by Aguilar Chicas, who failed to spot the foul and was corrected by the video-assisted referees. In reaction to this, La Nación's Daniel Jiménez questioned if Aguilar was indeed the best referee in the CONCACAF region while commenting "once again, Joel Aguilar Chicas is the villain, but to no surprise," and called his officiating "the worst of the tournament so far."

In retrospective, Aguilar has stated that the snow match was "historic" for him, as "it was a game in which I learned so much, and went from hell to glory," as he initially was afraid that the match would cost him his spot at the 2014 FIFA World Cup, but rather than being reprimanded for not suspending the match, FIFA's Head of Refereeing Development Massimo Busacca congratulated him for his handling of the Snow Clasico. In response, Costa Rican footballer Cristian Gamboa, who played in that match, said that Aguilar was "perhaps congratulated for helping the Americans."

In 2019, fellow Salvadoran referee Iván Barton hinted at Aguilar's retirement through a Facebook post that he later deleted. CRHoy's Hermes Solano echoed this with a note titled "Will Costa Rica finally 'get rid' of Joel Aguilar Chicas?" His retirement was confirmed in January 2020.
