= El Clásico (disambiguation) =

El Clásico is the name given to any football match between Real Madrid CF and FC Barcelona.

The term clásico has also become used for several other sports rivalries. Some of which include:

== Europe ==
=== In Spain ===
- El Viejo Clásico, the Athletic Bilbao - Real Madrid CF rivalry
- Athletic–Barcelona clásico, the Athletic Bilbao - FC Barcelona rivalry
- El Otro Clásico, the Atlético de Madrid - FC Barcelona
  - Madrid derby, the match between Atlético de Madrid - Real Madrid CF
- El Clásico (basketball), the basketball game between Real Madrid Baloncesto and FC Barcelona Bàsquet

=== Outside of Spain ===
- El Klassikko, Classic of Finland, the pesäpallo game between Sotkamon Jymy and Vimpelin Veto
- Liverpool F.C.–Manchester United F.C. rivalry, Classic of England or North West Derby, the Liverpool F.C. - Manchester United F.C. rivalry
- Le Classique, Classic of France, the Paris Saint-Germain F.C. - Olympique de Marseille rivalry
- Der Klassiker, Classic of Germany, the Borussia Dortmund - FC Bayern Munich rivalry
- Milan Derby, Classic of Italy, the Inter Milan - AC Milan rivalry
- An Clasaiceach, Classic of Ireland, Bohemian F.C. - Shamrock Rovers F.C.
- De Klassieker, Classic of the Netherlands, the AFC Ajax - Feyenoord rivalry
- O Clássico, Classic of Portugal, the S.L. Benfica - FC Porto rivalry
- Clasicul României, Classic of Romania, the Steaua Bucharest/FCSB - Dinamo Bucharest rivalry
- Old Firm, Classic of Scotland, the Celtic F.C. - Rangers F.C. rivalry
- Klassikern, Classic of Sweden, the AIK - IFK Göteborg rivalry
- Kıtalararası Derbi, Classic of Turkey, the Fenerbahce - Galatasaray
- Klasychne derby, Classic of Ukraine, the FC Dynamo Kyiv - FC Shakhtar Donetsk rivalry
- El Clásico, a name sometimes used for any ranking snooker match between John Higgins and Ronnie O'Sullivan

== North America ==
- Al Classico, the former rivalry between Cavalry FC and FC Edmonton
- El Clásico Angelino, the Los Angeles Galaxy - Chivas USA rivalry (Los Angeles, USA)
- California Clásico, the Los Angeles Galaxy - San Jose Earthquakes derby (California, USA)
- Canadian Classique, Classic of Canada, the CF Montréal - Toronto FC rivalry
- Clásico Capitalino, the América - Pumas UNAM derby (Mexico City, Mexico)
- El Clásico Chapín, Classic of Guatemala, the C.S.D. Comunicaciones and C.S.D. Municipal derby (Guatemala City, Guatemala)
- Clásico Joven, the América - Cruz Azul derby (Mexico City, Mexico)
- Clásico Regiomontano, the Rayados de Monterrey - Tigres UANL derby (Monterrey, Mexico)
- Clásico Tapatío, the Chivas de Guadalajara - Atlas derby (Guadalajara, Mexico)
- SEC Clásico, the SEC Derby in English, the Kentucky - South Carolina men's rivalry (USA)
- El Súper Clásico (Mexico), Classic of Mexico, the América - Guadalajara rivalry (Mexico)
- Superclasico Hondureño, Classic of Honduras, the Motagua - Olimpia derby (Tegucigalpa, Honduras)
- El Tráfico, the Los Angeles Galaxy - Los Angeles Football Club derby
- El Clamico, the Hartford Athletic - Rhode Island FC local rivalry

== South America ==
- Chilean Super Clásico, Classic of Chile, the Colo Colo - Universidad de Chile derby (Santiago, Chile)
- Clásico del Astillero, Classic of Ecuador, the Barcelona - Emelec derby (Guayaquil, Ecuador)
- Clássico dos Milhões, the Flamengo - Vasco da Gama derby (Rio de Janeiro, Brazil)
- Clássico Majestoso, the São Paulo - Corinthians derby (São Paulo, Brazil)
- Paraguayan Superclásico, Classic of Paraguay, the Olimpia - Cerro Porteño derby (Asunción, Paraguay)
- Peruvian Clásico, Classic of Peru, the Alianza Lima - Universitario de Deportes derby (Lima, Perú)
- Superclásico, Classic of Argentina, the Boca Juniors - River Plate derby (Buenos Aires, Argentina)
- Uruguayan Clásico, Classic of Uruguay, the Nacional - Peñarol derby (Montevideo, Uruguay)

== Asia ==
- Iran El Clasico, Classic of Iran, Persepolis – Sepahan
- Indonesian Superclásico, Classic of Indonesia, the Persija Jakarta – Persib Bandung derby (Indonesia)
- Iraqi El Clásicos, the derbies between Al-Quwa Al-Jawiya, Al-Shorta, Al-Talaba and Al-Zawraa (Baghdad, Iraq)
- Kuwaiti El Clásico, Classic of Kuwait, Al-Arabi – Al-Qadsia rivalry
- Manila Clasico, Classic of the Philippines, Barangay Ginebra San Miguel – San Mig Coffee Mixers (Manila, Philippines)
- Saudi El Clasico, Classic of Saudi Arabia, Al Ittihad – Al Hilal derby
- Chennai Super Kings–Mumbai Indians cricket rivalry also known as El Clasico of Indian Premier League or el clasico of cricket, IP-L clasico, Super Indian Derby. The match is played between Chennai Super Kings and Mumbai Indians (Chennai and Mumbai, India)
- Dhaka Dynamites – Comilla Victorians also known as El Clasico of Bangladesh Premier League or BPL Clasico. The match is played between Dhaka and Comilla two most successful franchises from Bangladesh.
- Kolkata Derby, Mohun Bagan AC – SC East Bengal (Kolkata, India) known as fiercest football rivalry in Asia & first football rivalry in Asia
- Dhaka Derby, Abahani – Mohammedan known as fiercest football rivalry in Bangladesh. also known as El Clasico of Bangladesh or el clasico of BPL.

Other uses

- LCK - LPL, The Classic World Cup situation in League of Legends, where a Korean and a Chinese Pro team often find themselves clashing in World Finals Games. (see recent 2024 Championship, 2023 Championship, 2021 Championship, 2020 Championship among many)

== Oceania ==
- Crusaders – Blues rivalry also known as El Clasico of New Zealand Rugby or El Clasico of Modern Rugby, New Zealand Derby. Match is played between Crusaders and Blues (Auckland and Christchurch, New Zealand)
- South Sydney Rabbitohs – Sydney Roosters rivalry, the El Clasico equivalent of New South Wales and Australian rugby league.
- Queensland Derby, the El Clasico of rugby league in Queensland National Rugby League clubs, the Brisbane Broncos and North Queensland Cowboys
- The Big Blue, Australian soccer's clasico game between its two biggest professional football clubs, Melbourne Victory and Sydney FC
- New Zealand Derby, formerly referred to as the "Kiwi Clasico", the rivalry game played between New Zealand's only professional football clubs. Played between Auckland FC and the Wellington Phoenix

Other uses

- Snow Clasico – Name coined by American sports media to refer to a 2014 FIFA World Cup qualification – CONCACAF fourth round match between the United States and Costa Rica played under snowy conditions on 22 March 2013

== See also ==
- El clásico (film), a 2015 Iraqi-Norwegian film
- The Classic (disambiguation)
- Superclasico (disambiguation)
