= Talviklassikko =

Finnish ice hockey match

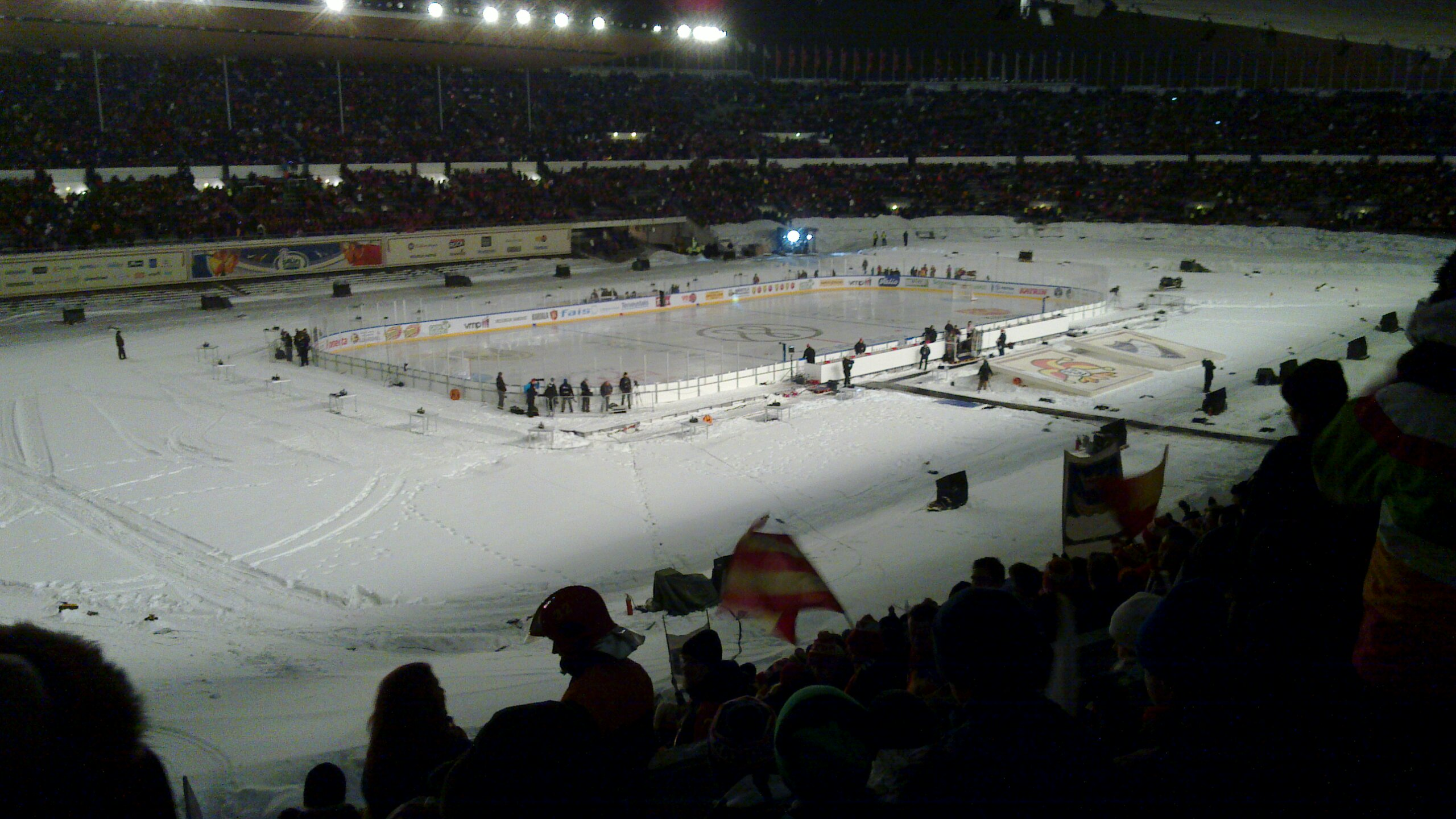
Talviklassikko

Talviklassikko (Finnish for Winter Classic) was a name used for an outdoor ice hockey game held in 2011, 2012 and 2014 in the Helsinki Olympic Stadium. The games were played between HIFK and Jokerit. The games counted as SM-liiga games and points were given to each team just like in a regular game.

In 2013, the Talviklassikko was not held, because the national football team's program included a World Cup qualifier at the beginning of June at the Olympic Stadium. Due to the early timing, the stadium grass should have been replaced with foreign transfer grass, which proved to be too expensive an option. Instead of the Talviklassikko, Tappara and Ilves from Tampere faced in the Open Ice Winter Classic Tampere outdoor match on December 14, 2013.
