= The Classic (newspaper) =

US student newspaper

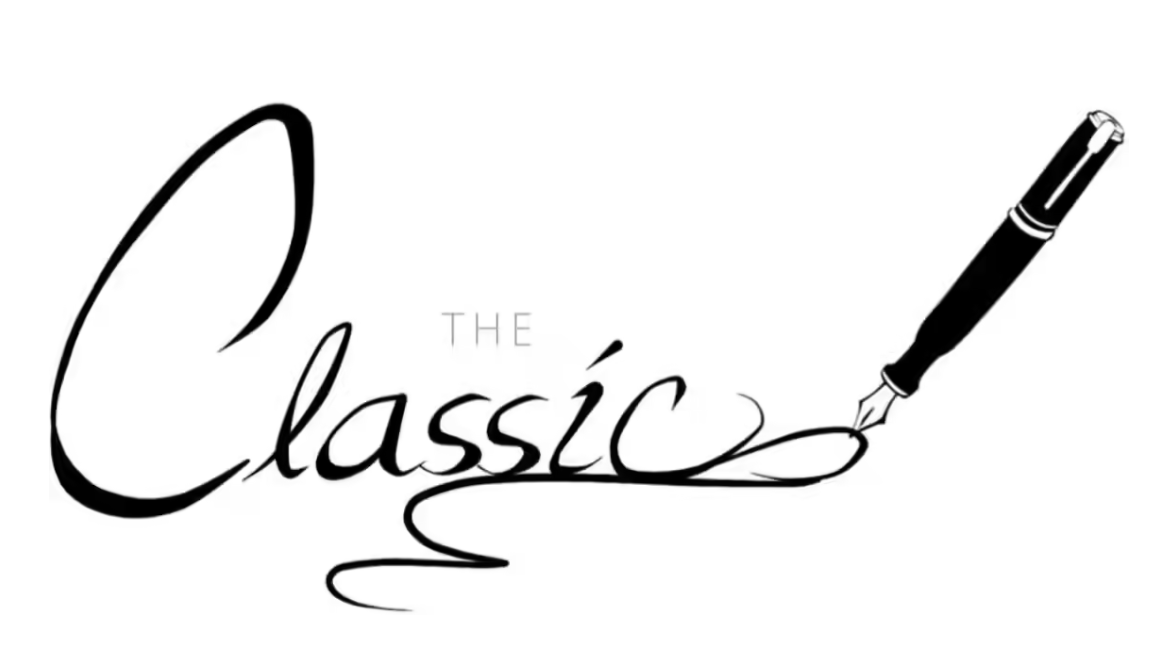

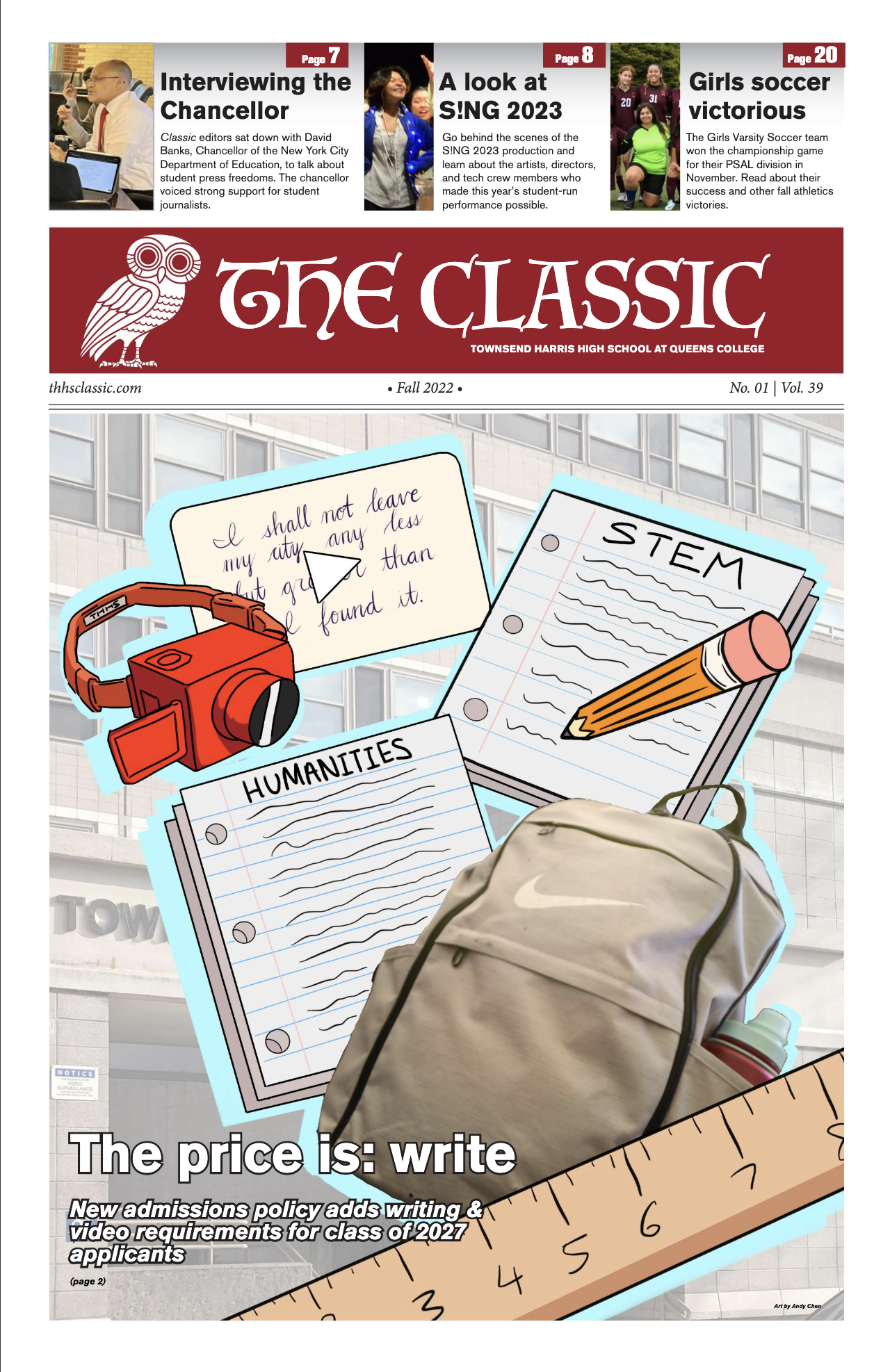
- Type: Online
- School: Townsend Harris High School at Queens College
- Owner: Independent
- Editor-in-chief: Ryan Chen and Yasmeen Ismail
- Founded: 1984
- City: Flushing, New York
- Website: thhsclassic.com

The Classic is the student-run high school newspaper of Townsend Harris High School in Queens, New York. Frequently named the best high school newspaper in New York City by Baruch College's NYC public school journalism awards, the paper has run free of censorship and administrative review since its founding in the fall of 1984. In recent years, reporting by The Classic has been cited by publications like The New York Times, The Washington Post, The New York Post, The Wall Street Journal, and the Associated Press. Classic journalists have also been featured in various publications, including Teen Vogue, The Village Voice, and The New York Times. The paper publishes new content online on weeknights throughout the school year and publishes a print edition of collected pieces on a quarterly basis.

== History ==
The original Townsend Harris Hall Prep School, founded in 1849 and located in Manhattan, was closed by New York City mayor Fiorello La Guardia in 1942. After the reopening of Townsend Harris in Queens in the fall of 1984, the first edition of The Classic was published that December. The Classic ran exclusively as a print newspaper, published around ten times a year, until the fall of 2012, when it began to publish both in print and online.

The first Editor-in-Chief of The Classic, Heather Nash, credits her father with coming up with the name for the paper after seeing bumper stickers that read, “Townsend Harris: A Touch of the Classic.”

=== Free press charter ===
Malcolm Largmann, the first principal of the re-founded Townsend Harris, retired in the spring of 2001. During his tenure, student editors printed the newspaper without administrative review of content despite the 1988 Hazelwood Supreme Court decision that granted principals broad powers to oversee the content of school newspapers. Before Largmann's retirement, then Classic advisor Ilsa Cowen worked with student editors to draft a charter that would ensure Largmann's decision to refrain from administrative censorship of the paper became a matter of school policy.

The Classic Charter formally established the paper as an "open forum for the expression of student views," a commitment ensuring that the 1969 Tinker Supreme Court decision applies to Classic journalists rather than the Hazelwood decision. Largmann signed the Charter in 2000 and every subsequent principal of Townsend Harris has signed it upon becoming principal. Since its creation, the Charter has been cited by various publications in discussions about censorship and First Amendment rights in schools.

=== Principal hiring controversy and fake news accusation ===
In August 2016, Rosemarie Jahoda was named interim acting principal of Townsend Harris after then Principal Anthony Barbetta abruptly announced his departure from the school. Before Jahoda was appointed permanent principal of the school, a petition and a sit-in protest in December resulted in the hiring process being temporarily paused. The NYC Department of Education reopened the hiring process the following month. The Classic live-streamed the sit-in, and the video was cited in coverage from professional outlets. 2017 Editors Mehrose Ahmad and Sumaita Hasan, who live-streamed the protest, published a series of pieces covering the community's objections to Jahoda's appointment and the DOE's process for hiring a permanent principal.

“We’re here not only to affirm that the journalism done by these young reporters is accurate and in context, but to celebrate it at a national convention of 4,000-plus high school journalists.”

— Student Press Law Center Executive Director Hadar Harris

In March 2017, a representative from the superintendent's office met with local politicians and characterized the news stories about Jahoda as "fake news." Ahmad and Hasan obtained evidence of the accusation made at the closed door meeting and then published a letter to the superintendent, chancellor, and mayor disputing the charge of fake news. The accusation, and The Classic's response, was covered by numerous outlets, with a source in an article by The Columbia Journalism Review calling it "the first time we’ve heard of the ‘fake news’ weapon being turned on students."

Ultimately, Jahoda was not hired for the permanent position. For their months of coverage, Ahmad and Hasan received the national Courage in Student Journalism award from the Student Press Law Center in the fall of 2017.

=== Teacher sexual misconduct coverage ===
In the spring of 2020, an alumni-run Instagram page posted allegations of sexual misconduct by former Townsend Harris teachers. Classic journalists investigated the claims and published a series of pieces from May 2020 to June 2021 about how the school had responded to claims of educator sexual misconduct. The articles explored policies and procedures that prevented open discussions with students and families after teachers are removed for allegations of misconduct. In November 2021, then Editors-in-Chief Ryan Eng, Julia Maciejak, and Jasmine Palma appeared on the front page of The New York Post after Post journalist Susan Edelman reported that Eng, Maciejak, and Palma's behind the scenes efforts, including their filing of a Freedom of Information request, to report on another teacher accused of misconduct led to his removal from the school. Eng, Maciejak, and Palma's further reporting led to a student sit-in, more coverage from city publications, an on-the-record meeting with the United Federation of Teachers, and a pledge from the DOE to change policies related to how the city handles educator misconduct.

In February 2022, Eng, Maciejak, and Palma were featured on an Instagram Live session with New York Times journalists Jodi Kantor and Megan Twohey, who won the Pulitzer Prize for breaking the Harvey Weinstein sexual abuse story. The three Classic editors were invited to discuss Kantor and Twohey's book on the Weinstein story and their own experiences covering sexual misconduct in a high school.

== Organization and content ==
The Classic is led by a team of three Editors-in-Chief and four Managing Editors. They oversee a team of over forty section editors and over two hundred staff members. The News, Features, Opinion, Arts & Entertainment, Science & Technology, and Sports department editors and staff writers produce coverage for the online and print editions. Multimedia, Art, Photography, Social Media, Sports Media, and livestream editors and staff produce additional content for the online/print editions and for social media platforms. The Copy Editing department reviews and fact-checks all content. An advisor works with student editors and staff members throughout the publication process. Student leaders make all final publication decisions.

=== Coverage ===
According to The Classic Charter, "no subjects" are "off limits" to Classic journalists for publication. Student editors meet with staff reporters to generate topics for coverage and use a Classic style guide to ensure professional procedures are followed.

Classic reporters regularly request and receive comments from press offices. Arts & Entertainment critics have press credentials to review films from major movie studios prior to their release.

=== Multimedia publications ===
The Classic runs a YouTube channel, multiple podcasts, and produces a yearly college video. The creation of the 2020 College Video, produced remotely during the COVID-19 pandemic, was spotlighted in a New York Times article on student journalists; the final video was published in the online version of the article on the Times website.
