= Classical =

Classical may refer to:

== European antiquity ==
- Classical antiquity, a period of history from roughly the 7th or 8th century B.C.E. to the 5th century C.E. centered on the Mediterranean Sea
- Classical architecture, architecture derived from Greek and Roman architecture of classical antiquity
- Classical mythology, the body of myths from the ancient Greeks and Romans
- Classical tradition, the reception of classical Greco-Roman antiquity by later cultures
- Classics, study of the language and culture of classical antiquity, particularly its literature
- Classicism, a high regard for classical antiquity in the arts

== Music and arts ==
- Classical ballet, the most formal of the ballet styles
- Classical music, a variety of Western musical styles from the 9th century to the present
- Classical guitar, a common type of acoustic guitar
- Classical Hollywood cinema, a visual and sound style in the American film industry between 1927 and 1963
- Classical Indian dance, various codified art forms whose theory can be traced back to 400 BC
- Classical period (music), a period of increased interest in classicism from 1750 to 1825
- Classical unities, rules for drama derived from a passage in Aristotle's Poetics
- Classical (album), a 1997 album by Wolf Hoffmann
- A Classical, a 2013 album by Ayumi Hamasaki

== Language ==
- Classical language, any language with a literature that is considered classical
  - Classical Arabic, the Arabic language in which the Qur'an is written
  - Classical Armenian, the oldest attested form of the Armenian language
  - Classical Chinese, the language of the classic literature from the end of the Spring and Autumn period
  - Classical French, the French language as systematised in the 17th and 18th centuries
  - Classical Latin, the Latin language used by the ancient Romans
  - Classical Nahuatl, the language spoken by Aztec nobles in the Valley of Mexico at the time of the 16th-century Spanish conquest

== Science and mathematics ==
- Classical economics, school of economics developed in the late 18th and early 19th century
- Classical logic, a class of formal logics that have been most intensively studied and most widely used
- Classical mechanics, the set of physical laws describing the motion of bodies under the action of a system of forces
- Classical physics, the study of physics before the general theory of relativity and quantum mechanics

== Other uses ==
- Classical liberalism, a political philosophy and ideology belonging to liberalism
- Classical conditioning, a kind of learning that occurs when a conditioned stimulus is paired with an unconditioned stimulus
- Classical time control, a category of time control used in chess
- The Classical, a defunct American sports website

== See also ==
- Classic, an outstanding example of a particular style, something of lasting worth or with a timeless quality
- List of classical music styles, styles of music considered classical
- Classic (disambiguation)
- Classical period (disambiguation)
- Classics (disambiguation)
