= Denham Hospitality Summer Classic =

2013 curling tournament in Alberta, Canada

The Denham Hospitality Summer Classic was a bonspiel, or curling tournament, that took place at the Leduc Curling Club in Leduc, Alberta, Canada. The tournament was held in a round robin format. The tournament only existed for one season, in 2013, as part of the World Curling Tour.

== Past champions ==
Only skip's name is displayed.

=== Men ===
| Year | Winning team | Runner up team | Purse (CAD) |
|---|---|---|---|
| 2013 | (China) Liu Rui | (British Columbia) Daylan Vavrek | $8,500 |

=== Women ===
| Year | Winning team | Runner up team | Purse (CAD) |
|---|---|---|---|
| 2013 | (China) Wang Bingyu | (Alberta) Valerie Sweeting | $8,500 |
