= Classics (disambiguation) =

Classics is the branch of humanities dealing with the ancient Mediterranean world.

Classics may also refer to:

- Classics, outstanding examples of a particular style; something of lasting worth or with a timeless quality
- Chinese classics, the classical texts of Confucianism and Chinese scholarly literature; the mainstay of study in ancient China, Korea, and Japan
  - especially, the Four Books and Five Classics, core texts in the Confucian tradition
  - or, the Thirteen Classics, the basis for the Imperial Examinations during the Song dynasty

== Music ==
=== Albums ===
- Classics (Ali Project album), 2001
- Classics (Aphex Twin album), 1994
- Classics (Joey Beltram album), 1996
- Classics (Era album), 2009
- Classics (George Canyon album)
- Classics (Hybrid album), 2012
- Classics (Jennifer Rush album)
- Classics (Kenny Rogers and Dottie West album), 1979
- Classics (Model 500 album), 1993
- Classics (Patty Loveless album)
- Classics (Ratatat album), 2006
- Classics (Sarah Brightman album)
- Classics (She & Him album)
- Classics (Triumph album), 1989
- Classics, by Susan Werner
- Styx Classics Volume 15, a 1987 compilation for the band Styx,
- Classics (Ali Project EP)
- The Classics (album)

=== Artists and labels ===
- Chronological Classics, a French jazz re-issue label
- The Classics, a musical group of the 1960s
- Classixx, an electronic record production and DJ Duo

== Publishing imprints ==
- Bantam Classic Book Series
- Barnes & Noble Classics series
- Everyman Classics
- Oxford World's Classics
- Penguin Classics
- Signet Classics

== Sports ==
- American Classic Races, a series of three Thoroughbred horse races
- British Classic Races, five horse races run during the traditional flat racing season
- Classic cycle races, one-day professional cycling road races in the international calendar
- Swedish Classic Circuit, a diploma awarded to those who have finished races in cross country skiing, cycling, swimming, and cross country running during a 12-month period

== Video games ==
- Classics HD, a group of classic PlayStation 2 video games, remastered in high-definition for PlayStation 3
- PlayStation 2 classics, a group of classic PlayStation 2 video games
- PSone Classics, a group of classic PlayStation video games

== Other uses ==
- Kabel eins classics, a German pay television channel

== See also ==
- Classic (disambiguation)
- Classical (disambiguation)
