= 2020–21 Liga FPD =

Liga FPD
- Season: 2020–21

The 2020–21 Liga FPD season, is the 100th season since its establishment.

== Managerial changes ==
=== Before the start of the season ===
Team	Outgoing manager	Manner of departure	Date of vacancy	Replaced by	Date of appointment	Position in table

=== During the Apertura season ===
Team	Outgoing manager	Manner of departure	Date of vacancy	Replaced by	Date of appointment	Position in table
Municipal Grecia	(Costa Rica) Luis Diego Arnaez	Sacked	2020	(Costa Rica) Luis Rodriguez	2020	th (Apertura 2020)

=== Between the Apertura and Clausura season ===
Team	Outgoing manager	Manner of departure	Date of vacancy	Replaced by	Date of appointment	Position in table
Herediano	(Costa Rica) Jafet Soto	Sacked	December 2020	(Mexico) Fernando Palomeque	December 2020	
Grecia	(Costa Rica) José Rodríguez	Interimship finished	December 2020	(Costa Rica) Gilberto Martínez	December 2020	
Sporting San José	(Costa Rica) Randall Row	Sacked	December 2020	(Argentina) José Giacone	December 2020	

=== During the Clausura season ===
Team	Outgoing manager	Manner of departure	Date of vacancy	Replaced by	Date of appointment	Position in table

== Apertura ==
=== Standings ===
Pos	Team	Pld	W	D	L	GF	GA	GD	Pts	Qualification or relegation
1	Alajuelense (C)	16	12	1	3	36	18	+18	37	Advance to Playoffs and (if necessary) Grand final
2	Saprissa (A)	16	9	3	4	29	16	+13	30	Advance to Playoffs
3	Cartaginés	16	9	2	5	32	16	+16	29	Advance to Playoffs
4	Herediano	16	7	5	4	27	19	+8	26	Advance to Playoffs
5	San Carlos	16	6	5	5	14	15	−1	23	
6	Limón	16	6	5	5	15	24	−9	23	
7	Guadalupe	16	6	3	7	25	27	−2	21	
8	Jicaral	16	4	6	6	14	15	−1	18	
9	Sporting San José	16	5	3	8	20	24	−4	18	
10	Pérez Zeledón	16	4	3	9	20	34	−14	15	
11	Santos de Guápiles	16	2	8	6	12	24	−12	14	
12	Grecia	16	2	4	10	14	26	−12	10	

Updated to match(es) played on unknown. Source:
Rules for classification: 1) points; 2) goal difference; 3) goals scored; 4) head-to-head points; 5) head-to-head goal difference; 6) head-to-head goals scored; 7) draw
(A) Advance to a further round; (C) Champions

== Clausura ==
=== Standings ===
Pos	Team	Pld	W	D	L	GF	GA	GD	Pts	Qualification or relegation
1	Alajuelense (Q)	22	14	8	0	49	12	+37	50	Advance to Playoffs and (if necessary) Grand final
2	Santos de Guápiles (Q)	22	10	6	6	36	29	+7	36	Advance to Playoffs
3	Herediano	22	7	9	6	35	29	+6	30	Advance to Playoffs
4	Saprissa	22	6	11	5	31	29	+2	29	Advance to Playoffs
5	San Carlos	22	7	8	7	21	24	−3	29	
6	Jicaral	22	6	10	6	21	24	−3	28	
7	Pérez Zeledón	22	6	10	6	22	29	−7	28	
8	Cartaginés	22	6	8	8	23	27	−4	26	
9	Sporting San José	22	6	5	11	18	31	−13	23	
10	Grecia	22	4	11	7	22	29	−7	23	
11	Guadalupe	22	4	10	8	33	31	+2	22	
12	Limón	22	5	6	11	25	42	−17	21	

Updated to match(es) played on unknown. Source:
Rules for classification: 1) points; 2) goal difference; 3) goals scored; 4) head-to-head points; 5) head-to-head goal difference; 6) head-to-head goals scored; 7) draw
(Q) Qualified for the phase indicated

== List of foreign players in the league ==
This is a list of foreign players in the 2020–21 season. The following players:

1. Have played at least one game for the respective club.
2. Have not been capped for the Costa Rica national football team on any level, independently from the birthplace

A new rule was introduced this season, that clubs can have four foreign players per club and can only add a new player if there is an injury or a player is released and it's before the close of the season transfer window.

Club	Player 1	Player 2	Player 3	Player 4	Former Players
Alajuelense	(Argentina) Facundo Zabala	(Honduras) Alexander López	(Panama) Adolfo Machado		
Cartaginés	(Argentina) Joaquin Aguirre	(Cuba) Marcel Hernández	(Nicaragua) Byron Bonilla		
Grecia	(Argentina) Leonel Peralta	(Haiti) Naël Élysée	(Mexico) Aldo Magaña		
Guadalupe	(Argentina) Lautaro Ayala				
Herediano	(Brazil) Leandrinho				
Jicaral	(Argentina) Ismael Gómez	(Brazil) Kennedy Rocha Pereira	(Uruguay) Joaquin Santellan		
Limón	(Chile) Carlos Soza				
Pérez Zeledón	(Argentina) Hernan Fener	(Brazil) Enrique Moura	(Jamaica) Craig Foster		
San Carlos	(Jamaica) Javon East	(Mexico) Julio Cruz	(Panama) Jorman Aguilar		
Santos de Guápiles	(Nicaragua) Jason Ingram	(Panama) Víctor Griffith			
Deportivo Saprissa	(Argentina) Esteban Espíndola	(Argentina) Mariano Torres	(Trinidad and Tobago) Aubrey David		
Sporting					

(player released during the Apertura season) (player released between the Apertura and Clausura seasons) (player released during the Clausura season)
