= 2017–18 Liga FPD – Apertura season =

Association football season in 2017

Liga FPD
- Season: 2017–18
- Dates: 29 July – 23 December
- Champions: Pérez Zeledón (1st title)
- CONCACAF League or CONCACAF Champions League: Pérez Zeledón
- Matches: 146
- Goals: 426 (2.92 per match)
- Top goalscorer: Jonathan McDonald (15 goals)
- Biggest home win: Saprissa 6–1 Grecia (3/4 September 2017); Santos 5–0 Grecia (29 October 2017); Herediano 5–0 UCR (1 November 2017)
- Biggest away win: Guadalupe 0–4 Santos (15 October 2017); Cartaginés 2–6 Carmelita (25 October 2017); Liberia 1–5 Saprissa (19 November 2017)
- Highest scoring: Cartaginés 2–6 Carmelita (25 October 2017)
- Longest winning run: 5 matches Herediano (Two times)
- Longest unbeaten run: 22 matches Herediano
- Longest winless run: 8 matches Guadalupe; UCR (Two times)
- Longest losing run: 6 matches Alajuelense; Guadalupe; Liberia
- Highest attendance: 17,037; Saprissa 2–0 Alajuelense (29 October 2017)
- Lowest attendance: 210; Santos 4–0 Pérez Zeledón (30 July 2017)
- Total attendance: 388,793

The 2018 Apertura season served as the opening half of the 2017–18 Liga FPD association football season. It began on 29 July 2017 and ended on 23 December 2017.

Herediano entered as the defending champions, but lost the title in the Apertura finals to Pérez Zeledón.

== Personnel and kits ==
Team	Chairman	Manager	Captain	Kit manufacturer	Shirt sponsor
Alajuelense	Fernando Ocampo	(Uruguay) Wílmer López	(Costa Rica) Patrick Pemberton	Puma	Toyota, Claro, Volaris
Carmelita	Isidro Zamora	(Costa Rica) Mario Víquez	(Costa Rica) Carlos Acosta	Sportek	Great Wall Motors, Universidad Santa Lucía
Cartaginés	Luis Vargas	(Costa Rica) Adrián Leandro	(Costa Rica) Danny Fonseca	Joma	Bancrédito, Premium, TWO
Grecia	Dagoberto Matamoros	(Costa Rica) Walter Centeno	(Costa Rica) Daniel Vallejos	ProSport	ROES, Super Rosvil
Guadalupe	Vacant	(Mexico) Antonio Abasolo	To be determined	Pirma	Dream Travels, Papa John's
Herediano	David Patey	Hernán Medford	(Costa Rica) Óscar Granados	Umbro	Kölbi, Huawei, San Miguel, Coca-Cola, Papa John's, Toyota
Liberia	Julio Salas	(Uruguay) Víctor Abelenda	(Costa Rica) Rafael Núñez	Prosport	Pulmitan, Condovac, Toyota, Philips, Papa John's
Limón	Noel Ferguson	(Costa Rica) Horacio Esquivel	(Costa Rica) Kareem McLean	Sportek	Reina's
Pérez Zeledón	Juan Artavia	(Argentina) José Giacone	(Costa Rica) Keilor Soto	Living Sport	Kölbi, Tracopa
Santos	Rafael Arias	(Costa Rica) Johnny Chávez	(Costa Rica) Edder Monguío	Living Sport	El Colono, Eusse, CopyVisión
Saprissa	Carlos Watson	(Costa Rica) Vladimir Quesada	(Costa Rica) Daniel Colindres	Kappa	Bimbo, Ibérico
UCR	Fernando Ocampo Cano	(Colombia) Marco Arias	(Costa Rica) Darío Delgado	Roma	INS

== Managerial changes ==
Team	Outgoing manager	Manner of departure	Date of vacancy	Position in table	Incoming manager	Date of appointment
UCR	(Costa Rica) Mauricio Wright	Sacked	17 April 2017	Pre-season	(Colombia) Marco Arias	26 May 2017
Cartaginés	(Costa Rica) Jeaustin Campos	Resigned	29 May 2017	Pre-season	(Costa Rica) Javier Delgado	30 May 2017
Liberia	(Costa Rica) Erick Rodríguez	Resigned	27 July 2017	Pre-season	(Costa Rica) Vinicio Alvarado	31 July 2017
Alajuelense	(Spain) Benito Floro	Sacked	21 August 2017	7th	(Costa Rica) Wílmer López	21 August 2017
Guadalupe	(Costa Rica) Luis Fallas	Sacked	4 September 2017	12th	(Mexico) Antonio Abasolo	4 September 2017
Carmelita	(Portugal) Guilherme Farinha	Sacked	28 September 2017	11th	(Costa Rica) Mario Viquez^{1}	24 November 2017
Liberia	(Costa Rica) Vinicio Alvarado	Resigned	7 November 2017	12th	(Costa Rica) Fernando Castro (interim)	7 November 2017
Cartaginés	(Costa Rica) Javier Delgado	Mutual consent	10 November 2017	10th	(Costa Rica) Adrián Leandro^{2}	22 November 2017
Saprissa	(Costa Rica) Carlos Watson	Resigned	17 December 2017	2nd (Quadrangular)	(Costa Rica) Vladimir Quesada	18 December 2017

Notes

- ^{1}: Mario Viquez had already assumed as interim manager of Carmelite following Farinha's departure on 28 September.
- ^{2}: Adrián Leandro had already assumed as interim manager of Cartaginés following Delgado's departure on 10 November.

== League table ==
=== Regular season ===
Defending champions Herediano topped the season undefeated with 54 points. By achieving this, Herediano broke two records in the league. They became the first team with the longest undefeated streak (surpassing the 21-match streak by Saprissa in the 2003–04 season, the team being coincidentally managed by Hernán Medford). The team also broke the record for more points achieved in a regular season, surpassing Alajuelense in the 2014 Invierno season.

On 3 September 2017, the match between Saprissa and Grecia was suspended at the 81st minute due to a false bomb threat. The remaining nine minutes were played the next morning.

==== Standings ====
Pos	Team	Pld	W	D	L	GF	GA	GD	Pts	Qualification
1	Herediano	22	16	6	0	41	12	+29	54	Advanced to the quadrangular and a possible final
2	Saprissa	22	13	4	5	50	27	+23	43	Advanced to the quadrangular
3	Santos de Guápiles	22	11	7	4	46	28	+18	40	Advanced to the quadrangular
4	Pérez Zeledón	22	10	6	6	43	33	+10	36	Advanced to the quadrangular
5	Alajuelense	22	8	7	7	38	31	+7	31	
6	Grecia	22	8	7	7	31	37	−6	31	
7	Limón	22	7	9	6	35	36	−1	30	
8	Cartaginés	22	4	11	7	27	38	−11	23	
9	UCR	22	4	8	10	16	28	−12	20	
10	Carmelita	22	4	6	12	29	38	−9	18	
11	Guadalupe	22	3	7	12	22	36	−14	16	
12	Liberia	22	4	2	16	23	57	−34	14	

Updated to match(es) played on 16 November 2017. Source: Soccerway
Rules for classification: 1) points; 2) goal difference; 3) goals scored; 4) head-to-head points; 5) head-to-head goal difference; 6) head-to-head goals scored; 7) draw

==== Positions by round ====
Quadrangular and possible final
Quadrangular
Relegation (Aggregate table)

Team ╲ Round	1	2	3	4	5	6	7	8	9	10	11	12	13	14	15	16	17	18	19	20	21	22
Herediano	7	4	2	1	1	1	1	1	1	1	1	1	1	1	1	1	1	1	1	1	1	1
Saprissa	3	1	1	2	2	2	2	2	2	2	2	2	2	2	2	2	2	2	2	2	2	2
Santos	1	2	5	6	3	7	7	7	6	7	6	7	6	4	3	3	3	3	3	3	3	3
Pérez Zeledón	12	12	12	9	6	4	3	3	4	6	7	4	3	3	4	4	4	4	4	4	4	4
Alajuelense	2	3	3	5	7	6	5	4	3	3	3	3	4	5	6	7	7	7	6	7	7	5
Grecia	11	7	6	3	4	3	6	6	5	4	4	5	7	7	5	6	6	6	5	5	6	6
Limón	4	5	8	4	5	5	4	5	7	5	5	6	5	6	7	5	5	5	7	6	5	7
Cartaginés	5	8	9	11	11	11	9	8	8	8	8	8	8	9	9	10	11	10	9	9	8	8
UCR	8	6	4	7	8	9	10	11	11	11	9	10	9	8	8	8	8	8	8	8	9	9
Carmelita	10	10	10	12	12	12	11	10	9	10	11	11	11	11	10	9	9	9	10	10	10	10
Guadalupe	6	9	7	10	9	10	12	12	12	12	12	12	12	12	12	11	12	11	11	11	11	11
Liberia	9	11	11	8	10	8	8	9	10	9	10	9	10	10	11	12	10	12	12	12	12	12

==== Results ====
Home \ Away	ALA	CRM	CAR	GRE	GUA	HER	LIB	LIM	PEZ	SAN	SAP	UCR
Alajuelense		1–3	3–3	3–0	0–1	0–1	3–0	3–2	3–3	2–2	2–0	2–1
Carmelita	1–1		1–1	0–1	3–1	0–1	1–4	0–1	2–1	1–1	0–2	1–2
Cartaginés	2–2	2–6		2–2	0–0	0–1	1–0	0–0	2–0	0–0	3–4	1–1
Grecia	0–3	1–1	0–0		1–1	0–1	4–0	3–3	0–3	2–1	1–1	1–0
Guadalupe	1–1	1–1	2–3	0–3		1–2	4–0	1–3	1–2	0–4	1–2	1–1
Herediano	3–2	2–0	3–0	2–1	0–0		4–1	2–0	2–1	2–2	1–1	5–0
Liberia	0–2	2–1	0–3	1–4	4–1	0–2		3–1	2–2	0–2	1–5	2–3
Limón	1–1	2–2	3–1	1–2	2–1	1–1	2–1		2–2	1–1	3–1	2–1
Pérez Zeledón	3–2	3–1	3–3	2–2	1–1	0–1	4–0	2–0		4–1	1–2	3–1
Santos	2–1	3–2	4–0	5–0	0–2	1–4	4–2	2–2	4–0		3–2	0–0
Saprissa	2–0	4–2	3–0	6–1	1–0	1–1	4–0	5–2	1–2	1–2		1–0
C.F. Universidad de Costa Rica	0–1	1–0	0–0	1–2	2–1	0–0	0–0	1–1	0–1	0–2	1–1	

Updated to match(es) played on 22 November 2017. Source: UNAFUT.com
Legend: Blue = home team win; Yellow = draw; Red = away team win.

=== Quadrangular – Apertura ===
==== Teams qualified ====
- Herediano (Title holders, winners of the regular season)
- Saprissa
- Santos de Guápiles
- Pérez Zeledón

==== Standings ====
Pos	Team	Pld	W	D	L	GF	GA	GD	Pts	Qualification
1	Pérez Zeledón	6	4	1	1	9	6	+3	13	Final
2	Saprissa	6	3	1	2	7	6	+1	10	
3	Herediano	6	2	0	4	5	5	0	6	Final
4	Santos de Guápiles	6	1	2	3	3	7	−4	5	

Source: UNAFUT.com
Rules for classification: 1) points; 2) goal difference; 3) goals scored; 4) head-to-head points; 5) head-to-head goal difference; 6) head-to-head goals scored; 7) draw

==== Positions by round ====
Champions

Team ╲ Round	1	2	3	4	5	6
Pérez Zeledón	1	1	2	1	1	1
Saprissa	3	2	1	2	2	2
Herediano	4	4	3	3	3	3
Santos	2	3	4	4	4	4

==== Results ====
Home \ Away	HER	PEZ	SAN	SAP
Herediano		1–2	2–0	0–1
Pérez Zeledón	1–0		1–0	3–2
Santos	0–2	1–1		0–0
Saprissa	1–0	2–1	1–2	

Updated to match(es) played on 17 December 2017. Source: UNAFUT.com
Legend: Blue = home team win; Yellow = draw; Red = away team win.

=== Apertura finals ===
Since regular season leaders Herediano were unable to top the quadrangular stage, a double-legged final will be played against the quadrangular winner Pérez Zeledón in order to determine the champions of the Apertura tournament. By getting more points in the aggregate table, Herediano will host the second leg.

20 December 2017
20:00 (UTC-6)

Pérez Zeledón	1–0	Herediano
Venegas 15'

Estadio Municipal Pérez Zeledón
Referee: Ricardo Montero

23 December 2017
20:00 (UTC-6)

Herediano	0–0	Pérez Zeledón

Estadio Eladio Rosabal Cordero
Referee: Keylor Herrera

== Season statistics ==
=== Scoring ===
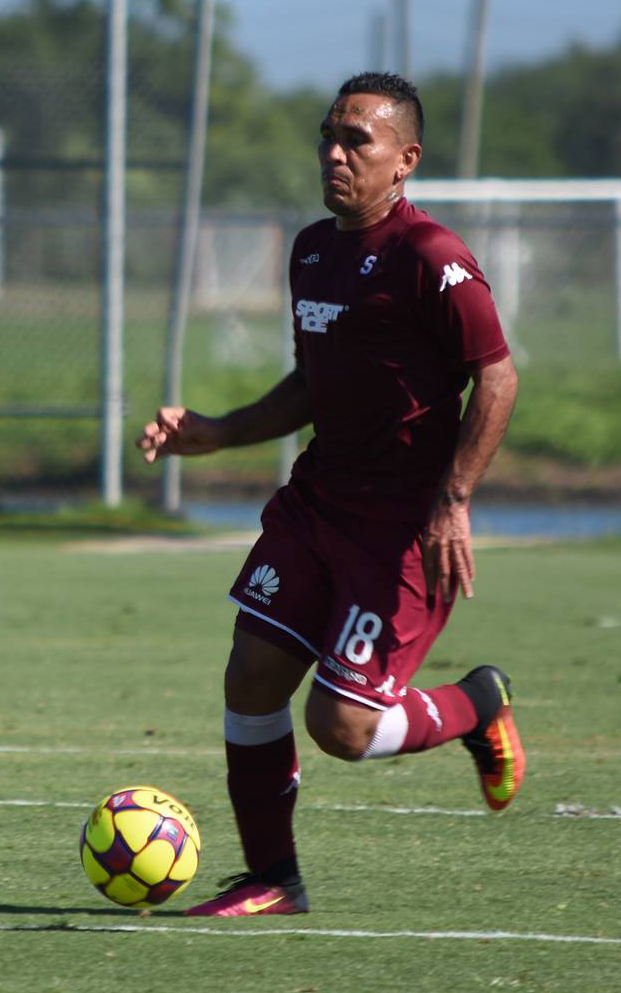
Saprissa's Luis Stewart Pérez scored the first goal of the Apertura tournament

- First goal of the season:
  (Costa Rica) Luis Stewart Pérez for Saprissa against Carmelita (30 July)
- Last goal of the season:
  (Costa Rica) Jeikel Venegas for Pérez Zeledón against Herediano (20 December)

=== Top goalscorers ===
Rank	Player	Club	Goals
1	(Costa Rica) Jonathan McDonald	Alajuelense	15
2	(Costa Rica) Randall Azofeifa	Herediano	10
2	(Costa Rica) Josué Mitchell	Pérez Zeledón	10
4	(Costa Rica) Marvin Angulo	Saprissa	9
4	(Paraguay) Lauro Cazal	Pérez Zeledón	9
4	(Costa Rica) José Guillermo Ortiz	Herediano	9
7	(Costa Rica) Randall Brenes	Cartaginés	8
7	(Costa Rica) Andrey Francis	Limón	8
7	(Mexico) Aldo Magaña	Guadalupe	8
7	(Costa Rica) David Ramírez	Saprissa	8
7	(Costa Rica) Keilor Soto	Pérez Zeledón	8

=== Hat-tricks ===
Player	For	Against	Result	Date	Round	Reference
(Costa Rica) Randall Azofeifa	Herediano	Santos	4–1 (A)	27 September 2017	10	
(Mexico) Julio César Cruz	Herediano	UCR	5–0 (H)	1 November 2017	18	

=== Goalkeeping ===
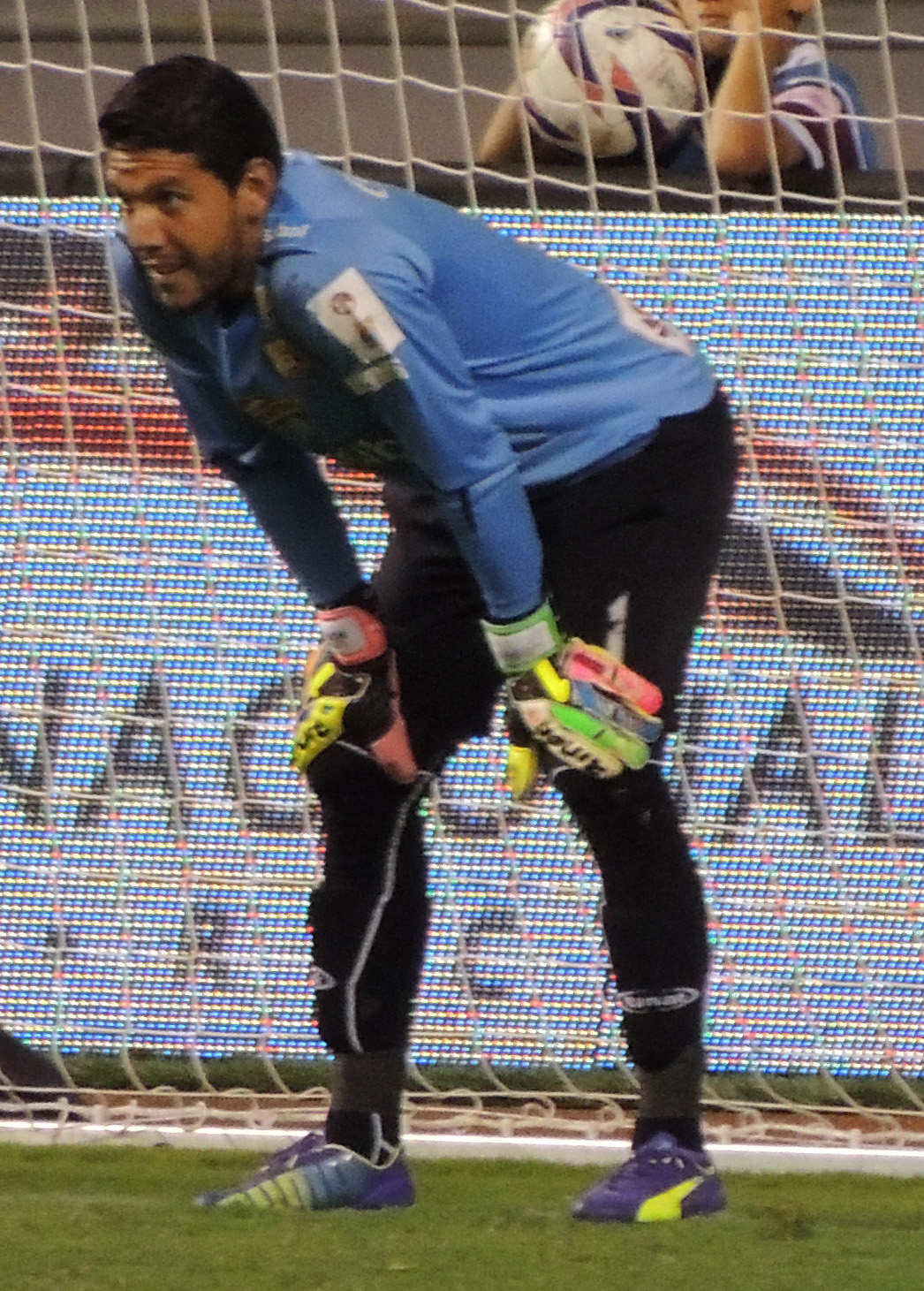
Leonel Moreira's four consecutive clean sheets helped him become the goalkeeper with the most consecutive minutes without receiving a goal in Herediano, and eighth in the history of the league

Rank	Player	Club	Matches	Goals Against	Average
1	(Costa Rica) Leonel Moreira	Herediano	21	11	0,52
2	(Costa Rica) Daniel Cambronero	Herediano	4	3	0,75
3	(Costa Rica) Marco Madrigal	Cartaginés	5	4	0,80
4	(Costa Rica) Kevin Briceño	Saprissa	19	17	0,89
5	(Costa Rica) Bryan Morales	Santos	13	13	1,00
6	(Costa Rica) Luis Carlos Zamora	Carmelita	3	3	1,00
7	(Costa Rica) Carlos Méndez	UCR	17	18	1,06
8	(Costa Rica) Bryan Segura	Pérez Zeledón	19	21	1,11
9	(Costa Rica) Patrick Pemberton	Alajuelense	18	22	1,22
10	(Costa Rica) Alejandro Gómez	Santos	14	18	1,29

=== Foreign players ===
This is a list of foreign players in the 2017 Apertura season. The following players:

1. Have played at least one game for the respective club.
2. Have not been capped for the Costa Rica national football team on any level, independently from the birthplace

A new rule was introduced this season, that clubs can have four foreign players per club and can only add a new player if there is an injury or a player(s) is released and it's before the close of the season transfer window.

Team	Player 1	Player 2	Player 3	Player 4
Alajuelense	(Colombia) Iván Luquetta	(Trinidad and Tobago) Jamille Boatswain	(Saint Lucia) Kurt Frederick	(Brazil) Iago Soares
Carmelita	(Argentina) Cristian Tissone	(Brazil) Anderson Andrade		
Cartaginés	(Argentina) Hernán Fener	(Uruguay) Fabrizio Ronchetti	(Argentina) Nelson González	
Grecia	Team has no foreign players in its squad			
Guadalupe	(Mexico) Aldo Magaña	(Argentina) Lautaro Ayala	(Mexico) César Martínez	
Herediano	(Mexico) Luis Ángel Landín	(Argentina) Jonathan Hansen	(Mexico) Julio César Cruz	
Liberia	(Serbia) Boris Balinovic	(Serbia) Vladimir Vujasinović	(Serbia) Zoran Zec	(Italy) Alessio Lava
Limón	(Colombia) Cristian Rivas	(Venezuela) Jorge Luis Ruiz	(Venezuela) Víctor Pérez	
Pérez Zeledón	(Argentina) Paulo Azcurra	(Paraguay) Lauro Cazal	(Argentina) Luis Aseff	(Argentina) Milton Martínez
Santos	Team has no foreign players in its squad			
Saprissa	(Brazil) Henrique Moura	(Honduras) Jerry Bengtson	(Argentina) Mariano Torres	(Brazil) Anderson Leite
UCR	(Colombia) Mike Campaz	(Colombia) Darío Bustos	(Colombia) Edwards Jiménez	(Colombia) Daniel Ocampo
