= 2025 Club Universidad de Chile season =

Club Universidad de Chile
2025 season
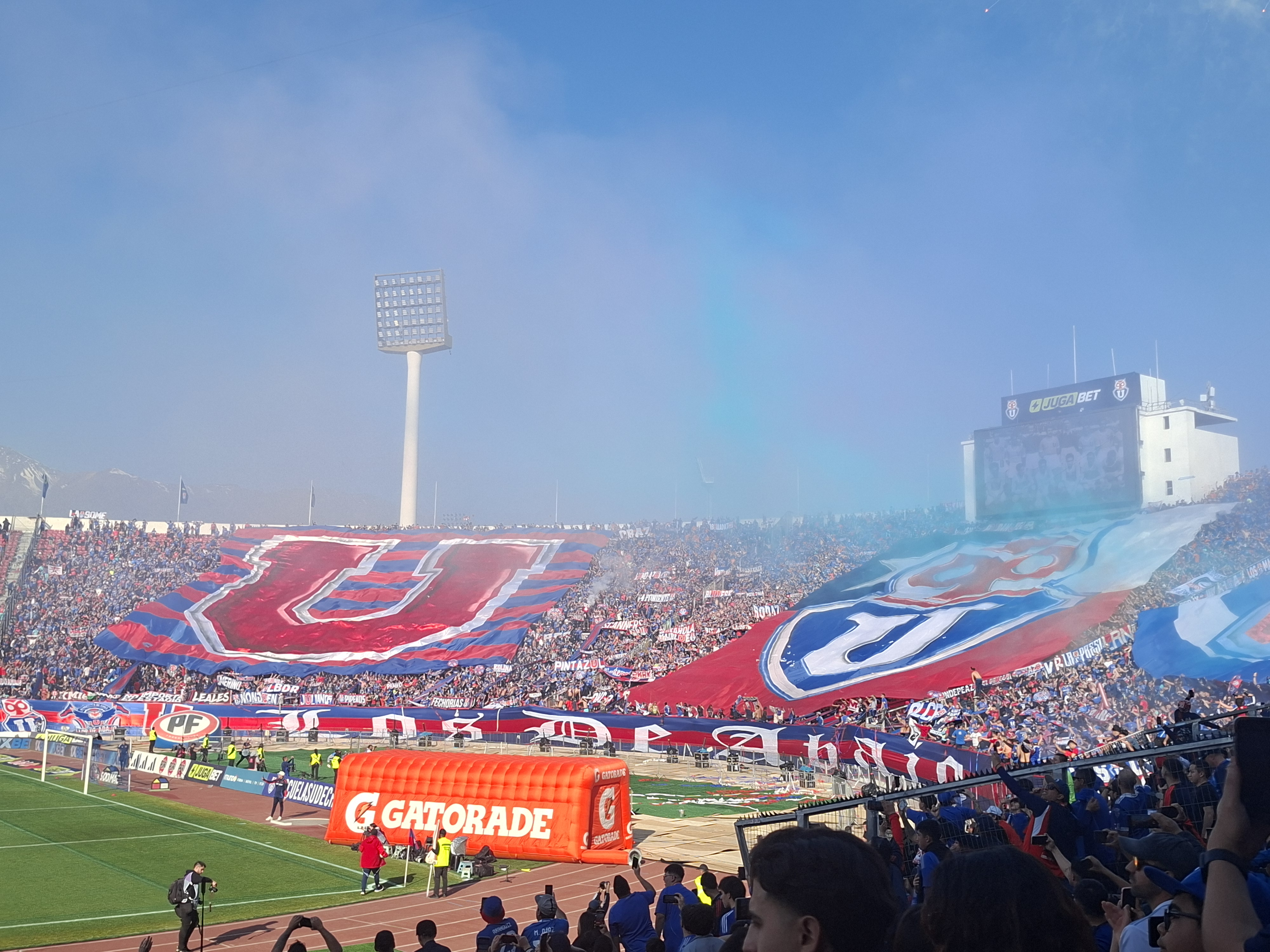
- The Superclásico league match
- Manager: Gustavo Álvarez
- Stadium: Estadio Nacional Julio Martínez Prádanos
- Primera División: 4th
- Copa Libertadores: Group stage
- Copa Sudamericana: Semi-finals
- Copa Chile: Round of 16
- Supercopa de Chile: Champions (2nd title)
- Top goalscorer: League: Rodrigo Contreras (7); All: Rodrigo Contreras; Lucas Di Yorio (7 each)
- Average home league attendance: 29,564
Home colours	Away colours	Third colours

The 2025 season was Club Universidad de Chile's 99th season in existence and their 69th in the Liga de Primera, the top tier of Chilean football. The club also competed in the Copa Chile and the Copa Libertadores.

== Transfers ==
=== In ===
Pos.	Player	Transferred from	Fee	Date	Source
MF	(Uruguay) Gonzalo Montes	(Chile) Huachipato	Undisclosed	4 January 2025	
MF	(Chile) Javier Altamirano	(Argentina) Estudiantes de La Plata	Loan	21 January 2025	
FW	(Argentina) Rodrigo Contreras	(Chile) Deportes Antofagasta	Loan	25 January 2025	
FW	(Argentina) Lucas Di Yorio	(Brazil) Athletico Paranaense	Loan	4 February 2025	
DF	(Argentina) Felipe Salomoni	(Paraguay) Guaraní	Loan	3 July 2025	
MF	(Uruguay) Sebastián Rodríguez	(Uruguay) Montevideo City Torque	Free	31 July 2025	

=== Out ===
Pos.	Player	Transferred to	Fee	Date	Source
FW	(Argentina) Luciano Pons	(Colombia) Atlético Bucaramanga	Free	24 January 2025	
MF	(Uruguay) Gonzalo Montes	(Uruguay) Montevideo City Torque	Loan	31 July 2025	
MF	(Chile) Agustín Arce	(Chile) Deportes Limache	Loan	6 August 2025	
DF	(Chile) José Ignacio Castro	(Chile) Huachipato	Undisclosed	8 August 2025	

== Friendlies ==
11 January 2025 Friendly	Universidad de Chile	4–1	(Argentina) Godoy Cruz

17 January 2025 Friendly	Universidad de Chile	1–2	(Argentina) River Plate

== Competitions ==
=== Overview ===
Competition	First match	Last match	Starting round	Final position	Record							
Competition	First match	Last match	Starting round	Final position	Pld	W	D	L	GF	GA	GD	Win %
Liga de Primera	15 February 2025		Matchday 1		22	12	3	7	45	23	+22	54.55
Copa Chile	29 January 2025	11 June 2025	Group stage	Round of 16	8	4	2	2	16	9	+7	50.00
Copa Libertadores	2 April 2025	27 May 2025	Group stage	Group stage	6	3	1	2	8	6	+2	50.00
Copa Sudamericana	17 July 2025		Knockout round play-offs		6	3	2	1	10	4	+6	50.00
Supercopa de Chile	14 September 2025		Final	Winner	1	1	0	0	3	0	+3	100.00
Total					43	23	8	12	82	42	+40	53.49

Last updated: 8 October 2025
Source: Competitions

=== Liga de Primera ===
==== League table ====
Pos	Team	Pld	W	D	L	GF	GA	GD	Pts	Qualification or relegation
2	Universidad Católica	30	17	7	6	44	26	+18	58	Qualification for Copa Libertadores group stage
3	O'Higgins	30	16	8	6	43	34	+9	56	Qualification for Copa Libertadores second stage
4	Universidad de Chile	30	17	4	9	58	32	+26	55	Qualification for Copa Sudamericana first stage
5	Audax Italiano	30	16	4	10	51	43	+8	52	Qualification for Copa Sudamericana first stage
6	Palestino	30	14	7	9	42	31	+11	49	Qualification for Copa Sudamericana first stage

Source: Campeonato Chileno, Soccerway
Rules for classification: 1) Points, 2) Playoff game (only if needed to decide championship between two teams), 3) Goal difference, 4) Matches won, 5) Goals for, 6) Away goals for, 7) Red cards, 8) Yellow cards, 9) Drawing of lots.

==== Results by round ====
Round	1	2	3	4	5	6	7	8	9
Ground	H	H	A	A	A	A	H	H	A
Result	W	W	L	P	D	L	P	W	W
Position									

Updated to match(es) played on 17 April 2025. Source:
A = Away; H = Home; W = Win; D = Draw; L = Loss

==== Matches ====
15 February 2025 1	Universidad de Chile	5–0	Ñublense	Santiago
20:30 UTC−3	Altamirano 48'; Di Yorio 51', 68'; Fernández (penalty missed) 56', 63'; Guerra 89'	Report	Labrín (yellow card) 18'; Reyes (yellow card) 27'; Esteban Valencia (red card) 37'; Calderón (yellow card) 57'	Stadium: Estadio Nacional Julio Martínez Prádanos; Attendance: 35,345; Referee: Nicolas Millas

23 February 2025 2	Universidad de Chile	1–0	Unión La Calera	Santiago
20:30 UTC−3	Guerra 2'	Report		Stadium: Estadio Nacional Julio Martínez Prádanos; Attendance: 40,167; Referee: Diego Flores

2 March 2025 3	Cobresal	2–1	Universidad de Chile	El Salvador
18:00 UTC−3	Diego Coelho 59'; Yanis 82'	Report	Di Yorio 72'	Stadium: Estadio El Cobre; Referee: José Cabero Rebolledo

14 March 2025 5	Audax Italiano	1–1	Universidad de Chile	Santiago
	Orellana 56'	Report	Di Yorio 40'	Stadium: Estadio Bicentenario de La Florida

27 March 2025 6	Everton	2–0	Universidad de Chile	Viña del Mar
20:30 UTC−3	Campos López (yellow card) 14' (yellow-red card) 51'; Piñeiro 22'; Ibacache (yellow card) 37'; Díaz (yellow card) 37'; R. González (yellow card) 43'; Ramírez (yellow card) 75'; I. González (yellow card) 86'; Medina 87'	Report	Altamirano (red card) 10'; Poblete (yellow card) 27'; Sepúlveda (yellow card) 45+1'; Contreras (yellow card) 61'; Fernández (yellow card) 82'	Stadium: Estadio Sausalito

17 April 2025 8	Universidad de Chile	3–1	Deportes La Serena	Santiago
19:00 UTC−3	Poblete 10'; Aránguiz 45' (pen.); Contreras 80' (pen.)	Report	Henríquez 62'	Stadium: Estadio Nacional Julio Martínez Prádanos

27 April 2025 9	Palestino	2–3	Universidad de Chile	Santiago
15:00	Tapia 69'; Marabel 90+8' (pen.)	Report	Aránguiz 13' (pen.); Fernández 65'; Contreras 90'	Stadium: Estadio Municipal de La Cisterna

3 May 2025 10	Universidad de Chile	1–0	Universidad Católica	Santiago
	Contreras 90+7'	Report		Stadium: Estadio Nacional Julio Martínez Prádanos; Referee: Franco Jimenez

18 May 2025 11	Universidad de Chile	5–1	Huachipato	Santiago
		Report		Stadium: Estadio Nacional Julio Martínez Prádanos

23 May 2025 12	Deportes Limache	2–0	Universidad de Chile	Quillota
	Torrealba 23'; Guerra 89'	Report		Stadium: Municipal Lucio Fariña Fernández

31 May 2025 13	Universidad de Chile	6–0	O'Higgins	Santiago
	Di Yorio 6'; Fernández 24'; Calderón 42'; Zaldivia 75'; Guerra 77'; Assadi 82'	Report		Stadium: Estadio Nacional Julio Martínez Prádanos

15 June 2025 14	Coquimbo Unido	1–0	Universidad de Chile	Coquimbo
		Report		Stadium: Estadio Municipal Francisco Sánchez Rumoroso

21 June 2025 15	Universidad de Chile	3–1	Deportes Iquique	Santiago
	Di Yorio 58'; Contreras 70'; Zaldivia 90+4'	Report	Ramos 24'	Stadium: Estadio Nacional Julio Martínez Prádanos

5 July 2025 4	Unión Española	0–2	Universidad de Chile	Santiago
			Sepúlveda 25'; Assadi 90+7'	Stadium: Estadio Santa Laura-Universidad SEK

12 July 2025 7	Universidad de Chile	2–1	Colo-Colo	Santiago
17:00	Aránguiz 33', 56'	Report	Aquino 39'	Stadium: Estadio Nacional Julio Martínez Prádanos

20 July 2025 16	Ñublense	2–2	Universidad de Chile	Chillán
15:00	Plaza 61'; Rubio 89'	Report	Salomoni 75'; Calderón 81' (o.g.)	Stadium: Estadio Bicentenario Nelson Oyarzún

28 July 2025 17	Unión La Calera	0–4	Universidad de Chile	La Calera
18:00		Report	Assadi 13'; Hormazábal 22'; Contreras 44'; Altamirano 76'	Stadium: Estadio Nicolás Chahuán; Referee: Franco Jimenez

4 August 2025 18	Universidad de Chile	0–1	Cobresal	Santiago
18:00		Report	Coelho 27'	Stadium: Estadio Nacional Julio Martínez Prádanos; Referee: Gastón Phillippe Noriega

9 August 2025 19	Universidad de Chile	4–1	Unión Española	Santiago
15:00	Altamirano 28'; Di Yorio 56'; Assadi 78'; Contreras 84'	Report	Aránguiz 13' (pen.)	Stadium: Estadio Nacional Julio Martínez Prádanos; Referee: Diego Flores Seguel

17 August 2025 20	Universidad de Chile	1–3	Audax Italiano	Santiago
12:30	Di Yorio 86'	Report	Riveros 60'; Vargas 62'; Valencia 90+6'	Stadium: Estadio Nacional Julio Martínez Prádanos; Referee: Piero Maza Gomez

31 August 2025 22	Colo-Colo	1–0	Universidad de Chile	Macul
15:00	Pizarro 81'	Report		Stadium: Monumental; Referee: Cristián Garay Reyes

28 September 2025 23	Deportes La Serena	1–1	Universidad de Chile	La Serena
14:00	Vargas 53'	Report	Di Yorio 86'	Stadium: Estadio La Portada; Referee: Mathias Riquelme Sepulveda

13 October 2025 24	Universidad de Chile	2–1	Palestino	Santiago
15:00	Di Yorio 4', 18'	Report	Meza 32'	Stadium: Estadio Santa Laura; Referee: Miguel Araos Riquelme

26 October 2025 25	Universidad Católica	1–0	Universidad de Chile	Las Condes
11:30	Canales 72'	Report		Stadium: Claro Arena; Referee: Juan Lara Luco

2 November 2025 26	Huachipato	1–0	Universidad de Chile	Talcahuano
10:30	Altamirano 90+9' (pen.)	Report		Stadium: Estadio Huachipato; Referee: Claudio Díaz Mera

5 November 2025 21	Universidad de Chile	2–0	Everton	Santiago
11:30	Fernández 53'; Contreras 90+2'	Report		Stadium: Estadio Santa Laura; Attendance: 10,542; Referee: Gastón Philippe Noriega

=== Copa Chile ===
==== Group stage ====
Pos	Team	Pld	W	D	L	GF	GA	GD	Pts	Qualification	UCH	MAG	SM	REC
1	Universidad de Chile	6	4	1	1	16	5	+11	13	Advance to the knockout stage	—	0–1	3–0	1–1
2	Magallanes	6	4	1	1	7	4	+3	13	Advance to the knockout stage	1–3	—	0–0	2–0
3	Santiago Morning	6	1	2	3	3	8	−5	5		1–3	1–2	—	1–0
4	Deportes Recoleta	6	0	2	4	2	11	−9	2		1–6	0–1	0–0	—

Source: Campeonato Chileno, Soccerway
Legend: Blue = home team win; Yellow = draw; Red = away team win.
Rules for classification: 1) Points; 2) Goal difference; 3) Matches won; 4) Goals for; 5) Away goals for; 6) Red cards; 7) Yellow cards; 8) Copa Chile ranking; 9) Drawing of lots.

29 January 2025 1	Recoleta	1–6	Universidad de Chile	Santiago
19:00 UTC−3				Stadium: Estadio Bicentenario de La Florida

2 February 2025 2	Universidad de Chile	0–1	Magallanes	Santiago
20:30 UTC−3				Stadium: Estadio Nacional Julio Martínez Prádanos

10 February 2025 3	Santiago Morning	1–3	Universidad de Chile	Santiago
				Stadium: Estadio Bicentenario de La Florida

22 March 2025 4	Universidad de Chile	3–0	Santiago Morning	La Serena
17:30 UTC−3				Stadium: Estadio La Portada

5 April 2025 5	Magallanes	1–3	Universidad de Chile	Quillota
17:30 UTC−3				Stadium: Estadio Municipal Lucio Fariña Fernández

11 May 2025 6	Universidad de Chile	1–1	Recoleta
20:00 UTC−4

==== Round of 16 ====
8 June 2025 First leg	Curicó Unido	2–1	Universidad de Chile	Talcahuano
12:30 UTC−4	N. Fernández 32'; Bustamante 41'	Report	L. Fernández 45' (pen.)	Stadium: Huachipato-CAP Acero; Referee: Cristián Galaz

11 June 2025 Second leg	Universidad de Chile	2–2 (3–4 agg.)	Curicó Unido	Ñuñoa, Santiago
18:00 UTC−4	Zaldivia 38'; Assadi 90+1'	Report	Aliaga 46'; N. Fernández 69'	Stadium: Nacional Julio Martínez Prádanos; Referee: Mario Salvo

=== Supercopa de Chile ===
Universidad de Chile was scheduled to face the 2024 Chilean Primera División champions Colo-Colo on 25 January 2025 at Estadio La Portada in La Serena. However, four days before the date the match was scheduled to be played the ANFP announced its suspension as it had not been granted authorization by the Presidential Delegation of the Coquimbo Region to hold the event. On 29 January, ANFP president Pablo Milad confirmed that the Supercopa would change its format and would be contested over two legs, being tentatively rescheduled for July 2025.

14 September 2025	Colo-Colo	0–3	Universidad de Chile	Independencia, Santiago
15:00 UTC−3		Report	Sepúlveda 18'; Guerra 37'; Assadi 50'	Stadium: Estadio Santa Laura; Attendance: 3,000; Referee: Felipe González

=== Copa Libertadores ===
==== Group stage ====
The draw was made on 17 March 2025.

Pos	Team	Pld	W	D	L	GF	GA	GD	Pts	Qualification
1	(Argentina) Estudiantes	6	4	0	2	11	5	+6	12	Advance to round of 16
2	(Brazil) Botafogo	6	4	0	2	8	5	+3	12	Advance to round of 16
3	Universidad de Chile	6	3	1	2	8	6	+2	10	Transfer to Copa Sudamericana
4	(Venezuela) Carabobo	6	0	1	5	2	13	−11	1	

Source: CONMEBOL
Rules for classification: 1) Points; 2) Goal difference; 3) Goals scored; 4) Away goals scored; 5) CONMEBOL ranking.

2 April 2025 1	Universidad de Chile	1–0	(Brazil) Botafogo	Santiago
21:30 UTC−3	Di Yorio 60'	Report	Igor Jesus (yellow card) 90+5' (yellow-red card) 90+6'	Stadium: Estadio Nacional Julio Martínez Prádanos; Attendance: 43,316; Referee: Esteban Ostojich (Uruguay)

8 April 2025 2	Estudiantes (Argentina)	1–2	Universidad de Chile	La Plata, Argentina
21:30 UTC−3	Piovi 3'	Report	Aránguiz 7' (pen.); Zaldivia 10'	Stadium: Estadio Jorge Luis Hirschi; Attendance: 21,954; Referee: Derlis López (Paraguay)

22 April 2025 3	Carabobo (Venezuela)	1–1	Universidad de Chile	Valencia, Venezuela
19:00 UTC−4 (Note: The Carabobo v Universidad de Chile match, scheduled to be played at 18:00 local time, was delayed for one hour due to heavy rainfall.)	Tortolero 22' (pen.)	Report	Aránguiz 43' (pen.)	Stadium: Estadio Misael Delgado; Attendance: 4,012; Referee: Carlos Ortega (Colombia)

7 May 2025 4	Universidad de Chile	0–3	(Argentina) Estudiantes	Santiago
20:00 UTC−4		Report	Palacios 22'; Ascacíbar 31'; Carrillo 39'	Stadium: Estadio Nacional Julio Martínez Prádanos; Attendance: 43,772; Referee: Andrés Rojas (Colombia)

13 May 2025 5	Universidad de Chile	4–0	(Venezuela) Carabobo	Santiago
20:30 UTC−4	Sepúlveda 30'; Aránguiz 65' (pen.); Zaldivia 81'; Poblete 90'	Report		Stadium: Estadio Nacional Julio Martínez Prádanos; Attendance: 45,000; Referee: Bryan Loayza (Ecuador)

27 May 2025 6	Botafogo (Brazil)	1–0	Universidad de Chile	Rio de Janeiro, Brazil
21:30 UTC−3	Igor Jesus 38'	Report		Stadium: Estádio Olímpico Nilton Santos; Attendance: 36,342; Referee: Andrés Rojas (Colombia)

=== Copa Sudamericana ===
==== Knockout round play-offs ====
17 July 2025 First leg	Universidad de Chile	5–0	(Paraguay) Guaraní	Santiago
18:00 UTC−4	Aránguiz 22' (pen.); Altamirano 57'; Assadi 60'; Hormazábal 65'; Guerra 87'	Report		Stadium: Estadio Nacional Julio Martínez Prádanos; Referee: Leandro Rey Hilfer (Argentina)

24 July 2025 Second leg	Guaraní (Paraguay)	2–1 (2–6 agg.)	Universidad de Chile	Asunción, Paraguay
19:00 UTC−3	Torales 84', 89'	Report	Assadi 17'	Stadium: Estadio Defensores del Chaco (Note: Guaraní will play their knockout round play-off home match at Estadio Defensores del Chaco, Asunción instead of their regular stadium Estadio Rogelio Livieres, Asunción which is being rebuilt.)

==== Round of 16 ====
13 August 2025 First leg	Universidad de Chile	1–0	(Argentina) Independiente	Santiago
20:30 UTC−4	Assadi 36'	Report		Stadium: Estadio Nacional Julio Martínez Prádanos; Referee: Anderson Daronco (Brazil)

20 August 2025 Second leg	Independiente (Argentina)	1–1; Abandoned (Note: The Independiente v Universidad de Chile second leg match was abandoned in the 47th minute of play due to lack of security conditions. On 4 September 2025, CONMEBOL's Disciplinary Commission disqualified Independiente from the competition.) (1–2 agg.)	Universidad de Chile	Avellaneda, Argentina
21:30 UTC−3	Montiel 27'	Report	Assadi 11'	Stadium: Estadio Libertadores de América; Referee: Gustavo Tejera (Uruguay)

==== Quarter-finals ====
18 September 2025 First leg	Alianza Lima (Peru)	0–0	Universidad de Chile	Lima, Peru
19:30 UTC−5		Report		Stadium: Estadio Alejandro Villanueva; Referee: Ramon Abatti (Brazil)

25 September 2025 Second leg	Universidad de Chile	2–1 (2–1 agg.)	(Peru) Alianza Lima	Coquimbo, Chile
21:30 UTC−3	Assadi 5'; Altamirano 51'	Report	E. Castillo 64'	Stadium: Estadio Municipal Francisco Sánchez Rumoroso (Note: Universidad de Chile will play their quarter-final home match at Estadio Municipal Francisco Sánchez Rumoroso, Coquimbo instead of their regular stadium Estadio Nacional Julio Martínez Prádanos, Santiago which will be reserved for the 2025 FIFA U-20 World Cup.); Attendance: 0 Referee: Carlos Betancur (Colombia)

==== Semi-finals ====
23 October 2025 First leg	Universidad de Chile	2–2	(Argentina) Lanús	Santiago, Chile
19:00 UTC−3	Di Yorio 63'; Aránguiz 90+9' (pen.)		Castillo 25', 29'	Stadium: Estadio Nacional Julio Martínez Prádanos; Attendance: 0 Referee: Anderson Daronco (Brazil)

30 October 2025 Second leg	Lanús (Argentina)	1–0 (3–2 agg.)	Universidad de Chile	Lanús, Argentina
19:00 UTC−3	Castillo 62'	Report		Stadium: Estadio Ciudad de Lanús; Referee: Alexis Herrera (Venezuela)
