= 2019–20 Liga FPD =

Liga FPD
- Season: 2019–20
- Champions: Apertura: Herediano; Clausura: Saprissa
- Relegated: La U Universitarios
- CONCACAF League: Alajuelense; Herediano; Saprissa
- Top goalscorer: Álvaro Saborío Chacón (13 goals as of 15 December 2019)
- Biggest home win: Saprissa 6–0 Limon FC (21 October 2019)
- Biggest away win: Grecia 0–6 Saprissa (8 September 2019)

The 2019–20 Liga FPD season, also known as Liga Promérica for sponsorship reasons, is the 99th season since its establishment. The tournament is divided into two championships, the Apertura and Clausura, each in an identical format and each contested by 12 teams.

The Voit Loxus is the official match ball of the tournament. San Carlos are the defending champions, after defeating Saprissa in the Clausura 2019 tournament.

== Teams and Structure Changes ==
A total of 12 teams will contest the league, including 11 sides from the 2018–19 season, one team promoted from the Liga de Ascenso.

Jicaral were promoted for the first time to the Liga FPD after defeating Guanacasteca in the Liga de Ascenso final, thus replacing Carmelita in the Liga FPD.

Like the previous season, the league has the following playoff format. The top 4 teams in the regular season will progress to a two-legged knockout tournament. If the same team that wins the regular season wins the playoff, that team wins the season championship immediately. Should a different team win the playoff than won the regular season, those two teams will meet in a two-legged Grand Final for the season championship.

=== Personnel, kits and Stadia ===
Locations of the 2019–20 Costa Rican FPD teams

Note: Table lists in alphabetical order.

Team	Manager	Kit manufacturer	Shirt sponsor(s)	Stadium	Capacity
Alajuelense	(Argentina) Andrés Carevic	Kelme	kölbi	Alejandro Morera Soto	18,000
Cartaginés	(Costa Rica) Hernán Medford	Joma	Premium Carroceria y Pintura	"Fello" Meza	13,500
Municipal Grecia	(Mexico) Fernando Palomeque	Living Sports	Super Rosvil	Estadio Allen Riggioni	4,000
Guadalupe F.C.	(Costa Rica) Géiner Segura	ProSport	Yustin Suministros	Estadio José Joaquín "Coyella" Fonseca	4,500
Herediano	(Argentina) José Giacone	Umbro	Tigo	Eladio Rosabal Cordero	15,000
Jicaral	(Costa Rica) Jeaustin Campos	ProSport	Sardimar	Estadio de la Asociación Cívica Jicaraleña	1,000
Limón	(Costa Rica) Ricardo Allen Thomas	Sportek	APM Terminals	Estadio Juan Gobán	2,600
Pérez Zeledón	(Colombia) Omar Royero	Textiles JB	kölbi	Municipal de Pérez Zeledón	6,100
San Carlos	(Costa Rica) Luis Marín	ARN	Dos Pinos	Estadio Carlos Ugalde Álvarez	5,600
Santos	(Costa Rica) Johnny Chaves	Capelli Sport	Grupo Colono	Ebal Rodríguez	4,500
Saprissa	(Costa Rica) Walter Centeno	Kappa	kölbi	Ricardo Saprissa	24,000
UCR	(Costa Rica) Luis Diego Arnáez	Saeta	TBD	Estadio Jorge Hernán "Cuty" Monge	5,500

== Apertura ==
The Apertura tournament will be played in the second half of 2019, starting on 20 July.

=== Regular season ===
The regular season began on 20 July 2019 and ended on 20 November 2019.

==== Standings ====
Pos	Team	Pld	W	D	L	GF	GA	GD	Pts	Qualification or relegation
1	Alajuelense	22	16	4	2	49	21	+28	52	Advance to Playoffs and (if necessary) Grand final
2	Saprissa	22	12	4	6	50	30	+20	40	Advance to Playoffs
3	Herediano	22	10	5	7	40	23	+17	35	Advance to Playoffs
4	San Carlos	22	9	6	7	40	37	+3	33	Advance to Playoffs
5	Cartaginés	22	9	6	7	31	28	+3	33	
6	Pérez Zeledón	22	7	7	8	24	32	−8	28	
7	Jicaral	22	7	6	9	23	30	−7	27	
8	Guadalupe	22	7	5	10	29	37	−8	26	
9	Limón	22	7	4	11	24	40	−16	25	
10	Santos de Guápiles	22	5	9	8	33	39	−6	24	
11	Grecia	22	5	6	11	26	39	−13	21	
12	UCR	22	4	6	12	23	36	−13	18	

Source: Soccerway
Rules for classification: 1) points; 2) goal difference; 3) goals scored; 4) head-to-head points; 5) head-to-head goal difference; 6) head-to-head goals scored; 7) draw

==== Results ====
Home \ Away	ALA	CART	GRE	GUA	HER	JIC	LIM	PER	SCA	SNT	SAP	UCR
Alajuelense	—	1–1	1–0	2–1	3–2	3–1	3–1	1–1	1–0	2–2	1–2	4–1
Cartaginés	0–4	—	4–1	2–1	1–1	0–1	3–0	2–2	1–0	0–0	1–2	4–3
Grecia	1–3	0–1	—	2–1	2–2	1–0	4–0	0–0	1–1	3–1	0–6	3–3
Guadalupe	1–1	1–0	2–1	—	1–1	1–1	4–3	1–2	2–2	2–4	2–1	1–0
Herediano	0–1	3–0	3–0	2–0	—	1–3	3–2	4–1	3–1	6–2	4–0	0–0
Jicaral	0–2	1–1	2–0	2–0	1–2	—	0–2	1–0	1–1	1–1	2–5	2–0
Limón	1–2	0–2	1–0	2–1	1–0	1–0	—	1–1	3–4	1–0	1–1	1–0
Pérez Zeledón	1–4	1–0	1–1	0–1	1–0	1–1	2–0	—	3–0	2–1	0–1	1–0
San Carlos	3–1	2–4	4–2	3–1	1–0	2–1	2–2	5–2	—	2–2	1–0	1–2
Santos de Guápiles	0–2	2–1	1–1	0–2	1–1	1–1	1–1	4–1	1–3	—	4–0	1–4
Saprissa	2–5	2–2	0–2	4–1	2–1	4–0	6–0	3–0	3–1	2–2	—	4–0
UCR	0–3	0–1	2–1	2–2	0–1	1–2	2–0	1–1	1–1	1–2	0–0	—

Source: Soccerway
Legend: Blue = home team win; Yellow = draw; Red = away team win.
For upcoming matches, an "a" indicates there is an article about the rivalry between the two participants.

=== Playoffs ===
Semifinals
1	Alajuelense	0	3	3
4	San Carlos	0	0	0
2	Saprissa	1	1	2 (4)
3	Herediano	1	1	2 (5)

Finals
1	Alajuelense	0	0	0
3	Herediano	2	0	2

==== Semifinals ====
===== First legs =====
23 November 2019
18:00 (UTC-6)

Herediano	1–1	Saprissa
B. Burke 90+1'		38' A. Robinson

Estadio Eladio Rosabal Cordero
Referee: Ricardo Montero
24 November 2019
16:00 (UTC-6)

San Carlos	0–0	Alajuelense

Estadio Carlos Ugalde Álvarez
Referee: Juan Calderón

===== Second legs =====
30 November 2019
18:00 (UTC-6)

Alajuelense	3–0	San Carlos
M. Ureña 22' 43'; J. McDonald 62'

Estadio Alejandro Morera Soto
Referee: Hugo Cruz
1 December 2019
16:00 (UTC-6)

Saprissa	1–1 (a.e.t.)	Herediano
J. Venegas 33' (pen.)		76' Ó. Granados
Penalties
	4–5

Estadio Ricardo Saprissa Aymá
Referee: Juan Calderón

==== Finals ====
===== First leg =====
4 December 2019
18:00 (UTC-6)

Herediano	2–0	Alajuelense
F. Rodríguez 14' 33'

Estadio Eladio Rosabal Cordero
Referee: Henry Bejarano

===== Second leg =====
8 December 2019
13:00 (UTC-6)

Alajuelense	0–0	Herediano

Estadio Alejandro Morera Soto
Referee: Hugo Cruz

=== Grand final ===
If the regular season winners are unable to win the playoffs, a double-legged final will be played against the playoffs winner in order to determine the champions of the Apertura tournament. The team with the better accumulated record over the regular season and playoffs will host the second leg.

==== First leg ====
15 December 2019
14:30 (UTC-6)

Herediano	1–0	Alajuelense
A. Soto 8'

Estadio Eladio Rosabal Cordero
Referee: Juan Calderón

==== Second leg ====
21 December 2019
16:00 (UTC-6)

Alajuelense	2–1 (a.e.t.)	Herediano
B. Alfaro 73'; J. Moya 76'		87' Y. Ruiz
Penalties
	4–5

Estadio Ricardo Saprissa Aymá
Referee: Henry Bejarano

Apertura 2019 champions

27th title

== Clausura ==
The Clausura 2020 season began in January 2020.

=== Regular season ===
==== Standings ====
Pos	Team	Pld	W	D	L	GF	GA	GD	Pts	Qualification or relegation
1	Saprissa	22	13	6	3	41	24	+17	45	Advance to Playoffs and (if necessary) Grand final
2	Herediano	22	10	10	2	40	21	+19	40	Advance to Playoffs
3	Alajuelense	22	11	7	4	42	26	+16	40	Advance to Playoffs
4	Cartaginés	22	10	5	7	33	35	−2	35	Advance to Playoffs
5	Guadalupe	22	8	9	5	28	22	+6	33	
6	Jicaral	22	8	8	6	33	27	+6	32	
7	San Carlos	22	8	5	9	41	41	0	29	
8	Grecia	22	8	5	9	33	37	−4	29	
9	Pérez Zeledón	22	5	6	11	26	38	−12	21	
10	Santos de Guápiles	21	5	5	11	31	41	−10	20	
11	Limón	21	4	4	13	19	28	−9	16	
12	La U Universitarios	22	4	4	14	27	54	−27	16	

Updated to match(es) played on 10 June 2020. Source: Soccerway
Rules for classification: 1) points; 2) goal difference; 3) goals scored; 4) head-to-head points; 5) head-to-head goal difference; 6) head-to-head goals scored; 7) draw

==== Results ====
Home \ Away	ALA	CART	GRE	GUA	HER	JIC	LAU	LIM	PER	SCA	SNT	SAP
Alajuelense	—	1–1	5–1	3–2	0–0	1–0	6–1	4–1	2–0	3–0	1–0	2–2
Cartaginés	0–2	—	4–3	0–0	1–4	4–2	2–1	1–0	0–3	3–2	2–2	1–2
Grecia	3–1	2–3	—	2–0	0–0	1–0	1–0	0–3	1–0	2–5	1–1	0–3
Guadalupe	3–0	0–0	3–0	—	0–0	1–1	5–0	1–0	3–1	0–2	1–0	2–1
Herediano	3–3	3–0	3–3	0–0	—	1–0	5–2	0–1	1–1	3–3	3–1	4–1
Jicaral	2–2	2–1	1–1	0–0	1–1	—	5–0	2–1	3–1	2–1	6–2	0–3
La U Universitarios	1–2	0–0	0–4	3–0	1–2	2–2	—	2–1	2–0	1–2	1–3	2–0
Limón	1–0	1–2	0–2	0–0	0–2	0–1	3–3	—	1–2	1–2	3–0	0–1
Pérez Zeledón	3–1	0–1	1–4	1–1	0–1	2–0	3–2	1–1	—	0–4	3–3	1–1
San Carlos	1–1	1–3	1–0	2–2	1–3	0–1	2–2	1–1	3–2	—	3–0	0–1
Santos de Guápiles	0–1	1–3	1–0	3–4	1–1	0–0	3–0	~~10 Jun~~	3–1	5–2	—	2–4
Saprissa	1–1	3–1	2–2	3–0	1–0	2–2	3–1	1–0	0–0	5–3	1–0	—

Updated to match(es) played on 10 June 2020. Source: Soccerway
Legend: Blue = home team win; Yellow = draw; Red = away team win.
For upcoming matches, an "a" indicates there is an article about the rivalry between the two participants.

=== Playoffs ===
Semifinals
1	Saprissa	4	2	6
4	Cartaginés	0	3	3
2	Herediano	0	0	0
3	Alajuelense	2	0	2

Finals
1	Saprissa	2	1	3
3	Alajuelense	0	0	0

==== Semifinals ====
===== First legs =====
14 June 2020
11:00 (UTC-6)

Cartaginés	0–4	Saprissa
	Report	Barrantes 63'; Rodríguez 66'; Bolaños 72'; Venegas 90'

Estadio José Rafael Fello Meza Ivankovich, Cartago
14 June 2020
19:00 (UTC-6)

Alajuelense	2–0	Herediano
López 30'; Lassiter 79'	Report

Estadio Alejandro Morera Soto, Alajuela

===== Second legs =====
17 June 2020
17:00 (UTC-6)

Saprissa	2–3	Cartaginés
Bolaños 24', 68'		Hernández 18', 37', 89'

Estadio Ricardo Saprissa Aymá, San José
17 June 2020
20:30 (UTC-6)

Herediano	0–0	Alajuelense

Estadio Eladio Rosabal Cordero, Heredia

==== Finals ====
===== First leg =====
24 June 2020
20:30 (UTC-6)

Alajuelense	0–2	Saprissa
		A. Rodríguez 12'; E. Rodríguez 27'

Estadio Alejandro Morera Soto, Alajuela
Referee: Allen Quiros

===== Second leg =====
29 June 2020
20:30 (UTC-6)

Saprissa	1–0	Alajuelense
Torres 68'

Estadio Ricardo Saprissa Aymá, San José
Referee: Juan Gabriel Calderon

Clausura 2020 champions

35th title

== Aggregate table ==
Pos	Team	Pld	W	D	L	GF	GA	GD	Pts	Qualification or relegation
1	Alajuelense (Q)	44	27	11	6	91	47	+44	92	CONCACAF League preliminary round (Note: As non-champions with the best 2019–20 aggregate record (CRC3).)
2	Saprissa (Q)	44	25	10	9	91	54	+37	85	CONCACAF League round of 16 (Note: As champions (Clausura) with better 2019–20 aggregate record (CRC1).)
3	Herediano (Q)	44	20	15	9	80	44	+36	75	CONCACAF League round of 16 (Note: As champions (Apertura) with worse 2019–20 aggregate record (CRC2).)
4	Cartaginés	44	19	11	14	64	63	+1	68	
5	San Carlos	44	17	11	16	81	78	+3	62	
6	Jicaral	44	15	14	15	56	57	−1	59	
7	Guadalupe	44	15	14	15	57	59	−2	59	
8	Grecia	44	13	11	20	59	76	−17	50	
9	Pérez Zeledón	44	12	13	19	50	70	−20	49	
10	Santos de Guápiles	43	10	14	19	64	80	−16	44	
11	Limón	43	11	8	24	43	68	−25	41	
12	UCR (R)	44	8	10	26	50	90	−40	34	Relegated to Liga de Ascenso

Updated to match(es) played on 10 June 2020. Source: Soccerway
Rules for classification: 1) points; 2) goal difference; 3) goals scored; 4) head-to-head points; 5) head-to-head goal difference; 6) head-to-head goals scored; 7) draw
(Q) Qualified for the phase indicated; (R) Relegated

== List of foreign players in the league ==
This is a list of foreign players in the 2019–20 season. The following players:

1. Have played at least one game for the respective club.
2. Have not been capped for the Costa Rica national football team on any level, independently from the birthplace

A new rule was introduced this season, that clubs can have four foreign players per club and can only add a new player if there is an injury or a player is released and it's before the close of the season transfer window.

Club	Player 1	Player 2	Player 3	Player 4	Former Players
Alajuelense	(Argentina) Facundo Zabala	(Honduras) Alexander López	(Panama) Adolfo Machado		
Cartaginés	(Argentina) Joaquin Aguirre	(Cuba) Marcel Hernández			
Grecia	(Argentina) Leonel Peralta	(Mexico) Aldo Magaña			
Guadalupe	(Argentina) Lautaro Ayala				
Herediano	(Mexico) Diego Gonzalez	(Mexico) Luis Lopez			
Jicaral	(Argentina) Pablo Calderón	(Chile) Carlos Soza			
Limón					
Pérez Zeledón	(Argentina) Pablo Azcurra	(Argentina) Alexis Ramos	(Jamaica) Craig Foster		
San Carlos	(Mexico) Julio Cruz	(Panama) Jorman Aguilar	(Panama) Omar Browne		
Santos de Guápiles	(Jamaica) Javon East	(Nicaragua) Jason Ingram	(Panama) Víctor Griffith	(United States) Chimdum Mez	
Deportivo Saprissa	(Argentina) Mariano Torres	(Nicaragua) Byron Bonilla	(Trinidad and Tobago) Aubrey David		
Universitarios	(Argentina) Hernan Fener	(Paraguay) Pedro Báez	(Paraguay) Renato Mencia		

(player released during the Apertura season) (player released between the Apertura and Clausura seasons) (player released during the Clausura season)
