= 2024–25 Costa Rican Cup =

Tournament details
- Country: Costa Rica
- Dates: 28 July 2024 –
- Teams: 16

The 2024–25 Costa Rican Cup is the 6th staging of the Costa Rican Cup.

The tournament featured all twelve teams from the Liga FPD plus ten sides from the Segunda División de Costa Rica. The format consisted in a knockout tournament, starting from the Preliminary round to the final.

Alajuelense are the defending champions, having won the 2023–24 edition.

== Round dates ==
Round	Dates	Number of fixtures
Preliminary round	28 and 29 July 2024	2
Round of 32	6, 7 and 8 August 2024	8
Round of 16	20, 21 and 22 August 2024	4
Quarter-finals	3 and 4 September 2024	4
Semi-finals	9 and 10 October 2024	2
Final	22 March 2025	1

== Participating teams ==
All twelve teams from the 2024–25 Liga FPD season:

- Deportivo Saprissa
- Herediano
- Alajuelense
- Guanacasteca
- San Carlos
- Municipal Liberia
- Sporting
- Cartaginés
- Pérez Zeledón
- Santos de Guápiles
- Puntarenas
- Santa Ana

Ten teams from the 2024–25 Liga de Ascenso season:

- Quepos Cambute
- Jicaral Sercoba
- Inter San Carlos
- Escorpiones de Belén
- COFUTPA Palmares
- Limón Black Star
- Guadalupe
- Sarchí
- Rosario
- Aguilas

== Preliminary round ==
The four lowest ranked teams (Guadalupe, Sarchí, Rosario and Aguilas) competed in the preliminary round for a place in the round of 32.

Team 1	Score	Team 2
Guadalupe	3–1	Rosario
Sarchí	2–2 (3–4 p)	Aguilas

== Round of 32 ==
The two winners from the preliminary round and the fourteen teams not involved in any CONCACAF competitions compete in this round. The draw was made on 26 July 2024.

Team 1	Score	Team 2
Guadalupe (2)	2–0	Sporting (1)
Aguilas (2)	2–3	Municipal Liberia (1)
Pérez Zeledón (1)	0–1	Quepos Cambute (2)
San Carlos (1)	4–1	Inter San Carlos (2)
Santa Ana (1)	0–0 (5–4 p)	COFUTPA Palmares (2)
Cartaginés (1)	0–1	Escorpiones de Belén (2)
Santos de Guápiles (1)	0–0 (3–1 p)	Limón Black Star (2)
Puntarenas (1)	0–0 (5–4 p)	Jicaral Sercoba (2)

8 August 2024	Guadalupe (2)	2–0	Sporting (1)	San José
(19:00 UTC-6)	Ballestero 58'; Vargas 85'			Stadium: Estadio José Joaquín "Colleya" Fonseca

6 August 2024	Aguilas (2)	2–3	Municipal Liberia (1)	Liberia
(21:00 UTC-6)	Coronado 11'; Calvo 48'		Matarrita 61'; Montenegro 72' (pen.); Madrigal 90+4'	Stadium: Estadio Edgardo Baltodano Briceño

7 August 2024	Pérez Zeledón (1)	0–1	Quepos Cambute (2)	Pérez Zeledón
(18:00 UTC-6)				Stadium: Estadio Municipal Pérez Zeledón

7 August 2024	San Carlos (1)	4–1	Inter San Carlos (2)	Quesada
(15:00 UTC-6)	Azofeifa 36'; McDonald 64' (pen.); Acuña 76'; Sandi 83'		Páez 58'	Stadium: Estadio Carlos Ugalde Álvarez

7 August 2024	Santa Ana (1)	0–0 (5–4 p)	COFUTPA Palmares (2)	Santa Ana
(19:00 UTC-6)				Stadium: Estadio de Piedades de Santa Ana

7 August 2024	Cartaginés (1)	0–1	Escorpiones de Belén (2)	Cartago
(20:15 UTC-6)			Sandoval 39'	Stadium: Estadio José Rafael Fello Meza Ivankovich

6 August 2024	Santos de Guápiles (1)	0–0 (3–1 p)	Limón Black Star (2)	Guápiles
(21:00 UTC-6)				Stadium: Estadio Ebal Rodríguez

7 August 2024	Puntarenas (1)	0–0 (5–4 p)	Jicaral Sercoba (2)	Puntarenas
(18:00 UTC-6)				Stadium: Estadio Lito Pérez

== Round of 16 ==
The eight winners from the Round of 32 compete in this round. The draw was made on 9 August 2024.

Team 1	Score	Team 2
Liberia (1)	1–2	Guadalupe (2)
Puntarenas (1)	3–0	Quepos Cambute (2)
Belén (2)	3–2	Municipal Santa Ana (1)
Santos de Guápiles (1)	0–0 (5–4 p)	San Carlos (1)

21 August 2024	Puntarenas (1)	3–0	Quepos Cambute (2)	Puntarenas
(21:00 UTC-6)	Arias 15', 69'; Villalobos 77'			Stadium: Estadio Lito Pérez

21 August 2024	Escorpiones de Belén (2)	3–2	Municipal Santa Ana (1)	Belén
(21:00 UTC-6)	Cano 9'; Montiel 17'; Fonseca 24' (pen.)		Camareno 73'; Chévez 75'	Stadium: Estadio Polideportivo de Belén

20 August 2024	Santos de Guápiles (1)	0–0 (5–4 p)	San Carlos (1)	Guápiles
(21:00 UTC-6)				Stadium: Estadio Ebal Rodríguez

22 August 2024	Liberia (1)	1–2	Guadalupe (2)	Liberia
(21:00 UTC-6)	Leal 15' (o.g.)		Vargas 38'; Mora 48' (o.g.)	Stadium: Estadio Edgardo Baltodano Briceño

== Quarter-finals ==
The four winners of the round of 16 faced Saprissa, Alajuelense, Herediano and Guanacasteca. The draw was made on 9 August 2024.

Team 1	Score	Team 2
Santos de Guápiles (1)	1–1 (3–2 p)	Saprissa (1)
Guadalupe (2)	2–0	Herediano (1)
Puntarenas (1)	2–1	Guanacasteca (1)
Alajuelense (1)	5–1	Belén (2)

3 September 2024	Guadalupe (2)	2–0	Herediano (1)	Guadalupe
(21:00 UTC-6)	Hudson 73'; Miranda 87'			Stadium: Estadio José Joaquín "Colleya" Fonseca

4 September 2024	Puntarenas (1)	2–1	Guanacasteca (1)	Puntarenas
(19:00 UTC-6)	Barrantes 72' (pen.), 80' (pen.)		Ugalde 30' (pen.)	Stadium: Estadio Lito Pérez

4 September 2024	Alajuelense (1)	5–1	Belén (2)	Alajuela
(21:00 UTC-6)	Navarro 2', 10'; Montero 53'; Pérez 59'; Toril 69'		Fonseca 45+5'	Stadium: Estadio Alejandro Morera Soto

4 September 2024	Santos de Guápiles (1)	1–1 (3–2 p)	Saprissa (1)	Guápiles
(21:00 UTC-6)	Linton 89' (pen.)		Sinclair 90+3'	Stadium: Estadio Ebal Rodríguez
