= Roan Wilson =

Costa Rican footballer (born 2002)

Personal information
- Full name: Roan Roberto Wilson Gordon
- Date of birth: 1 May 2002 (age 24)
- Place of birth: Limón, Costa Rica
- Height: 1.84 m (6 ft 0 in)
- Position: Midfielder

Team information
- Current team: Alajuelense
- Number: 14

Senior career*
Years	Team	Apps	(Gls)
2017–2021	Limón	48	(2)
2021–2022	Municipal Grecia	45	(1)
2023–2025	Gil Vicente	14	(1)
2024–2025	→ Chaves (loan)	26	(0)
2025–2026	Chaves	3	(0)
2026–	Alajuelense	6	(0)

International career^{‡}
2019	Costa Rica U17	5	(0)
2022–2026	Costa Rica	9	(0)
- * Club domestic league appearances and goals as of 20 September 2026 ‡ National team caps and goals as of 22:26, 1 October 2026 (UTC)

Roan Roberto Wilson Gordon (born 1 May 2002) is a Costa Rican professional footballer who plays as a midfielder for Alajuelense and the Costa Rica national team.

== Club career ==
=== Limón FC ===
Wilson began at his hometown club Limón. At 13 he bet his coach a car that he would make it to the professional level. He became one of the young players to earn the most playing minutes at the club. However, after financial mismanagement and relegation the club was unable to function at the same level.

=== Municipal Grecia ===
Wilson was able to join Municipal Grecia on a free transfer in 2021. After a period of time to acclimate, such was Wilson's form that he garnered interest from abroad, and a bid for his services from an unnamed Polish club was turned down in March 2022.

=== Gil Vicente ===
In January 2023 Wilson signed for Portuguese club Gil Vicente on a free transfer.

=== Chaves ===
On 5 July 2024, Gil Vicente sent Wilson on a season-long loan to Liga Portugal 2 club Chaves.

== International career ==
Born in Costa Rica, Wilson is of Jamaican descent. He was called up to the Costa Rica national team for the crucial 2022 FIFA World Cup intercontinental qualifying eliminator match against New Zealand in May 2022, which Costa Rica ultimately won 1–0. He made his senior debut on 3 June 2022 in a match against Panama. He was called up to the final 26-man Costa Rica squad for the 2022 FIFA World Cup in Qatar. At the tournament, he played for a few minutes by entering as a substitute against Germany.

== Career statistics ==
=== Club ===
As of match played 20 September 2026

Appearances and goals by club, season and competition
Club	Season	League			Cup		Continental		Other		Total	
Club	Season	Division	Apps	Goals	Apps	Goals	Apps	Goals	Apps	Goals	Apps	Goals
Limón	2018–19	Liga FPD	2	0	—		—		—		2	0
Limón	2019–20	Liga FPD	19	1	—		—		—		19	1
Limón	2020–21	Liga FPD	25	1	—		—		2 (Note: Appearances in relegation play-offs)	0	27	1
Limón	Total		46	2	0	0	0	0	2	0	48	2
Municipal Grecia	2021–22	Liga FPD	32	1	—		—		—		32	1
Municipal Grecia	2022–23	Liga FPD	13	0	0	0	—		—		13	0
Municipal Grecia	Total		45	1	—		—		—		45	1
Gil Vicente	2022–23	Primeira Liga	5	0	—		—		—		5	0
Gil Vicente	2023–24	Primeira Liga	9	1	3	0	—		—		12	1
Gil Vicente	Total		14	1	3	0	—		—		17	1
Chaves (loan)	2024–25	Liga Portugal 2	26	0	2	0	—		—		28	0
Chaves	2025–26	Liga Portugal 2	3	0	—		—		—		3	0
Alajuense	2026–27	Liga FPD	6	0	—		0	0	4 (Note: Appearances in Canadian Championship)	0	10	0
Career total			140	4	5	0	0	0	6	0	151	4

=== International ===
As of match played 1 October 2026

Appearances and goals by national team and year
National team	Year	Apps	Goals
Costa Rica	2022	4	0
Costa Rica	2023	4	0
Costa Rica	2026	1	0
Total		9	0
