= Aldo Magaña =

Mexican footballer (born 1996)

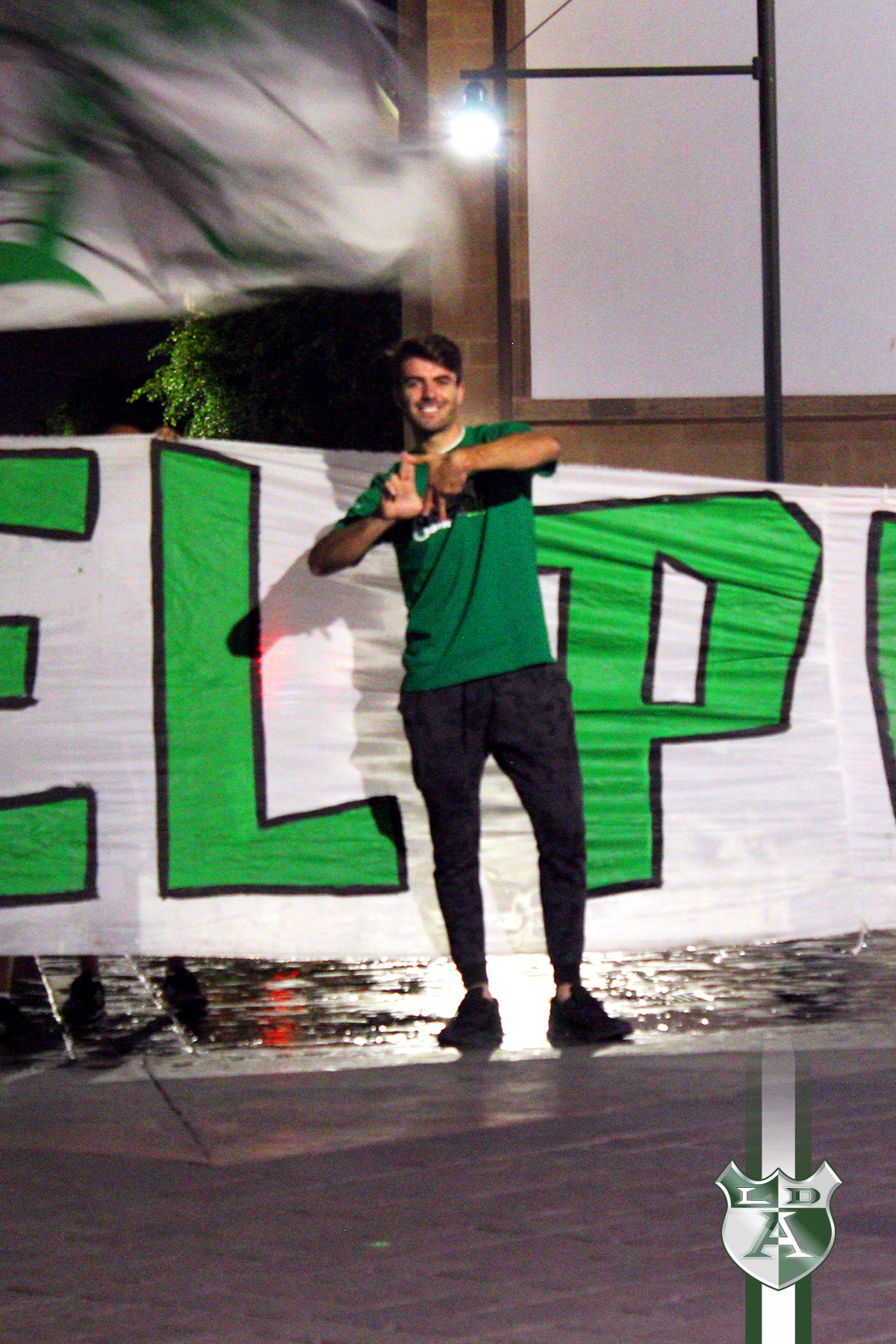
- Magaña in 2016

Personal information
- Full name: Aldo Javier Magaña Padilla
- Date of birth: 8 April 1996 (age 30)
- Place of birth: León, Guanajuato, Mexico
- Height: 1.89 m (6 ft 2 1/2 in)
- Position: Forward

Team information
- Current team: Santos de Guápiles

Youth career
- 2009–2011: Cachorros de León
- 2011–2015: Pachuca
- 2015–2017: León

Senior career*
Years	Team	Apps	(Gls)
2016–2017	León	0	(0)
2017	→ Guadalupe (loan)	19	(7)
2018	→ Celaya (loan)	3	(1)
2018–2019	Herediano	31	(7)
2019	Puebla	0	(0)
2019	Herediano	12	(1)
2020	Grecia	20	(5)
2021	San Carlos	8	(0)
2021	Atenas	5	(0)
2022	Tlaxcala	13	(0)
2022	Jicaral	0	(0)
2023	Guadalupe	0	(0)
2024	Santos de Guápiles	4	(0)
2024–Present	Municipal Limeno	3	(0)
- * Club domestic league appearances and goals as of 10 December 2024

Aldo Javier Magaña Padilla (Note: In this Spanish name, the first or paternal surname is Magaña and the second or maternal family name is Padilla.) (born 8 April 1996) is a Mexican professional footballer who plays as a forward for Municipal Limeno.

== Career ==
=== Youth ===
Magaña first joined Club León youth academy in 2009. He then transferred to Pachuca Youth Academy successfully going through U-15, U-17 and U-20. Magaña then returned to Club León U-20. Before receiving an opportunity to play in Costa Rica with first division team Guadalupe F.C.

==== Guadalupe F.C. (loan) ====
On 2 June 2017, Magaña signed with the Costa Rican club Guadalupe F.C. on a one-year loan to try his luck in a new league. On 6 August 2017, he made his professional debut in the Costa Rica Primera División against Grecia, ending in a 3–0 loss. He managed to score 7 goals in 19 appearances becoming one of the top scorers during the season.

=== Celaya C.D. (loan) ===
On 23 December 2017, Magaña signed with Celaya C.D. to join on a short six months loan in the Liga Ascenso back in Mexico.

== Honours ==
Herediano

- Liga FPD: Apertura 2018, Apertura 2019
- CONCACAF League: 2018
