= José Mora =

José Mora may refer to:

== Art and culture ==
- José de Mora (1638–1725), Spanish sculptor
- José Ferrater Mora (1912–1991), Spanish philosopher
- José Maria Mora (1847–1926), 19th-century Cuban born theatrical photographer

== Politics ==
- José Antonio Mora (1897–1975), Uruguayan lawyer and diplomat
- José Vielma Mora (born 1964), Venezuelan politician
- José Joaquín Mora Porras (1818–1860), Costa Rican politician
- José María Luis Mora (1794–1850), Mexican politician

== Football ==
- José Moreno Mora (born 1981), Colombian footballer
- José Francisco Mora (born 1981), Spanish footballer
- José Mora (footballer, born 1975), Ecuadorian footballer
- José Mora (footballer, born 1992), Costa Rican footballer
