= Juan Ignacio Alfaro =

Costa Rican footballer (born 2000)

Personal information
- Full name: Juan Ignacio Alfaro Monge
- Date of birth: 29 August 2000 (age 26)
- Place of birth: Heredia, Costa Rica
- Height: 1.80 m (5 ft 11 in)
- Position: Goalkeeper

Youth career
- Herediano

College career
Years	Team	Apps	(Gls)
2021–2023	Iona Gaels	39	(0)
2024–2025	Florida Atlantic Owls	11	(0)

Senior career*
Years	Team	Apps	(Gls)
2017–2020	Herediano	3	(0)
2019	→ Guadalupe (loan)	0	(0)
2020	→ Grecia (loan)	1	(0)
2020–2021	Carmelita		
- * Club domestic league appearances and goals as of 21:25, 12 December 2022 (UTC)

Juan Ignacio Alfaro Monge (born 29 August 2000) is a Costa Rican footballer who plays as a goalkeeper.

== Club career ==
=== Herediano ===
Alfaro is a product of C.S. Herediano. In November 2017, Alfaro sat on the bench for the first time in Liga FPD. 18-year old Alfaro got his official debut on 10 October 2018, when goalkeeper Daniel Cambronero was sent off after 67 minutes against Limón FC. Alfaro conceded no goals, although Herediano lost 3–0. Alfaro also started in the following game against Municipal Grecia.

In November 2018, one and a half months after his debut, Alfaro signed a four-year contract extension with Herediano. With the team already having three goalkeepers, Alfaro was loaned out to fellow league club Guadalupe in August 2019 for the rest of the year.

Returning from loan in January 2020, he was loaned out again, this time to Municipal Grecia for the rest of the 2019–20 season. Alfaro played only one game for the club, where he conceded five goals.

=== Carmelita & USA ===
In the summer 2020, Alfaro moved to A.D. Carmelita. In October 2021, Juan Ignacio Alfaro went to the United States on scholarship at Iona College, where he would play for men's soccer team.

== Personal life ==
Juan Ignacio Alfaro is the son of former goalkeeper, Juan Carlos Alfaro, who played for C.S. Herediano in the 90s and played for the club in more than 15 years.

In 2024, he began playing for Florida Atlantic Owls men's soccer.
