= Tristan Demetrius =

Haitian footballer (born 2005)

Personal information
- Date of birth: 8 February 2005 (age 21)
- Place of birth: Port-au-Prince, Haiti
- Height: 1.76 m (5 ft 9 in)
- Position: Forward

Team information
- Current team: Sarchí (on loan from Alajuelense)

Youth career
- 2020–2021: Deportivo Saprissa

Senior career*
Years	Team	Apps	(Gls)
2021–2023	Deportivo Saprissa	2	(0)
2023–2025	Jong Gent	15	(2)
2025–	Alajuelense	10	(0)
2026	→ Guadalupe (loan)	11	(1)
2026–	→ Sarchí (loan)		
- * Club domestic league appearances and goals as of 17 October 2026

Tristan Demetrius (born 8 February 2005) is a Haitian professional footballer who currently plays as a forward for Costa Rican side Sarchí, on loan from Alajuelense.

== Early life ==
Born in the Haitian capital of Port-au-Prince, Demetrius' father died when he was three years old. His mother, Djalanta Brun, worked for the Haitian government in various embassies. Due to his mother's work, Demetrius left Haiti as a child, going on to live in Belgium and the Dominican Republic. As a result, he is multilingual, speaking Dutch, English, French and Spanish. In 2018, he moved to Costa Rica, the country where his maternal uncle, Anghedon Huguens Brun, had played football for Turrialba and Carmelita, as well as being capped by the Haitian national team.

== Club career ==
Initially settling in Cartago, Demetrius trialled with local side Cartaginés, but was ultimately not offered a place in their academy. His other uncle, Shmerley Brun, took him to trial with both Deportivo Saprissa and Alajuelense on the same day, with both clubs showing interest in him. He went on to join the former in 2020, signing a professional contract in December of the same year, at the age of fifteen. Eight months after signing, he extended his deal with the club. He made his professional debut with the side on 16 September 2021, playing sixty minutes in a 1–1 draw with Guanacasteca before being replaced by David Ramírez.

Towards the end of the 2022–23 season, Saprissa announced that they had not ruled out selling Demetrius, who had attracted attention from Belgian Pro League side Gent, having trialled with the side in early 2023. He had not featured at all during the season, due to league rules stating that Costa Rican clubs could only have four registered foreign players, and Saprissa already had Argentine Mariano Torres, Cuban Luis Paradela, Jamaican Javon East and Panamanian Fidel Escobar registered.

On 26 July 2023, Gent confirmed that they had signed Demetrius, stating that he had already trained with the youth team, but had been unable to join in February 2023 due to his age.

== Career statistics ==
=== Club ===
As of 17 October 2026.

Appearances and goals by club, season and competition
Club	Season	League			Cup		Continental		Other		Total	
Club	Season	Division	Apps	Goals	Apps	Goals	Apps	Goals	Apps	Goals	Apps	Goals
Saprissa	2021–22	Liga FPD	2	0	0	0	0	0	0	0	2	0
Saprissa	2022–23	Liga FPD	0	0	0	0	0	0	0	0	0	0
Saprissa	Total		2	0	0	0	0	0	0	0	2	0
Jong Gent	2023–24	Eerste Nationale	15	2	–		–		0	0	15	2
Alajuelense	2024–25	Liga FPD	0	0	0	0	1 (Note: Appearances in the CONCACAF Champions Cup)	0	0	0	1	0
Alajuelense	2025–26	Liga FPD	10	0	0	0	3 (Note: Appearances in the CONCACAF Central American Cup)	0	0	0	13	0
Alajuelense	2026–27	Liga FPD	0	0	0	0	0	0	0	0	0	0
Alajuelense	Total		10	0	0	0	4	0	0	0	14	0
Guadalupe (loan)	2025–26	Liga FPD	11	1	0	0	–		0	0	11	1
Career total			38	3	0	0	4	0	0	0	42	3
