= Juan Alfaro =

Juan Alfaro may refer to:

- Juan Ignacio Alfaro (born 2000), Costa Rican footballer
- Juan Pablo Alfaro (born 1979), Mexican footballer
