= Alberto Toril (footballer, born 1997) =

Spanish footballer

Personal information
- Full name: Alberto Toril Domingo
- Date of birth: 1 June 1997 (age 29)
- Place of birth: Palma de Mallorca, Spain
- Height: 1.87 m (6 ft 2 in)
- Position: Forward

Team information
- Current team: Hércules
- Number: 9

Youth career
- Cala d'Or
- Olimpic
- Serverense
- 2014–2015: Manacor
- 2015–2016: Mallorca

Senior career*
Years	Team	Apps	(Gls)
2015–2018	Mallorca B	1	(0)
2016–2017	→ Sestao River (loan)	13	(0)
2017	→ Arenas Getxo (loan)	14	(2)
2017–2018	→ Olot (loan)	19	(4)
2018–2019	Almería B	32	(4)
2019–2021	Murcia	40	(14)
2021–2023	Piast Gliwice	43	(6)
2023	→ Murcia (loan)	16	(4)
2023–2024	Córdoba	30	(5)
2024–2026	Alajuelense	45	(13)
2026–	Hércules	6	(4)
- * Club domestic league appearances and goals as of 10 June 2026

Alberto Toril Domingo (born 1 June 1997) is a Spanish professional footballer who plays as a forward for Primera Federación club Hércules.

== Club career ==
Born in Palma de Mallorca, Balearic Islands, Toril represented CD Cala d'Or, CD Olimpic, CD Serverense, CD Manacor and RCD Mallorca as a youth. He made his senior debut with the latter's reserves on 1 November 2015, coming on as a second-half substitute for Lima in a 1–0 Tercera División home win over SD Formentera.

On 13 July 2016, after finishing his formation, Toril moved to Segunda División B side Sestao River Club on a one-year loan deal. The following 11 January, after featuring sparingly, he moved to fellow league team Arenas Club de Getxo also in a temporary deal.

On 10 July 2017, Toril joined UE Olot also in the third tier, on loan for one year. Roughly one year later, he moved to another reserve team, UD Almería B in the same category.

On 1 July 2019, after suffering relegation, Toril signed a contract with Real Murcia still in the third division. On 10 June 2021, he moved abroad and joined Polish Ekstraklasa side Piast Gliwice on a three-year deal.

Toril made his professional debut on 25 July 2021, replacing Michał Żyro in a 2–3 home loss against Raków Częstochowa. He scored his first goal on 14 August, netting his team's third in a 4–3 home win over Wisła Płock. On 25 January 2023, he returned to Murcia on loan until the end of the 2022–23 Primera Federación season.

On 14 August 2023, Toril signed for Córdoba CF also in the third division. He scored all three goals of the club in the play-off finals against FC Barcelona Atlètic to help in their promotion to Segunda División.

On 27 June 2024, Toril moved to Costa Rican side Liga Deportiva Alajuelense.

On 2 February 2026, Toril returned to Spain and signed with Hércules in Primera Federación.

== Honours ==
Murcia

- Copa Federación de España: 2019

Alajuelense

- Costa Rican Cup: 2024–25
- Recopa de Costa Rica: 2024
- CONCACAF Central American Cup: 2024
