= Leonel Peralta =

Argentine footballer

Personal information
- Full name: Leonel Héctor Peralta
- Date of birth: 9 July 1992 (age 34)
- Place of birth: Rosario, Argentina
- Position: Defender

Team information
- Current team: Municipal Grecia

Youth career
- Newell's Old Boys
- Olimpo

Senior career*
Years	Team	Apps	(Gls)
2014	General Paz Juniors	13	(0)
2014/2015	Alajuelense	10	(1)
2016/2017	Municipal Pérez Zeledón	7	(0)
- Jicaral
2019	Argentino de Rosario	23	(1)
2019/20-	Municipal Grecia	21	(2)
- * Club domestic league appearances and goals

Leonel Héctor Peralta (born 9 July 1992) is an Argentine footballer.

== Career ==
For the second half of 2014/15, Peralta signed for Costa Rican top flight side Alajuelense from General Paz Juniors in the Argentine fourth division.

In 2016, he suffered an injury which kept him out for a year. Saprissa, Costa Rica's most successful club, helped Peralta recover.

For the second half of 2019/20, he signed for Municipal Grecia in the Costa Rican top flight from Argentine fifth division team Argentino de Rosario.
