= Pablo Calderón =

Argentine footballer (born 1998)

Personal information
- Full name: Pablo Ezequiel Calderón
- Date of birth: 13 May 1998 (age 28)
- Place of birth: Hermoso Campo, Argentina
- Height: 1.76 m (5 ft 9 in)
- Position: Centre-back

Team information
- Current team: Ñublense
- Number: 6

Youth career
- Charata Juniors
- Cooperativista
- 2015–2019: Unión Santa Fe

Senior career*
Years	Team	Apps	(Gls)
2019–2022	Unión Santa Fe	0	(0)
2019–2020	→ Jicaral (loan)	16	(0)
2022	Central Norte	28	(1)
2023	Deportivo Morón	23	(0)
2024–2025	Deportivo Madryn	35	(0)
2025	→ Ñublense (loan)	20	(0)
2026–	Ñublense	0	(0)
- * Club domestic league appearances and goals as of 21 December 025

Pablo Ezequiel Calderón (born 13 May 1998) is an Argentine professional footballer who plays as a centre-back for Chilean club Ñublense.

== Career ==
Calderón, alongside his brother, joined the youth system of Unión Santa Fe from Cooperativista in 2015 following a successful trial. They had previously played in the ranks of Charata Juniors. Four years later, in 2019, he was released by the club. Calderón subsequently headed to Costa Rican football with Liga FPD side Jicaral. He made his senior and professional debut on 19 September 2019 in an away win against Cartaginés. Fifteen further appearances followed across 2019–20. In August 2020, after leaving Jicaral, Calderón rejoined Argentine Primera División outfit Unión Santa Fe; penning a two-year contract.

For the 2024 season, Calderón signed with Deportivo Madryn.

In 2025, Calderón moved to Chile and signed with Ñublense. On 20 December 2025, Ñublense announced his definitive purchase.

== Personal life ==
Calderón is the twin brother of fellow professional footballer Franco Calderón.

== Career statistics ==
As of 28 August 2020.

Appearances and goals by club, season and competition
Club	Season	League			Cup		League Cup		Continental		Other		Total	
Club	Season	Division	Apps	Goals	Apps	Goals	Apps	Goals	Apps	Goals	Apps	Goals	Apps	Goals
Jicaral	2019–20	Liga FPD	16	0	—		—		—		0	0	16	0
Unión Santa Fe	2020–21	Primera División	0	0	0	0	0	0	—		0	0	0	0
Career total			16	0	0	0	0	0	—		0	0	16	0
