= Víctor Griffith =

Panamanian football player (born 2000)

Personal information
- Full name: Victor Alfredo Griffith Mullins
- Date of birth: 12 December 2000 (age 25)
- Place of birth: Panama City, Panama
- Height: 1.74 m (5 ft 9 in)
- Position: Midfielder

Team information
- Current team: Emelec (on loan from St Johnstone)
- Number: 6

Senior career*
Years	Team	Apps	(Gls)
2016–2018	Tauro	2	(0)
2018–2021	Santos Guápiles	43	(0)
2021–2022	Árabe Unido	27	(1)
2022–2023	Portland Timbers 2	41	(1)
2023	Portland Timbers	1	(0)
2024	Árabe Unido	29	(4)
2025–	St. Johnstone	15	(0)
2026–	→ Emelec (loan)	25	(0)

International career^{‡}
2017	Panama U17	5	(0)
2018–2019	Panama U20	10	(0)
2020–	Panama	21	(0)
- * Club domestic league appearances and goals as of 21:14, 13 September 2026 (UTC) ‡ National team caps and goals as of 5 October 2026

Victor Alfredo Griffith Mullins (born 12 December 2000) is a Panamanian professional footballer who plays as midfielder for LigaPro Serie A club Emelec, on loan from Scottish Premiership club St Johnstone, and the Panama national team.

== Club career ==
Griffith made his professional debut with Santos Guápiles in a 4–2 Liga FPD win over Limón on 3 March 2019.

On 10 January 2025, Griffith joined Scottish Premiership club St Johnstone on an eighteen-month contract.

== International career ==
Griffith debuted with the Panama national team in a 1–0 friendly win over Costa Rica on 10 October 2020.

== Career statistics ==
=== Club ===
As of match played 13 September 2026

Appearances and goals by club, season and competition
Club	Season	League			National cup (Note: Includes U.S. Open Cup, Scottish Cup)		League cup		Continental		Other		Total	
Club	Season	Division	Apps	Goals	Apps	Goals	Apps	Goals	Apps	Goals	Apps	Goals	Apps	Goals
Tauro	2016–17	Liga LPF	1	0	—		—		—		—		1	0
Tauro	2017–18	Liga LPF	1	0	—		—		—		—		1	0
Tauro	Total		2	0	—		—		—		—		2	0
Santos de Guápiles	2018–19	Liga FPD	5	0	0	0	—		—		—		5	0
Santos de Guápiles	2019–20	Liga FPD	25	0	0	0	—		—		—		25	0
Santos de Guápiles	2020–21	Liga FPD	13	0	0	0	—		—		—		13	0
Santos de Guápiles	Total		43	0	0	0	—		—		—		43	0
Árabe Unido	2021	Liga LPF	26	1	—		—		—		—		26	1
Árabe Unido	2022	Liga LPF	1	0	—		—		—		—		1	0
Árabe Unido	Total		27	1	—		—		—		—		27	1
Portland Timbers 2	2022	MLS Next Pro	19	0	—		—		—		—		19	0
Portland Timbers 2	2023	MLS Next Pro	22	2	—		—		—		—		22	2
Portland Timbers 2	Total		41	2	—		—		—		—		41	2
Portland Timbers	2022	MLS	0	0	1	0	—		—		—		1	0
Portland Timbers	2023	MLS	1	0	2	0	—		—		—		3	0
Portland Timbers	Total		1	0	3	0	—		—		—		4	0
Árabe Unido	2024	Liga LPF	29	4	—		—		—		—		29	4
St Johnstone	2024–25	Scottish Premiership	11	0	3	0	—		—		—		14	0
St Johnstone	2025–26	Scottish Championship	4	0	0	0	0	0	—		2 (Note: Appearances in Scottish Challenge Cup)	0	6	0
St Johnstone	Total		15	0	3	0	0	0	—		2	0	20	0
Emelec (loan)	2026	LigaPro Serie A	25	0	1	0	—		—		—		26	0
Career total			183	7	7	0	0	0	0	0	2	0	192	7

=== International ===
As of match played 5 October 2026

Appearances and goals by national team and year
National team	Year	Apps	Goals
Panama	2020	4	0
Panama	2021	6	0
Panama	2022	1	0
Panama	2025	4	0
Panama	2026	6	0
Total		21	0

List of international goals scored by Víctor Griffith
No.	Date	Venue	Opponent	Score	Result	Competition
1	3 June 2026	Estadio Rommel Fernández, Panama City, Panama	Dominican Republic	2–0	4–2	Friendly
