= José Mora (footballer, born 1992) =

Costa Rican international footballer

Personal information
- Full name: José Guillermo Mora Campos
- Date of birth: 2 June 1992 (age 34)
- Place of birth: Nicoya, Costa Rica
- Height: 1.74 m (5 ft 9 in)
- Position: Midfielder

Team information
- Current team: San Carlos

Senior career*
Years	Team	Apps	(Gls)
2014–2015	Carmelita	8	(0)
2015–2016	Guanacasteca		
2016–2018	Jicaral		
2018–2019	Municipal Grecia	30	(2)
2019	Herediano	10	(0)
2020–	San Carlos	29	(1)

International career^{‡}
2019–	Costa Rica	1	(0)
- * Club domestic league appearances and goals as of 19:01, 7 June 2021 (UTC) ‡ National team caps and goals as of 11 April 2019 (UTC)

José Guillermo Mora Campos (born 2 June 1992) is a Costa Rican international footballer who plays for San Carlos, as a midfielder.

== Career ==
Born in Nicoya, Mora has played club football for Carmelita, Guanacasteca, Jicaral and Municipal Grecia.

He made his international debut for Costa Rica in 2019.
