= Alessio Lava =

Italian footballer (born 1990)

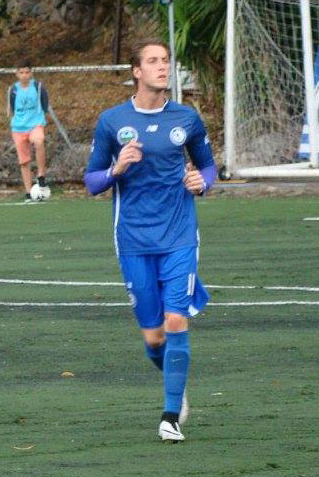
- Alessio Lava in 2017

Personal information
- Date of birth: 25 February 1990 (age 36)
- Place of birth: Italy
- Height: 1.79 m (5 ft 10 in)
- Position: Forward

Team information
- Current team: Meridien Larciano

Senior career*
Years	Team	Apps	(Gls)
–2011	Real Cerretese		
2012–2013	Vaianese		
2013–2014	Rignanese		
2014–2015	Sangiustinese		
2015–2016	Grassina		
2016–2017	Juventud Escazuceña		
2017	Liberia	7	(1)
2018	Curridabat		
2018	Cofutpa		
2019	Uruguay de Coronado		
2019	Nocerina		
2020	Budoni		
2020–2021	Lastrigiana		
2021	Signa		
2022–	Meridien Larciano		
- * Club domestic league appearances and goals

Alessio Lava (born 25 February 1990) is an Italian footballer who plays as a attacker for Meridien Larciano.

== Career ==
Lava started his career with Italian eighth tier side Real Cerretese, helping them earn promotion to the Italian sixth tier within 2 seasons. In 2012, he signed for Vaianese in the Italian sixth tier. In 2013, Lava signed for Italian fifth tier club Rignanese. In 2016, he signed for Juventud Escazuceña in the Costa Rican second tier. In 2017, Lava signed for Costa Rican top flight team Liberia, where he made 7 league appearances and scored 1 goal. On 13 August 2017, he debuted for Liberia during a 4–1 win over Guadalupe. On 13 August 2017, Lava scored his first goal for Liberia during a 4–1 win over Guadalupe.

Before the second half of 2017–18, he signed for Curridabat in the Costa Rican second tier. In 2019, Lava signed for Italian fourth tier outfit Nocerina. In 2020, he signed for Lastrigiana in the Italian fifth tier. Before the second half of 2021–22, he signed for Italian sixth tier side Meridien Larciano.
