= Esteban Ramírez (footballer) =

Costa Rican footballer (born 1987)

Esteban Ramírez Segnini (born 2 February 1987) is a Costa Rican footballer who plays as a midfielder for Municipal Grecia.

== Career ==
Ramírez started his career with Costa Rican top flight side Saprissa, helping them win the league. In 2009, he signed for La U (Costa Rica) in Costa Rica. In 2010, Ramírez signed for Costa Rican top flight club Herediano, helping them win the league.

In 2018, he signed for San Carlos in Costa Rica, helping them win the league, their first major trophy.
