= Franco Calderón =

Argentine footballer (born 1998)

Personal information
- Full name: Franco Ezequiel Calderón
- Date of birth: 13 May 1998 (age 28)
- Place of birth: Hermoso Campo, Argentina
- Height: 1.87 m (6 ft 2 in)
- Position: Centre-back

Team information
- Current team: Independiente (on loan from Universidad de Chile)
- Number: 2

Youth career
- Charata Juniors
- Cooperativista
- 2015–2019: Unión Santa Fe

Senior career*
Years	Team	Apps	(Gls)
2019–2023	Unión Santa Fe	115	(3)
2024–	Universidad de Chile	67	(3)
2026–	→ Independiente (loan)	0	(0)
- * Club domestic league appearances and goals as of 16 August 2026

Franco Ezequiel Calderón (born 13 May 1998) is an Argentine professional footballer who plays as a centre-back for Independiente on loan from Chilean club Universidad de Chile.

== Career ==
Calderón's senior career began with Unión Santa Fe. He previously had youth stints with Charata Juniors and Cooperativista. Leonardo Madelón moved the defender into the first-team set-up in 2018–19, subsequently selecting Calderón to start a Copa de la Superliga first round, first leg at the Estadio La Ciudadela on 13 April 2019; he appeared for the full duration of a 1–1 draw. By the conclusion of 2019–20, Calderón had made thirteen appearances in all competitions for Unión; a period in which he scored his first goal, netting in a Copa Argentina first round defeat to Primera C Metropolitana's Dock Sud.

In 2024, Calderón moved to Chile and joined Universidad de Chile. In August 2026, he was loaned out to Independiente on a deal until December 2027 with a purchase option for the 80% of his rights.

== Personal life ==
Calderón's twin brother, Pablo, is also a professional footballer.

== Career statistics ==
As of 28 August 2020.

Appearances and goals by club, season and competition
Club	Season	League			Cup		League Cup		Continental		Other		Total	
Club	Season	Division	Apps	Goals	Apps	Goals	Apps	Goals	Apps	Goals	Apps	Goals	Apps	Goals
Unión Santa Fe	2018–19	Primera División	0	0	0	0	1	0	0	0	0	0	1	0
Unión Santa Fe	2019–20	Primera División	8	0	1	1	1	0	2 (Note: Appearance(s) in the Copa Sudamericana)	0	0	0	12	1
Career total			8	0	1	1	2	0	2	0	0	0	13	1
