= Israel Poblete =

Chilean footballer (born 1995)

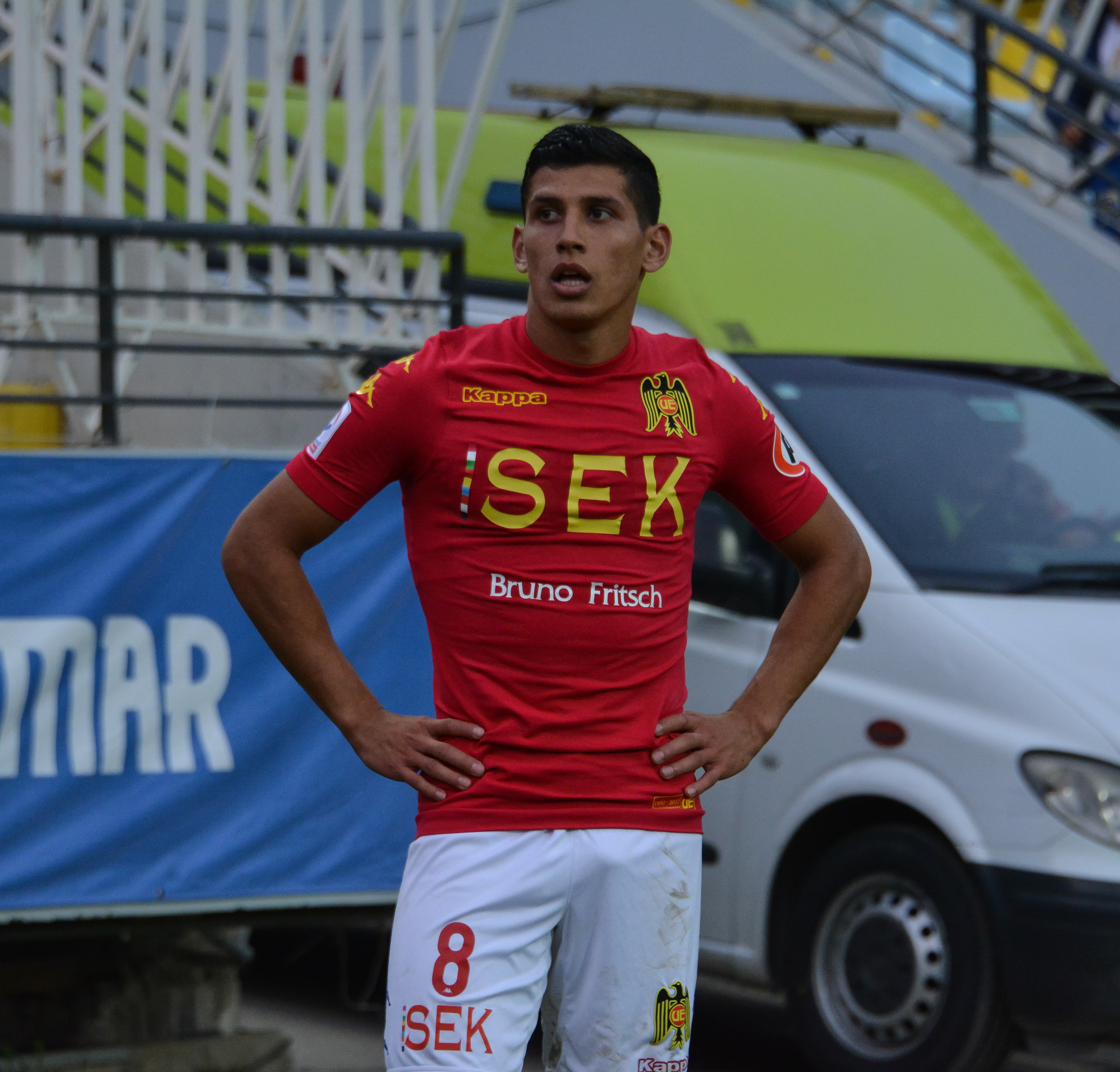
- Poblete with Unión Española in 2018

Personal information
- Full name: Israel Elías Poblete Zúñiga
- Date of birth: June 22, 1995 (age 31)
- Place of birth: Santiago, Chile
- Height: 1.75 m (5 ft 9 in)
- Position: Midfielder

Team information
- Current team: Universidad de Chile

Youth career
- 2010–2014: Cobresal

Senior career*
Years	Team	Apps	(Gls)
2014–2019	Cobresal	64	(6)
2017–2018	→ Unión Española (loan)	42	(2)
2020–2021	Huachipato	29	(1)
2022–	Universidad de Chile	0	(0)
- * Club domestic league appearances and goals as of 21 January 2021

Israel Elías Poblete Zúñiga (born June 22, 1995) is a Chilean footballer who plays as a midfielder for Chilean Primera División club Universidad de Chile.

== Career ==
Poblete was born in Santiago, but began his football career as a youngster with Cobresal, based in the mining town of El Salvador. He made his first-team debut on October 25, 2014, as a second-half substitute in a 3–2 defeat away to Universidad de Concepción in the Primera División, and made four substitute appearances in the 2015 Clausura, including the penultimate fixture of the season in which Cobreloa came back from 2–1 down to beat Barnechea 3–2 and clinch their first Primera title. He played increasingly regularly over the next two seasons, but when Cobresal were relegated in the 2016–17 season, Poblete remained in the top flight, joining Unión Española on an 18-month loan. He appeared in all but one of the 2017 Torneo de Transición matches – half as starter, half as substitute – and contributed to the team's runners-up placing.

== Honours ==
Cobresal

- Chilean Primera División: 2015 Clausura

Unión Española

- Chilean Primera División runner-up: 2017 Torneo de Transición
