= National Insurance Institute =

Autonomous institution in Costa Rica

- Instituto Nacional de Seguros
- National Insurance Institute headquarters building
- Abbreviation: INS
- Formation: October 30, 1924; 101 years ago
- Type: State agency
- Headquarters: Porta Rica
- Products: Insurance
- Website: www.grupoins.com

The National Insurance Institute (Instituto Nacional de Seguros or INS) is an autonomous institution, which was responsible for Costa Rican insurance monopoly in that country until 2008, when insurances were opened to a competitive market.

The agency offers to all people in Costa Rica a wide range of insurance products and services in addition to projecting a strong social benefit programs to people in many different fields.

With close to 100 years of existence, the National Insurance Institute has an obligation to meet the insurance needs of its customers. In addition to selling insurance, it has managed the Fire Department, health services and has joined a network of medical facilities throughout the country.

== History ==
It was created by Act No.12 of October 30, 1924 with the aim of meeting the protection needs of Costa Rican society.

Some of the most renowned statesmen of the period were responsible for its creation including Ricardo Jiménez Oreamuno, President of the Republic on three occasions and Tomás Soley Güell, Secretary of Finance and Commerce, in his third administration.

It began operations as Bank Insurance and in 1948 changed the name to National Insurance Institute.

== Controversies ==
During the period 1999 and 2002 the insurance broker, PWS International Ltd made 41 corrupt payments totalling $1,982,231 to officials employed by INS and the national electricity and telecommunications provider Instituto Costarricense de Electricidad (ICE). As a result, in 2010 a PWS executive was imprisoned in the UK for his part in authorising the corrupt payments.

In December 2011, Aon Corporation, a US insurance brokerage firm headquartered in Chicago, admitted violations of the Foreign Corrupt Practices Act (FCPA) in relation to funds that Aon Corporation had provided to INS officials between 1997 and 2005 for expenses which were not related to a legitimate business purpose, such as travel with spouses to overseas tourist destinations.
