= Luis Aseff =

Argentine footballer

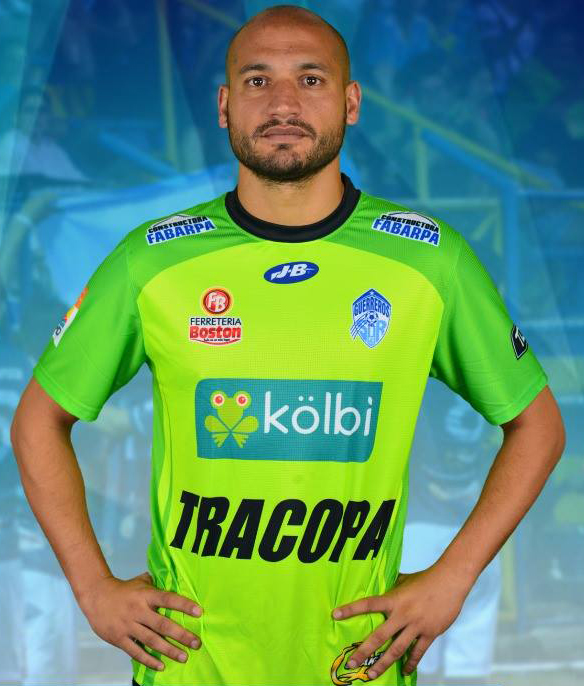
- Aseff with Pérez Zeledón in 2017

Personal information
- Full name: Luis Ignacio Aseff
- Date of birth: 22 September 1983 (age 43)
- Place of birth: San Nicolás de los Arroyos, Argentina
- Height: 1.83 m (6 ft 0 in)
- Position: Goalkeeper

Senior career*
Years	Team	Apps	(Gls)
2005–2008	Unión Santa Fe	57	(0)
2009	Aldosivi	2	(0)
2009–2010	Sportivo Belgrano	27	(0)
2011–2014	Naval	111	(0)
2014–2015	Santiago Morning	26	(0)
2015–2016	Unión San Felipe	30	(0)
2016–2017	Rangers	28	(0)
2017	Pérez Zeledón	6	(0)
2018	Regatas San Nicolás	–	(–)
2019	General Rojo UD	12	(0)
Total		299	(0)
- * Club domestic league appearances and goals

Luis Ignacio Aseff (born 22 September 1983) is a former Argentine footballer who played as a goalkeeper.
