= Rodrigo Contreras =

Argentine footballer

Personal information
- Full name: Rodrigo Nicolás Contreras
- Date of birth: October 27, 1995 (age 31)
- Place of birth: Tucumán, Argentina
- Height: 1.82 m (5 ft 11 1/2 in)
- Position: Striker

Team information
- Current team: Millonarios (on loan from Deportes Antofagasta)
- Number: 27

Youth career
- San Lorenzo

Senior career*
Years	Team	Apps	(Gls)
2013–2019	San Lorenzo	5	(0)
2014	→ Gimnasia LP (loan)	7	(1)
2015	→ Gimnasia LP (loan)	12	(3)
2016	→ Braga B (loan)	6	(0)
2017	→ Quilmes (loan)	10	(0)
2017	→ Arsenal de Sarandí (loan)	10	(1)
2018	→ Deportes Antofagasta (loan)	17	(6)
2019	→ Necaxa (loan)	23	(3)
2019–2021	Aldosivi	21	(4)
2021–2022	Defensa y Justicia	13	(2)
2022	Platense	28	(2)
2023–	Deportes Antofagasta	32	(19)
2024	→ Everton (loan)	25	(16)
2025	→ Universidad de Chile (loan)	24	(9)
2026–	→ Millonarios (loan)	14	(6)

International career
2014–2015	Argentina U20	4	(1)
- * Club domestic league appearances and goals as of 10 December 2025

Rodrigo Nicolás Contreras (born 27 October 1995 in Tucumán), better known as Tucu, is an Argentine footballer who plays as a striker for Colombian club Millonarios on loan from Chilean club Deportes Antofagasta.

== Career ==
In 2024, Contreras joined Chilean Primera División club Everton on loan from Deportes Antofagasta on a one-year deal with an option to buy. The next season, he switched to Universidad de Chile. In 2026, he was loaned out to Colombian club Millonarios.

== Personal life ==
He is the son of Carlos Alberto Contreras, a former footballer who played for clubs such as San Martín de Tucumán, Atlético de Rafaela, among others.

== Honours ==
Argentina U20

- South American Youth Football Championship: 2015
