= Gonzalo Montes =

Uruguayan footballer (born 1994)

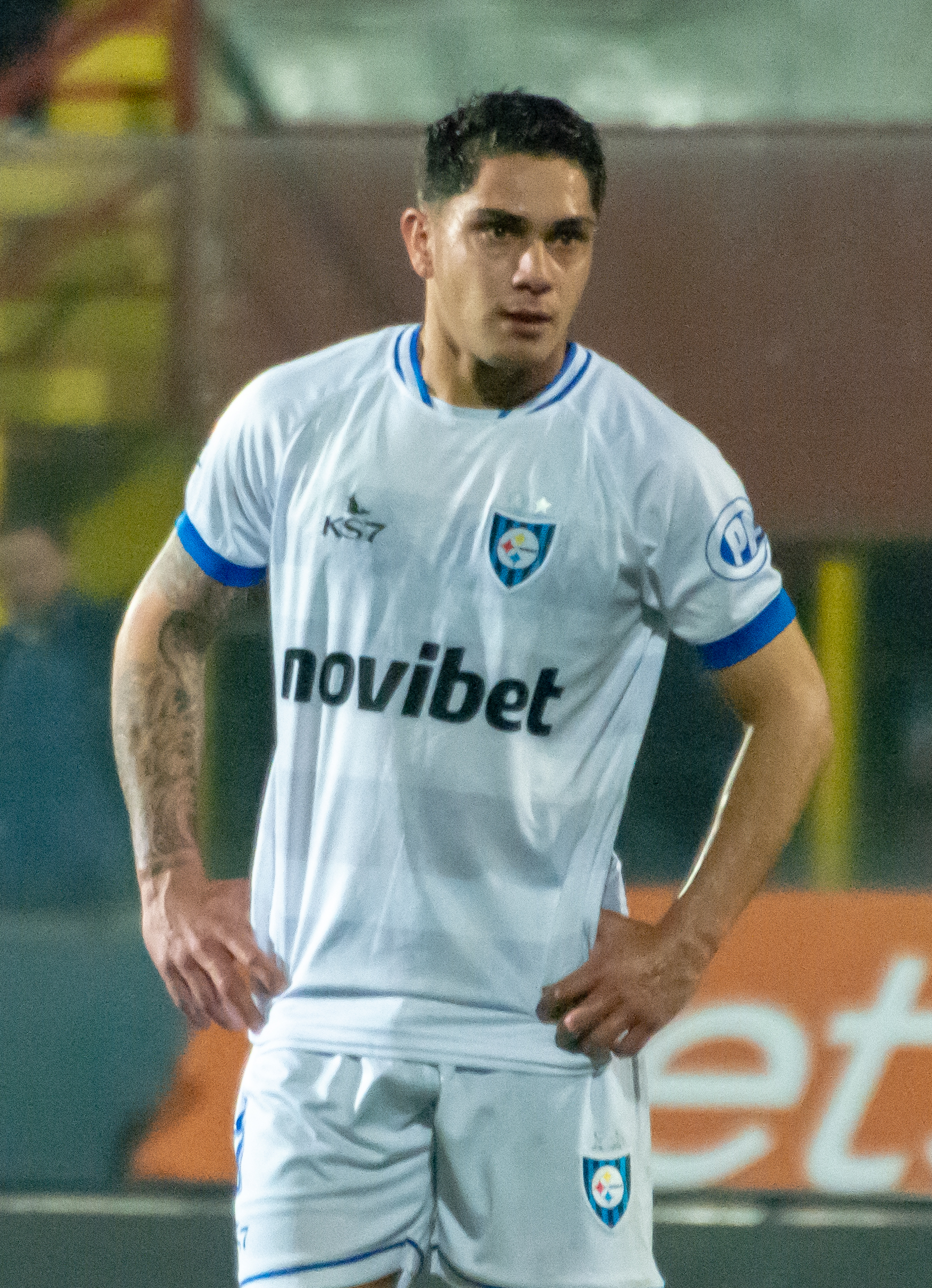

Personal information
- Full name: Gonzalo Montes Calderini
- Date of birth: 22 December 1994 (age 31)
- Place of birth: Montevideo, Uruguay
- Height: 1.74 m (5 ft 8 1/2 in)
- Position: Midfielder

Team information
- Current team: Montevideo City Torque (on loan from Universidad de Chile)
- Number: 20

Youth career
- Cerro

Senior career*
Years	Team	Apps	(Gls)
2012–2015	Cerro	17	(0)
2015–2017	Torque	26	(0)
2017	Cerro Largo	9	(1)
2018	Racing Montevideo	6	(0)
2018–2019	Progreso	29	(3)
2019–2022	Danubio	26	(1)
2020–2021	→ Querétaro (loan)	31	(1)
2021–2022	→ Huachipato (loan)	39	(5)
2023–2024	Huachipato	53	(11)
2025–	Universidad de Chile	11	(0)
2025–	→ Montevideo City Torque (loan)	8	(0)
- * Club domestic league appearances and goals as of 1 October 2025

Gonzalo Montes Calderini (born 22 December 1994) is a Uruguayan professional footballer who currently plays as a midfielder for Montevideo City Torque on loan from Chilean Primera División club Universidad de Chile.

== Career ==
In August 2021, Montes moved to Chile and joined Huachipato.

In January 2025, Montes signed with Universidad de Chile. In July 2025, he was loaned out to Montevideo City Torque on a deal for 18 months.
