= Carlos Soza =

Chilean footballer (born 1990)

Personal information
- Full name: Carlos Andrés Soza Quezada
- Date of birth: 3 January 1990 (age 36)
- Place of birth: Talcahuano, Chile
- Height: 1.75 m (5 ft 9 in)
- Position: Forward

Team information
- Current team: Deportes Copiapó
- Number: 26

Youth career
- Universidad de Chile

Senior career*
Years	Team	Apps	(Gls)
2008–2014	Deportes Copiapó	48	(2)
2010–2012	→ Cobresal (loan)	44	(4)
2014–2015	Lota Schwager	32	(11)
2015–2016	Deportes Iquique	17	(2)
2016–2017	Iberia	23	(8)
2017	Rangers	7	(1)
2018	Deportes Melipilla	2	(0)
2018	Olmedo	15	(3)
2019	Atlético Santo Domingo	34	(7)
2019–2020	Jicaral	14	(1)
2020	Limón	7	(1)
2020	Magallanes	9	(1)
2021–2022	Deportes Copiapó	21	(5)
2023	Deportes Puerto Montt	25	(6)
2024	Deportes Linares	16	(1)
2025–	Deportes Copiapó	5	(0)
- * Club domestic league appearances and goals as of 18 January 2026

Carlos Andrés Soza Quezada (born 3 January 1990) is a Chilean footballer who plays as a forward for Deportes Copiapó.

== Career ==
A product of Universidad de Chile, Soza moved to Deportes Copiapó and made his professional debut in 2008.

In 2018 and 2019, he played in Ecuador for Olmedo and Atlético Santo Domingo.

In 2024, he signed with Deportes Linares in the Segunda División Profesional de Chile.
