= Mariano Torres =

Argentine footballer

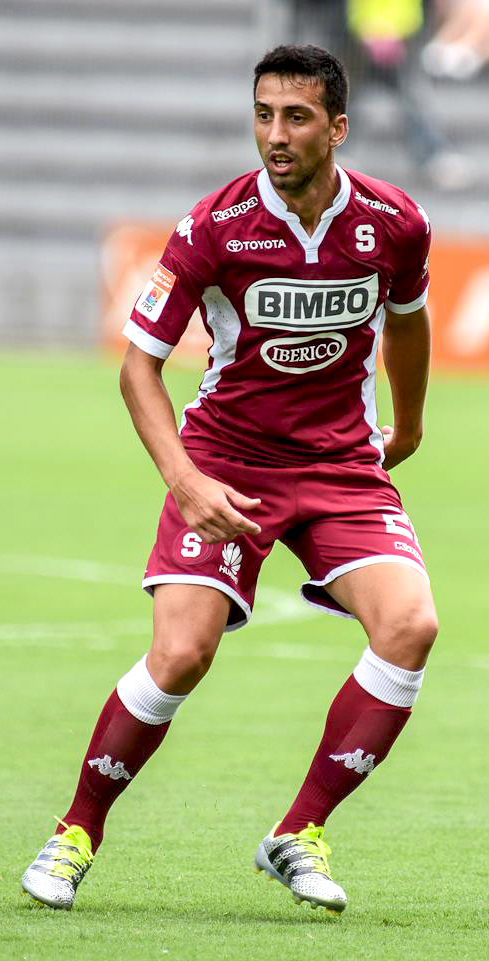
- Torres playing for Saprissa in 2016

Personal information
- Full name: Mariano Néstor Torres
- Date of birth: May 19, 1987 (age 39)
- Place of birth: Buenos Aires, Argentina
- Height: 1.80 m (5 ft 11 in)
- Position: Attacking midfielder

Team information
- Current team: Saprissa
- Number: 20

Youth career
- Boca Juniors

Senior career*
Years	Team	Apps	(Gls)
2007–2009	Boca Juniors	0	(0)
2008	→ LASK Linz (loan)	7	(0)
2008	→ Godoy Cruz (loan)	0	(0)
2009–2010	Corinthians	0	(0)
2009	→ Náutico (loan)	7	(0)
2010	→ Santo André (loan)	4	(0)
2010–2011	Huracán	11	(0)
2012	Boca Juniors	0	(0)
2013–2014	Cobresal	61	(8)
2015	Wilstermann	18	(4)
2015–2016	The Strongest	11	(0)
2016–	Saprissa	373	(73)
- * Club domestic league appearances and goals as of 16:03, 30 January 2025 (UTC)

Mariano Néstor Torres (born 19 May 1987) is an Argentine professional footballer who plays as an attacking midfielder for and captains Liga FPD club Saprissa.

== Career ==
On 8 September 2009 Sport Club Corinthians Paulista signed the Argentinian midfielder. He had previously played for Boca Juniors, LASK Linz and Godoy Cruz.

== Honours ==
Saprissa

- Liga FPD: 2016 Invierno, Clausura 2018, Clausura 2020, Clausura 2021, Apertura 2022, Clausura 2023, Apertura 2023, Clausura 2024
- CONCACAF League: 2019
