= Facundo Zabala =

Argentine footballer

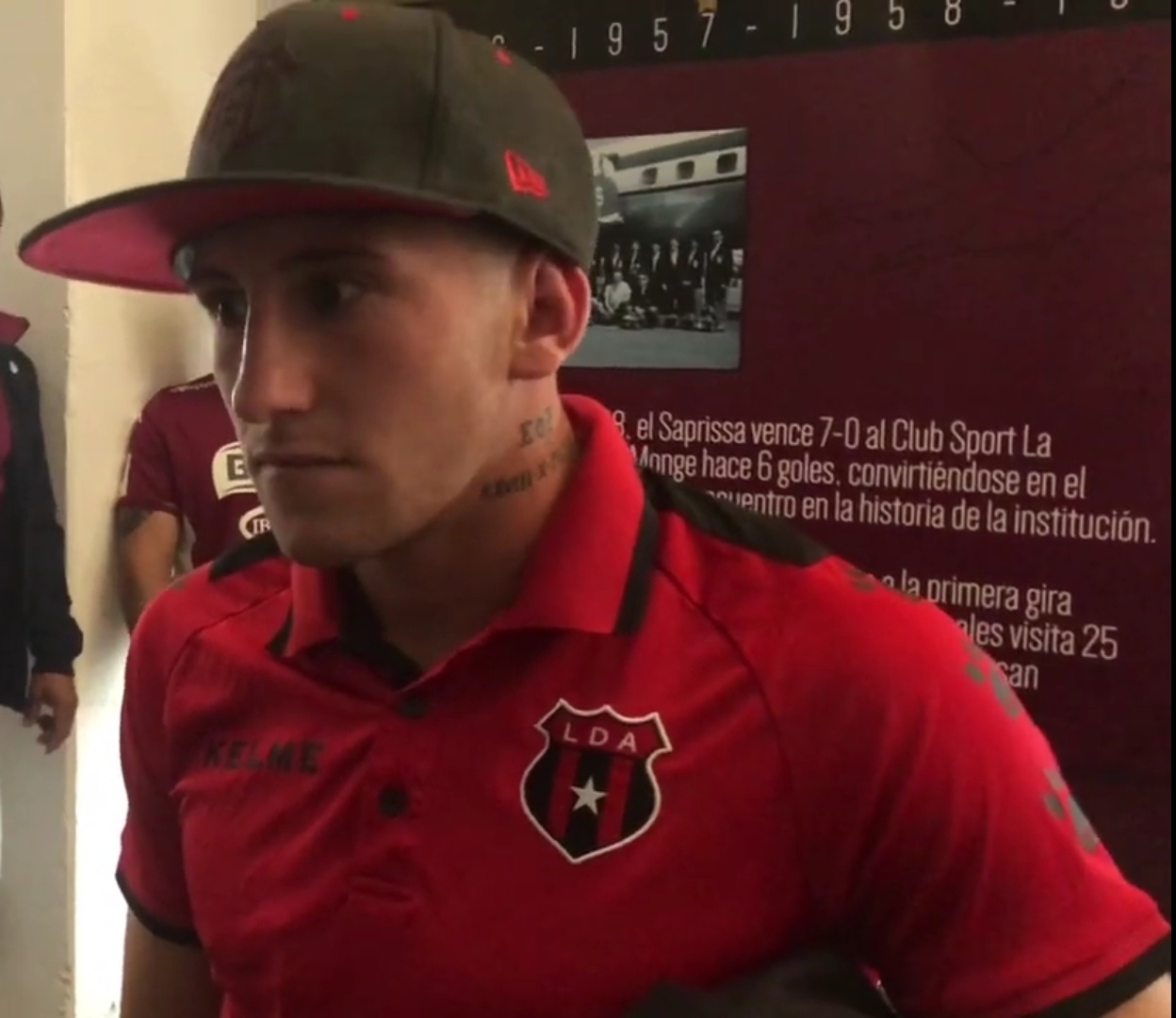
- Zabala in 2020

Personal information
- Full name: Facundo Gabriel Zabala
- Date of birth: 2 January 1999 (age 27)
- Place of birth: Rosario, Argentina
- Height: 1.72 m (5 ft 8 in)
- Position: Left-back

Team information
- Current team: Independiente
- Number: 22

Youth career
- 2018–2019: Rosario Central

Senior career*
Years	Team	Apps	(Gls)
2018–2021	Alajuelense	57	(2)
2021–2022	APOEL	44	(3)
2022–2023	Venezia	1	(0)
2023	→ Olimpia (loan)	39	(2)
2024–2025	Olimpia	51	(1)
2025	→ Al Ain (loan)	0	(0)
2025–	Independiente	26	(0)
- * Club domestic league appearances and goals as of 17:46, 6 June 2026 (UTC)

Facundo Gabriel Zabala (born 2 January 1999) is an Argentine professional footballer who plays as a left-back for Independiente.

== Career ==
In 2017, Zabala almost signed for Italian Serie A side Catania Calcio but the transfer never happened.

For the second half of 2018–19, he signed for Alajuelense in the Costa Rican top flight from the youth academy of Argentine top flight club Rosario Central.

=== APOEL ===
For the second half of the season he joined APOEL making his debut in a 3–1 win against Nea Salamina. He scored his first goal for Apoel in a 1–0 win against rivals AC Omonia sending APOEL to the semi-finals of the cup.

=== Venezia ===
On 1 July 2022, Zabala signed a contract with Italian club Venezia for three seasons, with an option for a fourth. On 10 January 2023, he was loaned to Olimpia in Paraguay until 31 December 2023, with an option to buy. On 8 December 2023, Venezia announced that Olimpia exercised their option to make the transfer permanent, effective in January 2024.
