= Jason Ingram (footballer) =

Nicaraguan footballer

Personal information
- Full name: Jason Telémaco Ingram Oporto
- Date of birth: 10 August 1997 (age 29)
- Place of birth: Bluefields, Nicaragua
- Position: Defender

Team information
- Current team: Santos (Guápiles)

Youth career
- Real Estelí

Senior career*
Years	Team	Apps	(Gls)
-2017	Real Estelí	0	(0)
2017-2018	Juventus (Managua)	32	(0)
2018	Real Estelí	6	(0)
2019-2021	Santos (Guápiles)	56	(0)
2021-2022	Managua	14	(0)
2022-2023	Guanacasteca	24	(0)
2023	Diriangén	1	(0)
2023-	Walter Ferretti	16	(0)

International career
2017-	Nicaragua	7	(0)
- * Club domestic league appearances and goals

Jason Telémaco Ingram Oporto (born 10 August 1997) is a Nicaraguan footballer who plays as a defender for Santos (Guápiles).

== Career ==
Ingram started his career with Nicaraguan side Real Estelí.

Before the second half of 2018/19, Ingram signed for Santos (Guápiles) in Costa Rica, where he received interest from Europe.
