= A.D.R. Jicaral =

Costa Rican football club

Jicaral
- Full name: Asociación Deportiva y Recreativa Jicaral
- Nickname: El Huracán de la Península
- Founded: 1981; 45 years ago
- Ground: Estadio Luis Chochi Briceño, Puntarenas province, Costa Rica
- Capacity: 1,500
- Chairman: Roy Barrantes
- Manager: Mauricio Solís
- League: Liga de Ascenso
- Clausura 2022: 2° - Group A
Home colours	Away colours	Third colours

Asociación Deportiva y Recreativa Jicaral is a Costa Rican football club from the village of Jicaral, Lepanto, Puntarenas, Costa Rica. It was founded in 1981 and currently play in the Primera División de Costa Rica following their promotion in 2019.

Jicaral played in three consecutive promotion playoff matches, losing in 2017 and 2018 to Grecia and San Carlos before defeating Guanacasteca in 2019 to earn promotion.

== Stadium ==
The Civic Association Stadium Jicaraleña is a sports stadium located in the hamlet of Jicarral, Puntarenas, Costa Rica and is the headquarters of Los Local de la Jicar Sercoba. It was inaugurated in 1981 and in 2019 he received several important remodeling in his infrastructure. The stadium is owned by the Jicaraleńa Civic Association and is the headquarters of Jicarral Sercoba, which is located in the Second Division of Costa Rica. It has capacity for 1500 amateurs, natural gramilla. Their gradues are celestial color and account by two sectors of the stadium. In this enclosure, several endings of the second division have been played where the local team achieved its ascent at the top category in 2019 after beating the Sports Association Guanacasteca.

== CIAR ==
The team has the High Performance Integral Center (CIAR), which consists of a total of six hectares. Getting thanks to the sale of the player Freddy Álvarez to the FK SHKUPI team of the First Division of Macedonia. The CIAT has a natural grass gramilla that is by 105 x 70 meters. The new court is natural and equal to that of the institution's stadium. In addition, it has mobile goals for more comfort and professionalism. Containers that will serve as structures to place the utility, medical clinic and gym, which will have everything necessary to enhance players were already placed. All these works are already advanced and this economic amount received will help to continue with all this project, which will have a second floor, which will be rooms for minor leagues and with capacity for 60 people. The mission is that the Nicoya Peninsula looks benefited from the club project and that young people in the region are motivated to join the institution.

== Current squad ==
As of July 31, 2023

Note: Flags indicate national team as defined under FIFA eligibility rules; some limited exceptions apply. Players may hold more than one non-FIFA nationality.

No.	Pos.	Nation	Player
1	GK	CUB	Nelson Johnston
2	DF	CRC	Johansen Baltodano
4	DF	CRC	Jason Prendas
5	DF	CRC	Alonso Chavarría
7	FW	CRC	Kenny Cunningham (captain)
9	MF	CRC	Jeffry Montenegro
12	MF	CRC	Jorman Sánchez
13	MF	CRC	Kevin Patiño
18	DF	CRC	Byron Gutiérrez

No.	Pos.	Nation	Player
19	FW	CRC	Jairo Arrieta
20	DF	CRC	Henry Bermúdez
21	DF	CRC	Lenin Montano
22	GK	CRC	Bryan Cordero
23	MF	CRC	Vilson Liranco
30	MF	CRC	Wagner Vargas
35	GK	CRC	Juan David Prieto
37	FW	MEX	Aldo Magaña
39	FW	PAR	Lauro Cazal
77	MF	CRC	Steven Granados
—	DF	CRC	Rayinder Hernández
