= Guadalupe F.C. =

Costa Rican football club

Guadalupe
- Founded: May 26, 2017; 9 years ago
- Stadium: Estadio José Joaquín "Colleya" Fonseca
- Capacity: 5,500
- Owner: Grupo Somnus
- Chairman: Antonio Abasolo
- Manager: Fernando Palomeque
- League: Liga de Ascenso
- Clausura 2023: 12°
Home colours	Away colours

Guadalupe Fútbol Club is a Costa Rican professional football club that competes in the Primera División de Costa Rica. Based in San José suburb of Guadalupe, the club made their debut in the Liga FPD on July 29, 2017.

Founded in 2017, the team takes over the franchise of Belén F.C. after its owner, Antonio Abasolo, decided to pursue better economic results after poor support received by the former franchise.

On 15 June 2017, Olman Vega resigned from his charge as president of the club. Vega cited inconformity within the club as the reason for his departure.

== History ==
=== Background ===
Through the creation of the Costa Rican First Division championships in 1921, the country's cantons organized their respective teams. The Goicoechea area carried out the foundation of the Club Sport Guadalupe in 1958, dedicated exclusively to the practice of soccer. The team debuted in the top flight in 1980, after having won promotion from the third division, under the name Asociación Deportiva San Miguel. He played two seasons, but was relegated in 1981, until his return in the 1995-96 period. It remained for four more years and played the home games at the José Joaquín "Colleya" Fonseca Stadium, however, it lost the category again. Due to this situation, it disappeared as a representative team of the canton.

=== Appearance as a new franchise ===
As of February 9, 2017, the Belén Fútbol Club team gave a press conference about the change of venue, moving to the José Joaquín "Colleya" Fonseca Stadium in Goicoechea, this after having shared the Rosabal Cordero with Herediano in seasons previous. As a result of the transfer, speculations arose that indicated the change of the Belemite franchise to the Guadalupan zone, in terms of name and uniform. The group from Belén finished its participation in the Summer Championship, a competition in which it saved the category by the score obtained in the accumulated table of the season. Once the sports year was over, the Belemitic president Olman Vega really considered a name change for the franchise. He had Goicoechea Fútbol Club and Guadalupe Fútbol Club as options, leaning more towards the second. He thanked the sponsors that he obtained with Belén on April 24 and began the new project with the team, which has a history apart from its predecessor Club Sport Guadalupe. Working to recover the importance of the region, Luis Fernando Fallas was appointed as the first coach and in addition, the renewed intention of the group attracted local fans and sponsorship interest.

== Stadium ==
José Joaquín "Coyella" Fonseca Stadium is the home ground of Guadalupe. The venue has historically been used by clubs from the Second Division and the First Division of Costa Rica.

He was baptized with the name of Abel Rodríguez Sequeira by Municipal Agreement of the ordinary session of the Council No. 99-74 held on Wednesday, November 6, 1974, which was approved unanimously, firmly, prior opinion of the Commission of Social Affairs, Culture and Sports, in extraordinary session No. 9–74 on Tuesday, October 22, 1974, of the aldermen Zamora Chávez, Jiménez Chavarría, and Molina Molina, that name in homage to the former Municipal Executive of the Municipality of the Canton of Goicoechea, the agreement is in FORCE, it was not executed and the property was named after an outstanding soccer player in the community.

Originally, it was a small sports building with wooden bleachers and natural grass, managed entirely by the municipality of Goicoechea. It was the headquarters of the local soccer team, the Municipal Goicoechea (now disappeared) for several decades, from the 70s to the early 2000s.

The artificial grass acquired regulatory lengths of 105 meters long by 70 meters wide and the stadium has a capacity for 4,000 to 4,500 spectators.

Since December 2009, the Abel Rodríguez Sequeira, Cancha Colleya Fonseca returned to prominence in all categories. Even at the beginning of February 2010, the Senior National Team trained for several days in Guadeloupe. The facilities are rented to amateur teams at all hours of the day.

== Current squad ==
As of 6 April, 2026 Note: Flags indicate national team as defined under FIFA eligibility rules; some limited exceptions apply. Players may hold more than one non-FIFA nationality.

No.	Pos.	Nation	Player
1	GK	CRC	Caleb Arroyo
2	DF	CRC	René Miranda
3	MF	CRC	Nicolás Espino
4	DF	CRC	Kenneth Guzmán
5	DF	CRC	William Quirós
6	MF	CRC	Enmanuel Chacón
7	FW	CRC	John Jairo Ruiz
8	MF	CRC	Sergio Núñez
10	FW	CRC	Elian Morales
11	MF	CRC	Marvin Angulo (Captain)
12	DF	CRC	Keymar McLean (on loan from Herediano)
14	FW	CRC	Harry Rojas
15	MF	HAI	Tristan Demetrius (on loan from Alajuelense)
16	MF	ARG	Lautaro Ayala
19	DF	USA	Shandon Wright
21	DF	CRC	Brandon Bonilla
22	FW	CRC	Jostin Tellería

No.	Pos.	Nation	Player
23	FW	NCA	Brayan López
24	FW	CRC	Lester Ramírez
26	MF	MEX	Héctor Carranza
27	FW	CRC	Axel Amador (on loan from Herediano)
28	MF	MEX	Sergio Gámez
29	MF	NCA	Wilson Villalobos
30	FW	CRC	Jorge Morejón (on loan from Alajuelense)
31	DF	CRC	Kevin Fajardo
32	DF	CRC	Samir Taylor (on loan from Deportivo Saprissa)
33	GK	CRC	Jussef Delgado
34	MF	CRC	Gian Mauro Morera
35	DF	CRC	Greivin Méndez
70	MF	CRC	Paulo Santamaría
77	FW	CRC	Bayron Murcia (on loan from Herediano)
99	GK	CRC	Rodiney Leal
