= Municipal Grecia =

Association football club in Grecia

Grecia
- Nickname(s): La Pantera (The Panther); Los Griegos (The Greeks)
- Founded: August 16, 1998; 26 years ago
- Stadium: Estadio Allen Riggioni
- Capacity: 4,000
- Chairman: Elías Arturo González Molina
- Manager: Pablo Izaguirre
- League: Liga Promerica
- Clausura 2023: 12°
- Website: municipalgrecia.com
Home colours	Away colours

Municipal Grecia is an association football club based in Grecia, Costa Rica. Founded in 1998, the club will make their debut in the Liga FPD after being promoted from the Liga de Ascenso.

The team plays in the Estadio Allen Riggioni.

== History ==
In 1998, the people from Grecia, led by former deputy Everardo Rodríguez, decided to give the people of the canton a new sports option. Feeling the need of having an own football club which competed in a non-amateur level. Having taken over the franchise of American FC, the club was founded on 16 August 1998. The club made its debut on 13 September 1998 by drawing 2–2 with Puriscal FC.

During its first decade, the team won the 2007 Apertura Championship in the Costa Rican Liga de Ascenso. On mid-2017 the club, managed by former Saprissa and Costa Rica captain Walter Centeno, defeated Jicaral to win the 2017 Clausura tournament, thus qualifying to a promotion play-off. Grecia would defeat Jicaral again to achieve the promotion to the Liga FPD for the first time.

== Current squad ==
As of August 9, 2023

Note: Flags indicate national team as defined under FIFA eligibility rules; some limited exceptions apply. Players may hold more than one non-FIFA nationality.

No.	Pos.	Nation	Player
5	DF	(Costa Rica) CRC	Kenner Gutiérrez
8	FW	(Costa Rica) CRC	Ariel Arauz
9	FW	(Costa Rica) CRC	Luis Rodríguez
10	MF	(Costa Rica) CRC	Kadeem Cole
11	MF	(Costa Rica) CRC	Carlos Villegas
12	DF	(Costa Rica) CRC	Josue Meneses
15	DF	(Costa Rica) CRC	Sebastián Suárez
16	MF	(Costa Rica) CRC	Maikel Bermúdez
18	MF	(Costa Rica) CRC	Osvaldo Barrantes
19	DF	(Costa Rica) CRC	Shandon Wright
21	FW	(Costa Rica) CRC	José Guillermo Ortiz

No.	Pos.	Nation	Player
22	DF	(Costa Rica) CRC	Jean Carlo Agüero
23	GK	(Costa Rica) CRC	José Vega
24	DF	(Costa Rica) CRC	Rawy Rodríguez
25	DF	(Costa Rica) CRC	Jean Carlos Sánchez
29	MF	(Costa Rica) CRC	Esteban Ramírez
32	DF	(Costa Rica) CRC	Sebastián Castro
50	GK	(Nicaragua) NCA	Randall Aguinaga
70	DF	(Costa Rica) CRC	Jefferson Rivera
77	FW	(Costa Rica) CRC	Samuel Román
—	MF	(Uruguay) URU	Juan Albín

== Stadium ==
The Allen Riggioni Suárez Municipal Stadium is a sports stadium located in the city of Grecia, Alajuela, Costa Rica. It was inaugurated in 1973 and in 2012 it received several important renovations in its infrastructure. The stadium is home to Municipal Grecia, which is in the First Division of Costa Rica. It has capacity for 4,000 fans, athletic track, natural grass and artificial lighting. Its bleachers are light blue and it counts them for three sectors of the stadium.

Several Second Division finals have been played in this venue, most of which have been won by the local club. It is known as The Panther's Lair because the mascot of the local team (Municipal Grecia) is a Panther. The stadium has also been the alternate venue for the Carmelite Sports Association, in some of its local matches in the First Division.

Situation with the land where the Stadium is located In the municipal administration, period 2010-2016, a problem was unleashed about the place that, for years, the stadium of the city of Greece has occupied. It is recorded in the minutes that the land was acquired and according to reports from the Municipality of Greece the debt was paid in full in 1976, but the land has not been registered in its name for 44 years.

After the death of Mr. Bolaños (previous owner), when the Municipality of Grecia tried to register the land, the succession argued that there was a difference of 5,000 meters of land that should be cancelled.

== Honours ==
- Liga de Ascenso
  - Overall champions: 2016–17
  - Half-season champions: Apertura 2007, Clausura 2017
