= 2024 CONCACAF Central American Cup group stage =

Club football competition

The 2024 CONCACAF Central American Cup group stage was played from 30 July to 29 August 2024. A total of 20 teams competed in the group stage to decide the 8 places in the knockout stage of the 2024 CONCACAF Central American Cup.

== Draw ==
The draw for the group stage was held on 6 June 2024 in Miami, Florida, United States. The 20 involved teams were previously seeded into five pots of four teams each based on their CONCACAF Club Ranking as of 3 June 2024.

Pot 1
Team	Rank
(Costa Rica) Saprissa	41
(Honduras) Olimpia	43
(Costa Rica) Alajuelense	50
(Costa Rica) Herediano	51

Pot 2
Team	Rank
(Guatemala) Municipal	52
(Guatemala) Comunicaciones	54
(Guatemala) Antigua	55
(Honduras) Motagua	56

Pot 3
Team	Rank
(Panama) Tauro	58
(Honduras) Marathón	59
(Panama) Independiente	60
(Costa Rica) Guanacasteca	71

Pot 4
Team	Rank
(Panama) San Francisco	77
(El Salvador) Alianza	80
(Nicaragua) Real Estelí	83
(El Salvador) Águila	86

Pot 5
Team	Rank
(Nicaragua) Diriangén	98
(El Salvador) Firpo	113
(Nicaragua) Managua	146
(Belize) Port Layola	175

For the group stage, the 20 teams were drawn into four groups (Groups A–D) of five containing a team from each of the five pots. Teams from pot 1 were drawn first and were placed in the first position of their group, starting from Group A to Group D. The same procedure was followed for teams from pots 2, 3, 4 and 5, and they were placed in positions 2, 3, 4 and 5, respectively, within the group to which they were drawn. Each group must contain no more than two clubs from the same national association.

The draw resulted in the following groups:

Group A
Pos	Team
A1	(Costa Rica) Herediano
A2	(Honduras) Motagua
A3	(Panama) Tauro
A4	(Panama) San Francisco
A5	(Nicaragua) Diriangén

Group B
Pos	Team
B1	(Costa Rica) Alajuelense
B2	(Guatemala) Comunicaciones
B3	(Honduras) Marathón
B4	(El Salvador) Alianza
B5	(El Salvador) Firpo

Group C
Pos	Team
C1	(Honduras) Olimpia
C2	(Guatemala) Antigua
C3	(Panama) Independiente
C4	(El Salvador) Águila
C5	(Belize) Port Layola

Group D
Pos	Team
D1	(Costa Rica) Saprissa
D2	(Guatemala) Municipal
D3	(Costa Rica) Guanacasteca
D4	(Nicaragua) Real Estelí
D5	(Nicaragua) Managua

== Format ==
In the group stage, each group was played on a single home-and-away round-robin basis, with teams playing against each other once, for a total of four matches per team (two home and two away). The teams were ranked according to the following criteria (Regulations Article 12.10.1):

1. Points (3 points for a win, 1 point for a draw, and 0 points for a loss);
2. Goal difference;
3. Goals scored;
4. If two or more teams are still tied after applying the above criteria, their rankings would be determined as follows:
  1. Head-to-head points in the matches played among the tied teams;
  2. Head-to-head goal difference in the matches played among the tied teams;
  3. Head-to-head goals scored in the matches played among the tied teams;
5. The lowest number of fairplay points, based on the following criteria:
  1. Yellow card: plus 1 point;
  2. Second yellow card/indirect red card: plus 3 points;
  3. Direct red card: plus 4 points;;
  4. Yellow card and direct red card: plus 5 points;
6. Drawing of lots by CONCACAF.

The winners and runners-up of each group advanced to the quarter-finals of the knockout stage.

== Schedule ==
Matches in the competition were played on either Tuesday, Wednesday, or Thursday as decided by CONCACAF. The schedule of each week was as follows (Regulations Article 2).

Weeks	Dates	Matches
Week 1	30 July – 1 August 2024	Team 1 vs. Team 3, Team 5 vs. Team 2
Week 2	6–8 August 2024	Team 5 vs. Team 1, Team 2 vs. Team 4
Week 3	13–15 August 2024	Team 4 vs. Team 5, Team 2 vs. Team 3
Week 4	20–22 August 2024	Team 4 vs. Team 1, Team 3 vs. Team 5
Week 5	27–29 August 2024	Team 1 vs. Team 2, Team 3 vs. Team 4

== Groups ==
All match times are in EDT (UTC−4) and local times are in parentheses, as listed by CONCACAF.

=== Group A ===
Pos	Team	Pld	W	D	L	GF	GA	GD	Pts	Qualification	HER	MOT	DIR	TAU	SFR
1	(Costa Rica) Herediano	4	3	1	0	4	1	+3	10	Advance to Quarter-finals	—	1–1	—	1–0	—
2	(Honduras) Motagua	4	2	1	1	9	6	+3	7	Advance to Quarter-finals	—	—	—	4–1	3–2
3	(Nicaragua) Diriangén	4	2	1	1	4	3	+1	7		0–1	2–1	—	—	—
4	(Panama) Tauro	4	1	0	3	4	8	−4	3		—	—	1–2	—	2–1
5	(Panama) San Francisco	4	0	1	3	3	6	−3	1		0–1	—	0–0	—	—

Source: CONCACAF
30 July 2024
20:00 (18:00 UTC−6)

Diriangén (Nicaragua)	2–1	(Honduras) Motagua
Cano 10'; Copete 89'	Report	Vega 63'

Estadio Cacique Diriangén, Diriamba
Referee: Jaime Herrera (El Salvador)
30 July 2024
22:00 (20:00 UTC−6)

Herediano (Costa Rica)	1–0	(Panama) Tauro
J. Ruiz 52'	Report

Estadio Nacional, San José
Referee: Nelson Salgado (Honduras)

6 August 2024
20:00 (18:00 UTC−6)

Motagua (Honduras)	3–2	(Panama) San Francisco
A. Auzmendi 16', 89'; Santos 37'	Report	Clarke 3'; Zúñiga 48'

Estadio Nacional Chelato Uclés, Tegucigalpa
Referee: Nitzar Sandoval (Nicaragua)
7 August 2024
18:00 (16:00 UTC−6)

Diriangén (Nicaragua)	0–1	(Costa Rica) Herediano
	Report	González 86'

Estadio Cacique Diriangén, Diriamba
Referee: José Torres (Puerto Rico)

13 August 2024
20:00 (18:00 UTC−6)

Motagua (Honduras)	4–1	(Panama) Tauro
Castillo 45'; Y. Mejía 59', 63'; R. Auzmendi 90+2'	Report	Velíz 81'

Estadio Nacional Chelato Uclés, Tegucigalpa
Referee: Victor Rivas (United States)
15 August 2024
18:00 (17:00 UTC−5)

San Francisco (Panama)	0–0	(Nicaragua) Diriangén
	Report

Estadio Universitario, Penonomé
Referee: Karen Hernández (Mexico)

22 August 2024
18:00 (17:00 UTC−5)

Tauro (Panama)	1–2	(Nicaragua) Diriangén
Quintero 74'	Report	Arteaga 59', 90+3'

Estadio Rommel Fernández, Panama City
Referee: Nelson Salgado (Honduras)
22 August 2024
20:00 (19:00 UTC−5)

San Francisco (Panama)	0–1	(Costa Rica) Herediano
	Report	Y. Ruiz 85'

Estadio Universitario, Penonomé
Referee: Jaime Herrera (El Salvador)

28 August 2024
20:00 (19:00 UTC−5)

Tauro (Panama)	2–1	(Panama) San Francisco
Dinolis 58'; Molina 89'	Report	Góndola 73'

Estadio Rommel Fernández, Panama City
Referee: José García Meléndez (El Salvador)
28 August 2024
22:00 (20:00 UTC−6)

Herediano (Costa Rica)	1–1	(Honduras) Motagua
J. Ruiz 54'	Report	Castillo 29' (pen.)

Estadio Nacional, San José
Referee: Drew Fischer (Canada)

=== Group B ===
Pos	Team	Pld	W	D	L	GF	GA	GD	Pts	Qualification	ALA	COM	MAR	ALI	FIR
1	(Costa Rica) Alajuelense	4	4	0	0	11	6	+5	12	Advance to Quarter-finals	—	2–1	3–1	—	—
2	(Guatemala) Comunicaciones	4	2	1	1	5	4	+1	7	Advance to Quarter-finals	—	—	2–1	1–0	—
3	(Honduras) Marathón	4	2	0	2	4	5	−1	6		—	—	—	1–0	1–0
4	(El Salvador) Alianza	4	1	0	3	6	6	0	3		1–2	—	—	—	5–2
5	(El Salvador) Firpo	4	0	1	3	6	11	−5	1		3–4	1–1	—	—	—

Source: CONCACAF
31 July 2024
20:00 (18:00 UTC−6)

Firpo (El Salvador)	1–1	(Guatemala) Comunicaciones
Gustavo 47'	Report	Mejía 13'

Estadio Jorge "El Mágico" González, San Salvador
Attendance: 6,000
Referee: Jorge Leira (Panama)
1 August 2024
20:00 (18:00 UTC−6)

Alajuelense (Costa Rica)	3–1	(Honduras) Marathón
Canhoto 45'; Campos 70', 75'	Report	Bodden 30'

Estadio Alejandro Morera Soto, Alajuela
Referee: Oliver Vergara (Panama)

7 August 2024
20:00 (18:00 UTC−6)

Firpo (El Salvador)	3–4	(Costa Rica) Alajuelense
Vásquez 31', 77'; Gustavo 41'	Report	Campos 21'; Moya 23'; Suárez 33'; Parkins 67'

Estadio Jorge "El Mágico" González, San Salvador
Referee: Julio Güity (Honduras)
7 August 2024
22:00 (20:00 UTC−6)

Comunicaciones (Guatemala)	1–0	(El Salvador) Alianza
Henríquez 83' (o.g.)	Report

Estadio Cementos Progreso, Guatemala City
Referee: Oliver Vergara (Panama)

13 August 2024
22:00 (20:00 UTC−6)

Alianza (El Salvador)	5–2	(El Salvador) Firpo
Monterroza 17'; Mauricio 34'; Rodríguez 37', 60' (pen.); Portillo 54'	Report	Vásquez 77'; Gustavo 78'

Estadio Cuscatlán, San Salvador
Referee: Cristopher Corado (Guatemala)
14 August 2024
22:00 (20:00 UTC−6)

Comunicaciones (Guatemala)	2–1	(Honduras) Marathón
Londoño 17' (pen.); Casas 45+2'	Report	Vega 63'

Estadio Cementos Progreso, Guatemala City
Referee: Filiberto Martínez (El Salvador)

20 August 2024
22:00 (20:00 UTC−6)

Alianza (El Salvador)	1–2	(Costa Rica) Alajuelense
Mauricio 64'	Report	Campos 7', 58'

Estadio Cuscatlán, San Salvador
Referee: Fernando Hernández (Mexico)
21 August 2024
22:00 (20:00 UTC−6)

Marathón (Honduras)	1–0	(El Salvador) Firpo
Ramírez 90+6'	Report

Estadio Olímpico Metropolitano, San Pedro Sula
Referee: Félix Mojica (Nicaragua)

27 August 2024
20:00 (18:00 UTC−6)

Marathón (Honduras)	1–0	(El Salvador) Alianza
Tejeda 66'	Report

Estadio Olímpico Metropolitano, San Pedro Sula
Referee: Filip Dujic (Canada)
27 August 2024
22:00 (20:00 UTC−6)

Alajuelense (Costa Rica)	2–1	(Guatemala) Comunicaciones
Prieto 63' (o.g.); Van der Putten 86'	Report	Casas 59' (pen.)

Estadio Alejandro Morera Soto, Alajuela
Referee: Tori Penso (United States)

=== Group C ===
Pos	Team	Pld	W	D	L	GF	GA	GD	Pts	Qualification	ÁGU	ANT	OLI	CAI	PLA
1	(El Salvador) Águila	4	3	1	0	10	1	+9	10	Advance to Quarter-finals	—	—	2–0	—	5–1
2	(Guatemala) Antigua	4	2	2	0	7	3	+4	8	Advance to Quarter-finals	0–0	—	—	2–1	—
3	(Honduras) Olimpia	4	2	1	1	10	4	+6	7		—	1–1	—	3–0	—
4	(Panama) Independiente	4	1	0	3	2	8	−6	3		0–3	—	—	—	1–0
5	(Belize) Port Layola	4	0	0	4	3	16	−13	0		—	1–4	1–6	—	—

Source: CONCACAF
30 July 2024
18:00 (16:00 UTC−6)

Port Layola (Belize)	1–4	(Guatemala) Antigua
Leslie 33'	Report	Ardón 14', 58', 69'; Ramirez 87'

FFB Stadium, Belmopan
Referee: Nitzar Sandoval (Nicaragua)
1 August 2024
22:00 (20:00 UTC−6)

Olimpia (Honduras)	3–0	(Panama) Independiente
Chirinos 30'; Colombini 78'; Pinto 90+3'	Report

Estadio Nacional Chelato Uclés, Tegucigalpa
Referee: Ricangel de Leça (Aruba)

6 August 2024
22:00 (20:00 UTC−6)

Antigua (Guatemala)	0–0	(El Salvador) Águila
	Report

Estadio Pensativo, Antigua Guatemala
Referee: José Valladares (Honduras)
8 August 2024
20:00 (18:00 UTC−6)

Port Layola (Belize)	1–6	(Honduras) Olimpia
Orozco 22'	Report	Pinto 16'; Arboleda 39'; Rodríguez 59'; Benguché 61'; Solano 77'; Figueroa 90+1'

FFB Stadium, Belmopan
Referee: Norberto da Silva (Curaçao)

13 August 2024
18:00 (16:00 UTC−6)

Antigua (Guatemala)	2–1	(Panama) Independiente
Gómez 49'; Romario 81'	Report	Ruíz 26'

Estadio Pensativo, Antigua Guatemala
Referee: Carly Shaw-MacLaren (Canada)
14 August 2024
18:00 (16:00 UTC−6)

Águila (El Salvador)	5–1	(Belize) Port Layola
Machado 4', 18'; Salazar 35', 37'; Díaz 67'	Report	Garcia 34'

Estadio Las Delicias, Santa Tecla
Referee: Fernando Morón (Panama)

21 August 2024
18:00 (17:00 UTC−5)

Independiente (Panama)	1–0	(Belize) Port Layola
Modelo 84'	Report

Estadio Rommel Fernández, Panama City
Referee: Katia García (Mexico)
22 August 2024
22:00 (20:00 UTC−6)

Águila (El Salvador)	2–0	(Honduras) Olimpia
Cartagena 53'; Rivas 90+4'	Report

Estadio Cuscatlán, San Salvador
Referee: David Gómez (Costa Rica)

29 August 2024
20:00 (19:00 UTC−5)

Independiente (Panama)	0–3	(El Salvador) Águila
	Report	Rodríguez 58'; Sosa 78'; Cerén 80'

Estadio Rommel Fernández, Panama City
Referee: Raúl Castro Zúñiga (Honduras)
29 August 2024
22:00 (20:00 UTC−6)

Olimpia (Honduras)	1–1	(Guatemala) Antigua
Solano 48'	Report	Gómez 53'

Estadio Nacional Chelato Uclés, Tegucigalpa
Referee: Kwinsi Williams (Trinidad and Tobago)

=== Group D ===
Pos	Team	Pld	W	D	L	GF	GA	GD	Pts	Qualification	SAP	EST	MUN	MAN	GUA
1	(Costa Rica) Saprissa	4	3	0	1	10	4	+6	9	Advance to Quarter-finals	—	—	1–0	—	5–0
2	(Nicaragua) Real Estelí	4	2	1	1	6	3	+3	7	Advance to Quarter-finals	2–1	—	—	3–0	—
3	(Guatemala) Municipal	4	1	1	2	4	4	0	4		—	1–1	—	—	3–1
4	(Nicaragua) Managua	4	1	1	2	4	7	−3	4		2–3	—	1–0	—	—
5	(Costa Rica) Guanacasteca	4	1	1	2	3	9	−6	4		—	1–0	—	1–1	—

Source: CONCACAF
31 July 2024
18:00 (16:00 UTC−6)

Managua (Nicaragua)	1–0	(Guatemala) Municipal
Bonilla 65'	Report

Estadio Nacional, Managua
Referee: Raúl Castro Zuniga (Honduras)
31 July 2024
22:00 (20:00 UTC−6)

Saprissa (Costa Rica)	5–0	(Costa Rica) Guanacasteca
East 1'; Díaz 27'; Sinclair 45+1'; Brenes 70'; Torres 84'	Report

Estadio Ricardo Saprissa Aymá, San Juan de Tibás
Referee: Félix Mojica (Nicaragua)

6 August 2024
18:00 (16:00 UTC−6)

Managua (Nicaragua)	2–3	(Costa Rica) Saprissa
Morillo 30'; Barrera 43'	Report	East 39'; Brenes 74'; López 90+10' (o.g.)

Estadio Nacional, Managua
Referee: Kimbell Ward (Saint Kitts and Nevis)
8 August 2024
22:00 (20:00 UTC−6)

Municipal (Guatemala)	1–1	(Nicaragua) Real Estelí
Altán 34'	Report	Medina 90+5'

Estadio Pensativo, Antigua Guatemala
Referee: José García Melendez (El Salvador)

14 August 2024
20:00 (18:00 UTC−6)

Real Estelí (Nicaragua)	3–0	(Nicaragua) Managua
Acevedo 5'; Quijano 41'; Vieyra 76'	Report

Estadio Independencia, Estelí
Referee: Steven Madrigal (Costa Rica)
15 August 2024
22:00 (20:00 UTC−6)

Municipal (Guatemala)	3–1	(Costa Rica) Guanacasteca
Barrientos 16'; Monreal 64' (o.g.); Martínez 90+6'	Report	Córdoba 51'

Estadio Pensativo, Antigua Guatemala
Referee: Julio Güity (Honduras)

20 August 2024
20:00 (18:00 UTC−6)

Real Estelí (Nicaragua)	2–1	(Costa Rica) Saprissa
Bonilla 7', 45+2'	Report	Rodríguez 90+6' (pen.)

Estadio Independencia, Estelí
Referee: Saíd Martínez (Honduras)
21 August 2024
20:00 (18:00 UTC−6)

Guanacasteca (Costa Rica)	1–1	(Nicaragua) Managua
Mora 30'	Report	Mendieta 41'

Estadio Edgardo Baltodano Briceño, Liberia
Referee: Lukasz Szpala (United States)

29 August 2024
18:00 (16:00 UTC−6)

Guanacasteca (Costa Rica)	1–0	(Nicaragua) Real Estelí
Venegas 81' (pen.)	Report

Estadio Edgardo Baltodano Briceño, Liberia
Referee: Christopher Mason (Jamaica)
29 August 2024
20:00 (18:00 UTC−6)

Saprissa (Costa Rica)	1–0	(Guatemala) Municipal
Rodríguez 41'	Report

Estadio Ricardo Saprissa Aymá, San Juan de Tibás
Referee: Filiberto Martínez (El Salvador)
