= Alejandro Bran =

Costa Rican footballer (born 2001)

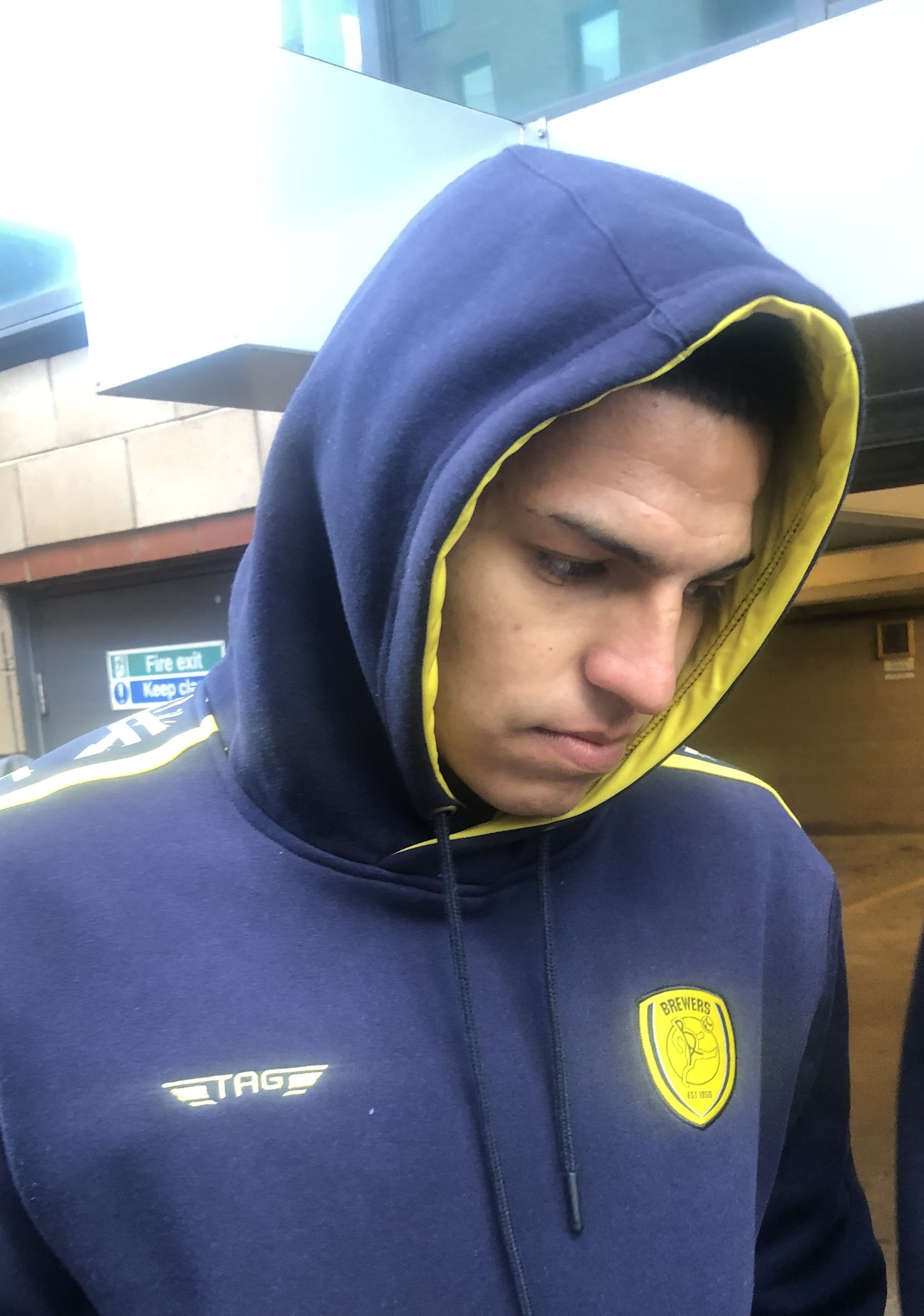
- Alejandro Bran in 2024.

Personal information
- Full name: Alejandro Jesús Bran Flores
- Date of birth: 5 March 2001 (age 25)
- Place of birth: San José, Costa Rica
- Height: 1.75 m (5 ft 9 in)
- Position: Midfielder

Team information
- Current team: Petrolul Ploiești
- Number: 10

Youth career
- –2020: Herediano

Senior career*
Years	Team	Apps	(Gls)
2020–2024	Herediano	36	(3)
2020–2021	→ Jicaral (loan)	14	(0)
2021	→ Municipal Grecia (loan)	3	(0)
2022–2023	→ Guanacasteca (loan)	26	(0)
2024	→ Minnesota United (loan)	11	(1)
2024	→ Minnesota United 2 (loan)	3	(1)
2024–2025	Minnesota United	0	(0)
2024	→ Burton Albion (loan)	1	(0)
2025	→ Alajuelense (loan)	29	(2)
2025–2026	Alajuelense	30	(3)
2026–	Petrolul Ploiești	12	(4)

International career^{‡}
2023	Costa Rica Olympic	8	(0)
2021–	Costa Rica	23	(4)
Medal record
Men's Football
Representing Costa Rica
Central American and Caribbean Games
Runner-up	2023 El Salvador
- * Club domestic league appearances and goals as of 31 October 2026 ‡ National team caps and goals as of 18 November 2025

Alejandro Jesús Bran Flores (born 5 March 2001) is a Costa Rican professional footballer who plays as a midfielder for Liga I club Petrolul Ploiești and the Costa Rica national team.

== Club career ==
From San Jose, Costa Rica, Bran debuted in the Costa Rican first division, Liga FPD with Jicaral. He also played on loan at Municipal Grecia and Guanacasteca, before earning a place in CS Herediano first team.

In January 2024, he signed for Major League Soccer side Minnesota United FC on loan for the 2024 season, with the option to make the deal permanent. On 25 February 2024, he scored on his league debut for Minnesota against Austin FC, a stoppage time winner in a 2–1 victory.

On 5 September 2024, Minnesota opted to make Bran's move to Minnesota permanent and immediately loaned him to EFL League One side Burton Albion until the end of their 2024–25 season, with Burton retaining an option to make the deal permanent. On 5 January 2025, Minnesota recalled Bran from his loan at Burton Albion and loaned him to Alajuelense until the end of December 2025. He moved to Alajuelense permanently on 19 September 2025.

In June 2026, he signed for Romanian club Petrolul Ploiești.

== International career ==
He is a Costa Rica international. He made his debut for Costa Rica's senior team in August 2021, when he was 20 years-old.

In May 2026, Bran and teammates Kenneth Vargas and Warren Madrigal were removed from the Costa Rica squad ahead of a friendly match against England in Florida after being caught up in a violent altercation in which gun shots were fired outside a nightclub in Los Yoses in the Costa Rican capital, San José. Images in the media showed at least five bullets had struck Bran's car.

== Career statistics ==
=== Club ===
As of 31 October 2026

Club	Season	League			National cup (Note: Includes Costa Rican Cup, FA Cup)		Continental		Other		Total	
Club	Season	Division	Apps	Goals	Apps	Goals	Apps	Goals	Apps	Goals	Apps	Goals
Jicaral (loan)	2020–21	Liga FPD	14	0	—		—		—		14	0
Municipal Grecia (loan)	2021–22	Liga FPD	3	0	—		—		—		3	0
Herediano	2021–22	Liga FPD	19	0	0	0	—		—		19	0
Herediano	2023–24	Liga FPD	17	3	0	0	—		4 (Note: Appearances in CONCACAF Central American Cup)	2	21	5
Herediano	Total		36	3	0	0	—		4	2	40	5
Guanacasteca (loan)	2022–23	Liga FPD	26	0	2	0	—		—		28	0
Minnesota United (loan)	2024	Major League Soccer	11	1	—		—		2 (Note: Appearances in Leagues Cup)	0	13	1
Minnesota United 2 (loan)	2024	MLS Next Pro	3	1	—		—		—		3	1
Burton Albion (loan)	2024–25	League One	1	0	1	0	—		2 (Note: Appearances in EFL Trophy)	0	4	0
Alajuelense (loan)	2024–25	Liga FPD	23	2	0	0	2 (Note: Appearances in CONCACAF Champions Cup)	0	—		25	2
Alajuelense	2025–26	Liga FPD	36	3	1	0	2	1	10 (Note: One appearance in Supercopa de Costa Rica, nine appearances in CONCACAF Central American Cup)	0	20	0
Alajuelense	Total		59	5	1	0	4	1	10	0	74	6
Petrolul Ploiești	2026–27	Liga I	12	4	1	1	—		—		13	5
Career total			165	14	5	1	4	1	18	2	192	18

=== International ===
As of match played 18 November 2025

Appearances and goals by national team and year
National team	Year	Apps	Goals
Costa Rica	2021	1	0
Costa Rica	2022	0	0
Costa Rica	2023	4	0
Costa Rica	2024	8	1
Costa Rica	2025	10	3
Total		23	4

Scores and results list Costa Rica's goal tally first.

List of international goals scored by Alejandro Bran
No.	Date	Venue	Opponent	Score	Result	Competition
1	18 November 2024	Estadio Rommel Fernández, Panama City, Panama	Panama	1–1	2–2	2024–25 CONCACAF Nations League A
2	25 March 2025	Estadio Nacional, San José, Costa Rica	Belize	2–0	6–1	2025 CONCACAF Gold Cup qualification
3	25 March 2025	Estadio Nacional, San José, Costa Rica	Belize	5–1	6–1	2025 CONCACAF Gold Cup qualification
4	7 June 2025	BFA Technical Centre, Wildey, Barbados	Bahamas	0–3	0–8	2026 FIFA World Cup qualification

== Honours ==
Herediano

- Liga FPD: 2021 Apertura

Alajuelense

- Liga FPD: 2025 Apertura
- Costa Rican Cup: 2024–25
- Supercopa de Costa Rica runner-up: 2026
- CONCACAF Central American Cup: 2025

Costa Rica Olympic

- Central American and Caribbean Games runner-up: 2023
