= 2024 CONCACAF Central American Cup =

Association football tournament

Tournament details
- Dates: 30 July – 4 December
- Teams: 20 (from 7 associations)

Final positions
- Champions: (Costa Rica) Alajuelense (2nd title)
- Runners-up: (Nicaragua) Real Estelí

Tournament statistics
- Matches played: 58
- Goals scored: 152 (2.62 per match)
- Top scorer(s): (Costa Rica) Diego Campos (6 goals)
- Best player: (Costa Rica) Diego Campos
- Best young player: (Nicaragua) Bryan Ordóñez
- Best goalkeeper: (Costa Rica) Leonel Moreira

The 2024 CONCACAF Central American Cup was the second edition of the CONCACAF Central American Cup, the first-tier annual international club football competition in the Central American region. It was contested by clubs whose football associations were affiliated with the Central American Football Union (UNCAF), a sub-confederation of CONCACAF.

The winners of the 2024 CONCACAF Central American Cup qualified directly for the 2025 CONCACAF Champions Cup round of 16, while the second through sixth-place teams qualified to round one of the same competition.

== Teams ==
Twenty teams from the seven UNCAF member associations qualified for the tournament based on results from their domestic leagues. Eighteen slots are predetermined by CONCACAF and the remaining two slots were granted to Costa Rica and Nicaragua as the national associations whose clubs were finalists in the previous edition of the tournament. The slot allocation for this edition was as follows:

- Costa Rica: 3+1 berths
- El Salvador, Guatemala, Honduras and Panama: 3 berths
- Nicaragua: 2+1 berths
- Belize: 1 berth

Association	Team	Qualifying method
Belize (1 berth)	Port Layola	2023–24 Premier League tournament champions (2024 Closing) with better record in aggregate table.
Costa Rica (4 berths)	Saprissa	2023–24 Liga FPD Apertura and Clausura champions
Costa Rica (4 berths)	Herediano	2023–24 Liga FPD aggregate table best team not yet qualified
Costa Rica (4 berths)	Alajuelense	2023–24 Liga FPD aggregate table second-best team not yet qualified
Costa Rica (4 berths)	Guanacasteca	2023–24 Liga FPD aggregate table third-best team not yet qualified
El Salvador (3 berths)	Águila	2023–24 Primera División Apertura champions
El Salvador (3 berths)	Alianza	2023–24 Primera División Clausura champions
El Salvador (3 berths)	Luis Ángel Firpo	2023–24 Primera División aggregate table best team not yet qualified
Guatemala (3 berths)	Comunicaciones	2023–24 Liga Nacional Torneo Apertura champions
Guatemala (3 berths)	Municipal	2023–24 Liga Nacional Torneo Clausura champions
Guatemala (3 berths)	Antigua	2023–24 Liga Nacional aggregate table best team not yet qualified
Honduras (3 berths)	Olimpia	2023–24 Honduran Liga Nacional Apertura and Clausura champions
Honduras (3 berths)	Marathón	2023–24 Honduran Liga Nacional aggregate table best team not yet qualified
Honduras (3 berths)	Motagua	2023–24 Honduran Liga Nacional aggregate table second-best team not yet qualified
Nicaragua (3 berths)	Diriangén	2023–24 Liga Primera Apertura and Clausura champions
Nicaragua (3 berths)	Managua	2023–24 Liga Primera aggregate table best team not yet qualified
Nicaragua (3 berths)	Real Estelí	2023–24 Liga Primera aggregate table second-best team not yet qualified
Panama (3 berths)	Independiente	2023 Liga Panameña Torneo Clausura champions
Panama (3 berths)	Tauro	2024 Liga Panameña Torneo Apertura champions
Panama (3 berths)	San Francisco	2023 Liga Panameña Torneo Clausura and 2024 Liga Panameña Torneo Apertura aggregate table best team not yet qualified

== Draw ==
The draw for the group stage was held on 6 June 2024 in Miami, Florida, United States. The 20 involved teams were previously seeded into five pots of four teams each based on their CONCACAF Club Ranking as of 3 June 2024.

Pot 1
Team	Rank
(Costa Rica) Saprissa	41
(Honduras) Olimpia	43
(Costa Rica) Alajuelense	50
(Costa Rica) Herediano	51

Pot 2
Team	Rank
(Guatemala) Municipal	52
(Guatemala) Comunicaciones	54
(Guatemala) Antigua	55
(Honduras) Motagua	56

Pot 3
Team	Rank
(Panama) Tauro	58
(Honduras) Marathón	59
(Panama) Independiente	60
(Costa Rica) Guanacasteca	71

Pot 4
Team	Rank
(Panama) San Francisco	77
(El Salvador) Alianza	80
(Nicaragua) Real Estelí	83
(El Salvador) Águila	86

Pot 5
Team	Rank
(Nicaragua) Diriangén	98
(El Salvador) Luis Ángel Firpo	113
(Nicaragua) Managua	146
(Belize) Port Layola	175

For the group stage, the 20 teams were drawn into four groups (Groups A–D) of five containing a team from each of the five pots. Teams from pot 1 were drawn first and were placed in the first position of their group, starting from Group A to Group D. The same procedure was followed for teams from pots 2, 3, 4 and 5, and they were placed in positions 2, 3, 4 and 5, respectively, within the group to which they were drawn. Each group must contain no more than two clubs from the same national association.

== Schedule ==
The schedule of the competition is as follows.

Stage	Round	First leg	Second leg
Group Stage	Matchday 1	30 July – 1 August	
Group Stage	Matchday 2	6–8 August	
Group Stage	Matchday 3	13–15 August	
Group Stage	Matchday 4	20–22 August	
Group Stage	Matchday 5	27–29 August	
Knockout	Quarterfinals	24–26 September	1–3 October
Knockout	Semifinals and play-in	22–24 October	29–31 October
Knockout	Finals	27 November	4 December

== Group stage ==
In the group stage, each group was played on a single home-and-away round-robin basis, with teams playing against each other once, for a total of four matches per team (two home and two away). The winners and runners-up of each group advanced to the quarter-finals of the knockout stage.

=== Group A ===
Pos	Team	Pld	W	D	L	GF	GA	GD	Pts	Qualification	HER	MOT	DIR	TAU	SFR
1	(Costa Rica) Herediano	4	3	1	0	4	1	+3	10	Advance to Quarter-finals	—	1–1	—	1–0	—
2	(Honduras) Motagua	4	2	1	1	9	6	+3	7	Advance to Quarter-finals	—	—	—	4–1	3–2
3	(Nicaragua) Diriangén	4	2	1	1	4	3	+1	7		0–1	2–1	—	—	—
4	(Panama) Tauro	4	1	0	3	4	8	−4	3		—	—	1–2	—	2–1
5	(Panama) San Francisco	4	0	1	3	3	6	−3	1		0–1	—	0–0	—	—

Source: CONCACAF
Rules for classification: 1) Points; 2) Goal difference; 3) Goals scored; 4) Head-to-head results (points, goal difference, goals scored); 5) Fair play points; 6) Drawing of lots.

=== Group B ===
Pos	Team	Pld	W	D	L	GF	GA	GD	Pts	Qualification	ALA	COM	MAR	ALI	LAF
1	(Costa Rica) Alajuelense	4	4	0	0	11	6	+5	12	Advance to Quarter-finals	—	2–1	3–1	—	—
2	(Guatemala) Comunicaciones	4	2	1	1	5	4	+1	7	Advance to Quarter-finals	—	—	2–1	1–0	—
3	(Honduras) Marathón	4	2	0	2	4	5	−1	6		—	—	—	1–0	1–0
4	(El Salvador) Alianza	4	1	0	3	6	6	0	3		1–2	—	—	—	5–2
5	(El Salvador) Luis Ángel Firpo	4	0	1	3	6	11	−5	1		3–4	1–1	—	—	—

Source: CONCACAF
Rules for classification: 1) Points; 2) Goal difference; 3) Goals scored; 4) Head-to-head results (points, goal difference, goals scored); 5) Fair play points; 6) Drawing of lots.

=== Group C ===
Pos	Team	Pld	W	D	L	GF	GA	GD	Pts	Qualification	ÁGU	ANT	OLI	CAI	PLA
1	(El Salvador) Águila	4	3	1	0	10	1	+9	10	Advance to Quarter-finals	—	—	2–0	—	5–1
2	(Guatemala) Antigua	4	2	2	0	7	3	+4	8	Advance to Quarter-finals	0–0	—	—	2–1	—
3	(Honduras) Olimpia	4	2	1	1	10	4	+6	7		—	1–1	—	3–0	—
4	(Panama) Independiente	4	1	0	3	2	8	−6	3		0–3	—	—	—	1–0
5	(Belize) Port Layola	4	0	0	4	3	16	−13	0		—	1–4	1–6	—	—

Source: CONCACAF
Rules for classification: 1) Points; 2) Goal difference; 3) Goals scored; 4) Head-to-head results (points, goal difference, goals scored); 5) Fair play points; 6) Drawing of lots.

=== Group D ===
Pos	Team	Pld	W	D	L	GF	GA	GD	Pts	Qualification	SAP	EST	MUN	MAN	GUA
1	(Costa Rica) Saprissa	4	3	0	1	10	4	+6	9	Advance to Quarter-finals	—	—	1–0	—	5–0
2	(Nicaragua) Real Estelí	4	2	1	1	6	3	+3	7	Advance to Quarter-finals	2–1	—	—	3–0	—
3	(Guatemala) Municipal	4	1	1	2	4	4	0	4		—	1–1	—	—	3–1
4	(Nicaragua) Managua	4	1	1	2	4	7	−3	4		2–3	—	1–0	—	—
5	(Costa Rica) Guanacasteca	4	1	1	2	3	9	−6	4		—	1–0	—	1–1	—

Source: CONCACAF
Rules for classification: 1) Points; 2) Goal difference; 3) Goals scored; 4) Head-to-head results (points, goal difference, goals scored); 5) Fair play points; 6) Drawing of lots.

== Knockout stage ==
The knockout stage will be played on a single-elimination tournament with the following rules:

- Each tie is played on a home-and-away two-legged basis. The home team of the second leg in each tie was determined separately for each round as follows (Regulations Article 12.11):
  - In the quarter-finals, the group winners hosted the second leg.
  - In the semi-finals and play-in, the higher-ranked teams based on total points accumulated in the group stage and the quarterfinals hosted the second leg.
  - In the finals, the higher-ranked team based on total points accumulated in the group stage, quarterfinals and semi-finals will host the second leg.
- In the quarter-finals and semi-finals, if tied on aggregate, the away goals rule would be used. If still tied, the penalty shoot-out would be directly used to determine the winners (Regulations Article 12.10.2).
- In the play-in and finals, if tied on aggregate, the away goals rule would also be used. If still tied, 30 minutes of extra time would be played but the away goals scored during this time would not serve as a tie-breaking criteria. If still tied after extra time, the penalty shoot-out would be used to determine the winner (Regulations Article 12.10.3).

=== Qualified teams ===
Group	Winners	Runners-up
A	(Costa Rica) Herediano	(Honduras) Motagua
B	(Costa Rica) Alajuelense	(Guatemala) Comunicaciones
C	(El Salvador) Águila	(Guatemala) Antigua
D	(Costa Rica) Saprissa	(Nicaragua) Real Estelí

=== Seeding ===
Teams were seeded 1–8 based on results in the group stage and assigned a position in a fixed bracket. For example, the first semi-final was contested between the winner of the 1 vs. 8 quarter-final and the winner of the 4 vs. 5 quarter-final. For each round, the host of the second leg was determined based on performance in all previous rounds, including the group stage.

The following was the seeding for the quarter-finals round only:

Seed	Grp	Team	Pld	W	D	L	GF	GA	GD	Pts	Matchups
1	B	(Costa Rica) Alajuelense	4	4	0	0	11	6	+5	12	Match QF1
2	C	(El Salvador) Águila	4	3	1	0	10	1	+9	10	Match QF3
3	A	(Costa Rica) Herediano	4	3	1	0	4	1	+3	10	Match QF4
4	D	(Costa Rica) Saprissa	4	3	0	1	6	2	+4	9	Match QF2
5	C	(Guatemala) Antigua	4	2	2	0	7	3	+4	8	Match QF2
6	A	(Honduras) Motagua	4	2	1	1	9	6	+3	7	Match QF4
7	D	(Nicaragua) Real Estelí	4	2	1	1	6	3	+3	7	Match QF3
8	B	(Guatemala) Comunicaciones	4	2	1	1	5	4	+1	7	Match QF1

Source: CONCACAF
Rules for classification: 1) Points; 2) Goal difference; 3) Goals scored; 4) Away goals scored; 5) Wins; 6) Away wins; 7) Disciplinary points (1 point for yellow card, 3 points for second yellow card/indirect red card, 4 points for direct red card, 5 points for yellow card and direct red card); 8) Drawing of lots (Regulations Article 12.11.4).

=== Bracket ===
The bracket was decided based on the quarter-finals seeding.

Play-in
(El Salvador) Águila	0	2	2
(Honduras) Motagua	2	2	4
(Costa Rica) Saprissa	1	3	4
(Guatemala) Comunicaciones	1	1	2

Quarter-finals
7	(Nicaragua) Real Estelí	2	0	2
2	(El Salvador) Águila	1	0	1
6	(Honduras) Motagua	2	0	2
3	(Costa Rica) Herediano (a)	2	0	2
5	(Guatemala) Antigua	0	3	3
4	(Costa Rica) Saprissa	0	0	0
8	(Guatemala) Comunicaciones	1	1	2
1	(Costa Rica) Alajuelense	2	1	3

Semi-finals
(Nicaragua) Real Estelí (a)	0	2	2
(Costa Rica) Herediano	0	2	2
(Guatemala) Antigua	0	0	0
(Costa Rica) Alajuelense	0	1	1

Finals
(Nicaragua) Real Estelí	1	1	2
(Costa Rica) Alajuelense	1	2	3

=== Quarter-finals ===
The first legs were played on 24–26 September, and the second legs were played on 1–3 October 2024.

Team 1	Agg.	Team 2	1st leg	2nd leg
Comunicaciones (Guatemala)	2–3	(Costa Rica) Alajuelense	1–2	1–1
Antigua (Guatemala)	3–0	(Costa Rica) Saprissa	0–0	3–0
Real Estelí (Nicaragua)	2–1	(El Salvador) Águila	2–1	0–0
Motagua (Honduras)	2–2 (a)	(Costa Rica) Herediano	2–2	0–0

=== Play-in ===
The first legs were played on 22 and 23 October, and the second legs were played on 29 and 30 October 2024.

Team 1	Agg.	Team 2	1st leg	2nd leg
Comunicaciones (Guatemala)	2–4	(Costa Rica) Saprissa	1–1	1–3
Motagua (Honduras)	4–2	(El Salvador) Águila	2–0	2–2

=== Semi-finals ===
The first legs were played on 22 and 24 October, and the second legs were played on 30 and 31 October 2024.

Team 1	Agg.	Team 2	1st leg	2nd leg
Antigua (Guatemala)	0–1	(Costa Rica) Alajuelense	0–0	0–1
Real Estelí (Nicaragua)	2–2 (a)	(Costa Rica) Herediano	0–0	2–2

=== Finals ===
Team 1	Agg.	Team 2	1st leg	2nd leg
Real Estelí (Nicaragua)	2–3	(Costa Rica) Alajuelense	1–1	1–2

== Top goalscorers ==
Team eliminated for this round.
Team inactive for this round.

As of 30 October 2024

Rank	Player	Team	GS1	GS2	GS3	GS4	GS5	QF1	QF2	PI1	PI2	SF1	SF2	F1	F2	Total
1	(Costa Rica) Diego Campos	(Costa Rica) Alajuelense	2	1		2		1								6
2	(Argentina) Agustín Auzmendi	(Honduras) Motagua		2						1	1					4
2	(Uruguay) Diego Casas	(Guatemala) Comunicaciones			1		1		1	1						4
2	(Jamaica) Javon East	(Costa Rica) Saprissa	1	1						1	1					4
2	(Argentina) Santiago Gómez	(Guatemala) Antigua			1		1		2							4
6	(Guatemala) José Ardón	(Guatemala) Antigua	3													3
6	(Nicaragua) Byron Bonilla	(Nicaragua) Real Estelí				2		1								3
6	(Honduras) Rubilio Castillo	(Honduras) Motagua			1		1	1								3
6	(Brazil) Gustavo Souza	(El Salvador) Luis Ángel Firpo	1	1	1											3
6	(El Salvador) Styven Vásquez	(El Salvador) Luis Ángel Firpo		2	1											3

== See also ==
- 2024 CONCACAF Caribbean Cup
- 2024 Leagues Cup
- 2025 CONCACAF Champions Cup
