= 2024 CONCACAF Central American Cup knockout stage =

Football competition

The 2024 CONCACAF Central American Cup knockout stage was played from 24 September to 4 December 2024. A total of eight teams competed in the knockout stage to decide the champions of the 2024 CONCACAF Central American Cup.

== Qualified teams ==
The winners and runners-up of each of the eight groups in the group stage advanced to the quarter-finals.

Group	Winners	Runners-up
A	(Costa Rica) Herediano	(Honduras) Motagua
B	(Costa Rica) Alajuelense	(Guatemala) Comunicaciones
C	(El Salvador) Águila	(Guatemala) Antigua
D	(Costa Rica) Saprissa	(Nicaragua) Real Estelí

=== Seeding ===
Teams were seeded 1–8 based on results in the group stage and assigned a position in a fixed bracket. For example, the first semi-final was contested between the winner of the 1 vs. 8 quarter-final and the winner of the 4 vs. 5 quarter-final. For each round, the host of the second leg was determined based on performance in all previous rounds, including the group stage.

== Format ==
The knockout stage was played on a single-elimination tournament with the following rules:

- Each tie was played on a home-and-away two-legged basis. The home team of the second leg in each tie was determined separately for each round as follows (Regulations Article 12.11):
  - In the quarter-finals, the group winners hosted the second leg.
  - In the semi-finals and play-in, the higher-ranked teams based on total points accumulated in the group stage and the quarter-finals hosted the second leg.
  - In the finals, the higher-ranked team based on total points accumulated in the group stage, quarter-finals and semi-finals hosted the second leg.
- In the quarter-finals and semi-finals, if tied on aggregate, the away goals rule would be used. If still tied, the penalty shoot-out would be directly used to determine the winners (Regulations Article 12.10.2).
- In the play-in and finals, if tied on aggregate, the away goals rule would also be used. If still tied, 30 minutes of extra time would be played but the away goals scored during this time would not serve as a tie-breaking criteria. If still tied after extra time, the penalty shoot-out would be used to determine the winner (Regulations Article 12.10.3).

== Bracket ==
The bracket of the final stages was determined as follows:

Round	Matchups
Quarter-finals	(Group winner team host second leg): Match QF1: Team seeded 1 vs. Team seeded 8; Match QF2: Team seeded 4 vs. Team seeded 5; Match QF3: Team seeded 2 vs. Team seeded 7; Match QF4: Team seeded 3 vs. Team seeded 6
Play-in round	(Higher-ranked team in each tie host second leg): Match PI1: Loser QF1 vs. Loser QF2; Match PI2: Loser QF3 vs. Loser QF4
Semi-finals	(Higher-ranked team in each tie host second leg): Match SF1: Winner QF1 vs. Winner QF2; Match SF2: Winner QF3 vs. Winner QF4
Finals	(Higher-ranked team host second leg): Winner SF1 vs. Winner SF2

The bracket was decided based on the quarter-finals seeding.

Play-in
(El Salvador) Águila	0	2	2
(Honduras) Motagua	2	2	4
(Costa Rica) Saprissa	1	3	4
(Guatemala) Comunicaciones	1	1	2

Quarter-finals
7	(Nicaragua) Real Estelí	2	0	2
2	(El Salvador) Águila	1	0	1
6	(Honduras) Motagua	2	0	2
3	(Costa Rica) Herediano (a)	2	0	2
5	(Guatemala) Antigua	0	3	3
4	(Costa Rica) Saprissa	0	0	0
8	(Guatemala) Comunicaciones	1	1	2
1	(Costa Rica) Alajuelense	2	1	3

Semi-finals
(Nicaragua) Real Estelí (a)	0	2	2
(Costa Rica) Herediano	0	2	2
(Guatemala) Antigua	0	0	0
(Costa Rica) Alajuelense	0	1	1

Finals
(Nicaragua) Real Estelí	1	1	2
(Costa Rica) Alajuelense	1	2	3

== Quarter-finals ==
In the quarter-finals, the teams were seeded based on their results in the group stage, with the group winners seeded 1–4, and the group runners-up seeded 5–8. The group winners hosted the second leg.

Seed	Grp	Team	Pld	W	D	L	GF	GA	GD	Pts	Matchups
1	B	(Costa Rica) Alajuelense	4	4	0	0	11	6	+5	12	Match QF1
2	C	(El Salvador) Águila	4	3	1	0	10	1	+9	10	Match QF3
3	A	(Costa Rica) Herediano	4	3	1	0	4	1	+3	10	Match QF4
4	D	(Costa Rica) Saprissa	4	3	0	1	6	2	+4	9	Match QF2
5	C	(Guatemala) Antigua	4	2	2	0	7	3	+4	8	Match QF2
6	A	(Honduras) Motagua	4	2	1	1	9	6	+3	7	Match QF4
7	D	(Nicaragua) Real Estelí	4	2	1	1	6	3	+3	7	Match QF3
8	B	(Guatemala) Comunicaciones	4	2	1	1	5	4	+1	7	Match QF1

Source: CONCACAF
Rules for classification: 1) Points; 2) Goal difference; 3) Goals scored; 4) Away goals scored; 5) Wins; 6) Away wins; 7) Disciplinary points (1 point for yellow card, 3 points for second yellow card/indirect red card, 4 points for direct red card, 5 points for yellow card and direct red card); 8) Drawing of lots (Regulations Article 12.11.4).

=== Summary ===
The first legs were played on 24–26 September, and the second legs were played on 1–3 October 2024.

Team 1	Agg.	Team 2	1st leg	2nd leg
Comunicaciones (Guatemala)	2–3	(Costa Rica) Alajuelense	1–2	1–1
Antigua (Guatemala)	3–0	(Costa Rica) Saprissa	0–0	3–0
Real Estelí (Nicaragua)	2–1	(El Salvador) Águila	2–1	0–0
Motagua (Honduras)	2–2 (a)	(Costa Rica) Herediano	2–2	0–0

=== Matches ===
26 September 2024
22:00 (20:00 UTC−6)

Comunicaciones (Guatemala)	1–2	(Costa Rica) Alajuelense
Mejía 3'	Report	Campos 52'; Toril 55'

Estadio Cementos Progreso, Guatemala City
Referee: Iván Bárton (El Salvador)
3 October 2024
22:00 (20:00 UTC−6)

Alajuelense (Costa Rica)	1–1	(Guatemala) Comunicaciones
Anderson Canhoto 37' (pen.)	Report	Casas 43'

Estadio Alejandro Morera Soto, Alajuela
Referee: Rubiel Vázquez (United States)

Alajuelense won 3–2 on aggregate, advanced to the semi-finals (Match SF1) and qualified for the 2025 CONCACAF Champions Cup Round One, at minimum. Comunicaciones advanced to the play-in.

24 September 2024
22:00 (20:00 UTC−6)

Antigua (Guatemala)	0–0	(Costa Rica) Saprissa
	Report

Estadio Pensativo, Antigua Guatemala
Referee: Oliver Vergara (Panama)
1 October 2024
22:00 (20:00 UTC−6)

Saprissa (Costa Rica)	0–3	(Guatemala) Antigua
	Report	Gómez 5', 84'; Bradley 90+5'

Estadio Ricardo Saprissa Aymá, San Juan de Tibás
Referee: Fernando Morón (Panama)

Antigua won 3–0 on aggregate, advanced to the semi-finals (Match SF1) and qualified for the 2025 CONCACAF Champions Cup Round One, at minimum. Saprissa advanced to the play-in.

25 September 2024
20:00 (18:00 UTC−6)

Real Estelí (Nicaragua)	2–1	(El Salvador) Águila
Vieyra 20'; Bonilla 37'	Report	Sosa 4'

Estadio Independencia, Estelí
Referee: Cristopher Corado (Guatemala)
2 October 2024
20:00 (18:00 UTC−6)

Águila (El Salvador)	0–0	(Nicaragua) Real Estelí
	Report

Estadio Cuscatlán, San Salvador
Referee: David Gómez (Costa Rica)

Real Estelí won 2–1 on aggregate, advanced to the semi-finals (Match SF2) and qualified for the 2025 CONCACAF Champions Cup Round One, at minimum. Águila advanced to the play-in.

25 September 2024
22:00 (20:00 UTC−6)

Motagua (Honduras)	2–2	(Costa Rica) Herediano
Castillo 3'; R. Auzmendi 79'	Report	González 47'; Rubio 90+7'

Estadio Nacional Chelato Uclés, Tegucigalpa
Referee: Filiberto Martínez (El Salvador)
2 October 2024
22:15 (20:15 UTC−6)

Herediano (Costa Rica)	0–0	(Honduras) Motagua
	Report

Estadio José Rafael Fello Meza Ivankovich, Cartago
Referee: Fernando Hernández (Mexico)

Tied 2–2 on aggregate, Herediano won on away goals, advanced to the semi-finals (Match SF2) and qualified for the 2025 CONCACAF Champions Cup Round One, at minimum. Motagua advanced to the play-in.

== Play-in ==
In the play-in, the team in each tie which have the better performance across all previous rounds (group stage and quarter-finals) host the second leg.

Pos	Team	Pld	W	D	L	GF	GA	GD	Pts	Host
1 (PI1)	(Costa Rica) Saprissa	6	3	1	2	6	5	+1	10	Second leg
2 (PI1)	(Guatemala) Comunicaciones	6	2	2	2	7	7	0	8	First leg
1 (PI2)	(El Salvador) Águila	6	3	2	1	11	3	+8	11	Second leg
2 (PI2)	(Honduras) Motagua	6	2	3	1	11	8	+3	9	First leg

Source: CONCACAF
Rules for classification: 1) Points; 2) Goal difference; 3) Goals scored; 4) Away goals scored; 5) Wins; 6) Away wins; 7) Disciplinary points (1 point for yellow card, 3 points for second yellow card/indirect red card, 4 points for direct red card, 5 points for yellow card and direct red card); 8) Drawing of lots (Regulations Article 12.11.4).

=== Summary ===
The first legs were played on 22 and 23 October, and the second legs were played on 29 and 30 October 2024.

Team 1	Agg.	Team 2	1st leg	2nd leg
Comunicaciones (Guatemala)	2–4	(Costa Rica) Saprissa	1–1	1–3
Motagua (Honduras)	4–2	(El Salvador) Águila	2–0	2–2

=== Matches ===
23 October 2024
22:00 (20:00 UTC−6)

Comunicaciones (Guatemala)	1–1	(Costa Rica) Saprissa
Casas 57'	Report	East 63'

Estadio Cementos Progreso, Guatemala City
Referee: Ismael Cornejo (El Salvador)
29 October 2024
22:00 (20:00 UTC−6)

Saprissa (Costa Rica)	3–1	(Guatemala) Comunicaciones
Torres 34'; East 57'; Díaz 75'	Report	Londoño 83'

Estadio Ricardo Saprissa Aymá, San Juan de Tibás
Referee: Said Martínez (Honduras)

Saprissa won 4–2 on aggregate and qualified for the 2025 CONCACAF Champions Cup Round One.

22 October 2024
20:00 (18:00 UTC−6)

Motagua (Honduras)	2–0	(El Salvador) Águila
Vega 5'; A. Auzmendi 16'	Report

Estadio Nacional Chelato Uclés, Tegucigalpa
Referee: Mario Escobar (Guatemala)
30 October 2024
20:00 (18:00 UTC−6)

Águila (El Salvador)	2–2	(Honduras) Motagua
Rivas 31'; Medrano 68'	Report	Mejía 54'; A. Auzmendi 64' (pen.)

Estadio Cuscatlán, San Salvador
Referee: Keylor Herrera (Costa Rica)

Motagua won 4–2 on aggregate and qualified for the 2025 CONCACAF Champions Cup Round One.

== Semi-finals ==
In the semi-finals, the team in each tie which have the better performance across all previous rounds (group stage and quarter-finals) host the second leg.

Pos	Team	Pld	W	D	L	GF	GA	GD	Pts	Host
1 (SF1)	(Costa Rica) Alajuelense	6	5	1	0	14	8	+6	16	Second leg
2 (SF1)	(Guatemala) Antigua	6	3	3	0	10	3	+7	12	First leg
1 (SF2)	(Costa Rica) Herediano	6	3	3	0	6	3	+3	12	Second leg
2 (SF2)	(Nicaragua) Real Estelí	6	3	2	1	8	4	+4	11	First leg

Source: CONCACAF
Rules for classification: 1) Points; 2) Goal difference; 3) Goals scored; 4) Away goals scored; 5) Wins; 6) Away wins; 7) Disciplinary points (1 point for yellow card, 3 points for second yellow card/indirect red card, 4 points for direct red card, 5 points for yellow card and direct red card); 8) Drawing of lots (Regulations Article 12.11.4).

=== Summary ===
The first legs were played on 22 and 24 October, and the second legs were played on 30 and 31 October 2024.

Team 1	Agg.	Team 2	1st leg	2nd leg
Antigua (Guatemala)	0–1	(Costa Rica) Alajuelense	0–0	0–1
Real Estelí (Nicaragua)	2–2 (a)	(Costa Rica) Herediano	0–0	2–2

=== Matches ===
22 October 2024
22:00 (20:00 UTC−6)

Antigua (Guatemala)	0–0	(Costa Rica) Alajuelense
	Report

Estadio Pensativo, Antigua Guatemala
Referee: Katia García (Mexico)
30 October 2024
22:15 (20:15 UTC−6)

Alajuelense (Costa Rica)	1–0	(Guatemala) Antigua
Parkins 45+4'	Report

Estadio Alejandro Morera Soto, Alajuela
Referee: Armando Villarreal (United States)

Alajuelense won 1–0 on aggregate and advanced to the finals.

24 October 2024
22:00 (20:00 UTC−6)

Real Estelí (Nicaragua)	0–0	(Costa Rica) Herediano
	Report

Estadio Independencia, Estelí
Referee: Tori Penso (United States)
31 October 2024
22:00 (20:00 UTC−6)

Herediano (Costa Rica)	2–2	(Nicaragua) Real Estelí
Montes 3'; Hernández 30'	Report	Ochoa 86', 90+8'

Estadio José Rafael Fello Meza Ivankovich, Cartago
Referee: Bryan López (Guatemala)

Tied 2–2 on aggregate, Real Estelí won on away goals and advanced to the finals.

== Finals ==
In the finals, the team which has the better performances across all previous rounds (group stage, quarter-finals and semi-finals) host the second leg.

Pos	Team	Pld	W	D	L	GF	GA	GD	Pts	Host
1	(Costa Rica) Alajuelense	8	6	2	0	15	8	+7	20	Second leg
2	(Nicaragua) Real Estelí	8	3	4	1	10	6	+4	13	First leg

Source: CONCACAF
Rules for classification: 1) Points; 2) Goal difference; 3) Goals scored; 4) Away goals scored; 5) Wins; 6) Away wins; 7) Disciplinary points (1 point for yellow card, 3 points for second yellow card/indirect red card, 4 points for direct red card, 5 points for yellow card and direct red card); 8) Drawing of lots (Regulations Article 12.11.4).

=== Summary ===
Team 1	Agg.	Team 2	1st leg	2nd leg
Real Estelí (Nicaragua)	2–3	(Costa Rica) Alajuelense	1–1	1–2

=== Matches ===
27 November 2024
21:00 (19:00 UTC−6)

Real Estelí (Nicaragua)	1–1	(Costa Rica) Alajuelense
Vargas 13'	Report	Borges 36' (pen.)

Estadio Independencia, Estelí
Referee: Selvin Brown (Honduras)
4 December 2024
21:00 (19:00 UTC−6)

Alajuelense (Costa Rica)	2–1	(Nicaragua) Real Estelí
Angulo 18'; Toril 31'	Report	Medina 90+1'

Estadio Alejandro Morera Soto, Alajuela
Referee: Ismael Cornejo (El Salvador)

Alajuelense won 3–2 on aggregate and qualified for the 2025 CONCACAF Champions Cup Round of 16.
