= 2025–26 Liga FPD =

Liga FPD
- Season: 2025–26
- Dates: Apertura: 27 July–20 December 2025; Clausura: 13 January–16 May 2026

The 2025–26 Liga FPD, also known as Liga Promérica for sponsorship reasons, was the 105th season of the Liga FPD, Costa Rica's top-flight tournament. It began with the Apertura tournament on 27 July 2025.

The season was played with ten teams, down from the traditional twelve, as a result of Guanacasteca and Santos de Guápiles being disqualified and having their licenses revoked.

Herediano are the defending champions, having won both tournaments of the previous season, being their 30th and 31st titles. The season also reintroduced the promoted side Guadalupe, who return after their relegation in 2023.

== Competition format ==
The season was played with ten teams, down from the traditional twelve, as a result of Guanacasteca and Santos de Guápiles being disqualified and having their licenses revoked. Therefore, the season's regular phase consisted of 18 matchdays. Otherwise the competition format was unchanged from the previous season.

The season was divided into Apertura and Clausura tournaments, with the Apertura scheduled to place between 27 July and 21 December 2025, and the Clausura between 11 January and 27 May 2026. In both tournaments, a regular phase of 18 matches is played, before the top four advance to the play-offs, which is a four-team knockout competition. If the regular phase and the play-offs have different winners then a grand final is played between the two to determine the tournament winner.

== Teams ==
=== Stadiums and locations ===
Locations of the 2025–26 Liga FPD teams
Location of teams in San José

Team	Location	Stadium	Capacity
Alajuelense	Alajuela	Alejandro Morera Soto	18,895
Cartaginés	Cartago	"Fello" Meza	8,831
Herediano	Santa Bárbara	Carlos Alvarado	4,250
Guadalupe	Guadalupe	"Colleya" Fonseca	4,500
Liberia	Liberia	Edgardo Baltodano	5,979
Pérez Zeledón	San Isidro de El General	Estadio Municipal	3,259
Puntarenas	Puntarenas	"Lito" Pérez	4,105
San Carlos	Ciudad Quesada	Carlos Ugalde	4,080
Saprissa	San Juan	Ricardo Saprissa	23,112
Sporting	San José (Pavas)	Ernesto Rohrmoser	3,000

== Apertura ==
The Apertura 2025 tournament (also shortened to A25) will begin on 27 July. It will be dedicated to former Saprissa and longtime Repretel commentator Hernán Morales.

=== Regular phase ===
==== League table ====
Pos	Team	Pld	W	D	L	GF	GA	GD	Pts	Qualification or relegation
1	Alajuelense (C)	18	12	4	2	29	10	+19	40	Advance to Playoffs and (if necessary) Grand final
2	Saprissa	18	10	4	4	32	20	+12	34	Advance to Playoffs
3	Cartaginés	18	7	7	4	19	12	+7	28	Advance to Playoffs
4	Liberia	18	7	6	5	20	21	−1	27	Advance to Playoffs
5	Herediano	18	7	5	6	22	22	0	26	
6	Pérez Zeledón	18	6	5	7	25	28	−3	23	
7	Puntarenas	18	4	9	5	22	21	+1	21	
8	Sporting	18	3	7	8	15	19	−4	16	
9	Guadalupe	18	2	7	9	17	32	−15	13	
10	San Carlos	18	3	4	11	15	31	−16	13	

Source: UNAFUT
Rules for classification: 1) points; 2) goal difference; 3) goals scored; 4) head-to-head points; 5) head-to-head goal difference; 6) head-to-head goals scored; 7) draw
(C) Champions

=== Playoffs ===
Semi-finals
1	Alajuelense	0	2	2
4	Herediano	1	1	2
2	Saprissa	0	2	2
3	San Carlos	0	0	0

Finals
1	Alajuelense	2	3	5
2	Saprissa	2	1	3

==== Final ====
Team 1	Agg.	Team 2	1st leg	2nd leg
Alajuelense	5–3	Saprissa	2–2	3–1

Since Alajuelense won the playoffs and also finished first in the regular season, no Grand Final was required, and Alajuelense were crowned champions automatically.

== Clausura ==
The Clausura 2026 season (officially known as Liga Promérica for sponsorship reasons and dedicated to Germán Chavarría) began on 13 January 2026 and is scheduled to end on 24 May 2026.

=== Regular season ===
The regular season is scheduled to be played from 13 January 2026 to 26 April 2026. The tournament features 10 teams following the disqualification of Santos de Guápiles and Guanacasteca during the 2025–26 cycle due to administrative licensing issues.

==== League table ====
Pos	Team	Pld	W	D	L	GF	GA	GD	Pts	Qualification or relegation
1	Herediano (C)	18	12	2	4	26	10	+16	38	Advance to Playoffs and (if necessary) Grand final
2	Saprissa	18	10	4	4	34	19	+15	34	Advance to Playoffs
3	Liberia	18	10	3	5	24	18	+6	33	Advance to Playoffs
4	Cartaginés	18	10	2	6	26	20	+6	32	Advance to Playoffs
5	Alajuelense	18	7	5	6	28	20	+8	26	
6	Sporting	18	6	4	8	16	21	−5	22	
7	San Carlos	18	6	3	9	21	25	−4	21	
8	Puntarenas	18	4	4	10	22	29	−7	16	
9	Pérez Zeledón	18	2	8	8	19	30	−11	14	
10	Guadalupe	18	3	5	10	13	37	−24	14	

Source: UNAFUT
(C) Champions

Semi-finals
3	Liberia	1	0	1
2	Saprissa	1	2	3
4	Cartaginés	0	0	0
1	Herediano	1	0	1

Finals
2	Saprissa	2	0	2
1	Herediano	1	2	3

==== Final ====
Team 1	Agg.	Team 2	1st leg	2nd leg
Saprissa	2–3	Herediano	2–1	0–2

Since Herediano won the playoffs and also finished first in the regular season, no Grand Final was required, and Herediano were crowned champions automatically.

== Aggregate table ==
Pos	Team	Pld	W	D	L	GF	GA	GD	Pts	Qualification or relegation
1	Saprissa	36	20	8	8	66	39	+27	68	Qualification for the Central American Cup group stage
2	Alajuelense	36	19	9	8	57	30	+27	66	Qualification for the Central American Cup group stage
3	Herediano	36	19	7	10	48	32	+16	64	Qualification for the Central American Cup group stage
4	Cartaginés	36	17	9	10	45	32	+13	60	Qualification for the Central American Cup group stage
5	Liberia	36	17	9	10	44	39	+5	60	
6	Sporting	36	9	11	16	31	40	−9	38	
7	Puntarenas	36	8	13	15	44	50	−6	37	
8	Pérez Zeledón	36	8	13	15	44	58	−14	37	
9	San Carlos	36	9	7	20	36	56	−20	34	Relegation to Liga de Ascenso
10	Guadalupe	36	5	12	19	30	69	−39	27	Relegation to Liga de Ascenso

Updated to match(es) played on 30 January 2026. Source:
Rules for classification: 1) points; 2) goal difference; 3) goals scored; 4) head-to-head points; 5) head-to-head goal difference; 6) head-to-head goals scored; 7) draw
