= Eduardo Anderson (footballer) =

Panamanian footballer (born 2001)

Personal information
- Full name: Eduardo Antonio Anderson Gómez
- Date of birth: 31 January 2001 (age 25)
- Place of birth: Panama City, Panama
- Height: 1.91 m (6 ft 3 in)
- Position: Centre-back

Team information
- Current team: Baltika Kaliningrad
- Number: 21

Youth career
- Alianza

Senior career*
Years	Team	Apps	(Gls)
2018–2026	Alianza	69	(2)
2023	→ San Carlos (loan)	33	(1)
2024–2025	→ Saprissa (loan)	40	(0)
2025	→ Monagas (loan)	15	(0)
2026	→ Baltika Kaliningrad (loan)	7	(0)
2026–	Baltika Kaliningrad	14	(0)

International career^{‡}
2022	Panama U23	2	(0)
2022–	Panama	9	(0)
- * Club domestic league appearances and goals as of 21 November 2026 ‡ National team caps and goals as of 25 September 2026

Eduardo Antonio Anderson Gómez (born 31 January 2001) is a Panamanian professional footballer who plays as a centre-back for Russian Premier League club Baltika Kaliningrad and the Panama national team.

== Club career ==
Born in Panama City, Anderson began his career with Alianza. He made his first team debut for the club on 23 September 2018, starting in a 1–0 away loss to Árabe Unido.

Anderson scored his first senior goal on 28 September 2019, netting his team's only in a 2–1 loss to Árabe Unido. He became a regular starter in the 2022 season, scoring once in 28 appearances.

On 7 December 2022, Anderson was loaned to Costa Rican side San Carlos for one year. Despite being regularly used, the club could not reach an agreement for a loan extension, and he left.

On 26 January 2024, Anderson was announced by Saprissa also in Costa Rica, on loan for one year with an option for a further six months.

On 7 February 2026, Anderson joined Russian club Baltika Kaliningrad on loan with an option to buy. On 30 May 2026, Baltika exercised their option to buy and signed a four-year contract with Anderson.

== International career ==
Anderson made his international debut with Panama on 1 May 2022, starting in a 3–2 non-FIFA friendly loss to El Salvador. Later in that month, he was called up with the Panama under-23s for the 2022 Maurice Revello Tournament.

Anderson's full international debut occurred on 9 June 2022, in a 5–0 CONCACAF Nations League win over Martinique.

== Career statistics ==
=== Club ===
As of 21 November 2026

Club	Season	League			Cup		Continental		Other		Total	
Club	Season	Division	Apps	Goals	Apps	Goals	Apps	Goals	Apps	Goals	Apps	Goals
Alianza	2018–19	Liga LPF	3	0	—		—		—		3	0
Alianza	2019–20	Liga LPF	11	1	—		—		—		11	1
Alianza	2020	Liga LPF	11	0	—		—		1 (Note: Appearances in Clausura play-offs)	0	12	0
Alianza	2021	Liga LPF	15	0	—		—		3	0	18	0
Alianza	2022	Liga LPF	25	1	—		2 (Note: Appearances in CONCACAF League)	0	3 (Note: Appearances in Apertura play-offs)	0	30	1
Alianza	2024	Liga LPF	1	0	—		—		—		1	0
Alianza	2025–26	Liga LPF	3	0	—		—		—		3	0
Alianza	Total		69	2	0	0	2	0	7	0	78	2
San Carlos (loan)	2022–23	Liga FPD	17	0	—		—		—		17	0
San Carlos (loan)	2023–24	Liga FPD	16	1	1	0	—		—		17	1
San Carlos (loan)	Total		33	1	1	0	0	0	0	0	34	1
Saprissa (loan)	2023–24	Liga FPD	9	0	—		2 (Note: Appearances in CONCACAF Champions Cup)	0	4 (Note: Appearances in Verano play-offs)	1	15	1
Saprissa (loan)	2024–25	Liga FPD	31	0	—		8 (Note: Six appearances in CONCACAF Central American Cup, two appearances in CONCACAF Champions Cup)	0	4	0	43	0
Saprissa (loan)	Total		40	0	0	0	10	0	8	1	58	1
Monagas (loan)	2025	Liga FUTVE	15	0	2	0	—		—		17	0
Baltika Kaliningrad (loan)	2025–26	Russian Premier League	7	0	0	0	—		—		7	0
Baltika Kaliningrad	2026–27	Russian Premier League	14	0	3	0	—		—		17	0
Baltika Kaliningrad	Club total		21	0	3	0	0	0	0	0	24	0
Career total			178	3	6	0	12	0	15	1	211	4

=== International ===
As of match played 25 September 2026

Appearances and goals by national team and year
National team	Year	Apps	Goals
Panama	2022	4	0
Panama	2023	3	0
Panama	2024	1	0
Panama	2026	1	0
Total		9	0

== Honours ==
Alianza

- Liga LPF: 2022 Apertura

Panama

- CONCACAF Gold Cup runner-up: 2023
