= 2023–24 Liga FPD =

Liga FPD
- Season: 2023–24
- Dates: 25 July 2023 – 26 May 2024
- Champions: Apertura: Saprissa; Clausura: Saprissa
- Relegated: Grecia
- Central American Cup: Saprissa; Herediano; Alajuelense; Guanacasteca

The 2023–24 Liga FPD season, also known as Liga Promérica for sponsorship reasons, was the 103st season since its establishment. The tournament was divided into two championships, the Apertura and Clausura, each in an identical format and each contested by 12 teams.

== Apertura ==
=== Regular season ===
Pos	Team	Pld	W	D	L	GF	GA	GD	Pts	Qualification or relegation
1	Saprissa	22	18	1	3	53	19	+34	55	Advance to playoffs and (if necessary) grand final
2	Alajuelense	22	14	4	4	42	23	+19	46	Advance to playoffs
3	Herediano	22	13	4	5	43	20	+23	43	Advance to playoffs
4	Cartaginés	22	11	4	7	36	28	+8	37	Advance to playoffs
5	Guanacasteca	22	11	4	7	28	25	+3	37	
6	San Carlos	22	7	5	10	26	28	−2	26	
7	Sporting	22	7	5	10	26	35	−9	26	
8	Santos de Guápiles	22	5	8	9	17	26	−9	23	
9	Municipal Liberia	22	5	7	10	36	43	−7	22	
10	Puntarenas	22	6	3	13	26	34	−8	21	
11	Pérez Zeledón	22	4	5	13	17	46	−29	17	
12	Grecia	22	3	6	13	19	42	−23	15	

Source: RSSSF
Rules for classification: 1) points; 2) goal difference; 3) goals scored; 4) head-to-head points; 5) head-to-head goal difference; 6) head-to-head goals scored; 7) draw

=== Play-off stage ===
==== Semi-finals ====
2 December 2023
21:00
First leg

Herediano	3–0	Alajuelense
Aguilar 13'; Godínez 45+1'; Cruz 61'

Estadio José Joaquín "Colleya" Fonseca, San José
Referee: Brayan Cruz
10 December 2023
18:00
Second leg

Alajuelense	1–0	Herediano
Navarro 57'

Estadio Alejandro Morera Soto, Alajuela
Referee: Benjamín Pineda

Herediano won 3–1 on aggregate.

3 December 2023
12:00
First leg

Cartaginés	0–2	Saprissa
		17' East; 71' Madrigal

Estadio José Rafael Fello Meza Ivankovich, Cartago
Referee: Pablo Camacho
9 December 2023
21:00
Second leg

Saprissa	4–0	Cartaginés
Brenes 3'; Escobar 15'; Rodríguez 83'; Sinclair 90+1'

Estadio Ricardo Saprissa Aymá, San José
Referee: David Gómez

Saprissa won 6–0 on aggregate.

==== Final ====
14 December 2023
21:00
First leg

Herediano	1–2	Saprissa
Cruz 56'		32', 48' Madrigal

Estadio José Joaquín "Colleya" Fonseca, San José
Referee: Adrián Chinchilla
17 December 2023
18:00
Second leg

Saprissa	1–0	Herediano
Chirinos 90+2'

Estadio Ricardo Saprissa Aymá, San José
Referee: Juan Gabriel Calderón

Saprissa won 3–1 on aggregate.

=== Grand final ===
As Saprissa won both the regular season and the play-offs, the grand final did not take place.

== Clausura ==
=== Regular season ===
Pos	Team	Pld	W	D	L	GF	GA	GD	Pts	Qualification or relegation
1	Saprissa	22	14	6	2	41	18	+23	48	Advance to playoffs and (if necessary) grand final
2	Herediano	22	13	5	4	34	17	+17	44	Advance to playoffs
3	Alajuelense	22	11	8	3	37	18	+19	41	Advance to playoffs
4	San Carlos	22	10	7	5	40	29	+11	37	Advance to playoffs
5	Municipal Liberia	22	11	4	7	36	31	+5	37	
6	Sporting	22	9	5	8	29	29	0	32	
7	Guanacasteca	22	8	6	8	30	28	+2	30	
8	Pérez Zeledón	22	6	5	11	19	30	−11	23	
9	Cartaginés	22	4	8	10	21	30	−9	20	
10	Puntarenas	22	4	7	11	18	31	−13	19	
11	Grecia	22	3	6	13	18	31	−13	15	
12	Santos de Guápiles	22	4	3	15	19	50	−31	15	

Source: RSSSF
Rules for classification: 1) points; 2) goal difference; 3) goals scored; 4) head-to-head points; 5) head-to-head goal difference; 6) head-to-head goals scored; 7) draw

=== Play-offs ===
==== Semi-finals ====
15 May 2024
18:00
First leg

Alajuelense	1–0	Herediano
Moya 59'

Estadio Alejandro Morera Soto, Alajuela
Referee: Adrián Chinchilla
18 May 2024
21:00
Second leg

Herediano	1–0	Alajuelense
Garza 82'
Penalties
	0–2

Carlos Alvarado Stadium, Santa Bárbara
Referee: Keylor Herrera

Alajuelense and Herediano drew 1–1 on aggregate. Alajualense advanced after winning on penalties.

16 May 2024
21:00
First leg

San Carlos	0–1	Saprissa
		72' Guzmán

Estadio Carlos Ugalde Álvarez, Quesada
Referee: Brayan Cruz
19 May 2024
19:00
Second leg

Saprissa	4–0	San Carlos
Torres 28'; Rodríguez 32'; Anderson 45+1'; East 84'

Estadio Ricardo Saprissa Aymá, San José
Referee: Pablo Camacho

Saprissa won 5–0 on aggregate.

==== Final ====
22 May 2024
22:00
First leg

Alajuelense	1–0	Saprissa
Navarro 90+17'

Estadio Alejandro Morera Soto, Alajuela
Referee: Juan Gabriel Calderón
26 May 2024
18:00
Second leg

Saprissa	3–0	Alajuelense
Rodríguez 15'; Paradela 71'; Sinclair 88'

Estadio Ricardo Saprissa Aymá, San José
Referee: Keylor Herrera

Saprissa won 3–1 on aggregate.

=== Grand final ===
As Saprissa won both the regular season and the play-offs, the grand final did not take place.

== Aggregate table ==
Pos	Team	Pld	W	D	L	GF	GA	GD	Pts	Qualification or relegation
1	Saprissa	44	32	7	5	94	37	+57	103	Qualified for 2024 CONCACAF Central American Cup group stage as Apertura and Clausura champions
2	Herediano	44	26	9	9	77	37	+40	87	Qualified for 2024 CONCACAF Central American Cup group stage from as best ranked remaining team in aggregate table
3	Alajuelense	44	25	12	7	79	41	+38	87	Qualified for 2024 CONCACAF Central American Cup group stage from as best ranked remaining team in aggregate table
4	Guanacasteca	44	19	10	15	58	53	+5	67	Qualified for 2024 CONCACAF Central American Cup group stage from as best ranked remaining team in aggregate table
5	San Carlos	44	17	12	15	66	57	+9	63	
6	Municipal Liberia	44	16	11	17	72	74	−2	59	
7	Sporting	44	16	10	18	55	64	−9	58	
8	Cartaginés	44	15	12	17	57	58	−1	57	
9	Puntarenas	44	10	10	24	44	65	−21	40	
10	Pérez Zeledón	44	10	10	24	36	76	−40	40	
11	Santos de Guápiles	44	9	11	24	36	76	−40	38	
12	Grecia	44	6	12	26	37	73	−36	30	Relegated to Segunda División de Costa Rica

Source: Apertura and Clausura tables
Rules for classification: 1) points; 2) goal difference; 3) goals scored; 4) head-to-head points; 5) head-to-head goal difference; 6) head-to-head goals scored; 7) draw
