= Cristian Quintero =

Cristian Quintero may refer to:

- Cristian Quintero (swimmer) (born 1992), Venezuelan swimmer
- Cristian Quintero (footballer) (born 1997), Panamanian footballer
