= José Pablo Córdoba =

Costa Rican footballer (born 1998)

Personal information
- Full name: José Pablo Córdoba Perez
- Date of birth: 10 December 1998 (age 27)
- Place of birth: Nicoya, Costa Rica
- Height: 1.78 m (5 ft 10 in)
- Positions: Midfielder; forward

Team information
- Current team: Puntarenas FC
- Number: 90

Youth career
- Escuela Gamalotal

Senior career*
Years	Team	Apps	(Gls)
–2019	Guanacasteca	1	(1)
2019-2021	Herediano	0	(0)
2019–2020	→ La U Universitarios (loan)	9	(2)
2021–2025	Guanacasteca	119	(33)
2022	→ Liberia (loan)	5	(7)
2025-	Puntarenas	21	(4)
- * Club domestic league appearances and goals as of 00:15, 27 May 2026 (UTC)

José Pablo Córdoba Perez (born 10 December 1998) is a Costa Rican professional footballer who plays for Puntarenas FC in the Liga FPD.

== Club career ==
From Nicoya, Córdoba played the opening section of the 2019 Segunda División de Costa Rica with A.D. Guanacasteca. He signed for C.S. Herediano in March 2019, but didn't establish a first team place and joined La U Universitarios on loan. He rejoined Guanacasteca and won promotion to the Liga FPD in May 2021. After a brief loan to A.D. Municipal Liberia under his former boss Minor Díaz in which he scored three goals in as many games, Córdoba struck a run of form during Clausura 2023, which led him to be the team's top scorer with six goals to move the club from the bottom of the table.

== International career ==
In March 2023 he was called up to the Costa Rica national football team for the first time.
