= Port Layola F.C. =

Association football club in Belize

Port Layola
- Full name: Port Layola Foot Ball Club
- Founded: 1983
- Ground: MCC Grounds, Belize City
- Capacity: 5,000
- Coach: Julius Allen
- League: Premier League of Belize
- 2024 Closing: 1st (champions)

Port Layola Foot Ball Club, mostly known as simply Port Layola, is a Belizean football club based in Belize City, Belize. The club's home ground is the FFB Stadium, where also the Belize national football team plays.

== History ==
Founded in 1983, Port Layola in 2024 won by the first time the Belizean league, after defeating Verdes FC. By winning the league, they qualified for the first time to an international competition, the 2024 CONCACAF Central American Cup. They were placed in Group C with Antigua GFC, CD Olimpia, Independiente and CD Águila. However, they lost all matches, with 16 conceded goals and just 3 goals scored.

== Current squad ==
As of August 21, 2024

Note: Flags indicate national team as defined under FIFA eligibility rules; some limited exceptions apply. Players may hold more than one non-FIFA nationality.

No.	Pos.	Nation	Player
1	GK	COL	Oscar Palomino
3	DF	BLZ	Norman Anderson
4	DF	BLZ	Enfield Núñez
5	DF	MEX	Juan Guzmán
6	MF	BLZ	Jarrel Young
7	DF	BLZ	Latrell Middleton
8	DF	COL	Miguel García
9	FW	BLZ	Gilroy Thurton
10	FW	BLZ	Jarret Davis
12	FW	BLZ	Akeem Sutherland
14	DF	BLZ	Justin Trapp
17	DF	BLZ	Floyd Jones
19	MF	PER	Mathias Barriga

No.	Pos.	Nation	Player
21	MF	BLZ	Leocadio Briceno
22	GK	BLZ	Raheem Baptist
23	DF	BLZ	Ian Gaynair
24	GK	BLZ	Carlos Palacios
27	MF	BLZ	Wayne Ford
30	MF	BLZ	Naim Wilson
33	MF	BLZ	Curtis Valerio
70	FW	COL	Andrés Orozco
77	MF	BLZ	Rene Leslie
80	MF	BLZ	Orlando Velásquez
99	FW	BLZ	Shawn Young

Source: (CONCACAF)

== Honours ==
=== National ===
Premier League of Belize

- Winners (2): 2024 Opening, 2024 Closing

=== International ===
CONCACAF Central American Cup

- Group stage: 2024

== List of coaches ==
- (Belize) Charlie Slusher (-August 2024)
- (Belize) Julius Allen (August 2024-December 2024)
- (Belize) Marvin Ottley (January 2025-Present)
