= 2024–25 Liga FPD =

Liga FPD
- Season: 2024–25
- Champions: Apertura: Herediano (30th title)
- Relegated: Santa Ana
- Central American Cup: Herediano; Alajuelense; Saprissa; Cartaginés
- Top goalscorer: Apertura: Marcel Hernández (10 goals); Clausura: Emanuel Casado (9 goals)

The 2024–25 Liga FPD season, also known as Liga Promérica for sponsorship reasons, was the 104th season since its establishment. The tournament is divided into two championships, the Apertura and Clausura, each in an identical format and each contested by 12 teams.

== Teams and Structure Changes ==
A total of 12 teams will contest the league, including 11 sides from the 2023–24 season and one team promoted from the Liga de Ascenso.

Like the previous season, the league has the following playoff format. The top 4 teams in the regular season will progress to a two-legged knockout tournament. If the same team that wins the regular season wins the playoff, that team wins the season championship immediately. Should a different team win the playoff than won the regular season, those two teams will meet in a two-legged Grand Final for the season championship.

Location of clubs in 2024-25 season
Location of clubs in San José province

Team	Location	Stadium	Capacity	Founded
Alajuelense	Alajuela, Alajuela	Alejandro Morera Soto	18,000	1919
Cartaginés	Cartago, Cartago	José Rafael "Fello" Meza	10,000	1906
Guanacasteca	Nicoya, Guanacaste	Estadio Chorotega	3,000	1973
Herediano	Heredia, Heredia	Eladio Rosabal Cordero (Note: Herediano is temporarily playing at Estadio "Colleya" Fonseca in Guadalupe, San José while their home stadium undergoes renovation)	8,000	1921
Municipal Liberia	Liberia, Guanacaste	Edgardo Baltodano	7,000	1977
Puntarenas F.C.	Puntarenas, Puntarenas	Estadio Lito Pérez	4,105	2004
Pérez Zeledón	San Isidro de El General, San José	Estadio Municipal	6,000	1991
San Carlos	Ciudad Quesada, Alajuela	Carlos Ugalde Álvarez	5,600	1965
Santa Ana	Santa Ana, San José	Piedades de Santa Ana	2,000	1993
Santos de Guápiles	Guápiles, Limón	Ebal Rodríguez	3,000	1961
Saprissa	San Juan de Tibás, San José	Ricardo Saprissa	23,000	1935
Sporting F.C.	Pavas, San José	Ernesto Rohrmoser	3,000	2016

== Apertura ==
The Apertura tournament was played from 20 July 2024 to 18 December 2024.

=== Regular season ===
The regular season began on 20 July 2024 and finished on 24 November 2024

==== Standings ====
Pos	Team	Pld	W	D	L	GF	GA	GD	Pts	Qualification or relegation
1	Alajuelense	22	13	7	2	37	18	+19	46	Advance to Playoffs and (if necessary) Grand final
2	Deportivo Saprissa	22	12	5	5	37	28	+9	41	Advance to Playoffs
3	San Carlos	22	10	9	3	41	26	+15	39	Advance to Playoffs
4	Herediano (C)	22	10	5	7	34	28	+6	35	Advance to Playoffs
5	Guanacasteca	22	10	5	7	26	31	−5	35	
6	Cartaginés	22	10	4	8	33	29	+4	34	
7	Sporting	22	8	3	11	27	27	0	27	
8	Municipal Liberia	22	7	5	10	32	30	+2	26	
9	Pérez Zeledón	22	4	10	8	20	27	−7	22	
10	Santos de Guápiles	22	5	6	11	29	39	−10	21	
11	Santa Ana	22	5	5	12	22	39	−17	20	
12	Puntarenas	22	3	6	13	18	34	−16	15	

Source: Soccerway
Rules for classification: 1) points; 2) goal difference; 3) goals scored; 4) head-to-head points; 5) head-to-head goal difference; 6) head-to-head goals scored; 7) draw
(C) Champions

==== Results ====
Home \ Away	LDA	CSC	SAP	ADG	CSH	LIB	PFC	PZ	SCA	STA	SAN	SFC
Alajuelense	—	2–1	1–1	4–0	2–0	2–2	4–0	2–1	3–1	1–1	2–1	1–0
Cartaginés	0–1	—	2–1	1–1	3–1	2–1	1–0	2–0	4–4	4–0	2–1	1–0
Deportivo Saprissa	3–0	1–0	—	3–1	1–0	2–2	2–3	2–2	3–2	2–1	3–3	1–0
Guanacasteca	1–0	1–3	2–0	—	2–1	2–0	2–1	1–0	0–3	2–1	2–1	2–1
Herediano	1–1	0–2	2–0	2–1	—	5–4	2–0	4–1	1–2	2–1	1–2	2–0
Municipal Liberia	1–2	3–0	0–1	0–1	1–1	—	4–2	1–0	1–2	2–3	4–0	1–1
Puntarenas	1–1	3–2	2–3	0–0	0–2	0–0	—	1–1	0–1	1–2	1–0	1–2
Pérez Zeledón	2–2	0–0	1–2	1–1	0–0	0–1	1–0	—	0–0	2–1	3–1	0–2
San Carlos	0–0	0–0	0–0	2–2	0–0	1–2	2–1	1–1	—	5–1	2–2	2–0
Santa Ana	0–2	2–1	0–3	2–1	1–1	2–1	1–1	0–0	3–4	—	1–1	0–2
Santos de Guápiles	1–3	1–0	1–2	4–0	3–4	0–1	0–0	3–3	0–4	1–0	—	2–1
Sporting	0–1	6–2	3–1	2–2	1–3	1–0	1–0	0–1	2–3	1–0	1–1	—

Updated to match(es) played on 01 December 2024. Source: Soccerway
Legend: Blue = home team win; Yellow = draw; Red = away team win.
For upcoming matches, an "a" indicates there is an article about the rivalry between the two participants.

=== Playoffs ===
Semifinals
1	Alajuelense	0	2	2
4	Herediano	2	2	4
2	Saprissa	2	2	4
3	San Carlos	2	0	2

Finals
4	Herediano	3	0	3
2	Saprissa	0	2	2

== Clausura ==
The Clausura 2025 season was played from 10 January 2025 to 21 May 2025.

=== Regular season ===
The regular season was played from 10 January 2025 to 7 May 2025.

==== Standings ====
Pos	Team	Pld	W	D	L	GF	GA	GD	Pts	Qualification or relegation
1	Herediano	22	13	7	2	38	18	+20	46	Advance to Playoffs and (if necessary) Grand final
2	Alajuelense (C)	22	10	12	0	28	12	+16	42	Advance to Playoffs
3	Puntarenas	22	11	8	3	29	18	+11	41	Advance to Playoffs
4	Deportivo Saprissa	22	11	6	5	30	18	+12	39	Advance to Playoffs
5	Cartaginés	22	11	5	6	29	16	+13	38	
6	Sporting San José	22	9	4	9	25	28	−3	31	
7	Municipal Liberia	22	7	3	12	26	26	0	24	
8	Santos de Guápiles (Note: The license of Santos was revoked by the FCRF and are ineligible to play the rest of the Clausura season.) (D)	22	6	6	10	26	33	−7	24	Disqualified from competition
9	Pérez Zeledón	22	6	5	11	16	28	−12	23	
10	San Carlos	22	4	7	11	16	23	−7	19	
11	Guanacasteca (Note: The license of Guanacasteca was revoked by the FCRF and are ineligible to play the rest of the Clausura season.) (D)	22	3	7	12	12	33	−21	16	Disqualified from competition
12	Santa Ana	22	2	8	12	22	44	−22	14	

Updated to match(es) played on 7 May 2025. Source: Soccerway
Rules for classification: 1) points; 2) goal difference; 3) goals scored; 4) head-to-head points; 5) head-to-head goal difference; 6) head-to-head goals scored; 7) draw
(C) Champions; (D) Disqualified

==== Results ====
Home \ Away	ALA	CTG	SPR	GUA	HER	LIB	PUN	PER	SCA	SAA	SNT	SPO
Alajuelense	—	1–0	1–1	1–0	1–1	2–0	0–0	0–0	0–0	6–3	2–0	0–0
Cartaginés	1–1	—	2–1	3–0	0–1	0–1	1–0	3–0	2–1	2–1	5–0	1–2
Deportivo Saprissa	1–1	1–1	—	3–0	1–0	1–1	0–0	0–0	3–0	3–0	1–0	2–0
Guanacasteca	1–1	1–0	2–0	—	0–3	1–0	1–1	0–1	0–2	0–0	0–1	0–3
Herediano	1–2	1–1	3–1	4–1	—	2–1	1–1	3–0	2–1	2–1	2–1	2–0
Municipal Liberia	1–3	0–1	2–3	1–1	0–1	—	1–1	2–1	0–1	4–0	0–1	1–0
Puntarenas	0–2	1–0	2–1	2–2	1–1	2–0	—	2–1	1–0	3–0	2–1	2–1
Pérez Zeledón	1–2	0–1	0–3	3–0	0–1	1–5	0–1	—	1–0	1–0	2–1	1–1
San Carlos	0–0	1–2	0–1	1–1	1–1	1–0	0–1	0–2	—	1–1	3–0	0–1
Santa Ana	1–1	0–1	2–1	0–0	1–1	1–4	1–2	0–0	2–2	—	3–3	1–2
Santos de Guápiles	0–0	1–1	2–0	1–0	2–2	0–1	1–1	3–1	1–1	2–3	—	2–3
Sporting San José	0–1	1–1	0–1	2–1	1–3	2–1	2–4	0–0	1–0	3–1	0–3	—

Updated to match(es) played on 7 May 2025. Source: Soccerway
Legend: Blue = home team win; Yellow = draw; Red = away team win.
For upcoming matches, an "a" indicates there is an article about the rivalry between the two participants.

=== Playoffs ===
Semifinals
1	Herediano	0	2	2
4	Saprissa	4	0	4
2	Alajuelense	0	1	1
3	Puntarenas	0	0	0

Finals
Saprissa	3	0	3
Alajuelense	3	1	4

== Aggregate table ==
Pos	Team	Pld	W	D	L	GF	GA	GD	Pts	Qualification or relegation
1	Alajuelense	44	23	19	2	65	30	+35	88	Qualification for the Central American Cup group stage
2	Herediano	44	23	12	9	72	46	+26	81	Qualification for the Central American Cup group stage
3	Deportivo Saprissa	44	23	11	10	67	46	+21	80	Qualification for the Central American Cup group stage
4	Cartaginés	44	21	9	14	62	45	+17	72	Qualification for the Central American Cup group stage
5	San Carlos	44	14	16	14	57	49	+8	58	
6	Sporting San José	44	17	7	20	52	55	−3	58	
7	Puntarenas	44	14	14	16	47	52	−5	56	
8	Guanacasteca (Note: The license of Guanacasteca was revoked by the FCRF and are ineligible to play the rest of the Clausura season.) (D)	44	13	12	19	38	64	−26	51	Disqualified from competition
9	Municipal Liberia	44	14	8	22	58	56	+2	50	
10	Santos de Guápiles (Note: The license of Santos was revoked by the FCRF and are ineligible to play the rest of the Clausura season.) (D)	44	11	12	21	55	72	−17	45	Disqualified from competition
11	Pérez Zeledón	44	10	15	19	36	55	−19	45	
12	Santa Ana (R)	44	7	13	24	44	83	−39	34	Relegation to Liga de Ascenso

Updated to match(es) played on 7 May 2025. Source: Soccerway
Rules for classification: 1) points; 2) goal difference; 3) goals scored; 4) head-to-head points; 5) head-to-head goal difference; 6) head-to-head goals scored; 7) draw
(D) Disqualified; (R) Relegated

== Attendances ==
The clubs by average home league attendance in the Clausura edition.

#	Club	Average attendance
1	Alajuelense	12,207
2	Saprissa	10,736
3	Herediano	2,864
4	Cartaginés	2,030
5	Pérez Zeledón	1,683
6	Municipal Liberia	1,504
7	Puntarenas	1,416
8	Sporting San José	1,023
9	Santos de Guápiles	916
10	Guanacasteca	764
11	San Carlos	452
12	Municipal Santa Ana	426
