= Styven Vásquez =

Salvadoran football player (born 2002)

Personal information
- Full name: Luis Styven Vásquez Velásquez
- Date of birth: 29 October 2002 (age 24)
- Place of birth: San Salvador, El Salvador
- Height: 1.79 m (5 ft 10 in)
- Position: Forward

Team information
- Current team: Luis Ángel Firpo
- Number: 7

Youth career
- Topiltzín
- El Vencedor
- Águila

Senior career*
Years	Team	Apps	(Gls)
2021–2022	Águila	10	(3)
2022–2025	Luis Ángel Firpo	113	(40)
2026	Irapuato	10	(3)
2026-	Luis Angel Firpo	4	(2)

International career^{‡}
2019	El Salvador U17	6	(2)
2023	El Salvador U22	4	(1)
2021–	El Salvador	23	(4)
- * Club domestic league appearances and goals as of 9 August 2026 ‡ National team caps and goals as of 9 August 2026

Luis Styven Vásquez Velásquez (born 29 October 2002) is a Salvadoran footballer who plays as a forward for Liga de Expansión MX club Irapuato and the El Salvador national team.

== Club career ==
Vásquez is a youth academy graduate of Águila. On 14 August 2021, he scored his first two goals of senior club career in a 4–1 league win against Atlético Marte.

== International career ==
Vásquez is a former Salvadoran youth national team player. He was part of the El Salvador squad which reached the quarter-finals of the 2019 CONCACAF U-17 Championship.

On 13 August 2021, Vásquez received his maiden call-up to senior team. He made his senior debut on 21 August by coming on as a 62nd-minute substitute for Erick Rivera in a goalless friendly match against Costa Rica.

== Career statistics ==
=== Club ===
As of 29 August 2021

Appearances and goals by club, season and competition
Club	Season	League			Cup		Continental		Other		Total	
Club	Season	Division	Apps	Goals	Apps	Goals	Apps	Goals	Apps	Goals	Apps	Goals
Águila	2020–21	Primera División	1	0	—		—		0	0	1	0
Águila	2021–22	Primera División	2	3	–		–		–		2	3
Career total			3	3	0	0	0	0	0	0	3	3

=== International ===
As of match played 18 November 2025

Appearances and goals by national team and year
National team	Year	Apps	Goals
El Salvador	2021	2	0
El Salvador	2022	4	0
El Salvador	2023	2	1
El Salvador	2024	5	2
El Salvador	2025	6	0
Total		19	3

Scores and results list El Salvador's goal tally first, score column indicates score after each Vásquez goal.

List of international goals scored by Styven Vásquez
No.	Date	Venue	Opponent	Score	Result	Competition
1	20 November 2023	Ergilio Hato Stadium, Willemstad, Curaçao	Curaçao	1–1	1–1	Friendly
2	10 October 2024	Arnos Vale Stadium, Kingstown, Saint Vincent and the Grenadines	Saint Vincent and the Grenadines	1–0	3–2	2024–25 CONCACAF Nations League
3	14 November 2024	Estadio Cuscatlán, San Salvador, El Salvador	Bonaire	1–0	1–0	2024–25 CONCACAF Nations League
