= Cristian Quintero (footballer) =

Panamanian football player (born 2000)

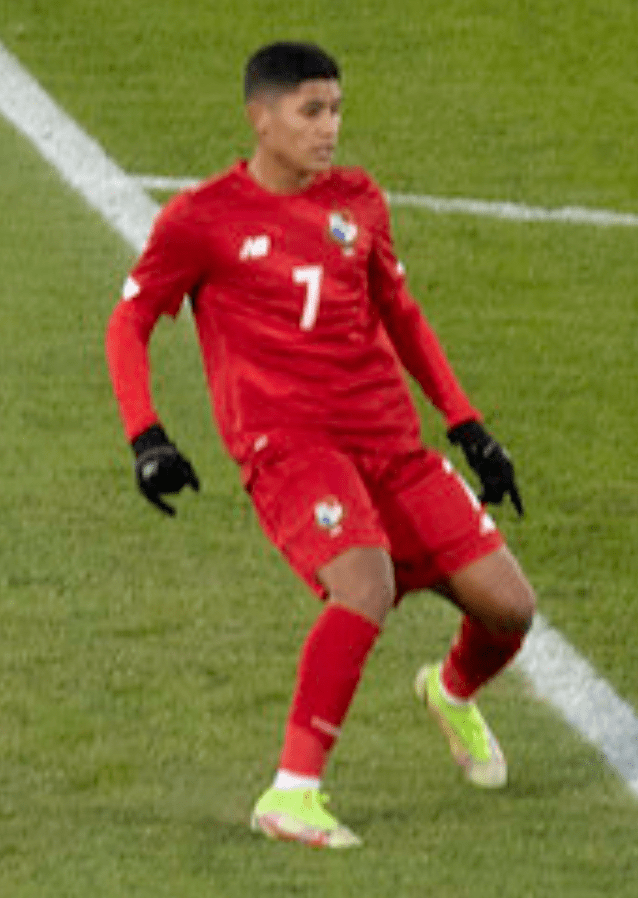

Personal information
- Full name: Cristian Josué Quintero Carvajal
- Date of birth: 23 May 2000 (age 26)
- Place of birth: Panama City, Panama
- Height: 1.60 m (5 ft 3 in)
- Position: Winger

Team information
- Current team: Tauro
- Number: 8

Senior career*
Years	Team	Apps	(Gls)
2018–	Tauro	71	(9)

International career^{‡}
2022–	Panama	1	(0)
- * Club domestic league appearances and goals as of 21:34, 1 February 2022 (UTC) ‡ National team caps and goals as of 21:34, 1 February 2022 (UTC)

Cristian Josué Quintero Carvajal (born 23 May 2000) is a football player from Panama. He plays as a winger for Tauro, and the Panama national team.

== International career ==
Quintero made his debut for the Panama national team in a 0-0 friendly tie with Peru on 16 January 2022.

== Honours ==
=== Club ===
Tauro F.C.

- Liga Panameña de Fútbol: 2018-19 Clausura, 2019 Apertura, 2021 Clausura
