= Carlos Alvarado Stadium =

Football stadium in Costa Rica

Coordinates: 10°02′27″N 84°09′38″W

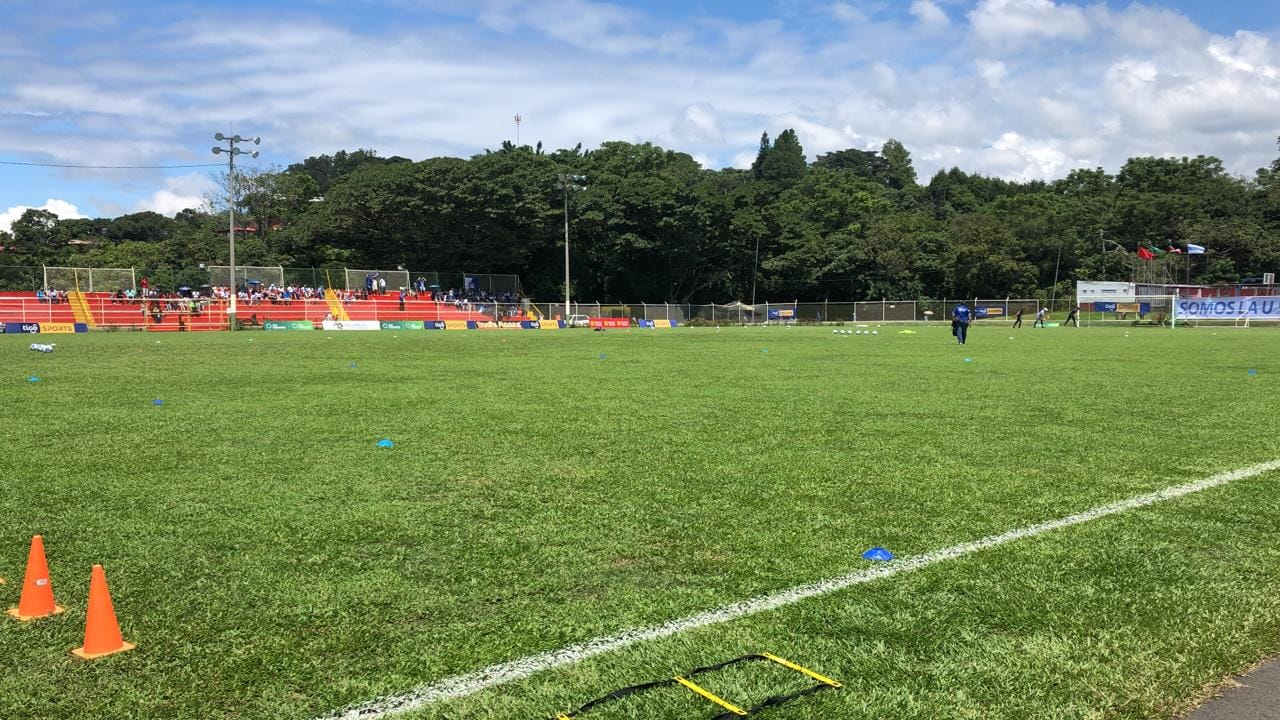
Estadio Carlos Alvarado

Carlos Alvarado Stadium is a football stadium in Costa Rica.

It is a multi-use stadium in Santa Bárbara, Costa Rica. It is currently used mostly for football matches and is the temporary home stadium of Club Sport Herediano. The stadium holds 4,250 people.
