= Liga Deportiva Alajuelense =

Costa Rican sports club

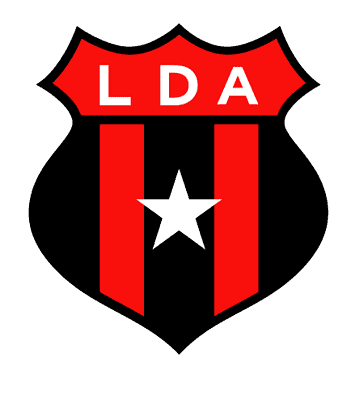
- Full name: Asociación Liga Deportiva Alajuelense
- Nicknames: Leones (The Lions), La Liga (The League), Manudos (Big-Handed)
- Short name: LDA
- Founded: June 18, 1919; 107 years ago
- Ground: Estadio Alejandro Morera Soto
- Capacity: 17,895
- President: Joseph Joseph Saidy
- Head coach: Óscar Ramírez
- League: Liga Promerica
- Apertura 2025: 1st (Champions)
- Website: lda.cr
Home colours	Away colours

Asociación Liga Deportiva Alajuelense (LDA), commonly known as Alajuelense and nicknamed La Liga, is a Costa Rican multisport club based in Alajuela. It is most famous for its association football team, which competes in the Primera División de Costa Rica, the top tier of the Costa Rican football league system.

As of January 2026, Alajuelense is the defending champion of the Liga FPD, having secured their 31st national title in the Apertura 2025 tournament. Under the management of club legend Óscar Ramírez, they defeated rivals Deportivo Saprissa in the final with a 5–3 aggregate score (2–2 in the first leg and 3–1 in the second leg at the Morera Soto). Following this victory and their continued success in the CONCACAF Central American Cup, Alajuelense was ranked as the highest-placed Central American club in the official CONCACAF club rankings for 2026.

The club plays its home matches at the Estadio Alejandro Morera Soto, also known as "The Cathedral." Alajuelense is one of two clubs to have never been relegated, alongside Herediano.

== History ==
The team was created in 1919 when a group of friends that used to play in a team called the "Electra" at first and then "Once de Abril" (April the 11th) met at "Salon París". They wanted to give the city a team that could represent them at a national level. They played their first official game on August 2 of that same year against Cartaginés getting their first victory, 3–1.

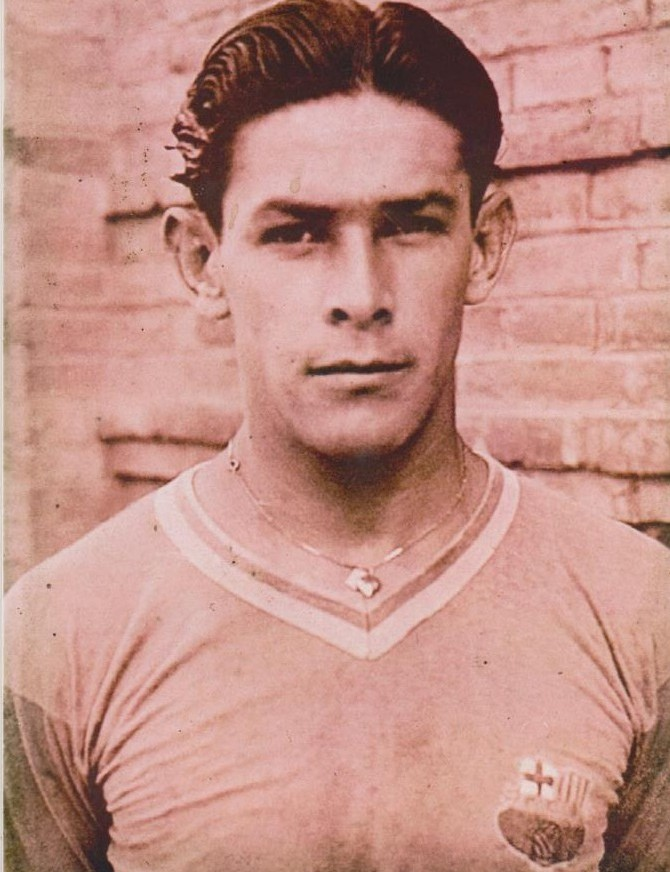
Alejandro Morera Soto, most important idol of the club.

Alajuelense was part of the 7 teams that built and formed the National League in Costa Rica, back in 1921, along with La Libertad, Gimnástica Española, Herediano, Cartaginés, CS Tres Rios de La Union, and Sociedad Gimnástica Limonense. They won their first championship in 1928. They are the only team to win the championship with a perfect record; in 1941 they won all 6 games. In 1960, the team made a tour around the world, leaving Costa Rica on September 17. In 78 days, the team played 24 games, winning 12, losing seven and drawing five. They scored 71 goals and allowed 47, with a remarkable performance from Juan Ulloa Ramírez, the best player and top scorer of this tour.

Liga Deportiva Alajuelense logo in 1919

Alajuelense's best decade was the 1990s, during which they won 4 Championships and 4 sub-championships (2nd place finishes). By the end of the 1990s and into the middle of the 2000s, they won a total of 5 local championships, 2 Copa Interclubes UNCAF Trophies, and a CONCACAF Club Championship. Alajuelense was the base for the Costa Rican football team in the Korea and Japan 2002 FIFA World Cup, fielding 9 players.

By November 11, 2000, and after participating in the Copa Merconorte, Alajuelense was ranked 27th in IFFHS's Club World Ranking. It is the best rank any Central American club has reached.

The club struggled with financial and administrative problems in the second part on the 2000s decade, so they decided to end contract with a lot of their regular and known players and started to build a team based on their younger divisions and make some structural changes. Nowadays the club is free of debts and with a team averaging 25-year-old players is still one of the best teams in the area and one of the teams with most fans in Costa Rica. On June 10, 2019, the club celebrated its 100th anniversary, being the second Costa Rican team to do so.

In 2023, Alajuelense participated in the 2023 CONCACAF Central American Cup, and they would advance to quarter-finals after being leaders on the Group D. They would face Cartaginés, that they would defeat 6–1 on aggregate, advancing to semifinals, where they would face Herediano, defeating them 5–4 on penalties after a 4–4 aggregate draw. In the final, they would face Real Estelí, but they would defeat them easily after a 4–1 victory on aggregate, being the first champions of the CONCACAF Central American Cup, and qualifying directly for the round of 16 of the 2024 CONCACAF Champions Cup.

== Stadium ==
The Estadio Alejandro Morera Soto is the home of Alajuelense and is owned and operated by La Liga Deportiva Alajuelense. It is located in El Llano neighborhood of Alajuela.

On July 20, 1966, due to a motion by the Municipality of Alajuela, the stadium was renamed in honor of Alejandro Morera, nicknamed el mago del balón, which means the magician of the ball. He was a notable former player of Alajuelense, Barcelona, and Hércules, and for commercial purposes, in an agreement with the financial institution Scotiabank in 2011, the name Scotiabank was added.

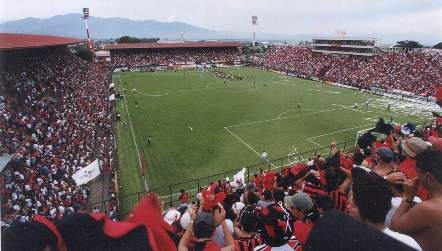
Estadio Alejandro Morera Soto

The project to find a proper site for a permanent home started in 1938, when the director of the club, Carlos Bolaños, proposed that the club should purchase its own land. The land was purchased on October 7, 1940, but the terrain would not be football-ready until when the first game was played on January 18, 1942, when Alajuelense played against Cartaginés; the stadium only had a simple wooden stand that was previously used in the Estadio Nacional.

On September 27, 1949, a professor from a local high school named Armando Morux Sancho started what was called La marcha del ladrillo, meaning The March of Bricks in which every student would donate a brick to help build the walls and stands of the stadium. The first stands to be built were located in north, west and east around the pitch.

On March 19, 1970, the stadium saw its first night game when Alajuelense faced Honduran club Motagua, beating them 4–1.

In 1979, the enlargement of the stadium was initiated with the project of building a second stand on top of the existing stand and adding an additional stand over the dressing and conference rooms (south) and also adding a roof to the stands located to the east and the south. The project was fully completed in 1984. The stadium was re-inaugurated that year along with the new illuminations, which were amongst the best illuminations systems at the time.

On 8 April 2021, the team announced plans for a new stadium, with an expected opening by January 2025.

== Mascot ==
The team is now represented by a Lion and Lioness dressed with the team uniform and wearing cleats as if he was going to play.

In every home game, the mascot comes out at the pitch before the game starts and plays on the field with fans, jokes with rival's fans, walk through the pitch with models giving away gifts from their sponsors and cheers the team with a huge team's flag. Before the game starts and during the half-time break, the Lion walks among the crowd and stands for pictures with the children.

The original mascot used to be a Mango, this because the team is located in Alajuela that is known as "La Ciudad de los Mangos" ("The Mangoes' City") because of the high amount of Mango Trees that could be located in the province due its weather, but later on in the early 80's, the mascot was changed into a Lion.

The Lion was chosen years ago because it represents four main attributes of the major king of the jungle, that are reflected on the team's vision and mission: Courage, Strength, Dynamism and Fidelity.

== Sponsors ==
- Jersey supplier

Manufacturer	Period	Sponsor
None	1977–1980	(United States) Lee
None	1980	(Brazil) Caloi
(Costa Rica) Jugados	1983–1986	(United States) Lee
(Costa Rica) Jugados	1986–1987	(Costa Rica) Punto Rojo
None	1987–1988	(United States) Glidden
None	1988	(Costa Rica) Jabón Fortuna
None	1988–1992	(United States) Coca-Cola Cherry
None	1992–1996	(United States) Coca-Cola
(United States) Nike	1996–1998	(Costa Rica) Mutual Alajuela
(Mexico) Atletica	1998–2000	(Costa Rica) Mutual Alajuela
(Mexico) Escord	2000–2001	(Costa Rica) Popular Pensiones
(Brazil) Finta	2001–2002	(United States) Coca-Cola
(Costa Rica) Jugados	2003–2008	(United States) Coca-Cola
(Germany) Puma	2008–2009	(South Korea) LG
(Germany) Puma	2010–2011	(Japan) Sony (France) Citroën
(Germany) Puma	2012–2015	(Spain) Movistar (Canada) Scotiabank
(Germany) Puma	2016	(Spain) Movistar (Panama) Banco General
(Germany) Puma	2017	(Mexico) Claro (Mexico) Volaris
(Spain) Kelme	2018	(Japan) Toyota (United States) Mobil (Japan) Bridgestone (Costa Rica) Kolbi
(Spain) Kelme	2019–2023	(Costa Rica) Kolbi (Costa Rica) Refrescos Tropical
(England) Umbro	2024	(Costa Rica) Don Pedro (United States) Gatorade (United States) Mastercard (Costa Rica) San Miguel
(England) Umbro	2025	(Costa Rica) BAC Credomatic (Costa Rica) Dos Pinos (Costa Rica) Medismart (Costa Rica) Monge
(England) Umbro	2026–present	(China) BYD Auto (Costa Rica) Jack's (Costa Rica) Tosty (Costa Rica) Tropical
(England) Umbro	2026–present	(Germany) ABUS (Costa Rica) Star Cars (Costa Rica) FUTV Tica Bus

- Jersey sponsors

Kolbi – Tuasa – Repretel – Cementos Fortaleza – Toyota – Mobil

== Honours ==
=== National ===
- Primera División de Costa Rica
  - Champions (31): 1928, 1939, 1941, 1945, 1949, 1950, 1958, 1959, 1960, 1966, 1970, 1971, 1980, 1983, 1984, 1991, 1992, 1995–96, 1996–97, 1999–00, 2000–01, 2001–02, 2002–03, 2004–05, Invierno 2010, Verano 2011, Invierno 2011, Invierno 2012. Invierno 2013, Apertura 2020, Apertura 2025
  - Runners-up (30): 1930, 1928, 1944, 1952, 1957, 1962, 1965, 1967, 1969, 1972, 1985, 1986, 1989, 1993–94, 1994–95, 1997–98, 1998–99, 2006–07, Verano 2008, Invierno 2008, Verano 2014, Verano 2015, Invierno 2015, Verano 2016, Apertura 2019, Clausura 2020, Clausura 2022, Clausura 2023, Clausura 2024, Apertura 2024
- Torneo de Copa de Costa Rica
  - Champions (11): 1926, 1928, 1937, 1941, 1944, 1948, 1949, 1974, 1977, 2023, 2024–25
  - Runners-up (3): 1938, 1947, 1956
- Supercopa de Costa Rica
  - Champions (2): 1967, 2012
  - Runners-up (2): 2021, 2026

=== International ===
==== Intercontinental ====
- Copa Interamericana
  - Runners-up (1): 1986

==== Continental ====
- CONCACAF Champions Cup
  - Champions (2): 1986, 2004
  - Runners-up (3): 1971, 1992, 1999
- CONCACAF League
  - Champions (1): 2020
  - Runners-up (1): 2022

==== Regional ====
- CONCACAF Central American Cup
  - Champions (3): 2023, 2024, 2025
- Torneo Grandes de Centroamérica/Copa Interclubes UNCAF
  - Champions (3): 1996, 2002, 2005
  - Runners-up (2): 1999, 2000

=== Friendly ===
- Torneo Relámpago de Fútbol de Costa Rica: 1944, 1945
- Campeonato Centroamericano y Caribe: 1961
- Cuadrangular Antonio Escarré: 1964
- KLM Cup: 1994
- Torneo 90 Minutos por la Vida: 2003, 2015, 2018, 2019, 2020, 2022, 2024
- Copa de las Américas: 2004
- Superclásico de Costa Rica: 2012, 2013 2014, 2015

=== Awards ===
- CONCACAF League Fair Play: 2020, 2022

== Performance in CONCACAF competitions ==
- CONCACAF Champions Cup/League: 29 appearances

1962 – Second round (quarter-finals)
1968 – First round
1971 – Finalist
1973 – Third round (quarter-finals)
1986 – Champion
1988 – Semi-finals
1991 – Third round (quarter-finals)
1992 – Finalist
1993 – Second round (quarter-finals)
1995 – Third place
1996 – Second round
1997 – Second round
1998 – Quarter-finals
1999 – Finalist
2000 – Quarter-finals
2002 – Semi-finals
2003 – Quarter-finals
2004 – Champion
2006 – Semi-finals
2008-09 – First round
2011–12 – Group stage
2012–13 – Group stage
2013–14 – Semi-finals
2014–15 – Semi-finals
2021 – Round of 16
2023 – Round of 16
2024 – Round of 16
2025 – Round of 16
2026 – Round of 16

- CONCACAF League: 4 appearances

2017 – First round
2020 – Champion
2021 – First round
2022 – Finalist

- CONCACAF Central American Cup: 3 appearances

2023 – Champion
2024 – Champion
2025 – Champion

=== Recent seasons ===
The following table lists the club's performance in national and international competitions over recent cycles. As of the end of the Apertura 2025, Alajuelense has secured 31 national league titles.

Season	Domestic League								Domestic Cup	Other Cups	International	
Season	Pld	W	D	L	GF	GA	Pts	Position	Domestic Cup	Other Cups	Competition	Position
2023–24	44	23	11	10	82	44	80	Semifinals	Winners	Recopa (RU)	Central American Cup	Winners
2024–25	44	23	14	7	76	40	83	Runners-up	Winners	Recopa (W)	Central American Cup	Winners
2025–26	22	13	7	2	44	17	46	Apertura Winners	Semifinals	Recopa (W)	Central American Cup	Winners

- Note: The 2025–26 Clausura season is currently in progress. Regular season statistics above reflect the Apertura 2025 phase.

==== 2025–26 cycle summary ====
- Apertura 2025: Alajuelense finished the regular season in first place and clinched their **31st national title** by defeating Deportivo Saprissa in the double-legged final (5–3 aggregate) in December 2025.
- International: The club achieved a historic "three-peat" in the CONCACAF Central American Cup, winning the 2023, 2024, and 2025 editions, maintaining their status as the top-ranked club in Central America according to the CONCACAF club rankings.
- Other Trophies: Led by head coach Óscar Ramírez, the team also secured the **Recopa de Costa Rica** in July 2025 after defeating Herediano.

== Player records ==
Most appearances (as of 20 January 2026)
#	Name	Career	Apps	Goals
1	(Costa Rica) Wilmer López	1993–07	478	80
2	(Costa Rica) Luis Marín	1993–11*	451	17
3	(Costa Rica) Harold Wallace	1995–08*	424	18
4	(Costa Rica) Mauricio Montero	1987–98	408	12
5	(Costa Rica) Álvaro Solano	1978–91	396	73
6	(Costa Rica) Luis Diego Arnáez	1993–05	390	76
7	(Costa Rica) Javier Delgado	1990–03*	377	15
8	(Costa Rica) Allen Guevara	2010–20; 2024–*	361	46
9	(Costa Rica) Pablo Gabas	2003–18*	348	64
10	(Costa Rica) Joaquín Guillén	1987–98	331	9

* Denotes player had more than one spell with the club.

All-time top scorers (as of 20 January 2026)
#	Player	Career	Apps	Goals
1	(Costa Rica) Errol Daniels	1964–72	168	196
2	(Costa Rica) Jonathan McDonald	2011–20*	265	127
3	(Costa Rica) Juan Ulloa	1954–62	112	89
4	(Costa Rica) Wilmer López	1993–07	478	80
5	(Costa Rica) Luis Diego Arnáez	1993–05	390	76
6	(Costa Rica) Álvaro Solano	1978–91	396	73
7	(Slovakia) Josef Miso	1995–03	208	72
8	(Costa Rica) Roy Sáenz	1963–76*	154	71
9	(Costa Rica) Javier Jiménez	1972–84*	282	71
10	(Costa Rica) Juan José Gámez	1960–74	312	69

* Denotes player had more than one spell with the club.

== Players ==
=== Current squad ===
As of 21 August 2026

Note: Flags indicate national team as defined under FIFA eligibility rules; some limited exceptions apply. Players may hold more than one non-FIFA nationality.

No.	Pos.	Nation	Player
1	GK	CRC	Bayron Mora
2	DF	CRC	Deylan Paz
4	DF	CRC	Guillermo Villalobos
5	MF	CRC	Celso Borges (captain)
7	FW	CRC	Anthony Hernández
8	MF	ARG	Malcom Pilone
9	FW	MEX	Ángel Zaldívar
10	FW	VEN	Juanpi
12	FW	CRC	Luis Díaz
13	DF	CRC	Alexis Gamboa
14	MF	CRC	Roan Wilson
15	DF	CRC	Farbod Samadian
17	DF	CRC	Daniel Chacón
18	FW	MEX	Ronaldo Cisneros
21	DF	CRC	Yeison Molina

No.	Pos.	Nation	Player
22	DF	CRC	Rónald Matarrita
23	GK	URU	Washington Ortega
24	DF	CRC	Aarón Salazar
25	DF	CRC	Santiago van der Putten
26	DF	CRC	Fernando Piñar
29	MF	CRC	Deylan Aguilar
33	FW	COL	Jeison Lucumí
34	MF	CRC	Creichel Pérez
35	MF	CRC	Rashir Parkins
36	FW	CRC	Isaac Badilla
39	FW	CRC	Esteban Cruz
40	GK	CRC	Daniel Velásquez
42	DF	CRC	John Ruiz
99	FW	CRC	Kenyel Michel (on loan from Minnesota United)

=== Out on loan ===
Note: Flags indicate national team as defined under FIFA eligibility rules; some limited exceptions apply. Players may hold more than one non-FIFA nationality.

No.	Pos.	Nation	Player
—	DF	CRC	Elián Quesada (at Pérez Zeledón)
—	FW	HAI	Tristán Demetrius (at AD Sarchí)

No.	Pos.	Nation	Player
—	FW	CRC	Dylan Masís (at San Carlos)
—	FW	CRC	Doryan Rodríguez (at Puntarenas)

=== Retired numbers ===
20 – (Costa Rica) Mauricio Montero, defender (1987–98)

== Historical list of coaches ==
- (Costa Rica) Carlos Watson
- (Costa Rica) Luis Diego Arnaez
- (Argentina) Andrés Carevic (20 Nov 2022 - 7 March 2024)
- (Brazil) (Costa Rica) Alexandre Guimarães (12 March 2024 - 17 April 2025)
- (Costa Rica) Óscar Ramírez (18 April 2025 - 1 May 2026 )
