= Diego Casas =

Uruguayan footballer (born 1995)

Personal information
- Full name: Diego Mateo Casas López
- Date of birth: March 4, 1995 (age 31)
- Place of birth: Vichadero, Uruguay
- Height: 1.80 m (5 ft 11 in)
- Position: Forward

Team information
- Current team: Marquense

Youth career
- –2013: River Plate

Senior career*
Years	Team	Apps	(Gls)
2013–2016	River Plate	23	(2)
2016	→ Villa Española (loan)	24	(6)
2017	Juventud	13	(1)
2017	Sportivo Luqueño	9	(0)
2018	Sud América	13	(2)
2019	Cerro	22	(3)
2020–2022	Deportivo Maldonado	24	(2)
2022–2023	Fénix	18	(3)
2023	Iraklis Larissa	17	(3)
2023–2024	Cobán Imperial	22	(11)
2024–2025	Comunicaciones	15	(5)
2025–	Marquense	0	(0)

International career
2014–2015	Uruguay U-20	3	(1)
- * Club domestic league appearances and goals as of 18:00, 18 January 2025 (UTC)

Diego Mateo Casas López (born March 4, 1995) is an Uruguayan professional footballer who plays as a forward for Liga Guate club Marquense.

== Career ==
=== River Plate Montevideo ===
Casas began his career in 2012 with River Plate Montevideo, where he played for three seasons.

=== Cobán Imperial ===
In October 2023, following a short spell in Greece with Iraklis Larissa, Casas joined Guatemalan club Cobán Imperial.
