= Santiago Gómez (footballer, born 1996) =

Argentine footballer (born 1996)

Personal information
- Full name: Santiago Manuel Gómez
- Date of birth: 3 February 1996 (age 30)
- Place of birth: Villa Mercedes, San Luis, Argentina
- Position: Forward

Team information
- Current team: Antigua
- Number: 14

Youth career
- 2010–2017: Independiente

Senior career*
Years	Team	Apps	(Gls)
2017–2018	Independiente	0	(0)
2017–2018	→ Deportivo Armenio (loan)		
2018–2021	Deportivo Armenio		
2021	Guillermo Brown	14	(0)
2022–	Excursionistas	32	(15)
2023	→ Real Cartagena (loan)	38	(19)
2024	Deportivo Pereira	8	(0)
2024-	Antigua	0	(0)
- * Club domestic league appearances and goals as of 23:04, 28 April 2024 (UTC)

Santiago Manuel Gómez (born 3 February 1996) is an Argentine professional footballer who plays as a forward for Liga Nacional club Antigua.

== Club career ==
=== Deportivo Armenio ===
Born in Villa Mercedes in the San Luis Province of Argentina, Gómez trialled with Argentine Primera División sides Independiente, Boca Juniors and Lanús in 2010, signing with the former. On 27 January 2017, he signed a professional contract with the club, before being loaned to Primera C Metropolitana side Deportivo Armenio for two-and-a-half years. Despite the contract being valid for four years, in early 2018 Gómez requested that he be released from his contract, and he joined Deportivo Armenio on a permanent basis as a free agent.

The 2018–19 season started well for Gómez; in the club's first thirteen games, he scored eight goals. In August 2019, he suffered a fracture to the metatarsal on his right foot, and was out of action until November of the same year. In August 2020, following the postponement of the season due to the COVID-19 pandemic in Argentina, Gómez confirmed that he still had a contract with Deportivo Armenio until 2021.

=== Guillermo Brown and Excursionistas ===
Following Khalil Caraballo's long-term injury, Guillermo Brown signed Gómez on a contract until December 2022 to cover the striker's absence in June 2021. Following one season with Guillermo Brown, in which he failed to score in fourteen appearances, he joined Primera C Metropolitana side Excursionistas.

==== Loan to Real Cartagena ====
In November 2022, Gómez signed a new two-year deal with Excursionistas, before the club announced he would be spending the 2023 season with Colombian Categoría Primera B side Real Cartagena. He marked his debut with two goals and an assist, as Real Cartagena beat Patriotas Boyacá 3–2. He continued his goal-scoring form, scoring eight goals in his first seventeen appearances, and began drawing the attention of first-division sides Atlético Junior and Once Caldas in May 2023.

The following month, he broke Emanuel Molina's record as the top Argentine scorer for Real Cartagena with two goals against Deportes Quindío, taking his tally to ten. On 10 June 2023, Gómez was left out of Real Cartagena's squad for their league game against Fortaleza C.E.I.F., with football journalist Diego Rueda stating that he had reached an agreement an unnamed top-flight club in Colombia, with Atlético Bucaramanga also being touted as an interested party.

A day later, Gómez himself stated that he had agreed personal terms with Atlético Junior, and was waiting for the clubs to sign the appropriate paperwork. However, despite these strong links, Gómez declared on 21 June that he would be staying with Real Cartagena, saying: "I want to stay, focus on the preseason to meet the goal of promotion".

=== Deportivo Pereira ===
After finishing the 2023 season as second-top scorer to Jhonier Alfonso of Fortaleza C.E.I.F., Gómez was announced as a new signing for Categoría Primera A side Deportivo Pereira. However, just a month into his contract with Deportivo, in which he was seen to have underperformed, having scored no goals, he was linked with a move back to Real Cartagena.

== Career statistics ==
=== Club ===
As of 13 August 2023.

Appearances and goals by club, season and competition
Club	Season	League			Cup		Other		Total	
Club	Season	Division	Apps	Goals	Apps	Goals	Apps	Goals	Apps	Goals
Independiente	2016–17	Argentine Primera División	0	0	0	0	0	0	0	0
Independiente	2017–18	Argentine Primera División	0	0	0	0	0	0	0	0
Independiente	Total		0	0	0	0	0	0	0	0
Deportivo Armenio	2016–17	Primera C Metropolitana	77	28	0	0	0	0	77	28
Deportivo Armenio	2017–18	Primera C Metropolitana	77	28	0	0	0	0	77	28
Deportivo Armenio	2018–19	Primera C Metropolitana	77	28	0	0	0	0	77	28
Deportivo Armenio	2019–20	Primera B Metropolitana	15	2	1 (Note: Appearances in the Copa Argentina)	0	0	0	16	2
Deportivo Armenio	Total		92	30	1	0	0	0	93	30
Guillermo Brown	2021	Primera Nacional	14	0	0	0	0	0	14	0
Excursionistas	2022	Primera C Metropolitana	32	15	0	0	0	0	32	15
Excursionistas	2023	Primera C Metropolitana	0	0	0	0	0	0	0	0
Excursionistas	Total		32	15	0	0	0	0	32	15
Real Cartagena (loan)	2023	Categoría Primera B	38	19	3 (Note: Appearances in the Copa Colombia)	1	0	0	26	12
Deportivo Pereira	2024	Categoría Primera A	8	0	3	0	0	0	11	0
Career total			184	64	7	1	0	0	191	65
