= CONCACAF Central American Cup =

Secondary continental football tournament for clubs in Central America

- Organizer(s): UNCAF; CONCACAF
- Founded: 2023; 3 years ago
- Region: Central America
- Teams: 20
- Qualifier for: CONCACAF Champions Cup
- Related competitions: CONCACAF Caribbean Cup; Leagues Cup
- Current champion(s): (Costa Rica) Alajuelense (3rd title)
- Most championships: (Costa Rica) Alajuelense (3 titles)
- Broadcaster: CONCACAF (YouTube)
- Website: Official website
- 2026 CONCACAF Central American Cup

The CONCACAF Central American Cup (Spanish: Copa Centroamericana de CONCACAF) is an international association football competition organized by CONCACAF as its top regional tournament for clubs from Central America. It serves as a qualification method for the CONCACAF Champions Cup.

Alajuelense is the only champion in the tournament's history, winning all three editions.

== History ==
On 21 September 2021, CONCACAF announced plans for an expansion of the CONCACAF Champions League tournament from 16 to 27 teams beginning in 2024. As part of the restructuring, regional qualification tournaments would be held for teams from North America, Central America, and the Caribbean beginning in 2023. The CONCACAF Central American Cup replaced the CONCACAF League as the sole method of qualification to CONCACAF Champions Cup for teams from Central America.

== Competition format ==
The tournament is structured into a group phase and a knockout phase. During the group phase, the 20 teams are split into four groups of five. Teams play one game against each team in their group and the top two teams in each group advance to the knockout phase. The knockout phase consists of four rounds plus a play-in round for the losers of the quarterfinals.

The two play-in round and four quarterfinal winners qualify for the CONCACAF Champions Cup. The Central American Cup winner receives a first round bye and advances directly to the Champions Cup Round of 16 while the other qualifying teams enter Round One.

== Qualification ==
A total of 20 teams representing all seven Central American Football Union members qualify based on the results of their domestic league seasons. The qualification criteria for 18 of the berths is as follows:

Nation	League	Participants
Costa Rica	Liga FPD	3 clubs
El Salvador	Primera División de Fútbol de El Salvador	3 clubs
Guatemala	Liga Nacional de Fútbol de Guatemala	3 clubs
Honduras	Liga Nacional de Fútbol Profesional de Honduras	3 clubs
Panama	Liga Panameña de Fútbol	3 clubs
Nicaragua	Liga Primera de Nicaragua	2 clubs
Belize	Premier League of Belize	1 club

For the 2023 edition, Costa Rica and Honduras were awarded an extra slot by having clubs that reached the finals of the 2022 CONCACAF League. For the 2024 and 2025 edition, Costa Rica and Nicaragua were awarded an extra slot by having clubs that reached the finals of the 2023 and 2024 CONCACAF Central American Cup. For the 2026 edition, Costa Rica and Guatemala were awarded an extra slot by having clubs that reached the finals of the 2025 CONCACAF Central American Cup.

== Results ==
Year	Champions	Results	Runners-up	Venue
2023	(Costa Rica) Alajuelense	3–0	(Nicaragua) Real Estelí	(Nicaragua) Estadio Independencia, Estelí
2023	(Costa Rica) Alajuelense	1–1	(Nicaragua) Real Estelí	(Costa Rica) Estadio Alejandro Morera Soto, Alajuela
2024	(Costa Rica) Alajuelense	1–1	(Nicaragua) Real Estelí	(Nicaragua) Estadio Independencia, Estelí
2024	(Costa Rica) Alajuelense	2–1	(Nicaragua) Real Estelí	(Costa Rica) Estadio Alejandro Morera Soto, Alajuela
2025	(Costa Rica) Alajuelense	1–1	(Guatemala) Xelajú	(Costa Rica) Estadio Alejandro Morera Soto, Alajuela
2025	(Costa Rica) Alajuelense	1–1 (4–3 p)	(Guatemala) Xelajú	Cementos Progreso Stadium, Guatemala City
2026	(Costa Rica)		(Costa Rica)	(Costa Rica) Estadio Fello Meza, Cartago
2026	(Costa Rica)		(Costa Rica)	(Costa Rica) Estadio Alejandro Morera Soto, Alajuela

== Performances ==
Performance by club
Club	Titles	Runners-up	Years won	Years runners-up
(Costa Rica) Alajuelense	3	0	2023, 2024, 2025	–
(Nicaragua) Real Estelí	0	2	–	2023, 2024
(Guatemala) Xelajú	0	1	–	2025

Performance by nation
Nation	Titles	Runners-up	Total
Costa Rica	4	1	5
Nicaragua	0	2	2
Guatemala	0	1	1

== All-time standings ==
As of 3 December 2025
Only the top 10 are shown (2023–present).

Rank	Club	Pld	W	D	L	GF	GA	GD	Pts
1	(Costa Rica) Alajuelense	30	18	10	2	53	26	+27	64
2	(Nicaragua) Real Estelí	24	10	8	6	30	26	+4	38
3	(Costa Rica) Saprissa	20	10	6	4	36	16	+20	36
4	(Honduras) Motagua	24	9	8	7	36	32	+4	35
5	(Costa Rica) Herediano	20	8	10	2	33	27	+6	34
6	(Honduras) Olimpia	16	9	5	2	35	15	+20	32
7	(Panama) Independiente	16	7	3	6	23	22	+1	24
8	(Costa Rica) Cartaginés	16	6	4	6	30	20	+10	22
9	(Panama) Sporting San Miguelito	12	7	1	4	17	14	+3	22
10	(Guatemala) Comunicaciones	16	5	6	5	22	20	+2	21

== See also ==
- UNCAF Women's Interclub Championship
- CONCACAF Champions Cup
- CONCACAF Caribbean Cup
- CONCACAF League
- Leagues Cup
