= Javon East =

Jamaican footballer (born 1995)

Personal information
- Full name: Javon Romario East
- Date of birth: 22 March 1995 (age 31)
- Place of birth: Kingston, Jamaica
- Height: 1.78 m (5 ft 10 in)
- Position: Striker

Team information
- Current team: Hapoel Be'er Sheva
- Number: 20

Senior career*
| Years | Team | Apps | (Gls) |
| 2013–2020 | Portmore United | 117 | (38) |
| 2019–2020 | → Santos de Guápiles (loan) | 36 | (21) |
| 2020–2021 | San Carlos | 12 | (1) |
| 2021–2022 | Santos de Guápiles | 47 | (20) |
| 2022–2025 | Saprissa | 113 | (39) |
| 2025–2026 | Hapoel Haifa | 34 | (15) |
| 2026– | Hapoel Be'er Sheva | 20 | (5) |

International career^{‡}
| 2018– | Jamaica | 26 | (4) |
- * Club domestic league appearances and goals as of 22:59, 26 October 2026 (UTC) ‡ National team caps and goals as of 07:00, 18 November 2026 (UTC)

Javon Romario East (born 22 March 1995) is a Jamaican professional footballer who plays as a striker for Israeli Premier League club Hapoel Be'er Sheva and the Jamaica national team.

== Club career ==
He has played club football for Portmore United. With East in the squad Portmore United won the 2017–2018 RSPL title.

In June 2019, East moved on loan to Santos de Guápiles in Costa Rica. In August 2020, he moved to fellow Costa Rican club San Carlos.

In July 2022 East joined Costa Rican giants Saprissa. In January 2025 he signed for Israeli club Hapoel Haifa.

On 29 January 2026, East signed a two-year contract with Hapoel Be'er Sheva, set to take effect from the start of the 2026–27 season. On 7 February 2026, he joined Hapoel Be'er Sheva immediately in a transfer valued at 600,000 NIS. On 14 February, East made his debut in a 2–1 victory over FC Ashdod in the Israeli Premier League at Yud-Alef Stadium.

== International career ==
East made his international debut for Jamaica in January 2018 in a friendly against South Korea. He scored his first goal for the Reggae Boyz against Guyana on 19 November 2019.

In July 2021, East was initially named to Jamaica's squad for the 2021 CONCACAF Gold Cup, but soon after pulled out due to a hamstring injury and was replaced by Andre Gray.

== Career statistics ==
=== International ===
As of match played 5 October 2026

Appearances and goals by national team and year
| National team | Year | Apps | Goals |
|---|---|---|---|
| Jamaica | 2018 | 8 | 0 |
| Jamaica | 2019 | 4 | 1 |
| Jamaica | 2020 | 1 | 1 |
| Jamaica | 2021 | 6 | 0 |
| Jamaica | 2022 | 1 | 0 |
| Jamaica | 2026 | 4 | 2 |
| Total | | 23 | 4 |

=== International goals ===
As of 2 October 2026

Scores and results list Jamaica's goal tally first, score column indicates score after each East goal.

List of international goals scored by Javon East
| No. | Date | Venue | Opponent | Score | Result | Competition |
|---|---|---|---|---|---|---|
| 1. | 18 November 2019 | Montego Bay Sports Complex, Montego Bay, Jamaica | Guyana | 1–1 | 1–1 | 2019–20 CONCACAF Nations League B |
| 2. | 17 November 2020 | Prince Faisal bin Fahd Stadium, Riyadh, Saudi Arabia | Saudi Arabia | 2–1 | 2–1 | Friendly |
| 3. | 2 October 2026 | Estadio Cuscatlán, San Salvador, El Salvador | El Salvador | 1–0 | 2–0 | 2026–27 CONCACAF Nations League A |
| 4. | 2 October 2026 | Estadio Cuscatlán, San Salvador, El Salvador | El Salvador | 2–0 | 2–0 | 2026–27 CONCACAF Nations League A |

== Honours ==
=== Portmore United ===
- Jamaica Premier League (2): 2017–18, 2018–19
- Caribbean Club Championship (1): 2019

=== Saprissa ===
- 2022–23 Liga FPD (2): Clausura 2023, Apertura 2023

=== Hapoel Beer Sheva ===
- Israeli Premier League (1): 2025–26
