= A.D. Guanacasteca =

Costa Rican football team

Guanacasteca
- Full name: Asociación Deportiva Guanacasteca
- Nicknames: Pamperos; ADG
- Founded: January 3, 1973; 53 years ago 2004 (refounded)
- Stadium: Estadio Chorotega
- Capacity: 4,500
- Chairman: Jorge Arias
- Coach: Mauricio Soria
- League: Liga FPD (Disqualified)
- 2025–26 cycle: Disqualified (Licensing issues)
- Website: www.unafut.com/team/guanacasteca/
Home colours	Away colours

Asociación Deportiva Guanacasteca is a Costa Rican football team based in Nicoya, Guanacaste. Historically a consistent competitor in the Primera División de Costa Rica, the club was disqualified from the 2025–26 Liga FPD season due to administrative and licensing irregularities.

Their home stadium is Estadio Chorotega, known for its intense atmosphere in the Nicoya region. Despite their exclusion from the 2026 Clausura tournament, the club remains an active member of the Costa Rican football structure pending legal resolution of their license.

== History ==
=== Origins ===
The club was founded on 1973 after amateur team Carrillo FC, that won the 1972 third division amateur championship, the team relocated to Nicoya in order to sign local players to be ready for the Second Division promotional round, also renaming the team as Selección de Nicoya, and winning the promotional round.

=== First Era ===
After three years the club wins the 1976 Second Division and the First Division promotion, returning in 1978 to second division; In 1986 returned to First Division led by Benigno Guido and finishing top 5. By late 90s the team was sold to Italian club Perugia owners for a short time and resold to other Italian businessmen, under this management the team crowned two more Second Division titles (1995 and 2002); By 2004 the team was sold to local businessmen and relocated to Escazú, renaming as Brujas de Escazú Witches, looking for a higher fan support.

=== Re-establishment ===
Months later, the club was re-established after buying Ciudad Colón second division franchise and relocated to Nicoya for the 2005 season; After 17 years, on May 27, 2021, they clinched their fifth Second Division title by defeating Puntarenas F.C.

=== Licensing issues and 2026 disqualification ===
In late 2025, the club's tenure in the top flight was halted due to administrative complications. On 15 December 2025, the Licensing Committee of the Costa Rican Football Federation (FCRF) confirmed that Guanacasteca, along with Santos de Guápiles, failed to meet the financial and infrastructural requirements necessary to maintain their professional license. As a result, the team was officially disqualified from participating in the 2026 Liga FPD Clausura season, reducing the league to 10 teams for that cycle. This ruling sparked significant controversy in the Guanacaste region, with the club's board of directors pursuing legal appeals to reinstate their status for future tournaments.

== Crest and colors ==
=== Kit suppliers and shirt sponsors ===
Period	Kit manufacturer	Shirt sponsor
2021-	(Canada) Eletto Sport	(Costa Rica) Telecable (Costa Rica) Condovac
2021-	(Canada) Eletto Sport	(Costa Rica) Banco Nacional (United States) B1 Nutrition (Mexico) Electrolit

== Stadium ==
The stadium is located in the Chorotega neighborhood of Nicoya, it has a capacity for 4,500 fans comfortably seated, additional has two bleachers and a large space for standing fans. It has a natural grass in good condition.

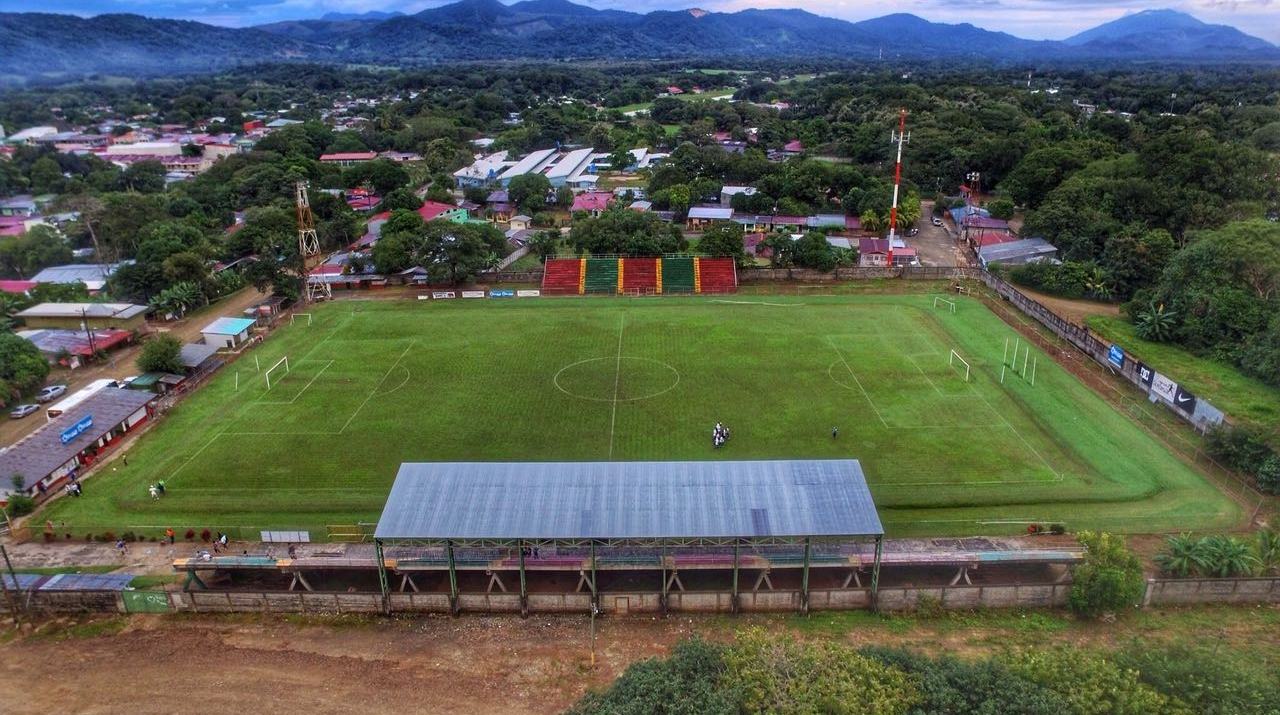
Estadio Chorotega aerial view

Major renovations planned for the 2021 season to meet First Division requirements includes: roof, lighting, new dressing rooms, gym, press room and commercial stands. In addition, the stadium is shared with the Asociación Deportiva Nicoya, women's soccer team of the Women's First Division.

== Current squad ==
As of 24 January, 2024

Note: Flags indicate national team as defined under FIFA eligibility rules; some limited exceptions apply. Players may hold more than one non-FIFA nationality.

No.	Pos.	Nation	Player
2	DF	CRC	Pablo Morera
5	DF	CRC	Yeison Molina
7	MF	CRC	Rodrigo Garita
10	FW	CRC	José Pablo Córdoba
11	MF	CRC	Randy Vega
12	MF	CRC	Josimar Olivero
14	DF	CRC	Greivin Méndez
15	FW	CRC	Gustavo Muñoz
16	MF	CRC	Joseph Bolaños
17	FW	CRC	Steven Williams
18	DF	CRC	Jemark Hernández
19	DF	CRC	Roy Smith
20	DF	CRC	Pedro Leal (Captain)
21	FW	USA	Alonso Hernández
23	DF	CRC	Gael Alpízar

No.	Pos.	Nation	Player
24	MF	CRC	Jose Ugalde
27	MF	CRC	Marvin Esquivel
28	GK	CRC	Jairo Monge
30	MF	CRC	José Porras
31	MF	MEX	Sergio Rodríguez
37	FW	CRC	Ryan Cane
—	GK	MEX	Gibran Lajud
—	DF	CRC	Yael López
—	MF	CRC	Jordy Hernández
—	MF	CRC	Alejandro López
—	MF	URU	Matías Alaniz
—	FW	CRC	José Mora
—	FW	CRC	Johan Venegas
—	FW	CRC	Starling Matarrita
—	FW	MEX	Armando González

=== World Cup players ===
The following players were chosen to represent their country at the FIFA World Cup while contracted to A.D. Guanacasteca.

- (Costa Rica) Brandon Aguilera Zamora (2022)

== Honours ==
=== National ===
- Costa Rica Second Division
  - Champions (5): 1975, 1985, 1995, 2002, 2021
- Costa Rica Third Division
  - Champions (1): 1972

== See also ==
- Brujas F.C.
- Municipal Liberia
