= Costa Rica national football team results (2020–present) =

This article provides details of international football games played by the Costa Rica national team from 2020 to present.

== Results ==
Key
| Win |
| Draw |
| Defeat |

=== 2020 ===
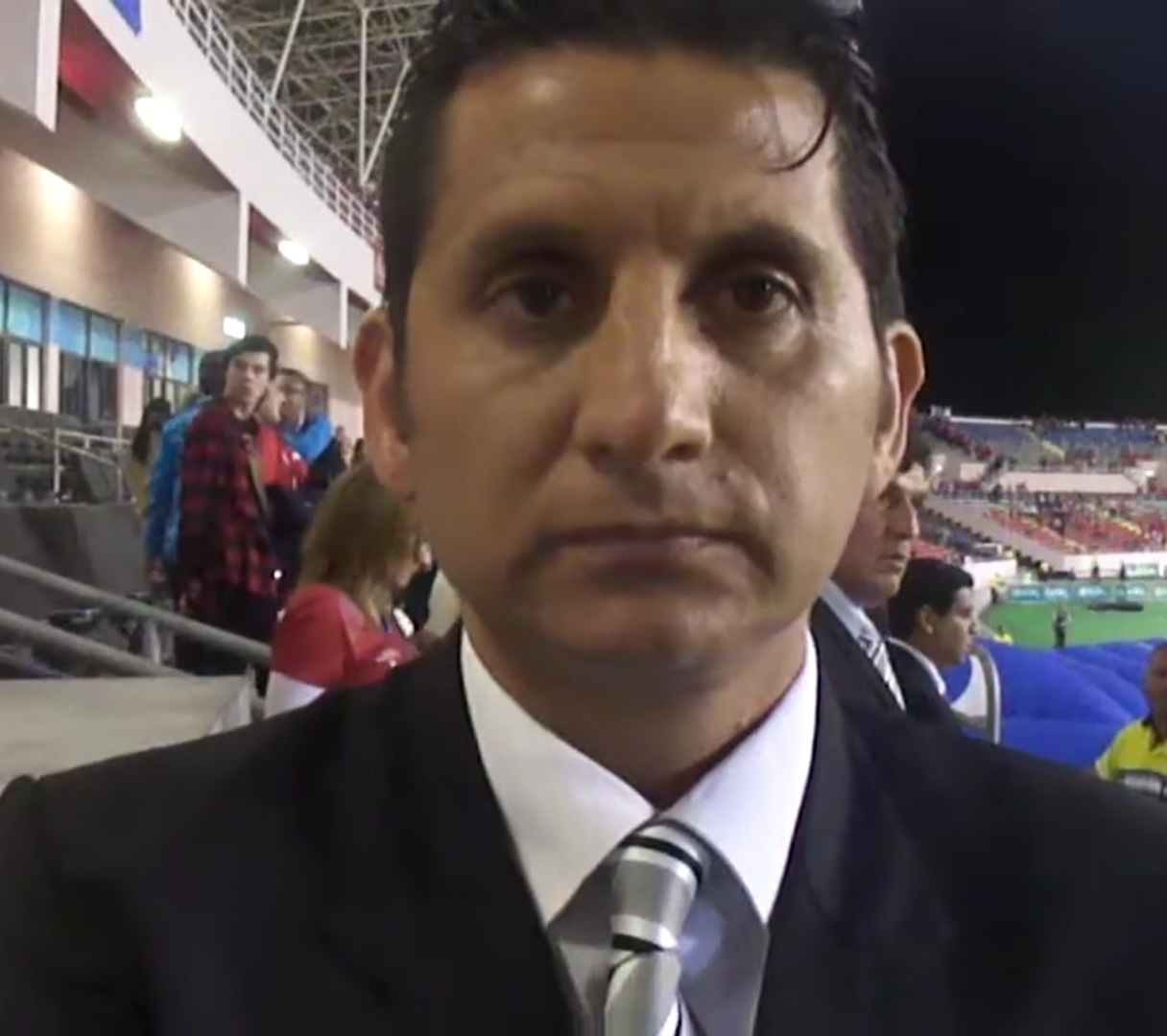
Rónald González faced strong criticism for the team's lackluster performance during the year

Costa Rica began the decade with the struggles they were facing since their lackluster performance at the 2018 FIFA World Cup. 2020 began with a defeat against the United States in a friendly. A few days later, Teletica revealed that Costa Rica would face Greece and El Salvador in the United States the next month. The match against El Salvador was cancelled and replaced with a friendly against Panama at the "Fello" Meza stadium, as it would have been the first time in 24 years that Costa Rica played a match in that stadium. However, as coronavirus cases were surging, and its outbreak became a pandemic, both friendlies were cancelled.

As international football activity resumed in October, Costa Rica scheduled two friendly matches at home against Panama, losing both and sparking criticism from Central American media. A month later, Costa Rica drew against Qatar, scoring their first goal of the year, as the team became winless in official matches in 2020. The situation worsened after a last-minute defeat to the Basque Country. Writing for La República, Wálter Herrera pointed that Rónald González was the coach with the worst performance of the last twenty years.

| 1 February 2020 Friendly | United States | 1–0 | Costa Rica | Carson, United States |
| 15:55 UTC−8 | Llanez 50' (pen.) | Report | | Stadium: Dignity Health Sports Park; Attendance: 9,172; Referee: Oshane Nation (Jamaica) |

| 10 October 2020 Friendly | Costa Rica | 0–1 | Panama | San José, Costa Rica |
| 20:00 UTC−6 | | Report | Ayarza 90+2' | Stadium: Estadio Nacional; Attendance: 0 Referee: Keylor Herrera (Costa Rica) |

| 13 October 2020 Friendly | Costa Rica | 0–1 | Panama | San José, Costa Rica |
| 20:00 UTC−6 | | Report | Ayarza 39' | Stadium: Estadio Nacional; Attendance: 0 Referee: Juan Calderón (Costa Rica) |

| 13 November 2020 Friendly | Costa Rica | 1–1 | Qatar | Maria Enzersdorf, Austria |
| 18:00 UTC+1 | Campbell 67' | Report | Al-Haydos 42' (pen.) | Stadium: BSFZ-Arena; Attendance: 0 Referee: Sebastian Gishamer (Austria) |

| 16 November 2020 Friendly | Basque Country | 2–1 | Costa Rica | Eibar, Spain |
| 20:45 UTC+1 | Muniain 12'; Núñez 90+4' | Report | Moya 70' | Stadium: Ipurua Municipal Stadium; Referee: Ricardo de Burgos Bengoetxea (Spain) |

Statistics

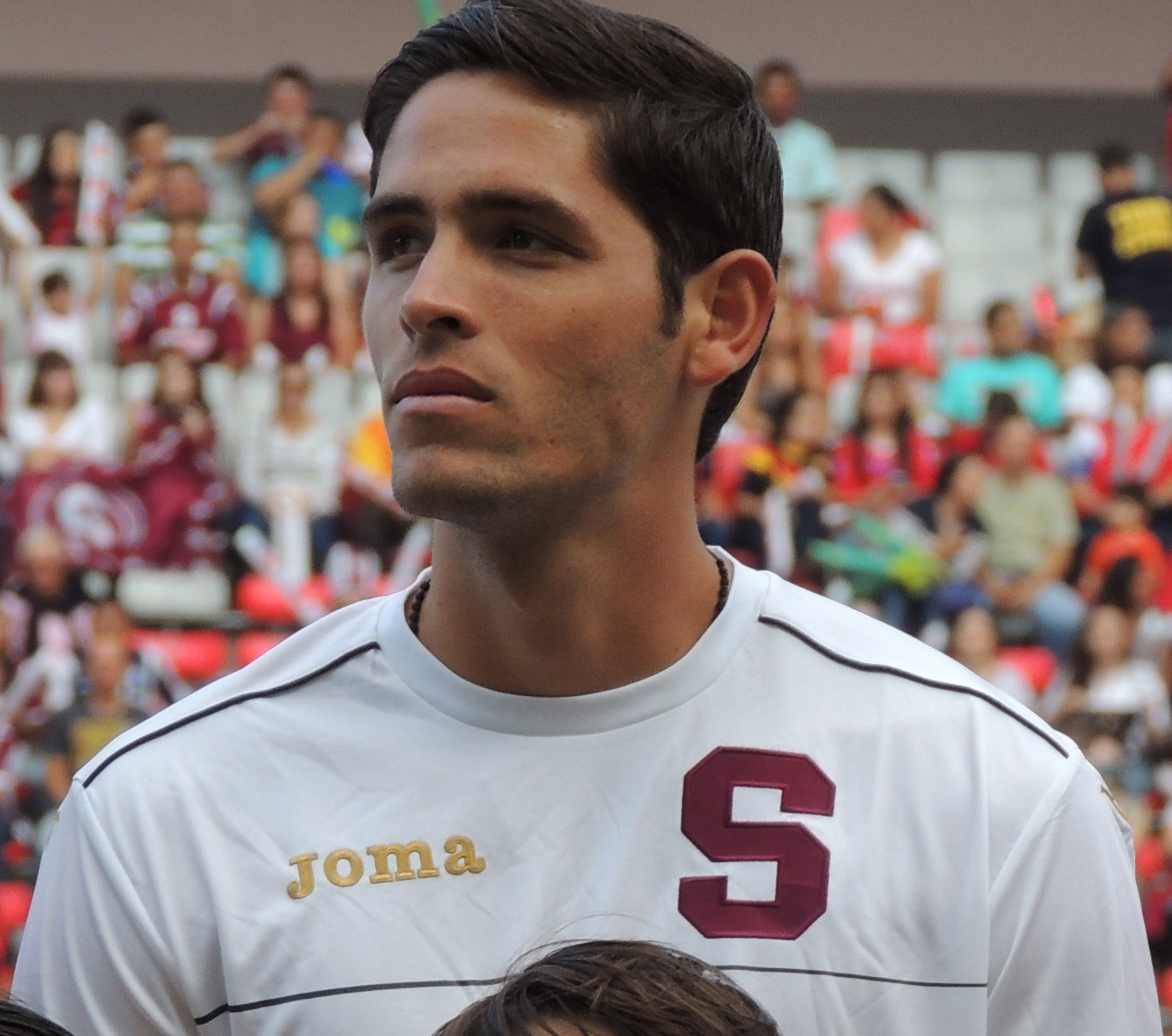
Jonathan Moya was one of the two goalscorers of the year

| Competition | Pld | W | D | L | GF | GA |
|---|---|---|---|---|---|---|
| Friendlies | 5 | 0 | 1 | 4 | 2 | 6 |

Coaches

| # | Nat | Coach | Matches |
|---|---|---|---|
| 1 | (Costa Rica) | Rónald González | 5 (all) |

Goalscorers

| Player | Goals |
|---|---|
| Joel Campbell | 1 |
| Jonathan Moya | 1 |

=== 2021 ===
In 2021, Costa Rica resumed their winless streak under Rónald González as head coach. In March, a European tour delivered a draw against Bosnia and Herzegovina and a loss against Mexico. Three months later, as part of the 2021 CONCACAF Nations League Finals, Costa Rica was yet again unable to defeat Mexico, reaching a scoreless draw but losing in the penalty shoot-outs. Costa Rica then played the third place play-off against rivals Honduras, which ended in a 2–2 draw, again losing in the penalty shoot-outs and finishing fourth, thus increasing the frustrations within the surroundings of the team.

Days later, González was sacked by the Costa Rican Football Federation after a 4–0 defeat in a friendly against the United States. The Federation then signed Colombian coach Luis Fernando Suárez, two weeks before the 2021 CONCACAF Gold Cup. By defeating Guadeloupe, Suriname, and Jamaica, Costa Rica won all nine points in a CONCACAF Gold Cup group stage for the first time in its history. However, Costa Rica lost against Canada at the quarter-finals.

Controversy began engulfing Suarez's stint in the beginning of the third round of CONCACAF's qualifiers for the 2022 FIFA World Cup. After a scoreless draw as visitors against Panama, Suárez decided to leave young forward Manfred Ugalde as a substitute in the following games at home against Mexico and Jamaica. Suárez claimed that his decision was due to Ugalde "losing most duels" against the Panamanians, despite being contradicted by a Costa Rican statistician. Bewildered by Suárez's declarations, Ugalde decided to quit the national team and not return as long as Suárez remained as coach, citing that he felt "exposed" and "disqualified" by the coach. Days later, defender Giancarlo González also stepped aside from the national team, citing his desire to make way for younger players. A month later, González stated that his decision was actually a definitive retirement from the national team, explaining that he did not feel in the condition to play for the team.

Costa Rica had a complicated start of the qualifying process. During the first half of the CONCACAF qualification third round, Costa Rica stood fifth at only six points out of twenty-one, five points behind Panama, then the fourth-placed team. The second half of the round began on 16 November 2021; that night, as Costa Rica was drawing a home match against Honduras, their gap against the Panamanians almost increased to seven points; however, a late goal by Gerson Torres gave a crucial victory for the Ticos, which would start a comeback for the team that extended through 2022.

| 27 March 2021 Friendly | Bosnia and Herzegovina | 0–0 | Costa Rica | Zenica, Bosnia and Herzegovina |
| 18:00 UTC+1 | | Report | | Stadium: Bilino Polje; Referee: Nejc Kajtazovič (Slovenia) |

| 30 March 2021 Friendly | Costa Rica | 0–1 | Mexico | Wiener Neustadt, Austria |
| 14:00 UTC+2 | | Report | Lozano 89' | Stadium: Stadion Wiener Neustadt; Referee: Christian-Petru Ciochirca (Austria) |

| 3 June 2021 2021 Nations League SF | Mexico | 0–0 (5–4 p) | Costa Rica | Denver, United States |
| 20:30 UTC−5 | | Report | | Stadium: Empower Field at Mile High; Attendance: 34,451; Referee: Bryan López (Guatemala) |
| | Penalties |
| | Antuna (penalty missed); Lozano (penalty scored); Pineda (penalty scored); Pulido (penalty scored); Romo (penalty scored); Gallardo (penalty scored) | | (penalty scored) Venegas; (penalty missed) Duarte; (penalty scored) Alfaro; (penalty scored) Lassiter; (penalty scored) Calvo; (penalty missed) Cruz |

| 6 June 2021 2021 Nations League 3rd | Honduras | 2–2 (5–4 p) | Costa Rica | Denver, United States |
| 16:30 UTC−5 | E. Rodríguez 48'; Elis 80' | Report | Campbell 8'; Calvo 85' | Stadium: Empower Field at Mile High; Attendance: 37,648; Referee: Reon Radix (Grenada) |
| | Penalties |
| | A. López (penalty scored); Elis (penalty scored); Benguché (penalty scored); Toro (penalty missed); Acosta (penalty scored); Alvarado (penalty scored) | | (penalty scored) Venegas; (penalty scored) Calvo; (penalty missed) Lassiter; (penalty scored) Torres; (penalty scored) Mora; (penalty missed) Tejeda |

| 9 June 2021 Friendly | United States | 4–0 | Costa Rica | Sandy, United States |
| 19:00 UTC−6 | Aaronson 8'; Dike 42'; Cannon 52'; Reyna 77' (pen.) | Report | | Stadium: Rio Tinto Stadium; Attendance: 19,007; Referee: Tristley Bassue (St. Kitts and Nevis) |

| 12 July 2021 2021 Gold Cup GS | Costa Rica | 3–1 | Guadeloupe | Orlando, United States |
| 21:00 UTC−4 | Campbell 6'; Lassiter 21'; Borges 70' | Report | Mirval 45+5' | Stadium: Exploria Stadium; Attendance: 6,403; Referee: Ismail Elfath (United States) |

| 16 July 2021 2021 Gold Cup GS | Suriname | 1–2 | Costa Rica | Orlando, United States |
| 20:30 UTC−4 | Vlijter 54' | Report | Campbell 58'; Borges 59' | Stadium: Exploria Stadium; Attendance: 6,527; Referee: Fernando Hernández (Mexico) |

| 20 July 2021 2021 Gold Cup GS | Costa Rica | 1–0 | Jamaica | Orlando, United States |
| 19:00 UTC−4 (Note: The match was stopped after two minutes of play due to thunderstorms in the area. It was resumed at 21:20 EDT (UTC−4).) | Ruiz 53' | Report | | Stadium: Exploria Stadium; Attendance: 10,264; Referee: Mario Escobar (Guatemala) |

| 25 July 2021 2021 Gold Cup QF | Costa Rica | 0–2 | Canada | Arlington, United States |
| 18:00 UTC−5 | | Report | Hoilett 18'; Eustáquio 68' | Stadium: AT&T Stadium; Attendance: 41,318; Referee: Jair Marrufo (United States) |

| 21 August 2021 Friendly | El Salvador | 0–0 | Costa Rica | Carson, United States |
| 20:00 UTC−7 | | Report | | Stadium: Dignity Health Sports Park; Referee: Rubiel Vazquez (United States) |

| 2 September 2021 2022 World Cup qualification | Panama | 0–0 | Costa Rica | Panama City, Panama |
| 20:05 UTC−5 | | Report | | Stadium: Estadio Rommel Fernández; Attendance: 14,000; Referee: Iván Barton (El Salvador) |

| 5 September 2021 2022 World Cup qualification | Costa Rica | 0–1 | Mexico | San José, Costa Rica |
| 17:00 UTC−6 | | Report | Pineda 45+1' (pen.) | Stadium: Estadio Nacional; Attendance: 3,000; Referee: Ismail Elfath (United States) |

| 8 September 2021 2022 World Cup qualification | Costa Rica | 1–1 | Jamaica | San José, Costa Rica |
| 19:00 UTC−6 | Marín 3' | Report | Nicholson 47' | Stadium: Estadio Nacional; Attendance: 3,000; Referee: Drew Fischer (Canada) |

| 7 October 2021 2022 World Cup qualification | Honduras | 0–0 | Costa Rica | San Pedro Sula, Honduras |
| 18:05 UTC−6 | | Report | | Stadium: Estadio Olímpico Metropolitano; Attendance: 19,000; Referee: Mario Escobar (Guatemala) |

| 10 October 2021 2022 World Cup qualification | Costa Rica | 2–1 | El Salvador | San José, Costa Rica |
| 16:00 UTC−6 | Ruiz 52'; Borges 58' (pen.) | Report | Henríquez 12' | Stadium: Estadio Nacional; Attendance: 5,000; Referee: Said Martínez (Honduras) |

| 12 October 2021 2022 World Cup qualification | United States | 2–1 | Costa Rica | Columbus, United States |
| 19:00 UTC−4 | Dest 25'; Moreira 66' (o.g.) | Report | Fuller 1' | Stadium: Lower.com Field; Attendance: 20,165; Referee: Daneon Parchment (Jamaica) |

| 12 November 2021 2022 World Cup qualification | Canada | 1–0 | Costa Rica | Edmonton, Canada |
| 19:05 UTC−7 | David 57' | Report | | Stadium: Commonwealth Stadium; Attendance: 48,806; Referee: Ismail Elfath (United States) |

| 16 November 2021 2022 World Cup qualification | Costa Rica | 2–1 | Honduras | San José, Costa Rica |
| 19:05 UTC−6 | Duarte 20'; Torres 90+5' | Report | Quioto 35' | Stadium: Estadio Nacional; Attendance: 5,000; Referee: Jair Marrufo (United States) |

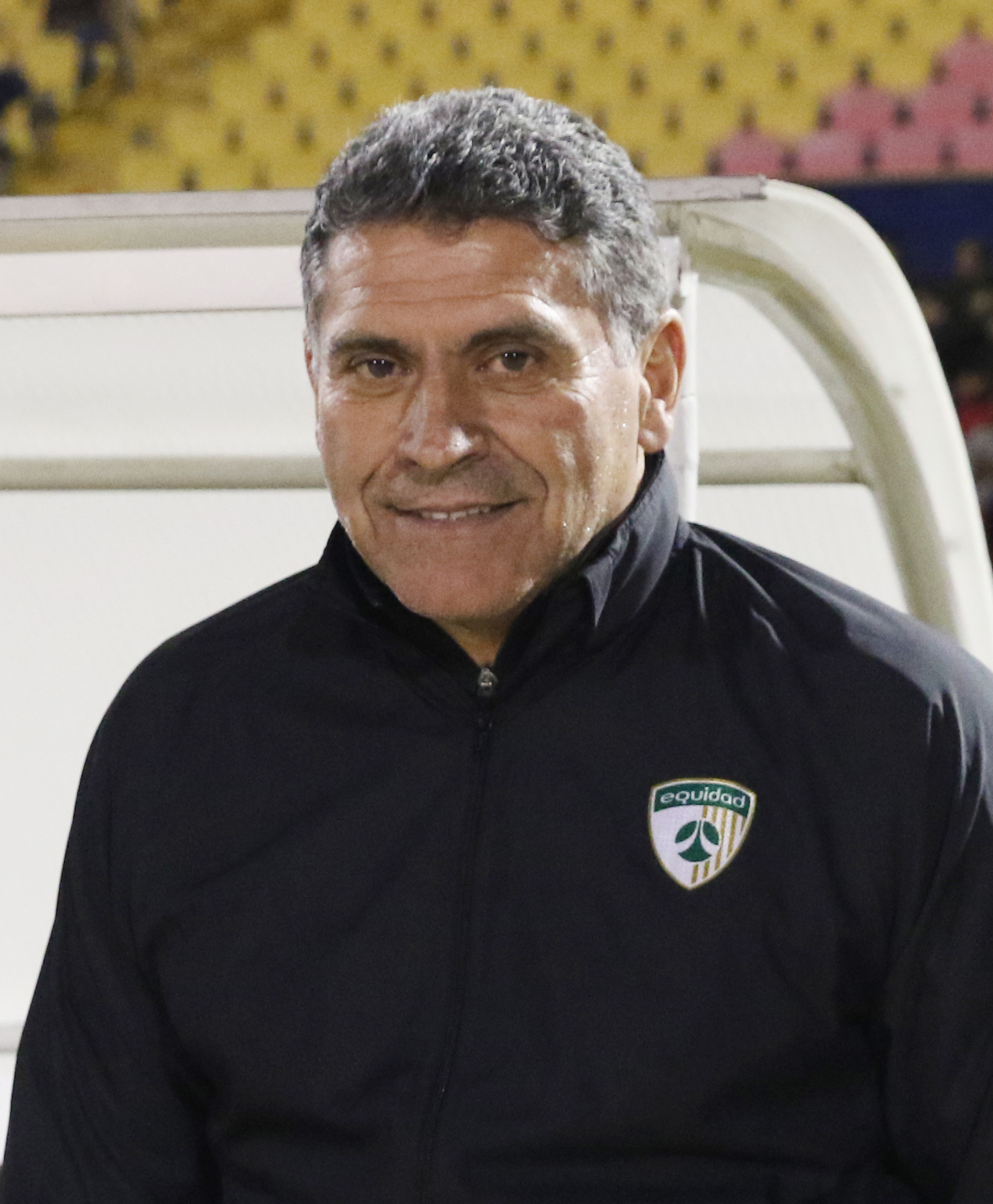
Luis Fernando Suárez was appointed as coach before the 2021 CONCACAF Gold Cup

Statistics

| Competition | Pld | W | D | L | GF | GA |
|---|---|---|---|---|---|---|
| CONCACAF Nations League Finals | 2 | 0 | 2 | 0 | 2 | 2 |
| CONCACAF Gold Cup | 4 | 3 | 0 | 1 | 6 | 4 |
| 2022 FIFA World Cup qualification | 8 | 2 | 3 | 3 | 6 | 7 |
| Friendlies | 4 | 0 | 2 | 2 | 0 | 5 |
| Total | 18 | 5 | 7 | 6 | 14 | 18 |

Coaches

| # | Nat | Coach | Matches |
|---|---|---|---|
| 1 | (Costa Rica) | Rónald González | 5 (1 to 5) |
| 2 | (Colombia) | Luis Fernando Suárez | 13 (6 onwards) |

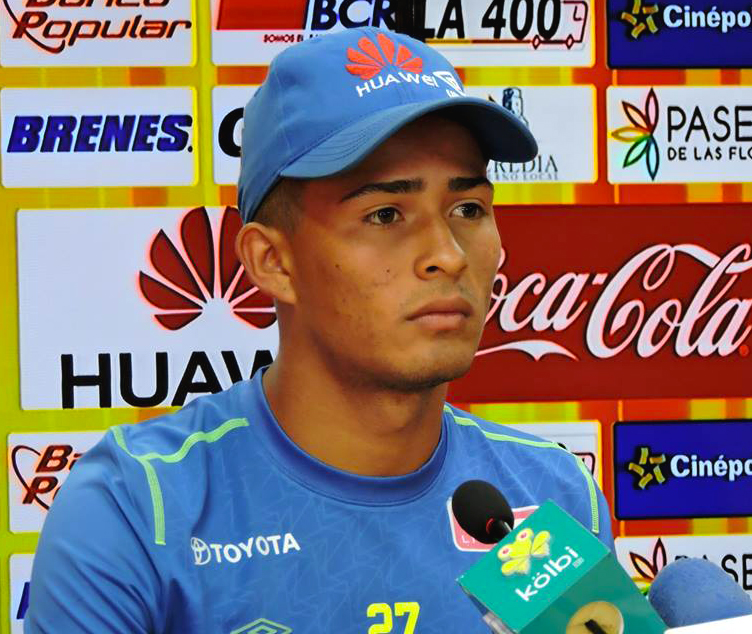
Costa Rica's last goal of the year, scored by Gerson Torres against Honduras, began a comeback for the team in the road to Qatar

Goalscorers

| # | Player | Goals |
|---|---|---|
| 1 | Celso Borges | 3 |
| 1 | Joel Campbell | 3 |
| 3 | Bryan Ruiz | 2 |
| 4 | Francisco Calvo | 1 |
| 4 | Óscar Duarte | 1 |
| 4 | Keysher Fuller | 1 |
| 4 | Ariel Lassiter | 1 |
| 4 | Jimmy Marín | 1 |
| 4 | Gerson Torres | 1 |

=== 2022 ===
| 27 January 2022 2022 World Cup qualification | Costa Rica | 1–0 | Panama | San José, Costa Rica |
| 20:05 UTC−6 | Ruiz 65' | Report | | Stadium: Estadio Nacional; Attendance: 21,000; Referee: Ismail Elfath (United States) |

| 30 January 2022 2022 World Cup qualification | Mexico | 0–0 | Costa Rica | Mexico City, Mexico |
| 17:00 UTC−6 | | Report | | Stadium: Estadio Azteca; Attendance: 2,000; Referee: Said Martínez (Honduras) |

| 2 February 2022 2022 World Cup qualification | Jamaica | 0–1 | Costa Rica | Kingston, Jamaica |
| 19:00 UTC−5 | | Report | Campbell 62' | Stadium: Independence Park; Referee: Jair Marrufo (United States) |

| 24 March 2022 2022 World Cup qualification | Costa Rica | 1–0 | Canada | San José, Costa Rica |
| 20:05 UTC−6 | Borges 45+1' | Report | | Stadium: Estadio Nacional; Referee: Said Martínez (Honduras) |

| 27 March 2022 2022 World Cup qualification | El Salvador | 1–2 | Costa Rica | San Salvador, El Salvador |
| 15:05 UTC−6 | Gil 31' | Report | Contreras 30'; Campbell 45+1' | Stadium: Estadio Cuscatlán; Referee: Daneon Parchment (Jamaica) |

| 30 March 2022 2022 World Cup qualification | Costa Rica | 2–0 | United States | San José, Costa Rica |
| 19:05 UTC−6 | Vargas 51'; Contreras 59' | Report | | Stadium: Estadio Nacional; Attendance: 35,000; Referee: Drew Fischer (Canada) |

| 2 June 2022 2022–23 Nations League | Panama | 2–0 | Costa Rica | Panama City, Panama |
| 18:30 UTC−5 | Díaz 52'; Waterman 76' | Report | | Stadium: Estadio Rommel Fernández; Referee: Fernando Hernández (Mexico) |

| 5 June 2022 2022–23 Nations League | Costa Rica | 2–0 | Martinique | San José, Costa Rica |
| 11:00 UTC−6 | Campbell 28'; Calvo 88' | Report | | Stadium: Estadio Nacional; Referee: Walter López (Guatemala) |

| 14 June 2022 2022 World Cup inter-confederation play-offs | Costa Rica | 1–0 | New Zealand | Al Rayyan, Qatar |
| 21:00 UTC+3 | Campbell 3' | Report | | Stadium: Ahmad bin Ali Stadium; Referee: Mohammed Abdulla Hassan Mohamed (United Arab Emirates) |

| 23 September 2022 Friendly | South Korea | 2–2 | Costa Rica | Goyang, South Korea |
| 20:00 UTC+9 | Hwang Hee-chan 28'; Son Heung-min 85' | Report | Bennette 41', 63' | Stadium: Goyang Stadium; Attendance: 37,581; Referee: Alex King (Australia) |

| 27 September 2022 Friendly | Uzbekistan | 1–2 | Costa Rica | Suwon, South Korea |
| 15:00 UTC+9 | Shomurodov 25' | Report | Hernández 90+2'; Waston 90+4' | Stadium: Suwon World Cup Stadium; Referee: Kim Dae-Yong (South Korea) |

| 9 November 2022 Friendly | Costa Rica | 2–0 | Nigeria | San José, Costa Rica |
| 20:00 UTC−6 | Duarte 7'; Waston 73' | Report | | Stadium: Estadio Nacional; Referee: Fernando Hernández (Mexico) |

| 17 November 2022 Friendly | Iraq | Cancelled | Costa Rica | Basra, Iraq |
| 17:00 UTC+3 | | Report | | Stadium: Basra International Stadium |

| 23 November 2022 2022 World Cup GS | Spain | 7–0 | Costa Rica | Doha, Qatar |
| 19:00 UTC+3 | Olmo 11'; Asensio 21'; F. Torres 31' (pen.), 54'; Gavi 74'; Soler 90'; Morata 90+2' | Report | | Stadium: Al Thumama Stadium; Attendance: 40,013; Referee: Mohammed Abdulla Hassan Mohamed (United Arab Emirates) |

| 27 November 2022 2022 World Cup GS | Japan | 0–1 | Costa Rica | Al Rayyan, Qatar |
| 13:00 UTC+3 | | Report | Fuller 81' | Stadium: Ahmad bin Ali Stadium; Attendance: 41,479; Referee: Michael Oliver (England) |

| 1 December 2022 2022 World Cup GS | Costa Rica | 2–4 | Germany | Al Khor, Qatar |
| 20:00 UTC+3 | Tejeda 58'; Vargas 70' | Report | Gnabry 10'; Havertz 73', 85'; Füllkrug 89' | Stadium: Al Bayt Stadium; Attendance: 67,054; Referee: Stéphanie Frappart (France) |

Statistics

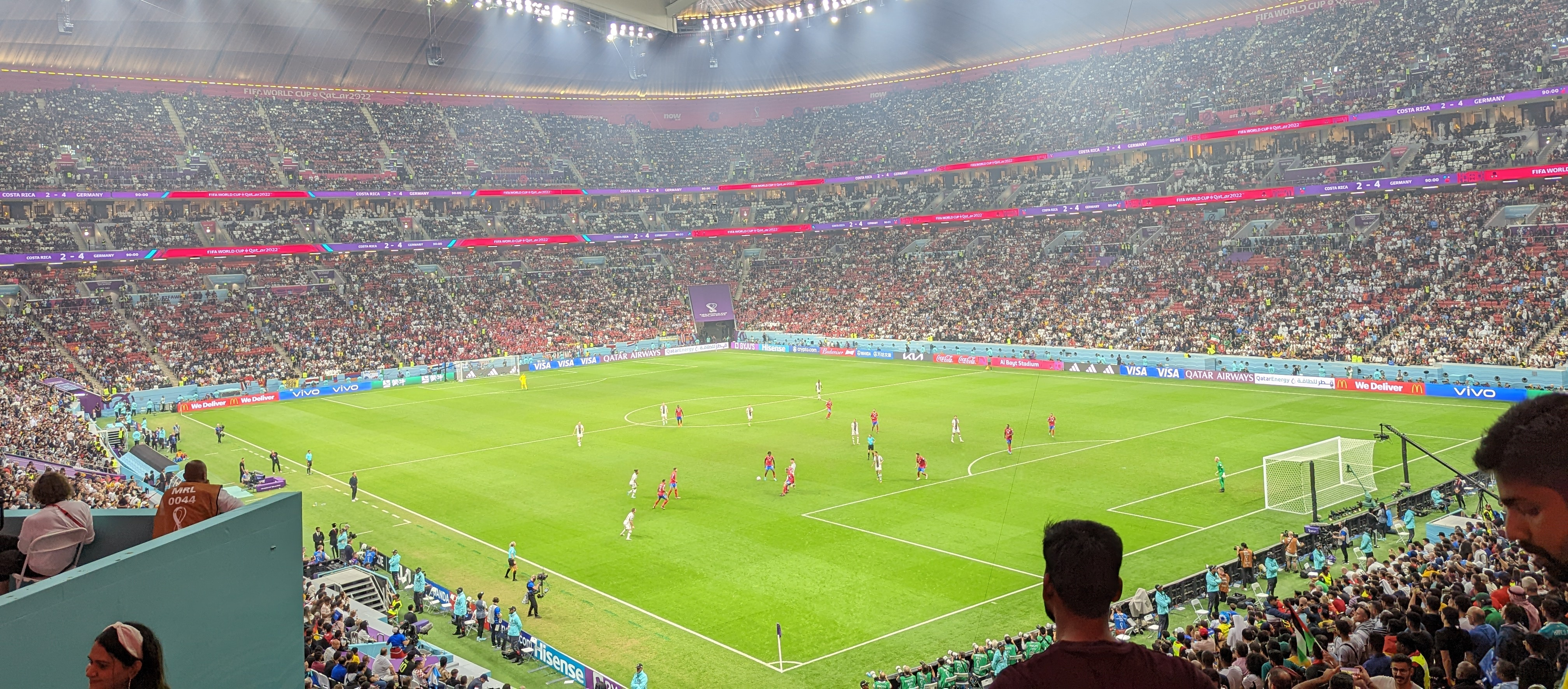
Costa Rica facing Germany at the 2022 FIFA World Cup

| Competition | Pld | W | D | L | GF | GA |
|---|---|---|---|---|---|---|
| FIFA World Cup qualification | 7 | 6 | 1 | 0 | 8 | 1 |
| CONCACAF Nations League | 2 | 1 | 0 | 1 | 2 | 2 |
| FIFA World Cup | 3 | 1 | 0 | 2 | 3 | 11 |
| Friendlies | 3 | 2 | 1 | 0 | 6 | 3 |
| Total | 15 | 10 | 2 | 3 | 19 | 17 |

Coaches

| Nat | Coach | Matches |
|---|---|---|
| (Colombia) | Luis Fernando Suárez | 15 (all) |

Goalscorers

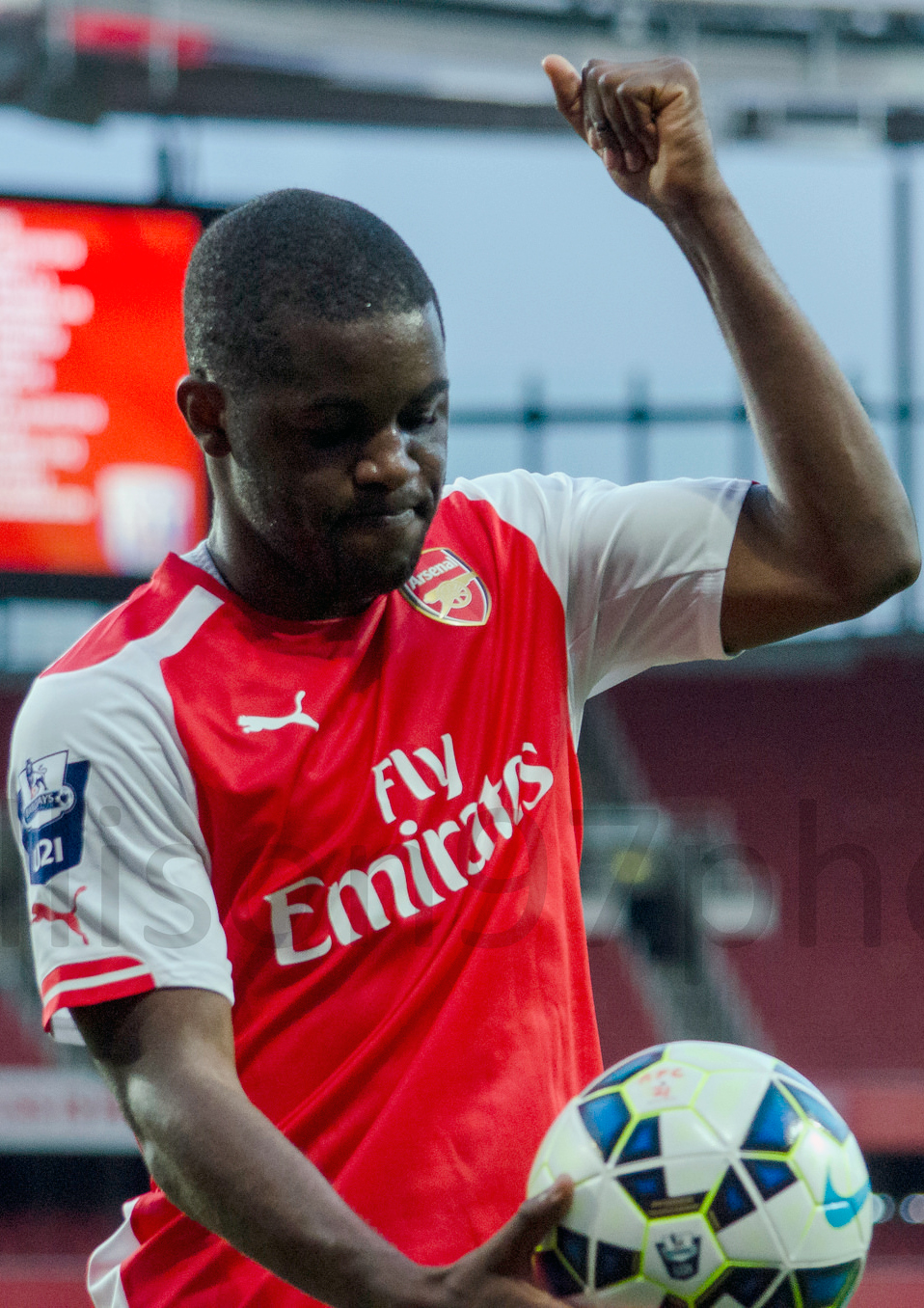
Joel Campbell was the top scorer of the year, with four goals, the last of which helped Costa Rica qualify to the 2022 FIFA World Cup

| # | Player | Goals |
|---|---|---|
| 1 | Joel Campbell | 4 |
| 2 | Jewison Bennette | 2 |
| 2 | Anthony Contreras | 2 |
| 2 | Juan Pablo Vargas | 2 |
| 2 | Kendall Waston | 2 |
| 6 | Celso Borges | 1 |
| 6 | Francisco Calvo | 1 |
| 6 | Óscar Duarte | 1 |
| 6 | Keysher Fuller | 1 |
| 6 | Anthony Hernández | 1 |
| 6 | Bryan Ruiz | 1 |
| 6 | Yeltsin Tejeda | 1 |

=== 2023 ===
| 25 March 2023 2022–23 Nations League | Martinique | 1–2 | Costa Rica | Fort-de-France, Martinique |
| 19:00 UTC−4 | Biron 18' | Report | Suárez 88'; Contreras 90+2' | Stadium: Stade Pierre Aliker; Referee: Drew Fischer (Canada) |

| 28 March 2023 2022–23 Nations League | Costa Rica | 0–1 | Panama | San José, Costa Rica |
| 20:00 UTC−6 | | Report | Fajardo 77' | Stadium: Estadio Nacional; Referee: César Ramos (Mexico) |

| 15 June 2023 Friendly | Costa Rica | 0–1 | Guatemala | Carson, United States |
| 20:00 UTC−7 | | Report | Mejía 6' | Stadium: Dignity Health Sports Park; Referee: Nima Saghafi (United States) |

| 20 June 2023 Friendly | Costa Rica | 1–3 | Ecuador | Chester, United States |
| 20:00 UTC−4 | Campbell 66' | Report | Valencia 20'; Pacho 57'; Vite 82' | Stadium: Subaru Park; Attendance: 10,000; Referee: Víctor Cáceres (Mexico) |

| 26 June 2023 2023 Gold Cup GS | Costa Rica | 1–2 | Panama | Fort Lauderdale, United States |
| 18:30 UTC−4 | Suárez 90+1' | Report | Fajardo 23'; Bárcenas 68' | Stadium: DRV PNK Stadium; Attendance: 10,101; Referee: Drew Fischer (Canada) |

| 30 June 2023 2023 Gold Cup GS | El Salvador | 0–0 | Costa Rica | Harrison, United States |
| 20:30 UTC−4 | | Report | | Stadium: Red Bull Arena; Attendance: 22,615; Referee: César Ramos (Mexico) |

| 4 July 2023 2023 Gold Cup GS | Costa Rica | 6–4 | Martinique | Harrison, United States |
| 20:30 UTC−4 | Waston 10'; Calvo 41'; Vargas 55'; Campbell 59' (pen.); Contreras 68'; Campos 90' | Report | Burner 18', 79'; Labeau 75' (pen.); Mexique 90+3' | Stadium: Red Bull Arena; Attendance: 21,531; Referee: Bryan López (Guatemala) |

| 8 July 2023 2023 Gold Cup QF | Mexico | 2–0 | Costa Rica | Arlington, United States |
| 20:30 UTC−5 | Pineda 52' (pen.); É. Sánchez 87' | Report | | Stadium: AT&T Stadium; Attendance: 60,355; Referee: Saíd Martínez (Honduras) |

| 8 September 2023 Friendly | Saudi Arabia | 1–3 | Costa Rica | Newcastle, England |
| 20:00 UTC+1 | Al-Bulayhi 68' | Report | Calvo 12'; Ugalde 32'; Leal 89' | Stadium: St James' Park; Referee: John Brooks (England) |

| 12 September 2023 Friendly | Costa Rica | 1–4 | United Arab Emirates | Zaprešić, Croatia |
| 18:00 UTC+2 | Cascante 64' | Report | Al-Ghassani 16', 53'; Canedo 23'; Salmeen 38' | Stadium: Ivan Laljak-Ivić Stadium; Referee: Ante Čulina (Croatia) |

| 16 November 2023 2023–24 Nations League QF | Costa Rica | 0–3 | Panama | San José, Costa Rica |
| 21:00 UTC−6 | | Report | Murillo 4'; Fajardo 29'; Waterman 60' | Stadium: Estadio Ricardo Saprissa Aymá; Attendance: 17,787; Referee: Mario Escobar (Guatemala) |

| 20 November 2023 2023–24 Nations League QF | Panama | 3–1 (6–1 agg.) | Costa Rica | Panama City, Panama |
| 21:00 UTC−5 | Fajardo 20'; Rodríguez 23'; Bárcenas 43' (pen.) | Report | Calvo 51' | Stadium: Estadio Rommel Fernández; Attendance: 15,288; Referee: Saíd Martínez (Honduras) |
Note: Panama won 6–1 on aggregate and qualified to the 2024 Copa América. Costa Rica advanced to the play-in.

Statistics

| Competition | Pld | W | D | L | GF | GA |
|---|---|---|---|---|---|---|
| 2022–23 CONCACAF Nations League | 2 | 1 | 0 | 1 | 2 | 2 |
| CONCACAF Gold Cup | 4 | 1 | 1 | 2 | 7 | 8 |
| 2023–24 CONCACAF Nations League | 2 | 0 | 0 | 2 | 1 | 6 |
| Friendlies | 4 | 1 | 0 | 3 | 5 | 9 |
| Total | 12 | 3 | 1 | 9 | 15 | 25 |

Coaches

| # | Nat | Coach | Matches |
|---|---|---|---|
| 1 | (Colombia) | Luis Fernando Suárez | 8 (1–8) |
| 2 | (Argentina) | Claudio Vivas | 2 (9 and 10) |
| 3 | (Argentina) | Gustavo Alfaro | 2 (11 and 12) |

Goalscorers

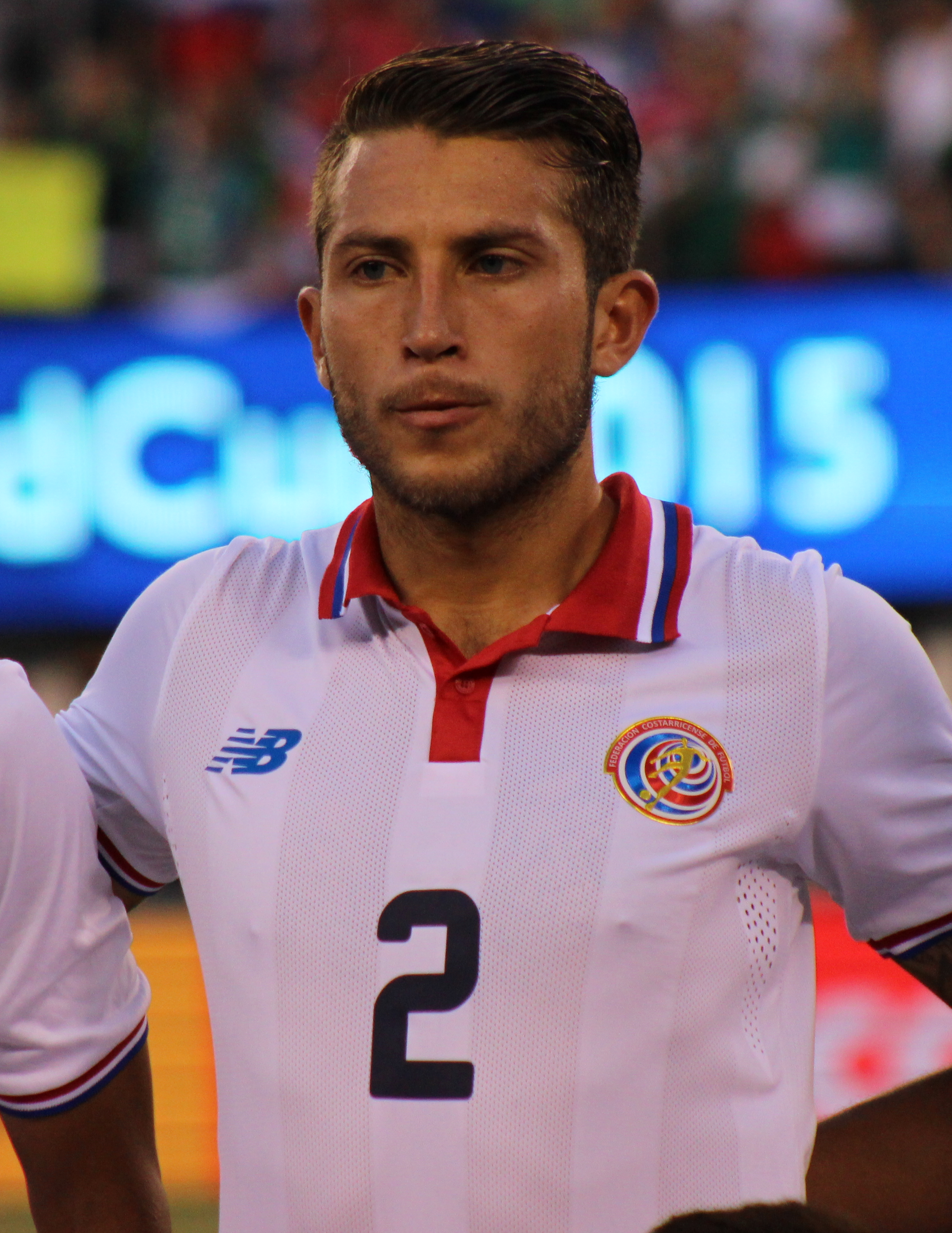
Francisco Calvo was the top scorer of the year

| # | Player | Goals |
|---|---|---|
| 1 | Francisco Calvo | 3 |
| 2 | Joel Campbell | 2 |
| 2 | Anthony Contreras | 2 |
| 2 | Aarón Suárez | 2 |
| 5 | Diego Campos | 1 |
| 5 | Julio Cascante | 1 |
| 5 | Randall Leal | 1 |
| 5 | Manfred Ugalde | 1 |
| 5 | Juan Pablo Vargas | 1 |
| 5 | Kendall Waston | 1 |

=== 2024 ===
| 2 February 2024 Friendly | Costa Rica | 2–0 | El Salvador | San José, Costa Rica |
| 20:00 UTC−6 | Daly 20'; Suárez 70' | Report | | Stadium: Estadio Nacional; Attendance: 13,500; Referee: Steven Madrigal (Costa Rica) |

| 23 March 2024 2024 Copa América qualifying play-offs | Costa Rica | 3–1 | Honduras | Frisco, United States |
| 18:15 UTC−5 | Galo 18'; Madrigal 56'; Brenes 62' | Report | Chirinos 10' | Stadium: Toyota Stadium; Attendance: 15,299; Referee: Ismail Elfath (United States) |
Note: Costa Rica qualified for the 2024 Copa América after winning this game.

| 26 March 2024 Friendly | Argentina | 3–1 | Costa Rica | Los Angeles, United States |
| 20:00 UTC−7 | Di María 52'; Mac Allister 56'; L. Martínez 77' | Report | Ugalde 34' | Stadium: Los Angeles Memorial Coliseum; Attendance: 20,000; Referee: Josef Mickelson (United States) |

| 31 May 2024 Friendly | Costa Rica | 0–0 | Uruguay A' | San José, Costa Rica |
| 20:00 UTC−6 | | Report | | Stadium: Estadio Nacional; Attendance: 15,500; Referee: Óscar Barrera (El Salvador) |

| 6 June 2024 2026 World Cup qualification | Costa Rica | 4–0 | Saint Kitts and Nevis | San José, Costa Rica |
| 20:30 UTC−6 | Galo 40', 49'; Alcócer 82'; Rojas 84' | Report | | Stadium: Estadio Nacional; Attendance: 5,150; Referee: Julio Luna (Guatemala) |

| 9 June 2024 2026 World Cup qualification | Grenada | 0–3 | Costa Rica | St. George's, Grenada |
| 17:30 UTC−4 | | Report | Ugalde 9'; Zamora 34'; Taylor 70' | Stadium: Kirani James Athletic Stadium; Attendance: 2,780; Referee: Steffon Dewar (Jamaica) |

| 24 June 2024 2024 Copa América GS | Brazil | 0–0 | Costa Rica | Inglewood, United States |
| 18:00 UTC−7 | | Report | | Stadium: SoFi Stadium; Attendance: 67,158; Referee: César Arturo Ramos (Mexico) |

| 28 June 2024 2024 Copa América GS | Colombia | 3–0 | Costa Rica | Glendale, United States |
| 15:00 UTC−7 | Díaz 31' (pen.); Sánchez 59'; Córdoba 62' | Report | | Stadium: State Farm Stadium; Attendance: 27,386; Referee: Gustavo Tejera (Uruguay) |

| 2 July 2024 2024 Copa América GS | Costa Rica | 2–1 | Paraguay | Austin, United States |
| 20:00 UTC−5 | Calvo 3'; Alcócer 7' | Report | Sosa 55' | Stadium: Q2 Stadium; Attendance: 12,765; Referee: Yael Falcón (Argentina) |

| 5 September 2024 2024–25 Nations League | Costa Rica | 3–0 | Guadeloupe | San José, Costa Rica |
| 18:00 UTC−6 | Calvo 50'; Lassiter 77'; Madrigal 80' | Report | | Stadium: Estadio Nacional; Attendance: 7,542; Referee: Katia García (Mexico) |

| 9 September 2024 2024–25 Nations League | Guatemala | 0–0 | Costa Rica | Guatemala City, Guatemala |
| 20:00 UTC−6 | | Report | | Stadium: Estadio Doroteo Guamuch Flores; Attendance: 18,115; Referee: Daniel Quintero (Mexico) |

| 11 October 2024 2024–25 Nations League | Suriname | 1–1 | Costa Rica | Paramaribo, Suriname |
| 19:00 UTC−3 | Vlijter 34' | Report | Alcócer 13' | Stadium: Dr. Ir. Franklin Essed Stadion; Attendance: 3,274; Referee: Adonai Escobedo (Mexico) |

| 15 October 2024 2024–25 Nations League | Costa Rica | 3–0 | Guatemala | San José, Costa Rica |
| 18:00 UTC−6 | Madrigal 9'; Vargas 38'; Calvo 71' | Report | | Stadium: Estadio Nacional; Attendance: 20,450; Referee: Joe Dickerson (United States) |

| 14 November 2024 2024–25 Nations League QF | Costa Rica | 0–1 | Panama | San José, Costa Rica |
| 20:00 UTC−6 | | Report | Fajardo 66' (pen.) | Stadium: Estadio Nacional; Attendance: 29,201; Referee: Saíd Martínez (Honduras) |

| 18 November 2024 2024–25 Nations League QF | Panama | 2–2 (3–2 agg.) | Costa Rica | Panama City, Panama |
| 21:00 UTC−5 | Blackman 13'; Rodríguez 45+3' | Report | Bran 24'; Martínez 72' | Stadium: Estadio Rommel Fernández; Attendance: 21,249; Referee: César Ramos (Mexico) |
Note: Panama won 3–2 on aggregate, advanced to the Finals and qualified for the 2025 Gold Cup. Costa Rica advanced to the 2025 Gold Cup qualification.

Statistics

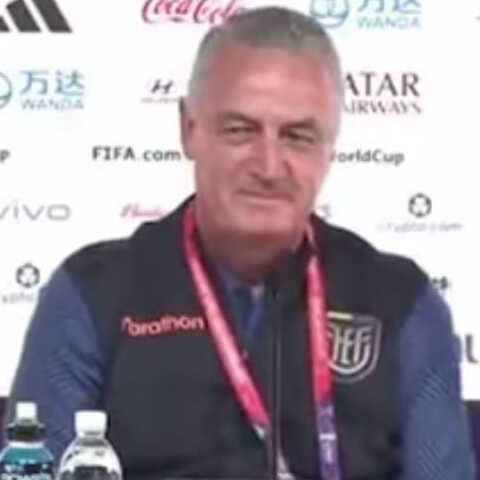
Gustavo Alfaro coached for nine matches before leaving for Paraguay

| Competition | Pld | W | D | L | GF | GA |
|---|---|---|---|---|---|---|
| Copa América qualifying | 1 | 1 | 0 | 0 | 3 | 1 |
| 2026 FIFA World Cup qualification | 2 | 2 | 0 | 0 | 7 | 0 |
| Copa América | 3 | 1 | 1 | 1 | 2 | 4 |
| CONCACAF Nations League | 6 | 2 | 3 | 1 | 9 | 4 |
| Friendlies | 3 | 1 | 1 | 1 | 3 | 3 |
| Total | 15 | 7 | 5 | 3 | 24 | 12 |

Coaches

| # | Nat | Coach | Matches |
|---|---|---|---|
| 1 | (Argentina) | Gustavo Alfaro | 9 (1–9) |
| 2 | (Argentina) | Claudio Vivas | 6 (10–15) |

Goalscorers

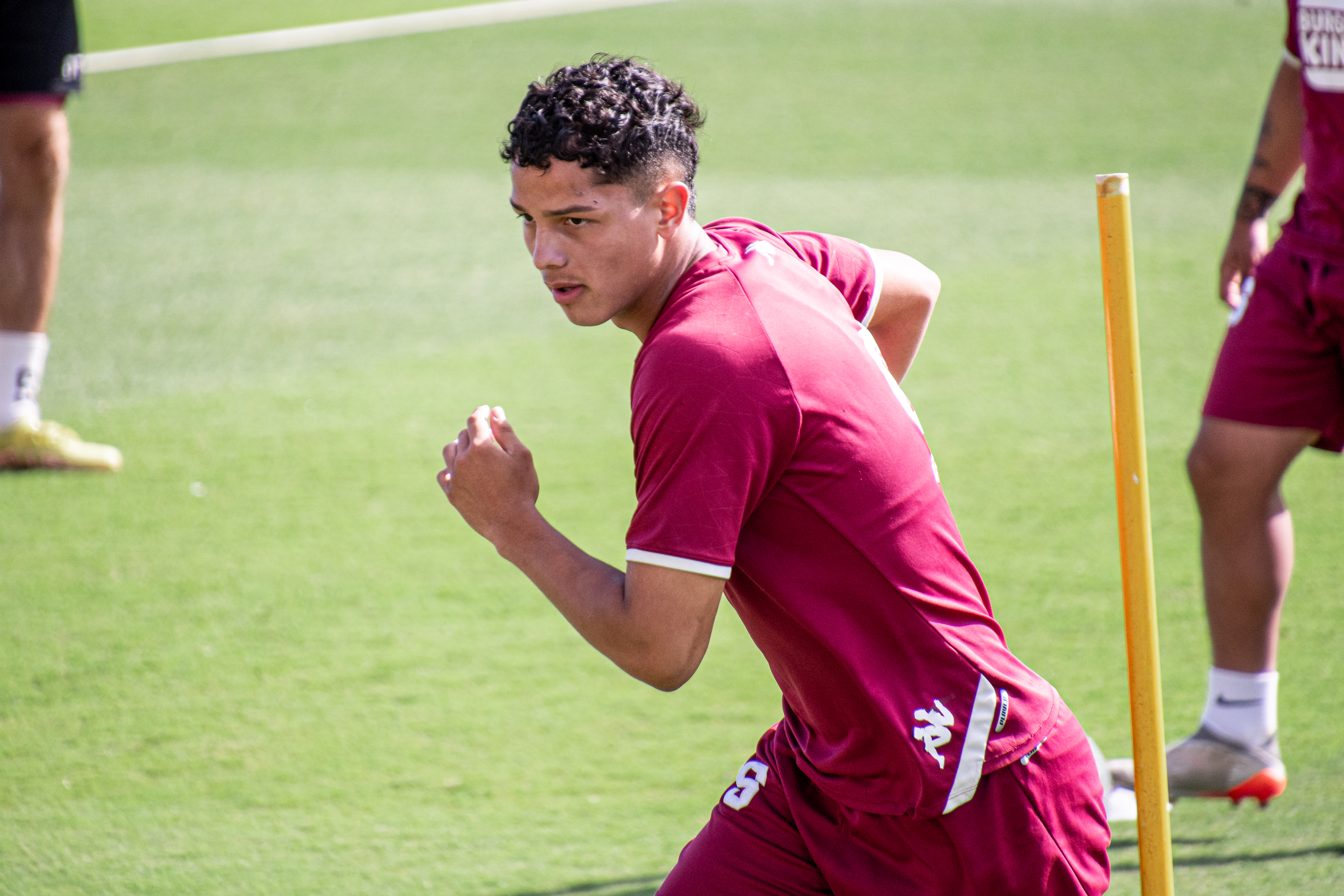
Warren Madrigal was one of the four top goalscorers of the year

| # | Player | Goals |
|---|---|---|
| 1 | Josimar Alcócer | 3 |
| 1 | Francisco Calvo | 3 |
| 1 | Orlando Galo | 3 |
| 1 | Warren Madrigal | 3 |
| 5 | Manfred Ugalde | 2 |
| 6 | Alejandro Bran | 1 |
| 6 | Jefferson Brenes | 1 |
| 6 | Jostin Daly | 1 |
| 6 | Ariel Lassiter | 1 |
| 6 | Alonso Martínez | 1 |
| 6 | Andy Rojas | 1 |
| 6 | Aarón Suárez | 1 |
| 6 | Gerald Taylor | 1 |
| 6 | Kenneth Vargas | 1 |
| 6 | Álvaro Zamora | 1 |

=== 2025 ===
| 22 January 2025 Friendly | United States | 3–0 | Costa Rica | Orlando, United States |
| 19:00 UTC−5 | White 21'; Clark 77'; Agyemang 90' | Report | | Stadium: Inter&Co Stadium; Attendance: 13,580; Referee: Cristhofer Corado (Guatemala) |

| 21 March 2025 2025 Gold Cup qualification | Belize | 0–7 | Costa Rica | Belmopan, Belize |
| 20:00 UTC−6 | | Report | Ugalde 7', 36' (pen.); K. Vargas 38'; Mitchell 65'; Zamora 70', 88'; Alcócer 81' | Stadium: FFB Stadium; Referee: Adonis Carrasco (Dominican Republic) |

| 25 March 2025 2025 Gold Cup qualification | Costa Rica | 6–1 (13–1 agg.) | Belize | San José, Costa Rica |
| 19:00 UTC−6 | Arzú 1' (o.g.); Bran 6', 66'; Martínez 8'; Ugalde 36'; Zamora 69' | Report | Bernárdez 47' | Stadium: Estadio Nacional; Referee: Julio Luna (Guatemala) |
Note: Costa Rica won 13–1 on aggregate and qualified for the Finals.

| 28 May 2025 Friendly | Catalonia | 2–0 | Costa Rica | Sant Joan Despí, Spain |
| 19:00 UTC+2 | A. Roca 71'; Aleñá 89' | Report | | Stadium: Johan Cruyff Stadium; Attendance: 5,352; Referee: Víctor García Verdura (Spain) |

| 7 June 2025 2026 World Cup qualification | Bahamas | 0–8 | Costa Rica | Wildey, Bahamas |
| 19:00 UTC−4 | | Report | Martínez 20'; Mora 37'; Bran 45+2'; Galo 48'; Ugalde 51'; Madrigal 64', 79'; Zamora 90' | Stadium: BFA Technical Centre; Referee: Reon Radix (Grenada) |

| 10 June 2025 2026 World Cup qualification | Costa Rica | 2–1 | Trinidad and Tobago | San José, Costa Rica |
| 19:00 UTC−6 | Mitchell 23'; Madrigal 38' | Report | L. García 58' | Stadium: Estadio Nacional; Referee: Daniel Quintero (Mexico) |

| 15 June 2025 2025 Gold Cup GS | Costa Rica | 4–3 | Suriname | San Diego, United States |
| 20:00 UTC−7 | Martínez 14'; Ugalde 19' (pen.), 90+13' (pen.); Alcócer 76' | Report | Kerk 34'; Margaret 59'; Pinas 64' (pen.) | Stadium: Snapdragon Stadium; Attendance: 7,736; Referee: Joe Dickerson (United States) |

| 18 June 2025 2025 Gold Cup GS | Costa Rica | 2–1 | Dominican Republic | Arlington, United States |
| 18:00 UTC−5 | Ugalde 44' (pen.); Alcócer 85' | Report | Urbáez 16' | Stadium: AT&T Stadium; Attendance: 34,015; Referee: Lukasz Szpala (United States) |

| 22 June 2025 2025 Gold Cup GS | Mexico | 0–0 | Costa Rica | Paradise, United States |
| 19:00 UTC−7 | | Report | | Stadium: Allegiant Stadium; Attendance: 35,000; Referee: Mario Escobar (Guatemala) |

| 29 June 2025 2025 Gold Cup QF | United States | 2–2 (4–3 p) | Costa Rica | Minneapolis, United States |
| 18:00 UTC−5 | Luna 43'; Arfsten 47' | Report | Calvo 12' (pen.); Martínez 71' | Stadium: U.S. Bank Stadium; Attendance: 32,289; Referee: Walter López (Guatemala) |
| | Penalties |
| | Adams (penalty scored); Tillman (penalty scored); Berhalter (penalty missed); Freeman (penalty scored); Tolkin (penalty missed); Downs (penalty scored) | | (penalty scored) Martínez; (penalty missed) J. Vargas; (penalty scored) Van der Putten; (penalty scored) Brenes; (penalty missed) Calvo; (penalty missed) Rojas |

| 5 September 2025 2026 World Cup qualification | Nicaragua | 1–1 | Costa Rica | Managua, Nicaragua |
| 20:00 UTC−6 | Bonilla 80' (pen.) | Report | Gamboa 60' | Stadium: Estadio Nacional; Attendance: 19,532; Referee: Marco Ortiz (Mexico) |

| 9 September 2025 2026 World Cup qualification | Costa Rica | 3–3 | Haiti | San José, Costa Rica |
| 20:00 UTC−6 | K. Vargas 1'; Martínez 35'; J. Vargas 90+1' | Report | Nazon 55', 58', 86' | Stadium: Estadio Nacional; Attendance: 12,000; Referee: Tori Penso (United States) |

| 9 October 2025 2026 World Cup qualification | Honduras | 0–0 | Costa Rica | San Pedro Sula, Honduras |
| 20:00 UTC−6 | | Report | | Stadium: Estadio General Francisco Morazán; Attendance: 15,109; Referee: Walter López (Guatemala) |

| 13 October 2025 2026 World Cup qualification | Costa Rica | 4–1 | Nicaragua | San José, Costa Rica |
| 20:00 UTC−6 | Martínez 12', 28'; Ugalde 49'; Calvo 90+4' | Report | Arteaga 26' | Stadium: Estadio Nacional; Attendance: 30,927; Referee: Ismael Cornejo (El Salvador) |

| 13 November 2025 2026 World Cup qualification | Haiti | 1–0 | Costa Rica | Willemstad, Curaçao |
| 22:00 UTC−4 | Pierrot 44' | Report | | Stadium: Ergilio Hato Stadium; Attendance: 1,571; Referee: Joe Dickerson (United States) |

| 18 November 2025 2026 World Cup qualification | Costa Rica | 0–0 | Honduras | San José, Costa Rica |
| 19:00 UTC−6 | | Report | | Stadium: Estadio Nacional; Attendance: 33,456; Referee: Drew Fischer (Canada) |

Statistics

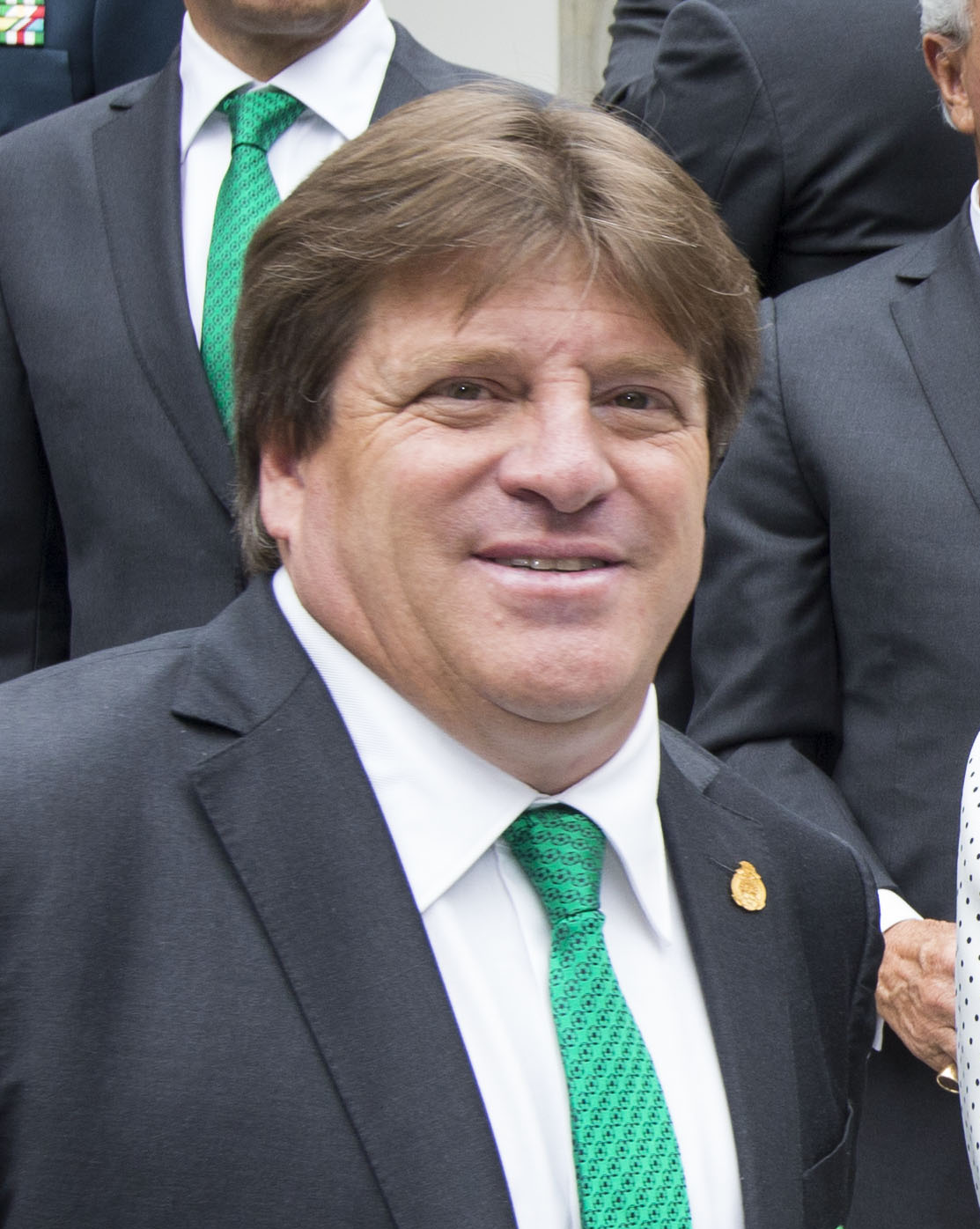
Miguel Herrera coached the team during the entirety of 2025, as Costa Rica failed to qualify to the 2026 FIFA World Cup

| Competition | Pld | W | D | L | GF | GA |
|---|---|---|---|---|---|---|
| 2026 FIFA World Cup qualification | 8 | 3 | 4 | 1 | 18 | 7 |
| CONCACAF Gold Cup qualification | 2 | 2 | 0 | 0 | 13 | 1 |
| Gold Cup | 4 | 2 | 2 | 0 | 8 | 6 |
| Friendlies | 2 | 0 | 0 | 2 | 0 | 5 |
| Total | 16 | 7 | 6 | 3 | 39 | 19 |

Coaches

| Nat | Coach | Matches |
|---|---|---|
| (Mexico) | Miguel Herrera | 16 (all) |

Goalscorers

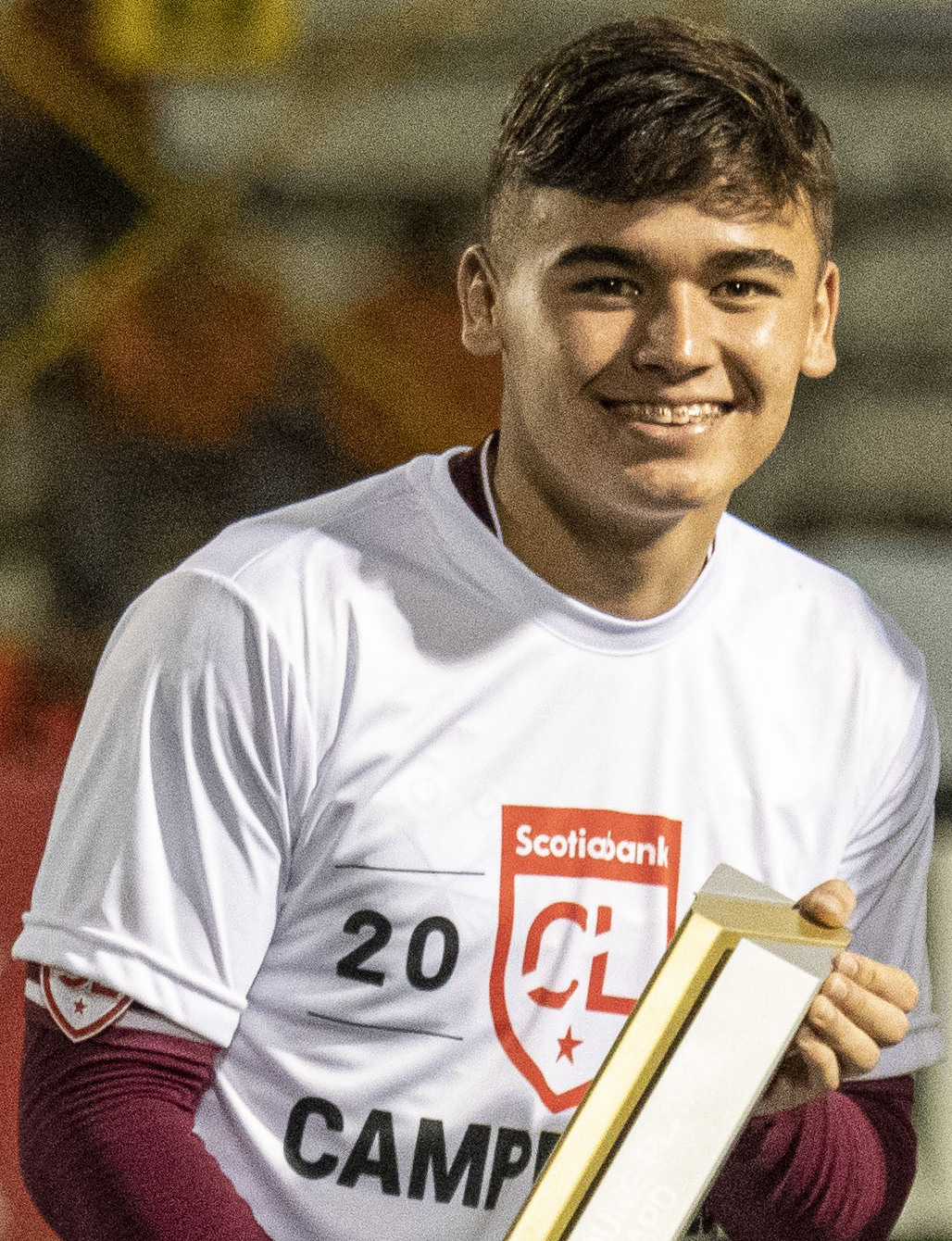
With 8 goals, Manfred Ugalde was the top goalscorer of the year

| # | Player | Goals |
|---|---|---|
| 1 | Manfred Ugalde | 8 |
| 2 | Alonso Martínez | 7 |
| 3 | Álvaro Zamora | 4 |
| 4 | Josimar Alcócer | 3 |
| 4 | Alejandro Bran | 3 |
| 4 | Warren Madrigal | 3 |
| 7 | Jeyland Mitchell | 2 |
| 7 | Kenneth Vargas | 2 |
| 7 | Francisco Calvo | 2 |
| 10 | Orlando Galo | 1 |
| 10 | Alexis Gamboa | 1 |
| 10 | Joseph Mora | 1 |
| 10 | Juan Pablo Vargas | 1 |
| – | (Belize) Donell Arzú (own goal) | 1 |

=== 2026 ===
| 27 March 2026 Friendly | Jordan | 2–2 | Costa Rica | Antalya, Türkiye (Note: The four-team mini tournament between Jordan, Iran, Nigeria, and Costa Rica was moved from Amman, Jordan to Antalya, Turkey due to the travel restrictions from the 2026 Iran war.) |
| 20:30 UTC+3 | Faisal 50' (pen.); Sabra 76' | Report | Alcócer 84'; Madrigal 90+1' | Stadium: Mardan Sports Complex; Referee: Kadir Sağlam (Turkey) |

| 31 March 2026 Friendly | Costa Rica | 0–5 | Iran | Antalya, Türkiye |
| 16:00 UTC+3 | | Report | Gholizadeh 10'; Taremi 19' (pen.), 34' (pen.); Mohebi 31'; Ghaedi 54' | Stadium: Corendon Airlines Park; Referee: Cihan Aydin (Turkey) |

| 1 June 2026 Friendly | Colombia | 3–1 | Costa Rica | Bogotá, Colombia |
| 18:00 UTC−5 | Sánchez 17'; Díaz 23'; Suárez 81' | Report | Soto 33' | Stadium: El Campín; Attendance: 11,806; Referee: Guillermo Guerrero (Ecuador) |

| 10 June 2026 Friendly | England | 3–0 | Costa Rica | Orlando, United States |
| 16:00 UTC−4 | Rice 9'; Gordon 68' (pen.); Watkins 87' | Report | | Stadium: Inter&Co Stadium; Attendance: 20,341; Referee: Katja Koroleva (United States) |

| 24 September 2026 2026–27 Nations League | Costa Rica | 3–4 | Curaçao | Tibás, Costa Rica |
| 20:00 UTC−6 | Sinclair 3'; Mora 23', 45+1' | Report | Gorré 62', 78'; Chong 66'; Paulina 83' | Stadium: Estadio Ricardo Saprissa Aymá; Attendance: 8,388; Referee: Mario Escobar (Guatemala) |

| 27 September 2026 2026–27 Nations League | Haiti | 2–0 | Costa Rica | Kingston, Jamaica |
| 18:00 UTC−5 | Bellegarde 9'; Calvo 39' (o.g.) | Report | | Stadium: Sabina Park; Attendance: 317; Referee: Iván Barton (El Salvador) |

| 1 October 2026 2026–27 Nations League | Nicaragua | 0–3 | Costa Rica | Managua, Nicaragua |
| 20:00 UTC−6 | | Report | Sinclair 57'; Mora 60'; Michel 90+7' | Stadium: Estadio Nacional de Fútbol; Attendance: 14,745; Referee: Walter López (Guatemala) |

| 4 October 2026 2026–27 Nations League | Costa Rica | 2–0 | Haiti | Tibás, Costa Rica |
| 18:00 UTC−6 | Mora 6'; Soto 21' | Report | | Stadium: Estadio Ricardo Saprissa Aymá; Referee: Armando Villarreal (United States) |

| 13 November 2026 Friendly | Ecuador | 2–0 | Costa Rica | Quito, Ecuador |
| 19:00 UTC−5 | J. Caicedo 22'; M. Caicedo 83' (pen.) | Report | | Stadium: Estadio Olímpico Atahualpa; Referee: Bruno Pérez (Peru) |

| 17 November 2026 Friendly | Argentina | 7–0 | Costa Rica | Córdoba, Argentina |
| 20:00 UTC−3 | Paz 8', 38'; Álvarez 35', 43'; Mastantuono 48', 88'; Mac Allister 78' | Report | | Stadium: Estadio Mario Alberto Kempes; Referee: Bruno Arleu de Araújo (Brazil) |

Statistics

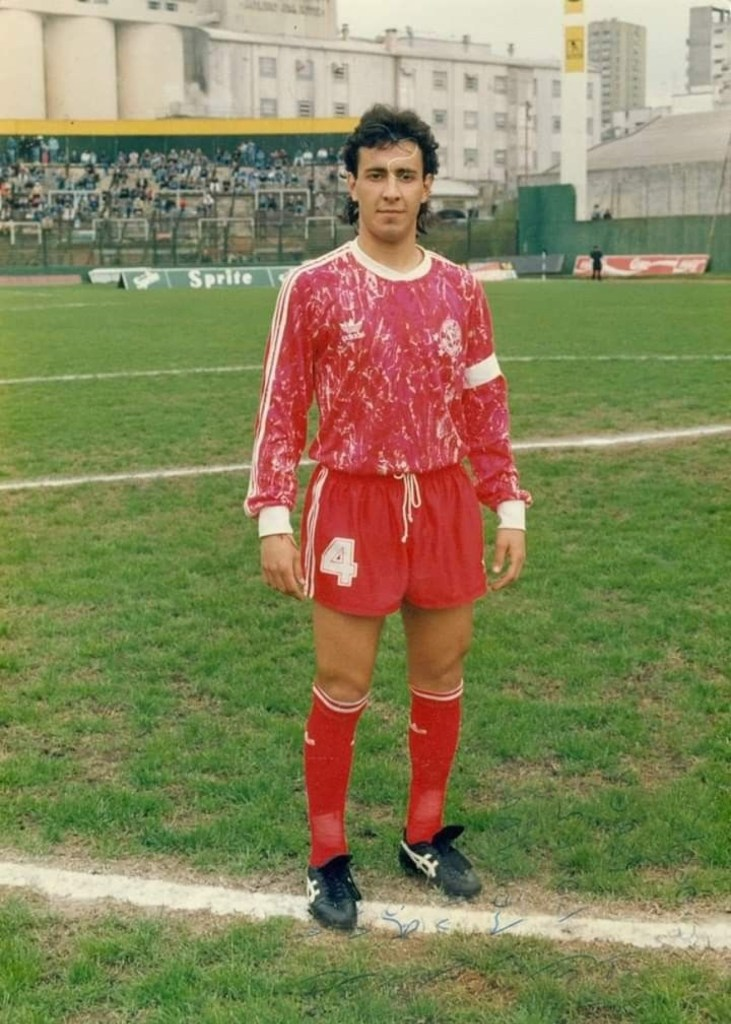
Incumbent coach Fernando Batista

| Competition | Pld | W | D | L | GF | GA |
|---|---|---|---|---|---|---|
| Friendlies | 3 | 0 | 1 | 2 | 3 | 10 |
| Total | 3 | 0 | 1 | 2 | 3 | 10 |

Coach

| Nat | Coach | Matches |
|---|---|---|
| (Argentina) | Fernando Batista | 3 (all) |

Goalscorers

| # | Player | Goals |
|---|---|---|
| 1 | Josimar Alcócer | 1 |
| 1 | Warren Madrigal | 1 |
| 1 | Andrey Soto | 1 |

== Overall statistics ==
=== Head to head records ===
Map of countries that Costa Rica faced or will face during the 2020s: Costa Rica Teams that have already faced Costa Rica Teams that are scheduled to face Costa Rica for the first time in the future Note: Non-FIFA teams are not included

Costa Rica's home confederation (i.e., CONCACAF) is listed first. Countries with scheduled matches in the future are marked in yellow.

FIFA teams

| Confed | Team | Pld | W | D | L | GF | GA |
|---|---|---|---|---|---|---|---|
| CONCACAF | Bahamas | 1 | 1 | 0 | 0 | 8 | 0 |
| CONCACAF | Belize | 2 | 2 | 0 | 0 | 13 | 1 |
| CONCACAF | Canada | 3 | 1 | 0 | 2 | 1 | 3 |
| CONCACAF | Curaçao | 1 | 0 | 0 | 1 | 3 | 4 |
| CONCACAF | Dominican Republic | 1 | 1 | 0 | 0 | 2 | 1 |
| CONCACAF | El Salvador | 5 | 3 | 2 | 0 | 6 | 2 |
| CONCACAF | Grenada | 1 | 1 | 0 | 0 | 3 | 0 |
| CONCACAF | Guatemala | 3 | 1 | 1 | 1 | 3 | 1 |
| CONCACAF | Haiti | 4 | 1 | 1 | 2 | 5 | 6 |
| CONCACAF | Honduras | 6 | 2 | 4 | 0 | 7 | 4 |
| CONCACAF | Jamaica | 3 | 2 | 1 | 0 | 3 | 1 |
| CONCACAF | Mexico | 6 | 0 | 3 | 3 | 0 | 4 |
| CONCACAF | Nicaragua | 3 | 2 | 1 | 0 | 8 | 2 |
| CONCACAF | Panama | 11 | 1 | 2 | 8 | 5 | 16 |
| CONCACAF | Saint Kitts and Nevis | 1 | 1 | 0 | 0 | 4 | 0 |
| CONCACAF | Suriname | 3 | 2 | 1 | 0 | 7 | 5 |
| CONCACAF | Trinidad and Tobago | 1 | 1 | 0 | 0 | 2 | 1 |
| CONCACAF | United States | 5 | 1 | 0 | 4 | 3 | 10 |
| AFC | Iran | 1 | 0 | 0 | 1 | 0 | 5 |
| AFC | Japan | 1 | 1 | 0 | 0 | 1 | 0 |
| AFC | Jordan | 1 | 0 | 1 | 0 | 2 | 2 |
| AFC | Saudi Arabia | 1 | 1 | 0 | 0 | 3 | 1 |
| AFC | South Korea | 1 | 0 | 1 | 0 | 2 | 2 |
| AFC | Qatar | 1 | 0 | 1 | 0 | 1 | 1 |
| AFC | United Arab Emirates | 1 | 0 | 0 | 1 | 1 | 4 |
| AFC | Uzbekistan | 1 | 1 | 0 | 0 | 2 | 1 |
| CAF | Nigeria | 1 | 1 | 0 | 0 | 2 | 0 |
| CONMEBOL | Argentina | 1 | 0 | 0 | 1 | 1 | 3 |
| CONMEBOL | Brazil | 1 | 0 | 1 | 0 | 0 | 0 |
| CONMEBOL | Colombia | 2 | 0 | 0 | 2 | 1 | 6 |
| CONMEBOL | Ecuador | 1 | 0 | 0 | 1 | 1 | 3 |
| CONMEBOL | Paraguay | 1 | 1 | 0 | 0 | 2 | 1 |
| CONMEBOL | Uruguay (Note: Match played against the A' national team) | 1 | 0 | 1 | 0 | 0 | 0 |
| OFC | New Zealand | 1 | 1 | 0 | 0 | 1 | 0 |
| UEFA | Bosnia and Herzegovina | 1 | 0 | 1 | 0 | 0 | 0 |
| UEFA | England | 2 | 0 | 0 | 2 | 0 | 5 |
| UEFA | Germany | 1 | 0 | 0 | 1 | 2 | 4 |
| UEFA | Spain | 1 | 0 | 0 | 1 | 0 | 7 |
| Total | | 81 | 29 | 21 | 31 | 105 | 106 |

Non-FIFA teams

| Confed | Team | Pld | W | D | L | GF | GA |
|---|---|---|---|---|---|---|---|
| CONCACAF | Guadeloupe | 2 | 2 | 0 | 0 | 6 | 1 |
| CONCACAF | Martinique | 3 | 3 | 0 | 0 | 10 | 5 |
| None | Basque Country | 1 | 0 | 0 | 1 | 1 | 2 |
| None | Catalonia | 1 | 0 | 0 | 1 | 0 | 2 |
| Total | | 7 | 5 | 0 | 2 | 17 | 10 |

Overall record

| NoT | Pld | W | D | L | GF | GA |
|---|---|---|---|---|---|---|
| 39 | 86 | 34 | 21 | 31 | 122 | 111 |

=== Individual records ===
Goalscorers

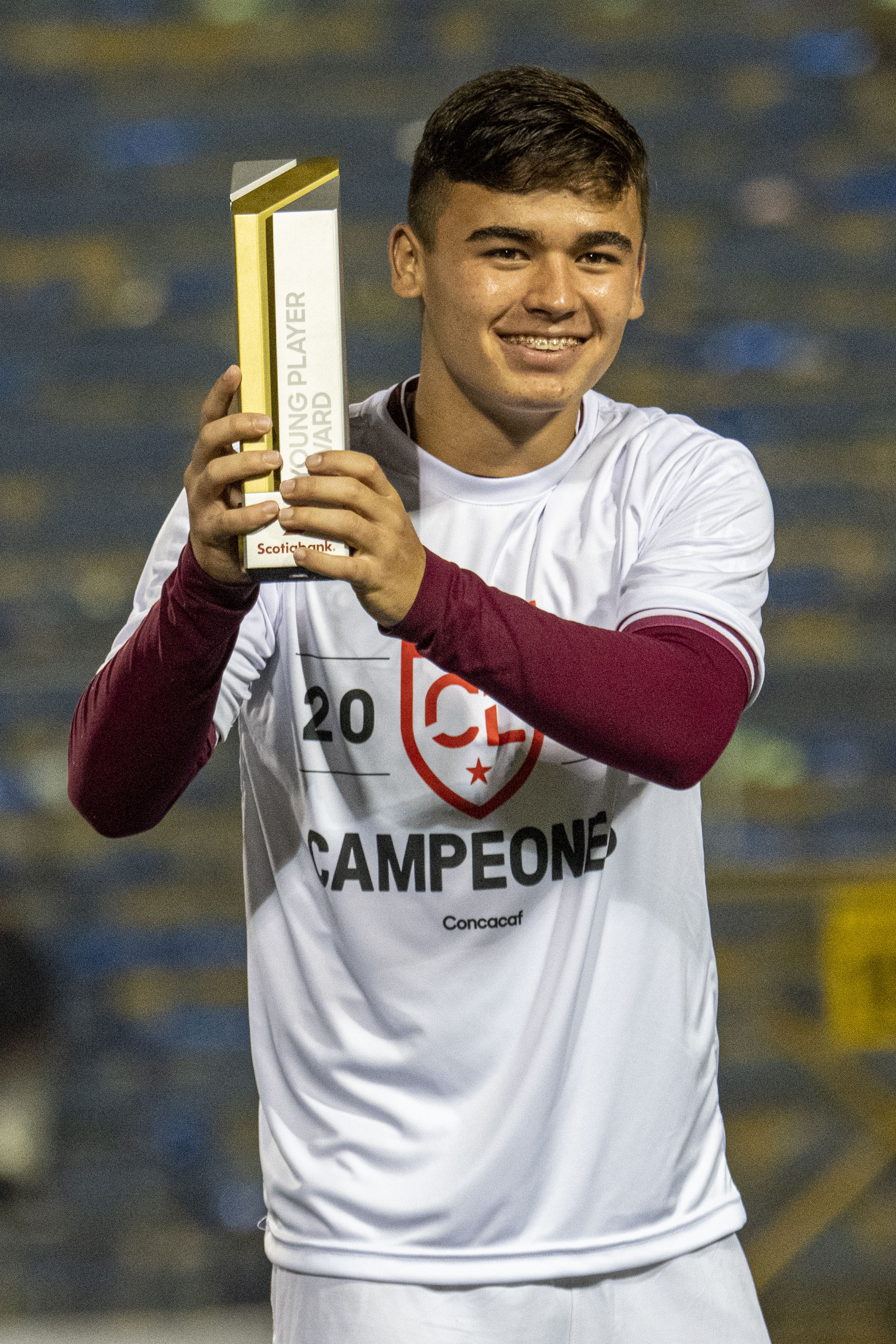
Manfred Ugalde is the top goalscorer in the decade so far, with eleven goals

| | The player was the top goalscorer (whether alone or shared) of that particular year |
| — | The player did not play, or is yet to play, at least one match in that particular year (or had not made his debut by then) |
| R | The player has retired and is not expected to play for the team anymore |

| # | Player | Years | | | | | | | Total |
| # | Player | 2020 | 2021 | 2022 | 2023 | 2024 | 2025 | 2026 | Total |
|---|---|---|---|---|---|---|---|---|---|
| 1 | Manfred Ugalde | 0 | 0 | — | 1 | 2 | 8 | 0 | 11 |
| 2 | Francisco Calvo | 0 | 1 | 1 | 3 | 3 | 2 | — | 10 |
| 2 | Joel Campbell | 1 | 3 | 4 | 2 | 0 | 0 | — | 10 |
| 4 | Alonso Martínez | — | 0 | 0 | 0 | 1 | 7 | — | 8 |
| 5 | Josimar Alcócer | — | — | — | 0 | 3 | 3 | 1 | 7 |
| 5 | Warren Madrigal | — | — | — | 0 | 3 | 3 | 1 | 7 |
| 7 | Álvaro Zamora | — | — | 0 | 0 | 1 | 4 | 0 | 5 |
| 8 | Celso Borges (Note: Borges initially retired on 15 March 2024. However, he was called up again by Miguel Herrera in October 2025, but did not play a single minute due to an injury) | 0 | 3 | 1 | 0 | R | 0 | — | 4 |
| 8 | Alejandro Bran | — | 0 | — | 0 | 1 | 3 | — | 4 |
| 8 | Anthony Contreras | — | 0 | 2 | 2 | 0 | 0 | — | 4 |
| 8 | Orlando Galo | 0 | 0 | — | 0 | 3 | 1 | 0 | 4 |
| 8 | Juan Pablo Vargas | 0 | — | 2 | 1 | 0 | 1 | 0 | 4 |
| 13 | Bryan Ruiz^{R} | — | 2 | 1 | Retired | | | | 3 |
| 13 | Aarón Suárez | — | 0 | 0 | 2 | 1 | 0 | — | 3 |
| 13 | Kenneth Vargas | — | — | — | 0 | 1 | 2 | — | 3 |
| 13 | Kendall Waston | 0 | 0 | 2 | 1 | — | 0 | — | 3 |
| 17 | Jewison Bennette | — | 0 | 2 | 0 | — | — | 0 | 2 |
| 17 | Óscar Duarte | 0 | 1 | 1 | 0 | — | — | — | 2 |
| 17 | Keysher Fuller | 0 | 1 | 1 | 0 | — | — | — | 2 |
| 17 | Ariel Lassiter | — | 1 | — | — | 1 | 0 | — | 2 |
| 17 | Jeyland Mitchell | — | — | — | — | 0 | 2 | 0 | 2 |
| 22 | Jefferson Brenes | 0 | 0 | — | — | 1 | 0 | 0 | 1 |
| 22 | Diego Campos | — | — | — | 1 | — | 0 | — | 1 |
| 22 | Julio Cascante | — | — | — | 1 | 0 | 0 | — | 1 |
| 22 | Jostin Daly | 0 | — | — | — | 1 | — | — | 1 |
| 22 | Alexis Gamboa | — | — | — | 0 | 0 | 1 | — | 1 |
| 22 | Randall Leal | 0 | 0 | — | 1 | 0 | — | — | 1 |
| 22 | Jimmy Marín | — | 1 | — | 0 | — | — | — | 1 |
| 22 | Joseph Mora | 0 | 0 | — | — | 0 | 1 | — | 1 |
| 22 | Jonathan Moya | 1 | 0 | — | — | — | — | — | 1 |
| 22 | Andy Rojas | — | — | — | — | 1 | 0 | 0 | 1 |
| 22 | Andrey Soto | — | — | — | — | — | — | 1 | 1 |
| 22 | Gerald Taylor | — | — | — | 0 | 1 | 0 | 0 | 1 |
| 22 | Yeltsin Tejeda | 0 | 0 | 1 | 0 | — | — | — | 1 |
| 22 | Gerson Torres | — | 1 | 0 | — | — | — | — | 1 |
| – | Own goals | 0 | 0 | 0 | 0 | 0 | 1 | 0 | 1 |
| T | 34 players + 1 own goal | 2 | 14 | 19 | 15 | 24 | 39 | 3 | 114 |
