= Andy Rojas (footballer) =

Costa Rican footballer (born 2005)

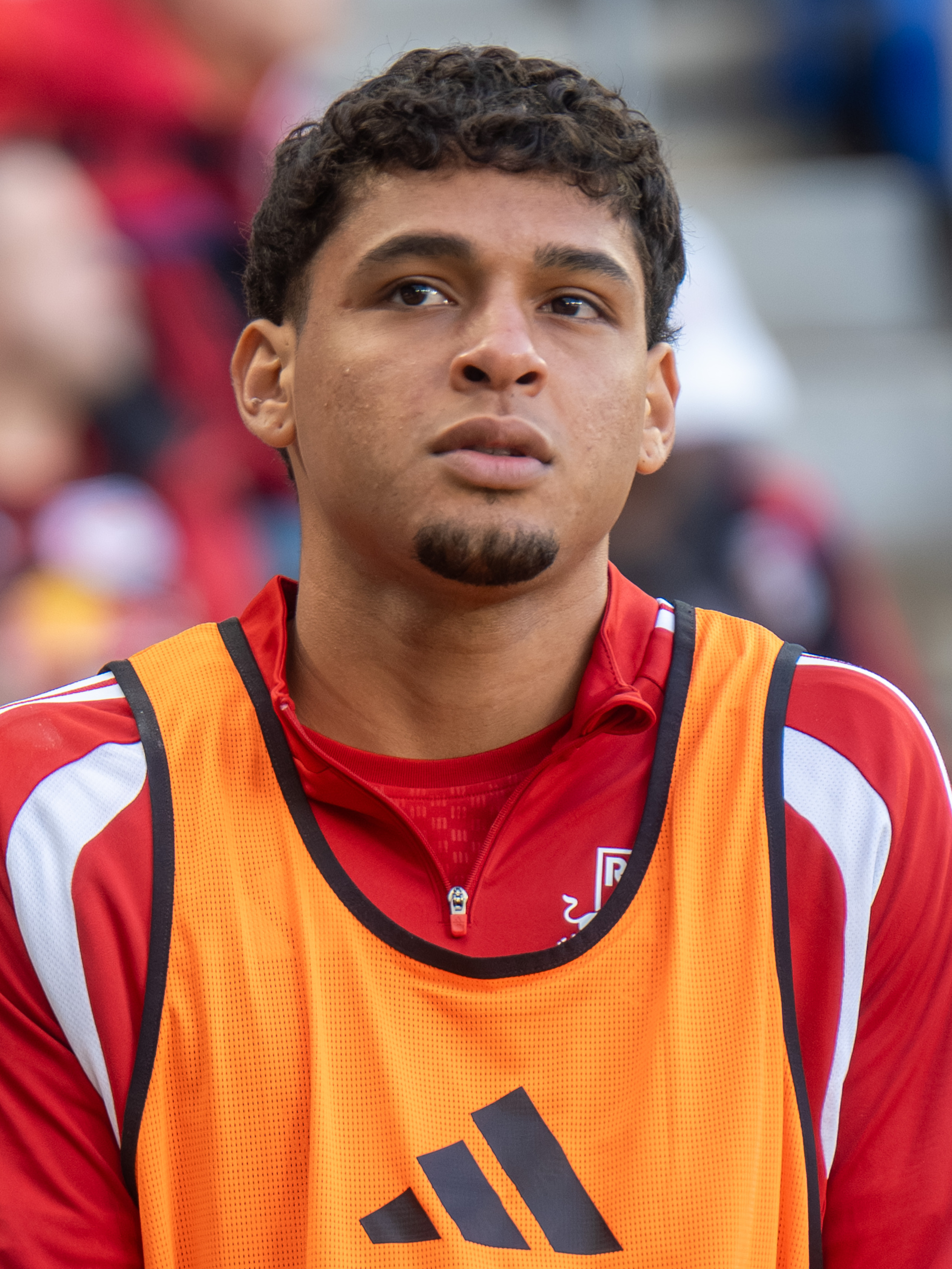
- Rojas with the New York Red Bulls in 2026

Personal information
- Full name: Andy Emanuel Rojas Maroto
- Date of birth: 5 December 2005 (age 20)
- Place of birth: Grecia, Alajuela, Costa Rica
- Height: 1.81 m (5 ft 11 in)
- Positions: Left midfielder; forward

Team information
- Current team: New York Red Bulls
- Number: 70

Youth career
- –2023: Herediano

Senior career*
Years	Team	Apps	(Gls)
2022–2025	Herediano	74	(12)
2025	→ New York Red Bulls II (loan)	15	(2)
2025–	New York Red Bulls	4	(0)
2025–	→ New York Red Bulls II (loan)	33	(8)

International career^{‡}
2024–	Costa Rica U20	4	(2)
2023–	Costa Rica U23	2	(0)
2024–	Costa Rica	17	(1)
- * Club domestic league appearances and goals as of 23:03, 14 March 2026 (UTC) ‡ National team caps and goals as of 21:01, 31 March 2026 (UTC)

Andy Emanuel Rojas Maroto (born 5 December 2005), also known as Tuti, is a Costa Rican professional footballer who plays as a left midfielder or forward for Major League Soccer club New York Red Bulls and the Costa Rica national team.

== Club career ==
=== C. S. Herediano ===
Born in Grecia, Alajuela, Rojas began his career in the youth ranks of Herediano. On 3 September 2022, Rojas made his professional debut in the Liga FPD with Herediano against Guadalupe in a 5–0 victory. On 27 August 2023, he scored his first career goal against Alajuelense in a 2–3 league defeat.

On 30 October 2023, Rojas made his international debut for Herediano in a 2023 CONCACAF Central American Cup match against Comunicaciones, Rojas scored in the 55nd minute in a 2–1 victory, helping his side to a first-place finish in the group stages.

On 7 July 2024, Rojas helped Herediano to the 2024 Supercopa de Costa Rica title. Rojas entered the match in the 56th minute and scored the equalizer in the 76th minute against Deportivo Saprissa. The match would end in a 1–1 draw, with Herediano winning the title 5–4 on penalties. On 27 December, Rojas was crowned champion of the Apertura 2024 with Herediano, defeating Alajuelense on an aggregate score of 3–2, having appeared as a starter in both matches.

==== Loan to New York Red Bulls II ====
On 7 February 2025, Rojas was loaned to New York Red Bulls II with the club having an option to make the move permanent in 2026. On 7 March 2025, Rojas made his debut for New York Red Bulls II in a 1–0 victory over Atlanta United 2, scoring the only goal of the match.

=== New York Red Bulls ===
On 19 August 2025, it was announced that New York Red Bulls completed the transfer of Rojas from C.S. Herediano and signed him to a three-and-a-half-year MLS contract. Rojas had previously made his debut for New York Red Bulls on 7 August 2025, appearing as a starter in a 1–1 draw with Liga MX side FC Juárez in a Leagues Cup match.

== International career ==
On 6 June 2024, Rojas made his international debut with Costa Rica national team against Saint Kitts and Nevis as part of the 2026 FIFA World Cup qualification. He entered the field in the 81st minute as a substitute and scored a goal three minutes later, contributing in a 4–0 victory for his team. At 18 years, 6 months and 1 day, he became the youngest Costa Rican player to score in the World Cup qualifiers after his goal against Saint Kitts and Nevis.

On 11 June 2024, Rojas was named in Costa Rica's 26-men squad for the 2024 Copa América.

== Personal life ==
Rojas is the nephew of the former Costa Rican international Óscar Rojas.

== Career statistics ==
=== Club ===
As of match played 30 September 2026

Appearances and goals by club, season and competition
Club	Season	League			National cup (Note: Includes Costa Rican Cup)		League cup		Continental		Other		Total	
Club	Season	Division	Apps	Goals	Apps	Goals	Apps	Goals	Apps	Goals	Apps	Goals	Apps	Goals
Herediano	2022–23	Liga FPD	3	0	2	0	—		0	0	0	0	5	0
Herediano	2023–24	Liga FPD	40	8	1	0	—		5 (Note: Appearances in CONCACAF Champions Cup)	1	4 (Note: Appearances in CONCACAF Central American Cup)	1	50	10
Herediano	2024–25	Liga FPD	31	4	1	1	—		0	0	6	0	38	5
Herediano	Total		74	12	4	1	0	0	5	1	10	1	93	15
New York Red Bulls II (loan)	2025	MLS Next Pro	15	2	—		—		—		—		15	2
New York Red Bulls (loan)	2025	Major League Soccer	0	0	0	0	—		—		1 (Note: Appearance in Leagues Cup)	0	1	0
New York Red Bulls II	2025	MLS Next Pro	21	3	—		—		—		4 (Note: Appearances in MLS Next Pro playoffs)	2	25	5
New York Red Bulls II	2026	MLS Next Pro	12	5	—		—		—		0	0	12	5
New York Red Bulls II	Total		33	8	—		—		—		4	2	37	10
New York Red Bulls	2026	Major League Soccer	4	0	—		—		—		—		4	0
Career total			126	22	4	1	0	0	5	1	15	3	150	27

=== International ===
As of match played 31 March 2026

Appearances and goals by national team and year
National team	Year	Apps	Goals
Costa Rica	2024	4	1
Costa Rica	2025	11	0
Costa Rica	2026	2	0
Total		17	1

Scores and results list Costa Rica's goal tally first, score column indicates score after each Rojas goal.

List of international goals scored by Andy Rojas
No.	Date	Venue	Opponent	Score	Result	Competition
1	6 June 2024	Estadio Nacional de Costa Rica, San José, Costa Rica	Saint Kitts and Nevis	4–0	4–0	2026 FIFA World Cup qualification
