= Orlando Galo =

Costa Rican footballer (born 2000)

Personal information
- Full name: Orlando Moisés Galo Calderón
- Date of birth: 11 August 2000 (age 26)
- Place of birth: Puntarenas, Costa Rica
- Height: 1.76 m (5 ft 9 in)
- Position: Defender

Team information
- Current team: Riga
- Number: 4

Youth career
- –2018: Alajuelense

Senior career*
Years	Team	Apps	(Gls)
2018–2019	Alajuelense	17	(0)
2019–2025	Herediano	157	(7)
2024–2025	→ Riga (loan)	17	(4)
2025–	Riga	37	(8)

International career^{‡}
2018	Costa Rica U20	5	(0)
2021–	Costa Rica	37	(4)
- * Club domestic league appearances and goals as of 19 September 2026 ‡ National team caps and goals as of 27 September 2026

Orlando Moisés Galo Calderón, known as Orlando Galo (born 11 August 2000) is a Costa Rican football player. He plays for Latvian club Riga and the Costa Rica national team.

In 2022, he was discover by FIFA using illegal substances in sports and banned for 12 months from playing professionally.

== International career ==
He made his debut for the Costa Rica national football team on 7 October 2021 in a World Cup qualifier against Honduras.

== Career statistics ==
=== Club ===
As of match played 19 September 2026

Appearances and goals by club, season and competition
Club	Season	League			National cup		Continental		Other		Total	
Club	Season	Division	Apps	Goals	Apps	Goals	Apps	Goals	Apps	Goals	Apps	Goal
Alajuelense	2017–18	Liga FPD	4	0	—		—		—		4	0
Alajuelense	2018–19	Liga FPD	13	0	—		—		—		13	0
Alajuelense	Total		17	0	—		—		—		17	0
Herediano	2018–19	Liga FPD	12	0	—		—		—		12	0
Herediano	2019–20	Liga FPD	28	1	—		2 (Note: Appearance(s) in CONCACAF League)	0	—		30	1
Herediano	2020–21	Liga FPD	37	2	—		1	0	1 (Note: Appearance in Supercopa de Costa Rica)	0	39	2
Herediano	2021–22	Liga FPD	38	3	—		—		—		38	3
Herediano	2022–23	Liga FPD	14	0	—		4	0	1	0	19	0
Herediano	2023–24	Liga FPD	28	1	—		7 (Note: Two appearances in CONCACAF Central American Cup, five appearances in CONCACAF Champions Cup)	0	—		34	1
Herediano	Total		157	7	—		14	0	2	0	173	7
Riga (loan)	2025	Latvian Higher League	17	4	—		—		—		18	4
Riga	2025	Latvian Higher League	29	2	4	1	6 (Note: Appearances in UEFA Conference League)	0	—		39	3
Riga	2026	Latvian Higher League	23	6	0	0	5 (Note: Two appearances in UEFA Champions League, three appearances and one goal in UEFA Conference League)	1	—		28	7
Riga	Total		52	8	4	1	11	1	—		67	10
Career total			243	19	4	1	26	1	2	0	275	21

=== International ===
As of match played 27 September 2026

Appearances and goals by national team and year
National team	Year	Apps	Goals
Costa Rica	2021	4	0
Costa Rica	2022	6	0
Costa Rica	2023	0	0
Costa Rica	2024	9	3
Costa Rica	2025	12	1
Costa Rica	2026	6	0
Total		37	4

Scores and results list Costa Rica's goal tally first, score column indicates score after each Galo goal.

List of international goals scored by Orlando Galo
No.	Date	Venue	Opponent	Score	Result	Competition
1	23 March 2024	Toyota Stadium, Frisco, United States	Honduras	1–1	3–1	2024 Copa América qualifying play-offs
2	6 June 2024	Estadio Nacional, San José, Costa Rica	Saint Kitts and Nevis	1–0	4–0	2026 FIFA World Cup qualification
3	6 June 2024	Estadio Nacional, San José, Costa Rica	Saint Kitts and Nevis	2–0	4–0	2026 FIFA World Cup qualification
4	7 June 2025	Wildey Turf, Bridgetown, Barbados	Bahamas	4–0	8–0	2026 FIFA World Cup qualification
