= Andrey Soto =

Costa Rican footballer (born 2003)

Personal information
- Full name: Andrey Josué Soto Ruiz
- Date of birth: 8 April 2003 (age 23)
- Place of birth: Quesada, Costa Rica
- Position: Midfielder

Team information
- Current team: Sarprissa
- Number: 26

Senior career*
Years	Team	Apps	(Gls)
2020–2026	San Carlos	96	(5)
2024	Herediano (loan)	8	(0)
2026	Pérez Zeledón	18	(2)
2026–	Sarprissa	5	(2)

International career^{‡}
2018	Costa Rica U15	1	(0)
2018–2019	Costa Rica U17	5	(0)
2022–2023	Costa Rica U20	14	(3)
2023	Costa Rica U22	5	(1)
2026–	Costa Rica	6	(2)
- * Club domestic league appearances and goals as of 13 September 2026 ‡ National team caps and goals as of 22:10, 4 October 2026 (UTC)

Andrey Josué Soto Ruiz (born 8 April 2003) is a Costa Rican footballer who currently plays as a midfielder for Deportivo Saprissa and the Costa Rica national team.

== Career statistics ==
=== Club ===
As of 13 September 2026.

Club	Season	League			Cup		Continental		Other		Total	
Club	Season	Division	Apps	Goals	Apps	Goals	Apps	Goals	Apps	Goals	Apps	Goals
San Carlos	2018–19	Liga FPD	1	0	0	0	—		—		1	0
San Carlos	2019–20	Liga FPD	5	0	0	0	—		—		5	0
San Carlos	2020–21	Liga FPD	11	0	0	0	—		—		11	0
San Carlos	2021–22	Liga FPD	18	3	0	0	—		—		18	3
San Carlos	2022–23	Liga FPD	5	0	0	0	—		—		5	0
San Carlos	2023–24	Liga FPD	43	2	3	0	—		—		46	2
San Carlos	2025–26	Liga FPD	9	0	2	0	—		—		11	0
San Carlos	Total		96	5	5	0	—		—		98	5
Herediano (loan)	2024–25	Liga FPD	8	0	—		2 (Note: Appearances in CONCACAF Central American Cup)	0	1 (Note: Appearance in Supercopa de Costa Rica)	0	11	0
Pérez Zeledón	2025–26	Liga FPD	18	2	—		—		—		18	2
Sarprissa	2026–27	Liga FPD	5	2	0	0	4	0	1	0	10	2
Career total			124	9	5	0	6	0	2	0	137	9

=== International ===
As of match played 4 October 2026

Appearances and goals by national team and year
National team	Year	Apps	Goals
Costa Rica	2026	6	2
Total		6	2

Scores and results list Costa Rica's goal tally first, score column indicates score after each Soto goal.

List of international goals scored by Andrey Soto
No.	Date	Venue	Opponent	Score	Result	Competition
1	1 June 2026	Estadio El Campín, Bogotá, Colombia	Colombia	1–2	1–3	Friendly
2	4 October 2026	Estadio Ricardo Saprissa Aymá, Tibás, Costa Rica	Haiti	2–0	2–0	2026–27 CONCACAF Nations League A
