= Warren Madrigal =

Costa Rican footballer (born 2004)

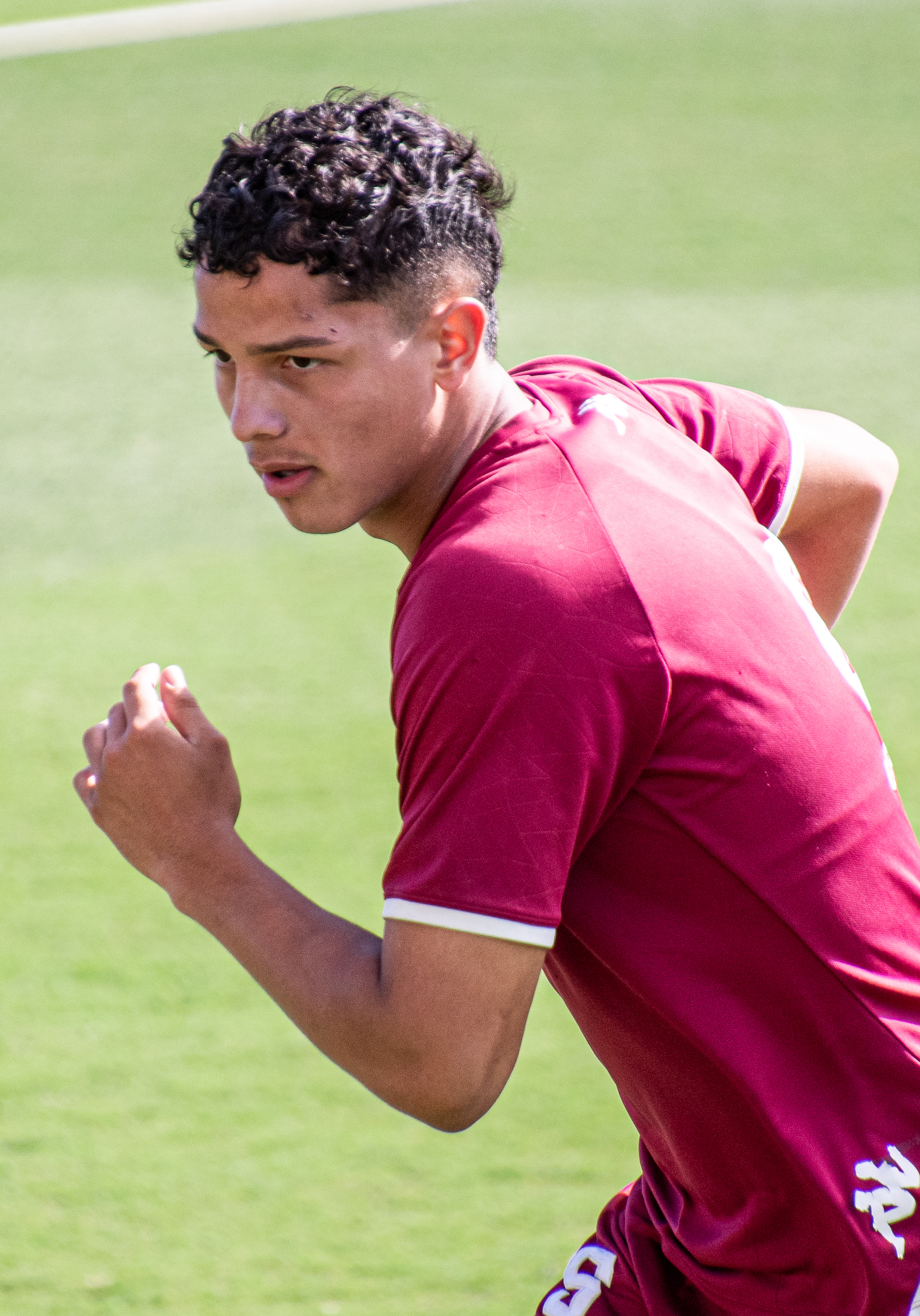
- Madrigal with Saprissa in 2024

Personal information
- Full name: Warren Steven Madrigal Molina
- Date of birth: 24 July 2004 (age 22)
- Place of birth: San José, Costa Rica
- Height: 1.78 m (5 ft 10 in)
- Position: Forward

Team information
- Current team: Nashville SC
- Number: 41

Senior career*
Years	Team	Apps	(Gls)
2020–2025	Saprissa	87	(17)
2022–2023	→ Sporting San Jose (loan)	5	(0)
2024–2025	→ Valencia B (loan)	6	(8)
2024–2025	→ Valencia (loan)	0	(0)
2026–	Nashville SC	5	(2)

International career^{‡}
2022–2023	Costa Rica U20	1	(0)
2023–	Costa Rica	28	(7)
- * Club domestic league appearances and goals as of 23:15, 20 March 2026 (UTC) ‡ National team caps and goals as of 23:05, 31 March 2026 (UTC)

Warren Steven Madrigal Molina (born 24 July 2004) is a Costa Rican professional footballer who plays as a forward for Major League Soccer club Nashville SC and the Costa Rica national team.

== Career statistics ==
=== Club ===
As of 20 March 2026

Club	Season	League			National cup (Note: Includes Costa Rican Cup and Copa del Rey)		Continental		Other		Total	
Club	Season	Division	Apps	Goals	Apps	Goals	Apps	Goals	Apps	Goals	Apps	Goals
Saprissa	2020–21	Liga FPD	7	0	0	0	1 (Note: Appearances in the CONCACAF League)	0	0	0	8	0
Saprissa	2021–22	Liga FPD	2	0	0	0	0	0	—		2	0
Saprissa	2022–23	Liga FPD	23	9	0	0	0	0	—		23	9
Saprissa	2023–24	Liga FPD	40	7	2	0	0	0	4 (Note: Three appearances and one goal in CONCACAF Central American Cup; one appearance in Supercopa de Costa Rica)	1	46	8
Saprissa	2024–25	Liga FPD	3	0	0	0	2 (Note: Appearances in CONCACAF Champions Cup)	1	1 (Note: Appearance in Supercopa de Costa Rica)	0	6	0
Saprissa	2025–26	Liga FPD	12	1	0	0	—		—		12	1
Saprissa	Total		87	17	2	0	3	1	5	1	97	17
Sporting San José (loan)	2022–23	Liga FPD	5	0	3	1	—		—		9	1
Valencia B (loan)	2024–25	Segunda Federación	6	8	—		—		—		6	8
Valencia (loan)	2024–25	La Liga	0	0	1	0	—		—		1	0
Nashville SC	2026	Major League Soccer	5	2	—		3	0	0	0	8	2
Career total			103	27	6	1	6	1	5	1	121	29

=== International ===
As of match played 31 March 2026

Appearances and goals by national team and year
National team	Year	Apps	Goals
Costa Rica	2023	6	0
Costa Rica	2024	15	3
Costa Rica	2025	5	3
Costa Rica	2026	2	1
Total		28	7

Scores and results list Costa Rica's goal tally first, score column indicates score after each Madrigal goal.

List of international goals scored by Warren Madrigal
No.	Date	Venue	Opponent	Score	Result	Competition
1	23 March 2024	Toyota Stadium, Frisco, United States	Honduras	2–1	3–1	2024 Copa América qualification
2	5 September 2024	Estadio Nacional, San José, Costa Rica	Guadeloupe	3–0	3–0	2024–25 CONCACAF Nations League A
3	15 October 2024	Estadio Nacional, San José, Costa Rica	Guatemala	1–0	3–0	2024–25 CONCACAF Nations League A
4	7 June 2025	BFA Technical Centre, Wildey, Barbados	Bahamas	6–0	8–0	2026 FIFA World Cup qualification
5	7 June 2025	BFA Technical Centre, Wildey, Barbados	Bahamas	7–0	8–0	2026 FIFA World Cup qualification
6	10 June 2025	Estadio Nacional, San José, Costa Rica	Trinidad and Tobago	2–0	2–1	2026 FIFA World Cup qualification
7	27 March 2026	Mardan Sports Complex, Antalya, Turkey	Jordan	2–2	2–2	2026 Jordan International Tournament

== Honours ==
Deportivo Saprissa

- Liga FPD: Clausura 2021
