= 2024 Copa América qualifying play-offs =

Tournament details
- Host country: United States
- Dates: March 23, 2024
- Teams: 4 (from 1 confederation)
- Venue: 1 (in 1 host city)

Tournament statistics
- Matches played: 2
- Goals scored: 6 (3 per match)
- Top scorer(s): Six players (1 goal each)

The 2024 Copa América qualifying play-offs or play-in round were contested by four CONCACAF teams to earn the final two places in the 2024 Copa América. It was the second time that a qualifying tournament was organized for CONCACAF teams to enter into the Copa América. Both play-off matches were held at Toyota Stadium in Frisco, Texas, United States.

== Background ==
Following the signing of a strategic collaboration agreement between CONCACAF and CONMEBOL in January 2023, six CONCACAF teams were permitted to join the ten member nations of CONMEBOL in the 2024 Copa America. The four winners of the two-legged 2023–24 CONCACAF Nations League quarter-finals qualified for the Copa América, while the losing quarter-finalists were then paired to play in two single-legged qualifying play-off matches for final qualification into the tournament.

=== Qualification via CONCACAF Nations League ===
==== League phase ====
Group A
Pos	Team	Pld	Pts
1	Panama	4	10
2	Trinidad and Tobago	4	9
3	Martinique	4	7
4	Guatemala	4	4
5	Curaçao (R)	4	3
6	El Salvador (R)	4	1

Source: CONCACAF
(R) Relegated

Group B
Pos	Team	Pld	Pts
1	Jamaica	4	10
2	Honduras	4	7
3	Suriname	4	5
4	Cuba	4	5
5	Haiti (R)	4	3
6	Grenada (R)	4	1

Source: CONCACAF
(R) Relegated

Byes
Pos	Team	Rank (Note: CONCACAF rankings (as of October 18, 2023))	Pts
1	Mexico	1	1,967
2	United States	2	1,909
3	Canada	4	1,729
4	Costa Rica	5	1,676

==== Quarter-finals ====
The first legs were played from 16 to 18 November, and the second legs were played on 20 and 21 November 2023.

Team 1	Agg.	Team 2	1st leg	2nd leg
Costa Rica	1–6	Panama	0–3	1–3
Jamaica	4–4 (a)	Canada	1–2	3–2
United States	4–2	Trinidad and Tobago	3–0	1–2
Honduras	2–2 (2–4 p)	Mexico	2–0	0–2 (a.e.t.)

== Venue ==
Location of the host city of the 2024 Copa América qualifying play-offs.

- 1 Frisco

City	Stadium
Frisco (Dallas–Fort Worth Area)	Toyota Stadium
Capacity: 20,500

== Seeding ==
The play-off pairings were determined based on the CONCACAF Rankings published after November 2023 FIFA Match Window.

Pos	Team	Rank (Note: CONCACAF rankings (as of November 22, 2023))	Pts
1	Canada	4	1,710
2	Costa Rica	5	1,617
3	Honduras	7	1,454
4	Trinidad and Tobago	10	1,375

The match-ups were as follows:

- First-ranked team vs. fourth-ranked team
- Second-ranked team vs. third-ranked team

== Matches ==
The fixture list was confirmed by CONCACAF on November 22, 2023. All match times are in EDT (UTC−4) as listed by CONCACAF (local times are in parentheses).

=== Canada vs Trinidad and Tobago ===
March 23, 2024
16:00 (15:00 UTC−5)

Canada	2–0	Trinidad and Tobago
Larin 61'; Shaffelburg 90+1'	Report

Toyota Stadium, Frisco
Referee: Marco Ortíz (Mexico)

Canada qualified for Group A of the 2024 Copa América.

Canada	Trinidad and Tobago

GK	16	Maxime Crépeau
RB	2	Alistair Johnston	(yellow card) 45+1'
CB	5	Joel Waterman
CB	4	Kamal Miller
LB	19	Alphonso Davies
RM	17	Tajon Buchanan	(yellow card) 42'	(substituted off) 80'
CM	8	Ismaël Koné		(substituted off) 90+3'
CM	7	Stephen Eustáquio (c)		(substituted off) 90+4'
LM	12	Iké Ugbo		(substituted off) 70'
CF	10	Jonathan David
CF	9	Cyle Larin		(substituted off) 80'
Substitutes:
GK	1	Dayne St. Clair
GK	18	Jonathan Sirois
DF	3	Luc de Fougerolles		(substituted on) 90+3'
DF	13	Derek Cornelius
DF	20	Moïse Bombito
MF	6	Samuel Piette		(substituted on) 90+4'
MF	15	Mathieu Choinière		(substituted on) 80'
MF	21	Liam Fraser
FW	11	Theo Bair
FW	14	Jacob Shaffelburg		(substituted on) 70'
FW	22	Jacen Russell-Rowe		(substituted on) 80'
FW	23	Liam Millar
Interim coach:
Mauro Biello

GK	22	Denzil Smith
CB	2	Aubrey David (c)	(yellow card) 5'
CB	15	Neveal Hackshaw		(substituted off) 71'
CB	17	Justin Garcia
RWB	16	Alvin Jones
LWB	6	André Raymond
DM	8	Daniel Phillips	(yellow card) 45+1'
CM	18	Andre Rampersad		(substituted off) 56'
CM	19	Ajani Fortune		(substituted off) 81'
SS	14	Shannon Gomez		(substituted off) 81'
CF	11	Levi García
Substitutes:
GK	1	Christopher Biggette
GK	21	Adrian Foncette
DF	3	Ross Russell
DF	4	Jesse Williams
DF	5	Robert Primus
DF	7	Noah Powder		(substituted on) 71'
MF	9	Nathaniel James
MF	10	Real Gill		(substituted on) 81'
MF	12	Kevon Goddard
FW	13	Reon Moore		(substituted on) 56'
FW	20	Kaile Auvray		(substituted on) 81'
FW	23	Judah García
Manager:
Angus Eve

Man of the Match:
Cyle Larin (Canada)

Assistant referees:
Christian Espinosa (Mexico)
Jorge Sánchez (Mexico)
Fourth official:
Víctor Cáceres (Mexico)
Video assistant referee:
Erick Miranda (Mexico)
Assistant video assistant referee:
Guillermo Pacheco (Mexico)

=== Costa Rica vs Honduras ===
March 23, 2024
19:15 (18:15 UTC−5)

Costa Rica	3–1	Honduras
Galo 12'; Madrigal 56'; Brenes 62'	Report	Chirinos 10'

Toyota Stadium, Frisco
Attendance: 15,299
Referee: Ismail Elfath (United States)

Costa Rica qualified for Group D of the 2024 Copa América.

Costa Rica	Honduras

GK	1	Keylor Navas (c)
CB	6	Julio Cascante
CB	3	Pablo Arboine
CB	15	Francisco Calvo
RWB	2	Gerald Taylor		(substituted off) 69'
LWB	8	Joseph Mora		(substituted off) 90+2'
RM	17	Warren Madrigal		(substituted off) 87'
CM	14	Orlando Galo
CM	13	Jefferson Brenes
LM	21	Álvaro Zamora	(yellow card) 45+2'	(substituted off) 69'
CF	9	Manfred Ugalde		(substituted off) 87'
Substitutes:
GK	1	Kevin Chamorro
GK	23	Patrick Sequeira
DF	4	Juan Pablo Vargas		(substituted on) 90+2'
DF	5	Fernán Faerrón
DF	22	Haxzel Quirós		(substituted on) 69'
MF	10	Elías Aguilar
MF	11	Ariel Lassiter
MF	12	Joel Campbell		(substituted on) 69'
MF	16	Alejandro Bran
MF	20	Brandon Aguilera
FW	7	Anthony Contreras		(substituted on) 87'
FW	19	Kenneth Vargas		(substituted on) 87'
Manager:
(Argentina) Gustavo Alfaro

GK	18	Jonathan Rougier
RB	14	Andy Najar (c)
CB	3	Raúl Santos
CB	4	Luis Vega
LB	2	Wesly Decas
RM	7	Rigoberto Rivas		(substituted off) 83'
CM	20	Deybi Flores	(yellow card) 30'
CM	23	Jorge Álvarez		(substituted off) 65'
LM	8	Michaell Chirinos		(substituted off) 84'
SS	16	Edwin Rodríguez
CF	11	Jerry Bengtson		(substituted off) 65'
Substitutes:
GK	1	Harold Fonseca
GK	23	Alex Güity
DF	5	Carlos Meléndez
DF	6	Javier Arriaga
DF	15	Julián Martínez
MF	10	Alexander López
MF	12	David Ruiz		(substituted on) 65'
MF	14	Carlos Argueta
MF	19	Carlos Pineda
FW	9	Douglas Martínez		(substituted on) 84'
FW	13	Darixon Vuelto		(substituted on) 83'
FW	21	Bryan Róchez		(substituted on) 65'
Manager:
(Colombia) Reinaldo Rueda

Man of the Match:
Orlando Galo (Costa Rica)

Assistant referees:
Corey Parker (United States)
Kyle Atkins (United States)
Fourth official:
Armando Villarreal (United States)
Video assistant referee:
Allen Chapman (United States)
Assistant video assistant referee:
Chris Penso (United States)

== Qualified teams for 2024 Copa América ==
The following six CONCACAF teams qualified as guests for the 2024 Copa América held in the United States.

Team	Qualified on	Previous appearances in Copa América^{1}
United States	20 November 2023	4 (1993, 1995, 2007, 2016)
Panama	20 November 2023	1 (2016)
Jamaica	21 November 2023	2 (2015, 2016)
Mexico	21 November 2023	10 (1993, 1995, 1997, 1999, 2001, 2005, 2007, 2011, 2015, 2016)
Canada	23 March 2024	0 (Debut) (Note: Canada had been invited to the 2001 Copa América as the 2000 CONCACAF Gold Cup champions, but withdrew from the tournament following its initial cancellation, and chose not to attend when it was rescheduled.)
Costa Rica	23 March 2024	5 (1997, 2001, 2004, 2011, 2016)

^{1} Italic indicates hosts for that year.
