= Jefferson Brenes =

Costa Rican footballer (born 1997)

Personal information
- Full name: Jefferson Brenes Rojas
- Date of birth: 13 April 1997 (age 29)
- Place of birth: Limón, Costa Rica
- Height: 1.73 m (5 ft 8 in)
- Position: Midfielder

Team information
- Current team: Bhayangkara Presisi
- Number: 97

Senior career*
Years	Team	Apps	(Gls)
2017–2019	Limón	45	(1)
2019–2023	Herediano	104	(12)
2019	→ Limón (loan)	13	(0)
2019–2020	→ Municipal Grecia (loan)	13	(2)
2023–2026	Deportivo Saprissa	95	(17)
2026–	Bhayangkara Presisi	3	(1)

International career^{‡}
2020–2021	Costa Rica U23	3	(0)
2019–	Costa Rica	23	(1)
- * Club domestic league appearances and goals as of 19 September 2026 ‡ National team caps and goals as of 31 March 2026

Jefferson Brenes Rojas (born 13 April 1997) is a Costa Rican professional footballer who plays as a midfielder for Super League club Bhayangkara Presisi and the Costa Rica national team.

== Career ==
Brenes began his professional career with Limón in the Liga FPD in 2017, before signing with Herediano on 15 July 2019. On 14 December 2019 he was loaned to Municipal Grecia. He returned to Herediano on 23 June 2020.

== International career ==
Brenes debuted with the Costa Rica national team in a 1–0 friendly loss to Panama on 10 October 2020. He was called up to represent Costa Rica at the 2021 CONCACAF Gold Cup.

== Career statistics ==
=== International ===
As of match played 31 March 2026

Appearances and goals by national team and year
National team	Year	Apps	Goals
Costa Rica	2020	1	0
Costa Rica	2021	6	0
Costa Rica	2024	13	1
Costa Rica	2025	1	0
Costa Rica	2026	2	0
Total		23	1

Scores and results list Costa Rica's goal tally first, score column indicates score after each Brenes goal.

List of international goals scored by Jefferson Brenes
No.	Date	Venue	Opponent	Score	Result	Competition
1	23 March 2024	Toyota Stadium, Frisco, United States	Honduras	3–1	3–1	2024 Copa América qualifying play-offs
