= Juan Pablo Vargas =

Costa Rican football player (born 1995)

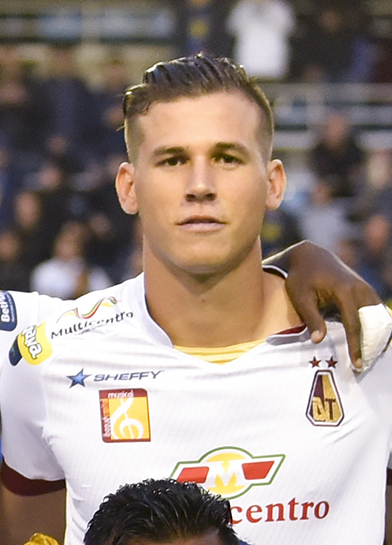
- Vargas with Deportes Tolima in 2019

Personal information
- Full name: Juan Pablo Vargas Campos
- Date of birth: 6 June 1995 (age 31)
- Place of birth: Sarchí, Costa Rica
- Height: 1.94 m (6 ft 4 in)
- Position: Centre back

Team information
- Current team: Puebla
- Number: 4

Youth career
- Alajuelense

Senior career*
Years	Team	Apps	(Gls)
2015–2016	Alajuelense	6	(0)
2016–2017	Jacó Rays	0	(0)
2016–2017	→ Belén (loan)	34	(4)
2017–2020	Herediano	29	(3)
2018–2019	→ Deportes Tolima (loan)	17	(0)
2020	→ Millonarios (loan)	21	(0)
2021–2025	Millonarios	175	(12)
2026–	Puebla	24	(1)

International career^{‡}
2018	Costa Rica U21	3	(0)
2017–	Costa Rica	45	(4)
- * Club domestic league appearances and goals as of 26 September 2026 ‡ National team caps and goals as of 4 October 2026

Juan Pablo Vargas Campos (born 6 June 1995) is a Costa Rican professional footballer who plays as a central defender for Liga MX club Puebla and the Costa Rica national team.

== Club career ==
=== Alajuelense ===
Born in Sarchí, Alajuela, Vargas came through the academy at Liga Deportiva Alajuelense and was promoted to the main squad by coach Óscar Ramírez on 30 May 2013, along with the other youth Ronald Matarrita and Steve Garita. He made his first team debut in the 2013 Costa Rican Cup on 7 July, coming on as a late substitute in a 2–1 away loss against UCR; four days later he scored his first professional goal, netting his team's last in a 3–1 home win against the same opponent.

Vargas was mainly a backup option during the following years, only making his league debut on 18 February 2015 by starting in a 2–1 home loss against Limón. During the 2015–16 season, he only featured in five matches.

=== Herediano ===
==== Loan to Belén and transfer controversy ====
On 8 June 2016, Vargas signed a contract with Herediano, and was immediately loaned to Belén for the entire 2016–17 season. In September, former side Alajuelense complained about his transfer to Herediano, after his federative rights were assigned to Jacó Rays before his loan to Belén; Alajuelense and Herediano only reached an agreement in June 2017, after Alajuelense was assured 50% of a transfer to any foreign club.

In December 2016, Vargas went on a trial at Ascenso MX side Lobos BUAP, but nothing came of it. He was an undisputed starter for Belén during the season, scoring four goals in 34 league appearances.

==== Breakthrough ====
In May 2017, Vargas returned to Herediano. A backup option during the 2017 Apertura, he became a first-choice during the 2018 Clausura; his side finished second in both tournaments, losing both in the Finals.

==== Loan to Deportes Tolima ====
On 1 August 2018, Vargas moved abroad and joined Liga DIMAYOR side Deportes Tolima on loan. He failed to make an appearance during the remainder of the year, and only made his debut for the club on 23 January 2019, replacing Luis González late into a 2–1 away win over Atlético Junior, for the year's Superliga Colombiana.

Vargas became a regular starter for Tolima before suffering a knee injury in July 2019, which kept him out for nearly three months. He left the club in December, after his loan expired.

=== Millonarios ===
On 3 January 2020, Vargas joined Millonarios on loan for the year. On 30 December, after being regularly used, he was bought outright and signed a permanent three-year contract with the club.

Vargas has achieved great form playing for Millonarios and has been called the best defender playing in the Colombian league, with some tongue-in-cheek comparisons with Lionel Messi after an assist in a 4–1 win against Cortuluá. Vargas played as Millionarios reached the final of the Copa Colombia in September 2022.

== International career ==
Vargas made his senior Costa Rica debut at the 2017 Copa Centroamericana, playing in a 3–0 win over Belize on 15 January 2017. He scored his first goal for the national team in a 2022 FIFA World Cup qualification match against the United States, netting the opener in a 2–0 victory on 30 March 2022.

In November 2022, Vargas was named to Costa Rica's squad for the 2022 FIFA World Cup. He made his debut in the competition on 1 December, starting in a 4–2 loss to Germany where he scored the second goal for his country.

== Career statistics ==
=== Club ===
As of 26 September 2026

Club	Season	League			Cup		Continental		Other		Total	
Club	Season	Division	Apps	Goals	Apps	Goals	Apps	Goals	Apps	Goals	Apps	Goals
Alajuelense	2013–14	Liga FPD	0	0	2	1	—		—		2	1
Alajuelense	2014–15	Liga FPD	1	0	0	0	—		—		1	0
Alajuelense	2015–16	Liga FPD	5	0	1	0	—		—		6	0
Alajuelense	Total		6	0	3	1	—		—		9	1
Belén	2016–17	Liga FPD	34	4	0	0	—		—		34	4
Herediano	2017–18	Liga FPD	29	3	0	0	2 (Note: Appearance(s) in CONCACAF Champions Cup)	0	—		31	3
Deportes Tolima	2018	Liga DIMAYOR	0	0	0	0	—		—		0	0
Deportes Tolima	2019	Liga DIMAYOR	17	0	1	0	2 (Note: Appearance(s) in Copa Libertadores)	0	1 (Note: Appearance(s) in Superliga Colombiana)	0	21	0
Deportes Tolima	Total		17	0	1	0	2	0	1	0	21	0
Millonarios	2020	Liga DIMAYOR	21	1	0	0	4 (Note: Appearance(s) in Copa Sudamericana)	0	—		25	1
Millonarios	2021	Liga DIMAYOR	35	0	2	0	—		—		37	0
Millonarios	2022	Liga DIMAYOR	33	2	5	0	2	0	—		40	2
Millonarios	2023	Liga DIMAYOR	34	6	0	0	9 (Note: Four appearances in Copa Libertadores, five appearances in Copa Sudamericana)	0	—		43	6
Millonarios	2024	Liga DIMAYOR	37	3	1	0	6	0	—		44	3
Millonarios	2025	Liga DIMAYOR	15	0	1	0	1	0	—		17	0
Millonarios	Total		175	12	9	0	22	0	—		206	12
Puebla	2025–26	Liga MX	14	1	—		—		—		14	1
Puebla	2026–27	Liga MX	10	0	—		—		2 (Note: Appearances in Leagues Cup)	0	12	0
Puebla	Total		24	1	—		—		2	0	26	1
Career total			285	20	13	1	26	0	3	0	327	21

=== International ===
As of 4 October 2026

Appearances and goals by national team and year
National team	Year	Apps	Goals
Costa Rica	2017	1	0
Costa Rica	2018	1	0
Costa Rica	2019	2	0
Costa Rica	2020	1	0
Costa Rica	2022	9	2
Costa Rica	2023	7	1
Costa Rica	2024	9	0
Costa Rica	2025	11	1
Costa Rica	2026	4	0
Total		45	4

List of international goals scored by Juan Pablo Vargas
No.	Date	Venue	Opponent	Score	Result	Competition
1.	30 March 2022	Estadi Nacional, San José, Costa Rica	United States	1–0	2–0	2022 FIFA World Cup qualification
2.	1 December 2022	Al Bayt Stadium, Al Khor, Qatar	Germany	2–1	2–4	2022 FIFA World Cup
3.	4 July 2023	Red Bull Arena, Harrison, United States	Martinique	3–1	6–4	2023 CONCACAF Gold Cup
4.	9 September 2025	Esatdi Nacional, San José, Costa Rica	Haiti	3–3	3–3	2026 FIFA World Cup qualification

== Honours ==
Millonarios

- Copa Colombia: 2022
- Liga DIMAYOR: 2023 Apertura
- Superliga Colombiana: 2024
