= 2022–23 Liga FPD =

Liga FPD
- Season: 2022–23
- Dates: 17 July 2022 – 14 May 2023
- Champions: Apertura: Saprissa (38th title); Clausura: Alajuelense (31st title); Grand Final: Saprissa
- Champions Cup: TBD
- UNCAF Cup: Alajuelense; Cartaginés; Herediano; Saprissa

The 2022–23 Liga FPD was the 102nd season since of the Liga FPD, the highest tier of football in Costa Rica. The season was divided into two halves: the Apertura, which was played from 17 July 2022 to 5 November 2022, and the Clausura, which was played from 14 January 2023 to 28 May 2023.

Saprissa won the 2022 Apertura, while Alajuelense won the 2023 Clausura. Saprissa won the Grand Final, defeating Alajuelense 3–2 on aggregate.

== Stadiums and locations ==
Locations of the 2019-20 Costa Rican FPD teams

Team	Location	Stadium	Capacity
Alajuelense	Alajuela	Alejandro Morera Soto	18,000
Belén	Belén	Polideportivo de Belén	3,000
Carmelita	Alajuela	Alejandro Morera Soto	18,000
Cartaginés	Cartago	"Fello" Meza	13,500
Herediano	Heredia	Eladio Rosabal Cordero	8,500
Liberia	Liberia	Edgardo Baltodano	6,000
Limón	Limón	Juan Gobán	3,000
Pérez Zeledón	San Isidro	Municipal Pérez Zeledón	6,000
Santos	Limón	Ebal Rodríguez	3,000
Saprissa	San José	Ricardo Saprissa	23,000
San Carlos	Quesada	Carlos Ugalde Álvarez	5,600
UCR	San José	Estadio Ecológico	1,800

=== Personnel, kits and Stadia ===
Note: Table lists in alphabetical order.

Team	Manager	Kit manufacturer	Shirt sponsor(s)	Stadium	Capacity
Alajuelense	(Argentina) Andrés Carevic	Kelme	kölbi	Alejandro Morera Soto	18,000
Cartaginés	(Costa Rica) Hernán Medford	Joma	Premium Carroceria y Pintura	"Fello" Meza	13,500
Municipal Grecia	(Mexico) Fernando Palomeque	Living Sports	Super Rosvil	Estadio Allen Riggioni	4,000
Guadalupe F.C.	(Costa Rica) Géiner Segura	ProSport	Yustin Suministros	Estadio José Joaquín "Coyella" Fonseca	4,500
Herediano	(Argentina) José Giacone	Umbro	Tigo	Eladio Rosabal Cordero	15,000
Jicaral	(Costa Rica) Jeaustin Campos	ProSport	Sardimar	Estadio de la Asociación Cívica Jicaraleña	1,000
Limón	(Costa Rica) Ricardo Allen Thomas	Sportek	APM Terminals	Estadio Juan Gobán	2,600
Pérez Zeledón	(Colombia) Omar Royero	Textiles JB	kölbi	Municipal de Pérez Zeledón	6,100
San Carlos	(Costa Rica) Luis Marín	ARN	Dos Pinos	Estadio Carlos Ugalde Álvarez	5,600
Santos	(Costa Rica) Johnny Chaves	Capelli Sport	Grupo Colono	Ebal Rodríguez	4,500
Saprissa	(Costa Rica) Walter Centeno	Kappa	kölbi	Ricardo Saprissa	24,000
UCR	(Costa Rica) Luis Diego Arnáez	Saeta	TBD	Estadio Jorge Hernán "Cuty" Monge	5,500

== Torneo Apertura ==
The Apertura 2022 was the first tournament of the season. The regular season began on 17 July and concluded on 2 October 2022. The playoffs began on 15 October and concluded on 5 November 2022. The Apertura ended early due to the 2022 FIFA World Cup being played in December 2022. Saprissa won the Apertura tournament.

=== Table ===
==== Group A ====
Pos	Team	Pld	W	D	L	GF	GA	GD	Pts	Qualification or relegation
1	Herediano	16	11	5	0	37	14	+23	38	Advance to Semifinals
2	Alajuelense	16	9	4	3	26	18	+8	31	Advance to Semifinals
3	Sporting San José	16	6	4	6	29	26	+3	22	
4	Guadalupe	16	5	1	10	19	29	−10	16	
5	Santos de Guápiles	16	2	6	8	19	29	−10	12	
6	Guanacasteca	16	2	3	11	9	28	−19	9	

Updated to match(es) played on unknown. Source:
Rules for classification: 1) points; 2) goal difference; 3) goals scored; 4) head-to-head points; 5) head-to-head goal difference; 6) head-to-head goals scored; 7) draw

==== Group B ====
Pos	Team	Pld	W	D	L	GF	GA	GD	Pts	Qualification or relegation
1	Saprissa	16	11	3	2	28	10	+18	36	Advance to Semifinals
2	Puntarenas	16	6	7	3	22	16	+6	25	Advance to Semifinals
3	Grecia	16	7	0	9	28	35	−7	21	
4	San Carlos	16	5	5	6	19	23	−4	20	
5	Pérez Zeledón	16	6	1	9	19	25	−6	19	
6	Cartaginés	16	4	5	7	25	27	−2	17	

Updated to match(es) played on unknown. Source:
Rules for classification: 1) points; 2) goal difference; 3) goals scored; 4) head-to-head points; 5) head-to-head goal difference; 6) head-to-head goals scored; 7) draw

=== Final phase – Apertura 2022 ===
==== Bracket ====
Semi-finals
A1	Herediano	0	3	3
B2	Puntarenas	0	1	1
B1	Saprissa	0	2	2
A2	Alajuelense	0	0	0

Finals
A1	Herediano	1	0	1
B1	Saprissa	1	1	2

==== Semi-finals ====
The first legs were played on 8–9 October and the second legs were played on 14–15 October 2022.

Team 1	Agg.	Team 2	1st leg	2nd leg
Alajuelense	0–2	Saprissa	0–0	0–2
Herediano	3–1	Puntarenas	0–0	3–1

==== Finals ====
The first leg was played on 30 October and the second leg was played on 5 November 2022.

Team 1	Agg.	Team 2	1st leg	2nd leg
Saprissa	2–1	Herediano	1–1	1–0

=== Attendances ===
Deportivo Saprissa drew the highest average home attendance in the Apertura.

#	Football club	Home games	Average attendance
1	Deportivo Saprissa	8	4,764
2	Sporting FC	8	4,331
3	Alajuelense	8	4,075
4	Puntarenas FC	8	3,763
5	CS Herediano	8	2,573
6	CS Cartaginés	8	2,156
7	Municipal Pérez Zeledón	8	1,781
8	AD Guanacasteca	8	1,600
9	AD San Carlos	8	1,343
10	Santos de Guápiles	8	1,308
11	Municipal Grecia	8	1,200
12	Guadalupe FC	8	1,121

== Torneo Clausura ==
The Clausura 2023 was the second and tournament of the season. The regular season began on 14 January and concluded on 7 May 2023. The playoffs began on 14 May and concluded on 28 May 2023. Alajuelense won the Clausura tournament.

== Grand Final ==
The grand final was played between the Apertura and Clausura champion to determine the overall champion of the 2022–23 season. Saprissa defeated Alajuelense, 3–2, on aggregate.

25 May 2023
19:00

Alajuelense	1–0	Saprissa
Mora 44'	Report

Estadio Alejandro Soto, Alajuela
Attendance: 17,895
Referee: Hugo Cruz
28 May 2023
17:00

Saprissa	3–1	Alajuelense
Madrigal 19'; East 25'; Paradela 45+2'	Report	Borges 77' (pen.)

Estadio Ricardo Saprissa, San José
Attendance: 23,112
Referee: Pedro Navarro

Saprissa won 3–2 on aggregate.

== Aggregate table ==
While the Apertura and Clausura winners earned berths to the 2023 CONCACAF Central American Cup, the best aggregate finishers not to win either title earned berths into the tournament.
