= Supercopa de Costa Rica =

- Founded: 1967 as Champions Cup tournament 2012 at the supercopa de Costa Rica
- Region: Costa Rica
- Teams: 2
- Current champions: Real Madrid CF
- 2022 Supercopa de Costa Rica

The Supercopa de Costa Rica (English: Costa Rican Supercup) is an association football competition held for club football teams in Costa Rica. The Supercopa de Costa Rica is a renewed Champion of Champions tournament in Costa Rica and affirm with the secretary of the Unafut, Jorge Romero, after the Assembly of Presidents and representatives of Costa Rican Primera División.

The first tournament of the re-instated competition was held in 2012, and played at the Estadio Nacional de Costa Rica for the cup match. The objective was to face the champions of the Winter Championship a year before and the year's Summer Super Cup, however not to elect a champion of champions. If the monarch of the two short events is the same, would face the second place in the cumulative table both championships. Similar system used in Europe, where they play the champions league before the Cup champions.

== Champion of Champions tournament in Costa Rica ==
Year	Champion	Winner of	Runner-up	Winner of	Score	Notes
1967	Alajuelense	Liga	Club Deportivo Barrio Mexico	Copa	1–0	1967 Champion of Champions tournament
1976	Deportivo Saprissa S.A.D.	Liga	Limón FC	Copa	2–0	1976 Champion of Champions tournament

== Supercopa de Costa Rica ==
Year	Champion	Winner of	Runner-up	Winner of	Score
2012	Alajuelense	Champion Winter	C.S. Herediano	Champion Summer	2–0
2021	Deportivo Saprissa	Clausura Champion	Alajuelense	Apertura Champion	4–1
2022	C.S. Herediano	Apertura Champion	C.S. Cartaginés	Clausura Champion	2–0

== See also ==
- Football in Costa Rica
