= 2022 FIFA World Cup qualification (CONCACAF–OFC play-off) =

- Event: 2022 FIFA World Cup qualification
Costa Rica	New Zealand
1	0
- Date: 14 June 2022
- Venue: Ahmad bin Ali Stadium, Al Rayyan, Qatar
- Referee: Mohammed Abdulla Hassan Mohamed (United Arab Emirates)
- Attendance: 10,803
- Weather: Fair; 31 °C (88 °F); 84% humidity

The 2022 FIFA World Cup qualification CONCACAF–OFC play-off was a single-leg match between the fourth-placed team of the CONCACAF qualification third round, Costa Rica, and the winners from the OFC qualification, New Zealand. Before their identity was known, the winners of the play-off had already been allocated to Group E at the World Cup.

The match was played on 14 June 2022 at the Ahmad bin Ali Stadium in Al Rayyan, Qatar. Costa Rica won the match 1–0 to qualify for the 2022 FIFA World Cup.

== Background ==
The draw for the inter-confederation play-offs fixtures was held on 26 November 2021.

The teams had met once, a friendly won 4–0 by Costa Rica at the Estadio Ricardo Saprissa Aymá in San José on 24 March 2007. Current Costa Rican captain Bryan Ruiz, then 21 years old, scored a goal and gave an assist in that match. He is also the only player from that match to remain active with his national team. Current New Zealand coach Danny Hay also played in that match.

The match was the second inter-confederation play-off for Costa Rica, having previously lost 1–2 on aggregate to Uruguay in 2009. Since the OFC had no direct qualification spots, New Zealand reached the intercontinental play-offs for the fourth consecutive time, winning the first (against Bahrain in 2009) and losing the remaining two (against Mexico in 2013 and against Peru in 2017).

Costa Rica had a complicated start of the qualifying process. During the first half of the CONCACAF qualification third round, Costa Rica stood fifth at only six points out of twenty-one, five points behind Panama, then the fourth-placed team. The second half of the round began on 16 November 2021; that night, as Costa Rica was drawing a home match against Honduras, their gap against the Panamanians almost increased to seven points; however, a late goal by Gerson Torres gave a crucial victory for the Ticos, who from then onwards enrolled in an unprecedented comeback, with six victories and one draw that saw them overtaking Panama, ending Canada's undefeated streak, and finishing fourth of the table, with only the goal difference preventing them to overtake the United States for the third place.

Marked by several delays due to effects of the COVID-19 pandemic such as travel restrictions that national teams couldn't be able to travel in those countries, the OFC qualification round announced the tournament scheduled to be held in Qatar (host country of the World Cup) in March 2022. New Zealand won the tournament and qualified to the play-off match against the fourth-placed team of the CONCACAF qualification third round, who was unknown at the time.

The group stage draw of the World Cup took place on 1 April 2022, leaving the CONCACAF–OFC play-off winners allocated in Group E, alongside Spain, Japan, and Germany. Later, in May, FIFA revealed the stadium that would host both the AFC vs CONMEBOL and CONCACAF vs OFC play-off matches: the Ahmad bin Ali Stadium in Al Rayyan, Qatar. The winners of the CONCACAF vs OFC play-off match would return to the stadium at the World Cup to face Japan on 27 November.

== Venue ==
City	Stadium	Location of the host city of the match.
Al Rayyan (Doha Area)	Ahmad bin Ali Stadium	Location of the host city of the match.
Capacity: 45,032		Location of the host city of the match.

== Match ==
=== Summary ===
Three minutes into the match, Joel Campbell received a cross from Jewison Bennette to score the lone goal. At the 39th minute, Chris Wood scored a goal after a poor clearance by Yeltsin Tejeda. However, his goal was nullified as the video assistant referee (VAR) showed that Matthew Garbett had fouled Óscar Duarte prior to the goal. The VAR was also used at the 69th minute, after Kosta Barbarouses, who had been subbed in just nine minutes prior, tackled Francisco Calvo's ankle. Referee Mohammed Abdulla Hassan Mohamed originally showed Barbarouses a yellow card, but after checking the VAR, Hassan changed it to a red card, leaving New Zealand down to ten men for the rest of the match.

The refereeing caused frustration in the New Zealand team. Coach Danny Hay said that "FIFA has let us down" because of the relative inexperience of the referees compared to the European officials for the Australia vs Peru match. Former Costa Rican referee Ramón Luis Méndez considered both the goal disallowance and the red card as valid decisions, but questioned why the VAR did not check a foul by Kendall Waston on Chris Wood that should have been a penalty.

=== Details ===
14 June 2022
21:00 UTC+3

Costa Rica	1–0	New Zealand
Campbell 3'	Report

Ahmad bin Ali Stadium, Al Rayyan (Qatar)
Attendance: 10,803
Referee: Mohammed Abdulla Hassan Mohamed (United Arab Emirates)

Costa Rica	New Zealand

GK	1	Keylor Navas (c)
RB	4	Keysher Fuller		(substituted off) 46'
CB	6	Óscar Duarte
CB	15	Francisco Calvo
LB	8	Bryan Oviedo
RM	13	Gerson Torres		(substituted off) 46'
CM	5	Celso Borges		(substituted off) 79'
CM	17	Yeltsin Tejeda
LM	9	Jewison Bennette		(substituted off) 46'
CF	7	Anthony Contreras	(yellow card) 90+2'
CF	12	Joel Campbell		(substituted off) 90+3'
Substitutes:
GK	18	Aarón Cruz
GK	23	Leonel Moreira
DF	3	Juan Pablo Vargas
DF	16	Ian Lawrence
DF	19	Kendall Waston		(substituted on) 46'
DF	20	Daniel Chacón		(substituted on) 79'
DF	22	Carlos Martínez		(substituted on) 46'
MF	2	Carlos Mora
MF	10	Bryan Ruiz	(yellow card) 90+4'	(substituted on) 46'
MF	14	Orlando Galo
MF	21	Brandon Aguilera
FW	11	Johan Venegas		(substituted on) 90+3'
Manager:
(Colombia) Luis Fernando Suárez

GK	1	Oliver Sail
CB	6	Bill Tuiloma
CB	2	Winston Reid (c)	(yellow card) 70'	(substituted off) 72'
CB	4	Nando Pijnaker
DM	8	Joe Bell
CM	15	Clayton Lewis		(substituted off) 79'
CM	19	Matthew Garbett		(substituted off) 60'
RW	20	Niko Kirwan		(substituted off) 79'
LW	13	Liberato Cacace
CF	11	Alex Greive		(substituted off) 60'
CF	9	Chris Wood
Substitutes:
GK	12	Stefan Marinovic
GK	23	Matthew Gould
DF	3	Francis de Vries
DF	5	Tommy Smith
DF	16	Michael Boxall
DF	21	Tim Payne		(substituted on) 79'
MF	7	Kosta Barbarouses	(red card) 69'	(substituted on) 60'
MF	10	Marko Stamenic		(substituted on) 79'
FW	14	Elijah Just		(substituted on) 72'
FW	17	Logan Rogerson
FW	18	Joe Champness
FW	22	Ben Waine		(substituted on) 60'
Manager:
Danny Hay

Man of the Match:
Keylor Navas (Costa Rica)

Assistant referees:
Mohamed Al-Hammadi (United Arab Emirates)
Hasan Al-Mahri (United Arab Emirates)
Fourth official:
Abdulrahman Al-Jassim (Qatar)
Reserve assistant referee:
Saud Al-Maqaleh (Qatar)
Video assistant referee:
Abdulla Al-Marri (Qatar)
Assistant video assistant referees:
Khamis Al-Marri (Qatar)
Taleb Al-Marri (Qatar)

Match rules

- 90 minutes
- 30 minutes of extra time if necessary
- Penalty shoot-out if scores still level
- Twelve named substitutes
- Maximum of five substitutions, with a sixth allowed in extra time (Note: Each team was given only three opportunities to make substitutions, with a fourth opportunity in extra time, excluding substitutions made at half-time, before the start of extra time and at half-time in extra time.)
