= 2022 FIFA World Cup Group B =

State of association football tournament

Group B of the 2022 FIFA World Cup took place from 21 to 29 November 2022. The group consisted of national association football teams from England, Iran, the United States and Wales. Both England and the United States progressed to the round of 16 undefeated. England won the group, winning two games and drawing the other, while the United States won one game and drew the other two. Iran finished the group third, having won a game, with Wales finishing fourth with a single point.

Initially noted for unusually containing four teams all ranked in the top 20 at the time of the tournament, as well as two teams within the same sovereign state and other geopolitical conflicts, various incidents relating to Qatar's ban on LGBTQ+ symbols affected the games on the first match day.

== Teams ==
The teams were decided by the World Cup draw that took place on 1 April 2022. The group was set to receive one team from each pot, which sorted all World Cup teams by position on the FIFA World Rankings. The first team drawn was England, which secured qualification as a pot one team by winning Group I of UEFA qualification. The second pot team, the United States, qualified by finishing third in CONCACAF qualification. The third team was Iran, which won Group A of the AFC third round. The final team was not known at the time of the draw, as it was the UEFA second round Path A winner. Wales defeated Ukraine 1–0 to qualify for this position.

Group B was widely described as the "group of death" before the tournament. It had the highest average FIFA ranking of any group, and controversy given the political hostility between Iran and the United Kingdom, and between Iran and the United States.

FIFA World Cup Group B draw
Draw position	Team	Pot	Confederation	Method of qualification	Date of qualification	Finals appearance	Last appearance	Previous best performance	FIFA Rankings	
Draw position	Team	Pot	Confederation	Method of qualification	Date of qualification	Finals appearance	Last appearance	Previous best performance	March 2022 (Note: The rankings of March 2022 were used for seeding for the final draw.)	October 2022
B1	England	1	UEFA	UEFA Group I winners	15 November 2021	16th	2018	Winners (1966)	5	5
B2	Iran	3	AFC	AFC third round Group A winners	27 January 2022	6th	2018	Group stage (1978, 1998, 2006, 2014, 2018)	21	20
B3	United States	2	CONCACAF	CONCACAF third round third place	30 March 2022	11th	2014	Third place (1930)	15	16
B4	Wales	4 (Note: As the identity of the UEFA second round Path A winners was not known at the time of the final draw, positions in the FIFA Rankings were not taken into account, and the placeholder in the draw was automatically seeded into pot 4.)	UEFA	UEFA second round Path A winners	5 June 2022	2nd	1958	Quarter-finals (1958)	18	19

== LGBT symbol incidents ==
=== Captains' armbands ===
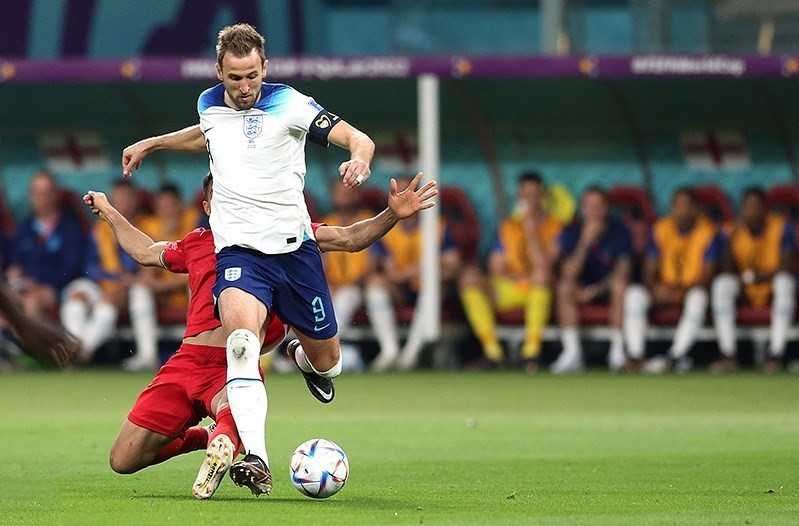
Harry Kane in England's first match, wearing a FIFA "No discrimination" armband

England captain Harry Kane, Wales captain Gareth Bale, and several other European captains intended to wear OneLove rainbow armbands promoting acceptance and diversity during the World Cup; shortly before England's opening match (the first match to feature one of these nations), however, FIFA announced that players wearing these armbands would face "unlimited" sanctions, with a yellow card given at minimum. The affected football associations said they would not put their players in this position, criticising FIFA for the ruling. A spokesperson for Rishi Sunak, the British Prime Minister, also criticised FIFA for introducing player punishment for the armbands. After the first United States match, and though the US had not been intending to wear the armband, Antony Blinken, the United States Secretary of State, described the ban as "concerning".

At the England–Iran match, BBC pundit and former England women's team captain Alex Scott chose to wear a OneLove armband while being interviewed pitchside ahead of the match, a move that was praised on social media. At the United States–Wales match, though she did not appear on screen, German ZDF broadcaster Claudia Neumann wore a rainbow armband and Pride shirt, later telling the Sport-Informations-Dienst that she wanted to set an example, lamenting that the captains would not be able to wear the armbands. England would change their armband to one that simply read "no discrimination". During England's second match, the Wembley Stadium arch, iconic of the team's home stadium, was lit up in rainbow colours.

=== Other Pride items ===
Many Wales fans in attendance at their first match as part of the nation's official LGBTQ+ supporters group wore the group's rainbow Wales bucket hats. Women who had these hats, including former women's team captain Laura McAllister, were prohibited from entering the stadium with them; McAllister reported that the security officials told her it was "a banned symbol". At the same match, American journalist Grant Wahl was reportedly detained for 25 minutes when attempting to enter the stadium wearing a Pride shirt, being told it was "political" and being asked if he was British; he said that FIFA later apologised to him and security allowed him to enter with the shirt.

After the match, the Football Association of Wales confronted FIFA about the confiscation of the bucket hats, and FIFA entered talks with the Qatari Supreme Committee to discuss Qatar's commitment to make all fans welcome at the World Cup, also citing an incident of an American fan with a rainbow flag being harassed.

== Standings ==
Pos	Team	Pld	W	D	L	GF	GA	GD	Pts	Qualification
1	England	3	2	1	0	9	2	+7	7	Advance to knockout stage
2	United States	3	1	2	0	2	1	+1	5	Advance to knockout stage
3	Iran	3	1	0	2	4	7	−3	3	
4	Wales	3	0	1	2	1	6	−5	1	

Source: FIFA
Rules for classification: Group stage tiebreakers

In the round of 16:

- The winners of Group B, England, advanced to play the runners-up of Group A, Senegal.
- The runners-up of Group B, the United States, advanced to play the winners of Group A, the Netherlands.

== Matches ==
Matches took place between 21 and 29 November 2022. All times listed are local, AST (UTC+3).

=== England vs Iran ===
The opening match of Group B was contested between England and Iran. The two sides had never played each other before including in a competitive match. Many England supporters missed the start of the match due to problems with FIFA's ticketing app. In defiance of their government, the Iranian team refused to sing their national anthem ahead of the match, a sign of support for the Mahsa Amini protests in their own country. Many Iranian women, some of them bearing protest signs, were in attendance at the match, a gesture which by itself was considered an act of protest as women are barred from football matches in Iran.

The match was delayed for seven minutes in the first half after a clash of heads between Iranian teammates, goalkeeper Alireza Beiranvand and defender Majid Hosseini. Beiranvand initially seemed to be convinced to continue playing by Iran captain Ehsan Hajsafi despite appearing to be dazed and taking his gloves and shirt off after he received treatment, drawing criticism from the brain injury charity Headway. After collapsing on the field minutes later, Iran used a concussion substitution to replace Beiranvand with Hossein Hosseini. England scored three first-half goals: Jude Bellingham opened with his first ever senior England goal in the 35th minute (becoming the first player born in the 21st century to score a goal in a World Cup), with Bukayo Saka (in the 43rd minute) and Raheem Sterling (in the first minute of stoppage time) being the other contributors to the scoreline up to this point.

In the second half, England's Saka scored his second of the game in the 62nd minute, before Iran's Mehdi Taremi scored with their first shot on target. England defender Harry Maguire was then removed from play after also suffering a head injury. Substitute Marcus Rashford, who had been introduced a minute before, scored England's fifth goal with his third touch of the game. Shortly into stoppage time, Jack Grealish scored England's sixth goal. The final goal was scored from a contentious penalty kick for Iran, awarded only after a review of a late-occurring foul was suggested by the VAR. Taremi converted from the penalty kick with the final score being 6–2.

The Iranian media blamed the "humiliating" loss on the protests in their country affecting their players' mindset, additionally claiming that the United States and its allies, including the United Kingdom, had manufactured the protests to disrupt Iran; though these nations comprise all of Iran's group stage competition, the line of blame is common due to longstanding political tensions. Iran manager Queiroz had supported protests by players prior to the tournament, then said that such protests were "not welcomed" following the loss.

21 November 2022
16:00

England	6–2	Iran
Bellingham 35'; Saka 43', 62'; Sterling 45+1'; Rashford 71'; Grealish 90'		Taremi 65', 90+13' (pen.)

Khalifa International Stadium, Al Rayyan
Attendance: 45,334
Referee: Raphael Claus (Brazil)

England	Iran

GK	1	Jordan Pickford
RB	12	Kieran Trippier
CB	5	John Stones
CB	6	Harry Maguire	(substituted off) 70'
LB	3	Luke Shaw
CM	22	Jude Bellingham
CM	4	Declan Rice
RW	17	Bukayo Saka	(substituted off) 70'
AM	19	Mason Mount	(substituted off) 70'
LW	10	Raheem Sterling	(substituted off) 70'
CF	9	Harry Kane (c)	(substituted off) 75'
Substitutions:
DF	15	Eric Dier	(substituted on) 70'
FW	11	Marcus Rashford	(substituted on) 70'
MF	20	Phil Foden	(substituted on) 70'
FW	7	Jack Grealish	(substituted on) 70'
FW	24	Callum Wilson	(substituted on) 75'
Manager:
Gareth Southgate

GK	1	Alireza Beiranvand		(substituted off) 20' (con.)
CB	8	Morteza Pouraliganji	(yellow card) 48'
CB	15	Rouzbeh Cheshmi		(substituted off) 46'
CB	19	Majid Hosseini
RWB	2	Sadegh Moharrami
LWB	5	Milad Mohammadi		(substituted off) 63'
RM	7	Alireza Jahanbakhsh	(yellow card) 25'	(substituted off) 46'
CM	21	Ahmad Nourollahi		(substituted off) 77'
CM	18	Ali Karimi		(substituted off) 46'
LM	3	Ehsan Hajsafi (c)
CF	9	Mehdi Taremi
Substitutions:
GK	24	Hossein Hosseini		(substituted on) 20'
MF	6	Saeid Ezatolahi		(substituted on) 46'
DF	13	Hossein Kanaanizadegan		(substituted on) 46'
MF	17	Ali Gholizadeh		(substituted on) 46'
MF	16	Mehdi Torabi		(substituted on) 63'
FW	20	Sardar Azmoun		(substituted on) 77'
Manager:
(Portugal) Carlos Queiroz

Man of the Match:
Bukayo Saka (England)

Assistant referees:
Rodrigo Figueiredo (Brazil)
Danilo Simon Manis (Brazil)
Fourth official:
Kevin Ortega (Peru)
Reserve assistant referee:
Michael Orué (Peru)
Video assistant referee:
Leodán González (Uruguay)
Assistant video assistant referees:
Julio Bascuñán (Chile)
Martin Soppi (Uruguay)
Juan Martínez Munuera (Spain)
Stand-by assistant video assistant referee:
Juan Pablo Belatti (Argentina)

=== United States vs Wales ===
The teams had met twice previously, both in friendly matches: the United States won 2–0 in 2003 and the two teams drew 0–0 in 2020. The game was broadcast on ITV in the United Kingdom, with the network announcing during the broadcast that its technical director, Roger Pearce, had died in Qatar.

The United States scored the opening goal in the 32nd minute when Timothy Weah scored after a pass over the top by Christian Pulisic (and becoming the second player born in the 21st century to score a goal in a World Cup, hours after England's Jude Bellingham). The United States had the better of the chances in the first half, but in the second half Wales improved, particularly after introducing substitute Kieffer Moore. In the second period, Wales had a chance to equalize through Ben Davies, but his header was saved. Wales would nonetheless eventually manage to score their first World Cup goal in 64 years after Bale was fouled in the box by Walker Zimmerman and scored the resulting penalty kick himself. After over nine minutes of stoppage time, the match finished 1–1, with the United States picking up four yellow cards, the most they had received in a World Cup game since their 2002 quarter-final defeat against Germany.

21 November 2022
22:00

United States	1–1	Wales
Weah 36'		Bale 82' (pen.)

Ahmad bin Ali Stadium, Al Rayyan
Attendance: 43,418
Referee: Abdulrahman Al-Jassim (Qatar)

United States	Wales

GK	1	Matt Turner
RB	2	Sergiño Dest	(yellow card) 11'	(substituted off) 74'
CB	3	Walker Zimmerman
CB	13	Tim Ream	(yellow card) 51'
LB	5	Antonee Robinson
DM	4	Tyler Adams (c)
CM	8	Weston McKennie	(yellow card) 13'	(substituted off) 66'
CM	6	Yunus Musah		(substituted off) 75'
RF	21	Timothy Weah		(substituted off) 88'
CF	24	Josh Sargent		(substituted off) 74'
LF	10	Christian Pulisic
Substitutions:
FW	11	Brenden Aaronson		(substituted on) 66'
FW	19	Haji Wright		(substituted on) 74'
DF	22	DeAndre Yedlin		(substituted on) 74'
MF	23	Kellyn Acosta	(yellow card) 90+10'	(substituted on) 75'
FW	16	Jordan Morris		(substituted on) 88'
Manager:
Gregg Berhalter

GK	1	Wayne Hennessey
CB	5	Chris Mepham	(yellow card) 45+2'
CB	6	Joe Rodon
CB	4	Ben Davies
DM	15	Ethan Ampadu		(substituted off) 90+5'
CM	10	Aaron Ramsey
CM	8	Harry Wilson		(substituted off) 90+3'
RW	14	Connor Roberts
LW	3	Neco Williams		(substituted off) 79'
CF	11	Gareth Bale (c)	(yellow card) 40'
CF	20	Daniel James		(substituted off) 46'
Substitutions:
FW	13	Kieffer Moore		(substituted on) 46'
FW	9	Brennan Johnson		(substituted on) 79'
MF	22	Sorba Thomas		(substituted on) 90+3'
MF	16	Joe Morrell		(substituted on) 90+5'
Manager:
Rob Page

Man of the Match:
Gareth Bale (Wales)

Assistant referees:
Taleb Al-Marri (Qatar)
Saud Al-Maqaleh (Qatar)
Fourth official:
Ma Ning (China)
Reserve assistant referee:
Cao Yi (China)
Video assistant referee:
Abdulla Al-Marri (Qatar)
Assistant video assistant referees:
Redouane Jiyed (Morocco)
Mokrane Gourari (Algeria)
Adil Zourak (Morocco)
Stand-by assistant video assistant referee:
Elvis Noupue (Cameroon)

=== Wales vs Iran ===
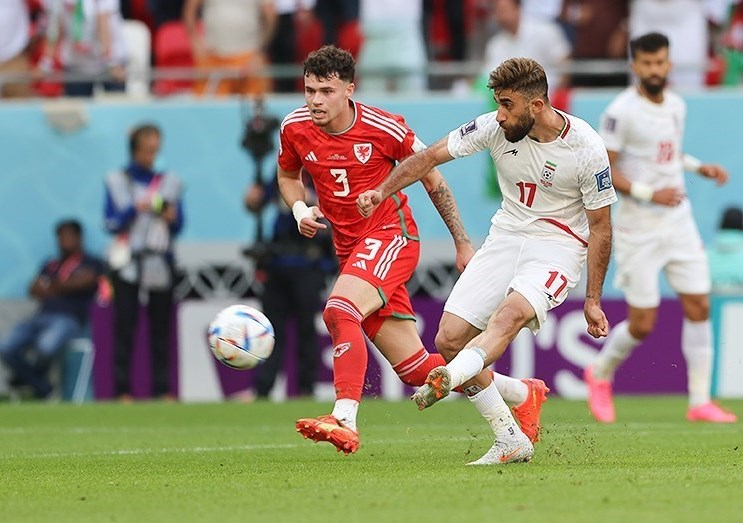
During the match between Wales and Iran

Wales had faced Iran previously only once, a 1–0 friendly win in 1978. The Iranian team opted to sing their national anthem at this match.

The game was driven by Iran in attack and quick counter-attack, with Wales mostly holding in defence; though Wales made attempts in attack, their midfield was described by BBC Sport's Dafydd Pritchard as "worryingly porous". In the first half, Iran had a goal from Ali Gholizadeh disallowed by VAR for offside. Early in the second half, Iran had two attempts hit each post in quick succession. In the 86th minute, Welsh goalkeeper Wayne Hennessey was originally given a yellow card for a foul he committed outside his penalty area. However, following review by VAR, this was upgraded to a red card. Iran substitute Rouzbeh Cheshmi scored the match's first goal eight minutes into stoppage time, followed by Ramin Rezaeian scoring three minutes later to give Iran a first-ever win against a European team at the FIFA World Cup. Cheshmi's goal was the latest-minute match-winning goal scored in any World Cup game (excluding extra time) since the 1966 FIFA World Cup in England, when exact goal times were first made available. Officially, nine minutes of stoppage time were added; with further delays in the added time, over twelve minutes were actually played.

25 November 2022
13:00

Wales	0–2	Iran
		Cheshmi 90+8'; Rezaeian 90+11'

Ahmad bin Ali Stadium, Al Rayyan
Attendance: 40,875
Referee: Mario Escobar (Guatemala)

Wales	Iran

GK	1	Wayne Hennessey	(red card) 86'
CB	5	Chris Mepham
CB	6	Joe Rodon	(yellow card) 45+3'
CB	4	Ben Davies
DM	15	Ethan Ampadu		(substituted off) 77'
CM	10	Aaron Ramsey		(substituted off) 87'
CM	8	Harry Wilson		(substituted off) 57'
RW	14	Connor Roberts		(substituted off) 57'
LW	3	Neco Williams
CF	11	Gareth Bale (c)
CF	13	Kieffer Moore
Substitutions:
FW	9	Brennan Johnson		(substituted on) 57'
FW	20	Daniel James		(substituted on) 57'
MF	7	Joe Allen		(substituted on) 77'
GK	12	Danny Ward		(substituted on) 87'
Manager:
Rob Page

GK	24	Hossein Hosseini
RB	23	Ramin Rezaeian	(yellow card) 90+5'
CB	19	Majid Hosseini
CB	8	Morteza Pouraliganji
LB	5	Milad Mohammadi
RM	17	Ali Gholizadeh		(substituted off) 77'
CM	6	Saeid Ezatolahi		(substituted off) 83'
CM	21	Ahmad Nourollahi		(substituted off) 77'
LM	3	Ehsan Hajsafi (c)		(substituted off) 77'
SS	9	Mehdi Taremi
CF	20	Sardar Azmoun		(substituted off) 68'
Substitutions:
FW	10	Karim Ansarifard		(substituted on) 68'
MF	16	Mehdi Torabi		(substituted on) 77'
MF	7	Alireza Jahanbakhsh	(yellow card) 90+5'	(substituted on) 77'
DF	15	Rouzbeh Cheshmi		(substituted on) 77'
MF	18	Ali Karimi		(substituted on) 83'
Manager:
(Portugal) Carlos Queiroz

Man of the Match:
Rouzbeh Cheshmi (Iran)

Assistant referees:
Caleb Wales (Trinidad and Tobago)
Juan Carlos Mora (Costa Rica)
Fourth official:
Maguette Ndiaye (Senegal)
Reserve assistant referee:
Djibril Camara (Senegal)
Video assistant referee:
Drew Fischer (Canada)
Assistant video assistant referees:
Fernando Guerrero (Mexico)
Nicolás Taran (Uruguay)
Adil Zourak (Morocco)
Stand-by assistant video assistant referee:
Bruno Pires (Brazil)

=== England vs United States ===
The sides had previously met 11 times including twice in the World Cup: the United States famously won 1–0 in the 1950 tournament in Brazil, and the teams drew 1–1 in the 2010 edition in South Africa. Their most recent meeting was a 3–0 friendly victory for England in 2018.

Harry Kane had a shot blocked in the box for England in the 9th minute, before United States midfielder Weston McKennie missed a shot in the six-yard box, and teammate Christian Pulisic hit the crossbar in the 32nd minute. The match featured only a small number of chances, with only four shots on target between the two teams. Despite avoiding defeat, many England fans booed the team after the match ended, expressing criticism of a perceived lacking performance. The U.S. maintained its unbeaten streak of World Cup matches against England since their first meeting in 1950.

25 November 2022
22:00

England	0–0	United States

Al Bayt Stadium, Al Khor
Attendance: 68,463
Referee: Jesús Valenzuela (Venezuela)

England	United States

GK	1	Jordan Pickford
RB	12	Kieran Trippier
CB	5	John Stones
CB	6	Harry Maguire
LB	3	Luke Shaw
CM	22	Jude Bellingham	(substituted off) 68'
CM	4	Declan Rice
RW	17	Bukayo Saka	(substituted off) 77'
AM	19	Mason Mount
LW	10	Raheem Sterling	(substituted off) 68'
CF	9	Harry Kane (c)
Substitutions:
FW	7	Jack Grealish	(substituted on) 68'
MF	8	Jordan Henderson	(substituted on) 68'
FW	11	Marcus Rashford	(substituted on) 77'
Manager:
Gareth Southgate

GK	1	Matt Turner
RB	2	Sergiño Dest	(substituted off) 77'
CB	3	Walker Zimmerman
CB	13	Tim Ream
LB	5	Antonee Robinson
RM	8	Weston McKennie	(substituted off) 77'
CM	4	Tyler Adams (c)
CM	6	Yunus Musah
LM	10	Christian Pulisic
CF	21	Timothy Weah	(substituted off) 83'
CF	19	Haji Wright	(substituted off) 83'
Substitutions:
FW	11	Brenden Aaronson	(substituted on) 77'
DF	18	Shaq Moore	(substituted on) 77'
FW	7	Giovanni Reyna	(substituted on) 83'
FW	24	Josh Sargent	(substituted on) 83'
Manager:
Gregg Berhalter

Man of the Match:
Christian Pulisic (United States)

Assistant referees:
Jorge Urrego (Venezuela)
Tulio Moreno (Venezuela)
Fourth official:
Yoshimi Yamashita (Japan)
Reserve assistant referee:
Neuza Back (Brazil)
Video assistant referee:
Juan Soto (Venezuela)
Assistant video assistant referees:
Nicolás Gallo (Colombia)
Diego Bonfá (Argentina)
Julio Bascuñán (Chile)
Stand-by assistant video assistant referee:
Ezequiel Brailovsky (Argentina)

=== Wales vs England ===
The teams had met 103 times, most recently in a friendly game in 2020 won 3–0 by England. This was their second meeting in a major tournament, the first being the group stage of UEFA Euro 2016, which ended in a 2–1 win for England. The teams had met in multiple FIFA World Cup qualifiers, including two British Home Championship matches that served as World Cup qualifiers (in 1949–50 and 1953–54), as well as in the 1974 and 2006 qualification campaigns.

Marcus Rashford had the best chance of the opening period, but his chipped shot was saved by Wales goalkeeper Danny Ward. Wales defender Neco Williams suffered a head injury in the 24th minute after blocking a shot and was allowed to continue playing, but was reassessed 12 minutes later and replaced with a suspected concussion. Following a goalless first half, Rashford scored a direct free kick in the 50th minute to give England the lead. Shortly after the restart, England would double the lead after Rashford won the ball in the Welsh defence and passed to Harry Kane, whose crossed ball low from the right was converted at the back post by Phil Foden. Rashford got his second of the game in the 68th minute, with a shot from deep inside the Welsh penalty area that went through the goalkeeper's legs. The victory was enough for England to finish at the top of the group, while Wales finished at the bottom with just one point.

29 November 2022
22:00

Wales	0–3	England
		Rashford 50', 68'; Foden 51'

Ahmad bin Ali Stadium, Al Rayyan
Attendance: 44,297
Referee: Slavko Vinčić (Slovenia)

Wales	England

GK	12	Danny Ward
RB	3	Neco Williams		(substituted off) 36' (con.)
CB	5	Chris Mepham
CB	6	Joe Rodon
LB	4	Ben Davies		(substituted off) 57'
DM	15	Ethan Ampadu
CM	10	Aaron Ramsey	(yellow card) 61'
CM	7	Joe Allen		(substituted off) 81'
RF	11	Gareth Bale (c)		(substituted off) 46'
CF	13	Kieffer Moore
LF	20	Daniel James	(yellow card) 29'	(substituted off) 77'
Substitutions:
DF	14	Connor Roberts		(substituted on) 36'
FW	9	Brennan Johnson		(substituted on) 46'
MF	16	Joe Morrell		(substituted on) 57'
MF	8	Harry Wilson		(substituted on) 77'
MF	25	Rubin Colwill		(substituted on) 81'
Manager:
Rob Page

GK	1	Jordan Pickford
RB	2	Kyle Walker	(substituted off) 57'
CB	5	John Stones
CB	6	Harry Maguire
LB	3	Luke Shaw	(substituted off) 65'
DM	4	Declan Rice	(substituted off) 57'
CM	8	Jordan Henderson
CM	22	Jude Bellingham
RF	20	Phil Foden
CF	9	Harry Kane (c)	(substituted off) 57'
LF	11	Marcus Rashford	(substituted off) 75'
Substitutions:
DF	18	Trent Alexander-Arnold	(substituted on) 57'
FW	24	Callum Wilson	(substituted on) 57'
MF	14	Kalvin Phillips	(substituted on) 57'
DF	12	Kieran Trippier	(substituted on) 65'
FW	7	Jack Grealish	(substituted on) 75'
Manager:
Gareth Southgate

Man of the Match:
Marcus Rashford (England)

Assistant referees:
Tomaž Klančnik (Slovenia)
Andraž Kovačič (Slovenia)
Fourth official:
Yoshimi Yamashita (Japan)
Reserve assistant referee:
Karen Díaz Medina (Mexico)
Video assistant referee:
Marco Fritz (Germany)
Assistant video assistant referees:
Paolo Valeri (Italy)
Paweł Sokolnicki (Poland)
Bastian Dankert (Germany)
Stand-by assistant video assistant referee:
Vasile Marinescu (Romania)

=== Iran vs United States ===
The teams had met twice previously: Iran won 2–1 during the 1998 FIFA World Cup in France, and the teams drew 1–1 in a 2000 friendly. Prior to the match, the United States Soccer Federation displayed the flag of Iran on social media without the emblem of the country. The removal of the emblem showed support for the women in Iran fighting for basic human rights, according to the Federation. In response, Iranian state media reported that the United States should be immediately removed from the tournament and suspended for ten games for a "distorted image" of the country's flag. Following this, the emblem was returned to the flag.

Both teams were guaranteed qualification to the round of 16 with a win, while Iran would qualify with a draw, provided Wales did not defeat England. Christian Pulisic scored the only goal of the game for the United States in the 38th minute, scoring from close range after the ball had been headed back from the right by Sergiño Dest with Pulisic being injured in the process of scoring the goal after colliding with Iranian goalkeeper Alireza Beiranvand. The United States thus advanced to the round of 16 as group runners-up with five points, whilst England finished top of the group with seven.

29 November 2022
22:00

Iran	0–1	United States
		Pulisic 38'

Al Thumama Stadium, Doha
Attendance: 42,127
Referee: Antonio Mateu Lahoz (Spain)

Iran	United States

GK	1	Alireza Beiranvand
RB	23	Ramin Rezaeian
CB	19	Majid Hosseini	(yellow card) 77'
CB	8	Morteza Pouraliganji
LB	5	Milad Mohammadi		(substituted off) 45+2'
RM	17	Ali Gholizadeh		(substituted off) 77'
CM	6	Saeid Ezatolahi
CM	21	Ahmad Nourollahi		(substituted off) 71'
LM	3	Ehsan Hajsafi (c)		(substituted off) 71'
SS	9	Mehdi Taremi
CF	20	Sardar Azmoun		(substituted off) 46'
Substitutions:
MF	18	Ali Karimi		(substituted on) 45+2'
MF	14	Saman Ghoddos		(substituted on) 46'
MF	16	Mehdi Torabi		(substituted on) 71'
DF	25	Abolfazl Jalali	(yellow card) 90+6'	(substituted on) 71'
FW	10	Karim Ansarifard		(substituted on) 77'
Other disciplinary actions:
DF	13	Hossein Kanaanizadegan	(yellow card) 83'
Manager:
(Portugal) Carlos Queiroz

GK	1	Matt Turner
RB	2	Sergiño Dest		(substituted off) 82'
CB	20	Cameron Carter-Vickers
CB	13	Tim Ream
LB	5	Antonee Robinson
DM	4	Tyler Adams (c)	(yellow card) 43'
CM	6	Yunus Musah
CM	8	Weston McKennie		(substituted off) 65'
RF	21	Timothy Weah		(substituted off) 82'
CF	24	Josh Sargent		(substituted off) 77'
LF	10	Christian Pulisic		(substituted off) 46'
Substitutions:
FW	11	Brenden Aaronson		(substituted on) 46'
MF	23	Kellyn Acosta		(substituted on) 65'
FW	19	Haji Wright		(substituted on) 77'
DF	18	Shaq Moore		(substituted on) 82'
DF	3	Walker Zimmerman		(substituted on) 82'
Manager:
Gregg Berhalter

Man of the Match:
Christian Pulisic (United States)

Assistant referees:
Pau Cebrián Devís (Spain)
Roberto Díaz Pérez del Palomar (Spain)
Fourth official:
Kevin Ortega (Peru)
Reserve assistant referee:
Jesús Sánchez (Peru)
Video assistant referee:
Juan Martínez Munuera (Spain)
Assistant video assistant referees:
Ricardo de Burgos Bengoetxea (Spain)
Neuza Back (Brazil)
Alejandro Hernández Hernández (Spain)
Stand-by assistant video assistant referee:
Bruno Pires (Brazil)

== Discipline ==
Fair play points would have been used as tiebreakers if the overall and head-to-head records of teams were tied. These were calculated based on yellow and red cards received in all group matches as follows:

- first yellow card: −1 point;
- indirect red card (second yellow card): −3 points;
- direct red card: −4 points;
- yellow card and direct red card: −5 points;

Only one of the above deductions was applied to a player in a single match.

Team	Match 1				Match 2				Match 3				Points
Team	Yellow card	(yellow card) (yellow-red card)	Red card	(yellow card) (red card)	Yellow card	(yellow card) (yellow-red card)	Red card	(yellow card) (red card)	Yellow card	(yellow card) (yellow-red card)	Red card	(yellow card) (red card)	Points
England													0
United States	4								1				−5
Iran	2				2				3				−7
Wales	2				1		1		2				−9

== See also ==
- England at the FIFA World Cup
- Iran at the FIFA World Cup
- United States at the FIFA World Cup
- Wales at the FIFA World Cup
