= 2022 FIFA World Cup Group E =

Matches in Group E of the 2022 FIFA World Cup took place from 23 November to 1 December 2022. The group consisted of Spain, Costa Rica, Germany, and Japan. The top two teams, Japan and Spain, advanced to the round of 16. Japan became the third ever Asian team to win a World Cup group. Germany was eliminated in the group stage for the second consecutive tournament.

== Teams ==
Draw position	Team	Pot	Confederation	Method of qualification	Date of qualification	Finals appearance	Last appearance	Previous best performance	FIFA Rankings	
Draw position	Team	Pot	Confederation	Method of qualification	Date of qualification	Finals appearance	Last appearance	Previous best performance	March 2022 (Note: The rankings of March 2022 were used for seeding for the final draw.)	October 2022
E1	Spain	1	UEFA	UEFA Group B winners	14 November 2021	16th	2018	Winners (2010)	7	7
E2	Costa Rica	4 (Note: As the identity of the CONCACAF v OFC play-off winners was not known at the time of the final draw, positions in the FIFA Rankings were not taken into account, and the placeholder in the draw was automatically seeded into pot 4.)	CONCACAF	CONCACAF v OFC play-off winners	14 June 2022	6th	2018	Quarter-finals (2014)	31	31
E3	Germany	2	UEFA	UEFA Group J winners	11 October 2021	20th (Note: Germany competed between 1951 and 1990 as West Germany.)	2018	Winners (1954, 1974, 1990, 2014)	12	11
E4	Japan	3	AFC	AFC third round Group B runners-up	24 March 2022	7th	2018	Round of 16 (2002, 2010, 2018)	23	24

== Standings ==
Pos	Team	Pld	W	D	L	GF	GA	GD	Pts	Qualification
1	Japan	3	2	0	1	4	3	+1	6	Advance to knockout stage
2	Spain	3	1	1	1	9	3	+6	4	Advance to knockout stage
3	Germany	3	1	1	1	6	5	+1	4	
4	Costa Rica	3	1	0	2	3	11	−8	3	

Source: FIFA
Rules for classification: Group stage tiebreakers

In the round of 16:

- The winners of Group E, Japan, advanced to play the runners-up of Group F, Croatia.
- The runners-up of Group E, Spain, advanced to play the winners of Group F, Morocco.

== Matches ==
All times listed are local, AST (UTC+3).

=== Germany vs Japan ===
The two teams had faced each other twice, most recently in 2006 friendly, a 2–2 draw.

Japan's Daizen Maeda would convert a cross into the net 8 minutes in, but the goal was ruled out for offside. In the 33rd minute, Germany was awarded a penalty when Japanese goalkeeper Shūichi Gonda fouled David Raum inside the area. İlkay Gündoğan converted the penalty via a shot down the middle of the net, with the goalkeeper diving to the right. Germany would have the ball in the net again just before half-time through Kai Havertz, but the goal was then once again disallowed for offside.

In the 75th minute, Japan equalized through Ritsu Dōan, after he finished a rebound into the net following goalkeeper Manuel Neuer's save from a low shot from the left. Japan went in front eight minutes later, when Takuma Asano received the ball down the right wing before pulling away from defender Nico Schlotterbeck towards the penalty area and shooting high above Neuer into the net past the near post.

The result marked the second consecutive occasion that Germany lost their opening World Cup match, after a 1–0 defeat to Mexico in 2018. Following his substitution on in the 79th minute, the contest also saw the return of Mario Götze in a World Cup match, his first since scoring the decisive goal in extra time of the 2014 final against Argentina.

23 November 2022
16:00

Germany	1–2	Japan
Gündoğan 33' (pen.)		Dōan 75'; Asano 83'

Khalifa International Stadium, Al Rayyan
Attendance: 42,608
Referee: Iván Barton (El Salvador)

Germany	Japan

GK	1	Manuel Neuer (c)
RB	15	Niklas Süle
CB	2	Antonio Rüdiger
CB	23	Nico Schlotterbeck
LB	3	David Raum
CM	6	Joshua Kimmich
CM	21	İlkay Gündoğan	(substituted off) 67'
RW	10	Serge Gnabry	(substituted off) 90'
AM	13	Thomas Müller	(substituted off) 67'
LW	14	Jamal Musiala	(substituted off) 79'
CF	7	Kai Havertz	(substituted off) 79'
Substitutions:
MF	18	Jonas Hofmann	(substituted on) 67'
MF	8	Leon Goretzka	(substituted on) 67'
MF	11	Mario Götze	(substituted on) 79'
FW	9	Niclas Füllkrug	(substituted on) 79'
FW	26	Youssoufa Moukoko	(substituted on) 90'
Manager:
Hansi Flick

GK	12	Shūichi Gonda
RB	19	Hiroki Sakai	(substituted off) 75'
CB	4	Kō Itakura
CB	22	Maya Yoshida (c)
LB	5	Yūto Nagatomo	(substituted off) 57'
CM	6	Wataru Endo
CM	17	Ao Tanaka	(substituted off) 71'
RW	14	Junya Itō
AM	15	Daichi Kamada
LW	11	Takefusa Kubo	(substituted off) 46'
CF	25	Daizen Maeda	(substituted off) 57'
Substitutions:
DF	16	Takehiro Tomiyasu	(substituted on) 46'
MF	9	Kaoru Mitoma	(substituted on) 57'
FW	18	Takuma Asano	(substituted on) 57'
MF	8	Ritsu Dōan	(substituted on) 71'
MF	10	Takumi Minamino	(substituted on) 75'
Manager:
Hajime Moriyasu

Man of the Match:
Shūichi Gonda (Japan)

Assistant referees:
David Morán (El Salvador)
Zachari Zeegelaar (Suriname)
Fourth official:
Saíd Martínez (Honduras)
Reserve assistant referee:
Helpys Raymundo Feliz (Dominican Republic)
Video assistant referee:
Mauro Vigliano (Argentina)
Assistant video assistant referees:
Armando Villarreal (United States)
Kathryn Nesbitt (United States)
Fernando Guerrero (Mexico)
Stand-by assistant video assistant referee:
Mahmoud Abouelregal (Egypt)

=== Spain vs Costa Rica ===
The teams had met on three occasions, all of them friendlies, with the most recent being a 5–0 home win for Spain in 2017.

Spain dominated possession, and were up 3–0 at half-time thanks to goals scored in a span of 20 minutes by Dani Olmo, Marco Asensio and Ferran Torres from the penalty spot. Torres would get his second goal of the match nine minutes into the second half, before teenager Gavi scored Spain's fifth goal via an outside-of-the-foot volley in the 74th minute. Late strikes from substitutes Carlos Soler and Álvaro Morata saw the match conclude in a 7–0 Spanish win, the biggest margin of victory in a World Cup game since Portugal beat North Korea by the same scoreline in 2010. Costa Rica failed to record a single shot throughout the entirety of the contest, whilst Spain scored with each of their first seven shots on target.

Costa Rica equalled their worst ever defeat, a 7–0 loss to Mexico in 1975, while this was Spain's biggest win at a World Cup, surpassing their 6–1 success against Bulgaria in 1998. At the age of 18 years and 110 days, Gavi became the youngest ever player to both play and score in a World Cup match for Spain; he was also the youngest player to score for any team in the competition since Pelé for Brazil in 1958.

23 November 2022
19:00

Spain	7–0	Costa Rica
Olmo 11'; Asensio 21'; F. Torres 31' (pen.), 54'; Gavi 74'; Soler 90'; Morata 90+2'

Al Thumama Stadium, Doha
Attendance: 40,013
Referee: Mohammed Abdulla Hassan Mohamed (United Arab Emirates)

Spain	Costa Rica

GK	23	Unai Simón
RB	2	César Azpilicueta
CB	16	Rodri
CB	24	Aymeric Laporte
LB	18	Jordi Alba	(substituted off) 64'
DM	5	Sergio Busquets (c)	(substituted off) 64'
CM	9	Gavi
CM	26	Pedri	(substituted off) 57'
RF	11	Ferran Torres	(substituted off) 57'
CF	10	Marco Asensio	(substituted off) 69'
LF	21	Dani Olmo
Substitutions:
FW	7	Álvaro Morata	(substituted on) 57'
MF	19	Carlos Soler	(substituted on) 57'
DF	14	Alejandro Balde	(substituted on) 64'
MF	8	Koke	(substituted on) 64'
FW	12	Nico Williams	(substituted on) 69'
Manager:
Luis Enrique

GK	1	Keylor Navas (c)
RB	16	Carlos Martínez		(substituted off) 46'
CB	6	Óscar Duarte
CB	15	Francisco Calvo	(yellow card) 68'
LB	8	Bryan Oviedo		(substituted off) 82'
RM	4	Keysher Fuller
CM	5	Celso Borges		(substituted off) 72'
CM	17	Yeltsin Tejeda
LM	9	Jewison Bennette		(substituted off) 61'
CF	12	Joel Campbell	(yellow card) 90+7'
CF	7	Anthony Contreras		(substituted off) 61'
Substitutions:
DF	19	Kendall Waston		(substituted on) 46'
MF	26	Álvaro Zamora		(substituted on) 61'
MF	10	Bryan Ruiz		(substituted on) 61'
MF	20	Brandon Aguilera		(substituted on) 72'
DF	22	Rónald Matarrita		(substituted on) 82'
Manager:
(Colombia) Luis Fernando Suárez

Man of the Match:
Gavi (Spain)

Assistant referees:
Mohamed Al-Hammadi (United Arab Emirates)
Hasan Al-Mahri (United Arab Emirates)
Fourth official:
Ma Ning (China)
Reserve assistant referee:
Shi Xiang (China)
Video assistant referee:
Abdulla Al-Marri (Qatar)
Assistant video assistant referees:
Muhammad Taqi (Singapore)
Bruno Pires (Brazil)
Tomasz Kwiatkowski (Poland)
Stand-by assistant video assistant referee:
Taleb Al-Marri (Qatar)

=== Japan vs Costa Rica ===
The teams had previously met four times, all in friendly matches, with Japan winning three and drawing one; their most recent encounter was a 3–0 home victory for the Japanese in 2018.

Japan, who made five changes to their starting lineup that won against Germany, dominated the match, but it was Costa Rica who would go in front with nine minutes remaining. Keysher Fuller scored with a shot from the right which was deflected and misjudged by Japan goalkeeper Shūichi Gonda, and this would end up being the only goal of the game.

27 November 2022
13:00

Japan	0–1	Costa Rica
		Fuller 81'

Ahmad bin Ali Stadium, Al Rayyan
Attendance: 41,479
Referee: Michael Oliver (England)

Japan	Costa Rica

GK	12	Shūichi Gonda
RB	2	Miki Yamane	(yellow card) 44'	(substituted off) 62'
CB	4	Kō Itakura	(yellow card) 84'
CB	22	Maya Yoshida (c)
LB	5	Yūto Nagatomo		(substituted off) 46'
CM	6	Wataru Endo	(yellow card) 90+3'
CM	13	Hidemasa Morita
RW	8	Ritsu Dōan		(substituted off) 67'
AM	15	Daichi Kamada
LW	24	Yūki Sōma		(substituted off) 82'
CF	21	Ayase Ueda		(substituted off) 46'
Substitutions:
DF	26	Hiroki Itō		(substituted on) 46'
FW	18	Takuma Asano		(substituted on) 46'
MF	9	Kaoru Mitoma		(substituted on) 62'
MF	14	Junya Itō		(substituted on) 67'
MF	10	Takumi Minamino		(substituted on) 82'
Manager:
Hajime Moriyasu

GK	1	Keylor Navas (c)
CB	6	Óscar Duarte
CB	19	Kendall Waston
CB	15	Francisco Calvo	(yellow card) 70'
RWB	4	Keysher Fuller
LWB	8	Bryan Oviedo
RM	13	Gerson Torres		(substituted off) 65'
CM	5	Celso Borges	(yellow card) 61'	(substituted off) 89'
CM	17	Yeltsin Tejeda
LM	12	Joel Campbell		(substituted off) 90+5'
CF	7	Anthony Contreras	(yellow card) 41'	(substituted off) 65'
Substitutions:
MF	20	Brandon Aguilera		(substituted on) 65'
MF	9	Jewison Bennette		(substituted on) 65'
MF	14	Youstin Salas		(substituted on) 89'
MF	2	Daniel Chacón		(substituted on) 90+5'
Manager:
(Colombia) Luis Fernando Suárez

Man of the Match:
Keysher Fuller (Costa Rica)

Assistant referees:
Stuart Burt (England)
Simon Bennett (England)
Fourth official:
Maguette Ndiaye (Senegal)
Reserve assistant referee:
El Hadj Malick Samba (Senegal)
Video assistant referee:
Jérôme Brisard (France)
Assistant video assistant referees:
Benoît Millot (France)
Cyril Gringore (France)
Adil Zourak (Morocco)
Stand-by assistant video assistant referee:
Nicolas Danos (France)

=== Spain vs Germany ===
The teams had previously met in 26 previous matches including four times in the World Cup: Germany recorded a 2–1 group stage victory in 1966 and a 2–1 second group stage win in 1982, the sides had a 1–1 group stage draw in 1994, and Spain earned a 1–0 semi-final win in 2010. Their most recent meeting was in the 2020–21 UEFA Nations League, with Spain winning 6–0.

In the first half, Spain's Dani Olmo had a shot that goalkeeper Manuel Neuer turned onto the bar. In the 62nd minute, substitute Álvaro Morata put Spain into the lead when he flicked Jordi Alba's cross from the left into the net at the near post. With seven minutes to go, Niclas Füllkrug, also a substitute, equalized for Germany when he lashed the ball with his right foot high past Spanish goalkeeper Unai Simón from the right. Leroy Sané nearly won the contest for Germany in stoppage time when he was through on goal, but the ball eventually went out of bounds after he ran out of space to run.

27 November 2022
22:00

Spain	1–1	Germany
Morata 62'		Füllkrug 83'

Al Bayt Stadium, Al Khor
Attendance: 68,895
Referee: Danny Makkelie (Netherlands)

Spain	Germany

GK	23	Unai Simón
RB	20	Dani Carvajal
CB	16	Rodri
CB	24	Aymeric Laporte
LB	18	Jordi Alba		(substituted off) 82'
DM	5	Sergio Busquets (c)	(yellow card) 44'
CM	9	Gavi		(substituted off) 66'
CM	26	Pedri
RF	11	Ferran Torres		(substituted off) 54'
CF	10	Marco Asensio		(substituted off) 66'
LF	21	Dani Olmo
Substitutions:
FW	7	Álvaro Morata		(substituted on) 54'
MF	8	Koke		(substituted on) 66'
FW	12	Nico Williams		(substituted on) 66'
DF	14	Alejandro Balde		(substituted on) 82'
Manager:
Luis Enrique

GK	1	Manuel Neuer (c)
RB	5	Thilo Kehrer	(yellow card) 37'	(substituted off) 70'
CB	15	Niklas Süle
CB	2	Antonio Rüdiger
LB	3	David Raum		(substituted off) 87'
CM	6	Joshua Kimmich	(yellow card) 60'
CM	8	Leon Goretzka	(yellow card) 58'
RW	10	Serge Gnabry		(substituted off) 85'
AM	21	İlkay Gündoğan		(substituted off) 70'
LW	14	Jamal Musiala
CF	13	Thomas Müller		(substituted off) 70'
Substitutions:
FW	9	Niclas Füllkrug		(substituted on) 70'
DF	16	Lukas Klostermann		(substituted on) 70'
MF	19	Leroy Sané		(substituted on) 70'
MF	18	Jonas Hofmann		(substituted on) 85'
DF	23	Nico Schlotterbeck		(substituted on) 87'
Manager:
Hansi Flick

Man of the Match:
Álvaro Morata (Spain)

Assistant referees:
Hessel Steegstra (Netherlands)
Jan de Vries (Netherlands)
Fourth official:
István Kovács (Romania)
Reserve assistant referee:
Vasile Marinescu (Romania)
Video assistant referee:
Pol van Boekel (Netherlands)
Assistant video assistant referees:
Massimiliano Irrati (Italy)
Taleb Al-Marri (Qatar)
Paolo Valeri (Italy)
Stand-by assistant video assistant referee:
Ovidiu Artene (Romania)

=== Japan vs Spain ===
The teams previously faced each other once in 2001, a friendly won 1–0 by Spain.

After Álvaro Morata scored with a header from five yards out after a cross from César Azpilicueta on the right to give Spain a 1–0 half-time lead, Ritsu Dōan equalized for Japan early into the second period, with his strike from outside the penalty area overpowering goalkeeper Unai Simón and going into the top right corner of the net. Ao Tanaka put Japan in front just three minutes later with a close range finish, with the assist coming from a cut-back by Kaoru Mitoma on the left, with the ball within millimeters of the goalline. This proved to be the decisive goal, as Japan won 2–1 to top Group E ahead of Spain and Germany, the latter being eliminated.

Due to the tightness of the call, Japan's second goal sparked much discussion. The live television camera angle created an optical illusion as if the pass to Tanaka was out of bounds, and the video assistant referee took several minutes to confirm that a sliver of the ball stayed in the field, making it a valid goal. The crucial evidence that settled the dispute was the bird's eye photo taken by Petr David Josek, released by the Associated Press.

Japan's victory with only 18% of possession was the lowest for a winning side at a World Cup match since records began in 1966.

1 December 2022
22:00

Japan	2–1	Spain
Dōan 48'; Tanaka 51'		Morata 11'

Khalifa International Stadium, Al Rayyan
Attendance: 44,851
Referee: Victor Gomes (South Africa)

Japan	Spain

GK	12	Shūichi Gonda
CB	4	Kō Itakura	(yellow card) 39'
CB	22	Maya Yoshida (c)	(yellow card) 45'
CB	3	Shōgo Taniguchi	(yellow card) 44'
RM	14	Junya Itō
CM	13	Hidemasa Morita
CM	17	Ao Tanaka		(substituted off) 87'
LM	5	Yūto Nagatomo		(substituted off) 46'
RF	15	Daichi Kamada		(substituted off) 69'
CF	25	Daizen Maeda		(substituted off) 62'
LF	11	Takefusa Kubo		(substituted off) 46'
Substitutions:
MF	8	Ritsu Dōan		(substituted on) 46'
MF	9	Kaoru Mitoma		(substituted on) 46'
FW	18	Takuma Asano		(substituted on) 62'
DF	16	Takehiro Tomiyasu		(substituted on) 69'
MF	6	Wataru Endo		(substituted on) 87'
Manager:
Hajime Moriyasu

GK	23	Unai Simón
RB	2	César Azpilicueta	(substituted off) 46'
CB	16	Rodri
CB	4	Pau Torres
LB	14	Alejandro Balde	(substituted off) 68'
DM	5	Sergio Busquets (c)
CM	9	Gavi	(substituted off) 68'
CM	26	Pedri
RF	12	Nico Williams	(substituted off) 57'
CF	7	Álvaro Morata	(substituted off) 57'
LF	21	Dani Olmo
Substitutions:
DF	20	Dani Carvajal	(substituted on) 46'
FW	11	Ferran Torres	(substituted on) 57'
FW	10	Marco Asensio	(substituted on) 57'
FW	25	Ansu Fati	(substituted on) 68'
DF	18	Jordi Alba	(substituted on) 68'
Manager:
Luis Enrique

Man of the Match:
Ao Tanaka (Japan)

Assistant referees:
Zakhele Siwela (South Africa)
Souru Phatsoane (Lesotho)
Fourth official:
Salima Mukansanga (Rwanda)
Reserve assistant referee:
El Hadj Malick Samba (Senegal)
Video assistant referee:
Fernando Guerrero (Mexico)
Assistant video assistant referees:
Armando Villarreal (United States)
Kyle Atkins (United States)
Adil Zourak (Morocco)
Stand-by assistant video assistant referee:
Nicolás Taran (Uruguay)

=== Costa Rica vs Germany ===
The teams had only met once prior, when hosts Germany defeated Costa Rica 4–2 in the opening match of the 2006 FIFA World Cup.

After taking the lead in the first half through Serge Gnabry, Germany would be pegged pack in the second period following goals from Costa Rica scored by Yeltsin Tejeda and Juan Pablo Vargas. Germany would quickly rally back with a brace from Kai Havertz and a late effort converted by Niclas Füllkrug to win the match 4–2, the same scoreline as the teams' previous World Cup encounter.

Despite the victory, Germany were still edged out of second place in the group by Spain, as a result of Spain's superior goal difference, and failed to reach the knockout stage. Costa Rica exited the competition as the team with the worst goal difference, although they won one of their three matches.

1 December 2022
22:00

Costa Rica	2–4	Germany
Tejeda 58'; Vargas 70'		Gnabry 10'; Havertz 73', 85'; Füllkrug 89'

Al Bayt Stadium, Al Khor
Attendance: 67,054
Referee: Stéphanie Frappart (France)

Costa Rica	Germany

GK	1	Keylor Navas (c)
CB	19	Kendall Waston
CB	6	Óscar Duarte	(yellow card) 77'
CB	3	Juan Pablo Vargas
RWB	4	Keysher Fuller		(substituted off) 74'
LWB	8	Bryan Oviedo		(substituted off) 90+3'
RM	12	Joel Campbell
CM	5	Celso Borges
CM	17	Yeltsin Tejeda		(substituted off) 90+3'
LM	20	Brandon Aguilera		(substituted off) 46'
CF	11	Johan Venegas		(substituted off) 74'
Substitutions:
MF	14	Youstin Salas		(substituted on) 46'
DF	22	Rónald Matarrita		(substituted on) 74'
MF	9	Jewison Bennette		(substituted on) 74'
FW	7	Anthony Contreras		(substituted on) 90+3'
MF	24	Roan Wilson		(substituted on) 90+3'
Manager:
(Colombia) Luis Fernando Suárez

GK	1	Manuel Neuer (c)
RB	6	Joshua Kimmich
CB	15	Niklas Süle	(substituted off) 90+3'
CB	2	Antonio Rüdiger
LB	3	David Raum	(substituted off) 66'
CM	8	Leon Goretzka	(substituted off) 46'
CM	21	İlkay Gündoğan	(substituted off) 55'
RW	19	Leroy Sané
AM	14	Jamal Musiala
LW	10	Serge Gnabry
CF	13	Thomas Müller	(substituted off) 66'
Substitutions:
DF	16	Lukas Klostermann	(substituted on) 46'
FW	9	Niclas Füllkrug	(substituted on) 55'
FW	7	Kai Havertz	(substituted on) 66'
MF	11	Mario Götze	(substituted on) 66'
DF	4	Matthias Ginter	(substituted on) 90+3'
Manager:
Hansi Flick

Man of the Match:
Kai Havertz (Germany)

Assistant referees:
Neuza Back (Brazil)
Karen Díaz Medina (Mexico)
Fourth official:
Saíd Martínez (Honduras)
Reserve assistant referee:
Walter López (Honduras)
Video assistant referee:
Drew Fischer (Canada)
Assistant video assistant referees:
Jérôme Brisard (France)
Kathryn Nesbitt (United States)
Massimiliano Irrati (Italy)
Stand-by assistant video assistant referee:
Corey Parker (United States)

== Discipline ==
Fair play points would have been used as tiebreakers if the overall and head-to-head records of teams were tied. These were calculated based on yellow and red cards received in all group matches as follows:

- first yellow card: −1 point;
- indirect red card (second yellow card): −3 points;
- direct red card: −4 points;
- yellow card and direct red card: −5 points;

Only one of the above deductions was applied to a player in a single match.

Team	Match 1				Match 2				Match 3				Points
Team	Booked	(yellow card) (yellow-red card)	Sent off (straight red)	(yellow card) (red card)	Booked	(yellow card) (yellow-red card)	Sent off (straight red)	(yellow card) (red card)	Booked	(yellow card) (yellow-red card)	Sent off (straight red)	(yellow card) (red card)	Points
Spain					1								−1
Germany					3								−3
Costa Rica	2				3				1				−6
Japan					3				3				−6

== See also ==
- Costa Rica at the FIFA World Cup
- Germany at the FIFA World Cup
- Japan at the FIFA World Cup
- Spain at the FIFA World Cup
