= 2026 FIFA World Cup draw =

Calculation of football teams before tournament

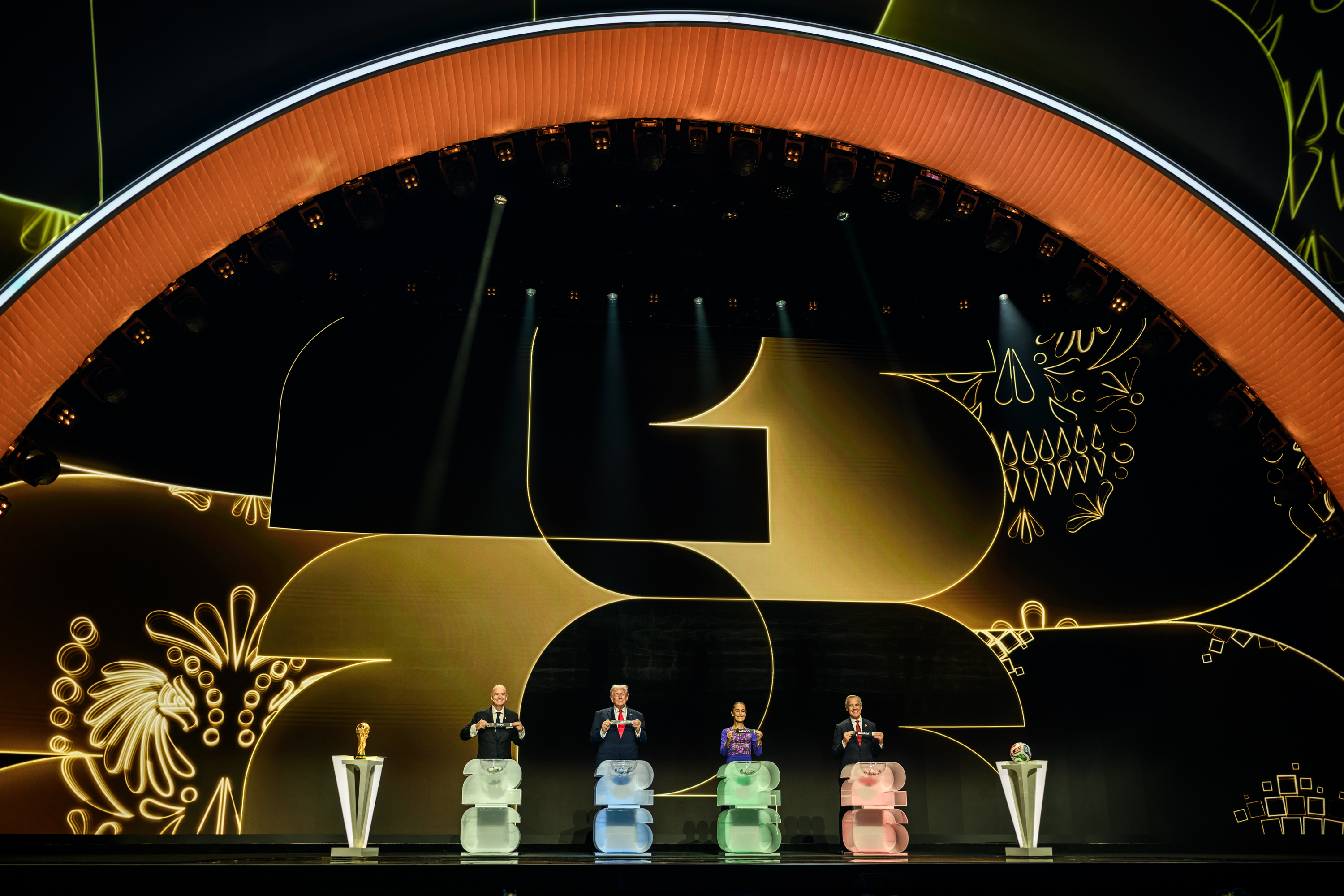
World Cup draw on December 5, 2025

The draw for the 2026 FIFA World Cup was held at 12:00 UTC−5 (EST) on December 5, 2025, at the John F. Kennedy Center for the Performing Arts in Washington, D.C., United States. It set the stage for the round-robin group stage in the United States, Mexico, and Canada, where the World Cup was played. The teams were divided into four pots of twelve, with one team selected from each pot to form a group.

As hosts, Mexico, Canada and the United States were seeded. They took positions A1, B1, and D1, respectively, from Pot 1, where they were joined by the top nine qualified teams in the FIFA rankings. The countries occupying positions 13 to 24 on the ranking of the qualified teams were allocated to Pot 2, while the 25th to 36th best-ranked qualifiers were placed in Pot 3. Finally, Pot 4 included the qualified teams in positions 37 to 42, plus six placeholders – two for the winners of the inter-confederation playoffs, and four for the winners of the European playoffs. The final six teams to qualify were determined in these playoffs played on March 26 and 31, 2026, during the FIFA International Match Calendar.

== Ceremony ==
The draw ceremony was hosted by Kevin Hart, Heidi Klum, and Danny Ramirez. The ceremony also featured live performances from Andrea Bocelli, Lauryn Hill, Nicole Scherzinger, and Robbie Williams. In addition, Village People performed their song "Y.M.C.A." following the conclusion of the draw. The draw itself was conducted by Rio Ferdinand, with Samantha Johnson as co-conductor and Eli Manning as the red carpet host. Tom Brady, Wayne Gretzky, Aaron Judge, and Shaquille O'Neal acted as draw assistants.

The draw was attended by the coaches and representatives from 64 teams — the 42 qualified teams and the 22 teams participating in either the inter-confederation or the European playoffs. Also in attendance were Canadian prime minister Mark Carney, Mexican president Claudia Sheinbaum, and American president Donald Trump.

Iran had initially announced that it would boycott the ceremony after Mehdi Taj, the president of the Football Federation Islamic Republic of Iran (FFIRI), was denied a visa to enter the United States. However, the FFIRI later stated that it had reversed its decision, and would be sending representatives led by coach Amir Ghalenoei.

Prior to the draw, FIFA head Gianni Infantino presented the FIFA Peace Prize to U.S. President Donald Trump. FIFA stated that the award recognized his "involvement in ceasefire efforts and diplomatic engagements in several conflicts". The creation of the prize and the choice of Trump as its first recipient generated widespread ridicule, scrutiny, and controversy. Human rights groups, analysts, and soccer stakeholders questioned the transparency of the selection process, the suitability of the inaugural laureate, and the implications both for FIFA's claims of political neutrality and its human rights commitments.

== Seeding ==
The 42 known teams were seeded based on the FIFA Men's World Ranking of November 19, 2025 (shown in parentheses). The six unknown placeholders representing the playoff winners were automatically placed in Pot 4.

Pots
Pot 1	Pot 2	Pot 3	Pot 4
1. United States (co-host) (14); 2. Mexico (co-host) (15); 3. Canada (co-host) (27); 4. Spain (1); 5. Argentina (2); 6. France (3); 7. England (4); 8. Brazil (5); 9. Portugal (6); 10. Netherlands (7); 11. Belgium (8); 12. Germany (9)	13. Croatia (10); 14. Morocco (11); 15. Colombia (13); 16. Uruguay (16); 17. Switzerland (17); 18. Japan (18); 19. Senegal (19); 20. Iran (20); 21. South Korea (22); 22. Ecuador (23); 23. Austria (24); 24. Australia (26)	25. Norway (29); 26. Panama (30); 27. Egypt (34); 28. Algeria (35); 29. Scotland (36); 30. Paraguay (39); 31. Tunisia (40); 32. Ivory Coast (42); 33. Uzbekistan (50); 34. Qatar (51); 35. Saudi Arabia (60); 36. South Africa (61)	37. Jordan (66); 38. Cape Verde (68); 39. Ghana (72); 40. Curaçao (82); 41. Haiti (84); 42. New Zealand (86); 43. UEFA Path A winner (Note: The winners of the UEFA playoffs and inter-confederation playoffs were not known at the time of the draw, as those matches were held on 26 and 31 March 2026.); 44. UEFA Path B winner 45. UEFA Path C winner 46. UEFA Path D winner 47. IC Path 1 winner (Note: The placeholder for the inter-confederation playoff Pathway 1 winner adhered to the confederation restrictions of a CAF, CONCACAF, or OFC team.); 48. IC Path 2 winner (Note: The placeholder for the inter-confederation playoff Pathway 2 winner adhered to the confederation restrictions of an AFC, CONCACAF, or CONMEBOL team.)

== Draw constraints and procedure ==
Two teams from the same confederation could not be placed in the same group, with the exception of UEFA for which there had to be at least one but no more than two teams in each group. The confederation restriction applied to all three potential winners of the inter-confederation playoffs. FIFA also announced that, "in the interest of ensuring competitive balance," the teams ranked first (Spain), second (Argentina), third (France), and fourth (England) would be drawn into different pathways. Therefore, should these teams win their groups, which they ultimately did, they would be unable to meet until the semifinals, and the first and second ranked teams would be unable to meet until the final.

Despite the procedure stating that the three co-hosts would be identified by different colored balls and placed in pre-defined positions as per the match schedule, the draw for the co-hosts was instead performed by their respective heads of government, who drew their own nations out. The draw then started with the remaining nine teams in Pot 1, which were identified by nine balls of the same color and allocated to position 1 of the group into which they were drawn. For pots 2, 3 and 4, each team's group position was determined according to a predefined allocation pattern, which was published by FIFA as a part of the draw procedures as follows:

- Groups A, D, G, J
  - Position 2: Team from Pot 3
  - Position 3: Team from Pot 2
  - Position 4: Team from Pot 4
- Groups B, E, H, K
  - Position 2: Team from Pot 4
  - Position 3: Team from Pot 3
  - Position 4: Team from Pot 2
- Groups C, F, I, L
  - Position 2: Team from Pot 2
  - Position 3: Team from Pot 4
  - Position 4: Team from Pot 3

== Final draw ==
The twelve groups were formed randomly, selecting one team from each of the four pots. The three hosts' positions in the draw was predetermined – Mexico in A1, Canada in B1, and the United States in D1. Unlike previous editions, the position of unseeded teams in each group was also predetermined as opposed to being randomly drawn.

Group A
Pos	Team
A1	Mexico
A2	South Africa
A3	South Korea
A4	Czech Republic (Note: UEFA Path D winners)

Group B
Pos	Team
B1	Canada
B2	Bosnia and Herzegovina (Note: UEFA Path A winners)
B3	Qatar
B4	Switzerland

Group C
Pos	Team
C1	Brazil
C2	Morocco
C3	Haiti
C4	Scotland

Group D
Pos	Team
D1	United States
D2	Paraguay
D3	Australia
D4	Turkey (Note: UEFA Path C winners)

Group E
Pos	Team
E1	Germany
E2	Curaçao
E3	Ivory Coast
E4	Ecuador

Group F
Pos	Team
F1	Netherlands
F2	Japan
F3	Sweden (Note: UEFA Path B winners)
F4	Tunisia

Group G
Pos	Team
G1	Belgium
G2	Egypt
G3	Iran
G4	New Zealand

Group H
Pos	Team
H1	Spain
H2	Cape Verde
H3	Saudi Arabia
H4	Uruguay

Group I
Pos	Team
I1	France
I2	Senegal
I3	Iraq (Note: IC Path 2 winners)
I4	Norway

Group J
Pos	Team
J1	Argentina
J2	Algeria
J3	Austria
J4	Jordan

Group K
Pos	Team
K1	Portugal
K2	DR Congo (Note: IC Path 1 winners)
K3	Uzbekistan
K4	Colombia

Group L
Pos	Team
L1	England
L2	Croatia
L3	Ghana
L4	Panama

== See also ==
- 2022 FIFA World Cup seeding
