= Jewison Bennette =

Costa Rican footballer (born 2004)

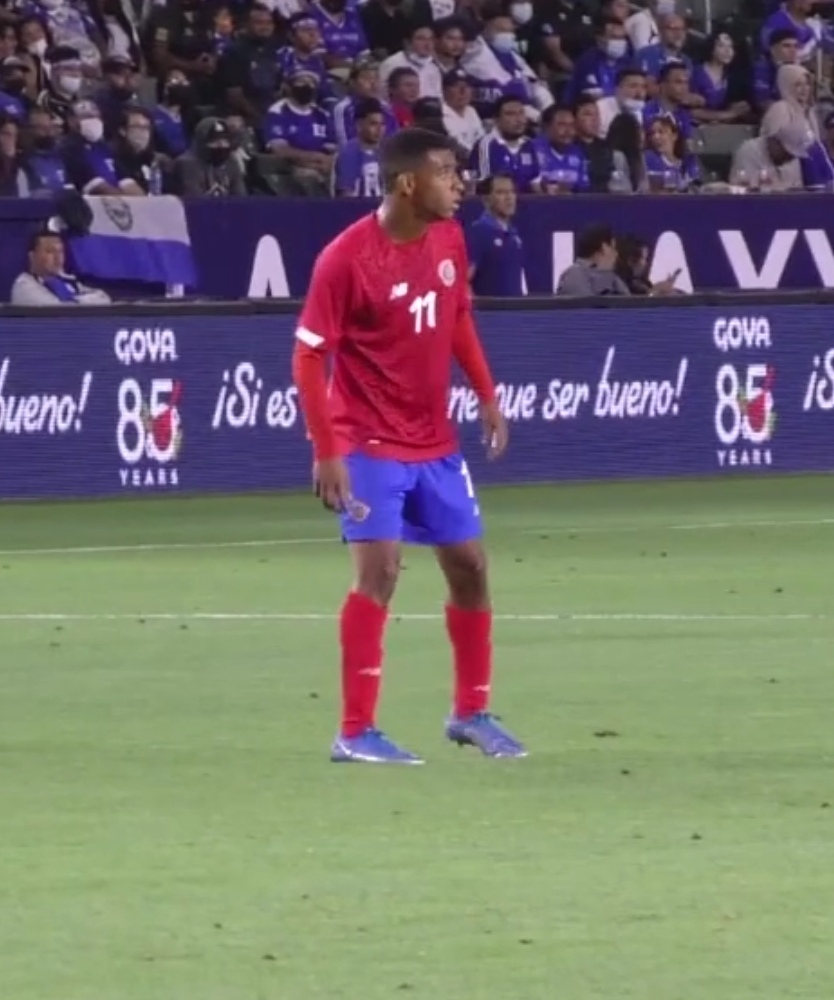
- Bennette during his debut match with Costa Rica

Personal information
- Full name: Jewison Francisco Bennette Villegas
- Date of birth: 15 June 2004 (age 22)
- Place of birth: Heredia, Costa Rica
- Height: 1.73 m (5 ft 8 in)
- Position: Winger

Team information
- Current team: Győr (on loan from LNZ Cherkasy)
- Number: 19

Youth career
- –2021: Herediano

Senior career*
| Years | Team | Apps | (Gls) |
| 2021–2022 | Herediano | 35 | (3) |
| 2022–2025 | Sunderland | 16 | (1) |
| 2024 | → Aris Thessaloniki (loan) | 2 | (0) |
| 2025– | LNZ Cherkasy | 16 | (0) |
| 2026– | → Győr (loan) | 4 | (0) |

International career^{‡}
| 2019 | Costa Rica U15 | 1 | (0) |
| 2022– | Costa Rica U20 | 3 | (0) |
| 2023– | Costa Rica U23 | 2 | (0) |
| 2021– | Costa Rica | 16 | (2) |
- * Club domestic league appearances and goals as of 7 September 2026 ‡ National team caps and goals as of 19:21, 31 March 2026 (UTC)

Jewison Francisco Bennette Villegas (born 15 June 2004) is a Costa Rican professional footballer who plays as a left winger for Győr on loan from LNZ Cherkasy and the Costa Rica national team.

== Club career ==
=== Early career ===
Born in Heredia, Bennette started his career at Herediano. He made his senior debut on 1 August 2021 in a 3–2 defeat to Jicaral, and scored the first goal of the match after four minutes.

=== Sunderland ===
In August 2022, EFL Championship side Sunderland announced they had signed Bennette to a four-year deal. He made his debut for his new club on 14 September, replacing Corry Evans as a substitute against Reading. In his second match for Sunderland against Watford, he scored his first goal.

On 30 January 2024, Bennette joined Super League Greece club Aris Thessaloniki on loan for the remainder of the season.

=== LNZ Cherkasy ===
On 9 March 2025, Bennette signed for Ukrainian Premier League side LNZ Cherkasy for an undisclosed fee.

== International career ==
Bennette played for the Costa Rica under-15 team in 2019. He trained with the Costa Rica national team in summer 2021 ahead of the 2021 CONCACAF Gold Cup, and made his senior international debut for Costa Rica in a 0–0 draw against El Salvador on 21 August 2021, believing in the sports environment as the youngest player to represent Costa Rica internationally, at 17 years and 2 months.

Some time later it is demonstrated that he is not the youngest player to debut with the senior national team, since in 1938 the forward José Luis "Chime" Rojas debuted against El Salvador for the Central American and Caribbean Games in Panama City (score 7–0), and on that day this Costa Rican forward was 16 years, 8 months and 25 days old.

Bennette played in Costa Rica's 2022 World Cup qualification fixtures against Canada and Honduras in November 2021, becoming Costa Rica's youngest player to feature in World Cup qualifying. Bennette became crucial for the team, as he assisted Joel Campbell to score the lone goal at the play-off match against New Zealand to seal Costa Rica's spot at the 2022 FIFA World Cup. On 23 September, he scored his first two international goals in a friendly against South Korea.

On 3 November 2022, Bennette was named in Costa Rica's 26 player squad for the 2022 FIFA World Cup. Bennette started in Costa Rica's opening 7–0 defeat against Spain, and came off the substitutes bench in their 1–0 victory over Japan as well as their 4–2 defeat over Germany as Costa Rica finished fourth in Group E.

== Personal life ==
His father, Jewisson Bennette, also played as a footballer for Herediano and the Costa Rica national team, as did his uncle Try Bennett. He is the older brother of twins Nick and Mike.

== Career statistics ==
=== Club ===
As of match played 21 March 2026

Appearances and goals by club, season and competition
| Club | Season | League | | | National cup (Note: Includes FA Cup) | | League cup (Note: Includes EFL Cup) | | Other | | Total | |
| Club | Season | Division | Apps | Goals | Apps | Goals | Apps | Goals | Apps | Goals | Apps | Goals |
|---|---|---|---|---|---|---|---|---|---|---|---|---|
| Herediano | 2021–22 | Liga FPD | 31 | 1 | 0 | 0 | – | | 0 | 0 | 31 | 1 |
| Herediano | 2022–23 | Liga FPD | 4 | 2 | 0 | 0 | – | | 1 (Note: Appearance in the Supercopa de Costa Rica.) | 0 | 5 | 2 |
| Herediano | Total | | 35 | 3 | 0 | 0 | 0 | 0 | 1 | 0 | 36 | 3 |
| Sunderland | 2022–23 | Championship | 15 | 1 | 3 | 1 | 0 | 0 | 0 | 0 | 18 | 2 |
| Sunderland | 2023–24 | Championship | 1 | 0 | 0 | 0 | 1 | 0 | 0 | 0 | 2 | 0 |
| Sunderland | 2024–25 | Championship | 0 | 0 | 0 | 0 | 1 | 0 | 0 | 0 | 1 | 0 |
| Sunderland | Total | | 16 | 1 | 3 | 1 | 2 | 0 | 0 | 0 | 21 | 2 |
| Aris Thessaloniki (loan) | 2023–24 | Super League Greece | 2 | 0 | — | | — | | — | | 2 | 0 |
| LNZ Cherkasy | 2024–25 | Ukrainian Premier League | 2 | 0 | 0 | 0 | — | | — | | 2 | 0 |
| LNZ Cherkasy | 2025–26 | Ukrainian Premier League | 11 | 0 | 2 | 0 | — | | — | | 13 | 0 |
| LNZ Cherkasy | Total | | 13 | 0 | 2 | 0 | — | | — | | 15 | 0 |
| Career total | | | 66 | 4 | 5 | 1 | 2 | 0 | 1 | 0 | 74 | 5 |

=== International ===
As of match played 31 March 2026

Appearances and goals by national team and year
| National team | Year | Apps | Goals |
|---|---|---|---|
| Costa Rica | 2021 | 3 | 0 |
| Costa Rica | 2022 | 7 | 2 |
| Costa Rica | 2023 | 5 | 0 |
| Costa Rica | 2026 | 1 | 0 |
| Total | | 16 | 2 |

=== International goals ===
List of international goals scored by Jewison Bennette
| No. | Date | Venue | Opponent | Score | Result | Competition |
|---|---|---|---|---|---|---|
| 1 | 23 September 2022 | Goyang Stadium, Goyang, South Korea | South Korea | 1–1 | 2–2 | Friendly |
| 2 | 23 September 2022 | Goyang Stadium, Goyang, South Korea | South Korea | 2–1 | 2–2 | Friendly |

== Honours ==
Herediano

- Liga FPD: 2021–22
- Supercopa de Costa Rica: 2022
