= Sport-Informations-Dienst =

- Industry: News media
- Founded: September 15, 1945
- Headquarters: Cologne, Germany
- Products: News agency
- Website: www.sid.de

Sport-Informations-Dienst GmbH (SID) (Sport Information Service) is a German news agency. Based in Cologne, it has grown to be a major sport news agency. It was founded on 15 September 1945. In 1998, it became a subsidiary of Agence France-Presse.
