= Yeltsin Tejeda =

Costa Rican footballer (born 1992)

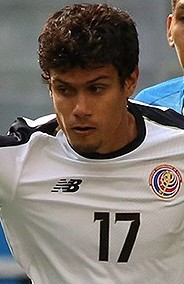
- Tejeda with Costa Rica at the 2018 FIFA World Cup

Personal information
- Full name: Yeltsin Ignacio Tejeda Valverde
- Date of birth: 17 March 1992 (age 34)
- Place of birth: Limón, Costa Rica
- Height: 1.79 m (5 ft 10 in)
- Position: Defensive midfielder

Team information
- Current team: Puntarenas
- Number: 5

Youth career
- Saprissa

Senior career*
Years	Team	Apps	(Gls)
2011–2014	Saprissa	110	(5)
2014–2016	Evian	53	(1)
2016–2018	Lausanne-Sport	28	(1)
2019–2026	Herediano	189	(10)
2026–	Puntarenas	0	(0)

International career^{‡}
2008–2009	Costa Rica U17	9	(0)
2010–2011	Costa Rica U20	13	(0)
2011–	Costa Rica	78	(1)
- * Club domestic league appearances and goals as of 25 May 2021 ‡ National team caps and goals as of 03:22, 29 March 2023 (UTC)

Yeltsin Ignacio Tejeda Valverde (Spanish pronunciation: [ˈʝeltsin teˈxeða]; born 17 March 1992) is a Costa Rican professional footballer who plays as a defensive midfielder for Liga FPD club Puntarenas, which he captains, and the Costa Rica national team.

He is named after the first President of Russia Boris Yeltsin.

== Club career ==
=== Saprissa ===
Tejeda began his career with Saprissa in 2011 scoring one goal against San Carlos. In the 2014 Verano season, Tejeda was named the captain of the team.

=== Evian ===
After Costa Rica's campaign at the 2014 FIFA World Cup, Tejeda traveled to the United Kingdom to sign with Swansea City, but the club halted the negotiations, and Tejeda instead traveled to France. On 22 August 2014, then-Ligue 1 club Evian announced that Tejeda had signed a four-year contract. He scored his first goal for the club on 19 September 2014 in a 2–1 loss to Bordeaux. During the winter transfer window, Tejeda was joined by his countryman and former Saprissa teammate David Ramírez. The team was relegated to Ligue 2 at the end of the season.

=== Lausanne-Sport ===
In July 2016 Tejeda joined Swiss club Lausanne-Sport on a three-year contract.

=== Herediano ===
In January 2019 Tejeda returned to Costa Rica, signing with Herediano. He signed a two-year contract extension with the club in October 2021.

== International career ==
Tejeda was selected in Costa Rica's squad for the 2009 CONCACAF U-17 Championship and he was named in the 2011 CONCACAF U-20 Championship. He played for his country at the 2009 FIFA U-17 and 2011 FIFA U-20 World Cups.

He officially debuted in the senior Costa Rica national football team on 11 December 2011 in a friendly match against Cuba, in Havana and has, as of November 2014, earned a total of 30 caps, scoring no goals. Tejeda was a key part during Costa Rica's successful qualification to the 2014 FIFA World Cup and during the finals tournament. He also played at the 2013 Copa Centroamericana and 2013 CONCACAF Gold Cup.

In May 2018 he was named in Costa Rica's 23 man squad for the 2018 FIFA World Cup in Russia.

In November 2022, Tejeda was named to Costa Rica's 26-man squad for the 2022 FIFA World Cup. On 1 December in Costa Rica's final group stage game, he scored his first goal for Costa Rica against Germany in a 4–2 defeat.

== Career statistics ==
=== International ===
As of match played 28 March 2023

Costa Rica
Year	Apps	Goals
2011	2	0
2012	6	0
2013	10	0
2014	12	0
2015	4	0
2016	5	0
2017	7	0
2018	6	0
2019	0	0
2020	3	0
2021	10	0
2022	11	1
2023	2	0
Total	78	1

As of match played 1 December 2022
Costa Rica score listed first, score column indicates score after each Tejeda goal.

List of international goals scored by Yeltsin Tejeda
No.	Date	Venue	Cap	Opponent	Score	Result	Competition	Ref.
1	1 December 2022	Al Bayt Stadium, Al Khor, Qatar	76	Germany	1–1	2–4	2022 FIFA World Cup	
