= Keysher Fuller =

Costa Rican football player (born 1994)

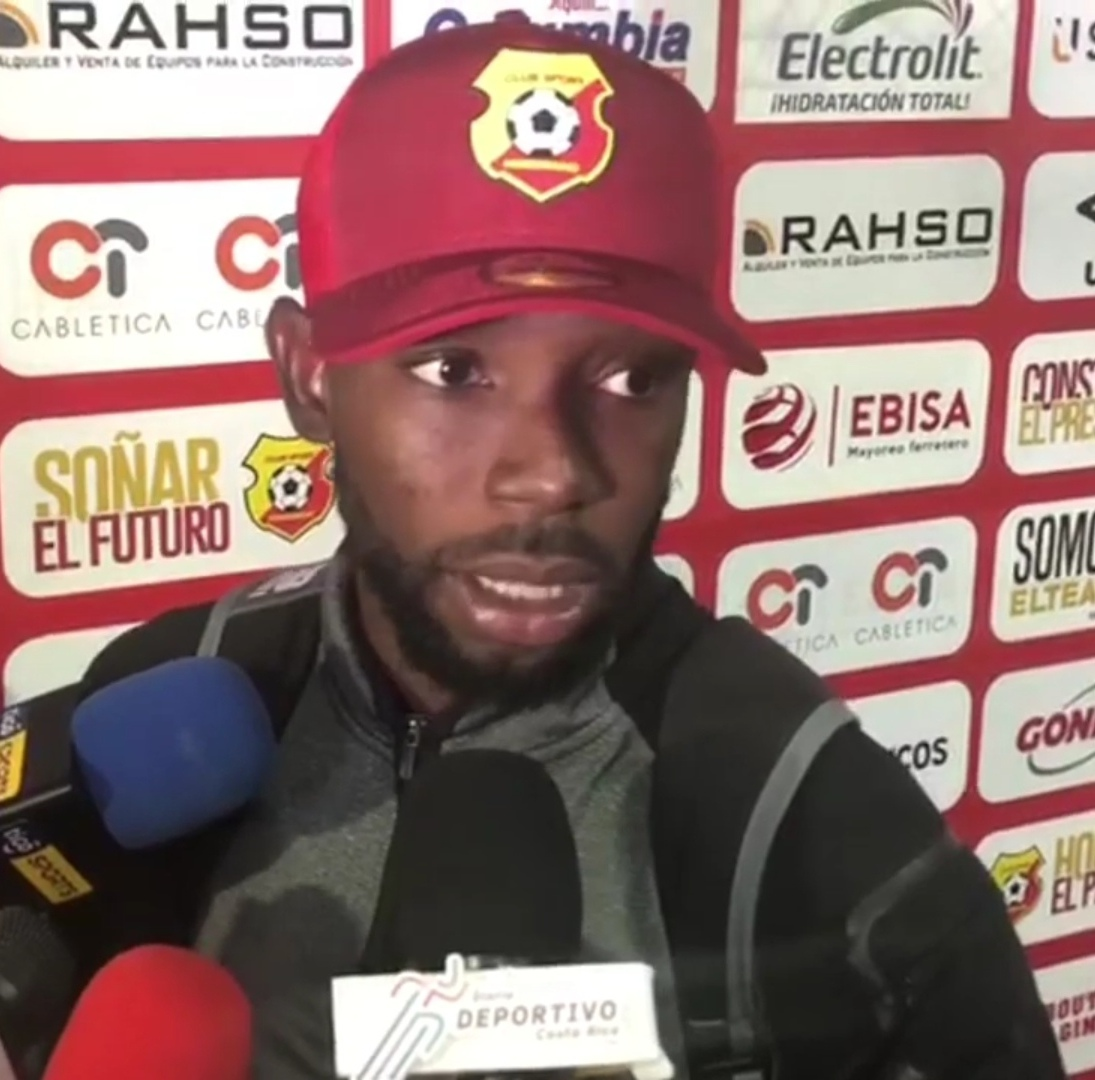
- Fuller in 2020

Personal information
- Full name: Keysher Fuller Spence
- Date of birth: 12 July 1994 (age 32)
- Place of birth: Limón, Costa Rica
- Height: 1.83 m (6 ft 0 in)
- Position: Right-back

Team information
- Current team: Herediano
- Number: 7

Senior career*
Years	Team	Apps	(Gls)
2013–2016	Generación Saprissa Tibas		
2016–2017	Uruguay de Coronado		
2017–2018	Municipal Grecia	38	(4)
2018–2024	Herediano	181	(1)
2024-2025	Cartaginés	7	(0)
2025	Municipal Liberia	12	(1)
2025-	Herediano	20	(2)

International career^{‡}
2019–	Costa Rica	37	(3)
- * Club domestic league appearances and goals as of 12:41, 27 May 2026 (UTC) ‡ National team caps and goals as of 14:00, 8 July 2023 (UTC)

Keysher Fuller Spence (born 12 July 1994) is a Costa Rican professional footballer who plays as a right-back for Liga FPD club Herediano and the Costa Rica national team.

Fuller made his debut for the senior Costa Rica national team at Avaya Stadium on 2 February 2019 against the United States.

== Club career ==
From Limón, Fuller was in the Deportivo Saprissa youth academy. Fuller made his debut in the Second Division reserve team in January 2012. In 2016 he went to C.S. Uruguay de Coronado and a season later to Municipal Grecia where he become one a first team regular during the 2017–18 season. His form for Municipal Grecia led to C.S. Herediano acquiring his services in March 2018. In his first season with Herediano he won the CONCACAF League.

In August 2024, he signed for C.S. Cartaginés. Having also played for Municipal Liberia, Fuller signed for Club Sport Herediano ahead of the 2026 season.

== International career ==
Born in Costa Rica, Fuller is of Jamaican descent. He made his senior debut for Costa Rica in a friendly against the United States on February 2, 2019. The next month on March 27 he scored his first international goal in a 1–0 win over Jamaica. Fuller also represented Costa Rica at the 2021 CONCACAF Gold Cup.

In November 2022, Fuller was named to the Costa Rican squad for the 2022 FIFA World Cup. In Costa Rica's second group stage match on November 27, he scored the only goal of the game in a 1–0 victory over Japan.

=== International goals ===
List of international goals scored by Keysher Fuller
No.	Date	Venue	Opponent	Score	Result	Competition
1	27 March 2019	Estadio Nacional de Costa Rica, San José, Costa Rica	Jamaica	1–0	1–0	Friendly
2	13 October 2021	Lower.com Field, Columbus, United States	United States	1–0	1–2	2022 FIFA World Cup qualification
3	27 November 2022	Ahmed bin Ali Stadium, Al-Rayyan, Qatar	Japan	1–0	1–0	2022 FIFA World Cup

== Honours ==
Herediano

- Liga FPD: Apertura 2018, Apertura 2019
- CONCACAF League: 2018
