= 2022 FIFA World Cup seeding =

Calculation of football teams before tournament

The draw for the 2022 FIFA World Cup took place on 1 April 2022 at the Exhibition and Convention Center in Doha, Qatar. It set the stage for the round-robin group stage in Qatar, where the World Cup was played. The teams were divided into four pots of eight, with one team selected from each pot to form a group.

As hosts, Qatar took position A1 from Pot 1, where they were joined by the FIFA Ranking's seven highest-ranked qualified teams. The countries occupying positions 8 to 15 on the ranking of the qualified teams were allocated to Pot 2, while the 16th to 23rd best-ranked qualifiers were placed in Pot 3. Finally, Pot 4 included the qualified teams in positions 24 to 28, plus three placeholders representing the two winners of the intercontinental play-offs and the remaining UEFA play-off winners. The hosts continued to be placed in Pot 1 and treated as a seeded team, and therefore Pot 1 consisted of hosts Qatar and the seven highest-ranked teams that qualified for the tournament. The final three teams to qualify were determined in these playoffs played during the June 2022 international match window.

The draw sequence started with Pot 1 and ended with Pot 4.

== Personnel involved ==
The 32 nations involved in the 2022 World Cup (29 of which were known) were drawn into eight groups of four. Two of the remaining three spots were filled by the winners of the intercontinental play-offs on 13 or 14 June, with the third berth determined by Path A of the European qualifying play-offs, which was delayed due to the Russian invasion of Ukraine.

The draw was attended by 2,000 guests and was led by Carli Lloyd, Jermaine Jenas, and Samantha Johnson, assisted by the likes of Cafu (Brazil), Lothar Matthäus (Germany), Adel Ahmed Malalla (Qatar), Ali Daei (Iran), Bora Milutinović (Serbia/USA/Mexico), Jay-Jay Okocha (Nigeria), Rabah Madjer (Algeria), and Tim Cahill (Australia).

== Seeding ==
Teams were seeded using the March 2022 FIFA World Rankings (shown in parentheses), which were published on 31 March 2022.

The highest-ranked team not to qualify for the World Cup, and also the only team from the top 16 in the rankings not to qualify, was sixth-ranked Italy.

Pots
Pot 1	Pot 2	Pot 3	Pot 4
Qatar (51) (H); Brazil (1); Belgium (2); France (3); Argentina (4); England (5); Spain (7); Portugal (8)	Mexico (9); Netherlands (10); Denmark (11); Germany (12); Uruguay (13); Switzerland (14); United States (15); Croatia (16)	Senegal (20); Iran (21); Japan (23); Morocco (24); Serbia (25); Poland (26); South Korea (29); Tunisia (35)	Cameroon (37); Canada (38); Ecuador (46); Saudi Arabia (49); Ghana (60); UEFA Path A winners (Note: Team not determined at time of draw, as those matches were held in June 2022.); CONCACAF–OFC play-off winners AFC–CONMEBOL play-off winners

Notes

- H : Hosts

== Final draw ==
The eight groups were formed randomly, selecting one team from each of the four pots. Two teams from the same confederation could not be placed into the same group, with the exception of UEFA teams, where up to two teams could be in the same group. The only team whose position in the draw was predetermined was the host Qatar, who were placed into position A1.

Group A
Pos	Team
A1	Qatar
A2	Ecuador
A3	Senegal
A4	Netherlands

Group E
Pos	Team
E1	Spain
E2	Costa Rica (Note: CONCACAF–OFC play-off winners)
E3	Germany
E4	Japan

Group B
Pos	Team
B1	England
B2	Iran
B3	United States
B4	Wales (Note: UEFA Path A winners)

Group F
Pos	Team
F1	Belgium
F2	Canada
F3	Morocco
F4	Croatia

Group C
Pos	Team
C1	Argentina
C2	Saudi Arabia
C3	Mexico
C4	Poland

Group G
Pos	Team
G1	Brazil
G2	Serbia
G3	Switzerland
G4	Cameroon

Group D
Pos	Team
D1	France
D2	Australia (Note: AFC–CONMEBOL play-off winners)
D3	Denmark
D4	Tunisia

Group H
Pos	Team
H1	Portugal
H2	Ghana
H3	Uruguay
H4	South Korea

== See also ==
- 2018 FIFA World Cup seeding
- 2026 FIFA World Cup seeding
