= Carlos Martínez (footballer, born 1999) =

Costa Rican footballer

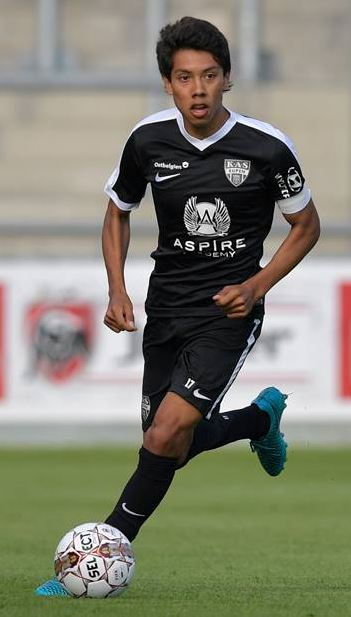

Personal information
- Full name: Carlos Manuel Martínez Castro
- Date of birth: 30 March 1999 (age 27)
- Place of birth: Santa Ana, Costa Rica
- Height: 1.76 m (5 ft 9 in)
- Position: Right-back

Team information
- Current team: Partizani
- Number: 2

Youth career
- 2015–2017: Aspire Academy

Senior career*
Years	Team	Apps	(Gls)
2017–2018	Eupen	0	(0)
2019	Herediano	1	(0)
2019–2020	Guadalupe	31	(0)
2020–2023	San Carlos	54	(2)
2023–2025	Alajuelense	91	(2)
2025–	Partizani	10	(1)

International career^{‡}
2018	Costa Rica U20	5	(0)
2022–	Costa Rica	11	(0)
- * Club domestic league appearances and goals as of 13 May 2026 ‡ National team caps and goals as of 5 September 2023

Carlos Manuel Martínez Castro (born 30 March 1999) is a Costa Rican footballer who plays as a right-back for Partizani and the Costa Rica national team.

== Career ==
In 2015, Martínez joined the Aspire Academy in Senegal, becoming the second Costa Rican to join the academy.

In 2017, he signed for Belgian side Eupen.

In 2019, Martínez signed for Guadalupe in Costa Rica, where he made 31 league appearances and scored 0 goals.
